= Aankh Salamat Andhay Log =

Pakistani drama television series

- Written by: Malik Khuda Baksh
- Directed by: Shafqat Moin Ud Din
- Starring: Saba Qamar; Nauman Ijaz; Maira Khan
- Theme music composer: Asim Raza
- Opening theme: Fariha Pervez; Rahat Fateh Ali Khan
- Country of origin: Pakistan
- Original language: Urdu
- No. of episodes: 22

Production
- Producer: Chaudhary Muhammad Ismail

Original release
- Network: A-Plus TV
- Release: 2010 – 2011

Aankh Salamat Andhe Log is a Pakistani drama television series first broadcast on A-Plus TV and ATV in 2010. It features Saba Qamar, Nauman Ijaz, Maira Khan, and Babrik Shah in the lead roles. The title track "Koi Diya" was composed by Asim Raza and sung by Rahat Fateh Ali Khan and Fariha Pervez.

== Cast ==
- Saba Qamar as Amara
- Nabeel as Zeeshan
- Azra Aftab as Nusrat
- Babrak Shah as Junaid
- Moammar Rana as Zahid Jamal
- Ghazala Butt
- Inam Khan
- Maira Khan as Sadia
- Qavi Khan
- Naghma Begam
- Naheed Shabbir as Chandni
- Mehmood Aslam
- Saba Faisal
- Nauman Ejaz as Gulfam
- Rashid Mahmood
- Sohail Sameer as Sikandar

== Awards and nominations ==
| Year | Recipient | Award | Category | Result | Ref. |
|---|---|---|---|---|---|
| 2012 | Maira Khan | 11th Lux Style Awards | Best TV Actress- Terrestrial | Nominated | |
| 2012 | Moammar Rana | 11th Lux Style Awards | Best TV Actor (Terrestrial) | Nominated | |
| 2012 | Mehmood Aslam | 11th Lux Style Awards | Best TV Actor (Terrestrial) | Nominated | |
