= Roger (TV series) =

- Genre: Crime
- Starring: Arbaaz Khan; Ali Tabish; Shamil Khan; Azra Aftab; Ghazala Butt
- Country of origin: Pakistan

Production
- Running time: 45–50 minutes (per episode)
- Production company: PTV

Original release
- Network: PTV Home
- Release: 28 September 2010

Roger is a Pakistani drama that was aired on PTV. It featured three actors from Pakistani cinema: Arbaaz Khan, Ali Tabish and Shamil Khan. It was made with the support of the Pakistani Police.

== Plot ==
The drama is about the Pakistani Police and how it tackles crime and the underworld.

== Cast and crew ==
- Noman Ijaz-Jamal Shahab
- Khayam Sarhadi
- Arbaaz Khan
- Shamil Khan
- Fiza Ali-Faiza
- Rija
- Azra Aftab
- Abid Ali
- Abdullah Ejaz-ACP
- Ali Tabish
- Fareeha Jabeen
- Shazia Afgan
- Ashraf Khan
- Jameel Fakhri
- Khalid Butt
- Rasheed Aliroger
- Ruby Anum
- Ghazala Butt
- Raima Khan
- Director-Ayeza Irfan
- Writer- Tariq Ismaeel Sagar and Shahid Nazir
- Music- Sahir Ali Bagga
- Lyrics- Asam Raza and Dr Syed Azhar Hassan Nadeem
- Set-Azam Malik and Irum Rehman
- Audio-Shafaat Cheema and Ibrar Ahmad
- DOP- Nadim Akber Dar
