= 9th Lux Style Awards =

Pakistani film awards ceremony

- Screenshot from the ceremony program
- Date: 28 February 2010
- Site: Expo Centre, Lahore
- Directed by: Sohail Javed
- Organized by: Unilever Pakistan

Highlights
- Best Actor: Noman Ijaz (TV - Terrestrial); Humayun Saeed (TV - Satellite)

Television coverage
- Channel: ARY Digital

Stage set for Lux Style Awards 2010.

The 9th Lux Style Awards ceremony was held in 2010 at the Expo Centre, Lahore, Pakistan. It honored the best film, television, music, and fashion achievements in the Pakistani entertainment industry. After the previous year's ceremony was cancelled in favour of a photo op with the award winners due to the prevailing security outlook in the country, the ceremony returned for the 9th edition of the awards.

Comedian Sami Shah hosted the ceremony.

== Awards and nominations ==
Winners are listed first, in boldface.

=== Film ===
Categories	Winners
Best Film	**Nach Ke Yaar Manana–Syed Noor**
Best Film Actor	**Shaan–Nach Ke Yaar Manana**
Best Film Actress	**Saima Noor–Nach Ke Yaar Manana**

=== Television ===
Categories	Winners	Nominations
Best Television Play (Terrestrial)	Khuda Zameen Se Gaya Nahin-PTV	Jinnah Ke Naam-PTV; Rani-PTV; Kaghaz Ki Nao-ATV; Jee Chahta Hai-ATV
Best Television Actor (Terrestrial)	Noman Ijaz–Kaghaz Ki Nao (ATV)	Ayub Khoso–Khuda Zameen Se Gaya Nahin (PTV); Sajid Hasan–Rani (PTV); Shahood Alvi–Jee Chahta Hai (ATV); Ahsan Khan–Muhabbat Yun Bhi Hoti Hai (ATV)
Best Television Actress (Terrestrial)	Maira Khan–Jee Chahta Hai (ATV)	Angeline Malik – Rani (PTV); Juggan Kazim–Kaghaz Ki Nao (ATV); Saba Qamar – Jinnah Ke Naam (PTV); Sara Chaudhry–Khuda Zameen Se Gaya Nahin (PTV)
Best Television Play (Satellite)	Ishq Junoon Deewangi-Hum TV	Doraha-Geo TV; Teri Ik Nazar-Geo TV; Aashti-Hum TV; Ishq Ki Inteha-Geo TV
Best Television Actor (Satellite)	Humayun Saeed–Ishq Junoon Deewangi (Hum TV)	Humayun Saeed–Doraha (Geo TV); Fahad Mustafa–Veena (ARY Digital); Mohib Mirza–Dil-e-Nadan (Geo TV); Shabbir Jan–Andata (Indus Vision)
Best Television Actress (Satellite)	Sania Saeed–The Ghost (Hum TV)	Resham–Aashti (Hum TV); Sonia Rehman–Doraha (Geo TV); Sara Chaudhry–Teri Ik Nazar (Geo TV); Sanam Baloch–Noorpur Ki Rani (Hum TV)
Best Television Director	Mehreen Jabbar–Doraha (Geo TV)	Kashif Nisar–Khuda Zameen Se Gaya Nahin (PTV); Babar Javed–Ishq Junoon Deewangi (Hum TV); Adnan Wai Qureshi–Aashti (Hum TV); Tariq Mairaj–Jinnah Ke Naam (PTV)
Best Television Writer	Asghar Nadeem Syed–Khuda Zameen Se Gaya Nahin (PTV)	Kashif Nisar–Jinnah Ke Naam (PTV); Zafar Mairaj–Darwaza (PTV); Seema Ghazal–Aashti (Hum TV); Fizza Jaffri-Veena (ARY Digital)

=== Music ===
Categories	Winners	Nominations
Best Artist of the Year	**Mauj**	Rahim Shah; Shiraz Uppal; Overload; Mariam Kizilbash
Best Singer of the Year	**Meekal Hasan Band**	Imran Khan; Shiraz Uppal; Rahim Shah; Zain ul Abedin
Best Music Producer	**Rohail Hyatt–Coke Studio (season 2)**	Shiraz Uppal-Ankahi; Shani & Kami-Rahim Shah; Mekaal Hasan Band-Saptak; Farhad Humayun-Pichal Pairee
Best Video Director	**Zeeshan Parwez**	Sohail Javed; Farhad Humayun; Bilal Lashari; Ahsan Rahim

=== Fashion ===
Category	Winner	Nominations
Best Model of the Year (male)	Iftikhar Zafar	Abdullah Ejaz; Arsalan; Rohail Peerzada
Best Model of the Year (female)	Fayeza Ansari	Cybil Chowdhry; Aamina Sheikh; Mehreen Syed; Rabia Butt
Best Emerging Talent in Fashion	Feeha Jamshed	Raana Khan; Ayaan Ali; M.Mubarak; Ayaz Anis
Best Fashion Photographer/Videographer	Guddu Shani	Fayyaz Ahmed; Khawar Riaz; Maram Azmat & Abroo Hashmi; Rizwan-ul-Haq
Best Fashion Makeup & Hair Artist	Rizwana Khan	Khawar Riaz; Nighat Misbah; Saba Ansari
Best Achievement in Fashion Design (Prét)	Deepak Perwani	Kamiar Rokni; Khaadi; Sara Shahid at Sublime; Sonya Battla
Best Achievement in Fashion Design (Luxury Prét)	Sana Safinaz	Iman Ahmed at Body Focus; Nomi Ansari; Shamaeel Ansari; Rizwan Baig
Best Achievement in Fashion Design (Menswear)	Hassan Sheheryar Yasin	Amir Adnan; Ismail Farid; Kuki Concepts; Fahad Hussain
Best Retail Brand	Generation	Khaadi; Fnk Asia; CrossRoads; Stoneage

=== Special ===
==== Chairperson's Lifetime Achievement Award ====
Roohi Bano
