= Farz =

Farz (Persian: فرض ) is a Persian word of Arabic origin, also used in Urdu and Hindi, meaning "duty" or "obligation". It may refer to:

== Film ==
- Farz (1947 film), a 1947 Hindi film
- Farz (1967 film), an Indian Hindi-language film directed by Ravikant Nagaich
- Farz (1973 film), a Pakistani Urdu-language film directed by Laeeq Akhtar
- Farz (2001 film), an Indian Hindi-language film directed by Raj Kanwar

== Other uses ==
- Farz (TV series), a 2017 Pakistani drama series
- Fard, a religious duty in Islam, mandatory by God
