= Suzain Fatima =

Pakistani actress

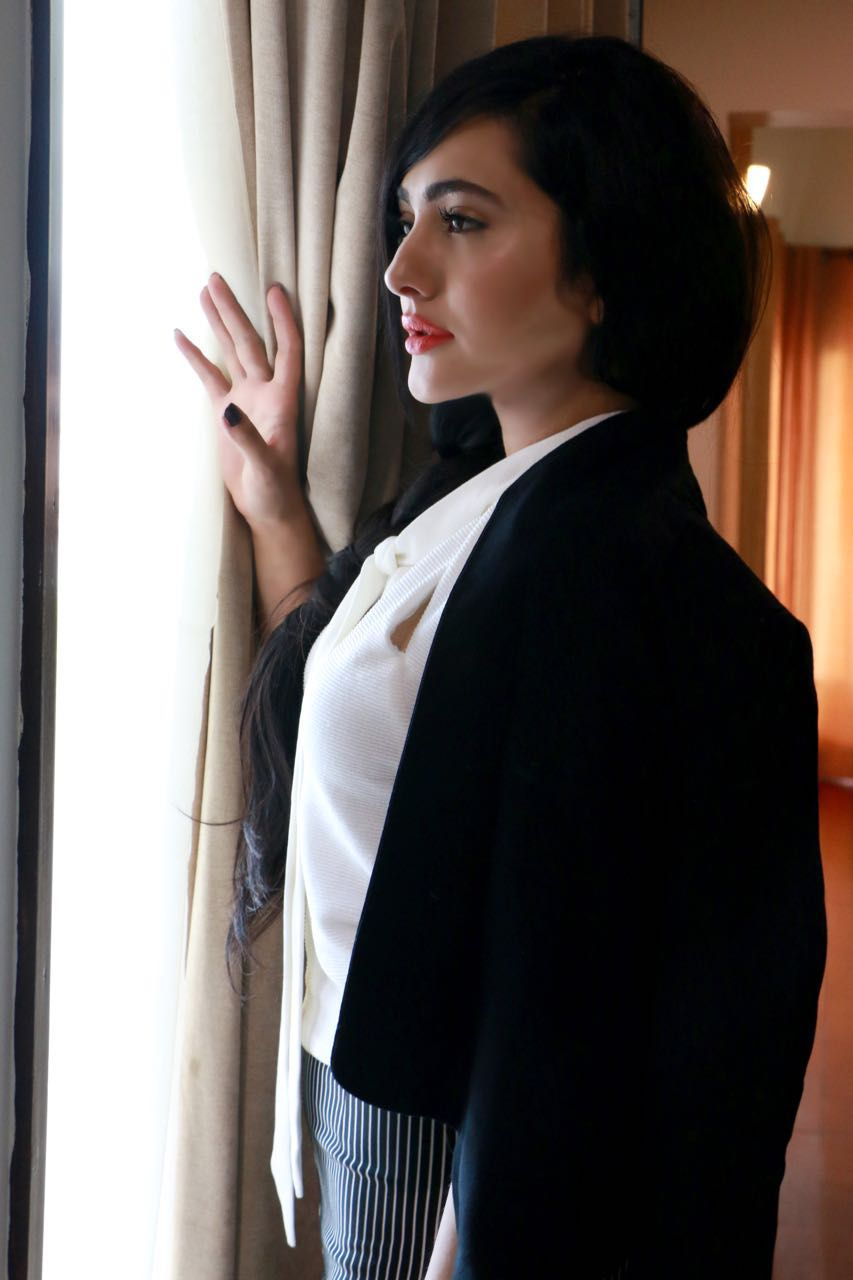
- Born: 16 November 1986 (age 39); Karachi, Pakistan
- Occupations: Model, actress
- Years active: 2004–present

Suzain Fatima (born 16 November 1986) is a Pakistani actress. She has acted in many television series in Pakistan and also played a leading role in the Indian television series Parwaaz. She is known for her role as Fatima in Meri Maa and Mehru in Behnein Aisi Bhi Hoti Hain. She would make her cinematic debut with the film Delhi Gate, scheduled for release on Eid ul Fitr, in March 2026.

== Career ==
=== Modeling ===
She has been modeling for many years, having done from bridal to causal still shoots. Suzain has done many commercials as well in Pakistan, such as for Olpers, Dawlance, Mobilink Jazz, Askari Bank, and Knorr.

=== Acting ===
She started her professional career in 2004 and her first play was Mohabbet Hai Zindagi which was on aired on PTV Home. She has also worked in Indian television series Parwaaz which was on aired on Zee TV. She gained popularity with her portrayal of a leading role in ARY Zindagi's Behnein Aisi Bhi Hoti Hain.

=== Hosting ===
In 2015, she hosted season 2 of Haan Qabool Hai on ATV.

== Filmography ==
=== Films ===
Key
†	Denotes films that have not yet been released

Year	Title	Role	Notes	Ref.
2025	Delhi Gate †	TBA	Debut film, post-production	

=== Television ===
Year	Serial	Channel
2004	Mohabbet Hai Zindagi	PTV Home
2004	Chandini	Aaj News
2006	Humsafar	Indus TV
2008	Paanch Saaliyan	Geo Entertainment
2011	Desi Kuriyan – Season 3	ARY Digital
2011	Dil Tamanna aur Tum	ATV
2012	Meri Maa	Geo Entertainment
2012	Jahez	Geo Entertainment
2013	Bannjh	Geo Entertainment
2014	Parwaaz	Zee TV
2014	Behnein Aisi Bhi Hoti Hain	ARY Zindagi
2015	Bari Bahu	Geo Entertainment
2017	Ghareeb Zaadi	A-Plus Entertainment
