= Fareeha Jabeen =

Pakistani actress

- فریحہ جبین
- Born: 10 February 1957 (age 69); Lahore, Punjab, Pakistan
- Occupation: Actress
- Years active: 1990s–present
- Relatives: Amar Khan (daughter)

Fareeha Jabeen (Punjabi, Urdu: فریحہ جبین, also spelled as Fariha Jabeen is a Pakistani actress. She used to appear in PTV Home's classic serials in the 1990s. She has also appeared in a few Urdu films. She played the role of Nagina (Chachi) in Hum TV's acclaimed cult popular TV series Suno Chanda 2. She also played the role of Kareeman (Bua) in Hum TV's show O Rangreza.

== Personal life ==
Jabeen is from Taxali Gate, Lahore and currently resides in Karachi. She is of Punjabi background. Actress Amar Khan is her daughter.

== Filmography ==
=== Television ===
Year	Title	Role	Network	Notes
1984	Andhera Ujala	Asghari	PTV Home	Episode: Shana Bashana
1989	Neelay Hath	Police Woman	PTV Home	
1990	Raigzar		PTV Home	
1991	Khirman	Kaneez	PTV Home	Anthology: Tele Theater
1992	Dastak	Riffat	PTV Home	Long Play
1995	Raiza Raiza	Manzooran	PTV Home	
1995	Sanata		PTV Home	Anthology: Qasimi Kahani
1996	Nawan Din Charhiya	Naseebaan	PTV Home	Anthology: Raas
1996	Kaki Da Sawar	Haneefaan	PTV Home	Anthology: Sham Saver
1997	Faisala	Razia	PTV Home	Anthology: Ajj Di Kahani
1997	Oukhian Rahwan		PTV Home	Anthology: Ajj Di Kahani
1998	House Full	Begum Nanhay Mian	PTV Home	Comedy Theater
1999	Aahlna	Bhagaan	PTV Home	Punjabi drama
2000	Us Paar		PTV Home	
2000	Dopatta		PTV Home	
2001	Naya Admai	Zainab	PTV Home	Long Play
2003	Karwat		PTV Home	
2003	Vaihlay Masroof		PTV Home	Anthology: Jag Beeti
2004	Aag	Sabir's mother	PTV Home	
2005	Aandhi		PTV Home	
2006	Malangi	Phuphi Qudoos	PTV Home	
2006	Khawab Nagar		PTV Home	
2006–2007	Double Sawari	Siraj's wife	PTV Home	
2007	Sarkar Sahab	Surayya	ARY TV	
2007	Maye Ni Mein Kehnu Aakhan		Apna Channel	Punjabi drama
2008	Uss Paar	Bakhtay	ATV	
2008	Khawahishon Kay Jugnoo		PTV Home	
2010	Roger		PTV Home	
2011	Ek Hatheli Pe Hina Ek Hatheli Pe Lahoo	Rubina	Geo TV	
2011–2013	Anokha Ladla	Baalaan	PTV Home	
2013	Dil Awaiz		PTV Home	
2013–2014	Mann Ke Moti	Maham's mother-in-law	Geo TV	
2014	Do Qadam Door Thay		Geo TV	
2015	Ishq Ibadat		Hum TV	
2016	Meri Saheli Meri Bhabhi		Geo TV	
2017	O Rangreza	Kareeman Bua	Hum TV	
2017–2018	Mera Haq		Geo TV	
2018–2019	Chatpata Chowk		Bol Entertainment	
2019	Suno Chanda 2	Nagina	Hum TV	
2019	Tootay Patay		PTV Home	
2019	Dolly Darling	Inspector Dareena	Geo TV	
2019	Resham Gali Ki Husna		Hum TV	
2021	Khuda Aur Muhabbat (season 3)	Fakira	Geo TV	
2021	Mohabbat Chor Di Maine	Fouzia	Geo TV	
2021–22	Koyal	Falak	Aaj Entertainment	
2022	Inaam e Mohabbat	Mumtaz	Geo Entertainment	
2022–23	Pinjra	Feroza Bi	ARY Digital	
2022–23	Meray Damad		Hum TV	
2022–23	Aik Thi Laila		Express Entertainment	
2023	Baby Baji	Rakshi's mother	ARY Digital	
2023	Hadsa	Humaira Bano	Geo Entertainment	

=== Film ===
- Khamosh Pani (2003)
- Jhoomar (2007)
- Gulabo (2008)
- 7 Din Mohabbat In (2018)
- Wrong No. 2 (2019)
- Wedding Virus (telefilm) (2022)
