= Maira Khan =

Pakistani model, host and actress (born 1980)

- مائرہ خان
- Born: 27 July 1984 (age 42); Karachi, Sindh, Pakistan
- Education: BAMM PECHS
- Occupations: Actress; Model; Host
- Years active: 2002-present
- Notable work: Chambaili (2013 film)
- Height: 1.65 m (5 ft 5 in)
- Parent: Shakeela Anayat (mother)

Maira Khan (Urdu: مائرہ خان; born 27 July 1984) is a Pakistani television and film actress, model and former VJ.

Her notable acting credits include Chambaili (2013 film), Revenge of the Worthless (2016 film), Durj (2019 film), Cheekh (2019 TV Drama), Bewafa (2019). She was a contestant of the reality show Tamasha which aired on ARY Digital & ARY ZAP app, she was evicted towards the end of the show for trying to bite another contestant's finger.

== Early life ==
Maira Khan was born in Karachi, Pakistan on 27 July 1984 to actress Shakeela Anayat. She has one step brother and sister. Khan graduated from BAMM PECHS Karachi. She started her career as a child actor when she was only four years old.

== Career ==
Maira Khan first appeared in the hit TV serial Jaise Jante Nahin. Since then she has appeared on PTV, Indus TV, Hum TV, ARY TV, TV One, Geo TV serials. She has also appeared as a VJ on Play TV, and hosts her own talk show. She made her film debut in the 2013 political film Chambaili by Shehzad Nawaz and Ismail Jilani. Her character stands up for what's right and is the epitome of the strength of a woman.

== Filmography ==
=== Films ===
Key
†	Denotes films that have not been released yet

Year	Film	Role	Notes
2013	Chambaili	Kiran	Debut film
2016	Revenge of the Worthless	Shabana	
2019	Durj	Farah	
2023	Daadal	Bilqees	
2026	Aag Lagay Basti Mein	Neelofar	

=== Telefilm ===
Year	Title	Role	Network
2006	Kyun Pyar Nahi Milta	Naveen	Geo Entertainment
2006	Bhaid Bhao	Tehseen Zehra	TV One Pakistan
2006	Couzin Sarah	Sarah	ARY Digital
2006	Chaal	Maria	Indus Vision
2006	Kaali Raat	Maria	Indus Vision
2006	Rani Ka Raja	Rani	Indus Vision
2006	Bus Stop	Arifa	TV One Pakistan
2008	Billo Ki Eid Hogai	Billo	ARY Digital
2009	Tu Jo Nahin	Safoora	TV One
2009	Kaanch Ki Dunya	Seema	PTV Home
2010	Choo Lo Zindagi Ko	Aapi	PTV Home
2011	Meri Pyari Behniya Bane Gi Dulhaniya	Hina	ARY Digital
2011	Bonga BA	Kousar	TV One Pakistan
2012	Tere Ishq Nachaya	Erum	Express Entertainment
2013	Miyan Biwi Aur Woh		Hum TV
2015	Uff Tera Jalwa	Saira	Hum TV
2015	Khamoshi	Neelam	TV One Pakistan
2016	Super Saas	Naila	TV One Pakistan
2019	Aik Se Barh Kar Aik	Shahida	ARY Digital
2021	Bhoot Bangla	Noor	LTN Family

=== Short film ===
Year	Title	Role	Network	Note
2016	Chotay Shah	Asiya	Zee5	Short film
2021	False Truth	Nisha	DEW Original	Short film

=== Television ===
Year	Title	Role	Network
2004	Jaise Jante Nahi	Maham	ARY Digital
2005	Tum Kahan Hum Kahan		ARY Digital
2005	Riyasat	Shani	ARY Digital
2005	Sun Leyna	Rani	ARY Digital
2006	Makan	Naheed	Geo Entertainment
2006	Kinara		ARY Digital
2007	Cousins	Koleen	PTV Home
2007	Yaadain	Piya	PTV Home
2008	Kisey Awaz Doun	Jojo	PTV Home
2008	Mann Se Poocho	Mozna	TV One Pakistan
2009	Kaisi Hain Dooriyan		ARY Digital
2009	Mehman	Shireen	ARY Digital
2009	Nindya Kyun Jalti Jaey	Sabeen	TV One Pakistan
2009	Dil Mera Mera Nahin	Sawera	ATV
2009	Beena	Minahil	ATV
2009	Naina		Indus Vision
2009	Jinnah Ke Naam	Laila	PTV Home
2010	Samdhan	Afia	Hum TV
2010	Jee Chahta Hai	Sadia	ATV
2010	Aankh Salamat Andhay Log	Sadia	ATV
2012	Ajnabi Shehar Kay Ajnabi Raastay	Zainab	TV One Pakistan
2012	Ishq Samandar	Sawera	TV One Pakistan
2012	Bay Iman	Faria	PTV Home
2012	Chaar Mausam	Ayesha	PTV Home
2012	Janam Jali	Rani	PTV Home
2012	Kaash	Bela	PTV Home
2013	Jiya Na Jaye	Shehla	Hum TV
2013	Tamannah "Manzil Na Janay Kahan"	Suzaina	TV One Pakistan
2013	Jaan Hatheli Par	Jebi	Urdu 1
2013	Ghayal	Shamma	A-Plus TV
2014	Mohabbat Zindabad	Shireen	Express Entertainment
2014	Jhooti	Nida	Express Entertainment
2014	Riwaaj	Maliha	Urdu 1
2014	Khanabadosh	Gulmayi	TV One Pakistan
2015	Kokh	Mifrah	Express Entertainment
2015	Bari Bahu	Mona	Geo Entertainment
2017	Dhund	Saima (Ep 9)	TV One Pakistan
2018	Babban Khala Ki Betiyann	Aini	ARY Digital
2018-2019	Aap Ko Kya Takleef Hai	Rabiya	Bol Network
2018-2019	Mirchiyan	Narmeen	Bol Network
2018-2019	Jin Ki Ayegi Baraat	Amna (Ep 1)	Bol Network
2019	Qadam Qadam Ishq	Naila	A-Plus TV
2019	Cheekh	Shehwar Taseer	ARY Digital
2019	Bulbulay (season 2)	Sweety	ARY Digital
2019	Bewafa	Sharmeen	ARY Digital
2019	Nawabzadiyan	Shaherbano	Express Entertainment
2019-2020	Jadugaryan	Saba	Hum TV
2020	Jalan	Humaira	ARY Digital
2021	Mujhay Vida Kar	Kashifa	ARY Digital
2021	Mein Hari Piya	Maria	ARY Digital
2021	Zid	Falak	Aaj Entertainment
2021	Biwi Se Biwi Tak	Maira (Ep 93)	Aaj Entertainment
2023	Ehraam-e-Junoon	Nadia	Geo Entertainment
2023	Qabeel	Tamseela	aur Life HD
2023	Apney Hee Tou Hain	Faiza	Green Entertainment
2024	Happy Go Lucky	Malika	Set Entertainment

=== Anthology Series ===
Year	Title	Role	Network	Notes
2004	Mera Naam Hai Mohabbat	Alizeh	Indus Vision	Episode 3 "U Turn"
2005	Aaj Ki Kahaniyan	Jogiyaa	Aaj Entertainment	Episode 12 "Jogiyaa"
2012
2012	Doosra Sach	Ghazala	TV One Pakistan	Episode "Ke Ghairat Jiska Naam Tha"
2012	Sasural Ke Rang Anokhay	Saba	Hum TV	Episode "Makei Ki Laaj Rakhna"
2012	Kitni Girhain Baaki Hain	Sawera	Hum TV	Episode "Koyla Bani Na Raakh"
2012	Kitni Girhain Baaki Hain	Nadia	Hum TV	Episode "Faslay"
2012	Shaadi Ka Laddu	Aliya	Express Entertainment	Episode "Daadi Ka Laddu"
2014	Shaadi Ka Laddu	Asma	Express Entertainment	Episode "Iss Mein Shamsa Ka Kya Kusoor"
2019	Makafaat	Jamila	Geo Entertainment	Episode "Naik Seerat"
2019	Makafaat	Shabo	Geo Entertainment	Episode "Inaam"
2022	Mamlaat	Sofia	Geo Entertainment	Episode "Israaf"
2022	Mamlaat	Afsheen	Geo Entertainment	Episode "Badgumani Gunah Hai"
2022	Mamlaat	Maria	Geo Entertainment	Episode "Naiki Ka Sila"
2022	Makafaat	Rania	Geo Entertainment	Episode "Mein"

=== Reality Show ===
Year	Title	Role	Notes
2022	Tamasha	Contestant	5th place

=== Web series ===
Year	Title	Role	Network	Notes
2022	Yeah Ramzan	Mother	WonderTeam	3 Episodes

=== Hosting ===
Year	Title	Role	Network	Notes
2004	Eye Vision	Host/Vj	Indus Vision	
2020	Marhaba Ramazan	Host with Syed Saim Ali	Channel 5 (Pakistani TV channel)	Ramazan transmission

=== Music video ===
Year	Title	Singer(s)
2023	Shayad	Ehtisham Khan

== Awards and nominations ==
Maira Khan awards and nominations
Awards and nominations
Award	Wins	Nominations
Lux Style Awards	1	2
Others	0	4

Totals (Note: Certain award groups do not simply award one winner. They acknowledge several different recipients, have runners-up, and have third place. Since this is a specific recognition and is different from losing an award, runner-up mentions are considered wins in this award tally. For simplification and to avoid errors, each award in this list has been presumed to have had a prior nomination.)
- Wins: 1
- Nominations: 6

Year	Content	Award	Category	Result	Ref.
2010	Jee Chahta Hai	9th Lux Style Awards	Best TV Actress-Terrestrial	Won	
2012	Aankh Salamat Andhay Log	11th Lux Style Awards	Best TV Actress- Terrestrial	Nominated	
2014	Chambaili	ARY Film Awards	Best Star Debut Female	Nominated	
2014	Tamanna	4th Pakistan Media Awards	Best Drama Actress	Nominated	
2017	Revenge of the Worthless	Nigar Award	Best Actress	Nominated	
