= Nauman Ijaz =

Pakistani actor

PP Nauman Ijaz
- نُعمان اعجاز
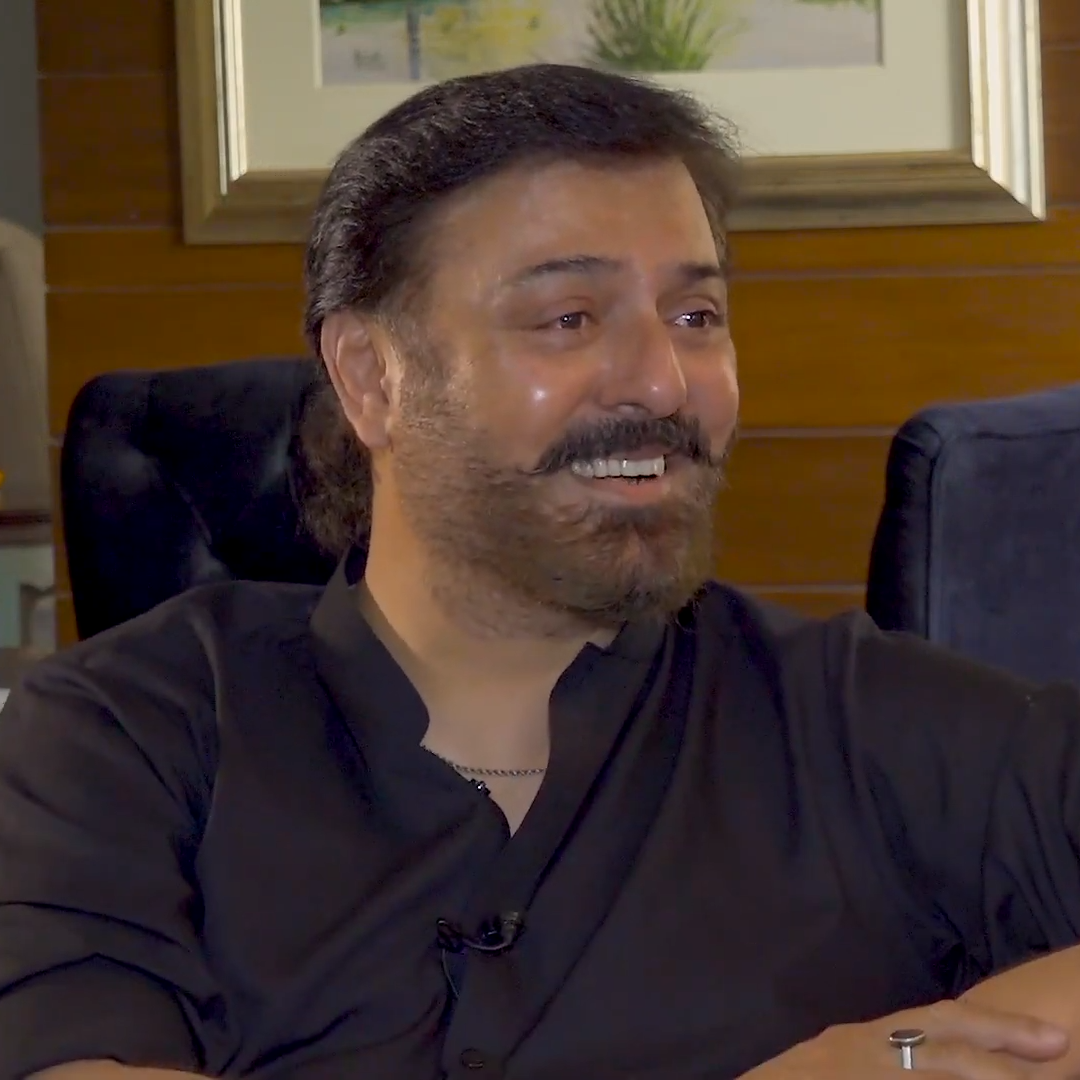
- Ijaz in 2022
- Born: 14 February 1965 (age 61); Lahore, Punjab, Pakistan
- Education: Punjab University, Lahore
- Occupations: Actor; Host
- Years active: 1989–present
- Spouse: Rabia Noman
- Children: 3, including Zaviyar Nauman
- Awards: Pride of Performance (2012); PTV Award; 7 Hum Awards; 10 Lux Style Awards

Nauman Ijaz (Punjabi and Urdu: نُعمان اعجاز; born 14 February 1965) is a Pakistani actor. Active since 1989, he has played many roles and has been a senior actor on state television PTV. As of 2014, he had acted in some 175 television series.

He is the recipient of several accolades, including 10 Lux Style Awards, 7 Hum Awards and a President's Pride of Performance award, which was presented to him in 2012 from the President of Pakistan, Asif Ali Zardari.

Occasionally, he has also served as a television host, while before becoming an actor he was a lawyer.

== Early life and education ==
Ijaz was born on 14 February 1965 and grew up in Icchra town, Lahore into a Punjabi family. His father was the manager of a cinema house in Lahore and Ijaz has an elder brother and a younger sister.

Ijaz began his education at Cathedral High School in Lahore. Later, he attended the Divisional Public School, Model Town, Lahore and then completed his further education at Forman Christian College. His parents wanted him to become a doctor, while he aspired to be a newscaster. However, inspired by his elder brother, he ultimately pursued a law degree from Punjab University.

== Acting career ==
=== Television ===
Ijaz began his acting career on PTV in 1989, after being rejected in 1985 and then in 1987, with a short appearance under the direction of Nusrat Thakur in the drama Aik Din. His role lasted only 50 seconds. He then did a TV serial on PTV (Quetta Center).

He later appeared in many different roles, including negative roles in the dramas Rehaai (2013) and Ullu Baraye Farokht Nahi (2013).

In 2014, he played a Pakistani cab-driver based in Jackson Heights in Mehreen Jabbar's directed Jackson Heights. He received unanimous praise for his performance, with a reviewer from Dawn stating, "He was truly the linchpin, holding the interest level in Jackson Heights even when the pace was flagging." From 2016-17, he appeared in titular role in Bhai as Aslam alias Bhai, the troublemaker local councillor from the Walled City of Lahore. In 2017, he played the titular role of ruthless and influential politician in political-drama Khan. The same year, he played a household molestor in Kashif Nisar's directed Dar Si Jaati Hai Sila, for which he received Best TV Actor - Critics' Choice at the 18th Lux Style Awards.

Some of his other notable serials include Noorpur Ki Rani (2009), Mera Saaein (2010), Durr-e-Shehwar (2011), Badi Aapa (2012), Sang-e-Mar Mar (2016), O Rangreza (2017), Raqeeb Se (2021), Parizaad (2021), and Sang-e-Mah (2022).

=== Cinema ===
He has appeared in the film Ramchand Pakistani (2008) where he romanced Nandita Das.

=== Webseries ===
Ijaz starred alongside Saba Qamar in the 2022 Zindagi original webseries Mrs. & Mr. Shameem, which received attention for its unconventional romantic storyline and premiered on ZEE5 on 11 March 2022.

== Other work ==
=== Legal career ===
Before becoming an actor, Ijaz initially began his professional journey as a lawyer, undertaking cases before family and civil courts in Lahore for several years before fully committing to the entertainment industry.

=== Hosting career ===
In the early 2010s, he hosted a TV comedy show called Mazaaq Raat on Dunya News. Earlier, he had hosted a comedy show on PTV Home. Later, he also hosted a prime time talk show on Neo News HD titled G Sarkar.

== Personal life ==
Ijaz tied the knot with Rabia in the 1990s. In an interview, he shared that he first met Rabia at a college function. Initially, she acted reserved and asked him to keep his distance, but he persisted. During a charity event for Shaukat Khanum Hospital, he proposed to her, asking if she would marry him. Rabia asked him to talk to her parents, and he decided to do so. The couple has three sons, including actor Zaviyar Nauman Ijaz.

== Filmography ==
Key
†	denotes film / drama that has not released yet
†	Denotes films / drama that are currently on cinema / on air

=== Films ===
Year	Film	Language	Ref.
1990	Jangloos	Punjabi	
1991	Betaab	Punjabi	
1991	Rangeelay Chor	Punjabi	
2008	Ramchand Pakistani	Urdu	
2008	Small Voices	Urdu	
2010	Virsa	Punjabi	
2010	Hijrat	Punjabi	
2016	Hijrat	Urdu	

=== Television serials ===
Year	Title	Role	Network	Notes	Ref.
1990	Fishaar	Ahmad Jamal Khan	PTV		
1991	Patt Jhar	Majid	PTV		
1992	Rustum Aur Suhrab	Akhtar	PTV		
1992	Sofia	Murad	PTV		
1993	Dasht	Mir Balaaj	NTM		
1993	Nijaat	Huzoor Bakhsh	PTV		
1993	Talaash	Saleem	PTV		
1994	Eendhan	Arslan	PTV		
1995	Uraan	Adnan	PTV		
1995	Yeh Zindagi	Sheraz	PTV		
1995	To To	Atta Yazdani	PTV		
1996	Ranjish	Zahid	PTV		
1996	Ilzam	Nasir Ali	PTV		
1997	Yeh Zindagi	Sheraz	PTV		
1997	Shanakht	Tanveer	PTV		
1999	Pehli Chori	Ali	PTV		
1999	Larki Ik Sharmili Si	Taufeeq	PTV		
2000	Aansoo	Sami Khan	PTV		
2000	Ab Yeh Mumkin Nahi	Sajjad	PTV		
2000	Dunya	Akhtar Ali	PTV		
2001	Wafa Ke Mausam		PTV		
2001	Pehli Barish	Salman	PTV		
2002	Nigah	Jawad	PTV		
2004	Sassi	Saaju	PTV		
2005	Aadhi Dhoop		PTV		
2006	Malangi	Malangi	PTV		
2006	Lagan	Sermad	PTV		
2007	Abhi Door Hai Kinara		PTV		
2007	Man-o-Salwa	Karam	Hum TV		
2008	Kisay Aawaz Doon		PTV		
2008	Chubhan		PTV		
2009	Khuda Zameen Se Gaya Nahin		PTV		
2009	Noorpur Ki Rani	Salar	Hum TV		
2010	Mein Mar Gai Shoukat Ali	Mehar Salar	A-Plus		
2010	Mera Saaein	Malik Wajahat	ARY Digital		
2010-2011	Aankh Salamat Andhay Log	Gulfam	A-Plus		
2011	Kuch Khwab Thay Meray		ARY Digital		
2011	Jo Chale To Jaan Se Guzar Gaye	Sayed Alim Shah	Geo Entertainment		
2011	Ek Nazar Meri Taraf		Geo Entertainment		
2011	Jal Pari		Geo Entertainment		
2011	Aao Kahani Buntay Hain		PTV		
2011	Sanjha	Hukum	Hum TV		
2012	Mehar Bano aur Shah Bano	Faraz	Hum TV		
2012	Durr-e-Shahwar	Haider	Hum TV		
2012	Pehli Aandhi Mosam Ki		TV One	Episodic appearance	
2012	Sargoshi		Urdu 1		
2012	Badi Aapa	Farman	Hum TV		
2012	Pathjar Ke Baad		Urdu 1		
2012	Samjhauta Express	Purohit	PTV		
2012	Kami Reh Gaee	Waqar	PTV		
2013	Rehaai	Waseem	Hum TV		
2013	Qarz		ARY Digital		
2013	Ullu Baraye Farokht Nahi	Mian Ghulam Farid	Hum TV		
2013	Jaan Hatheli Par		Urdu 1		
2013	Toote Hue Taare	Saleem	ARY Digital	Appeared in 5 episodes	
2014	Bay Emaan Mohabbat	Nabeel	ARY Digital		
2014	Dil Majboor Sa Lage		Express Entertainment		
2014	Bashar Momin	Zafar	Geo Entertainment	Special appearance	
2014	Ek Mohabbat Kay Baad		ARY Digital		
2014	Jackson Heights	Imran Bhatti	Urdu 1		
2015	Zinda Dargor	Dr. Mustafa	ARY Digital		
2015	Kaise Huaye Benaam	Faris	Geo Entertainment		
2016	Zindagi Aur Kitne Zakham	Behram Ali Shah	TV One		
2016	Bhai	Ashraf	A-Plus		
2016	Mein Sitara	Ilyas Khawaja	TV One		
2016	Mann Pyasa	Zeeshan Shah	TV One		
2016	Dumpukht - Aatish-e-Ishq	Peer Habib Ullah	A-Plus		
2016	Sang-e-Mar Mar	Gulistan Khan	Hum TV		
2016	Mere Humnawa		ARY Digital		
2016	Ahsas	Adil	Urdu 1		
2016	Jaan'nisar		A-Plus		
2016	Sakeena		A-Plus		
2017	Pinjra	Aurangzeb (Ranga) Mazari	A-Plus		
2017	Farz	Chief Malik	PTV		
2017	Khan	Khan Haqdar Khan	Geo Entertainment		
2017	Laut Ke Chalay Aana	Farhan	Geo Entertainment		
2017	O Rangreza	Khayam Sani	Hum TV		
2017	Imam Zamin	Muneeb	TV One		
2017	Shayad	Salaar	Geo Entertainment		
2017	Dar Jaati Hai Sila	Jawad "Joyee"	Hum TV		
2018	Ghamand	Maqsood	A-Plus		
2018	Bewaja		PTV		
2018	Marham	Zarak Khan	BOL Entertainment		
2020	Dunk	Humayun Ahmed	ARY Digital	Episodes 1–6	
2021	Dil Na Umeed To Nahi	Tariq Masood "TM"	TV One; PTV		
2021	Raqeeb Se	Maqsood	Hum TV		
2021	Parizaad	Behroze Kareem	Hum TV	Episodes 10–16	
2021	Dobara	Hidayatullah	Hum TV	Only in flashbacks	
2022	Sang-e-Mah	Haji Marjaan Khan	Hum TV		
2022	Kaisi Teri Khudgarzi	Nawabzada Dilawar	ARY Digital		
2023	Mayi Ri	Zaheer	ARY Digital	Episode 1–19	
2023	Gunjal	Dilawar	Aur Life		
2024	Hum Dono	Ejaz Durrani	Hum TV		
2024	Radd	Laeeq	ARY Digital		
2024	Bismil	Tauqeer Taseer aka T.T.	ARY Digital		
2024	Duniyapur	Nauroz Adam	Green Entertainment		
2025	Parwarish	Jahangir	ARY Digital		
2025	Sharpasand	Farasat Ali	ARY Digital		

=== Webseries ===
Year	Title	Role	Network	Notes	Ref.
2019	Saat Mulaqatein	Husband	Nashpati Prime	Webseries debut	.
2022	Mrs. & Mr. Shameem	Shameem “Shammo”	ZEE5		
2024	Abdullahpur Ka Devdas	Shahansha	ZEE5		

=== Host ===
Year	Program	Channel
2013–2015	Mazaaq Raat	Dunya TV
2021-cont	G Sarkar	Neo News

== Awards and nominations ==
Year	Work	Award	Result	Ref
Hum Awards
2009	Khamoshiyan	Best TV Actor – Satellite	Won	
2012	Bari Aapa	Best Actor	Won	
PTV Awards
2012	Dil Behkay Ga	Best Actor Jury	Won	

=== Lux Style Awards ===
Ceremony	Category	Project	Result	Ref
1st Lux Style Awards	Best TV Actor	N/A	Won	
5th Lux Style Awards	Best TV Actor (Terrestrial)	Sassi	Won	
6th Lux Style Awards	Best TV Actor (Terrestrial)	Malangi	Won	
6th Lux Style Awards	Best TV Actor (Satellite)	Dohri	Won	
7th Lux Style Awards	Best TV Actor (Satellite)	Man-O-Salwa	Nominated	
8th Lux Style Awards	Best TV Actor (Satellite)	Khamoshiyan	Won	
8th Lux Style Awards	Best TV Actor (Terrestrial)	Mussafat	Nominated	
9th Lux Style Awards	Best TV Actor (Terrestrial)	Kaghaz Ki Nao	Won	
11th Lux Style Awards	Best TV Actor (Terrestrial)	Ao Kahani Buntay Hain	Won	
11th Lux Style Awards	Best TV Actor (Satellite)	Mera Saaein	Nominated	
12th Lux Style Awards	Best TV Actor (Terrestrial)	Qeemat	Won	
13th Lux Style Awards	Best TV Actor (Terrestrial)	Kami Reh Gaee	Won	
13th Lux Style Awards	Best TV Actor (Terrestrial)	Dil Awaiz	Nominated	
13th Lux Style Awards	Best TV Actor (Satellite)	Rehaai	Nominated	
13th Lux Style Awards	Best TV Actor (Satellite)	Ullu Baraye Farokht Nahi	Nominated	
15th Lux Style Awards	Best TV Actor	Zinda Dargor	Nominated	
16th Lux Style Awards	Best TV Actor	Dampukht	Nominated	
17th Lux Style Awards	Best TV Actor	Pinjra	Nominated	
18th Lux Style Awards	Best TV Actor (Critics' Choice)	Dar Si Jaati Hai Sila	Won	
22nd Lux Style Awards	Best TV Actor (Critics' Choice)	Kaisi Teri Khudgarzi	Nominated	
24th Lux Style Awards	Best TV Actor (Viewers' Choice)	Bismil	Nominated	
24th Lux Style Awards	Best TV Actor (Viewers' Choice)	Duniyapur	Nominated	
