= Azra Aftab =

Pakistani actress

- عذرا آفتاب
- Born: 23 November 1958 (age 67); Karachi, Pakistan
- Occupations: Actress; Radio Artist; Newscaster
- Years active: 1974 – present
- Children: 2

Azra Aftab is a Pakistani actress. She is known for her roles in dramas Dhuwan, Manzil, Laag, Dasht and Madiha Maliha.

== Early life ==
Azra was born on 23 November 1958 in Karachi, Pakistan. She joined the Pakistan Television (PTV) in 1974 as a newscaster.

== Career ==
She started working as an Urdu newscaster on PTV and Radio Pakistan in Quetta. Later Azra appeared in dramas on PTV in 1990. She was noted for her roles in the dramas Laag, Manzil, Mohabbat Rooth Jaye Toh, Farz, Hazaron Khwahishen, and Aasmanon Pay Likha. She also appeared in the dramas Khuda Zameen Se Gaya Nahin, Kaghaz Kay Phool, Ek Sitam Aur Sahi, Aankh Bhar Asman and Chalo Phir Se Jee Kar Dekhain. Since then she appeared in dramas Dil Awaiz, Pul Sirat, Pinjra, Kaise Huaye Benaam, Lakhon Mein Aik, Bhai and Bari Bahu.

== Filmography ==
=== Television ===
Year	Title	Role	Network
1992	Rait	Bibi	PTV
1993	Dasht	Duresham's mother	PTV
1993	Sheharzad	Abida	PTV
1994	Dhuwan	Dawood's mother	PTV
1995	Pukaar	Yousaf's mother	PTV
1995	Saiban Sheshay Ka	Nigar	PTV
1995	Shantul	Makhi	PTV
1996	Aahan	Aqib's mother	PTV
1998	Laag	Zubaida	PTV
1999	Wapsi Kay Baad	Kalsoom	PTV
2002	Hawa Pe Raqs	Amma	PTV
2004	Dada In Trouble	Roshan	PTV
2005	Aankh Salamat Andhey Log	Nusrat	ATV
2006	Manzil	Khanam	ARY Digital
2006	Dobara	Rani	PTV
2007	Delhi Kay Bankay	Afia	A-Plus
2007	Mithaas	Dilnaz	PTV
2007	Uss Paar	Nudrat	PTV
2008	Hazaron Khawahishen	Laiba	ATV
2009	Kaghaz Kay Phool	Asad's mother	PTV
2009	Tum Bhi Kaho	Sonia's mother	PTV
2009	Khuda Zameen Se Gaya Nahin	Naik Bakht	PTV
2010	Lahore Junction	Noreena	PTV
2010	Husan Ara Kaun	Hajra	TV One
2010	Roger	Rukshana	PTV
2011	Anokhi	Biji	A-Plus
2011	Rookhay Naina	Nani	Geo TV
2011	Kountry Luv	Chaudrani	A-Plus
2011	Mohabbat Rooth Jaye Toh	Shahnawaz's mother	Hum TV
2012	Dobaara	Rani	PTV
2012	Chalo Phir Se Jee Kar Dekhain	Razia	PTV
2012	Pehchaan	Saleha	ATV
2012	Mithaas	Shitara's mother	PTV
2012	Do Naina	Aapa Begum	Express Entertainment
2012	Ghar	Masi Sakina	PTV
2012	Mere Huzoor	Hajra	Express Entertainment
2012	Aankh Bhar Asman	Jahanara	PTV
2012	Sadiyun Se	Javaria	PTV
2012	Naqaab	Malaika's mother	PTV
2012	Madiha Maliha	Madiha's mother	Hum TV
2013	Bint e Adam	Javita's aunt	PTV
2013	Aasmanon Pay Likha	Aaliyan's grandmother	Geo Entertainment
2014	Dil Awaiz	Khaneez	PTV
2015	Kaneez	Kabir's mother	A-Plus
2015	Bari Bahu	Mona's mother	Geo Entertainment
2015	Dooriyan	Saleema	Hum TV
2015	Ek Sitam Aur Sahi	Bi Jaan	Express Entertainment
2015	Kaise Huaye Benaam	Shabana	Geo TV
2016	Pul Sirat	Zakia	ARY Zindagi
2016	Dhaani	Bee Jee	Geo TV
2016	Bhai	Shakila	A-Plus
2017	Painjra	Nasreen	A-Plus
2017	Farz	Aliya's mother	PTV
2017	Shayad	Saalar Mother	Geo Entertainment
2018	Lakhon Mein Aik	Bibi Jaan	TV One
2019	Satrangi	Gaiti	A-Plus
2020	Barish Mein Aag	Bari Bibi	LTN Family
2021	Ruswaiyaan	Qasim's mother	SAB TV
2023	Jeevan Nagar	Farida	Green Entertainment
2024	Fanaa	Samina's mother	Green Entertainment

=== Telefilm ===
Year	Title	Role
2004	Bazar	Rehmat Bibi
2020	Ghanti	Aapa

=== Film ===
Year	Title	Role
2016	Hijrat	Mehwish
2018	Darling tere liyee	Najia
2019	Kaaf Kangana	Kangana's mother

== Awards and nominations ==
Year	Award	Category	Result	Title	Ref.
1993	PTV Award	Best Actress	Won	Dasht	
1994	PTV Award	Best Actress	Won	Dhuwan	
2008	7th Lux Style Awards	Best TV Actress Terrestrial	Nominated	Hazaron Khawahishen	
2016	Cultural Organization	Lifetime Achievement Award	Won	Arts	
