= 17th PTV Awards =

Pakistani awards

17th PTV Awards (Tribute to Excellence)
- The promotional logo of the Fair and Lovely 17th PTV Awards, 2012
- Awarded for: Achievements in Television
- Date: 30 June 2012.
- Site: Expo Center, Karachi
- Hosted by: Main Host(s): Saba Qamar; Imran Abbas; Co Host(s): Nadia Ali; Mikaal Zulfiqar
- Preshow hosts: 30 June 2012.
- Produced by: Sayed Shakir Uzair
- Directed by: Farrukh Bashir
- Organized by: ptv.com.pk

Highlights
- Best Picture: Aurat Ka Ghar Koun Sa
- Best Direction: Owais Khan (Dil Behkay Ga)
- Best Actor: Noman Ejaz (Dil Behkay Ga)
- Best Actress: Saba Qamar (Tera Pyar Nahi Bhoolay)
- Most awards: Dil Behkay Ga (4)
- Most nominations: Payal (9); Tera pyar Nahi Bhoolay (7); Aurat Ka Ghar Koun Sa (7)

Television coverage
- Channel: Pakistan Television Corporation
- Network: PTV
- Duration: 2 Hours, 45 Minutes (approx.)3 hours, 15 minutes (with commercial) 2 hours, 45 minutes (without commercial)
- Ratings: 25.75

The 17th annual PTV National Awards took place on 11 June 2012 and was aired on 30 June 2012. The awards were presented by the Pakistan Television Corporation (PTV) to honor the best drama programs on Pakistani television of the preceding 12 months. The ceremony was held at the Jinnah Convention Centre in Islamabad, Islamabad Capital Territory (ICT) and the hosts were Saba Qamar, Imran Abbas, Nadia Ali, and Mikaal Zulfiqar. The event had the highest number of viewers for the awards show since the first PTV Awards in 1970. The aim of the awards ceremony is to encourage and foster television talent in Pakistan.

Dil Behkay Ga won the highest number of awards for a single nominee with four awards, including 'Best Drama Director' for Owais Khan. Aurat Ka Ghar Koun SA won three awards, including 'Best Playwright Series'. Juno and Tera Pyar Nahi Bhoole won two awards. Other winners were Jina Tu Hai, Payal (which got nine nominations), and Kachra Kundi, Virsa, Ramadan Transmission, Hama Tan Goosh and Raat Gaye with one award each. Saba Qamar won the 'Best Actress' award for her role in Tera Pyar Nahi Bhoole, and Noman Ejaz won the 'Best Actor' award, 24 years into his acting career, for his portrayal of a popular character in Dil Behkay Ga.

== 17th PTV Red Carpet Event ==
The Red Carpet Show for the 17th PTV Awards was hosted by the Pakistani model and actress Nadia Hussain on 30 June 2012.

== Purpose ==
PTV presents the Annual Awards to honor Pakistani public figures and promote emerging new talents in the Pakistani television drama scene, aiming to host the awards ceremony every year since its establishment in 1970. Each year, PTV chooses a tag line that best represents its prevalent theme. This year the PTV Awards tag line was "kasb-e-Kamal kun", which translates to "Tribute to Excellence".

== Guest speaker ==
The Guest of Honor was former Pakistani Prime Minister; Yousaf Raza Gilani, accompanied by Information Minister Qamar Zaman Kaira, Federal Minister Syed Khursheed Ahmed Shah, Railway Minister Ghulam Ahmad Bilour, Taimur Azmat Usman, PTV Managing Director Yousaf Baig Mirza, and Interior Minister of Pakistan Rehman Malik. In his address, Gilani stated that the country is surrounded by depression and hopelessness and the PTV awards played a key role in lifting up the morale and spirits of the nation.

Pakistani government ministers Rehman Malik and Qamar Zaman Kaira gave away awards to the winning actors and actresses.

== Winners and nominees ==
The nominees for the 17th PTV Awards were announced on 12 May 2012. Viewer’s Choice Awards were also there and were officially open for polling by PTV for the categories of 'Best Actor' and 'Best Actress'. The TV Drama category receiving the most nominations was Payal with nine, followed by Tera Pyar Nahi Bhoole and Aurat Ka Ghar Koun SA with seven nominations.

== Awards ==
The Winners are listed first.

Best Playwright Series	Best Drama Director Series
Seema Ghazal for—Aurat Ka Ghar Koun Sa; Dr. Qazi Fasih for --Kachra Kundi; Iqbal Hassan Khan for --Jina Tu Hai; Muhammad Asif for --Payal; Dr. Anwar Sajjad for --Dil Behkay Ga	Owais Khan for—Dil Behkay Ga; Faisal Bukhari for --Payal; Fouzia Siddique for --Tera Pyar Nahi Bhoole; M. Javed Fazil (Late) and M. Arif Khan for --Aurat Ka Ghar Koun Sa; Ahsan Ali Zaidi for --Kaisi Yeh Agan
Best Playwright Independent Play	Best Producer Independent Play
Ayub Khoso for—Jaanu; Anwar Maqsood for --Siyasi Eid; Dr. Ali arsalan for --Dastak; Shakeel Adnan Hashmi for --Qurbani Qabool Hoi; Imam Shah for --Chand Nazzar nahi Aya	Attalullah Baloch for Jaanu; Afifa Sofia Al-Hussani for --Salma Ka Balma; Asad Jamil for --Dastak; Shakeel Adnan Hashmi for --Qurbani Qabool Hoi; Aziz Ejaz for --Chand Nazzar nahi Aya
Best Drama Production	Best Producer Drama Serial
7th Sky Entertainment for—Aurat ka Ghar Koun Sa; J-Zee for --Payal; Pinnacle for --Dil Behkay Ga; SMR International for --Tera Pyar Nahi Bhoole; Six Sigma for --Kaisi Yeh Agan	Tariq Mairaj for—Jeena Tou Hai; Kazm Pasha for --Smundar Jheel Kaisay Ho; Sajjad Ahmad for --Sehra Teri Pyas; Ayub Babai for --Bezuban; Manzoor Qureshi for --Mushkbaar
Best Actor Jury	Best Actress Jury
Noman Ejaz for—Dil Behkay Ga; Babar Ali for --Nazar; Javaid Sheikh for --Payal; Sohail Sameer for --Jeena Tou hai; Ahsan Khan for --Tera Pyar Nahi Bhoole	Saba Qamar for—Tera Pyar Nahi Bhoole; Sanam Baloch for --Sehra Teri Pyas; Resham for --Payal; Maria Wasti for --Aurat Ka Ghar Koun Sa; Sara Loren(Mona Liza) for --Kaisi Yeh Agan
Best Actor Viewers	Best Actress Viewers
Ahsan Khan for—Tera Pyar Nahi Bhoole; Babar Ali for --Nazar; Javaid Sheikh for --Payal; Sohail Sameer for --Jeena tou hai; Noman Ejaz for --Dil Behkay Ga	Maria Wasti for—Aurat Ka Ghar Koun Sa--; Sanam Baloch for --Sehra Teri Pyas; Resham for --Payal; Saba Qamar for --Tera Pyar Nahi Bhoole; Sara Loren(Mona Liza) for --Kaisi Yeh Agan
Best Supporting Actor	Best Supporting Actress
Saleem Sheikh for — Dil Behkay Ga; Javaid Jamal for --Kachra Kundi; Kamran Mujahid for --Sehra Teri Pyas; Batin Farooqi for --Jeena Tou hai; Faisal Rehman for --Phir Bi Na Janay	Arjumand Raheem for—Dil Behkay Ga-; Zeb Chaudhry for --Payal; Kiran Shah for --Jeena Tou Hai; Juggan Kazim for --Phir Bi Na Janay; Rubina Ashraf for --Aurat ka Ghar Koun Sa
Best Anchor of the year	Best Producer Music Shows Event
Wasi Shah for—Raat Gaye; Noor for --Noor Morning Show; Yousaf Salah-ud-Din and Ifat Umar for --Virsa; Zeba for --Mehfil-e-Shab; Sundas Jameel for --Ghar Ki Baat	Amjad Shah for—Hama-Tan Goosh(solo nominee)
Best Original Soundtrack	Best Singer Light Music
Waqar Ali for—Kachra Kundi--; Naveed Wajid Ali Nashad for --Tera Pyar Nahi Bhoole; Farrukh Abid and Shoaib Farrukh for—Aurat Ka Ghar Koun Sa'; Waqar Ali for --Kaisi Yeh Agan; Ameer Ali for --Payal	Sanam Marvi for—Virsa; Amber Mehak for --Mehfhil-e-Shab; Fariha Pervez --Special Song (Urnay Do)--; Muzaffar Khurasani for --Regional Award--; Sitara Younis for --Special Song (Cricket Team)--
Best Special Transmission	Tribute to Pakistani Legends
--Ramadan transmission, Lahore-Center--; --Ramadan Transmission, Karachi-Center--; --Flood transmission, Islamabad-Center--	Waheed Murad(Actor); Rahat Fateh Ali Khan (Singer); Khawaja Khurshid Anwar (filmmaker/writer/director/music composer ); Abida Parveen (Singer)

== PTV Awards in Future ==
The PTV Awards are the longest-running award ceremony in Pakistan which has honored the new talents in every field consistently for 43 years since the first award ceremony in 1970, and is the main television awards show for honoring the art and culture of Pakistani TV Dramas. PTV awards are often compared with the Indian Television Academy Awards and the American Emmy Awards. The 18th PTV Annual Awards are expected to be held on 4 July 2013 at Jinnah Convention Centre in Islamabad, Islamabad Capital Territory (ICT), Pakistan.
