= Ayub Khosa =

Pakistani actor of film and TV (born 1960)

- ایوب کھوسہ
- Born: 1959 (age 66–67); Khuzdar, Balochistan, Pakistan
- Occupation: Actor
- Years active: 1983–present
- Children: 4

Ayub Khosa (Urdu: ایوب کھوسہ; born 1959) is a Pakistani actor of film and TV. With a career spanning more than three decades – mostly in television – Khosa is a well-known name in Pakistan. He is known for his roles in films like Khuda Kay Liye (2007). Outside Urdu, he has also performed in Balochi and Pashto plays.

== Early life and education ==
Khosa was born in Khuzdar, Balochistan to a Pashtun mother and a Baloch father.

He is a graduate of the University of Balochistan. He is fluent in Balochi, Pashto, Brahui, Sindhi, Urdu and English.

== Acting career ==
He began his acting career in school, and became a professional actor in 1983. His first appearance on TV was the drama Chhaon that was telecast from PTV Quetta Centre.

== Political career ==
Ayub Khosa contested election on a Pakistan Peoples Party ticket from the PS-101 (Karachi East-III) seat in the 2018 Pakistan general elections. He secured 5121 votes and lost to Firdous Naqvi of Pakistan Tehreek-e-Insaf.

== Public image ==
In 2011 the Pakistan National Council of Arts dedicated an evening to Khosa in recognition for his contribution to the television industry in Pakistan. A play titled Main Kaun Hoon (Who AM I) was screened to showcase his work. The play was directed by Shoaib Khaliq and acted by Khosa himself.

== Selected filmography ==
=== Television series ===
Year	Title	Role	Network	Notes
1983	Mum	Rehan	PTV	
1985	Aabru	Waqar	PTV	
1986	Chhaon	Taimoor	PTV	
1988	Padash	Tariq	PTV	
1988	Satoon	Hayat	PTV	
1990	Chakar-e-Azam	Meer Jharo	PTV	
1993	Dasht	Mir Guwaraam	NTM	
1994	Shantul	Agha Gul Mohammed	PTV	
1994	Gardbad	Sardar Zorawar	PTV	
1995	Pukaar	Alfanso	PTV	
1996	Aahan	Ron	PTV	ISPR production on the Special Service Group (SSG)
1996	Wapsi	Salman	PTV	
1997	Wapsi Kay Baad	Salman	PTV	
1997	Kali Chaddar	Peer Baksh	PTV	
1998	Pinjra	Akhandi	PTV	
1999	Amanat	Allahdad (Kakoo)	PTV	
2000	Zanjeer	Hanan	PTV	
2000	Aan	Khaliq Khan	PTV	
2000	Intizar	Ghosu	PTV	
2000	Darwaza	Qadir	PTV	
2004	Sassi	Akbar Khan	PTV	
2009	Khuda Zameen Se Gaya Nahin Hai	Khaista Gul	PTV	Nominated 9th Lux Style Awards Best TV Actor (Terrestrial)
2009	Jinnah Ke Nām	Nawab Inayatullah Khan	PTV	
2015	Neelum Kināre	Professor Riaz	Hum TV	
2019	Dil Lagi	Doraan Khan	KTN	Sindhi drama
2022	Dushman	Billa "Munshi"	PTV	
2026	Humrahi	Lala	Geo TV	
2026	Jahannum Ba'raasta Jannat	Rasheed Khan	Green TV	

=== Films ===
Year	Title	Role	Notes
2007	Khuda Kay Liye		Cameo role
2014	O21	Abdullah	Nominated 14th Lux Style Awards Best Film Actor
2015	Welcome 2 Karachi	Taliban leader Agha Jaan	Bollywood debut
2015	Swaarangi	Saieen	
2016	Hijrat		
2016	Revenge of the Worthless	Ameer Qudratuullah	
2016	Yalghaar	Col. Jogezai	
2016	Jashan		Pashto film

== Awards and nominations ==
Year	Award	Nominated work	Category	Result
2007	6th Lux Style Awards	Sadoori	Best TV Actor (Terrestrial)	Nominated
2010	9th Lux Style Awards	Khuda Zameen Se Gaya Nahin	Best TV Actor (Terrestrial)	Nominated
2012	17th PTV Awards	Jaanu	Best Playwright (Independent Play)	Won
2015	14th Lux Style Awards	O21	Best Film Actor	Nominated
