= Miki Kharo England =

- Miki Kharo England
- Written by: Anjum Malik
- Directed by: Anjum Malik
- Starring: Iftikhar Thakur; Shahzada Ghaffar; Hameed Babar; Ghazala Butt
- Countries of origin: Pothohar, Punjab Pakistan
- Original language: Pothwari

Production
- Producer: Anjum Malik

Original release
- Release: 2006

Miki Kharo England, released in 2006, was the first ever Pothwari comedy telefilm. Miki Kharo England, which translates to Take Me to England, is about a man named Aftab, who wants to get married and live his life in England.

== Plot ==
Aftab (Iftikhar Thakur) is very humorous, fun loving and a Sai'n (simpleton), who does not really have a fixed occupation and enjoys roaming around the village with his two best friends, Shahid a.k.a. 'Shedu' (Anjum Malik) and Mithu (Shahzada Ghaffar). Mithu and Aftab are mischievous in nature and are constantly involved in shenanigans, whilst Shedu is a reserved character and level-headed. The trio share a keen interest in Cricket

Aftab's cousin 'Tina' (Shagufta Qureshi), along with Aftab's auntie, Azra, (Ghazala Butt) travel from London to Aftab's village in Pakistan. Aftab's mum instantly takes a shine to Tina and wishes for Aftab to marry her. Tina agrees to spend some time with Aftab to get to know him but quickly notices his peculiar behaviour and dim-wittedness. Tina ultimately rejects Aftab and instead falls in love with his friend Shedu.

There is a running gag in the drama in where Aftab contantly refers to his auntie Azra as Azra Ni Khala, (which translates to Azra's Auntie), much to the annoyance of Azra herself.

Towards the end of the drama, Azra Ni Khala suggests Aftab marry someone from England and she knows a girl whom is willing. A telephone Nikah (Islamic marriage contract) is arranged by Azra between Aftab and his potential match. After the Nikah takes place, Aftab becomes very exited at the prospect of going to England and living there with his newly wedded wife. Shedu also marries Tina and they host a wedding ceremony in the village, with a traditional song performance and dance.

== Popularity ==
Miki Kharo England was very popular upon its release amongst the Pothwari/Mirpuri community.. Some of the dialogue and catchphrases made it memorable.

It was originally watched on DVD and nearly every video store in Pakistan stocked a copy.

== Cast ==
- Iftikhar Thakur as Aftab (Sain)
- Shahzada Ghaffar as Mithu
- Hameed Babar as Chacha Khabri
- Anjum Malik as Shahid (Shedu)
- Shagufta Qureshi as Tina
- Rukhsana Khan as Musarato (Aftabs Sister)
- Baitan Farooqi as Meeru (Mithus Dad)
- Ghazala Butt as Azra "Azra Ni Khala" (Tina's Mum) (Lubna-Ghazal Butt)
- Ifut Chaudhry as Zubeda (Aftabs Mum)
- Shabbir Mirza as Aftabs Dad

== Sequel ==
A sequel, Main Julian England (I'm going to England), was released in 2007.
