= Shamoon Abbasi =

Italian-born Pakistani actor

- شمعون عباسی
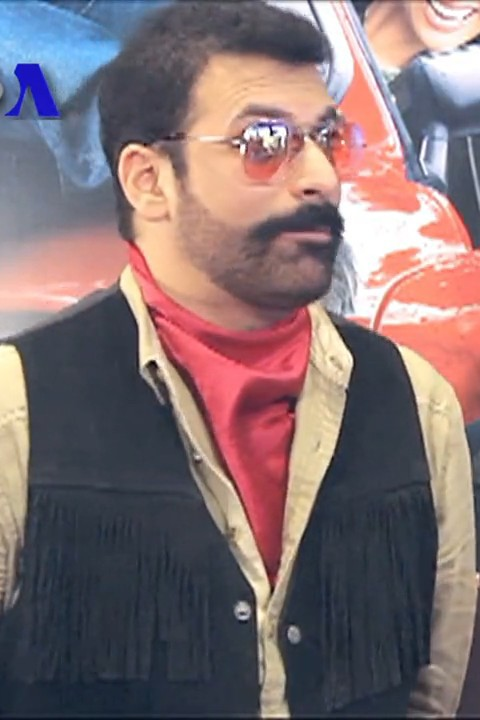
- Abbasi in 2014
- Born: 4 April 1973 (age 53)
- Occupations: Actor; Director; Producer; Screenwriter
- Years active: 1997–present
- Spouses: Javeria Abbasi (m. 1997; div. 2009) Humaima Malick (m. 2009; div. 2010) Javairia Randhawa (m. 2010; div. 2014) Sherry Shah (m. 2023)
- Children: Anzela Abbasi; Ezzah Abbasi
- Father: Zubair Abbasi
- Relatives: Anoushay Abbasi (sister); Qainat Qavi (sister); Seema Ghazal (aunt); Syed Ali Raza Usama (cousin); Sameena Aijaz (cousin); Moiz Abbas (nephew)

Shamoon Abbasi (Urdu: شمعون عباسی; born 4 April 1973) is a Pakistani actor, director, producer and screenwriter, best known for portraying villain roles.

== Early life and family ==
Abbasi grew up as a footballer, captaining the U-17 team at school level.

His father, Zubair Abbasi, was a novelist and drama writer, as is his aunt, Seema Ghazal. His aunt's son, Syed Ali Raza Usama, is a well-known director. Zubair's younger brother, Uzair Abbasi, was a television actor.

== Career ==
=== Actor ===
Abbasi began his acting career in 1997 with Titli, a telefilm by Yasir Akhtar, before getting recognition for his comic role in the PTV drama Kashish in 1999. The same year, he turned director with the thriller Karoron ka Aadmi. In 2022, he starred in the drama Bakhtawar.

In 2013, he played the role of Ramal, the main antagonist in the box-office success Waar. In 2023, he played the role of alleged Indian spy Kulbhushan Jadhav, in the movie Dhai Chaal.

=== Producer ===
In the early 2000s, he launched one of the country's first mystery and action serials, and also played a key role in scouting and promoting emerging talent, including actors such as Neelum Munir, Mohib Mirza, and Adnan Shah Tipu. His short films Mein Rahoon Gi and Zinda were both nominated for awards, with Zinda receiving critical acclaim.

== Controversies ==
=== Domestic abuse allegations (2019) ===
Abbasi faced controversy in 2019 following allegations of domestic abuse made by his ex-wife, actress Humaima Malick. Malick shared on social media that she had endured an abusive marriage and a subsequent toxic relationship, stating, "I was threatened, abused, and beaten to death not once but many times."

As of now, there have been no legal proceedings or formal charges against Abbasi related to these allegations.

== Filmography ==
=== Television serials ===
Year	Title	Actor	Director	Cinematographer	Writer	Network	Notes
1999	Kashish	Yes				PTV	
1999	Karoron Ka Admi		Yes			PTV	
1999	Muskaan		Yes			PTV	
2009	Noor Pur Ki Rani	Yes				Hum TV	
2010	Daddy	Yes				Ary Digital	
2010	Thori Si Wa Chahiye	Yes				Geo Entertainment	
2011	Choti Si Kahani	Yes				PTV	
2012	Nikhar Gaye Gulab Sare	Yes				Hum TV	
2013	Woh	Yes		Yes		Hum TV	
2014	Iqraar	Yes				Geo Entertainment	
2015	Yeh Junoon	Yes				TV One	
2017	Phir Wohi Mohabbat	Yes				Hum TV	
2017	Jalti Rait Per	Yes				TV One	
2019	Gunnah	Yes				APlus TV	
2020	Chalawa		Yes			Hum TV	
2022	Bakhtawar	Yes				Hum TV	
2023	Ziddi	Yes				Aan TV	
2024	Akhara	Yes				Green Entertainment	
2025	Jinn Ki Shadi Unki Shadi				Yes	Hum TV	
2025	Meri Zindagi Hai Tu	Yes				ARY Digital	

=== Telefilms ===
Year	Title	Director	Network
1997	Titlee		NTM
1997	Chand		NTM
2013	Behadd		Hum TV
2014	Babban Mian Ki Begum Billo		ARY Digital
2021	Khauff		Express Entertainment
2021	Tu Heer Main Tera Hero		LTN
2025	Begunah	Yes	Green Entertainment

=== Films ===
Year	Title	Role	Notes	Ref.
2011	Bhai Log	Inspector Nagra		
2013	Waar	Ramal		
2014	O21	Danish		
2015	Manto	Eishar Singh		
2016	Sawal 700 Crore Dollar Ka	Super Cop		
2017	Raasta	Shahnawaz		
2018	Parwaaz Hai Junoon			
2019	Gumm: In the Middle of Nowhere	Haider		
2019	Durj	Gul Bakhsh	Also director and screenwriter	
2022	Ishrat Made in China	Master BP		
2022	Chaudhry – The Martyr	Goti		
2023	Daadal	Saulat Pasha		
2023	Huey Tum Ajnabi	Mukti Bahini commander		
2023	Dhai Chaal	Kulbhushan Jadhav		
2026	Delhi Gate	Malik Gold		

=== Web series ===
Year	Title	Actor	Director	Producer	Screenwriter	Network
2021	Karachi Division	Yes	Yes	Yes	Yes	Starzplay
2022	Mind Games	Yes				Shami Media
