= Bari Bahu =

- Title screen
- Genre: Family drama Soap opera
- Written by: Shakeel Ahmed
- Directed by: Furqan Adam
- Starring: Maira Khan; Shahood Alvi; Suzain Fatima; Azra Aftab
- Country of origin: Pakistan
- Original language: Urdu
- No. of episodes: 59

Production
- Producers: Asif Raza Mir; Babar Javed
- Production location: Karachi
- Running time: Approx 40 Minutes
- Production company: A&B Entertainment

Original release
- Network: Geo Entertainment
- Release: 13 January – 13 May 2015

Bari Bahu is a 2015 Pakistani drama serial directed by Furqan Adam, produced by A&B Entertainment and written by Shakeel Ahmed. The drama stars Maira Khan, Shahood Alvi, Suzain Fatima and Azra Aftab in lead roles, and was first aired on 16 November 2016 on Geo Entertainment, where it aired twice a week.

== Plot ==
The drama serial revolves around domestic politics in a family. Mona has a typical eastern wife disposition, like a loving, caring and docile personality, whose husband happens to be as angelic as she is. Although Mona's husband is quite mature and responsible, who is always sacrificing to strengthen the family bond, her brother-in-law Naeem has totally opposite personality traits. He is a naturally corrupt, scheming and artful fellow. Their only sister Shehla is married with their maternal cousin, Asif.

Mona is the eldest daughter-in-law in this joint household which is led by a matriarch. Naeem's habit of taking advantage and emotionally blackmailing his elder brother for money soon surfaces. Mona silently observes his actions. Later on, Naeem is then joined by Asif in his diabolic schemes against Mona and his brother. Different kinds of jiggery-pokery and domestic politics come into limelight as the play progresses towards conclusion.

== Cast ==
- Azra Aftab
- Shahood Alvi
- Maira Khan
- Suzain Fatima
- Imran Rizvi
- Amir Qureshi
- Salina Sipra
- Beena Chaudhary as Mona's mother-in-law
- Shahzad Malik
