= Durj =

- Poster
- Directed by: Shamoon Abbasi
- Written by: Shamoon Abbasi
- Based on: True Events
- Produced by: Dodi Khan; Sherry Shah
- Starring: Shamoon Abbasi; Sherry Shah; Maira Khan; Dodi Khan; Hafeez Ali
- Cinematography: Shamoon Abbasi; Ayaz Ahmed
- Edited by: Shaam Films
- Music by: Asif Noorani
- Production companies: Shaam Films; Blunt Digital
- Distributed by: Zashko Films; IMGC; Distribution Club; Green Chillies Entertainment
- Release date: 10 October 2019
- Running time: 140 minutes
- Country: Pakistan
- Language: Urdu

Durj is a 2019 Pakistani Urdu-language mystery thriller film, written and directed by Shamoon Abbasi and produced by Dodi Khan. The film stars Shamoon Abbasi, Sherry Shah, Maira Khan, Dodi Khan, Nouman Javaid and Hafeez Ali. The film is based on true events and a large part of it is about cannibalism. (Note: multiple sources:) Inspired by two actual cases of cannibalism in Pakistan, particularly that of a pair of brothers from Bhakkar who devoured over 100 corpses and were set free despite their dastardly crimes, solely because no law exists against cannibalism in Pakistan's penal code.

== Plot ==
Dr Farah Maira Khan, a Pakistani psychologist, gets access to a notorious recaptured cannibal, Gul Buksh Shamoon Abbasi, incarcerated in a high security prison. Dr Farah's objective is to find her missing journalist husband. And she strongly suspects Buksh might have the answer.

Throwing her professional career and caution to the winds, Farah manages to kidnap a chained Buksh from solitary confinement and takes him to a place where she can grill him. While the entire local elite police force is activated to search for them, Farah tries to elicit answers from the serial cannibal – but it is not that simple. Hardened by years of societal neglect and police brutality, Buksh responds to her aggression with amusement, and turns the tables on her, forcing her to listen to aspects of his life she would rather not know or hear.

Durj does not indulge in depicting gory details, there are only suggestions of it, yet the hideousness of digging up graves, hunting for humans and, cooking and devouring their flesh are all creatively implied – the hallmark of a talented director. Producer Shamoon Abbasi not only directed the film, but wrote the screenplay and played the villainous lead.

== Cast ==
- Shamoon Abbasi as Gul Bakhsh
- Sherry Shah as Laali
- Maira Khan as Farah
- Dodi Khan
- Hafeez Ali

== Production ==
In an interview with Dawn News, Abbasi stated that the film was inspired by true events which took place in Punjab and that although the film is based on Cannibalism it has multiple stories merged into one; "Durj's plot does not just revolve around cannibalism, it is about a cannibal but we have multiple stories. There are three stories which merge into one." The film crew had to research which took about a year to collect data on cases before starting work on the story line.
