= Babban Khala Ki Betiyann =

Pakistani television drama series

- Genre: Family drama Serial
- Created by: Fahad Mustafa
- Written by: Mansoor Ahmed Khan
- Directed by: Syed Atif Hussain
- Opening theme: Bikhar Rahi Hai Roz-o-Shab
- Ending theme: Kyun Soh Rahi Hai Zindagi Kyun Ajnabi Hai Zindagi
- Country of origin: Pakistan
- Original language: Urdu
- No. of seasons: 1
- No. of episodes: 48

Production
- Producers: Fahad Mustafa; Dr. Ali Kazmi
- Production locations: Karachi, Sindh
- Camera setup: Multi-camera setup
- Running time: 40 minutes
- Production company: Big Bang Entertainment

Original release
- Network: ARY Digital
- Release: 21 June 2018 – 8 June 2019

Babban Khala Ki Betiyan (Urdu: ببن خالہ کی بیٹیاں, lit. 'Aunt Babban's Daughters') is a 2018 Pakistani drama serial that premiered on 21 June 2018 on ARY Digital. It is directed by Syed Atif Hussain and written by Mansoor Ahmed Khan. It stars Zaheen Tahira, Qavi Khan, Saima Noor, Sana Fakhar, Javeria Abbasi, and Maria Wasti. The serial is produced by Fahad Mustafa and Ali Kazmi under their banner Big Bang Entertainment. The show is the longest running Pakistani weekly series; beating Alif Allah Aur Insaan on Hum TV. The show ended on 8 June 2019 with 48 episodes; creating a record for Pakistani television.

== Cast ==
- Zaheen Tahira as Babban khala
- Qavi Khan as Basharat
- Saima Noor as Ishrat (Dead)
- Sana Fakhar as Durdana aka Dolly
- Javeria Abbasi as Musarat aka Mommi
- Maria Wasti as Habiba aka Billo
- Faryal Mehmood as Bisma aka Baby (Dead)
- Farah Nadir as Asad's stepmother
- Srha Asghar as aneesa aka Bubbly
- Sameena Nazir as Najma Aunty
- Ghazala Butt as Ruqaiya Phupo
- Tariq Jameel as Munawwar Phupa
- Shamil Khan as Qaiser (Dead)
- Hassan Ahmed as Asad
- Laiba Khan as Anam
- Ali Josh as Munna
- Maira Khan as Munna's Second Wife
- Arslan Faisal as Pappu
- Faizan Shaikh as Guddu

== Awards and nominations ==
Year	Award	Category	Recipient(s)	Result	Ref.
2019	ARY Digital- Social Media Drama Awards 2018	Best Supporting Actor (Female)	Javeria Abbasi	Nominated	
