= Titli (2017 TV series) =

- Also known as: تتلی
- Genre: Drama; Romance
- Written by: Samina Ejaz
- Directed by: Ahmed Bhatti
- Starring: Hania Aamir; Ali Abbas; (For entire cast see below)
- No. of episodes: 24

Production
- Producer: Syed Mukhtar Ahmed
- Production company: 7th Sky Entertainment

Original release
- Network: Urdu 1
- Release: 20 January – 30 June 2017

Titli (Urdu: تتلی, lit. 'Butterfly') is a Pakistani romance drama serial aired on Urdu1. It starred Ali Abbas, Hania Aamir, Emmad Irfani and Abid Ali, and was produced by 7th Sky Entertainment. The serial is based on a true story. The story follows a woman named Naila (Aamir), who marries a handsome man by the name of Ahmed (Abbas). The serial premiered on 20 January 2017, and aired every Friday on Urdu 1 until its final airing on 26 June 2017.

== Plot ==
Beautiful, egotistical Naila lives in a middle-class household with her younger sister Zara, parents and elder brother Kamran/ Kammy. Her cousin Zamee also stays with them for some time. Naila falls in love with Zamee just because of his beauty but Zamee reveals that he is in love with Naila's younger sister Zara. Devastated, Naila vengefully forces Zara to reject Zamee. Naila marries a dark-skinned but rich lad, Ahmed, just for his wealth and she proves to be a horrible wife and daughter-in-law as she talks rudely to her husband and in-laws even though they love her. Naila gets pregnant and is worried that her child will not look like the father. Luckily for Naila, she gives birth to a beautiful baby, Amna.

Naila continues to unnecessarily torture her in-laws. She spends a lot of money on shopping, buying expensive things and gifting them to her friends and others. Naila believes that her in-laws love their choti bahu more because of which she demands that Ahmed give her an independent home or divorce. Naila gives birth to another daughter Maryam and they move to a different house after an eight-year leap. Naila soon begins an extramarital affair with a lovely neighbour Rehan. She gives expensive gifts to Rehan and he enjoys the luxuries. Naila gets closer to Rehan and they start to love each other. Amna having seen Naila and Rehan together, flees with her sister towards their grandparents' home, but they get kidnapped. Amna and Maryam are saved by the police. When Ahmad asks Amna why she ran away, she tells her father about her mother, Naila, being involved with someone. Hearing this, Ahmad is shocked and one day he catches Naila with Rehan sitting in his home.

Naila returns to her parents and demands a divorce from Ahmad. Though her parents and brother try to make her understand, she remains adamant in her decision. When Naila's in-laws' come to meet and convince her, she elopes. She goes to her apartment and sends a divorce notice to her husband, Ahmad. After their divorce, Naila marries Rehan against her father and brother's wishes, leaving her daughters behind. Meanwhile, Ahmad's marries Beenish when his parents insist him, as they want Ahmad to move forward in life. Beenish looks after his daughters, Amna and Mariyam, and proves to be loving and caring wife, mother and daughter-in-law. On the other side, Naila has to do all the household chores and has to look after her in-laws. Naila realizes the difference in the treatment towards her by Ahmad and now Rehan. Rehan turns out to be a manipulative, toxic and controlling husband, who abuses Naila. One day he divorces Naila because he doubts her character. Naila walks out of Rehan's home broken and meets an accident.

== Cast ==
=== Main ===
- Hania Aamir as Naila
- Ali Abbas as Ahmad: Naila's (first) ex-husband

=== Recurring ===
- Naeem Tahir as Quyyum Sahab: Naila's father; Zamee's uncle
- Saba Faisal as Nusrat: Naila's mother
- Shameen Khan as Zara: Naila's younger sister
- Atif Rathore as Kamran aka Kaamy: Naila's brother
- Neha Laaj as Saira: Kaamy's wife
- Taqi Ahmed as Zamee: Naila's cousin and love interest
- Sameera Hassan as Suraiyya: Match-maker; Naila and Ahmed's match-maker
- Abid Ali as Zubair Sahab: Famous businessman and Ahmad's father
- Seemi Pasha as Halima: Ahmad's mother and Naila's mother-in-law
- Tauqeer Ahmed as Amir: Ahmad's younger brother
- Shahzia Shah as Kiran: Amir's wife
- Rashida Tabasum as Danish's mother and Zara's mother-in-law
- Emmad Irfani as Rehan: Naila's (second) ex-husband
- Faakhir Mehmood as Mehdi
