= Lal Mai =

2019-2020 Pakistani television horror drama

- Genre: Horror drama
- Written by: Batool Bhojani
- Directed by: Khalid Malik
- Starring: Taqi Ahmed; Shamil Khan; Hira Soomro; Sana Fakhar
- Country of origin: Pakistan
- Original language: Urdu
- No. of episodes: 52

Production
- Executive producers: Ibaad Mushtaq; Irfah Haidery; Zafar Zaidi
- Producer: Imran Khan
- Camera setup: Single-camera setup
- Production company: IK Media Production

Original release
- Network: Aaj Entertainment
- Release: 2 December 2019 – 30 November 2020

Lal Mai is a Pakistani horror drama series that premiered on Aaj Entertainment on 12 December 2019. It has Taqi Ahmed, Shamil Khan, Hira Soomro and Sana Fakhar in pivotal roles.

The shooting of the series took place in the Balakot region of northern Pakistan.

== Plot ==
The story revolves around an unborn child (child of devil) who comes back in the lives of Nauman, Seema and Mannat to take revenge, the revenge of the mistake which has not even been committed. The devil's journey starts from mountains and then reaches to cities and makes fuss there.

== Cast ==
- Taqi Ahmed as Nauman
- Shamil Khan as Khan Jee
- Sana Fakhar as Lal Mai
- Hira Soomro as Seema Nauman
- Malik Raza as Zaman
- Saleem Mairaj as Moosa
- Tariq Jameel as Malik Sahab
- Tasleem Ansari as Zubaida
- Khwaja Saleem as Siraj
- Faryal Noshad as Shehla
- Angel Kainat as Mannat
- Faraz Faheem as Noman
- Saba Shah as Gul Bano
- Rohail Khan
- Samiullah
- Mohsin Waheed
