= Taqi Ahmed =

Pakistani television and film actor

- Born: Karachi, Sindh, Pakistan
- Occupation: Actor
- Years active: 2011 – present

Taqi Ahmed is a Pakistani television and film actor. Mostly known for his work in Urdu serials, Ahmed did his acting course from the National Academy of Performing Arts and then struggled at various platforms to get his acting break. His debut series was Dekh Magar Pyar Se aired in 2011 on Aaj TV. In 2019, he made his film debut with Tevar opposite Sukaina Khan.

== Career ==
His appearances include Kaash Main Teri Beti Na Hoti, Gohar-e-Nayab, Mera Naam Yousuf Hai, Dil Awaiz, Kitni Girhain Baaki Hain, Titli, Karamat-e-Ishq, Madventures, Makafaat and Lal Mai. Currently, Ahmed is appearing in horror series Lal Mai on Aaj Entertainment.

== Filmography ==
=== Film ===
- Tevar
- Dhai Chaal (2023)

=== Television ===
Year	Title	Notes
2011	Dekh Magar Pyar Se	
2011	Kaash Main Teri Beti Na Hoti	as Duraid
2013	Gohar-e-Nayab	as Kamran
2013	Teesri Manzil	
2013	Dil Awaiz	
2013	Sanwari	
2013	Meri Maa	Salman
2013	Kitni Girhain Baaki Hain	
2015	Mera Naam Yousuf Hai	as Imran Moeez
2016	Titli	
2018	Ustani Jee	as Rukhsar's boss
2018	Karamat-e-Ishq	
2018	Madventures (season 2)	Contestant
2019	Makafaat	Episode 6
2019	Lal Mai	
2020	Mann-e-Iltija	
2025	Sher	as Ahad
