= Nashpati Prime =

Pakistani digital media company

- Company type: Private
- Website type: Video on demand
- Founded: July 2018; 8 years ago
- Headquarters: Karachi, Pakistan
- Founders: Qaiser Ali; Muhammad Rahimtoola
- Industry: Technology & Entertainment , Mass media
- Products: Streaming media; video on demand
- Website: nashpati.com

Nashpati Prime is a Pakistani digital media company based in Karachi. It serves video-on-demand content for entertainment purposes. The venture began operations in July 2018.

== Background ==
QLinksGroup initiated Nashpati Prime as part of its expansion towards a digital shift with a clear focus on providing entertainment through video on demand. The group has been previously involved with Television Productions, Post Productions, and Campaign Design for Producers, Film Makers, and Broadcasters. It has showcased various platforms, including YouTube, Facebook, Instagram, and its website.

The venture also serves as a content creator with distribution on partner platforms in the form of alliances.

== Content ==
Nashpati Prime has programs outlay from a broad spectrum of genres. Some of the projects include,

Saat Mulaqatein:

Drama web series directed by Kashif Nisar and starring Nauman Ejaz and Zara Tareen. The story revolves around a couple who fall out of love and have subsequent interactions during their course of separation.

Arpitah:

Horror web series starring Sarwat Gillani, Yasra Rizvi, Zain Afzal, and Khalid Nizami and created by Qaiser Ali.

To be Honest:

Internet celebrity talk show hosted by standup comedian Tabish Hashmi with a wide array of guests. The show was directed and created by Azfar Ali.

Khanabadosh:

Public service program hosted and conducted by drama writer Zafar Mairaj, who covers various topics concerning value systems, prejudice, human rights, and life in general.

== Recognition ==
Nashpati Prime has been credited with initiating a 'Digital First' through its show To be Honest, initially streamed on its platform and later on satellite television TV One.

== Original programming ==
Name	Release date	Genre	No. of episodes	Notes	Ref(s)
Saat Mulaqatein	28 November 2019	Web series	9	Featuring Noman Ijaz & Zara Tareen	
To Be Honest	8 January 2020	Talkshow	10		
Dastak Na Do	10 May 2020	Web series	9	Featuring Saba Hameed, Arjumand Rahim & others	
