= Khuda Zameen Se Gaya Nahin =

Pakistani television series

- Urdu: خدا زمیں سے گیا نہیں ہے
- Written by: Asghar Nadeem Syed
- Directed by: Kashif Nisar
- Starring: Ayub Khoso; Nauman Ijaz; Rasheed Naz; Syed Jibran; Ayesha Khan
- Country of origin: Pakistan
- Original language: Urdu
- No. of episodes: 16

Production
- Producer: Communication Research Strategies
- Cinematography: Qasim Ali Mureed

Original release
- Network: Hum TV; PTV Home
- Release: 2009 – 2010

Khuda Zameen Se Gaya Nahin Hai is a 2009 Pakistani television series first broadcast simultaneously on PTV Home and Hum TV. It is written by Asghar Nadeem Syed and directed by Kashif Nisar. The cast of the series includes Nauman Ijaz, Syed Jibran, Ayesha Khan, Sara Chaudhary, Ayub Khoso, and Rasheed Naz. The series revolves around terrorism in Pakistan's tribal areas bordering Afghanistan and Pakistan Army's efforts to eliminate it. The title track of the series was performed by Rahat Fateh Ali Khan.

At the 9th Lux Style Awards, the series received five nominations, winning two, including Best TV Play - Terrestrial and Best Television Writer.

== Plot ==
The series highlights the struggle of Pakistan's army to curb terrorism in the tribal and northern areas of the country. The story revolves around some "unknown" terrorist agents who cause destruction by terrorist importations, which not only affects the peace of the region but also the human psyche and relationships.

== Cast ==
- Syed Jibran
- Nauman Ijaz
- Ayub Khoso
- Rasheed Naz
- Ayesha Khan
- Sara Chaudhary
- Erum Akhtar
- Adnan Shah Tipu
- Mubashira Khanam

== Soundtrack ==
The official soundtrack of the series "Khuda Zameen Se Gaya Nahin Hai" was performed by Rahat Fateh Ali Khan, with music composition by Sahir Ali Bagga and lyrics by Imran Raza.

== Production ==
The series has been shot in the areas of Jhelum, Islamabad, Bahawalpur, Rahim Yar Khan and North-West Frontier Province (now Khyber Pakhtunkhwa).

== Awards and nominations ==
Year	Award	Category	Recipient(s) / nominee(s)	Result	Ref.
2010	Lux Style Awards	Best Television Play - Terrestrial	Khuda Zameen Se Gaya Nahin Hai	Won	
2010	Lux Style Awards	Best Television Writer	Asghar Nadeem Syed	Won	
2010	Lux Style Awards	Best Television Director	Kashif Nisar	Nominated	
2010	Lux Style Awards	Best Television Actress - Terrestrial	Sara Chaudhary	Nominated	
2010	Lux Style Awards	Best Television Actor - Terrestrial	Ayub Khoso	Nominated	
