= Mr. Shamim =

- Title screen
- Genre: Teen sitcom
- Written by: mubahila rizvi, Ali and Atiq
- Directed by: Hassan Saqib
- Starring: Ahmad Ali Butt; Sherry Shah; Saboor Ali
- Opening theme: "Yeh Hai Mr Shamim"
- Country of origin: Pakistan
- Original language: Urdu
- No. of seasons: 2
- No. of episodes: 117

Production
- Producer: Coconut Production
- Running time: 15–20 minutes

Original release
- Network: Hum TV
- Release: 28 December 2014 – 5 November 2017

Mr. Shamim (Urdu: مسٹر شمیم) was a 2014 Pakistani teen sitcom drama series that aired on Hum TV on Sunday evenings. It stars Ahmad Ali Butt, Sherry Shah and Arisha Razi in lead roles.

== Plot ==
Each episode features a different scenario. Some episodes are about the small family of Mr. Shamim, whereas others include guest appearances of other characters.

== Cast ==
- Ahmad Ali Butt as Mr. James Shamim
- Sherry Shah as Shagufta
- Bashar as Muzammil
- Arisha Razi as Zainab
- Saboor Ali as Rosie
- Mani as Asghar

=== Guest appearances ===
- Zuhab Khan as Zaim
- Mariyam Khalif as Tooba
- Pari Hashmi as Doctor
- Saman Ansari as Muzzamil's Teacher
- Ayesha Omar as Sidra Niazi
- Sanam Saeed as Maya
- Hira Mani as herself
- Benita David as Ayesha
