= PTV National =

Pakistani television channel

PTV National HD (Pakistan) Regional Language
- PTV National logo
- Country: Pakistan
- Headquarters: Islamabad, Pakistan

Programming
- Languages: Urdu; Punjabi; Sindhi; Pashto; Balochi; Brahui; Saraiki; Hindko.
- Picture format: 1080p 16:9 MPEG-4, HDTV

Ownership
- Owner: Pakistan Television Corporation
- Sister channels: AJK TV; PTV Bolan; PTV Global; PTV Home HD; PTV News HD; PTV Sports HD; PTV World

History
- Launched: August 29, 2004; 21 years ago

Links
- Website: PTV National

PTV National HD is a Pakistani free-to-air television channel owned by the Pakistan Television Corporation. It mainly broadcasts in regional languages of Pakistan.

== History ==
The channel was launched in 2004. In 2010, it was suffering from a lack of staff and budget.

== Programming ==
- Sports broadcast behalf of PTV Sports HD.
- Morning @ Ptv National (Sindhi Morning Show)
- Saday Nall (Punjabi Show)
- Aj Da Mehman (Punjabi Show)
