= Pakistan TV =

Pakistani international news channel

- Country: Pakistan
- Broadcast area: Africa; Asia; Europe; Middle East; North America; Oceania; South America
- Network: Pakistan Television Corporation
- Headquarters: Islamabad, Pakistan

Programming
- Language: English
- Picture format: 1080p 16:9, HDTV, MPEG-4

Ownership
- Owner: Government of Pakistan
- Sister channels: AJK TV SD; PTV Bolan SD; PTV Global SD; PTV Home HD; PTV National HD; PTV News HD; PTV Sports HD

History
- Launched: 16 September 2025; 11 months ago
- Replaced: PTV-2
- Closed: 2007-2013
- Former names: PTV-2 (1992–1998); PTV World (1998–2007); PTV World (2013–2025)

Links
- Website: pakistantv.com

Availability

Streaming media
- Live Streaming: Watch Live

Pakistan TV, formerly PTV World, is a 24-hour Pakistani English-language international news channel. It is a state-owned channel as a part of Pakistan Television Corporation. The service is also aimed at the overseas market and broadcast through satellite and online platforms similar to BBC World News, Arirang TV, TRT World, Deutsche Welle, ANC, France 24, CGTN, VOA, NHK World-Japan, and RT.

== History ==
PTV World was launched in 1992 as Pakistan's first satellite TV channel "PTV-2" with Japanese technical assistance, leasing a transponder on the AsiaSat-1 satellite. It became first in South Asia and among the pioneers of satellite service in Asia. Its name was changed to PTV World in 1998. The goal of this rebrand was to reach out to Pakistani immigrants in the rest of Asia, while a separate service for Europe (Prime TV) was set up. In 2007, PTV World was replaced by PTV News but was re-inaugurated on 29 January 2013 as an English-language news TV channel.

It was renamed to Pakistan TV and was relaunched on 17 September 2025. Pakistan TV Digital is a separate entity from Pakistan TV as it has its own newsroom, editor-in-chief and its own structure. Pakistan TV operates under the management of PTV Headquarters, Islamabad.

== See also ==
- List of television channels in Pakistan
- List of news channels in Pakistan
- Television in Pakistan
- Discover Pakistan TV
