= Dhai Chaal =

- Poster
- Directed by: Taimoor Sherazi
- Written by: Farheen Choudhry
- Produced by: Irfan Ashraf
- Starring: Shamoon Abbasi; Ayesha Omer; Humayoun Ashraf; Adnan Shah Tipu; Hareem Farooq
- Production company: Faisal Production
- Release date: 8 December 2023
- Country: Pakistan
- Language: Urdu

Dhai Chaal is a Pakistani film, directed by Taimoor Sherazi and produced by Irfan Ashraf. It was written by Farheen Choudhry and stars Shamoon Abbasi, Ayesha Omer, Humayoun Ashraf, and Adnan Shah Tipu. The film revolves around Balochistan and the struggles faced by its local population to keep peace and harmony. The film was released on 8 December 2023.

== Cast ==
- Shamoon Abbasi
- Ayesha Omer as Kanwal
- Humayoun Ashraf
- Adnan Shah Tipu
- Rasheed Naz
- Saleem Mairaj
- Taqi Ahmed

== Production ==
=== Casting ===
Saba Qamar was initially reported to star in the film. However, she denied this. Shamoon Abbasi revealed, "I'm playing the part of Kulbhushan Jadhav, the RAW agent from India, who was arrested by Pakistani authorities in March, 2016." Ayesha Omer revealed that she would portray a journalist in the film.

=== Filming ===
A large part of the film was shot in Quetta, Pakistan.

== Release ==
The film was released on 8 December 2023.

== Reception ==
Muhammad Suhayb of Youlin Magazine, heavily criticized Dhai Chaal, citing poor direction, weak editing, and a flawed script. He noted that despite a talented cast, the film failed to effectively handle its geopolitical themes or deliver a compelling narrative. Mohammad Kamran Jawaid of Dawn, heavily panned Dhai Chaal as a poorly made spy film, criticizing its excessive runtime, weak technical execution, and disjointed narrative. Though noting minor praise for actors Shamoon Abbasi, Saleem Mairaj, and Humayoun Ashraf, he described the film as a major failure in storytelling and direction.
