= PTV Global =

Pakistani television cable channel

PTV Global HD
- Country: Pakistan
- Network: Pakistan Television Corporation
- Headquarters: Islamabad, Pakistan

Programming
- Picture format: 1080i 16:9, MPEG-4, HDTV

Ownership
- Owner: Government of Pakistan
- Sister channels: PTV News; PTV Sports; PTV National; PTV Bolan; PTV Home; AJK TV; Pakistan TV

History
- Launched: 6 April 2006; 20 years ago

PTV Global is a Pakistani basic cable and satellite television channel by Pakistan Television Corporation that is aired nationwide as well as in Europe and the United States.

It broadcasts selected programming from PTV Home, PTV National, PTV News and other PTV-run networks. On air since April 2006, PTV Global is available via Dish Network in the US. Part of the Pakistan Television Corporation brand name, it is under control of the Government of Pakistan. It was formerly available in the United Kingdom where it was free-to-air on Sky Channel 735 until 2023 and also in Mainland Europe on Astra 2G until 2024.

== PTV in the UK ==
PTV Global was launched on Sky Channel 831 in 2007. It started its transmissions on 2 April 2007. It was later delisted from Sky on 17 July 2023, and removed from the Astra 2G satellite entirely in September 2024.

== PTV in USA ==
PTV Global was launched in 2006. It is one of the nine channels of the PTV Network. It started its transmission for the United States on 22 April 2006.

PTV Global beams its transmission from Islamabad, Pakistan on AsiaSat-35, and is viewed in over 50 countries worldwide, covering the continents of Asia, Africa, Europe, America and Australia. PTV Global is available exclusively in the US on the Dish Network. PTV is the most watched television network in Pakistan.

PTV-Global covers news and current affairs programming, including all facets of national politics, economy, current affairs, regional and international news, with a focus on the culture, art and music of Pakistan.

== See also ==
- PTV
- Government of Pakistan
- List of Pakistani television stations
