= Pinjra (2017 TV series) =

2017 Pakistani television series

- Written by: Imran Nazir
- Directed by: Kashif Nisar
- Starring: See the section on cast below
- Music by: Rahat Fateh Ali Khan
- Opening theme: "Ishqaaway" by Rahat Fateh Ali Khan
- Country of origin: Pakistan
- Original language: Urdu
- No. of seasons: 1
- No. of episodes: 27

Production
- Producer: A-Plus Entertainment
- Running time: Approx. 35–40 minutes
- Production company: 26th Frame Entertainment

Original release
- Network: A-Plus TV
- Release: 25 January – 2 August 2017

Pinjra (Urdu: پنجرا, lit. 'Cage') is an Urdu language Pakistani television series directed by Kashif Nisar and written by Imran Nazir. First broadcast in Pakistan by A-Plus TV, it features actors Yumna Zaidi, Noman Ijaz, Kiran Haq, Samina Ahmed, Hassan Ahmed, Farah Tufail and Faiza Gillani. Premiering on 25 January 2017, Pinjra ended its run on 2 August 2017 after telecasting 27 episodes.

== Cast ==
- Yumna Zaidi as Aasiya, Vanni of Jahanzaib Mazari
- Noman Ijaz as Aurengzeb (Ranga) Mazari
- Kiran Haq as Zulaikha, wife of Jahanzaib Mazari
- Hassan Niazi as Jahanzaib Mazari
- Samina Ahmad as Jannat Bibi
- Daniyal Raheel as Shahzaib Mazari
- Azra Aftab as Nasreen
- Hassan Ahmed as Ch Mubashir
- Farah Tufail as Fareeda, sister of Jahanzaib Mazari
- Faiza Gillani as Sakina
- Sonia Nazir as Zubeida
- Umer Darr as Lala, Zulaikha's brother
- Agha Mustafa Hassan as Waqar

== Theme ==
The series is based on social and moral issues revolving around gender discrimination in the rural society, specifically related to the concept of Vani. The story tells the journey of Amtul Rafay, a young girl who is sold off by her family to compensate another family where her brother had killed her fiancé. Simultaneously it revolves around reality based issues with different characters within the same plot.

== Accolades ==
Year	Award	Category	Recipients	Result
2018	Lux Style Awards	Best Television Actor	Noman Ijaz	Nominated
