= Farz (TV series) =

Pakistani television series

- Written by: Amir Raza
- Directed by: Kashif Nisar, Roamer Khan
- Creative director: Roamer Khan
- Opening theme: Sara Raza Khan
- Composer: Sahir Ali Bagga
- Country of origin: Pakistan
- Original language: Urdu
- No. of episodes: 17

Production
- Running time: 40-45 minutes
- Production company: Sixth Sense Communication

Original release
- Network: PTV Home
- Release: 6 February – 10 July 2017

Farz (Urdu: فرض, lit. 'Duty') is a Pakistani television series first broadcast on PTV Home in 2017, directed by Kashif Nisar and Roamer Khan written by Amir Raza. The series stars Sonia Mishal as an honest young police officer in lead role, with Nauman Ejaz, Aamna Malick, Azra Aftab, Qavi Khan and Saleem Mairaj in supporting roles.

== Cast ==
- Sonia Mishal as Aliya
- Nauman Ijaz as Chief Malik
- Qavi Khan as Bhai Sahab
- Saleem Mairaj as Saleem
- Inayat Khan as Khurram
- Aamna Malick as Mehak
- Azra Aftab as Aliya's mother
- Kinza Malik as Mehak's mother
- Talha Chahour as Imran
- Iftikhar Iffi
- Umer Darr
