= Bhai (TV series) =

Pakistani drama serial

- بھائی
- Genre: Action; Drama; Love–hate relationship
- Based on: Inspiring Central Lahore Stories
- Written by: Afifa Mahmood
- Directed by: Shoaib Khan
- Starring: Noman Ijaz; Maha Warsi; Saboor Ali; Seemi Raheel; Salman Shahid; Affan Waheed; Maryam Noor; Qaiser Naqvi; Azra Aftab
- Theme music composer: Javed Bashir
- Opening theme: "Laggi Walay Tay Akh Nae O Londe" by Javed Bashir
- Composer: Javed Bashir
- Country of origin: Pakistan
- Original languages: Urdu; Punjabi
- No. of episodes: 36

Production
- Producer: Shoaib Khan
- Production locations: Lahore, (Pakistan)
- Camera setup: Multi-Camera
- Running time: 35-40 minutes

Original release
- Network: A-Plus Entertainment
- Release: 31 January 2016 – 2017

Bhai (بھائی) is a Pakistani Urdu-language drama serial. It was aired by A-Plus Entertainment. It features Nauman Ijaz as a headstrong councillor of the mahallah who is a troublemaker for everyone be it in the house or outside, with Affan Waheed and Maha Warsi in leading roles.

== Plot ==
The story revolves around the dominance of man in eastern culture. A man with power is destroying the life of his innocent siblings' relations and when falls himself in love, considers love as legal.

== Cast ==
- Noman Ijaz as Ashraf “Bhai”; the arrogant, dominated protagonist and Hammad's elder brother
- Affan Waheed as Hammad; Ashraf's younger brother
- Maha Warsi as Ifrah; a teacher lives in the neighborhood of Ashraf and Hammad's love interest
- Saboor Aly as Sairah; Ashraf and Hammad's younger sister
- Seemi Raheel as Shakeela; Ashraf and Hammad's mother
- Salman Shahid as Muneer; Ashraf and Hammad's father
- Qaiser Naqvi
- Maryam Noor as Hira
- Azra Aftab
- Kinza Malik as Sajida
- Adnan Shah Tipu
- Munazzah Arif as Sabiha
