= Jinnah Ke Naam =

- Genre: Drama
- Written by: Kashif Nisar
- Directed by: Tariq Mairaj
- Starring: Saba Qamar; Sami Khan; Agha Ali; Ghazala Butt; Sherry Shah
- Country of origin: Pakistan
- Original language: Urdu
- No. of episodes: 13

Production
- Running time: ~45 minutes

Original release
- Network: PTV Home
- Release: 2009

Jinnah Ke Naam (Urdu: جناح کے نام, lit. 'To Jinnah'), also spelled as Jinnah Kay Naam, is a Pakistani romantic drama that was aired in 2009 on PTV Home. The drama stars Sami Khan and Saba Qamar in lead roles. The drama was directed by Tariq Mairaj. Jinnah Ke Naam is named after Muhammad Ali Jinnah, the founder of Pakistan.

== Cast ==
- Sami Khan as Muhammad Ahmed Ali
- Saba Qamar as Begum Rukhsana Inayatullah Khan
- Agha Ali as Ali
- Ghazala Butt as Nida
- Sherry Shah as Sania
- Maira Khan as Laila
- Syed Jibran as Abid Khan
- Ayub Khoso as Nawab Inayatullah Khan

== Awards ==
- Best TV Play (Terrestrial) – Nominated
- Best TV Actress (Terrestrial) – Saba Qamar – Nominated
- Best TV Actor (Terrestrial) – Sami Khan – Nominated
- Best TV Director – Tariq Mairaj – Nominated
- Best TV Writer – Kashif Nisar – Nominated
- Technical Excellence Creative Editing and Mixing – Kashif Rana – Nominated
- Best Cameraman Program – arrukh Lodhi – Nominated

== See also ==
- Pakistani dramas
- List of Pakistani dramas
