= Ghazala Butt =

Pakistani actress

- Born: 21 October 1960 (age 66); Rawalpindi, Pakistan
- Occupation: Actress
- Years active: 1989 – present
- Spouse: Hashim Butt (husband)
- Children: 3

Ghazala Butt is a Pakistani actress. She is known for her roles in dramas Kalmoohi, Rishton Ki Dor, Babban Khala Ki Betiyann, Zindaan, Ishq Zahe Naseeb, Tohmat and Naqab Zan.

== Personal life ==
Ghazala is married to actor Hashim Butt and they have three children.

== Filmography ==
=== Television ===
Year	Title	Role	Network
1989	Junoon	Rangga's mother	PTV
1990	Rawal Jugni	Mani Sado	PTV
1991	Guest House	Begum	PTV
1995	Ghar Chhota Sa	Samreen	PTV
2004	Aatish	Safia Begum	PTV
2004	Ajnabi Rastay Ajnabi Manzilen	Samreen	PTV
2007	Cousins	Zeeshan's mother	PTV
2008	Sipahi Maqbool Hussain	Nargis	PTV
2009	Kuda Zameen Se Gaya Nahin	Tasleem	PTV
2009	Jinnah Ke Naam	Nida	PTV
2010	Roger	Rusba	PTV
2011	Ek Umer Asar Hone Tak	Ghazal	PTV
2011	Muhalay Daar	Sajad's mother	PTV
2011	Anokha Ladla	Nazli	PTV
2012	Ghar	Ammara	PTV
2013	Kalmoohi	Shakeela	Geo TV
2015	Paiwand	Zeenat Begum	ARY Digital
2015	Paras	Shehryar's sister	Geo Entertainment
2015	Rishton Ki Dor	Sajida	Geo Entertainment
2016	Babul Ka Angna	Rubina	Geo Entertainment
2016	Joru Ka Ghulam	Uzma	Geo TV
2016	Waada	Jamila	ARY Digital
2017	Pujaran	Madiha's mother	TV One
2017	Zindaan	Amna	ARY Digital
2018	Mann Ke Dhagay	Humera	A Plus
2018	Aap Ko Kya Takleef Hai	Nurse Rajta	BOL Entertainment
2018	Tohmat	Rukhsana	Geo TV
2018	Babban Khala Ki Betiyann	Ruqaiya Phupo	ARY Digital
2019	Sipahi Maqbool Hussain Season 2	Nargis	TV One
2019	Gol Gappay	Sharmeli	BOL Entertainment
2019	Naqab Zan	Dua's aunt	Hum TV
2019	Ishq Zahe Naseeb	Gohar's aunt	Hum TV
2020	Mein Jeena Chahti Hoon	Suriya	Express Entertainment
2020	Tarap	Rabia's mother	Hum TV
2022	Ishq Nahin Aasan	Amir's grandmother	Aan TV
2023	101 Talaqain	Faiza's mother	Green Entertainment
2024	Nafrat	Saba's grandmother	Hum TV
2024	Rishtey	Saima	Aan TV
2024	Sultanat	Bilqees	Hum TV
2024	Woh Ziddi Si	Suraiya	Hum TV
2024	Ishq Beparwah	Majid's mother	Green Entertainment
2025	Malkani	Neelam	PTV
2025	Ism-e-Yaraan	Arifa	Hum TV
2025	Arsh	Sohaila	Express Entertainment
2026	Hadd		Hum TV
2026	Musafat	Zarina	Hum TV

=== Telefilm ===
Year	Title	Role
2004	Bazar	Rani
2024	Apna Pan	Hayat's mother
2024	Apna Ghar	Saad's mother

=== Film ===
Year	Title	Role
2006	Miki Kharo England	Azra Ni Khala
2007	Main Julian England	Azra Ni Khala
2018	Load Wedding	Anam
