= Sherry Shah =

Pakistani actress

- Born: Fehmida Shah; 5 May 1986 (age 40); Karachi, Pakistan
- Other name: Sherry
- Education: University of Karachi
- Occupations: Actress; Model; Singer; Producer; Director; Screenwriter
- Years active: 2000–present
- Spouse(s): Malik Anwar (m. 2013; div. 2014) Shamoon Abbasi (m. 2023)

Sherry Shah, also known as Sherry (born 5 May 1986) is a Pakistan actress, model and producer. She is known for her roles in dramas Mr. Shamim, Jinnah Ke Naam, Yeh Zindagi Hai and Meri Behan Meri Dewrani.

== Early life ==
Sherry was born on 5 May 1986 in Karachi, Pakistan. She completed her studies from University of Karachi.

== Career ==
She started modeling. She made her debut as an actress on PTV in 2000. She appeared in drama Wafa on PTV. She was noted for her roles in dramas Yeh Kaisi Mohabbat Hai, Wafa Hum Nibayen Gy, Chubhan, Sharbati, Mai Souteli, Mujhay Bhi Khuda Ne Banaya Hai, Haseena Moin Ki Kahani and Jaan Hatheli Par. She also appeared in drama Yeh Zindagi Hai and Yeh Zindagi Hai Season 2 as Pinki which was the longest-running television series. She has also appeared in telefilms. Since then she appeared in drama Mr. Shamim, Mr. Shamim Season 2 and Meri Behan Meri Dewrani. In 2019 she appeared in movie Durj as Laali.

== Personal life ==
Sherry married Dr. Malik Anwar in 2013 but got divorced a year later. In 2023, Sherry married fellow actor Shamoon Abbasi, with whom she had worked in the film Durj.

== Filmography ==
=== Television ===
Year	Title	Role	Network
2002	Singhar	Mimi	PTV
2007	Cousins	Maryam	PTV
2007	Sharbati	Sarbati	PTV
2008	Chubhan	Saba	PTV
2008	Yeh Zindagi Hai	Pinki	Geo Entertainment
2009	Sirf Aik Baar	Amber	TV One
2009	Wafa Hum Nibhaen Gy	Wafa	PTV
2009	Jinnah Ke Naam	Sabiha	PTV
2010	Subah Ho Gayi Mamu	Sherry	Geo TV
2011	Yeh Kaisi Mohabbat Ha	Gudia	Geo TV
2012	Meri Behan Meri Dewrani	Zobi	ARY Digital
2013	Yeh Zindagi Hai Season 2	Pinki	Geo Entertainment
2013	Jaan Hatheli Par	Kashifa	Urdu 1
2014	Mai Souteli	Asma	Urdu 1
2014	Mr. Shamim	Shagufta	Hum TV
2016	Mujhay Bhi Khuda Ne Banaya Hai	Arooj	A-Plus
2017	Mr. Shamim Season 2	Shagufta	Hum TV
2017	Haseena Moin Ki Kahani	Haseena	A-Plus
2017	Bewaqoofian	Rija	ARY Digital
2021	Rangeelay Hum	Durdana Chaudhry	SAB TV

=== Telefilm ===
Year	Title	Role
2009	Media Circus	Ramsha
2010	Bhoby Bhabi	Romana
2011	Hissay Ki Gai	Rani
2012	Lenay Ke Denay	Hina
2012	Teeja Party	Munni
2013	Mujhe Tum Say Mohabbat Hai	Rakhshanda
2014	Dil Mein Ho Tum	Faria
2015	Lalach Buri Balaa Hai	Shari
2016	Nawab Sahab Ki NauBahar	Aapi
2021	Chori Ka Laddu	Khubsoorat
2023	Mareez-e-Muhabbat	Naghmana

=== Web series ===
Year	Title	Role	Notes
2021	Naina	Naina	Shaam Films

=== Film ===
Year	Title	Role
2017	Mey Rahungi	Rabia
2019	Durj	Laali
2025	Mey Rahungi	Rabia

=== Music video ===
Year	Song	Singer(s)	Notes
2006	Ishq Bolay	Wasim Dar	Post Amazers
2006	Thumak Thumak	Tanveer Afridi	Dil Tere Naam

== Awards and nominations ==
Year	Award	Category	Result	Title	Ref.
2020	1st Pakistan International Screen Awards	Best Actress	Nominated	Durj	
