= Hijrat (film) =

2016 Pakistani romantic film by Farouq Mengal

- Teaser poster
- Directed by: Farooq Mengal
- Written by: Farooq Mengal
- Produced by: FM Productions
- Starring: Asad Zaman Khan; Rabia Butt; Noman Ejaz; Nadeem Baig; Salma Agha; Ayub Khoso; Azra Aftab; Zaib Rehman; Jamal Shah; Sana Nawaz
- Edited by: Asad Ali Zaidi & Amir kashmiri
- Music by: Sahir Ali Bagga
- Production company: FM Studios
- Distributed by: Hum Films; Eveready Pictures
- Release date: 22 April 2016 (Pakistan)
- Country: Pakistan
- Language: Urdu
- Box office: Rs. 0.60 crore (US$21,000)

Hijrat (Urdu: ہجرت, lit. 'Migration') is a 2016 Pakistani romantic film written and directed by Farouq Mengal and produced by FM Productions, and starring Asad Zaman Khan and Rabia Butt. The plot revolves around people affected by the Afghan War.

The film was distributed by Hum Films and Eveready Pictures, and released on 22 April 2016 in cinemas across Pakistan. Its premier held at The Place, Nuplex Cinema, Karachi, Pakistan. The film opened with average reviews from critics and was declared a flop at the box-office.

== Cast ==
- Asad Zaman Khan as Murad
- Rabia Butt as Jia (Protagonist)
- Nadeem Baig as Dr. Sameer
- Salma Agha as Feriha
- Durdana Butt as Nani
- Azra Aftab as Mehwish
- Ayub Khoso
- Rubab Ali as Mahi
- Momina Iqbal as Investigation officer
- Fahd Nur
- Zaib Rehman
- Jamal Shah
- Sana Nawaz (special appearance in song ''Chali Re Chali'')

== Filming ==
The first spell of the film was shot in Quetta, shooting continued in Europe in the spring of 2014 (Istanbul, Turkey) Some of the film-making equipment was imported from India. Mengal used all his mastery and filmed some of the best shots never practiced in Pakistani films. Exotic locations of Quetta, Nashukai and Istanbul can be seen. Hijrat was filmed on 35 mm Camera and equipment has shown its class.

== Music ==
The music has been composed by Sahir Ali Bagga and film will include songs by Ali Azmat, Rahat Fateh Ali Khan, Omer Nadeem, Sara Raza Khan, Imran Aziz, Abida Parveen, and Nandini Srikar. Nandini Srikar (an Indian singer) sang an item song (Chali Re Chali) for this movie.

== Release ==
=== Box office ===
The film failed to recover its budget, grossing only Rs. 6 million across cinemas in Pakistan over the course of one week. It ran for maximum two to three weeks in cinemas of Pakistan. In response to its theatrical failure, an official of Hum Films told The Express Tribune, ''We never expected it to do this badly in cinemas. It was always going to be tough but it is very hard to point out what exactly went wrong.''

== See also ==
- List of Pakistani films of 2016
