= Sipahi Maqbool Hussain =

Pakistani TV series

- The opening title screen for Sipahi Maqbool Hussain
- Created by: ISPR; Interflow Communications Limited
- Written by: Haider Imam Rizvi
- Directed by: Brigadier Syed Mujtaba Tirmizi
- Starring: Hassan Niazi; Raja Haider; Batin Farooqi; Riaz Mastana; Reeja; Ghazala Butt
- Country of origin: Pakistan
- No. of episodes: 6

Production
- Producer: Haider Imam Rizvi
- Running time: approx 40 min.

Original release
- Network: TV One, PTV
- Release: 20 April 2008

Sipahi Maqbool Hussain (Urdu: سپاہی مقبول حسین, lit. 'Private Maqbool Hussain') is a Pakistani television series, aired in April 2008 on TV One and Pakistan Television (PTV). The series was co-produced by Haider Imam Rizvi and Brig Syed Mujtaba Tirmizi from Inter Services Public Relations and Interflow Communications.

The miniseries narrates the true story of Maqbool Hussain, a Pakistani soldier injured and captured by the Indian Army during the Indo-Pakistani war of 1965. He spent 40 years in Indian jails before being released as a civilian prisoner in 2005. The series highlights the severe human rights abuses he endured and pays tribute to his resilience and steadfastness.

== Plot ==
As the story unfolds, Maqbool Hussain, bearing army No 335139, is shown being hit by enemy fire on the Line of Control at the start of the Indo-Pakistani war of 1965. Subsequently, he is taken prisoner by the Indian army, who deny him prisoner of war status he was entitled to under the international law of war, including the Geneva Conventions. Trained in the traditions of the Pakistan Army, Maqbool Hussain faces great suffering and refuses to share any information about his country with his captors – so much so that when they cut out his tongue, he writes Pakistan Zindabad (long live Pakistan) in his own blood. Maqbool Hussain was also beaten into becoming mentally ill during his four decades of incarceration.

== Cast ==
- Hassan Niazi
- Raja Haider
- Batin Farooqi
- Riaz Mastana
- Reeja
- Ghazala Butt

== Director's comments ==
Director Haider Imam Rizvi, who has dozens of popular television and movies and plays and serials to his credit, told the gathering he and his team had been reduced to tears several times during the filming of the poignant scenes in the drama serial. "In my opinion, the production of 'Sipahi Maqbool Hussain' is more significant than all the 40 serials that I have produced in my entire career," Rizvi said.

== Reception ==
Dawn lists the series among "Pakistant's top 10 patriotic dramas".

== See also ==
- ISPR Media Productions
