= Saat Mulaqatein =

Pakistani television show

- Genre: Web series
- Created by: Qaiser Ali
- Directed by: Kashif Nisar
- Starring: Noman Ejaz; Zara Tareen; Hamza Firdous
- Original language: Urdu
- No. of episodes: 9

Production
- Producers: Muhammad Rahimtoola; Qaiser Ali
- Production location: Lahore
- Production company: Nashpati Prime

Original release
- Network: Nashpati Prime
- Release: 28 November 2019

Saat Mulaqatein is a web series produced from Lahore. The project was directed by Kashif Nisar with cast line including Noman Ejaz and Zara Tareen. The series was first streamed during 2019 on Nashpati Prime.

The plot revolves around an intimate story of a couple in and out of marriage and love.

== Plot ==
Saat Mulaqatein is the story of a couple who have been married for 15 years and they decide to breaking up their relation on their 15th anniversary and after that, the story follows them throughout what happens when they both leave each other. The issues she faces in life, the circumstances he goes through. It's basically about mistrust, egos, and betrayal. They realized the things they were thinking huge were not as big and the involvement of egos and mistrust which causes them to broke off the marriage and because of that, the couple stays separated but somehow because they were married and had kids, life keeps bringing them back to cross each other's path over seven instances.

== Cast ==
- Noman Ejaz
- Zara Tareen
- Hamza Firdous as Narrator
