= PTV News =

Pakistani television news channel

PTV News HD
- PTV News logo used until 2021
- Country: Pakistan
- Broadcast area: Pakistan, Worldwide
- Headquarters: Islamabad, Pakistan

Programming
- Language: Urdu
- Picture format: 1080p (16:9, HDTV) MPEG-4

Ownership
- Owner: Pakistan Television Corporation
- Sister channels: AJK TV; PTV Bolan; PTV Global; PTV Home HD; PTV National HD; PTV Sports HD; PTV World

History
- Launched: August 14, 2007; 18 years ago
- Former names: PTV World

Links
- Website: ptv.com.pk/ptvNews

Availability

Terrestrial
- Analogue: UHF band

Streaming media
- Live Streaming: Watch Live

PTV News HD is a 24-hour Urdu News channel owned by the Pakistan Television Corporation. It also broadcast as Terrestrial television. PTV News is a cable and satellite news channel launched in the face of tough international competition. Its tagline is "Truth with Responsibility".

In May 2021, PTV News started broadcasting on YouTube, with high-definition streams launching in June 2021.

== Programmes ==
- Riaasat
- Capital View
- 10 Tak
- Shahrah e Dastoor
- 45 Minute
- Sochna Hoga
- Sach Kay Sath
- Aaj Ka Pakistan
- Khabar Ki Khabar
- Samaaj
- Dunya Kay 7
- Brunch Talk
- Subh e Pakistan
- Baat Karobar Ki
- Economy in Focus
- Qanoon Bolta Hai
- Sports 360
- Badal Raha Hai Pakistan
- Current Affairs Special
- KPK Diary
- Balochistan Hour
- Explore Kashmir
- Kashmir Magazine
- Kashmir Report
- Kabul Hour
- Cabinet Hour
- Parliament Roundup
- Meri Awaz
- Pak China Express
- Real Pakistani
- Khabarnama
- Sheh Surkhiyan
- Arabic News
- Shina News
- Balti News
- Kashmiri News
- Gojri News

== Viewpoint ==
PTV News has been accused of maintaining a positive bias toward the government and failing to cover opposition parties or to invite party representative to participate in its talk shows.

== See also ==
- PTV Home
- PTV National
- PTV Global
- List of Pakistani television stations
