= Meri Maa (Pakistani TV series) =

2013 Pakistani television serial

- Genre: Soap opera Family drama
- Written by: Kishore Asmal; Raheel Ahmed
- Directed by: Syed Wajahat Hussain; Furqan Adam
- Country of origin: Pakistan
- Original language: Urdu
- No. of seasons: 1
- No. of episodes: 257

Production
- Producer: A&B Productions
- Running time: approx. 18-47 Minutes

Original release
- Network: Geo Entertainment
- Release: August 22, 2013 – March 17, 2015

Meri Maa (Urdu: میری ماں; lit. 'My mother') is a Pakistani drama television series that aired on Geo TV from 22 August 2013 to 17 March 2015. The series was directed by Wajahat Hussain Gilani, written by Kishor Asmal and Raheel Ahmed, and produced by A&B Entertainment. The series is based on social and emotional issues of society.

== Synopsis ==
The drama theme revolves around the Sultan family, including Sultan's eldest son, Yousaf, and his wife, Fatima, and the younger Rehan and his wife, Nimra. Sultan has deep desire for a daughter. Rehan and Nirma have two sons. Yousaf and Fatima's second child is a daughter. It is the first girl in the Sultan household and becomes the center of love from every member of the family. Nirma got jealous that her sons are getting ignored due to a girl. The story takes a turn as the lives of the family members become shattered right after the birth of the girl.

== Cast ==
- Anum Fayyaz as Rameen Yousaf/ Rameen Danial (Female Lead)
- Suzain Fatima as Fatima Yousaf
- Madiha Rizvi as Nimra
- Kamran Gilani as Yousuf Hashmi
- Hammad Farooqui as Danial
- Anum Aqeel as Seema
- Pari Hashmi as Sajal Adnan
- Esha Noor as Erum
- Asad Siddiqui as Shan/Shani
- Imran Ashraf as Adnan
- Taqi Ahmed as Salman
- Ayaz Samoo as Shafqat
- Faizan Khawaja as Rehan
- Binita David as Rukhsana
- Hassan Ahmed as Naveed Shah
- Anwar Iqbal as Sultan
- Esha Butt
- Rashid Farooqui
