= PTV Sports =

Pakistani state-owned sports TV channel

PTV Sports HD
- Type: Sports
- Country: Pakistan
- Broadcast area: Pakistan; Central Asia; China; Hong Kong; Laos; Macau; Mongolia; Myanmar; South Asia; Western Asia; Middle East; North America; Africa
- Network: Pakistan Television Corporation
- Headquarters: Islamabad, Pakistan

Programming
- Languages: Urdu; English
- Picture format: 1080p, MPEG-4, 16:9, HDTV)

Ownership
- Owner: Government of Pakistan
- Sister channels: AJK TV SD; PTV Bolan SD; PTV Global SD; PTV Home HD; PTV News HD; PTV National HD; PTV World SD

History
- Launched: January 12, 2012; 14 years ago

PTV Sports HD is a 24-hour state-owned sports channel operated by the Pakistan Television Corporation (PTV).

PTV Sports was founded as a sports division of the PTV in the 1970s. It was licensed as a stand-alone sports channel in January 2012. It broadcasts cricket, football, hockey, snooker, and tennis events in Pakistan.

== History ==
Since becoming a PTV division in the 1970s, PTV Sports has faced multiple disputes over broadcast rights.

In 2003, a dispute occurred when the Pakistan Cricket Board (PCB) awarded the broadcasting rights for a Pakistan-New Zealand series to Geo TV via a competitive bidding process. PTV Sports challenged the process's fairness, leading to intervention by the Pakistan Electronic Media Regulatory Authority (PEMRA) which resulted in Geo TV being denied uplink permissions, and the first One Day International (ODI) in Lahore was not televised. This was the first incident since 2007 that an international cricket match of Pakistan national cricket team was not broadcast in Pakistan. The conflict was resolved when the President of Pakistan, also serving as PCB's patron-in-chief, facilitated a joint broadcast agreement for the subsequent matches.

PTV Sports has also faced challenges securing broadcast rights for cricket events due to financial constraints or limited commercial interest. Notably, PTV Sports did not broadcast the 2007 ICC World Twenty20, the 2009 Pakistan-Australia Test series, and the 2013 cricket series against Sri Lanka and South Africa, all hosted in the United Arab Emirates. The Senate Committee on Information and Broadcasting criticized these omissions. To address public access issues, the PCB now requires successful broadcasting rights bidders to share the feed with PTV at a set price.

On 11 January 2012, PTV Sports was licensed as a stand-alone satellite-based 24-hour sports channel.

== Broadcast rights ==
=== Asian Cricket Council tournaments (2025 to 2027) ===
PTV Sports acquired domestic television rights for all ACC events from 2025 to 2027, including the Men's Asia Cup (2025, 2027), Women's Asia Cup (2026), and the U19 & Emerging Asia Cup.

=== ICC events 2024 to 2025 ===
PTV, in partnership with Tower Sports, holds non-exclusive broadcast rights in Pakistan for multiple ICC global events, including the Men's T20 World Cup 2024, Women's T20 World Cup 2024, U19 Women's T20 World Cup 2025, Champions Trophy 2025, 2025 ICC World Test Championship Final, and the Women's Cricket World Cup 2025.

=== ICC events 2025 to 2027 ===
PTV Sports has secured the broadcasting rights for all upcoming ICC events in Pakistan until the end of the 2027 cycle. The tournaments include Men's T20 World Cup 2026, ICC World Test Championship Final 2027, Men's Cricket World Cup 2027, Women's T20 World Cup 2026, & T20 Champions Trophy 2027.

=== Pakistan Super League (PSL X, 2025) ===
PTV Sports shares media rights for the 2025 Pakistan Super League (season X), broadcasting matches in Urdu and English feeds alongside A Sports.

=== Pakistan Super League (PSL 11, 2026) ===
PTV Sports, Geo Super, and Ten Sports shares television media rights for the 2026 Pakistan Super League (season 11), broadcasting matches in Urdu and English feeds alongside A Sports.

== See also ==
- List of sports television channels
- Sport in Pakistan
- Grand Slam
- National Games of Pakistan
- List of cricket commentators
