= Dil Awaiz =

- Written by: Zafar Mairaj
- Directed by: Farooq Mengal
- Starring: Noman Ejaz; Sana Nawaz; Tauqeer Nasir; Azra Aftab; Saboor Ali Saba Faisal. Saboor Ali
- Opening theme: "Dil Awaiz" by Shabnam Majeed
- Composer: Chakko Lehri
- Country of origin: Pakistan
- Original language: Urdu

Production
- Executive producer: Akhtar Hussain
- Producer: Sikandar Baig
- Production locations: Karachi, Pakistan
- Editor: Syed Owais Alim Amir kashmiri
- Camera setup: Multi-camera setup

Original release
- Network: PTV Network
- Release: 2013 – 16 February 2014

Dil Awaiz is a 2013 Pakistani drama serial, directed by Farooq Mengal, written by Zafar Mairaj and produced by Sikandar Baig. It stars Sana Nawaz, Nauman Ejaz, Tauqeer Nasir, Azra Aftab, Saba Faisal and Fariha Jabeen in lead roles.

== Cast ==
- Nauman Ejaz
- Sana Fakhar
- Tauqeer Nasir
- Azra Aftab
- Saba Faisal
- Fareeha Jabeen
- Jahanzeb Gourchani
- Taqi Ahmed
- Sadia Ghafoor
- Saboor Ali

== Production ==
Principal photography for the series took place in Bedian road, Lahore; filming began in August 2012.

== Original soundtrack ==
The title song of the serial was composed by Chakko Lehri, while the lyrics were penned by Ayyub Khawar and sung by Shabnam Majeed.

== Awards ==
The series three nominations at the 13th Lux Style Awards.

- Best TV Play (Terrestrial) – Nominated
- Best TV Actor (Terrestrial) – Noman Ijaz – Nominated
- Best TV Actress (Terrestrial) – Sana Fakhar – Nominated
