= Jinnah Convention Centre =

Exhibition and convention centre based in Islamabad, Pakistan

- مرکز همایش جناح
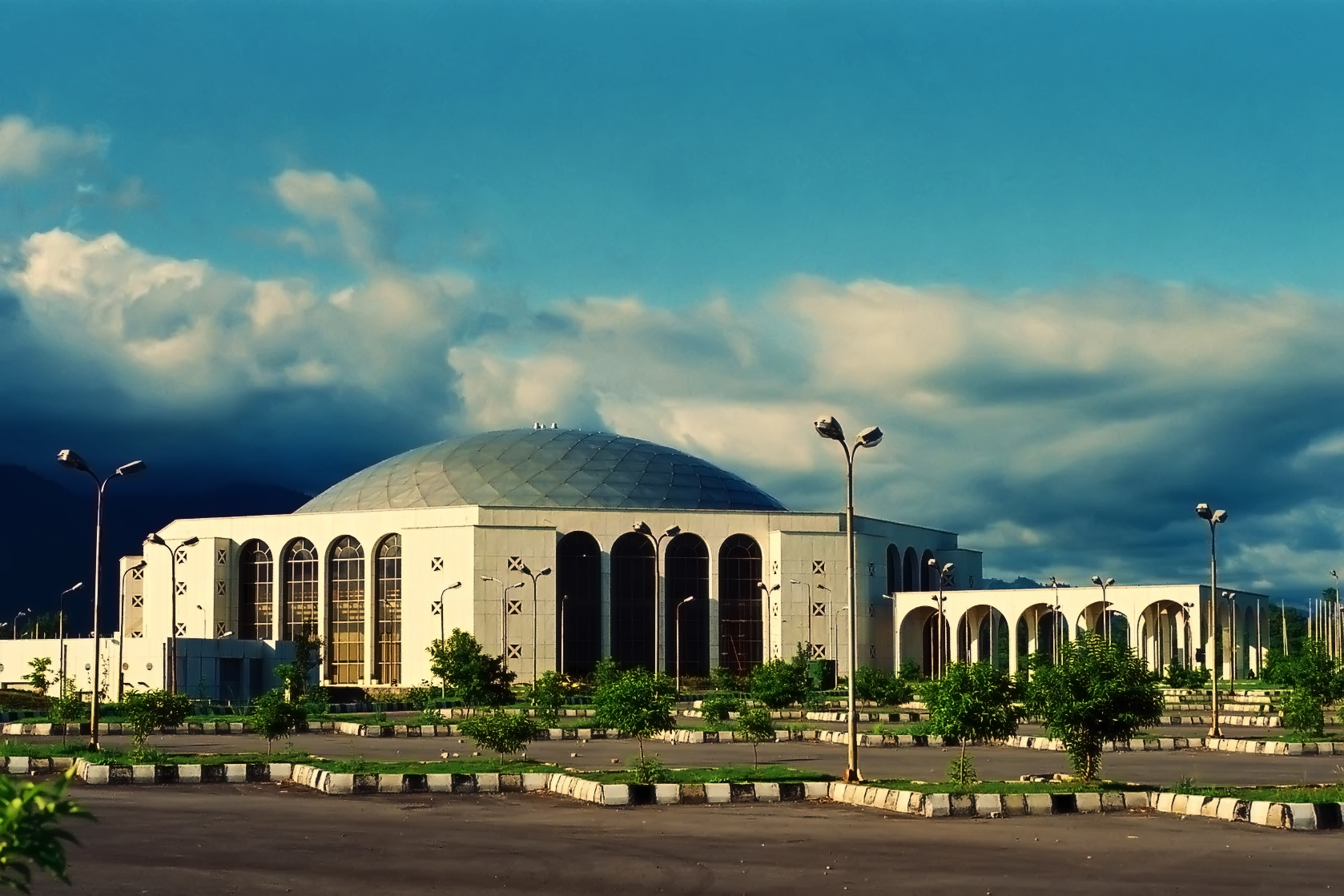
- Interactive map of Jinnah Convention Centre
- Address: Club Road; Islamabad; Pakistan
- Coordinates: 33.71340436998132°N 73.1054877957234°E
- Owner: Capital Development Authority
- Capacity: 2,200
- Type: Convention centre
- Parking: 1,000 spaces

Construction
- Opened: 1997

Website
- www.conventioncenter.pk

Jinnah Convention Centre (also known as National Convention Centre) is an exhibition and convention centre based in Islamabad, Pakistan. It is named after Muhammad Ali Jinnah.

Currently managed by the Capital Development Authority, it has a seating capacity of 2,200 people, and a parking facility of more than 1,000 cars spread over three parking lots.

It is mainly used by the Government of Pakistan to host national ceremonies, and by universities for convocations.

== History ==
The convention centre was inaugurated in 1997 to host the First Extraordinary Summit of OIC.

In April 2026, the convention centre was used to host the Islamabad Peace Talks.

== Privatization ==
In July 2020, the Cabinet Committee on Privatisation (CCoP) approved transaction structures for the privatization of Jinnah Convention Centre.

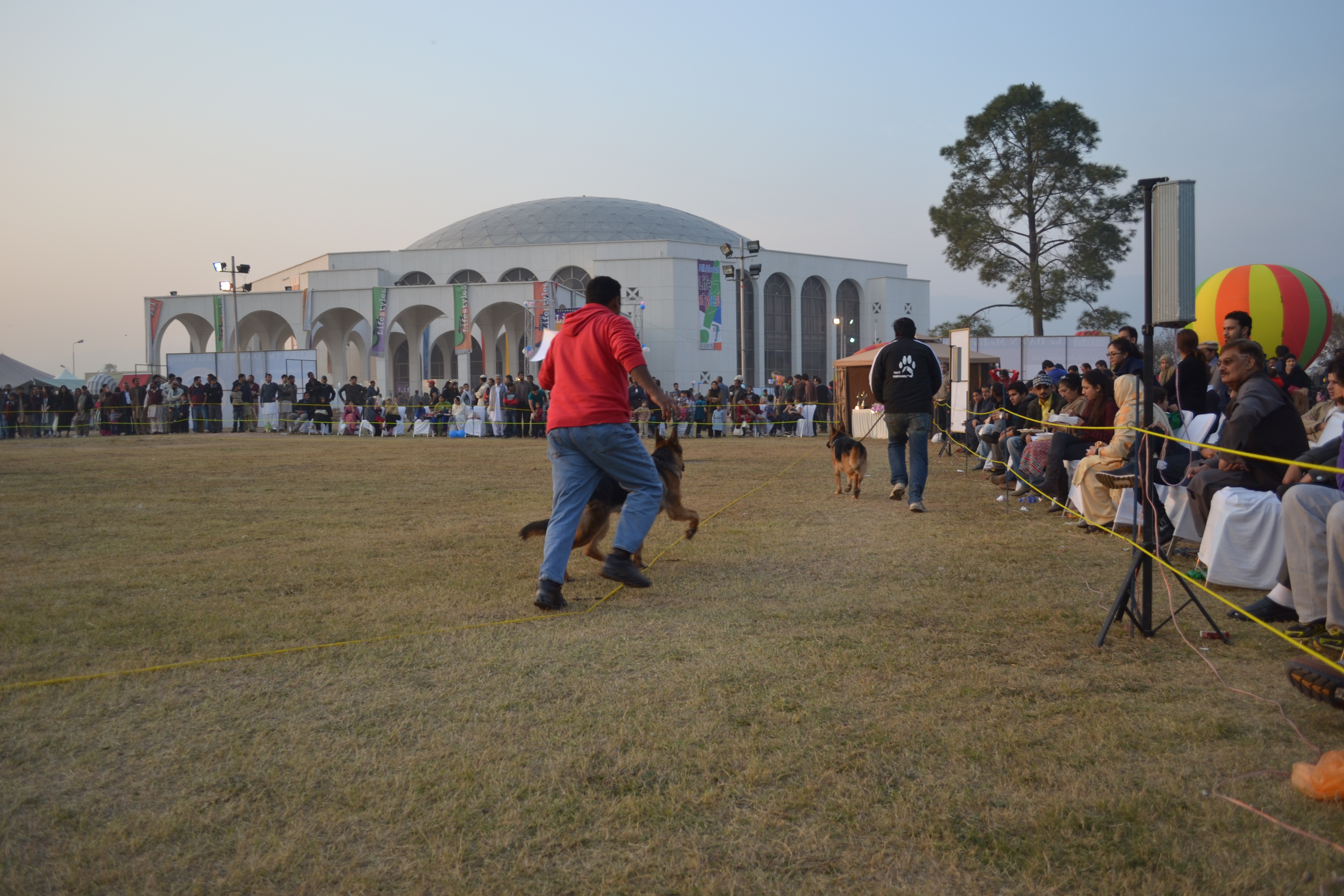
Islamabad Dog Show, Islamabad, Pakistan

== Exhibitions ==
These are the exhibitions and festivals held in convention centre.

- Annual Technical and Oil Show
- Education Expo
- HVACR
- PTV Awards
