= PTV Awards =

Pakistani television awards ceremony

PTV Official Awards پی ٹی وی ایوارڈز
- Current: 17th PTV Awards
- 17th PTV Awards logo
- Awarded for: Excellence in television, fashion, movie and music achievements
- Sponsored by: Different
- Date: June 11, 2012; 14 years ago
- Location: Jinnah Convention Centre, Islamabad, Expo Center Karachi
- Country: Pakistan
- Presented by: Pakistan Television Corporation
- Hosted by: PTV actors, PTV singers, PTV management
- First award: 1970
- Final award: 2013
- Website: ptv.com.pk/awards

Television/radio coverage
- Network: PTV Home
- Runtime: 150–200 min

PTV National Awards (پی ٹی وی ایوارڈز) was an awards ceremony annually held by the Pakistan Television Corporation. The awards were first introduced in the early 1980s to encourage talented people in Pakistan.

== History ==
The PTV awards is the largest awards ceremony in the country and is presented by the government of Pakistan's largest media group. The Pakistan Television Corporation established the PTV Awards in 1981 from Rawalpindi-Islamabad Headquarter. The awards were not famous in the beginning but became popular after the fifth PTV Awards ceremony. In the 2000s, the management of the corporation extended the awards to artists working on private TV channels. PTV has been the parent platform for most contemporary Pakistani actors and singers.

== Chief guest ==
The chief guest of the PTV Awards is usually the head of state or government like the Prime Minister, President or the Minister of Information and Broadcasting.

== Categories ==
Following is the list of awards.

Active categories
Type	Titles
Television	Best Actor Jury; Best Actor Viewers; Best Actress Jury; Best Actress Viewers; Best Producer Independent Play; Best Producer Drama Serial; Best Drama Director Series; Best Playwright Series; Best Playwright Independent Play; Best Supporting Actor; Best Supporting Actress; Best Anchor of the year; Best Producer Music Shows Event; Best Original Soundtrack; Best Special Transmission; Best Actor – Negative Role; Best Actress – Negative Role
Fashion	Best Model Female; Best Model Male
Music	Best Singer Light Music; Album of the Year
Film	Best Film of the Year
Highest Among All	Life Time Achievement; Pride of Performance; Tribute to Pakistani Legends

== Record of the awards ==
Following is the detailed table of awards presented so far.

Year	Ceremony	Academy in charge
1981	1st PTV Awards	PTV
1982	2nd PTV Awards	PTV
1983	3rd PTV Awards	PTV Academy
1984	4th PTV Awards	PTV Academy
1985	5th PTV Awards	PTV Academy
1986	6th PTV Awards	PTV Academy
1987	7th PTV Awards	PTV Academy
1988	8th PTV Awards	PTV Academy
1989	9th PTV Awards	PTV Academy
1998	10th PTV Awards	PTV Academy
1999	11th PTV Awards	PTV Academy
2003	12th PTV Awards	PTV Academy
2006	13th PTV Awards	PTV Academy
2009	14th PTV Awards	PTV Academy
2010	15th PTV Awards	PTV Academy
2011	16th PTV Awards	PTV Academy
2012	17th PTV Awards	PTV Academy
2013	18th PTV Awards	PTV Academy

== See also ==
- List of Asian television awards
