= Rahim Shah =

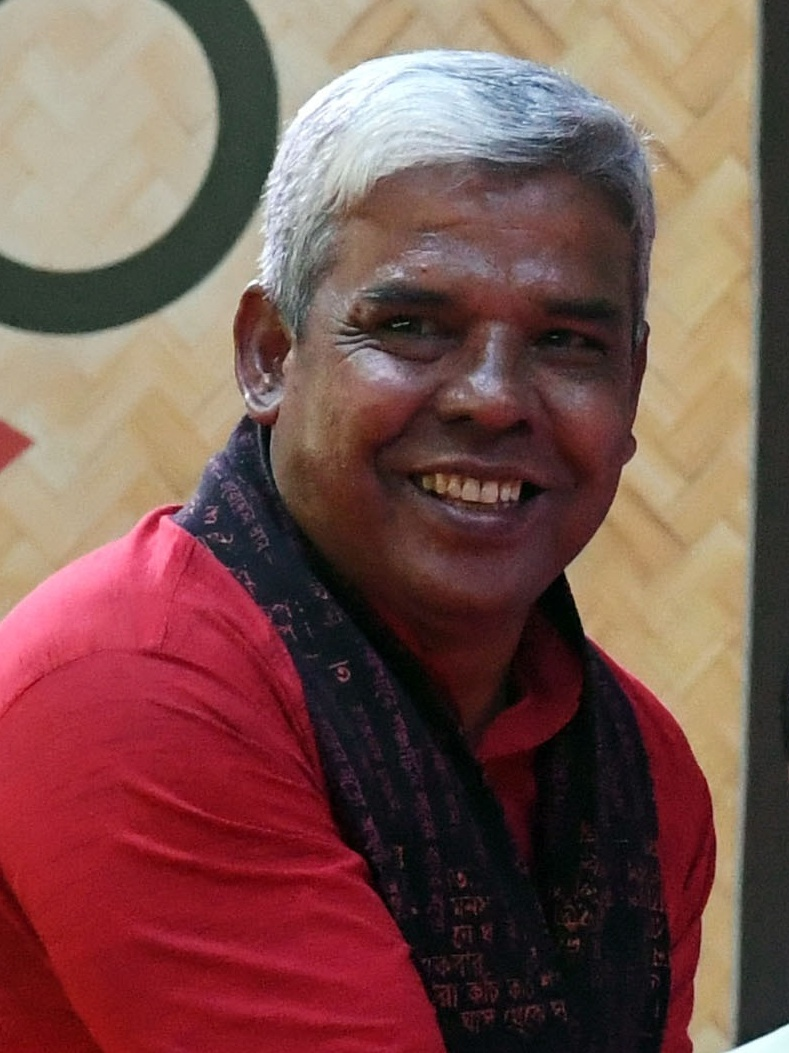
- Rahim Shah
- Born: 3 October 1959 (age 67); Chittagong, Bangladesh
- Education: University of Chittagong
- Occupation: Children's writer
- Writing career
- Language: Bengali
- Notable awards: Bangla Academy Literary Award

Rahim Shah (born 3 October 1959) is a Bangladeshi children's writer and rhymester. He received the Bangla Academy Literary Award in 2019.

== Early life and education ==
Rahim Shah was born on 3 October 1959 in West Bakalia, Chittagong. He is the fifth child of K. M. Abdus Shukur and Syeda Rizia Begum of Chandanaish Upazila, Chittagong. He completed his primary education from West Bakalia Government Primary School in 1969. He passed his SSC from Bakalia Government High School and HSC from Haji Muhammad Mohsin College. In 1987, he completed his bachelor's degree under the University of Chittagong.

== Career ==
He served as the Executive Director of the environmental NGO Shapla Doel Foundation and Vice President of NCC (Nature Conservation Committee). Primarily a writer of children's literature, he began writing in 1970. He has been a regular contributor to several national newspapers in Bangladesh.

He started his journalism career with Dainik Naya Bangla in 1981. He worked at Bangladesh Shishu Academy from 1989 to 2003. Later, he worked with Dainik Prabhat, Dainik Sokaler Khobor, and bdnews24.com. Currently, he serves as a consultant at a publishing house.

== Literary works ==
=== Stories and novels ===
- Agun Danar Pakhi (1994)
- Char Khanjanar Golpo (2000)
- Doel (2003)
- Buno Hasher Abhijan (2006)
- Dattyi O Jelebou (2007)
- Adventure Himchari (2007)
- Baccha Hatir Kando (2009)
- Chumki O Tar Bondhura (2010)
- Khuki O Kathberali (2013)
- Voyonkor 3 Adventure (2018)
- Aporup Golpo (2021)
- Love for Mother (2021)
- Meen Kumar (2021)
- Adventure of Wild Duck (2021)
- Bismoyer Ek Rat (2021)
- Brishti Hok (2021)
- Megher Chhaya (2021)
- Pingkir Adventure (2017)

=== Translations and fairy tales ===
- Onnorokom Rajkumari (2000)
- Agami Diner Rohossho (2002)
- Tom's Adventure (2004)
- The Fisherman and the Golden Fish (2007)
- Princess Cinderella (2008)
- Pippi Goes on Adventure (2010)
- Alice in Wonderland (2012)
- Russian Fairy Tales (2013)

=== Poetry and rhymes ===
- Lorai Lagar Ghonta (1986)
- Dudh Makha Bhat Kake Khay (1988)
- Rater Kopale Jonakir Tip (1994)
- Anondo Re Anondo (2009)
- Uroche Chhora Pakhir Danay (2011)
- Chotoder Kobita (2020)
- Birkonnar Chhora (2021)

=== Biography ===
- Chotoder Mohammad Nasiruddin (1995)
- Galileo (2021)

=== Science ===
- Bangladesher Pakhi O Bonno Poribesh (2003)
- Manush Korlo Akash Joy (2004)
- Mojaar Jana Jyotirbidya (2008)
- Ghure Ashi Mohabishwe (2019)

=== Edited works ===
- Bangabandhuke Niye 101 Kishor Rochona (2011)
- Godye-Podye Sheikh Mujib (2013)
- Shoto Lekhay Bangabandhu (2021)

== Awards ==
- Bangla Academy Literary Award (2019)
- Atish Dipankar Gold Medal (2003)
- Jasimuddin Memorial Award (2005)
- Abu Zafar Obaidullah Award (2008)
- Jibanananda Das Memorial Medal (2020)
