= PTV Home =

Pakistani television entertainment channel

PTV Home HD (Pakistan)
- Country: (Pakistan)
- Broadcast area: Pakistan
- Headquarters: Islamabad, Pakistan

Programming
- Language: Urdu
- Picture format: (1080p (16:9, MPEG-4 HDTV)

Ownership
- Owner: Pakistan Television Corporation
- Sister channels: AJK TV; PTV Bolan; PTV Global; PTV National HD; PTV News HD; PTV Sports HD; PTV World

History
- Launched: 26 November 1964; 61 years ago

Links
- Website: ptv.com.pk/ptvHome

Availability

Terrestrial
- Analogue: VHF band

Streaming media
- Live Streaming: Watch Live

PTV Home HD is a Pakistani free-to-air television channel owned by the Pakistan Television Corporation. It also broadcast as a terrestrial television.

== History ==
PTV Home started broadcasting on 26 November 1964 in West Pakistan and on 25 December 1964 in East Pakistan (now Bangladesh).

The broadcasts were limited to Lahore and Dacca at first, before extending to Rawalpindi and Islamabad in 1965 and Karachi in 1966. The Lahore station moved from channel 9 to channel 5 in November 1968, increasing its power. The basic PTV network was completed in 1974, after the start of the microwave network in 1973, and ahead of the start of color broadcasts in 1975.

Table of PTV transmitters in 1977
Location	Channel	ERP	Launch
Islamabad/Rawalpindi	6	25KW	1967
Karachi	4	36KW	December 1966
Lahore	5	50KW	25 December 1964
Murree	8	10KW	March 1969
Thana Bulla Khan	9	10KW	June 1973
Sakesar	5	10KW	July 1973
Cherat	10	10KW	August 1973
Quetta	6	10KW	26 November 1974

Peshawar was able to create programming and had taping facilities, but used the Quetta transmitter.

In the 90s, the channel was renamed PTV 1 and by 2000 was broadcasting 18 hours a day. The content of the schedule varied for terrestrial and satellite viewers. From 14 August 2007, PTV One was renamed PTV Home and PTV 2 was renamed PTV News.
