= Deewangi =

Pakistani television series

- Official title card
- دیوانگی
- Genre: Romance; Tragedy; Obsession
- Written by: Sadia Akhtar
- Directed by: Zeeshan Ahmed
- Starring: Danish Taimoor; Hiba Bukhari
- Country of origin: Pakistan
- Original language: Urdu
- No. of seasons: 1
- No. of episodes: 41

Production
- Producers: Abdullah Kadwani; Asad Qureshi
- Production locations: Karachi; Lahore
- Camera setup: Multi-camera setup
- Running time: 37 minutes
- Production company: 7th Sky Entertainment

Original release
- Network: Geo Entertainment
- Release: 18 December 2019 – 26 August 2020

Related
- Jaan Nisar

Deewangi (Urdu: دیوانگی, lit. 'Madness') is a Pakistani romantic drama television series, produced by Abdullah Kadwani and Asad Qureshi under 7th Sky Entertainment. It has Danish Taimoor and Hiba Bukhari in their second project together after Haara Dil (2018).

The sequel for the series Jaan Nisar (also known as Deewangi 2) premiered on 11 May 2024 on the same network.

Despite Ban in India and Gulf Countries, the drama achieved Blockbuster viewership on YouTube. The drama has generated over 2.387 billion views on YouTube. In terms of ratings, the drama opened with 10.4 TRP, achieved highest TRP of 18.8 and ended with 15.5 TRP. It also hit Peak ratings of 25.4. The last episode would have fetched TRP of more than 20+ but there was no light in Pakistan in most of the Pakistan cities when the last episode aired .

== Plot ==
The story revolves around Nageen Fayaz (Hiba Bukhari), who hails from a lower-middle-class background, and Sultan Durrani (Danish Taimoor), a wealthy businessman who hails from a political background. Sultan lost his parents at a very young age and has lived with his grandmother Fazeelat (Ismat Zaidi) ever since. After the death of her mother and remarriage of her father, Nageen lives with her sister Nuzhat (Faiza Gillani), brother-in-law Rashid (Noor-ul-Hassan), their two children and Rashid's mother. Nageen lands only menial jobs because she does not have a degree, and is hired as a bus hostess at a private bus company.

Sultan crosses paths with Nageen when his car suddenly stops working on the highway and has no other choice but to travel in a bus. In that brief journey, Sultan is drawn to Nageen when he sees her confronting a harasser. Afterwards, he starts travelling by bus every now and then just to meet Nageen but she ignores him and only treats him as a passenger. To seek her attention, Sultan buys all the bus tickets one day to travel alone with Nageen. He expresses his feelings for her but she rejects him because of their class difference. She gets more frightened after a man throws acid on Faryal (Nageen's friend) for refusing his proposal. On the other hand, Sultan has a cousin, Narmeen (Zoya Nasir), who is the daughter of his uncle, Muzaddid, wants to marry Sultan. She finds out about Nageen and makes a plan to trap her. After a few days, Sultan forcefully tries to put a ring on Nageen's fingers but she refuses and slaps him. Narmeen's secret agent records a video and it goes viral on social media. The video makes Sultan look like a harasser and as a result, Muzaddid loses the general public elections. Nageen reaches out to Sultan for his forgiveness and he accepts her apology. Sultan again proposes to Nageen and she accepts it this time. Nageen's family is very happy with the marriage, but most members of Sultan's family oppose it as they want him to marry Narmeen. On the wedding day, Nageen is kidnapped and everyone suspects her of running away with someone else. Her father Fayaz and his wife rebuke Nuzhat for all this. Sultan calls off the wedding and Nageen's character is questioned in society.

Nageen is let go after two days. Her family believes that she has either been raped or ran away on her own. Nageen tries to assure them that nothing bad happened to her, nor did she run away. She has no explanation to give concerning the two-day kidnapping. After a few days, Nageen goes to Sultan to make him believe in her innocence, but Sultan reveals that he was the one who kidnapped her and that the marriage was just a plan to seek revenge from Nageen for the slap and the public humiliation. Nageen is heartbroken. She threatens to expose Sultan in front of the media but Sultan blackmails Nageen with photoshopped intimate pictures. He also pays Rashid five million rupees to keep their mouths shut.

Sultan marries Narmeen on Fazeelat's insistence. Rashid forcefully arranges Nageen's marriage with Anwar but Nageen plans to runaway with the help of her sister. One day, Anwar comes to Nageen's house when she is alone and tries to rape her so Nageen, out of self-defense, grabs the first hard thing she sees, hits him on the head, and escapes. Nageen goes to Lahore to her Aunt's house. On the way, Nageen meets Haroon Malik (Ali Abbas) who tries to become her friend but she turns him down. Haroon helps Nageen a lot in Lahore. Nageen lands a job as a Receptionist in a TV Channel company. She finds out that Haroon also works as a reporter in the same company. They become friends and Haroon starts liking Nageen. Sultan leads an unhappy married life with Narmeen and missed Nageen constantly but tries to deny his feelings. In Lahore, Haroon proposes Nageen but she is reluctant as Haroon's mother doesn't approve of the match. However, Nageen and Haroon manage to get married anyway. On the other hand, Sultan begins his search for Nageen. One day, Sultan finds out about Narmeen's conspiracies and in a fit of rage, he throws Narmeen out of the house. However, Narmeen hits a wall and dies after giving birth to their daughter. Sultan and Fazeelat hide it from everyone but she is angry at Sultan and doesn't let him meet his daughter. Eventually Muzaddid gets to know about it. He tries to shoot Sultan, but accidentally shoots Fazeelat and she dies. Narmeen's parents cut all ties with Sultan and doesn't allow him to meet his daughter Rameen. Thus Sultan loses all his loved ones and temporarily shifts to UK. Where as Muzaddid become paralysed and dies.

Four years pass by. Nageen leads a happy married life with Haroon although they have financial issues, they also have trouble while having a baby and Haroon's mother constantly taunts Nageen. Sultan returns to Pakistan and tries to meet Rameen, but Narmeen's mother Sharmeen doesn't allow him and she moves to Canada permanently with Rameen. Sultan launches a media channel and joins politics Sultan still loves Nageen and wants to get her back. One day, he sees Nageen and again becomes obsessed with her.

Sultan started stalking Nageen and in order to get closer to her, appoints Haroon in his media company. Sultan provided a furnished house to Haroon's family in Karachi so that they can shift to Karachi and he can get close to Nageen more often. Soon, Nageen gets pregnant and her family is overjoyed. Sultan strengthen his ties with Haroon's family but Nageen keeps on trying to avoid him. After realizing that all his efforts are useless, Sultan hired Haroon's ex girlfriend, Ramsha Ahmed in his company and conspires with her to make hurdles in Nageen's life. Ramsha who regrets leaving Haroon after her failed marriage wants him back now. She got close to Haroon and started manipulating him against Nageen. Ramsha was also suspicious about the obsession of Sultan with Nageen, after digging in Nageen's past she gets to know the affair of Sultan and Nageen. She starts blackmailing Sultan that she will reveal what he did to Nageen in the media if he didn't helped her getting back with Haroon. They partnered up to separate Haroon and Nageen. Ramsha tells half truth about Nageen's past to Haroon to separate them but he doesn't believes her. Then he overhears Nageen and Nuzhat conversation about the same and got angry on Nageen. Due to stress, she fainted and is hospitalised. Sultan bribes doctor to abort Nageen's baby and call it a miscarriage. Later, Nageen tried to save his marriage by telling Haroon truth about her past with Sultan. Haroon in fit of rage confront Sultan and try to hit him but his servants attacked Haroon and made his injuries look like an accident. But Ramsha and Naheen know it is done by Sultan. Ramsha realizes that Sultan is dangerous and selfish person so she partnered with Nageen in order to punish Sultan legally. However, Ramsha ended up committing suicide. Nageen claimed that Ramsha is murdered by Sultan but cops said she died by shooting herself.

In order to expose Sultan, Nageen told Sultan that Haroon had divorced her. She agreed to marry him and ask Sultan to provide money for treatment of Haroon. He sends money for Haroon's treatment. After few months, Sultan wins election and prepares to marry Nageen. However, during nikah Nageen neglect to marry Sultan and exposes him front of media, infuriating Sultan. He took Nageen to his home where during an argument Nageen shot him. Haroon, now recovered, reached there at the moment and took the blame of shooting Sultan and was locked up by cops. Sultan was taken to hospital, where he asked cops to release Haroon and that he has shot himself. Hajra accept Nageen as her daughter-in-law. Nageen and Haroon ended up together while Sultan dying in the hospital.

== Cast ==
=== Main ===
- Danish Taimoor as Sultan Durrani: Narmeen's widower; Nageen's ex-lover; Rameen's father (Dead)
- Hiba Bukhari as Nageen Fayaz: Nuzhat's sister; Fayaz's daughter; Haroon's wife; Sultan's ex-lover

=== Recurring ===
- Ali Abbas as Haroon Malik: Shahid and Hajra's son; Rida's brother; Ramsha's ex lover; Nageen's husband
- Zoya Nasir as Narmeen Durrani : Muzaddid and Sharmeen's daughter; Sultan's wife; Rameen's mother (Dead)
- Ismat Zaidi as Fazeelat Durrani: Muzaddid's mother; Sultan and Narmeen's grandmother (Dead)
- Mehmood Aslam as Muzaddid Durrani: Narmeen's father; Sharmeen's husband (Dead)
- Nida Mumtaz as Sharmeen Durrani : Narmeen's mother; Muzaddid's wife
- Faiza Gillani as Nuzhat Fayaz: Nageen's sister; Fayaz's daughter; Rashid's wife
- Noor ul Hassan as Rashid Imam: Nuzhat's husband
- Parveen Akbar as Rashid's mother
- Humaira Bano as Hajra Shahid : Haroon and Rida's mother; Shahid's widow
- Aiza Awan as Rida Malik: Shahid and Hajra's daughter; Haroon's sister
- Ayat Arif as Rameen Durrani : Sultan and Narmeen's daughter
- Shazia Qaiser as Phuppho : Nageen and Nuzhat's aunt; Fayaz's sister; Rizwan's mother
- Shehzad Malik as Phuppha : Naveen and Nuzhat's uncle; Rizwan's father
- Anas Ali Imran as Fawad: Sultan's friend
- Fahima Awan as Faryal Ahmed: Nageen's colleague (Dead)
- Salma Shaheen as Faryal's mother
- Zohreh Ali as Ramsha Ahmed: Haroon's ex-girlfriend; Sikander's ex-wife (Dead)

== Awards and nominations ==
Deewangi has been successfully able to sweep major nominations at Lux Style Awards and Pakistan International Screen Awards in 2021.

Date of ceremony	Award	Category	Recipients	Result
October 9, 2021	Lux Style Awards	Best Television Director	Zeeshan Ahmed	Nominated
October 9, 2021	Lux Style Awards	Best Television Play	Deewangi- 7th Sky Entertainment	Nominated
October 9, 2021	Lux Style Awards	Best Female Actor- Viewer's choice	Hiba Bukhari	Nominated
October 9, 2021	Lux Style Awards	Best Male Actor- Viewer's choice	Danish Taimoor	Won
November 5, 2021	Pakistan International Screen Awards	Best Director	Zeeshan Ahmed	Nominated
November 5, 2021	Pakistan International Screen Awards	Best Writer	Sadia Akhtar	Nominated
November 5, 2021	Pakistan International Screen Awards	Best Television Serial	Deewangi - 7th Sky Entertainment	Nominated
November 5, 2021	Pakistan International Screen Awards	Best TV Actor - Popular	Danish Taimoor	Nominated
November 5, 2021	Pakistan International Screen Awards	Best TV Actress - Popular	Hiba Bukhari	Nominated
November 5, 2021	Pakistan International Screen Awards	Best Supporting Actor	Ali Abbas	Nominated
November 5, 2021	Pakistan International Screen Awards	Best Title Track/OST	Deewangi - Sahir Ali Bagga – Deewangi	Nominated

== Controversy ==
After the terror incident on Pakistan Stock Exchange in July 2020, the terrorist attacker's car was spotted in a later episode of the series, sparking a reaction from audiences due to the strange coincidence.

== Sequel ==
Jan Nisar serves as a sequel to the series; it was launched on 11 May 2024 on the same network, Geo Entertainment, and stars the same lead cast. The series was reported as the fastest Pakistani production to reach 2 billion views on YouTube. Hamza Roo for Daily Pakistan wrote that it was a "compelling drama on police, urges reforms in the vital organ of the state"
