= Berukhi =

Pakistani drama television serial

- Genre: Drama
- Written by: Ghazala Naqvi
- Directed by: Mohsin Mirza
- Starring: Hiba Bukhari; Junaid Khan; Nazish Jahangir
- Country of origin: Pakistan
- Original language: Urdu
- No. of episodes: 28

Production
- Producer: Abdullah Seja
- Production company: iDream Entertainment

Original release
- Network: ARY Digital
- Release: 15 September 2021 – 23 March 2022

Berukhi (lit. 'Indifference') is a Pakistani drama television series produced by Abdullah Seja under banner iDream Entertainment. It is directed by Mohsin Mirza and written by Ghazala Naqvi. It stars Hiba Bukhari and Junaid Khan in their third project together after Silsilay (2018) and Inteha-e-Ishq (2021) with Nazish Jahangir as an antagonist. It first aired on 15 September 2021 on ARY Digital.

== Cast ==
- Hiba Bukhari as Sabeen Ahmed/Sabeen Irteza Ali Baig
- Junaid Khan as Sahebzada Irteza Ali Baig
- Nazish Jahangir as Maira Mansoor
- Iffat Rahim as Nazia Mansoor
- Saba Hameed as Shah Bano
- Rehan Sheikh as Mansoor Ahmad
- Usman Peerzada as Agha Alamdar
- Hassan Ahmed as Kamran
- Nida Mumtaz as Sabeen's mother
- Noor ul Hassan as Masroor
- Afshan Qureshi as Atiya
- Birjees Farooqui as Saima (Sam)
- Rehma Zaman as Sana
- Hira Umer
