= Hiba Qadir =

Pakistani actress (born 1994)

- حبا بخاری
- Born: Hiba Bukhari; 29 June 1994 (age 32); Karachi, Sindh, Pakistan
- Education: Bachelor's in Commerce
- Alma mater: St. Joseph college for women
- Occupations: Actress; singer
- Years active: 2015–present
- Known for: Deewangi (2019); Meray Humnasheen (2022); Jaan Nisar (2024); Radd (2024)
- Spouse: Arez Ahmed (m. 2022)
- Children: 1
- Awards: Hum Awards

Hiba Qadir (born 29 June 1994) also popularly known as Hiba Bukhari is a Pakistani actress. She had gained her popularity through her role as Seemal in Thori Si Wafa (2017) and Nageen in Deewangi (2019). She is the Recipient of Hum Awards. Bukhari is widely and often referred to as the "Rating Queen" for her brilliant performances in series.

Then she made her appearances and shown her wider popularity through successful series Fitoor (2021), Meray Humnasheen (2022), Tere Ishq Ke Naam (2023), Radd (2024), Jaan Nisar (2024) and Main Zameen Tu Aasmaan (2025).

== Early and personal life ==
Hiba was born on 29 June 1994 in Karachi to a Sindhi family. She obtained her F.Sc from Jinnah Government College in Nazimabad. Hiba got married with Bholi Bano and Inteha e Ishq co-actor Arez Ahmed in a private Nikah ceremony held on 7 January 2022. On 30 September 2024, Hiba and Arez announced their pregnancy through social media. On 28 December 2024, the couple announced the birth of their daughter, Aynur on social media.

== Career ==
=== Debut and success (2015–2018) ===
After making her acting debut in 2015 with a recurring role in Syed Mohammad Ahmed's Teri Meri Jodi, Bukhari appeared in a supporting role of a cunning neighbor in 2016 in Iqra Aziz and Shehzad Sheikh's highly rated Choti Si Zindagi.

In 2017, she appeared as the titular Bano in her first lead role in Geo TV's Bholi Bano alongside Syed Jibran and Arez Ahmed. The same year, she played the leading role of a poverty-stricken working woman in Hum TV's soap opera Thori Si Wafa, for which she won the Hum Award for Best Soap Actress.

Her first role in 2018 was that of a mischievous college student in Silsilay opposite Junaid Khan, Momal Sheikh and Muneeb Butt earning her little recognition and emerged positive reviews from audiences. Then, she appeared in Family emotional series Haara Dil opposite Danish Taimoor.

=== Established actress with Experimental roles (2019–present) ===
In 2019, she played the girl next door in Ramz-e-Ishq, and later appeared in her breakthrough role as a headstrong bus hostess in blockbuster romantic series Deewangi. The series marked her second on-screen appearance with Danish Taimoor and earned her a Lux Style Award for Best Television Actress nomination. She made her second appearance with Syed Jibran and Arez Ahmed in her only appearance in 2020 on Hum TV's Tarap, where she played a damsel in distress.

In 2021, she played a married woman with a past love opposite Faysal Quraishi and Wahaj Ali in Fitoor. Then, bukhari acted in Inteha e Ishq and Berukhi opposite Junaid Khan in their third collaboration. Then, she appeared as a determined Pashtun medical student in Meray Humnasheen. The same year, she appeared as a mother of two seeking divorce from her husband in Hum TV's Pehchaan. She then made her fifth on-screen appearance with real-life partner Arez Ahmed in Aan TV's Ishq Nahin Aasan.

Her first role in 2023 was that of the spilt daughter of a rich and influential father in ARY Digital's Tere Ishq Ke Naam opposite Zaviyar Nauman Ijaz and Usama Khan. Bukhari then appeared as a strong-headed school teacher in Hashim Nadeem's written Jhok Sarkar opposite Farhan Saeed. In 2024, Hiba appeared in Geo Entertainment's television series Jaan Nisar. She also appeared in the lead role with Sheheryar Munawar Siddiqui and Arslan Naseer in drama series Radd on ARY Digital.

In 2025, Hiba played as a college student in Main Zameen Tu Aasmaan opposite Feroze Khan and Hina Chaudhary in their first collaboration. Bukhari also appeared in Humrahi, marking her fourth collaboration with Danish Taimoor, after the success of their previous series Haara Dil, Deewangi and Jaan Nisar.

== Other work and media image ==
Hiba Bukhari was the first Pakistani actress to have two dramas cross the 1 billion views milestone on YouTube, with her dramas Fitoor and Jaan Nisar achieving the feat. She has since her third drama Deewangi had also reached the same milestone. In 2020, Hiba was featured in "Top 10 Most Promising New Pakistani Actors" list, for her performance in Silsilay, Ramz-e-Ishq and Deewangi. In 2021, Bukhari was featured in "Most Popular Pakistani Actors" list.

Then, she was placed in "Impressive Performances By Pakistani Actresses" list for her performance in Fitoor. In 2022, Hiba was placed in "Best Pakistani Actresses" list, for her performance in Meray Humnasheen and Pehchaan. In 2024, Bukhari was placed 37th in "Eastern Eye's Top 50 Asian Stars of 2024". and also, in the same year she was featured in "Top 10 Pakistani Actresses" list for her performance in Jaan Nisar and Radd.

== Filmography ==
=== TV series ===
Year	Title	Role	Network	Notes	Ref
2015–2016	Teri Meri Jodi	Jarya	Geo Entertainment	Debut series	
2016–2017	Choti Si Zindagi	Saiqa	Hum TV		
2017	Bholi Bano	Bano	Geo Entertainment	Debut as lead actress	
2017	Teri Meri Kahani	Farwa	A-Plus Entertainment		
2017–2018	Thori Si Wafa	Seemal	Hum TV		
2018	Silsilay	Hira	Geo Entertainment		
2018	Haara Dil	Momina Abrar	A-Plus Entertainment		
2019–2020	Ramz-e-Ishq	Roshni Wajahat Ali	Geo Entertainment		
2019–2020	Deewangi	Nageen Fayaz	Geo Entertainment		
2020	Tarap	Zunaira	Hum TV		
2021	Fitoor	Dilnasheen Haider	Geo Entertainment		
2021–2022	Inteha e Ishq	Rida	A-Plus Entertainment		
2021–2022	Berukhi	Sabeen Irteza Ali Baig	ARY Digital		
2022	Meray Humnasheen	Dr. Khajistah Dilawar Khan	Geo Entertainment		
2022	Pehchaan	Sharmeen Adnan (Kukki)	Hum TV		
2022–2023	Ishq Nahin Aasan	Zara	Aan TV		
2023	Tere Ishq Ke Naam	Ruthba	ARY Digital		
2023	Qabeel	Khatija	Aur Life		
2023	Jhok Sarkar	Sassi	Hum TV		
2024	Radd	Emaan Salaar Shah	ARY Digital		
2024	Jaan Nisar	Dua Nosherwan	Geo Entertainment		
2025–2026	Main Zameen Tu Aasmaan	Hooram	Green Entertainment		
2026	Humrahi	Elif / Ilham	Geo Entertainment		
2026	Rutba	Mahnoor	ARY Digital		

=== Telefilms and special appearances ===
Year	Title	Role	Network	Ref	Notes
2020	Lo Pakray Gaye	Haniya	Geo Entertainment		Telefilm
2021	Chahat	Fiza	Urdu 1		Short film
2021	Zoya Nay Haan Kardi	Zoya	Geo Entertainment		Telefilm
2021	Wedding Virus	Hina	ARY Digital		Telefilm
2022	Dream Villa Ki Confused Love Story	Rushna	ARY Digital		Telefilm
2023	Mummy Nahi Maanain Gi	Aima	ARY Digital		Telefilm
2024	BOL Kahani	Sherwani	BOL Network		Episode: "Do Anjaane"
2025	Dil Ne Kaha Dil Se	Marvi	Geo Entertainment		Telefilm
2025	BOL Kahani	Neeli	BOL Network		Episode: "Jesa Filmon Mai Hota Hai"

=== Reality shows ===
Year	Title	Role	Network	Ref
2019	Mazaaq Raat	Herself	Dunya News	
2020	BOL Nights with Ahsan Khan	Herself	BOL Network	
2020	Jeeway Pakistan	Herself	Express Entertainment	

== Awards and nominations ==
Year	Work	Category	Result	Ref.
Lux Style Awards
2021	Deewangi	Best TV Actress - Viewer's Choice	Nominated	
2022	Fitoor	Best TV Actress - Viewer's Choice	Nominated	
2022	Berukhi	Best TV Actress - Critics' Choice	Nominated	
2023	Meray Humnasheen	Best TV Actress - Viewer's Choice	Nominated	
2025	Tere Ishq Ke Naam	Best TV Actress - Viewer's Choice	Nominated	
2025	Jhok Sarkar	Best TV Actress - Critics' Choice	Nominated	
2025	Radd	Best Actor of the Year - Female Viewers’ Choice	Nominated	
2025	Jaan Nisar	Best Actor of the Year - Female Viewers’ Choice	Nominated	
Hum Awards
2018	Thori Si Wafa	Best Soap Actress	Won	
2024	Jhok Sarkar	Best Actress Popular	Nominated	
2024	Jhok Sarkar	Best Actress Jury	Nominated	
2024	Jhok Sarkar	Best Onscreen Couple Popular with Farhan Saeed	Nominated	
2024	Jhok Sarkar	Best Onscreen Couple Jury with Farhan Saeed	Nominated	
Pakistan International Screen Awards
2021	Deewangi	Best TV Actress - Popular	Nominated	
2026	Jaan Nisar	Best On-Screen Couple with Danish Taimoor	Nominated	
International Pakistan Prestige Awards
2023	Meray Humnasheen	Best Actor (Female) TV Serial	Nominated	
2023	Meray Humnasheen	Best On-Screen Couple TV Serial with Ahsan Khan	Won	
Sukooon Kya Drama Hai Icon Awards
2025	Jaan Nisar	Best Actress (Popular Choice)	Nominated	
