= Main Zameen Tu Aasmaan =

2025 Pakistani television series

- میں زمین تُو آسمان
- Genre: Drama; Romance
- Written by: Abdul Khaliq Khan
- Directed by: Ahmed Bhatti
- Starring: Feroze Khan; Hiba Bukhari; Mehmood Aslam; Hasan Niazi; Shahood Alvi
- Theme music composer: Naveed Nashad
- Opening theme: "Main Zameen Tu Aasmaan" by Rahat Fateh Ali Khan
- Ending theme: "Main Zameen Tu Aasmaan" by Rahat Fateh Ali Khan
- Country of origin: Pakistan
- Original language: Urdu
- No. of seasons: 1
- No. of episodes: 40

Production
- Producer: Tehreem Chaudhary
- Production locations: Karachi, Pakistan
- Camera setup: Multi-camera setup
- Running time: 37 minutes
- Production company: Multiverse Entertainment

Original release
- Network: Green Entertainment
- Release: 27 August 2025 – 8 January 2026

Main Zameen Tu Aasmaan (میں زمین تُو آسمان; transl. I Am the Earth, You Are the Sky) is a 2025 Pakistani television drama series produced by Tehreem Chaudhary under the banner of Multiverse Entertainment. Written by Abdul Khaliq Khan and directed by Ahmed Bhatti, it stars Feroze Khan and Hiba Bukhari in the lead roles, alongside Mehmood Aslam, Hasan Niazi, Shahood Alvi, Hammad Shoaib, Hina Chaudhry, Nida Mumtaz and Rabia Noreen. The series premiered on Green Entertainment on 27 August 2025 and concluded on 8 January 2026, comprising 40 episodes.

== Plot ==
The series follows Shahzil, the younger son of property developer Sultan Ahmed, who is kept away from his family's criminal activities. His older brother Sufiyan becomes jealous of him and attempts to damage his relationship with their father. Shahzil falls in love with Hooram, a young woman connected to Shahabuddin, whose hotel becomes the target of Sultan's business interests. Their relationship develops amid family rivalries and conflicting loyalties.

== Cast ==
- Feroze Khan as Shahzil Sultan
- Hiba Bukhari as Hooram
- Mehmood Aslam as Sultan Ahmed
- Hassan Niazi as Sufiyan
- Shahood Alvi as Shahabuddin
- Hammad Shoaib as Akber
- Hina Chaudhry as Zoya
- Nida Mumtaz as Fareeda
- Rabia Noreen as Zakiya
- Sharmeen Ali as Amaya Sufiyan
- Rehma Zaman as Mumtaz
- Osama Tahir as Farhan
- Tauseeq Haider as Taimoor Shah
- Awais Suleman as Usama
- Adnan Jaffar as Manal
- Syed Afzal Ali as Abdul Ghani
- Sumaira Asghar as Professor Ghaznavi

== Music ==
The original soundtrack was released before the series premiered. It features vocals by Rahat Fateh Ali Khan and Wardah Lodhi, with music composed by Naveed Nashad and lyrics written by Qamar Nashad. Ahmed Bhatti directed the soundtrack's music video, which features Feroze Khan and Hiba Bukhari.

== Production ==
The drama was developed by Multiverse Entertainment and produced by Tehreem Chaudhary. Abdul Khaliq Khan wrote the screenplay, while Ahmed Bhatti directed the series. The project brought together Feroze Khan and Hiba Bukhari, making the first time on-screen collaboration. The casting and soundtrack were publicised before the drama's television premiere. The project was among Green Entertainment's announced television productions for 2025.

== Broadcast ==
Main Zameen Tu Aasman premiered on Green Entertainment on 27 August 2025. The series was broadcast on the television network and its episodes were also distributed through the official Green TV Entertainment YouTube channel. The first episode was uploaded on 27 August 2025. The series continued its broadcast and concluded with its 40th and final episode on 8 January 2026.

== Reception ==
In its review published on 6 September 2025, Dawn described the series as a highly stylised romantic drama, comparing its storytelling approach to commercial Hindi cinema. The review discussed the central family conflict and the performances of Feroze Khan and Hiba Bukhari.

In its review published on 5 October 2025, Dawn Images praised the series' fast-paced storytelling and action sequences. It also commented on the performances of the lead actors and the relationship dynamics between the characters.
