= Fahima Awan =

Pakistani actress

- Born: 19 December 1982 (age 43); Karachi, Pakistan
- Education: University of Karachi
- Occupation: Actress
- Years active: 2000 – present
- Children: 2

Fahima Awan is a Pakistani actress known for her roles in the dramas Kam Zarf, Fitoor, Betiyaan and Siyani.

== Early life ==
Fahima was born on 19 December 1982 in Karachi. She completed her studies from University of Karachi.

== Career ==
Fahima started working as a model in 2000 and appeared in music videos and commercials. She was noted for her roles in dramas Mah-e-Tamaam, Qurban, Baichan Dil, Ru Baru Ishq Tha, Mera Wajood and Kasak. Then she appeared in dramas Haara Dil, Aik Thi Rania, Gul-o-Gulzar, Dunk, Darr Khuda Say and Fitoor. She has also appeared in the dramas Mohabbat Chor Di Maine, Haseena, Kam Zarf, Ruswai, Bechari Qudsia, Laapata and Qismat Ka Likha.

== Personal life ==
Awan is married and has two children. Her husband died in 2022.

== Filmography ==
=== Television ===
Year	Title	Role	Network
2017	Qurban	Shehnaz	ARY Digital
2017	Tishnagi Dil Ki	Neelam	Geo TV
2017	Dil-e-Bekhabar	Tarannum	A-Plus
2017	Aik Thi Rania	Ayeza	Geo Entertainment
2018	Maa Sadqey	Jumaila	Hum TV
2018	Haara Dil	Areej	A-Plus
2018	Bechari Nadia	Mona	ARY Digital
2018	Alif Allah Aur Insaan	Sarwat	Hum TV
2018	Ru Baru Ishq Tha	Hamna	Geo Entertainment
2018	Phir Wohi Dil	Naheed	ARY Digital
2018	Mah-e-Tamaam	Sabi	Hum TV
2019	Darr Khuda Say	Aasia	Geo Entertainment
2019	Gul-o-Gulzar	Zeba	ARY Digital
2019	Makafaat Season 1	Anjum	Geo TV
2019	Deewangi	Faryal	Geo Entertainment
2019	Qismat Ka Likha	Shaista	Express Entertainment
2019	Kam Zarf	Nazma	Geo Entertainment
2019	Ruswai	Madiha	ARY Digital
2020	Kasak	Naima	ARY Digital
2020	Prem Gali	Dua	ARY Digital
2020	Mera Wajood	Tahira	Express Entertainment
2020	Dikhawa Season 1	Nazia	Geo Entertainment
2020	Aye Muhabbat	Noor	TV One
2020	Dunk	Saman	ARY Digital
2021	Fitoor	Sara	Geo Entertainment
2021	Oye Motti Season 1	Durdana	Express Entertainment
2021	Dikhawa Season 2	Hira	Geo Entertainment
2021	Emaan	Fouzia	LTN Family
2021	Makafaat Season 3	Sharjeel's mother	Geo Entertainment
2021	Badnaseeb	Zubi	Hum TV
2021	Bechari Qudsia	Naila	Geo Entertainment
2021	Laapata	Rehana	Hum TV
2021	Mohabbat Chor Di Maine	Aniba	Geo Entertainment
2022	Makafaat Season 4	Sara	Geo TV
2022	Meri Hai Kiya Khata	Ruby	Aan TV
2022	Mazaaq Raat	Herself	Dunya News
2022	Rasm-e-Ulfat	Saleema	PTV
2022	Haseena	Masooma	A-Plus
2022	Dikhawa Season 3	Sara	Geo Entertainment
2022	Baichan Dil	Najia	Aaj Entertainment
2022	Siyani	Faiza	Geo Entertainment
2022	Zindagi Aik Paheli	Nazia	Geo Entertainment
2022	Betiyaan	Salma	ARY Digital
2023	Abdullah	Nazia	Geo Entertainment
2023	Ahsaas	Annie	Express Entertainment
2023	Bojh	Jia	Geo Entertainment
2023	Ehraam-e-Junoon	Ramsha	Geo Entertainment
2023	Hona Tha Pyar	Pari	Aan TV
2023	Mujhay Qabool Nahin	Aliya	Geo TV
2023	Jannat Se Aagay	Bride	Geo Entertainment
2023	Pyari Nimmo	Ayesha	Geo Entertainment
2023	Fitna	Rizwana	Hum TV
2023	Working Women	Erum	Green Entertainment
2023	Khushbo Mein Basay Khat	Tabinda	Hum TV
2024	Saraab	Shama	Aur Life
2024	Dikhawa Season 5	Saba	Geo Entertainment
2024	Dao	Taniya	Geo Entertainment
2024	Tum Mere Kya Ho	Samina	Hum TV
2024	Gentleman	Shagufta	Green Entertainment
2024	Teri Chhaon Mein	Laila	Hum TV
2024	Barat Nahi Aaii	Mehrunnisa	Set Entertainment
2024	Ghair	Malahat	ARY Digital
2025	Hijr	Mehwish	Hum TV
2025	Dastak	Sara	ARY Digital
2025	Aas Paas	Aneela Musheer	Geo Entertainment
2025	Qubool Hai	Sakina	Express Entertainment
2025	Pehli Mohabbat	Annie	Hum TV
2025	Humraaz	Sara	Geo TV
2025	Mubarakan Mubarakan	Sheema	Aur Life
2025	Sanwal Yaar Piya	Shakira	Geo TV
2025	Case No. 9	Saba	Geo Entertainment
2025	Dorr	Musarrat	Express Entertainment
2026	Rang De	Aiman	Geo TV

=== Music video ===
Year	Song	Singer(s)	Notes
2000	Tera Kangna Jab Khanke	Shehzad Roy	
2003	Kangna	Shehzad Roy	
