= Meray Humnasheen =

2022 Television series

- Urdu: میرے ہمنشیں
- Genre: Drama, Medical Studies Drama
- Written by: Misbah Ali Syed
- Directed by: Ali Faizan
- Starring: Ahsan Khan; Hiba Bukhari; Shahzad Sheikh; Syed Jibran; Momina Iqbal; Moomal Khalid
- Opening theme: Zeb Bangash
- Country of origin: Pakistan
- Original language: Urdu
- No. of episodes: 43

Production
- Producers: Abdullah Kadwani; Asad Qureshi
- Production company: 7th Sky Entertainment

Original release
- Network: Geo Entertainment
- Release: 6 May – 1 October 2022

Meray Humnasheen (Urdu: میرے ہمنشیں, transl. My Partner) is a 2022 Pakistani television drama series, written by Misbah Ali Syed, directed by Ali Faizan and produced by Abdullah Kadwani and Asad Qureshi. The series stars Hiba Bukhari, Ahsan Khan, Shahzad Sheikh, Syed Jibran, Momina Iqbal & Moomal Khalid. It revolves around the journey of an aspiring doctor, who aims to bring medical care to her remote area which is devoid of medical facilities due to which she had lost her parents. She faces several hurdles in realizing her goal. The series aired from 6 May 2022 to 1 October 2022, every Friday and Saturday, with a total of 43 episodes.

The series received critical praise due to its storyline but was criticised for the stereotypical portrayal of Pakhtoons.

== Plot ==
Khajistah Dilawar Khan, a young Pashtun orphan student who hails from Swat, aspires to become a doctor as her mother died due to an illness as there was no doctor in her area. She is engaged to her cousin Darakhzai Khan who is somehow arrogant and doesn't want to study further but loves her deeply inside, where Khajistah Not . However, Darakhzai's elder brother Amroz loves Khajistah as his younger sister and supports her to study further. Due to his support, Khajistah convinces her family's elders and goes to the city in the medical college for further studies for five years.

There, she becomes friends with Biya, and meets Dr. Hadi Sheharyar and his cousin and fiancé Aima. Hadi starts to fall in love with Khajistah, which angers Aima. Hadi's father Sheharyar and his wife Sabika force Hadi's younger brother, Hasan to become a doctor too but Hasan is also an arrogant person because he grew up without his parents. Aima starts to hate Khajistah because Hadi had started to like her, so she gets Hasan's help to find many ways to bring Khajistah down.

Then, the whole hospital goes on a field trip to Khajistah's home. But, after Darakhzai sees her helping other men, Darakhzai stops Khajistah and takes her away, angering Hadi. When Khajistah returns to the hospital along with everyone else, Darakhzai starts to miss Khajistah, while she is abroad, so that makes him change into a good person and decides to make a hospital in his area in Khajistah's name.

Darakhzai has a feud with Behram Khan, who is the relative of Amroz's wife Shanzay, because after Khajistah's father was murdered by Behram Khan's henchmen, Amroz started to hate Shanzay for this. Five years later, before Khajistah's convocation, Aima and Hasan then frame Khajistah for doing drugs, but they tell the warden beforehand, so that Khajistah can be seen with the drugs. Hadi then figures out that the warden knows everything. At Khajistah's convocation, she gives a speech about how people from small villages are bullied and harassed in the city, and she leaves in sadness.

Khajistah finds the number that called the warden, and when she gives it to Hadi, he finds out that he gave his phone to Hasan the day that Khajistah got framed for the drugs, and he finds out that Hasan planned this. He goes home, and yells at Hasan, and thinks that his parents were also involved. Aima then tells Hasan not to tell everyone that she was involved too, but he does take her name and reveals her whole planning to the family, which makes everyone mad at Aima.

At Khajistah's home, everyone starts preparing for her and Darakhzai's wedding, and she realizes how much Darakhzai has changed. Amroz starts to like Shanzay again and he forgives her. Behram Khan then enters and reveals that he was the one who murdered Khajistah's father. Amroz decides to forgive him, since it's Khajistah's wedding day. Then, Sanobar, the servant of Khajistah's family, finds poison to give to Khajistah because Sanobar likes Darakhzai. So she puts the poison on kalakand, since Khajistah likes kalakand, but Darakhzai decides to eat the poisoned kalakand instead. While Darakhzai is dancing, he has a pain in his chest and collapses to the floor, and then Darakhzai dies, on the spot.

Sanobar tells Khajistah to eat the kalakand but Khajistah tells Sanobar that Darakhzai ate it. Then, someone comes in and says that Darakhzai has died. Sanobar starts to break down after hearing that Darakhzai died, and starts to regret her decision. Behram Khan gets blamed for Darakhzai's death, because he brought some sweets, too. Amroz sees Behram Khan at Darakhzai's funeral and he vows to bring Behram Khan's whole family down.

Sanobar starts going crazy and confesses to Darakhzai's mother Safoora that she killed Darakhzai, the man that she loved, and she even revealed that she wanted to kill Khajistah instead. Amroz befriends Behram Khan again after hearing this confession. Aima starts to ask for forgiveness from everybody, but no one forgives her. Hadi starts to leave for America, but doesn't reconcile with Hasan and Aima, and says goodbye to his parents. Amroz's father Saif Khan tells Amroz that he should marry Khajistah, which he is against because he is already married to Shanzay and is about to become a father.

6 years later, Khajistah is now working at the new Darakhzai Hospital in her area that Darakhzai made. Khajistah and Amroz are still cousins, since they haven't gotten married, and Shanzay is taking care of her new son, whom Khajistah also named Darakhzai. Hadi hasn't seen his family in the past six years, but his father goes to America and they catch up. Hasan is now married, with a 3-year-old son named Sunny, and he decides to go on a vacation with his wife to the mountains. There, Hasan's wife falls down and gets hurt, so he takes her to Darakhzai Hospital, where he reunites with Khajistah. Hasan explains to her that Hadi hasn't come back and he tells her that she is the only one who can bring him back, but Khajistah brushes him off.

After leaving the hospital with his wife, Hasan meets Amroz, who tells him about Darakhzai's death, then Hasan thinks about bringing Hadi back to marry Khajistah. He tells Hadi's former professor to tell him to come back to Pakistan to help with a hospital in the northern areas, and when the professor tells Hadi, Hadi does indeed come back. Hadi goes inside the professor's office, where he reunites with Khajistah. Hadi and Khajistah then catch up and they open up a heart centre in the mountains together. Hasan then asks for forgiveness from both of them for what he did to them in the past but Hadi hugs him and forgives him. After some time, Khajistah and Hadi are walking in the forest together having a fun time, implying that they were married and lived happily ever after.

== Cast ==
=== Main ===
- Hiba Bukhari as Dr. Khajistah Dilawar Khan/Sheharyar : Hadi's wife, Saif Khan and Safoora's niece, Amroz's younger cousin, Darakhzai's cousin and fiancée, Sheharyar and Sabika's daughter-in-law, Hasan's sister-in-law and Jr.Darakhzai's aunt
- Ahsan Khan as Darakhzai Khan, Saif Khan and Safoora's younger son, Amroz's younger brother, Khajistah's cousin and fiancé and Jr. Darakhzai's uncle (dead)
- Shahzad Sheikh as Dr.Hadi Sheharyar : Sheharyar and Sabika Sheharyar's elder son, Aima's cousin and fiancé, Hasan's elder brother, Sobia's nephew, Khajistah's husband
- Syed Jibran as Amroz Khan : Saif Khan and Safoora's elder son, Darakhzai's elder brother, Khajistah's elder cousin, Shanzay's husband, Jr. Darakhzai's father
- Momina Iqbal as Shanzay Amroz Khan : Amroz's wife, Saif Khan and Safoora's daughter-in-law and Jr.Darakhzai's mother
- Moomal Khalid as Dr. Aima Sheharyar, Hadi cousin and fiancé, Hasan's elder cousin, Sheharyar and Sabika's niece, Sobia's daughter

=== Supporting ===
- Farhan Ally Agha as Dr. Sheharyar, Hadi and Hasan's father, Sabika's husband, Sobia's brother, Aima's uncle, Khajistah's father-in-law
- Haris Waheed as Hasan Sheharyar, Hadi's younger brother, Sheharyar and Sabika's younger son, Aima's younger cousin, Sobia's younger nephew, Khajistah's brother-in-law and Sunny's father
- Rehan Sheikh as Saif Khan, Amroz & Darakhzai's father and Khajistah's uncle, Shanzay's father-in-law, Safoora's husband and Jr.Darakhzai's grandfather
- Salma Hassan as Dr. Sabika Sheharyar, Sheharyar's wife, Hadi and Hasan's mother, Aima's aunt, Sobia's sister-in-law, Khajistah's mother-in-law
- Munazzah Arif as Safoora Saif Khan, Amroz & Darakhzai's mother and Khajistah's aunt, Shanzay's mother-in-law, Saif Khan's wife and Jr.Darakhzai's Grandmother
- Mehar Bano as Sanobar, Khajistah's family's servant and Darakhzai's secret lover
- Seemi Pasha as Sobia Sheharyar, Sheharyar's sister, Sabika's sister-in-law, Hadi and Hasan's aunt, Aima's mother
- Rehma Zaman as Biya Rehman, Khajistah's friend
- Fareeda Shabbir as Bakhtawar, hospital warden
- Dania Enwer as Anna
- Birjees Farooqui as Taniya's mother, Sabika's colleague
- Rana Majid
- Sohail Masood
- Shaheen Khan as Aapa
- Mujtaba Abbas Khan as Dr.Fahad : Hadi, Aima and Hasan's friend
- Kehkashan Faisal as Farzana
- Majid Khhan
- Amjad Khan
- Salma Qadir as Rizwana
- Rehana Kaleem as Bilquis
- Haniya Ahmed as young Khajistah (child actor)

== Production ==
Meray Humnasheen is written by Misbah Ali Syed, and directed by Ali Faizan. The drama is produced by 7th Sky Entertainment. Bukhari revealed in an interview that, for the preparation of her role, she tried to learn the Pashto language dialect from her driver and chaiwala.

== Reception ==
=== Critical reception ===
The series received criticism due to reinforcement of several stereotypes associated with Pakhtoons such as arrogant males and heavy thick language accents. The storyline was however praised. While reviewing the series after 30 episodes, Youline Magazine praised the performances of all the leading actors, said Khan's performance was similar to his previous performances, and criticized the stereotypical portrayal of a region with highly literacy rate.
