= Noor ul Hassan =

Pakistani host, actor and television presenter (born 1970 )

Noor Ul Hassan
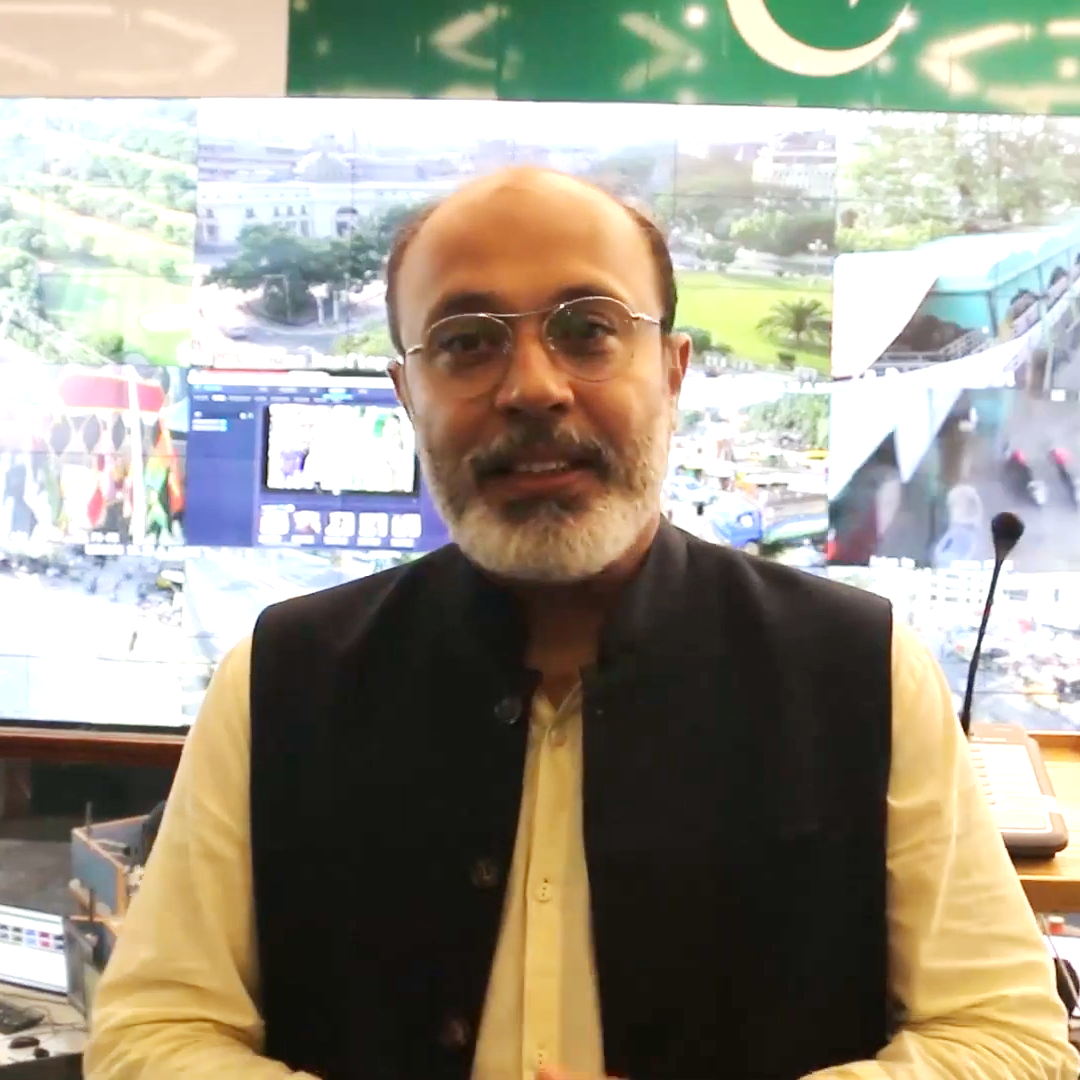
- Noor ul Hassan in 2019
- Born: Lahore, Punjab, Pakistan
- Education: National College of Arts, Lahore
- Occupations: Actor; Host; Television presenter
- Years active: 1990s–present
- Children: 3

Noor Ul Hassan (in Punjabi and Urdu: نور الحسن) is a Pakistani actor, television presenter, television host, and compère. He hosted the Ramadan transmission in 2011 and in 2014 for PTV Home. He has appeared in acclaimed television serials such as Ishq Jalebi, Dar Si Jaati Hai Sila, Aangan, Ranjha Ranjha Kardi and Cheekh, and in the 2025 drama Case No.9.

== Career ==
=== Early career (1980s-1990s) ===
Hassan made his first television appearance in 1986, when he was a chorus singer for a na'at recitation on PTV, before making his professional acting debut in the 1990s, featuring in a few episodes of Teen Bata Teen (1998). He gained nationwide popularity with PTV quiz show Fungama in 2001.

He later appeared in different television serials such as Kollege Jeans and Wrong Numbers. In 2012, he acted in Ab Ke Sawan Barsay.

=== Breakthrough (2017-present) ===
In 2017, he appeared was cast in Hum TV's Alif Allah Aur Insaan. In the same year, Hassan appeared in Dar Si Jaati Hai Sila and ARY Digital's Aangan. In 2019, he appeared in Cheekh and Geo TV's Deewangi. He played a dervish in season 3 of Khuda Aur Mohabbat which released in 2021. The same year, he acted in Geo's Ramzan special Ishq Jalebi, playing the role of Ashiq Hussain.

In March 2022, he was cast in the Turkish television series based on the life of Salahuddin Ayyubi, Kudüs Fatihi Selahaddin Eyyubi.

== Filmography ==
=== Television serials ===
| Year | Title | Role | Network | Ref(s) |
|---|---|---|---|---|
| 1995 | Teen Bata Teen | | PTV Network | |
| 1998 | Wrong Numbers | Jawad Bashir | PTV Network | |
| 1999 | Kollege Jeans | | PTV Network | |
| 2012 | Ab Ke Sawan Barsay | Tauqeer | Express Entertainment | |
| 2012 | Thakan | Khursheed | ARY Digital | |
| 2013 | Dil Mohallay Ki Haveli | Azeem | Geo Entertainment | |
| 2013 | Ranjish Hi Sahi | | Geo Entertainment | |
| 2014 | Shab E Zindagi | Yasir's elder brother | Hum TV | |
| 2014 | Do Saal Ki Aurat | Hajra's relative | Hum TV | |
| 2015 | Kaise Huaye Benaam | Asim | Geo Entertainment | |
| 2016 | Intezaar | Kareem | A-Plus TV | |
| 2016 | Dumpukht - Aatish e Ishq | Moulvi Sahab | A-Plus TV | |
| 2017 | Sammi | Fazal ud din aka Ba Fazal | Hum TV | |
| 2017 | Munkir | Majid | TV One | |
| 2017 | Alif Allah Aur Insaan | Qadir Ali | Hum TV | |
| 2017 | Imam Zamin | Iqbal | TV One | |
| 2017 | Dar Si Jaati Hai Sila | Saleem | Hum TV | |
| 2017 | Aangan | Sajjad | ARY Digital | |
| 2017 | Meeras | Jahan Aara's employee, 5 percent | ARY Digital | |
| 2018 | Lamhay | Rajab | A-Plus TV | |
| 2018 | Lashkara | Muneer Ahmed | ARY Digital | |
| 2018 | Ranjha Ranjha Kardi | Shoka | Hum TV | |
| 2019 | Cheekh | Ramzan Ahmed | ARY Digital | |
| 2019 | Inkaar | Murtaza Wahab | Hum TV | |
| 2019 | Deewangi | Rashid | Geo Entertainment | |
| 2020 | Tum Ho Wajah | Ghafoor | Hum TV | |
| 2020 | Bandhay Aik Dor Say | Fareed | Geo Entertainment | |
| 2020 | Kasa-e-Dil | Shireen's father | Geo Entertainment | |
| 2021 | Qayamat | Fayaz | Geo Entertainment | |
| 2021 | Dil Na Umeed To Nahi | Qazi Jaleel | TV One | |
| 2021 | Khuda Aur Muhabbat (season 3) | Darvesh Baba | Geo Entertainment | |
| 2021 | Ishq Jalebi | Aashiq Hussain | Geo Entertainment | |
| 2021 | Yaar Na Bichray | Zafar | Hum TV | |
| 2021 | Berukhi | | ARY Digital | |
| 2021 | Koyal | Affaq Ahmed | Aaj Entertainment | |
| 2022 | Chaudhry and Sons | Shakir | Geo Entertainment | |
| 2022 | Pehchaan | Kehkeshan's father | Hum TV | |
| 2022 | Bakhtawar | Bakhtawar's father | Hum TV | |
| 2022 | Qalandar | Ayub | Geo Entertainment | |
| 2023 | Samjhota | Sarmad's father | ARY Digital | |
| 2023 | Jeevan Nagar | Bara Karobari | Green Entertainment | |
| 2023 | Mannat Murad | Nafees, Mannat and Adil's elder brother | Geo Entertainment | |
| 2023 | Ishq Murshid | Salman, Shibra & Sukaina's father | Hum TV | |
| 2023 | Jaan e Jahan | Mahnoor's father | ARY Digital | |
| 2023 | Mujhe pyaar hua tha | Saad's father | ARY Digital | |
| 2024 | Shiddat | Sultan's father | Geo Entertainment | |
| 2024 | Khaie | Darwesh Khan | Geo Entertainment | |
| 2024 | Kaisi Hai Ye Ruswai | Shehzad Saleem | Express Entertainment | |
| 2024 | Kudüs Fatihi Selahaddin Eyyubi | Abdul Qadir Gilani | TRT 1 Hum TV | |
| 2025 | Mann Marzi | Syed Hassan | Geo Entertainment | |
| 2025 | Humraaz | Masood | Geo Entertainment | |
| 2025 | Case No 9 | Bukhari | Geo Entertainment | |
| 2026 | Aik Mohabbat Aur | | Green Entertainment | |
| 2026 | Mitti De Baway | DSP Nawaz Khan | Green Entertainment | |

=== Films ===
| Year | Title | Role | Notes |
|---|---|---|---|
| 2015 | Karachi Se Lahore | Policeman | |
| 2016 | Lahore Se Aagey | Balla | |
| 2016 | 8969 | | |
| 2016 | Actor in Law | | |
| 2018 | Load Wedding | Khalil | |
| 2022 | Parde Mein Rehne Do | Shafiq Rana | |
