= Haara Dil =

Pakistani television series

- Title Screen
- Written by: Rabia Razzaq
- Directed by: Furqan Adam
- Starring: Hiba Bukhari; Danish Taimoor
- Voices of: Papon; Nandini Srikar
- Theme music composer: Composer; Simaab Sen; Lyrics; Fatima Najib
- Opening theme: "Haara Dil"
- Country of origin: Pakistan
- Original language: Urdu
- No. of episodes: 26

Production
- Producers: Danish Taimoor; Hassan Zia
- Production company: Mastermind Productions

Original release
- Network: A-Plus Entertainment
- Release: 12 April – 3 October 2018

Haara Dil is a 2018 Pakistani television series directed by Furqan Adam and written by Rabia Razzaq. The show stars Hiba Bukhari and Danish Taimoor as leads. It premiered on 12 April 2018 on A-Plus TV and aired every Thursday. It tells the story of a middle-aged couple who gets pregnant, much to the disappointment of their adult daughter Momina, and the social pressure the family faces.

The drama shooting was completed in 2015 but it took 3 years to release. Before release, it created lots of buzz and curiosity as it was comeback project of Danish Taimoor after 3 years break from TV. In May 2018, it achieved 11.4 TRP, which was the highest single episode TRP for any Pakistani Drama. It is also noted that this was first ever Pakistani drama to get double digit TRP on single episode. To date, the drama holds the record for having highest ever TRP for A Plus Entertainment. It is the only drama of the channel to fetch TRP above 5. Danish Taimoor and Hiba Bukhari pair become extremely popular which was later repeated in all-time blockbusters like Deewangi and Jaan Nisar. The story of this drama inspired bollywood hit movie Badhaai Ho. On YouTube, it has been uploaded with many alternative titles and combined it has crossed over 1 billion views on just episodes only with episode 1 of the drama alone having over 130 million views. Globally, it has been dubbed into English, Turkish, Arabic, Farsi, Spanish, Portuguese, French, Russian, German, Tamil, Italian, Bahasa and Korean language. It is the only Pakistani drama to have 13 dubbed versions.

== Plot ==
Momina lives with her parents, Abraar and Shagufta, and her younger sister Abeer. Momina is in a relationship with Arham, a wealthy young man who is the son of Abraar's best friend, Afaan. Arham's mother, Amtul, and sister, Areej, dislike Momina as she belongs to a middle-class family.

Momina and Abeer are shocked when their mother informs them about her pregnancy. Arham is also shocked by the news but chooses to support Momina. Abraar learns that Shagufta is expecting a baby boy and refuses to terminate Shagufta's pregnancy. Amtul humiliates Shagufta. Due to the stress she faces, Shagufta has a premature delivery and dies during childbirth. Momina and Abeer blame Arham and Amtul for Shagufta's death.

Momina starts avoiding Arham. She spends her day caring for her little brother, Sami. Meanwhile, Abraar marries Fehmi. Amtul decides to get Arham engaged with Fiza, Areej's sister-in-law. Momina and Arham's relationship faces many trials and tribulations but eventually emerges victorious.

== Cast ==
- Hiba Bukhari as Momina Abrar - Abrar & Shagufta's daughter; Abeer & Sami's sister; Arham's love interest.
- Danish Taimoor as Arham Afaan - Afaan & Amtul's son; Areej's brother; Momina's love interest.
- Rabya Kulsoom as Abeer Abrar - Abrar & Shagufta's daughter; Momina & Sami's sister.
- Yashma Gill as Fiza - Areej's sister in law; Arham's prospect bride.
- Mehmood Aslam as Abrar - Shagufta's husband turned widower; Momina, Abeer & Sami's father; Fehmi's husband.
- Shaheen Khan as Shagufta Abrar - Abrar's wife; Momina, Abeer & Sami's mother.
- Seemi Pasha as Amtul Afaan - Afaan's wife; Arham & Areej's mother.
- Farah Nadir as Zeba
- Shehryar Zaidi as Afaan - Amtul's husband; Arham & Areej's father.
- Javeria Abbasi as Fehmi Abrar - Abrar's second wife; Momina, Abeer & Sami's stepmother.
- Rameez Siddiqui as Faraz
- Birjees Farooqui as Faraz's mother
- Fahima Awan as Areej Abrar - Abrar & Amtul's daughter; Arham's sister.
