= Fitoor (TV series) =

Pakistani televisions series

- Title card
- Genre: Romantic; Family
- Written by: Zanjabeel Asim Shah
- Directed by: Siraj-ul-Haque
- Starring: Faysal Qureshi; Wahaj Ali; Hiba Bukhari; Kiran Haq
- Opening theme: "Koi Aisa Dard" by Shani Arshad and Aima Baig
- Country of origin: Pakistan
- Original language: Urdu
- No. of episodes: 47

Production
- Producers: Abdullah Kadwani; Asad Qureshi
- Running time: 37 minutes approx.
- Production company: 7th Sky Entertainment

Original release
- Network: Geo Entertainment
- Release: 14 January – 22 September 2021

Fitoor (Urdu: فتور, lit. 'Consumed by Obsession') is a 2021 Pakistani television series, directed by Siraj-ul-Haque and written by Zanjabeel Asim Shah. It was produced by Abdullah Kadwani and Asad Qureshi under their banner 7th Sky Entertainment. It premiered on 14 January 2021 on Geo Entertainment. It stars Faysal Qureshi, Hiba Bukhari, Wahaj Ali and Kiran Haq in lead roles.

Fitoor narrates the story of four people whose future is connected by their past. It is a love story that transcends all, as a person in love is bound to forget about the worries of the past and the uncertainty of the future.

The drama was mixed-received by the audience in Pakistan and overseas though it remained the slot leader during its entire run and achieved a high number of views on YouTube.

== Plot ==
Hamza Sadiq (Wahaj Ali) and Dilnasheen Ahmer (Hiba Bukhari) are in love with each other. Hamza is the son of a rich businessman whereas Dilnasheen is from a middle-class family. Hamza lives with his father Sadiq, mother Kulsoom and sister Rida. Whereas, Dilnasheen lives with her mother Aneesa, brother Yawar and his wife Afia. Rida is best friend of Dilnasheen who plays messenger between her and Hamza. On the other hand, Haider Salman (Faysal Quraishi), is a rich middle-aged architecture, who is unmarried. In his youth, he was in love with his paternal cousin Mehmal (Kiran Haq). However, she was a materialistic woman and left him because he wasn't rich back then and rather married her rich maternal cousin Ansab Jahangir. However, he doesn't love her and has affairs with multiple girls. Due to his bad behaviour with her Mehmal keep visiting Haider. She wishes to get him back as he is rich now. Haider's mother Bushra and sister Sara convince him to marry and move on from Mehmal's bitter memories but he avoids the topic always. Bushra takes Haider to wedding function of Afsheen, sister of Sara's husband Asim. Dilnasheen, also attends this wedding as Afia is sister of Afsheen and Asim. At the wedding, Dilnasheen and Haider gets lock in a room and in all that chaos, he is attracted to her. Haider tells Bushra that he wants to marry Dilnasheen and she and Sara send arranged marriage proposal for Dilnasheen to her family. They all got happy with the proposal. Upon learning about the proposal, Dilnasheen informs this to Hamza. Aneesa overhears her talking to Hamza on phone and berates her. Kulsoom rejects Dilnasheen as she is poor and Sadiq support her decision. Hamza and Rida try to convince them but fails. Then, Hamza leaves home and his parents go to Dilnasheen's home and humiliate her. Due to this, Aneesa and Yawar hate her. She is forced to say yes for Haider's proposal. Then, Dilnasheen gets engaged to Haider. And thus, Aneesa and Yawar forgive her. On the other hand, Hamza attempts suicide but is saved. Due to this attempt, his parents agree for his marriage with Dilnasheen. Sadiq and Rida go to Dilnasheen's home to apologise to her family and ask her hand for Hamza but it was too late because her pre wedding ceremony were going on. Aneesa and Yawar reject Sadiq's request of giving Dilnasheen's hand for Hamza. Haider and Dilnasheen get married and Hamza witnesses it, which leaves him heartbroken. Aneesa warns Dilnasheen to never ever reveal about her past to Haider to keep her marriage intact. Hamza goes abroad for studies. Haider and Dilnasheen start loving each other. Meanwhile, Mehmal leaves Ansab and comes at Haider's home with her daughter Eshal. She plans to enter back in Haider's life by getting closer to him making Dilnasheen insecure. Bushra who already dislike Mehmal, want to save the relationship of Haider and Dilnasheen and hence supports her. Mehmal learns about Dilnasheen and Hamza's relationship in the past through Rida (who now hates Dilnasheen). Mehmal threatens and blackmails Dilnasheen to leave Haider or else she will expose her past in front of him. Mehmal eventually reveals about Dilnasheen's past to Haider and Bushra along with photos as proof. However, Dilnasheen denies Mehmal's allegations and also claims those photos to be photoshopped. Haider and Bushra trusts her but he still have doubts. Hamza returns to Pakistan, upon Sadiq's death in a plane crash. He has become a drug addict to cope up with his heartbreak and also has left his studies. Mehmal meets Hamza and instigate him to get Dilnasheen back and befriended him. Hamza use various antics for getting her back which creates problem in Dilnasheen and Haider's married life and also make Bushra against Dilnasheen. Later, he apologise for what he did and cleans Dilnahseen's image in front of Haider and Bushra. He backs off from pursuing Dilnasheen and warns Mehmal against harming her. Out of provocations by Haider's allegations and his closeness with Mehmal, Dilnasheen start contacting and meeting Hamza and they decides to be together. She also reveals this to Haider and ask for divorce. Their relationship get strained. Bushra is diagnosed with brain tumour and has very less time left to live. Haider request Dilnasheen to pretend that they have a happy marriage in front of Bushra so she is happy in her last days. Due to this pretendence, Dilnasheen starts avoiding Hamza. Mehmal accepts her defeat and becomes good. Dilnasheen gets pregnant with Haider's child. Ansab apologise to Mehmal and they reconcile. He takes her and Eshal back home. Dilnasheen realises that Haider loves her and not Mehmal. She fees guilty of all her doings. She meets Hamza to end things with him and also reveals about her pregnancy making him furious. They meet with an accident and are admitted in hospital. Dilnasheen suffers miscarriage. Her relationship with Hamza is revealed in front of All family members and they abandon her. A heartbroken and enraged Hamza, announces his wish to marry Afsiya, daughter of Kulsoom's brother Haroon. They immediately get married. Dilnasheen discharges from hospital and go to Haider's home, he fights with her and tells her to leave but she doesn't. Then, Bushra asks Haider to forgive Dilnasheen just like her husband had forgiven her for her past relationship. Sara expels Dilnasheen from home. Then, Haider confronts Dilnasheen and forgives her. They eventually reconcile and mend their relationship.

== Cast ==
=== Main ===
- Faysal Qureshi as Haider Salman : Bushra and Salman's son; Sara's brother; Mehmal's paternal cousin and ex lover; Dilnasheen's husband.
- Wahaj Ali as Hamza Sadiq : Sadiq and Kulsoom's son; Rida's brother; Dilnasheen's ex lover; Afsiya's fraternal cousin and husband.
- Hiba Bukhari as Dilnasheen Haider : Aneesa and Ahmer's daughter; Yawar's sister; Hamza's ex lover; Haider's wife.
- Kiran Haq as Mehmal Ansab : Haider's paternal cousin and ex lover; Ansab's fraternal cousin and wife; Eshal's mother.

=== Supporting ===
- Ismat Zaidi as Bushra Salman: Salman's widow; Haider and Sara's mother.
- Saba Hameed as Aneesa Ahmer: Ahmer's widow; Dilnasheen and Yawar's mother.
- Fahima Awan as Sara Asim : Bushra and Salman's daughter; Haider's sister; Asim's wife.
- Farhan Ally Agha as Asim : Sara's husband; Afia and Afsheen's brother.
- Tanveer Jamal as Sadiq Ameen : Rida and Hamza's father; Kulsoom's husband. (Dead)
- Annie Zaidi as Kulsoom Sadiq : Sadiq's wife; Hamza and Rida's mother; Haroon's sister.
- Kamran Jeelani as Yawar Ahmer : Ahmer and Aneesa's son; Dilnasheen's brother; Afia's husband.
- Mizna Waqas as Afia Yawar : Yawar's wife; Asim and Afsheen's sister.
- Zohreh Amir as Rida Sadiq : Sadiq and Kulsoom's daughter; Hamza's sister.
- Tipu Sharif as Ansab Jahangir : Mehmal's maternal cousin and husband; Eshal's father.
- Saife Hassan as Haroon : Kulsoom's brother; Afsiya's father.
- Kanwal Khan as Afsiya Haroon : Haroon's daughter; Hamza's maternal cousin wife.
- Aayat Arif as Eshal Ansab : Mehmal and Ansab's daughter.

== Production ==
=== Casting ===
In the last quarter of 2020, it was reported that Faysal Qureshi, Hiba Bukhari, Wahaj Ali and Kiran Haq had been cast as lead characters for a 7th Sky project. The project reunited Faysal Qureshi with Bashar Momin writer Zanjabeel Asim. It marked the third collaboration between Faysal Qureshi and 7th Sky production, with the other two being Muqaddar and Meri Zaat Zarra-e-Benishan. The serial also marked the second collaboration of the trio director Siraj-ul-Haque, Kiran Haq, and Hiba Bukhari after their serial Ramz-e-Ishq, whereas it was the first time Wahaj appeared in a project of 7th Sky production.

=== Filming ===
The shooting of the serial took place in Karachi during late 2020 and early 2021.

== Reception ==
A reviewer from The News International called out the series for fighting and trivialising the problematic themes such as infidelity, power imbalance, and false accusations. DAWN Images listed it among the toxic love stories of television.

== Soundtrack ==
"Koi Aisa Dard"

Song by Shani Arshad and Aima Baig
- Language: Urdu
- Released: 23 February 2021
- Length: 5:58
- Label: 7th Sky Entertainment
- Songwriter: Zanjabeel Asim
- Composer: Shani Arshad
- Lyricist: Sabir Zafar
- Producer: Abdullah Kadwani
External media
Audio
- Male version on YouTube
- Female version on YouTube
Video
- Duet music video on YouTube
- Cover by Aayat Arif on YouTube

The original soundtrack of Fitoor "Koi Aisa Dard" was sung and composed by Shani Arshad, and Aima Baig lent her voice for female vocals. The OST was released on 23 February 2021, on TV as well as digitally on YouTube, and, as of March 2022, has more than 35 million views on YouTube.

== Accolades ==
=== Lux Style Awards ===
Ceremony	Categories	Recipients	Results
21st Lux Style Awards	Best TV Play	Fitoor	Nominated
21st Lux Style Awards	Best TV Track	Shani Arshad & Aima Baig	Nominated
