= Arez Ahmed =

Pakistani actor and model

- سید عاریز احمد; सैयद आरिज़ अहमद
- Born: Syed Arez Ahmed; 7 November 1991 (age 35); Karachi, Sindh, Pakistan
- Education: Institute of Business Management, University of Karachi (B.S.)
- Occupations: Actor; Model
- Years active: 2016–present
- Spouse: Hiba Bukhari (m. 2022)

Syed Arez Ahmed (born 7 November 1991) is a Pakistani actor and model. He is known for his roles in Mehar Posh, Kahin Deep Jaley, Mera Rab Waris, Mohabbat Daagh Ki Soorat, Uraan, and Bajjo.

== Early life and education ==
Arez was born on 7 November 1991 in Karachi, Pakistan. He comes from a family of professionals, including 18 doctors. He completed his studies from University of Karachi, graduating with Bachelors in Maritime Studies. Later he studied at the Institute of Business Management. During his university days he acted in some plays.

He served in the Merchant Navy before joining NAPA to pursue theatre intensively for some two years.

== Career ==
In 2016, he made his debut in drama Maikay Ki Yaad Na Aaye as Subhan and appeared in 2017 in Bholi Bano as Soban.

He was noted for his roles in dramas Hina Ki Khushboo, Sodai, Tum Se Hi Talluq Hai and Piya Naam Ka Diya. He also appeared in dramas Shahrukh Ki Saliyan, Mera Rab Waris, Kahin Deep Jaley and Tarap. Since then he has appeared in dramas Uraan, Dil Tanha Tanha and Mehar Posh.

In 2019, he appeared in Senti Aur Mental and in a movie Betabiyan as Zain.

== Personal life ==
On 7 December 2021, he revealed that he will marry his Bholi Bano, Tarap and Inteha e Ishq co-star Hiba Bukhari. They got married in a private Nikah ceremony on 7 January 2022. In December 2024, they announced the birth of their daughter Aynur.

== Filmography ==
=== Television ===
Year	Title	Role	Network	Notes	Ref(s)
2016	Maikay Ki Yaad Na Aaye	Subhan	Geo Entertainment	Debut	
2017	Bholi Bano	Soban	Geo Entertainment		
2017	Hina Ki Khushboo	Azlan	Geo Entertainment		
2018	Sodai	Haroon	Express Entertainment		
2018	Seerat	Sumair	Geo Entertainment		
2018	Khatakaar	Arsal	Express Entertainment		
2018	Tum Se Hi Talluq Hai	Ashir	Geo Entertainment		
2019	Piya Naam Ka Diya	Shayaan	Geo Entertainment		
2019	Shahrukh Ki Saliyan	Abu Bakr	Geo Entertainment		
2019	Mera Rab Waris	Hashir	Geo Entertainment		
2019	Kahin Deep Jaley	Asim	Geo Entertainment		
2020	Dikhawa	Zaid	Geo Entertainment		
2020	Mera Wajood	Babar	Express Entertainment		
2020	Tarap	Faris	Hum TV		
2020	Makafaat Season 2	Sufiyan	Geo Entertainment		
2020	Humraaz	Sheraz	Apna Channel		
2020	Dil Tanha Tanha	Sohail	Hum TV		
2020	Uraan	Waqas	Geo Entertainment		
2020	Mehar Posh	Waqas	Geo Entertainment		
2021	Makafaat Season 3	Ali	Geo Entertainment		
2021	Mazaaq Raat	Himself	Dunya News		
2021	Mohabbat Daagh Ki Soorat	Khalid	Geo Entertainment		
2021	Wafa Be Mol	Shaheer	Hum TV		
2021	Inteha e Ishq	Saim	A-Plus		
2021	Mere Apne	Usama	ARY Digital		
2022	Aitebaar	Asfand	Hum TV		
2022	Roag	Rehan	Hum TV		
2022	Ishq Nahin Aasan	Amir	Aan TV		
2022	Muqaddar Ka Sitara	Faizan	ARY Digital		
2023	Makafaat Season 4	Nadir	Geo Entertainment		
2023	Shanaas	Raamis	Green TV Entertainment		
2023	Qabeel	Tasawar Shah	Aur Life		
2023	Mein Kahani Hun	Burhan	Express Entertainment		
2024	Dao	Asim	Geo Entertainment		
2024	Chand Nagar	Taimoor	BOL Entertainment		
2024	Dua Aur Azan	Murad	Green Entertainment		
2024	Chaal	Rahil	Geo Entertainment		
2024	BOL Kahani	Zain	BOL Network		
2024	Bajjo	Sohail	Geo Entertainment		
2025	Raaja Rani	Junaid	Hum TV		
2025	Baray Bhaiya	Almeer	Geo Entertainment		
2026	Humrahi	Zaviyar	Geo Entertainment		

=== Telefilm ===
Year	Title	Role
2021	Hangor S-131	Lt Allaudin
2022	Dream Villa Ki Confused Love Story	Nayail

=== Film ===
Year	Title	Role
2019	Betabiyan	Zain
TBA	Senti Aur Mental	Groom
