= Birjees Farooqui =

Pakistani actress (born 1965)

- Born: Lahore, Pakistan
- Education: University of Lahore
- Occupations: Actress; Newscaster
- Years active: 1988 – present
- Children: 3

Birjees Farooqui is a Pakistani actress and former newscaster. She is known for her roles in the dramas Tumhare Hain, Bandish, Kasa-e-Dil, Muqaddar and Darr Khuda Say.

== Early life ==
Farooqui was born in Lahore, Pakistan. She completed her studies from University of Lahore.

== Career ==
Farooqui started working as an newscaster on PTV and later in commercials. She was noted for her roles in dramas Ishq Parast, Shukk, Takkabur, Tere Baghair, Dil Tere Naam and Pyarey Afzal. She appeared in dramas Bad Gumaan, Be Aitbaar, Dil-e-Beqarar, Hiddat, Yaar-e-Bewafa and Tumhare Hain. She has also appeared in dramas Saiyaan Way, Bandish, Darr Khuda Say, Ghar Titli Ka Par, Kasa-e-Dil, Muqaddar and Ehraam-e-Junoon.

== Personal life ==
Farooqui's husband died a few years after their marriage. The couple have three children, a daughter and two sons.

== Filmography ==
=== Television ===
Year	Title	Role	Network
2013	Humnasheen	Abida	Hum TV
2013	Mann Ke Moti	Rahat	Geo TV
2013	Khoya Khoya Chand	Nazo	Hum TV
2013	Shukk	Sania's mother	ARY Digital
2013	Aasmanon Pay Likha	Aapa	Geo TV
2013	Pyarey Afzal	Mehtab's mother	ARY Digital
2014	Nazdeekiyan	Salma	ARY Digital
2014	Hum Tehray Gunahgaar	Ammi Ji	Hum TV
2014	Rasam	Shehzad's mother	Geo TV
2014	Khata	Rehan's mother	ARY Digital
2014	Kissey Apna Kahein	Amma Jan	Hum TV
2014	Mein Bushra	Sania's mother	ARY Digital
2014	Khuda Na Karay	Babar's mother	ARY Digital
2014	Malika-e-Aliya	Malika's aunt	Geo TV
2014	Janay Kyun	Sundus	ARY Digital
2014	Jab We Wed	Amma Ji	Urdu 1
2014	Sadqay Tumhare	Samina	Hum TV
2015	Shert	Aapa Jan	Urdu 1
2015	Mujhe Qabool Hai	Raila	ARY Digital
2015	Ishq Parast	Hamza's mother	ARY Digital
2015	Murada Mai	Akila	Urdu 1
2015	Naraz	Fariha's mother	ARY Digital
2015	Piya Mann Bhaye	Aliya	Geo Entertainment
2015	Tum Mere Paas Raho	Salma	Hum TV
2015	Takkabur	Tayyaba	A-Plus
2015	Tere Baghair	Madiha	Hum TV
2015	Shukrana	Tahira	Express Entertainment
2015	Dil Tere Naam	Sania	Urdu 1
2016	Be Aitbaar	Shagufta	Hum TV
2016	Main Kaisy Kahun	Roaid's mother	Urdu 1
2016	Bad Gumaan	Jibran's wife	Hum TV
2016	Rishta Anjana Sa	Saira's mother	ARY Digital
2016	Dil-e-Beqarar	Salma Abbas	Hum TV
2016	Khuda Gawah	Shehroz's mother	TV One
2017	Naseboon Jali Nargis	Sabiha	Express Entertainment
2017	Tumhare Hain	Sameera	ARY Digital
2017	Hiddat	Farhad's mother	Geo Entertainment
2017	Shadi Mubarak Ho	Zobia	ARY Digital
2017	Apnay Paraye	Aliya's mother	Express Entertainment
2017	Yaar-e-Bewafa	Mrs. Kamal	Geo Entertainment
2017	Ghar Titli Ka Par	Simi	Geo Entertainment
2018	Saiyaan Way	Wahaj's mother	TV One
2018	Sodai	Rabia	Express Entertainment
2018	Thays	Shayan's mother	A-Plus
2018	Meri Baji	Aiman's mother	ARY Digital
2018	Haara Dil	Faraz's mother	A-Plus
2018	Hum Usi Kay Hain	Maha's mother	BOL Entertainment
2018	Woh Mera Dil Tha	Zoya	ARY Digital
2019	Bandish	Majida	ARY Digital
2019	Darr Khuda Say	Tahira	Geo TV
2019	Cheekh	Asad's mother	ARY Digital
2020	Aik Aur Munafiq	Mahjabeen	Geo Entertainment
2020	Dikhawa Season 1	Rukhsana	Geo Entertainment
2020	Muqaddar	Roshan	Geo Entertainment
2020	Ghamandi	Ayesha	Express Entertainment
2020	Bandhay Aik Dor Say	Jahangir's wife	Geo Entertainment
2020	Kasa-e-Dil	Shaista	Geo Entertainment
2021	Makafaat Season 3	Adeel's mother	Geo Entertainment
2021	Qayamat	Amma	Geo Entertainment
2021	Mohabbat Daagh Ki Surat	Rabab's mother	Geo Entertainment
2021	Berukhi	Saima	ARY Digital
2021	Mein Hari Piya	Bilal's mother	ARY Digital
2021	Banno	Sadia's mother	Geo Entertainment
2021	Baddua	Afshan	ARY Digital
2022	Unchahee	Amber	Aaj Entertainment
2022	Inteqam	Tehmina	Geo TV
2022	Makafaat Season 4	Rania's mother	Geo TV
2022	Mamlaat	Maham	Geo TV
2022	Nisa	Mehreen's mother	Geo TV
2022	Dikhawa Season 3	Jahangir's mother	Geo TV
2022	Dil Zaar Zaar	Fazeelat	Geo TV
2022	Badzaat	Fariha Begum	Geo TV
2022	Meray Humnasheen	Taniya's mother	Geo TV
2022	Dil-e-Veeran	Shehzad's mother	ARY Digital
2022	Zakham	Nazish's mother	Geo Entertainment
2022	Pehchaan	Kehkeshan's mother	Hum TV
2022	Siyani	Yawar's mother	Geo TV
2022	Guddu	Sharmeen's mother	Geo TV
2022	Woh Pagal Si	Rumi's mother	ARY Digital
2022	Habs	Fehmida	ARY Digital
2023	Makafaat Season 5	Jameela	Geo Entertainment
2023	Nikah	Mrs. Azhar	Geo Entertainment
2023	Dikhawa Season 4	Dolly's mother	Geo Entertainment
2023	Tere Aany Se	Salik's mother	Geo Entertainment
2023	Mein Kahani Hun	Almas	Express Entertainment
2023	Ehraam-e-Junoon	Farzana	Geo Entertainment
2023	Mujhay Qabool Nahin	Wasay's mother	Geo Entertainment
2023	Jaisay Aapki Marzi	Natalia's mother	ARY Digital
2023	Khumar	Salma	Geo Entertainment
2023	Jaan-e-Jahan	Maham	ARY Digital
2024	Suhana	Mrs. Taimoor	Aur Life
2024	Burns Road Kay Romeo Juliet	Sarmad's mother	ARY Digital
2024	Umm-e-Ayesha	Ashar's mother	Geo Entertainment
2024	Dao	Khurram's mother	Geo Entertainment
2024	Bismil	Moosa's aunt	ARY Digital
2025	Ae Dil	Zahida Begum	ARY Digital
2025	Raaja Rani	Ameera	Hum TV
2025	Rasm-e-Wafa	Rabia	ARY Digital
2025	Madawa	Farah	ARY Digital

=== Web series ===
Year	Title	Role	Network
2025	Hashtag	Mrs. Raees	Geo TV
