= Humrahi (TV series) =

2026 Pakistani television series

- Genre: Romance; Action
- Written by: Zanjabeel Asim Shah
- Directed by: Babar Javed
- Starring: Danish Taimoor; Hiba Bukhari
- Country of origin: Pakistan
- Original language: Urdu
- No. of episodes: 41

Production
- Producer: Babar Javed
- Production locations: Karachi, Pakistan
- Camera setup: Multi-camera setup
- Running time: 40 minutes
- Production company: BJ Production

Original release
- Network: Geo Entertainment
- Release: March 27 – August 15, 2026

Humrahi is a 2026 Pakistani romantic action drama series that premiered on Geo Entertainment on 27 March 2026. The series is directed and produced by Babar Javed. The series stars Danish Taimoor and Hiba Bukhari alongside Shahzad Nawaz, Hajra Yamin, Azfar Rehman, and Salma Zafar.

== Plot ==
Sayhaan Ghazi (Danish Taimoor), the son of influential businessman Ghazi Yousuf (Shahzad Nawaz), meets Dr Elif (Hiba Bukhari), the daughter of restaurant owner Mariyam (Laila Wasti). Their first encounter is unpleasant, and their relationship initially develops through disagreements. Matters become more complicated when Ghazi Yousuf attempts to acquire Mariyam's restaurant. Despite their differences, Sayhaan gradually becomes supportive of Elif and her family. Following Mariyam's death, Elif decides to donate her heart after her death so that it can be transplanted into someone in need. Sayhaan supports her through her grief, and their relationship eventually develops into love.

Sayhaan and Elif decide to marry despite Ghazi Yousuf's opposition. On their wedding day, Sayhaan gets into a heated argument with his father. The confrontation leaves him distressed, and his health suddenly deteriorates, preventing him from reaching the wedding venue. He is rushed to hospital, where medical examinations reveal to Ghazi and Elif that he has a critical heart condition requiring a transplant. His rare blood group makes finding a compatible donor extremely difficult. Coincidentally, Elif has the same blood group but Ghazi did not knew. Upon learning about his son's condition, Ghazi agrees to their marriage. However, the seriousness of Sayhaan's illness is concealed from him, and he marries Elif without knowing the full extent of his condition.

After their marriage, Sayhaan discovers the severity of his illness and learns that his survival depends on a heart transplant for which finding a suitable donor is extremely difficult. Realising the uncertainty surrounding his future, Sayhaan decides to divorce Elif to spare her from the difficulties of remaining with him. He takes her to her family home and prepares to leave permanently. Before he reaches his car, Elif reminds him of his promise never to abandon her and asks him not to leave. Moved by her love and request, Sayhaan changes his mind and returns to her. The two subsequently return to his house and continue their life together.

As Sayhaan's condition deteriorates, Elif becomes increasingly determined to save him. Remembering her earlier decision to donate her heart after death, she believes that her death could provide the organ needed for Sayhaan's transplant. On the other hand, Ghazi came to know that Elif has the same rare blood group and decided to kill her. Elif writes a suicide note and leaves it in Ghazi's room. However, Ghazi unexpectedly confronts her without initially noticing the letter and without knowing her intentions of suicide. He kills Elif so that her heart can be transplanted into his son. Sayhaan survives following the transplant, but he is initially given a misleading account of the circumstances surrounding Elif's death.

Unable to accept the explanation, Sayhaan begins investigating Elif's death with the assistance of Aurangzeb (Azfar Rahman). Meanwhile, Elif's twin sister, Ilham (also played by Hiba Bukhari), arrives from Istanbul to discover the truth about her sister's death. She initially suspects Sayhaan of being responsible but gradually realises that he was also deceived. The investigation eventually exposes Ghazi's involvement in Elif's murder, destroying Sayhaan's trust in his father. Overwhelmed by grief and betrayal, Sayhaan leaves his former life behind and finds refuge in the mountains, where he meets Raniya (Hajra Yamin) and her brother Wazir.

As the story progresses, Sayhaan becomes involved in the siblings' difficulties and attempts to protect them from their adversaries. He also becomes entangled in disputes involving Elif's family's restaurant and people associated with Lala (Ayub Khosa). During an altercation, Sayhaan accidentally kills Waleed Khan while defending himself, intensifying the conflict with those seeking revenge. Meanwhile, Ilham continues her efforts to uncover the truth about her sister's death. Although she and Sayhaan initially have a strained relationship, they gradually develop an emotional connection.

Ghazi eventually admits his responsibility for Elif's murder. Sayhaan is devastated by the confession and breaks away from his father. Ghazi is subsequently murdered, further complicating the family's circumstances. Sayhaan resolves to distance himself from his father's unlawful business dealings and pursue disputes through legal means rather than continuing his family's previous practices. Ilham, who has developed feelings for Sayhaan, initially struggles with their relationship because of the events surrounding Zakariya's death. However, she eventually acknowledges her love for him.

In the concluding episodes, Jibran seeks revenge and abducts Raniya and Wazir. Chanda (Salma Zafar) is also killed during the escalating violence. Sayhaan confronts Jibran to protect those close to him and succeeds in killing him. However, he is fatally wounded during the confrontation and dies in Ilham's arms. The drama concludes with Sayhaan's death, leaving Ilham bereaved.

== Cast ==
- Danish Taimoor as Sayhaan Ghazi
- Hiba Bukhari as (dual role):
  - Elif
  - Ilham
- Shahzad Nawaz as Ghazi Yousuf; Sayhaan's father
- Ayub Khosa as Lala
- Laila Wasti as Mariyam; Elif & Elhaam's mother
- Nida Mumtaz as Suraiyya
- Azfar Rehman as Aurangzeb
- Hajra Yamin as Raniya
- Arez Ahmed as Zaviyar
- Syed Yörgüç Tipu Sharif as Jibran
- Mehboob Sultan as Zakariya
- Adnan Shah Tipu as SI Haider
- Ayan Ahmed as Zorawar
- Salma Zafar as Chanda

== Reception ==
In a review published by DAWN on 7 June 2026, critic Sadaf Haider praised Shahzad Nawaz's portrayal of Ghazi Yusuf and noted a more restrained performance from Danish Taimoor as Sayhaan. She also discussed the rapid progression of the storyline and its developments.

A report published by Minute Mirror on 16 July 2026 documented criticism from viewers concerning the repeated pairing of Taimoor and Bukhari and the perceived repetitiveness of the storyline. The report also highlighted the drama's online viewership.

The final episode was screened at a Nueplex cinemas in Karachi on 15 August 2026. The News International reported that the screening attracted a large audience and was attended by members of the cast and other entertainment industry figures. It's coverage also noted viewers' appreciation of the lead pairing. Jang also reported on the cinema screening, noting the audience turnout and the participation of entertainment personalities.

== Soundtrack ==
Humrahi (Original Score)

Soundtrack album by Muhammad Ali
- Released: 21 March 2026
- Genre: Television soundtrack
- Length: 4:50
- Language: Urdu
- Label: Geo Entertainment
External videos
- Full OST on YouTube

The original soundtrack (OST) of Humrahi was composed by Farrukh Abid and Shoaib Farrukh, with lyrics written by Jameel Ahmed and vocals performed by Muhammad Ali.
