= Danish Taimoor =

Pakistani actor and model (born 1983)

- Born: Karachi, Sindh, Pakistan
- Occupations: Actor; Producer; Host
- Years active: 2005–present
- Known for: Ab Dekh Khuda Kya Karta Hai (2018); Deewangi (2019); Ishq Hai (2021); Kaisi Teri Khudgarzi (2022)
- Spouse: Ayeza Khan (m. 2014)
- Children: 2

Danish Taimoor is a Pakistani actor, producer, host and former fashion model. He is known for his work in Urdu television and films. Taimoor's accolades include a Lux Style Awards, Hum Awards and ARY Film Awards, alongside four Lux Style Awards nominations.

== Early life ==
Danish Taimoor was born in Karachi and has an MBA degree from Karachi University.

== Career ==
=== Actor ===
Taimoor was a fashion model before becoming an actor.

He began his acting career on television in 2005 with the horror drama Mystery Series, featuring in two episodes, Do Saal Baad and Dracula, which were aired on Indus Vision.

He made his film debut with Yasir Jaswal's thriller Jalaibee in 2015.

=== Producer ===
In 2016, Taimoor produced the drama Shehrnaz, starring his wife Ayeza and Imran Ashraf.

=== Host ===
In 2019, Taimoor began hosting the game show Aisay Chalay Ga on Bol Entertainment.

== Personal life ==
On 8 August 2014, he married actress Ayeza Khan. They have two children.

== Filmography ==
=== Film ===
Year	Title	Role	Notes	Ref.
2015	Jalaibee	Billu		
2015	Wrong No.	Salman "Sallu" / Shehryar	Dual role	
2016	Teri Meri Love Story	Zaid	Telefilm	
2017	Mehrunisa V Lub U	Ali		
2018	Wujood	Faizan		
2019	Sirf Tum Hi To Ho	Noor		

=== Television ===
Year	Title	Role	Notes	Ref.
2008	Chaudhween Ka Chand	Taimoor		
2009	Veena	Najam		
2009	Mannchalay	Jibran		
2010	Chemistry	Raamis		
2010	Larkiyan Mohallay Ki			
2011	Rok Lo Aaj Ki Raat Ko	Ali Sher		
2011	Meri Behan Maya	Faizar		
2011	Kaash Main Teri Beti Na Hoti	Junaid Ali Shah		
2011	Kitni Girhain Baqi Hain	Various	Episodic appearance	
2012	Raju Rocket	Raju Rocket		
2013	Rehaai	Akmal		
2013	Sannata	Azam		
2014	Hum Tehray Gunahgaar	Ali		
2014	Kissey Apna Kahein	Ali		
2014	Maang	Asad		
2014	Saari Bhool Hamari Thi			
2014	Jab We Wed	Faris		
2015	Shert	Imaad		
2018	Haara Dil	Arham		
2018	Ru Baru Ishq Tha	Almeer		
2018	Ab Dekh Khuda Kya Karta Hai	Jaan-e-Alam		
2019	Mera Rab Waris	Haris		
2019	Janbaaz	ASP Jasim Tahir		
2019	Deewangi	Sultan Durrani		
2020	Mehar Posh	Shah Jahan		
2021	Ishq Hai	Shahzaib		
2022	Kaisi Teri Khudgarzi	Shamsher Khan		
2023	Chand Tara	Sarim		
2023	Rah-e-Junoon	Shabrez		
2024	Jaan Nisar	Nosherwan		
2024	Teri Chhaon Mein	Salaar		
2025	Mann Mast Malang	Kabir Khan		
2025	Sher	Sher Zaman		
2026	Humrahi	Sayhaan Ghazi		
2026	Nashtar	Shah Dawood		

=== Other work ===
Year	Title	Role	Notes	Ref.
2016	Shehrnaz	Producer		
2025-2026	Mehfil e Ramzan	Host		

== Awards and nominations ==
Year	Award	Category	Project	Result	Ref(s)
2013	1st Hum Awards	Best Soap Actor	Raju Rocket	Nominated	
2014	2nd Hum Awards	Best Supporting Actor	Rehaai	Nominated	
2015	3rd Hum Awards	Best Soap Actor	Hum Tehray Gunahgaar	Won	
2016	2nd ARY Film Awards	Best Star Debut Male	Jalaibee	Won	
2016	2nd ARY Film Awards	Best Actor	Wrong No.	Nominated	
2016	15th Lux Style Awards	Best Lead Actor in a Film	Wrong No.	Nominated	
2021	20th Lux Style Awards	Best Television Actor (Viewers' Choice)	Deewangi	Won	
2021	2nd Pakistan International Screen Awards	Best TV Actor (Popular)	Deewangi	Nominated	
2022	21st Lux Style Awards	Best Television Actor (Viewers' Choice)	Ishq Hai	Nominated	
2023	22nd Lux Style Awards	Best Television Actor (Viewers' Choice)	Kaisi Teri Khudgarzi	Nominated	
2025	24th Lux Style Awards	Actor of the Year - Male	Jaan Nisar	Nominated	
2026	3rd Pakistan International Screen Awards	Best On-screen Couple (with Hiba Qadir)	Jaan Nisar	Nominated	
