= Tarap (TV series) =

2020 Pakistani romantic drama television series

- Official title card
- تڑپ
- Genre: Action; Drama; Romance; Serial drama
- Written by: Misbah Syed
- Directed by: Nadeem Siddique
- Starring: Syed Jibran; Hiba Qadir; Beenish Chohan
- Country of origin: Pakistan
- Original language: Urdu
- No. of seasons: 1
- No. of episodes: 32

Production
- Producers: Babar Javed; MD Productions
- Cinematography: Wajid Raza
- Camera setup: Multi-camera setup
- Running time: approx. 35-40 minutes
- Production company: MD Productions

Original release
- Network: Hum TV
- Release: 29 March – 25 October 2020

Tarap (Urdu: تڑپ, lit. 'Yearning') is a 2020 Pakistani drama television series that premiered on Hum TV on 29 March 2020. It is produced by Babar Javed and MD Productions and directed by Nadeem Siddiqui. It features Syed Jibran and Hiba Bukhari in lead roles. The supporting cast includes Babar Ali, Waseem Abbas, Nausheen Shah, and Saleem Mairaj. Tarap is a story of hardship, sacrifice, and love, which shapes the characters and plot. The drama initially aired every Sunday at 9:10 pm, then in Ramadan aired every Saturday and Sunday night at 9:10 pm, returning to its once-a-week schedule after Ramadan.

== Cast ==
- Syed Jibran as Adil
- Hiba Bukhari as Zunaira
- Babar Ali as Laeeq
- Laiba Khan as Hania
- Nausheen Shah as Faiqa
- Faiza Gillani as Rabia (Adil's ex-wife)
- Beenish Chohan as Nida (Adil's second wife)
- Lubna Aslam as Sadia
- Jahanzeb Khan as Sameer
- Saleem Mairaj as Arshad Hussain
- Beena Masroor as Zunaira's grandmother
- Farah Nadir as Zunaira Aapa
- Ghazala Butt as Rabia's mother
- Farah Nadeem as Salma
- Sajiruddin
- Akbar Subhani
- Arez Ahmed as Faris

== Episodes ==
No.	Title	Directed by	Written by	Original release date
1	"Tarap Episode #01"	Misbah Syed	Nadeem Siddique	March 29, 2020
Episodic reference:
2	"Tarap Episode #02"	Misbah Syed	Nadeem Siddique	April 5, 2020
Episodic reference:
3	"Tarap Episode #03"	Misbah Syed	Nadeem Siddique	April 12, 2020
Episodic reference:
4	"Tarap Episode #04"	Misbah Syed	Nadeem Siddique	April 19, 2020
Episodic reference:
5	"Tarap Episode #05"	Misbah Syed	Nadeem Siddique	April 25, 2020
Episodic reference:
6	"Tarap Episode #06"	Misbah Syed	Nadeem Siddique	April 26, 2020
Episodic reference:
7	"Tarap Episode #07"	Misbah Syed	Nadeem Siddique	May 2, 2020
Episodic reference:
8	"Tarap Episode #08"	Misbah Syed	Nadeem Siddique	May 3, 2020
Episodic reference:
9	"Tarap Episode #09"	Misbah Syed	Nadeem Siddique	May 9, 2020
Episodic reference:
10	"Tarap Episode #10"	Misbah Syed	Nadeem Siddique	May 10, 2020
Episodic reference:
11	"Tarap Episode #11"	Misbah Syed	Nadeem Siddique	May 16, 2020
Episodic reference:
12	"Tarap Episode #12"	Misbah Syed	Nadeem Siddique	May 17, 2020
Episodic reference:

== Soundtrack ==
Tarap

Soundtrack album by Denis Tanveer
- Released: 24 March 2020
- Recorded: 2020
- Genre: Television soundtrack
- Length: 3:11
- Language: Urdu
- Label: Hum TV

Music video
- "OST: Tarap" on YouTube

The original soundtrack is composed by Denis Tanveer with lyrics written and performed by Khurram Iqbal.
