= Ishq Parast =

2015 Pakistani television series

- Genre: Revenge, Drama
- Created by: Big Bang Entertainment
- Written by: Mohsin Ali
- Directed by: Badar Mehmood
- Starring: Syed Jibran; Armeena Khan; Arij Fatyma; Shaheen Khan; Birjees Farooqui
- Opening theme: Ishq Hai Tu Mera Khwab Hai
- Ending theme: Ishq Hai Tu Mera Khwab Hai
- Country of origin: Pakistan
- Original language: Urdu
- No. of seasons: 1

Production
- Producer: Big Bang Entertainment
- Production location: Pakistan
- Running time: (36-40 minutes of airing)

Original release
- Network: ARY Digital
- Release: 19 February – 23 July 2015

Ishq Parast is a Pakistani television drama series, aired on ARY Digital from 19 February 2015 to 23 July 2015. It is written by Mohsin Ali, produced by Big Bang Entertainment, and directed by Badar Mehmood. It aimed in the prime slot of 9:00 p.m. every Thursday on ARY Digital. It stars Armeena Rana Khan, Syed Jibran and Arij Fatyma in leading roles.

== Cast ==
Actor	Role
Syed Jibran	Zohaib Ahmad
Arij Fatyma	Arsala
Armeena Khan	Dua Pasha
Ahmed Ali	Hamza
Waseem Abbas	Saif Mushtaq Pasha, Dua's father
Saba Faisal	Khadija, Dua's mother
Shaheen Khan	Zohaib and Arsala's aunt
Birjees Farooqui	Hamza's mother
Muhammad Haneef	Hamza's father
Majid Khan	Hamza's friend

== Plot ==
Ishq Parast is a story that revolves around Dua, a young and beautiful girl who has her own dreams and desires when it comes to love and life. However, she comes from a traditional middle-class background where arranged marriages are the norm. Despite this, Dua falls in love with Hamza, a passionate but impulsive man from a broken family.

Zohaib, Dua's loving brother, supports her and wants her happiness above all else. Arsala, Dua's niece, is mischievous and adores her brother Zohaib, wishing for him to marry someone immediately. Zohaib and Arsala spot Dua in a shopping mall and are captivated by her. They manage to obtain her contact information through Dua's friend.

Zohaib proposes to Dua, but her father refuses to consider Hamza as a potential suitor. Dua, however, is determined to marry Hamza and rejects any other proposal. Her parents emotionally manipulate and pressure her into accepting Zohaib's proposal, despite her love for Hamza. Hamza, unaware of the situation, is in Islamabad searching for a job.

Feeling torn between her love for Hamza and her parents' wishes, Dua tries desperately to contact Hamza and convince her parents. However, her phone is confiscated by her father, and Hamza assumes she is upset with him for not answering her calls. Dua's father stages a heart attack to guilt-trip her, and feeling guilty, she agrees to marry Zohaib.

On their wedding night, Dua reveals everything to Zohaib, and the next day, it's clear she feels uncomfortable in her new life. However, Zohaib acts as if everything is normal, fooling everyone into believing they are happily married. Arsala explains to Dua that their small family is closely bonded, and her brother Zohaib is a wonderful person.

Meanwhile, Hamza leaves his job and returns to find out the truth about Dua's marriage. Despite his friend's efforts to calm him down and protect Dua, Dua's own friend informs Hamza about the deception. Hamza learns that Dua was tricked into marrying Zohaib and discovers their honeymoon location.

During the honeymoon, Hamza frightens Dua by appearing like a ghost. Furious about Dua's marriage, Hamza tries to force her to divorce Zohaib, but she refuses due to her growing feelings for Zohaib. In an act of revenge, Hamza marries Dua's sister-in-law, Arsala, who adores him. Hamza becomes a "gharjamai" (living with his wife's family), and tensions escalate.

When a car accident lands everyone in the hospital, Hamza takes advantage of the situation and crosses boundaries with Dua. She becomes pregnant, and Arsala leaves the house due to family issues. Hamza reveals the truth to Dua's father, who dies of a heart attack upon hearing the news.

Zohaib and his aunt learn about the situation and worry about Arsala. Hamza loses his job and faces the consequences of his actions. Zohaib confronts Hamza and gives him divorce papers. Arsala, upon discovering the truth, severs all ties with Zohaib and Dua. Devastated by the revelations, she drives recklessly, causing a fatal accident that claims her and Hamza's lives.

The drama concludes with Zohaib's daughter visiting Arsala's grave and commemorating her sixth death anniversary.

== Reception ==
Ishq Parast was the most watched show of 2015. Arij Fatyma was admired for her superb performance.
