= Saiyaan Way =

Pakistani television series

- Genre: Drama
- Written by: Dilshad Naseem
- Directed by: Mehfooz Alam Qureshi
- Country of origin: Pakistan
- Original language: Urdu
- No. of seasons: 2
- No. of episodes: 87

Production
- Producers: Adnan Siddiqui & Akhter Hasnain
- Running time: 35 minutes

Original release
- Release: 26 March 2018 – 2018

Saiyaan Way is a Pakistani TV drama. This drama is written by Samina Nazeer, produced and directed by Barkat Sidiki. It originally aired on TV One Pakistan.

== Plot ==
Qirat, Amber, and Zobiya are loving sisters living with their father in a modest neighbourhood. But a grave crisis occurs when the villainous Arbaz starts blackmailing the young Zobiya. Then Qirat takes a tough decision that shatters the peace of their happy home. The lively Shahvez who adores Qirat supports her while his more serious cousin Wahaj keeps silent about his love for her.

Now Arbaz has returned to take revenge - and Wahaj will have to declare his feelings.

== Cast ==
- Kiran Tabeir
- Rida Ali
- Imran Patel
- Tabbasum Arif as Maria's mother
- Adil Murad as Shahvez
- Inaya Sheikh
- Birjees Farooqui as Salma (Wahaj's mother)
- Farhad Fareed
- Hafsa Butt

== International release ==
The series is available for streaming under the title "Web of Deceit" on Hilal Play.
