= Mehfil e Ramzan =

2025 Pakistani television series

- محفلِ رمضان
- Presented by: Danish Taimoor; Rabia Anum
- Country of origin: Pakistan
- Original language: Urdu
- No. of seasons: 2

Production
- Production location: Karachi
- Camera setup: Multiple-camera setup
- Running time: 152 Minutes

Original release
- Network: Green Entertainment
- Release: March 1, 2025

Mehfil-e-Ramzan is a Pakistani Ramadan television series broadcast by Green Entertainment. The programme features religious discussions, Islamic teachings and guest appearances. It has been hosted by Danish Taimoor and Rabia Anum.

== Format ==
The series features discussions about religious and social matters, with guests including religious scholars and public figures. Its format also includes conversations with viewers and special segments during Ramadan.

== Hosts ==
The programme has been hosted by actor Danish Taimoor and television presenter Rabia Anum. During a March 2025 episode, actress Ayeza Khan appeared as a guest. A discussion about polygamy between Taimoor and his co-host during the episode attracted public criticism. Taimoor subsequently issued an apology, saying that his choice of words had been poor and that he had not intended to disrespect his wife.

== Broadcast ==
The programme was broadcast by Green Entertainment during Ramadan in 2025 and returned in 2026. The channel's official 2026 transmission announcement identified Taimoor and Anum as its hosts for a second year.
