= Pehchaan (2022 TV series) =

2022 Pakistani television series

- Genre: Drama; Romance
- Written by: Rubina Kabir Khan
- Directed by: Asad Jabal
- Starring: Hiba Bukhari; Syed Jibran; Nadia Khan; Eshal Fayyaz
- Opening theme: Yeh Haal-e-dil by Yashal Shahid and Rafaay Israr
- Country of origin: Pakistan
- Original language: Urdu
- No. of episodes: 26

Production
- Producer: Momina Duraid
- Production locations: Karachi, Pakistan; Istanbul, Turkey
- Camera setup: Multi camera
- Running time: 35-42 minutes
- Production company: Momina Duraid Productions

Original release
- Network: Hum TV
- Release: 9 June – 2 September 2022

Pehchaan (transl. Identity) is a 2022 Pakistani television series produced by Momina Duraid for Hum TV, written by Rubina Kabir Khan and directed by Asad Jabal. It focuses on women's role in building and maintaining a relation and the identity crisis they may come to face. It originally aired from 9 June 2022 to 2 September 2022.

The plot revolves around Sharmeen (AKA Kukki) who wants to get divorce from her husband and doesn't tell anyone the reason for that. The series features Hiba Bukhari, Syed Jibran, Mirza Zain Baig, Nadia Khan and Eshal Fayyaz in leading roles. The series is set in Istanbul, Turkey and Karachi, Pakistan.

== Plot ==
Kukki is a determined housewife who resides in Istanbul with her spouse, Adnan, and their children, Hamna and Fahad. One day, upon discovering Adnan's infidelity, she decides to embark on a trip to Pakistan. As Adnan is preoccupied with work and their children are preparing for their exams, Kukki travels alone. Upon arrival, Adnan's sister, Shaheena, meets her at the airport, but Kukki is nowhere to be found. The family becomes worried about her disappearance, assuming that she left on her own after learning about her previous connection with Aziz Waqar, a man who had wished to marry her before she married Adnan. Kukki had previously rejected Aziz's advances as she was interested in Adnan, but the two maintained a close relationship as Aziz's sister, Nargis, was Kukki's best friend.

Adnan travels to Pakistan after learning of Kukki's disappearance, and their children learn about their mother's absence. Adnan visits Aziz's home in search of Kukki, but he is preoccupied with wedding preparations and invites Adnan to attend his wedding.

Kukki eventually returns home, and the family questions her, but she remains silent and composed. When Adnan learns of her return, he arrives with his parents, but Kukki refuses to speak to him or meet him. Later, it is revealed that Kukki had gone to her aunt Safina's house, where she had been living for a few days. Kukki's father had not allowed her to pursue her dreams, causing her to feel trapped and unfulfilled.

After spending some time at her parents' home, Kukki returns to Safina's house, and Adnan returns to Turkey, but he continues to try to resolve the matter. When Shaheena visits Kukki to offer financial assistance, Kukki declines as she has started working as a teacher at a school. Aziz discovers that Kukki's marriage is in jeopardy, and he calls off his engagement due to his unrequited love for her. He visits Kukki with Nargis and her parents to help her resolve the problem, but Kukki remains tight-lipped and tells them not to worry about her. She becomes upset when she realizes that her children have not attempted to contact her.

With Aziz's minor assistance, Kukki starts a food service at Safina's house and decides to pursue a legal divorce. When her father learns of her decision, he decides to support her, as he did not want to repeat the same mistakes he made with his sister. He visits Kukki and assures her of his support should Adnan make a mistake. Meanwhile, in Istanbul, Kehkeshan meets Adnan and reveals that her husband divorced her after discovering their affair. She proposes to marry Adnan, but he declines, stating that he loves Kukki, the mother of his children. Kehkeshan then informs Adnan that Kukki confided in her, including revealing that Kukki is the nickname Adnan gave to Sharmeen. Kukki had felt unable to do certain things that Adnan liked, resulting in him cheating.

== Cast ==
- Hiba Bukhari as Sharmeen "Kukki" Adnan
- Syed Jibran as Adnan, Sharmeen's husband
- Mirza Zain Baig as Aziz Waqar, Sharmeen’s lover
- Nadia Khan as Safina, sister of Sharmeen's father
- Sajida Syed as Nafeesa Begum, Adnan's mother
- Syed Mohammad Ahmed as Adnan's father
- Huma Nawab as Bano, Sharmeen's mother
- Qavi Khan as Sharmeen's father
- Nadia Hussain as Shaheena, Adnan's sister
- Sadaf Aashan as Saba, Sharmeen's sister
- Sohail Sameer as Haider, Sharmeen's brother
- Hajra Khan as Fareeha, Haider's wife
- Eshal Fayyaz as Kehkeshan, Adnan's ex
- Inaya Khan as Nargis, Aziz's sister
- Aadi Khan as Umer, Shaheena's son
- Anoushey Rania Khan as Faryal, Haider and Fareeha's daughter
- Aina Asif as Hamna, Sharmeen and Adnan's daughter
- Ahmed Usman as Fahad, Sharmeen and Adnan's son
- Diya Mughal as Hina, Sharmeen's sister
- Usman Mazhar as Hameed, Hina's husband
- Salma Asim as mother of Nargis and Aziz

=== Guest ===
- Asad Mumtaz Malik as Detective Dilshad (Episode 4)
- Birjees Farooqui as Kehkeshan's mother (Episode 9)
- Noor ul Hassan as Kehkeshan's father (Episode 9)
- Tooba Anwar as fiancée of Aziz (episodes 21 & 26)

== Soundtrack ==
"Yeh Haal-e-Dil"

Song by: Yashal Shahid; Raafay Israr
- Language: Urdu
- Released: 23 May 2022
- Genre: Soundtrack
- Length: 4:16
- Composer: Raafay Israr
- Lyricist: Sabir Zafar

Official video
- Pehchaan - Lyrical OST on YouTube

== Production ==
=== Development ===
In March 2022, it was reported that Hiba Bukhari and Nadia Khan would star as leading roles in director Asad Jabal's next project. In preparation for her role, Khan learnt the dance Kathak.

== Reception ==
=== Television ratings ===
Ep#	Broadcast date	TRP(s)	Ref.
10	8 July 2022	4.9	

=== Critical reception ===
The website Galaxy Lollywood gave a positive review of the first episode, noting several performances, in particular Bukhari's. The News gave the storyline an average rating but praised Bukhari's performance and termed it "the only redeeming quality". Another reviewer from the same newspaper also praised Bukhari's performance and gave an appreciable review of the first 6-8 episodes stating, "Over the span of a few episodes, Pehchaan had done a really good job of creating fleshed out characters and a sense of mystery". Maliha Rehman of Dawn praised its story and said that stereotypes that are challenged in it make it unique even. Further, she described it as, "the sort of story that needs to be told to a mass audience."
