= Bholi Bano =

Pakistani television series

- Title screen
- بھولی بانو
- Genre: Family drama Romantic drama
- Created by: Faysal Manzoor Khan
- Written by: Samra Bukhari
- Directed by: Furqan Adam
- Starring: Hiba Bukhari; Syed Jibran; Namrah Shahid
- Country of origin: Pakistan
- Original language: Urdu
- No. of episodes: 48

Production
- Producer: Mastermind Production
- Production locations: Sindh, Pakistan
- Running time: Approx 40 Minutes

Original release
- Network: Geo Entertainment
- Release: 27 February – 11 September 2017

Bholi Bano (Urdu: بھولی بانو, lit. 'Naïve Bano') is a 2017 Pakistani drama serial directed by Furqan Adam, produced by Mastermind Production and written by Samra Bukhari. It stars newcomer Hiba Bukhari and Syed Jibran as the female and male lead respectively.

== Plot ==
The story of the serial is based upon a simple and innocent girl Bano who lives with her maternal grandmother and maternal uncle as her parents had died. Life changes for Bano when a landholder from internal Sindh, Tajdaar, falls in love with her. Bano was unaware of his love. Soon after Bano was married to her relative's son, Soban. There she faced hatred of Soban's step-mother and step-sister. She tries to find refuge in Soban but he is not courageous enough to fight for her and that's where Tajdaar steps in to help her but Bano, being a faithful girl, does not want any help from him.

== Cast ==
- Hiba Bukhari as Bano
- Syed Jibran as Tajdaar
- Arez Ahmed as Soban
- Namrah Shahid as Zeenia
- Humaira Bano as Zeenia's mother
- Samina Ahmed as Nani
- Farah Nadir as Bano's aunt
- Abdullah Kadwani
- Sajida Syed as Kulsoom
- Waseem Abbas as Asghar
- Imran Bukhari as Abid
- Hajra Yamin as Shela
- Kanwar Arsalan as Kaif
- Zuhab Khan as Tipu

== Production ==
The serial was filmed in various areas of Sindh, including Mirpur Khas, Hyderabad, Karachi and also in some internal villages of Sindh.

== Released ==
The drama was premiered on 27 February 2017 on Monday and Tuesday at 9:00 twice a week. It was one of the top rated and most watched serials of 2017. After the end of Khaali Haath its timing changed to Mondays at 8:00 P.m.
