= Teri Chhaon Mein =

- Genre: Romance; Crime
- Written by: Radain Shah
- Directed by: Abdullah Badeni
- Starring: Danish Taimoor; Laiba Khurram
- Country of origin: Pakistan
- Original language: Urdu
- No. of episodes: 27

Production
- Producer: Momina Duraid
- Production locations: Karachi, Pakistan
- Camera setup: Multi-camera setup
- Running time: 40 minutes
- Production company: MD Productions

Original release
- Network: Hum TV
- Release: May 30 – November 28, 2024

Teri Chhaon Mein is a 2024 Pakistani romantic drama series that premiered on Hum TV on 30 May 2024. It stars Danish Taimoor and debutant Laiba Khurram in lead roles. The story follows Wadeema, a young diffident girl whose life takes a positive turn after meeting Salaar, who introduces her to love and helps her discover her identity.

== Plot ==
Wadeema (Laiba Khurram) lives under the strict supervision of her father, Muzaffar, who wants to control her future and arrange her marriage according to his own interests. Her life takes an unexpected turn when she meets Salaar (Danish Taimoor), a young entrepreneur who falls in love with her. Despite family opposition and several obstacles, their relationship grows stronger. When their families refuse to accept their relationship, Wadeema makes a life-changing decision and marries Salaar against her family's wishes.

However, their happiness is short-lived. Soon after their marriage, Wadeema mysteriously disappears after becoming the victim of a kidnapping plot. Salaar is left desperate to find his wife, while a series of unexpected revelations begin to expose a much darker situation than he initially imagined.

Taken far away from her home, Wadeema finds herself trapped among people whose intentions are difficult to understand. As she struggles to find a way back, she encounters other women facing similar circumstances and discovers the disturbing reality behind her disappearance. Meanwhile, Salaar's search leads him towards a dangerous network involving influential individuals, deception and hidden connections.

As both Wadeema and Salaar face challenges in their separate journeys, secrets gradually come to light, testing their courage, trust and relationship. Their fight for reunion eventually becomes connected to a much larger struggle for justice.

== Cast ==
- Danish Taimoor as Salaar
- Laiba Khurram as Wadeema
- Sohail Sameer as Muzaffar; Wadeema's father
- Tara Mahmood as Wadeema's mother
- Behroz Sabzwari as Salaar's father
- Annie Zaidi as Salaar's mother
- Angeline Malik as Naseeban
- Hassan Niazi as Yawar
- Amna Malik as Yawar's wife
- Shabbir Jan as Wadeema's Uncle
- Hurriya Mansoor as Seher; Salaar's friend
- Tehseen Wajahat as Majid; Salaar's friend
- Raza Abid as Naveed; Wadeema's fiancé

== Reception ==
The series received criticism for its writing and characterisation. In a review published in Dawn on 9 June 2024, Sadaf Haider criticised the writing and described Laiba Khurram's performance as lacking expression. However, she praised Danish Taimoor's portrayal of Salaar, noting that he convincingly conveyed the character's sudden attraction towards Wadeema. Haider also observed that the storyline's depiction of an overprotective and controlling father had the potential to explore an interesting subject.

The series also generated discussion over its portrayal of court marriage. Daily Times, in a report published on 23 July 2024, documented mixed reactions to the storyline involving Salaar and Wadeema. While some viewers supported the couple's decision to marry, others criticised the portrayal of a young woman leaving her home to marry against her family's wishes.
