= Nida Mumtaz =

Pakistani actress

- Born: 10 September 1960 (age 66); Karachi, Pakistan
- Education: University of Karachi (Bachelor)
- Occupation: Actress
- Years active: 1984 – present
- Spouse: Imran
- Children: 3
- Parent: Salma Mumtaz (mother)
- Relatives: Shammi (aunt); Sadaf Kanwal (niece)

Nida Mumtaz (born 10 September 1960) is a Pakistani actress. She is known for her roles in the dramas Kahin Deep Jaley, Deewangi and Khoob Seerat. She has also appeared in the films Wrong No. and Mehrunisa V Lub U.

== Early life ==
Nida was born on 10 September 1960 in Karachi, Pakistan. She completed her studies from University of Karachi.

== Career ==
Mumtaz started her career in the 1980s from PTV. She has played roles in PTV classics, such as Din, Khwahish, Pyas and Dooriyan. She has also acted in several Urdu and Punjabi films. However, due to her lack of dance expertise, she had to give up acting in films.

After a break of almost 15–20 years following her marriage, Mumtaz returned to television and has now frequently appeared in the roles of a mother, including in the dramas Alif, Deewangi, Raqs-e-Bismil and Fraud.

== Personal life ==
Nida's aunt Shammi was an actress and her uncle, Pervaiz Nasir, was a film producer. Her mother, Salma Mumtaz, who was an actress who died in 2012. Nida took a break from acting but has now returned. Nida is the aunt of actress and model Sadaf Kanwal.

== Filmography ==
=== Television ===
Year	Title	Role	Network
1988	Teesra Khat	Beena	PTV
1989	Pyas	Janto	PTV
1992	Din	Shaheen	PTV
1993	Khuwahish	Badray	PTV
1993	Zakham	Maira	PTV
1993	Fareb	Maryam	PTV
1994	Dal Dal	Seemi	PTV
1998	Jeet	Sonia	PTV
2015	Aye Zindagi	Amma	Hum TV
2015	Aitebaar	Ahmer's mother	Aaj Entertainment
2015	Karb	Mahnoor	Hum TV
2016	Tum Meri Ho	Ana's mother	ARY Digital
2016	Ab Kar Meri Rafugari	Zahida Mujahid	ARY Digital
2016	Ahsas	Hina's mother	Urdu 1
2016	Bay Aib	Ayesha	Urdu 1
2016	Dekho Chaand Aaya	Ammi Jaan	Geo Entertainment
2016	Maikay Ki Yaad Na Aaye	Shah Sahab's wife	Geo TV
2016	Shehrnaz	Sherry's aunt	Urdu 1
2016	Mera Yaar Miladay	Isra's mother	ARY Digital
2017	Khaali Haath	Farhat	Geo Entertainment
2017	Sun Yaara	Rafia	ARY Digital
2017	Dil-e-Nadaan	Khala	Express Entertainment
2017	Bilqees Urf Bitto	Bittio's mother	Urdu 1
2017	Rasm E Duniya	Bushra	ARY Digital
2017	Main Maa Nahi Banna Chahti	Imaan's mother	Hum TV
2017	Dil Nawaz	Rasheeda	A Plus
2017	Khamoshi	Shahnaz	Hum TV
2017	Gumrah	Aapa	Hum TV
2018	Mera Khuda Janay	Kulsoom	Geo TV
2018	Dil Mom Ka Diya	Ulfat and Farhat's mother	ARY Digital
2018	Tum Se Hi Talluq Hai	Rahma's mother	Geo Entertainment
2018	Qaid	Shakra	Geo Entertainment
2019	Hasad	Nusrat	ARY Digital
2019	Makafaat	Ami	Geo Entertainment
2019	Dil Kiya Karay	Saadi's mother	Geo Entertainment
2019	Kaisa Hai Naseeban	Marium	ARY Digital
2019	Mere Humdam	Warda's mother	Hum TV
2019	Mera Rab Waris	Naheed	Geo Entertainment
2019	Ramz-e-Ishq	Safiya	Geo Entertainment
2019	Thora Sa Haq	Munazzah	ARY Digital
2019	Tera Yahan Koi Nahin	Faryal	Hum TV
2019	Kahin Deep Jaley	Rehana	Geo Entertainment
2019	Alif	Mumtaz Begum	Geo TV
2019	Deewangi	Narmeen's mother	Geo Entertainment
2020	Makafaat Season 2	Ramsha	Geo Entertainment
2020	Dikhawa	Saira's mother	Geo Entertainment
2020	Khoob Seerat	Rani	Geo Entertainment
2020	Raaz-e-Ulfat	Nomi's mother	Geo TV
2020	Uraan	Zahida	Geo Entertainment
2020	Dulhan	Aasia Begum	Hum TV
2020	Main Agar Chup Hoon	Tahira	Geo Entertainment
2020	Raqs-e-Bismil	Hajra	Hum TV
2021	Shehnai	Ambreen	ARY Digital
2021	Dikhawa Season 2	Zubair's mother	Geo Entertainment
2021	Mohlat	Salman's mother	Geo TV
2021	Oye Motti	Malika's mother	Express Entertainment
2021	Sirat-e-Mustaqeem	Jameela	ARY Digital
2021	Teri Behisi	Zara's mother	Geo TV
2021	Berukhi	Sabeen's mother	ARY Digital
2022	Badzaat	Narmeen Begum	Geo TV
2022	Mamlaat	Zoheb's mother	Geo Entertainment
2022	Makafaat Season 4	Faria's mother	Geo Entertainment
2022	Dikhawa Season 3	Ayesha	Geo Entertainment
2022	Usne Chaha Tha Chand	Sabahat	PTV
2022	Fraud	Shehnaz	ARY Digital
2022	Zakham	Shahida	Geo Entertainment
2022	Bikhray Hain Hum	Kausar	Hum TV
2022	Meri Hai Kiya Khata	Rahmat	Aan TV
2022	Oye Motti Season 2	Farzana's mother	Express Entertainment
2023	Sar-e-Rah	Shabana	ARY Digital
2023	Sirat-e-Mustaqeem Season 3	Farwa	ARY Digital
2023	Ahsaas	Bushra's mother	Express Entertainment
2023	Mein Kahani Hun	Rozina	Express Entertainment
2023	Tere Ishq Ke Naam	Rasheeda	ARY Digital
2023	Meray Hi Rehna	Farida	ARY Digital
2023	22 Qadam	Khalida Begum	Green Entertainment
2023	Wonderland	Seema	Green Entertainment
2023	Dil Hi Tou Hai	Anisa	ARY Digital
2023	Sukoon	Massooda	ARY Digital
2023	Dooriyan	Shaista	Hum TV
2024	Akhara	Misra	Green Entertainment
2024	Pagal Khana	Naila	Green Entertainment
2024	Umm-e-Ayesha	Naila	Geo Entertainment
2024	Dikhawa Season 5	Razia	Geo Entertainment
2024	Meri Shahzadiyan	Zareen	BOL Entertainment
2024	Habil Aur Qabil	Kehkashan	Geo Entertainment
2025	Mann Marzi	Afroz	Geo TV
2025	Dastak	Sadia	ARY Digital
2025	Doosra Chehra	Beenish	Geo TV
2025	Dayan	Hajra	Geo Entertainment
2025	Mohra	Armeen	Geo TV
2025	Shikwa	Amna	ARY Digital
2025	Main Zameen Tu Aasmaan	Fareeda	Green Entertainment
2026	Iblees	Samreen	Geo Entertainment
2026	Humrahi	Suraiyya	Geo TV

=== Web series ===
Year	Title	Role	Director	Notes	Ref
2024	Abdullahpur Ka Devdas	Sakeena	Anjum Shahzad	TV series for Zee Zindagi	

=== Telefilm ===
Year	Title	Role
2016	Sanaullah Ki Dusri Shaadi	Sanaullah's mother-in-law
2021	Zoya Nay Haan Kardi	Zareena
2021	Hangor S-131	Hadi's mother
2022	Razia Sultan	Sultan's mother
2022	Aunty Allergy	Zoya's mother
2023	L Love You Zara	Zain's mother
2024	Tamanna Ki Aarzu	Parveen
2024	Jodi Ban Gayi	Musarrat

=== Film ===
Year	Film	Language
1987	Allah Rakha	Punjabi
1988	Farz-o-Qanoon	Pashto
1988	Baghi Haseena	Urdu
1988	Gharibon Ka Badshah	Urdu
1989	Rogi	Punjabi
1989	Achhu 302	Punjabi
1990	Jangloos	Punjabi
1990	Palay Khan	Punjabi
1990	Khatarnak	Punjabi
1990	Qudrat Da Intaqam	Punjabi
1990	Paisa Naach Nachaway	Punjabi
1990	Chan Badmash	Punjabi
1990	Siren	Punjabi
1990	Sarmaya	Punjabi
1991	Gandasa	Punjabi
1991	Kalay Chor	Urdu / Punjabi
1991	Badmash Thug	Punjabi / Urdu
1991	Pyar Hi Pyar	Punjabi / Urdu
1991	Sailab	Urdu / Punjabi
1991	Aalmi Jasoos	Punjabi / Urdu
1992	Zindagi	Punjabi / Urdu
1993	Da Nakrezo Shpa	Pashto
1994	Malang Bacha	Pashto
1996	Iqtadar	Punjabi
2015	Wrong No.	Urdu
2017	Mehrunisa V Lub U	Urdu
