= Morning with Sahir =

- Genre: Morning show
- Directed by: Ahmed Ali Hashmi
- Presented by: Sahir Lodhi
- Country of origin: Pakistan

Production
- Executive producer: Ahmed Ali Hashmi
- Production location: Lahore, Pakistan
- Running time: 120 minutes (per episode)

Original release
- Network: A-Plus Entertainment
- Release: 2012 – 2013

Morning With Sahir was an Urdu-language morning show in Pakistan that aired on A-Plus Entertainment from 2012 to 2013. It was hosted by Sahir Lodhi.
