= Syed Jibran =

Pakistani actor

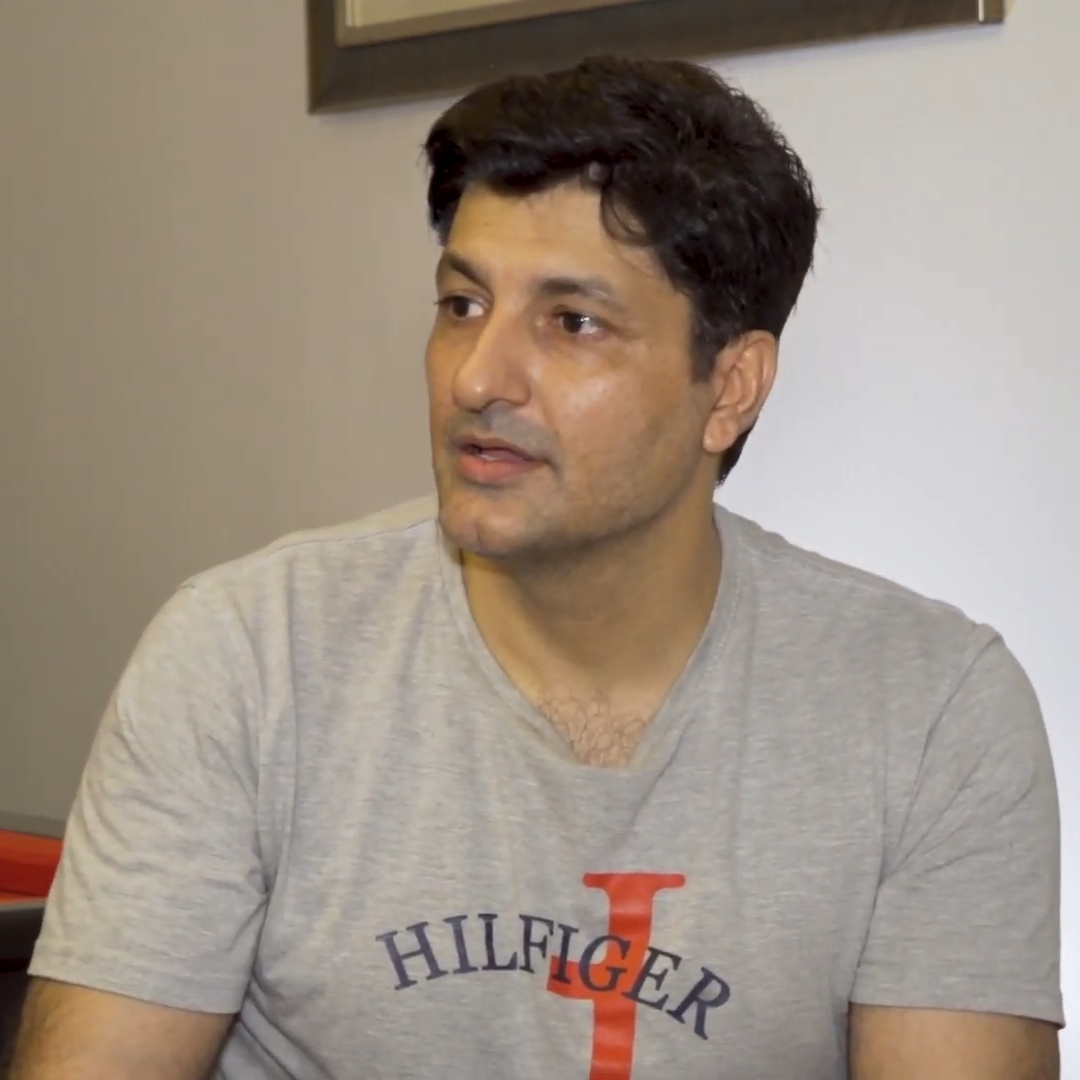
- Syed Jibran in 2024
- Born: Syed Jibran; 14 October 1979 (age 46); Jhelum, Punjab, Pakistan
- Occupations: Actor; Entrepreneur
- Years active: 2001-present
- Known for: Chup Raho (2014); Noor-e-Zindagi (2016); Khuda Mera Bhi Hai (2016-2017)
- Spouse: Afifa Jibran (m. 2011)

Syed Jibran (Urdu: سید جبران; born 14 October 1979, Jhelum) is a Pakistani actor and entrepreneur.

He started his career with Pakistan Television Network in 2001 while he made his film debut with Ghabrana Nahi Hai in 2022.

== Early life and education ==
Syed Jibran was born into a Punjabi-Pashtun family of medical professionals. His father Colonel (r) Dr. Syed Muqadar Shah was an influential cancer specialist in Rawalpindi.

His interest in acting started when he was a third-year student at the Rawalpindi Medical University. He completed his MBBS, but did not practice as a doctor.

== Personal life ==
In 2011, he married Afifa Jibran. Together, they have one daughter and two sons.

== Career ==
=== Acting ===
In 2001, after some struggle, he began his acting career with Taufeeq Hussain Shah's Hook on PTV, where he had two scenes, before being spotted by director Tariq Meraj and later being noticed in the famous sitcom Jutt and Bond (2001–2004) starring Fawad Khan and Ahmed Ali Butt.

=== Food business ===
He operates several well-known restaurants in Islamabad, also having introduced the Gelato Affair franchise in the city.

== Filmography ==
Key
†	denotes film / drama that has not released yet
†	Denotes films / drama that are currently on cinema / on air

=== Television serials ===
Year	Drama	Role	Network	Ref(s)
2001	Hook		PTV	
2001	Jutt and Bond		Indus TV	
2007	Cousins	Sheraz (Sherry)	PTV	
2009	Jinnah Ke Naam	Abid Khan	PTV	
2009	Khuda Zameen Se Gaya Nahin	Captain Asfandyar	PTV	
2010	Chand Pe Dastak		Hum TV	
2010	Qaid-e-Tanhai	Jawad	Hum TV	
2011	Tum Ho Ke Chup	Nomi	Geo TV	
2011	Tinkay	Farhan	PTV	
2014	Koi Deepak Ho		Express Entertainment	
2014	Chup Raho	Numair	ARY Digital	
2014	Muhabbat Ab Nahi Hugi	Arham	Hum TV	
2014	Shukk	Ali	ARY Digital	
2015	Ishq Parast	Zohaib Ahmad	ARY Digital	
2015	Bojh		Geo Entertainment	
2015	Shert	Sameer	Hum TV	
2016	Noor-e-Zindagi	Saleem	Geo Entertainment	
2016	Khuda Mera Bhi Hai	Zain	ARY Digital	
2016	Seeta Bagri	Saeen	TVOne Global	
2016	Khoat		ARY Digital	
2016	Chingari		Express Entertainment	
2017	Bholi Bano	Tajdaar	Geo Entertainment	
2017	Ghairat	Usman	ARY Digital	
2018	Aik Thi Rania	Fahad	Geo Entertainment	
2018	Khudgarz	Junaid	ARY Digital	
2018	Tum Se Hi Talluq Hai	Saadan	Geo Entertainment	
2018	Ranjha Ranjha Kardi	Sahir	Hum TV	
2018	Qaid	Ashir	Geo Entertainment	
2019	Mere Humdam	Usama	Hum TV	
2019	Meray Mohsin	Mohsin	Geo TV	
2020	Dil Ruba	Khurram Shehzad	Hum TV	
2020	Tarap	Adil	Hum TV	
2021	Safar Tamam Howa	Jamal	Hum TV	
2021	Mohabbat Daagh Ki Surat	Affaq	Geo TV	
2022	Aitebaar	Hamza	Hum TV	
2022	Meray Humnasheen	Amroz	Geo TV	
2022	Pehchaan	Adnan	Hum TV	
2022	Daraar	Shaheer	Geo Entertainment	
2023	Neem	Karamat Khan	Hum TV	
2023	Jinzada	Feroz / Burqaan	Geo Entertainment	
2023	Adawat	Asjad	ARY Digital	
2024	Pagal Khana	Dr. Behram	Green Entertainment	
2024	Mooray Piya		Green Entertainment	
2025	Meri Tanhai	Ali	Hum TV	
2025	Jinn Ki Shadi Unki Shadi	Azar	Hum TV	
2025	Muamma	Sarmad	Hum TV	
2026	Laaj	Shahnawaz Murad	Green Entertainment	

=== Films ===
Year	Title	Role	Notes
2022	Ghabrana Nahi Hai	Vicky	

== Awards and nominations ==
Year	Award	Category	Project	Result
2015	Lux Style Awards	Best Television Actor	Chup Raho	Nominated
2017	International Pakistan Prestige Awards	Best Actor TV Serial	Noor-e-Zindagi	Nominated
