= Inteha e Ishq =

Pakistani TV drama

- انتہائے عشق
- Written by: Shagufta Bhatti
- Directed by: Dilawar Malik
- Country of origin: Pakistan
- Original language: Urdu
- No. of episodes: 32

Production
- Producers: Irfan Rafique; Khurram Riaz
- Production location: Lahore, Pakistan
- Camera setup: multi-camera
- Production companies: Oriental Films; Ocean Productions

Original release
- Network: A-Plus TV
- Release: 15 September 2021 – 13 April 2022

Inteha-e-Ishq (Urdu: انتہائے عشق, lit. 'Limit of love') is a Pakistani drama television series aired on A-Plus TV from September 2021 to April 2022. It is directed by Dilawar Malik and features Hiba Bukhari and Junaid Khan in leading roles.

== Synopsis ==
Rida and Saim are cousins and love each other, both want to marry each other and everyone except Saim's mother, Naseema, is supportive. She refuses Rida's parents proposal to make the latter her daughter-in-law. On the engagement fixation of Rida, Saim tells everyone that he loves Rida. Due to all this drama, Rida's father's health deteriorates and he is shifted to hospital where Doctor Daniyal (a man who is smitten by Rida's beauty in market days before) treats him. Saim's father, Saeed, rebukes Naseema due to her schemes that caused the current condition of Rida's father. Saim is exhausted and tries to go abroad. Then Saeed gets Rida and Saim engaged. Dr. Daniyal feels hurt when he learns that Rida is soon to marry.

== Cast ==
- Hiba Bukhari
- Junaid Khan
- Arez Ahmed
- Sara Aijaz
- Beena Chaudhary
- Ismat Iqbal
- Samia Butt
- Asad Mehmood
- Maria Malik
