= Jaan Nisar =

2024 Pakistani television series

- جان نثار
- Genre: Romance; Drama
- Written by: Rehana Aftab
- Directed by: Mohsin Mirza
- Starring: Danish Taimoor; Hiba Bukhari
- Country of origin: Pakistan
- Original language: Urdu
- No. of seasons: 1

Production
- Producers: Abdullah Kadwani; Asad Qureshi
- Production company: 7th Sky Entertainment

Original release
- Network: Geo TV
- Release: 11 May – 26 October 2024

Jaan Nisar (English: Beloved) is a Pakistani romantic drama television series produced by Abdullah Kadwani and Asad Qureshi under the banner of 7th Sky Entertainment. It stars Danish Taimoor and Hiba Bukhari in lead roles while Hiba Ali Khan as antagonist. The drama surpassed two billion views on YouTube during its original run.

== Plot ==
Nosherwan, a handsome young man, carries the burden of family responsibilities following his brother's death. Meanwhile, Dua, a lively and beautiful girl, struggles with unhappiness due to her father's strict nature. Nosherwan falls in love with Dua at first sight. Meanwhile, Dua begins developing feelings for Faraz. Nosherwan visits his family at the mansion, where Kashmala, his wife and the widow of his late brother Zawar, eagerly awaits his arrival. Meanwhile, Faraz plans to gift Dua a mobile phone. Dua and Faraz grow closer and develop feelings for each other. However, Dua remains unaware that Faraz's mother has approached Fiza's family with a marriage proposal. Faraz continues his relationship with Dua despite his parents arranging his marriage to Fiza. Meanwhile, tensions between Nosherwan and Kashmala continue to increase. Nosherwan and Dua have an unusual first encounter. Following their meeting, Nosherwan orders Jaffar to gather information about her. Nosherwan falls deeper in love with Dua, while she reluctantly agrees to meet Faraz after he emotionally manipulates her. Dua falls into Faraz's trap, but fate intervenes before he can carry out his intentions. Meanwhile, Nosherwan is seriously injured in a deadly attack. Dua's life takes an unexpected turn when she ends up at a police station, while Fiza begins a new chapter with Faraz. Meanwhile, Nosherwan recovers in the hospital. Aslam firmly refuses to let Dua return home after her release from jail. His decision triggers a chain of events that reaches Fiza's in-laws, putting her married life at risk. As Nosherwan recovers and leaves the hospital, Dua searches for shelter. Meanwhile, Faraz makes a shocking discovery that Fiza is Dua's sister. An unexpected stranger comes to Dua's rescue and offers her shelter. Meanwhile, Nosherwan discovers that Dua is missing. Dua finds refuge in an unexpected place, while Fiza continues struggling with her difficult relationship with her husband and mother-in-law. Meanwhile, Nosherwan intensifies his search for Dua. Dua discovers Zunaira's true intentions as Nosherwan searches throughout the city for her. Meanwhile, Faraz decides to divorce Fiza. Rumi promises to rescue Dua from Zunaira's control. Meanwhile, a shocking incident at a lavish party leaves Nosherwan stunned when he discovers Dua's difficult circumstances. After an extensive search, Nosherwan finally finds Dua at Zunaira's residence and reunites with the woman he loves. Nosherwan's persistence pays off when Dua accepts his marriage proposal, opening a new chapter in their lives. Meanwhile, tensions between Fiza and Faraz continue to grow. Nosherwan's family discovers his secret engagement and confronts him with difficult questions. Meanwhile, Dua eagerly awaits her groom at the wedding ceremony, unaware of the problems unfolding at Nosherwan's end. Newlyweds Nosherwan and Dua become victims of a vicious attack orchestrated by Kashmala, cutting their happiness short. Nosherwan and Dua begin their married life together, while Faraz and Fiza continue facing difficulties in their troubled relationship. Nosherwan confronts Kashmala over her evil plan against Dua, but she remains determined to create differences between the newlyweds. Nosherwan reconciles with Dua, clears her doubts, and strengthens their relationship. Meanwhile, the family considers an important decision regarding Kashmala's future at the mansion. Kashmala and Zunaira join forces to deceive and torment Dua. Meanwhile, Fiza shares the happy news of her pregnancy, but Faraz refuses to accept it.

Dua finds comfort in Nosherwan's support, while Faraz gives Fiza a devastating ultimatum that destroys her hopes of becoming a mother. Nosherwan uncovers Zunaira's plan to blackmail Dua and takes decisive action to protect her. Meanwhile, Fehmida discovers the hidden difficulties in Fiza's married life. Sarfaraz's irresponsible actions lead to Fiza's heartbreaking miscarriage. Meanwhile, Nosherwan's past returns to create new complications in his life. Farah returns to Nosherwan's life, bringing back old emotions. Meanwhile, Fiza gives false testimony to protect Faraz from legal consequences. Farah's request for marriage is firmly rejected by Nosherwan, leaving her disappointed. Meanwhile, Dua stands up for herself and strongly confronts Kashmala. Dua and Farah come face to face at a wedding, creating an uncomfortable situation for Nosherwan. Later, Dua reconnects with Fiza, while Farah plots to create misunderstandings between Dua and Nosherwan. Farah attempts to create differences between Nosherwan and Dua, but her plans fail as the couple's strong relationship withstands her schemes. In a desperate attempt to win Nosherwan back, Farah takes a dangerous step. Meanwhile, Dua reunites with her family and stands up against her father's controlling behaviour. Dua finally finds happiness and peace after reuniting with her loved ones. Meanwhile, Nosherwan remains troubled by Farah's obsession with him. Dua finds relief when Aslam forgives her, freeing her from the burden of guilt. Meanwhile, Nosherwan continues meeting Farah secretly. Nosherwan's secret meetings with Farah are discovered by his parents. Meanwhile, Dua learns about the problems Fiza has been hiding. Nosherwan receives a stern warning from his parents over his secret meetings with Farah. Meanwhile, Dua's first meeting with his parents leads to a shocking revelation. Dua and Nosherwan continue struggling with their relationship, while Sumbul reveals a long-hidden truth to Fiza. Nosherwan arrives just in time to rescue Farah. Meanwhile, Sumbul's request for Fiza to meet Khizer ends in a tragic incident. Tensions between Dua and Nosherwan reach their peak. Meanwhile, Sumbul's family discovers her feelings for Khizer under difficult circumstances. Nosherwan takes steps to remove Farah from his and Dua's lives. Meanwhile, Fiza intervenes to help Sumbul fulfil her long-awaited wish. Dua's world is turned upside down when she confronts her past and discovers a shocking truth that challenges everything she believed. Nosherwan comforts a devastated Dua, while Faraz directs his anger towards Fiza after receiving a stern reprimand from Nosherwan at the office. Sarfaraz continues interfering in Dua and Sumbul's lives. Meanwhile, Dua visits Nosherwan's magnificent family mansion for the first time. Sarfaraz's accusations against Fiza become increasingly serious, while Kashmala grows resentful after witnessing the loving relationship between Nosherwan, his parents, and Dua. Kashmala's evil intentions intensify as she plots to harm Dua. Meanwhile, Fiza's married life becomes increasingly difficult as her in-laws change their behaviour towards her. Sarfaraz is shocked to discover that Dua is Nosherwan's wife. Meanwhile, Fiza receives some unexpected good news. Nosherwan and Dua enjoy a happy married life, but Kashmala and Faraz continue plotting against them, threatening to destroy their relationship. Nosherwan begins losing trust in Dua as details about her past with Sarfaraz emerge through Kashmala's interference.

Fiza's world falls apart when she discovers the truth about Sarfaraz and Dua's past. Meanwhile, Nosherwan learns that Sarfaraz has continued manipulating Dua's life. Fiza exposes Sarfaraz's deception in front of his family. Meanwhile, Nosherwan and Dua overcome their misunderstandings as the truth finally comes to light. Kashmala forms an unexpected alliance with Sarfaraz and seeks his assistance in separating Dua from Nosherwan. Following his divorce from Fiza, Sarfaraz becomes determined to ruin Dua's life while carrying out Kashmala's elaborate plan against her. Kashmala and Sarfaraz succeed in creating doubts in Nosherwan's mind about Dua. However, Dua and Nosherwan receive some joyful news that leaves Kashmala upset. Despite the happiness surrounding her pregnancy, Dua becomes trapped in Kashmala and Sarfaraz's schemes, causing her to lose the trust of both Nosherwan and Fiza. With Kashmala's assistance, Sarfaraz secretly enters Dua's room, further increasing Nosherwan's doubts about her loyalty. Kashmala plots to destroy Dua by poisoning Nosherwan's food and cleverly framing Dua for the attempted poisoning. Nosherwan fights for his life in the hospital as Kashmala falsely accuses Dua of trying to murder him, resulting in Dua's arrest. Dua suffers behind bars while Nosherwan regains consciousness and immediately asks about her, leaving Kashmala furious. Nosherwan manages to secure Dua's release from jail, but her return home is overshadowed by Fiza's harsh remarks, creating further tension. Nosherwan decides to reconcile with Dua, but Sarfaraz, accompanied by Kashmala, reaches Dua's home first, creating more complications between the couple. Nosherwan faces pressure from his family and Kashmala to divorce Dua, leaving him confused. Meanwhile, Dua takes matters into her own hands and decides to expose Kashmala as the real mastermind behind their problems. Dua meets Sarfaraz to discover his actual intentions, but the encounter further increases Fiza's hostility towards her, making their already strained relationship worse. Kashmala and Sarfaraz's partnership begins to fall apart, leading to growing conflict between them. Meanwhile, Dua devises a clever plan to expose Sarfaraz's intentions and uncover the truth behind his actions. Kashmala reflects on past events and begins plotting to eliminate Sarfaraz. Meanwhile, Nosherwan struggles with his emotions and decides to end his relationship with Dua permanently. Jaffar shares important information with Dua as Nosherwan proceeds with his divorce plans. Meanwhile, Baba Saeein discovers Zawar's diary, which contains secrets capable of changing everything. With Jaffar's assistance, Dua exposes the true faces of Kashmala and Sarfaraz. Sarfaraz is sent to jail, while Dua and Nosherwan reunite. Meanwhile, Kashmala faces the consequences of her actions and is admitted to a mental asylum.

== Cast ==
- Danish Taimoor as Nosherwan Ghaznavi
- Hiba Bukhari as Dua Nosherwan Ghaznavi
- Haroon Shahid as Faraz
- Hiba Ali as Kashmala
- Sajid Hasan as Aslam
- Hina Bayat as Amma Saeein
- Mahmood Aslam as Baba Saeein
