= Silsilay =

Pakistani television drama series

- Cover
- Genre: Family drama Love Story
- Created by: Faysal Manzoor
- Written by: Samra Bukhari
- Directed by: Syed Wajahat Hussain
- Starring: Junaid Khan; Hiba Bukhari; Momal Sheikh; Muneeb Butt
- Theme music composer: Naveed Nashad
- Opening theme: Nirmal Roy; Naveed Nashad
- Country of origin: Pakistan
- Original language: Urdu
- No. of episodes: 28

Production
- Producer: Erum Binte Shahid
- Production location: Pakistan
- Running time: Approx 40 Minutes
- Production company: DramayBaaz Productions

Original release
- Network: Geo Entertainment
- Release: 2 January – 31 July 2018

Silsilay (Urdu: سلسلے, lit. 'Situations') is a Pakistani drama series written by Samra Bukhari and directed by Iman Khan Hussain. The show features Junaid Khan, Hiba Bukhari, Momal Sheikh, Muneeb Butt in the lead roles. The drama was first aired 2 January 2018 on Geo Entertainment.

== Plot ==
This drama depicts the life of two sisters, Abeeha and Hira. Abeeha (Momal Sheikh) and Shahzaib (Muneeb Butt) are childhood friends and neighbours but Abeeha (Momal Sheikh)is in one-sided love with Shahzaib (Muneeb Butt). However, Shahzaib falls in love with Rohi ( Maryam Noor). The other story is about Hira (Hiba Bukhari) who falls in love with her cousin Jawad (Junaid Khan). However, Jawad decides to marry Ujala (Sara Bhatti). She disrupts Hira and Abeeha's life, she belongs to very rich family. Hira decides to leave her family because of Ujala but later she realizes that her family and mother were right and she returns to her home. Later on Jawad realizes that Ujala is not right for him or perfect and he breaks up with her. He realises that Hira is in love with him and he decides to marry her. Shahzaib (Muneeb Butt) also falls in love with Abeeha but he didn't know about it, Rohi realized that he is in love with Abeeha. And after that Abeeha and Shahzaib & Hira andJawad get married.

== Cast ==
- Junaid Khan as Jawad
- Hiba Bukhari as Hira
- Momal Sheikh as Abeeha
- Muneeb Butt as Shahzaib
- Shagufta Ejaz as Tanzila
- Seemi Raheel as Naila
- Mehmood Aslam as Ateeque
- Sara Bhatti as Ujala
- Mahjabeen Habeeb as Sammiya
- Abdullah Ejaz as Wahab
- Maryam Noor as Roohi
- Najia Baig
- Owais Shaikh as Jami (servant)
