= Asad Qureshi (producer) =

Pakistani producer

- Born: Asad Amin Qureshi; 15 December 1978 (age 47); Karachi, Pakistan
- Occupations: Television and Film producer
- Known for: 7th Sky Entertainment
- Office: COO of Geo Entertainment
- Website: 7th Sky Entertainment

Asad Qureshi, is a Pakistani producer, and Chief Operating Officer (COO) of Geo Entertainment, a leading entertainment television network of Pakistan.

Asad Qureshi is also a producer at 7th Sky Entertainment.

== Career ==
After graduating from Institute of Business Management (IoBM), Qureshi attended University of Southern California and IESE Business School. As reported by The News, "Asad Qureshi has played an instrumental role in bringing innovation to the Pakistan media industry." Since 2004 he has been the director and founding partner of 7th Sky Entertainment. Abdullah Kadwani and Asad Qureshi under the banner of 7th Sky Entertainment has been belting out successive hits.
