= A-Plus TV =

Pakistani television channel

A-Plus Entertainment HD (Pakistan)
- A-PLUS logo since 2017
- Country: Pakistan
- Broadcast area: Asia, Europe, Middle East, America's
- Headquarters: Lahore, Punjab, Pakistan

Programming
- Language: Urdu
- Picture format: 4:3 (1080P, HDTV)

Ownership
- Sister channels: Public News

History
- Launched: 24 July 2009; 17 years ago

Availability

Streaming media
- A-Plus TV Live: Watch Live

A-Plus TV is a Pakistani entertainment TV channel. Its chairman is Abdul Jabbar. It is a major entertainment channel in Pakistan.

A-Plus presents a mix of programs ranging from drama serials, sitcoms, soaps, music shows, reality shows, morning shows, talk shows, health shows and magazine shows.

The channel is known for its dramas such as Aunn Zara, Gohar-e-Nayab, Mera Naam Yousuf Hai, Shehr-e-Ajnabi and Khuda Dekh Raha Hai.

== Currently broadcast ==
=== Rerun of ended series ===
- Gohar-e-Nayab

== Formerly broadcast ==
=== Horror/supernatural ===
- Dil Nawaz

=== Drama serials ===
- Adhura Milan
- Ahl-e-Wafa
- Aik Aur Sitam Hai
- Aankh Salamat Andhay Log
- Aunn Zara
- Bhai
- Daray Daray Naina
- Deedan
- Dil-e-Bereham
- Dumpukht - Aatish-e-Ishq
- Faltu Larki
- Farwa Ki ABC
- Ghalti
- Ghamand
- Gohar-e-Nayab
- GT Road
- Haara Dil
- Inteha e Ishq
- Intezaar
- Is Chand Pe Dagh Nahin
- Ishq Mein Kaafir
- Jaan'nisar
- Kahan Ho Tum
- Karam Jali
- Khafa Khafa Zindagi
- Khuda Dekh Raha Hai
- Khuda Gawah
- Kountry Luv
- Laal Ishq
- Laikin
- Lamhay
- Main Mar Gai Shaukat Ali
- Marasim
- Meherbaan
- Mera Naam Yousuf Hai
- Mere Bewafa
- Mujhe Beta Chahiye
- Noor
- Pehchaan
- Pheeki Theek Kehta Hai
- Pinjra
- Qadam Qadam Ishq
- Shehryar Shehzadi
- Takkabur
- Thays
- Yeh Mera Deewanapan Hai

=== Soap operas ===
- Chandan Haar
- Love, Life Aur Lahore

=== Talk show/morning shows ===
- Morning With Sahir

=== Acquired ===
==== Turkish ====
- Ummeed

==== Indian dramas ====
- Aahat
- Anhoniyon Ka Andhera
- Bandhan
- Bepannah
- C.I.D.
- Code Red
- Dil Se Di Dua
- Dance India Dance
- Gustakh Dil
- Jaane Kya Baat Hui
- Koi Aane Ko Hai
- Mere Rang Mein Rangne Waali
- Sone Ki Chiriya
- Jhalak Dikhhla Jaa
- Junoon
- Junoon – Aisi Nafrat Toh Kaisa Ishq
- Sab Se Sohna Isshq
- Tashan-e-Ishq
- Thakur Girls

==== Children Series ====
- Storm Hawks
- G.I. Joe: Sigma 6
- G.I. Joe: Renegades

=== Films distributed ===
A-Plus distributed its first film Good Morning Karachi in January 2015 under the banner of A-Plus Films.

Film Name	Year
Good Morning Karachi	2015
Balu Mahi	2017
