= Bilal Abbas Khan =

Pakistani actor (born 1993)

- بلال عباس خان
- Born: June 4, 1993 (age 33); Karachi, Sindh, Pakistan
- Citizenship: Pakistani
- Occupation: Actor
- Years active: 2016–present

Bilal Abbas Khan is a Pakistani actor who works in Urdu television and films. Known for portraying diverse characters. Khan was featured among 30 under 30 global Asian stars in 2021. His accolades include three Lux Style Awards.

Khan first received attention as a second lead in the romantic thriller Dumpukht - Aatish-e-Ishq (2016) and rose to prominence with the romantic drama O Rangreza (2017), the thriller Balaa (2018), the revenge drama Cheekh (2019) and the military action telefilm Laal (2019). His career progressed further with the comedy-drama Pyar Ke Sadqay (2020), the romance Dobara (2021) and the historical film Khel Khel Mein, winning three Lux Style Awards for Best Actor. He also played against type in the mystery thriller Dunk (2020) and had a starring role in the comedy Kuch Ankahi (2023). Khan gained critical praise for starring in the light-hearted romance Ishq Murshid and miniseries Mann Jogi (both 2024) with the former earned him the Hum Award for Best Actor Popular.

== Early life and education ==
Bilal Abbas Khan was born on 4 June 1993 in Karachi, Sindh. His father, Sohail Abbas, is a civil servant, who earlier served as a DSP in the Sindh Police, and is presently serving as Excise and Taxation Officer in the Excise, Taxation and Narcotics Control Department of Sindh, and his mother, Farhana Sohail, is a fashion designer. He has two brothers, one elder and one younger, and an elder sister.

Raised in Karachi, where he received his early education, he was later on sent to a boarding school, Lawrence College in Murree, where he took part in theater plays, which inspired a desire in him to pursue a career in acting. He later joined the Shaheed Zulfikar Ali Bhutto Institute of Science and Technology in Karachi to study marketing, and graduated in 2015.

Khan formally studied acting at the National Academy of Performing Arts. Mainly inspired by Viola Spolin's "great focus on improvisation and improvisational techniques", Khan started his acting career in 2016 with commercial modelling and later auditioned for television roles.

== Career ==
=== Early work and breakthrough (2016–2018) ===
Khan made his acting debut with a minor role in the 2016 soap opera Khushaal Susral, and subsequently received praise for his role as a second lead opposite Sonia Mishal in the social drama Dumpukht - Aatish-e-Ishq in the same year. He then played a supporting role in the Hum TV's religious drama Saya-e-Dewar Bhi Nahi, alongside an ensemble cast of Naveen Waqar, Ahsan Khan and Emmad Irfani. Directed by Shahzad Kashmiri, he played a spoiled brat who hated his parents for neglecting and abandoning him.

Khan received wide recognition for playing a man betrayed by his elder brother (played by Sami Khan) by marrying his love interest (played by Armeena Khan) in the romantic drama Rasm E Duniya, that aired on ARY Digital in 2017. His next role was that of a murdered victim in the courtroom drama Saanp Seerhi. The series was based on the novel of the same name, written by Umera Ahmed, and also starred Samina Peerzada and Madiha Imam, who played his mother and love interest respectively. His breakout role came with the romantic comedy drama O Rangreza (2017), in which he starred as an introvert, raised by his strict uncle (Noman Ijaz), who falls in love with his daughter (Sajal Aly). Mahwash Ajaz of Samaa wrote that Khan portrayed his character without "being repetitive" and that he is the "master of [his] craft". The series topped the rating upon its airing and earned him further recognition, as well as the Hum Award for Best Supporting Actor nomination.

Further popularity came with the role of a family-oriented guy married to a selfish wife (played by Ushna Shah) in the thriller Balaa (2018), which earned him the ARY Media Awards for Best Actor and a Lux Style Award for Best Television Actor nomination. Daily Times called him the "master performer of this age", and ARY News said that "Bilal continues to go from strength to strength" and labeled him as an "amazing actor".

=== Critical recognition (2019–2023) ===
The 2019 crime drama Cheekh, was one of the most successful and acclaimed dramas of 2019. His role of an antagonist opposite Saba Qamar, was well-received by the critics as well as by the public, establishing Khan as a leading actor in Urdu television. Daily Times stated that Khan is "scary as the coldblooded murderer", while Mangobaaz labelled him as "a modern day masterpiece". At the annual Lux Style Awards, he received another Best Television Actor nomination. He next starred as a Naval officer in the patriotic military-based telefilm Laal, which was aired on television on the occasion of Pakistan Day.

Khan began 2020 with the role of a dumb but mathematics genius in the comedy drama Pyar Ke Sadqay, opposite Yumna Zaidi. The series as well as his performance was widely praised by the public and the critics. The Nation said that Khan has raised the "bar high" for his performance in the series. His next appearance was opposite Madiha Imam in Mehreen Jabbar's social comedy web-series Aik Jhooti Love Story, as a computer hardware technician who unknowingly romances his neighbour through an online profile with a fake persona. The web-series, written by Umera Ahmed, was streamed on the Indian video on demand service, called Zee5. Critical opinion on his acting prowess was overwhelming; critic Maliha Rehman of Dawn wrote, "Bilal has been proving his acting brilliance for some time now, completely personifying every character that he plays. In Aik Jhooti Love Story, he transforms completely into Sohail, bringing an earthy, very real sweetness to his role. For his performance he received his first Best TV Actor (Critics' Choice) at the 20th Lux Style Awards.

Khan concluded the year with the #MeToo movement-based thriller series Dunk, where he played the hot-headed love interest of Sana Javed's character, alongside her, Noman Ijaz, and Yasra Rizvi. Based on a real-life story of a family in Sargodha, Dunk generated controversy when its producer, Fahad Mustafa, stated against the sexual harassment cases, citing that many of the men are falsely accused. Muna Moini of Something Haute found the series to be "a multi-layered drama full of powerful performances." Khan received another Best TV Actor (Popular) and (Critics) nomination at the 21st Lux Style Awards.

In 2021, he played the lead in his second film, the historical drama Khel Khel Mein, opposite Sajal Aly and directed by Nabeel Qureshi. It received mixed reviews and was a commercial failure. The same year, he starred as Maahir, a carefree and jobless bachelor in Hum TV's romance Dobaara opposite Hadiqa Kiani. Afreen Seher of the DAWN Images criticised the series for prioritizing wealth over its intended romantic storyline, reducing the protagonist's worth to her possessions, but appreciates its initial attempt at a refreshing narrative featuring a middle-aged woman remarrying a younger man by choice. His performance earned him the 22nd Lux Style Awards for Best TV Actor (Critics' choice). After a year gap, in 2023, he was seen playing a realtor Salman in the light-hearted comedy drama Kuch Ankahi, where he reunited with Sajal Aly. Comparing it with the most viewed Pakistani serials of 2023, Aurora praised its writing, themes and acting performances. Khan continued his streek and received 23rd Lux Style Awards for Best TV Actor (Viewers' Choice) nomination for the consecutive fifth time. In the year-ender list by Dawn Images, the reviewer praised the performances of the actors and the subtle messaging in the series.

=== Ishq Murshid and beyond expansion (2024–present) ===
Later in 2024, Khan appeared as Shahmeer Sikandar in Hum TV's romantic drama Ishq Murshid, opposite Durefishan Saleem. The series received mixed reviews from the critics, but Khan was widely praised by the audiences and the critics in Pakistan and India. The Reviewer praised Khan's transition between two characters and called it as "effortless" . Ishq Murshid went on to become of the most watched Pakistani serials of 2024, achieving a TRP rating of 22.3, the highest for the network. At the 10th Hum Awards he received the Best Actor Popular and Best Onscreen Couple with Durefishan Saleem. Khan then appeared in India’s Zee Zindagi series Abdullahpur Ka Devdas opposite Sarah Khan. His final appearance of the year was in the miniseries Mann Jogi, which dealt with the exploitation of the Islamic practice of Nikah Halala by individuals for personal gain. Gaitee Ara Siddiqi of The News International called Khan "brilliant" in the series."

His last release of 2025, came with ARY Digital's romance drama Meri Zindagi Hai Tu which is currently on-air where he starred as Kamyar Sohail, a charming yet impulsive man scarred by betrayal and unable to form lasting bonds opposite Hania Aamir for the first time.

== Public image ==
In December 2020, Khan was selected by the UK magazine Eastern Eye as one of the "Top 50 Asian celebrities", along with four other Pakistani celebrities, and was labelled as the "fastest rising acting star in Pakistan" by the magazine.

In 2021, Eastern Eye featured him in its list of "30 under 30 Global Asian Stars", along with four other Pakistani celebrities.

== Filmography ==
=== Films ===
Year	Title	Role	Director	Notes	Ref(s)
2017	Thora Jee Le	Party Khan	Rafay Rashdi	Debut film	
2021	Khel Khel Mein	Saad	Nabeel Qureshi		

=== Television ===
Year	Title	Role	Director	Notes	Ref.
2016	Khushaal Susral	Hamza	Shahid Younus		
2016	Dumpukht - Aatish-e-Ishq	Bilal	Kashif Nisar		
2016	Saya-e-Dewar Bhi Nahi	Afaaq	Shahzad Kashmiri		
2016	Kitni Girhain Baaki Hain	Munney Mian	Angeline Malik	Episode: Maa Jaisi	
2016	Bay Khudi	Arsam	Aabis Raza		
2017	Rasm E Duniya	Faaris	Roomi Insha		
2017	Saanp Seerhi	Mohid	Misbah Khalid		
2017	Qurban	Jamal	Ahmed Bhatti		
2017	O Rungreza	Mohammad Qasim	Kashif Nisar		
2017	Yeh Ishq Hai	Sheheryar	Badar Mehmood	Episode: Tum Na Miltay Tu	
2018	Balaa	Taimoor Javed	Badar Mehmood		
2019	Cheekh	Wajih Taseer	Badar Mehmood		
2020	Pyar Ke Sadqay	Abdullah Shahbaz	Farooq Rind		
2020	Dunk	Haider Nawaz	Badar Mehmood		
2021	Dobara	Maahir Jahangir	Danish Nawaz		
2023	Kuch Ankahi	Salman Saeed	Nadeem Baig		
2023	Ishq Murshid	Shahmeer Sikandar / Fazal Baksh (Note: Khan played a single character with two or more names.)	Farooq Rind		
2024	Mann Jogi	Muhammad Ibrahim	Kashif Nisar	Mini Series	
2025	Meri Zindagi Hai Tu	Kamyar Sohail	Musaddiq Malek		
2027	Lahu †	TBA	Syed Wajahat Hussain		

=== Web series ===
Year	Title	Role	Notes	Ref(s)
2020	Ek Jhoothi Love Story	Sohail	Release on Zee5	
2024	Abdullahpur Ka Devdas	Fakhar Wazir	Release on Zee Zindagi	

=== Telefilms ===
Year	Title	Role	Network	Ref(s)
2016	Aashiq Colony	Aashiq	ARY Digital	
2017	Mohabbat Hogayee Aakhir	Hamza	ARY Digital	
2017	Aitebaar	Ahmed	Geo Entertainment	
2018	Weham	Shahzad	Hum TV	
2019	Laal	Behram	Geo Entertainment	

== Awards and nominations ==
Year	Award	Category	Work	Result	Ref(s)
2018	6th Hum Awards	Best Supporting Actor	O Rangreza	Nominated	
2018	6th Hum Awards	Best Onscreen Couple - Popular (with Sajal Aly)	O Rangreza	Won	
2018	6th Hum Awards	Best Onscreen Couple - Jury (with Sajal Aly)	O Rangreza	Nominated	
2019	ARY Media Awards	Best Actor	Balaa	Won	
2019	Social Media Awards	Best Actor	Balaa	Won	
2019	19th Lux Style Awards	Best TV Actor	Balaa	Nominated	
2019	19th Lux Style Awards	Best TV Actor	Cheekh	Nominated	
2021	20th Lux Style Awards	Best TV Actor (Critics' Choice)	Pyar Ke Sadqay	Won	
2021	20th Lux Style Awards	Best TV Actor (Viewers' Choice)	Pyar Ke Sadqay	Nominated	
2022	21st Lux Style Awards	Best Film Actor	Khel Khel Mein	Won	
2022	21st Lux Style Awards	Best TV Actor (Viewers' Choice)	Dunk	Nominated	
2022	21st Lux Style Awards	Best TV Actor (Critics' Choice)	Dunk	Nominated	
2023	22nd Lux Style Awards	Best TV Actor (Critics' choice)	Dobaara	Won	
2024	9th Hum Awards	Best Actor	Dobaara	Won	
2024	9th Hum Awards	Best Onscreen Couple (with Hadiqa Kiani)	Dobaara	Nominated	
2024	1st Kya Drama Hai Icon Awards	Best Actor - Popular	Kuch Ankahi	Nominated	
2025	23rd Lux Style Awards	Best TV Actor (Viewers' Choice)	Kuch Ankahi	Nominated	
2025	2nd Kya Drama Hai Icon Awards	Best Actor (Critics’ Choice)	Mann Jogi	Nominated	
2025	2nd Kya Drama Hai Icon Awards	Best Actor (Popular Choice)	Ishq Murshid	Nominated	
2025	10th Hum Awards	Best Actor - Popular	Ishq Murshid	Won	
2025	10th Hum Awards	Best Actor - Jury	Ishq Murshid	Nominated	
2025	10th Hum Awards	Best Onscreen Couple - Popular (with Durefishan Saleem)	Ishq Murshid	Won	
2025	10th Hum Awards	Best Onscreen Couple - Jury (with Durefishan Saleem)	Ishq Murshid	Won	
2025	24th Lux Style Awards	Best Actor of the Year	Ishq Murshid	Nominated	
2026	3rd Pakistan International Screen Awards	Best TV Actor - Popular	Ishq Murshid	Nominated	
2026	3rd Pakistan International Screen Awards	Best TV Actor (Critics' Choice)	Ishq Murshid	Nominated	
2026	3rd Pakistan International Screen Awards	Best Onscreen Couple Popular (with Durefishan Saleem)	Ishq Murshid	Nominated	
