= Cheekh =

2019 Pakistani TV series

- Genre: Drama; Crime
- Created by: Eithan Hizkiya
- Written by: Zanjabeel Asim Shah
- Directed by: Badar Mehmood
- Starring: Saba Qamar; Emmad Irfani; Bilal Abbas; Aijaz Aslam; Azekah Daniel
- Theme music composer: Waqar Ali
- Opening theme: "Mere Maula"; Singer; Asrar; Lyricist; Sabir Zafar
- Country of origin: Pakistan
- Original language: Urdu
- No. of seasons: 1
- No. of episodes: 30

Production
- Producers: Fahad Mustafa; Dr. Ali Kazmi
- Production locations: Karachi, Sindh
- Editor: Masood Khan
- Camera setup: Multi-camera setup
- Running time: Approximately 40 minutes
- Production company: Big Bang Entertainment

Original release
- Network: ARY Digital
- Release: 5 January – 10 August 2019

Cheekh (Urdu: چیخ; lit: 'Scream') is a 2019 Pakistani crime-drama television series created and produced by Fahad Mustafa and Dr. Ali Kazmi under their production house, Big Bang Entertainment. It features Saba Qamar and Bilal Abbas in lead roles and Aijaz Aslam, Maira Khan, Emmad Irfani and Azekah Daniel in supportive roles. The serial originally began airing on ARY Digital on January 5, 2019. It was acclaimed by critics and viewers and was one of the most successful shows of ARY Digital at the time.

== Plot ==
Mannat (Saba Qamar), Haya (Azekah Daniel), and Nayab (Ushna Shah) are close friends. Wajih (Bilal Abbas Khan), Yawer (Aijaz Aslam), Shayaan (Emmad Irfani), and Haya are siblings. Mannat is married to Shayaan who comes from a wealthy family. Nayab is poor and lives with her father Ramzaan (Noor-ul-Hassan), greedy step-mother (Saima Qureshi) and her two step-sisters.

Nayab falls off the roof on the night of Haya's engagement and people assume she attempted suicide. Nayab is rushed to the hospital and it is revealed that someone was physically violent with her and attempted to rape her before pushing her off the roof. As Nayab breathes her last, she indicates in her testimony before Mannat and the police the identity of her assailant by calling him 'Raja' (a nickname which the women in the family jokingly use for Wajih).

Yawer, who always thinks blood is thicker than water, suspects Wajih but tries to help him secretly by asking his family to not get involved with the case. Mannat does not believe it at first until Wajih confesses it to her face himself. He tells her that on Haya's engagement night, he called Nayab on the terrace and indirectly asked her for sexual favours, but Nayab rejected him and told him to stay away from her. Wajih's ego is hurt as no other girl has rejected him before and that now Mannat and everyone else will find out Wajih's true colours, he pushes Nayab from the rooftop. Mannat is shocked and devastated; she struggles to not file a report with information because of familial relations but Wajih terrorises Mannat and Ramzaan so much that she finally files an F.I.R against him which creates havoc in her relationship with her in-laws. Wajih also reveals the truth to Yawer; Yawer, who is infertile and sees Wajih as his son, forgets his sins and promises to protect him no matter what and hires a lawyer for him.

Everyone breaks all ties with Mannat and forces her to take the case back including Shayaan but based on the arguments and how Mannat is being treated, he is confused about whom to support. Wajih falsely accuses Mannat of dating Haya's fiancé, which Haya believes. Her fiancé, seeing that Haya has no trust in him and her best friend, breaks off the engagement and parts ways with Haya forever. Before leaving, he informs Shayaan that Mannat is innocent and that he should take her far away from all this. Shayaan finally believes Mannat and they move out of the house and Mannat threatens the family to get Wajih hung to death. After the first court hearings, Wajih with his lawyer's support, uploads a video to the internet in which he claims that Mannat asked him for sexual favours and since he rejected her, she is defaming him by blaming him for Nayab's death as revenge. This action causes Haya and Shehwar, Yawar's wife to question Wajih's intentions and question if he is really innocent. Shewar upon visiting her gynecologist, realises that Yawar is the one who is infertile (earlier he created fake documents to make Shewar infertile as he didn't have the guts to face the humiliation). In the heat of an argument with Shehwar, Yawar divorces her.

Mannat becomes pregnant but, she starts getting stressed and becomes emotionally strained because of the case. Haya reconciles with Mannat and Shayaan and after getting to know that Ramzaan and his family is homeless because of her family, starts helping them out financially. One day, when Mannat was walking back to her home at night, Wajih confronts and follows her in his car which causes her to fall on the ground, which causes a miscarriage. Shayaan shares his sorrows with Yawar, who upset by this news, confronts Wajih. Mannat becomes hopeless and exhausted as she lost her family, respect and child because of this case, decides to give up because she can't see Shayaan suffer anymore. But Shayan, who was also equally heartbroken, motivates her and asks her to fight for their unborn child.

Seeing their determination, Wajih's lawyer starts terrorising and blackmailing Mannat's mother who out of fear, appears in the court and tells everyone a fake story of Mannat being mentally unwell and makes up imaginary stories since birth. This results in the judge making the decision in Wajih's favour and Mannat is sent to a mental hospital. Shayan is heartbroken. When Mannat's mother visits to explain her reason for making a false statement, Mannat ignores her completely which causes her mother leaves with a heavy heart and pass away in her sleep. Mannat is inconsolable and yells that she was angry at her but didn't ever want this. Wajih also comes and visits her, apologizing for his actions and saying that he had to do this in order to save himself. Mannat gets mad at him and is calmed down by the staff in the asylum. Wajih's lawyer uses this opportunity and asks the doctor at the asylum keep Mannat in this drugged up state so that she doesn't cause any problems for them in the future. A few days later, Shayaan finally is able to take her home.

A friend of Wajih, Shariq, makes Haya hide behind the wall and gets Wajih to admit everything. Haya is shocked and regrets that she didn't believe Mannat and Ramzaan. Shayaan confronts Wajih and they start a brawl. Wajih losing control over his actions, pushes Shayaan who falls on a glass table, causing it to shatter and pierce his neck. Wajih runs away but is guilty of what he has done. Shayan soon dies in the hospital and Yawar who is upset with Wajih's role in it, requests the police to take the statement but Mannat tells them that it was just an accident and no one's responsible for it. When Wajih confronts her about it, she responds that there's no way she will let a small statement make up for the loss of her respect, her child, her mother and her husband. She threatens that as her iddat(mourning) period comes to an end, she will bring him to a point where he will confess all his crimes in the court. A grieving Yawer suffers a stroke and is now paralyzed.

Mannat starts terrorising Wahij in different ways who is already guilty about Sheyaan's death, Yawar's paralysis and stressed about handing the business by himself. Mannat gives a statement to the police saying that if anything will happen to her, Wajih is responsible for it. Therefore, Wajih can't retaliate or cause her any hysical harm. She also starts collecting proofs to present in the court as she reopens the case. Wajih goes the S.H.O who had unlawfully helped him previously because of bribery but the S.H.O refuses to help him without a bribe. Disappointed, Wajih goes to his lawyer who agrees to take the case once again.

Mannat is given permission by the court to represent herself. She shows all her proofs, presents witnesses and lastly, in a heated argument with Wajih where she twists the situation, Wajih subconsciously spits the truth. Seeing no way out, he tells the truth and says that as he was never objected by Yawer and given everything he demanded, even if its wrong, and believed that no matter what he does, he will be backed up and saved, caused him to develop this sick mentality. He is taken to the jail where Haya, Yawer and Shariq (now Haya's husband) tearfully hug him before the police come and take him to be hanged. Mannat is seen smiling and is telling herself that whatever loss she had gone through just to see this day (Wajih being hanged) were tests of Allah and if she would've kept quiet like everyone else, she would've lost dignity for herself in her eyes, and is satisfied supporting the oppressed.

== Cast ==
- Saba Qamar as Mannat Shayan: Shayan's wife; Wajih, Yawer, and Haya's sister-in-law; Nayab's friend.
- Bilal Abbas Khan as Wajih Taseer: Haya, Yawer, and Shayan's younger brother; Mannat's brother-in-law.
- Aijaz Aslam as Yawer Taseer: Haya, Shayan, and Wajih's elder brother; Shewar's husband.
- Emmad Irfani as Dr. Shayan Taseer: Mannat's husband; Wajih, Haya, and Yawar's brother; Shehwar's brother-in-law.
- Maira Khan as Shehwar: Yawer's wife; Wajih, Shayaan, and Haya's sister-in-law.
- Azekah Daniel as Haya Shariq: Mannat and Nayab's friend; Wajih, Yawar, and Shayaan's sister.
- Ushna Shah as Nayab; Mannat and Haya's friend (Episodes 1–3).
- Gul-e-Rana as Mannat's mother.
- Noor-ul-Hassan as Ramzaan: Nayab's father; Shamsa's husband.
- Saima Qureshi as Shamsa; Nayab's step-mother, Ramzaan's second wife.
- Nayyar Ejaz as Inspector Aamir Khan.
- Shabbir Jan as Lawyer.
- Junaid Akhter as Asad: Haya's ex-fiancé; Mannat and Nayaab's friend.
- Shehryar Zaidi as Sulaiman; Asad's father. (Episodes 9–11)
- Birjees Farooqui as Asad's mother. (Episodes 9–10)
- Asfar Khan as Wajih's driver.
- Laiba Khan as Nayab's younger step-sister

== Production ==
On being asked about why she chose the character of Mannat, Qamar told ARY News, "If I can connect with a character, I do it and If I don’t, I opt out." A Badar Mehmood's directorial and produced by Big Bang Entertainment, who had previously taken initiative against social issues through their serials Aisi Hai Tanhai, Mubarak Ho Beti Hui Hai, and Meri Guriya. In early October 2018, Qamar posted a video about being a part of the project. Bilal Abbas Khan was chosen for playing the antagonist, along with Azekah Daniel, Aijaz Aslam, Emmad Irfani as supporting cast, while Ushna Shah came in as an extended cameo role. It marks the second on-screen appearance of Khan, Daniel and Shah after Balaa. The first teaser of the drama, which was a narration, features some of the renowned actors and personalities, including Sharmeen Obaid Chinoy, Sanam Baloch, Sarwat Gilani, Maria Wasti, Sania Saeed, Shaista Lodhi, and Marina Khan.

== Reception ==
The show became a popular serial in Pakistan after airing its first few episodes. It started off very well, averaging 6.4 TRPs. The first episode gained 7.5, while second episode gained 7.2. The role of Qamar and Khan was appreciated by critics. A reviewer from The Express Tribune wrote, "Her (Qamar)'s performance clearly stands out from other cast members, especially her dialogue delivery and outstanding facial expressions". Sheeba Khan of DAWN wrote about Khan's performance as praise-worthy while criticized the story, saying, "I fail to understand why writers insist on making mothers so weak". According to the review of The Nation, it was the third blockbuster serial for Khan after O Rangreza and Balaa. Critics also praised the character of Shayan, portrayed by Emmad Irfani. A reviewer from DAWN called him a "New Pakistani Hero".

=== Ratings ===
Episode	Broadcast date	Weekly rank (in ratings)	Television Rating Points (TRP)	YouTube viewership (in millions)(in viewership)
1	5 January 2019	1	7.4	7.6
2	12 January 2019	1	7.2	5.1
3	19 January 2019	1	7.84	4.3
4	26 January 2019	1	7.84	4.7
5	2 February 2019	1	7.92	4.8
6	9 February 2019	1	7.7	4.5
7	16 February 2019	1	7.21	4.2
8	23 February 2019	1	7.1	4.7
9	2 March 2019	1	7.2	3.9

== Soundtrack ==
Cheekh - OST

Soundtrack album by Asrar
- Released: 25 January 2019
- Recorded: 2019
- Genre: Television soundtrack
- Length: (4:32)
- Language: Urdu
- Label: ARY Digital

Music video
- "Cheekh" OST on YouTube

The title song is Mere Maula, sung and composed by Asrar. The lyrics were written by Sabir Zafar.

== Awards and nominations ==
Year	Award	Category	Recipient(s)	Result	Ref.
February 7, 2020	Pakistan International Screen Awards	Best Television Play	Big Bang Entertainment	Nominated	
February 7, 2020	Pakistan International Screen Awards	Best Television Director	Badar Mehmood	Nominated	
February 7, 2020	Pakistan International Screen Awards	Best Television Actress	Saba Qamar	Nominated	
February 7, 2020	Pakistan International Screen Awards	Best Television Actress- Critics choice	Saba Qamar	Nominated	
February 7, 2020	Pakistan International Screen Awards	Best Television Actor- Critics choice	Bilal Abbas Khan	Nominated	
December 31, 2020	Lux Style Awards	Best TV Actor- Critics Choice	Bilal Abbas Khan	Nominated	
December 31, 2020	Lux Style Awards	Best TV Actor- Viewer's Choice	Bilal Abbas Khan	Nominated	
December 31, 2020	Lux Style Awards	Best TV Actress- Critics Choice	Saba Qamar	Nominated	
December 31, 2020	Lux Style Awards	Best TV Actress- Viewer's Choice	Saba Qamar	Nominated	
December 31, 2020	Lux Style Awards	Best TV Play	Big Bang Entertainment	Nominated	
