= Oye Kuch Kar Guzar =

- Film cover
- Directed by: Harris Rasheed
- Written by: Harris Rasheed
- Produced by: Syed Zaheer Uddin; Emad Ishaq Khan
- Starring: Ali Safina; Uzair Jaswal; Ushna Shah; Mahjabeen Habib
- Edited by: Imran Mushtaq
- Music by: Jamal Rahman
- Production company: djuice
- Distributed by: iD creations
- Release date: 3 December 2016
- Country: Pakistan
- Language: Urdu

Oye Kuch Kar Guzar is a 2016 Pakistani online comedy film by djuice Pakistan, directed and written by Harris Rasheed and produced by Syed Zaheer Uddin and Emad Ishaq Khan. It is the first Pakistani online film. The film was released on YouTube on 3 December 2016.

== Cast ==
- Ali Safina as Shamsher Iqbaldin/Sherry
- Uzair Jaswal as Junaid Hafeez Sarhadi/Jango
- Ushna Shah as Zara Hayat Khan (Xara)
- Mahjabeen Habib as Shabnam Mushtaq Chaudary

== Episodes ==
The films has 5 episodes. Each episode except the last one has 2 options to select online for the next episode on YouTube.

#	Episode Title	Option 1	Option 2
1	Episode 1 - The Journey Begins	Chain Khainchain	Chain Na Khainchain
2	Episode 2 - Na Durr	Intezar Na Karain	Intezar Karain
3	Episode 3 - Bum Mein Dum	Train Ka Intezar	Sangeen Ki Sawari
4	Episode 4 - Sangeen Twist	Pakray Jayen	Bhag Jayen
5	Episode 5 - Daaku Roulette	—N/a	—N/a

== Shooting ==
The film was shot in Kallar Kahar (Chakwal), Katas Fort, Haveli Sardar Jawala Singh Sandu Padhana (Lahore) and Lahore Railway Station.

== Soundtrack ==
- Chal Chal Chaltay Jana
- Parindey
- Anger Management
- Too Young For Guns
