= Choti =

Choti or chotis may refer to:

- Choti (TV series), or Chhoti, a 2014–2015 Pakistani television drama serial that aired on Geo Entertainment
- Sikha, a religious hairstyle worn by orthodox Hindus
- Chotis, (Spanicization of schottische), a partnered dance form
