= Ushna Shah =

Pakistani Urdu cinema and television actress

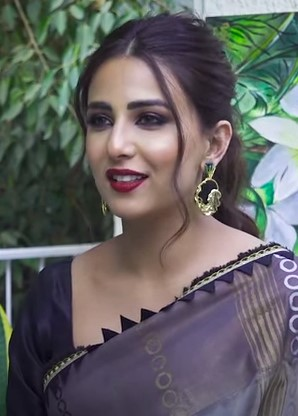
- Shah in 2021
- Born: Karachi, Sindh, Pakistan
- Education: York University
- Occupations: Actress, Television presenter
- Years active: 2012–present
- Spouse: Hamza Amin (m. 2023)
- Relatives: Irsa Ghazal (sister)

Ushna Shah is a Pakistani-Canadian film and television actress. Her accolades include a Hum Award and a Pakistan Media Award, and a nomination for Lux Style Award.

Shah graduated from the York University and made her debut with a supporting role in the 2013 romance Mere Khwabon Ka Diya, winning a Pakistan Media Award for Best Emerging Talent. After playing a series of roles, she starred as a struggling wife in the blockbuster thriller Bashar Momin (2014) and went on to feature as the female lead in the 2017 spiritual drama Alif Allah Aur Insaan and the 2018 psychological thriller Balaa, and earned further praise as a victim in the thriller Cheekh (2019), the love interest of the main character in the drama Parizaad (2022), and a naive wife in the romance Habs (2022).

== Early life ==
Shah was born in Karachi, Sindh, to Muhammad Shah, a businessman, and Ismat Tahira, a veteran actress and a radio artist. She has one elder brother, Shah Sharabeel, a theater director, and an elder half-sister from her mother's first marriage, Irsa Ghazal, another television actress. The family relocated to Toronto, when Shah was a child, where she was raised. Shah moved back to Pakistan in 2012, to pursue a career in acting. Shah graduated with a major in English Literature and Professional Writing from the York University.

== Career ==
Shah began her career with character roles, including the serial Bashar Momin in 2014, the drama serial Duaa (2015) in which she played the title character, and Alif Allah Aur Insaan (2017) in the role of a beggar turned courtesan. She was cast in Jawad Bashir's Teri Meri Love Story in which she played the leading character Eesha, but the film was halted post-production and the official release never happened. She also starred in the first online Pakistani comedy film Oye Kuch Kar Guzar by D-juice Pakistan. She then appeared as a guest in the film Punjab Nahi Jaungi in 2017. She has been the brand ambassador for the fashion label Nickie Nina, and has done campaigns for various lawn brands such as Jahanara. In June 2017 she wrote on Facebook criticizing what she said was the trend of various talk shows using Ramadan to cash in on television rating points.

== Personal life ==
Shah married professional golfer Hamza Amin, the son of golfer Taimur Hassan Amin, on 26 February 2023 in Karachi, two months after announcing her engagement.

== Filmography ==
=== Films ===
Year	Title	Role	Notes	Notes	Ref(s)
2016	Teri Meri Love Story	Esha			
2017	Oye Kuch Kar Guzar	Zara Hayat		Released online by Djuice	
2017	Punjab Nahi Jaungi	Herself		Special appearance in song "Raat Ka Nasha"	
2023	Chikkar	Ayla Akbar			
2026	Sheroes		Saqib Khan Badar Mehmood	Segment : Gear Up	

=== Television ===
Year	Title	Role	Network	Additional Notes	Ref.
2013	Mere Khwabon Ka Diya	Rahma		Debut	
2013	Shehr-e-Yaaran	Durr e Shehwar			
2013	Rukhsaar	Mahrukh			
2014	Kitni Girhain Baaki Hain	Shafeeqa		Episode "Harjai"	
2014	Aag	Momina			
2014	Hum Tehray Gunahgaar	Sara			
2014	Bashar Momin	Rudaba			
2015	Piya Mann Bhaye	Hania			
2015	Duaa	Duaa			
2016	Bheegi Palkien	Mehar Bano			
2016	Neelam Kinaray	Sakina			
2016	Bitiya Hamaray Zamanay Mein	Iraj			
2016	Ab Kar Meri Rafugari	Taban Sultan			
2016	Thoda Sa Aasman	Rakhshi			
2017	Alif Allah Aur Insaan	Rani (Reena Begum)			
2017	Yeh Ishq Hai	Tajwar		Episode "Kiya Yahi Pyaar Hai"	
2017	Kitni Girhain Baaki Hain (season 2)	Rozi/Sarah	Geo Entertainment	Episode 1, 25	
2018	Lashkara	Bubly	ARY Digital		
2018	Ru Baru Ishq Tha	Salwa	Geo Entertainment		
2018	Balaa	Nigar Taimoor	ARY Digital		
2019	Cheekh	Nayab Ramzan Ahmad	ARY Digital		
2019	Help Me Durdana	Maheen	ARY Digital		
2019	Choti Choti Batain	Pareshay (Pari)	Hum TV	Story 2	
2019	Pinky Ka Dulha	Pinky	Hum TV		
2019	Bewafa	Shireen	ARY Digital		
2020	Dikhawa	Rabia	Geo Entertainment	Episode 19	
2020	Bandhay Aik Dor Se	Maheen	Geo Entertainment		
2021	Aakhir Kab Tak	Noor	Hum TV		
2021	Parizaad	Naheed	Hum TV		
2022	Habs	Ayesha Basit Khan	ARY Digital		
2023	Daurr	Shezray Hanif	Green Entertainment		
2024	Ghair	Wafa	ARY Digital		
2024	Aye Ishq-e-Junoon	Aimen Hafeez/Aimen Rahim Nawaz	ARY Digital		
TBA	Chasing Shadows	TBA	TBA	Also Producer	

== Awards and nominations ==
- Best Emerging Talent Female at 4th Pakistan Media Awards for Mere Khwabon Ka Diya
- Hum Awards for Best Soap Actress at 3rd Hum Awards for Hum Tehray Gunahgar'
- Hum Award for Best Negative Character at 6th Hum Awards for Alif Allah Aur Insaan
- Nominated-Lux Style Awards for Best Television Actress for Balaa
