= Woh (Pakistani TV series) =

- Genre: Horror
- Written by: Syed Atif Ali
- Directed by: Angeline Malik
- Starring: (see below)
- Country of origin: Pakistan
- Original language: Urdu
- No. of seasons: 2
- No. of episodes: 21

Production
- Producer: Angeline Malik
- Running time: 40 minutes
- Production company: Angelic Films

Original release
- Network: Hum TV
- Release: 2 September 2013 – 21 November 2014

Related
- Woh

Woh (Urdu: وہ, 'That') is a Pakistani horror television series written by Syed Atif Ali and directed and produced by Angeline Malik under the banner Angelic Films. The serial has two seasons. The first season aired in 2013 on Hum TV; the second season, titled Woh Dobara, aired in 2014. The serial is considered one of the earliest works in the horror genre by the Pakistani media.

== Plot ==
=== Season 1 ===
Gohar, Mehru's mother is eager to get her married, but every proposal is rejected due to Mehru being possessed by spirits. Finally, her marriage is arranged with Faisal, a widower and father of six-year-old Saba.

Before the wedding, Mehru's brother, Javed takes her to Abdullah Shah Ghazi's shrine, where a fakir discovers her situation. He gives an amulet and prayers to Gohar to help Mehru. But due to her carelessness, she leaves the ritual midway leading to worsening of Mehru's condition.

On the night of Mehru's rukhsati, paranormal activities occur, including Mehru being locked in her room. Faisal's mother, Rukaiya witnesses Mehru as a ghost and becomes terrified. Faisal initially remains unaffected but eventually experiences strange occurrences.Gohar invites Mehru to visit the shrine again where they learn that the fakir has died. Faisal confides in a friend about the situation.

Rukaiya seeks help from a Pir by her sister Suraiya, but Suraiya's intentions are dubious. They try to force Mehru to drink holy water from the Pir, she refuses and Rukaiya throws her out. Faisal's friend consults a scholar, who agrees to help him. Faisal then meets with Gohar to understand the origin of the possession, which began when Gohar visited a graveyard during pregnancy.The scholar performs rituals to free Mehru from the possession, and eventually succeeds. However, Saba becomes possessed, having spent time with Mehru while she was possessed.

=== Season 2 ===
The story starts with Zubair, who shifts his family to a new house, where they begin the wedding arrangements of Zubair's brother Umair. The family begins to notice paranormal activity occurring around the house yet gives it no significance due to wedding preparations and celebrations.

== Series overview ==
Season	No. of episodes	Originally broadcast (Pakistan)	
Season	No. of episodes	Series premiere	Series finale
1	6	2 September 2013	7 October 2013
2	15	8 August 2014	21 November 2014

== Cast ==
=== Season 1 ===
- Arij Fatyma as Meher "Mehru"
- Shamoon Abbasi as Faisal
- Rubina Ashraf as Gohar
- Imran Ashraf as Javed
- Naila Jaffri as Ruqaiya
- Farah Nadir as Suraiya/Iram
- Fouzia Mushtaq
- Falak Naz
- Saba Qamar

=== Season 2 ===
- Yasra Rizvi as Yasmeen
- Shahood Alvi as Zubair
- Sana Askari as Iman
- Sakina Samo as Bibi Sahiba
- Sultana Zafar as Bua Begum
- Ali Abbas as Umair
- Bilal Khan as Ali
- Seema Sehr
- Naila Jaffery
- Shahid Nizami
- Saba Arif
- Fareeha Khan

== Reception ==
=== Critical reception ===
In a review of Woh, Afreen Seher of The News International praised Arij Fatyma's performance stating, she "sent shivers down our spine with her (literally and figuratively) bone-chilling performance."
