= Tapish (2026 TV series) =

2026 Pakistani television series

- Genre: Drama
- Written by: Rehana Aftab
- Directed by: Ahmed Bhatti
- Starring: Muneeb Butt; Laiba Khan; Saad Qureshi
- Country of origin: Pakistan
- Original language: Urdu
- No. of episodes: 35

Production
- Producer: Erum Binte Shahid

Original release
- Network: Geo Entertainment
- Release: 1 June – 22 September 2026

Tapish is a 2026 Pakistani television drama series written by Rehana Aftab and directed by Ahmed Bhatti. Produced by Erum Binte Shahid, the series features Muneeb Butt, Laiba Khan and Saad Qureshi in leading roles. It was broadcast on Geo Entertainment from June to September 2026.

== Plot ==
The story follows Shahzer, a wealthy young man whose assertive personality and temper affect his relationships with others. His life becomes complicated when he develops feelings for Shifa, a determined woman who has family responsibilities and personal ambitions. However, Shifa is already engaged to Maaz, Shahzer's close friend. The situation creates tension between the three characters and places their relationships under pressure.

== Cast ==
- Muneeb Butt as Shahzer Sultan
- Laiba Khan as Shifa
- Saad Qureshi as Maaz
- Saba Faisal
- Faran Tahir
- Shermeen Ali
- Syed Yörgüç Tipu Sharif
- Paras Masroor
- Amna Malik
- Imran Qureshi
- Malaika Riaz
- Komal Abbasi
- Zafar Abbas
- Babar Sultan

== Reception ==
In a television review published in Dawn on 7 June 2026, the newspaper discussed the series' central relationship conflict and Muneeb Butt's portrayal of an obsessive lover. The review also commented on the performances of Laiba Khan and Saad Qureshi.

=== Finale controversy ===
Following the conclusion of the series, writer Rehana Aftab publicly expressed disagreement with changes made to the ending. In September 2026, 24 News HD reported that Aftab had distanced herself from the finale, stating that the ending did not reflect her original script. The disagreement brought attention to questions surrounding writers' creative control in television productions.
