= Laal (film) =

2019 Pakistani military telefilm

- Official poster
- لعل
- Genre: Action; Drama
- Written by: Umera Ahmed
- Directed by: Haseeb Hassan
- Starring: Bilal Abbas; Kubra Khan; Gohar Rasheed
- Country of origin: Pakistan
- Original language: Urdu

Production
- Producer: Haseeb Hassan
- Production locations: Gawadar; Karachi
- Camera setup: Multi-camera setup 1080p
- Running time: 75 minutes
- Production companies: Hamdan Films; Geo Films

Original release
- Network: Geo Entertainment
- Release: 23 March 2019

Laal is a 2019 Pakistani military action television film written by Umera Ahmed and directed by Haseeb Hassan. It is produced by Geo Films and features Bilal Abbas Khan and Kubra Khan in leads. The original soundtrack of Laal was written and performed by Shuja Haider. The film premiered on Geo Entertainment on 23 March 2019 on the occasion of Pakistan Day. It was made available on the digital platform Amazon Prime in October 2019 and also uploaded on Pakistan Navy YouTube Channel.

== Plot ==
The story is about a young boy named Behram who lives near Ormara coastal line, Balochistan. His father works for a fishing trawler which barely aids their survival. Like his elder brother Yousuf, his father hopes for Behram to become a fisherman. But, Behram has his eyes set on another dream. Inspired by the Navy officers, he hopes to get education and join the Navy. His dreams are realised when he meets a Navy family willing to help Behram. After 15 years, Behram returns to his hometown after becoming a Naval officer. His return presents him with a life-altering challenge and demands of him a sacrifice that earns him the nation's pride (Laal).

== Cast ==
- Bilal Abbas as Behram
  - Jibraiyl Rajput (child star)
- Kubra Khan as Zarminay
  - Anoosheh Rania Khan (child star)
- Gohar Rasheed as Yousuf
  - Muzammil Shoukat (child star)
- Saleem Mairaj as Behram's father
- Iffat Rahim as Behram's mother
- Adnan Jaffer as Zarminay's father
- Sidra Niazi as Zarminay's mother

== See also ==
- Hangor S-131
- Aik Hai Nigar
- Ek Thi Marium
