= Rani (Pakistani TV series) =

Pakistani television series

- Title screen
- Genre: Drama
- Written by: Naseem Mukri
- Directed by: Angeline Malik
- Starring: Angeline Malik; Sajid Hasan; Seemi Raheel; Imran Arooj Khan; Durdana Butt
- Opening theme: Naseebo Lal
- Country of origin: Pakistan
- Original language: Urdu
- No. of seasons: 1

Production
- Production company: Angelic Films

Original release
- Network: PTV
- Release: 2007 – 2008

Rani is a 2007 Pakistani political drama serial directed by Angeline Malik, who also plays the titular character, and written by Naseem Mukri, of the Dhadkan fame.

== Plot ==
It is about the journey of a woman from innocence to a political position mostly meant for men in a male-dominated Pakistan. It is about greed, power politics, revenge and women empowerment.

== Cast ==
- Angeline Malik as Rani
- Imran Arooj Khan
- Sajid Hasan
- Sobia Kazmi
- Anjum Habibi
- Rabia Tabasum
- Seemi Raheel
- Farooq Zameer
- Durdana Butt as Rani's mother
