= Kaisi Teri Khudgarzi (TV series) =

2022 Pakistani television series

- Title screen
- Written by: Radain Shah
- Directed by: Ahmed Bhatti
- Starring: Danish Taimoor; Dur-e-Fishan Saleem; Nauman Ijaz; Atiqa Odho
- Opening theme: Kaisi Teri Khudgarzi by Rahat Fateh Ali Khan
- Country of origin: Pakistan
- Original language: Urdu
- No. of seasons: 1
- No. of episodes: 34

Production
- Producer: Abdullah Seja
- Production locations: Karachi, Sindh, Pakistan
- Camera setup: Multi-Camera setup
- Running time: 40 minutes
- Production company: IDream Entertainment

Original release
- Network: ARY Digital
- Release: 11 May – 14 December 2022

Kaisi Teri Khudgarzi (Urdu: کیسی تیری خودغرضی, lit. 'How Selfish of You') is a Pakistani television drama series produced by Abdullah Seja under the banner of iDream Entertainment. The series originally aired on ARY Digital from 11 May 2022 to 14 December 2022. It features Danish Taimoor, Dur-e-Fishan Saleem, Nauman Ijaz, and Atiqa Odho in leading roles with Laila Wasti, Shahood Alvi, Hammad Shoaib, and Zainab Qayyum in supporting roles.

Despite numerous controversies, the show achieved highest TRP of 14.0 and the show made history by crossing one billion views while still on air and is most viewed pakistani drama of all time in terms of average views per episode even surpassing the much hyped and talked Tere Bin. It was the first drama series in Pakistani history to do so.

== Plot ==
Mehak is a young woman living a middle-class life with her parents, Akram and Naheed, and her sister, Nida. Her life changes when her father confronts Shamsher, the son of the powerful and influential Dilawar, for harassing a bystander. During the confrontation, Shamsher becomes instantly obsessed with Mehak. He utilizes his family's immense wealth to dismantle Mehak’s life, eventually orchestrating the arrest of Akram and the kidnapping of Mehak's fiancé, Ahsan, on their wedding day. Exhausted by the constant state of fear, Mehak relents and agrees to marry Shamsher.

Dilawar, viewing Mehak as a gold-digger due to her social status, hires a hitman named Sheru to assassinate her on the wedding day. The plan results in a staged accident, leading Shamsher and Mehak’s family to believe she has died. However, Mehak survives and is secretly sent by Akram to Multan for protection. Meanwhile, a vengeful Ahsan shoots Shamsher, leaving him in critical condition. Upon recovering, a depressed Shamsher travels to Multan to find peace, where he unexpectedly encounters Mehak at a shrine.

Shamsher’s world is shattered when he discovers his father was behind the attempt on Mehak's life. He renounces his inheritance and family ties to marry Mehak privately. Transitioning from a life of luxury to one of poverty, Shamsher takes a job as a salesman while Mehak works in IT. During this period, Shamsher undergoes a significant character arc, transforming from an arrogant tyrant into a repentant, gentle husband. Witnessing his genuine reform and devotion, Mehak begins to develop sincere feelings for him.

The family conflict escalates when Shamsher’s mother, Mehwish, passes away after Dilawar refuses to let her see her son. Driven by persistent pride and spite, Dilawar hires another hitman to target Mehak after learning she is pregnant. As the couple leaves a hospital, Shamsher spots the assassin and shields Mehak, taking the fatal bullet himself. In his final moments at the hospital, Mehak confesses her love for him for the first time, and Shamsher dies shortly after.

In the aftermath, a guilt-ridden Dilawar publicly confesses to his crimes and commits suicide. Dilawar's lawyer informs Mehak that she has been left half of the family fortune, which she promptly donates to charity. Three years later, Mehak is seen raising her son, named Shamsher, after his father. While she remains mindful of her husband's early transgressions and strives to ensure her son does not inherit his father's initial aggression, she remains dedicated to the memory of the man Shamsher became.

== Cast ==
=== Main ===
- Danish Taimoor as Nawabzaada Shamsher Dilawar: Mehak's husband; Dilawar & Mehwish's younger son; Dara's younger brother; Shamsher Jr's father (dead).
- Dur-e-Fishan Saleem as Mehak Shamsher (née Akram) : Shamsher's widow; Akram & Naheed's older daughter; Nida's older sister; Shamsher Jr's mother.

=== Recurring ===
- Laiba Khan as Nida Ahsan (née Akram) : Akram and Naheed's younger daughter; Mehak's sister; Ahsan's wife.
- Nauman Ijaz as Nawab Dilawar: Shamsher and Dara's father; Mehwish's husband (dead).
- Atiqa Odho as Mehwish Dilawar: Shamsher and Dara's mother; Dilawar's wife (dead).
- Laila Wasti as Naheed Akram: Akram's wife; Mehak & Nida's Mother.
- Shahood Alvi as Mohammad Akram : Naheed's husband; Mehak & Nida's Father.
- Hammad Shoaib as Ahsan Ahmad: Rehan & Andaleeb's son; Mehak's ex-fiancé; Nida's Husband.
- Akhtar Hasnain as Rehan Ahmad : Akram's younger brother; Ahsan's father; Andaleeb's husband.
- Zainab Qayyum as Andaleeb Rehan: Rehan's wife; Ahsan's mother.
- Farah Nadir as Erum Bakhtyar: Bakhtyar's wife; Naheed's sister; Mehak and Nida's aunt.
- Adnan Shah Tipu as Sheru: Dilawar's servant (Dead).
- Tipu Sharif as Nawabzaada Dara Dilawar: Dilawar and Mehwish's oldest son; Shamsher's older brother; Farwa's husband.
- Ayesha Toor as Farwa Dara (née Aftab): Aftab's older daughter; Dara's wife; Sofia's older sister.
- Shehzeen Rahat as Sofia Aftab: Aftab's younger daughter; Farwa's younger sister.
- Emmad Butt as Shahmeer: Shamsher's childhood best friend.

== Production ==
The show was earlier titled Ishq-e-Junoon. The first and second teasers were released on 16 April 2022.

== Reception ==
=== Critical reception ===
Before the series premiere, Dawn expressed disappointment over the teasers by writing, "Despite negativity that was around Ishq Hai, producers are rehashing the tiresome trope of obsessive, violent love again."

On its premiere, the series received mixed criticism and reviews due to the romanticized portrayal of obsession and toxic masculinity. While reviewing the first episode negatively, a reviewer from The News International described the show as, "another run-of-the-mill play with more style than substance." Maheen A Rashdi of The Express Tribune criticised the series for glamorizing abuse, stalking, and violence against women by portraying an abusive man as a romantic lead and ultimately rewarding his behavior with a love story, and further termed it "socially irresponsible" for its normalising the toxic relationships, harmful messages, and failure to show meaningful consequences for the abuser.

=== Viewership ===
In September 2022, Daily Pakistan reported that Kaisi Teri Khudgarzi was one of the most-watched shows in Pakistan and all over the world

== Awards and nominations ==
Kaisi Teri Khudgarzi has been successfully able to sweep major nominations at the Lux Style Awards.

Award	Category	Recipients	Result
Lux Style Awards	Best TV Play (Viewers' Choice)	Kaisi Teri Khudgarzi - ARY Digital	Won
Lux Style Awards	Best Television Actor (Viewers' Choice)	Danish Taimoor	Nominated
Lux Style Awards	Best Television Actor (Critics' Choice)	Noman Ijaz	Nominated
Lux Style Awards	Best Television Track	Kaisi Teri Khudgarzi - ARY Digital	Nominated
