= Meri Zindagi Hai Tu =

2025 Pakistani television series

- Poster
- Genre: Romance
- Written by: Radain Shah
- Directed by: Musaddiq Malek
- Starring: Bilal Abbas Khan; Hania Aamir
- Theme music composer: Meri Zindagi Hai Tu by Asim Azhar
- Composer: Sabri Sister
- Country of origin: Pakistan
- Original language: Urdu
- No. of seasons: 1
- No. of episodes: 34

Production
- Producers: Humayun Saeed; Shahzad Nasib
- Production locations: Karachi, Pakistan
- Camera setup: Multi-camera setup
- Running time: 37 minutes
- Production company: Six Sigma Plus

Original release
- Network: ARY Digital
- Release: 7 November 2025 – 22 March 2026

Meri Zindagi Hai Tu (Urdu: میری زندگی ہے تو, lit. 'You are my life') is a 2025–26 Pakistani romantic drama television series, produced by Humayun Saeed and Shahzad Nasib and directed by Musaddiq Malek under the banner of Six Sigma Plus. It stars Bilal Abbas Khan and Hania Aamir side Alyy Khan, Javeria Abbasi, Ali Rehman Khan and Vardah Aziz in supporting roles. The series follows Kamyar, a charming yet impulsive man, and Ayra, a principled girl with a pure heart. What begins as a sweet connection turns into a storm of emotions, deception, and longing, testing the strength of love and trust.

== Plot ==
Ayra comes from a close knit family where relationships and family values hold the utmost importance. She is her parents' loved and obedient daughter, who has always been taught the difference between acceptable and unacceptable behaviours. She wants to make her parents proud of her. Her parents are her support system, her sister and friend are her listening ears. She is given the freedom to choose the path she wants, confident to handle the circumstances and is supported by her closed ones. She is a believer of tit for tat and she uses this tactic to redirect the people towards betterment of their lives. Though she is rude sometimes, her intention is always to be on the right side in any given situation.

Kamyar comes from a filthy rich background, where his parents are always indulged in altercations and surviving a loveless marriage. Kamyar's grandmother has been close to him always and he holds her dear. Hence, Kamyar is the person who has been neglected by his parents and to distract himself from the void in his life, he engages in activities that are not so good for the people in general. He is a charming personality who can easily flatter the women around him, yet an impulsive and rebellious man who later regrets for the decisions made earlier relating to his personal life. He is complicated to understand and this is why his parents don't take him seriously. He shares an inexplicable bond with Fariya, who has been close to him since his childhood.

Fariya is a childhood friend and an ex girlfriend of Kamyar sharing a similar affluent status as him. She is from a broken family, where her parents are divorced. As she didn't get the love, attention and care she needed as a kid, she has only one person to confide her emotions and that person is Kamyar. Fariya longs for Kamyar's presence in her life because she still have strong feelings for Kamyar; and wants her feelings to be reciprocated, where she can go to any length to get his attention and love. She understands Kamyar better than his own family and gives him the liberty to do the things he wants to do. She loves Kamyar the way he is - as a careless and impulsive person. Because these two have shared a similar background and situations, and she has always been around Kamyar through his thick and thin, their families are confident about the bond they share with each other and want them to marry each other. Fariya's father, Junaid is a DIG & an influential who loves his daughter.

Circumstances bring Ayra and Kamyar together from different worlds. When he meets Ayra, his desire for making himself loved, valued and counted awakens. What begins as a complicated, sometimes painful relationship, slowly turns into deep love. Despite being confident, when Ayra falls in love, she is in phase of self denial and slowly accepts her feelings. Given the differences and image of Kamyar in front of her family, she finds it hard to admit her feelings towards Kamyar. As their relationship grows deeper, Ayra discovers Kamyar's hidden secrets. As situations get twisted, their bond faces challenges as truth and deception collide, testing their future together. The drama highlights sacrifice, misunderstandings, family pressures, and second chances, showing how love can become someone’s entire world.

== Cast ==
=== Main ===
- Bilal Abbas Khan as Kamyar Sohail: Sohail and Nafeesa's son; Haji & Hakimzadi's grandson; Ayra's love interest later husband
- Hania Aamir as Dr. Ayra Irfan: Irfan and Beenish's daughter; Falak and Nadir's sister; Kamyar's love interest later wife

=== Recurring ===
- Alyy Khan as Dr. Irfan Ahmed: Beenish's husband; Falak, Ayra and Nadir's father, Kamyar’s father-in-law
- Javeria Abbasi as Beenish Irfan: Irfan's wife; Falak, Ayra and Nadir's mother, Kamyar’s mother-in-law
- Atabik Mohsin as Nadir Irfan: Irfan and Beenish's son; Falak and Ayra's brother
- Meher Jaffri as Dr. Falak Ishtiaq: Irfan and Beenish's eldest daughter; Ayra and Nadir's sister; Ishtiaq's wife
- Muhammad Fawad as Dr. Ishtiaq Ahmed: Mukhtar and Aimen's son; Falak’s husband; Kamyar's friend
- Akhtar Ghazali as Mukhtar: Aimen's husband; Ishtiaq's father
- Shazia Qaiser as Aimen Mukhtar: Ishtiaq's mother; Mukhtar's wife, Fatima's sister
- Fatima Gohar as Fatima: Aimen's sister; Khawar's mother; Ishtiaq's maternal aunt
- Ali Rehman Khan as Khawar: Fatima's son; Ayra's one-sided lover
- Areej Tariq as Naveen: Ayra's childhood best friend
- Shamim Hilaly as Hakimzadi Begum: Haji Sahab's widow; Sohail's mother; Kamyar's grandmother
- Adnan Jaffar as Sohail Ahmed: Nafeesa's husband; Kamyar's father; Haji Sahab and Hakimzadi's son
- Arjumand Rahim as Nafeesa Sohail: Sohail's wife; Kamyar's mother
- Shamoon Abbasi as Junaid: Fariya's father; Erum's ex-husband
- Vardah Aziz as Fariya Junaid: Junaid and Erum's daughter; Kamyar's childhood friend, ex-girlfriend and obsessive lover
- Angeline Malik as Erum Mansoor: Fariya's mother; Junaid's ex-wife; Mansoor's wife

=== Guest appearances ===
- Maria Gul Jan as Aliya: The girl dancing with Kamyar in the club (episode 1)
- Aneesha Altaf: The girl who went to lunch with Kamyar (episode 1)
- Hani Taha as Khadijah: suicide attempt survivor. The girl in the video with Kamyar (episodes 20, 21 and 22)
- Mohammed Ehteshamuddin as a patient in the hospital fighting cancer (episode 23)
- Marina Khan as Farah: Nafeesa's friend (episode 30)
- Musaddiq Malek as flight pilot (episode 34)
- Nadeem Baig as Kamyar's therapist (episode 34)

== Production ==
The series being called the most-anticipated dramas of 2025. It marked the first on-screen appearance of both Bilal Abbas and Hania together. The series sparked headlines before the release, a BTS picture confirmed the news shared by Hania on her "social media handle" with the caption revealing the title "Meri Zindagi Hai Tu". The first teaser of the series was released on 25 October 2025.

== Soundtrack ==
Meri Zindagi Hai Tu

Soundtrack album by Asim Azhar
- Released: 18 October 2025
- Recorded: 2025
- Genre: Television soundtrack
- Length: 3:45
- Language: Urdu
- Label: ARY Digital
External media
Audio
- Full audio on YouTube
Video
- Music video on YouTube

The original soundtrack is sung and composed by the popular singer Asim Azhar in collaboration with the Sabri Sisters. Lyrics were written by Azhar himself along with Nadeem Baig, Kumail Abbas. It received more than 80+ million views both audio and video on YouTube. The OST made history by becoming the first Pakistani drama original soundtrack to top Spotify's national charts climbed to the No.1 spot on top songs pakistan list.

== Reception ==
The male-centric drama series received mixed-to-positive response from critics and audience and criticism on portraying alcohol consumption as ordinary and normalising stalking behaviour while praising the chemistry between the lead pair (Bilal Abbas Khan and Hania Aamir) along with the splendid direction and soundtrack. The later episodes were also criticized for showing toxicity, narcissist behaviour.
