= Iss Khamoshi Ka Matlab =

- Genre: Family drama Romantic drama
- Created by: Babar Javed
- Written by: Mazhar Moin
- Directed by: Mazhar Moin
- Starring: Aiman Khan; Ali Ansari; Asad Siddiqui; Waseem Abbas; Hina Dilpazeer
- Opening theme: "Iss Khamoshi Ka Matlab Veerani hai" By Bushra Bilal
- Country of origin: Pakistan
- Original language: Urdu
- No. of seasons: 01
- No. of episodes: 26

Production
- Producer: Babar Javed
- Camera setup: Multi-camera setup
- Running time: 40-45 minutes

Original release
- Network: Geo Tv
- Release: 13 April – 21 September 2016

Iss Khamoshi ka Matlab (Eng: The meaning of this silence) is a Pakistani family drama television series premiered on Geo TV on 13 April 2016. It is produced by Babar Javed under A&B Entertainment.

== Plot ==
Is Khamoshi Ka Matlab is a family drama based on communication problems among family members. The play draws attention to a situation in which everyone in the family has personal resentments towards other family members but they never discuss those with each other.

The mother-in-law (Samina Ahmed) has several complaints with her son, Habib, (Waseem Abbas) and his wife, Salma, (Atiqa Odho) without a good reason. She lives with her daughter, Samina, (Fazila Qazi) who also humiliates her sister-in-law for one or another reason. She only happens to make matters worse by provoking Ahmed by repeatedly reminding him of the grudges she withholds.

Encapsulated by this animosity, there is a blossoming love story between two cousins. Neither Salma’s daughter, Zainab (Aiman Khan), nor Samina’s son, Ali (Ali Ansari), has the courage to disclose their feelings to their parents in this tragic situation. Eventually, they learn that Zainab’s parents have already fixed her marriage with her maternal cousin, Noman (Asad Siddiqui). Over time, their family's grudges get more severe while the two love birds are left to bear severe pain that comes with the family clash. The play explores this complicated dynamic as well as the lovers' plans to prevail in this situation.

== Cast ==
- Atiqa Odho as Salma
- Waseem Abbas as Habib: Salma's husband and Zainab's father
- Samina Ahmed as Habib's mother and Salma's mother-in-law
- Aiman Khan as Zainab: Salma and Habib's daughter
- Ali Ansari as Ali
- Asad Siddiqui as Noman
- Jinaan Hussain as Saima
- Fazila Qazi as Salina: Habib's sister
- Hina Dilpazeer
- Hina Rizvi as Yasmeen
- Saba Faisal
- Yasra Rizvi
- Shamim Hilaly as Yasmeen's aunt
- Sami Sani
- Azfar Ali

== See also ==
- List of programs broadcast by Geo TV
- Geo TV
- List of Pakistani television serials
