= Mehar Bano =

Pakistani actress (born 1994)

- Born: Mehar Bano; 13 April 1994 (age 32); Lahore, Punjab, Pakistan
- Education: National College of Arts
- Occupation: Actress
- Years active: 2011–present

Mehar Bano (Urdu: مہر بانو) is a Pakistani actress. She has played the role of Umama in the social drama Daagh for which she received a nomination for Best Actress at Lux Style Awards. She also played the roles of Batool in Balaa (2018) and Anoushay in Meray Paas Tum Ho (2019).

== Career ==
She started her career while studying at National College of Arts, Lahore. Bano is known for her work in television dramas. She has played the lead role of Umama in ARY Digital's Daagh (2012) for which she was nominated for Best Television Actress at the 13th Lux Style Awards. She further appeared in a leading role in Miss Fire (2013), Uff Yeh Mohabbat (2014) and Bunty I love You (2014).

Her other appearances include Mor Mahal, Lashkara, and Balaa. In 2018, she made her film debut with Motorcycle Girl.

== Controversy ==
Mehar Bano courted controversy in 2021 when she stated that she had joined the Aurat March to support homosexual rights in Pakistan. This caused an online backlash and a mass-scale reporting, which caused her Instagram account to be deleted.

== Filmography ==
=== Television ===
Year	Title	Role	Network	Notes
2012	Daagh	Umama		Nominated–Lux Style Awards for Best Television Actress
2013	Miss Fire	Mona		
2014	Uff Yeh Mohabbat	Dilkash		
2014	Bunty I Love You	Beenish		
2016	Mor Mohal	Mehar		
2018	Lashkara	Nikki		
2018	Balaa	Batool; Taimoor's sister		
2019	Mere Paas Tum Ho	Anushay; Mehwish's friend		
2019	Darling	Shabbo		Won award at Venice Film Fest
2020	Ghalati	Shanzay		
2021	Khuda Aur Muhabbat 3	Rida		
2022	Meray Humnasheen	Sanobar		
2023	Fatima Feng	Natasha		
2025	Dastakhat	Aiman	Hum TV	
2025	Mohalla	Shamsa	Express Entertainment	

=== Web Series/Films ===
Year	Title	Role	Notes
2018	Motorcycle Girl		Debut film
2020	Churails	Zubaida	Zee5 web series
2021	Midsummer Chaos		YouTube web series
2021	Qatil Haseenaon Ke Naam	Anarkali	Film
2024	Taxali Gate	Zainab	Film
