= Azekah Daniel =

Pakistani actress

- عزیقہ ڈینیل
- Education: St. Michael's Convent School Karachi
- Occupations: Actress, model, air hostess
- Years active: 2014 – present
- Known for: Malaal-e-Yaar, Cheekh, Balaa, Mein

Azekah Daniel (born 10 July 1992) is a Pakistani actress. She has appeared on several magazine covers. Daniel played the titular role of Noor Jahan in Noor Jehan (2015), Hooriya in Malaal-e-Yaar (2018), Sara in Tera Ghum Aur Hum (2020), and Aira in Mein (2023). She is further known for her roles in Aao Laut Chalein (2016), Balaa (2018), and Cheekh (2019).

== Personal life ==
Daniel was born in a Christian family in Karachi , where she continues to live.

She received significant viral press coverage for loudly exclaiming "Be humorous, not rude" during a live comedy show.

She joined the Pakistan Tehreek-e-Insaf (PTI) political party on 7 May 2023.

== Filmography ==
=== Film ===
| Year | Title | Role | Notes |
|---|---|---|---|
| 2018 | Pari | Mehwish | |

=== Television ===
| Year | Title | Role | Notes | Ref. |
|---|---|---|---|---|
| 2014 | Chhoti | Pinky Usman | | |
| 2015 | Anaya Tumhari Hui | Mirha | | |
| 2015 | Mera Yahan Koi Nahi | | | |
| 2015–2016 | Sada Sukhi Raho | Zoya | | |
| 2015–2016 | Tere Mere Beech | Tania | | |
| 2016 | Noor Jehan | Noor Jehan | | |
| 2016 | Anabiya | Alishba | | |
| 2017 | Rishtay Kachay Dhagoon Se | | | |
| 2017 | Aao Laut Chalein | Manar | | |
| 2017 | Yeh Ishq Hai | | Episode: "Sirf Tum" | |
| 2018 | Dukh Kam Na Honge | Hiba | | |
| 2018–2019 | Balaa | Saba Taimoor | | |
| 2018–2019 | Ishq Bepannah | Rania | | |
| 2019 | Cheekh | Haya Shariq | | |
| 2019 | Ishq Zahe Naseeb | Zoya | | |
| 2019 | Malaal-e-Yaar | Hooriya Balaj Malik | | |
| 2020 | Tera Ghum Aur Hum | Sarah | | |
| 2020-2021 | Dunk | Minal Haider Nawaz | | |
| 2021 | Ishq Hai | Naina | | |
| 2022 | Hasrat | Emab | | |
| 2023 | Ziddi | Rida | | |
| 2023-2024 | Mein | Aira Zaid Shahwani | | |
| 2025 | Shikanja | Rani | | |
