= Jinaan Hussain =

Pakistani actress

- Born: Sundus Tariq; 26 June 1989 (age 36); Abbottabad, Pakistan
- Education: National College of Arts (Bachelor in Fine Arts)
- Occupations: Actress, Model, Singer, Painter
- Years active: 2013 – present
- Spouse: Shah Saddam Hussain Gillani
- Children: 1
- Relatives: Hassan Talal (brother); Abdul Hadi (brother); Yasra Rizvi (sister-in-law)
- Website: www.jenaanhussain.com

Jinaan Hussain (Urdu: جنان حسین) is a Pakistani actress, model, singer and painter. She made her acting debut with theatre and moved on to television. Her debut series on television was Aisay Jiya Jaley (2013) aired on Hum TV. She rose to fame with Bashar Momin (2014) and subsequently played the lead roles in several television series including Baba Jani, Rabba Mainu Maaf Kareen and Koji.

== Early life ==
Hussain was born in Abbottabad, Khyber Pakhtunkhwa, Pakistan. During her schooling, she obtained A+ in most of the standards and got first rank in various Naat and debate competitions. She studied Fine Arts and graduated from National College of Arts, Lahore. Painting was her major subject.

== Career ==
While studying, she started doing theatre and came to Karachi to do theatre plays. She joined the television industry in 2013 and played lead roles in a number of serials including Bashar Momin, Baba Jani and Mere Mohsin. She also did modeling for magazines, commercials and advertisements. She changed her name from Sundus Tariq to Jinaan Hussain due to health issues during her childhood.

== Filmography ==
=== Television ===
Year	Title	Role	Network	Ref(s)
2013	Kala Jado	Tara	ARY Digital	
2013	Aise Jalay Jiya	Noreen	Hum TV	
2013	Mann Ke Moti	Zara	Geo TV	
2013	Humnasheen	Alishba	Hum TV	
2014	Rangbaaz	Beena	Express Entertainment	
2014	Hum Tehray Gunahgaar	Neha	Hum TV	
2014	Bashar Momin	Tayyaba	Geo Entertainment	
2014	Shareek-e-Hayat	Amna	Hum Network	
2014	Parvarish	Sundas	ARY Digital	
2015	Mahi Ray	Hafsa	PTV	
2015	Kaanch Ki Guriya	Joya	Geo TV	
2015	Zara Si Bhool	Sonia	TV One	
2015	Gul-e-Rana	Maria	Hum TV	
2015	Yeh Mera Deewanapan Hai	Zeba	A-Plus	
2016	Iss Khamoshi Ka Matlab	Saima	Geo TV	
2016	Saheliyaan	Nadia	ARY Digital	
2016	Besharam	Humna	ARY Digital	
2016	Iftar Mulaqat	Herself	Geo Kahani	
2016	Mera Ghar Aur Ghardari	Zara, Khalid's first wife	Geo TV	
2016	Faltu Larki	Faiza	A-Plus TV	
2016	Muqabil	Sara	ARY Digital	
2016	Socha Na Tha	Sawera	ARY Zindagi	
2016	Main Kaisy Kahun	Maria	Urdu 1	
2016	Mera Yaar Miladay	Isra	ARY Digital	
2017	Phir Wohi Mohabbat	Sana	Hum TV	
2017	Faisla	Nusrat	ARY Digital	
2017	Bubu ki Beti	Taaye	A-Plus	
2017	Dhund	Hira	TV One	
2017	Ghairat	Iqra	ARY Digital	
2017	Bedardi Saiyaan	Mariam	Geo Entertainment	
2017	Aik Thi Rania	Shehzadi	Geo Entertainment	
2018	Baba Jani	Naila	Geo Entertainment	
2018	Seep	Sumaiyya	TV One	
2018	Beti Jaisi	Maira	Geo Entertainment	
2019	Mazaaq Raat	Herself	Dunya News	
2019	Qismat Ka Likha	Zari	Express Entertainment	
2019	Meray Mohsin	Batool	Geo TV	
2019	Ishq Zahe Naseeb	Bushra	Hum TV	
2019	Dolly Darling	Bride	Geo TV	
2020	Rabba Mainu Maaf Kareen	Zenia	Hum TV	
2020	Raaz-e-Ulfat	Mohini	Geo Entertainment	
2020–21	Gustakh	Arisa	Express Entertainment	
2020–21	Prem Gali	Shireen (young)	ARY Digital	
2021	Neeli Zinda Hai	Nagina	ARY Digital	
2021	Makafaat Season 3	Wajiha	Geo Entertainment	
2021	Pardes	Sheema	ARY Digital	
2022	Socha Na Tha	Sara	Aur Life	
2022	Makafaat Season 4	Eshmaal	Geo Entertainment	
2022	Dikhawa Season 3	Pari	Geo Entertainment	
2022	Sirat-e-Mustaqeem Season 2	Hadia	ARY Digital	
2022	Saaya 2	Neelofar	Geo TV	
2022	Dil Awaiz	Gaiti	Geo Entertainment	
2022	Meri Guriya	Arfa	Aan TV	
2022	Pinjra	Rabia	ARY Digital	
2023	Ahsaas	Zainab	Express Entertainment	
2023	Ab Mer Bari	Umme	Aan TV	
2023	Mein Kahani Hun	Shaista	Express Entertainment	
2023	Hadsa	Fouzia Noor	Geo Entertainment	
2023	Nijaat	Nosheen	Hum TV	
2023	Dooriyan	Mahpara	Hum TV	
2023	Working Women	Rosie	Green Entertainment	
2024	Raaz	Sana	Green Entertainment	
2024	Chand Nagar	Mahi	BOL Entertainment	
2024	BOL Kahani	Sadaf	BOL Network	
2024	Diyar-e-Yaar	Rubina	Green Entertainment	
2025	Raaja Rani	Zoya	Hum TV	
2025	Behkaway	Sidra	Geo TV	
2026	Musafat	Rimsha	Hum TV	

=== Telefilm ===
Year	Title	Role
2018	Nayyer Aapa Ki Silai Machine	Maheen
2018	Koji	Koji
2018	Dino Ki Dulhaniya	Natasha
2024	Apna Ghar	Neha

=== Film ===
Year	Title	Role	Reference(s)
2020	Senti Aur Mental	Hadia	
2022	Tum Hum Woh	Patient	
2025	Adhurey Hum		
