= Dunk (TV series) =

Pakistani drama series

- Left-to-right: Sana Javed, Bilal Abbas Khan and Noman Ijaz
- Written by: Mohsin Ali
- Directed by: Badar Mehmood
- Starring: Bilal Abbas Khan; Sana Javed; Yasra Rizvi; Noman Ejaz
- Theme music composer: Background Score: SK Salman Khan; Deniss Tanveer; Sk Studio
- Composer: SK Salman Khan
- Country of origin: Pakistan
- Original language: Urdu
- No. of episodes: 32

Production
- Producers: Dr. Ali Kazmi; Fahad Mustafa
- Camera setup: Multi-camera setup
- Production company: Big Bang Entertainment

Original release
- Network: ARY Digital
- Release: 23 December 2020 – 7 August 2021

Dunk (Urdu: ڈنک, lit. 'Sting') is a Pakistani drama serial that premiered on 23 December 2020 on ARY Digital. The story revolves around a case of false allegation of sexual harassment and stars Bilal Abbas Khan as Haider, Sana Javed as Amal, Yasra Rizvi as Saira and Noman Ijaz as Professor Humayun. The serial has been written by Mohsin Ali and directed by Badar Mehmood, the duo who previously collaborated for mega-hits, Aisi Hai Tanhai and Ishqiya. According to producer Fahad Mustafa, the series is based on a real incident in Lahore. The story is inspired by an incident that took place at MAO College, Lahore, where a professor committed suicide over false harassment allegations by a student.

The series has received mixed reviews from critics who called the story drag and annoying and also criticised the director for using very loud sound sequences. Most praise the performances of Yasra Rizvi and Bilal Abbas Khan.

The drama achieved highest TRP of 7.8.

== Plot ==
The story revolves around a university where a student, Amal Faraz, accuses her teacher, Professor Humayun, of harassing her, and everyone supports her to fight back, including her fiancée Haider Nawaz. After a while, it is revealed that Amal made a false accusation against her teacher to save her fiance Haider who had accidentally sent some inappropriate photos and videos to a female teacher, Professor Anjum. Amal asks Professor Humayun to overlook and forgive what Haider did. When he declines, she locks the door and harasses him and tells him she will ruin his life by accusing him of harassment and she scatters things in the room and leaves.

Professor Humayun and Amal have one last conversation before the innocent professor walks out of the inquiry committee and leaves the university. Having no proof of his innocence, he commits suicide. The news disheartens Haider as it is revealed that he heard the last conversation between Professor Humayun and Amal and he found out Amal's truth. On Haider and Amal's wedding evening, Haider decides not to marry Amal because of her false accusations against Professor Humayun. He is kicked out of his house by his father Nawaz.

Amal marries Safeer Nawaz, Haider's elder brother on one condition that is to bring Haider back to the house. After a while, Haider marries Minal, Amal's friend, and gets kicked out of the house again after Amal accuses him of raping her. Haider then tells Minal the truth about Professor Humayun. Safeer also finds out the truth and divorces Amal in court.

Haider takes Amal to an abandoned place and keeps her there in isolation until morning to collect some proofs, when Haider shows Amal's father Faraz a video of Amal confessing the truth to Haider which was recorded by Sultan, Haider's friend. Heartbroken after learning the truth about his daughter's actions, Faraz commits suicide and his wife goes to court and slaps Amal in front of everyone.

Amal then confesses to her crimes and is sentenced to ten years in prison, 5 years for falsely accusing Professor Humayun and another five for false accusations against Haider. She goes to jail after Faraz's funeral. Haider, Nawaz, Safeer, Nawaz's wife Saba, and Minal reconcile. The show ends with Saira, Professor Humayun's wife, putting flowers on his grave.

== Cast ==
- Bilal Abbas Khan as Haider Nawaz, son of Nawaz & Saba ,Amal’s ex fiancé, Minal's husband
- Sana Javed as Amal Faraz, Haider’s ex-fiancée, Safeer's ex-wife
- Azekah Daniel as Minal Haider Nawaz, Amal & Haider”s college friend, Haider's wife
- Yasra Rizvi as Saira, Ghana’s mother, Humayun's wife
- Nauman Ijaz as Professor Humayun (Dead)
- Laila Wasti as Saba Nawaz, Haider and Safeer's mother
- Saife Hassan as Faraz, Amal’s father (Dead)
- Fahad Shaikh as Safeer Nawaz, son of Nawaz, Haider’s older brother, Amal’s ex-husband
- Salma Hassan as Mahnoor Faraz, Amal’s mother
- Kanwal Khan as Maha Faraz , Amal’s younger sister
- Gul-e-Rana as Aapa Bi
- Zarmeena Ikram as Ayesha
- Shahood Alvi as Nawaz, Haider and Safeer's father
- Annie Zaidi as Ms. VC (Vice-Chancellor)
- Tara Mahmood as Professor Anjum
- Khalid Zafar as Professor
- Fahima Awan as Saman, (Minal's sister-in-law)
- Rashid Farooqui as Amal's lawyer
- Usman Bashir as Judge

== Reception ==
Zeinab Masud of The Friday Times praised the direction, production values, Sana Javed's and Bilal Abbas's acting performances but criticised the story's gist for portraying a false accusation of assault, potentially undermining the #MeToo movement, and further found the entire premise of the series disturbing.

== Awards and nominations ==
=== Lux Style Awards ===
Ceremony	Categories	Recipients	Result
21st Lux Style Awards	Best TV Actor-Viewers' Choice	Bilal Abbas Khan	Nominated
21st Lux Style Awards	Best TV Actor-Critics' Choice	Bilal Abbas Khan	Nominated

== See also ==
- List of programs broadcast by ARY Digital
