= Alizeh Shah =

Pakistani actress (born 9 June 2002)

- علیزہ شاہ
- Born: June 9, 2002 (age 24); Karachi, Sindh, Pakistan
- Occupation: Actress
- Years active: 2016–Present
- Known for: Ehd-e-Wafa
- Awards: Hum Awards

Alizeh Shah (Urdu: علیزہ شاہ; born 9 June 2002) is a Pakistani actress who appears in Urdu television. She made her acting debut in 2016, with a supporting role Alina in Choti Si Zindagi. In 2018, Her performance as Palwasha in Ishq Tamasha earned her the Hum Award for Best Television Sensation. Shah got widely recognized after portraying the role of Dua in Ehd-e-Wafa (2019).

After that she has portrayed the main roles in several serials Hoor Pari (2019), Jo Tu Chahey (2019), Mera Dil Mera Dushman (2020), Tanaa Banaa (2021) and Bebasi (2022).

== Life and career ==
Alizeh Shah was born on 9 June 2002 in Karachi, Pakistan. In multiple interviews, Shah has stated that she was 17 years old during her role in Ehd-e-Wafa. She has also stated that she was 23 years old in May 2025. Shah has since played the female lead in Hoor Pari and Jo Tu Chahey. Shah played the character of Tamanna in the TV series Daldal and the role of Palwasha in drama serial Ishq Tamasha, for which she received a nomination for the Best Television Sensation Female award at the seventh Hum Awards. She had performed the role of Dua in the drama serial Ehd-e-Wafa. She portrayed Zara in ARY Digital's telefilm Dadi Ki Shadi (2026) and Zeenia in the Hum TV drama Naraz Hai Zindagi (2026).

=== Criticism ===
In May 2021, Alizeh ventured into singing with a Punjabi song titled Badnamiyan, alongside singer Sahir Ali Bagga. She faced backlash on social media for wearing a tank top in the music video. In July 2021, she again faced criticism for wearing revealing attire at the Hum Style Awards.

== Filmography ==
=== Film ===
Year	Title	Role	Notes	Ref
2019	Superstar	Chutki	(Film debut)	

=== Telefilms ===
Year	Title	Role	Network	Ref(s)
2022	Chand Raat Aur Chandni	Chandni	ARY Digital	
2023	Yeh Tou 2 Much Hogaya	Meena & Meenu	Geo Entertainment	
2024	Love Impossible	Annie	Express Entertainment	
2024	Wo 7 Din	Mahira	Hum TV	
2025	Bubbly Jasoos	Bubbly	Express Entertainment	
2025	V-Logger Da Viyah	Maha	Hum TV	
2026	Dadi Ki Shadi	Zara	ARY Digital	

=== Television ===
Year	Title	Role	Network	Notes	Ref(s)
2016	Choti Si Zindagi	Alina	HUM TV	TV debut	
2017	Daldal	Tamanna	HUM TV	Support role	
2017	Tere Naal Luv Hogaya	—N/a	Play Entertainment	Support role	
2018	Ishq Tamasha	Palwasha	Hum TV	Support role	
2018	Dil Mom Ka Diya	Farhat	ARY Digital	Support role	
2018	Baandi	Bakto	HUM TV	Support role	
2018	Bisaat e Dil	Shafaq	HUM TV	Support role	
2018	Tum Mujrim Ho	Maheen	BOL Entertainment	Support role	
2018	Hoor Pari	Gulnaz	Aplus TV	Main role	
2019	Jo Tu Chahey	Mashal	Hum TV	Main role	
2019	Ehd-e-Wafa	Dua Saad	Hum TV	Main role	
2020	Mera Dil Mera Dushman	Mairah	ARY Digital	Main role	
2020	Dikhawa (S1.E23) - Faraib	Misbah	Harpal Geo TV	Main role	
2021	Tanaa Banaa	Zoya	Hum TV	Main role	
2021	Bebasi	Ifrah	Hum TV	Main role	
2022	Taqdeer	Romaisa	ARY Digital	Main role	
2023	Kitni Girhain Baaki Hain (S3.E9) - Jabar	Bakhtawar	Hum TV	Main role	
2023	Kitni Girhain Baaki Hain (S3.E13) - Husn e Ittefaq	Komal	Hum TV	Main role	
2023	Khel	Alishba	Hum TV	Main role	
2023	Muhabbat Ki Akhri Kahani	Shireen	Express Entertainment	Main role	
2024	Kitni Girhain Baaki Hain (S3.E27) - Farz	Kiran	Hum TV	Main role	
2024	2 No Platform	Maria	TVOne	Main role	
2024	Ishq Beparwah	Jannat	Green Entertainment	Main role	
2026	Khwaab Meray	Tania	Green Entertainment	Main role	
2026	Naraz Hai Zindagi	Zeenia	Hum TV	Main role	

=== Web series ===
Year	Title	Role	Network	Notes	Ref(s)
2021	Dulhan Aur Aik Raat	Meesha (Dulhan)	Urduflix	First web series on Pakistan's first-ever OTT platform	

=== Music videos ===
Year	Title	Singer(s)	Notes	Ref(s)
2021	Yaadan	Falak Shabir	Starring	
2022	Raabte	Ali Tariq	Starring	
2025	Laykin	Ali Raza, Shajjar Hussain	Starring	

=== Discography ===
Year	Song	Role	Co-singer(s)	Composer(s)	Notes	Ref(s)
2021	Badnamiyan	Singer	Sahir Ali Bagga	Sahir Ali Bagga	Debut single	

=== Special appearance ===
Year	Title	Role	Notes
2019	Sara Sajeeda	Jasmin	Cameo

== Awards and nominations ==
Year	Award	Category	Work	Result	Ref
2019	ARY Digital- Social Media Drama Awards	Best Newcomer (Female)	Dil Mom Ka Diya	Nominated	
2019	7th Hum Awards	Best Television Sensation Female	Ishq Tamasha	Won	
2020	PISA Awards	Best Supporting Actress (Film)	Superstar	Nominated	
2021	4th IPPA Awards	Best Actor Female - TV Serial	Ehd-e-Wafa	Nominated	
2021	4th IPPA Awards	Best On-Screen Couple with Ahad Raza Mir	Ehd-e-Wafa	Nominated	
2021	ARY People's Choice Awards	Favourite Actress	Mera Dil Mera Dushman	Nominated	
2021	ARY People's Choice Awards	Favourite Actress in a Role of Wife	Mera Dil Mera Dushman	Nominated	
2021	ARY People's Choice Awards	Favourite Jodi with Noaman Sami	Mera Dil Mera Dushman	Nominated	
