= Rahma Ali =

Pakistani actress and singer (born 1988)

- Born: 15 September 1988 (age 38); Lahore, Punjab, Pakistan
- Education: Beaconhouse National University
- Occupations: Actress; Singer
- Years active: 2011–present
- Parents: Abid Ali (father); Humaira Ali (mother)
- Relatives: Iman Ali (sister)

Rahma Ali is a Pakistani actress and singer. She is known for her roles in dramas Nail Polish, Choti, Chupke Se Bahaar Aajaye, Mol and Rukhsati.

== Early life ==
Rahma was born on 15 September 1988 in Lahore, Pakistan. She completed her studies from Beaconhouse National University.

== Career ==
Rahma made her debut as an actress in 2011. She was noted for her roles in the dramas Chupke Se Bahar Ajaye, Mere Apnay and Ghar Aik Jannat. She also appeared in drama Rukhsati, Nail Polish and Choti. Since then she has appeared in the drama Mol. In 2014 she joined Coke Studio and sang songs in dramas and movies. She also sang songs in the drama Ranjha Ranjha Kardi and the movie Moor. In 2014, she appeared in movie Gidh.

== Filmography ==
=== Television ===
Year	Title	Role	Network
2011	Nail Polish	Sonia	A-Plus TV
2013	Madventures	Herself	ARY Digital
2013	Ghundi	Zoya	Hum Sitaray
2014	Nazdeekiyan	Rubasha	ARY Digital
2014	Chupke Se Bahar Ajaye	Shafaq	A-Plus TV
2014	Rukhsati	Rida	Geo Entertainment
2014	Mere Apnay	Laiba	ARY Digital
2014	Choti	Rohina	Geo TV
2014	Coke Studio Season 7	Herself	Coke Studio
2015	Ghar Aik Jannat	Sharmeen	Geo TV
2015	Raja Indar	Hina	ARY Zindagi
2015	Mazaaq Raat	Herself	Dunya News
2015	Mol	Sonia	Hum TV

=== Telefilm ===
Year	Title	Role
2021	Shikast	Maya

=== Film ===
Year	Title	Role
2014	Gidh	Sidra

== Discography ==
=== Coke Studio songs ===
Year	Song	Notes
2014	Nadiya	Performed with Jimmy Khan
2014	Gaari Ko Chalana Babu	Originally sung by Zubaida Khanum

=== TV series ===
Year	Song	Serial	Credits
2018	Lamhay	Lamhay	Composed by Sami Khan
2018	Ranjha Ranjha Kardi	Ranjha Ranjha Kardi	Composed by Sami Khan
2024	Khudsar	Khudsar	Composed by Adrian David Emmanuel
2024	Shehzadi House	Shehzadi House	Composed by Joshua Augustine
2025	Na Tum Jano Na Hum	Na Tum Jaano Na Hum	Composed by Adrian David
2025	Hum Tanha Hi Rehtay	Neeli Kothi	Composed by Sami Khan

=== Lollywood ===
Year	Song	Film	Composer
2015	Jeye Jeye Ja	Moor	Strings
2019	Dekho Dekho	Ready Steady No	Hisham Bin Munawar
2023	Mann Ranjhan	Babylicious	Adrian David

== Awards and nominations ==
Year	Award	Category	Result	Tile	Ref.
2020	19th Lux Style Awards	Best Original Soundtrack	Won	Ranjha Ranjha Kardi	
