= Working Women (TV series) =

- Written by: Bee Gul
- Directed by: Yasra Rizvi
- Starring: Maria Wasti; Anoushay Abbasi; Srha Asghar; Jinaan Hussain; Faiza Gillani
- Country of origin: Pakistan
- Original language: Urdu
- No. of episodes: 16

Production
- Producers: Qaiser Ali; Kashif Nisar
- Production companies: Multiverse Entertainment; Q&K Productions

Original release
- Network: Green Entertainment
- Release: 20 September – 21 December 2023

Working Women is a Pakistani television series directed by Yasra Rizvi and written by Bee Gul. It is co-produced by Kashif Nisar and first aired on Green Entertainment on 20 September 2023. The series revolves around six working women who try to balance their professional and personal lives in a male-dominated society.

== Plot ==
Nusrat, a successful real estate agent, converts her home into a girls' hostel, providing shelter to a diverse group of women. These include Aasha, a young mute runaway; Amber, a journalist fleeing her stepfather's home due to her relationship with her boyfriend; Sadia, an aspiring model from Gujranwala; Rossie, a nurse; and Hashmat, a factory supervisor from the tribal areas.

Aasha becomes involved with the hostel's kitchen helper, TT, but they are discovered by people from Aasha's village who were searching for her. Aasha escapes, but TT remains silent, protecting her, and is brutally injured by the feudal lord's goons as a result. He starts disliking her when he learns she is a Hindu, as the feudal lord wanted to change her religion to marry her off. Nusrat respects Aasha's perspective and tries to protect her. TT asks Aasha to change her religion, but she refuses. Shafi, the feudal lord's educated son, intervenes and resolves the dispute, enabling Aasha to decide for herself what religion she wants to follow. Over time, TT persistently pressures Aasha to convert to her religion, but eventually, he abandons his efforts and leaves the hostel, supposedly to travel to Dubai.

Sadia struggles to succeed in Lahore's modeling and acting scene and eventually becomes a social media star. She declines her producer's proposal to focus on her career and financial goals. When TikTok is banned, she faces a decline in her popularity. The producer makes Sadia another proposal, which she initially accepts. However, she soon uncovers his true intentions: exploiting her to create explicit videos for a lucrative market. When she confronts him, a heated argument ensues, during which Sadia threatens to expose him at a press conference. In a shocking turn of events, he attempts to silence her by shooting at her on the road.

Amber finds a job at a newspaper office but is blackmailed by her ex-boyfriend, who has her videos. With the support of her editor, she controls her guilt and anger, and herself leaks the videos on social media. Nusrat protects her from bullying and harassment, and her editor fires the workers who bullied her. Amber's mother suggests leaving the country, but she refuses and decides to face the situation head-on. When her editor is injured by the fired worker she eventually decides to leave the country.

Rossie is exploited by her boyfriend Kashi, who lives abroad, as he manipulates her into enduring harassment from senior doctors to extract benefits from them. He gaslights her into sending the money to him, taking advantage of her vulnerable situation. Rossie regularly faces such exploitation, as doctors summon nurses to their offices and coerce them into staying with them during night duties. After succumbing to the harassment and approving a loan, Rossie sends the money to Kashi, only to be betrayed when he marries a foreigner. Heartbroken and determined, Rossie decides to take a stand, refusing to compromise her integrity further. She starts performing her job honestly and now declines to enter the doctors' rooms when called, breaking free from the cycle of exploitation.

Hashmat faces workplace harassment by her factory manager, but she takes a stand and complains to the owners. The manager is fired, and the owner apologizes, offering her the job again without her knowledge. She frequently meets a man, Masood, secretly and suggests him as the hostel's guard. At her new factory, a teenager starts liking her, but she insults him, leading to his attempted suicide. She realizes her mistake of judging everyone harshly. It is then revealed that Masood's wife and Hasmat's sister Neelam was killed in honour killing prompting them to come here to save their lives and for the better future of Masood and Neelam's kid. When their enemies show up, Masood departs from the hostel, telling Hashmat not to expect his return.

Nusrat's friend Zulfi, a lawyer, occasionally assists her but also taunts her for her independence. Their past relationship ended when Zulfi got married. Later, Shafi develops feelings for Nusrat and proposes, but she rejects him outright. Shortly after, Nusrat receives court notices to vacate the hostel, which is built on Nusrat's brother's land, and to face charges for Aasha's illegal imprisonment - all orchestrated by Shafi. Zulfi warns Nusrat about Shafi's true intentions, but she refuses to back down. When the court orders the building's eviction, Zulfi discloses that being a lawyer of Nusrat's mother he had transferred the house to Nusrat's brother, as per her mother's dying wish. This bombshell shatters Nusrat's trust, leaving her reeling. Heartbroken, Nusrat then leaves the hostel with Hashmat, Rossie, and Aasha.

== Cast ==
- Maria Wasti as Nusrat aka Lucy
- Anoushay Abbasi as Sadia
- Srha Asghar as Amber
- Jinaan Hussain as Rossie
- Faiza Gillani as Hashmat
- Ilsa Hareem as Aasha
- Adnan Jaffar as Zulfi
- Laila Wasti as Natasha Jahangir Elahi
- Fahima Awan as Erum
- Amna Malik as Huma
- Shariq Mehmood
- Farhad Ali as Saim Hamdani
- Mehroz Gull as TT

== Production ==
After working in Kashif Nisar's Dil Na Umeed To Nahi, Nisar suggested Rizvi to work for upcoming network Green Entertainment. Rizvi was approached to direct the series Working Women which was written by Bee Gul. Before Rizvi, Nisar was approached to direct the series, however he couldn't direct it due to its bold narrative. Rizvi announced the project in April 2021 on her Instagram handle.

The principal photography took place from April to September 2021.

The series premiered on 20 September 2023 on Green Entertainment.

== Reception ==
=== Critical reception ===
Feminism in India remarked that Working Women "establishes a new benchmark for poignant and significant storytelling". While mentioning it along with some other television productions, The News International opined that the success of these series is "ample proof that the modern-day viewers’ tastes have matured." Another commentator found that "Each woman represents a facet of the challenges faced by women in their pursuit of personal and professional fulfilment."
