= Zulqarnain Haider (actor) =

Pakistani actor

- ذوالقرنین حیدر
- Born: 1959 (age 66–67); Rawalpindi, Punjab, Pakistan
- Occupations: Actor; Comedian; Director; Producer; Writer; Stage performer
- Years active: 1973–present
- Known for: Television comedy and stage theatre
- Awards: Pride of Performance (2026)

Zulqarnain Haider (Urdu: ذوالقرنین حیدر) is a Pakistani actor, comedian, writer, and stage performer known for his work in theatre and television. He began his career as a stage actor and later appeared in numerous television drama serials and comedy productions. In addition to acting, he has worked as a writer and director, particularly in stage theatre, and has spoken publicly about the development of comedy and performing arts in Pakistan.

== Early life and education ==
Zulqarnain Haider was born in Rawalpindi, Punjab, with his ancestral family roots in Attock, and grew up in Karachi, where he completed all his education, including his graduation from the University of Karachi.

== Career ==
Zulqarnain Haider began his professional career at a young age in theatre in 1973, where he worked extensively as a stage performer (collaborating with the likes of Moin Akhter and Umer Sharif) before transitioning to television. He developed his craft primarily through stage work and later gained wider recognition through television drama and comedy roles.

In interviews, Haider has stated that theatre played a central role in shaping his acting style and comic timing, describing stage performance as his primary training ground before appearing regularly on television. Alongside acting, he has also written and directed stage plays and television material, contributing to productions both on and off screen.

Haider has expressed concern in interviews about changes in Pakistan’s theatre and comedy culture. He has criticised what he described as increasing vulgarity in stage performances, arguing that it has reduced opportunities for performers trained in traditional theatre and affected the quality of comedic acting. He has also stated that comedy is often undervalued as a genre, despite requiring discipline, timing, and technical skill.

In recent years, Haider has reflected on the challenges faced by senior performers, including typecasting in comic roles and limited opportunities for theatre-trained actors in contemporary television.

== Selected filmography ==
=== Television series ===
| Year | Title | Role | Writer | Director | Producer | Network | Notes |
|---|---|---|---|---|---|---|---|
| 1984 | Koshish | Kamal | Yes | | | PTV | Sitcom |
| 1985 | Khawaja and Son | Manzar | | | | PTV | |
| 1986 | Chhaon | Wilayat | | | | PTV | |
| 1989 | Jangloos | Meharban Ali | | | | PTV | |
| 1991 | Subah Kay Bhoolay | Munshi Shoka | | | | PTV | Anthology: Guest House |
| 1994 | Paigham Zubani Aur Hai | Naseer-ud-deen | | | | PTV | Anthology: Hairat Kadah |
| 1995 | Uraan | Abdul Baqi (Chhalawa) | | | | PTV | Based on PIA |
| 1995 | Mandi | Mirchi (Rasheed) | | | | PTV | |
| 1999 | Haqeeqat | Aamir | Yes | Yes | Yes | PTV | Horror serial |
| 2004 | Khamosh | Doctor Zain | Yes | Yes | | PTV | Horror serial |
| 2004 | Aag | Hashaam (Bhola) | Yes | Yes | | PTV | |
| 2011 | Afsar Be Kaar-e-Khas | Amanat | | | | PTV | Sitcom |
| 2011 | Bhaati Chowk | Khaleel Khan | | | | A-Plus TV | Sitcom |
| 2015 | Unsuni | Hassan Mustafa | | | | PTV | |
| 2023 | Akhri Scene | Jail officer | | | | PTV | Anthology: Kahani Ghar |

=== Telefilms ===
| Year | Title | Role | Network |
|---|---|---|---|
| 2019 | Help Me Durdana | Feeqa | ARY Digital |

== Awards and recognition ==
| Year | Award | Category | Project | Result | Ref. |
|---|---|---|---|---|---|
| 1985 | Nigar Award | Best TV Actor | Koshish | Yes | |

Haider has received multiple awards, including Nigar Awards, Graduate Awards, Radio Drama Awards, and Pakistan Television Awards, as well as a Gold Medal from Abbottabad and a Lifetime Achievement honour from Peshawar. In 2026, he received the Pride of Performance award from the President of Pakistan.
