= Rukhsati (TV series) =

Pakistani television series

- Genre: Family drama
- Written by: Amna Mufti
- Directed by: Mohsin Mirza
- Starring: Sunita Marshall; Abid Ali; Faizan Khawaja; Rahma Ali; Anum Fayyaz; Mehmood Akhtar; Gul-e-Rana; Sana Askari; Asad Siddiqui; Rizwan Ali Jaffri
- Country of origin: Pakistan
- Original language: Urdu
- No. of episodes: 21

Production
- Production location: Pakistan
- Running time: Approx 40 Minutes
- Production company: A&B Entertainment

Original release
- Network: Geo Entertainment
- Release: 12 March – 19 November 2014

Rukhsati (Urdu: رخصتی) was a 2014 Pakistani drama serial directed by Mohsin Mirza, produced by A&B Entertainment, and written by Amna Mufti. The drama was first aired on 12 March 2014 on Geo Entertainment, where it aired every Wednesday at 8:00 P.M. The story revolves around a young woman, Maleeha, whose life goals are destroyed after her marriage to an older man.

The series' title "Rukhsati" refers to the formal "sending off" of a bride to her husband's home following a Pakistani Muslim wedding.

== Cast ==
- Sunita Marshall as Maleeha
- Abid Ali as Maleeha's husband
- Faizan Khawaja
- Mehmood Akhtar
- Gul-e-Rana
- Seema Sehar
- Sana Askari
- Anum Fayyaz as Masooma
- Tahira Imam
- Bilal Qureshi
- Asad Siddiqui
- Rahma Ali as Rida
- Rizwan Ali Jaffri
