= Ayesha (TV series) =

Pakistani web television series

- Written by: Mehwish Hassan
- Directed by: Najaf Bilgrami
- Presented by: GlaxoSmithKline Pakistan
- Starring: Yasra Rizvi; Sarmad Khoosat; Shees Sajjad Gul
- Country of origin: Pakistan
- Original language: Urdu
- No. of episodes: 6

Production
- Camera setup: Multi-camera setup
- Production company: Seeme Productions

Original release
- Network: YouTube; Broadcast syndication
- Release: 8 February – 14 March 2020

Ayesha is a 2020 Pakistani drama web television series, presented by GlaxoSmithKline and directed by Najaf Bilgrami. First episode of the series aired online on 8 February 2020. It features Yasra Rizvi, Sarmad Khoosat, Shees Sajjad and Maham Amir.

It is the story of Ayesha, a middle aged housewife who dedicated her life for her family but she doesn't get valued and attention which she deserves from her family.

== Plot ==
Ayesha is the story of a married homemaker in an urban set-up who lives with her one child and a husband. Her life revolves around her husband who is an egoist and practical and one grown child. To the world, her family seems nothing short of a dream. However, Ayesha soon starts to realize that her very own husband takes her for granted and that her world is shallow and lonely. And amidst the quest of caring for his every need, she never took the time to carve her own identity and harness her talent for being a YouTuber. She soon embarks on a journey to create an identity for herself - which has more layers than that of a wife and mother – one of that of an individual.

== Cast ==
- Yasra Rizvi as Ayesha Ahmed
- Sarmad Khoosat as Fahad Ahmed
- Shees Sajjad as Ali Ahmed; Ayesha and Fahad's son
- Maham Amir as Sasha; Ayesha's friend
- Zubair Akram as Fahad's colleague
- Sana Gilani as Beautician
