= Noaman Sami =

Pakistani television actor (born 1990)

- Born: 3 May 1990 (age 36); Peshawar, Khyber Pakhtunkhwa, Pakistan
- Occupation: Actor
- Years active: 2017–2020

Noaman Sami (born 3 May 1990) is a Pakistani actor who works in Urdu television. His works include Main Haar Nahi Manoun Gi, Daldal, Help Me Durdana. In 2019, he made his film debut with Talash which was critically praised. In 2020, He was seen playing a leading role of Shahmeer in Mera Dil Mera Dushman.

== Personal life ==
He along with other cast of Mera Dil Mera Dushman was allegedly tested positive for COVID-19 during the COVID-19 pandemic on 20 May 2020 and after the period of one month continue shoot for the series.

== Television ==
Year	Title	Role	Network	Notes
2017	Daldal	Fahad	Hum TV	Debut
2017–2018	Naseebon Jali	Yasir	Hum TV	
2018	Maa Sadqay	Noman	Hum TV	
2018	Main Haar Nahi Manoun Gi	Rohan	Hum TV	
2020	Tera Yahan Koi Nahi	Arsalan	Hum TV	
2020	Mera Dil Mera Dushman	Shahmeer	ARY Digital	

=== Special appearance ===
Year	Title	Role	Network	Notes
2019	Help Me Durdana	Dino's friend	ARY Digital	Telefilm
2020	Dikhawa	Recurring	Geo TV	Episode 23

=== Film ===
Year	Title	Role	Notes
2019	Talash	Ahmed	Lead role

== Awards and nominations ==
Year	Award	Category	Work	Result
2021	ARY People's Choice Awards	Favourite Actor in a role of Bhai	Mera Dil Mera Dushman	Nominated
2021	ARY People's Choice Awards	Favourite Drama Actor	Mera Dil Mera Dushman	Nominated
2021	ARY People's Choice Awards	Favourite Emerging Talent (Male)	Mera Dil Mera Dushman	Nominated
2021	ARY People's Choice Awards	Favourite Jodi with Alizeh Shah	Mera Dil Mera Dushman	Nominated
