= Yasra Rizvi =

Pakistani actress and writer

- Born: 15 November 1982 (age 43); Islamabad, Pakistan
- Occupations: Actress, director, poet, writer
- Years active: 2011–present
- Spouse: Abdul Hadi (m. 2016)
- Children: 1
- Relatives: Jenaan Hussain (sister-in-law)

Yasra Rizvi is a Pakistani actress, director, poet and writer. She became an internet sensation in 2019 due to her poetry. As an actress, Yasra played the female lead in a number of television productions, including Mann Ke Moti (2012), Woh Dobara (2014), Thora Sa Aasman (2016) and Ustani Jee (2018). She is known for her portrayal of women in challenging situations. She gained critical acclaim for her performance in the web-series Churails (2020). Her directorial ventures include Shanaas, Working Women (both 2023) and Chand Nagar.

== Personal life ==
Yasra married Abdul Hadi in Karachi in December 2016. The couple were blessed with a baby boy in 2021.

== Career ==
Rizvi started her acting career after completing her Master's from London, UK. She initially performed on stage and theatre plays and moved to television serials. She received critical acclaim for her portrayal of a single mother in Mann Ke Moti (2013) aired on Geo TV. The series was a critical and commercial hit, also broadcast in India on Zindagi TV. Later she appeared as Fariha in Malika-Aliya (2014) and as Yasmeen in Woh Dubara (2014). In 2016, she appeared in the women-centric serial Thoda Sa Aasman, portraying the role of Fatima.

In 2016 Rizvi started working on a comedy, Senti Aur Mental, featuring Zain Afzal, Rizvi herself and Yousuf Bashir Qureshi in the cast. The project, that would have been Rizvi's directorial debut, was cancelled in 2021.

Her other appearances include Iss Khamoshi Ka Matlab (2016), Kitni Girhain Baaki Hain 2 (2016), Baji Irshad (2017), Aangan (2017) and Ustani Jee (2018).

In 2020, she played the lead role of Jugnu Chaudhary alongside an ensemble cast in Asim Abbasi's directed Churails, and released on ZEE5. Her portrayal of an ubar rich wedding planner was praised by critics. A reviewer from The Express Tribune opined "her performance improves tremendously with each episode.", while The Khaleej Times found her "simply delightful, often bringing in humorous elements to scenes rife with tension."

The same year, she starred in Dunk as a wife seeking justice for her husband, a professor who had succumbed to suicide due to false allegations of harassment. In the following year 2021, she was portrayed an undereducated call girl in Kashif Nisar directed Dil Na Umeed To Nahi.

In 2023, she made her solo directorial debut Shanaas, a mystery-thriller broadcast on Green Entertainment. A reviewer from DAWN Images praised her direction for its balance, emotional depth, and ability to elicit strong performances from the cast. Her next project Working Women, a series about the challenges of working women of the society, which was written by Bee Gul also broadcast on the same network.

=== Poetry career ===
Yasra Rizvi is also known for her work as a poet, writing primarily in Urdu. Her poetry is recognized for its emotional depth, introspective tone, and strong narrative style. Often centered around themes of identity, resilience, and human relationships, her verses have resonated with a wide audience. Yasra’s poetic voice adds another dimension to her creative profile, complementing her work in acting and direction..She was also the lyricist for UK-based DJ and producer Bonobo's 2026 track "Fire on the Water", featuring Pakistani singer Arooj Aftab.

== Filmography ==
=== Film ===
Year	Title	Role	Notes
2015	Jawani Phir Nahi Ani	Sherry's mother	
2015	Manto	Balwant Kaur	

=== Television ===
Year	Title	Role	Notes
As an actress
2012–2013	Daagh	Rehana	
2013	Kaash Aisa Ho		
2013–2014	Mann Ke Moti	Fariha	
2014	Malika-e-Aliya	Khadija	
2014	Woh Dobara	Yasmeen	
2014	Bhabhi Sambhal Chabi		
2014–2015	Choti	Dr.Amna	
2015	Sawaab	Sadia	
2015	Baji Irshad	Irshad	
2015	Nazo	Habeel's sister	
2016	Main Kamli	Raaghi	
2016	Iss Khamoshi Ka Matlab		
2016	Thoda Sa Aasman	Fatima	
2016	Iftar Mulaqaat	Herself	
2016	Kitni Girhain Baaki Hain 2	Yasra	Episode 36
2016–2017	Faltu Larki	Tajwar	
2016–2017	Manchahi		
2017	Aangan	Haseena	Cameo
2018	Ustani Jee	Shehwar; Ustani Jee	writer also
2020-2021	Dunk	Sairah	
2021	Dil Na Umeed To Nahi	Sawera	
2022	Dil Awaiz	Tammana Khanum	
2023	Shanaas		
As a director
2015	Baji Irshad	Irshad	
2023	Shanaas		
2023	Working Women	—N/a	
2024	Chand Nagar	—N/a	

=== Webseries ===
Year	Title	Role	Notes
2020	Ayesha	Ayesha	Web series
2020	Churails	Jugnu	Web series on Zee5
