= Daagh (TV series) =

Pakistani TV series

- داغ
- Genre: Drama
- Written by: Sarwat Nazir
- Directed by: Sarmad Khoosat
- Starring: Fahad Mustafa; Mehar Bano; Talha Mufti; Sana Askari
- Theme music composer: Farrukh Abid; Shoaib Farrukh
- Opening theme: Yeh Tamam Zindagi Daagh Hai written by Sarwat Nazir performed by Alycia Dias
- Composer: Waqar Ali
- Country of origin: Pakistan
- Original language: Urdu
- No. of episodes: 23

Production
- Producer: A&B Entertainment
- Editor: Faisal Gulzar
- Running time: 35–40 minutes
- Production company: A&B Entertainment

Original release
- Network: ARY Digital
- Release: 14 October 2012 – 29 March 2013

Daagh (Urdu: داغ, lit. 'Stain') is a Pakistani television series directed by Sarmad Khoosat, addressing social issues. The series highlights the struggles of women who are unable to bear a male child. It was broadcast in India on Zindagi TV, premiering on 30 November 2015. The show concluded on 23 December 2015.

== Plot ==
The story of the Daagh drama serial completely revolves around the life of a housewife named Umama (Mehar Bano), who has four daughters. Umama belongs to a middle-class family who lives with her parents and two sisters. Her father has a very conservative personality. Umama marries Murad (Fahad Mustafa). Murad also belongs to a middle-class family and lives with his mother and two sisters. Initially, Murad's cousin Deeba (Sana Askari) was interested in him and wanted to get married. But he chooses Umama as his life partner. With the passage of time, Umama gave birth to four daughters, but her mother-in-law demands a baby boy (for the sake of family name). After the birth of his fourth daughter, Murrad's mother forces him to marry Deeba. After Murad's second marriage, Deeba wants Murad to divorce his first wife, Umama. Eventually, Deeba gives birth to twin sons and gains importance in Murad's eyes. Murad starts neglecting Umama and her daughters. Umama, after sustaining a lot of insults, leaves Murad's house. She is hired by a school and stays in her father's house. It is known afterwards that Murad's sons were having developmental abnormalities. Murad understands his mistakes. Deeba is regretful, too. Murad apologizes to Umama, but she refuses to go with him again and lives independently with her daughters.

== Cast ==
- Fahad Mustafa as Murad : Umama & Deeba's husband; Noreen & Rehana's brother; Fiza, Nimra, Hira & Soha's father.
- Mehar Bano as Umama Murad : Murad's first wife; Atiqa's sister; Fiza, Nimra, Hira, Soha, Waleed & Aabis's mother.
- Talha Mufti as Mushtaq : Umama's cousin and ex-fiancé
- Sana Askari as Deeba Murad : Murad's cousin turned second wife; Waleed & Aabis's mother.
- Uroosa Qureshi as Noreen : Murad & Rehana's sister.
- Firdous Jamal as Umama & Atiqa's father.
- Yasra Rizvi as Rehana Irfan :Soha's adoptive mother; Irfan's wife; Murad and Noreen's sister.
- Sidra Batool as Atiqa Qamar : Umama's sister.
- Sumbul Shahid as Noor
- Shama Askari as Aqeela : Murad, Rehana and Noreen's mother.
