= Help Me Durdana =

- Genre: Romantic comedy
- Written by: Saba Hasan
- Directed by: Aabis Raza
- Starring: Yasir Hussain; Ushna Shah; Mehmood Aslam
- Music by: SK Salman Khan
- Country of origin: Pakistan
- Original language: Urdu

Production
- Producers: Fahad Mustafa; Dr. Ali Kazmi
- Running time: 109 minutes
- Production company: Big Bang Entertainment

Original release
- Network: ARY Digital
- Release: 8 June 2019

Help Me Durdana is a 2019 Pakistani comedy television film aired on ARY Digital on 5 June 2019. It is co-produced by Fahad Mustafa and Dr. Ali Kazmi under their banner Big Bang Entertainment. It has Yasir Hussain, Ushna Shah and Mehmood Aslam in leads.

== Cast ==
- Yasir Hussain as Daniyal aka Dino/Durdana; Dino's mother (dual role)
- Ushna Shah as Maheen (Mahi)
- Mehmood Aslam as Chaudhry Sahab (Maheen's father)
- Noaman Sami as Dino's friend
- Zulqarnain Haider as Feeqa

== Controversy ==
A week before the release of telefilm, Hussain became a victim of trolls and news when he commented offensive words against LGBT community on his Instagram account. He posted a promo picture of telefilm where he was wearing a Sari as it was the requirement of his role in the project. The fan commented ‘Why don’t you guys hire an actual transgender?’, to which Hussain replied, ‘matlab apko job chahye’ (English: "Means, you want this role"). Many people criticized this act of Hussain and found it offensive. Reviewer from The Express Tribune called this a transphobic act to which Hussain said, "I have immense regard for transpersons". He further said that people misunderstood his role as he was playing the role of a mother not a transgender in the project.
