= Tanaa Banaa =

2021 Pakistani television series

- Title Card
- Urdu: تانا بانا
- Genre: Romance; Teen drama
- Created by: Shahzad Javed
- Written by: Hassaan Imam
- Screenplay by: Shahzad Javed
- Directed by: Saife Hassan
- Starring: Alizeh Shah; Danyal Zafar
- Theme music composer: Naveed Nashad
- Opening theme: Tanaa Banaa by Amanat Ali
- Ending theme: Tanaa Banaa by Amanat Ali
- Composer: Naveed Nashad
- Country of origin: Pakistan
- Original language: Urdu
- No. of seasons: 1
- No. of episodes: 30

Production
- Executive producer: Momina Duraid
- Production locations: Karachi, Pakistan
- Editors: Jameel Iqbal Awaan; Saad Bin Javed
- Camera setup: Multi-camera setup
- Running time: 18-24 minutes (Last episode: 53 min)
- Production company: MD Productions

Original release
- Network: Hum TV
- Release: 14 April – 13 May 2021

Tanaa Banaa is a Pakistani Ramadan special romantic teen drama television series Created and developed by Shahzad Javed, Head of Content, HUM TV, directed by Saife Hassan, written by Hassaan Imam and produced by Momina Duraid under her banner MD Productions. It features Alizeh Shah and singer Ali Zafar's brother, debutant Danyal Zafar in lead roles while Komal Rizvi, Javeria Abbasi, Aamir Qureshi, Hassan Noman and Ismat Zaidi in supporting cast. The serial aired everyday in Ramadan 2021 on Hum TV and the final episode was aired on 1st Day of Eid.

== Premise ==
The story revolves around the life of a newly married young couple Zain and Zoya. Zoya Saleem Qamar has just graduated and wants to pursue her master's degree. She presents her conditions for marriage in written form and Zain signs them without reading them. Zain believes in love after marriage and engaged to Zoya. After their engagement, the story takes a new turn and they realized the responsibilities of their relationship .

== Cast ==
=== Main ===
- Alizeh Shah as Zoya Zain Furqan/Saleem Qamar : Saleem & Mrs. Qamar's daughter; Ayesha's sister; Zain's wife.
- Danyal Zafar as Zain Furqan : Furqan and Fauzia's son; Zoya's husband.

=== Recurring ===
- Ismat Zaidi as Qamar-un-Nisa : Furqanuddin and Zeb-un-Nisa's mother.
- Javeria Abbasi as Fauzia Furqan : Furqan's wife; Zain's mother.
- Komal Rizvi as Zeb-un-Nisa Shahid aka Zebi: Shahid's wife; Bilal's mother; Furqan's sister.
- Aamir Qureshi as Furqanuddin aka Furqan : Fauzia's husband; Zaib-un-Nisa's brother; Zain's father.
- Hassan Noman as Shahid : Zeb-un-Nisa's husband; Bilal's father.
- Yashraj Vaswani as Bilal Shahid aka Billu : Shahid and Zeb-un-Nisa's son.
- Sarah Nadeem as Mrs. Saleem Qamar : Saleem's widow; Zoya and Ayesha's mother.
- Tania Amna Hussain as Ayesha Saleem Qamar : Saleem and Mrs. Qamar's daughter; Zoya's sister.
- Ilma Jaffrey as Iqra : Zoya's college friend.

== Soundtrack ==
"Tanaa Banaa"

Song by Amanat Ali
- Released: 1 May 2021
- Length: 4:08
- Label: Hum
- Composer: Naveed Nashad
- Lyricists: Imam Raza, Hassaan Imam
- Producer: MD Productions

Music video
- Music video on YouTube
