= Mera Dil Mera Dushman =

Pakistani television series

- میرا دِل میرا دشمن
- Genre: Drama; Family drama
- Written by: Mirza Asim Baig; Humera Safdar
- Directed by: Syed Ali Raza Usama
- Starring: Alizeh Shah; Yasir Nawaz; Noaman Sami; Anam Tanveer
- Country of origin: Pakistan
- Original language: Urdu
- No. of episodes: 64

Production
- Executive producer: Samina Humayun Saeed
- Producers: Humayun Saeed; Shahzad Nasib
- Running time: 35-42 minutes
- Production companies: Six Sigma Plus; Next Level Entertainment

Original release
- Network: ARY Digital
- Release: February 3, 2020 – 23 September 2020

Mera Dil, Mera Dushman (Urdu: میرا دِل میرا دشمن, lit. 'My Heart, My Enemy') is a Pakistani television series that premiered on 3 February 2020 on ARY Digital. It is directed by Syed Ali Raza Usama and co-produced by Humayun Saeed and Samina Humayun Saeed under Six Sigma Plus and Next Level Entertainment. It has Alizeh Shah, Noaman Sami, Yasir Nawaz, and Anam Tanveer in pivotal roles.

The show was on break from 18 May 2020 to 10 June 2020 due to the cast of the show contracting coronavirus and resumed from 11 June 2020.

== Plot ==
The drama is the story of a young innocent girl Mairah, (Alizeh Shah) who marries a much older man Zafar (Yasir Nawaz) for the exchange of money. Unfortunately, she comes face to face with the bitter reality that her one and only love Shameer (Noman Sami) is now her son-in-law.

== Cast ==
- Alizeh Shah as Mairah Zafar
- Yasir Nawaz as Zafar
- Laiba Khan as Ayesha Shahmeer
- Noaman Sami as Shameer
- Anam Tanveer as Shaheena Jawad
- Naveed Raza as Jawad; Mairah's brother
- Gul e Rana as Mairah's mother
- Aamna Malick as Aiman Ali, Zafar's elder brother's daughter
- Shazia Gohar as Parveen
- Saba Shah as Nirma
- Fatima Sohail as Rabiya
- Salman Saeed as Ali
- Akbar Islam as Khalid
- Fareeda Shabbir as Shagufta Zafar
- Asiya Irshad
- Malik Raza as Kamal
