= Kaisi Teri Khudgarzi =

Kaisi Teri Khudgarzi (lit. 'How Selfish of You') may refer to:

- "Kabira" (song), also known as "Kaisi Teri Khudgarzi", a song by Pritam Chakraborty, Rekha Bhardwaj and Tochi Raina from the 2013 Indian Hindi-language film Yeh Jawaani Hai Deewani
- Kaisi Teri Khudgarzi (TV series), a 2022 Pakistani Urdu-language television series
