= Gidh =

2017 film by Shamoon Abbasi

- Teaser poster
- Directed by: Shamoon Abbasi
- Story by: Zubair Abbasi
- Produced by: J.A.R Production
- Starring: Shaan Shahid; Ayesha Khan; Humayun Saeed; Sara Loren; Rahma Ali
- Cinematography: Shamoon Abbasi
- Edited by: M.Younus Shafi
- Music by: Kamran Akhtar
- Country: Pakistan
- Language: Urdu

Gidh (Urdu: گدھ, lit. "Vulture") is an unreleased Pakistani action/romance Urdu language film, directed by Shamoon Abbasi. It is produced by J.A.R Production and Shaam Films. The film stars notables actors from the Pakistan film industry, including Shaan Shahid, Sara Loren, Ayesha Khan and Syed Jibran. Film music is composed by Kamran Akhtar. A trailer for the film was released in October 2014.

== Synopsis ==
Love finds betrayal asking for justice and corruption seeking revenge. All takes place in a world full of glitz and glamour, where all is not what it seems, and the humanity of one man is tested and threatened. This film is about loss, anger, and revenge entangled in the lives of film stars, press and police.

== Cast ==
- Shaan Shahid
- Humayun Saeed
- Ayesha Khan
- Sara Loren
- Syed Jibran
- Hamza Ali Abbasi
- Rahma Ali

== Music ==
Gidh will have six original songs and be a music driven film. The soundtrack of the film is composed by Kamran Akhtar. According to media reports, Gidh soundtrack features heart-breaking voices like Rahat Fateh Ali Khan, Shujat Ali Khan, Amanat Ali and Indian singer Sukhwinder Singh as playback singers.
