= Thora Sa Aasman =

Pakistani television series

- Genre: Family drama Romantic drama
- Written by: Umera Ahmed
- Directed by: Nadeem Siddiqui
- Country of origin: Pakistan
- Original language: Urdu
- No. of episodes: 21

Production
- Producer: Hassan Zia
- Camera setup: Multi-camera setup
- Production company: Mastermind Productions

Original release
- Network: Har Pal Geo
- Release: 16 July – 13 November 2016

Thora Sa Aasman (Urdu: تھوڑا سا آسماں, lit. 'A Little Bit of the Sky') is a 2016 Pakistani television series based on the novel of the same name written by Umera Ahmed. The serial is directed by Nadeem Siddiqui and produced by Hassan Zia under the banner of "Mastermind Productions". It revolves around six women from different social backgrounds and their individual struggles.

It was the second adaptation of Ahmed's novel following the 2009 adaptation by Kazim Pasha which aired on PTV. In March 2016, Over contempt petition for plagiarising Ahmad's novel, Lahore High Court issues notice to the director of FIA.

== Cast ==
- Yasra Rizvi as Fatima Mukhtar
- Zeba Bakhtiyar as Shaista Kamal, Haroon's wife
- Ushna Shah as Rakhshi
- Lubna Aslam as Muneeza, Mansoor's wife
- Alyy Khan as Haroon Kamal
- Seher Afzal as Amber, Mansoor's first daughter
- Sheen Javed as Zarka
- Babar Ali as Mansoor
- Qaiser Nizamani as Baqir Sheerazi
- Kaif Ghaznavi as Saiqa, Rakhshi's mother
- Alizey Tahir as Safiya, Mansoor's second daughter
- Shaheen Khan as Ammi
- Sabahat Ali Bukhari as Aapa
- Qazi Wajid as Shaista's father
- Parveen Akbar as Asghari Bi
- Fauzia Mushtaq as Fatima's mother
- Tauqeer Ahmed as Roshan, Mansoor's son
- Hareb Farooq as Shaheer
- Malik Raza as Fatima's brother
- Anwar Iqbal as Masood
- Omair Leghari as Talha
- Jahanzeb Khan as Osama
- Jia Shahid
- Adnan Jilani as Zafar
- Imran Ashraf as Samar
- Naeem Malik as Azhar
- Kausar Siddiqui as Aasiya
- Mehboob Sultan
- Khushi Maheen as Young Rakshi

== See also ==
- Geo TV
- List of Pakistani television series
- List of programs broadcast by Geo Entertainment
