= Uroosa Qureshi =

Pakistani actress and model

Uroosa Qureshi is a Pakistani television actress and model. She is best known for her roles in Meenu Ka Susral, Daagh, and Sartaj Mera Tu Raaj Mera, for which she was nominated for Best Soap Actress at the 4th Hum Awards.

== Television ==
- Meenu Ka Susral
- Gila Kis Se Karein (2015)
- Daagh (2015)
- Kala Jadoo
- Sartaj Mera Tu Raaj Mera
- Piya Ka Ghar Pyara Lagay
- Sitara Jahan Ki Betiyaan
- Choti Choti Khushiyaan
- Mohe Piya Rang Laaga
- Soteli Maamta

== Awards and nominations ==
- Hum Award for Best Soap Actress - Sartaj Mera Tu Raaj Mera
