= Unsuni =

2015 Pakistani TV series

- Genre: Drama; Romance, Love–hate relationship
- Written by: Khalil-Ur-Rehman Qamar
- Directed by: Ehraz Ali Mirza
- Starring: Mehwish Hayat; Sajid Hasan; Junaid Khan; Zainab Qayyum; Shehryar Zaidi; Shamim Hilaly; Zulqarnain Haider; Maham Amir
- Opening theme: 'Zaruri Tha' by Rahat Fateh Ali Khan
- Composer: Sahir Ali Bagga
- Country of origin: Pakistan
- Original languages: Urdu; Punjabi
- No. of episodes: 26

Production
- Producer: Sajid Hasan
- Production locations: Karachi and Islamabad (Pakistan)
- Camera setup: Multi-Camera
- Running time: 35-40 minutes

Original release
- Network: PTV Home
- Release: 2015

Unsuni (Urdu: ان سنی) is a 2015 Pakistani Urdu-language drama serial that aired on Pakistan Television Corporation. It is written by Khalil-Ur-Rehman Qamar, and directed by Ehraz Ali Mirza.

== Plot ==
Two persons love each other in the way that they are ready to sacrifice everything for each other. They are walking on separate paths but their souls are always together. They never want to go away from each other. The dialogues of the drama are the main cause of the success of the drama.

== Cast ==
- Mehwish Hayat as Sadaf Munir
- Sajid Hasan as Mukhtar
- Junaid Khan as Yasif Hassan
- Zainab Qayyum as Zoya
- Shehryar Zaidi as Quddus Bilgrami
- Shamim Hilaly as Sadaf's mother
- Zulqarnain Haider as Hassan Mustafa
- Bilal Chaudhary as Farzand Ali
- Maham Amir as Zara
- Faris
