= Balaa =

2018 Pakistani drama serial aired on ARY Digital

- Balaa title card
- Genre: Psychological Thriller Crime
- Written by: Zanjabeel Asim Shah
- Directed by: Badar Mehmood
- Presented by: Big Bang Entertainment
- Starring: Bilal Abbas Khan; Ushna Shah
- Theme music composer: Waqar Ali
- Country of origin: Pakistan
- Original language: Urdu
- No. of episodes: 40

Production
- Producers: Fahad Mustafa; Dr. Ali Kazmi
- Production locations: Karachi, Pakistan
- Running time: 40 minutes

Original release
- Network: ARY Digital
- Release: 3 September 2018 – 14 January 2019

Related
- Bay Dardi; Bandish

Balaa (Urdu: بلا, lit. 'Monster') is a 2018 Pakistani thriller television series that aired on ARY Digital. It is produced by Fahad Mustafa and Dr. Ali Kazmi under their banner Big Bang Entertainment. It stars Bilal Abbas Khan, Ushna Shah, Azekah Daniel, Samina Peerzada, Sajid Hassan, Ismat Zaidi and Mehar Bano. The series follows the story of a girl who has a limp and who destroys the lives of people around her due to her own insecurities.

== Plot ==
Nigar (Ushna Shah) is a selfish and cruel girl who has had a limp since birth. She never lets her imperfection be an obstacle in her way. However, she intends to harm others for the sake of her ego. Her cruel attitude is because of her father, Zafar (Sajid Hassan) who also has the same mindset as Nigar and has spoiled her because she has been lucky for him since her birth. Zafar also has a son, Junaid (Asad Siddiqui) who is not as special for him as Nigar is. Junaid has married an orphaned girl, Zeba, who doesn't have a wealthy background contrary to the money-minded Zafar's wishes. Nigar also mistreats her and uses every occasion to make her life difficult. Zafar and Nigar have always wanted to get rid of her.

Nigar is in love with her cousin, Taimoor (Bilal Abbas Khan), a handsome and family-oriented man whose family she and Zafar have had been degrading for their low status in the past but not anymore, as now Taimoor is living a successful life. Taimoor loves Saba (Azekah Daniel), the only daughter of his mother's friend (Ismat Zaidi). This makes her become Nigar's second target. Fortunately, she catches Saba with her boyfriend, Mateen, and provokes them to elope, on the day of nikkah as she will aid them. She also uses Mateen to make mute calls to Zeba (Ammara Chaudhary),so Junaid suspects that she is having an affair. So, as planned, Saba elopes with Mateen on the day of nikkah with an apology note and her poor mother dies of embarrassment. Taimoor also gets badly heartbroken.

Nigar succeeds in clearing the second target and has also partially cleared the first target. The leftover part is done by Zafar, who bribes Mateen to be in Zeba's room when she's home alone. The plan is followed to perfection and Junaid arrives at the moment. Zafar and Nigar succeed in making Junaid divorce Zeba although she tries her best to prove her sincerity. The next morning, Zeba is found dead in the washroom. The cause is revealed to be a brain hemorrhage. Mission accomplished.

Now, Nigar heads for heartbroken Taimoor. She gradually lures him out of his sorrow and makes him like her. Although Junaid is also badly suffering from the trauma of his wife's death, she doesn't care at all. She has her eyes fixed on Taimoor. She eventually starts mixing up with Taimoor's family. Taimoor's mother, Shama (Samina Peerzada) is a very gentle and caring woman who easily agrees to accept Nigar, although Nigar has been rude to her in the past. Taimoor's younger sister, Batool (Mehar Bano) resists Nigar's presence but her mother won't consider her objection as she wants her son's prosperity back. Saleha (Mehwish Qureshi), Taimoor's older sister, is also an unadorned lady just like her mother but her simplicity is way too elaborated that she can't differentiate what's bad and good. In simple words, she is a type of immature. On the other hand, Batool is a clever, liberal, and sensible girl who easily indicates Nigar's intentions.

Somehow, Taimoor gets affectionate towards Nigar. Zafar conditions the marriage to be a watta satta. Batool doesn't want to marry a heartbroken Junaid who has also become bad-tempered and has taken up drinking. So, Nigar assures her father that she will marry Batool to Junaid after she marries Taimoor. So, Zafar agrees.

On the wedding night, Taimoor describes his family's importance to her and she should also give them a priority. As it was against Nigar's aptitude, she is overwhelmed and resists in her own gesticulations. Now, Nigar's pivot motive was to get rid of the whole of Taimoor's family. She uses Shama's submissive attitude as her base. Nigar emotionally forces Shama to be a bit distant from Taimoor so he could spend more time with her. Shama foresees heartbroken Taimoor's prosperity in this so she starts being distant from Taimoor. At first, Taimoor objects the weird attitude of his mother but later, he accepts that as a regular fact. And now Shama is not in her way. Now Nigar's next target is Batool.

However Nigar makes Taimoor convinced for Batool and Junaid marriage. After Batool's marriage Taimoor got to know about the truth that Junaid has not left beer. After some days Batool dies accidentally as she comes in front when Junaid was firing and her body falls in the pool. When Taimoor reaches there Nigar set up an act and blamed Batool's ex for her death. The whole family is heartbroken. Now the next target of Nigar was Saleeha. Nigar knew that Saleeha has ovary cancer which can be recovered. But she didn't tell anyone. After some time Saleeha died.

Then after a long leap, the story continues where now Taimoor has a child, Saad, and Shama is mentally ill. As time went by, Taimoor knew about his wife and her wrongdoings. Nigar wanted Shama to die. Now Saba is back as Mateen divorced her and now she doesn't have any money. Shama starts visiting her every day. while searching Shama, Taimoor reaches to Saba's house, which annoyed Nigar. A while later, Shama dies due to a heart attack.

Later Taimoor discovers the shocking truth and the acts of his wife by Saba and Batool's ex. Full of rage and vengeance, Taimoor plans to make his wife pays for her sins.

To succeed in his revenge scheme, Taimoor marries Saba and with the help of Saba, he psychologically makes Nigar go crazy and manages to convince and manipulate Zafar into giving her a very high dose of medicine. After succeeding in his plan and getting his revenge, Taimoor reveals his true nature to a horrified Zafar and the consequences of what he has done. He then reveals that he holds all the cards and then banishes Zafar from the home he once resided in.

Zafar horrified and left with nothing goes to the prison to tell his son Junaid everything. Zafar then goes to see his once stable daughter to see that she is nothing but a shell of her former self. Zafar, with nothing left walks away leaving his daughter and goes to a home.

== Cast ==
- Ushna Shah as Nigar; Disabled (limps from birth), Taimoor's cousin and later wife, Shama's niece
- Bilal Abbas Khan as Taimoor; Nigar's husband, later married Saba
- Azekah Daniel as Saba; Taimoor's love interest and later second wife
- Samina Peerzada as Shama; Taimoor's mother, Nigar and Saba's aunt
- Sajid Hassan as Zafar; Nigar and Junaid's father
- Mehar Bano as Batool; Taimoor's younger sister, Junaid's wife
- Asad Siddiqui as Junaid; Nigar's brother, Batool's husband
- Mehwish Qureshi as Saleha; Taimoor's elder sister
- Ammara Chaudhary as Zeba; Junaid's ex-wife
- Ismat Zaidi as Saba's mother, Shama's friend
- Farah Nadeem as Saleha's mother-in-law

== Reception ==
It gained acclaim for its unique storyline. Sadaf Haider of DAWN praised the series saying, "So far Balaa has been an entertaining with some tight direction and intriguing characters", she further praised Shah's character calling her "highly developed female character". Reviewer from Daily Times praised Khan performance saying, "The actor has left people awestruck with his intense acting". The show has gotten a good response from the viewers; being the top drama series in Monday slot airing in Pakistan. It also faced competition with Aatish of Hum TV and Tum Se Hi Talluq Hai of Geo Entertainment and became a slot leader instantly, and it got highest TRP of 8.9 and Peak Ratings of 11.2 . It was also criticized of its unnecessarily killing many characters. Khan and Peerzada won Best Actor and Best Supporting Actress respectively at annual ARY Social Media Awards.

== International Broadcast ==
Country	Network	Local title	Series premiere
Somaliland	Horn Cable Television	Xumaanta qarsoon	April 2020
Middle East	MBC Bollywood	أحقاد خفية	April 2020
Iran	MBC Persia	نفرت پنھان	May 2020

== Soundtrack ==
Balaa

Soundtrack album by Faiza Mujahid Zohaib Hassan
- Released: 18 September 2018
- Recorded: 2018
- Genre: Television soundtrack
- Length: (4:29)
- Language: Urdu
- Label: ARY Digital

Music video
- "Balaa" OST on YouTube

=== Track listing ===
All lyrics are written by Sabir Zafar; all music is composed by Waqar Ali.

No.	Title	Artist(s)	Length
1.	"Man Mora Laage Nahi"	Faiza Mujahid	1:43
2.	"Tere Ishq Mein"	Zaheer Abbas	2:20

== Awards and nominations ==
Year	Award	Category	Recipient(s)	Result	Ref.
2019	ARY Digital- Social Media Drama Awards 2018	Best Drama Serial -2018	Balaa	Nominated	
2019	ARY Digital- Social Media Drama Awards 2018	Best Actor Male (Serial)	Bilal Abbas Khan	Won	
2019	ARY Digital- Social Media Drama Awards 2018	Best Actor Female (Serial)	Ushna Shah	Nominated	
2019	ARY Digital- Social Media Drama Awards 2018	Best Supporting Actor (Male)	Asad Siddiqui	Nominated	
2019	ARY Digital- Social Media Drama Awards 2018	Best Supporting Actor (Female)	Samina Peerzada	Won	
2019	ARY Digital- Social Media Drama Awards 2018	Best Script Writer	Zanjabeel Asim Shah	Nominated	
2019	Lux Style Awards	Best TV Actor (Viewer's choice)	Bilal Abbas	Nominated	
2019	Lux Style Awards	Best TV Actor (Critic's choice)	Bilal Abbas	Nominated	
2019	Lux Style Awards	Best TV Actress (Viewer's choice)	Ushna Shah	Nominated	
2019	Lux Style Awards	Best TV Actress (Critic's choice)	Ushna Shah	Nominated	
2019	Lux Style Awards	Best TV Writer	Zanjabeel Asim Shah	Nominated	
