= Choti (TV series) =

Pakistani drama television series

- Title screen
- چھوٹی
- Genre: Soap opera Social; Thriller
- Written by: Rukhsana Nigar
- Directed by: Ali Faizan
- Starring: Sara Kashif; Sanam Chaudhry; Asma Abbas; Yasra Rizvi; Ali Shaikh; Yasir Mazhar; Sukaina Khan; Saniya Shamshad
- Country of origin: Pakistan
- Original language: Urdu
- No. of seasons: 1
- No. of episodes: 100

Production
- Producers: Asif Raza Mir; Babar Javed
- Production location: Karachi
- Running time: 17-25 minutes
- Production companies: A & B Entertainment

Original release
- Network: Geo Entertainment
- Release: 17 October 2014 – 12 June 2015

Choti or Chhoti (Urdu: چھوٹی, lit. 'Youngest') is a Pakistani television drama soap serial aired on Geo Entertainment. The serial is written by Rukhsana Nigar and produced by Asif Raza Mir and Babar Javed under their production banner, A&B Productions. It stars Sara Kashif, Sanam Chaudhry, Asma Abbas, Yasir Mazhar, Ali Shaikh and Yasra Rizvi in lead roles initially joined by Saniya Shamshad, Azekah Daniel, Asad Siddiqui and Farwa Kazmi later. The story is about difficulties coming into Choti's life. The show also tells about social problems and devils in our society and how middle-class and poor people face them.

== Cast ==
- Saniya Shamshad as Najia\Jia aka Choti- Rasheeda and Fareed youngest daughter, who works as maid and gives company to Naila's daughter but is later adopted by Hassan.
- Shaista Jabeen as Rasheeda- Choti's mother. A poverty-stricken and stone hearted mother working as a maid who wants her daughters to do the same to earn a living for the family.
- Sanam Chaudhry as Saira- Elder daughter of Rasheeda. A caring sister who doesn't want "Chhoti" to work as maid.
- Asma Abbas as Begum- A cruel wealthy woman who detests poor people.
- Aliee Shaikh as Noman- Younger son of Begum and a spoiled brat. He wants his share of the family business to fulfil his girlfriend's desires. He mentally harasses, bullies, and abuses "Chhoti" and tries to harass Saira too.
- Yasir Mazhar as Usman- Elder son of Begum. A responsible son, who doesn't want to give Noman his business shares due to his non-seriousness towards business.
- Salma Hassan as Naila- Usman's wife. She is kind hearted and hires "Chhoti" to spend time with her daughter.
- Taifoor Khan as Dr. Hassan- Noman's friend. He has a complicated relationship with his wife, Amna, due to her carefree attitude towards their daughter, Honey and Amna's past relationship with Dawood.
- Yasra Rizvi as Dr. Amna- Hassan's wife. She is more concerned towards her career which leads to her daughter having mental problems.
- Rahma Ali as Rohina aka Rohi- love interest of Noman. She's greedy, stubborn and wants to marry Noman on certain conditions. She was married to Aadil before and hides this from Noman and his family but despite all this still marries Noman secretly.
- Sukaina Khan as Ruqaiyya- Middle daughter of Rasheeda.
- Seemi Pasha as Salma- Rohina's mother. She wants Rohina to tell to Noman's family about Aadil.
- Minhaj Askari as Khalid- Saira's fiance but doubts her as he has seen her with Noman few times.
- Farah Nadir as Abida- Khalid's mother and Rasheeda's sister.
- Amir Mustafa Qureshi as Dr.Dawood/Aadil- Amna's past love interest who comes back in her life and Rohina's first husband.
- Uzair Abbasi as Fareed- Saira, Ruqaiyya, Billu and Choti's father.
- Rehana Kaleem as Nasreen- Maid at Begum's home.
- Shehzad Mukhtar as Riaz- Rohina's father.
- Asad Siddiqui as Umair - Arifa's brother and Naila's nephew
- Azekah Daniel as Pinky- Naila and Usman daughter
- Afraz Rasool as Sheeraz- Naila and Usman son
- Farwa Kazmi as Arifa- Sheeraz's fiance and Naila's niece
- Farah Nadeem as Aapa

=== Child stars ===
- Sara Kashif as Choti- Rasheeda and Fareed youngest daughter
- Zainab Imdad as Honey- Amna and Hassan daughter
- Ashan Zeeshan as Sheeraz aka Shehzi- Naila and Usman son
- Fatima Kamran as Pinky- Naila and Usman daughter
- Saifullah Sohail as Bilal aka Billu- Rasheeda and Fareed only son, who's sick and can't work.
- Hira Ahmed as Arifa- Naila's niece
- Murtaza Sohail as Umair- Naila's nephew

== Release ==
The serial started airing on 2 May 2014 and few episodes aired already but due to Geo TV's controversy, the show was pulled off along with other shows on the channel. It was released on 17 October again airing from Friday to Sunday at 7:30 PM.
