= Laiba Khan =

Pakistani actress and model

- لائبہ خان
- Born: 27 January 1997 (age 29); Karachi, Sindh, Pakistan
- Education: University of Karachi
- Occupation: Actress
- Years active: 2019 – present
- Spouse: Jawad Ali (m. 2024)

Laiba Khan (Urdu: لائبہ خان; born 27 January 1997) is a Pakistani actress and model who works primarily in Urdu television. She began her acting career in 2018 and has appeared in television dramas including Do Bol, Mera Dil Mera Dushman, Kaisi Teri Khudgarzi, Zindagi Aik Paheli, Baylagaam, Kaffara, Aafat, Aas Paas, Humraaz and Mohra.

In 2024, Khan portrayed Sitara in the Geo Entertainment romantic drama Kaffara. The serial surpassed one billion views during its run. She subsequently portrayed Warisha in Aafat.

== Early life ==
Khan was born on 27 January 1997 in Karachi, Sindh, Pakistan. Her younger sister, Emaan Khan, has also worked as an actress. The sisters have appeared together in media interviews and social-media content.

== Personal life ==
Khan married businessman Jawad Ali in a private nikah ceremony in Medina, Saudi Arabia, in November 2024. She publicly announced the marriage in January 2026 following her wedding celebrations.

== Career ==
=== Early career (2018–2020) ===
Khan began her acting career in 2018 with a supporting role as Anam in the ARY Digital drama Babban Khala Ki Betiyann. The series continued until 2019. In 2019, she portrayed Rafia in the romantic drama Do Bol. The same year, she appeared as Annie in Mala Mir and as Sadia in Pakeeza Phuppo.

In 2020, Khan appeared as Ayesha Shahmeer in Mera Dil Mera Dushman. She also portrayed Hania in the Hum TV drama Tarap and appeared in the anthology series Dikhawa. During this period, she also appeared in the short film Chamak, portraying Shahida.

=== Established roles (2021–2023) ===
In 2021, Khan appeared as Noshaba in Dulhan, Anzhee in Ajnabi Humsafar, and Anoushay in Bechari Qudsia. She also appeared in separate episodes of Dikhawa.

In 2022, Khan portrayed Nayab in Angana and played the title character in Haseena, one of her early lead roles. She also appeared as Sofia in Ishq Bepanah, Nida in Kaisi Teri Khudgarzi, and Zara in Inteqam. From 2022 to 2023, she portrayed Fizza in Muqaddar Ka Sitara and Faiza in Zindagi Aik Paheli.

In 2023, Khan portrayed Rabail in Tere Aane Se. She subsequently played Ramsha in the Geo Entertainment drama Baylagaam, which continued into 2024.

=== Further recognition (2024–present) ===
In 2024, Khan appeared in the television films Tankhwa and Hasool E Ishq. She subsequently portrayed Sitara in the Geo Entertainment romantic drama Kaffara. The serial surpassed one billion views during its run. She later portrayed Warisha in Aafat and Tania in Kaisi Hai Ye Ruswai.

In 2025, Khan appeared as Aina in Sitaron Se Aagay and portrayed Arshia in the Ramadan series Aas Paas. She subsequently played Mishal in Humraaz and Alizey in Mohra.

In 2026, Khan was cast as Shifa in Tapish.

== Filmography ==
=== Television ===
Year	Title	Role	Network	Notes	Ref.
2018–2019	Babban Khala Ki Betiyann	Anam	ARY Digital		
2019	Do Bol	Rafia	ARY Digital		
2019	Mala Mir	Annie	A-Plus TV		
2019	Pakeeza Phuppo	Sadia	ARY Digital		
2020	Dikhawa		Geo Entertainment	Anthology series	
2020	Mera Dil Mera Dushman	Ayesha Shahmeer	ARY Digital		
2020	Tarap	Hania	Hum TV		
2021	Dikhawa	Fatima	Geo Entertainment	Episode: "Sanad"	
2021	Dulhan	Noshaba	Hum TV		
2021	Ajnabi Humsafar	Anzhee	SAB TV Pakistan		
2021	Bechari Qudsia	Anoushay	Geo Entertainment		
2021	Dikhawa	Heera	Geo Entertainment	Episode: "Jhansa"	
2022	Ishq Bepanah	Sofia	Express Entertainment		
2022	Angana	Nayab	ARY Digital		
2022	Haseena	Haseena	A-Plus TV	Lead role	
2022	Kaisi Teri Khudgarzi	Nida	ARY Digital		
2022	Inteqam	Zara	SAB TV Pakistan		
2022–2023	Muqaddar Ka Sitara	Fizza	ARY Digital		
2022–2023	Zindagi Aik Paheli	Faiza	Geo Entertainment		
2023	Tere Aane Se	Rabail	Geo Entertainment		
2023	Baylagaam	Ramsha	Geo Entertainment		
2024	Tankhwa	Faiza	BOL Entertainment	Television film	
2024	Hasool E Ishq	Zara	SAB TV Pakistan	Television film	
2024	Kaffara	Sitara	Geo Entertainment		
2024	Aafat	Warisha	Geo Entertainment		
2024	Kaisi Hai Ye Ruswai	Tania	Express Entertainment		
2025	Sitaron Se Aagay	Aina	Express Entertainment		
2025	Aas Paas	Arshia	Geo Entertainment	Ramadan series	
2025	Humraaz	Mishal	Geo Entertainment		
2025	Mohra	Alizey	Geo Entertainment		
2026	Tapish	Shifa			

=== Short films ===
Year	Title	Role	Ref.
2020	Chamak	Shahida	
2022	Mere Sapnon Ki Rani	Husnara	
2023	Bad Luck	Ainan	
2023	Ghanti	Saira	
2025	Ijazat		

=== Music videos ===
Year	Title	Artist	Ref.
2021	Saaz-e-Dil	Aashir Wajahat	
