= Djuice =

Youth-based mobile plan from Telenor

- Company type: Subsidiary
- Industry: Telecommunication
- Founded: 2000; 26 years ago
- Headquarters: Norway
- Products: Telephony, EDGE, GSM, WCDMA, 3G, 4G
- Website: www.djuice.com

Djuice (short for 'digital juice') was a youth-based mobile phone plan from Telenor.

== History ==
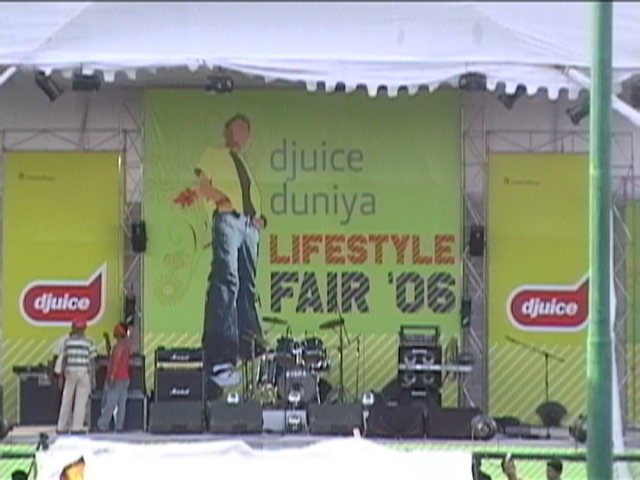
A Djuice Lifestyle Fair Concert, Rajshahi, Bangladesh

Djuice was launched in Bangladesh by Grameenphone on 14 April 2005, during the Bengali New Year. In March 2006, Djuice was launched by Telenor Group of Pakistan. On 14 April 2007, Djuice Bangladesh rebranded to Djuice. Djuice Bangladesh has a show called dRockstars.

In 2012, the brand Djuice was merged with Telenor, and all the balances of the Djuice customers accounts were confiscated by Telenor. In October 2013, Ukrainian mobile operator Kyivstar stopped offering mobile plans under the brand Djuice.

In September 2018 Djuice Pakistan Discontinued end 12 years

== Pakistan ==
- March 2006 Launched Variety of Packages
