= Angeline Malik =

Pakistani actor and model

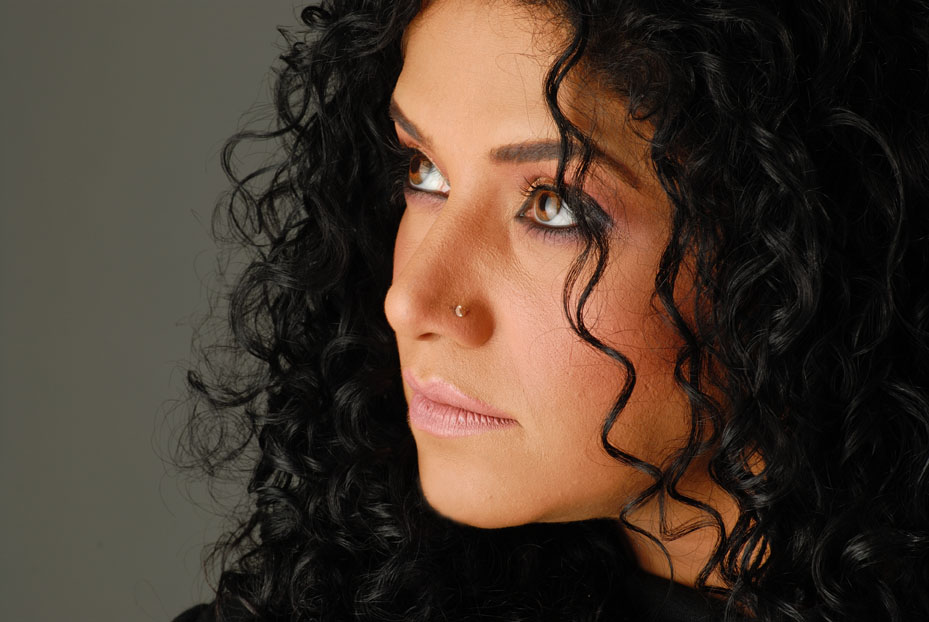
- Born: Angeline Malik
- Occupation: Filmmaker
- Years active: 2000–present

Angeline Malik is a Pakistani filmmaker.

== Early life ==
Malik has one elder brother and sister, Dr. Arshad Khan Malik and Amberine Khan, residing in Islamabad with her mother, Anees Khan Malik, and a younger sister, Alvera Khan, residing in Europe. Her late father, Professor M. Aslam Khan Malik, was an ophthalmologist and professor known for his humanitarian and charity work. She resides in Karachi.

== Filmography ==
=== As a director ===
Year	Show	Network	Notes	Ref(s).
2008	Rani	PTV	Drama Serial	
2011-2014	Kitni Girhain Baqi Hain	Hum TV	113 episodes	
2018	Ustani Jee	Hum TV		
2018	Kabhi Band Kabhi Baja	Express Entertainment		
2019	Choti Choti Batain	Hum TV		
2019	Pinky ka Dulha	Hum TV		

=== As an actor ===
==== Films ====
Year	Title	Notes	Ref(s).
2008	Kala Pul		
2018	Azad		
2019	Kalasha	In post-production	
2019	Baaji	Creative Producer	

==== Television ====
Year	Title	Role	Network	Notes	Ref(s).
2001	Ek Gharana			Soap	
2001	Musafir Din Musafir Raatien			Indus Media Group	
2002	Reshma to Jhali Hay			Telefilm	
2008	Rani		PTV	Drama Serial	
2009	Aashti	Zarnish	Hum TV	Drama Series	
2011-2014	Kitni Girhain Baqi Hain		Hum TV		
2011	Akhri Barish	Zeenat	Hum TV		
2012	Sitamgar	Sheena			
2013	Kadoorat	Atiqa			
2016	Pakeeza	Naila	Hum TV	Drama Serial	
2020	Mohabbat Tujhe Alvida	Mrs. Ikhlaaq	Hum TV		
2021	Dobara	Mahir's mother	Hum TV		
2021	Mere Humsafar	Hala's stepmother	ARY Digital		
2022	Mujhe Pyaar Hua Tha	Areeb's mother	ARY Digital		
2026	Meri Zindagi Hai Tu	Fariya's mother	ARY Digital		

=== As a producer ===
Year	Show	Network	Notes	Ref(s).
2008	Rani	PTV	Drama Serial	
2011-2014	Kitni Girhain Baqi Hain	Hum TV	113 episodes	
2018	Ustani Jee	Hum TV		
2018	Kabhi Band Kabhi Baja	Express Entertainment		
2019	Choti Choti Batain	Hum TV		
2019	Pinky ka Dulha	Hum TV		
