= Lux Style Award for Best TV Actress =

Pakistani media award

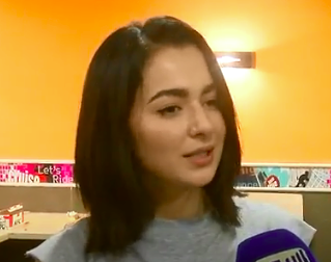
- The 2025 recipient: Hania Aamir for Kabhi Main Kabhi Tum
- Awarded for: Best TV Actress
- Country: Pakistan
- Presented by: Unilever Pakistan
- First award: Sadia Imam (2002)
- Currently held by: Hania Amir (2025)

The Lux Style Award for Best TV Actress is given by the Lux as part of its annual Lux Style Awards for best performance by an actress in a Pakistani TV series as voted by the general public.

The award was first given in 2002, during the first Lux ceremony.

== Winners and nominations ==
Listed below are the winners of the award for each year, as well as the other nominees.

Key	Meaning
	Indicates the winning actress

=== 2000s ===
Year	Actress	Role	TV series	Network
2001 (1st)
2001 (1st)	Sadia Imam	N/A	N/A	N/A
2001 (1st)	Sania Saeed	N/A	N/A	N/A
2001 (1st)	Nadia Jamil	N/A	N/A	N/A
2001 (1st)	Samina Ahmad	N/A	N/A	N/A
2001 (1st)	Saba Hameed	N/A	N/A	N/A
2002 (2nd)
2002 (2nd)	Sania Saeed	N/A	Shayad Ke Phir Bahar Aaye	PTV
2002 (2nd)	Aaminah Haq	N/A	Singhaar	PTV
2002 (2nd)	Nadia Jamil	N/A	Faisla	PTV
2002 (2nd)	Faryal Gohar	Abginey Aamir	Chaandni Raatain	PTV
2003 (3rd)
2003 (3rd)	Aaminah Haq	Alishba	Mehndi	PTV
2003 (3rd)	Sonia Rehman	N/A	Ambulance	Indus Vision
2003 (3rd)	Sania Saeed	N/A	Thori Si Mohabbat	Geo Entertainment
2003 (3rd)	Bushra Ansari	Khanum Jaan	Umrao Jaan Ada	Geo Entertainment
2003 (3rd)	Savera Nadeem	N/A	Ibn e Aadam	ARY Digital
2004 (4th)	Terrestrial			
2004 (4th)	Sadia Imam	N/A	Hum Se Juda Na Hona	PTV
2004 (4th)	Wajeeha Ali	N/A	Pooray Chaand Ki Raat	PTV
2004 (4th)	Sara Loren	N/A	Mah-e-Neem	PTV
2004 (4th)	Uzma Gillani	N/A	Pataal	PTV
2004 (4th)	Naheed Shabbir	N/A	Bezubaan	PTV
2004 (4th)	Satellite			
2004 (4th)	Reema Khan	N/A	Yaad Toh Aayegi	Geo Entertainment
2004 (4th)	Atiqa Odho	N/A	Dhool	ARY Digital
2004 (4th)	Maria Wasti	Kausar	Moorat	ARY Digital
2004 (4th)	Saba Hameed	N/A	Woh Tees Din	Geo Entertainment
2004 (4th)	Samina Peerzada	N/A	Ana	Geo Entertainment
2005 (5th)	Terrestrial			
2005 (5th)	Saira Khan	N/A	Beti	PTV
2005 (5th)	Shagufta Ejaz	N/A	Beti	PTV
2005 (5th)	Sabreen Hisbani	N/A	Masuri	PTV
2005 (5th)	Pushpa Narayan	N/A	Masuri	PTV
2005 (5th)	Robina Naz	N/A	Aadhi Dhoop	PTV
2005 (5th)	Satellite			
2005 (5th)	Maria Wasti	Ayesha	Riyasat	ARY Digital
2005 (5th)	Nadia Jamil	Emaan	Meray Paas Paas	Hum TV
2005 (5th)	Angeline Malik	Khadija/ Katherine	La Hasil	Hum TV
2005 (5th)	Farah Shah	N/A	Partition - Aik Safar	Geo Entertainment
2005 (5th)	Iffat Rahim	N/A	Bano Ko Pehchano	Geo Entertainment
2006 (6th)	Terrestrial			
2006 (6th)	Samina Peerzada	N/A	Kath Putli	PTV
2006 (6th)	Beenish Chohan	N/A	Malangi	PTV
2006 (6th)	Sara Chaudhary	N/A	Sadoori	PTV
2006 (6th)	Saba Hameed	N/A	Gharoor	PTV
2006 (6th)	Sofia Mirza	N/A	Gul Bushra	PTV
2006 (6th)	Satellite			
2006 (6th)	Bushra Ansari	Savera	Kuch Dil Ne Kaha	Geo Entertainment
2006 (6th)	Maria Wasti	Shaista	Kuch Dil Ne Kaha	Geo Entertainment
2006 (6th)	Saba Hameed	N/A	Tere Ishq Mein	Geo Entertainment
2006 (6th)	Sadia Imam	N/A	Dohri	ARY Digital
2006 (6th)	Sonia Rehman	Nina	Pehchaan	Hum TV
2007 (7th)	Terrestrial			
2007 (7th)	Beenish Chohan	N/A	Pehli Boond	PTV
2007 (7th)	Azra Aftab	N/A	Hazaroan Khwahishein	ATV
2007 (7th)	Javeria Abbasi	N/A	Sukhan	ATV
2007 (7th)	Rabia Tabbasum	N/A	Muqaddar Kahan Se Layen	ATV
2007 (7th)	Salma Zafar	N/A	Lyari Express	PTV
2007 (7th)	Terrestrial			
2007 (7th)	Bushra Ansari	N/A	Vanee	Geo Entertainment
2007 (7th)	Saba Hameed	N/A	Vanee	Geo Entertainment
2007 (7th)	Savera Nadeem	N/A	Shikwah	Geo Entertainment
2007 (7th)	Resham	Zainab	Man-o-Salwa	Hum TV
2007 (7th)	Javeria Abbasi	Najia	Najia	Hum TV
2008 (8th)	Terrestrial			
2008 (8th)	Saima Noor	N/A	Nautankee	ATV
2008 (8th)	Erum Akhtar	N/A	Kabhi Aaye Naa Judai	ATV
2008 (8th)	Mehreen Raheel	N/A	Kabhi Aaye Naa Judai	ATV
2008 (8th)	Naheed Shabbir	N/A	Kaanch Ke Jugnoo	ATV
2008 (8th)	Aliya Imam	N/A	Thora Sa Asman	PTV
2008 (8th)	Terrestrial			
2008 (8th)	Sania Saeed	Jhumka Jaan	Jhumka Jaan	Hum TV
2008 (8th)	Ayesha Omar	N/A	Kaisa Yeh Junoom	ARY Digital
2008 (8th)	Savera Nadeem	N/A	Milay Kuch Yun	ARY Digital
2008 (8th)	Sonia Rehman	N/A	Mohabnat Karne Walon Ke Naam	Hum TV
2008 (8th)	Resham	Rano	Muthi Bhar Chaawal	TV One
2009 (9th)	Terrestrial			
2009 (9th)	Maira Khan	N/A	Jee Chahta Hai	ATV
2009 (9th)	Angeline Malik	N/A	Rani	PTV
2009 (9th)	Juggan Kazim	N/A	Kaghaz Ki Nao	ATV
2009 (9th)	Saba Qamar	Ruqsana Inayatullah	Jinnah Ke Naam	PTV
2009 (9th)	Sara Chaudhary	N/A	Khuda Zameen Se Gaya Nahin	PTV
2009 (9th)	Terrestrial			
2009 (9th)	Sania Saeed	N/A	The Ghost	Hum TV
2009 (9th)	Resham	N/A	Aashti	Hum TV
2009 (9th)	Sanam Baloch	N/A	Noorpur Ki Rani	Hum TV
2009 (9th)	Sonia Rehman	N/A	Doraha	Geo TV
2009 (9th)	Sara Chaudhary	N/A	Teri Ik Nazar	Geo TV

=== 2010s ===
Year	Actress	Role	TV series	Network
2010 (10th)	Terrestrial			
2010 (10th)	Sania Saeed	N/A	Hawa Rait Aur Aangan	PTV
2010 (10th)	Saba Faisal	N/A	Pal Bhar Mein	ATV
2010 (10th)	Saba Qamar	Iman Anwar	Tinkay	PTV
2010 (10th)	Beenish Chohan	N/A	Ghar Ki Khatir	PTV
2010 (10th)	Erum Akhtar	Amber	Shikkan	PTV
2010 (10th)	Satellite			
2010 (10th)	Bushra Ansari	Saima Chaudhry	Dolly Ki Ayegi Baraat	Geo Entertainment
2010 (10th)	Aamina Sheikh	N/A	Agar Tum Na Hotey	Indus Vision
2010 (10th)	Savera Nadeem	Nadia	Diya Jaley	ARY Digital
2010 (10th)	Samiya Mumtaz	Saba Kareem	Meri Zaat Zarra-e-Benishan	Geo Entertainment
2010 (10th)	Sanam Baloch	Bano	Dastaan	Hum TV
2011 (11th)	Terrestrial			
2011 (11th)	Sanam Baloch	Faiza Ali Shah	Sehra Teri Pyas	PTV
2011 (11th)	Maira Khan	Sadia	Aankh Salamat Andhay Log	A-Plus TV
2011 (11th)	Sania Saeed	N/A	Aao Kahani Buntay Hain	PTV
2011 (11th)	Saba Qamar	Zartash	Tera Pyar Nahi Bhoole	PTV
2011 (11th)	Mahjabeen Sumbal	N/A	Kachra Kundi	PTV
2011 (11th)	Satellite			
2011 (11th)	Savera Nadeem	Aisha	Qaid-e-Tanhai	Hum TV
2011 (11th)	Aamina Sheikh	Umm-e-Kulsoom	Umm-e-Kulsoom	ARY Digital
2011 (11th)	Beenish Chohan	Zeenat	Mera Saaein	ARY Digital
2011 (11th)	Hina Dilpazeer	Saazein Bibi	Tum Ho Ke Chup	Geo Entertainment
2011 (11th)	Saba Qamar	Sana	Pani Jaisa Piyar	Hum TV
2012 (12th)	Terrestrial			
2012 (12th)	Mahnoor Baloch	Falak	Talafi	PTV
2012 (12th)	Fiza Ali	Lubna Hameed	Love, Life Aur Lahore	A-Plus TV
2012 (12th)	Mehwish Hayat	Zulekha	Mein	PTV
2012 (12th)	Beenish Chohan	Sandleen	Chalo Phir Se Jee Kar Dekhain	PTV
2012 (12th)	Resham	Aasiya	Ik Yaad Hai	A-Plus TV
2012 (12th)	Satellite			
2012 (12th)	Mahira Khan	Khirad	Humsafar	Hum TV
2012 (12th)	Mehwish Hayat	Maham	Meray Qatil Meray Dildar	Hum TV
2012 (12th)	Saba Qamar	Saman	Maat	Hum TV
2012 (12th)	Saba Hameed	Zareena Wahab	Man Jali	Geo Entertainment
2012 (12th)	Hina Dilpazeer	Various	Quddusi Sahab Ki Bewah	ARY Digital
2013 (13th)	Terrestrial			
2013 (13th)	Yamina Peerzada	Falak	Roshni Andhera Roshni	ATV
2013 (13th)	Mehwish Hayat	Laila	Kami Reh Gaee	PTV
2013 (13th)	Aamina Sheikh	Alizeh	Kuch Is Tarah	PTV
2013 (13th)	Mehreen Raheel	Erum	Daag-e-Nadamat	PTV
2013 (13th)	Sana Fakhar	Dil Awaiz	Dil Awaiz	PTV
2013 (13th)	Satellite			
2013 (13th)	Sanam Saeed	Kashaf Murtaza	Zindagi Gulzar Hai	Hum TV
2013 (13th)	Samina Peerzada	Shamim	Rehaai	Hum TV
2013 (13th)	Irsa Ghazal	Aapa Bi	Ullu Baraye Farokht Nahi	Hum TV
2013 (13th)	Sajal Aly	Nanhi	Nanhi	Geo Entertainment
2013 (13th)	Mehar Bano	Umama	Daagh	ARY Digital
2014 (14th)
2014 (14th)	Ayeza Khan	Farah Ibrahim	Pyarey Afzal	ARY Digital
2014 (14th)	Saba Hameed	Ruqaiyya Subhan Allah	Pyarey Afzal	ARY Digital
2014 (14th)	Sajal Aly	Pari/ Husna	Sannata	ARY Digital
2014 (14th)	Saba Qamar	Rukayya	Sannata	ARY Digital
2014 (14th)	Sanam Jung	Aimen	Mere Humdum Mere Dost	Urdu 1
2015 (15th)
2015 (15th)	Mahira Khan	Rukhsana/ Shano	Sadqay Tumhare	Hum TV
2015 (15th)	Sajal Aly	Zoya	Khuda Dekh Raha Hai	A-Plus TV
2015 (15th)	Maya Ali	Faarah Wali Khan	Diyar-e-Dil	Hum TV
2015 (15th)	Iffat Rahim	Rukhsana	Mohabbat Aag Si	Hum TV
2015 (15th)	Saima Noor	Shehnaz	Rang Laaga	ARY Digital
2016 (16th)
2016 (16th)	Maya Ali	Manahil/ Mannu	Mann Mayal	Hum TV
2016 (16th)	Saba Qamar	Surraiya/ Sitara	Mein Sitara	TV One
2016 (16th)	Saba Qamar	Mishal Tahir	Besharam	ARY Digital
2016 (16th)	Mehwish Hayat	Anmol	Dil Lagi	ARY Digital
2016 (16th)	Sajal Aly	Gul-e-Rana	Gul e Rana	Hum TV
2017 (17th)
2017 (17th)	Saba Qamar	Fauzia Batool/ Kanwal Baloch	Baaghi	Urdu 1
2017 (17th)	Sajal Aly	Zubia Khalil	Yaqeen Ka Safar	Hum TV
2017 (17th)	Sajal Aly	Sassi	O Rangreza	Hum TV
2017 (17th)	Kubra Khan	Parisa	Muqabil	ARY Digital
2017 (17th)	Bushra Ansari	Nandini Daas	Seeta Bagri	TV One
2018 (18th)
2018 (18th)	Iqra Aziz	Ajiya Nazakat Ali/ Jiya	Suno Chanda	Hum TV
2018 (18th)	Sonya Hussyn	Pakeeza Islam	Aisi Hai Tanhai	ARY Digital
2018 (18th)	Neelam Muneer	Ulfat	Dil Mom Ka Diya	ARY Digital
2018 (18th)	Ushna Shah	Nigar	Balaa	ARY Digital
2018 (18th)	Sana Javed	Sanam Khan /Khaani	Khaani	Geo Entertainment
2019 (19th)	Yumna Zaidi	Hajra Ilyas	Inkaar	Hum TV
2019 (19th)	Sajal Aly	Chammi	Aangan	Hum TV
2019 (19th)	Iqra Aziz	Noor Bano "Noori"	Ranjha Ranjha Kardi	Hum TV
2019 (19th)	Saba Qamar	Mannat Shayan	Cheekh	ARY Digital
2019 (19th)	Ayeza Khan	Mehwish	Meray Paas Tum Ho	ARY Digital

=== 2020s ===
Year	Actress	Role	TV series	Network	Ref(s)
2020 (20th)	Yumna Zaidi	Mahjabeen	Pyar Ke Sadqay	Hum TV	
2020 (20th)	Sajal Aly	Momina Sultan	Alif	Geo Entertainment	
2020 (20th)	Mawra Hocane	Anaya Hasan née Aziz	Sabaat	Hum TV	
2020 (20th)	Yumna Zaidi	Mushk	Raaz-e-Ulfat	Geo Entertainment	
2020 (20th)	Ayeza Khan	Mehrunnisa "Mehru"	Mehar Posh	Geo Entertainment	
2020 (20th)	Hiba Bukhari	Nageen Fayaz	Deewangi	Geo Entertainment	
2020 (20th)	Saboor Aly	Fariya	Fitrat	Geo Entertainment	
2021 (21st)	Ayeza Khan	Maniha "Meenu" Kifayat Faaz	Chupke Chupke	Hum TV	
2021 (21st)	Mahira Khan	Mehreen Aswad Ayub née Mansoor	Hum Kahan Ke Sachay Thay	Hum TV	
2021 (21st)	Minal Khan	Isra	Ishq Hai	ARY Digital	
2021 (21st)	Yumna Zaidi	Allah Rakhi/ Sumbul	Dil Na Umeed To Nahi	TV One	
2021 (21st)	Durefishan Saleem	Aimen	Pardes	ARY Digital	
2022 (22nd)	Yumna Zaidi	Bakhtawar	Bakhtawar	Hum TV	
2022 (22nd)	Hania Amir	Hala Hamza Ahmed née Nafees Ahmed	Mere Humsafar	ARY Digital	
2022 (22nd)	Ramsha Khan	Neha Qutub ud Din	Hum Tum	Hum TV	
2022 (22nd)	Ayeza Khan	Parisa "Pari" Ahmed	Chaudhry and Sons	Geo Entertainment	
2022 (22nd)	Hiba Bukhari	Dr. Khajistah Dilawar Khan	Meray Humnasheen	Geo Entertainment	
2025 (23rd)	Yumna Zaidi	Meerab Murtasim Khan	Tere Bin	Geo Entertainment	
2025 (23rd)	Ayeza Khan	Mubashira Jaffar	Mein	ARY Digital	
2025 (23rd)	Hania Aamir	Maheer Saad	Mujhe Pyaar Hua Tha	ARY Digital	
2025 (23rd)	Saba Qamar	Salma	Tumharay Husn Kay Naam	Green Entertainment	
2025 (23rd)	Sajal Ali	Aaliya Agha	Kuch Ankahi	ARY Digital	
2025 (24th)	Hania Aamir	Sharjeena Mustafa Ahmed	Kabhi Main Kabhi Tum	ARY Digital	
2025 (24th)	Durefishan Saleem	Shibra Shahmeer	Ishq Murshid	Hum TV	
2025 (24th)	Durefishan Saleem	Zamda Khan	Khaie	Geo Entertainment	
2025 (24th)	Sajal Aly	Maymouna aka Meenu	Zard Patton Ka Bunn	Hum TV	

== Superlatives ==
=== Multiple wins ===
- Sania Saeed-4 (1 Best TV Actress, 1 Best TV Actress-Terrestrial, 2 Best TV Actress-Satellite)
- Bushra Ansari-3 (3 Best TV Actress-Satellite)
- Yumna Zaidi-6 (4 Best TV Actress-Viewers' Choice)
- Sadia Imam-2 (1 Best TV Actress, 1 Best TV Actress-Terrestrial)
- Ayeza Khan-2 (1 Best TV Actress, 1 Best TV Actress-Viewers' Choice)
- Mahira Khan-2 (1 Best TV Actress, 1 Best TV Actress-Satellite)

=== Multiple nominations ===
2 Nominations

- Naheed Shabbir
- Angeline Malik
- Iffat Rahim
- Javeria Abbasi
- Erum Akhtar
- Mehreen Raheel
- Hina Dilpazeer
- Hiba Bukhari
- Saima Noor
- Aaminah Haq
- Maira Khan
- Maya Ali
- Iqra Aziz

3 Nominations

- Sara Chaudhary
- Nadia Jamil
- Aamina Sheikh
- Maria Wasti
- Samina Peerzada
- Sanam Baloch
- Sadia Imam
- Mahira Khan

4 Nominations

- Resham
- Sonia Rehman
- Mehwish Hayat
- Ayeza Khan

5 Nominations

- Savera Nadeem
- Beenish Chohan
- Bushra Ansari
- Yumna Zaidi

7 Nominations

- Saba Hameed
- Sania Saeed

12 Nominations

- Sajal Ali

12 Nominations

- Saba Qamar

=== Records ===
Most nominations without ever winning

- Sajal Ali (12)
- Saba Hameed (7)

Only actress to win Best TV Actress, Best TV Actress-Satellite and Best TV Actress-Terrestrial

- Sania Saeed (1, 2, 1)

Most consecutive wins

- Sania Saeed 3 (2008, 2009, 2010)
- Bushra Ansari 2 (2006, 2007)
- Yumna Zaidi 2 (2018, 2019)

Most wins for Best TV Actress-Satellite

- Bushra Ansari (3)
- Sania Saeed (2)

Most wins for Best TV Actress-Terrestrial

- No actress won the award twice

Most nominations in a single year (winning performance listed in bold)

- Saba Hameed (for Gharoor and Tere Ishq Mein in 2006)
- Javeria Abbasi (for Sukhan and Najia in 2007)
- Sara Chaudhary (for Khuda Zameen Se Gaya Nahin and Teri Ik Nazar in 2009)
- Saba Qamar (for Tera Pyar Nahi Bhoole and Pani Jaisa Pyar in 2011)
- Mehwish Hayat (for Mein and Meray Qatil Meray Dildar in 2012)
- Saba Qamar (for Mein Sitara and Besharam in 2016)
- Sajal Ali (for O Rangreza and Yaqeen Ka Safar in 2017)
- Yumna Zaidi (for **Pyar Ke Sadqay** and Raaz-e-Ulfat in 2020)

Actresses nominated for the same play in a single year (winners listed in bold)

- **Saira Khan** and Shagufta Ejaz for Beti
- Pushpa Narayan and Sabreen Hisbani for Masuri
- **Bushra Ansari** and Maria Wasti for Kuch Dil Ne Kaha
- **Bushra Ansari** and Saba Hameed for Vanee
- Erum Akhtar and Mehreen Raheel for Kabhi Aaye Naa Judai
- Saba Qamar and Sajal Ali for Sannata
- **Ayeza Khan** and Saba Hameed for Pyarey Afzal

Actresses to win for comedic Performances

- Bushra Ansari – Dolly Ki Ayegi Baraat
- Iqra Aziz – Suno Chanda
- Yumna Zaidi – Pyar Ke Sadqay
- Ayeza Khan – Chupke Chupke
