= 6th Hum Awards =

2018 Pakistani entertainment awards

- Date: 28 July 2018
- Site: FirstOntario Centre; York Boulevard, Hamilton, Ontario, Toronto, Canada
- Hosted by: Sanam Jung, Ahmed Ali Butt, Bushra Ansari, Ali Rehman Khan and Yasir Hussain
- Produced by: Hum Network

Highlights
- Best Drama Serial (Jury): Alif Allah Aur Insaan
- Best Drama Serial (Popular): Yaqeen Ka Safar
- Most awards: Alif Allah Aur Insaan

Television coverage
- Channel: Hum TV
- Network: Hum

The 6th Hum Awards by Hum Network Limited, honored the best in fashion, music, and Hum Television Dramas of 2017. It took place on 28 July 2018, at the FirstOntario Centre in Bay Street, Hamilton, Ontario at 8:00 p.m. Eastern Time Zone. Hum Awards were given in 25 categories. The ceremony was televised in Pakistan by Hum TV.

== Winners and nominees ==
On 26 June 2018, the nominees for the five viewers' choice categories were announced through the Hum Network website, which was followed by a period of public voting.

Winners are listed first, highlighted in boldface.

=== Television ===
Jury Choice Awards
**Best Drama Serial**: **Alif Allah Aur Insaan – Momina Duraid Productions**; Daldal – Momina Duraid Productions; Khamoshi – Momina Duraid Productions; Sammi – Momina Duraid Productions; O Rangreza – Moomal Entertainment; Yaqeen Ka Safar – Momina Duraid Productions
**Best Director Drama Serial**: **Ahson Talish – Alif Allah Aur Insaan**; **Kashif Nisar – O Rangreza**	**Best Writer Drama Serial**: **Qaisera Hayat – Alif Allah Aur Insaan**
**Best Actor**: **Adnan Siddiqui – Sammi** as Rashid; Ahad Raza Mir – Yaqeen Ka Safar as Dr. Asfandyar Ali Khan; Feroze Khan – Woh Aik Pal as Arish; Mikaal Zulfiqar – Alif Allah Aur Insaan as Shahzeb Shah; Noman Ejaz – O Rangreza as Khayam Sani; Zahid Ahmed – Daldal as Shuja	**Best Actress**: **Sajal Ali – O Rangreza as Sassi**; Ushna Shah – Alif Allah Aur Insaan as Raani; Sajal Ali – Yaqeen Ka Safar as Zubia; Kubra Khan – Alif Allah Aur Insaan as Nazneen; Mawra Hocane – Sammi as Sammi; Armeena Rana Khan – Daldal as Hira
**Best Supporting Actor**: **Imran Ashraf – Alif Allah Aur Insaan**; Ehteshamudin – Yaqeen Ka Safar; Bilal Khan – Sammi; Bilal Abbas – O Rangreza; Muneeb Butt – Daldal	**Best Supporting Actress**: **Sana Fakhar – Alif Allah Aur Insaan**; Hira Salman – Yaqeen Ka Safar; Nadia Afghan – Sammi; Saman Ashraf – Sammi; Kinza Hashmi – Daldal; Irsa Ghazal – O Rangreza
**Best Television Sensation Male**: **Ahad Raza Mir – Sammi and Yaqeen Ka Safar**	**Best Television Sensation Female**: **Hania Amir – Phir Wohi Mohabbat**
**Most Impactful Character**: **Qavi Khan – Alif Allah Aur Insaan**; **Sania Saeed – Sammi**; Shaz Khan — Yaqeen Ka Safar; Imran Ashraf — Alif Allah Aur Insaan; Noman Ijaz — O Rangreza	**Best Actor in a Negative Role**: **Ushna Shah – Alif Allah Aur Insaan**; Rehan Sheikh — Sammi; Alyy Khan — Woh Aik Pal; Asma Abbas — Daldal; Azfar Rehman — Nazr-e-Bad; Iqra Aziz — Khamoshi
**Best Onscreen Couple**: **Bilal Abbas Khan and Sajal Ali** – O Rangreza	**Best Television Film**: **Dildariyan – Momina Duraid Productions**
**Best Soap Series**: **Naseebon Jali – MD Productions**
**Best Soap Actor**: **Arslan Asad Butt – Naseebon Jali**	**Best Soap Actress**: **Hiba Bukhari – Thori Si Wafa**
**Excellence In Humanity Award**: **Musarrat Misbah**	**International Icon of the Year**: **Shahid Afridi**
**Recognition Awards**: **Mahira Khan**; **Humayun Saeed**
Viewers Choice Awards
**Best Drama Serial Popular**: **Yaqeen Ka Safar – Momina Duraid Productions**; Alif Allah Aur Insaan – Momina Duraid Productions; Daldal – Momina Duraid Productions; Khamoshi – Momina Duraid Productions; Sammi – Momina Duraid Productions; O Rangreza – Moomal Entertainment
**Best Actor Male Popular**: **Ahad Raza Mir – Yaqeen Ka Safar as Dr. Asfandyar Ali Khan**; Adnan Siddiqui – Sammi as Rashid; Feroze Khan – Woh Aik Pal as Arish; Mikaal Zulfiqar – Alif Allah Aur Insaan as Shahzeb Shah; Noman Ejaz – O Rangreza as Khayam Sani; Zahid Ahmed – Daldal as Shuja	**Best Actor Female Popular**: **Sajal Ali – Yaqeen Ka Safar as Dr. Zubia Khalil**; Kubra Khan – Alif Allah Aur Insaan as Nazneen Malik; Mawra Hocane – Sammi as Sammi Jutt; Armeena Rana Khan – Daldal as Hira; Sajal Ali – O Rangreza as Sassi; Ushna Shah – Alif Allah Aur Insaan as Reena Begum
**Best Onscreen Couple Popular**: **Ahad Raza Mir and Sajal Ali – Yaqeen Ka Safar**; Adnan Siddiqui and Saman Ansari – Sammi; Shahzad Sheikh and Kubra Khan – Alif Allah Aur Insaan; Imran Ashraf and Ushna Shah – Alif Allah Aur Insaan; Bilal Abbas Khan and Sajal Ali – O Rangreza; Ahmad Ali and Yumna Zaidi – Yeh Raha Dil	**Best Original Soundtrack Popular**: **"Surmaei Shaamon Se Mil Ke" from O Rangreza – Sahir Ali Bagga and Moomal Entertainment**; "Sab To Ucha Naam Hay Allah" from Alif Allah Aur Insaan – Naveed Nashad and Momina Duraid Productions; "Guman Ke Baad Yaqeen Ka Safar" from Yaqeen Ka Safar – Waqar Ali and Momina Duraid Productions; "Rabba Kithy Jawan Main" from Woh Aik Pal – Shuja Haider and Moomal Entertainment; "Yeh Raha Dil Han Mera Dil" from Yeh Raha Dil – Atif Ali and Momina Duraid Productions; "Kesi Hai Ye Khamoshi" from Khamoshi – Atif Ali and Momina Duraid Productions

=== Dramas with multiple awards ===
The following five dramas received multiple awards:

Awards	Drama
7	Alif Allah Aur Insaan
6	Yaqeen Ka Safar
4	O Rangreza
2	Sammi
