= Sajal Aly =

Pakistani actress (born 1994)

- Born: 17 January 1994 (age 32); Lahore, Punjab, Pakistan
- Occupation: Actress
- Years active: 2009–present
- Spouse: Ahad Raza Mir (m. 2020; div. 2022)
- Relatives: Saboor Aly (sister)
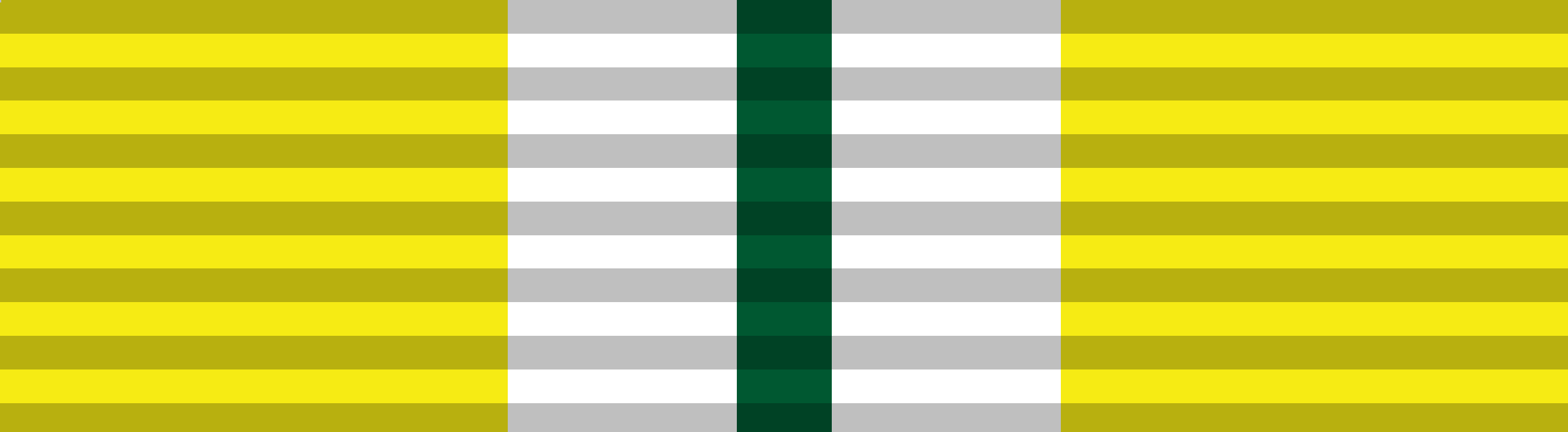
- Honours: Tamgha-e-Imtiaz

Sajal Ali (Urdu: سجل علی, born 17 January 1994) is a Pakistani actress and model who predominantly works in television and films. She has received five Hum Awards and a Lux Style Award out of thirteen nominations. She was honoured with Tamgha-e-Imtiaz by the government of Pakistan.

She began her career with Geo TV's sitcom Nadaaniyaan (2009) and later on appeared in leading role in soap opera Mehmoodabad Ki Malkain (2011). She took on to supporting roles in several television productions and had a breakthrough and critical success with the thriller Nanhi (2013) which earned her first nomination of Lux Style Award for Best TV Actress. Further praise came for her portrayals in the family dramatic Sannata (2013-14) and Khuda Dekh Raha Hai (2015) for which she received Best TV Actress nomination at the Lux Style Awards.

Aly since done some variety of work and is best known for her head strong portrayals of Dr. Zubiya Asfandyar in Yaqeen Ka Safar (2017), Sassi in O Rangreza (2017–18), Momina Sultan in Alif (2019), Rabia Safeer in Sinf-e-Aahan (2021) and Aaliya Agha in Kuch Ankahi (2023) all of which her performances were better received and the first two of these earned her the Hum Award for Best Actress Popular and Best Actress respectively.

== Early life and family ==
Aly was born on 17 January 1994 in Lahore, Pakistan. She has one sister Saboor Ali, who is also an actress.

== Career ==
=== Early work (2009–2012) ===
Aly made her first on-screen appearance with a recurring role in Geo Entertainment's sitcom Nadaaniyaan (2011). It was an episodic appearance followed by leading roles in several soap operas including, the melodrama Mehmoodabad Ki Malkain, the family Ahmed Habib Ki Betiyan and supporting roles in primetime political-drama Mastana Mahi, and the melodrama Meray Qatil Meray Dildar, the later of which earned her a nomination of Hum Award for Best Supporting Actress.

In 2012, she played the titular role in Express Entertainment's Chandni. The same year, she received praised for portraying a young outspoken college student in Fasih Bari Khan's written Mohabbat Jaye Bhar Mein She then appeared as naive poor Esha in Meri Ladli opposite Ahsan Khan, as carefree cancer patient Zoya in Fahim Burney's Sitamgar opposite Faisal Rehman, and as a girl nextdoor in Syed Ahmed Kamran's Mere Khuwabon Ka Diya opposite Danish Taimoor. Her next role was in Fasih Bari Khan's Quddusi Sahab Ki Bewah as an opportunistic tenant for few episodes.

=== Breakthrough and recognition (2013–2016) ===
In 2013, Aly received critical praise for her portrayal of an innocent teen child in Haseeb Hassan's directed Nanhi, The series was highly rated and earned her the nominations of Lux Style Award for Best TV Actress - Satellite and Pakistan Media Awards for Best Actress. Her next appearance was in Abdullah Kadwani and Asad Qureshi's Gohar-e-Nayab as the titular Gori, a young orphaned with exceptional spirit despite the mistreatment. The series earned her another nomination of Pakistan Media Award for Best TV Actress also. Her performance as a young troubled child in Asim Raza's Behadd alongside Nadia Jamil and Fawad Khan was praised by critics. The same year, she starred in Mohsin Mirza's directed Aasmanon Pay Likha alongside Sheheryar Munawar which turned out to be the highest rated television series of the year in Pakistan. Aly then portrayed a victim of split personality disorder in Kashif Nisar's directed Sannata alongside Danish Taimoor and Saba Qamar. Her performance brought her favourable reviews and a nomination of Lux Style Award for Best TV Actress.

In 2014, her roles in Barkat Siddiqui's directed Qudrat, Faiza Iftikhar's written Kahani Raima Aur Manahil Ki and Waseem Abbas's directed Ladoon Mein Pali were went unnoticed. However, the portrayal of a rape survivor in Yasir Nawaz's directed Chup Raho propelled her career. Despite the negative reviews that the series received due to the misleading depicting of the rape, her performance was praised, earning her third nomination as a Best TV Actress at 14th Lux Style Awards. This was followed by less well-received portrayals in A-Plus TV's Mera Raqeeb and Chupke Se Bahar Ajaye.

Her first role in 2015 was of submissive girl dominated by her mother's ideologies in Sabiha Sumar's directed Khuda Dekh Raha Hai, earned her another nomination of Lux Style Award for Best TV Actress. Later that year, she made her second on-screen appearance with Agha Ali after Khuda Dekh Raha Hai in Kashif Nisar's directed Kis Se Kahoon, where she portrayed a young college student who faces the hurdles there courageously. Her next role was in Siraj-ul-Haque's directed love-triangle Tum Mere Kya Ho as a young caretaker of a widower's daughter. Her portrayal of a women rights activist opposite Feroze Khan in the romance Gul e Rana earned her further praise. Despite mixed reviews, the series was highly rated like her previous collaboration with Khan, Chup Raho. For her performance she received her first ever award, Hum Award for Best Actress and a nomination of Best Actress at 15th Lux Style Awards. Aly then appeared in Anjum Shahzad's directed romance-drama Mera Yaar Miladay opposite Faysal Quraishi which couldn't get wider response.

=== Established actress and career fluctuations (2017–present) ===
In 2017, Aly appeared as a troubled and resilient medical student opposite Ahad Raza Mir in Farhat Ishtiaq's written Yaqeen Ka Safar which was based on Ishtiaq's novel Woh Yaqeen Ka Naya Safar. Her performance in the series is often ranked among one of her best and earned her Hum Award for Best Actress, Hum Award for Best Actress Popular and a nomination of Best Television Actress at the 17th Lux Style Awards. The same year, she made her Bollywood debut starring opposite Sridevi in Mom. The film emerged a box office success with Aly’s performance as a of victim of sexual assault unanimously receiving praise. Rahul Desai of Filmfare found Aly to be "great in maintaining the coldness of her character".

Aly made her playback singing debut in 2018 with the theme song of O Rangreza, in which she played the character of Sassi, a vibrant and rebellious daughter of a poet. She received praise for her performance and another nomination of Best TV Actress at the 17th Lux Style Awards. Her next role was of a university student who gets stiff in her decision of love in Sarmad Khoosat's directed Noor ul Ain, and was paired opposite Imran Abbas. Later that year, she appeared as Chammi in Khadija Mastoor's acclaimed novel Aangan's television adaptation with the same name which was directed by Mohammed Ehteshamuddin. She received critical praise for her performance with Dawn Images ranking it as one of the top 6 performances of television in 2019. After the series ended, a reviewer from The News International stated, "Sajal Aly stole the limelight and overshadowed everyone and everything else surrounding the recently concluded play". She received dual nominations as Best TV Actress - Viewers' choice and Best TV Actress - Critics' choice at the 19th Lux Style Awards.

In 2019, Aly was praised for her first role of the year of a struggling actress Momina Sultan in Geo Entertainment's spiritual romance Alif where she appeared opposite Hamza Ali Abbasi. The series earned her a nomination of Best TV Actress at the 20th Lux Style Awards. The little praise came from her portrayal of a university graduate with nightmare problems in Farhat Ishtiaq's written romantic thriller Yeh Dil Mera, which broadcast on Hum TV.

In 2021, she appeared in the first eight episodes of Ishq E Laa opposite Azaan Sami Khan as a fearless journalist. The same year, she returned to the silver screen as Zara in Nabeel Qureshi's directed historical-drama Khel Khel Mein opposite Bilal Abbas Khan. She won Best Film Actress for her performance in the film at the 21st Lux Style Awards.

Her first role in 2022 was of a female cadet from Pakistan Military Academy in Nadeem Baig's directed Sinf-e-Aahan alongside an ensemble female cast. The series earned her Best TV Actress - Critics' nomination at the 22nd Lux Style Awards. In 2023, she appeared as a hardworking real estate agent in Syed Mohammad Ahmed's written Kuch Ankahi in her second on-screen appearance with Bilal Abbas Khan. The same year, she made her English-language film debut with the British romantic comedy What's Love Got to Do with It? in a brief but pivotal role. It was produced by Jemima Khan and directed by Shekhar Kapur. Writing for Wionews Shomini Sen liked the movie and opined, "Aly delivers a restraint performance". The film earned $11.1 million.

== Media image ==
In 2021, she featured in Eastern Eye top 50 Asian Celebrity list ranked at seventh is the only Pakistani actress in top 10 and in 2023, she was ranked at seventeen. Aly is in the list of top 10 most followed Pakistani actress and has over 10 million followers on Instagram. In 2023, she has appeared in Eastern Eye's Top 30 under 30 Asians list ranked at sixteenth. She serves as a brand endorsement for several products such as Tecno, Veet and Realme.

== Personal life ==
Aly got engaged to actor Ahad Raza Mir in June 2019, and subsequently married in March 2020. In March 2022, the couple were legally divorced.

== Filmography ==
=== Films ===
Year	Title	Role	Director	Notes	Ref(s)
2016	Zindagi Kitni Haseen Hay	Maira Khan	Anjum Shahzad	Debut Film	
2017	Mom	Aarya Sabarwal	Ravi Udyawar	Hindi Film Debut	
2021	Khel Khel Mein	Zara	Nabeel Qureshi		
2023	What's Love Got to Do with It?	Maymouna	Shekhar Kapur	English Film Debut	
TBA	Alif Noon †	TBA	Faisal Qureshi	Unreleased	

=== Television ===
Year	Title	Role	Network	Notes	Ref(s)
2009	Nadaaniyaan	Sumbul	Geo Entertainment	Episodic Appearance	
2011	Mehmoodabad Ki Malkain	Afreen	ARY Digital		
2011	Mastana Mahi	Suhaai Adal Soomro	Hum TV		
2011	Meray Qatil Meray Dildar	Shifa	Hum TV		
2011	Meri Ladli	Esha	ARY Digital		
2011	Chandni	Chandni	Express Entertainment		
2011	Ahmed Habib Ki Betiyan	Nida	Hum TV		
2012	Mohabbat Jaye Bhar Mein	Neeli	Hum TV		
2012	Sitamgar	Zoya	Hum TV		
2012	Sasural Ke Rang Anokhay	Hadiqa	Hum TV		
2012	Mere Khuwabon Ka Diya	Raafia	Geo Entertainment		
2013	Quddusi Sahab Ki Bewah	Farzana	ARY Digital		
2013	Nanhi	Nanhi	Geo Entertainment		
2013	Kahani Aik Raat Ki	Recurring character	ARY Digital		
2013	Kitni Girhain Baqi Hain	Recurring character	Hum TV		
2013	Gohar-e-Nayab	Gohar (Gori)	A-Plus TV		
2013	Aasmanon Pay Likha	Qudsiya	Geo Entertainment		
2013	Sannata	Pari / Husna	ARY Digital		
2014	Qudrat	Mehwish	ARY Digital		
2014	Kahani Raima Aur Manahil Ki	Manahil	Hum TV		
2014	Ladoon Mein Pali	Bishma	Geo Entertainment		
2014	Chup Raho	Rameen	ARY Digital		
2014	Mera Raqeeb	Saba	A-Plus TV		
2014	Chupke Se Bahar Ajaye	Saira	A-Plus TV		
2015	Khuda Dekh Raha Hai	Zoya	A-Plus TV		
2015	Kis Se Kahoon	Hadiqa Qureshi	PTV Home		
2015	Tum Mere Kya Ho	Hina	PTV Home		
2015	Gul-e-Rana	Gul-e-Rana	Hum TV		
2016	Mera Yaar Miladay	Mushk	ARY Digital		
2017	Yaqeen Ka Safar	Dr. Zubiya Asfandyar Ali Khan	Hum TV		
2017	O Rangreza	Sassi	Hum TV		
2018	Noor ul Ain	Noor ul Ain	ARY Digital		
2018	Aangan	Chammi Zafar	Hum TV		
2019	Alif	Momina Sultan	Geo Entertainment		
2019	Yeh Dil Mera	Noor-ul-Ain Zaman	Hum TV		
2021	Ishq E Laa	Shanaya Azlan Ahmed	Hum TV		
2021	Sinf-e-Aahan	Rabia Safeer	ARY Digital		
2022	Team Muhafiz	Parinaaz	Geo Entertainment	Voice Role	
2023	Kuch Ankahi	Aaliya Agha	ARY Digital		
2024	Zard Patton Ka Bunn	Meenu	Hum TV		
2025	Dil Wali Gali Mein	Deeju	Hum TV	Ramadan Series	
2025	Main Manto Nahi Hoon	Mehmal Amritsari	ARY Digital		
2026	Zanjeerain	Rabia / Biya / Zarmala	Hum TV		

=== Telefilms ===
Year	Title	Role	Notes
2013	Behadd	Maha	

=== Web series ===
Year	Title	Role	Platform	Ref(s)
2021	Dhoop Ki Deewar	Sarah Sher Ali	ZEE5	
2026	The Pink Shirt	Sofia	ZEE5	

Awards and nominations
Award	Wins	Nominations
Hum Awards	7	18
Lux Style Awards	1	15

Totals (Note: Certain award groups do not simply award one winner. They acknowledge several different recipients, have runners-up, and have third place. Since this is a specific recognition and is different from losing an award, runner-up mentions are considered wins in this award tally. For simplification and to avoid errors, each award in this list has been presumed to have had a prior nomination.)
- Wins: 14
- Nominations: 49

== Awards and nominations ==
Year	Award	Category	Work	Result	Ref(s)
2013	1st Hum Awards	Best Supporting Actress	Mere Qatil Mere Dildar	Nominated	
2014	4th Pakistan Media Awards	Best Drama Actress	Gohar-e-Nayab	Won	
2014	4th Pakistan Media Awards	Best Drama Actress	Nanhi	Nominated	
2014	13th Lux Style Awards	Best Television Actress - Satellite	Nanhi	Nominated	
2015	14th Lux Style Awards	Best Television Actress	Sannata	Nominated	
2016	15th Lux Style Awards	Best Television Actress	Khuda Dekh Raha Hai	Nominated	
2017	47th Nigar Awards	Best Debut Female	Zindagi Kitni Haseen Hai	Nominated	
2017	3rd Galaxy Lollywood Awards	Best Female Debut	Zindagi Kitni Haseen Hai	Nominated	
2017	3rd Galaxy Lollywood Awards	Best On-screen Couple (with Feroze Khan)	Zindagi Kitni Haseen Hai	Won	
2017	3rd Galaxy Lollywood Awards	Best Actor in a Leading Role - Female	Zindagi Kitni Haseen Hai	Nominated	
2017	16th Lux Style Awards	Best Actress	Zindagi Kitni Haseen Hai	Nominated	
2017	16th Lux Style Awards	Best Television Actress	Gul-e-Rana	Nominated	
2017	5th Hum Awards	Best TV Actress - Jury	Gul-e-Rana	Won	
2017	5th Hum Awards	Best TV Actress - Popular	Gul-e-Rana	Nominated	
2017	5th Hum Awards	Best On-screen Couple - Jury (with Feroze Khan)	Gul-e-Rana	Nominated	
2017	5th Hum Awards	Best On-screen Couple - Popular (with Feroze Khan)	Gul-e-Rana	Nominated	
2018	ARY Digital Social Media Awards	Best Couple (with Imran Abbas)	Noor ul Ain	Nominated	
2018	2nd International Pakistan Prestige Awards	Best Actress TV (Viewer's Choice)	Yaqeen Ka Safar	Nominated	
2018	2nd International Pakistan Prestige Awards	Best Actress TV (Jury's Choice)	Yaqeen Ka Safar	Won	
2018	2nd International Pakistan Prestige Awards	Best Jodi of the year (with Ahad Raza Mir)	Yaqeen Ka Safar	Won	
2018	6th Hum Awards	Best Actress - Jury	Yaqeen Ka Safar	Nominated	
2018	6th Hum Awards	Best Actress - Popular	Yaqeen Ka Safar	Won	
2018	6th Hum Awards	Best On-screen Couple - Jury (with Ahad Raza Mir)	Yaqeen Ka Safar	Nominated	
2018	6th Hum Awards	Best On-screen Couple - Popular (with Ahad Raza Mir)	Yaqeen Ka Safar	Won	
2018	6th Hum Awards	Best Actress - Jury	O Rangreza	Won	
2018	6th Hum Awards	Best Actress - Popular	O Rangreza	Nominated	
2018	6th Hum Awards	Best On-screen Couple - Jury (with Bilal Abbas)	O Rangreza	Won	
2018	6th Hum Awards	Best On-screen Couple - Popular (with Bilal Abbas)	O Rangreza	Nominated	
2018	17th Lux Style Awards	Best Television Actress	O Rangreza	Nominated	
2018	17th Lux Style Awards	Best Television Actress	Yaqeen Ka Safar	Nominated	
2018	Zee Cine Awards	Best Actress in a Supporting Role (Jury's Choice Award)	Mom	Nominated	
2018	Bollywood Film Journalist Awards	Best Female Debut (Popular)	Mom	Nominated	
2020	1st Pakistan International Screen Awards	Best Actress	Aangan	Nominated	
2020	DIAFA Awards	International Icon Award	For contribution to Film and Television	Won	
2020	19th Lux Style Awards	Best TV Actress (Critics' Choice)	Aangan	Nominated	
2020	19th Lux Style Awards	Best TV Actress (Viewers' Choice)	Aangan	Nominated	
2020	1st Hum Social Media Awards	Most Popular Actor Female	—N/a	Won	
2020	1st Hum Social Media Awards	Most Popular On-Screen Couple (with Ahad Raza Mir)	—N/a	Won	
2020	1st Hum Social Media Awards	Most Popular Off-Screen Couple (with Ahad Raza Mir)	—N/a	Won	
2021	20th Lux Style Awards	Best TV Actress (Critics' Choice)	Alif	Nominated	
2021	20th Lux Style Awards	Best TV Actress (Viewers' Choice)	Alif	Nominated	
2021	20th Lux Style Awards	Best Original Soundtrack (with Naveed Nashad)	Yeh Dil Mera	Nominated	
2022	21st Lux Style Awards	Best Film Actress	Khel Khel Mein	Won	
2022	Filmfare Middle East Awards	Popular Face of Pakistani Cinema	—N/a	Won	
2023	22nd Lux Style Awards	Best TV Actress (Critics' Choice)	Sinf-e-Aahan	Nominated	
2024	9th Hum Awards	Most Impactful Character	Ishq E Laa	Nominated	
2024	1st Kya Drama Hai Icon Awards	Best Actress (Critics Choice)	Kuch Ankahi	Nominated	
2025	23rd Lux Style Awards	Best Television Actress (Viewers' Choice)	Kuch Ankahi	Nominated	
2025	10th Hum Awards	Global Star Award	—N/a	Nominated	
2025	10th Hum Awards	Best Actress - Jury	Zard Patton Ka Bunn	Won	
2025	10th Hum Awards	Best Actress - Popular	Zard Patton Ka Bunn	Won	
2025	10th Hum Awards	Best On-screen Couple - Jury (with Hamza Sohail)	Zard Patton Ka Bunn	Nominated	
2025	10th Hum Awards	Best On-screen Couple - Popular (with Hamza Sohail)	Zard Patton Ka Bunn	Nominated	
2025	2nd Kya Drama Hai Icon Awards	Best Actress (Critics’ Choice)	Zard Patton Ka Bunn	Won	
2025	2nd Kya Drama Hai Icon Awards	Best Actress (Popular Choice)	Zard Patton Ka Bunn	Nominated	
2025	24th Lux Style Awards	Actor of the Year - Female (Viewers’ choice)	Zard Patton Ka Bunn	Nominated	
2026	3rd Pakistan International Screen Awards	Best Actress - TV (Popular)	Zard Patton Ka Bunn	Pending	
2026	3rd Pakistan International Screen Awards	Best Actress - TV (Critics' Choice)	Zard Patton Ka Bunn	Pending	
2026	3rd Pakistan International Screen Awards	Best On-screen Couple (with Hamza Sohail)	Zard Patton Ka Bunn	Pending	
