= Rabia Butt =

Pakistani model and actress

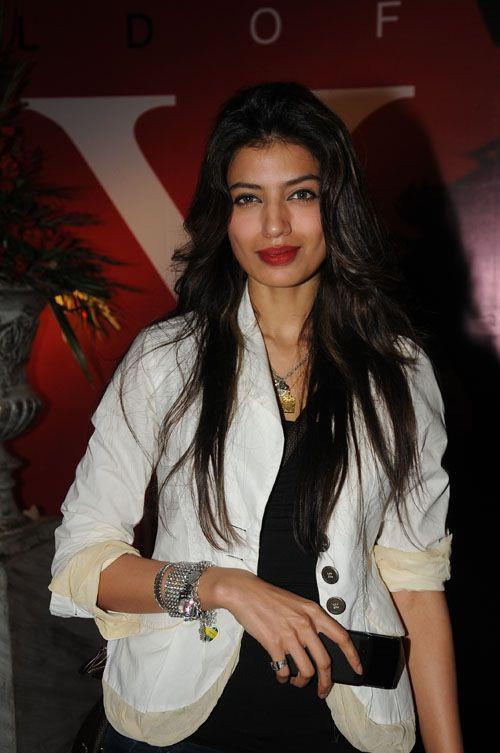
- Rabia Butt
- Born: Rabia Rashid; Lahore, Punjab, Pakistan
- Occupations: Model, Actress

Rabia Butt (born Rabia Rashid, 26 February 1990) is a Pakistani supermodel and actress. She has been the face of many leading brands in Pakistan, including Khaadi, Élan, and Sapphire. She has won two Lux Style Awards and a Bridal Couture Week award for her work in Pakistan's fashion industry. Later, she pursued a career in acting.

== Career ==
She filmed her debut feature film titled Hijrat (2016), directed by Farooq Mengal, opposite Asad Zaman. The film was released in 2016.

She appeared in several music videos such as Saaiyaan by Qurat-ul-Ain Balouch and Nakhun by Sajjad Ali.

In 2018, she made her television debut with the popular period drama Aangan which was based on Khadija Mastoor's novel of the same name, playing the role of a young Hindu widow. In 2019, she appeared in Farhat Ishtiaq's written romance-thriller Yeh Dil Mera alongside Adnan Siddiqui, Sajal Aly and Ahad Raza Mir. In 2020, she was featured in a leading role in the soap opera Soteli Maamta, directed by Meer Sikandar Ali. In 2021, she was praised for her role of a former tawaif and a caring stepmother in Anjum Shahzad's directed romance drama Pehli Si Muhabbat.

In 2023 she appeared as Inspector Sabiha in Adnan Sarwar's directed mystery-thriller Gunah. She then appeared as a modern gym instructor who settles in a small town in Kashif Nisar's directed social commentary Jeevan Nagar. She reprised this role in the series of the same name, a spin-off to Gunah.

== Filmography ==
=== Film ===
| Year | Film | Role | Notes |
|---|---|---|---|
| 2016 | Hijrat† | Jia | Released |

=== Television ===
| Year | Film | Role | Notes |
|---|---|---|---|
| 2018 | Aangan | Kussum | |
| 2019 | Yeh Dil Mera | Sahira | |
| 2020 | Soteli Maamta | Alizeh | |
| 2021 | Pehli Si Muhabbat | Nargis | |
| 2023 | Gunah | SHO Sabiha | |
| 2023 | Jeevan Nagar | Sitara (Munni) | |
| 2024 | Inspector Sabiha | Sabiha | |
