= Ahad Raza Mir =

Canadian actor (born 1993)

- احد رضا میر
- Born: 29 September 1993 (age 33); Karachi, Sindh, Pakistan
- Education: University of Calgary (BFA)
- Occupations: Actor; singer
- Years active: 2017–present
- Spouse: Sajal Aly (m. 2020; div. 2022)
- Father: Asif Raza Mir
- Relatives: Haroon Shahid (cousin)

Ahad Raza Mir (born 29 September 1993) is a Pakistani-Canadian actor and singer who primarily works in Urdu television series and films. The son of actor and producer Asif Raza Mir, Mir is the recipient of several accolades, including four Hum Awards and a Lux Style Award.

After graduating with a degree in bachelor of fine arts from University of Calgary, Mir worked as an actor in several theatre productions in Canada before made his acting debut with a supporting role in the Pakistani social-based TV drama Sammi (2017). He rose to prominence with the romantic drama Yaqeen Ka Safar, which proved to be his breakout role, earning him a Lux Style Award for Best Actor. The following year he starred in the commercially successful combat-war film Parwaaz Hai Junoon. His performances in the ISPR-based ensemble drama Ehd-e-Wafa, the thriller Yeh Dil Mera (both 2019) and the comedy Hum Tum (2022), earned him Lux Style Award for Best Actor nomination.

Mir has since starred in several international projects, such as the Indo-Pak conflict based web-series Dhoop Ki Deewar (2021), the American series Resident Evil (2022) and the British series World on Fire (2023).

== Early life and family ==
His grandfather Raza Mir was a director and his father Asif Raza Mir is an actor. Mir's mother Samra Raza Mir is a musician who was part of Pakistan's first female band, Symphony, formed in 1993. He has a younger brother, Adnan Raza Mir, who has launched his acting career in 2023 with the comedy drama Fairy Tale on Hum TV. Singer and actor Haroon Shahid is his cousin.

Mir attended Central Memorial High School’s Performing and Visual Arts Program in Calgary, Alberta, and graduated from the University of Calgary with a Bachelor of Fine Arts degree.

== Career ==
=== Beginnings and stage roles (2010–2016) ===
Mir started his career in 2010 at age 17, playing a brief role as the son of Sania Saeed and Faisal Rehman in the Hum TV's romantic drama Khamosiyan. Mir started his career on stage, performing, directing and writing in several musicals and plays across Canada. Mir wanted to move to Toronto, but instead decided to go back to Pakistan to work in films and television.

=== Yaqeen Ka Safar and rise to prominence (2017–present) ===
In 2017, Mir started auditioning for Hum TV's production house MD Productions, and was cast as a leading role in Yaqeen Ka Safar where he played Dr. Asfand Yaar, a grief-stricken brother alongside Sajal Aly and Hira Mani. He then had a supporting role in the social drama Sammi opposite Mawra Hocane. His performance earned him Lux Style Award for Best Actor, and won three Hum Awards including the Hum Award for Best Actor. Reviewing Yakeen Ka Safar, Sadaf Pervez of Express Tribune noted that Mir "shines" with his performance.

Coming from an influential film making family, Ahad was accused of nepotism. Responding to such claims Mir stated that he wanted "people to take [him], as an actor, very seriously" and that he is “here to give Pakistan some good cinema and TV”.

In 2018, Mir made his film debut with Haseeb Hassan's military-drama Parwaaz Hay Junoon, co-starring Hamza Ali Abbasi and Hania Aamir, which was released on Eid al-Adha. Mir replaced Osman Khalid Butt in a role of Flight Lieutenant Saad, who opted out due to his other commitments. The same year, Mir reunited with Sajal Aly and Mawra Hocane in Hum TV's Mohammed Ehteshamuddin-directed period drama Aangan where he played a poet, Jameel. The series was one of the most hyped dramas of 2018 but it has been a huge disappointment which in result was panned by audience.

In 2019, The Shakespeare Company, in a joint production with Vertigo Theatre in Canada, signed Mir to play Hamlet in their production becoming one of the first South Asian actor to play the role professionally in Canada. His performance won him the Betty Mitchell Award for Outstanding Performance by an Actor in a Drama.

In the same year, he played an army officer Saad Faraz in ISPR based Ehd-e-Wafa opposite Alizeh Shah. He then starred as Amaanullah Khan opposite Sajal Ali in suspense thriller Yeh Dil Mera. For both these performances, he received Lux Style Award for Best TV Actor - Critics nominations. Mir made his web debut co-starring Sajal Ali in Dhoop Ki Deewar as Vishal Malhotra. The series was released on ZEE5.

After a hiatus of three-years, Mir played a college chemistry student Adam Sultan in the 2022 Ramadan special Hum Tum, opposite Ramsha Khan. The series and his portrayal was praised across Pakistan. His chemistry with Khan was appreciated and they won the Hum Award for Best Onscreen Couple Popular and he received nomination for Hum Award for Best Actor Popular.

The same year, he made his Netflix debut with the series Resident Evil, as Arjun Batra. He next appeared in British series World on Fire, as Rajib Pal. Mir will next appear in Pakistan's first Netflix original Jo Bachay Hain Sang Samait Lo, which is expected to be released in late 2026.

In December 2024, Ahad played the lead role in Hum TV's Meem Se Mohabbat along with Dananeer Mobeen. Mir portrayed Talha Ahmed, a wealthy CEO and uncle to a young orphaned child. In 2026, Ahad played the lead role in Green Entertainment's Aik Mohabbat Aur along with Maya Ali.

== Other work ==
=== Music ===
In Canada, Mir has mostly been involved in musical theatre, being the first South Asian to win a "Best Actor in a Musical" award at the Canadian Critics’ Awards. He can play a number of musical instruments, including guitar, bass guitar, drums and keyboards. He has also learned to play the djembe, a West African drum.

In 2017, he played the guitar and sang for Yaqeen Ka Safar.

In 2018, Mir made his Coke Studio debut as a featured artist in its eleventh-season, where he performed the song "Ko Ko Korina" with Momina Mustehsan. Their rendition of the classic song was widely criticized. Within a few days of the video being released on YouTube, it became the most-disliked video in the music show's history.

=== Production ===
In 2018, Mir announced that he will be producing the film Kalasha, about the Kalash people, featuring actor Aijaz Aslam.

== Personal life ==
Mir obtained the Canadian citizenship in 2015. His hobbies include painting and learning languages.

On 6 June 2019, Mir got engaged to actress Sajal Aly, and married her in a private ceremony on 14 March 2020 in Abu Dhabi. The couple separated and eventually divorced on 22 March 2022.

== Public image and recorgnition ==
Images Dawn named Mir in their "Standout performances: Male" list of 2019. Mir has been placed in the Hello Pakistan's HOT100 list, in the "Trailblazers" category, in the year 2020 and 2022. The actor serves as an ambassador for a number of brands including Nestlé, Mountain Dew, Xiaomi, Coca-Cola and Lays, among others. In 2021, he was appointed the ambassador of the Pakistan Pavilion, at the Expo 2020 Dubai. Mir was placed at 42nd position in Eastern Eye's "Top 50 Global Asian Celebrities" list of 2023.

== Filmography ==
=== Films ===
Year	Title	Role	Director	Notes	Ref(s)
2018	Parwaaz Hai Junoon	Flying officer Saad Khan	Haseeb Hassan		
2027	Inspector Jamshed: The Secret Parchment	Behzaad	Fahad Noor		

=== Television ===
Year	Title	Role	Network	Director	Notes	Ref(s)
2010	Khamoshiyan	Wasif	Hum TV	Babar Javed	Cameo appearance	
2017	Sammi	Salaar	Hum TV	Saife Hassan		
2017	Yaqeen Ka Safar	Dr. Asfandyar "Asfi" Ali Khan	Hum TV	Shahzad Kashmiri		
2018	Aangan	Jameel Azhar	Hum TV	Mohammed Ehteshamuddin		
2019	Ehd-e-Wafa	Captain Saad Faraz	Hum TV	Saife Hassan		
2019	Yeh Dil Mera	Amaanullah Khan	Hum TV	Aehsun Talish		
2022	Hum Tum	Adam Sultan	Hum TV	Danish Nawaz		
2023	Fairy Tale	Himself	Hum TV	Ali Hassan	Special appearance	
2024	Meem Se Mohabbat	Talha Ahmed	Hum TV	Ali Hassan		
2026	Aik Mohabbat Aur	Haroon Malik	Green Entertainment	Farooq Rind		

=== Web series ===
Year	Title	Role	Network	Notes	Ref(s)
2021	Dhoop Ki Deewar	Vishal Malhotra	ZEE5	Indian co-production	
2022	Resident Evil	Arjun Batra	Netflix	American series	
2023	World on Fire	Rajib Pal	BBC One	British series	
2026	Jo Bachay Hain Sang Samait Lo	Sikandar Sheheryar	Netflix	Completed	

=== Theatre ===
Year	Production	Role	Theater	Notes
2014	West Side Story	Tony	U of C Operetta Company	
2014	A Picture with a Bull	Ruben	Common Ground Festival	
2014	The Tempest	Caliban	Theatre Calgary	
2014	Romeo and Juliet	Tybalt	The Shakespeare Company	
2014	Naughty But Nice	Victor	Forte Musical Theatre Guild	
2015	Macbeth	Lennox	The Shakespeare Company	
2015	Bengal Tiger at the Baghdad Zoo	Musa	Search Tower Company	
2019	Hamlet	Hamlet	The Shakespeare Company	
2023	Hamlet	Hamlet	Rose Theatre Brampton	

=== Other appearances ===
Year	Title	Role	Broadcast	Ref(s)
2018	"Hum Dekhenge"	Featured artist	Coke Studio	
2018	"Ko Ko Korina"	Featured artist	Coke Studio	
2024	9th Hum Awards	Host	Hum TV	
2026	3rd Sunday Special Icon Awards	Host		

== Awards and nominations ==
Year	Award	Category	Work	Result	Ref(s)
2016	Calgary Theatre Critics' Awards	Best Actor in a Musical	Naughty But Nice	Won	
2018	17th Lux Style Awards	Best Television Actor	Yaqeen Ka Safar	Won	
2018	2nd International Pakistan Prestige Awards	Best Emerging Talent of the Year	Yaqeen Ka Safar	Won	
2018	2nd International Pakistan Prestige Awards	Best Jori TV Serial (with Sajal Aly)	Yaqeen Ka Safar	Won	
2018	2nd International Pakistan Prestige Awards	Best Actor TV Serial - Viewer's Choice	Yaqeen Ka Safar	Nominated	
2018	6th Hum Awards	Best Television Sensation	Yaqeen Ka Safar	Won	
2018	6th Hum Awards	Best Actor - Jury	Yaqeen Ka Safar	Nominated	
2018	6th Hum Awards	Best Actor - Popular	Yaqeen Ka Safar	Won	
2018	6th Hum Awards	Best On-screen Couple - Popular (with Sajal Aly)	Yaqeen Ka Safar	Nominated	
2018	6th Hum Awards	Best On-screen Couple - Jury (with Sajal Aly)	Yaqeen Ka Safar	Won	
2019	Betty Mitchell Award	Outstanding Performance by an Actor in a Drama	Hamlet	Won	
2020	Pakistan International Screen Awards	Best Television Actor	Aangan	Nominated	
2020	Hum Style Awards	Most Stylish Film Actor	—N/a	Won	
2020	1st Hum Social Media Awards	Most Popular Actor Male	—N/a	Won	
2020	1st Hum Social Media Awards	Most Popular On-Screen Couple (with Sajal Aly)	—N/a	Won	
2020	1st Hum Social Media Awards	Most Popular Off-Screen Couple (with Sajal Aly)	—N/a	Won	
2021	20th Lux Style Awards	Best TV Actor (Viewers' Choice)	Yeh Dil Mera	Nominated	
2021	20th Lux Style Awards	Best TV Actor (Critics' Choice)	Yeh Dil Mera	Nominated	
2021	20th Lux Style Awards	Best TV Actor (Critics' Choice)	Ehd-e-Wafa	Nominated	
2021	20th Lux Style Awards	Best TV Actor (Viewers' Choice)	Ehd-e-Wafa	Nominated	
2024	9th Hum Awards	Best Actor	Hum Tum	Nominated	
2024	9th Hum Awards	Best On-screen Couple (with Ramsha Khan)	Hum Tum	Won	
2025	10th Hum Awards	Global Star Award Popular	—N/a	Nominated	
2026	3rd Sunday Special Icon Awards	Best Cover of the Year	—N/a	Won	
2026	3rd Sunday Special Icon Awards	Best Actor Male Of The Year	Meem Se Mohabbat	Won	
2026	3rd Sunday Special Icon Awards	Best Onscreen Couple Of The Year (with Dananeer Mobeen)	Meem Se Mohabbat	Won	
