= Dhoop Ki Deewar =

Pakistani drama web series

- Genre: Social; Tragedy
- Written by: Umera Ahmad
- Directed by: Haseeb Hassan
- Starring: Sajal Aly; Ahad Raza Mir
- Country of origin: Pakistan
- Original languages: Hindi; Urdu
- No. of seasons: 1
- No. of episodes: 16

Production
- Executive producers: Shailja Kejriwal, Misbah Shafique
- Producer: Haseeb Hassan
- Production locations: Azad Kashmir, Lahore, Karachi and Swat; Pakistan
- Camera setup: Multi-camera setup
- Running time: 25 minutes
- Production company: Motion Content Group

Original release
- Network: Zindagi
- Release: 25 June 2021

Dhoop Ki Deewar (transl. Wall Of Sunshine) is a ZEE5 exclusive and Zindagi-original Pakistani drama web series. It is written by Umera Ahmad and directed by Haseeb Hassan. The web series has an ensemble cast including Sajal Aly and Ahad Raza Mir in lead roles, while Zaib Rehman, Savera Nadeem, Samiya Mumtaz, Samina Ahmed, and Manzar Sehbai are in prominent roles. Set in the backdrop of the Indo-Pak conflict, the web series depicts how peace is better than war.

It is available for streaming on the OTT platform ZEE5 from 25 June 2021 with two episodes each Friday. The finale aired on the Independence Day weekend.

== Cast ==
=== Main ===
- Ahad Raza Mir as Vishal Malhotra
- Sajal Aly as Sarah Sher Ali

=== Recurring ===
- Samiya Mumtaz as Sunanda Malhotra : Vishal's mother, Vijay's wife
- Zaib Rehman as Shobha Malhotra : Vishal's grandmother, Vijay's mother
- Savera Nadeem as Amna Sher Ali : Sarah's mother, Sher's wife
- Samina Ahmed as Safia Nasir Ali : Sarah's grandmother, Nasir's wife, Sher's mother
- Annie Zaidi as Lubna Ansar : Junaid's mother
- Manzar Sehbai as Nasir Ali : Sarah's grandfather, Safia's husband, Sher's father
- Salma Hassan as Ayesha : Sarah's aunt
- Lubna Aslam as Rabia
- Alyy Khan as Vijay Malhotra : Vishal's father, Sunanda's husband, Shobha's son
- Raza Talish as Junaid Ansari : Lubna's son
- Adnan Jaffar as Sher Ali : Sarah's father, Amna's husband
- Paras Masroor as Anurag
- Zoya Nasir as Neha Sharma
- Zara Tareen as Pratibha
- Anoushey Rania Khan as Nooriah Sher Ali

== Production ==
=== Background and development ===
The web series was announced by Haseeb Hassan in mid-2019 with leading cast of Sajal Aly, Ahad Raza Mir, Samiya Mumtaz, Samina Ahmed, Savera Nadeem and Manzar Sehbai. In conservation with The News, Hassan revealed "Dhoop Ki Deewar is not a love story: it is a love-hate story based on the love-hate relationship between people of India and Pakistan." The official trailer was released by ZEE5 on YouTube on 15 June 2021.

=== Filming ===
Principal photography began in August 2019. The shooting was carried out in Azad Kashmir, Lahore, Karachi and Swat District.
