= Gunah (TV series) =

Pakistani television miniseries

- Urdu: گناہ
- Written by: Mohsin Ali
- Directed by: Adnan Sarwar
- Starring: Sarmad Khoosat; Saba Qamar; Rabia Butt; Juggan Kazim
- Country of origin: Pakistan
- Original language: Urdu
- No. of episodes: 6

Production
- Executive producers: Hina Aman; Kamran Afridi

Original release
- Network: Express Entertainment
- Release: 15 June – 20 July 2023

Related
- Inspector Sabiha

Gunah is a Pakistani television miniseries directed by Adnan Sarwar, and first aired on Express Entertainment on 15 June 2023. It stars Saba Qamar, Sarmad Khoosat, Rabia Butt and Juggan Kazim. The plot revolves around the events that unfold when Malik Hayat Khan's wife goes missing. It aired on Express Entertainment, from 15 June to 20 July 2023.

A prequel of the series Inspector Sabiha was aired on the same network from May 2024 to June 2024.

== Plot ==
In Malikabaad, everyone gossips about Gul Noor, the wife of Malik Hayat Khan that she has eloped with the tutor of her son, Ahmad. But Ahmad's mother is confident about her son and goes to police station to report the missing case of her son where the SHO first refuses to help her and then tells her about his transfer. SHO Sabiha then takes the charge of the police station and decides to help her upon learning of the incident.

== Cast ==
- Sarmad Khoosat as Malik Hayat Khan : Gul Noor's husband; Salman and Umer's father; Gul Meher's lover.
- Saba Qamar as Gul Meher aka Mehru : Gul Noor's sister; Hayat's lover.
- Rabia Butt as SHO Sabiha : Sameer's sister; Ayeza's mother.
- Juggan Kazim as Gul Noor Khan aka Noor : Hayat's wife; Salman and Umer's mother; Gul Meher's sister.
- Faiz Chauhan as ASI Nabi Baksh
- Ali Raza as Ahmad Ali Mir : Salman and Umer's tutor.
- Saima Saleem as Ahmad's mother
- Roohi Khan as Shaheen : Gul Noor and Gul Meher's mother
- Zafar Abbas as Gul Noor and Gul Meher's father; Shaheen's husband
- Fahad Hashmi as Raheem : Hayat's assistant.
- Usman Chaudhry as Dilawar
- Adnan Sarwar SHO Saleem (cameo)

== Reception ==
While reviewing the series after its finale, Express Tribune praised the art direction, music, and the chemistry of Khoosat and Qamar's characters, but panned the ending and termed it as rushed. A reviewer from The News International termed the characters as layered and complex, the script as crisp and gripping, and commended the several performances including Khoosat, Butt, Qamar and Hashmi.
