= Sonia Mishal =

Pakistani actress and model

- Born: Karachi, Sindh, Pakistan
- Occupation: Actress
- Years active: 2015–present

Sonia Mishal is a Pakistani television actress. She is known for her roles in the television serials, Ishqaaway (2015), Dumpukht - Aatish-e-Ishq (2016), O Rangreza (2017) and Khasara (2018).

== Early life ==
Born in Karachi, Pakistan, Mishal grew up in Doha, Qatar, and attended school there throughout her early years.

== Personal life ==
Mishal married Tallal Soofi in 2022. They welcomed a baby girl on 12 September 2024.

== Filmography ==
=== Television ===
Year	Drama	Role	Channel
2015	Ishqaaway	Amal	Geo TV
2015	Maikey Ko Dedo Sandes	Maryam	Geo TV
2015	Sangat	Salma	Hum TV
2016	Khwab Saraye	Sania	Hum TV
2016	Izn-e-Rukhsat	Sundus	Geo TV
2016	Dumpukht - Aatish-e-Ishq	Kulsoom	A-Plus TV
2016	Meher Aur Meherban	Unaiza	Urdu 1
2016	Piya Bedardi	Eshal Sahir	A-Plus TV
2016	Mera Kya Qasoor Tha	Shaista	Geo TV
2017	Farz	Aliya	PTV Home
2017	Shikwa Nahi Kisi Se	Nimra	A-Plus TV
2017	O Rangreza	Amna	Hum TV
2017	Faisla	Maryam	ARY Digital
2018	Khasara	Sila	ARY Digital
2018	Ro Raha Hai Dil	Zoya	TV One
2018	Tu Ishq Hai	Nazia (Nazo)	Hum TV
2019	GT Road	Nageena	A Plus TV
2019	Bin Badal Barsat		Express Entertainment
2021	Neeli Zinda Hai	Sumbul	ARY Digital
2021	Sinf-e-Aahan	Kiran	ARY Digital
2022	Meri Shehzadi	Cam	Hum TV
2023	Rafta Rafta		AUR Life
2024	Pagal Khana		Green tv
