= Khuda Dekh Raha Hai =

Pakistani television series

- Written by: Shahzad Javed; Afifa Muhammad
- Directed by: Sabiha Sumar
- Starring: Sajal Aly; Agha Ali; Bushra Ansari; Qazi Wajid; Imran Aslam; Asad Siddiqui
- Country of origin: Pakistan
- Original language: Urdu
- No. of episodes: 20

Production
- Producer: Sadia Jabbar
- Running time: 30–45 minutes
- Production company: Alpha Productions

Original release
- Network: A-Plus Entertainment
- Release: 19 February – 2 July 2015

Khuda Dekh Raha Hai (Urdu: خدا دیکھ رہا ہے, lit. 'God is watching') is a Pakistani television drama series directed by Sabiha Sumar of Khamosh Pani fame and produced by Sadia Jabbar. It is written by Shahzad Javed and Afifa Muhammad. The series stars Sajal Aly and Agha Ali in the lead roles along with Bushra Ansari, Imran Aslam and Asad Siddiqui in supporting roles. The 20-episode serial originally aired on A-Plus Entertainment from February 19 to July 2, 2015.

At the 15th Lux Style Awards, it received two nominations including, Best TV Actress for Aly and Best TV Director for Sumar.

== Plot summary ==
The show highlights the people's lives in the garb of religion. Khalida, a pious yet extremist in her values, brings up her children according to her own religious boundaries and offers Istikhara for the people who come to her. Her teachings are challenged by her daughter Zoya who when she expresses her wish to marry Junaid, her boyfriend and a singer by profession. Despite knowing her wish, Khalida gets her married to Adnan, an uncaring and alcoholic person. After her marriage, Zoya faces betrayal and tries to cope with issues.

== Cast ==
- Sajal Aly as Zoya
- Agha Ali as Junaid
- Bushra Ansari as Khalida
- Imran Aslam as Adnan
- Qazi Wajid as Akhtar
- Asad Siddiqui as Moiz
- Faryal Mehmood as Sana
- Mehmood Akhtar as Mujeeb ur Rehman
- Sana Askari as Sanam
- Parveen Akbar as Sanam's mother
- Qaiser Naqvi as Aapa Jan
- Pareeza Hashmi

== Production ==
Earlier, the show was titled as Istikhara (استخارہ) but later it was changed to Khuda Dekh Raha Hai.

Apart from acting, Agha also sang the OST of the serial. It was the second on-screen appearance of Sajal Aly and Agha Ali after the drama serial Kis Se Kahoon.

== Broadcast ==
- In 2015, the show was rebroadcast in Pakistan on ATV (Pakistan) under the title Amal(عمل).
- It premiered again on A-Plus Entertainment on 30 January 2017 at 10:00 pm slot.
- It aired on B4U PLUS of B4U Network in India and the Middle East with the same title.

== Awards ==
The drama received two nominations at 15th Lux Style Awards.

Award	Category	Recipient(s) and nominee(s)	Result	Ref(s)
Lux Style Awards	Best Television Director	Sabiha Sumar	Nominated	
Lux Style Awards	Best Television Actress	Sajal Aly	Nominated	
