= Aqdas Waseem =

Pakistani actor

- Born: Lahore, Pakistan
- Citizenship: Pakistan
- Years active: 2014-present
- Notable work: Jamal in Miss Fire

Aqdas Waseem is a Pakistani actor. He is widely and most popularly known for his character "Jamal" in Miss Fire.

== Filmography ==
Key
†	Denotes film / drama that has not released yet

=== Filmography ===
Year	Title	Role	Notes	Ref
2023	Money Back Guarantee	TBA	Support Role	

=== Television ===
Year	Title	Role	Channel
2013	Miss Fire	Jamal	Geo Entertainment
2014	Kis Se Kahoon	Akbar	PTV Home
2015	Sasural Meri Behen Ka		Geo Entertainment
2017	Begangi		A-Plus TV
2020	Ye Laga Sixer	Azeem	Play Entertainment
