= Aik Mohabbat Aur =

2026 Pakistani television series

- ایک محبت اور
- Genre: Romance; Drama
- Written by: Faiza Iftikhar
- Directed by: Farooq Rind
- Starring: Ahad Raza Mir; Maya Ali; Hajra Yamin; Sachal Afzal
- Country of origin: Pakistan
- Original language: Urdu
- No. of episodes: 24

Production
- Producer: Tehreem Chaudhary
- Production locations: Islamabad, Pakistan
- Camera setup: Multi-camera setup
- Running time: 35 minutes
- Production company: Multiverse Entertainment

Original release
- Network: Green Entertainment
- Release: June 8 – August 25, 2026

Aik Mohabbat Aur (transl. One More Love; Urdu: ایک محبت اور) is a 2026 Pakistani romantic drama television series written by Faiza Iftikhar and directed by Farooq Rind. It stars Maya Ali and Ahad Raza Mir as leads. It premiered on 8 June 2026 on Green Entertainment.

The story follows Haroon Malik, a journalist, and Khushbakht Naaz, a assistant commissioner, whose relationship develops from misunderstandings into love and marriage. Their journey faces family conflicts, jealousy, betrayal and dangerous conspiracies.

== Plot ==
Haroon refuses his mother's repeated efforts to get him married. After changing Khushbakht's words in a news report and leaving her to face the consequences, Haroon receives an angry call from her. During the call, she hears someone attacking him. Haroon exaggerates the details of his attack to get better ratings. Khushbakht visits him in the hospital but finds him enjoying himself. Haseeb taunts Khushbakht for rejecting him and insults his own wife. Meanwhile, Khushbakht remembers the painful events of her past. Naveed questions Haroon about his interest in Khushbakht, while Faris blames him for problems in his marriage. Khushbakht stands against a male employee's sexist comments and agrees to appear on Haroon's special Women's Day show, but later regrets her decision. During Haroon's show, Chaudhary personally insults Khushbakht, making Haroon furious. At home, Khushbakht is blamed for being a bad influence. Seema starts suspecting Haseeb of having an affair, while Maham asks Haroon for help against Faris's abusive behaviour. Khushbakht tries to ignore the incidents that happened during the interview, but her boss orders her to remove the footage. Haroon sees Faris verbally abusing Maham. Meanwhile, Khushbakht is surprised when she overhears Haroon showing a different side of his personality. Khushbakht encourages Haseeb to spend more time with Seema. Haroon has a personal conversation with Maham and learns the painful truth about how his brother Faris has been abusing her. Haroon stands up for Maham and decides to spend more time with Khushbakht. He slowly starts accepting his feelings for her, while Khushbakht also begins enjoying his attention. However, Haroon's past comes back when he meets someone he once loved. Seema encourages Khushbakht to find out what Haseeb is hiding. Maham refuses to return home with Faris because of his continued emotional abuse. Haroon meets Pari for the first time, while Seema discovers what has been keeping Haseeb busy. Saira notices Khushbakht's changed and happier behaviour and teases her about it. Haroon defends Khushbakht against Sonia's accusations. Faris blames Haroon for Maham's behaviour, while Khushbakht's mother rejects Seema's accusations. Meanwhile, Haroon tells his parents about his feelings for Khushbakht. Haroon asks his parents to help him win her heart, while Khushbakht gets angry at Haseeb for assuming that they still have a future together. Haroon proposes to Khushbakht, leaving her surprised. Maham returns home, but Faris questions her reasons for coming back.

Haroon is surprised when Khushbakht accepts his marriage proposal. Although both mothers have some concerns, the family meeting goes well and the marriage arrangements move forward. However, as the wedding preparations begin, a suggestion about Khushbakht's future upsets her. Sonia is shocked to learn about Haroon's engagement. Haroon offers to look after Pari while Khushbakht goes out of town for training after their marriage. Meanwhile, Haseeb becomes furious after receiving Khushbakht's wedding invitation and tries to ruin their relationship. Despite Haseeb and Sonia's attempts to create problems, Haroon and Khushbakht's wedding and reception go smoothly. As they begin their married life, Khushbakht finds it difficult to adjust to sharing her and her daughter's lives with a new person. With Khushbakht away for training and keeping her distance, Haroon becomes fully responsible for looking after Pari. Khushbakht gets upset when she calls home and finds out that Sonia is visiting Haroon. Haroon tries to clear her doubts, but his explanations fail to satisfy her. As Khushbakht continues doubting Haroon's loyalty, he reminds her that he is not like Haseeb. His comparison makes her worried, so she tries to find out the truth. Eventually, she learns that Haseeb had confronted Haroon before their wedding. Khushbakht regrets her behaviour towards Haroon. However, when she hears about a tragedy during his work assignment, she fears that she may never get another chance to make things right. She rushes to the hospital to see him but discovers that Sonia has already arrived. Haroon's father witnesses Faris abusing Maham. Despite being told to stay within her limits, Sonia makes an effort to protect Khushbakht's reputation. Meanwhile, Haroon slowly starts winning Khushbakht's trust and breaking down her emotional walls. Haroon and Sonia make a plan to save Khushbakht from being framed by Chaudhary. As Faris becomes increasingly unstable while trying to stop Maham from leaving, Khushbakht supports her. Haroon takes Khushbakht away to protect her from the consequences of Chaudhary's plan. Haroon ignores warnings about Chaudhary, while Khushbakht discovers his secret project with Sonia and starts suspecting him of betraying her. When Haroon is framed for a politician's death, she realises her mistake. His parents also become worried about his safety.

Haroon goes on air to expose Chaudhary. Khushbakht discovers that Haroon's real intention was to protect her and her honour, making her regret the way she treated him. When Haroon returns home, he insists that she arrest him. Faris publicly speaks against Haroon in front of journalists without showing any regret. Khushbakht's boss supports both her and Haroon. Meanwhile, Chaudhary visits Haroon in prison and uses the meeting to threaten him again. Chaudhary pressures Haroon to turn against Khushbakht, while Haseeb tries to convince her that Haroon has betrayed her. As Chaudhary becomes desperate to save himself, he takes his plan further and threatens the lives of Khushbakht and Pari. Fearing for her and Pari's lives, Khushbakht feels helpless and is forced to accept Chaudhary's demands. Haroon returns home and is shocked to discover what she has done. He also learns about the difficult circumstances that forced her to make this decision. Haroon, Nabeel and Sonia then join forces to stop Khushbakht from accepting Chaudhary's demands. After Chaudhary is exposed in public, Khushbakht's honour is protected, Haroon's name is cleared, and their marriage becomes even stronger.

== Cast ==
- Ahad Raza Mir as Haroon Malik
- Maya Ali as Khushbakht Naz
- Hajra Yamin as Sonia Murtuza
- Omair Rana
- Noor Hassan as Haroon's father
- Yousuf Bashir Qureshi as Khushbakht's father
- Samiya Mumtaz as Khushbakht's mother
- Munazzah Arif as Haroon's mother
- Shamil Khan
- Sachal Afzal as Haseeb
- Hani Taha as Seema
- Saqib Sumeer
- Dodi Khan as Khushbakht's former husband

== Production ==
In July 2025, the details of the series were first reported. Along with Mitti De Baaway, the series was another signature line-up of Green Entertainment for the 2026 television season. It marked Faiza Iftikhar's sixth project featuring Maya Ali as the lead, previously acted in Iftikhar's Aik Nayee Cinderella, Aunn Zara, Khoya Khoya Chand, Meri Zindagi Hai Tu and Pehli Si Muhabbat. The first look of the series was revealed by late April 2026.

== Reception ==
Gaitee Ara Siddiqi of The News International praised Aik Mohabbat Aur for portraying a strong, independent female protagonist and for addressing important social issues such as domestic violence, emotional abuse, and the stigma surrounding divorce.

In a similar review, Dr Amber Javed Malik of the DAWN Images praised for its light, feel-good romance, balanced portrayal of social issues such as divorce, single parenthood and therapy, and its contemporary story featuring a strong, career-driven female lead.
