= Nanhi =

Pakistani TV series (2013)

- Opening screen
- Genre: Thriller; Drama; Social
- Written by: Mona Haseeb
- Directed by: Haseeb Hassan
- Starring: Sajal Ali; Shahood Alvi; Asma Abbas; Javaid Sheikh
- Opening theme: Choti Si Nanhi Si performed by Alycia Dias
- Country of origin: Pakistan
- Original language: Urdu
- No. of episodes: 17

Production
- Executive producer: Mona Haseeb
- Producer: Iqbal Ansari
- Production location: Karachi, Pakistan
- Running time: approx. 35-45 minutes

Original release
- Network: Geo Entertainment
- Release: 11 March – 1 July 2013

Nanhi (Urdu: ننھی, lit. 'Little One') is a 2013 Pakistani thriller drama serial directed by Haseeb Hassan aired on Geo Entertainment in 2013. The serial is written by Mona Haseeb and produced by Iqbal Ansari. It focuses on the issues of Pakistani society, such as child trafficking and education of young girls. It stars Sajal Ali, Shahood Alvi, Asma Abbas and Javaid Sheikh.

The most popular serial of that time with the highest TRP of 6.5, lifted Geo TV's perception among local and international audiences. It received nominations for all major categories at the 13th Lux Style Awards, including Best TV Play, Best TV Actress, Best TV Writer, and Best TV Director and won for Best TV Director. At 4th Pakistan Media Awards, it received two nominations that includes, Best Drama Actress for Aly and Best Supporting Actor for Sheikh.

== Plot ==
It is the story of Nanhi (Sajal Ali), raised by her aunt Shammo (Asma Abbas). Shammo is a professional nurse at a hospital and kidnaps babies from the hospital. Nanhi was also kidnapped by Shammo; Nanhi always thought Shammo was her mother. Nanhi was always against Shammo for kidnapping and selling babies since she loved babies and wanted one of her own. A series of events leads her to have a baby herself, and then the conflict arises.

Nanhi had to look after kidnapped babies from the age of four or five years by her so-called mother, Shammo. She makes Nanhi look after the babies until she can sell them off for a good bargain. The nurse, guard of the civil hospital, and the local policeman are in connivance. Nanhi starts loving children and looks forward to having one of her own. She chides Shammo from time to time for kidnapping babies.

Nanhi has a childhood friend called Chanda (Anoushay Abbasi). Together they play pranks in their locality. Both of them also visit their neighbour, Zaman's house. Zaman's wife has just delivered a baby girl. Zaman (Shahood Alvi) despises his wife for being fat and ugly and giving birth to a daughter. Eventually, Zaman has an affair with Chanda. In the locality, there is an aged man, Alladino. He is a primary school teacher. Also, there is a young man, Shahid (Shahroz Sabzwari), who loves Nanhi. Nanhi grows to about fifteen-sixteen years old (same as Chanda) but is still a child at heart and in behaviour.

One day, Shammo brings a stolen baby boy. Nanhi grows very attached to him, but the baby suffocates and dies while attempting to hide it during a raid on Shammo's house by the Police. Nanhi is devastated. She brings Zaman's daughter to her house without anyone's knowledge. Zaman and his wife search the whole locality and eventually find their girl. Zaman is very angry with Nanhi for this and sexually assaults her in her house when Shammo is not there. Nanhi is oblivious to this rape and is happy that she will have a baby, as Zaman had told her. After a few days, when Nanhi does not get a baby, she throws a stone at Zaman. Chanda and Zaman's wife are both angry with Nanhi for doing this.

Zaman's wife creates chaos at Chanda's home for having an affair with her husband. Chanda's widowed mother scolds her but in vain. Zaman's wife also tells Nanhi not to visit her home as she, too, may have an affair with her husband. Zaman and Chanda, without anyone's knowledge, take Nanhi to a vacant house and beat her mercilessly for throwing a stone at Zaman. Zaman also threatens her not to tell anyone about the rape. They are just about to throw her off a balcony when Shahid, who was playing cricket in a nearby alley, sees them taking Nanhi and follows them. He saves Nanhi. Nanhi runs to her building, where an angry Zaman's wife tries to strangle her. Shahid rescues Nanhi again. Nanhi is hysterical and runs to Alladino's house. Shahid is unaware of this. Sometime before, Shahid is engaged to Nanhi.

Alladino takes care of Nanhi. She says she does not want to go home as her mother hates her, and Chanda and Zaman are after her life. He quietly takes her to his native house, where Alladino's physically challenged and sick first wife mistakes Nanhi to be his wife and eventually marries them both. Shahid tells Shammo how Zaman, his wife and Chanda have been cruel to Nanhi. With the help of a local policeman, Shammo puts all of them behind bars. Meanwhile, two reporters are digging into the matter of child kidnapping and start suspecting Shammo and are on her trail.

Zaman and Chanda get married when they come out of jail. Zaman's wife becomes a servant in her own house. Nanhi is pregnant with Alladino's child. Alladino brings her back to the city to Shammo's house. Shammo does not know they are married and tries to marry her to Shahid. Nanhi tells him that she is married and cannot marry him. Shammo is very angry at learning this. Zaman and Chanda also taunt loudly in the locality about Nanhi's character. In the end, Shammo gets arrested for child kidnapping. Nanhi and Alladino appear on the news channel to recount her story. After six months, Nanhi gives birth to a baby girl and is happy with Alladino.

== Cast ==
- Sajal Ali as Nanhi
- Shahood Alvi as Zaman
- Asma Abbas as Shammo Tai
- Javed Sheikh as Allaudino
- Anoushay Abbasi as Chanda; Nanhi's friend
- Shehroz Sabzwari as Shahid
- Azra Mohyeddin as Tai Ammi
- Shamoon Abbasi
- Rashid Farooqi
- Mishi Khan
- Uroosa Siddiqui
- Mona Alam
- Osama Ghazi
- Shehryar Zaidi

== International broadcast ==
Nanhi aired in India on Zindagi from 14 January 2016 to 2 February 2016 with the same title, and in 2020 it was made available on Zee5 to stream online across 190 countries.

== Critical reception ==
Mehreen Hasan of The News International praised the series for its original and innovative storyline, tackling sensitive social issues like child kidnappings and police inefficiency, and commended the writer, Mona Haseeb, the director, Haseeb Hasan, and the cast for their work.

== Awards and nominations ==
Date of ceremony	Award	Category	Recipient(s)	Result	Ref.
4 December 2014	Lux Style Awards	Best Television Director	Haseeb Hassan	Won	
4 December 2014	Lux Style Awards	Best Television Serial -Satellite	Nanhi	Nominated	
4 December 2014	Lux Style Awards	Best Television Actress	Sajal Ali	Nominated	
4 December 2014	Lux Style Awards	Best Television Writer	Mona Haseeb	Nominated	
28 December 2013	Pakistan Media Awards	Best Drama Actress	Sajal Ali	Nominated	
28 December 2013	Pakistan Media Awards	Best Supporting Actor	Javed Shaikh	Nominated	
