= Yeh Dil Mera =

2019 Pakistani television series

- Title Card
- یہ دل میرا
- Genre: Drama; Romance; Psychological Thriller
- Written by: Farhat Ishtiaq
- Directed by: Aehsun Talish
- Starring: Ahad Raza Mir; Sajal Ali; Adnan Siddiqui; Zarnish Khan; Mira Sethi; (entire cast)
- Opening theme: Yeh Dil Mera by Shiraz Uppal
- Ending theme: Yeh Dil Mera by Shiraz Uppal
- Composer: (See below)
- Country of origin: Pakistan
- Original language: Urdu
- No. of seasons: 1
- No. of episodes: 33

Production
- Executive producer: Momina Duraid
- Producer: Momina Duraid
- Production locations: Shogran and Islamabad, Pakistan
- Camera setup: Multiple-camera setup
- Running time: 36-38 minutes
- Production company: MD Productions

Original release
- Network: Hum TV
- Release: 30 October 2019 – 10 June 2020

Yeh Dil Mera (Urdu: یہ دل میرا, lit. 'This heart of mine') is a 2019 Pakistani romantic thriller television series that premiered on Hum TV on 30 October 2019. It is directed by Aehsun Talish, written by Farhat Ishtiaq and produced by Momina Duraid under their banner MD Productions. The serial stars Ahad Raza Mir, Sajal Ali and Adnan Siddiqui in lead roles.

The series highlights mental health issues in both the lead characters of Noor ul Ain and Amaan Ullah respectively, Sajal Ali and Ahad.

The series received mostly positive reviews, with critics praising its plot, acting performances, and chemistry of the lead couple, but was critical of the pacing issues and poor direction.

== Plot ==
Noor-ul-Ain Zaman, known as **Aina** (Sajal Aly), is the only daughter of influential businessman **Mir Farooq Zaman** (Adnan Siddiqui). Haunted by recurring nightmares and frequent panic attacks, Aina seeks treatment from psychiatrist **Dr. Arsalan**, but her condition does not improve. After losing her mother, **Neelofer**, in childhood, she is raised by her caretaker, **Nargis Bua**.

At the wedding of Saqib, the son of Farooq's close friend Ghauri, Aina meets the mysterious and charismatic **Amaanullah Khan (Amaan)** (Ahad Raza Mir). Although they have never met as adults, Amaan knows intimate details about Aina's life and past. While Aina interns at Amaan's company, the two grow close, and Amaan eventually proposes marriage. Meanwhile, it is revealed that Farooq has secretly kept a second wife, **Sahira**, hidden from the world.

Behind Amaan's affection lies a hidden motive. Years earlier, Farooq murdered Amaan's parents, **Humaira** and **Ubaidullah**, along with his sister. Determined to avenge his family's deaths, Amaan uses Ghauri's family to gain access to Farooq and Aina. He also joins forces with Sahira, who has long suffered abuse at Farooq's hands and wishes to expose his secret marriage and bring him to justice.

Amaan unexpectedly calls off the wedding and leaves for the UK, only to return later and marry Aina after she pleads with him. During the wedding festivities, Aina's maternal aunt **Farhana** arrives and becomes suspicious about Neelofer's death after Amaan questions her. She begins investigating the truth.

After the marriage, Amaan becomes distant and hostile toward Aina, straining their relationship. Although they eventually reconcile, they travel to **Daryabagh** for their honeymoon, where unsettling events begin to unfold.

Daryabagh holds painful memories from the past. As children, Amaan and Aina first met there. Their mothers, Humaira and Neelofer, were close friends. Farooq, who had been Humaira's college classmate, had once proposed to her, but she rejected him and married Ubaidullah. Obsessed with Humaira, Farooq repeatedly pursued her and eventually attempted to assault her. When she resisted, Farooq, aided by his loyal assistant **Ali Baksh**, murdered Humaira, Ubaidullah, and their daughter while they were on a family outing. Young Amaan survived the attack and was secretly sent to London by his family servant, **Abdul Rehman**, to live with his uncle **Abdullah**.

During the honeymoon in Daryabagh, Aina experiences disturbing hallucinations, hears mysterious voices, and begins seeing strange figures, leading her to believe the place is haunted or hiding a dark secret. Amaan dismisses her fears as delusions. At the same time, Farooq orders Ali Baksh to murder Sahira after suspecting that she has betrayed him.

After returning home, Amaan's increasingly suspicious behavior prompts Aina to investigate his past. He finally reveals the truth—that Farooq murdered his family and that his marriage to Aina was part of his plan for revenge. Shocked and heartbroken, Aina refuses to believe the accusations against her father and struggles to accept that Amaan manipulated her for his own purpose. Although their marriage becomes strained, they continue living together. Aina resolves to prove Farooq's innocence, while Farooq discovers that Amaan is the son of the family he destroyed.

Amaan and Aina return to Daryabagh, each driven by different goals—Amaan seeks revenge, while Aina searches for evidence to clear her father's name. As Aina investigates her family's old summer house, suppressed childhood memories resurface. She finally discovers the horrifying truth: Neelofer had learned about Farooq's attempted assault on Humaira and his murder of Amaan's family. While trying to escape with young Aina, Neelofer was murdered by Ali Baksh on Farooq's orders.

Meanwhile, Farhana and Nargis Bua arrive in Daryabagh after learning the truth. Farooq and Ali Baksh also reach the estate after Amaan reveals his identity and location. In a tense confrontation, Aina points a gun at herself and forces Farooq to confess all his crimes. Overcome with guilt, Farooq orders Ali Baksh to shoot him. After killing Farooq, Ali Baksh takes his own life.

One month later, Aina separates from Amaan without divorcing him. She closes her father's business empire and uses its wealth to establish a school for underprivileged children in Daryabagh. Amaan dedicates his life to serving an orphanage, burdened by remorse for the pain he caused. Although he sincerely regrets his actions, Aina cannot forgive him. They part ways, still deeply in love but unable to reunite. The story ends with both longing for each other, carrying the weight of love, loss, and loneliness.

== Cast ==
=== Main ===
- Ahad Raza Mir as Amaanullah Khan aka Amaan : Ubaidullah and Humaira's son; Aisha's brother; Aina's husband.
- Sajal Ali as Noor-ul-Ain Zaman aka Aina : Farooq and Neelofer's daughter; Amaan's wife.
- Adnan Siddiqui as Mir Farooq Zaman : Aina's father; Neelofer and Sahira's widower. (Dead)

=== Recurring ===
- Paras Masroor as Ali Bakhsh : Farooq's assistant. (Dead)
- Zarnish Khan as Humaira Ubaidullah : Ubaidullah's wife Amaan and Aisha's mother. (Dead)
- Mira Sethi as Neelofer Farooq : Farooq's wife; Aina's mother; Farhana's sister. (Dead)
- Farhan Ali Agha as Zahid Ghauri : Mehtab husband; Asiya and Saqib's father; Farooq and Amaan's friend.
- Mariam Mirza as Mehtab Ghauri : Zahid's wife; Asiya and Saqib's mother.
- Amra Kazi as Asiya Ghauri : Zahid and Mehtab's daughter; Saqib's sister.
- Rabia Butt as Sahira Arif : Farooq's third wife; Aina's step mother. (Dead)
- Natasha Hussain as Farhana Ahsan : Neelofer's sister; Ahsan's wife; Jahangir, Asad and Zara's mother.
- Adnan Tariq Qureshi as Ubaidullah Khan : Humaira's husband; Abdullah's half brother; Amaan and Aisha's father. (Dead)
- Yahya Ahmad as Ibrahim
- Naima Khan as Nargis Bua : Aina's caretaker.
- Syed Mohammad Ahmed as Dr. Arsalan : Aina's psychiatrist.
- Musa as young Amanullah Khan aka Mani

== Soundtrack ==
Yeh Dil Mera

Soundtrack album by Shiraz Uppal, Naveed Nashad and Sajal Aly
- Released: Shiraz: October 2019; Sajal: October 2019
- Recorded: Shiraz's version: 2019; Sajal's version: 2019
- Genre: Television soundtrack
- Length: Shiraz: 1:10; Sajal: 1:19
- Label: MD Productions
- Producer: Momina Duraid

Music video
- "Yeh Dil Mera" OST on YouTube

Shiraz Uppal sung and composed the song Yeh dil mera while the lyrics were written by Shakeel Sohail. The other soundtrack Tip Tip was sung by Sajal Aly, who plays protagonist in the serial and Naveed Nashad and was composed by Nashad also. The lyrics of the Tip Tip were written by Aehsun Talish.

== Production ==
The show was earlier titled Mujhay Vida Kar but later changed.

The writer, Farhat Ishtiaq said that Yeh Dil Mera was supposed to be a novel; 300 pages in she faced a writer's block so she left it incomplete. In 2017, she intended to finish the novel alongside the drama adaptation but scared of the comparison, she decided to leave the novel for later.

The drama highlights childhood trauma and mental health issues.

The production location of the serial Darya Baagh is a fictional place, the shooting was actually done in Shogran, situated between Kaghan valley and Neelum Valley.

== Reception ==
=== Critical reception ===
The series received positive reviews for its haunting theme and performances of the lead couple. Sadaf Haider of DAWN Images, in her review of the first two episodes, praised the performances of the lead pair and the strong plot of Farhat Ishtiaq's script. In another review, Haider praises the show's unique storyline, strong performances of the actors, nuanced characters, and the chemistry of the lead couple, but criticizes its poor direction, continuity issues, and repetitive dialogues. A reviewer from Daily Times lauded the story of the serial stating, "It wasn’t only mysterious but also a show that heavily focuses on the theme of Mental Health, a subject that is spoken very briefly about and sometimes also ignored." Maliha Rehman of Dawn was appreciative of the Aly and Raza Mir's chemistry, writing "There are many scenes that are remarkable, in which revenge battles with love, confusion creates doubts, and the past threatens to tarnish the lead pair’s romance.", but was critical of bad direction. Sarah Hameed of The News International lauded the portrayal of mental health issues in the whole series but criticised its trivialising in the last episode.

=== Controversy ===
After the release of teasers of the show, the show was heavily criticised for the publicity of sexual harassment in the work place as a romantic genre, to which Farhat Ishtiaq replied that by watching the teaser of just 30 seconds, the whole story of the show cannot be predicted. Viewers will see that why she (Aina) went for the job interview with such a heavy makeup. It may be that both characters know each other already.

== Accolades ==
| Year | Award | Category | Recipient | Result | Ref. |
|---|---|---|---|---|---|
| 7 February 2020 | Pakistan International Screen Awards | Best Television Play | Momna Duraid | Nominated | |
| 7 February 2020 | Pakistan International Screen Awards | Best Television Director | Aehsun Talish | Nominated | |
| 7 February 2020 | Pakistan International Screen Awards | Best Television Writer | Farhat Ishtiaq | Nominated | |
| 7 February 2020 | Pakistan International Screen Awards | Best Original Soundtrack | Shiraj Uppal | Nominated | |
| October 9, 2021 | Lux Style Awards | Best TV Serial | Momina Duraid | Nominated | |
| October 9, 2021 | Lux Style Awards | Best TV Writer | Farhat Ishtiaq | Nominated | |
| October 9, 2021 | Lux Style Awards | Best Male Actor - Critics | Ahad Raza Mir | Nominated | |
| October 9, 2021 | Lux Style Awards | Best Male Actor - Viewer's Choice | Ahad Raza Mir | Nominated | |
| October 9, 2021 | Lux Style Awards | Best Original Soundtrack | Naved Nashad and Sajal Aly | Nominated | |
