= Aangan (2018 TV series) =

Pakistani period drama series

- Urdu: آنگن
- Based on: Aangan by Khadija Mastoor
- Screenplay by: Mustafa Afridi
- Directed by: Mohammed Ehteshamuddin
- Starring: Mawra Hocane; Ahad Raza Mir; Sajal Aly; Ahsan Khan; Hira Mani; Sonya Hussyn; Rabia Butt
- Narrated by: Mawra Hocane
- Theme music composer: Naveed Nashad
- Opening theme: Manwa Sisters
- Ending theme: Farhan Saeed; Naveed Nashad
- Composer: Naveed Nashad
- Country of origin: Pakistan
- Original language: Urdu
- No. of episodes: 27

Production
- Executive producer: Momina Duraid
- Production locations: Wazirabad; Lahore; Gujranwala; Karachi
- Cinematography: Khizer Idrees
- Production company: MD Productions

Original release
- Network: Hum TV
- Release: 20 December 2018 – 27 June 2019

Aangan (Urdu: آنگن, lit. 'Courtyard') is a Pakistani period drama series, based on the 1962 eponymous novel by Khadija Mastoor, originally broadcast on Hum TV. Apart from the initial few episodes, the story set in British India, is narrated by Aaliya, who is an ambitious girl and witnesses the stories of relations affected at the time of partition of India, presenting the trials and tribulations as her own family is divided.

The serial was created and produced by Momina Duraid under MD Productions and directed by Mohammed Ehteshamuddin. Based on Mastoor's novel, Mustafa Afridi wrote the screenplay. The serial stars Mawra Hocane as Aaliya, Ahsan Khan as Subhan and Safdar (dual role), Sonya Hussyn as Salma, Sajal Aly as Chammi, Ahad Raza Mir as Jameel, Hira Mani as Tehmina, and Rabia Butt as Kusum.

Aangan was highly anticipated, with a huge star cast and a high production budget. It mostly received positive reviews from critics and praise for its cinematography, visuals, and performances, especially Aly's performance. It received multiple nominations at the 19th Lux Style Awards, including Best TV Play, Best TV Actress (critics and viewers) for Aly, and Best Director.

== Premise ==
Set in pre-Partition India, the story begins with Khameera Illahi, the strict matriarch of a large haveli. Her unfaithful husband, Muzaffar, brings Israr, his son from another woman, into the household, where he is never fully accepted. Khameera's daughter Salma falls in love with Subhan, a poor man whom her family considers unsuitable, and elopes with him. She later dies of tuberculosis, leaving behind their infant son, Safdar, who is raised by her brother Mazhar after Subhan leaves. Years later, Mazhar's daughters Aaliya and Tehmina grow up alongside Safdar. The sisters befriend their Hindu neighbour Kusum, a young widow in love with Mohan, while Tehmina and Safdar also develop feelings for each other. Tehmina's mother opposes their relationship and arranges her marriage to her cousin Jameel. Safdar, unwilling to defy the family, leaves after asking Tehmina to move on, and she subsequently dies by suicide. Kusum also dies by suicide after being betrayed by Mohan.

After Mazhar is imprisoned for attacking a British officer, Aaliya and her mother return to the ancestral haveli, where they live with Khameera; her eldest son Azhar, who is involved in the independence movement; Azhar's family; Israr; the family servant Kareeman; and Chammi, the daughter of Zafar (Khameera's middle son who lives elsewhere). Chammi has long been attached to Jameel, who initially flirts with her casually but later becomes interested in Aaliya. Having witnessed the deaths of Tehmina and Kusum, Aaliya becomes distrustful of romantic love and repeatedly rejects him, choosing instead to focus on her education. Although she eventually develops feelings for Jameel, she remains distant, and he later joins the British forces and leaves the haveli. Mazhar subsequently dies in prison. Chammi is married elsewhere and later returns briefly with her daughter, Tameezan, visibly changed by an unhappy marriage. When Jameel returns and again professes his feelings for Aaliya, she refuses him, partly because of his earlier treatment of Chammi. As Partition approaches, Aaliya and her mother migrate to Pakistan, expecting support from her maternal uncle and his English wife, but are instead sent to live in a house abandoned by a Hindu family. In India, Azhar is killed, leaving the haveli increasingly deserted. In Pakistan, Aaliya begins teaching at a refugee camp, where she grows close to Dr. Ehsan but distances herself after becoming disillusioned by his materialism and class prejudice. She also gives shelter to Shakeel, who has fled to Pakistan, only for him to steal her jewellery and disappear. These experiences weaken Aaliya's idealistic view of the new country and make her increasingly wary of the people around her. Aaliya later encounters Safdar again and initially blames him for Tehmina's death. After he apologizes, they gradually grow close and Aaliya begins to believe that he has retained the kindness she remembers from childhood. Her mother becomes receptive to their marriage after learning that Safdar is now a wealthy businessman, but Aaliya rejects him after hearing him emphasize his wealth while seeking her mother's approval, believing that he too has become driven by material concerns.

Aaliya eventually receives a letter from Chammi, who has left her abusive marriage and returned to the haveli with her daughter. Chammi encourages Jameel to marry someone else, believing that he will never return her feelings, but admits that she remained in India because she could not bring herself to leave him. Moved by her devotion, Jameel asks her to marry him. Reading the letter, Aaliya reflects on the lives of those around her and realizes that her fear of emotional loss has repeatedly prevented her from accepting love. The series ends with her contemplating how those around her spent their lives pursuing love, belonging, security and the futures they once imagined.

== Cast ==
=== Main ===
Main characters of Aangan featuring (left to right) Hira Mani as Tehmina, Ahsan Khan as Safdar, Mawra Hocane as Aaliya, Ahad Raza Mir as Jameel, Sajal Aly as Chammi and Sonya Hussyn as Salma

- Mawra Hocane as Aaliya / Bitto (as called by her parents and sister): Mazhar's daughter; Tehmina's sister
- Ahad Raza Mir as Jameel; Azhar's son; a poet and a politician
- Sajal Aly as Chammi : Zafar's daughter
- Ahsan Khan in dual roles as :
  - Subhan : Salma's husband; Safdar's father
  - Safdar : Salma and Subhan's son
- Hira Mani as Tehmina : Mazhar's daughter; Aaliya's sister
- Sonya Hussyn as Salma : Subhan's wife; Safdar's mother

=== Recurring ===
- Zaib Rehman as Khameera Illahi : the domineering matriarch of the haveli; Salma's mother
- Abid Ali as Nawab Muzaffar Ali Khan : Khameera's husband; Salma and Israr's father
- Omair Rana as Mazhar Ali Khan : Salma's brother; Tehmina and Aaliya's father
- Madiha Rizvi as Fareeda : Mazhar's wife; Tehmina and Aaliya's mother
- Mustafa Afridi as Azhar Ali Khan : Salma's brother; Shakeel and Jameel's father
- Uzma Beg as Azhar's wife; Shakeel and Jameel's mother
- Hassan Noman as Israr; Muzaffar's illegitimate son
- Shehroz Sabzwari as Dr. Ehsaan
- Rabia Butt as Kusum; a Hindu widow
- Beena Masroor as a househelp at Mazhar's house in Ghazipur
- Shehryaar Ali as Shakeel : Azhar's son; Jameel's brother
- Shabana Bhatti as Kareeman Bua
- Shehzad Kashmiri
- Ali Rizvi as Mohan; Kusum's love and ex-husband
- Shamayal Tareen as Najma : Salma's younger sister
  - Haleema Bint Fatima as young Najma
- Akbar Islam as Rai Mahinder Singh : Kussum's father
- Khizer Gul
- Alizay Javed
- Shazia Goher as Didi; Mohan's sister
- Waseem Manzoor as Zafar Ali Khan; Chammi's father (Episode 4)
- Babar Zaheer as Postman (Episode 5)

== Background and production ==
=== Writing ===
The novel Aangan was written by Khadija Mastoor in 1962, and won the Adamji Literacy Award in the next year. It was also translated into 13 languages, with The Women's Courtyard in English by Daisy Rockwell. While the original novel is set in the 1940s and 1950s, Dawn Images reported in December 2017 that this drama, which is based on that novel, is planned as a three-part series spanning a number of decades and will also feature the story of the 1980s and 2000s as in continuity.

The director Ehteshamuddin told The News in a March 2017 interview, "It was initially thought out as a film but now we're making a play out of it," adding, "We might turn it into a film later." He chose Mustafa Afridi to write the screenplay. Mustafa told Daily Times in a September 2018 interview that it took him a year to "understand the novel and a year and a half to adapt it" as a script. He commented that "all the characters have been defined in" skilled great detail by the author, and he worked hard to "stay true" to the "essence of the novel and its characters" while script-writing. He strongly hoped to "take the story forward from where" Khadija left it, into two sequels.

It is based on the partition of the Indian Subcontinent and the resulting independence of Pakistan. It depicts a Hindustani family that was divided mercilessly before the partition of Pakistan by the unfortunate time incidents. The story also has a political take, including British Raj, All-India Muslim League and Indian National Congress.

In a January 2018 interview, the director praised the simplicity of the novel, "It sheds light on the revolution that women went through in those times", and "Set in an inner courtyard, the story has been told from the perspective of a woman." On 17 October 2017, it was reported that Mawra Hocane had signed up for the project. On 28 March, Dawn Images published an interview with Mawra, in which she revealed she will be playing the protagonist and narrator of the story. The story will be told from her character's perspective, who will be seen romancing three men.

=== Casting and filming ===
On 19 October 2017, it was reported that Ahsan Khan had signed up for Aangan, along with Sajal Aly and Ahad Raza Mir. On 4 November, Sonya Hussyn signed up for the project, all in the lead cast.

Production location of the serial in Wazirabad.

Principal photography began on 7 November 2017 in Wazirabad. Sajal confirmed her shoot on 5 December, while Mawra on 27 December. Other cast in supporting roles include Abid Ali and Zaib Rehman, along with Omair Rana and Uzma Hassan. It was revealed that Ahsan will be playing double roles in the drama, and he will be romancing three women. The first spell was completed in January 2018, and then the second spell was completed in March.

Hira Mani joined the cast in third shooting spell, also as in lead role. On 19 July, it was revealed that Rabia Butt will have a cameo role in the drama and two songs have been picturised on her. Other cast include Madiha Rizvi, Shehzad Kashmiri and Ali Rizvi. The spell took place between June and August 2018 in Karachi. On 26 September, the role of Shehroz Sabzwari was also revealed. The casting was mostly done by Momina Duraid, who reportedly kept delaying the shoots to cast the right actors she wanted, as they were not available before. Khizer Idrees has served as the cinematographer for the drama.

=== Promotion ===
Talking about her family background, Sonya Hussyn shared to The Express Tribune that she thinks she relates "to the world that Aangan is set in"; she revealed her role to be extended special appearance. Mawra Hocane told about her character to The News that they have "been developing" it "every day on set" to ensure "the sort of person Aaliya is". Ahad Raza Mir commented to The News on his character, "he's somebody who is on a journey of what love means, what family bonds mean". Ahsan commented to Something Haute that the "story revolves around the characters played by Mawra, Ahad, Sajal, Sonya, Hira and" himself, adding that they all are "connected to each other in a certain way which is very different". He further told The News that the drama is shot in "a very unique way", like never have been "seen before on Pakistani television". Sajal Aly told Gulf Times that every character "is equally important", having "its own journey", as it "follows multiple beautiful characters" and is "about everyone involved". She added that "it focuses on the partition of a family" as "physical and emotional divide of a country".

The curtain raiser, hosted by Sanam Jang, was telecast live on 13 December 2018. The drama began on 20 December, and aired an episode every Thursday.

The drama marked the second appearance of Ahsan Khan with Sonya Hussyn and with Mawra Hocane after the Haasil (2016), and Ahsan with Sonya after Marasim. It also marked the second collaboration of Ahad Raza Mir with Mawra after Sammi (2017), and with Sajal Aly and Hira Mani after the Yaqeen Ka Safar (2017). It was the fifth collaboration of the director with MD Productions after Aseerzadi (2013), Sadqay Tumhare (2014), Preet Na Kariyo Koi (2015) also starring Ahsan and Hira, and Udaari (2016) while director's third collaboration also with writer after Aseerzadi (2013) and Mohabbat.PK (2017).

== Release and distribution ==
=== Broadcast ===
Aangan's first episode was aired on 20 December 2018 while before the series premiere introductional program of the show The Curtain Raiser was aired on 13 December 2018. It aired weekly episode every Thursday at 8:00pm succeeding Duraid's Main Khayal Hoon Kisi Aur Ka. It was aired on Hum Europe in UK, on Hum TV USA in USA and Hum TV Mena in UAE, with same timings and 20 December 2018 being the premier date. All International broadcasting aired the series in accordance with their standard times.

State channel PTV Home acquired the rights of syndication of series and started to telecast it from February 2020.

In September 2026, the serial began to broadcast again on prime time slot on Hum TV succeeding the network's Aap Ki Izzat.

=== Home media and digital release ===
After the series premiere, Hum TV announced that the episodes of the serial will not be uploaded on YouTube. In April 2020, Hocane revealed that the serial will be released on a digital platform, and is currently being is re-edited.

== Reception ==
=== Critical response ===
The series received mostly positive reviews from critics with praise towards the performances, visuals and cinematography. Aly's performance received widespread critical acclaim as is regarded as one of her best.

In November 2018, the series received immense appraisal for its promos.

On its first episode, the series received positive reviews. Sadaf Haider of DAWN Images praised the writing of the series due to the nuanced characters and the treatment of the minority characters, and noted the direction due to authenticity of the era and visuals. While reviewing the first three episodes, Faizan Javed of The Nation praised the performances of Sonya Hussyn and Ahsan Khan and noted the attention to detail and set design.

Sajal Aly's performance as Chammi received widespread acclaim from critics, and is regarded as one of her best. Maira Kiari of Dawn Images ranked her performance among the top 6 performances of the television in 2019. Buraq Shabbir of The News International praised the character of Chammi for its strong headedness and resilience including it among the "inspirational characters". After concluding the series, In another review she hailed it as "her lifetime performance", and further opined that she, "stole the limelight and overshadowed everyone and everything else surrounding the recently concluded play." While writing for Masala.com, the reviewer noted the grey shades, problems and the free-spirit of the character and praised Aly's performance.

=== Ratings ===
The show was popular in UK where it mostly topped the chart among the Urdu television serials while the 15th episode of the show took the lead among all the Asian television shows and was watched by 49,200 viewers – peaking at 50,500 viewers according to the exclusive data obtained by BizAsia.

== Soundtrack ==
Aangan

Soundtrack album by Naveed Nashad
- Recorded: 2018
- Language: Urdu
- Label: Hum
- Producer: Momina Duraid
External media
Audio
- "Aangan" – Wavella on SoundCloud
- "Aangan – Bali Banno" on SoundCloud
Video
- "Aangan" OST – Haari Haari on YouTube
- "Aangan" OST – Dhandora on YouTube

The various soundtracks were prepared for the serial. The original soundtrack "Haari Haari" was performed by Farhan Saeed and Naveed Nashad, lyrics were written by Imran Raza while composed by Nashad also. The other soundtracks such as "Bholi Bano" and "Wavella" were played and picturized on a single specific occasion.

No.	Title	Lyrics	Music	Performer(s)	Length
1.	"Dhandora"	Mustafa Afridi	Naveed Nashad	Manwa Sisters (chorus)	1:04
2.	"Hari Hari"	Imran Raza	Naveed Nashad	Farhan Saeed & Naveed Nashad	3:04
3.	"Moray Sanwariya"
4.	"Wavella"				2:45
5.	"Bali Banno"			Manwa Sisters	3:15
6.	"Nazar Lag Jaye Na"

== Accolades ==
Year	Award	Category	nominee(s)	Result	Ref.
July 8, 2019	Lux Style Awards	Best Original Soundtrack	Farhan Saeed & Naveed Nashad	Nominated	
February 7, 2020	Pakistan International Screen Awards	Best Television Director	Mohammed Ehteshamuddin	Nominated	
February 7, 2020	Pakistan International Screen Awards	Best Television Actor	Ahad Raza Mir	Nominated	
February 7, 2020	Pakistan International Screen Awards	Best Television Actress	Sajal Aly	Nominated	
February 7, 2020	Pakistan International Screen Awards	Best Original Soundtrack	Farhan Saeed and Naved Nashad	Nominated	
December 31, 2020	Lux Style Awards	Best TV Play	Momina Duraid	Nominated	
December 31, 2020	Lux Style Awards	Best Director	Mohammed Ehteshamuddin	Nominated	
December 31, 2020	Lux Style Awards	Best Television Actress- Viewer's Choice	Sajal Aly	Nominated	
December 31, 2020	Lux Style Awards	Best Television Actress- Critics Choice	Sajal Aly	Nominated	

== See also ==
- Artistic depictions of the partition of India
