= Dumpukht - Aatish-e-Ishq =

Pakistani television show

- Written by: Zafar Mairaj
- Directed by: Kashif Nisar
- Starring: Nauman Ijaz; Sonia Mishal; Bilal Abbas Khan
- Theme music composer: Sahir Ali Bagga
- Opening theme: Shahbaz; Fayyaz
- Country of origin: Pakistan
- Original language: Urdu
- No. of episodes: 27

Production
- Producers: Kashif Nisar; Moomal Shunaid
- Cinematography: Hassam Mairaj
- Running time: 35-40 minutes
- Production companies: Larachi Entertainment; Moomal Entertainment

Original release
- Network: A-Plus TV
- Release: 13 July 2016 – 18 January 2017

Dumpukht - Aatish-e-Ishq is a Pakistani television social drama series co-produced by Kashif Nisar and Moomal Entertainment. It is directed by Nisar and written by Zafar Mairaj. It features Nauman Ijaz, Sonia Mishal and Bilal Abbas Khan in lead roles. It first aired on 13 July 2016 on A-Plus TV.

== Synopsis ==
"Dumpukht" is a cooking technique in which rice, meat and vegetables are cooked on a low flame in a dough-sealed pot. Thus, the story revolves around the passion of love, which faces societal pressure and foreign heat and creates fire which causes destruction.

== Plot ==
The plot revolves around a conservative household that firmly believes in the Peer Babas and follows Peer Habib Ullah in every matter, whether business or personal. The daughter of the elder brother, Kulsoom, is preparing for her exams and goes to Mehar Nigar's house for tuition. Mehar Nigar is constantly worried about her son Bilal, who has been living with his father since the age of twelve years. Mehar Nigar wants to bring back her son. Due to her sadness about her son, Kulsoom decides to take a taweez (an amulet) from Peer Sahab as she has the same views about this as her.

== Cast ==
- Sonia Mishal as Kulsoom
- Nauman Ijaz as Peer Habib Ullah: Peer sahab of Kulsoom's family
- Bilal Abbas Khan as Bilal "Billu": son of Kulsoom's teacher, Mehar Nigar
- Saman Ansari as Noor Bano "Bibi Saheba": Peer Sahab's wife
- Asma Abbas as Tahira: Kulsoom's mother
- Anjum Habibi as Kulsoom's father
- Aamna Malick as Nimmo: Kulsoom's cousin
- Munazzah Arif as Rabia: Nimmo's mother
- Haseeb Khan as Nimmo's father
- Saqib Sameer as Haroon
- Saba Faisal as Mehar Nigar: Kulsoom's tuition teacher and Billu's mother

== Accolades ==
Year	Award	Category	Recipient(s) and nominee(s)	Result	Ref.
April 19, 2017	Lux Style Awards	Best Television Director	Kashif Nisar	Nominated	
April 19, 2017	Lux Style Awards	Best Television Actor	Nauman Ijaz	Nominated	
April 19, 2017	Lux Style Awards	Best Television Writer	Zafar Mairaj	Nominated	
