= Chammi =

- Aangan character
- Created by: Khadija Mastoor
- Portrayed by: Sajal Aly

In-universe information
- Race: Asian
- Gender: Female
- Spouse: Jameel
- Religion: Muslim

Chammi is a fictional character and parallel protagonist of the 1960 novel Aangan by Khadija Mastoor and Ehteshamuddin's 2018 TV series.

Sajal Aly portrayed the character in the TV series and earned widespread critical acclaim.

== Biography of the fictional character ==
Chammi lives in a small house of her grandmother in British India where her father has left her after her mother's death. Chammi shares a strong bond with Aaliya, the protagonist of the novel and loves Jameel, son of her great-uncle. She is a diehard supporter of All India Muslim League. She first marries a peasant on the insistence of the family, when Jameel rejects her. At the time of partition, she refused her husband to go to Pakistan.
