= Kis Se Kahoon =

2014 Pakistani television series

- Genre: Romance; Youth show
- Written by: Shahid Nadeem
- Directed by: Kashif Nisar
- Starring: Sajal Aly; Agha Ali; Yumna Zaidi
- Opening theme: Main Kis Se Kahoon
- Country of origin: Pakistan
- Original language: Urdu
- No. of seasons: 1
- No. of episodes: 16

Production
- Production location: Karachi
- Editor: Arbab Khan
- Camera setup: Multi-camera
- Running time: Approx. 40-45 minutes

Original release
- Network: PTV Home
- Release: 7 December 2014 – 22 March 2015

Kis Se Kahoon (Urdu:کس سے کہوں), also known as Kis Se Kahoon - Ek Kahani Unsuni (Urdu: کس سے کہوں - ایک کہانی اَن سُنی) is a 2014 youth-based Pakistani television series that aired on PTV Home. The series was written by Shahid Nadeem, directed by Kashif Nisar and produced by Pakistan Television Corporation in collaboration with Communications Research Strategies. It stars an ensemble cast of Sajal Aly, Agha Ali, Yumna Zaidi, Essa Chaudhary and Seemi Raheel with a special appearance by Samina Ahmad. It was aired on PTV Home every Sunday from 2014 to 2015.

== Synopsis ==
In the two classes of our society, rich parents focus on their own and their children's other needs, while poor parents focus on their own and their children's basic needs. Both of them have no time for their children, which has become a major problem in both classes, due to which the youth entering adolescence suffer not only from bad company but also from various diseases.

== Plot ==
Hadiqa (Sajal Aly) is the daughter of Mr and Mrs Qureshi (Mohsin Gilani and Seemi Raheel). Mrs Qureshi lives with her mother and daughter in a village in the Northern region, while Mr Qureshi works in Saudi Arabia. Hadiqa's grandmother (Samina Ahmed) raises her. She has brought her up to be simple and self-confident while she lives in that small village.

However, her life changes when she returns to the city with her parents and gets admission to an educational institution. Hadiqa impresses her fellow students with her self-confidence, makes many good friends, and meets Fahad Iqbal (Agha Ali), the scion of a wealthy family. He has no respect for girls. When he loses a basketball match to Hadiqa, Fahad bets with his friends to humiliate Hadiqa in every possible way. And later, because of her simplicity, Hadiqa falls into the trap of Fahd's friendship. He uses this friendship for his nefarious purposes through the internet.

Another main character is the daughter of Hadiqa's maid, Salma (Yumna Zaidi), who becomes Hadiqa's friend. Hadiqa, who is in trouble, tries to improve Salma's life.

== Cast ==
- Sajal Aly as Hadiqa Qureshi
- Yumna Zaidi as Salma
- Agha Ali as Fahad Iqbal
- Mohsin Gillani as Mr. Qureshi
- Seemi Raheel as Mrs. Qureshi
- Iftikhar Thakur as Salma's father
- Samina Ahmad as Hadiqa's grandmother
- Aqdas Waseem as Akbar
- Essa Chaudhary
