= O Rangreza =

Pakistani television series

- Urdu: او رنگریزہ
- Genre: Drama; Romance
- Written by: Saji Gul
- Directed by: Kashif Nisar
- Starring: Sajal Ali; Nauman Ijaz; Bilal Abbas Khan; Sana Nawaz
- Composer: Sahir Ali Bagga
- Country of origin: Pakistan
- Original language: Urdu
- No. of seasons: 1
- No. of episodes: 31

Production
- Producer: Moomal Entertainment
- Camera setup: Multi-camera setup
- Running time: 32 minutes
- Production company: Hum Network

Original release
- Network: Hum TV
- Release: 28 July 2017 – 23 February 2018

O Rangreza (Urdu: او رنگریزہ) is a Pakistani romantic drama television series that aired on Hum TV. It starred Sajal Ali and Bilal Abbas Khan in the lead roles. Saji Gul wrote the drama, and Kashif Nisar directed it. Nisar had previously directed Dumpukht - Aatish-e-Ishq, which also starred Khan along with Sonia Mishal and Nauman Ijaz.

== Plot ==
Sassi Khayyam (Sajal Ali) makes her father, Khayyam Sani (Nauman Ijaz), her ideal and follows in his footsteps. She treats her mother, Mumtaz "Mammo" Khayyam (Irsa Ghazal), as badly as Khayyam does. Her maternal cousin (mother's sister's son), Qasim (Bilal Abbas Khan), who has lived with her family since childhood after the death of his parents, is in love with Sassi but stops himself from expressing his feelings, thinking about Khayyam's favours for him in the past. Khayyam loves an actress, Sonia Jahan (Sana Nawaz), and Sassi starts to follow in her footsteps. She often visits Sonia and learns from her.

Sassi and Sonia perform at Khayyam's birthday. Khayyam finds this embarrassing and slaps Sassi. Sassi starts hating her father. Khayyam wants Qasim to marry Sassi, but Qasim refuses. Sassi finds solace in Sonia's ex-husband and director, Wajih Kamal (Omair Rana), and starts working on his films. However, Wajih dislikes her due to Khayyam's affair with Sonia. Sassi's elder brother, Tipu Khayyam (Hamza Firdous), comes from London with his westernised non-Muslim girlfriend, Mina (Sonia Mishal). Mumtaz doesn't like Mina due to her westernised life and being a non-Muslim. Tipu is arrogant and stubborn like Sassi.

Sonia poisons Khayyam and escapes because she does not love him. Khayyam wakes up and repents over every persecution he did for Sonia Jahan. He is unable to complete the poetry he started for Sonia.

Mina takes an interest in Islam. She asks Qasim to choose a name for her. He chooses the name, Amna. Later, Amna falls for Qasim, but Qasim rejects her saying he can only love Sassi. Tipu transfers the house in Amna's name and decides to marry her. He plans to remove Khayyam, Sonia, Sassi, and Mammo from the haveli. Qasim marries Amna and becomes the owner, thus saving the members. Meanwhile, Sonia becomes ill, and her organs start failing. She dies in Khayyam's house. Sassi becomes an actress with her film Sonia Jahan which is a tribute to the life of the actress.

Qasim falls in love with Amna, and Sassi overhears and gets jealous. Now crazy to win Qasim back, she pushes Amna. But Amna is saved. Khayyam requests Amna to permit Qasim to marry Sassi. Amna unwillingly agrees. On the wedding day, Sassi rejects Qasim as she realises that Qasim loves Amna.

== Cast ==
- Sajal Ali as Sassi Khayyam : Khayyam and Mumtaz's daughter; Tipu's sister; Qasim's cousin and love interest.
- Bilal Abbas Khan as Mohammad Qasim : Abid's son; Sassi's cousin and love interest; Amna's husband.
- Nauman Ijaz as Khayyam Sani : Mumtaz's husband; Sassi and Tipu's father; Sonia's lover.
- Sana Nawaz as Sonia Jahan : Khayyam's love interest; Wajhi's ex wife.
- Sonia Mishal as Mina/Amna Qasim: Tipu's love interest; Qasim's wife.
- Irsa Ghazal as Mumtaz "Mammo" Khayyam : Khayyam's wife; Sassi and Tipu's mother.
- Hamza Firdous as Tipu Khayyam : Khayyam and Mumtaz's son; Sassi's brother; Mina's love interest.
- Sohail Tariq
- Umer Dar as Ramazan : Qasim's shop worker
- Fareeha Jabeen as Kareeman Bua : Mumtaz's househelp.
- Omair Rana as Wajih Kamal : Sonia's ex husband.
- Tanveer Malik as Khayyam's friend
- Haseeb Khan as Mushtaq : Sonia's manager
- Maryam Noor as Aiman : Sassi and Qasim's neighbour.
- Rizwan Riaz as Qasim's shop worker
- Faisal Kichi
- Waseem Akram

== Production ==
Bilal, on the set of O Rangreza, said that "it’s a beautiful story; I play a dye wala, and my whole get-up is like that. I fall in love with a girl played by Sajal, who is my first cousin, and from there the play will unravel and the story will unfold. All the characters involved have their own story to tell, which will make O Rangreza an interesting watch as it is quite different. Besides Sajal and myself, the play will also feature Nauman Ejaz and Sonia Mishal."

== Soundtrack ==
O Rangreza

Soundtrack album by Sahir Ali Bagga and Sajal Ali
- Released: Sahir: July 2017; Sajal: October 2017
- Recorded: Sahir's version: April 2017; Sajal's version: September 2017
- Length: Sahir: 1:29; Sajal: 2:53
- Label: Moomal Entertainment
- Producer: Moomal Shunaid

Music video
- Video on YouTube

Initially, Sahir Ali Bagga sang and composed the song of O Rangreza. In September 2017, Sajal Ali also sang parts of the song with Sahir, which was also composed by him. All lyrics were written by the writer of the serial, Saji Gul, under the company Moomal Entertainment.

== Release ==
=== Broadcast ===
Hum Europe broadcast the show in the UK, Hum TV MENA in the UAE, and Hum World in the United States and Canada.

=== Home media and digital release ===
Initially, the show was available on Hum TV's official YouTube channel, but the channel later deleted all the episodes. It was also available on the iflix app till 2019, when the channel terminated its contract with the app. In August 2019, Hum TV reuploaded all the episodes on their YouTube channel with muted music. Furthermore, in July 2020, the show was released on the ZEE5 app, along with some other Pakistani dramas.

== Reception ==
=== Critical reception ===
While reviewing the first episode, The Nation praised several performances, Gul's writing, and Nisar's direction. In a review of the first five episodes of the series, a Dunya News critic praised the show's refreshing storyline, skillful direction, well-crafted, complex characters, and also commended the outstanding performances of the actors, particularly Sajal Aly, Sana Fakhar, and Bilal Abbas Khan.

Along with a few other television series of the season, DAWN Images listed it as a series with an off-beat story.

== Accolades ==
Year	Award	For	Receipt	Result	Refs
2018	Lux Style Awards	Best Television Actress	Sajal Aly	Nominated	
2018	Lux Style Awards	Best Writer	Saji Gul	Nominated	
2018	Lux Style Awards	Best Director	Kashif Nisar	Nominated	
2018	Lux Style Awards	Best Television Play	O Rangreza	Nominated	
2018	Lux Style Awards	Best Original Soundtrack	Sahir Ali Bagga	Nominated	
2018	Hum Awards	Best Drama Serial Jury	O Rangreza	Nominated	
2018	Hum Awards	Best Drama Serial Popular	O Rangreza	Nominated	
2018	Hum Awards	Best Director	Kashif Nisar	Won	
2018	Hum Awards	Best Writer	Saji Gul	Nominated	
2018	Hum Awards	Best Actor Male Popular	Noman Ijaz	Nominated	
2018	Hum Awards	Best Actor Male Jury	Noman Ijaz	Nominated	
2018	Hum Awards	Best Actor Female Popular	Sajal Aly	Nominated	
2018	Hum Awards	Best Actor Female Jury	Sajal Aly	Won	
2018	Hum Awards	Best Supporting Actor	Bilal Abbas Khan	Nominated	
2018	Hum Awards	Best Supporting Actress	Irsa Ghazal	Nominated	
2018	Hum Awards	Best on-screen couple Popular	Sajal Aly and Bilal Abbas Khan	Nominated	
2018	Hum Awards	Best on-screen couple Jury	Sajal Aly and Bilal Abbas Khan	Won	
2018	Hum Awards	Best Original Soundtrack	Sahir Ali Bagga	Won	

== See also ==
- List of programs broadcast by Hum TV
- 2017 in Pakistani television
