= Sannata =

Pakistani television series

- Genre: Drama; Thriller
- Written by: Saji Gul
- Directed by: Kashif Nisar
- Starring: Saba Qamar; Sajal Aly; Danish Taimoor; Yumna Zaidi; Adnan Shah Tipu; Shabbir Jan; Nadia Afgan
- Opening theme: "Main Kab Se"
- Country of origin: Pakistan
- Original language: Urdu
- No. of episodes: 28

Production
- Producers: Abdullah Seja; Nauman Masood
- Running time: ~45 minute
- Production company: Idream Entertainment

Original release
- Network: ARY Digital
- Release: 3 October 2013 – 17 April 2014

Sannata (Urdu: سناٹا, lit. 'Stillness') is a Pakistani thriller drama television series aired on ARY Digital. It is directed by Kashif Nisar and written by Saji Gul, starring Saba Qamar, Danish Taimoor, and Sajal Aly in the lead roles. Abdullah Seja and Nauman Masood produced the drama under their production banner IDream Entertainment.

== Plot ==
The story revolves around two cousins. Due to circumstances, young Rukayya takes on the role of a mother to her infant cousin sister and names her Pari.

Pari's mother, Husna, ran away and married Babban, going against her parents' wishes. When she had eloped, her only elder brother died while searching for her, and her father died after his son's death. The family is now only left with Apa Bi (Husna's mother), Salma (Husna's widowed elder sister), Ruqayya (Salma's daughter) and Naseeban (the family's maid).

A pregnant Husna comes back after Babar had threatened to sell her. While giving birth to Pari, Husna (who stayed outside her house in a tent as Apa Bi didn't let her inside the Haveli) dies, and Apa Bi disowns Pari and decides to hand her to her father, Babban, who might sell her as well. But young Ruqayya is very attached to Pari and resents and opposes her decision. She refuses to let Pari go and eventually the adults give in. Years pass by, and young Ruqayya becomes mature at a very young age. With the help of Naseeban, she brings up Pari.

In their childhood, they met their cousin Aazam who is younger than Ruqayya. Aazam's father, Ashfaq, is the brother of Apa Bi and who, after the death of her husband, managed their business and their expenses. During their first visit, young Pari fights with Aazam and Aazam's mother, Nafisa (the second wife of Ashfaq), scolds Pari and leaves.

Apa Bi hates Pari and calls her Dayan (witch) and says that she will devour the whole house. In the background, we see the past life of Naseeban, where she fell in love with a tree.

The show leaps. Now Pari is a grown-up teenager while Ruqayya has crossed thirty and is still unmarried.

Aazam has now grown up and visits the Haveli frequently. Pari, who is extremely possessive of Ruqayya, hates him. She thinks he might marry Ruqayya and take her away from her. Aazam develops a liking for Ruqayya. He visits again, stays away from Ruqayya, and gets close to Pari.

Meanwhile, Pari has mental attacks, and Ruqayya takes her to a mosque and Hakim for treatment. At the mosque, she meets Shauki, a mentally ill beggar who stares at Pari.

Aazam visits again, and Pari has attacks again. Ruqayya calls Hakim, and Aazam doesn't like his way of treatment and takes Ruqayya and Pari to his home for Pari's treatment. Pari is diagnosed with Epilepsy and a personality disorder. There, he confesses to Ruqayya that he loves Pari only because she is so important to her. He asks her to marry him, but she refuses as she is older than him.

Ruqayya returns to their Haveli along with Pari, and Aazam writes her a lot of letters. Later, after a lot of problems, Ruqayya and Aazam get married. Pari dressed up as a bride and started calling herself Ruqayya. Ruqayya and Aazam ignore this and take her with them to Aazam's home.

Pari tries to get close to Aazam, and Aazam decides to send her back to Haveli. Everyone mistreats her at Haveli, so she runs away with Shauki in search of her father.

Shauki's past life story runs in the background.

Ruqayya and Aazam call the police, but Pari is untraceable. Shauki finds Babban in the city, but the old and ill Babban refuses to identify himself to them. Shauki leaves Pari at a Peer so that she is safe there. Meanwhile, the police kill Shauki and beat up Babban to trace Pari. But he doesn't say anything. He asks her friend Neelam to search for Pari. Pari starts to live with Babban. Babban realises his mistakes and realises that he might die. He takes Pari to Husna's grave and dies there.

Meanwhile, Ruqayya and Aazam go for a body's identification as it might be Pari. Due to shock and stress, Ruqayya suffers a miscarriage. Aazam learns that she will never be able to bear a child but doesn't tell Ruqayya.

Neelam goes to the Haveli to meet Apa Bi, who has paralysis. She reads a letter written by Husna and returns Husna's earrings. Looking at Apa Bi's cold behaviour, Neelam leaves.

After three years, Ruqayya finds Pari at a rehab where they deal with patients with split personality disorder. Ruqayya brings her to her house. Later, Ruqayya discovers that she will not be able to bear children. She asks Aazam to marry Pari. After many arguments, he marries Pari. Pari, due to her disorder, pretends to be Ruqayya. Pari becomes pregnant and asks Ruqayya to leave Aazam, or she will kill their child. She believes Aazam and Ruqayya only want a child and do not love her. Ruqayya goes back to Haveli. Angry Aazam visits and scolds Ruqayya and asks her to stop playing with his emotions.

The next day, Pari apologises to Ruqayya and asks for forgiveness. Ruqayya asks her the reason for her apology. She pushes Ruqayya from the stairs, and she is rushed to a hospital. Her heartbeat stops. Aazam is heartbroken and comes to Haveli and sees Pari sitting below a tree where she was born. He shouts at her that she got what she wanted as Ruqayya is no more. He said that he will always hate her and she will never be able to become Ruqayya, the only love of his life. Pari dies (saying Ruqayya will die as she feels she is Ruqayya). In the hospital, Ruqayya's heartbeat resumes, and she opens her eyes.

The drama closes with the saying that everyone accused Pari of taking away everything from Ruqayya, her childhood, her toys, her life, her husband and now she took away Ruqayya's death.

== Cast ==
- Saba Qamar as Ruqayya, Pari's cousin who brings her up with much love and affection
  - Arisha Razi as young Ruqayya
- Danish Taimoor as Aazam, Ruqayya's cousin, enamoured by her beauty
- Sajal Aly in dual role as:
  - Pari, Ruqayya's cousin dependent on her
  - Husna, Pari's mother who elopes from her house
- Samina Ahmad as Aapa Bi, Husna and Salma's mother and matriarch of the family
- Nadia Afgan as Salma, Ruqayya's mother and Aapa Bi's widowed daughter
- Shabbir Jan as Ashfaq, Aazam's father
- Nargis Rasheed as Naseeban, the maid in Aapa Bi's house
  - Yumna Zaidi as young Naseeban
- Saleem Mairaj as Babban, Pari's father and Husna's husband
- Adnan Shah Tipu as Shauki
- Seemi Raheel as Najma
- Rashid Mehmood as Taya
- Faiza Gillani as Neelam
- Mehar Bano as Gul Meena

== Production ==
The series was earlier titled as Chhaon.

The series was shot in Lahore.

== Accolades ==
=== Nominations ===
==== Lux Style Awards ====
- Best TV Actress - Saba Qamar
- Best TV Actress - Sajal Aly
- Best TV Writer - Saji Gul
- Best TV Director - Kashif Nisar
