= Haseeb Hassan =

Pakistani filmmaker

Haseeb Hasan
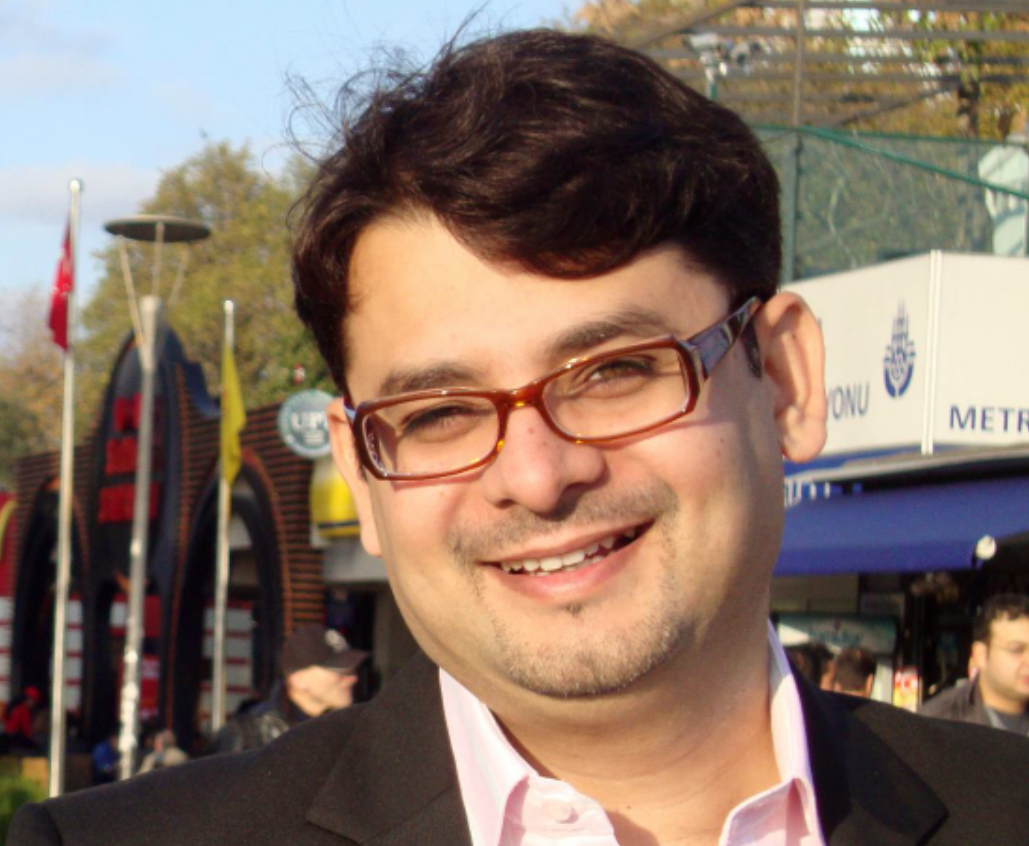
- Haseeb Hasan in 2013
- Born: Karachi, Pakistan
- Occupation: Film director
- Known for: TV Serials Nanhi, Dayar-e-Dil, Alif (TV series), Mann Mayal and Films Parwaaz Hai Junoon
- Children: 2
- Awards: Lux Style Awards; Hum Awards
- Website: www.haseebhasan.com

Haseeb Hassan (alternatively spelled Haseeb Hasan; Urdu: حسیب حسن) is a Pakistani television drama and film director. He is known for his dramas Alif, Dhoop Ki Deewar, Mann Mayal, Ahista Ahista, Dayar-e-Dil, and Bol Meri Machli.

== Early life and career ==
He is known for multiple award-winning projects including Dayar-e-Dil, Nanhi, Mann Mayal, Bol Meri Machli, and Parwaaz Hai Junoon. After working in the movie industry, he produced the web series Dhoop Ki Deewar. As of 2023, the web series is being aired on Zee5; it is written by Umera Ahmad.

== Filmography (as a Director) ==
=== Films ===
Year	Title	Writer	Notes	Ref(s)
2018	Parwaaz Hai Junoon	Farhat Ishtiaq		

=== Television ===
Year	Title	Network	Writer	Notes	Ref(s)
2019	Alif	Geo Entertainment	Umera Ahmad		
2023	Jannat Se Aagay	Geo Entertainment	Umera Ahmad		
