= Kashif Nisar =

Pakistani TV director

- Born: Pakistan
- Occupations: Television director; Television producer; screenwriter
- Years active: 2009–present
- Notable work: See Work
- Spouse: Amara Kashif
- Children: 2
- Awards: Awards

Kashif Nisar (Urdu: کاشف نثار) is a Pakistani television director, producer,and screenwriter. He is the founder of 26th Frame Entertainment. A nephew of Pakistani TV director Tariq Mairaj, Nisar has carved his own niche in the industry. His work as a television director has earned him recognition, along with numerous accolades for both his direction and screenwriting.

== Career ==
He is known for directing drama serials. Kashif's most notable works are Dumpukht - Aatish-e-Ishq, O Rungreza, Ranjha Ranjha Kardi, and Inkaar for which he was nominated for several Lux Style Awards and a Hum Award.

He won the Lux Style Award for Best Television Director for Dar Si Jaati Hai Sila and Ranjha Ranjha Kardi in 2019 and 2020, respectively.

== Filmography ==
=== Television series ===
Year	Title	Network	Credited as			Ref(s)
Year	Title	Network	Director	Producer	Screenwriter	Ref(s)
2007	Cousins	PTV Home			✓	
2009	Jinnah Ke Naam	PTV Home			✓	
2010	Faseel-e-Jaan Se Aagay (Note: Nisar directed the following episodes: Inkaar; Ada-e-Sarfaroshi; Ek Beti Ek Kahani)	PTV Home	✓			
2010	Khuda Zameen Se Gaya Nahin	PTV Home	✓			
2012	Mein	PTV Home	✓			
2013	Kami Reh Gaee	PTV Home	✓		✓	
2013	Ullu Baraye Farokht Nahi	Hum TV	✓			
2013	Ghundi	Hum Sitaray	✓			
2014	Kis Se Kahoon	PTV Home	✓			
2014	Sannata	ARY Digital	✓			
2014	Bay Emaan Mohabbat	ARY Digital	✓	✓		
2014	Ek Mohabbat Kay Baad	ARY Digital	✓			
2015	Dooriyan	Hum Sitaray	✓	✓		
2015	Aasha	PTV Home	✓		✓	Television film
2015	Sangat	Hum TV	✓			
2016	Dumpukht - Aatish-e-Ishq	A-Plus TV	✓	✓		
2016	O Rangreza	Hum TV	✓			
2016	Intezaar	A-Plus TV	✓			
2017	Pinjra	A-Plus TV	✓			
2017	Farz	PTV Home	✓			
2017	Dar Si Jaati Hai Sila	Hum TV	✓			
2018	Lashkara	ARY Digital	✓			
2018	Ranjha Ranjha Kardi	Hum TV	✓			
2019	Inkaar	Hum TV	✓			
2021	Raqeeb Se	Hum TV	✓			
2021	Dil Na Umeed To Nahi	TV One	✓			
2023	Jeevan Nagar	Green Entertainment	✓			
2023	Kabuli Pulao	Green Entertainment	✓			
2023	Working Women	Green Entertainment		✓		
2024	Mann Jogi	Hum TV	✓			
2025	Dil Wali Gali Mein	Hum TV	✓			
2026	Aik Aur Pakeezah	Geo Entertainment	✓			

=== Web-series ===
Year	Title	Platform	Credited as			Ref(s)
Year	Title	Platform	Director	Producer	Screenwriter	Ref(s)
2019	Saat Mulaqatein	Nashpati Prime	✓		✓	
2022	Mrs. & Mr. Shameem	Zee5	✓	✓		
2023	The Pink Shirt	Zee5	✓			
TBA	Teen Tara †	Zee5	✓			

== Awards and nominations ==
Year	Nominee / work	Award	Result
2009	Best TV Director / Khuda Zameen Se Gya Nahi Hai	Lux Style Awards	Nominated
2009	Best TV Writer / Jinnah Ke Naam	Lux Style Awards	Nominated
2013	Best Television Director / Mein	Lux Style Awards	Nominated
2014	Best Director Drama Serial / Ullu Baraye Farokht Nahi	Hum Awards	Nominated
2014	Best Television Director / Ullu Baraye Farokht Nahi	Lux Style Awards	Nominated
2015	Best Television Director / Sannata	Lux Style Awards	Nominated
2017	Best Television Director / Dumpukht - Aatish-e-Ishq	Lux Style Awards	Nominated
2018	Best Television Director / O Rangreza	Lux Style Awards	Nominated
2019	Best Television Director / Dar Si Jaati Hai Sila	Lux Style Awards	Won
2020	Best Television Director / Inkaar	Lux Style Awards	Nominated
2020	Best Television Director / Ranjha Ranjha Kardi	Lux Style Awards	Won
2022	Best Television Director / Raqeeb Se	Lux Style Awards	Won
2022	Best Television Director / Dil Na Umeed To Nahi	Lux Style Awards	Nominated
