= Aap Ki Izzat =

2026 Pakstani television series

- Genre: Drama
- Written by: Umera Ahmed
- Directed by: Saife Hassan
- Starring: Urwa Hocane; Ahsan Khan; Saif Ali Khan
- Country of origin: Pakistan
- Original language: Urdu
- No. of seasons: 1
- No. of episodes: 22

Production
- Producers: Momina Duraid; Nina Kashif
- Running time: 35 minutes
- Production company: Momina Duraid Productions

Original release
- Network: Hum TV
- Release: 17 July – 22 September 2026

Aap Ki Izzat is a 2026 Pakistani drama television series, directed by Saife Hassan, and written by Umera Ahmed. It is produced by Nina Kashif and Momina Duraid under banner Momina Duraid Productions. It starts Urwa Hocane and Ahsan Khan with Saif Ali Khan and Sania Saeed in pivotal roles. It premiered on Hum TV in 17 July 2026.

== Plot ==
Beena is a devoted housewife who feels emotionally empty despite living a luxurious life with her wealthy husband, Tabish, and their two children. She often reminisces about the early days of their marriage, when they shared a deep and loving relationship and Tabish had very little money.

As Tabish becomes a successful real-estate businessman and enters politics, he grows increasingly distant from Beena. Driven by ambition and a desire for greater political power, he falls in love with his educated secretary, Naz. He decides to marry Naz as his second wife, believing that the marriage will strengthen his political career. He convinces himself that he can keep both wives without considering Beena's feelings or seeking her consent.

Beena first learns about Tabish's intentions through gossip among the house helps. Confused and heartbroken, she visits her best friend, Shabina, and confides in her that she feels Tabish no longer loves her and fears that he may marry again. When Beena does not return home, everyone becomes worried and begins to suspect that she may have eloped. She eventually returns, reassuring everyone that her fears about Tabish's second marriage were merely a doubt.

However, Beena's worst fears are soon confirmed. On the day of Tabish's nikah with Naz, Beena quietly leaves Tabish's house early in the morning. Her sudden disappearance sends the family into a panic. Tabish and everyone around him desperately try to find her, but Beena is nowhere to be found.

== Cast ==
- Urwa Hocane as Beena
- Ahsan Khan as Tabish
- Saif Ali Khan as Behram
- Sania Saeed as Tabish's mother
- Noman Masood as Chaudhary Jabbar
- Alina Khan as Naaz
- Sardar Nabeel as Gohar
- Ayat Khan as Nasreen
- Irum Rahman as Beena's mother
- Omar Abdullah as Beena's brother
- Zubaria Jan as Shabina
- Uzma Mukhtar as Nazia
- Javairia as Shazia

== Production ==
For the role of female lead, actresses like Mahira Khan, Saba Qamar, Sarah Khan and Reema Khan for the older version of the character, were approached, however, Hocane was selected finally. The series marked fourth collaboration of Hocane and Khan after Meri Ladli, Marasim and Udaari.

The principal photography took place in Islamabad.

=== Broadcast ===
Aap Ki Izzat premiered on Hum TV on July 17, 2026. The serial aired its last episode on September 22 and was replaced by the network's previously broadcast Aangan at its timeslot.

== Reception ==
In a review of the first two episodes, Gaitee Ara Siddiqi of The News International noted the subtle messaging, praised Ahmed's dialogues and acting of all the actors, especially Hocane's performance. For The Friday Times, the reviewer praised the writing, direction, the portrayal of patriarchal mindset, dialogues and Hocane's performance.
