= International Pakistan Prestige Awards =

Pakistani entertainment awards ceremony

- Latest ceremony: 2023
- IPPA statuette
- Awarded for: Achievement in Pakistani film, television, music and fashion
- Location: Various international locations
- Country: Pakistan
- First award: 2017
- Website: ippaawards.pk

The International Pakistan Prestige Awards, commonly known as the IPPA Awards, are Pakistani entertainment awards presented for work in film, television, music and fashion. The awards were launched in 2017 and have been held outside Pakistan, including ceremonies in the United Kingdom, Norway and Turkey.

== History ==
IPPA was founded by Ali Malik of Vision Events International and Mukhtar Ahmed Chohan of Lollywood Entertainment. The first ceremony was held at the London Hilton on Park Lane in London in September 2017. According to IPPA, around 50 Pakistani entertainment figures, including nominees, guests, presenters, winners and performers, travelled from Karachi and Lahore to London for the ceremony. The inaugural ceremony drew criticism over its organisation and awards process. Actor Adnan Siddiqui later defended the ceremony, saying that Pakistani award shows abroad could give the entertainment industry exposure to foreign media.

The second ceremony was held at Indigo at The O2 in London in September 2018. In 2019, the awards were held at X Meeting Point in Oslo, Norway. The 2020 ceremony was cancelled during the COVID-19 pandemic.

The fourth ceremony was held at the Haliç Congress Center in Istanbul on 31 October 2021. It was attended by Pakistani and Turkish officials, actors, directors and producers. The fifth ceremony was held in Manchester in 2023, with nominations covering Pakistani film and television work from 2022.

== Ceremonies ==
Edition	Year	Venue	Location	Ref(s)
1st	2017	London Hilton on Park Lane	London, United Kingdom	
2nd	2018	Indigo at The O2	London, United Kingdom	
3rd	2019	X Meeting Point	Oslo, Norway	
4th	2021	Haliç Congress Center	Istanbul, Turkey	
5th	2023	Manchester Central Convention Complex	Manchester, United Kingdom	

== Winners and nominees ==
Winners are listed first and highlighted in bold.

=== 2017 ===
Category	Winner	Work	Ref(s)
Best Drama	Udaari		
Best Film	Actor in Law		
Best Actor	Ahsan Khan	Udaari	
Best Actress	Aisha Khan	Noor-e-Zindagi	
Best Director	Mohammed Ehteshamuddin	Udaari	
Best Supporting Actor	Gohar Rasheed	Mann Mayal	
Style Icon Male	Hamza Ali Abbasi		
Style Icon Female	Ayesha Omar		
Star of the Year Male	Humayun Saeed		
Star of the Year Female	Mawra Hocane		
Best Jodi Award – Drama	Farhan Saeed and Urwa Hocane	Udaari	
Outstanding Achievement by a Pakistani Actor on a Global Platform – Male	Adnan Siddiqui		
Outstanding Achievement by a Pakistani Actor on a Global Platform – Female	Humaima Malik		
Legend Award	Javed Sheikh		
Best Singer	Rahat Fateh Ali Khan		
Best Model	Neha Ahmed		
Best Designer Couture	Faraz Manan		

=== 2018 ===
Category	Winner	Work	Ref(s)
Best Film	Punjab Nahi Jaungi		
Best Actress Film	Mehwish Hayat	Punjab Nahi Jaungi	
Best Actor Film	Humayun Saeed	Punjab Nahi Jaungi	
Best Jodi Film	Osman Khalid Butt and Ainy Jaffri	Balu Mahi	
Best Director Film	Nadeem Baig	Punjab Nahi Jaungi	
Best Supporting Actor Film	Urwa Hocane		
Best Singer of the Year	Shiraz Uppal		
Best TV Serial – Jury	Baaghi		
Best TV Serial – Viewers' Choice	Yaqeen Ka Safar		
Best Actor Female TV Serial – Viewers' Choice	Saba Qamar		
Best Actor Female TV Serial – Jury	Sajal Aly		
Best Actor Male TV Serial – Viewers' Choice	Mikaal Zulfiqar		
Best Actor Male TV Serial – Jury	Adnan Siddiqui		
Best Director TV Serial	Syed Ali Raza Usama	Khuda Aur Muhabbat	
Best Jodi TV Serial	Ahad Raza Mir and Sajal Aly		
IPPA Style Icon of the Year	Sonya Hussyn		
IPPA Star of the Year Female	Sajal Aly		
Lifetime Achievement	Sultana Siddiqui		

=== 2021 ===
Category	Winner	Work	Ref(s)
Best Actor Male in Film	**Osman Khalid Butt**		
Best TV Presenter of the Year	**Ahsan Khan**		
Best Supporting Actor in Film	**Zara Noor Abbas**		

=== 2023 ===
==== Film ====
Best Film	Best Director Film
**London Nahi Jaunga**; Quaid-e-Azam Zindabad; Dum Mastam; Tich Button; Ghabrana Nahi Hai	**Mohammed Ehteshamuddin – Dum Mastam**; Nabeel Qureshi – Quaid-e-Azam Zindabad; Nadeem Baig – London Nahi Jaunga; Qasim Ali Mureed – Tich Button; Saqib Khan – Ghabrana Nahi Hai
Best Actor Male Film	Best Actor Female Film
**Humayun Saeed – London Nahi Jaunga**; Fahad Mustafa – Quaid-e-Azam Zindabad; Imran Ashraf – Dum Mastam; Farhan Saeed – Tich Button; Syed Jibran – Ghabrana Nahi Hai	**Mehwish Hayat – London Nahi Jaunga**; Mahira Khan – Quaid-e-Azam Zindabad; Amar Khan – Dum Mastam; Iman Ali and Sonya Hussyn – Tich Button; Saba Qamar – Ghabrana Nahi Hai
Best Supporting Role Male/Female Film
**Sohail Ahmed – London Nahi Jaunga**; Javed Sheikh – Quaid-e-Azam Zindabad; Gohar Rasheed and Sohail Ahmed – London Nahi Jaunga; Saleem Mairaj – Dum Mastam; Sohail Ahmed – Tich Button; Saleem Mairaj – Ghabrana Nahi Hai

==== Television ====
Best Drama	Best Director TV Serial
**Sinf-e-Aahan**; Mere Humnasheen; Sang-e-Mah; Aik Thi Laila; Ishq-e-Laa	**Saife Hassan – Sang-e-Mah**; Nadeem Baig – Sinf-e-Aahan; Ali Faizan – Mere Humnasheen; Yasir Hussain – Aik Thi Laila; Amin Iqbal – Ishq-e-Laa
Best Actor Male TV Serial	Best Actor Female TV Serial
**Ahsan Khan – Mere Humnasheen**; Sheheryar Munawar – Sinf-e-Aahan; Atif Aslam – Sang-e-Mah; Yasir Hussain – Aik Thi Laila; Azaan Sami Khan – Ishq-e-Laa	**Hania Amir – Sang-e-Mah**; Sajal Aly and Yumna Zaidi – Sinf-e-Aahan; Hiba Bukhari – Mere Humnasheen; Hania Aamir and Kubra Khan – Sang-e-Mah; Iqra Aziz – Aik Thi Laila; Yumna Zaidi – Ishq-e-Laa
Best Supporting Actor TV Serial	Best On-screen Couple TV Serial
**Samiya Mumtaz – Sang-e-Mah**; Saba Hamid and Ramsha Kanwal – Sinf-e-Aahan; Syed Jibran – Mere Humnasheen; Samiya Mumtaz and Sania Saeed – Sang-e-Mah; Faysal Quraishi – Aik Thi Laila; Adnan Samad Khan – Ishq-e-Laa	**Ahsan Khan and Hiba Bukhari – Mere Humnasheen**; Azaan Sami Khan and Yumna Zaidi – Ishq-e-Laa; Zaviyar Nauman Ijaz and Hania Aamir – Sang-e-Mah; Atif Aslam and Kubra Khan – Sang-e-Mah; Iqra Aziz and Yasir Hussain – Aik Thi Laila

== Reception and criticism ==
IPPA has been discussed in relation to the wider practice of holding Pakistani entertainment award ceremonies outside Pakistan. Founder Ali Malik said the awards faced criticism in their early years but had become more organised over time.

The awards have also attracted criticism over their organisation and awards process. The inaugural ceremony in 2017 was criticised for being unfamiliar to many invitees before the event and for presenting a large number of awards to attendees. In 2021, the Istanbul ceremony drew controversy after model Fatima Hasan alleged that she was asked to leave the red carpet because her outfit was considered too revealing, despite having shared it with the production team beforehand.

== See also ==
- Lux Style Awards
- Hum Awards
- ARY Film Awards
- Pakistan International Screen Awards
