= Marasim =

- Genre: Romance; Drama
- Written by: Zanjabeel Asim Shah
- Directed by: Owais Khan
- Starring: Ahsan Khan; Sonya Hussyn; Urwa Hocane; Saba Hameed
- Opening theme: "Silsile Tod Gaya" performed by Humaira Channa
- Country of origin: Pakistan
- Original language: Urdu
- No. of episodes: 19

Production
- Executive producers: Nadeem Baig; Sadia Jabbar
- Producers: Humayun Saeed; Shahzad Nasib
- Production location: Karachi
- Cinematography: Qasim Ali Mureed
- Production company: Six Sigma Plus

Original release
- Network: A-Plus TV
- Release: 1 January 2014 – August 2014

Marasim (Urdu: مراسم, lit. 'Connections') is a Pakistani television serial aired on A-Plus TV in 2014. It is produced by Humayun Saeed and Shahzad Nasib under Six Sigma Plus. It has Urwa Hocane, Ahsan Khan, Sonya Hussyn and Saba Hameed in lead roles.

== Plot ==
Dawood and Momina are cousins who love each other and wish to get married. However, their relationship falls prey to the bitterness and enmity between their respective mothers, Geti Ara and Sheher Bano. Dawood is forced to marry Nayab, a girl from an underprivileged family, chosen by Geti Ara. Meanwhile, Momina marries her cousin, Fahad, and moves to Australia. Despite their marriages, Dawood and Momina are unable to forget each other or wholeheartedly accept their respective partners.

Dawood, however, tries to fulfill his responsibilities as a husband by treating Nayab with respect and providing her with everything she needs. The couple eventually becomes the parents of a son, Hunain.

Things take a turn when Momina returns to Pakistan for a visit, and she and Dawood attempt to reunite. Dawood discusses the possibility of marrying Momina with Geti Ara, who supports his decision because she is not entirely satisfied with Nayab. Meanwhile, Dawood and Momina discover that he has terminal cancer and only a short time left to live.

Sheher Bano refuses to let her end her marriage to Fahad and marry Dawood, especially after learning that he has only a few months to live. Fahad returns from Australia and takes Momina back with him after reconciling with her. Dawood, too, has no choice but to reconcile with Nayab and accept his circumstances.

He tries to spend as much time as possible with his wife, mother, and son. He also teaches Nayab how to manage his office work so that she can take over his business after his death. With Dawood's guidance, Nayab successfully learns to manage the business.

Before leaving for the hospital, Dawood apologizes to Geti Ara. Shortly afterward, she receives a call from the hospital informing her that he has died of cancer, a condition he had kept hidden from his family. She brings his body home, where Nayab is devastated to see her husband dead.

== Cast ==
- Ahsan Khan as Dawood
- Urwa Hocane as Nayab
- Saba Hameed as Geti Ara
- Soniya Hussain as Momina
- Zaheen Tahira as Durdana
- Sajid Shah as Imdad
- Sadia Faisal as Deeba
- Naila Jaffri as Sheher Bano
- Furqan Qureshi as Abdullah
- Hajra Khan as Almas
- Badar Khalil aas Dadi (cameo)

== Soundtrack ==
The OST title song (Silsile Tod Gaya) of Marasim drama is sung by Humera Channa and composed by Waqar Ali.

== Production ==
It marked Ahsan Khan’s first on-screen collaboration with Sonya Hussyn, with whom he later appeared in Haasil and Aangan. It also marked his second on-screen collaboration with Urwa Hocane, following Meri Ladli. The two later reunited in Udaari and Aap Ki Izzat.

== Reception ==
In an year-ender poll conducted by the Dawn, Marasim was voted for Best drama serial critics' choice, Best writer critics' choice, Best director critics' choice, Best actor critics' choice for Ahsan Khan, Best actress critics' choice for Saba Hameed, and Best camera work critics' choice.

=== Awards and nominations ===
Year	Awards	Category	Nominee	Result	Ref.
2015	Lux Style Awards	Best TV Play	Marasim	Nominated	
2015	Lux Style Awards	Best Television Writer	Zanjabeel Asim Shah	Nominated	
