= Hadiqa Kiani =

Pakistani singer and actress

Hadiqa Kiani SI TI
- حدیقہ کیانی
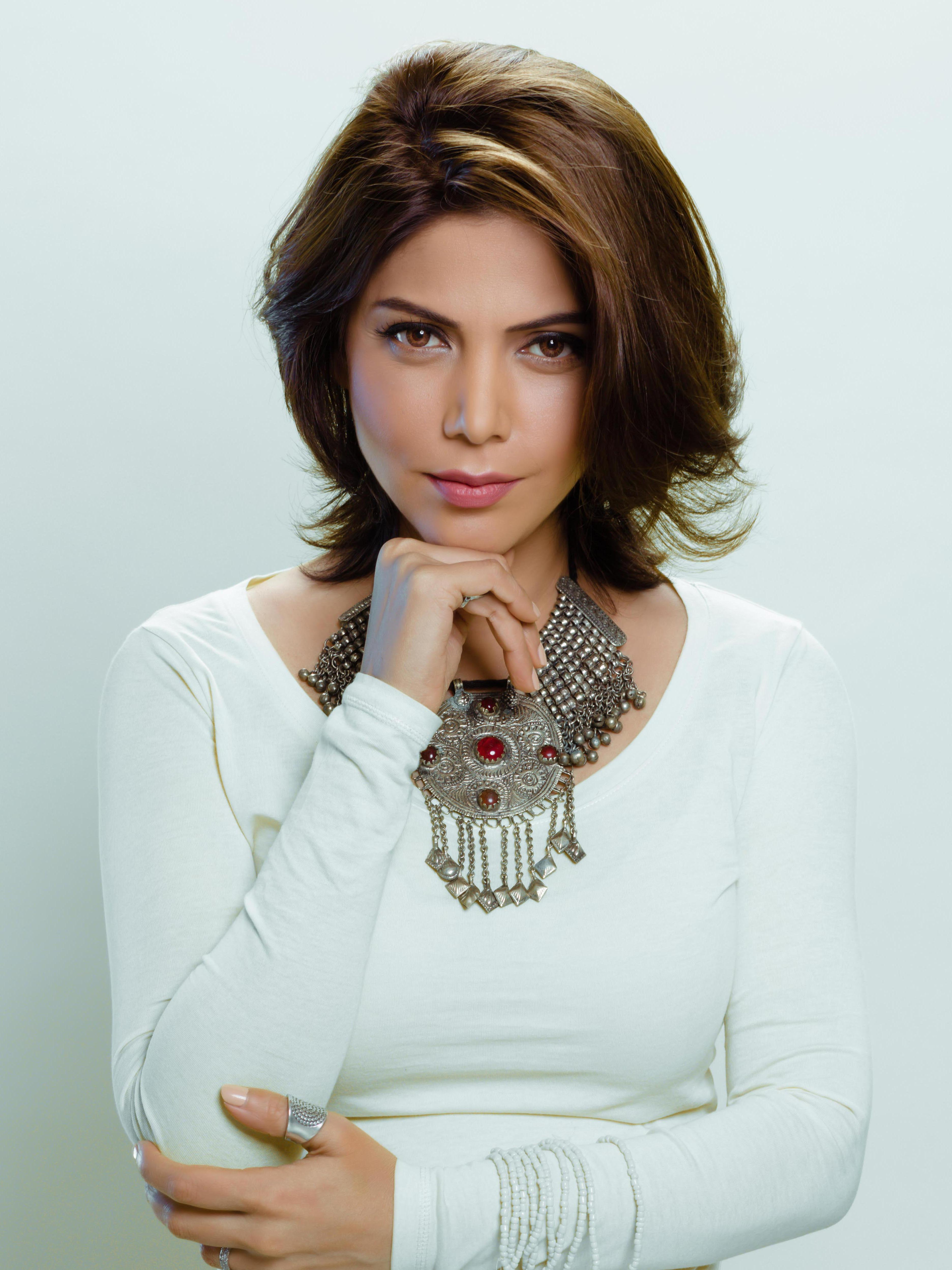
- Hadiqa Kiani, 2016
- Born: 11 August 1972 (age 54); Rawalpindi, Punjab, Pakistan
- Occupations: Singer; Songwriter; Actress; Television presenter; Philanthropist
- Years active: 1995–present
- Musical career
- Genres: Pop; folk
- Instrument: Vocals
- Labels: Sound Master; Lips Music; Fire Records (Pakistan); Hi-tech Music; Coke Studio Pakistan

Hadiqa Kiani (born 11 August 1972) is a Pakistani singer, songwriter, guitarist, actress, and social worker. Along with Urdu and Punjabi, she has also sung songs in various local and international languages. She has won several national and international awards.

Hadiqa has also performed at venues such as the Royal Albert Hall in the UK and The Kennedy Center in the USA.

== Early life and career ==
Kiani was born on 11 August 1972 to a Gakhar family in Rawalpindi as the youngest of three siblings. She has an older brother (Irfan Kiani) and a sister (Sasha). Her father died when she was three years old. Her mother, poet Khawar Kiani, was the principal of a government girls' school. Seeing her musical ability, Khawar enlisted Kiani in the Pakistan National Council of the Arts. She received early education in music from her teacher, Nargis Naheed.

While studying at Viqar-un-Nisa Noon Girls High School, Kiani represented Pakistan at international children festivals in Turkey, Jordan, Bulgaria, and Greece, winning various medals. Kiani was also a part of Sohail Rana's children's program Rang Barangi Dunya, a weekly musical on PTV.

As an eighth grader, Kiani moved from her birthplace Rawalpindi to Lahore, where she continued her classical training by Ustad Faiz Ahmed Khan and Wajid Ali Nashad. Kiani went on to graduate with a bachelor's degree in psychology from Kinnaird College for Women University and a Masters in Psychology from the Government College University in Lahore.

In the early 1990s, Kiani hosted a children's TV music program called Angan Angan Taray. In the 3 1/2-year-long run, she had sung over one thousand songs for children while hosting the show alongside the music composer Amjad Bobby and then with music composer Khalil Ahmed. Owing to the number of songs Kiani sang during this program, she was presented with the title of "A+ artist" on behalf of PTV, joining the likes of Noor Jehan, Naheed Akhtar, and Mehnaz. Kiani also appeared as a VJ for a music charts program called Video Junction on NTM.

== Albums ==
=== 1995: Raaz ===
The following year, Kiani released her debut album Raaz (Secret) in 1996. The album spawned a string of radio-friendly hits and received positive reviews. Some argue that the reason the album did well was because it was not common for female singers (from educated/non-musical backgrounds) to release albums in Pakistan. Also, she was the first female singer to release a pop album after the former pop singer Nazia Hassan gave up her musical career. Kiani's ability to sing in other dialects was also presented to the country through the hit folk song "Maane Di Mauj" featuring Kashmiri tunes.

Her increasing popularity was further highlighted in January 1997, when Kiani became the first Asian singer to perform at the British National Lottery Live on BBC One (a program with an estimated viewership 16.6 million at that time). Afterwards she worked on two more shows with Bally Sagoo for BBC and ITV before going on her first U.S. tour in 1997. Her U.S. tour covered 15 states and a few cities in Canada. The same year Kiani performed many other international events in the United Kingdom, Australia, and China. By the summer of 1997, Kiani was representing Pakistan as the only Pakistani singer to perform at "Celebration Hong Kong 97" at Happy Valley Race Course, an event to celebrate Hong Kong's freedom from the United Kingdom. Kiani performed alongside other International singers like Lisa Stansfield, Wet Wet Wet, Michael Learns to Rock, All 4 One and The Brand New Heavies.

By the end of the year she became the first Asian female singer ever to be signed by Pepsi Cola International.

=== 1998: Roshni ===
In 1998, Kiani recorded the official theme song for the 1999 Cricket World Cup. The Pepsi-sponsored song was titled "Intehai Shauq", written by Kiani's mother, Khawar Kiani, and composed and produced by the famed Nizar Lalani. The song was filmed by Jami and Imran Baber.

Whilst recording "Intehai Shauq", Kiani released her second album, titled Roshni. The third single from the album was "Dupatta". The video was inspired by the sci-fi film The Matrix. Nadeem F. Paracha listed the song as number 15 in his article "The Twenty Best Pop Songs Ever". Paracha attributed the success of the song to its quasi-bhangra rhythm with "fat, funky techno beats" and Kiani's "dreamy-meets-husky vocals" which made the results "stunning".

Capitalizing on the success of "Dupatta", Kiani went on to release two other hits, "Roshni" and "Woh Kaun Hai". Her sixth single of the album, "Boohey Barian", became an even bigger hit for her than "Dupatta". To date, "Boohey Barian" is widely accepted as Kiani's best single, and it is noted as being a prominent Pakistani song. It was filmed in 1998 at the Haveli Barood Khana in Lahore.

The Roshni album sold over a million copies in Pakistan alone, certifying it as platinum. The album is listed in "The 20 Best Local Pop Albums Ever" for the country, positioned at No. 15. Kiani is just one of two female singers in the entire list.

Kiani's success led to her being signed by Unilever for celebrity endorsement of Lipton in 2001. In 2002, she was signed again by Unilever for Sunsilk Shampoo after the results of Unilever's national survey to find the "Most Popular Woman of Pakistan".

=== 2002: Rung ===
Kiani released her third album Rung in September 2002. She returned to promote the album in June 2003, almost 10 months after she'd released "Yaad Sajan" with a new single "Ranjhan" and several stage performances and tours around the country. She then released other singles off the album throughout 2003 and 2004. These included "Jogi Bun Kay Aa", "Mahi", and "Dholan". In "Jogi Bun Kay Aa", Kiani plays various women's roles, including a traditional Japanese, an Arab, and a tribal woman. She played a vampire in her video for "Mahi" which was directed by top director Asim Raza. The video showed that it is harmful to judge people of different faiths and castes and also bad to stereotype. It was the highest budgeted video of the year 2003. During this time, Kiani was in the midst of her first divorce, however Kiani's album sales continued to pick up through 2003 and 2004. In 2004, she received the Best Female Pop Singer Award by Indus Music, the first 24-hour music channel of Pakistan. Asim Raza won an award for best video for directing her critically acclaimed video Mahi.

Shortly after the release of Rung, Kiani was mentioned in "Pakistani Pop's 10 most Influential Acts Ever", in which she was ranked ninth. She is also one of just two female singers in the list, the other being Nazia Hassan. A UK-based Magazine declared Kiani the 22nd greatest music maker of South Asia out of a total of fifty artists, also mentioning how she raised the standard of music videos in the country.

Several years after the release of Rung, leading Indian Sufi singer "Harshdeep Kaur" covered Kiani's self composed "Jogi Bun Kay Aa" on a leading Indian television show.

=== 2007: Rough Cut ===
In 2007, Kiani released her fourth studio album, Rough Cut, a collaboration with Aamir Zaki. With the release of Rough Cut, Kiani became the first mainstream Pakistani artist to release an album completely in English.

Prior to the release of the album, Kiani and Zaki teamed up for an Urdu song, written by Zaki, titled "Iss Baar Milo." The video was directed by Jami (director) and starred Humayun Saeed opposite of Kiani. "Iss Baar Milo's" video production and acting performances, notably Kiani's portrayal of a "schizophrenic" patient in a Pakistani mental hospital received a great response.

In April 2007, Kiani released the first official single for the album, titled "Living This Lie". The same week, Kiani was named "Hotstepper of the week" for The News by Jang Group. The article also stated that ultimately, "as long as Hadiqa is around, there is still hope for women in the patriarchal music world of Pakistan."

"Living This Lie" was nominated and won for "Best English Song" at "The Musik Awards" in 2007. Kiani was also nominated for Best Female Singer in the same award show.

=== 2009: Aasmaan ===
The first single of the album was "Sohnya". The official video of "Sohnya" premiered a day before Kiani released the album. Following the release, the song+video stayed on the "Aag top 10 Charts" for over a month resulting in Kiani receiving a Shield from Aag10 for being the Artist of the Month.

The album itself stayed Number One on the Vibes Charts of INSTEP Magazine for the entire year. By the end of 2009, Aasmaan was named the Best Album of 2009 according to sales volume, popularity and internet downloads.

Every single released from Aasmaan reached number one. "Sohnya" was number one AAG10 Charts for over a month and was titled the best Pop Song of 2009 according to The Nation. "Tuk Tuk" was number one on Prime TV Charts. "Az Chashme Saqi" went number one on PlayTv Charts and by the end of 2009, it was declared the third best music video of 2009.

In February 2010, Kiani released "Janan", for which she collaborated with relatively unknown Pashto singer Irfan Khan. The song has become Kiani's biggest hit till date and some say that it has even topped the popularity of "Boohey Barian". The song became the first Pakistani pop song to be mentioned by the Los Angeles Times, where the newspaper said that "Janan" was what the whole country was listening to. Kiani's rendering in the Pashto language was critically acclaimed. Some Pakhtoons even started to call her "Hadiqa Pathani", Kiani is credited with bringing back a trend in Pakistan of embracing Pashto culture, girls started to wear Pashto style dresses imitating Kiani's looks on the red carpet and more mainstream singers began singing in the local language. The song's widespread popularity was credited to the fact that it broke barriers in Pakistani music. Kiani being a Punjabi, singing a Pashto song and appealing to not only Pakistani Pashto audiences, but to audiences worldwide. Kiani's "Janan" has been covered by many international singers, most noticeably by the Chinese singer Hou Wei at the grand South Asia Expo in 2014. The Chinese cover was done as a tribute to Pakistani culture which elevated the Pashto community in Pakistan while, what many say, cementing the song as a national treasure

=== 2017: WAJD ===
In 2017, Kiani teamed up with her brother to launch the visual album titled "Wajd." The album consisting of five renderings of folk songs was critically acclaimed and led Kiani to receive her first "Album of the Year" award from the Lux Style Awards 2018.

Kiani's distinct wardrobe during this album's era were noted by the press and led her to win "Most Stylish Singer" at the Hum Style Awards 2018. Her style led her to be the muse for high street brands such as Generation and Bonanza and couturiers like Ali Xeeshan.

=== 2022: VASL ===
In 2022, Kiani released her album titled VASL. The album reproduced songs from Kiani's first studio album titled Raaz. The album saw three singles, each receiving critical acclaim. The album received international recognition when global streaming giant Spotify acknowledged the album as a part of their Equal Platform, presenting Kiani with her own appearance on a Times Square billboard in New York City.

== Playback singing and musical contributions ==
In 2006, Kiani was featured on UK based producer Khiza's album "Loyal To The Game"'s lead single, "Mehr Ma". The song was an instant success in Pakistan, and was seen as a great return to pop music for Kiani after her ballads in Rung. In the video, Kiani was seen with different hairstyles and outfits. The reviews for the song were favorable, one source said that ""Mehr Ma", which starts off the album, is easily the best track on it. With Kiani showcasing her top-notch vocals and the music, which remains hip-hopish yet very desi, thanks to the usage of sitar, tabla makes it an excellent number." Kiani also performed the song at the 2006 Lux Style Awards.

Over the years, Kiani has provided vocals for a select list of TV Dramas such as the critically acclaimed 2011 Drama Zindagi Gulzar Hai's title track with Ali Zafar and the 2006 "Aas Pass" with Atif Aslam.

In May 2012, Kiani appeared on the 5th season of Rohail Hyatt's Coke Studio. Performing renditions of Bulleh Shah and Amir Khusro to positive reviews.

In 2016, Kiani lent her voice to the character of Meeran, portrayed by Urwa Hocane, on the Hum TV drama "Udaari." The title track of the drama was sung by Kiani, featuring Farhan Saeed and production by Sahir Ali Bagga. The title track topped the music charts while the drama was critically acclaimed and an instant hit for viewers. The drama was a first for Pakistani television, tackling the taboo issues of sexual abuse and women's rights in the conservative country. It was faced with a notice from PEMRA, for the portrayal of "unethical" scenes.

In 2018, Kiani joined the cast of 3 Bahadur: Rise of the Warriors for the title song. The animated film was produced and directed by Pakistan's first Academy Award winner Sharmeen Obaid-Chinoy.

In 2023, Kiani released a cover of Nusrat Fateh Ali Khan's classic qawwali "Jani Door Gaye". The track was widely praised for its emotional depth and Kiani's powerful vocals.

== Filmography ==
=== Films ===
Year	Title	Role	Notes
2011	Bol	Herself	Special appearance in the song "Hona Tha Pyaar" with Atif Aslam

=== Television ===
Year	Title	Role	Notes
2012	Sur Kshetra	Jury member	Guest
2013–2014	Pakistan Idol	Judge	
2016	Udaari	as a Judge of competition	Special appearance
2019–20	Aap Kay Sitaray	Host	Talk show
2021	Raqeeb Se	Sakina	Lead
2021–22	Dobaara	Mehrunnisa	Lead
2022	Pinjra	Khadija	Lead
2023	Hadsa	Taskeen	Lead

== Notable performances ==
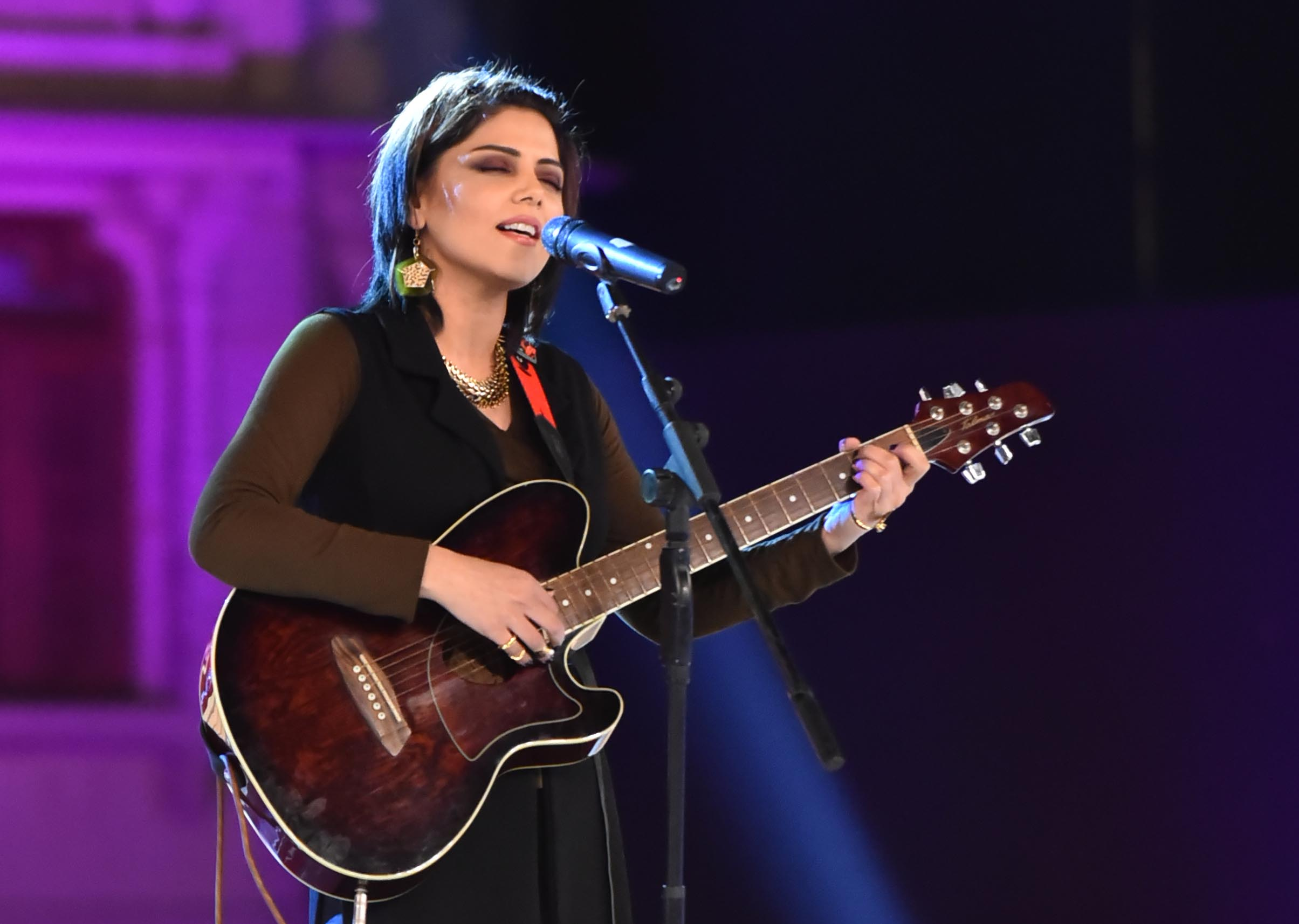
Kiani performing live at Mohatta Palace in 2016

On 11 August 2005, Kiani performed in Nagoya for the Prime Minister of Japan Mr. Junichirō Koizumi . Kiani then performed in Toronto on 14 August 2005 by request of The Pakistani Consulate. She performed in Houston on 13 August 2005. The show was at Sam Houston Race Park, and it was attended by over 15000 people. Chief guest of the show was Sheila Jackson Lee who is a member of the US House of Representatives. In the same month, she performed at the Mets Shea Stadium New York on 18 August 2005. She closed the month of August with a performance at the Pakistan Parade in New York on 28 August 2005.

Kiani represented Pakistan on the 25th Anniversary of the Organization of Islamic Conference (OIC) Research Centre for Islamic History, Art and Culture (IRCICA) in Turkey. Islamic Countries such as Azerbaijan, U.A.E, Iran, Qatar, Kazakhstan, Kyrgyz Republic, Kuwait, Lebanon, Egypt, Sudan, Syria, Saudi Arabia, Tanzania, Turkey, Pakistan and Yemen took part in the celebrations. The event was organised by Istanbul Metropolitan Municipality. She performed at the AKM Opera House on 23 November 2005. Among the audience were musicians from various countries. The biggest surprise for the audience was said to be when Kiani sang "Sanalama" (Turkish song of Living Legend "Sezen Aksu"). She told the audience that as Turkey stood beside Pakistan in good and bad times, she wanted to convey the love of Pakistani people for the Turks. She also told the audience that she visited Turkey as a child star in 80s and represented Pakistan in the International Children's Festival in Turkey so she had beautiful childhood memories associated with Turkey. The audience gave her a standing ovation at the end of her performance, The Mayor of Istanbul appreciated her and presented a bouquet of flowers to her. After her performance she received invitations to participate in the upcoming Art festivals in various countries such as Iran, Syria, Qatar and Lebanon. During her stay in Istanbul she officially visited various historical sites in Turkey and conveyed the love of Pakistan for Turkey. Her performance in Istanbul made headlines in various Turkish Newspapers.

Kiani performed in China for the Chinese Premier on 21 February 2006. The following month, she performed for President George W. Bush on 4 March 2006. Commenting on her performance, Bush said "Ms. Hadiqa Kiani is extremely talented and should sing here (United States) more." She then performed for the Crown Prince of Brunei Al-Muhtadee Billah Bolkiah on 29 May 2006.

Kiani performed as per the request of former First Lady of the United States, Laura Bush on 21 September 2006 at The Kennedy Center, in Washington, D.C. She closed the year by performing for Prince Charles of the United Kingdom and Camilla, Duchess of Cornwall on 30 October 2006, and again in China for the Chinese president on 23 November 2006.

On 19 May 2007, Kiani performed at Dead Sea in Jordan for 28 Heads of States at the World Economic Forum on the Middle East and North Africa. Her performance took place on the second day of the three-day event while American singer Lionel Richie performed the first day. Among Kiani's setlist for the night was the Arabic song titled "Ah W Nos" by Nancy Ajram which Kiani covered and then sang again the following year in Pakistan.

In August 2007, Kiani was one of the headliners for the London Day Parade at Trafalgar Square, London which was broadcast by Geo TV to celebrate 60 years of Independence for Pakistan. Kiani was the only singer who sang completely live that day. She was also part of closing the show with the popular patriotic song "Jeevay Pakistan" alongside Ali Zafar.

Kiani has continued performing throughout Pakistan for various companies, including Pepsi and Samsung. Most notably, in 2016 Kiani performed to positive reviews at the first Inter Provincial Games in Pakistan, initiated by President Mamnoon Hussain as a sporting event to support the male and female athletes of Pakistan.

At the end of 2016, upon the Turkish President Erdoğan's arrival to Pakistan, Kiani was invited to perform at the historic Lahore Fort, performing along with folk legend Arif Lohar to welcome the world leader. Kiani's performance was noted as "enthralling" and "melodious."

In 2022, Kiani took the stage at Expo 2020 Dubai at the DEC Arena to represent Pakistan to a sold-out crowd. Gulf Business noted Kiani's performance as a musical highlight of the Expo. Kiani was presented with a tour of the Pakistan Pavilion at the world event in which she was quoted as saying, "It's about time that we need to show the world who we are and where we are heading. We are people full of love and we have our rich cultural background and people need to see that."

== Philanthropy and social causes ==
In March 2007, Kiani was one of the many artists featured in a widely popular track called "Yeh Hum Naheen". In this song, various Pakistani artists joined to send out a message that the stereotype of Pakistanis is not correct and that they oppose terrorism. The song also conveys an anti-terrorism sentiment in the music video and supported the anti-terrorism campaign, Yeh hum naheen, which Kiani is heavily involved with. Other artists in the song include Ali Zafar, Shafqat Amanat Ali and the Strings duo. The song was picked up by international networks such as Fox News and BBC and amassed a significant number of downloads.

In August 2010, Kiani and her siblings worked with local Pakistanis along with the Pakistan Army to provide clothing, water, food and shelter to the flood victims of Pakistan following the devastating 2010 Pakistan floods. Kiani also appeared in Geo TV's telethon "Pukaar" along with Pop star Ali Zafar to appeal for donations. In collaboration with Pakistan Army, Kiani made visits to Multan Relief Camp, Basti Kalraywala, Muzaffarabad and other flood hit areas, personally distributing goods to the affectees.

On 8 November 2010, Kiani was appointed United Nations Development Programme Goodwill ambassador after being recognized for her individual philanthropic efforts. Following being appointed, Kiani continued to construct housing facilities in Nowshera, Khyber Pakhtunkhwa for the flood victims till she completed over 250 houses. Nowshera was one of the worst flood hit areas in the country.

In the beginning of 2015, Kiani was chosen on to be one of Pond's Miracle Mentors as an initiative to highlight and support strong women in the patriarchal Pakistani society alongside nine other renowned and influential women. Later that month Kiani stood up again to voice her views on women in leadership at the Women Leadership Summit 2015 with then wife of former cricketer Imran Khan, Reham Khan and various other women who had achieved success in their respective fields including Muniba Mazari and Nadia Jamil. The summit brought international and local voices together as an act towards shedding light to the issue of gender discrimination in the workplace.

Kiani works regularly with the Edhi Foundation and has been involved with many other charitable organizations, including Muslim Hands, SOS Villages and UNICEF. She has also campaigned and been the ambassador for Shaukat Khanum, Oxfam International, and since 2010 the United Nations.

Kiani has also participated in fundraising initiatives with Aghosh UK, an initiative of Alkhidmat Foundation in 2026, supporting orphan care programmes for children in Pakistan. In 2026, she took part in a UK fundraising tour organised to raise awareness and support for orphan care initiatives.

In November 2015 it was announced that Kiani would speak at TEDxKinnaird on the role of women in Pakistani society.

After taking a stance with the award-winning project, Udaari that highlighted the social issue of sexual abuse against children in the Pakistani community in 2016, Kiani took a stance against the issue again in 2017. Kiani gained attention when criticizing actor Yasir Hussain at the 5th annual Hum TV Awards for joking about child molestation. In a statement on social media, Kiani stated that the comments made by Hussain were "disgusting," while also taking a stance against the entertainment industry for supporting the actor.

In July 2017, Kiani teamed up with Nestlé to introduce socially responsible initiatives in Pakistan regarding early childhood development.

In August 2022, Kiani launched her project titled Vaseela-e-Raah to aid victims of the 2022 Pakistan floods in Balochistan and in South Punjab. Kiani led her humanitarian efforts through the flood relief campaign and provided food, tents and medical supplies including anti-snake venoms in flood-affected areas. The campaign's social media updated the list of items needed for flood relief efforts, including waterproof tents, charpai (beds), and mosquito nets as half a million people in Pakistan were homeless by the floods impact. According to Gulf News, Kiani sent dozens of trucks with supplies to the impacted regions, supplies that were collected and packaged by Hadiqa and her team based in Lahore.

Kiani continued visiting the affected regions in the provinces of Balochistan and Punjab providing comfort and relief to the victims of climate disaster. "I am doing this as a Pakistani citizen, not as a politician, not for votes or anything else. This is my civic duty, this is your civic duty. Do your part" she stressed.

By 1 March 2023, Kiani had completed the construction of 100 homes, one maternity center, one primary school and one grocery store in Tamboo Tehsil, Naseerabad district, Balochistan.

28 September 2023, Kiani shared via social media that she had completed the construction of 370 homes, 2 mosques, 1 maternity center and 1 grocery store in the Tamboo and Kundi village districts of the flood effected regions of Naseerabad, Balochistan. Surpassing Kiani's original goal of 200 homes. In the same post, Kiani announced that all funds from the campaign were utilized with transparency and the campaign is no longer accepting any donations. As of September 2023, Kiani is advocating for clean water plants and solar panels for sustainable recovery in the region.

== Pakistan Idol ==
Pakistan Idol is a Pakistani reality singing competition that is part of the Idols franchise created by Simon Fuller and owned by 19 Entertainment and FremantleMedia. It is the 50th adaptation of the familiar reality competition format introduced in the British series Pop Idol in 2001. It was developed for the Pakistani entertainment market by Geo TV. The show brought together Junoon front man Ali Azmat, comic Bushra Ansari, and Kiani as judges.

== Acting career ==
In 2021, Kiani made her acting debut alongside Nauman Ijaz, Sania Saeed and Iqra Aziz in Hum TV's drama Raqeeb Se. The drama was written by Bee Gul and directed by Kashif Nisar while Kiani sang and produced the OST written by her mother, Khawar Kiani. Kiani starred as the protagonist in the drama, portraying a battered mother named Sakina, and won critical praise for the performance. The drama garnered Kiani her first awards in the acting field and was noted as one of "The Best Dramas of 2021". In 2022, Kiani was awarded with Lux Style Award for Best TV Actress - Critics' choice and Best Emerging Talent in TV at the 21st Lux Style Awards for her performance in the series.

Kiani's second drama premiered in October 2021 and paired Kiani with Bilal Abbas Khan. The drama was written by Sarwat Nazir directed by Danish Nawaz and produced by Momina Duraid Productions for Hum TV. DAWN Images wrote that the drama was an "attempt at redefining the 'leading lady' in Pakistani dramas". The drama received critical praise for its storyline and for Kiani's performance as Mehru. Dobara consistently topped the ratings charts and was noted of having an all-time high of 8.8 TRP rating in February 2021.

In December 2021, Kiani signed her third script for ARY Digital titled "Pinjra." The script was the last script written by Asma Nabeel who lost her life to breast cancer in early 2021. The drama is produced by Shazia Wajahat and Wajahat Rauf and was on-aired in 2022.

Her most recent drama titled "Hadsa" (2023) follows the story of an unfortunate yet strong woman named Taskeen who was living a happy life until a sudden tragedy hit her life. The broadcasting of this drama on Geo TV got halted due to some controversies surrounding the drama but the ban lifted afterwards, and it is currently being on-aired on Geo TV again.

== Recognition and Legacy ==
In March 2006, Kiani was presented with the Tamgha-e-Imtiaz by the Government of Pakistan, one of the highest civil awards of the country, in acknowledgement of her services in the field of music and for shining an encouraging light on the country for over a decade. The award was announced on 14 August 2005 but the ceremony was performed on 23 March of the next year. In 2015, Kiani was declared as one of "Pakistan's Most Powerful and Influential Women" of all time by The News International under the Jang Group umbrella.

On 15 August 2015, Daily Times named Kiani as the 15th of their 30 figures' list of celebrated Pakistanis who have brought a great deal of pride for their country, other names on the list titled "Pride of Pakistan" included Academy Award winner Sharmeen Obaid-Chinoy, Malala Yousafzai, and national hero Abdul Sattar Edhi.

In April 2015, Kiani headlined the Music Mela and introduced her new Qawwali sound at the 3-day festival arranged by the U.S. Embassy in Islamabad. The "Pop Queen" of Pakistan debuted herself as a Qawwali artist to positive feedback Upon the end of the Mela, Kiani announced that she would be working on her sixth studio album titled Wajd.

In December 2021, Kiani was listed as one of the Top Global Asian Celebrities by Eastern Eye, a UK publication. Kiani joined the list with Riz Ahmed, Mindy Kaling and Atif Aslam.

In May 2022, Hadiqa Kiani was featured on a digital billboard in Times Square in New York City as part of a promotional campaign by Spotify supporting her seventh studio album, ''Vasl''. In a statement accompanying the campaign, Spotify highlighted Kiani's three-decade career in the Pakistani music industry and noted her performances in multiple languages, including several regional languages of Pakistan as well as international languages such as Mandarin Chinese and French. The platform also recognized her contributions to Pakistani music and her influence as a female artist.

In 2023, Kiani made Dawn Images' 'IT LIST' for her contributions to music, television and philanthropy.

Kiani continues to serve as a role model for young women in Pakistan, artists Arooj Aftab,Shae Gill and Momina Mustehsan have cited Kiani as an inspiration for their musical ambitions and praised her artistry.

In December 2024, Hadiqa Kiani was included on the BBC's 100 Women list. The list recognized 100 women BBC deemed "inspiring and influential" from around the world. Kiani was included for her contributions to pop music and her dedication to philanthropic efforts during the 2022 floods.

On May 13, 2026, Hadiqa Kiani was conferred with the Sitara-e-Imtiaz, one of Pakistan’s highest civilian honors, in recognition of her contributions to music and humanitarian work. The award was presented during a ceremony held at the Governor’s House in Lahore.

== Albums ==
- Raaz – 1995
- Roshni – 1998
- Rung – 2002
- Rough Cut – 2007
- Aasmaan – 2009
- Wajd – 2017
- Vasl – 2022

== Awards and nominations ==
Year	Category	Notes	Result
Nigar Awards
1995	Best Playback Singer	Sargam	Won
Waheed Murad Award
1995	Best New Talent	–	Won
1995	Best Singer (Female) T.V.	–	Won
NTM Awards
1995	Best Female Singer by Viewers' Choice	Nusrat Fateh Ali Khan awarded "Best Male Singer" at same show.	Won
Pakistan Music Industry Awards
1996	Best Female Singer	–	Won
1996	Best Selling Album	"Raaz"	Won
PTV Awards
2000	Best Female Singer	–	Won
2010	–	Honoured for contributions to PTV and to Pakistani music	Honoured
Indus Music Awards
2004	Best Female Singer	–	Won
2005	Best Female Singer	–	Won
Women's Excellence Awards
2005	Excellence in Pop & Light Music	–	Won
Government of Pakistan
2006	Tamgha-e-Imtiaz (Medal of Distinction)	–	Awarded
The Musik Awards
2008	Best English Song	"Living This Lie" feat. Amir Zaki	Won
2008	Most Wanted Female	–	Won
Aag TV
2009	Artist of the Month	–	Won
Pakistan Style Awards
2010	Stylish Singer Female	–	Won
MTV Pakistan Awards
2009	Best Video	"Iss Baar Milo" (Awarded to Director, Jami)	Won
2012	Best Music Act	–	Nominated
2012	Best Song of the Year	"Dil Janiya" from Shoaib Mansoor's "Bol"	Nominated
TV ONE
2009	Best Female Singer	–	Won
Brit Asia Music Awards
2010	Best Female Act	–	Nominated
2010	Best International Act	–	Nominated
Indus Style Awards
2010	Most Innovative Singer	–	Won
2010	Most Stylish Female Pop Singer	–	Won
Lux Style Awards
2002	Best Live Act	N/A	Nominated
2012	Song of the Year	"Hona Tha Pyar" feat. Atif Aslam	Nominated
2012	Best Original Soundtrack	"Bol" Soundtrack	Nominated
2017	Best Original Soundtrack	Udaari (Hum TV)	Nominated
2018	Album of the Year	"WAJD"	Won
2022	Best Emerging Talent - Critics Choice	Raqeeb Se	Won
2022	Best TV Actress - Critics' Choice	Raqeeb Se	Won
2023	Best TV Actress - Critics' Choice	Dobara (TV Series)	Nominated
Big Apple Music Awards
2014	Best Female Singer of Pakistan	–	Won
2015	Best Female Singer of Pakistan	–	Won
2015	Most Popular Female Singer (International)	First Pakistani singer to ever be nominated in this category.	Nominated
2016	Best Female Singer of Pakistan		Won
Pakistan Media Awards
2010	Best Female Singer	–	Nominated
2014	Best Drama Original Soundtrack	"Zindagi Gulzar Hai"	Nominated
HUM Awards
2013	Best Solo Artist		Nominated
2014	Best Original Soundtrack	"Zindagi Gulzar Hai"	Won
2017	Best Original Soundtrack	Sajna ve Sajna – Udaari	Nominated
2022	Best New Sensation (Female)	Raqeeb Se	Won
International Dynamic Women's Day Award
2015	The Dynamic Award	–	Won
Daily Times Pakistan
2015	Pride of Pakistan	–	Awarded
Hum Style Awards
2018	Most Stylish Performer – Female	–	Won
IDEAS Pakistan
2018	Icon Singer of the Year	–	Won
International Shaan-e-Pakistan Music Awards (SEPMA)
2020	Best TVC	–	Won
Hello! Pakistan Annual Awards
2021	Acting Debut Award (Female)	Awarded for role as Sakina in Raqeeb Se	Won
Eastern Eye
2021	Top Global 50 Asian Celebrities	Placed number 30.	Awarded
2022	Top Global 50 Asian Celebrities	Placed number 40.	Awarded
2023	Top Global 50 Asian Celebrities	Placed number 38.	Awarded
Government College University
2022	Lifetime Achievement Award	Recognized for contributions to music and philanthropy.	Awarded
People's Choice Awards 2023
2023	Best Female Singer	For song Jani Door Gaye	Won
