= Hocane =

Hocane is a Pakistani surname.

- Mawra Hocane (born 1992), Pakistani actress
- Urwa Hocane (born 1991), Pakistani actress, model and media personality
