= Jani Door Gaye =

Qawwali performed by Nusrat Fateh Ali Khan

Song by Nusrat Fateh Ali Khan
- Language: Punjabi
- Released: 1990
- Genre: Qawwali
- Label: Oriental Star Agencies
- Composer: Nusrat Fateh Ali Khan
- Lyricist: Anwar Hussain Jogi

"Jani Door Gaye" (Punjabi: جانی دُور گئے transl. "My beloved has gone far away") is a poignant Punjabi qawwali that was originally composed and performed by Ustad Nusrat Fateh Ali Khan. The lyrics were penned by the poet Anwar Hussain Jogi. Nusrat often developed and performed his qawwalis live in spiritual gatherings or concerts for years before they were officially recorded and released. Thus, even though Nusrat had given live performances of Jani Door Gaye in the late 1980s, the first official studio recording wasn't released until 1990, when it became the title track of his album Jani Door Gaye, Volume 7. Over the years, it has inspired numerous covers, including a notable rendition by Hadiqa Kiani in 2023, which paid tribute to Nusrat’s original composition with a modern production.

== Description ==
In keeping with the Islamic Sufi tradition, Jani Door Gaye invites two complementary interpretations, one grounded in human love and the other in love for the Divine. At its most immediate level, it can be understood as an expression of human love and a heartfelt lament of a lover mourning the pain of separation from someone they deeply cherished. The beloved’s departure creates a void that the singer struggles to comprehend, producing emotional collapse, disorientation, and a pervasive sense of loss that colours their entire world. This sense of loss is conveyed right from the opening lines, “Vichar gaya mere dil da jani, Te main kakhaan waangar rul gayi” ("The beloved of my heart has departed, and like dust I'm scattered and wandering"). The imagery of being reduced to dust conveys a complete loss of stability and coherence. This fragility is intensified in the lines “Phulan naalon nazuk jindri, Meri vich kandeyan de rul gayi” ("My life more delicate than flowers, was dragged among thorns and shattered"), where a once tender existence is shown as wounded and broken. The devastation of the beloved's separation is further expressed by the lines “Gham sajna de maar mukaya, Te main athru ban ke dul gayi” ("The pain of my beloved’s absence has crushed me, so like a tear, I silently flowed away"), where grief becomes so overwhelming that the self appears to dissolve entirely. This sense of irreversible loss is reinforced through the repeated refrain “Inj vichre mur nahi aaye, mur nahi aaye, Jani door gaye” ("Those who separate like this never return, never return, my beloved has gone far away"), while sustaining a deep longing for a presence that once provided emotional grounding and meaning. Grief is further expanded through a plea directed toward friends or companions, “Mere sakhiyo, dard wandawo ni, Koi lagda chaara laawo ni, Mere maahi nu morh le aawo ni” ("O my friends, share this pain with me, find some remedy if there is one, bring my beloved back to me"). This appeal situates heartbreak within a shared human experience, where suffering is voiced collectively rather than endured alone. In this romantic interpretation, Jani Door Gaye becomes a poignant reflection on love’s vulnerability, the pain of separation, and the overwhelming desire for reunion with the one who has gone away.

On a deeper level, Jani Door Gaye resonates strongly within the Islamic Sufi tradition, where the language of romantic love serves as a metaphor for the soul’s relationship with the Divine. Here, “Jani” or “Mahiya” symbolizes the Divine Beloved, often understood as Allah (God) or a murshid (spiritual guide), while “door gaye” expresses the seeker’s perceived distance from the spiritual source. Within this framework, separation is not merely sorrowful, it may become transformative. The pain of longing purifies the heart, dissolves the ego, and intensifies ishq (divine love). What appears as despair becomes a spiritual force that draws the seeker closer to Allah. This mystical dimension shines through in lines such as: “Ik mahiya teri yaad na bhuldi, Baaki har shae jag di bhul gayi” ("O beloved, only your memory never fades, everything else in the world has been forgotten"). On the surface this is obsessive love; mystically, it evokes dhikr, the constant remembrance of Allah in which worldly attachments fall away from consciousness. The experience of separation is further deepened through imagery of burning and restlessness. In “Agg hijr di baldi seene” ("The fire of separation burns in my chest"), longing is presented as an intense, consuming force that defines the inner state. This state of unease continues in “Neend ankhan chon ud di jaave” ("Sleep keeps escaping from my eyes"), where the loss of rest suggests a condition of constant wakefulness, reflecting a heart that cannot settle in the absence of the Beloved. The emotional pressure of separation emerges more viscerally in “Hijr tere vich uthdiyan hookan” ("Cries of pain arise within me in your separation"), evoking an almost involuntary outpouring of grief, where the heart responds instinctively to distance from the Divine. Longing also takes the form of a desire for vision and presence in “Ankhan bhukhiyan daras deedar diyan” ("My eyes are starving to behold your glimpse"), where the act of seeing becomes symbolic of spiritual unveiling. Within Sufi thought, this yearning for deedar reflects the soul’s desire for direct encounter with the Divine, beyond abstraction or ritual practice. This state of deprivation expands into a broader sense of existential emptiness in “Ik yaar bajon sanu sooni lagdi khudaayi” ("Without my beloved, even the world feels empty"), where creation itself appears hollow in the absence of divine connection.

In this context, the refrain “Inj vichre mur nahi aaye, Jani door gaye” (Punjabi: اینج وچھڑے مُڑ نئیں آئے، جانی دور گئے; lit. "They parted thus, and never came back again") acquires a deeper metaphysical resonance, expressing the fear that distance from the Divine, whether through heedlessness or worldly distraction, results in a profound and disorienting loss. Yet within Sufi understanding, this suffering is not without purpose. The intensity of separation becomes a means of refinement, drawing the heart back toward the Divine. Longing evolves into a form of spiritual discipline, and absence itself begins to function as a subtle mode of presence. In this way, the qawwali suggests that even in separation, the Beloved remains the ultimate source of the seeker’s inner transformation, drawing the heart toward eventual return.
