= Haasil (Pakistani TV series) =

Pakistani television series

- Genre: Romantic drama
- Written by: Rukhsana Nigar
- Directed by: Abdullah Badini
- Starring: Ahsan Khan; Mawra Hocane; Sonya Hussain; Humayoun Ashraf
- Opening theme: Haasil by Asim Azhar
- Country of origin: Pakistan
- Original language: Urdu
- No. of episodes: 27

Production
- Production location: Karachi

Original release
- Network: Geo tv
- Release: 28 August 2016 – 5 April 2017

Haasil (Eng: Result) is a Pakistani drama television series aired during 2016-17 on Geo Entertainment. It is produced by Huzu Productions and stars Ahsan Khan, Mawra Hocane and Sonya Hussain in leads. The series revolves around two friends with contrasting personalities and family backgrounds.

== Plot ==
Haasil is the story of two friends who have contrasting personalities and family backgrounds. Hareem (Mawra Hocane) is wealthy and has religious conviction while Rimsha (Sonya Hussain) is underprivileged, orphaned, and living with her sister. Rimsha's parents had a dark past which is constantly brought up by close ones. This leads to a carefree attitude towards life and relationships. Due to her circumstances, (being abandoned and orphaned at a young age), she became a very different person compared to Hareem.

One day, Hareem and Rimsha argue and Hareem questions Rimsha's character, implying Rimsha is sleeping around with her different 'cousins'. After having a similar argument with her sister the previous night, this devastating statement hurts Rimsha, making her vow to get revenge. The two women turn into rivals. Will they mend their friendship or does Rimsha's quest to avenge this betrayal lead her on a path of ruin, for everyone involved?

== Cast ==
- Ahsan Khan as Junaid
- Mawra Hocane as Hareem
- Sonya Hussain as Rimsha
- Humayun Ashraf as Nabeel
- Humaira Ali as Junaid's mother
- Lubna Aslam as Hareem's mother
- Mizna Waqas as Momina

== Soundtrack ==
The original soundtrack of "Haasil" is composed by Qasim Azhar while the lyrics and vocals are provided by Asim Azhar.

== Production ==
In July 2016, it was reported that Hocane will star in Haasil alongside Khan and Hussain, marking her return to Pakistani television after her debut in Bollywood with the 2016 film Sanam Teri Kasam.

== See also ==
- List of programs broadcast by Geo TV
