= Tich Button =

2022 film directed by Qasim Ali Mureed

- Theatrical release poster
- Directed by: Qasim Ali Mureed
- Written by: Faiza Iftikhar
- Produced by: Salman Iqbal; Urwa Hocane
- Starring: Farhan Saeed; Iman Ali; Feroze Khan; Sonya Hussyn
- Production companies: Shooting Star Studio; Salman Iqbal Films; ARY Films; Paramount Pictures
- Release date: 25 November 2022
- Country: Pakistan
- Language: Urdu
- Budget: 12 crores
- Box office: Rs. 12.12 crore (US$430,000)

Tich Button (Urdu: ٹچ بٹن) is a 2022 Pakistani comedy drama film, directed by Qasim Ali Mureed in his feature film directorial debut and produced by Salman Iqbal and Urwa Hocane in her debut production. It stars Farhan Saeed, Iman Ali, Feroze Khan and Sonya Hussyn. The film is released on 25 November 2022.

The principal photography of the film began in February 2019. It was scheduled to be released on Eid al-Fitr 2020, but was postponed due to the COVID-19 pandemic, then later it was released on 25 November 2022.

== Plot ==
Kaka, a young man, helps Saqib when he refuses to marry his cousin Shakeela. As a result of this refusal, complications kick in and a pile of lies generate. As the story unfolds, Leena, a girl from Turkey enters this triangle and what follows is a story of mishaps and love.

== Cast ==
- Farhan Saeed as Kaka Sahab
- Iman Ali as Leena
- Feroze Khan as Saqib
- Sonya Hussyn as Shakeela
- Samiya Mumtaz as Kulsoom
- Sohail Ahmed as Choudhary Nijaz
- Humaira Ali as Parveen
- Marhoom Ahmad Bilal as Bhatti
- Marina Khan as Pammi
- Noor ul Hassan as Iqbal
- Gul-e-Rana as Saqib's mother
- Qavi Khan as Dada
- Raheela Agha as Dadi
- Ali Sikandar as Kaka's friend
- Urwa Hocane as Special appearance in item song "Pretty Face"

== Production ==
The principal photography began in February 2019. In November, the cast and crew landed in Turkey to begin filming there.

Director Qasim Ali Mureed described the film as "a vibrant, Punjab-based film".

== Soundtrack ==
The first song from the album titled "Ehsaan Hai Tumhara" by Farhan Saeed and Jonita Gandhi was released on Oct 21 2022. The second song titled "Mein Ni Boldi" by Humaira Arshad was released on Oct 23, 2022. This song was recreated by Saji Ali & Adrian David Emmanuel, with additional lyrics by Saji Ali, from Arshad's 2002 song "Mein ni Boldi, Mere Ch Mera Yaar Bolda". The third song "Pretty Face Ye Mera", featuring Farhan Saeed and Urwa Hocane, sung by Jabar Abbas and Aima Baig, with lyrics penned down by Shakeel Sohail, was released on 19 Nov, 2022.

== Critical reception ==
Mohammad Kamran Jawaid of the Dawn praised the film for its engaging storyline, visuals, and performances, particularly Farhan Saeed and Sohail Ahmed, but critiqued Iman Ali's underutilization in the film.

== Accolades ==
Year	Awards	Category	Recipient/ nominee	Result	Ref.
October 6, 2023	Lux Style Awards	Best Film (Viewers' choice)	Tich Button	Nominated	
October 6, 2023	Lux Style Awards	Best Film Actress	Marina Khan	Nominated	
October 6, 2023	Lux Style Awards	Best Film Actor	Feroze Khan	Won	
October 6, 2023	Lux Style Awards	Best Film Actor	Farhan Saeed	Nominated	
October 6, 2023	Lux Style Awards	Best Film Song	"Ehsaan Hai Tumhara"	Nominated	
