= Urwa Hocane =

Pakistani model, presenter, actress, VJ, and model (born 1991)

Urwa Hussain
- عروہ حسین
- Born: UrwaTul Wusqua Hussain; 2 July 1991 (age 35); Karachi, Sindh, Pakistan
- Occupations: Model, Actress, VJ
- Years active: 2011–present
- Spouse: Farhan Saeed (m. 2016)
- Children: 1
- Relatives: Mawra Hocane (sister); Ameer Gilani (brother-in-law)

UrwaTul Wusqua Hussain, better known by her stage name Urwa Hocane (/ˈʊərwə hoʊˈseɪn/; born 2 July 1991) is a Pakistani actress, model and media personality. She made her acting debut with Khushboo Ka Ghar as Rukhsana in 2012. Hocane is best known for portraying Meera in Udaari which earned her Hum Awards for Best On-screen Couple shared with Farhan Saeed and a nomination in the Hum Awards for Best Actress Popular. She played the role of Guddi in Momina Duraid's Mushk which earned her a Lux Style Award for Best Actress Critics nomination.

She made her film debut with Nabeel Qureshi's romantic comedy Na Maloom Afraad and later appeared in Punjab Nahi Jaungi, directed by Nadeem Baig. In 2022, she is all set to make her debut as a producer with the romantic drama Tich Button.

== Early life and career ==
Hocane was born in Karachi, but she grew up in Islamabad, where she completed her education at Bahria College, Islamabad. She is the elder sister of another television actress, Mawra Hocane. As a teenager, she performed as a theater artist before she started working as a VJ for ARY Musik. As a sign of filial devotion to her younger sibling Mawra, when Urwa started her career, she chose to use the name Hocane, and over time, it stuck.

== Career ==
Hocane made her acting debut with a leading role in the 2012 romantic drama Meri Ladli alongside Ahsan Khan and Sajal Ali. She later appeared in serials such as Kahi Un Kahi and Madiha Maliha. Her portrayal of a girl subjected to family pressures and a forced wedding in Marasim.

She made her film debut in the 2014 romantic comedy Na Maloom Afraad, opposite Fahad Mustafa, Mohsin Abbas Haider, and Javed Sheikh. The film received generally positive reviews, and she was praised for her performance. She was offered Ekta Kapoor's Bollywood film Azhar alongside Emran Hashmi, which she refused saying, she was not going to do kissing and bold scenes on screen.

In January 2019, Hocane announced her first project as a producer, a romantic film with her husband Farhan Saeed titled Tich Button. They are producing the film together. In March, Hocane posted a picture from her shooting of Tich Button at Nankana Sahib, on her Instagram account.

In June 2019, she launched her clothing line in collaboration with her sister Mawra Hocane.

In 2020, she starred in the television series Mushk opposite Imran Ashraf. In 2026, Hocane will reunite with her Marasim and Udaari co-star, Ahsan Khan, in romance-drama Aap Ki Izzat, portraying a loving and juvenile housewife.

== Personal life ==
Hocane married Farhan Saeed on 16 December 2016 at Lahore, Pakistan. On 6 October 2023, Hocane and Saeed announced their pregnancy through social media. On January 3, 2024, the couple welcomed their first child, a daughter named Jahan Aara.

== Filmography ==
=== Films ===
Key
| † | Denotes films that have not yet been released |

| Year | Film | Role | Director | Notes | Ref(s) |
|---|---|---|---|---|---|
| 2014 | Na Maloom Afraad | Naina | Nabeel Qureshi | | |
| 2017 | Punjab Nahi Jaungi | Durdana Butt | Nadeem Beyg | | |
| 2017 | Na Maloom Afraad 2 | Naina Farhan Ahmed | Nabeel Qureshi | | |
| 2017 | Rangreza | Reshmi | Amir Mohiuddin | | |
| 2022 | Tich Button | Herself | Qasim Ali Mureed | Special appearance in song "Pretty Face"; Also producer | |
| TBA | Andaaz † | Anum | Zeshan Khan | | |
| TBA | Jhol† | TBA | Shahid Shafaat | Filming | |

=== Television ===
| Year | Title | Role | Notes | Ref. |
|---|---|---|---|---|
| 2011 | Kountry Luv | | | |
| 2012 | Khushboo Ka Ghar | Rukhsana | Cameo appearance | |
| 2013 | Ideals | Wajeeha | | |
| 2013 | Yeh Shadi Nahi Ho Sakti | Alishba | | |
| 2013 | Kahi Unkahi | Anam Parvez | | |
| 2013 | Madiha Maliha | Maliha Akhtar | | |
| 2013 | Meri Ladli | Rafia Tabraiz | | |
| 2013 | Aik Pagal Si Larki | Nabeela | | |
| 2014 | Namak Paray | | | |
| 2014 | Marasim | Nayab | | |
| 2014 | Tum Meray He Rehna | Rania | | |
| 2014 | Laal Chaadar | Bareera | | |
| 2014 | Kitni Girhain Baaki Hain | Maya | Anthology series | |
| 2014 | Ghayal | Sidra | | |
| 2015 | Mere Ajnabi | Hareem | | |
| 2016 | Udaari | Ameera "Meera" Majid | | |
| 2020 | Mushk | Guddi Adam | | |
| 2021 | Neeli Zinda Hai | Neeli Pervaiz | | |
| 2021 | Parizaad | Layla Saba Agha | | |
| 2021 | Amanat | Mehar Zaraar Hussain | | |
| 2022 | Badzaat | Anabiya "Biya" Daniyal | | |
| 2022 | Meri Shehzadi | Dania Khan Shehroze | | |
| 2026 | Aap Ki Izzat | Beena Tabish | | |

=== Telefilms ===
| Year | Series | Role | Notes |
|---|---|---|---|
| 2013 | Anaya Or uski Mayen | Anaya | |
| 2017 | Pyar Ki Love Story | Saman | |

=== Special appearances ===
| Year | Series | Role | Notes |
|---|---|---|---|
| 2015 | Tonite with HSY | Herself with Farhan Saeed | Hum Sitaray Season 2 Episode 5 |

== Awards and nominations ==
| Year | Award | Category | Work | Result | Ref. |
|---|---|---|---|---|---|
| 2014 | 2nd Hum Awards | Best Soap Actress | Aik Pagal Si Larki | Nominated | |
| 2015 | 14th Lux Style Awards | Best Actress - Film | Na Maloom Afraad | Nominated | |
| 2017 | 5th Hum Awards | Best Actress - Jury | Udaari | Nominated | |
| 2017 | 5th Hum Awards | Best Actress - Popular | Udaari | Nominated | |
| 2017 | 5th Hum Awards | Best On-screen Couple - Jury (with Farhan Saeed) | Udaari | Won | |
| 2017 | 5th Hum Awards | Best On-screen Couple - Popular (with Farhan Saeed) | Udaari | Nominated | |
| 2017 | International Pakistan Prestige Awards | Best On-screen Couple (with Farhan Saeed) | Udaari | Won | |
| 2018 | 17th Lux Style Awards | Best Supporting Actress - Film | Punjab Nahi Jaungi | Won | |
| 2021 | 20th Lux Style Awards | Best Television Actress (Critics' Choice) | Mushk | Nominated | |
