= Haliç Congress Center =

- Haliç Kongre Merkezi

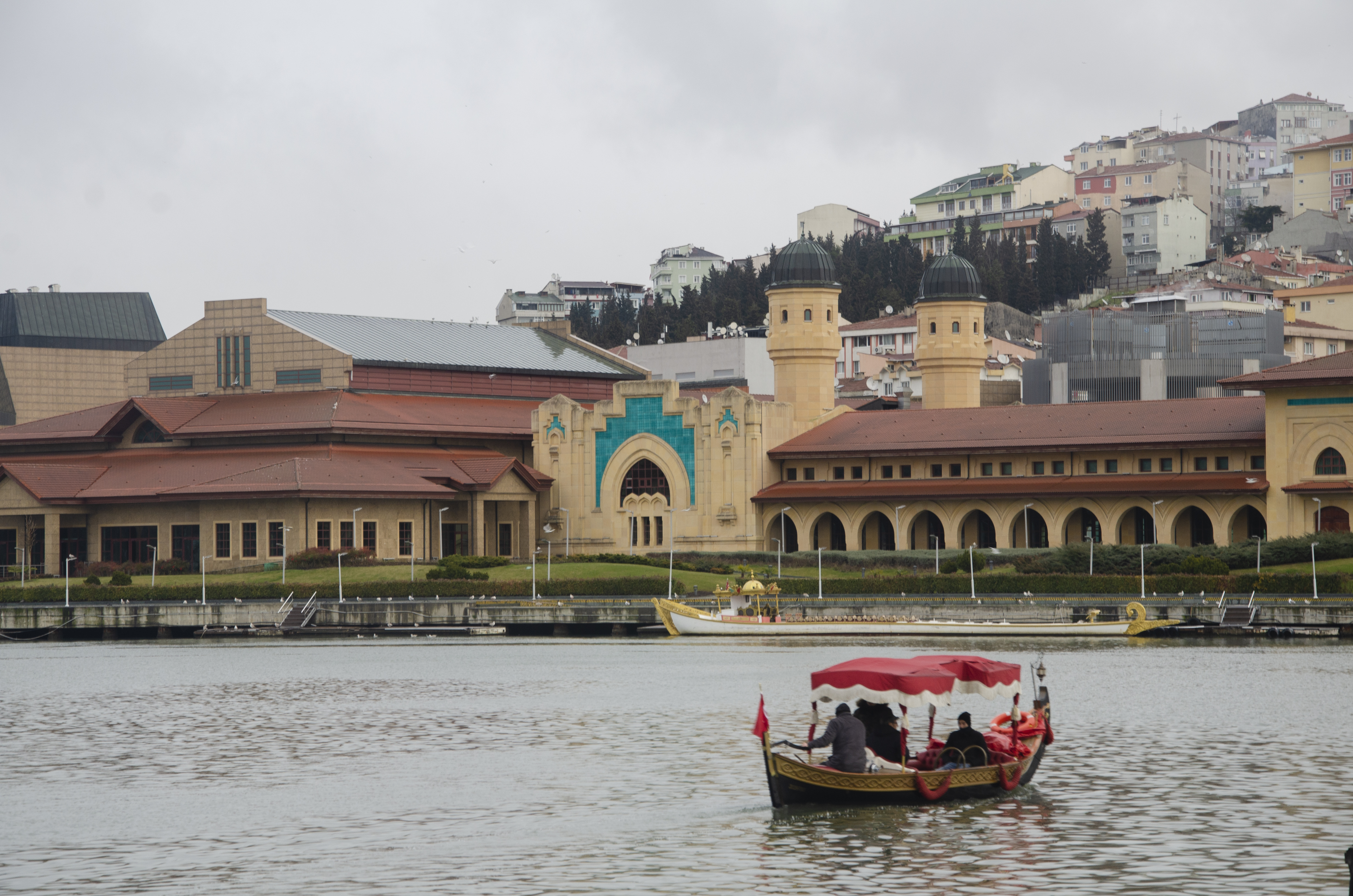
- Former names: Karağaç Slaughterhouse; Sütlüce Slaughterhouse
- Etymology: Golden Horn (Turkish: Haliç)

General information
- Status: Completed
- Type: Cultural center
- Architectural style: First national architectural movement
- Location: Beyoğlu
- Town or city: Istanbul
- Country: Turkey
- Coordinates: 41.0503°N 28.9400°E
- Groundbreaking: 29 November 1919
- Opened: 1923 (as slaughterhouse)
- Renovated: 2009 (as congress center)
- Grounds: 102,000 m2

Design and construction
- Architect(s): Vedat Tek

Website
- halic.com/tr/

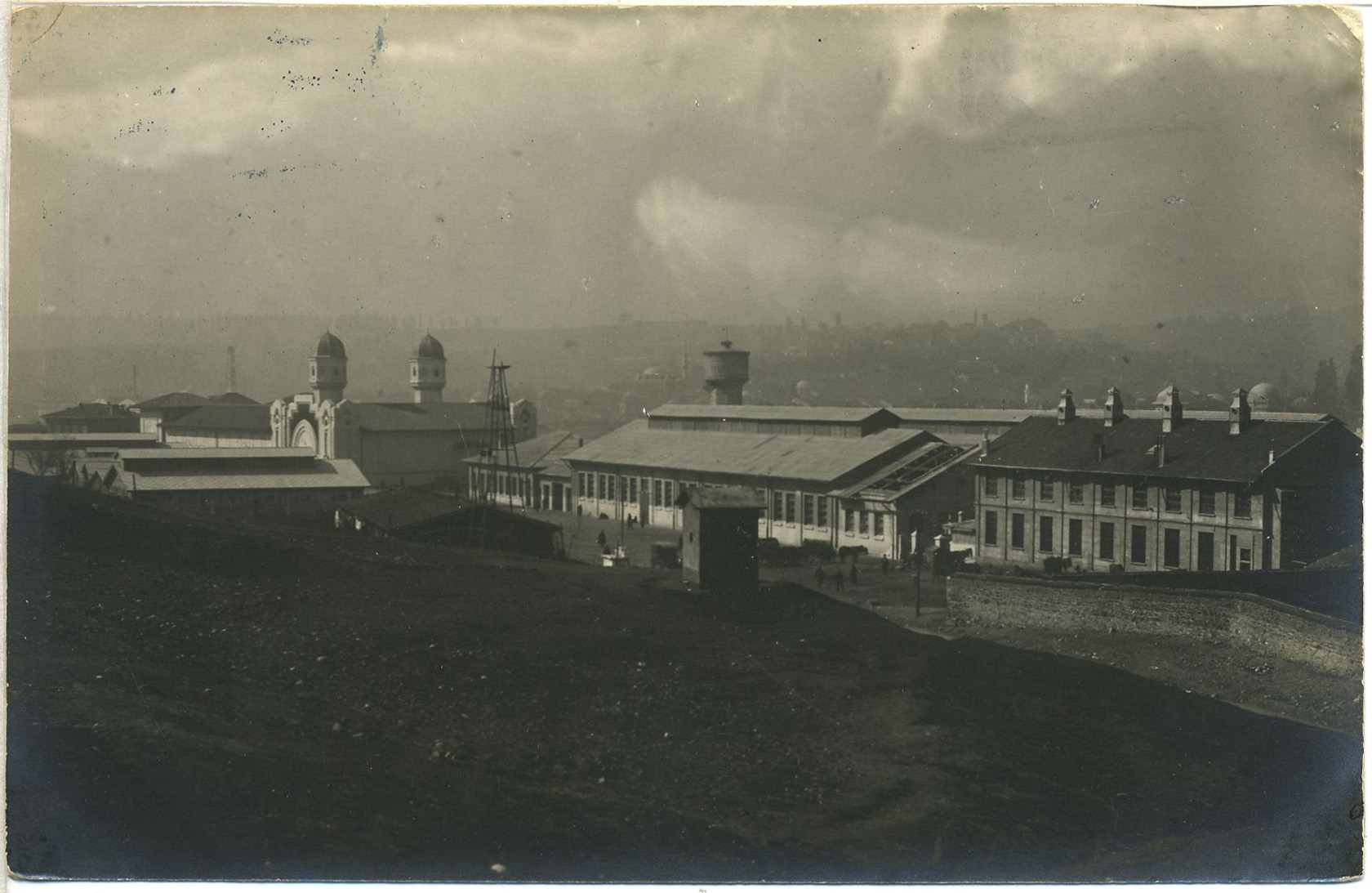
A photograph of the Sütlüce Slaughterhouse between 1926 and 1929

Haliç Congress Center (Turkish: Haliç Kongre Merkezi), formerly Karağaç Slaughterhouse (Karağaç Mezbahası) or Sütlüce Slaughterhouse (Sütlüce Mezbahası), is a building initially opened in 1923 in order to ensure hygienic slaughtering and supervision in Istanbul. Its architect is Vedat Tek.

Since 2009, it has been used as a congress and cultural center, under the name of Haliç Congress Center.

== History ==
Private slaughterhouses in various districts of Istanbul were in bad shape, even though they were inspected by the Ministry of Agriculture. The number of slaughterhouses, which was reduced to 147 during the war, decreased to 22 after the war. The responsibility for the inspections was taken from the Ministry of Agriculture and given to the Şehremaneti (city government).

Cemil Bey, who went to Geneva after the war, was appointed head of the Şehremaneti on 3 May 1919, after returning to Istanbul. Cemil Bey, who worked on the issue of slaughterhouses after he took office, was put under pressure by the Istanbul Occupation Forces Command due to the condition of the slaughterhouses. On 17 July 1919, the Extraordinary Superintendent of France sent a letter of protest to the Ministry of Foreign Affairs regarding the issue.

After various complaints, the foundations of the Sütlüce Slaughterhouse were laid on 29 November 1919. The cost of the construction was 396,000 liras. On 12 July 1923, the slaughterhouse started to serve after an opening ceremony. The slaughterhouse, which was made independent in 1928 under the name of Karaağaç Institutions Assembly Administration, became a part of the Istanbul Municipality in 1932 under the name of Karaağaç Institutions Directorate. The slaughterhouse, which was the largest slaughtering facility in Istanbul, began to operate only as a meat distribution center after 1985 due to concerns that it polluted the Golden Horn.

Bedrettin Dalan, the mayor of Istanbul Metropolitan Municipality at the time, decided to turn the idle slaughterhouse into a cultural center within the scope of the Golden Horn project. 3 different plans prepared within the scope of the project were set forward, but none of them were realized. No progress was made during the term of Nurettin Sözen, who became the mayor of Istanbul Metropolitan Municipality after Bedrettin Dalan. The construction tender, which was the first concrete step to transform the idle slaughterhouse into a cultural center, was made in 1997 by Recep Tayyip Erdoğan, the then Istanbul Metropolitan Mayor. In 1998, the idle slaughterhouse buildings were demolished and the construction of the cultural center began. The project, designed by Prof Dr Cengiz Eruzun, was planned to be completed by 1999, but was finished in March 2009 and the building was opened with the 5th World Water Council meeting.
