= Meri Ladli =

Pakistani drama series

- Genre: Drama; Romance
- Written by: Maha Malik
- Directed by: Nadeem Siddique
- Starring: Sajal Aly; Urwa Hocane; Sami Khan; Ahsan Khan; Adil Murad; Faizan Khawaja
- Country of origin: Pakistan
- Original language: Urdu
- No. of episodes: 24

Production
- Producer: A & B Entertainment
- Running time: 40-45 Minutes

Original release
- Network: ARY Digital; ARY Zindagi
- Release: 5 May – 18 August 2012

Meri Ladli (Urdu: میری لاڈلی, lit. 'My Dear') is a 2012 Pakistani romantic drama television series directed by Nadeem Siddique, written by Maha Malik and produced by A & B Entertainment. It aired on ARY Digital in 2012. Meri Ladli became among the highest-rated television serials of the year.

== Plot ==
As a young woman, Aarfah ran away from home to marry Sajid. But her new life is filled with hardships; her mother-in-law dislikes her. Influenced by his mother, Sajid starts to hate her as well. When Aarfah gives birth to a girl, Eesha, she is divorced and thrown out of the house. In severe financial crisis and desperation, she returns to her parents' home, and after some resistance, she is allowed back. But her life resembles the same fate as that of a house help. Her brother's wife, Fakhira, hates her and does everything she can to make Aarfah feel unwelcome. Fakhira's daughter Rafia and Eesha grow older together and become friends, much to the disapproval of Fakhira. Some years later, Tabraiz arrives from England, and both girls develop feelings towards him. Both mothers want their daughters to marry Tabraiz, who only has feelings for Eesha. As the story unfolds, the viewers witness the never-ending harshness of Fakhira, the sacrifices made by Aarfah and her death – and the emotional turmoil that both Eesha and Rafia go through during their lives.

Fakhira gets Eesha married against her will in a middle-class family with Abdul Hadi, who is already married to another woman and lives in another city. His only reason for marrying Eesha is to have someone to care for his ageing parents while he is away. Eesha soon wins her in-laws' hearts with her serenity and good nature, and she pursues her education in medicine. When Abdul Hadi wants to start a family, he wishes to return to his parents, which his wife does not approve of.

Meanwhile, a heartbroken Tabraiz leaves for England, and Fakhira gets Rafia married into an elite class rich family. Little do they know that karma will hit her as Rafia's husband, Arbaaz, is an alcoholic and a divorcé. He starts abusing Rafia and stealing her things for his craving for alcohol and girlfriend Sweety. Things get worse, and Rafia leaves Arbaaz. It serves as a wake-up call to Fakhira, and she apologizes for all her wrongdoings to Eesha. She offers Eesha to obtain a divorce and remarry Tabraiz. Tabraiz also returns for Eesha, knowing her story. However, Eesha is on better terms with her husband, who is secretly in love with Eesha now and asks Tabraiz to marry Rafia. In the end, we see Rafia living happily ever after with Tabraiz and Eesha with Abdul Hadi.

== Cast ==
- Sajal Aly as Eesha
- Urwa Hocane as Rafia
- Sami Khan as Abdul Hadi
- Ahsan Khan as Tabraiz
- Adil Murad as Sajid
- Faizan Khawaja as Arbaaz
- Maria Wasti as Arfa (Eesha's mother)
- Faraz Farooqui as Gulsher
- Akhtar Hasnain as Rafia's father
- Tehreem Zuberi as Rafia's mother
- Qaiser Naqvi as Ahsan's mother
- Abdullah Akram

== Soundtrack ==
Meri Ladli's title song was sung by Wardah Lodhi, composed by Waqar Ali, lyrics by S.K Khalish and written by Maha Malik.

== Reception ==
Meri Ladli was ranked in the three highly watched serials of the year after Hum TV's Humsafar and Urdu 1's Ishq-e-Memnu (Turkish serial dubbed in Urdu).

== See also ==
- List of Pakistani television serials
