= Udaari =

Pakistani television series

- Genre: Drama; Romance; Crime
- Created by: Momina Duraid Productions
- Developed by: Sultana Siddiqui
- Written by: Farhat Ishtiaq
- Screenplay by: Farhat Ishtiaq
- Directed by: Mohammed Ehteshamuddin
- Starring: Samiya Mumtaz; Bushra Ansari; Ahsan Khan; Urwa Hocane; Farhan Saeed; Hina Altaf Khan
- Theme music composer: Sahir Ali Bagga; Sohail Haider
- Opening theme: Sajna Ve Sajna by Hadiqa Kiani and Farhan Saeed
- Ending theme: Bol Ke Lab Azaad; Hadiqa Kiani and Farhan Saeed
- Country of origin: Pakistan
- Original languages: Urdu; Punjabi
- No. of seasons: 1
- No. of episodes: 25

Production
- Producer: Momina Duraid
- Production locations: Lahore, Punjab; Multan, Punjab
- Cinematography: Azhar Ali
- Editors: Mehmood Ali; Shehraz Fiyaz; Muhammad Ali Sooni; Ali Raza Ansari
- Camera setup: Multi camera
- Running time: 35-42 minutes
- Production companies: Momal Productions; Kashf Foundation

Original release
- Network: Hum TV
- Release: 10 April – 25 September 2016

Udaari (title from Punjabi: اُڈاری; lit: Flight) is an Urdu and Punjabi language social Pakistani television series that was created and co-produced by Kashf Foundation and Momina Duraid for Hum TV. It originally aired from 10 April 2016 to 4 September 2016. The show is written by Farhat Ishtiaq and directed by Mohammed Ehteshamuddin. Udaari follows the interconnected lives of two neighbouring families, a local shopkeeper, and a university music band in the village of Mirpur and urban areas of Punjab. As their stories cross paths, the series focuses on exploring class discrimination, stigmas, women empowerment, child sexual abuse and the power and stigmatisation of music in Pakistani culture. It had an ensemble cast with Bushra Ansari, Samiya Mumtaz, Urwa Hocane, Farhan Saeed, Ahsan Khan, and Hina Altaf.

Udaari was met with critical acclaim, with praise being directed towards the performances, the care with which sensitive issues were handled, and the story arc. It was also a ratings success and was ranked among the highest rated TV series of the 2016 Pakistani televeision season. At the 16th Lux Style Awards, the series won the most for the ceremony including, Best TV Actor for Khan, Best TV Director and Best TV Play for Duraid.

== Plot ==
Udaari follows the interconnected lives of two neighbouring families, a local shopkeeper, and a university music band. Set in the village Mirpur Khas, Rashida and Sajida are close neighbours and friends. Rashida lives with her husband Majid, their children, Meera and Ejaz, and her brother Iqbal and belongs to the hereditary musician community, whose members face social discrimination because of their profession. Sajida, a widow, struggles to raise her young daughter, Zebo, while working as a domestic servant. Meanwhile, Imtiaz returns to the village after working in Dubai and opens a mobile phone shop. In Lahore, university students Arsh, Maleeha, Haris and Farwa form a music band and participate in a televised music competition.

Meera falls in love with Sajida's nephew, Ilyas, but their relationship is strained by his family's prejudice against her background as a musician. After rescuing Sajida from local thugs, Imtiaz, being a cousin of her late husband, proposes marriage to her. Believing him to be trustworthy and seeking a stable future for her daughter, Sajida accepts, and the couple initially lead a happy married life. Following Majid's death in an accident, however, Imtiaz attempts to sexually assault Meera, who manages to escape. Sajida refuses to believe Meera's accusation and instead supports her husband, creating a rift between the two families. Influenced by his family's views, Ilyas also ends his relationship with Meera, while the villagers ostracise Rashida's family, forcing them to consider leaving the village. when Farwa leaves the band under family pressure, Maleeha and her mother, Muneera, discover Meera's singing talent at a village wedding and invite her to join the group. Meera and her family relocate to Lahore, where she joins the band, develops a relationship with Arsh, and rises to national fame after the group wins the televised competition. Back in the village, Imtiaz begins sexually abusing Zebo and threatens to kill her and Sajida if she reveals the abuse. After discovering the truth, Sajida confronts him, but Imtiaz rapes Zebo in her presence after locking Sajida in a room. Sajida escapes, stabs Imtiaz, believing she has killed him, and flees with Zebo to Lahore, where Meera and Rashida shelter them to their home, and help them begin a new life under new identities.

Six years later, Meera has become an established singer, while Sajida has built a successful business. Having survived the attack, Imtiaz tracks them down and uses his political influence to file false criminal charges against Sajida while continuing to threaten Zebo. Arsh, now a lawyer, investigates the case with Muneera's assistance and uncovers evidence exposing Imtiaz's crimes. Encouraged by Arsh and Muneera, Zebo publicly testifies against Imtiaz. Meera also recounts his earlier attempt to assault her, strengthening the prosecution's case. Ilyas later apologises and asks Meera to resume their engagement, but she refuses. Following a public campaign and protest led by Muneera, Imtiaz's political influence turns against him and he is convicted and sentenced to life imprisonment, while Sajida is acquitted of all charges. The series concludes with the reconciliation of the two families, Meera accepting Arsh's marriage proposal and the family dedicating a song to Zebo and other survivors of abuse.

== Cast ==
Main cast of Udaari featuring (from left) Ahsan Khan as Imtiaz, Hina Altaf as Zebo, Urwa Hocane as Meera, Bushra Ansari as Sheedan, Samiya Mumtaz as Sajida, Farhan Saeed as Arsh and Areesha Ahsan as young Zebo

- Samiya Mumtaz as Sajida Bibi; nicknamed as Sajo
- Bushra Ansari as Rasheeda Bibi: nicknamed as Sheedaan
- Ahsan Khan as Imtiaz Ali Sheikh
- Urwa Hocane as Ameera Majid; nicknamed as Meera
- Farhan Saeed as Taimoor Arshad nicknamed as Arsh
- Hina Altaf as Zeb-un-Nisa Pervaiz; nicknamed Zebo
- Laila Zuberi as Muneera Khalid
- Malika Zafar as Maleeha Khalid
- Maryam Fatima as Farwa Murad
- Ins-e-Yazdan as Ejaz Majid
- Adnan Saeed as Haris Khalid
- Aqeel Abbas as Iqbal
- Haris Waheed as Ilyas
- Rehan Sheikh as Majid
- Behroze Sabzwari as Khalid
- Ambar Wajid as Afrooz
- Aliya Jamshed as Razia
- Arjumand Hussain as Ahmad
- Rashida Tabassum as Durdana
- Saife Hassan as Malik Iftikhar Hussain
- Akbar Islam as Imtiaz's Lawyer

=== Child stars ===
- Areesha Ahsan as Zebo
- Saad as Ejaz

=== Special appearances ===
- Hassan Sheheryar Yasin as himself
- Hadiqa Kiani as herself
- Emo as himself
- Babar Zaheer as himself

== Episodes ==
| No. | Title | Directed by | Written by | Run Time | Original release date | Overnight Ratings (thousands) | 7 day Viewing Data (thousands) |
|---|---|---|---|---|---|---|---|
| 1 | "Episode 1" | Mohammed Ehteshamuddin | Farhat Ishtiaq | 39:50 | 10 April 2016 | 87.1 | - |
Sheedan and her family are local musics entertainers. Sajida's s boss suggests her to think over second marriage where as Meera secretly meets Illyas (Sajida's Nephew), the two promise to get married one day. Meera and her family are set to sing in a wedding nearby where a strange man teases Meera.
| 2 | "Episode 2" | Muhammad Ehtishamudin | Farhat Ishtiaq | 42:48 | 17 April 2016 | 51.4 | 63 |
Sajida faces street goons teasing her and is saved by Imtiaz who later proposes to her; she refuses. Meera is about get molested but is saved by her family; all of them receive disrespect by the entire village as they are local musicians. Illyas has a rude attitude towards Meera as he wants her to stop singing. Illyas's mother hates Meera and shows disrespect for her family; she also abuses Sajida for thinking of re-marriage.
| 3 | "Episode 3" | Muhammad Ehtishamudin | Farhat Ishtiaq | 41:00 | 24 April 2016 | 60.3 | 72 |
Sheedan and Zebo convince Sajida to marry Imtiaz. Their marriage takes place. Illyas scolds Meera for dancing and tells her that if she continues to do so, he will not marry her. Majid dies in a car accident. Farwa receives resentment from her mother for music.
| 4 | "Episode 4" | Muhammad Ehtishamudin | Farhat Ishtiaq | 39:14 | 1 May 2016 | 42.4 | 72 |
Farwa's mother finds out the truth and makes her abandon her pursuit for music. Illyas badmouths Meera and her family and asks her to stay away from them and stop singing. Arsh, Maleeha, Haris and Farwa get selected for their band. Farwa tearfully bids farewell to her music career and leaves her song Saajna Ve Saajna with her band; she asks the members to start searching for a new female vocalists. Imtiaz develops false feelings for Meera.
| 5 | "Episode 5" | Muhammad Ehtishamudin | Farhat Ishtiaq | 37:44 | 8 May 2016 | 83.0 | 100 |
Sheedan finds out about Meera and Illyas's love affair. Sajida's sister scolds her for Meera and Illyas's relation and warns her to keep them away from her family. She then reaches Sheedan's house and insults them. The next morning, Imtiaz tries to rape Meera in his house but she escapes; Imtiaz denies when Meera and Sheedan accuse him. Sajida supports her husband over Sheedan and breaks all ties with them.
| 6 | "Episode 6" | Muhammad Ehtishamudin | Farhat Ishtiaq | 38:02 | 15 May 2016 | 70.5 | 110 |
Meera meets Illyas who breaks their relationship; he tells her that he has agreed to marry Jamila as he considers her as a woman with good character and rejects Meera calling her a Marasi. Muneera is invited to Shehnaz's (her former client's) daughter; she asks Milli to accompany her. At that marriage, Meera sings a song which describes her sorrow for Illyas; with this song, she wants to forget every moment with Illyas. Her song attracts Milli who records it. Sajida brightens herself and wears colorful dress for Imtiaz; he makes fun of her instead and calls her old; Sajida is left heartbroken.
| 7 | "Episode 7" | Muhammad Ehtishamudin | Farhat Ishtiaq | 37:27 | 22 May 2016 | 89.5 | - |
Imtiaz asks Zebo to give him foot Massage; he plans to molest her but Sajida comes and asks him to get himself ready for Illyas's engagement. Imtiaz's plan foils. Sheedan meets Zebo in the street as Sajida has forbidden her to meet Sheedan and Meera. Milli finally convinces Arsh and Haris to meet Meera. Imtiaz's lust increases for Zebo. The musicians meet Meera and decide not to cast her but the family is still invited by Milli to their house in Lahore.
| 8 | "Episode 8" | Muhammad Ehtishamudin | Farhat Ishtiaq | 38:30 | 29 May 2016 | 68.3 | 87 |
Sheedan and Meera leaves for Lahore. Imtiaz tries to falsely touch Zebo but gets interrupted by Sajida. Zebo tells Illyas and Imtiaz about Meera planning to sing on television. Illyas gets jealous of them and is manipulated by Imtiaz. Urban living is different for Sheedan and Meera who find music appliances hard to understand; this makes Arsh furious. Sajida finds out about Sheedan moving to Lahore; Imtiaz badmouths them which makes her uncomfortable.
| 9 | "Episode 9" | Muhammad Ehtishamudin | Farhat Ishtiaq | 37:33 | 5 June 2016 | 72.8 | 116 |
Arsh and Haris try teaching Meera how to sing but continue their rude attitude; Milli supports her. Sheedan tries to correct daily chores applying her traditional habits. Zebo is playing in the rain; Imtiaz's rapes her and threatens her to keep her mouth shut or he will kill her mother who was not home. Sajida reaches home and finds Zebo sick. Arsh yells at Meera for singing wrong and discourages her, but later apologizes to her when he finds her crying.
| 10 | "Episode 10" | Muhammad Ehtishamudin | Farhat Ishtiaq | 37:27 | 12 June 2016 | 35.9 | 74 |
Muneera is invited to a social conference event where she conducts her speech against child sexual abuse and Pedaphiles. Zebo gets panic attacks facing Imtiaz and is again threatened by him that he will kill her mother if she tells her. One morning, Arsh finds Meera practising for their music and gets impressed by her voice. Imtiaz begins to physically torture Zebo.
| 11 | "Episode 11" | Muhammad Ehtishamudin | Farhat Ishtiaq | 37:29 | 19 June 2016 | 115.6 | 130 |
The music band reaches the Audition venue where Haris finds out that only fifty bands will be selected. Sajida scolds Zebo for disputing Imtiaz. The band finally performs their song Sajna ve Sajna. The next day, the band is interviewed and Meera accidentally reveals that she is not Farwa.
| 12 | "Episode 12" | Muhammad Ehtishamudin | Farhat Ishtiaq | 38:48 | 26 June 2016 | 119.6 | 143 |
The band is given forty seconds to prove themselves and all judges gave them the title of top one band. The next day, their song is broadcast on TV and the entire village sees Meera on TV, making Illyas regretful. Imtiaz's plan of raping Zebo again foils. Sajida gets suspicious of Imtiaz's harsh attitude for Zebo and recalls Meera's incident with Imtiaz. At night, when Imtiaz goes out, Zebo's panic attack reveals to Sajida that Imtiaz had raped her, leaving her shocked.
| 13 | "Episode 13" | Muhammad Ehtishamudin | Farhat Ishtiaq | 37:14 | 3 July 2016 | 59.6 | 91 |
Sajida's anger increases for Imtiaz; she tells Zebo to never discuss her incident with anyone. Meera gets an offer for the OST of a TV series. Sheedan reaches her village to take all her belongings and asks Ejaz to return the money back to Sajida which she once borrowed as a loan. Along with the money, Ejaz hands over Meera's letter where she has mentioned her house address.
| 14 | "Episode 14" | Muhammad Ehtishamudin | Farhat Ishtiaq | 37:03 | 10 July 2016 | 101.1 | 128 |
Sajida reveals to Imtiaz that she knows everything he did and warns him to stay away from Zebo. He gets angry and gives her an open challenge that he will rape Zebo in front of her and forcefully locks her into a room. The entire incident is being watched by Imtiaz's colleague. Sajida loses control over her anger when he rapes her daughter and attacks him and leaves him for dead. The mother and daughter escape for Sheedan's house.
| 15 | "Episode 15" | Muhammad Ehtishamudin | Farhat Ishtiaq | 38:34 | 17 July 2016 | 79.2 | 106 |
Milli and Haris are going to England for completing a music course. Meera asks Sajida and Zebo to change their identity and name themselves as Tahira and Komal. The next day, Illyas sees Meera with Arsh. After meeting her, he tells her that he does not want to marry Jamila anymore and once again proposes to Meera. She rejects his proposal and tells him that she is a Marasi. Milli and Haris leave for England.
| 16 | "Episode 16" | Muhammad Ehtishamudin | Farhat Ishtiaq | 38:29 | 24 July 2016 | 57.7 | 84 |
Arsh tells his mother that he is in love with Meera; she compares their background and also terms Meera as a Marasi. The entire conversation is overheard by Meera who gets hurt and feels the same way as she felt earlier by Illyas's mother. She tells Arsh that she doesn't want any relationship. Tahira starts a business. After six years, Tahira is a successful businesswoman. Milli gets married and Arsh is a lawyer and Meera is now a successful singer. Tahira goes to a bakery shop where Imtiaz sees her as a changed Urban woman.
| 17 | "Episode 17" | Muhammad Ehtishamudin | Farhat Ishtiaq | 38:08 | 31 July 2016 | 85.8 | 101 |
Meera goes to America for her concert. Imtiaz returns and reveals how he was saved; he shocks Sajida and Zebo and gives them an open threat that he will attack Zebo once again. The next day, Sajida leaves Zebo in care of Sheedan and Ejaz. Imtiaz decides to kidnap Zebo who is currently residing at Sheedan's house.
| 18 | "Episode 18" | Muhammad Ehtishamudin | Farhat Ishtiaq | 37:00 | 7 August 2016 | 165.0 | 164 |
The Police SHO falsely helps Imtiaz with his FIR and arrests Sajida on charges of attempted murder. Sheedan and Ejaz seek Muneera for help who has gone to Bangladesh for social work. Along with attempted murder, the police make a false charge of a robbery on Sajida and illegally attempt a third degree force on Sajida.
| 19 | "Episode 19" | Muhammad Ehtishamudin | Farhat Ishtiaq | 35:57 | 14 August 2016 | 71.5 | 84 |
Sajida forbids Sheedan from disclosing Zebo's case. Arsh finds out about Sajida's attempted murder charge. Meera returns to Pakistan.
| 20 | "Episode 20" | Muhammad Ehtishamudin | Farhat Ishtiaq | 37:58 | 21 August 2016 | 64.2 | 77 |
Arsh is suspicious about Imtiaz's attitude with Zebo and tries to find out what happened on 21 April 2010. Sajida gets arrested over the allegation of attempting to murder Imtiaz. Afrooz (Arsh's mother) finds out about Arsh's involvement in Sajida's case and apologises to him, revealing that she has turned positive for Meera and asks him to take her to Meera's house for marriage proposal. However Meera again rejects Arsh, claiming that she will never marry anyone in her life.
| 21 | "Episode 21" | Muhammad Ehtishamudin | Farhat Ishtiaq | 38:49 | 28 August 2016 | 123.4 | 130 |
Arsh forcefully asks Meera to reveal him about Imtiaz; she first reveals to him about the incident of him trying to molest her, then she reveals him of the rape incident of Zebo. Arsh tells Zebo to stand for her rights. In the court hearing, Imtiaz blames Sajida and says that she wanted to pursue prostitution along with Zebo.
| 22 | "Episode 22" | Muhammad Ehtishamudin | Farhat Ishtiaq | 39:17 | 4 September 2016 | 141.0 | 114 |
In the court session, a police officer bribed by Imtiaz, lies showing false proofs against Sajida. Muneera, Arsh and Zebo finally get Zebo's medical report from hospital records, Zebo shows up in the next court proceeding and shocks Imtiaz. An anti-child abuse campaign is formed by the Kashf Foundation for Zebo's justice.
| 23 | "Episode 23" | Muhammad Ehtishamudin | Farhat Ishtiaq | 37:56 | 11 September 2016 | 68.2 | TBD |
On his interview, Malik Iftikhar states that he will never support Imtiaz in any of his crimes. Sajida is angry with Zebo and asks her to leave, Zebo tells her that she does not want to be labelled as a victim but wants to be known as a survivor.
| 24 | "Episode 24" | Muhammad Ehtishamudin | Farhat Ishtiaq | 38:11 | 18 September 2016 | 19.5 | TBD |
Muneera gathers public attention for Zebo and starts campaigning for her case, Meera reveals Imtiaz's rape attempt on her in the court, back in the village, it is shown that Imtiaz's gambling partner, Jamshed (eye witness of Zebo's rape incident) grieves his pain in front of his wife and daughters grave.
| 25 | "Last Episode" | Muhammad Ehtishamudin | Farhat Ishtiaq | 66:40 | 25 September 2016 | 60.1 | TBD |
Zebo gets justice when Jamshed confesses that he saw Imtiaz raping her. Imtiaz is then sentenced life imprisonment while Sajida is declared innocent. Meera gets engaged to Arsh, they both tribute a song for Zebo and all women of their country and the entire family gets united after Sajida's release.

== Production ==
=== Development ===
Udaari was developed by Hum TV's senior producer Momina Duraid of MD Productions, the channel hired the award-winning director Mohammed Ehteshamuddin to direct the series. Story of serial is written by award-winning writer Farhat Ishtiaq. It was Ishtiaq's first screenplay without a novel release, she has previously worked thrice with Momina, when she wrote mega-hit drama serials in Pakistan television history Humsafar, Mata-e-Jaan Hai Tu, and Diyar-e-Dil.

Song composition is done by Sahir Ali Bagga and Sohail Haider while background music is given by Mohsin AllahDitta who chose singers like Bushra Ansari, Hadiqa Kiani and Farhan Saeed for singing. It was Insari and Kiani's second collaboration after Pakistan Idol. Kiani and Saeed collaborated on the title song and also provided the vocals for the characters of Meeran and Arsh (portrayed by Saeed). There were discussions laid on its time slot, previously it was announced that the show will air on Saturdays replacing Durad's Gul-e-Rana. However, due to promotional reasons and Slot importance the show was given time slot of Sundays, 8:00 pm, whereas the long running series, Abroo was given a time slot of Saturdays. Udaari was initially planned to be released in 2017 after completion of filming but Duraid decided to release it in 2016 to For higher ratings to her channel. It was released in April and was planned to end along with Hum TV's Mann Mayal thereby both the shows were slotted to maintain Sunday and Monday slots to bring higher Television Rating Points (TRP) to them for the future.

=== Casting ===
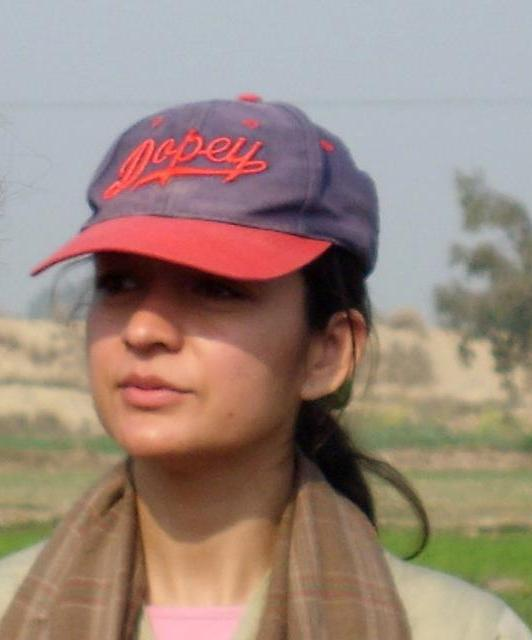
Samiya Mumtaz portrays Saajida's

Producer, writer and Director mutually chose the cast which includes Bushra Ansari, Samiya Mumtaz, Ahsan Khan, Urwa Hocane, Farhan Saeed and Hina Altaf Khan and Areesha Ahsan to play the leading roles of Sheedhan, Sajida, Imtiaz, Meera, Arsh and Zebo.

Veteran Actress Bushra Ansari was cast to portray the role of Rashida Bibi after her appraisal for her role in Kis Ki Ayeegi Baraat series, and Bilqees Kaur. The actress received critical acclaim within the pilot episode, according to her, this role was a challenge.

Urwa Hocane and Farhan Saeed marked their second appearance together as a couple being previously acted in Ary Digital's Mere Ajnaabi.

Udaari was Samiya Mumtaz's second collaboration with Momina Duraid and Mohammed Ehteshamuddin, she previously acted in drama-serial Sadqay Tumhare after which she was finalised to portray the role of Sajida. Alongside Mumtaz, actress Hina Altaf Khan was cast to portray series's the pivotal character of Zebo. Zebo's role was initially portrayed by Areesha Ahsan as child artist.

Udaari was Ahsan Khan's first portrayal of a negative role. Khan was cast to portray the role of 'Imtiaz a pedophile, this role was initially offered to actor Mikaal Zulfiqar who rejected it due to its grey personality. Speaking about difficulty in portraying this role, Khan states that Even while reading the script, I could not digest these scenes. It is definitely the most difficult character to portray on-screen, further sommecfting on his role Khan states Such abuse leaves the child traumatised forever. My maid's child was suffering from it and that's what made me realise that I need to spread awareness.

Production also chose Behroze Sabzwari, Laila Zuberi, Maryam Fatima, Rehan Sheikh, Haris Waheed and Aqeel Abbas for the supporting roles of Khalid, Muneera, Farwa, Majid, Illyas and Balay respectively. Sabzwari received critical acclaim for his role of Tajamul in Duraid's Diyar-e-Dil, he was selected to portray Khalid alongside Zuberi who joined the series after her previous project Mann Mayal with Duraid.

=== Music and sound ===
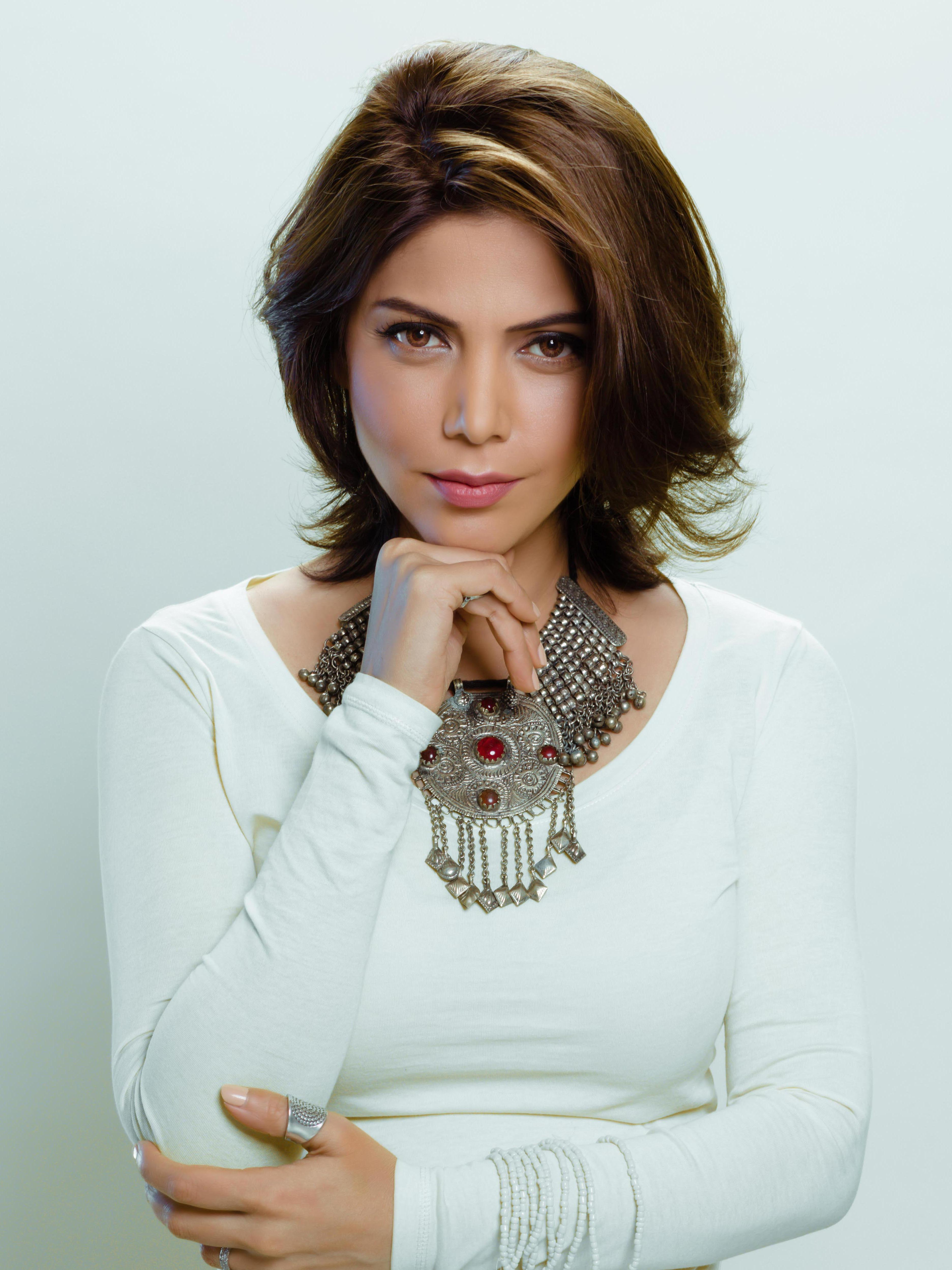
OST Vocalists Hadiqa Kiani and Farhan Saeed

All the music and songs of Udaari were composed by musician Sahir Ali Bagga and Sohail Haider with Mubarak and Zahid being the sound engineer. The background score is given by Bilal Allahdittah, the lyrics for the OST were penned down by Imran Raza. The OST Sajna Ve Sajna was sung by Farhan Saeed and Hadiqa Kiani. It marks the return of Hadiqa Kiani to Hum TV, since she performed for the channel's hit drama series Zindagi Gulzar Hai's title song. Veteran actress and vocalist Bushra Ansari performed only Punjabi music for various episodes. Rahat Fateh Ali Khan's Samjhawanki was taken and performed by Hadiqa Kiani for the series.

Udaari's full OST was released in May 2016. Saajna Ve Saajna received critical acclaim for Sahir Ali Bagga and Sohail Haider for comping and Hadiqa Kiani and Farhan Saeed for vocals. The Series dominated the Top No.1 rank according to Pakistan's Official Music App Taazi. "Mein Tenu Samjhawanki" received critical acclaim and success.

=== Filming and locations ===
Principal photography and filming began in February 2016 and finishes in June 2016, with approximately 25 episodes. Shooting was extensively done in Multan's village Mirpur Khas and in Karachi. Udaari's first promo was released in March 2016. Chief editing and cinematography was done by Azhar Ali who edited the series.

=== Post production and pre-release ===
==== Press conference ====
On 7 April 2016 a press conference was held for Udaari. The programme, hosted by Shanaz Ramzi, CEO Starlinks PR began the proceedings with the series's introduction. Producer Momina Duraid said that some of the actors came out of their comfort zones for the roles that they portrayed. Furthermore, Roshaneh Zafar from Kashf Foundation reflected on common rape cases in Kasur city which led them to produce a screenplay for awarenesses against child-sexual abuse. Director Ehteshamuddin, revealed how challengingvit had been to get the writer, Farhat Ishtiaq to write the script, as not only was the subject a difficult one to portray on screen but it also needed a script that was very close to reality. Bushra Ansari shared her role which is that of a woman who is extremely confident but unrefined, and embodies the real culture of Pakistan's rural areas. She regaled the media present with her quick vivid descriptions and stories painted about the time on set in Mirpur Khas.

== Music ==
Udaari OST

Soundtrack album by Farhan Saeed, Hadiqa Kiani, Bushra Ansari and Maryam Fatima
- Released: 12 April 2016
- Recorded: 2016
- Genre: Television soundtrack
- Languages: Punjabi, Urdu
- Labels: M.D Productions and Kashf Foundation
- Producer: Momina Duraid

The title song of Udaari was composed by musician Sahir Ali Bagga and Sohail Haider, the lyrics were penned down by Imran Raza. The OST was sung by Farhan Saeed and Hadiqa Kiani. It marks the return of Hadiqa Kiani to Hum TV, since she performed for the channel's hit drama series Zindagi Gulzar Hai's title song.

The Soundtrack is produced along with the series production by Momina Duraid and Kashf Productions. The original music was recorded by the production house itself while few songs used in the show were covers of previous classics, including the song Mein Tenu Samjhawanki which was sung by Hadiqa Kiani. Actress Bushra Ansari revamped classic Punjabi Pakistani songs.

Udaari's full OST was released in May 2016. Saajna Ve Saajna received critical acclaim for Sahir Ali Bagga and Sohail Haider for comping and Hadiqa Kiani and Farhan Saeed for vocals. The Series dominated the Top No.1 rank according to Pakistan's Official Music App Taazi. "Mein Tenu Samjhawanki" received critical acclaim and success.

=== Track listing ===
All lyrics are written by Imran Raza; all music is composed by Sahir Ali Bagga & Sohail Haider.

| No. | Title | Artist(s) | Length |
|---|---|---|---|
| 1. | "Sajna ve Sajna" | Hadiqa Kiani & Farhan Saeed | 6:32 |
| 2. | "Alif Allah Chambe di booti" | Bushra Ansari | 2:00 |
| 3. | "Main Tenu Samjhawan" | Hadiqa Kiani | 3:06 |
| 4. | "Udaari (Instrument)" | Hadiqa Kiani & Farhan Saeed | 4:33 |
| 5. | "Kukra Dhamidiya" | Bushra Ansari | 1:19 |
| 6. | "Mere Banre Tey" | Bushra Ansari | 1:10 |
| 7. | "Bol Ke Lab" | Hadiqa Kiani & Farhan Saeed | 4:40 |
| 8. | "Pehli Pehli Vaari" | Bushra Ansari | 2:32 |
| 9. | "Jab Se Mile Tum" | Farhan Saeed | 1:22 |
| Total length: | | | 16:22 |

== Broadcast and release ==
=== Broadcast ===
Udaari was originally decided to release in September after completion of filming in July and post production delays, but instead Production decided to release it in April. With its release, it was initially decided to premiere on 9 April 2016, and air every Saturday night with higher reception, replacing Gul-e-Rana which had maintained the slot with a high viewership for the channel. But to maintain their Sunday slot, the channel instead released Udaari on 10 April 2016, airing every Sunday night, replacing Abro, which was then shifted to Saturdays. The channel aired a weekly episode for approximately 30–45 minutes (without commercials). It was ordered and compromised 25 episodes. It was aired on Hum Europe in UK, on Hum TV USA in USA and Hum TV Mena on UAE, with same timings and premiered date. All International broadcasting aired the series in accordance with their standard times.

=== Homa media and digital release ===
Udaari was released on Hum TV's YouTube channel alongside its airing but in 2017, it was taken off. It was also released on a DVD set on late November 2016. In January 2017, iflix app streamed Udaari on a subscription basis but was pulled off by the channel in 2018. In December 2019, ‘’Udaari’’ was digitally released again by Hum TV on their youtube channel with all its music removed. Furthermore, the show is also available on MX Player.

== Reception ==
=== Ratings ===
| Number of Episodes | Timeslot (PST) | Premiere | | | Finale | | | TV Season | Rank (2016) | Overall viewership (Millions) |
| Number of Episodes | Timeslot (PST) | Date | PAK Viewers (Millions) | Television Rating Points (TRP) | Date | PAK Viewers (Millions) | Television Rating Points (TRP) | TV Season | Rank (2016) | Overall viewership (Millions) |
|---|---|---|---|---|---|---|---|---|---|---|
| 25 | Sundays; 08:00 pm | 10 April 2016 | 19 | 4.9 | 25 September 2016 | 29 | 10 | 2016 | No #1 | 18.67 |

=== Ratings and viewership ===
Hum TV announced the television rating point figures for Udaari through its official Facebook page. The series premiered with 4.9 television rating points (TRPs), a figure matched by its third episode; the fourth and sixth episodes recorded 5.5 and 4.0 TRPs, respectively. Ratings subsequently increased to 7.1 TRPs for the eighth episode and averaged approximately 6 TRPs through the thirteenth episode, before rising to 7.3 for the fourteenth and 7.8 for the fifteenth. Hum TV described Udaari as its most-watched drama during Ramadan, reporting that it outperformed several game shows despite the customary decline in television audiences during the period. The sixteenth episode recorded 6.2 TRPs, followed by 7.3 for the seventeenth and 7.8 for the eighteenth. The twentieth and twenty-first episodes received 6.0 and 6.6 TRPs, respectively. The finale averaged 6.8 TRPs during the 8:00 p.m. hour and 7.9 after 9:00 p.m., with portions of the broadcast reportedly exceeding 10 TRPs. Episode-level audience reports recorded 11.5 million viewers for the eleventh episode and 11.9 million for the twelfth. The eighteenth episode was subsequently reported to have attracted 16.5 million viewers. MediaLogic's monthly television-market reports also consistently ranked Udaari among Pakistan's leading programmes. The second episode attracted a reported audience of 21 million and ranked second both overall and in its timeslot. The fifth episode also attracted 21 million viewers, ranking second overall and first in its timeslot. The eighth and twelfth episodes each reached a reported 27 million viewers, ranking second overall and first in their timeslot. By its eighteenth episode, the series ranked first both overall and in its timeslot, with a reported audience of 27 million; the twenty-second episode retained both rankings with 26 million viewers. The finale was reported to have attracted 30 million viewers and ranked first overall and in its timeslot.

On the rankings of Top ten Pakistani dramas in 2016,Udaari had dominated the No. #2 spot where as another Hum TV series, Mann Mayal dominated the No. #1 position. Both the shows bought a higher reception for the channel. The series competed with Geo TV's most expensive Pakistani series, Mor Mahal which was then shifted to 22:00 slot between the course of show.

=== Episode ranking ===
Udaari episode rankings in the P.A.K. television market
| Episode | Timeslot (PST) | TV season | Rank (overall) | Timeslot Rank | Viewers (millions) |
|---|---|---|---|---|---|
| 2 | Sunday 8:00pm/20:00 | 2016 | #2 | #2 | 21 |
| 5 | Sunday 8:00pm/20:00 | 2016 | #2 | #1 | 21 |
| 8 | Sunday 8:00pm/20:00 | 2016 | #2 | #1 | 27 |
| 12 | Sunday 8:00pm/20:00 | 2016 | #2 | #1 | 27 |
| 18 | Sunday 8:00pm/20:00 | 2016 | #1 | #1 | 27 |
| 22 | Sunday 8:00pm/20:00 | 2016 | #1 | #1 | 26 |
| 25 | Sunday 8:00pm/20:00 | 2016 | #1 | #1 | 30 |

=== Critical appreciation ===
Actors Bushra Ansari and Ahsan Khan earned the most critical acclaim in 2016 for their portrayals. Commenting on his character's acclaim, Khan stated It's a huge honour for me to receive this appreciation from one of the greatest villains of all time. Imtiaz's character was also internationally recognised, earning critical acclaim from Indian artists Reena Roy and Alka Yagnik. Speaking about series reviews from India, Khan states Udaari isn't being aired in India currently but these two stars have been watching my show on YouTube. I really appreciate their love and support.

Writing for Dawn News, Sadaf Haider moderately reviewed the series praising its parody if culture saying, Udaari reads like a brightly colored map of Pakistani society today. Divisions of class and wealth are amply illustrated but so are everyday human interactions. Furthermore, Haider praises the casting stating, Udaari has a strong star cast and it looks as if we will see some great performances. She concluded her review saying that Udaari seems like a safe bet for some informative and enjoyable hour every Sunday. In April issue of The Express Tribune, Udaari was ranked third behind Mann Mayal and Dillagi'.

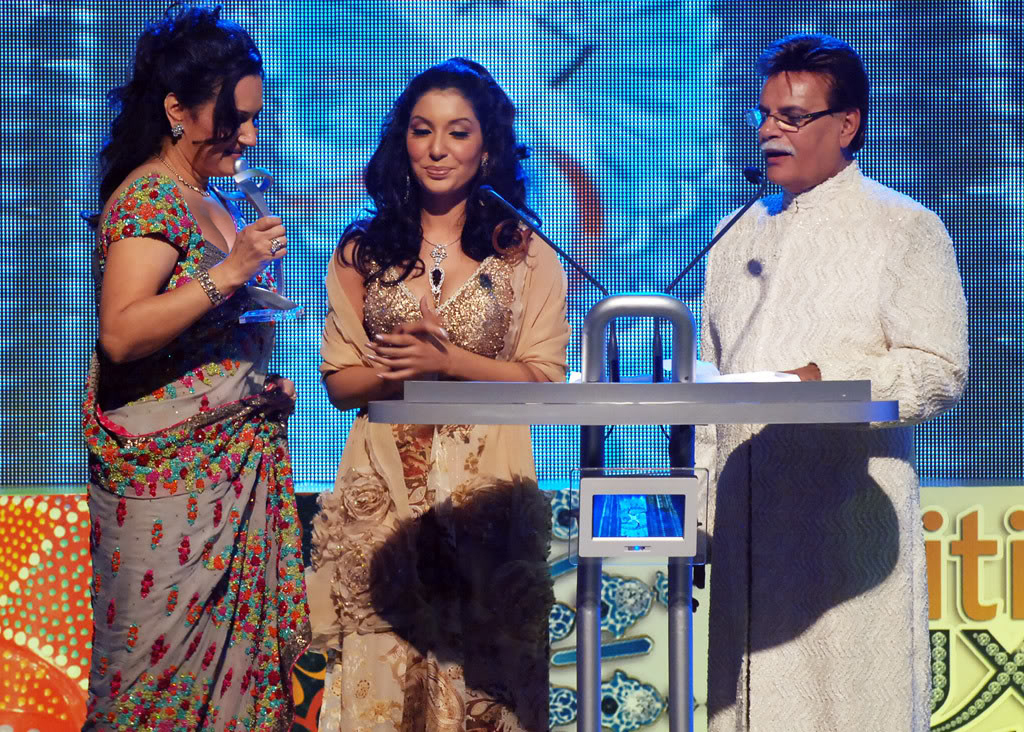
Khan and Bushra Ansari received immense popularity and appraisal for their portrayal of Imtiaz and Sheedan.

However, Sheeba Khan of Dawn praised the series script and characters saying, ..Udaari, gave an astounding opening this week with its larger than life first episode. After watching the serial, one is blown away by the phenomenal acting and superb characterization in this drama. Moreover, Khan praised Udaari's premier and culture saying Udaari has a very impressive opening with flamboyant characters and their dull sides of life. Every actor is immersed into the feel of his and her role, and gives a magnificent performance. All of them have acquired Punjabi accents with so much ease and grace that it will make you think as if they are not just characters, but are real people from an actual rural setting. She concluded her by issue praising Farhat Ishtiaq's writing saying The best part about Udaari is its characterization of each actor, for which the writer Farhat Ishtiaq should be applauded.

Sadaf Haider of Dawn News praised Udaari's direction saying, "Udaari's success lies firmly with director Ehtashamuddin's masterful ability to translate Farhat Ishtiaq's wonderful script flawlessly to the screen. He has elicited some great performances from his team and made sure this wide-ranging storyline did not lose its way". Furthermore, she stated that even after Seven episodes, "Uddari is successfully topping rating charts". Talking about same publication, Sheeba Khan praised the Urban and rural life combination for Dawn's review, Khan states, "The director has managed to extract the best out of all of his actors and has shown a great amount of sensitivity to what should be projected on screen. Sexual abuse is a huge issue in Pakistan, yet for some odd reason has become a taboo and cannot be spoken about". Lastly she praised the theme of child abuse and societal issues by saying, "Pairing a debate on sexual abuse with a commentary on parenting is a smart move, and just shows how, of all the plays running right now, Udaari is not only intelligent and real, it highlights issues in society that need attention so they can be prevented. It shows that victims need not keep quiet and that their families should be their first line of defence". Further more Sadaf Haider praised the roles of Ahsan Khan and Samiya Mumtaz praising Sajida's positivity for her Daughter Zebo, according to her reviews, was Mumtaz's most powerful role, where she portrayed the role of a village women with an extreme powerful getup sparking her role.

Dawn News's article Sadaf Haider praised the Twenty first episode of Udaari with series giving its message, Haider praised the character of Zebo and Arsh stating, "Most significant of all, instead of lecturing Zebo to do the right thing, Arsh becomes a true hero by empowering her and showing her a way to take control of her life. He explains that any shame or guilt is not her burden to carry; all of it should be firmly placed on the perpetrator's shoulders, never the victim's."

While talking to local media about, Urwa Hocane portraying the role of Meera discussed the importance of the drama and social taboos like child abuse and rape. Hocane said, "It's about time for women to talk about this. I think Udaari has brought a change. The people who wanted to ban it couldn't because of the people who wanted the drama to bring about a change. Girls don't speak about such things. I am probably destined to change that mindset." Furthermore, talking about her role of Meera being a local musician, Hocane stated, "I want to change the mindset of people. Bushra jee told me that the word miraasi comes from miraas. You should be proud of it rather than feel horrible about it."

In addition to critical reviews Imtiaz's character received wide media attention and has been a subject of popularity since the beginning, commenting in his role Ahsan Khan stated that "Even while reading the script, I could not digest these scenes. It is definitely the most difficult character to portray on-screen". Moreover, Khan decided to donate 20% of his fee from the serial to the victims of the heinous crime, he also began working with an NGO to make his contributions more substantial and concrete. Khan commented on the series theme "child abuse" stating, "Such abuse leaves the child traumatised forever. My maid's child was suffering from it and that's what made me realise that I need to spread awareness." commenting on critical acclaim Khan stated "It's a huge honour for me to receive this appreciation from one of the greatest villains of all times." Khan's negative role of child molester earned him critical acclaim.

Moreover, Fatima Awan of Review It praised the role of rape-victim Zebo, according to her Udaari played a major role in educating their audience against communal crimes. Apart from sexual abuse, Awan also commented on other societal issues such as politician's negative support and bribing police which plays a major role in societies. The role of Zebo was furthermore praised when Awan stated that every girl should stand for justice and live her life not as a victim but as a survivor. Further more Awan commented on the final episode of Udaari where she praised the roles of Zebo, Sajida, Imtiaz, Arsh, Muneera, Meera and Sheedan. With Arsh (Portrayed by Farhan Saeed) Awan praised the message he gave against child sexual abuse and in favour of Women's rights, she praised the roles of Sajida and Zebo where the two finally sealed justice and Munnera educating her society. According to her review, Udaari has proved to be the major commercial success of 2016.

=== Controversies ===
On 10 May 2016, 'Pakistan Electronic Media Regulatory Authority' (PEMRA) issued a notice against Udaari calming that it had inappropriate content for Television audiences. However, on 25 May 2016 Momina Duraid responded to PEMRA regarding the reality of society and responded the issue, as a result the issue was taken back. Further more Duraid stated that, We feel that Pemra might have been misled by a group of people who would never want our society to raise and flourish. We will explain our view point and present it with evidence. We are attaching articles and feedback supporting Udaari with the our reply. Following this Udaari received support from several audiences and various TV Artists including actress Yumna Zaidi .

=== Legacy and impact ===
Hocane termed her role in the series as "her most impactful role".

Udaari received global recognition due to its tackling the taboo themes with authenticity and sensitivity, which got it huge viewership and global acclaim. Following the success of Udaari, the producers invested in making series on taboo subjects for television such as Khuda Mera Bhi Hai (2016, deals with the status of intersex individuals in the society), Sammi (2017, deals with the evil practice of Vani) which was previously dominated by domestic stories.

=== Awards and accolades ===
| Year | Award | Date | Category | Recipient(s) | Result | Ref. |
|---|---|---|---|---|---|---|
| 2017 | Hum Awards | April 29, 2017; 22 July 2017 (televised) | Best Drama Serial (Jury) | Momina Duraid | Won | |
| 2017 | Hum Awards | April 29, 2017; 22 July 2017 (televised) | Best Drama Serial - Popular | Momina Duraid | Won | |
| 2017 | Hum Awards | April 29, 2017; 22 July 2017 (televised) | Best Director Drama Serial | Mohammed Ehteshamuddin | Won | |
| 2017 | Hum Awards | April 29, 2017; 22 July 2017 (televised) | Best Actor (Jury) | Ahsan Khan | Won | |
| 2017 | Hum Awards | April 29, 2017; 22 July 2017 (televised) | Best Actor in a Negative Role | Ahsan Khan | Won | |
| 2017 | Hum Awards | April 29, 2017; 22 July 2017 (televised) | Best Actor - popular | Ahsan Khan | Nominated | |
| 2017 | Hum Awards | April 29, 2017; 22 July 2017 (televised) | Most Impactful Character | Ahsan Khan | Nominated | |
| 2017 | Hum Awards | April 29, 2017; 22 July 2017 (televised) | Most Impactful Character | Bushra Ansari | Won | |
| 2017 | Hum Awards | April 29, 2017; 22 July 2017 (televised) | Best Actress - Popular | Urwa Hocane | Nominated | |
| 2017 | Hum Awards | April 29, 2017; 22 July 2017 (televised) | Best Supporting Actor | Farhan Saeed | Nominated | |
| 2017 | Hum Awards | April 29, 2017; 22 July 2017 (televised) | Best Writer Drama Serial | Farhat Ishtiaq | Won | |
| 2017 | Hum Awards | April 29, 2017; 22 July 2017 (televised) | Best Original Soundtrack | Sajna ve Sajna by Hadiqa Kiani & Farhan Saeed | Nominated | |
| 2017 | Hum Awards | April 29, 2017; 22 July 2017 (televised) | Best Onscreen Couple - Popular | Farhan Saeed & Urwa Hocane | Nominated | |
| 2017 | Hum Awards | April 29, 2017; 22 July 2017 (televised) | Best Onscreen Couple (Jury) | Farhan Saeed & Urwa Hocane | Won | |
| 2017 | Hum Awards | April 29, 2017; 22 July 2017 (televised) | Honourable Award for Best Child Performance of the Year | Arisha Ahsan | Won | |
| 2017 | Lux Style Awards | July 29, 2016; 20 August 2016 (televised) | Best TV Play | Momina Duraid | Nominated | |
| 2017 | Lux Style Awards | July 29, 2016; 20 August 2016 (televised) | Best TV Director | Mohammed Ehteshamuddin | Won | |
| 2017 | Lux Style Awards | July 29, 2016; 20 August 2016 (televised) | Best Original Soundtrack | Momina Duraid | Nominated | |
| 2017 | Lux Style Awards | July 29, 2016; 20 August 2016 (televised) | Best Actor | Ahsan Khan | Won | |
| 2017 | Lux Style Awards | July 29, 2016; 20 August 2016 (televised) | Best TV Writer | Farhat Ishtiaq | Won | |
| 2017 | IPPA Awards | 20 August 2016 (televised) | Best Actor TV | Ahsan Khan | Won | |
| 2017 | IPPA Awards | 20 August 2016 (televised) | Best TV Director | Mohammed Ehteshamuddin | Won | |
| 2017 | IPPA Awards | 20 August 2016 (televised) | Best Supporting Actor | Farhan Saeed | Nominated | |
| 2017 | IPPA Awards | 20 August 2016 (televised) | Best Soundtrack of the Year | Momina Duraid for Sajna ve Sajna | Nominated | |
| 2017 | IPPA Awards | 20 August 2016 (televised) | Best Actor (Male) | Ahsan Khan | Won | |
| 2017 | IPPA Awards | 20 August 2016 (televised) | Best TV Writer | Farhat Ishtiaq | Won | |
| 2017 | IPPA Awards | 20 August 2016 (televised) | Best on-screen couple | Farhan Saeed & Urwa Hocane | Won | |

== See also ==
- 2016 in Pakistani television
- List of programs broadcast by Hum TV
- Mann Mayal
- Humsafar
- Diyar-e-Dil
- Mata-e-Jaan Hai Tu
