= Ahsan Khan =

British-Pakistani actor and producer (born 1981)

- احسن خان
- Born: 9 October 1981 (age 45); London, England
- Citizenship: Pakistan, United Kingdom
- Education: Master's degree in English Literature
- Alma mater: Government College University, Lahore
- Occupations: Actor; television producer; television host; television performer
- Years active: 1998–present
- Employer(s): Various film and television productions
- Agent: https://www.astservices.tech
- Known for: Work in Pakistani television dramas and films
- Notable work: Dastaan (2010); Udaari (2016)
- Style: Drama, Comedy, Action
- Spouse: Fatima Ahsan
- Awards: Multiple Nominations at Lux Style Awards
- Honours: CLF Goodwill Ambassador (2019)
- Website: https://astservices.tech/ahsan-khan-actor-host-model-influencer/

Ahsan Khan (Urdu: احسن خان; born 9 October 1981) is a British Pakistani actor, producer and TV host.

He began acting in 1998 at the age of 16 with the film Nikah. He appeared in the films Billi, Ghar Kab Aao Gay, Sultanat, Ishq Khuda, Dil Mera Dhadkan Teri and later moved on to television.

He hosted a quiz show Hayya Allal Falah, during Ramadan. Ahsan Khan has also hosted Ramadan transmission for several years which airs on PTV Home named Ramazan Pakistan.

Khan was appointed as a CLF Goodwill Ambassador by the Children's Literature Festival on 30 July 2019.

== Early life and education ==
He was born in London on 9 October 1981, into a family of seven; a father of half-Pashtun heritage, a mother who is Punjabi descent, an elder brother, two elder sisters, and a twin brother, who is an author and poet (Yasir Khan) from London. He is the only one to have gone into acting, and when his family moved back to Lahore, he earned a master's degree in English literature at Government College University.

== Career ==
=== Actor ===
In 2008, Khan played Mangal Singh, a carefree Sikh villlager in the drama Muthi Bhar Chaawal, and found his part tough.

In 2012, Khan played Tabraiz in the romnce-drama Meri Ladli whcih became among the highest-rated television serials of the year. The same year, he portrayed a middle-class Karachi boy who persuades an American girl to get Green card in the drama Emaan.

He received acclaim for his role in the 2016 drama Udaari, portraying the negative role of a child abuser and sexual predator.

In 2017, he starred in the romantic-comedy film Chupan Chupai opposite Neelam Muneer. The film was a commercial success. His performance in the film earned him a nomination for Lux Style Award for Best Film Actor.

In 2019, he played a pivotal role in the acclaimed television series Alif. That same year, he played the eponymous character in comedy series Shahrukh Ki Saliyan, opposite Ramsha Khan.

=== Producer ===
Since 2016, he has also turned to production, with the socially relevant series Dukh Sukh, being "tired of the same old 'saas bahu' dramas", and as of 2018, had produced more than twenty works for television.

=== Host ===
He hosted a quiz show, Hayya Allal Falah, on Hum TV in 2011, during Ramadan.

=== Musician ===
In 2013, Khan ventured into singing when he performed the title song for the television drama series Khoya Khoya Chand. He was encouraged by the drama's director, Fahim Burney, after being heard humming on set, and was subsequently offered the opportunity to sing the soundtrack. The song, a romantic duet, was recorded alongside singer Dua Malik and received a positive response following the drama's release.

In 2021, he performed the Punjabi song "Torr" for the first season of the music television series Kashmir Beats. The song featured Khan as the lead vocalist alongside Bismah Abdullah and formed part of the show's concept of highlighting contemporary Punjabi music through high-production studio performances.

== Filmography ==
=== Films ===
Year	Title	Role	Notes	Ref(s)
1998	Nikah			
2000	Billi			
2000	Ghar Kab Aao Gay	Captain Amir		
2013	Ishq Khuda	Ahsan		
2013	Dil Mera Dhadkan Teri	Saad		
2014	Sultanat			
2016	Chashm e Num	Shahid	Short film	
2016	Moomal Rano	Jamaal	Short film	
2017	Chupan Chupai	Babu		
2018	Tick Tock	Voice role	Animated film	
2022	Chakkar	Kabir		
2022	Rehbra	Danish		

=== Television series ===
Year	Title	Role	Network	Notes	Ref(s)
2003	Sehra		PTV		
2003	Duniya Dari		PTV	Directed by Javed Fazil	
2003	Singhar		PTV	Directed by Javed Fazil, written by Seema Ghazal	
2004	Chashmaan		PTV		
2004	Ana		Geo Entertainment	Directed by S. Suleman, written by Seema Ghazal	
2004	Ajnabi Raste Ajnabi Manzilein		PTV	Nominated in PTV Awards 2006 for Best Actor	
2005	Beti	Kamaal	PTV		
2005	Khawab Nagar		PTV		
2005	Safaid Posh	Sameer	Geo Entertainment	Directed by Syed Faisal Bukhari	
2005	Mehndi wale haath	Akbar	Geo Entertainment		
2005	Sitam		PTV	PTV's first soap	
2005	Aah		ATV		
2006	Gharoor	Haris	PTV	Written by Hassan Nisar	
2006	Banjar		Geo Entertainment		
2006	Band Darwaze		PTV	Written by Naheed Naz, produced by Imran Gul, directed by Rajaz	
2006	Sharbati		PTV		
2006	Chingarian		PTV		
2006	Barson Baad	Asif	PTV	Directed by Syed Faisal Bukhari	
2006	Saat Sur Rishton Ke	Waseem	PTV	Directed by Syed Ahmad Kamran	
2006	Diya Sath Chand Lamhon Ka	Rehaan	PTV		
2006	Chashman	Shahnoor	Aaj TV		
2007	Muqaddas	Rehaan	ARY Digital		
2007	Rishtay		ATV		
2007	Awaaz		PTV	Asif Ali Pota Production	
2008	Kagaz Kay Phool		PTV		
2008	Bint e Adam		PTV	Directed By Shahid Zahoor, Written by Wasi Shah	
2008	Muthi Bhar Chaawal	Mangal Singh	TV One Pakistan		
2008	Sill		ATV		
2009	Saiqa	Rehaan	Hum TV		
2009	Koonj		Geo Entertainment		
2009	Kaahe ko Biyahe Badais	Salman Ali Awan	Geo Entertainment		
2009	Dil Dard Dhuwaan		ARY Digital		
2009	Muhabbat Yun Bhi Hoti Hai	Kabir	A-Plus Entertainment		
2010	Din Dhallay	Saim	PTV		
2010	Chatt		PTV		
2010	Imtehan		PTV		
2010	Vasl	Adeel	Hum TV		
2010	Dastaan	Saleem	Hum TV		
2010	Parsa	David Agarwal	Hum TV		
2011	Pani Jaisa Piyar	Saad	Hum TV		
2011	Tera Pyar Nahi Bhoole	Hadi	PTV		
2011	Takkay ki Ayegi Baraat	Azar	Geo Entertainment		
2011	Neeyat	Ismail	ARY Digital		
2011	Ik Yaad Hai		A-Plus Entertainment		
2011	Omar Dadi aur Gharwale	Ahmed	ARY Digital		
2011	Payal		PTV		
2012	Mere Qatil Mere Dildar	Umar	Hum TV		
2012	Bilqees Kaur	Sultan	Hum TV		
2012	Meri Ladli	Tabraiz	ARY Digital		
2012	Emaan	Aazi Ullah	Express Entertainment		
2012	Na Kaho Tum Mere Nahi	Meerab	Hum TV		
2012	Mata-e-Jaan Hai Tu	Adeel	Hum TV		
2012	Dil Say Dil Tak		PTV	Directed by Syed Faisal Bukhari	
2012	Annie Ki Ayegi Baraat	Azar	Geo Entertainment		
2012	Mirat Ul Uroos	Hashim	Geo Entertainment		
2013	Heer Ranjha	Ranjha	PTV	Based on Waris Shah's Heer Ranjha (1766)	
2013	Khoya Khoya Chand	Aarib	Hum TV	Also co-sung the OST Mehki Mehki	
2013	Mujhe Khuda Pe Yaqeen Hai	Arham	Hum TV		
2013	Gohar-e-Nayab	Sami	A-Plus Entertainment		
2013	Meri Zindagi Hai Tu	Aman	Geo Entertainment		
2013	Kabhi Kabhi	Araiz	ARY Digital		
2014	Qudrat	Momin	ARY Digital		
2014	Mausam	Hashir	Hum TV		
2014	Marasim	Daud	A-Plus Entertainment		
2014	Zid	Umer	Hum TV		
2014	Chupkay Say Bahaar Aa Jaye	Mazhar	A-Plus Entertainment	Also Producer	
2015	Tumhare Siwa	Aazar	Hum TV		
2015	Preet Na Kariyo Koi	Shams	Hum TV		
2016	Udaari	Imtiaz Sheikh	Hum TV	Negative role	
2016	Saya-e-Dewar Bhi Nahi	Haider Shah	Hum TV	Directed by Shahzad Kashmiri	
2017	Haasil	Junaid	Geo Entertainment		
2018	Maryam Periera	Ali Khan	PTV / TVOne		
2018	Aangan	Safdar/Subhan	Hum TV	Based on the novel of Khadija Mastoor about the 1947 partition	
2019	Shahrukh Ki Saliyan	Shahrukh	Geo Entertainment	Comedy play written by Muhammad Younis Butt	
2019	Alif	Taha Abul Ala	Geo Entertainment	Based on Sufi Islam, written by Umera Ahmed	
2020	Bandhay Aik Dor Say	Umar	Geo Entertainment		
2021	Qayamat	Rashid	Geo Entertainment		
2021	Qissa Meherbano Ka	Murad	Hum TV	Negative role	
2022	Meray Humnasheen	Darakhzai	Geo Entertainment		
2022	Fraud	Shujaat "Shajji" Atray/Tabraiz Khawar/Choudhary Hashim	ARY Digital	Negative role	
2023	Hum Dono	Omer	Express Entertainment	Mini-series	
2023	Mujhay Qabool Nahi	Atir	Geo Entertainment		
2023	Sukoon	Hamdan Rashid	ARY Digital		
2025	Dayan	Zawar Shah	Geo Entertainment		
2026	Zanjeerain	Sherdil	Hum TV		
2026	Aap Ki Izzat	Tabish	Hum TV		

=== Telefilms ===
Year	Title	Role	Network	Ref(s)
2024	Pyaar Tou Warh Gaya		Geo Entertainment	
2024	Apna Pan		Aan TV	
2025	Mohabbat Youn Bhi Honi Thi		Hum TV	

=== Web series ===
Year	Title	Role	Network	Notes	Ref(s)
2021	Qatil Haseenaon Ke Naam	Gulab	ZEE5	Supporting role	

=== Reality shows ===
Year	Title	Role	Network	Notes
2013	Madventures	Host	ARY Digital	Gameshow based on Fear Factor
2015–2016	Asia's Singing Superstar	Host	Zee TV	Co-host Shweta Pandit
2017	Knorr Noodles Boriyat Busters	Host	Geo Entertainment	Children's game show
2019–2020	Bol Nights with Ahsan Khan	Host	BOL Network	Talkshow
2020	Game Show Aisay Chalay Ga League	Captain (Lahore Leopards)	BOL Network	Won
2021–2022	Time Out with Ahsan Khan	Host	Express Entertainment	Talkshow

=== Music videos ===
Year	Title	Artist	Ref
2015	"Urain Ge"	Ali Zafar	
2020	"Ye Watan Tumhara Hai"	Various	
2020	"Kab Aaoge"	Ahsan Khan and Maheen Raheel	

== Awards and nominations ==
Year	Award	Category	Work	Result	Ref(s)
2008	7th Lux Style Awards	Best TV Actor (Satellite)	Muqaddas	Nominated	
2010	9th Lux Style Awards	Best TV Actor (Terrestrial)	Mohabat Yun Bhi Hoti Hai	Nominated	
2011	10th Lux Style Awards	Best TV Actor (Terrestrial)	Shikan	Nominated	
2012	11th Lux Style Awards	Best TV Actor (Terrestrial)	Tera Pyar Nahi Bhoole	Nominated	
2012	17th PTV Awards	Best Actor (Jury)	Tera Pyar Nahi Bhoole	Nominated	
2012	1st Hum Awards	Best Actor	Mere Qatil Mere Dildar	Nominated	
2013	2nd Hum Awards	Best Actor	Mujhe Khuda Pe Yaqeen Hai	Nominated	
2013	Pakistan Media Awards	Best Actor	Emaan	Nominated	
2014	3rd Hum Awards	Best Actor	Mausam	Won	
2014	1st ARY Film Awards	Best Actor	Ishq Khuda	Nominated	
2014	13th Lux Style Awards	Best TV Play (Terrestrial)	Mar Jayen Hum Toh Kiya	Won	
2016	5th Hum Awards	Best Actor	Udaari	Won	
2017	16th Lux Style Awards	Best TV Actor	Udaari	Won	
2018	17th Lux Style Awards	Best Lead Actor in a Film	Chupan Chupai	Nominated	
2020	1st Pakistan International Screen Awards	Best Television Actor in Comedy Role	Shahrukh Ki Saliyan	Nominated	
2022	8th Hum Awards	Best Actor - Popular	Qissa Meherbano Ka	Nominated	
2022	8th Hum Awards	Best Performance in a Negative Role	Qissa Meherbano Ka	Won	
2023	1st Kya Drama Hai Icon Awards	Best Actor Mini-series	Hum Dono	Nominated	
2023	1st Kya Drama Hai Icon Awards	Best Performance in a Negative Role (Popular Choice)	Fraud	Won	

== Other recognitions ==
Year	Award	Category	Work	Ref(s)
2021	The Random ‘Year That Was 2021’ Gloss Etc Awards	'Bring On The Gossip’ Awards	Time Out with Ahsan Khan	
2021	The Random ‘Year That Was 2021’ Gloss Etc Awards	Best Villain Award	Qissa Meherbano Ka	
2022	The Random ‘Year That Was 2022’ Gloss Etc Awards	Here, there, everywhere! Award	Meray Humnasheen	
