= Hurmat =

2026 Pakistani television series

- Opening title card
- حرمت
- Genre: Family drama Social drama Romance
- Written by: Kashif Anwar
- Directed by: Nadeem Siddique
- Starring: Dananeer Mobeen; Shahveer Jafry; Ali Tahir; Javed Sheikh; Uzma Hassan
- Country of origin: Pakistan
- Original language: Urdu
- No. of seasons: 1
- No. of episodes: 14

Production
- Producer: Momina Duraid
- Production locations: Karachi, Pakistan
- Camera setup: Multi-camera setup
- Running time: 35 minutes
- Production company: Momina Duraid Productions

Original release
- Network: HUM TV
- Release: 5 October 2026 – present

Hurmat (transl. Respect) is a 2026 Pakistani Urdu-language television drama series written by Kashif Anwar, directed by Nadeem Siddiqui, and produced by Momina Duraid under Momina Duraid Productions. The series stars Dananeer Mobeen and Shahveer Jafry in the title role alongside Ali Tahir, Javed Sheikh, Farah Sadia and Uzma Hassan. It premiered on HUM TV on 5 October 2026. The story follows Hurmat, a young woman whose pursuit of higher education and independence conflicts with the restrictive authority of her father.

== Premise ==
Hurmat (Dananeer Mobeen) is a young woman who wishes to pursue higher education but faces restrictions imposed by her conservative father (Ali Tahir), who controls her movements and prevents her from attending university. Her paternal uncle (Javed Sheikh) helps her pursue her education, allowing her to experience life beyond the confines of her home. She meets Tabish (Shahveer Jafry), a assistant commissioner whom she develops a romantic relationship.

Hurmat soon gets engaged to Tabish and he opens up to her about her childhood trauma, his parent's divorce and losing his father to cancer. This upsets Hurmat and she instantly loses interest and fears that his childhood trauma would affect their future. She starts ignoring Tabish, who on the other hand has fallen head over heels for her.

== Cast ==
- Dananeer Mobeen as Hurmat
- Shahveer Jafry as Tabish
- Ali Tahir as Akram
  - Fazal Hussain as young Akram
- Javed Sheikh as Wasif
- Anoushay Abbasi
- Omair Rana
- Uzma Hassan as Nafeesa
- Farah Sadia
- Shahbaz Shigri as Shahzad
- Muajha Kashif as Fenny
- Raheen Basharat as Kenny
- Mohammad Ahmed
- Sana Humayun

== Production ==
Dananeer Mobeen was cast in the title role of Hurmat, alongside Shahveer Jafry as Tabish. Kashif Anwar's previous television writing credits include Sabaat (2020), Neem (2023) and Nauroz (2023), which also explore themes including social class, family relationships and social issues. The teaser was released on 4 September 2026. Hurmat premiered on HUM TV on 5 October 2026 and airs on Mondays and Tuesdays at 8:00 p.m. Pakistan Standard Time.

== Reception ==
Hurmat received a positive response from viewers following its premiere, with much of the early praise directed towards Dananeer Mobeen's performance as the title character. Viewers appreciated her portrayal of Hurmat's innocence, fear and lack of confidence, particularly in scenes showing her life under the strict control of her father. The casting of Shahveer Jafry also became a topic of discussion, as the drama marked his television acting debut. While some viewers welcomed his appearance, others expressed reservations about his performance in a serious role. Dawn Images reported that Mobeen was grateful for the appreciation she received but felt sad after reading comments from viewers who could relate to Hurmat's circumstances. One viewer shared that their father had painted the windows of their home to prevent the family from looking outside. The response brought attention to the real-life experiences reflected in the drama.

Daily Times reported mixed audience reactions to Hurmat's changing feelings towards Tabish, with some viewers criticising her decision while others defended her right to reconsider the relationship.
