= Manzar Sehbai =

Pakistani actor (born 1950)

- Born: 19 March 1950 (age 76); Sialkot, Punjab, Pakistan
- Occupation: Actor
- Years active: 1972–present
- Spouse: Samina Ahmad (m. 2020)
- Relatives: Sarmad Sehbai (brother)

Manzar Sehbai (born 19 March 1950) is a Pakistani actor who appears in Lollywood films and serials. He has worked in different drama serials and made his film debut in 2011 with Shoaib Mansoor's Bol for which he won Lux Style Awards and SAARC Film Awards. In 2013, he appeared in Zinda Bhaag, Pakistan's entry for Best Foreign Language Film in 2013's Academy Awards.

== Personal life ==
Sehbai was born in Sialkot. His father was Asar Sehbai, a public prosecutor who was posted to Lahore when Sehbai was very young. He attended Junior Model School, Lahore and graduated from Government College Lahore. He went on to obtain Master’s in English from the same college. He is the brother of director and poet Sarmad Sehbai. He went to East Germany for higher education and lived in Germany from 1976 to 2011. He married actress Samina Ahmad in a private Nikah ceremony on 4 April 2020 in Lahore.

== Career ==
Sehbai started his acting career during his college life as part of the renowned Government College Dramatic Club (GCDC) where he worked together with Usman Peerzada and Salman Shahid in the Urdu-language play 'Darkroom'. He first appeared in the telefilm Paani Ke Qaidi and then Ki Janaan Main Kaun and many more. He made his film debut in 2011 with Shoaib Mansoor's Bol opposite Humaima Malick, Mahira Khan, Atif Aslam and Iman Ali for which he won Lux Style Awards and SAARC Film Awards.

== Filmography ==
=== Television ===
- Toba Tek Singh (2006)
- Alif (2019)
- Neem (2023)
- Nauroz (2023)
- Duniyapur (2024)

=== Films ===
Year	Film	Role	Notes
2011	Bol	Hakim Sahib	Lux Style Awards; SAARC Film Awards
2013	Zinda Bhaag	Sadiq	Cameo Appearance
2014	Ya Rab	Dr.Mazhar	Indian film
2016	Mah-e-Meer	Dr. Kaleem	
2017	Lies We Tell	Zulfikar	
2021	Khel Khel Mein	Karamullah	
2024	Umro Ayyar - A New Beginning	Guro	

=== Web series ===
Year	Title	Role	Platform	Notes
2021	Dhoop Ki Deewar	Sarah's grandfather	ZEE5	
