= Amr Kashmiri =

Pakistani actor, Teacher and musician

Amir Kashmiri
- Born: Amir Kashmiri {{Birth date and age|1996|07| 12| Azad Kashmir Pakistan
- Occupations: Film tv Editor, Director,
- Years active: 2011–present

Amir Kashmiri (born 12 July 1996) is a Pakistani-born actor and Film Editor who appears in Pakistani films. He made his film debut in 2011 with Shoaib Mansoor's Bol for which he won a London Asian Film Festival award.

== Early life ==
Amir was born in , Pakistan. He is the son of Pakistani educators Saleem A. Kashmiri (former head master of Aitchison College and Dr. Nosheena Saleem (former principal of College of Home Economics, Lahore). He is currently teaching in TNS Beaconhouse.

== Career ==
Kashmiri is a well-known Film and tv Editor, Director and a theater actor. He got a call from Shoaib Mansoor and was selected for the role of Saifi opposite Humaima Malick, Iman Ali, Mahira Khan and Atif Aslam. He won London Asian Film Festival and British Academy Film Awards for Bol.

== Filmography ==
Year	Film	Role	Award
2011	Bol	Saifi	London Asian Film Festival

=== Awards ===
Year	Film	Award	Category	Result
2012	Bol	London Asian Film Festival	Best New Talent	Won
