= Mera Lyari =

2026 Pakistani sports drama film

- Promotional poster
- Urdu: میرا لیاری
- Directed by: Abu Aleeha
- Written by: Abu Aleeha
- Produced by: Waqas Hassan Rizvi; Sania Sohail
- Starring: Ayesha Omar; Dananeer Mobeen; Trinette Lucas; Samiya Mumtaz; Nayyar Ejaz; Adnan Shah Tipu
- Production company: Hawksbay Studios
- Distributed by: Distribution Club
- Release dates: May 2, 2026 (UKAFF); May 8, 2026 (Pakistan)
- Running time: 95 minutes
- Country: Pakistan
- Language: Urdu

Mera Lyari (Urdu: میرا لیاری) is a 2026 Pakistani sports drama film written and directed by Abu Aleeha and produced by Waqas Hassan Rizvi and Sania Sohail. It stars Ayesha Omar, Dananeer Mobeen, Trinette Lucas, Samiya Mumtaz, Nayyar Ejaz, and Adnan Shah Tipu. The film follows two girls from Lyari who pursue football while facing family and social restrictions.

The film had its world premiere at the UK Asian Film Festival in London on 2 May 2026 and was released theatrically in Pakistan on 8 May 2026. The film was backed by the Sindh government and announced by officials as a response to Dhurandhar, which they said misrepresented Lyari.

== Plot ==
The film follows two girls in Lyari who pursue football despite family and social restrictions. Afsana defies her authoritarian father, while the orphan Kushmala faces a forced marriage. Guided by a one-legged former football captain, they train in secret for a chance to join the Pakistan Football League.

== Cast ==
- Ayesha Omar as Behnaz Baloch
- Dananeer Mobeen as Afsana Baloch
- Trinette Lucas as Kushmala
- Samiya Mumtaz as Shakira
- Nayyar Ejaz as Arif Baloch
- Paras Masroor
- Adnan Shah Tipu as Faiq Khan
- Shoaib Hassan

== Production ==
The film was initially developed under the title Behnaz, with Dananeer Mobeen reported to be making her film debut alongside Ayesha Omar in Abu Aleeha's sports thriller. Principal photography took place in Lyari and concluded in July 2025.

Abu Aleeha said the film had been completed and locked three months before the teaser for the 2025 Indian film Dhurandhar was released. He said that Mera Lyari was shot entirely in Lyari and that around 80 percent of its cast consisted of Lyari residents, including lead actor Shoaib Hassan, supporting actors, and local football-team members.

The film was later retitled Mera Lyari after Sindh Information Minister Sharjeel Memon announced the Sindh government's backing for the project in response to Dhurandhar, which he said misrepresented Lyari. Memon later said the film had been made on a small budget as part of the provincial government's support for local film projects.

In an interview with the Pakistani "The News" published around the film's release, Abu Aleeha said that the idea for Mera Lyari began about four years earlier while he was auditioning performers for Dadaal and observed girls playing football near Sarbazi Ground in Lyari. He said he wanted to make a film about the neighbourhood's children rather than its hardships. Aleeha also said that the film was shot on location in Lyari and that many of the female athletes appearing in it were actual footballers from the area.

Aleeha said he cast real footballers because he felt that authentic athleticism would be harder to simulate than performance skills. He described his approach as avoiding rigid staging and allowing non-professional performers to respond naturally to the emotional context of scenes.

== Marketing ==
The film was first announced on 13 December 2025 by Sharjeel Memon, who described it as a project centred on Lyari and positioned it in response to contemporary regional narratives. After the film's screening at the UK Asian Film Festival, Dananeer Mobeen said that reducing Mera Lyari to a response to Dhurandhar was a disservice to the film, stating that it explored Lyari, football culture, female football culture, women in sports, and South Asian women in sports.

First-look posters featuring principal characters were unveiled the following day by Ayesha Omar, who described the film as a labour of love.

The film's first trailer was released in April 2026. Coverage of the trailer noted that it foregrounded girls in Lyari playing football while facing domestic and social pressure, and positioned the film around themes of resilience, identity, and female empowerment. The Express Tribune reported that the trailer drew online praise, particularly for Dananeer Mobeen's portrayal of Afsana Baloch and the film's representation of Lyari.

Ahead of the film's UK Asian Film Festival premiere, Ayesha Omar said that Mera Lyari was not intended to counter another film, but to tell a story rooted in Lyari's community, culture, resilience, and sporting identity.

== Reception ==
=== Critical reception ===
Mera Lyari received mixed-to-negative reviews from critics, who widely praised Dananeer Mobeen's debut performance but criticized the film's script, pacing, and limited focus on football.

Richard Maguire of The Reviews Hub reviewed the film following its screening at the UK Asian Film Festival and gave it a 25% rating. He wrote that while the film addressed important issues, it lacked nuance, citing its "broad villains and simple redemptions." Maguire also noted that the film's use of music and melodrama might alienate some Western audiences, though he described Mobeen's performance as consistently strong.

Mohammad Kamran Jawaid of Dawn criticized the film's thin story, limited football content, editing, and music cues, while identifying Mobeen's debut as its principal strength. He also praised Asrad Khan's cinematography, the minimalist production design, and the surround-sound mastering.

Shayan Obaid Alexander, writing for ProPakistani Lens, criticized the character development, screenplay, pacing, dialogue, and background score, arguing that the film placed too little emphasis on football. He praised Mobeen's performance, Paras Masroor's supporting role, and aspects of the sets and wardrobe, but concluded that it did not succeed as a sports film.

Ozair Majeed of Pakistani Cinema praised Mobeen's debut performance as Afsana Baloch, noting that despite being hindered by a weak script, she was the film's standout element, confidently executing the character's regional accent, mannerisms, and emotional range.

Sibte Hassan of Nukta gave the film five out of ten. He praised Mobeen's performance, particularly her use of the Lyari dialect and physical commitment to the role, but criticized the flashback-heavy structure, limited use of music, flat football sequences, post-production choices, and abrupt ending.

== Accolades ==
Year	Award / Film Festival	Category	Recipient(s)	Result	Ref.
2026	Open Eurasian Film Awards (Diamond Butterfly Awards)	Best Actress	Dananeer Mobeen	Won	

== See also ==
- List of Pakistani films of 2026
