= Mawra Hocane =

Pakistani actress (born 1992)

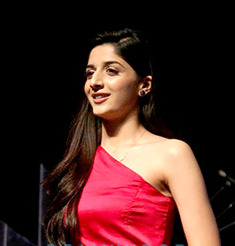
- Hocane promoting Sanam Teri Kasam in 2016
- Born: Mawra Hussain; 28 September 1992 (age 34); Karachi, Sindh, Pakistan
- Education: University of London (LL.B)
- Occupations: Actress; model
- Years active: 2011–present
- Spouse: Ameer Gilani (m. 2025)
- Children: 1 - Syed Azmar Hussain Kamal Gilani
- Relatives: Urwa Hocane (sister); Farhan Saeed (brother-in-law)

Mawra Hussain (Urdu: ماورہ حسین; born 28 September 1992), known professionally as Mawra Hocane, is a Pakistani actress who primarily works in Urdu television. She made her acting debut in 2011 with Khichari Salsa. She made her Bollywood debut with the romantic tragedy, Sanam Teri Kasam (2016) and her Pakistani film debut with the comedy drama Jawani Phir Nahi Ani 2 (2018).

Hocane has received praise for her portrayals of Nadia in Ek Tamanna Lahasil Si (2012), Haya in Aahista Aahista (2014), Sammi in Sammi (2017), Anaya Aziz in Sabaat (2020), and Mehrbano in Qissa Meherbano Ka (2021). She won Hum Award for Best Actress for her performance in Neem.

== Early life and family ==
Hocane was born as Mawra Hussain on 28 September 1992 in Karachi, Sindh. Actress Urwa Hocane is her elder sister, while actor Farhan Saeed is her brother-in-law.

In 7th grade, she started spelling her family name as "Hocane" to give it a unique form. She holds a degree in law from the University of London, which she finished after returning to school.

== Career ==
Hocane performed as a theatre artist before working as a VJ at ARY Musik. She made her acting debut in 2011 with the drama Khichari Salsa. She acted in the dramas Aahista Aahista, Ik Tamanna Lahasil Si, and Nikhar Gaye Gulab Sare. In 2014, she portrayed the titular role of Bushra in ARY Digital's Mein Bushra as a determined and capable daughter of a strict father. Hocane termed the project among her favourites.

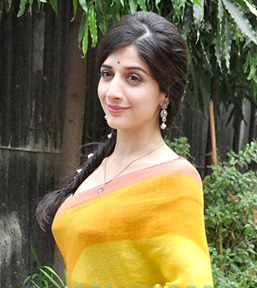
Hocane on Sanam Teri Kasam set

Hocane made her Hindi film debut with the romantic tragedy Sanam Teri Kasam opposite Harshvardhan Rane. She portrayed a South Indian girl who works as a librarian. Hindustan Times noted, "Mawra is a delight to watch as Saru. She slips into the demure character with ease and her get-up certainly adds to her persona.", while News18 mentioned her as "one of the most incredible performer."

In 2018, she made her Pakistani film debut with the romantic comedy Jawani Phir Nahi Ani 2 opposite Fahad Mustafa. The film is the second-highest-grossing Pakistani film worldwide. Pakistan Today noted, "Mawra is a good addition to the film and she nailed her character of a spoilt, young heiress."

From 2018 to 2019, she narrated and appeared in the period drama Aangan based on Khadija Mastoor's novel of the same name. Hocane portrayed a resilient Hindustani who endures bitter experiences in love. In 2019, she appeared as the juvenile and bubbly Sunehri in Daasi. Her next role of a headstrong and ambitious university student in Sabaat earned her dual nominations of Best TV Actress at the 20th Lux Style Awards. In 2021, she played the title role of a victim of domestic abuse and marital rape in the drama Qissa Meherbano Ka. Her first role in 2023 was of a determined philanthropist Zimal Riyasat in the romance-drama Neem. For his performance in the series, she won her first award, Hum Award for Best Actress, at the 9th Hum Awards. She later appeared in the teen-drama Nauroz as an innocent teen Rishtina who discovers the world after spending twenty years of her life in a basement. Hocane had her first role in 2024 in the comedy Let's Try Mohabbat, where she portrayed a newlywed bride who changes the perspectives of her in-laws with her arrival. Her next role that year was in the drama Jafaa as a gynecologist Dr. Zara who copes with her troubled marriage. In 2025, she appeared in the romance Agar Tum Sath Ho, along with her husband Ameer Gilani in their third on-screen appearance. In the same year, Hocane appeared in the family-drama Jama Taqseem where she depicted a modren daughter-in-law of a joint family.

== Personal life ==
Hocane met actor Ameer Gilani on the sets of Sabaat in 2020. On 5 February 2025, Hocane married Gilani in a traditional Muslim wedding in Lahore.

== Other work and media image ==
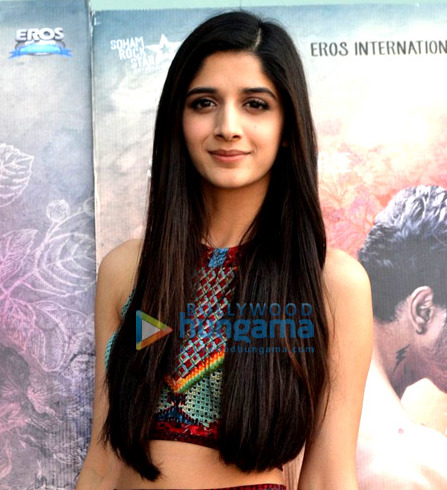
Hocane at an event in 2016

Hocane has established herself as one of the leading Urdu television actresses. In 2016, Hocane ranked 6th in "HIP Top 10" list for her "strong and vocal personality". Hocane modelled in "Hum Bridal Couture Week" in 2018, for designer Nilofer Shahid. She was the show stopper for designer HSY creation. She has also done various photoshoots for "Eid Collections" and for designers. She serves as an ambassador for a number of brands such as Glow & Lovely and Lay's.

Hocane launched her clothing line named "UXM", in collaboration with her sister Urwa Hocane, in June 2019. In 2022, she also launched her own YouTube channel named "M Live".

Hocane once tweeted in support of 2015 Indian film Phantom, which was banned in Pakistan, prompting social media harassment.

== Filmography ==
Key
†	denotes film / drama that has not released yet

=== Films ===
Year	Title	Role	Director	Language	Notes	Ref(s)
2016	Sanam Teri Kasam	Saraswati "Saru" Parthasarthy	Radhika Rao, Vinay Sapru	Hindi	Bollywood Film Debut	
2018	Jawani Phir Nahi Ani 2	Zoe	Nadeem Baig	Urdu	Pakistani Film Debut	

=== Television ===
Year	Serial	Role	Network	Director	Notes	Ref(s)
2011	Khichari Salsa		A-Plus TV		Debut	
2011	Love Ke Chucker Mein					
2011	Kountry Luv		A-Plus TV			
2012	Mere Huzoor	Amna	Express Entertainment			
2012	Ik Tamanna Lahasil Si	Nadia	Hum TV			
2012	Nikhar Gaye Gulab Sare	Sheharyal	Hum TV			
2012	Yahan Pyar Nahin Hai	Shumaila	Hum TV			
2012	Ghar Aae Mehman	Ainee	Hum TV		Telefilm	
2012	Main Gunehgar Nahi	Amaara	ARY Digital			
2013	Halki si Khalish		Hum TV			
2013	Mere Harjai	Maha	ARY Digital			
2014	Billo Bablu Aur Bhaiyya		ARY Digital	Bilal Qureshi, Ahmed Bhatti		
2014	Mein Bushra	Bushra	ARY Digital	Bilal Qureshi, Ahmed Bhatti		
2014	Meri Wife Ke Liye		ARY Digital			
2014	Aahista Aahista	Haya	Hum TV	Haseeb Hassan		
2014	Kitni Girhain Baaki Hain		Hum TV	Angeline Malik	Anthology Series	
2015	Shareek-e-Hayat		Hum TV	Haseeb Ali, Wajid Raza		
2015	Papa Razi		ARY Digital	Mohammed Iftikhar	Short Telefilm	
2015	Maryam	Maryam	Geo Entertainment	Syed Ali Raza Usama		
2015	Bhanwar	Zara	Hum TV	Badar Mehmood	Telefilm	
2016	Haasil	Hareem	Geo Entertainment	Abdullah Badini		
2017	Sammi	Sammi	Hum TV	Saife Hassan		
2018	Aangan	Aliya	Hum TV	Mohammed Ehteshamuddin		
2019	Daasi	Sunehri	Hum TV	Mohsin Talat		
2020	Sabaat	Anaya Aziz	Hum TV	Shahzad Kashmiri		
2021	Qissa Meherbano Ka	Mehrbano	Hum TV	Iqbal Hussain		
2023	Neem	Zimal Riyasat	Hum TV	Shahzad Kashmiri		
2023	Nauroz	Rishtina	Green Entertainment	Shahzad Kashmiri		
2024	Let's Try Mohabbat	Fizza Chaudhary	Green Entertainment	Angeline Malik	Mini Series	
2024	Jafaa	Dr. Zara Hassan	Hum TV	Danish Nawaz		
2025	Agar Tum Sath Ho	Ramsha	Hum TV	Adnan Sarwar		
2025	Jama Taqseem	Laila	Hum TV	Ali Hassan		
2026	Winter Love	Mushk Jahanzeb	Hum TV	Danish Nawaz		

=== Music videos ===
Year	Song	Singer	Ref(s)
2025	"Tu Chaand Hai"	Akhil Sachdeva	

== Awards and nominations ==
Year	Award	Category	Work	Result	Ref(s)
2013	1st Hum Awards	Best Soap Actress	Nikhar Gaye Gulab Sare	Nominated	
2016	FOI Online Awards	Best Debut - Actress	Sanam Teri Kasam	Nominated	
2017	Masala! Awards	Social Media Sensation	—N/a	Won	
2018	6th Hum Awards	Best Actress - Popular	Sammi	Nominated	
2018	6th Hum Awards	Best Actress - Jury	Sammi	Nominated	
2021	20th Lux Style Awards	Best TV Actress (Viewers' Choice)	Sabaat	Nominated	
2021	20th Lux Style Awards	Best TV Actress (Critics' Choice)	Sabaat	Nominated	
2022	8th Hum Awards	Best Actress - Popular	Qissa Meherbano Ka	Nominated	
2022	8th Hum Awards	Best Actress - Jury	Qissa Meherbano Ka	Nominated	
2023	National Icon Awards	Icon of the Year	For contribution to Film and Television	Won	
2024	1st Kya Drama Hai Icon Awards	Best Actress (Critics Choice)	Nauroz	Nominated	
2024	9th Hum Awards	Best Actress Popular	Neem	Won	
2024	9th Hum Awards	Best On-Screen Couple (with Ameer Gilani)	Neem	Nominated	
2025	2nd Kya Drama Hai Icon Awards	Best Actress (Critics’ Choice)	Jafaa	Nominated	
2025	10th Hum Awards	Best Actress - Popular	Jafaa	Nominated	
2025	10th Hum Awards	Best Actress - Jury	Jafaa	Nominated	
2025	10th Hum Awards	Best On-Screen Couple - Popular (with Mohib Mirza)	Jafaa	Nominated	
2025	10th Hum Awards	Best On-Screen Couple - Jury (with Mohib Mirza)	Jafaa	Nominated	
2025	10th Hum Awards	Most Impactful Character	Jafaa	Nominated	
2025	10th Hum Awards	Best Global Star Award	—N/a	Nominated	
2026	3rd Pakistan International Screen Awards	Best Actress Popular	Jafaa	Nominated	
2026	3rd Pakistan International Screen Awards	Best TV Actress (Critics' Choice)	Jafaa	Nominated	

== Other recognitions ==
Year	Award	Category	Work	Ref(s)
2020	HELLO! HOT 100	Trailblazer	Sabaat	
2025	The ‘Random Year That Was 2025’ Gloss Etc Awards	Cross Border Sensation Award	Sanam Teri Kasam (Re-release)	
2025	The ‘Random Year That Was 2025’ Gloss Etc Awards	Acting Powerhouse Award	Jama Taqseem	
