= Aliya Bukhari =

Pakistani novelist and screenwriter

- Occupations: Author, Novelist, Screenwriter
- Writing career
- Language: Urdu
- Notable works: Dil-e-Muztar and Khamoshi

Aliya Bukhari (Urdu: عالیہ بخاری) is a Pakistani novelist and screenwriter. She started her career through Khawateen Digest and has written many popular novels and plays. Many of her novels and stories have been adapted to television plays, including Dil-e-Muztar, which earned her widespread acclaim and recognition. She has been also praised for her series Mere Qatil Mere Dildar, Mausam and Maana Ka Gharana.

== Selected work ==
=== Television (as a Writer) ===
Year	Title	Network	Director	Notes	Ref(s)
2011	Mere Qatil Mere Dildar	Hum TV	Asim Ali		
2013	Dil-e-Muztar	Hum TV	Shehzad Kashmiri		
2017	Khamoshi	Hum TV	Ilyas Kashmiri		
2024	Jaan Se Pyara Juni	Hum TV	Meer Sikandar		
2026	Gulbahar	Hum TV	Mehreen Jabbar		

- Aahista Aahista - Hum TV
- Mausam - Hum TV
- Maana Ka Gharana - Hum TV
- Deewar-e-Shab - Hum TV
- Qaraar - Hum TV
- Yun Tu Hai Pyar Bohut - Hum TV
- Bebasi - Hum TV
- Aadat

== Awards and nominations ==
- 2012: Hum Award for Best Writer Drama Serial - Mere Qatil Mere Dildar (nom)
- 2013: Hum Award for Best Writer Drama Serial - Dil-e-Muztar (nom)
