= Ameer Gilani =

Pakistani actor (born 1991)

- Born: Syed Ameer Kamal Gilani; Islamabad, Pakistan
- Education: Harvard Law School (LLM)
- Occupations: Actor; singer
- Years active: 2019–present
- Spouse: Mawra Hocane (m. 2025)
- Relatives: Syed Iftikhar Hussain Gillani (grandfather); Musarrat Nazir (grand-aunt)

Ameer Gilani is a Pakistani actor and singer known for playing Hassan Fareed in Sabaat (2020).

== Early life and education ==
Gilani's paternal grandfather Syed Iftikhar Hussain Gillani is a lawyer who served as the country's law minister under Benazir Bhutto in 1989–1990. Musarrat Nazir, a famed singer and actress active from the 1950s to the 1990s, is Iftikhar's sister-in-law.

In 2022, Gilani completed his Master of Laws (LLM) at Harvard Law School.

== Career ==
=== Actor ===
Gilani portrayed the role of an upper class university student in Shahzad Kashmiri's Sabaat opposite Mawra Hocane. The series aired on Hum TV in 2020 and he was nominated at 20th Lux Style Awards for his performance in the category of Best Emerging Talent in TV. In 2021, he appeared in a Defence Day's special music video by Atif Aslam. In 2023, he paired again with Hocane in Shahzad Kashmiri's TV series Neem.

=== Singer ===
In 2020, Gilani released the song "Sabaat", titled after his drama, on his YouTube channel, with the music produced by Sarmad Ghafoor and the music video directed by Usman Mukhtar.

== Personal life ==
Gilani met actress Mawra Hocane on the sets of Sabaat in 2020. On 5 February 2025, they were married in a traditional Muslim wedding in Lahore.

== Filmography ==
=== Television series ===
Year	Title	Role	Network	Notes
2019	Log Kia Kahenge	Arsal	Hum TV	Debut
2020	Sabaat	Hasan Fareed	Hum TV	
2023	Neem	Ashhad Aleem	Hum TV	
2024	Very Filmy	Syed Rohan Khan (SRK)	Hum TV	Ramadan series
2025	Agar Tum Sath Ho	Farhan	Hum TV	
2026	Zanjeerain	Muddasir	Hum TV	

== Awards and nominations ==
Year	Awards	Category	Work	Result	Ref(s)
2021	20th Lux Style Awards	Best Emerging Talent in TV	Sabaat	Nominated	
2021	1st Pakistan International Screen Awards	Best TV Actor (Popular)	Sabaat	Nominated	
