= Chal Parha =

2013 Pakistani TV series

- Genre: Documentary; Learning show
- Written by: Saqib Khan
- Directed by: Cyrus Viccaji; Omer Waiz and Saqib Khan
- Presented by: Shehzad Roy; Umar Uppal
- Starring: Shehzad Roy
- Country of origin: Pakistan
- Original language: Urdu
- No. of episodes: 23

Production
- Producer: Ali Shaan Khemani
- Production location: All Over Pakistan
- Cinematography: Mohammad Kashif KT
- Editor: Fahad Bajwa
- Running time: 15-25 minutes

Original release
- Network: GEO News
- Release: 8 February 2013

Chal Parha (Urdu: چل پڑھا) was a 2013 Pakistani learning show airing on the GEO News, directed by Cyrus Viccaji and Omer Waiz, produced by Ali Shaan Khemani and cinematography by Mohammad Kashif "KT". The show is hosted by the singer turned social worker Shehzad Roy. It aired every Friday and Saturday at 7:30 PM on Geo News.

== History ==
On 7 February 2012 Shehzad Roy was invited onto Hamid Mir's talk show Capital Talk. Shehzad Roy gave details about his show which was based on a tour de Pakistan, and the team of Chal Parha visited some 80 cities all over Pakistan from Attabad Jheel and Gulmit to Gojal and Thar and film in more than 200 government schools to show the country the state of schools. Guests in the show were Nadeem Afzal Gondal Chan, Anusha Rehman Khan, Raza Hayat Hiraj and Shehzad Roy.

== Plot ==
In the first episode Shehzad was at Al Amyn Model School in Gulmit, Gojal. Second episode was about language instructions in the schools. Third and fourth episodes were about the punishment to students in the schools.

== Cast ==
- Shehzad Roy - host
- Iman Ali - cameo appearance (1st episode)
- Faisal Qureshi - cameo appearance (1st episode)

== Soundtrack ==
Chal Parha

Soundtrack album by Shehzad Roy
- Genre: Theme song
- Length: 3:44
- Language: Urdu
- Producer: Ali Shan Khemani

Chal Parha original title song is sung by Shehzad Roy, composed and music by Shani Haider and lyrics by Nadeem Asad. Song's video is directed by Saqib Khan.

Track list
No.	Title	Singer(s)	Length
1.	"Chal Parha"	Shehzad Roy	3:44
2.	"Beya Beya"	Shehzad Roy	2:47
