= Nauroz (TV series) =

2023 Pakistani television series

- Written by: Kashif Anwar
- Directed by: Shahzad Kashmiri
- Creative director: Muhammad Awais
- Starring: Mawra Hocane
- Opening theme: Amanat Ali
- Country of origin: Pakistan
- Original language: Urdu
- No. of episodes: 16

Production
- Executive producer: Fasih Ur Rehman
- Producers: Shahzad Kashmiri; Imran Raza
- Production companies: Nuqta Productions; Multiverse Entertainment

Original release
- Network: Green Entertainment
- Release: 13 July – 26 October 2023

Nauroz (Urdu: نوروز) is a 2023 Pakistani television series that premiered on Green Entertainment, directed by Shahzad Kashmiri, who co-produced it as well. The series features Mawra Hocane as the main protagonist. The plot focuses on a girl from a small village and her journey to a big city where she learns the philosophy of life.

== Plot ==
Armaghan Khan, a civil servant, marries Pariwash but faces marital issues. He finds solace in a Tawaif and proposes to her. The Tawaif dies during childbirth, leaving a baby girl named Rishtina. Armaghan's family rejects Rishtina, and his first wife leaves him. Armaghan secretly gives Rishtina to his friend Dervesh Khan, and dies the next day. Living in a remote town Jalalam, located between mountains, Rishtina grows up in isolation and turns twenty in a secret basement, believing the outside world is dangerous due to the deception by her adoptive parents, Darvesh and Ammara. Tragedy strikes when Ammara dies, and Rishtina learns the whole truth.

To protect Rishtina from her grandfather Karvaan Khan, who wants to kill her for being the daughter of a Tawaif, Darvesh Khan sends her to Islamabad to live with Ahsan, a friend of Armaghan. She arrives to find Ahsan paralyzed and with nowhere else to go. Ahsan's daughter-in-law, Sadaf, behaves harshly towards her and decides to stay in a hotel. When a hotel worker tries to assault her, she runs away and is compelled to spend her life on the road. After spending several nights on the road, she gets into a car accident. The car was driven by Hira, a famous TikToker, who brings her to her house. She decides to keep Rishtina in her house until her full recovery.

When Darvesh Khan leaves alone after Rishtina's departure, Karvaan Khan comes to meet him, where he learns that he had kept Armaghan's daughter here for years. He kills Darvesh Khan and goes to Islamabad in search of Rishtina to kill her. He seeks the help of his friend Waji Gul, an Islamabad-based head of land grabbers who hires one of his workers, Rustam, to look for the girl.

Hira is the only daughter of her parents. She leaves her house when her parents discover her presence on TikTok, which creates a serious conflict between them. When she learns of Rishtina's story, she decides to help her. She recovers her money from the hotel with the help of her friend Rustam, who later begins to like Rishtina. After developing a bond with her, Hira helps her in making videos so that she can reach her Agha Jaan. Rishtina receives fame when one of her videos gets viral, where she fights with a TikToker, Junaid, who tries to harass her at a party. The fame makes her an overnight star on social media, gaining her millions of followers and huge earnings when she is approached for fashion modeling and brand advertisements.

Rustam finds out from Wajid Gul that Karvaan has killed the Darvesh Khan and tells Hira. Hira conveys this to Rishtina and warns her by showing her a picture of Karvaan Khan, who wants to kill her. After learning about the death of her Agha Jaan, for whom she was making videos, her heart breaks, and she gets fed up with the fake world of social media and tries to discover the purpose of the fame that she has achieved. She gets inspired by the teachings of YouTuber Shayan, who once worked as a television director but left the field due to the type of content that was being made for television audiences. With the help of Hira, Rishtina collaborates with Shayan, who directs a short film based on a story by Rishtina.

Rishtina helps a widow whose land was grabbed by Wajid Gul through social media. His worker tries to harm her, but Rustam saves her by reaching there and beating his own fellow worker. When Wajid Gul finds out about it, he doubts Rustam and investigates him. He learns that Rishtina is the same girl that Karvaan Khan is looking for. He tries to inform him through the phone, but gets killed by Rustam. Born as Khadim Hussain, Rustam had lived in poverty before he started working for Wajid. He is arrested by the police for the murder of Wajid Gul.

When Rishtina leaves the cinema after the premiere of her short film, she is kidnapped by two masked men. Shayan follows them and saves her. When police catch the kidnappers, it is revealed that the kidnapper was Junaid, who was trying to get revenge on Rishtina. She had humiliated him at a party for harassing her, after which his career went downhill. For their safety, Hira decides to bring Rishtina to her parents' house with her, as they had recently reconciled. One day on the road, she comes across her mother, who was driving a taxi due to her father's ailment. She takes her to her father, and the parents accept her and forgive her.

On Wajid Gul's death, Karvaan Khan comes to his house and advises his son to forgive Rustam so that they could kill him by themselves. He agrees to it. Karvaan Khan learns that his grandson Salar is alive and currently living in Islamabad with his wife and son Sarib. He goes to meet him, but he blatantly tells him that he doesn't want to establish any connection with them, as told by his mother.

After the short film, Rishtina and Shayan decide to collaborate on a Children's television series for which they choose Sarib as one of the cast members. On the day of shooting, Sarib is kidnapped and the police try to recover him. Rishtina, who was in Salar's house at that time with his mother comforting her, is stunned to see Karvaan Khan, who comes there upon the news of the kidnapping of his grandson. After interrogating Salar's wife about him, she discovers that Salar is her brother. Rishtina gets the help of Rustam, who is in jail and has connections with a child-trafficking gang. The police recover many kidnapped children with the help of Rishtina and Shayan. Karvaan Khan becomes emotional on the recovery of his grandson and thanks Rishtina.

Rustam is released from jail and decides to leave his life as a criminal by going back to Chakwal to his siblings. He sends a letter to Rishtina where he tells her the truth that her Agha Jaan had not died of pneumonia but was murdered by Karvaan Khan. He then goes to kill Karvaan Khan but gets himself killed by him and Wajid Gul's son.

When Rishtina receives his letter, she instantly realises that Karvaan Khan has murdered him, alongside killing her Agha Jaan. She gets fed up with this hide-and-seek and determines to face him and punish him for his deeds. She files FIRs against him for the murders of Agha Jaan and Rustam in the police stations of Jalalam and Islamabad, respectively. She goes to Jalalm and challenges him for his deeds by looking into his eyes. He tries to kill her but fails, and the police reach and arrest him. She returns to Islamabad, where she shares her story in interviews and podcasts. Afterwards, she starts a cleanliness campaign with Hira and Shayan contributing to the betterment of society.

== Cast ==
- Mawra Hocane as Rishtina
- Mahnoor Shaukat as Hira
- Shamil Khan as Darvesh Khan/ Agha Jaan
- Rana Majid Khan as Rustam/ Khadim Hussain
- Manzar Sehbai as Karvaan Khan
- Alamdar Khan as Armaghan
- Areeba Ahmed Tirmizi as Sadaf
- Sultan Hussain as Wajid Gul
- Mohsin Ejaz as Shayan
- Saad Farrukh Khan as Wajid Gul's son
- Mustafa Rizvi as Affan
- Ahmad Taha Ghani as Salar

=== Guest cast ===
- Salman Shahid as vagrant dervish (Epsidoe 8-10)
- Hani Taha as social media personality in video (Episode 7)

== Production ==
Nauroz was confused by media reports with Neem, another Shahzad Kashmiri directorial, Kashif Anwar's written and Mawra Hocane starrer, as the development began on it during the same time. Due to the COVID-19 pandemic lockdown and lead actor Ameer Gilani's unavailability due to his academic engagements, Neem was put on hold and Kashmiri started the pre-production work of Nauroz along with writer Kashif Anwar, and Hocane was offered by Kashmiri to star in Nauroz. On choosing this script, Hocane stated that, Nauroz threw her right out of her comfort zone and Shahzad Kashmiri's guidance helped her to grow as an actor and as a person. To portray a young girl, Hocane lost about 6 kg weight and was almost starving leading her to clear her memory about the filming of the series.

The trailer of the series was launched by the network on 22 April 2023.

=== Broadcast ===
On 29 June 2023, it was revealed by the channel's social media handles that the show will premier on 13 July 2023, airing episodes weekly on Thursday at 20:00 PST.

== Soundtrack ==
The original soundtrack track of the series 'Sawal' is performed by Amanat Ali, with lyrics by Kashif Anwar and music composition by Naveed Nashad.

== Reception ==
=== Critical reception ===
The series was praised critically, with Mawra Hocane's portrayal of a young naive agnostic teen was met with acclaim from critics.
