= Alycia Dias =

Pakistani playback singer

- Born: Alycia Dias; Karachi, Pakistan
- Genres: Rock; Pop; Jazz, Ballad
- Occupation: Playback Singer
- Instrument: Vocals
- Years active: 2012–present

Alycia Dias is a Pakistani playback singer, who is best known for singing theme songs for Urdu-language serials. Her career began with her participation in the reality show LG Awaaz Banaye Star, where she became the semi-finalist at the age of 17. She made her debut as a lead vocalist by singing the title song of the 2012 Turkish serial Noor in Urdu language. She has won Hum Award for Best Original Soundtrack for her song "Dil-e-Muztar" for the 2013 romantic drama Dil-e-Muztar that aired on Hum TV.

== Career ==
Dias started her career with LG Awaaz Banaey Star, where she won the contest at the age of 17. She started her playback singing career with the songs "Tum Hi Ho" and "Aag", which she sang with the band The Milestones. She then sang the theme song of Urdu dubbed Turkish serial Noor, which aired on Geo TV. After this, she sang the theme song of Daagh aired on ARY Digital, which was also her debut OST for a television drama. She also sang the song "Yahan Zindagi Bhi Fareb Hai" for the serial Fareb on Express Entertainment. Her next song was for the Geo TV series Nanhi. Dias won the Best Original Soundtrack at the Hum Awards for singing the title song for the Hum TV's romantic serial Dil-e-Muztar, and later sang the title song of the serial Intikam, which was aired on Geo Kahani. Alycia next sang the song of Shukk with Nabeel Shaukat Ali which aired on ARY Digital. She also sang the soundtrack of the serial Pachtawa with Nabeel Shaukat Ali.

Alycia started her solo career with a single Sahara, which was released in 2016. Alycia was also one of the 48 musicians who rerecorded the National Anthem of Pakistan, re-visioned by Rohail Hyatt.

== Reality show ==
- 2007 LG Awaaz Banaey Star as Contestant—Semi Finalist (Eliminated)

== Discography ==
- 2012 "Tum Hi Ho" and "Aag"—Performed with The Milestones

=== All Soundtracks ===
Year	Song	Serial	Channel	Notes
2012	"Noor"	Noor	Geo TV	
2012	"Yeh Tamam Zindagi Daagh Hai"	Daagh	ARY Digital	
2013	"Yahan Zindagi Bhi Fareb Hai"	Fareb	Express Entertainment	
2013	"Choti Si Nanhi Si"	Nanhi	Geo TV	
2013	"Dil-e-Muztar"	Dil-e-Muztar	Hum TV	Hum Award for Best Original Soundtrack
2013	"Kankar"	Kankar	Hum TV	
2013	"Intikam"	Intikam	Geo Kahani	
2013	"Rishtay Kuch Adhooray Se"	Rishtay Kuch Adhooray Se	Hum TV	
2013	"Pachtawa"	Pachtawa	ARY Digital	
2014	"Agar Shukk Dil Mein Ajaye"	Shukk	ARY Digital	
2014	"Saari Bhool Hamari Thi"	Saari Bhool Hamari Thi	Geo TV	
2014	"Kiya Hua Jo Choota Tera Pyaar"	Iffet	Geo Kahani	
2014	"Jahan Ara "	Jahan Ara	ARY Zindagi	
2014	"Shehr-e-Ajnabi"	Shehr-e-Ajnabi	A-Plus Entertainment	
2014	"Hasti Hasati Subha"	The Morning Show	ARY News	
2014	"Kholo"	MasterChef Pakistan	Urdu 1	
2014	"Ishq Barra Beymaan Hai"	Ishq	Urdu 1	
2014	"Woh Bhi Bus Chup Rehti Thi"	Chup Raho	ARY Digital	
2015	"Hum Tere Nikah Main Hain"	Nikah	Hum TV	
2015	"Wafa Na Ashna"	Wafa Na Ashna	PTV Home	
2015	"Sohni Dharti"	Coke Studio (season 8)	Coke Studio Channels	
2015	"Armaan"	Coke Studio (season 8)	Coke Studio Channels	
2015	"Subh Ki Kahani"	Subh Ki Kahani	Geo TV	
2017	"Dil Nawaz"	Dil Nawaz	Aplus	
2018	"Mah-e-Tamaam"	Mah-e-Tamaam	Hum TV	
2020	"Doosri Dastak"	Mirage		
2021	"Adhuri Hoon Main"	Aakhir Kab Tak	Hum TV	
2022	"Tanhayi"	"Tanhayi"	Alycia Dias Official	2024

=== Singles ===
- Nadaniyaan
- Hawa Feat. Alex Shahbaz
- Bewafa
- Na Jaane
- Jhoomlay
- O Holy Night
- Sahara
- Hum Azad Hain
- Tanhayi Feat. Vahaj Hanif
- Nadaniyaan
- Tu Mera Nahi
- Khushfehmiyan Feat. Raafay Israr

=== OSTs ===
- Dil E Muztar
- Saaya 2
- Dil Nawaz
- Chalawa
- Mah-e-Tamaam
- Ye Kahani Kyun Adhoori Hai
- Main Lut Gayee Bulleya
- Ki Jaana Mein Kaun
- Iltija
- Umm-e-Haniya
- Kirchi Kirchi Joda Jeeva
- Woh Bhi Bus Chup Rehti Thi
- Ishq Barra Beymaan Hai
- Yeh Tamam Zindagi Daagh Hai
- Guddi

=== Intezaar - Extended Play (EP) ===
- Intezaar

== Coke Studio ==
Alycia Dias appeared in Coke Studio (Pakistani season 8) and performed Sohni Dharti with various artists, and Armaan with the Band Siege.

== Albums ==
Alycia Dias released her debut album, Intezaar in 2022. The album is produced and composed by Alex Shahbaz.
