= Very Filmy =

2024 Pakistani television series

- Written by: Syed Mohammad Ahmed
- Directed by: Ali Hassan
- Starring: Dananeer Mobeen; Ameer Gilani
- Opening theme: Ahmed Ali
- Composer: Ahmed Ali
- Country of origin: Pakistan
- Original language: Urdu
- No. of seasons: 1
- No. of episodes: 31

Production
- Producer: Momina Duraid
- Production locations: Karachi, Pakistan; Baku, Azerbaijan
- Camera setup: Multi-camera setup
- Running time: 36 minutes
- Production company: MD Productions

Original release
- Network: Hum TV
- Release: March 12 – April 12, 2024

Very Filmy is a 2024 Pakistani Ramadan special television series written by Syed Mohammad Ahmed, directed by Ali Hassan and produced by Momina Duraid of MD Productions. It stars an ensemble cast of Dananeer Mobeen, Ameer Gilani, Bushra Ansari, Ali Safina, Mira Sethi, Umar Khan and Nabeel Zuberi. It premiered on Hum TV on 12 March 2024.

== Premise ==
Despite their diverging paths, Daniya and Rohaan feel compelled to marry and are intertwined in the fabric of love by destiny. Rohaan, returning from overseas (Azerbaijan), is reluctant to wed a Pakistani girl he hasn't met. Nevertheless, due to parental pressure, he consents. Unexpectedly, they both discover love blossoming just around the corner.

== Cast ==
- Dananeer Mobeen as Daniya Ehsaan
- Ameer Gilani as Syed Rohan Khan (SRK)
- Bushra Ansari
- Mira Sethi as Sanam
- Ali Safina as Chugtai (Mama Ji)
- Umar Khan as Freddy
- Nabeel Zuberi as Danish
- Ameema Saleem as Maham
- Deepak Parwani as Ehsaan
- Salma Hassan as Saveera
- Tehseen Wajahat
- Noreen Gulwani as Mumtaz (Danish's sister)
- Adnan Jaffar as Rizwan
- Momina Munir
- Manal Siddiqui
- Rabiya Rizwan

== Soundtrack ==
The official soundtrack of the series 'Tere Rang Rang ' is performed and composed by Ahmed Ali, and lyrics by Syed Mohammad Ahmed.

== Broadcast and controversy ==
The fact that the drama mocked various Shah Rukh Khan movies did not sit well with netizens, who demanded an immediate ban on the drama. Some were disappointed that Pakistani dramas were now making fun of another nation's drama for attention, while others were miffed that the said dramas were promoting Indian movies.

== Reception ==
The series received a positive review in Dawn. Youlin Magazine was far more mixed and stated, "Nevertheless, the show suffers from a dearth of comedy and relatability. The allusions to famous Bollywood movies is also a bit over dramatic, and has been criticised by netizens. On the whole, it makes for a good light-hearted watch after Iftar, if you have nothing better to do."
