= Sarmad Sehbai =

Pakistani poet, playwright and director

- Born: 1945 (age 80–81); Lahore, Pakistan
- Other name: سرمد
- Education: Government College Lahore
- Occupations: Poet; Playwright
- Years active: 1968–present
- Relatives: Manzar Sehbai (brother)

Sarmad Sehbai (Urdu: سرمد صہبائی; born 1945) is a Pakistani poet, playwright, film and theatre director, who has worked in Urdu, Punjabi and English.

== Early life and education ==
He was born in Lahore, Punjab, British India, and pursued his studies at Government College Lahore, where he gained recognition for his Urdu poetry.

Actor Manzar Sehbai is his brother.

== Career ==
=== Television and movie scripts ===
Sarmad first made his career breakthrough in 1968 by getting a job with PTV as a scripts producer.

He adapted Manto's Naya Qanoon and Toba Tek Singh for Pakistan Television.

He wrote the play Mor Mahal in 2016 for television and the same year produced the script of the film Mah e Mir, Pakistan's nomination in the foreign language Academy Awards in the United States.

=== Poet and playwright ===
Sarmad Sehbai appeared on the Pakistani literary scene as a poet and made his theatre debut in the early 1970s. His poetry collection includes Neeli Kay Su Rung, Un Kahi Baton Ki Thakan, Mulaqat, Raja ka Beya. He wrote theater play The Dark Room, two Punjabi-language plays Panjawan Chiragh, Auss Gali Na Jaween and a documentary Mughals of the Road.

=== Novelist ===
In late 2024 Sarmad Sehbai released his first English-language novel, The Blessed Curse, a fiction which serves as a satire on the contemporary conditions of Pakistan, and it received critical acclaim from writers such as Mohammed Hanif and Mohsin Hamid.

== Awards and recognition ==
- Pride of Performance Award for Literature by the President of Pakistan in 2021.
