= Dil-e-Muztar =

- From left to right: Sanam Jung, Imran Abbas Naqvi, and Sarwat Gillani
- Also known as: Dil-e-Nadaan
- Genre: Drama; Romance
- Written by: Aliya Bukhari
- Directed by: Shahzad Kashmiri
- Starring: Imran Abbas; Sanam Jung; Sarwat Gilani; Aijaz Aslam
- Theme music composer: Waqar Ali
- Opening theme: "Dil e Muztar" by Alycia Dias and Imdad Hussain Imdad
- Country of origin: Pakistan
- Original language: Urdu
- No. of episodes: 22

Production
- Producer: Momina Duraid
- Production location: Karachi
- Running time: 39:47

Original release
- Network: Hum TV
- Release: 23 February – 27 July 2013

Dil-e-Muztar (Urdu: دلِ مضطر, The Anxious Heart) is a 2013 Pakistani romance drama television series about a love triangle involving a young man and two women. The show was well received by the audience and lauded for the lead cast performances after it started airing on Hum TV on 23 February 2013. Directed by Shahzad Kashmiri in his directorial debut, and written by Aliya Bukhari, the cast includes Imran Abbas Naqvi, Sanam Jung, and Sarwat Gilani in leading roles.

== Plot ==
Sila lives with her father Zaman and her stepmother Safeena and loves her cousin Adeel. Her parents dislike that she is close to her aunt Zahra, Adeel's mother. Sila rejects a proposal to marry Safeena's nephew Muneeb. Eventually, she runs away from home when her parents try to force her into marriage. Adeel brings her back home, and Zaman gets her married to Adeel the very next day. The two move out after this and start a new life. Adeel treats Sila cold-heartedly, but she wins him over in time. However, she suddenly falls ill after hearing about her father's demise. Adeel confesses his love to Sila, and eventually, she gives birth to their son Affan. Adeel loses his job and struggles to find another. Sila starts working for Ahmer's company to help Adeel. Zoya, their neighbour, assures Sila that she will take care of her home and son so that Sila doesn't have to worry. Instead, Zoya starts an affair with Adeel, and Affan is left alone with her mother, who doesn't bother to check on the crying and ill child. Sila heads for home when she sees Adeel and Zoya together. She rushes home, but Affan has died. Affan's death shatters Sila, who blames Adeel for her kid's death and leaves his house. Sila is back at her parents' house, living with Safeena, and is ready to accept and inherit her late father's wealth. Sila gives birth to a baby (of Adeel), and she names him Affan. Sila decides not to tell her only child about his real father. Five years later, Sila is now successfully in charge of her late father's business and expanding her business with the help of family friends, Nabeela, Sami, and Ahmer, as well as the support of Safeena.

Meanwhile, Adeel proposes to Zoya, who accepts, but they go through a rocky relationship with no children due to Zoya's fertility issues. Adeel's company is acquired by a new management team headed by Ahmer and Sila. Adeel meets Sila and asks for Affan's custody, but she refuses. Meanwhile, Ahmer, who hopes to marry Sila, prepares divorce papers for Sila and Adeel's separation, but Sila can't get herself to sign the papers. Zoya visits her and apologizes to her. Zoya confesses that it was she who created the rift between Sila and Adeel. Zoya falls on Sila’s feet and begs for forgiveness. She says she has wronged both Sila and Adeel, and she can’t turn back the time.

Ahmer, Sila, and Afaan drive to the park together. Sila finds Adeel standing there. They reconcile.

== Cast ==
=== Main cast ===
- Imran Abbas as Adeel aka Adi : Sila's husband; Zahra's son; Affan's father. (male protagonist)
- Sanam Jung as Sila Adeel (nee Zaman) : Zaman & Safeena's daughter; Adeel's wife; Affan's mother. (female protagonist)
- Sarwat Gilani as Zoya : Adeel's second wife. (main antagonist)

=== Supporting cast ===
- Saba Hameed as Safeena Zaman : Zaman's wife; Sila's step-mother.
- Shakeel as Ahmer's father
- Aijaz Aslam as Ahmer : Sila's friend.
- Ismat Zaidi as Zahra : Adeel's mother.
- Mohsin Gilani as Zaman : Safeena's husband; Sila's father.
- Rabia Noreen as Zoya's mother.
- Shamim Hilaly as Shaista : Safeena's sister; Sila's aunt; Muneeb's mother.
- Madiha Rizvi as Nabeela : Sila's friend.

== Production ==
Roomi Insha was first hired as the director for the series, who rejected Sanam Jung for playing the lead role in it. The project then went to director Shahzad Kashmiri who recast her in the series, which marked her acting debut. Sarwat Gilani was chosen to portray the antagonist, marking the first negative role of her career.

== Broadcast and release ==
- The show was aired in the Middle East on channel MBC Bollywood under the title امرأة أخرى.
- The show was also aired in India on Zindagi from 6 February 2015, under the title Dil-e-Nadaan.
- The show was also adapted by the HCTV network of Somaliland with the title Gabadhii Labaad.
- All episodes of the show are also available on MX Player app.
- It was also released on the iflix app as a part of channel's contract with the app but in 2019 all the episodes were pulled off and thus have no longer available.

== Awards ==
Year	Award	Category	Nominee(s)	Result	Ref(s).
2014	2nd Hum Awards	Best Director Drama Serial	Shahzad Kashmiri	Nominated	
2014	2nd Hum Awards	Best Drama Serial	Momina Duraid	Nominated	
2014	2nd Hum Awards	Best Negative Actress	Sarwat Gilani	Nominated	
2014	2nd Hum Awards	Best Writer Drama Serial	Aliya Bukhari	Nominated	
2014	2nd Hum Awards	Best Onscreen Couple	Imran Abbas Naqvi and Sanam Jung	Nominated	
2014	2nd Hum Awards	Best Drama Serial Viewers Choice	Momina Duraid	Nominated	
2014	2nd Hum Awards	Best Onscreen Couple Viewers Choice	Imran Abbas Naqvi and Sanam Jung	Nominated	
2014	2nd Hum Awards	Best Actor Viewers Choice	Imran Abbas Naqvi	Nominated	
2014	2nd Hum Awards	Best Actress Viewers Choice	Sanam Jung	Nominated	
2014	2nd Hum Awards	Best Actor	Imran Abbas Naqvi	Nominated	
2014	2nd Hum Awards	Best Actress	Sanam Jung	Nominated	
2014	2nd Hum Awards	Best Television Sensation (Female)	Sanam Jung	Won	
2014	2nd Hum Awards	Best Original Soundtrack	Alycia Dias	Won	

== Soundtrack ==
Dil e Muztar

Soundtrack album by Alycia Dias
- Genre: Theme song
- Length: 4:54
- Language: Urdu
- Producer: Momina Duraid

The theme song "Dil e Muztar" was composed by Waqar Ali and sung by Alycia Dias. It was written by Imdad Hussain Imdad. The lines of the song are frequently used during the course of the show.

Track listing
No.	Title	Singer(s)	Length
1.	"Dil e Muztar"	Alycia Dias	4:54
