= Meem Se Mohabbat =

2024 Pakistani television drama series

- Genre: Drama; Romance
- Written by: Farhat Ishtiaq
- Directed by: Ali Hassan
- Starring: Ahad Raza Mir; Dananeer Mobeen; Asif Raza Mir; Khadija Saleem; Zarrar Khan; (See Full Cast)
- Theme music composer: Shuja Haider
- Opening theme: "Beqarar Yeh Dil"
- Country of origin: Pakistan
- Original language: Urdu
- No. of seasons: 1
- No. of episodes: 33

Production
- Producer: Momina Duraid
- Production location: Karachi
- Running time: 32–37 minutes per episode
- Production company: Momina Duraid Productions

Original release
- Network: Hum TV
- Release: 5 December 2024 – 10 April 2025

Meem Se Mohabbat (Urdu: م سے محبت) is a 2024 Pakistani romantic drama television series produced by Momina Duraid Productions. It is directed by Ali Hassan and written by Farhat Ishtiaq. The series stars Ahad Raza Mir, Dananeer Mobeen, Asif Raza Mir, Khadija Saleem, and Zarrar Khan. It follows Ayat, known as Roshi, a carefree and bubbly young woman, and Talha, a serious and responsible man, and the slow development of their relationship.

== Plot ==
Ayat Suleman (Dananeer Mobeen), known as Roshi, comes from a family of engineers, and her relatives expect her to become one herself. Talha Ahmed (Ahad Raza Mir) runs his father's civil engineering company and is a serious, responsible man. Talha's brother and sister-in-law have died in a car accident, leaving behind a young son, Mohid (Abu Hurairah); Talha believes that, as the one driving their car during the accident, he is responsible and remains grief-stricken.

Roshi's sister, Mahi (Khadija Saleem), is disciplined and is their mother's favourite. Roshi has no interest in engineering and instead plans to marry, following the example of her favorite aunt Saleeqa, to avoid further studies. Her mother, Sadaf, believes that comfort and affection have spoiled her. Roshi deliberately fails all seven of her engineering college entrance tests and celebrates the failure, during which she witnesses Talha's fiancée, Sabeeka, break off their engagement because of Mohid. Roshi's new neighbour Rohail is interested in her, and his mother proposes marriage on his behalf, but Sadaf declines; Roshi later concludes that Rohail is not a suitable match for her.

Roshi's father, Suleman, who owns an engineering firm, arranges for her to intern at the office of his friend Abid (Asif Raza Mir). Talha, Abid's son, manages the office where Roshi interns; she takes the position reluctantly and only for the sake of the experience. On her first day, Roshi recognises Talha and, believing no woman would break an engagement without good reason, concludes that her new boss is dishonest; she nicknames him "Noyan" and considers him rude. Talha, in turn, sees Ayat as irresponsible, immature, and careless. She becomes friendly with Talha's father and, despite his usual intolerance of carelessness in the office, Talha tolerates her only for his father's sake.

Omar (Zarrar Khan), Saleeqa's son, is in love with Mahi. When his mother asks whether he likes a girl, he mentions Mahi, but Saleeqa misunderstands and instead proposes on behalf of her favourite, Roshi. Sadaf agrees, and Roshi is overjoyed, while Mahi conceals her disappointment upon seeing Roshi's happiness. Omar later realises the misunderstanding, informs Saleeqa, and explains the situation to Mahi, a conversation Roshi overhears. Roshi subsequently surprises both Mahi and Omar by arranging their engagement instead.

A new colleague, Shariq Arsalan, joins Ahmed Associates and befriends Roshi, who begins to like him without recognising his wrong. intentions. After overhearing colleagues discuss a malfunctioning office camera, Shariq attempts to take advantage of Roshi by asking her to stay late to finish a report, but his plan fails when Talha intervenes, drives her home, and warns her about Shariq's intentions.

The next day Talha drops her home and assures her that Shariq is not dead. Roshi joins Talha's office and slowly builds a very loving reletionship with Mohid and Talha's father. With that She slowly falls in love with Talha. But as soon as Talha understands her feelings, he makes sure that she stays away from him as he thinks that the age gap between them is inappropriate. Talha again gets involved with his ex girlfriend so that Roshi stops thinking about him. Talha confronts her and hurts her with his words. Roshi comes back home hearbroken and declares that she is leaving Talha's office. After some days, Roshi's family sets her marriage with a guy and that guy turns out to be Shariq. He blackmails her with a video of the previous day and forces her to marry him.

On the other hand Sabeeka (Talha's ex) tries to make a good reletionship with Mohid. But soon a mishap occurs, risking Mohid's life. Talha understands that Sabika can't take Roshi's place in Mohid's life. Roshi comes to meet Mohid in the hospital and taunts Talha. Soon Talha gets to know about Roshi marrying Sariq. He meets Roshi and continuously tries to make her understand that this marriage is inappropriate. Roshi warns him not to interfare in her matters. She makes plan to kill Shariq on the wedding night.

== Cast ==
- Dananeer Mobeen as Ayat "Roshi" Talha Ahmed (née Suleman) — Talha's wife, and Suleman and Sadaf's daughter. A bubbly, free-spirited nineteen-year-old who rebels against her academic, high-achieving family in favour of more carefree pursuits.
- Ahad Raza Mir as Talha Ahmed — Roshi's husband and Abid's son. A reserved, disciplined, and career-focused head of an architecture and engineering firm, who carries emotional trauma and cares for his nephew, Mohid.
- Asif Raza Mir as Abid Ahmed — Talha's father.
- Khadija Saleem as Mahi Suleman — Roshi's sister and Omar's wife.
- Zarrar Khan as Omar — Mahi's husband and Saleeqa and Jalal's son.
- Abu Hurairah as Mohid — Talha's nephew and Abid's grandson, a child affected by post-traumatic stress after the death of his parents.
- Faiza Gillani as Saleeqa — Omar's mother and Jalal's wife.
- Tehseen Wajahat Chishty as Jalal — Saleeqa's husband and Omar's father.
- Naveen Naqvi as Sadaf — Suleman's wife and Mahi and Roshi's mother.
- Tauseeq Haider as Suleman — Sadaf's husband and Roshi and Mahi's father.
- Beo Raana Zafar as Dadi Jaan — grandmother to Roshi, Mahi, and Omar.
- Arshad Mehmood as Dada Jaan — grandfather to Roshi, Mahi, and Omar.
- Rabiya Rizwan as Naheed
- Muhammad Hunbal as Rohail
- Zainab Mazhar as Sabeeka
- Naeema Garaj
- Laiba Shah
- Mekael Diwan
- Neha Khan

== Release ==
The first look was released on 21 November 2024. The series aired on Hum TV from 5 December 2024 to 10 April 2025. It initially aired weekly on Thursdays at 8 pm; from 1 January 2025, it aired twice weekly, on Wednesdays and Thursdays. Director Ali Hassan stated that there would be no second season, and that the story had concluded as intended.

== Reception ==
The series surpassed one billion views on YouTube. Critics praised its depiction of workplace harassment and the portrayal of family bonds, as well as its direction, while the age gap between the two leads drew criticism.
