= Mein Bushra =

Pakistani television series, 2014–2015

- Original title: میں بشریٰ
- Written by: Sanam Mehdi Rizvi
- Directed by: Bilal Qureshi, Ahmed Bhatti
- Starring: Mawra Hocane; Faysal Quraishi; Saba Hameed; Waseem Abbas; Saba Faisal
- Opening theme: Waqar Ali
- Country of origin: Pakistan
- Original language: Urdu
- No. of episodes: 23

Production
- Producer: Zeeshan Khan
- Production company: Zeekay Films

Original release
- Network: ARY Digital
- Release: 11 September 2014 – 15 February 2015

Mein Bushra is a Pakistani television series first broadcast on ARY Digital. It was written by Sanam Mehdi and directed by Bilal Qureshi and Ahmed Bhatti. It stars Mawra Hocane in the title role as one of the seven daughters of her father, who wants to prove to him that daughters are just as capable as sons. It also features Faysal Quraishi, Affan Waheed, Saba Hameed and Waseem Abbas in prominent roles. It aired from 11 September 2014 to 12 February 2015.

At 14th Lux Style Awards, it was nominated for Best TV Play and Best TV Writer.

In 2016, it aired in India on Zindagi.

== Plot ==
Bushra is the third daughter of her parents and she was named so by her father Nasir because he yearned for a son after her birth, but it couldn't happen and he had four daughters after Bushra's birth. That's why Nasir considers her as unlucky and does not accept her daughters wholeheartedly. Bushra is determined to do all the jobs that a son can do and her mother is hopeful too about her that one day she will become a supporter of her father.

After her elder sister Fiza's divorce and at the wedding preparations of another sister, to support her father she applies for a loan in her office but the request was rejected. Nasir taunts her for it but she doesn't lose hope until she receives a job call from a firm. She is selected on the base of her performance and is promoted shortly after.

== Cast ==
- Mawra Hocane as Bushra
- Faysal Quraishi as Faraz
- Affan Waheed as Shayan
- Saba Hameed as Sofia
- Waseem Abbas as Nasir
- Faryal Mehmood as Sania
- Saba Faisal as Sabiha
- Shehryar Zaidi as Musa
- Ismat Zaidi as Anusheh's mother
- Birjees Farooqui as Sania's mother
- Taqi Ahmed as Kashan
- Sarah Razi as Nazo

== Accolades ==
Year	Awards	Category	Recipient	Result	Ref.
September 30, 2015	Lux Style Awards	Best TV Play	Mein Bushra	Nominated	
September 30, 2015	Lux Style Awards	Best TV Writer	Sanam Mehdi	Nominated	
