= Qismat Apnay Haat Mein =

2008 studio album by Shehzad Roy

Studio album by Shehzad Roy
- Released: July 25, 2008
- Genre: Pop rock
- Label: The Orchard Enterprises, Fire

Shehzad Roy chronology
Buri Baat Hai (2005)	Qismat Apnay Haat Mein (2008)
External audio
- Jukebox playlist on YouTube

Qismat Apnay Haat Mein is the sixth album by Shehzad Roy's sixth album, released on July 25, 2008, on Fire Records.

== Track listing ==
1. Aankhien - Violoncello Version
2. Baro Chal- Tribute To Mayee Bhaagi (Lady Fortunate)
3. Darwaaza
4. Ek Bar
5. Jaane Kahaan
6. Khul Ke Pyaar
7. Laga Reh
8. Qismat Apnay Haat Mein
9. Quaid-e-Azam
10. Zindagi - Feat [Abida Parveen]
