= Let's Try Mohabbat =

2024 Pakistani television miniseries

- Genre: Romantic comedy
- Written by: Zeeshan Junaid
- Directed by: Angeline Malik
- Starring: Mawra Hocane; Danyal Zafar; Gohar Rasheed; Shahzad Nawaz; Tazeen Hussain
- Country of origin: Pakistan
- Original language: Urdu
- No. of episodes: 10

Production
- Producer: Babar Javed
- Production company: BJ Productions

Original release
- Network: Green Entertainment
- Release: 27 April – 29 June 2024

Let's Try Mohabbat is a 2024 Pakistani romantic television miniseries directed by Angeline Malik and written by Zeeshan Junaid. Produced by BJ Productions, it stars Mawra Hocane and Danyal Zafar in the lead roles. The series premiered on Green Entertainment on 27 April 2024.

== Plot ==
The story follows Zohan and Fizza, a couple who have been in a relationship for several years but face opposition from Zohan's father, Sikandar, who disapproves of love marriages. To overcome his objections, Fizza devises a plan in which their marriage is presented as an arranged match. Their relationship becomes complicated as they attempt to maintain the arrangement while dealing with family tensions and expectations.

== Cast ==
- Mawra Hocane as Fizza Chaudhary
- Danyal Zafar as Zohan Ali
- Gohar Rasheed as Azlan
- Shahzad Nawaz as Sikandar
- Tazeen Hussain as Samiya
- Zoya Nasir
- Nausheen Shah
- Alyy Khan
- Hina Rizvi
- Angeline Malik
- Muskan Junaid

== Reception ==
In its review published on 5 May 2024, Dawn discussed the series' portrayal of a young couple navigating opposition to love marriage. The review noted the themes of family dysfunction and the performances of Danyal Zafar, Gohar Rasheed and Tazeen Hussain.

In August 2024, The Express Tribune included Let's Try Mohabbat in a selection of Pakistani television dramas worth watching. In her article, Urooba Rasool described the series as a light-hearted romantic drama centred on Fizza and Zohan, noting its use of familiar romantic comedy conventions and family conflicts. She characterised it as feel-good entertainment rather than an innovative contribution to the genre.
