= Dananeer Mobeen =

Pakistani actress and influencer (born 2001)

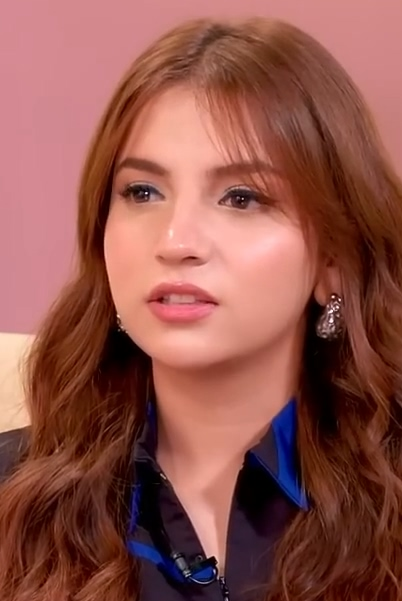
- Mobeen during an interview in 2025
- Born: December 2001 (age 24); Peshawar, Pakistan
- Other name: Pawri girl
- Occupations: Influencer; Actress
- Years active: 2021–present
- Known for: catchphrase

Instagram information
- Page: Dananeer
- Followers: 7 million (6 April 2026)

Dananeer Mobeen (Urdu: دنانیر مبین; born December 2001) is a Pakistani actress and influencer. She first gained popularity in 2021, after she became associated with a catchphrase stemming from one of her viral video on Instagram which developed into an internet meme. The same year she made her acting debut with a supporting role in the ISPR based Sinf-e-Aahan which earned her the Lux Style Award for New Emerging Talent. She has since starred in the romantic dramas Muhabbat Gumshuda Meri (2023) and Meem Se Mohabbat (2024).

== Early life ==
Dananeer (Note: Remarked on by some as unusual, the given name Dananeer originates as the Arabic broken plural form of the generic noun dīnār (pl. دنانير, danānīr)—a type of historical coin, such as the Islamic gold dinar. Mobeen ascribes to her given name the meaning "wealth".) Mobeen was born December 2001, to a Pashtun family in Peshawar, Pakistan. She has a brother and a sister. Her father is a Brigadier in the Pakistan Army. After completing her A-Levels, she got admission in The Millennium Universal College, from where she graduated in November 2024.

In her childhood, she had appeared in a PTV's reality adventure show, a video of which went viral in November 2025.

== Career ==
=== Early influencer ===
In early 2021 prior to gaining fame, Dananeer Mobeen was a 19-year old student running an Instagram account as an influencer with around 100,000 followers. She used to post her photoshoots alongside videos about fashion, make-up, and other topics.

=== Breakthrough: #PawriHoraiHai ===
External videos
- The original #pawrihoraihai by Dananeer Mobeen. Published 13 February 2021. (Note: This YouTube video is a repost of the original Instagram video)

On 6 February 2021, Mobeen uploaded a four-second video at Nathia Gali during an outing with friends. She filmed her car, her companions, and herself while stating in Urdu: "Yeh hamari car hai, yeh hum hain, aur yeh hamari pawri ho rahi hai", which translates as "This is our car, this is us, and this is our party (happening)", whereby "pawri" is an intentionally malformed pronunciation of the English word "party". The way she pronounced "party" mimicked and ridiculed a demographic known in Pakistan under the slang term "Burgers". (Note: People who emulate Western culture and whose speech patterns are influenced by English) She had recorded the clip a month earlier, and uploaded it to her Instagram account under the hashtag #PawriHoraiHai. (Note: Which translates as: "The party is happening")

In the days following its release, the video got over 2.7 million views, spawning the catchphrase-based "Pawri Ho Rahi Hai" meme. Indian music producer Yashraj Mukhate sampled the audio to create his own video, which also went viral and spread the meme to India. Celebrities, companies, and politicians from both the countries, Pakistan and India, adopted the phrase in marketing materials and public campaigns. The video earned Mobeen the nickname Pawri girl. The number of her followers increased to 1 million, and, according to her, she began receiving acting offers at this time.

Later in February, she was named a brand ambassador for Peshawar Zalmi in the Pakistan Super League, joining public figures like Mahira Khan and Esra Bilgiç. Later that year, she was also nominated at the 2nd Pakistan International Screen Awards for Most Entertaining Instagram Celebrity.

=== Television acting ===
Mobeen made her television debut in the Inter-Services Public Relations (ISPR)-coproduced TV series Sinf-e-Aahan (2021–2022), in which she portrayed the character of Syeda Sidra. In 2023, she played a lead role in the MD Productions' romantic drama TV series Muhabbat Gumshuda Meri as Zobia. The following year, she had a lead role in another MD Productions TV series, named Very Filmy. She subsequently played a lead role in Meem Se Mohabbat, also by MD Productions.

In 2022, she did voice acting for the ISPR-coproduced animated TV series Team Muhafiz.

== Filmography ==
=== Films ===
Key
†	Denotes films that have not yet been released

Year	Title	Role	Director	Notes	Ref.
2026	Mera Lyari	Afsana Baloch	Abu Aleeha	Debut film	

=== Television ===
Year	Title	Role	Network	Notes	Ref.
2021–2022	Sinf-e-Aahan	Syeda Sidra	ARY Digital		
2023	Muhabbat Gumshuda Meri	Dr. Zobia Saim (nee Sarmad)	Hum TV		
2024	Very Filmy	Daniya Ahsan	Hum TV		
2024–2025	Meem Se Mohabbat	Aayat "Roshi" Talha Ahmed (nee Suleman)	Hum TV		
2026	Hurmat	Hurmat Akram	Hum TV		

=== Voice Appearance ===
Year	Title	Role	Network	Notes	Ref.
2022	Team Muhafiz	Mahnoor	Geo Entertainment	Animated TV Show	

== Awards and nominations ==
Year	Award	Category	Work	Result	Ref
2021	2nd Pakistan International Screen Awards	Most Entertaining Instagram Celebrity	—N/a	Nominated	
2023	22nd Lux Style Awards	Best Emerging Talent – Television	Sinf-e-Aahan	Won	
2024	9th Hum Awards	Best Actress	Muhabbat Gumshuda Meri	Nominated	
2024	9th Hum Awards	Best Onscreen Couple (with Khushhal Khan)	Muhabbat Gumshuda Meri	Nominated	
