= Bol (film) =

2011 social drama film by Shoaib Mansoor

- Theatrical release poster
- Urdu: بول
- Directed by: Shoaib Mansoor
- Written by: Shoaib Mansoor
- Screenplay by: Shoaib Mansoor
- Produced by: Shoaib Mansoor
- Starring: Humaima Malik; Atif Aslam; Iman Ali; Mahira Khan; Shafqat Cheema; Manzar Sehbai
- Music by: Atif Aslam; Shoaib Mansoor; Sajjad Ali; Jafiey; Ahmed Jahanzeb; Hadiqa Kiyani; Ali Javed
- Production company: Shoman Productions
- Distributed by: Geo Films; Eros International Ltd.
- Release date: 24 June 2011 (Pakistan)
- Country: Pakistan
- Language: Urdu

Bol (Urdu: بول, lit. 'Speak') is a 2011 Pakistani Urdu-language social drama film written, directed, and produced by Shoaib Mansoor. The film stars Humaima Malik, Atif Aslam, Mahira Khan, Iman Ali, Shafqat Cheema, Amr Kashmiri, Manzar Sehbai, and Zaib Rehman in the lead roles. The film marks the debut of singer Atif Aslam and actress Mahira Khan. It concerns a family facing financial difficulties caused by too many children and changing times, with a major plot involving the father's desire to have a son and his rejection of his existing intersex child. Bol was a critical and commercial success and became one of the highest-grossing Pakistani films of all time.

This film was part of a maternal and child health project, PAIMAN (Pakistan Initiative for Mothers and Newborns), implemented by the Johns Hopkins University Center for Communication Programs (JHU.CCP), which entered into a partnership with Shoaib Mansoor's Shoman Productions in 2009. The project's objective was to advocate for women's rights by bringing the focus of the media and the elite of Pakistan to family planning and gender issues. The PAIMAN Project Communications Advisor and country representative of JHU.CCP, Fayyaz Ahmad Khan, served as the executive producer of the film. The film was reviewed by the Central Board of Film Censors in Lahore, on November 8, 2010, and received its approval the next day. Bol is set in Lahore and many students from the National College of Arts' (NCA) filmmaking department assisted Shoaib Mansoor on it.

== Plot ==
The movie begins with a woman in jail, Zainab, who is about to be hanged. A man is talking to her, and telling her to speak up about her story because it will change lives. At the president's office, his assistant brings him a form to sign for an appeal to forgive Zainab's death sentence. He then presents another form which asks for Zainab's strange request — to call media outlets and the press to the site of her hanging to “record her story” in the case that her appeal is denied. The president signs it. Her five sisters and mother come to see her before she is led to the hanging site. They cry together as they hug one last time before Zainab is led away. As she is led out, there is a clamouring group of press, taking pictures of her. She stands on the hanging site in front of the microphones. The commanding officer of the jail tells the press that the cut-off time will be at 4am, and Zainab begins to tell the press her story. She grew up with six sisters, a mother, and a father. The father always wanted a son so that the son could help with the financial issues of the family; the father does not believe in women being gainfully employed. They have an intersex child (khawajah sara in Urdu) named Syed Saifullah Khan, or Saifi. The father (Hakim) does not like Saifi since he is intersex. Saifi is deeply loved by the rest of his family. Zainab is married to a guy who keeps harassing her for not giving birth. Hence, she comes back to her father's house. Zainab's mother keeps miscarrying and Zainab arranges a tubal ligation for her. When Hakim finds out, he becomes very angry.

One day, Zainab sees Saifi dressed in women's clothes and gets very disturbed. Hakim owns a small traditional pharmacy and is approached by a man who asks him to teach the Quran to children since Hakim is a very religious man who has bonds with the mosque. Hakim initially refuses because the man, Saqa, is running a brothel. Meanwhile, the mosque gives him some money to keep since they believe him to be trustworthy. Mustafa, a neighbour, gets Saifi a job at a place where they paint trucks. There, Saifi is harassed because others discriminate against him.

One day, Saifi is raped. Another intersex person finds him and takes him home. Hakim overhears Saifi telling his mother and Zainab what happened. Later on, when everybody is asleep, Hakim suffocates Saifi to death with a plastic bag. He bribes a police officer to keep it a secret with two lakh (200,000 rupees or ~$2.5k USD) and is forced to take money out of the masjid funds. The masjid asks for the funds, and Hakim does not have enough money. He is forced to go to Saqa's house to get it.

Teaching children the Quran is not giving him enough money, so Saqa gives him another option: Hakim must marry and have a baby with Meena, who is one of the prostitutes and is Saqa's oldest daughter. Hakim keeps having girls, and Saqa tells him that it is the men who decide the sex of the baby. Meanwhile, Zainab gets Ayesha and Mustafa married since Hakim found another man at the masjid and wanted to get Ayesha married to that man. Simultaneously, Hakim marries Meena. When Hakim finds out about Ayesha's marriage, he is furious but cannot do anything about it. Meena has her baby, and it is a girl, meaning Saqa gets to keep it. Hakim begs Meena to give him the baby so that the child does not have to face a horrible future. Saqa overhears and kicks Hakim out.

Later on, Meena comes to give Hakim's family the baby. When Hakim's wife asks who that woman was, he takes the baby and tells her that he married her. She screams at him, and he beats her. The mother tells the kids what happened, and Zainab insists they all leave the house and move somewhere else to start a new life.

At night, Saqa comes to take Meena's daughter, since Meena was not supposed to give it to Hakim. Hakim tries to kill his daughter to keep her from a horrible future. He is killed by Zainab with a fatal knock on the head. They hide the baby. Zainab tells Saqa that Hakim killed the baby and threw her out somewhere; she tells him that she killed Hakim, which is why she is being given the death penalty.

Back in the present, a reporter keeps trying to prove that she is innocent but is unable to. Zainab ends by asking, ″Why is only killing a sin? Why is giving birth without any family planning, not a sin?″ before being hanged. The President sees the reporter's newscast that ends with that question and schedules a meeting with the same topic as the same as the question, i.e., jab khila nahi saktey tow paida kiyun karty ho. Finally, the rest of the daughters open a restaurant called Zainab's Cafe, which becomes very successful, and they raise their new half-sister Meena's daughter. The ending scene shows Meena, with a man, entering the cafe and recognising her daughter among the happy women of the Zainab family.

== Cast ==
- Humaima Malik as Zainab
- Atif Aslam as Dr. Mustafa
- Iman Ali as Sabina (Meena), a prostitute, Saqa's daughter and second wife of Hakim Sahib
- Mahira Khan as Ayesha Mustafa
- Shafqat Cheema as Ishaq "Saqa" Kanjar (Panderer)
- Manzar Sehbai as Hakim Sahib
- Riaz Mahmood as Zafar Shah
- Zaib Rehman as Suraiya
- Jafiey as a jasim
- Naima Khan as Master's wife
- Amr Kashmiri as Saifullah Khan/Saifi, intersex child of Hakim Sahib
- Meher Sagar as a young Saifi
- Humaira Ali as Marriage Bureau Lady
- Irfan Khoosat as Mustafa's father
- Rashid Khawaja as the President of Pakistan
- Mahnoor Khan as Mahnoor
- Gulfam Ramay as GuL G
- Almas Bobby as Tara

== Release ==
Bol was released on 24 June 2011 under the banner of Geo Films. Bol was also released in India on 31 August 2011, making it the third Pakistani film, after Ramchand Pakistani and Khuda Kay Liye, to be released in India. It was also released in the United States, Canada, United Kingdom, UAE and Australia on same date.

== Reception ==
=== Critical response ===
Bol received mostly positive reviews from critics. Rafay Mahmood of The Express Tribune criticised the film, calling it a major disappointment, and faulted it for its weak and one-dimensional characters, subpar production quality but praised the acting of Humaima Malik and Shafqat Cheema. Taran Adarsh of Bollywood Hungama gave 4/5 describing it as "A brilliant film embellished with bravura performances." Ayesha Nasir of Newsline Magazine wrote, "Mansoor’s film will spark a debate and, hopefully, rejuvenate a film industry that is struggling to keep its head above water. At a time when funeral prayers for Pakistan’s cinema are being held and most filmmakers are moving toward television, Bol is an inspiration. It’s a shining example of all that can be done when a good story meets brilliant dialogues and an unbelievable actor."

Shubhra Gupta of The Indian Express gave the film 2.5 out of 5, writing, "Even when it turns out to be too wordy, and much too long-winded, there's no denying that 'Bol' is important. Because it has the courage to say, via its spunky heroine."

=== Box office ===
It established a new box office record in Pakistani cinema. It became the highest-earning film in Pakistan in its first week of release, breaking all records. The previous record was held by Bollywood movie My Name Is Khan, which grossed PKR 13.417 million in its first week, whereas Bol did a business of PKR 62.792 million in six days. In two weeks, the total gross revenue of the film from 24 screens amounted to PKR 94,287,090, thus finishing its run with 120 million in its bank.

== Soundtrack ==
Bol

Soundtrack album by various artists
- Released: 2011
- Genre: Film soundtrack
- Length: 0:33:11
- Label: Fire Records (Pakistan)

Bol is the soundtrack album of the 2011 Urdu-language Pakistani film Bol by Shoaib Mansoor. Before the movie's release, Atif Aslam (who plays one of the main roles) in an interview stated, "I have done two songs for the soundtrack. It's been a great experience working with Shoaib Mansoor, he is an amazing person and very dedicated. My role isn't controversial and we discussed it beforehand. It's a film that is being made for a good cause."

All songs are mixed and mastered by Kashif Ejaz. The singers include Atif Aslam, Sajjad Ali, Hadiqa Kiani, Ahmed Jahanzeb, Shabnam Majeed, Sahir Ali Bagga, Bina Jawad, Faiza Mujahid and Shuja Haider. The soundtrack was successful and generally received positive reviews from critics. The song Hona Tha Pyar was written and composed by Ali Javed- a 16 years old school boy from Toba Tek Singh (a small town of Punjab). However, one critical review published in The Express Tribune called the movie's soundtrack "A surprising disappointment."

== Accolades ==
Ceremony	Category	Recipient	Result	Ref.
11th Lux Style Awards	Best Film	Bol	Won	
11th Lux Style Awards	Best Actress	Humaima Malik	Won	
11th Lux Style Awards	Best Actor	Manzar Sehbai	Won	
11th Lux Style Awards	Best Original Soundtrack	Atif Aslam ft. Hadiqa Kiani	Nominated	
11th Lux Style Awards	Song of the Year	Atif Aslam and Hadiqa Kiani – "Hona Tha Pyaar"	Nominated	
London Asian Film Festival	Best Film	Bol	Won	
London Asian Film Festival	Best New Talent	Amr Kashmiri	Won	
London Asian Film Festival	Best Actress	Humaima Malik	Won	
Pakistan Media Awards	Best Actress	Humaima Malik	Won	
Pakistan Media Awards	Best Film of the Year (2011)	Bol	Won	
Pakistan Media Awards	Best Actor	Atif Aslam	Nominated	
Pakistan Media Awards	Best Playback Singer	Atif Aslam	Nominated	
SAARC Film Awards	Best Actor	Manzar Sehbai	Won	
Asia Pacific Screen Awards	Best Performance by an Actress	Humaima Malick	Nominated	
Asia Pacific Screen Awards	Best Screenplay	Shoaib Mansoor	Nominated	
South Asian Rising Star Film Awards	Best Lead Actress	Humaima Malick	Won	
Fukuoka International Film Festival	Fukuoka Audience Award	Bol	Won	
4th Mirchi Music Awards	Upcoming Lyricist of The Year	Imran Raza – "Hona Tha Pyar"	Nominated	

== See also ==
- List of Pakistani films of 2011
- List of highest-grossing Pakistani films
