= Aahista Aahista (TV series) =

2014 Pakistani television series

- Genre: Romantic drama; Serial drama
- Written by: Aliya Bukhari
- Directed by: Haseeb Hassan
- Starring: Adnan Siddiqui; Mawra Hocane; Sarwat Gilani
- Opening theme: Aahista aahista aahista... by Rahat Fateh Ali Khan
- Country of origin: Pakistan
- Original language: Urdu
- No. of episodes: 18

Production
- Producer: Momina Duraid
- Production location: Pakistan
- Camera setup: Multi-camera setup
- Production company: MD Productions

Original release
- Network: Hum TV
- Release: June 1 – September 28, 2014

Aahista Aahista (Urdu: آہستہ آہستہ, lit. 'Slowly slowly') is a Pakistani television series produced by Momina Duraid under her banner MD Productions. It is written by Aliya Bukhari, directed by Haseeb Hassan, and starring Adnan Siddiqui, as a business tycoon caught in a love triangle between his two wives, played by Sarwat Gillani and Mawra Hocane.

== Plot ==
Zawaar is a Pakistani businessman living in California and happily married to Sophia, an Anglo-Indian girl. Zawaar’s family, i.e., his mother Bi Jaan in Pakistan, is unaware of his marriage with Sophia. Things take a new turn when Zawaar returns to Pakistan to see the ailing Bi Jaan. Unaware of Zawaar's relationship with Sophia, Bi Jaan and Zawwar’s sister insist he marry Bi Jaan's niece Haya. How will Zawwar manage this challenge? Will he leave Haya or divorce Sophia?

== Cast ==
- Adnan Siddiqui as Zawaar
- Mawra Hocane as Haya
- Sarwat Gilani as Sophia "Sophee"
- Saba Hameed as Bi Jaan
- Behroze Sabzwari
- Hina Khawaja Bayat
- Javed Sheikh
- Shehroz Sabzwari as Mustafa
- Annie Zaidi as Safia
- Mehr Jaffri

== Reception ==
Sadaf Haider of the DAWN Images criticized the portrayal of certain characters and plot elements, questioning the unrealistic transformation of characters and stereotypical depictions.

== Impact ==
Hocane's performance in the series caught the attention of some filmmakers, ultimately leading to her casting in the 2016 Bollywood film Sanam Teri Kasam.

== See also ==
- List of programs broadcast by Hum TV
