= Belmaya Nepali =

Female documentary maker from Nepal

- बेलमाया नेपाली
- Born: Pokhara, Nepal
- Occupations: Filmmaker, photographer
- Notable work: Educate Our Daughters; I Am Belmaya
- Children: 1
- Awards: UK Asian Film Festival (2019)

Belmaya Nepali (Nepali: बेलमाया नेपाली) is a filmmaker from Nepal. She has made several award-winning documentaries depicting the life of women in Nepal especially of those from Dalit community.

== Biography ==
Nepali was born in Lahachowk in Pokhara. She is the youngest of six siblings. She lost her parents at the age of nine. She got married in 2011. Initially she started as a photographer after getting a short training. Her first work was published in 2007 in a book called My World, My Views.

== Works ==
- I am Belmaya is a documentary based on her own life which is co-directed by Sue Carpenter
- Educate Our Daughters is a documentary raising the issues of female education in Nepal.
- Rowing Against the Flow is a documentary about boat women in Pokhara's Phewa lake.
- Stronger is a documentary dealing with the Nepali women.

== Awards ==
- Winner of Toronto Reel Asian International Film Festival (Nov 2018, Canadian Premiere) for Educate Our Daughters
- Winner of UK Asian Film Festival (Mar–Apr 2019, European Premiere) for Educate Our Daughters
