= Iman Ali =

Pakistani actress (born 1980)

- ایمان علی
- Born: Iman Ali; 19 December 1980 (age 45); Lahore, Punjab, Pakistan
- Occupation: Actress
- Years active: 1998–present
- Spouse: Babar Bhatti (m. 2019)
- Parents: Abid Ali (father); Humaira Ali (mother)
- Relatives: Rahma Ali (sister); Rabia Noreen (stepmother)

Iman Ali (Urdu: ایمان علی; born 19 December 1980) is a Pakistani actress and model who is best known for her work in Urdu films. Ali made her film debut with a leading role in the 2007 drama film Khuda Kay Liye, for which she won a Lux Style Award for Best Actress. In films, she has also starred as the main female lead in the 2016 biographical drama Mah e Mir, and had a supporting role in the 2011 social drama Bol.

== Early life ==
Iman Ali was born on 19 December 1980 in Lahore, Punjab in Pakistan to actors Abid Ali and Humaira Ali. Her father was from Gujranwala.

== Career ==
Ali first appeared in the serial Dil Dekay Jaien Gay followed by Arman, Kismat, Woh Tees Din, Pehla Pyar, and Kuch Log Roth Kar Bhi. In addition, she starred alongside Shehzad Roy in the first episode of the TV serial "Chal Parha", which aired on Geo News in 2013.

In 2003, Ali appeared in Ishq, Mohabbat Apna Pan, also known as Anarkali video, in a seven-minute music video directed by Shoaib Mansoor. She followed this with the leading role in Zoheb Hassan's television series Kismat. Later, she co-hosted the Lux Style Awards in 2005 and appeared in some more television productions, which ended in 2006 after her breakthrough into films.

In 2007, Ali made her film debut in Shoaib Mansoor's Khuda Kay Liye opposite Shaan, Fawad Khan, and Naseeruddin Shah for which she received the Lux Style Awards for 'Best Actress' in 2008. She appeared in a supporting role in Shoaib Mansoor's second film, Bol, opposite Humaima Malik, Atif Aslam, and Mahira Khan.

In 2015, Ali appeared in the lead role in Anjum Shehzad's Mah e Mir opposite Fahad Mustafa and Sanam Saeed. She next starred in the film Tich Button as Leena, which began production in 2019 and was released in November 2022.

== Personal life ==
Ali is the daughter of actor Abid Ali and actress Humaira Ali. On 21 February 2019, she married Babar Bhatti, a Canada-based businessman and the grandson of Major Raja Aziz Bhatti, in Lahore. Ali's younger sister Rahma Ali is a singer and actress.

== Filmography ==
=== Television series ===
Year	Title	Role	Network
2002	Pehla Pyar	Isha	PTV
2006	Kismat	Faryal	Geo Entertainment
2008	Saiban Sheeshay Ka	Husna	PTV
2010	Woh Tees Din	Shaista	PTV
2011	Bewafaiyan	Rida	ARY Digital
2012	Armaan	Sara	PTV
2012	Dil Deke Jayen Ge	Zobi	Geo TV
2013	Chal Parha	Herself	Geo News

=== Telefilm ===
Year	Title	Role
2012	Kuch Log Rooth Kar Bhi	Nazish

=== Film ===
Key
†	Denotes films that have not yet been released

Year	Film	Role	Notes
2007	Khuda Kay Liye	Maryam AKA "Mary"	Won Best Actress – Lux Style Awards
2011	Bol	Meena / Sabina	
2014	O21	Aleeha Siddiqui	
2015	Mah e Mir	Mahtab	
2022	Tich Button	Leena	

=== Music videos ===
Year	Band/Singer	Song	Ref.
2000	Abrar-Ul-Haq	Sanu Tera Nal Pyar Hogya	
2005	Shabnam Majeed	Ishq Mohabbat Apna Pan	
2016	Shehzad Roy and Zoe Viccaji	Jind Jaan	

== Awards and nominations ==
=== Lux Style Awards ===
Year	Award	Category	Work	Result	Ref.
2002	1st Lux Style Awards	Best Model of the Year	—N/a	Nominated	
2004	3rd Lux Style Awards	Best Model of the Year	—N/a	Nominated	
2005	4th Lux Style Awards	Best Model of the Year	—N/a	Nominated	
2006	5th Lux Style Awards	Best Model of the Year	—N/a	Nominated	
2008	7th Lux Style Awards	Best Film Actress	Khuda Kay Liye	Won	

=== International Pakistan Prestige Awards ===
Year	Award	Category	Work	Result	Ref.
2017	International Pakistan Prestige Awards	IPPA Style Icon of the Year	—N/a	Nominated	

== See also ==
- List of Pakistani models
- List of Pakistani actresses
- List of Lollywood actors
