= Nikhar Gaye Gulab Sare =

Pakistani television series

- Also known as: Gulon Mein Rang
- Genre: Drama; Romance
- Written by: Nadia Akhtar
- Directed by: Asim Ali
- Creative director: Kashif A. Khan
- Starring: Sabreen Hisbani; Faisal Rehman; Shamoon Abbasi; Rashid Mehmood; Sangeeta; Naima Khan; Imran Aslam; Hassan Niazi; Mawra Hocane; Afshan Qureshi
- Composer: (MAD Music)
- Country of origin: Pakistan
- Original language: Urdu
- No. of seasons: 1
- No. of episodes: 73

Production
- Executive producers: Arfan; Ali
- Producer: Momina Duraid
- Production location: Karachi
- Cinematography: Shehzad Kashmiri
- Editors: Sheraz Fayaz; Salman
- Running time: 38 minutes
- Production company: Moomal Productions

Original release
- Network: Hum TV
- Release: 15 May – 27 September 2012

Nikhar Gaye Gulab Sare (Urdu: نکھر گئے گلاب سارے) is a Pakistani television series directed by Asim Ali and written by Nadia Akhtar, based on the novel of the same name by Shazia Chaudry. Momina Duraid produced the show.

The show was also broadcast in India on Zindagi from 27 May 2015 to 31 August 2015 under the title Gulon Mein Rang (lit. "Colouring in the Flowers"). It was also aired in Mauritius by MBC Network

== Plot ==
Nikhar Gaye Hain Gulab Saare is the story of Shehryal (Mawra Hocane), who is committed to her cousin, Malik Duraab (Shamoon Abbasi). Shehryal doesn't like the spoiled brat Duraab, who turns out to be a very abusive and extremist landlord. This drama also narrates the story of a girl, Zarlala, whose brother-in-law has lustful eyes upon her.

== Cast ==
- Sabreen Hisbani as Saima
- Mawra Hocane as Shehryal
- Imran Aslam as Sikandar
- Faisal Rehman as Shehryal's eldest brother
- Naima Khan as Shehryal's mother
- Zaheen Tahira as Badi Apa
- Shamoon Abbasi as Malik Durab
- Sangeeta as Badi Malkani
- Hassan Niazi as Shehryal's second brother
- Afshan Qureshi as Sikandar's mother
- Shazia Afgan
- Rashid Mehmood
- Hashim Butt
- Sana Ismail
- Nasreen Kanwal

== See also ==
- Mar Jain Bhi To Kya
