= Neem (TV series) =

Pakistani television series

- Title Card
- Urdu: نیم
- Genre: Drama; Crime; Thriller
- Written by: Kashif Anwar
- Directed by: Shahzad Kashmiri
- Starring: Mawra Hocane; Syed Jibran; Arslan Naseer; Ameer Gilani
- Opening theme: "Chup" (NEEM) by Adnan Qureshi & Alamdar Khan
- Country of origin: Pakistan
- Original language: Urdu
- No. of episodes: 23

Production
- Producer: Momina Duraid
- Production locations: Lahore; New York City; Kashmir
- Camera setup: Multi-camera
- Running time: approx. 35-40 min
- Production company: MD Productions

Original release
- Network: Hum TV
- Release: 5 June – 6 November 2023

Neem (Urdu: نیم, lit. 'neem') is a Pakistani television series directed by Shahzad Kashmiri and produced by Momina Duraid under the banner of MD Productions. It stars Mawra Hocane, Syed Jibran, Arslan Naseer and Ameer Gilani. The series is set in Lahore, New York City and Kashmir. It premiered on Hum TV on 5 June 2023. The plot revolves around a dedicated university graduate Zimal, who decides to work for children's education and deal with her personal problems, a ruthless entitled son of a tribal leader Karamat Khan, and an unemployed middle class guy, Ashhad, who has one-sided feelings for Zimal. It concluded on 6 November 2023 after 23 episodes.

== Plot ==
During studying at a Lahore university, Zimal Riyasat develops the passion to help others in the form of education, after being influenced by the teachings of her teacher, Professor Mairaj. After her graduation, she returns to her homeland Kashmir, where she decides to work for the education of children after meeting Baba Jan, an influential person and a father figure for Zimal. Her cousin Shazil to whom she is committed, calls her and asks her about their marriage, which she delays for two years because she wants to do something better for others.

Baba Jan's son, Karamat Khan wants to marry Zimal because her first wife couldn't give him a son. His overly generous nature enhances the rift between him and Karamat when he decides to return all the lands of the peasants. He almost completes his plan but gets killed by his son, Karamat, who pushes him from a cliff. After his death, he grabs all the property and lands of the workers by unfair means and sends a marriage proposal to Zimal, which she refuses, reacting furiously.

On revealing the true colour of Karamat whom she considered as her elder brother, she decides to marry Shazil instantly. She marries her and goes to Islamabad in his house and gets a job as a school teacher. There, she opens a street school with the help of a fellow teacher, Maryam and also with the help of Shazil.

Ashaad's ancestors were brought to Kashmir decades ago to serve as lower social class workers. Since his childhood, he has been in one-sided love with Zimal and wants to marry her but, there is an obstruction of the classism. After her marriage, the heartbroken Ashaad leaves for the USA and starts doing a job there with the help of Faisal, a well-settled Lahori in the USA.

Zimal's relationship with Shazil faces the test of time when it reveals that she could never become a mother, despite the IVF. The distances fathers when she starts working on her plan to spread education through a mobile app. While traveling to Karachi for a meeting about the execution of her plan, she adopts an orphaned by. When she reveals it to Shazil, it infuriates him and he forbids her. After observing Shazil's changed behavior towards her and getting rid of her regret of not giving children to him, she marries him to Mariyam, her friend and colleague in her school. After marriage, the couple gets busy in their newly established relationship, due to which Zimal feels jealous. To overcome her negativity, she decides to distance herself from them and leaves for Kashmir.

Ashaad's mother is diagnosed with a brain tumor, for which he decides to bring her to USA for better treatment. For this purpose, he marries a local woman, Camilla, to get a green card. However, the mother dies sooner, and he leaves with the greedy Camilla there, who starts scheming with her boyfriend to grab his money. She files a false case of domestic violence against him and in return demands his property, which was granted to him by his boss.

Karamat succeeds in snatching the lands from all the poor except Ashaad's elder brother Asad, who had already paid the price of his land to Baba Jan. For this reason Karamat, decides to destroy him. His animosity with his family adversely increases when he learns about the affair of his daughter Afsheen with Asad and Ashaad's younger brother Amjad. He forcefully marries her daughter readily among his relatives. By using his resources, he arrests Asad on a false charge of counterfeit money. He kidnaps Amjad, tortures him and pushes him off the cliff. However, he escapes the death but is arrested by the police in the false case. Karamat's right hand Jamil informs him that Karamat is taking revenge from his family. Jamil also saves some evidence of Karamat's evil antics but is killed by him when he becomes suspicious of him and confirms it when the former is intoxicated. He kills his brother and wife as well.

Nobody informs Ashaad about the hardships that his family is facing in his hometown. When he eventually learns about it from his friend, he leaves for Pakistan. He saddens on reaching his hometown where Karamat is throwing people out of their houses. Zimal helps them by set up a tent city and persuades their case legally.

Karamat sends his men to keep on teasing people, but Zimal never loses hope, while Ashaad supports her financially and morally. One good day, Shazil reaches out to the tents in order to meet Zimal, telling her that he missed her and is not happy in her absence. He also conveys his guilt over his selfish behavior toward her. Zimal plainly let him go by telling him to remove his name from her CNIC. He understands the demand, divorces her with a heavy heart, and leaves. Soon, the news broke among the villagers that Zimal had been divorced. The next day, Shazil's brother's wife calls Zimal to tell her about the pregnancy of Shazil and Maryam and Zimal was delighted. Now, her complete focus is on villagers. Ashaad, who fights a court case for his brothers, is totally blank. One evening, when he was standing alone on an elevation, Zimal arrives and asks him the reason for his being so serious. He tells her that he used to love a girl very dearly but never got a chance to tell her, and then she got married. Zimal gets puzzled. Then he asks Zimal about the reason for her broken marriage. She tells him about her problem—that she can't have babies—and Ashhad gets surprised.

== Cast ==
- Mawra Hocane as Zimal Riyasat
- Ameer Gilani as Ashhad Aleem
- Syed Jibran as Karamat Khan
- Arslan Naseer as Shazil
- Mahnoor Niazi as Afsheen (Karamats Daughter)
- Muhammad Anees as Amjad ( Ashhad's youngest brother )
- Rahil Siddiqui as Nasir
- Hassan Shah as Jamil
- Yousuf Bashir Qureshi as Shah Alam "Baba Jan"
- Rana Majid as Faisal
- Shamil Khan as Asad
- Maryam Nafees as Mariam
- Ismat Zaidi as Ashhad's mother
- Manzar Sehbai as Professor Mairaj
- Adeel Khan as Shahrukh, Shazil's brother
- Hani Taha as Gulnaz, Shahrukh's wife
- Areeba Tirmizi as Asad's wife
- Alamdar Khan as Zimal's brother
- Tahira Shahid as Zimal's sister-in-law

== Production ==
Developed by Momina Duraid, the pre-production work on the series began in early 2020, during the filming of Sabaat. It then went into halt due to the lead actor's admission in Harvard University. In January 2022, Hocane revealed in an interview with an online portal that she is part of the series along with Ameer Gilani which is written by Kashif Anwar, and will be directed by Shahzad Kashmiri. She also revealed that the series revolves around the importance of education. It marked her second on-screen appearance with Gilani after Sabaat (2020) which was also directed by Kashmiri and written by Anwar. The series was confused by media reports with Nauroz, Hocane's another upcoming series also directed by Kashmiri. In a conservation with DAWN Images, Gilani revealed that the genre of the series is life, and it is a primarily a love story, correlated and detached to other stories.

The teasers of the series were released in May 2023.

== Reception ==
=== Critical reception ===
The series was praised due to its visuals and various themes of its script but was criticized for the same for being preachy.

Youlin Magazine praised the visuals and locations of the series, the acting performances of Jibran and Gilani and the writing regarding the themes like consequences of desires, societal issues and romance.
