= UK Asian Film Festival =

The UK Asian Film Festival, previously known as the London Asian Film Festival, is a British film festival organised by the not-for-profit organisation Tongues on Fire Ltd. and takes place annually in the spring in London. The festival is the longest running South Asian film festival outside of India, having completed its 25th edition in 2023.

The festival's patrons are Abhishek Bachchan, Prof. Rachel Dwyer, Lord Diljit Rana, Sunita Sangar, Sabiha Sumar and Meera Syal.

== Festival films ==
The 21st Edition of UKAFF was held on 27 March – 4 May 2019, with the festival in London, Edinburgh, Glasgow, Leicester and Manchester. The Short Film Competition Winner was Belmaya Nepali for Educate our daughters, the Youth Curated Choice Award was for film Chegu, Best Documentary to Roopa Barua for Daughters of the Polo God, Best Director to Madhumita for KD, Best Actor to Rasika Duggal for Hamid, Best Film to Hamid and Audience Choice Best Film to Pinky Memsaab.

The 16th Edition of LAFF was held on 1–14 June 2014. The Festival was opened by Nagesh Kukunoor's film on child trafficking Lakshmi. The UK Pakistani collaboration Tamanna had its UK premier at the festival on 8 June 2014.

At the 14th LAFF in 2012 Pakistani films won three awards for the first time in the festival's history. Bol won three awards: Humaima Malik won Best Film Actress, Shoaib Mansoor won the award for Best Film and Amr Kashmiri won the award for Best New Talent, and Rahat Fateh Ali Khan won Best Music Talent Award for the song Koi Dil Mein from the film Tamanna.

Other films to have premiered at LAFF include Fire, Godmother, Khamosh Pani, Barfi, Bhopal: A Prayer For Rain, Waiting, Manto, Rang Rasiya, Margarita with a Straw, Seedlings (Lamha) and Good Morning Karachi.
