= Shahzad Kashmiri =

Pakistani television and film director

- Occupations: Director; Cinematographer; Producer
- Years active: 2000–present

Shahzad Kashmiri (Urdu: شہزاد كشميري) is a Pakistani television and film director, cinematographer and producer.

Kashmiri is best known for his work as a cinematographer in Hum TV drama serials such as Humsafar, Bilqees Kaur, Maat, Mata-e-Jaan Hai Tu, Zard Mausam, "Zindagi Gulzar Hai, "and as a director in Yaqeen Ka Safar, Sabaat and Parizaad. Kashmiri was awarded Hum Honorary Phenomenal Serial Award for Humsafar.

== Career ==
Kashmiri debuted as a television director in 2012 and has directed critically acclaimed drama series including Dil-e-Muztar (2013), Alvida (2015) and Maana Ka Gharana (2015–2016). He was nominated for Best Director Drama Serial at 2nd Hum Awards for Dil-e-Muztar.

In 2015, Kashmiri co-directed Bin Roye as his feature film debut. The film became the third highest-grossing film of Pakistan, earning him a nomination as Best Film Director at 15th Lux Style Awards.

== Filmography ==
=== Television serials ===
Year	Title	Director	Cinematographer	Producer	Network
2008–09	The Ghost		Yes		Hum TV
2010	Vasl		Yes		Hum TV
2011	Maat		Yes		Hum TV
2011	Humsafar		Yes		Hum TV
2012	Mata-e-Jaan Hai Tu		Yes		Hum TV
2012	Bilqees Kaur		Yes		Hum TV
2012	Zard Mausam		Yes		Hum TV
2012	Nikhar Gaye Gulab Sare		Yes		Hum TV
2012	Meray Dard Ko Jo Zuban Miley		Yes		Hum TV
2012	Mar Jain Bhi To Kya		Yes		Hum TV
2012	Zindagi Gulzar Hai		Yes		Hum TV
2013	Dil-e-Muztar	Yes			Hum TV
2014	Mere Humdum Mere Dost	Yes			Urdu 1
2015	Alvida	Yes			Hum TV
2015	Maana Ka Gharana	Yes			Hum TV
2016	Saya-e-Dewar Bhi Nahi	Yes			Hum TV
2016	Bin Roye	Yes			Hum TV
2017	Yaqeen Ka Safar	Yes			Hum TV
2019	Anaa	Yes			Hum TV
2020	Sabaat	Yes			Hum TV
2020	Be Adab	Yes			Hum TV
2021	Parizaad	Yes			Hum TV
2023	Neem	Yes			Hum TV
2023	Nauroz	Yes		Yes	Green Entertainment
2026	Zanjeerain	Yes			Hum TV
2026	Ishq Mein Khuda Mil Gaya	Yes			Green Entertainment

=== Films ===
Year	Title	Director
2015	Bin Roye	Yes

== Awards and nominations ==
=== Hum Awards ===
Year	Ceremony	Category	Project	Result
2013	2nd Hum Awards	Best Director Drama Serial	Dil-e-Muztar	Nominated
2022	8th Hum Awards	Critics' Choice Awards - Best Director	Parizaad	Won

=== Lux Style Awards ===
Year	Ceremony	Category	Project	Result
2016	15th Lux Style Awards	Best Film Director	Bin Roye	Nominated
2022	21st Lux Style Awards	Best TV Director	Parizaad	Nominated
