= Sabaat =

Pakistani television series by Momina Duraid

- Official title card
- ثبات
- Genre: Drama
- Written by: Kashif Anwar
- Directed by: Shahzad Kashmiri
- Starring: Sarah Khan; Ameer Gilani; Mawra Hocane; Usman Mukhtar
- Country of origin: Pakistan
- Original language: Urdu
- No. of seasons: 1
- No. of episodes: 28

Production
- Executive producer: Momina Duraid
- Production location: Rawalpindi
- Cinematography: Ehsun Kashmiri
- Editor: Liaqat A. Baltee
- Running time: approx. 37–40 minutes
- Production company: MD Productions

Original release
- Network: Hum TV
- Release: 29 March – 25 October 2020

Sabaat (Urdu: ثبات, lit. 'Stability') is a 2020 Pakistani television series produced by Momina Duraid under MD Productions. It stars Mawra Hocane, Ameer Gilani, Sarah Khan and Usman Mukhtar in lead roles. Sabaat revolves around two ambitious individuals who belong to different classes, fall for each other and face hurdles. It premiered on 29 March 2020 on Hum TV. Sabaat aired weekly on Sundays. The series received high viewership ratings and was critically acclaimed. At the 20th Lux Style Awards, the series received five nominations.

== Plot ==
Miraal is an arrogant young woman belonging to the elite class who is controlling and egoistic in nature, in short, a narcissist. Her father, Seth Fareed is a wealthy businessman who supports her even in her negative thinking while her mother and grandmother try to make her understand the values of life and that everything in this world is mortal. She always misbehaves with her grandmother when she advises her that her beauty and intelligence would fade one day. Her younger brother, Hassan Fareed is somehow influenced by her and is studying engineering. Anaya Aziz is an ambitious, strong-headed, women's-rights activist studying at the same university as Hassan. She and Hassan clash when she defeats him in an engineering model competition. Hassan insults her in response. She taunts Hassan about him being dependent on his father for everything while he himself hasn't achieved anything by himself. Hassan is deeply influenced by her words and starts to make money through online jobs and starts to take public transportation.

He starts liking Anaya because of her differentiated and independent thinking. Miraal, seeing a change in Hasan and not being able to control him anymore, finds out about Anaya and her brother's newly found love for her. She reaches the university and openly insults Anaya to which Anaya calmly responds. Miraal slaps her in anger. Hassan finds out and confronts Miraal. Their grandmother dies and Miraal begins to feel disturbed. Hassan gets shot while helping Anaya confront a guy who was blackmailing her friend. He recovers and then proposes Anaya which she accepts. He sends his parents to her house where his father (who supports Miraal that Hasan should not marry Anaya due to her middle-class background) humiliates her parents while his mother apologizes to them for misbehavior. Anaya for her parents' respect then rejects Hassan's proposal but finally gives in after his persuasion. They get married but Miraal does not attend the ceremony. She also burns Anaya and Hassan's room on their wedding night and tries to take revenge by marrying on the same day but her fiancé Ali flees on the wedding day. Their Walima is also cancelled due to Miraal and Fareed's threats. Anaya also joins company whereas Fareed makes Miraal the CEO of the company. Miraal degrades Anaya. She remains calm and collected despite Miraal's behavior while Hassan attempts to make his father understand about Miraal's wrong-doings. Miraal's senses become overshadowed by her grandmother's words and she began to visit psychiatrist Dr. Haris who falls in love with her. When Miraal slaps Anaya in front of employees, Anaya feels humiliated and leaves the office and goes to her parents' house. Hasan, upon learning of this, decides to leave the house while his father still supports Miraal.

They get a home on rent and Anaya and Hassan starts finding jobs for making money. Anaya gets a job. But unfortunately, the Supreme Court said that no construction takes place in the country for six months. This news disappoints Anaya and Hassan about jobs. Haris proposes to Miraal and they marry. Hassan gets a job through his friend ,Atif, in Yasir Qureshi's office where he is mistreated and humiliated on a daily basis whereas Anaya gets promoted in her office. Atif starts to create doubts in his mind about Anaya upon Miraal's request. Hassan starts to believe that Anaya has an affair with her boss, and confronts her the sameday Anaya goes to the doctor to realise that she is expecting a child. She realizes Hassan’s doubtful nature and neither replies to his accusations not does she even tell him about her pregnancy. Hassan returns to his parents' house. After some time, Anaya's father dies which breaks her completely. The money her dad has saved also gets wasted by frauds. Anaya gets a leave from her office and bakes cakes for a living. She has a baby boy and names him Ibrahim Aziz, after her father. On the other hand, Miraal finds out his husband is still continuing his job, which infuriates her and she leaves her home and threatens her husband that she will get a divorce. Ali returns and realizes he can't live without Miraal so he apologises and starts to create space in Miraal’s heart for him. Miraal decides to take divorce from Haris while Haris does not want to divorce her. Then Anaya resumes work and on the first day of her office, she learns that her new boss is Yasir Qureshi. When Atif tells Hassan that Anaya is working under Yasir Qureshi, Hassan decides to divorce Anaya. Yasir Qureshi orders Anaya to go on a trip to Islamabad and when she goes there, Yasir comes to her room in the night and gives her promotion letter but in the morning she resigns from the job and throws the promotion letter on Yasir's face. On the same day Miraal goes through an accident and due to the accident her spinal cord gets injured and is paralyzed but Haris takes care of her. She realizes her mistakes and confesses everything to Hassan, what she had done to Anaya in the past. Hassan feels ashamed and goes to Anaya's home to seek forgiveness but Anaya doesn't forgive him. Then Miraal goes to Anaya's home to seek forgiveness and asks her to forgive Hassan too. Anaya forgives Hassan. Anaya's mother adopts a boy named Muhammad Ali as she was alone. Haris takes care of Miraal but she is still guilty of what she has done to Haris in the past yet he forgives her. Anaya and Hassan, and Miraal and Haris live happily ever after.

== Cast ==
- Sarah Khan as Miraal Haris (née Fareed) : Fareed & Hashna's daughter, Hasan's sister, Dr.Haris's wife.
- Mawra Hocane as Anaya Hasan (née Aziz) : Aziz & Bushra's daughter, Hasan's wife, Ibrahim's mother.
- Ameer Gilani as Hasan Fareed : Fareed & Hashna's son, Miraal's brother, Anaya's Husband, Ibrahim's father.
- Usman Mukhtar as Dr. Haris Ahmed : Miraal's Husband.
- Javeria Kamran as Nirmal : Miraal's childhood Bestfriend
- Meiraj Haq as Dr. Murad : Dr.Haris's Best friend
- Jahanzeb Khan as Ali : Miraal's ex-fiance
- Moazzam Ali Khan as Fareed Kamal, Hasan and Miraal's Father
- Laila Zuberi as Hashna Fareed : Fareed's wife, Hasan and Miraal's Mother.
- Seemi Raheel as Bushra Aziz : Aziz's wife, Anaya's Mother
- Syed Mohammad Ahmed as Aziz Ahmad : Bushra's husband, Anaya's Father.
- Abbas Ashraf Awan as M Atif : Hasan's Best friend
- Azra Mansoor as Mariyam Bee : Hashna's mother, Hasan and Miraal's grandmother (Dead).
- Kashif Anwar as Yasir Qureshi (Hassan and Anaya's boss)
- Haider Rifaat as Zahid

== Soundtrack ==
Sabaat

Soundtrack album by Ali Sethi
- Released: 14 March 2020
- Recorded: 2020
- Genre: Television soundtrack
- Length: 4:48
- Language: Urdu
- Label: Hum TV

Music video
- "OST: Sabaat" on YouTube

The OST is composed by Naveed Nashad on lyrics of Kashif Anwar and sung by Ali Sethi.

== Reception ==
Sabaat received positive reviews from critics on its premiere and was praised for its script and the performances of the lead cast. The writer's fine take on multiple themes such as classism, women portrayal and mental health was lauded by critics.

Jasir Shahbaz of The Friday Times criticised the series for its portrayal of western clothes as lazy visual shorthand to label the antagonist as evil or morally corrupt, reinforcing the stereotypes.

== Awards and nominations ==
Date of ceremony	Award	Category	Recipient(s) and nominee(s)	Result	Ref.
October 9, 2021	Lux Style Awards	Best TV Play	Momina Duraid	Nominated	
October 9, 2021	Lux Style Awards	Best Female Actor - Critics	Mawra Hocane	Nominated	
October 9, 2021	Lux Style Awards	Best Female Actor – Viewer’s Choice	Mawra Hocane	Nominated	
October 9, 2021	Lux Style Awards	Best Emerging Talent in TV	Ameer Gilani	Nominated	
October 9, 2021	Lux Style Awards	Best Original Soundtrack	Ali Sethi	Nominated	
November 5, 2021	Pakistan International Screen Awards	Best TV Serial	Momina Duraid	Nominated	
November 5, 2021	Pakistan International Screen Awards	Best Television Director	Shahzad Kashmiri	Nominated	
November 5, 2021	Pakistan International Screen Awards	Best Television Actor - Popular	Ameer Gillani	Nominated	
November 5, 2021	Pakistan International Screen Awards	Best Television Actress - Popular	Sarah Khan	Won	
November 5, 2021	Pakistan International Screen Awards	Best Television Actress - Popular	Mawra Hocane	Nominated	
November 5, 2021	Pakistan International Screen Awards	Best Writer	Kashif Anwar	Nominated	
November 5, 2021	Pakistan International Screen Awards	Best Original Soundtrack	Ali Sethi and Naved Nashad	Nominated	
