= Army Public Schools & Colleges System =

- APSACS
- Punjab, Sindh, Khyber Pakhtunkhwa, Balochistan, Northern Areas, Gilgit

Information
- School type: Army School; semi-private, preparatory
- Motto: "I shall rise and shine!"
- Opened: 1975
- School board: FBISE, CIE and Edexcel.
- Teaching staff: 18,462
- Years offered: 3-4 to 18-19
- Gender: Mixed with separate sections for males and females in most schools.
- Enrollment: 301,855
- Average class size: 28-30
- Education system: SSC, HSSC and GCE
- Classes offered: O and AS/A level, Matriculation, Intermediate
- Language: English-medium education
- Schedule: About 6 hours (7.30 am to 1.30 pm) in summer and (8.00 am to 2.00 pm) in winter
- Houses: Unity; Faith; Discipline; Tolerance
- Alumni: Apsacian
- Directors APSACS: 1 Brig. Ramzan [Director] 2. Brig. Tahir Ali Syed [Regional Director X Corps]
- Branches: 230.
- Website: apsacssectt.edu.pk

The Army Public Schools & Colleges System (APSACS) is a school system operated by the Pakistani Army with over 230 branches. APSAC System operates in 18 regions across Pakistan, with supervision by 18 regional directors. They are sub-divided into 18 regions. APSACS Secretariat serves as central unifying body, which controls technical aspects of the system. It is one of the largest educational systems of Pakistan

== History ==
The Army Public Schools were founded by the Pakistan Army to provide quality education to the children of Pakistan Army personnel and civilians. The schools are well-equipped with labs, at par with any American suburban school. The students can opt for O Levels examination system, a British qualification, or a local qualification.

== 2014 APS Peshawar attack ==
On 16 December 2014, six gunmen affiliated with the Tehrik-i-Taliban Pakistan (TTP) conducted a terrorist attack on one of the Army Public Schools in the northwestern Pakistani city of Peshawar. Several students were killed and injured in the incident. The incident is popularly known as 2014 Peshawar school massacre.

== List of regions ==
- Joint Staff (JS) region: 1 school
- Rawalpindi I (QMG) region: 3 schools
- Rawalpindi II (E in C) region: 6 schools
- Rawalpindi III (X Corps) region: 40 (estimate) schools (largest region) | Regional Director is Brigadier (R) Tahir Ali Syed SI (Military)
- Mangla region: 5 schools
- Multan region: 7 schools
- Lahore region:7 schools
- Karachi region: 19 schools
- Peshawar region: 19 schools
- Quetta region:14 schools
- Gujranwala region: 15 schools
- Bahawalpur region: 10 schools
- Rawalpindi IV (AAD) region:13 schools
- Rawalpindi V (ISI) region: 6 schools
- Rawalpindi VI (GHQ) region: 7 schools
- Nowshera/Attock region: 7 schools
- Abbottabad region: 3 schools
- Cherat region: 6 schools

== Notable alumni ==
- Umera Ahmed: author and former teacher at APSAC
- Saeed Rashid: writer, teacher and historian, former principal at APSACS branches.
- Marium Mukhtiar: Marium Mukhtiar was a Pakistani fighter pilot. She died flying a Pakistan Air Force FT-7PG aircraft that crashed near Kundian in Mianwali District, northwestern Punjab, Pakistan on 24 November 2015. She was the first female Pakistani fighter pilot to die in the line of duty.

== Faculty ==
- Umera Ahmed - a former teacher at Army Public College, Sialkot's Cambridge wing, known for her critically acclaimed works, including Pir-e-Kamil, Meri Zaat Zarra-e-Benishan, Shehr-e-Zaat, Zindagi Gulzar Hai
- Tahira Qazi - Principal of APS&C for Boys Peshawar from 2006 to 2014, and associated with APSACS since 1994, she was killed along with 140+ others by the Taliban while rescuing her school children, in the Peshawar School Attack, in 2014 on 16 December.
- Saeed Rashid PP - writer, teacher and historian, was the Principal of Army Public School Jhelum and Mangla Cantt from 1990 to 1994.

== See also ==
- 2014 Peshawar school attack
- Army Burn Hall College
- Federal Board of Intermediate and Secondary Education
