= Alif (TV series) =

2019 Pakistani television series

- الف
- Genre: Spirituality; Drama; Sufi; Ontology
- Created by: Sana Shahnawaz; Samina Humayun Saeed
- Based on: Alif by Umera Ahmed
- Written by: Umera Ahmad
- Directed by: Haseeb Hassan
- Starring: Hamza Ali Abbasi; Sajal Aly; Ahsan Khan; Kubra Khan
- Opening theme: "Alif Bas"; Singer; Shuja Haider and Momina Mustehsan
- Composer: Shuja Haider
- Country of origin: Pakistan
- Original language: Urdu
- No. of episodes: 24

Production
- Producers: Samina Humayun Saeed; Sana Shahnawaz
- Production locations: Karachi, (Sindh) Pakistan; Istanbul, Turkey
- Camera setup: Multi-camera setup
- Running time: ~42 Minutes
- Production company: Epic Entertainment

Original release
- Network: Geo Entertainment
- Release: 5 October 2019 – 14 March 2020

Alif (Urdu: الف) is a 2019 Pakistani spiritual-romantic television series created by Sana Shahnawaz and Samina Humayun Saeed under their then newly-formed production house, Epic Entertainment. It was written by Umera Ahmad, based on her novel of the same name. It was directed by Haseeb Hassan and starred Hamza Ali Abbasi, Sajal Aly, Kubra Khan, and Ahsan Khan in leading roles.

The drama serial premiered on Geo TV in Pakistan on 5 October 2019. The serial received critical acclaim praising its direction, writing, performances, and cinematography. At the 20th Lux Style Awards, the series won Best Television Writer for Ahmad out of Alif's nine nominations.

== Plot ==
Alif follows Momina Sultan, a struggling actress, and Qalb-e-Momin, a successful filmmaker, on their respective journeys with their careers, families, and religion. Simultaneous to the story of Momin and Momina is that of the tragedy of deceased starlet Husn-e-Jahan. The serial layers both narratives in order to explore the bond of the individuals with God.

The series starts by showing the carefree lifestyle of Qalb-e-Momin, a successful film director, who objectifies women in his films. He is a depressed young man who is involved in all kinds of worldly habits. Momina is a junior artist, who struggles to make the ends meet and is not interested in the entertainment industry. Her brother was an award winning child actor, but his career came to an end since his medical condition. Her parents are only living for her brother and don't care for Momina's life. Sultan, Momina's father, was the makeup artist for deceased actress Husn-e-Jahan. The life of widower, Master Ibrahim, a shoemaker and calligrapher is also showcased. He teaches calligraphy to children and Momina is one of his most adored disciple. She is interested in such spiritual activities and wishes to retire from her life as a junior artist, but due to her brother's condition, she is not able to do so.

One day she auditions for Qalb-e-Momin's movie. Everyone is impressed by her acting, but Qalb-e-Momin asks her to remove her dupatta to be apt for the character. This triggers Momina;she leaves the audition angrily and insults him for objectifying women in his films. Due to her issues in family, she also breaks up with her boyfriend Faisal. Her brother got seriously ill and was taken to the hospital. She is offered a small role in a movie, which she is ready to give up, but the financial situation makes her rethink and finally she accepts the offer. Her brother dies in the hospital and this incident changes her life forever. Abdul Aala, Qalb-e-Momin's grandfather, is a renowned calligrapher in Turkeye. He visits Qalb-e-Momin and asks him to reform his wayward life. His grandfather challenges him to make a movie about spirituality, and if that doesn't succeed, then he should come back to Turkey and teach calligraphy. He takes it easy at first but later becomes serious. Meanwhile, Momina's acting is appreciated internationally, and she becomes a famous actress. She still doesn't forget her roots and also keeps her faith along with her career. The story of Husn-e-Jahan is also shown as flashbacks.

Qalb-e-Momin decides to make the film about his mother, Husn-e-Jahan. According to him, she was a bad mother who remarried after his father's demise. As a child, he didn't know what happened during those times when his mother had to leave him with his grandfather. After the demise of his grandfather, we see a reformed Qalb-e-Momin, in search of answers to his age-old questions. While in doubt about casting, his assistant tells him to contact Momina, as she has become quite famous during this period. She was reluctant in the beginning, but the assistant asks her to read the script and then decide. She starts reading and realizes that Husn-e-Jahan is Qalb-e-Momin's mother, and the story is very different from what she heard from her father about Husn-e-Jahan. Momina agrees and they start filming. The script is still incomplete, as he doesn't know how the story ends. While discussing the title track, Momin says that he wants to invoke spirituality through the track. Momina is surprised by this. They start to develop feelings for each other. Qalb-e-Momin misunderstands the relationship between the assistant and Momina and confronts her. This angers her, and she leaves the film, later she reconciles. On a discussion for the ending of the movie, Momin says that the villain of the story is Sultan (Momina's father). She says its not true. Momina confronts her father, and he narrates the story of Husn-e-Jahan. She was a beautiful and talented actress. Sultan has loved her always, but he keeps his love a secret and follows her all along as her makeup artist. While at the peak of her career, she gets a chance to perform in Turkey. Among the performances, she sees the sufi performance by Taha Abdul Aala, and is mesmerized by the divine energy. Taha also watches Husn-e-Jahan's performance and falls for her beauty. He paints a portrait of her, which angers his fathers. At an exhibition conducted by Abdul Aala, they meet again. They both falls for each other. Husn-e-Jahan was ready to leave her world of glimmer for the love of Taha. She wanted to have a meaningful life. Against his father's will, Taha and Husn-e-Jahan start living together. They marry and have a child, Qalb-e-Momin.They were happy and leading a peaceful life. As Momin became older, his needs also increased. His parents couldn't afford his innocent wishes. This hurts Husn-e-Jahan, so she calls for Sultan and ask him to sell the paintings Taha made of her. Sultan tries to persuade her to return but she rejects him. Later when Taha finds out about the missing painting, he gets angry and leave. Young Qalb-e-Momin thinks all this is because of Sultan. After a few days, Abdul Aala visits them only to inform the death of Taha, which breaks Husn-e-Jahan. She takes Momin to leave for Pakistan, to restart her life. But things were not easy. Her charm has been forgotten by people. Her own mother neglects her and uses her for money. She start dancing in parties, all the while hiding that she has a child. When things get out of hand, she runs away from home again with help of Sultan and his wife. She begs Abdul Aala to take care of Qalb-e-Momin. Abdul Aala also arranges her marriage with Master Ibrahim. Later, she dedicates her life to calligraphy and fixing Qurans with master Ibrahim. As he doesn't want children, the truth about Momin is hidden. After a long time she dies. Sultan tells Momin that his mother left her world for him. Afterwards Momina visits master Ibrahim, he also speaks fondly of Husn-e-Jahan. During marriage she changes her name to Husna, leaving behind the existence of Husn-e-Jahan. He also tells her that he realized her identity years after her demise when Momina sold the painting to him. Abdul Aala also visited him before death to tell him the truth. Momina promises to bring Momin to meet master. But when they came, he was found to be dead.

After reflecting, Momin changes his story and dedicates this movie to his mother. The opening credits show this. The movie becomes a success. At the movie's success party, Momin declares his retirement from film industry, which nobody expected. Later that night, Qalb-e-Momin visits Momina and asks her to come with him to Turkey. She rejects and says that, she has to continue Husn-e-Jahan's dream of calligraphy after Master Ibrahim. She also promises him that she will surely join him. They both hug each other and cry.

The series ends by showing Qalb-e-Momin in Turkey, in front of his childhood home, and Momina at Master Ibrahim's home doing calligraphy.

== Cast ==
- Hamza Ali Abbasi as Qalb-E-Momin : Taha and Husn-E-Jahan's son; Abdul's grandson; Momina's love interest.
  - Pehlaaj Hassan as Qalb-E-Momin (young)
- Manzar Sehbai as Abdul Aala : Taha's father; Momin's grandfather.
- Sajal Aly as Momina Sultan : Sultan and Suraiya's daughter; Momin's love interest.
- Kubra Khan as Husn-E-Jahan : Taha's widow; Momin's mother; Ibrahim's wife.
- Ahsan Khan as Taha Abdul Aala : Abdul's son; Husn-E-Jahan's husband; Momin's father.
- Saleem Meraj as Sultan Shah : Momina's father; Suraiya's husband.
- Osman Khalid Butt as Faisal Khan : Momina's ex boyfriend. (cameo)
- Fareeha Raza as Aqsa
- Musaddiq Malik as Dawood
- Sadaf Kanwal as Neha
- Shakeel Hussain Khan as Akhter
- Yashma Gill as Shelly
- Lubna Aslam as Suraiyya
- Hina Ashfaq as Tina
- Hadi bin Arshad as Jahangir
- Nida Mumtaz as Mumtaz Begum
- Salman Saeed as Abbas
- Saife Hassan as Master Ibrahim : Husn-E-Jahan's second husband.
- George Fulton as Cliff Hector
- Fahad Ahmed as Husn-E-Jahan's brother
- Umer Darr as Shakoor
- Farrukh Darbaar as Jhumar: Sultan's wife; Momina's mother.

=== Guest appearances ===
- Shuja Haider as himself
- Arjumand Azhar as Khalid
- Anas Ali Imran as Abdul Alaa Fan

== Soundtrack ==
The original soundtrack of the series "Alif Bas" is performed by Shuja Haider and Momina Mustehsan with the former serve as the music composer and lyricist for the soundtrack as well.

== Reception ==
Alif received instant acclaim upon its premiere, and became one of the highest-rated in IMDb's Pakistani Dramas category.

While reviewing the first two episodes, Marryam Suleman of Daily Times noted the "strong" script and "beautiful" cinematography and "a lot of efforts" in direction.

Writing for Images Dawn, Sadaf Haider wrote, "With a multi-layered storyline and intelligently developed characters, Team Alif deserves a standing ovation. [...] The entire serial is studded with fantastic performances." She described Khan, Abbasi and Aly's performances, as "outstanding" and "impactful". She concluded by writing, "Overall, this is one of the most refined and artistically pleasing dramas we have seen on our screens in years [...] Team Alif needs to take a bow and sit back and revel in the glow of all this praise; it's well deserved".

Rameeza Naseem from Oye Yeah also lauded the drama, stating in a review of the final episode that it "has been brilliantly written by the veteran writer Umaira Ahmed and kudos to the entire team for creating such a masterpiece, the script, performances, and execution everything is on point".

== Production ==
Prior to release, co-creator Sana Shahnawaz told Something Haute, "You’ll see how the lives of all the characters are connected with this single alphabet." She continued to explain that the series was a "passion project" and that she and the cast and crew were all "super-excited" for the drama to air.

About the premise, Shahnawaz told The Express Tribune that "Alif touches upon the questions you ask yourself; questions about life and what it means."

=== Filming ===
The serial's principal photography began in June 2018, with initial filming happening in Turkey.

Filming for the series took place in Istanbul, Turkey, and Karachi, Pakistan.

== Awards and nominations ==
Date of ceremony	Award	Category	Recipient(s) and nominee(s)	Result	Ref(s)
February 7, 2020	Pakistan International Screen Awards	Best Television Play	Alif	Nominated	
February 7, 2020	Pakistan International Screen Awards	Best Television Director	Haseeb Hassan	Nominated	
February 7, 2020	Pakistan International Screen Awards	Best Television Writer	Umera Ahmad	Nominated	
October 9, 2021	Lux Style Awards	Best TV Play	Alif	Nominated	
October 9, 2021	Lux Style Awards	Best Television Director	Haseeb Hassan	Nominated	
October 9, 2021	Lux Style Awards	Best Television Writer	Umera Ahmad	Won	
October 9, 2021	Lux Style Awards	Best Female Actor - Critics	Sajal Ali	Nominated	
October 9, 2021	Lux Style Awards	Best Female Actor - Viewer's choice	Sajal Ali	Nominated	
October 9, 2021	Lux Style Awards	Best Male Actor - Critics	Hamza Ali Abbasi	Nominated	
October 9, 2021	Lux Style Awards	Best Male Actor - Viewer's choice	Hamza Ali Abbasi	Nominated	
October 9, 2021	Lux Style Awards	Best Emerging Talent in TV	Pehlaaj Hassan	Nominated	
October 9, 2021	Lux Style Awards	Best Ost	Alif Bas - Momina Mustehsan and Shuja Haider	Nominated	
