= 20th Lux Style Awards =

Pakistani film awards ceremony

- Date: 9 October 2021
- Venue: Expo Center, Karachi
- Country: Pakistan
- Hosted by: Dino Ali and Ayesha Omar

Television/radio coverage
- Network: Geo Entertainment
- Produced by: Feriha Altaf
- Directed by: Feriha Altaf

The 20th Lux Style Awards presented by Lux to honor the best in fashion, music, films and Pakistani television of 2020, took place on 9 October 2021 in Karachi.

No films were judged this year as there were no threatrical releases due to the COVID-19 pandemic. The television broadcast was aired on Geo Entertainment on 21 November 2021. The ceremony was hosted by Dino Ali and Ayesha Omar. Pyar Ke Sadqay remained the most awarded TV series by winning 4 awards.

== Winners and nominees ==
The nominations were announced on 26 August 2021.

=== Television ===
Best Television Play	Best Television Director
Ehd-e-Wafa (Hum TV); Deewangi (Geo TV); Yeh Dil Mera (Hum TV); Pyar Ke Sadqay (Hum TV); Raaz-e-Ulfat (Geo TV); Sabaat (Hum TV); Alif (Geo TV)	Farooq Rind - Pyar Ke Sadqay (Hum TV); Zeeshan Ahmed - Deewangi (Geo TV); Siraj-ul-Haque - Raaz-e-Ulfat (Geo TV); Haseeb Hassan - Alif (Geo TV); Saife Hassan - Ehd-e-Wafa (Hum TV)
Best Television Actor (Viewers' Choice)	Best Television Actress (Viewers' Choice)
Danish Taimoor - Deewangi (Geo TV); Ahad Raza Mir - Ehd-e-Wafa (Hum TV); Ahad Raza Mir - Yeh Dil Mera (Hum TV); Imran Ashraf - Kahin Deep Jaley (Geo TV); Bilal Abbas Khan - Pyar Ke Sadqay (Hum TV); Hamza Ali Abbasi - Alif (Geo TV); Faysal Quraishi - Muqaddar (Geo TV)	Yumna Zaidi - Pyar Ke Sadqay (Hum TV); Sajal Aly - Alif (Geo TV); Saboor Aly - Fitrat (Geo TV); Yumna Zaidi - Raaz-e-Ulfat (Geo TV); Ayeza Khan - Mehar Posh (Geo TV); Mawra Hocane - Sabaat (Hum TV); Hiba Bukhari - Deewangi (Geo TV)
Best Television Actor (Critics' Choice)	Best Television Actress (Critics' Choice)
Bilal Abbas Khan - Pyar Ke Sadqay (Hum TV); Ahad Raza Mir - Ehd-e-Wafa (Hum TV); Ahad Raza Mir - Yeh Dil Mera (Hum TV); Hamza Ali Abbasi - Alif (Geo TV); Faysal Quraishi - Muqaddar (Geo TV)	Yumna Zaidi - Pyar Ke Sadqay (Hum TV); Hira Mani - Kashf (Hum TV); Mawra Hocane - Sabaat (Hum TV); Sajal Aly - Alif (Geo TV); Urwa Hocane - Mushk (Hum TV)
Best Television Writer	Best Emerging Talent in Television
Umera Ahmad - Alif (Geo TV); Farhat Ishtiaq - Yeh Dil Mera (Hum TV); Maha Malik - Raaz-e-Ulfat (Geo TV); Mustafa Afridi - Ehd-e-Wafa (Hum TV); Zanjabeel Asim Shah - Pyar Ke Sadqay (Hum TV)	Adnan Samad Khan - Ehd-e-Wafa (Hum TV); Ameer Gillani - Sabaat (Hum TV); Dur-e-Fishan Saleem - Dil Ruba (Hum TV); Nazish Jahangir - Kahin Deep Jaley (Geo TV); Pehlaaj Hassan - Alif (Geo TV)
Best Television Track
Ehd-e-Wafa by Rahat Fateh Ali Khan (Hum TV); Raaz-e-Ulfat - Aima Baig and Shani Arshad (Geo TV); Yeh Dil Mera - Sajal Aly and Naveed Nashad (Hum TV); Pyar Ke Sadqay - Ahmed Jahanzeb, Alia Khan and Mahnoor Khan (Hum TV); Fitrat - Sahir Ali Bagga and Aima Baig (Geo TV); Alif - Momina Mustehsan and Shuja Haider (Geo TV); Sabaat - Ali Sethi and Naveed Nashad (Hum TV)

=== Controversy ===
One of the Pakistan's biggest TV channels ARY Digital refused to submit any dramas to the LSAs. Many of the acclaimed dramas like Dushman e Jaan and Ghisi Piti Mohabbat did not get nominated due to ARY Digital's move. Plays from only two channels (Hum TV and Geo TV) ended up getting nominated.

== Music ==
Best Singer	Best Song
Abbas Ali Khan - Mein Yeh Janu Na; Baluch Twins - Tazhn Teehaar; Khurram Iqbal - Dio Behelta Hai Kahan; Meesha Shafi - Sakal Ban; Mohammad Aziz - Todi; Zeeshan Ali - Surkhwaab's Sanval	Teri Tasveer - Bayaan; Ayi Re - Haniya Aslam; Haiderum - Gul Mohammad and Khurram Iqbal; Lighten Up - Sajid and Zeeshan; Mein Ye Janoun Na - Abbas Ali Khan; Tazhn Teehaar - Baluch Twins

== Special ==
=== Lux Change Maker Awards ===
- Haseena Moin

=== Chairperson's Lifetime Achievement Award ===
- Farida Khanum
