= Romaisa Khan =

Pakistani influencer and actress

- Born: Karachi, Sindh, Pakistan
- Occupations: Influencer; Actress

Romaisa Khan (Urdu: رومیسہ خان) is a Pakistani influencer and actress, who rose to fame on social media due to her comical content creation. She made her acting debut with the 2020 drama serial Masters, and starred in the 2023 film John, latter of which earned her a Lux Style Award.

== Early life ==
Romaisa Khan was born and raised in Karachi, Sindh, Pakistan. She is a daughter of Tanveer Akhtar Khan, a Pakistani stand-up comedian and stage actor who performed for thirty years before passing away due to cancer in 2018. She has two elder sisters and one elder brother.

== Career ==
Romaisa Khan started working in television commercials at a very young age. Later in her teenage years, she started posting private videos on Dubsmash and Musical.ly, and then moved to TikTok and Instagram. To earn savings for professional content creation, she taught at a school when she was in the 12th grade. Later, she changed her account settings to public, and her videos went viral on social media during the COVID-19 pandemic in Pakistan. Publications regarded her as one of the top 10 famous Pakistani TikTokers due to posting comical content, and she won the Pakistan International Screen Award for the Most Entertaining Instagram Celebrity in 2021. She gained further recognition by appearing in vlogs with a fellow YouTuber, Saad ur Rehman.

In 2020, she began her acting career from the drama serial Masters. She also appeared in Rahat Fateh Ali Khan's music video "Rab Jaane". In 2023, her film John was released, in which she portrayed the character role of a school maid. She called it as natural character appearance which did not require any glamour. Despite being a debut, her role received critical acclaim leading her to win the Lux Style Award for Best Actress. After the film, she went on to star in multiple television series, including Hadsa, Chand Tara, Tubelite, Jinn Ki Shadi Unki Shadi, and Dar-e-Nijat.

== Personal life ==
Khan has criticised the proposals for banning TikTok in Pakistan, and called for stricter moderation of the app's content instead. She has also spoken up against late payment issues and a body shaming culture in the media industry for one's weight and skin color, due to which she had faced bully during her early career.

== Filmography ==
=== Television ===
Year	Title	Role	Notes
2020	Masters	Hoorain	
2021	Meri Dilli Wali Girlfriend		
2022	Paristan		
2022	Noor		
2023	Hadsa	Bakhtain	
2023	Chand Tara	Shumaila "Mala" Gulzar	
2024	Tubelite	Ayesha	
2025	Dear Bestie	Dania	
2025	Jinn Ki Shadi Unki Shadi	Nadia Rahman	
2026	Dekh Zara Pyar Se	Warisha	
2026	Dar-e-Nijaat	Hamna	

=== Films ===
- "Rab Jaane" (2021 music video)
- Asaib (2021 short film)
- John (2023)
- Mulazim Online (2025 telefilm)

== Awards and nominations ==
Year	Nominee / work	Award	Result	Ref
Pakistan International Screen Awards
2021	Most Entertaining Instagram Celebrity		Won	
2025	Lifestyle and Culture Creator of the Year		Pending	
Lux Style Awards
2025	John	Film Actor of the Year – Female	Won	
2025	Hadsa	Best Emerging Talent	Nominated	
