= Zanjabeel Asim Shah =

Pakistani screenwriter

Zanjabeel Asim Shah is a Pakistani screenwriter. She is known for writing scripts for television serials and working as head of content for several private network channels. She won the Pakistan International Screen Award for Best TV writer and was nominated three times for the Lux Style Awards. Her Drama Kaneez for A Plus TV is superhit with well known TV and film super stars.

== Career ==
Shah started her career in 2010, working at Geo TV, where she served as the head of production for several television serials. She first wrote the series Saat Pardon Mein in 2012 for the same channel. She gained critical success with revenge-romance Marasim which revolves around the revenge of a mother through her son for what she suffered as a bride. She later wrote serials such as Yeh Mera Deewanapan Hai, about a romantic couple with a huge age difference between them, and Balaa, the story of a limping girl who destroys others' lives due to her own insecurities. Balaa was a commercial success and earned her critical acclaim as well. She also wrote mystery-thriller Cheekh and teen-romance Pyar Ke Sadqay, both of which gained her critical acclaim.

She also worked as head of content on other television networks such as ARY Digital and A-Plus TV.

== Notable work ==
=== Television ===
| Year | Title | Director | Network | Notes | Ref(s) |
|---|---|---|---|---|---|
| 2011 | Ek nazar meri tararf | | Geo Entertainment | | |
| 2012 | Saat Pardon Mein | | Geo Entertainment | | |
| 2014 | Bashar Momin | | Geo Entertainment | | |
| 2014 | Marasim | | A-Plus TV | | |
| 2015 | Yeh Mera Deewanapan Hai | | A-Plus TV | | |
| 2018 | Mere Bewafa | | A-Plus TV | | |
| 2018 | Balaa | Badar Mehmood | ARY Digital | | |
| 2019 | Cheekh | Badar Mehmood | ARY Digital | | |
| 2020 | Pyar Ke Sadqay | Farooq Rind | Hum TV | | |
| 2021 | Koyal | | Aaj Entertainment | | |
| 2021 | Fitoor | | Geo Entertainment | | |
| 2022 | Dil Zaar Zaar | | Geo Entertainment | | |
| 2022 | Fraud | Saqib Khan | ARY Digital | | |
| 2022 | Meri Shehzadi | | Hum TV | | |
| 2022 | Tinkay Ka Sahara | | Hum TV | | |
| 2023 | Hadsa | | Geo Entertainment | | |
| 2023 | Mein | Badar Mehmood | ARY Digital | | |
| 2024 | Shiddat | | Geo Entertainment | | |
| 2024 | Noor Jahan | Mussaddiq Malek | ARY Digital | | |
| 2024 | Habil Aur Qabil | | Geo Entertainment | | |
| 2024 | Bismil | | ARY Digital | | |
| 2024 | Hijr | | Hum TV | | |
| 2025 | Sher | | ARY Digital | | |
| 2025 | Pamaal | | Green Entertainment | | |
| 2025 | Meri Uraan | | Geo Entertainment | Telefilm | |
| 2026 | Aag Aur Paani | Syed Wajahat Hussain | Geo Entertainment | Mini Series | |
| 2026 | Humrahi | | Geo Entertainment | | |

== Awards and nominations ==
| Year | Award | Category | Work | Result | Ref. |
|---|---|---|---|---|---|
| 2014 | Lux Style Awards | Best TV Writer | Marasim | Nominated | |
| 2017 | Lux Style Awards | Best TV Writer | Balaa | Nominated | |
| 2021 | Lux Style Awards | Best TV Writer | Pyar Ke Sadqay | Nominated | |
| 2021 | Pakistan International Screen Awards | Best TV Writer | Pyar Ke Sadqay | Won | |
