= Army Public School =

Army Public School may refer to:

- Indian Army Public Schools
- Army Public Schools & Colleges System, Pakistan
