= Daam-e-Mohabbat =

Pakistani film

- Written by: Umera Ahmed
- Directed by: Nain Manian
- Country of origin: Pakistan
- Original language: Urdu
- No. of episodes: 2 seasons

Production
- Producer: Aamir Khattak

Original release
- Network: TV One Pakistan
- Release: 6 November 2011

Daam-e-Mohabbat (Urdu: ) is an Urdu-language Pakistani long telefilm written by famous author and drama writer Umera Ahmed and directed by Nain Manian. Initially this drama was aired in Pakistan by TV ONE. Daam-e-Mohabbat, This telefilm premiered in Pakistan on 3 September 2011 and has been produced by Aamir Khattak.

== Cast ==
- Jawad Jamal
- Mehwish Hayat
- Ahsan Qadir
- Rida Naqvi
- Arshad Kamal
- Rukhsar
