= Durefishan Saleem =

Pakistani actress (born 1996)

- Born: Lahore, Punjab, Pakistan
- Education: University of London (LLB)
- Occupations: Actress; model
- Years active: 2020–present
- Known for: Kaisi Teri Khudgarzi (2022); Ishq Murshid (2023); Sanwal Yaar Piya (2025); Dar-e-Nijaat (2026)
- Awards: Hum Awards

Durefishan Saleem is a Pakistani actress who works in Urdu television. She made her acting debut with a supporting role in Hum TV's comedy drama Dil Ruba (2020) and subsequently had a leading role the same year in the romantic family Bhaaras. She had her breakthrough after starring in a tragic romance Kaisi Teri Khudgarzi (2022). Saleem received wider popularity with the romance dramas Ishq Murshid (2023) and Sanwal Yaar Piya (2025), she received a nomination at the Hum Award for Best Actress Popular for the former. This success was followed by the spiritual romantic drama Dar-e-Nijaat (2026).

== Early life and education ==
Saleem was born in Lahore, Punjab, Pakistan, to Saleem-ul-Hassan, who worked as a director and producer for PTV in the 2000s. Her mother is Shumaila Saleem. She has three siblings two brothers Abdullah and Rohan and a sister Rameen. She obtained her LLB from University of London. In 2019, she moved to Karachi to make her career in acting.

== Career ==
Saleem made her acting debut with a supporting role of Erum Jameel in Dil Ruba starring Hania Amir and Mohib Mirza. She received a nomination for a Lux Style Awards for Best Emerging Talent in Television. The same year, she starred in a leading role Zoya in family romantic series Bhaaras opposite Zubab Rana and Omer Shahzad. After that, she acted in Pardes with Affan Waheed and Juda Huay Kuch Is Tarha.

In 2022, she portrayed an innocent Mehak in love-dramatic series Kaisi Teri Khudgarzi opposite Danish Taimoor in their first on-screen appearance which gained her wider popularity and recognition and the series crossed more than 1 Billion Views. In 2023, she briefly appeared in the thriller series Jurm alongside Wahaj Ali then in an antholology-series Siyaah, and she portrayed as a motivational speaker in family classic series Jaisay Aapki Marzi opposite Mikaal Zulfiqar. She was also offered to act in Jhok Sarkar along with Farhan Saeed.

She ended the year with her portrayal of a head-strong woman Shibra Shahmeer in the romantic series Ishq Murshid opposite Bilal Abbas Khan. The series emerged as the major success crossed more than 1 billion views. Writing for Redbrick opined, "Khan's transition between two personality is "effortless". In 2024, she starred as a Pashtun woman Zamda in revenge-thriller series Khaie

In 2025, Saleem appeared as a college student in Sanwal Yaar Piya along with Feroze Khan and Ahmed Ali Akbar which also marks their first project together. It became the first Pakistani drama of 2026 to enter the "1 Billion Views Club". In 2026, Saleem appeared in Dar-e-Nijaat opposite Sheheryar Munawar Siddiqui, Nameer Khan and Sahar Hashmi in their first on-screen appearance.

== Other work and media image ==
Fishan has also appeared as a guest on various shows. In 2023, she portrayed as Sara in Siyaah. She was placed in Hello Pakistan's HOT100 list, in the "Trailblazers" category in 2020. Also, in the same year she featured in the "Most Talented New Pakistani Actors" list for her performance in Dil Ruba. The actress serves as a brand ambassador for several products such as Garnier Color Naturals and Vivo V50 and has done several photoshoots. In 2024, she was named among "Top 10 Pakistani Actresses" for her performance in Jaisay Aapki Marzi and Ishq Murshid.

== Filmography ==
=== Television ===
Year	Title	Role	Network	Notes	Ref.
2020	Dil Ruba	Erum Jameel	Hum TV		
2020–2021	Bharaas	Zoya	ARY Digital		
2021	Pardes	Aimen	ARY Digital		
2021	Juda Huay Kuch Is Tarha	Maha	Hum TV		
2022	Kaisi Teri Khudgarzi	Mehak Shamsher	ARY Digital		
2023	Jaisay Aapki Marzi	Aleezay	ARY Digital		
2023–2024	Ishq Murshid	Shibra Shahmeer	Hum TV		
2024	Khaie	Zamda Khan	Geo Entertainment		
2025–2026	Sanwal Yaar Piya	Piya Aslam	Geo Entertainment		
2026–present	Dar-e-Nijaat	Zaryab Habib	ARY Digital		

=== Telefilms ===
Year	Title	Role	Network	Notes	Ref.
2021	Hangor S-131	Sameera	ARY Digital	Telefilm	
2023	Jurm	Ayla Nadeem	Geo Entertainment	Miniseries	
2023	Siyaah	Sara	Green Entertainment	Episode: "Mask Man"	

=== Music videos ===
Year	Song	Artist	Ref
2023	Dard	Asim Azhar	

== Awards and nominations ==
Year	Work	Category	Result	Ref.
Lux Style Awards
2021	Dil Ruba	Emerging Talent of the Year	Nominated	
2022	Pardes	Best TV Actress - Viewers' Choice	Nominated	
2023	Kaisi Teri Khudgarzi	Best TV Actress - Viewer's Choice	Nominated	
2025	Jaisay Aapki Marzi	Best TV Actress - Viewer's Choice	Nominated	
2025	Ishq Murshid	Best Actor of the Year - Female Viewers’ Choice	Nominated	
2025	Khaie	Best Actor of the Year - Female Viewers’ Choice	Nominated	
Hum Awards
2025	Ishq Murshid	Best Actress Popular	Nominated	
2025	Ishq Murshid	Best Actress Jury	Nominated	
2025	Ishq Murshid	Best Onscreen Couple Popular with Bilal Abbas Khan	Won	
2025	Ishq Murshid	Best Onscreen Couple Jury with Bilal Abbas Khan	Won	
Pakistan International Screen Awards
2026	Khaie	Best TV Actress Critics	Nominated	
2026	Ishq Murshid	Best On-Screen Couple with Bilal Abbas Khan	Nominated	
ARY People's Choice Awards
2021	Bharaas	New Emerging Talent (Female)	Won	
2021	Bharaas	Favourite Actress in Bahu Role	Nominated	
