= Shan e Ramazan =

Pakistani live television show

- شانِ رمضان
- Presented by: Waseem Badami
- Country of origin: Pakistan
- Original language: Urdu

Production
- Production location: Karachi
- Editor: ARY Digital
- Camera setup: Multiple-camera setup
- Running time: 152 Minutes

Original release
- Network: ARY Digital
- Release: July 8, 2013

Shan-e-Ramazan (Urdu: شانِ رمضان) is a Pakistani live television special transmission show of ARY Digital. The transmission includes the recitation of the Quran, Naat Sharif and discussion of various topics and highlighting the teachings of Islam and also includes some relevant competitions like quiz and debate competitions. It is currently hosted by Pakistani news anchor and host Waseem Badami on ARY Digital. Previous hosts include Junaid Jamshed.

== History ==
=== ARY Digital ===
Shan-e-Ramazan first started on 8 July 2013 on ARY Digital. It was hosted by Waseem Badami along with Junaid Jamshed as a co-host. It debuted with the Shan-e-Sehr segment and ended on 7 August 2013. Its first kalaam featured Faysal Qureshi along with Badami in a special appearance. In 2014, Shan-e-Ramazan returned and aired from 28 June 2014 to 27 July 2014 with Badami and Junaid Jamshed as co-hosts. The 2014 Shan-e-Ramazan kalaam features Tasleem Ahmed Sabri and sung by Amjad Sabri.

The 2015 edition of Shan-e-Ramazan aired from 17 June 2015 to 17 July 2015. It was co-hosted as a guest host by Junaid Jamshed. The official soundtrack of season 3 features Sanam Baloch, Hina Dilpazeer, Tasleem Ahmed Sabri, Iqrar ul Hassan and sung by Amjad Sabri.

The fourth season aired from 6 June 2016 to 5 July 2016. It was hosted by Waseem Badami while Junaid Jamshed returned as a guest host. The official soundtrack features Anwar Maqsood, Ayaz Samoo and Nida Yasir.

The fifth season aired from 27 May 2017 to 26 June 2017. It was hosted by Iqrar ul Hassan, Waseem Badami and Shahid Afridi. Its official soundtrack features Badami, Afridi along with Humayun Saeed, Faysal Qureshi and Nida Yasir. In 2018, Iqrar ul Hassan was introduced to Shan-e-Ramazan. He used to appear in Shan-e-Ramazan Iftari related segments.

Its eighth season aired on ARY Digital from 26 April 2020 to 26 May 2020. Its ninth season aired from 14 April 2021 to 12 May 2021. Its tenth season started airing from 3 April 2022.Its eleventh season began in March 2023. Its twelfth season begins on March 11.

== Cast ==
Host:

- Waseem Badami

Co-Host:

- Junaid Jamshed (2013–2016)
- Iqrar Ul Hassan (2017-2026)

Naat Khawan:

- Mahmood Ul Hassan Ashrafi
- Zohaib Ashrafi
- Qari Mohsin Qadri
- Muhammad Waseem Wasi

Kids Segment:

- Ahmed Shah
- Abu Bakr Shah
- Umar Shah (2020–2025)
- Muhammad Shiraz
- Muskhan Zahra

== Soundtracks ==
=== ARY Digital ===
Year	Vocals	Starring
2013	Amjad Sabri	Faysal Qureshi
2014	Amjad Sabri	Tasleem Ahmed Sabri
2015	Amjad Sabri	Hina Dilpazeer, Tasleem Ahmed Sabri
2016	Amjad Sabri; Junaid Jamshed	Anwar Maqsood, Ayaz Samoo, Faysal Qureshi, Nida Yasir, Waseem Badami
2017	Amjad Sabri; Junaid Jamshed	Fahad Mustafa, Shahid Afridi, Waseem Badami
2018	Amjad Sabri; Junaid Jamshed; Waseem Badami	Faysal Qureshi
2019	Amjad Sabri; Junaid Jamshed; Waseem Badami	Fahad Mustafa, Faysal Qureshi, Madiha Naqvi, Shaafat Ali
2020	Amjad Sabri; Junaid Jamshed; Waseem Badami	Iqrar-ul-Hassan
2021	Amjad Sabri; Junaid Jamshed; Waseem Badami	Mahmood-ul-Hassan Ashrafi, Madiha Naqvi, Mohsin Qadri, Shaafat Ali, Waseem Wasi, Zohaib Ashrafi
2022	Amjad Sabri; Junaid Jamshed; Waseem Badami	Waseem Badami, Iqrar-ul-Hassan
2023	Amjad Sabri; Waseem Badami	Waseem Badami, Nida Yasir, Sadaf Abdul Jabbar, Iqrar-ul-Hassan,
2024	Junaid Jamshed; Waseem Badami; Amjad Sabri	Waseem Badami, Iqrar-ul-Hassan
2025	Junaid Jamshed; Waseem Badami; Amjad Sabri	Waseem Badami, Iqrar-ul-Hassan
2026	Waseem Badami; Amjad Sabri; Junaid Jamshed	Waseem Badami, Iqrar-ul-Hassan

== Season Overview ==
- Season 1 (2013)
- Season 2 (2014)
- Season 3 (2015)
- Season 4 (2016)
- Season 5 (2017)
- Season 6 (2018)
- Season 7 (2019)
- Season 8 (2020)
- Season 9 (2021)
- Season 10 (2022)
- Season 11 (2023)
- Season 12 (2024)
- Season 13 (2025)
- Season 14 (2026)

== See also ==
- List of Pakistani television serials
- List of Pakistani television stations
- List of programs broadcast by ARY Digital
