= Mohammad Shiraz (YouTuber) =

Pakistani YouTuber

- Born: Gilgit Baltistan, Pakistan
- Occupation: YouTube personality
- Relatives: Muskan Zehra (sister)

YouTube information
- Channel: Shirazi village vlogs
- Years active: 2024-present
- Genres: Family; vlogs
- Subscribers: 1.78 million
- Views: 76 million
- Last updated: August 29, 2025

Mohammad Shiraz (Urdu: محمد شیراز) is a Pakistani YouTube personality who is known for his channel Shirazi Village Vlogs. Shiraz uploaded a video on his channel in 2024, in which he showed his village. Shiraz has been said to be the youngest YouTuber of Pakistan.

== Early life ==
Mohammad Shiraz was born in 2019 into a Balti-speaking family in Ghursay. Shiraz's younger sister, Muskan Zehra, also appears in his videos and later took over the channel when Shiraz stopped vlogging to focus on his education.

== Career ==
Mohammad Shiraz began his vlogging career in early 2024. He would publish videos showcasing his daily life. His videos quickly went viral across Pakistan and eventually around the world. In March 2024, the Prime Minister Shehbaz Sharif met with Shiraz at the Prime Minister's Office. In Ramadan Waseem Badami invited Shiraz to Shan-E-Ramazan which was aired on ARY Digital.
