= Hadsa =

Pakistani television series

- Title screen
- Urdu: حادثہ
- Genre: Family; Crime fiction; Social
- Based on: Women's Rapes
- Written by: Zanjabeel Asim Shah
- Directed by: Wajahat Rauf
- Starring: Hadiqa Kiani; Alyy Khan; Khaqan Shahnawaz; Romaisa Khan; Zhalay Sarhadi
- Opening theme: "Hadsa" by Yashal Shahid
- Country of origin: Pakistan
- Original language: Urdu
- No. of seasons: 1
- No. of episodes: 27

Production
- Producers: Shazia Wajahat; Wajahat Rauf
- Camera setup: Multiple-camera setup
- Running time: 38 Minutes
- Production company: Showcase Productions

Original release
- Network: Geo Entertainment
- Release: 21 August – 5 October 2023

Hadsa is a 2023 Crime thriller Pakistani television series.The series is directed by Wajahat Rauf, produced by Shazia Wajahat and Wajahat Rauf and written by Zanjabeel Asim Shah.It stars Hadiqa Kiani, Alyy Khan, Romaisa Khan and Khaqan Shahnawaz as leads.It first premiered on 21 August 2023 and concluded on 5 October 2023 on Geo Entertainment.The series based on the social issues faced by Women's in Pakistan.

== Plot ==
"Hadsa" intricately weaves a tapestry around the central character, Taskeen, a woman characterized by her unwavering determination and outspoken nature. Initially, the narrative paints a picture of Taskeen's idyllic life, where she finds joy and success alongside her loving husband and children. The unfolding tale centers around the anticipation and excitement of preparing for her eldest son's upcoming wedding, an event that promises to be a joyous celebration of family and love.

However, the storyline takes an abrupt and traumatic turn as an unforeseen and horrific incident disrupts the tranquility of Taskeen's world. The aftermath of this jolting occurrence leaves Taskeen grappling with a myriad of emotions, introducing an unsettling complexity into the once-harmonious narrative of her life. The trauma she experiences becomes a powerful undercurrent, altering the landscape of her existence and casting shadows on her previously contented demeanor.

== Cast ==
- Hadiqa Kiani as Taskeen
- Alyy Khan as Ghazanfar Malik
- Romaisa Khan as Bakhtain
- Khaqan Shahnawaz as Kumail
- Ali Dayan as Turaab
- Zhalay Sarhadi as Bakhtawar
- Saleem Mairaj as Karamdad
- Juggan Kazim as Ammara
- Fareeha Jabeen as Humaira bano
- Fozia Mushtaq as Aalmas begum
- Aamir Qureshi as Saqlain malik
- Abdullah Javed as Waleed
- Sabeena Syed as Maheen; Kumail's fiancé
- Ali Ammar as Sahir; Maheen's ex-fiancé
- Jinaan Hussain as Fouzia Noor; Taskeen's friend and doctor
- Fahad Zahoor Malik as Samri
- Ali Siddiqui as Selfie
- Ossama Ranjha as Yateem
- Hammad butt as Tuni

== Soundtrack ==
"Hadsa"

Song by Yashal Shahid
- Released: 24 August 2023
- Recorded: 2023
- Length: 3:30
- Label: Geo Entertainment
- Composer: Nayel Wajahat
- Lyricist: Ammar Haider
- Producers: Shazia Wajahat; Wajahat Rauf

Music video
- Hadsa OST by Yashal Shahid on YouTube

The official soundtrack of the series is performed by Yashal Shahid on the lyrics Ammar Haider and Music composition by Nayel Wajahat.

== Production ==
On the pivotal date of 10 August 2023, Geo Entertainment, the broadcasting platform behind the much-anticipated series "Hadsa," strategically launched its teaser. This teaser served as a tantalizing glimpse into the forthcoming Crime thriller, building anticipation and sparking intrigue among viewers. As the clock ticked down to the series premiere, this early preview offered a sneak peek into the atmospheres, characters, and gripping narrative that would soon captivate audiences when "Hadsa" officially unfolded on screens. Hadiqa Kiani took to Instagram, sharing an exclusive behind-the-scenes (BTS) glimpse of the series. The post offered fans and followers an insider's view into the making of "Hadsa," providing a sneak peek into the camaraderie among the cast and crew, the set dynamics, and perhaps even a preview of the meticulous effort invested in bringing the Crime thriller to life.

== Controversy ==
On 30 August 2023, the trajectory of the series took a dramatic turn when the Pakistan Electronic Media Regulatory Authority (PEMRA) imposed a ban. The ban was attributed to the portrayal of the story of a real-life rape survivor, prompting widespread discussions and concerns. In response to the controversy, Hadiqa Kiani clarified in an interview that the series was not based on the Motorway Rape Case in 2020, seeking to dispel any misconceptions surrounding the narrative's inspiration.

The unfolding drama took another twist when Wajahat Rauf, the director of the series, delivered news that brought relief to the production. The Islamabad High Court intervened, subsequently lifting the ban. This decision came with a stipulation, crediting both the viewers and the cast and crew for their roles in the series. The announcement marked a significant moment in the series' journey, overcoming regulatory challenges and paving the way for its continuation.

== See also ==
- Geo Entertainment Broadcasting
- Udaari
- Guru
