= Daani =

- Directed by: Khalid Ahmed; Farooq Rind
- Country of origin: Pakistan

Original release
- Release: 2006

Daani is a Pakistani film by Khalid Ahmed and Farooq Rind. It won the best telefilm award at the Kara Film Festival in 2006.
