= Baaghi (TV series) =

Pakistani television series

- Urdu: باغی
- Genre: Drama; Romance; Biographical film
- Based on: The Life of Qandeel Baloch
- Developed by: Urdu 1
- Written by: Shazia Khan
- Directed by: Farooq Rind
- Presented by: Urdu 1 Paragon Productions
- Starring: Saba Qamar; Osman Khalid Butt; Khalid Malik; Ali Kazmi; Sarmad Khoosat; Nimra Khan; Nadia Afgan
- Theme music composer: Shuja Haider
- Opening theme: "Peera Way Peera Way Peera..Main Hojao Naa Baaghi"; Singer(s); Shuja Haider; Lyrics by Sabir Zafar
- Composer: Shuja Haider
- Country of origin: Pakistan
- Original languages: Urdu; Punjabi
- No. of seasons: 1
- No. of episodes: 28

Production
- Producer: Nina Kashif
- Production locations: Sindh; Punjab
- Cinematography: Khaleel Ahmed (KAKA)
- Camera setup: Multi-camera setup
- Running time: 35-45 minutes minus commercials
- Production company: Paragon Productions

Original release
- Network: Urdu 1
- Release: 27 July 2017 – 1 February 2018

Baaghi (Urdu: باغی, lit. 'Rebel') is a Pakistani television series premiered on Urdu 1 on July 27, 2017, and based on the life of the Pakistani model and actress Fauzia Batool (better known as Qandeel Baloch), who was murdered by her brother in the name of honor in July 2016. The screenplay of the drama has been done by Umera Ahmad. Saba Qamar plays the lead character of Fauzia/Qandeel in the series.

Within a week of its launch, Baaghi became the most watched serial being viewed by Pakistanis on YouTube and has also been the limelight of controversies, as expected. The drama is one of the most hyped TV serials ever produced in Pakistan.

It won three awards at the 17th Lux Style Awards, including Best TV Play and Best Actress for Saba Qamar.

== Plot ==
Fauzia Batool, a beautiful young girl, lives in a village house with her parents and siblings. Fauzia has a younger brother, a younger sister, and an elder brother, Rahim, who is married to Asma. Fauzia's older sister Nazia is married and faces domestic abuse regularly.

Fauzia's sister-in-law, Asma, is manipulative and completely controls her husband. Asma's brother Sajid falls in love with Fauzia and compels Asma to ask for her hand. Asma is firmly against their marriage, as she does not want her brother to marry such a 'sharp' woman. Sajid manages to convince his sister, who, in turn, convinces Rahim, and that too very quickly. Rahim and Asma talk to Fauzia's parents about the proposal. Fauzia's parents are initially reluctant but succumb to Rahim and Sajid's mother's pressure and eventually confirm the proposal. However, Fauzia rejects the proposal because Sajid is a lazy, jobless person who would sit on the road all day doing nothing. Fauzia dreams of becoming famous and independent and realizes that marrying Sajid would derail her dreams. But Fauzia's family tells her that it is too late to turn down the proposal, as the whole village knows about it.

Fauzia falls in love with Abid, the cosmetic shop owner in her neighbourhood who recently returned from Dubai. Abid promises to allow and help Fauzia to accomplish all her dreams and gives her many magazines of models. Fauzia's parents reject Abid's proposal. Her wedding day with Sajid arrives, but she escapes right before the ceremony.

Fauzia and Abid get married. However, Abid loses interest in Fauzia after their marriage. Soon, they have a son. Fauzia discovers that Abid is having an affair with Ruby, leading to conflict between Fauzia and Abid. Abid physically abuses Fauzia. He divorces her and throws her out of his house. Devastated, she leaves the village and travels to Karachi to be a model. The agency Fauzia works for sends her a beautician, Gogi/Rehaan, who gives her a makeover and improves her English.

Meanwhile, Abid, who has divorced Fauzia, marries Ruby and gives his sister legal custody of his child. Fauzia faces exploitation at the hands of her employer and the owner of the women's hostel where she lives. Unable to find new work, Fauzia returns to her ex-boss, Gauhar, and agrees to work on Gauhar's terms to earn money. She starts uploading her videos on social media with the name Kanwal. She gains a huge fan following, as well as bashers and haters.

Fauzia meets Shehryar, a widower who lost his wife and daughter in an accident a few years ago. They eventually fall in love, but Fauzia does not tell him about her marriage, divorce or son. Fauzia finally reconciles with her family. Fauzia is ready to marry Shehryar and leave behind the world of glamour.

Fauzia's life turns upside down when a TV channel reveals Kanwal's true identity. The channel airs her ex-husband's video, where he accuses Fauzia of abandoning her son for the sake of her ambition. Though initially upset, Shehryar gives Fauzia a chance to explain her side of the story. Shehryar is touched hearing about Fauzia's struggle.

Fauzia's younger brother, who has become a drug addict, is mocked by his friends and peers for having a sister who has lived life on her terms. He drugs her and then strangles her in as she lies semi-conscious. Fauzia's whole life flashes before her eyes as she makes feeble attempts to free herself. Eventually, she dies, and her brother runs away. The following day her younger sister finds her dead body in the room. The news soon spreads like wildfire, and the media breaks the news, which ultimately reaches Shehryar, who is also numb with grief. Fauzia's brother gets arrested for her murder.

== Cast ==
- Saba Qamar as Fauzia Batool/ Kanwal Baloch
- Aliee Shaikh as Gohar
- Osman Khalid Butt as Shahreyar Hasan (Kanwal's love interest)
- Khalid Malik as Rehaan (Kanwal's best friend)
- Ali Kazmi as Abid (Fauzia's husband)
- Sarmad Khoosat as Raheem (Fauzia's elder brother)
- Irfan Khoosat as Fauzia's father
- Saba Faisal as Fauzia's mother
- Nimra Khan as Munni Fauzia's younger sister
- Nadia Afgan as Asma (Fauzia's sister-in-law)
- Seemi Raheel as Abid's mother
- Syed Tabrez Ali Shah as Munna Fauzia's younger brother
- Farah Tufail as Fauzia's sister
- Syed Babrik Shah
- Laila Zuberi as Shehreyar's mother
- Mani
- Tahir Jatoi
- Sophia Mirza
- Tahir Latif Saqi
- Farhana Maqsood as Abid's second wife
- Muskan Jay as Abid's sister
- Rabia Noreen as Samreen

=== Cameo appearances ===
- Yasir Hussain as Sohail Warraich
- Yasir Nawaz
- Ali Saqi
- Hareem Farooq as a Pakistan Idol Judge
- Goher Mumtaz as a Pakistan Idol Judge
- Nomi Ansari as a Pakistan Idol Judge
- Hira Tareen
- Naeem Tahir
- Ismat Zaidi as Chaudhrani Ji
- Ahmed Godil
- Hasan Soomro
- Farooq Rind

== Reception ==
The series was a critical and commercial success, becoming one of the highest-rated Pakistani drama of 2017. Qamar's performance was widely praised by the critics and her portrayal of the actress and singer was applauded even before its release. Neeha of The Nation wrote, "Without a doubt, Qamar has done an outstanding job", whereas a reviewer from The Express Tribune said she "slayed the social media star with such finesse".

== Awards and nominations ==
Award	Category/Recipient(s)	Result
17th Lux Style Awards	Best Television Play	Won
17th Lux Style Awards	Farooq Rind - Best Drama Director	Nominated
17th Lux Style Awards	Saba Qamar - Best TV Actress	Won
17th Lux Style Awards	Shuja Haider - Best Original Soundtrack	Won
Masala! Awards	Saba Qamar - Breakthrough Performance of the year	Won

== Release ==
=== Broadcast ===
Baaghi was originally broadcast on Urdu1 from 27 July 2017 to 1 February 2018.

In 2025, it aired in India on Colors Cineplex.
