= Pardes (2021 TV series) =

Pakistani drama serial

- Genre: Social; Tragedy; Family drama
- Written by: Sarwat Nazir
- Directed by: Marina Khan
- Starring: Sarmad Khoosat; Shaista Lodhi; Bushra Ansari; Affan Waheed; Dur-e-Fishan Saleem
- Theme music composer: Naveed Nashad
- Opening theme: Amanat Ali; Sithi Shah
- Country of origin: Pakistan
- Original language: Urdu
- No. of episodes: 35

Production
- Producers: Humayun Saeed; Shehzad Naseeb
- Editors: Akhter Zia; Aslam Channa; Abdul Wahab
- Camera setup: Multi-camera
- Running time: 35-40 minutes per episode
- Production company: Six Sigma Plus

Original release
- Network: ARY Digital
- Release: 17 May – 13 September 2021

Pardes (transl. Foreign Land) is a Pakistani television series directed by Marina Khan and written by Sarwat Nazir. It stars Bushra Ansari, Sarmad Khoosat, Shaista Lodhi, Affan Waheed and Dur-e-Fishan Saleem in prominent roles. Produced by Humayun Saeed and Shehzad Naseeb under Six Sigma Plus, the series aired double episodes weekly on ARY Digital. The series explores how a man's working abroad affects his relationships and his children's lives.

== Plot ==
Ahsan, the sole breadwinner of his family, works tirelessly to provide for his loved ones. His younger brother, Asim, is unemployed and lazy, but has a soft spot for their cousin, Nausheen. Despite his lack of employment, Asim's desire to marry Nausheen seems impossible. However, fate intervenes when Nausheen's father catches them together, leading to an impromptu marriage. As the family grows, Ahsan's mother, Mumtaz, pressures him to seek better opportunities abroad. Reluctantly, Ahsan leaves behind his wife, Zubeida, and daughter, Aimen, to work overseas in Muscat, toiling endlessly to provide for them while Zubeida works hard to keep the family afloat.

As time passes, Ahsan's children, Aimen and Zaid, enter adulthood. Aimen shoulders the responsibilities that Zaid neglects. Aimen's classmate, Ibad, harbors unrequited feelings for her. After years of living abroad, Ahsan returns home, his health significantly deteriorated. On his deathbed, he attempts to arrange Aimen's marriage to their cousin, Salman, but she refuses, fearing a life similar to her mother's because Salman has a future plan to go abroad for his career. Instead, she proposes Ibad as an alternative, and they get married.

After Ahsan's passing, Aimen begins her new life with Ibad. However, she faces challenges in her marital home, particularly from Ibad's stepsisters and brother-in-law. When Ibad embarks on a business trip to England, Aimen's past traumas resurface, and their marital life is put to the test.

== Cast ==
=== Main cast ===
- Dur-e-Fishan Saleem as Aimen, Zubeida and Ahsan's daughter
  - Emaan Nayyab as Aimen (young)
- Affan Waheed as Ibad, Aimen's class fellow
- Shaista Lodhi as Zubeida "Zubi", Ahsan's wife and Aimen's mother
- Sarmad Khoosat as Ahsan, Zubeida's husband and Aimen's father

=== Supporting cast ===
- Bushra Ansari as Mumtaz, Ahsan and Asim's mother
- Gohar Rasheed as Asim, Ahsan's younger brother
- Shermeen Ali as Nausheen "Noshi", Asim's wife
- Atiqa Odho as Raheela, Ibad's mother
- Faiza Gillani as Nabeela, Ahsan's sister
- Hammad Shoaib as Salman, Nabeela's son
- Atabik Mohsin as Zaid, Aimen's brother
- Aliha Chaudry as Aliya, Ahsan's sister
- Jinaan Hussain as Sheema, Ibad's step-sister
- Yasir Ali Khan as Rohail, Ibad's step-brother
- Hina Javed as Rija, Rohail's wife
- Usman Mazhar as Manzoor, Nabeela's husband

=== Recurring cast ===
- Syed Mohammad Ahmed as Sadeeq, Nausheen's father
- Shazia Qaiser as Nausheen's mother and Mumtaz's sister

== Production ==
In March 2021, Shaista Lodhi revealed that she would return to acting after a three-year break with Marina Khan's directed Pardes, playing Zubaida, a strong and sacrificing woman coping with her husband's absence who works abroad. Lodhi was approached by Humayun Saeed and agreed to join the cast because Marina Khan was the director. Sarmad Khoosat was cast to portray Ahsan, the eldest sibling and sole breadwinner of the family.

== Reception ==
=== Critical reception ===
Gaitee Ara Siddiqi of The News International praised the series for its realistic portrayal, well-developed characters, and engaging storyline, with standout performances of Lodhi, Khoosat and Ansari.

=== Television rating points (TRPs) ===
Date	Ep#	TRPs	Ref.
14 June 2021	9 & 10	6.6	
21 June 2021	11 & 12	7.4	
28 June 2021	13 & 14	6.3	
26 July 2021	21 & 22	7.1	
2 August 2021	23 & 24	7.0	

== Accolades ==
Ceremony	Categories	Recipients	Result	Ref.
21st Lux Style Awards	Best TV Actor-Critics' Choice	Sarmad Khoosat	Nominated	
21st Lux Style Awards	Best TV Actress-Viewers' Choice	Dur-e-Fishan Saleem	Nominated	
21st Lux Style Awards	Best TV Writer	Sarwat Nazir	Nominated	
