= Sar e Aam =

Former Pakistani live television show

- Created by: ARY News
- Presented by: Iqrar Ul Hassan
- Starring: Iqrar Ul Hassan
- Opening theme: Exposing Crime
- Country of origin: Pakistan
- Original language: Urdu
- No. of episodes: 300+

Production
- Production location: All over Pakistan
- Camera setup: Multiple-camera setup
- Running time: 38-40 minutes

Original release
- Network: ARY News
- Release: 2012

Sar e Aam was a Pakistani Urdu-language investigative crime show aired on ARY News from 2012 to 2026. It was hosted by Iqrar Ul Hassan and was known for exposing corruption in Pakistan through undercover investigations. It ended in 2026 when Iqrar Ul Hassan resigned from ARY News after a long career.

== History ==
The show was broadcast every Saturday at 7 PM on ARY News. The program became notable for exposing corrupt individuals, fake businesses, and unauthentic or substandard products and services, including cases where well-known company names were misused or imitated. Its general focus was on raising public awareness about hidden criminal and fraudulent activities in society. The show was also known for conducting field investigations that sometimes led to the sealing or shutdown of illegal industries, unauthorized home-based businesses, and other fraudulent operations.
