= Bebaak (TV series) =

Pakistani drama television series

- Written by: Raskhshanda Rizvi; Abdul Khaliq Khan
- Directed by: Mohsin Talat
- Music by: SK Salman Khan
- Country of origin: Pakistan
- Original language: Urdu
- No. of episodes: 52

Production
- Executive producer: Mommal Shunaid
- Production company: Moomal Entertainment

Original release
- Network: Hum TV
- Release: 8 December 2021 – 18 February 2022

Bebaak (Urdu: بے باک, lit. 'Bold') is a Pakistani drama television series produced by Moomal Shuanid under Moomal Entertainment. It features Yashma Gill alongside Srha Asghar, Ali Ansari, Adnan Jaffar, Raeed Muhammad Alam, and Faiq Khan. The series premiered on 8 December 2021, replacing Sila-e-Mohabbat. Bebaak revolves around Wafa, a poor university student who aspires to be rich and successful.

== Plot ==
Wafa receives a scholarship to a prestigious university in the city and pretends to be wealthy. Her father is a gambler, and her mother, a teacher, struggles to make ends meet, but Wafa is indifferent to her mother's plight. After attending a job interview, Wafa is hired. She accepts an invitation to the wedding of Meesam and Shiza. Meesam marries Shiza, but Shiza, noticing Meesam speaking with Wafa, confronts him. Asad is married to Sunaina, with whom he has a daughter named Laiba.

Asad asks Wafa to marry him. Wafa agrees, and they marry the following week, without knowledge of her family. Meanwhile, at Wafa's house, her brother dies of cancer. Asad returns to his first wife Sunaina.

After Wafa's father learns that his daughter has married on her own, he divorces Wafa's mother. Shiza's father was about to marry Wafa, but Shiza was against it. Wafa finds out that she had a brain tumour later apologising to everyone at Meesam's house. Meesam has a son, later naming him Asad. Subsequently, Wafa has a son, and the father ends up homeless.

== Cast ==
- Yashma Gill as Wafa
- Srha Asghar as Shiza
- Ali Ansari as Mesum
- Raeed Muhammad Alam as Farhad
- Adnan Jaffar as Waqar
- Faiq Khan as Asad
- Laila Wasti as Nafisa
- Farah Nadeem as Samina
- Adnan Shah Tipu as Sharafat
- Amna Malik as Sunaina
- Ismat Zaidi as Mesum and Asad's mother

== Reception ==
In early February 2022, it received television ratings of 4–5 TRPs.
