= Dar-e-Nijaat =

2026 Pakistani television series

- Poster
- Genre: Drama; Romance; Spiritual; Family drama
- Written by: Umera Ahmed
- Directed by: Saqib Khan
- Starring: Sheheryar Munawar; Dur-e-Fishan Saleem; Nameer Khan; Sahar Hashmi; Romaisa Khan; Sania Saeed; Saba Hameed; Faran Tahir; Nadia Afgan; S.Z
- Country of origin: Pakistan
- Original language: Urdu
- No. of seasons: 1
- No. of episodes: 31

Production
- Producers: Sheheryar Munawar Siddiqui; Sonya Khan
- Production locations: Karachi; Islamabad; Baku
- Camera setup: Multi-camera setup
- Running time: 33 minutes
- Production company: 3's Entertainment

Original release
- Network: ARY Digital
- Release: 1 August 2026 – present

Dar-e-Nijaat is a 2026 Pakistani spiritual romantic drama series written by Umera Ahmed and directed by Saqib Khan. Produced by 3's Entertainment, the series stars Sheheryar Munawar, Durefishan Saleem and Nameer Nawaz Khan in lead roles, alongside Sahar Hashmi, Romaisa Khan, Sania Saeed, Saba Hameed, Faran Tahir and Nadia Afgan. It premiered on ARY Digital on 1 August 2026.

In October 2026, ARY Digital announced that the drama had accumulated more than a 1.7 billion views across social media platforms after the broadcast of 23 episodes.

== Plot ==
The series follows Zaryab (Dur-e-Fishan Saleem), a young woman who has been in a relationship with her childhood friend Zamil (Nameer Nawaz Khan). After receiving admission to Harvard University, she considers giving up the opportunity for the sake of her relationship. However, their relationship eventually falls apart when Zamil leaves her and marries another woman.

The experience leaves Zaryab emotionally distressed and struggling with her decisions. Her life subsequently becomes connected with Abu Bakar (Sheheryar Munawar), a religious and principled man whose family background and outlook differ from those of Zamil. The series depicts the consequences of Zaryab and Zamil's relationship and examines how religious beliefs and social expectations shape the characters' decisions.

== Cast ==
- Sheheryar Munawar as:
  - Abu Bakar Aman, Khushbakht & Aman’s son; Zaryab’s husband
  - Chaudhry Aman Ali Gujjar, Khushbakht’s husband, Abu Bakar’s father; Zaryab’s father-in-law
- Dur-e-Fishan Saleem as Zaryab Habib, Habib & Shamsa’s daughter, Faryal and Tanya’s sister; Abu Bakar’s wife, Aman & Khushbakht’s daughter-in-law, Zamil’s ex-fiancée
- Nameer Nawaz Khan as Zamil Hussain, Hamna’s husband, Zaryab’s ex-fiancé
- Romaisa Khan as Hamna, Zamil’s wife
- Sania Saeed as Khushbakht Qudrat Ullah, Qudrat Ullah’s daughter, Malik Asad’s sister; Aman’s wife, Abu Bakar’s mother, Zaryab’s mother-in-law
  - Sahar Hashmi as young Khushbakht a.k.a Bela
- Tara Mahmood as Nafeesa, Zamil's mother
- Saba Hameed as Kishwar Jahan, Habib’s mother, Shamsa’s mother-in-law, Faryal, Zaryab and Tanya’s grandmother; Abu Bakar’s grandmother-in-law
- Faran Tahir as Habib Ahmed, Kishwar’s son, Shamsa’s husband, Faryal, Zaryab and Tanya’s father; Abu Bakar’s father-in-law
- Naveen Naqvi as Shamsa, Habib's wife, Faryal, Zaryab and Tanya's mother
- Saad Azhar as Malik Asad, Federal minister of indistry and production, Khusbakht's brother
- Nadia Afgan
- Adnan Jaffar as Hussain, Zamil's father
- Adnan Shah Tipu as Hamna's father, Zamil's fatherin law and Abu baker's cook
- Mahmood Aslam as Qudratullah, Khushbakht's father
- Salma Zafar Asim, Khushbakht's mother
- Nooray Zeeshan as Tanya, Zaryab's younger sister
- Dania Enwer as Faryal, Zaryab and Tanya's elder sister
- Zayb Khan as Shuja, Faryal's husband
- Noor Xarmina as Beenish, Abubakar's university batch mate in the US, Shuja's first cousin
- Urooj Khalid, Zamil's sister

== Music ==
The soundtrack of Dar-e-Nijaat consists of five songs released as an official album in July and August 2026, followed by an additional single, "Mujhse Kyun Bair Kiya", released in October 2026. The soundtrack features vocals by Nabeel Shaukat Ali, Osaf Fateh Ali Khan, Sajjad Fateh Ali, Saad Hayat, Maheen Siddiqui, Shahzaib Ghafoor and Sehar Gull Khan. The music was released under the ARY Digital label, with "Alvida Alvida" composed and produced by Naveed Nashad and lyrics by Qamar Nashad.

The first five tracks were released as part of the official soundtrack album, while "Mujhse Kyun Bair Kiya" was released separately as an additional original soundtrack in October 2026. The title song "Alvida Alvida" was composed and produced by Naveed Nashad, with lyrics by Qamar Nashad. "Mujhse Kyun Bair Kiya" features music and composition by Naveed Nashad, lyrics by Qamar Nashad and arrangement, mixing and mastering by Salman Naseer.

=== Track listing ===
Original soundtrack
No.	Title	Singer(s)	Length
1.	"Alvida Alvida"	Nabeel Shaukat Ali and Osaf Fateh Ali Khan	5:23
2.	"Dar Ba Dar"	Sajjad Fateh Ali	1:08
3.	"Hanju"	Osaf Fateh Ali Khan	1:08
4.	"Main Tere Se"	Saad Hayat and Maheen Siddiqui	3:14
5.	"Shaamein Tere Bina"	Shahzaib Ghafoor	2:44
6.	"Mujhse Kyun Bair Kiya"	Naveed Nashad and Sehar Gul Khan	3:51
7.	"Ishqa"	Naveed Nashad,Nabeel Shaukat Ali and Osaf Fateh Ali Khan	4:12
Total length:			17:28

== Production ==
By May 2026, Dar-e-Nijaat was in production at 3's Entertainment, a company jointly owned by Sheheryar Munawar, Sonya Khan and Salman Iqbal. In an interview with Dawn, Munawar described his role as challenging and discussed developing its complexity. This series was written by Umera Ahmed and directed by Saqib Khan, marking the 3's entertainment's first television drama serial. Munawar shared a promotional teaser in July 2026 featuring himself, Dur-e-Fishan Saleem and Nameer Khan.

Principal photography for the series filmed in Karachi, Sindh, utilizing venues such as The Penthouse Karachi for luxury residential scenes and the Pearl-Continental Hotel, Karachi for corporate and hospitality backdrops, while supplementary production and post-production work took place at Studio M in Islamabad. International filming took place in Baku, Azerbaijan, where they filmed at the European-style Knightsbridge Residence in Baku White City and the waterfront attraction Mini Venice.

== Broadcast ==
The series premiered on ARY Digital on 1 August 2026. It airs on Fridays and Saturdays at 8:00 pm Pakistan Standard Time.

On 11 September 2026, Dawn Images reported that ARY Digital would move the online distribution of selected dramas, including Dar-e-Nijaat, exclusively to its streaming platform, ARY Plus, from 17 September. The decision formed part of the broadcaster's wider shift towards distributing its drama programming through its own streaming service rather than its official YouTube channel. By the time of the change, 13 episodes of Dar-e-Nijaat had been released on YouTube. Episodes 14 and 15 became available exclusively on ARY Plus, marking the transition of the drama's new online episodes to the platform. The change affected digital availability in Pakistan, while the television broadcast on ARY Digital continued according to its regular schedule.

== Reception ==
=== Critical reception ===
Gaitee Ara Siddiqi from the The Friday Times, praised Umera Ahmed's writing and the series' depiction of generational differences, parental expectations and the social pressures experienced by affluent young people in the opening episodes.

Journalist Hafsah Sarfraz, writing for Dawn Images, criticised the narrative decision to have Zaryab enter another marriage after her previous relationship ended. The article argued that the character's educational ambitions and opportunity to study at Harvard could have provided an alternative direction for her development.

In November 2026, television host Nadia Hussain criticised Zaryab's behaviour towards Abu Bakar, arguing that the character needed professional help rather than marriage as a solution to her problems. Her comments added to the public debate about the portrayal of relationships, emotional healing and mutual responsibility in the drama.

=== Cast responses ===
In September 2026, Dur-e-Fishan Saleem addressed criticism surrounding her character's emotional recovery following her relationship with Zamil. She explained that, in her interpretation, the story questioned the differing standards applied to men and women when they make mistakes and seek forgiveness. The discussion followed episodes in which Zaryab experienced an emotional breakdown and received help from Abu Bakar.

In another interview reported by Dawn, actress Sania Saeed discussed the series' portrayal of morality, family relationships and traditional gender roles. She also commented on the audience's reaction to the relationship between her character, Khushbakht, and Abu Bakar, played by Sheheryar Munawar.

In October 2026, Sheheryar Munawar discussed his portrayal of Abu Bakar in an interview with BBC Asian Network. He described the character as imperfect, identifying people-pleasing and a tendency to act as a rescuer as some of his flaws. His comments were reported by both Dawn and The Express Tribune.
