= Yashma Gill =

Pakistani actress (born 1993)

- یشما گل
- Born: October 19, 1993 (age 32); Jahanian, Khanewal, Punjab, Pakistan
- Citizenship: Pakistani
- Occupation: Actress
- Years active: 2016–present

Yashma Gill (Urdu: یشما گل) is a Pakistani film and television actress. She is known for her lead roles in several television productions including Kab Mere Kehlaoge (2018), Bebaak (2021–22) and Pyar Ke Sadqay (2020).

In 2019, she launched her YouTube channel.

== Personal life ==
Gill is from Karachi, Pakistan.

In an interview with Samina Peerzada, she revealed her spiritual journey and how she reverted to Islam after a phase of being an atheist.

Gill studied psychology at La Trobe University in Australia and then returned to her home country.

== Filmography ==
=== Film ===
| Year | Title | Role | Notes |
|---|---|---|---|
| 2019 | Wrong No. 2 | Dancer | Special appearance in song "Gali Gali" |

=== Telefilm ===
| Year | Title | Role | Network | Notes |
|---|---|---|---|---|
| 2017 | Look Chup Jana | Alizey | A-Plus TV | Telefilm |

=== Short film ===
| Year | Title | Role | Network | Notes |
|---|---|---|---|---|
| 2022 | Truth Or Dare | Saima | See Prime | Short film |

=== Television ===
| Year | Title | Role | Network |
|---|---|---|---|
| 2016-2017 | Meri Saheli Meri Bhabi | Mooni | Geo Entertainment |
| 2017 | Iltija | Tayyaba | ARY Digital |
| 2017 | Ghari Do Ghari | Sidra | A-Plus TV |
| 2017–2018 | Qurban | Mariam | ARY Digital |
| 2017–2018 | Ghar Titli Ka Par | Erum | Geo Entertainment |
| 2017–2018 | Kab Mere Kehlaoge | Batool | ARY Digital |
| 2018 | Kahan Ho Tum | Bushra | A-Plus TV |
| 2018 | Haara Dil | Fizab | A-Plus TV |
| 2018 | Kis Din Mera Viyah Howay Ga (Season 04) | Taniya | Geo Entertainment |
| 2018 | Ki Jaana Main Kaun | Anaya Taimoor | Hum TV |
| 2018 | Khatakaar | Zareen | Play Entertainment |
| 2018–2019 | Umm-e-Haniya | Saba | Geo Entertainment |
| 2018–2019 | Ab Dekh Khuda Kya Karta Hai | Noor Saba | Geo Entertainment |
| 2019 | Gustakh Dil | Shamzi | Express Entertainment |
| 2019 | Do Tola Pyar | Mahira | Play Entertainment |
| 2019 | Piya Naam Ka Diya | Ramsha | Geo Entertainment |
| 2019-2020 | Alif | Shelly | Geo Entertainment |
| 2020 | Pyar Ke Sadqay | Shanzay Meer | Hum TV |
| 2020-2021 | Gustakh | Aaniya | Express Entertainment |
| 2020-2021 | Tasveer | Haya | Play Entertainment |
| 2021 | Phaans | Hafsa | Hum TV |
| 2021 | Mujhe Khuda Pay Yaqeen Hai | Nazneen | Geo Entertainment |
| 2021 | Azmaish | Shiza | ARY Digital |
| 2021-2022 | Bebaak | Wafa | Hum TV |
| 2022-2023 | Ishq Munafiq | Mehwish | Play Entertainment |
| 2023 | Khel | Saman | Hum TV |
| | "Haq Mehar" | Wirsa | Geo Entertainment |

=== Anthology series ===
| Year | Title | Role | Network | Notes |
|---|---|---|---|---|
| 2018 | Kabhi Band Kabhi Baja | Meher | Express Entertainment | Episode: "Bunti Aur Bublu" |
| 2021 | Makafaat Season 3 | Saira | Geo Entertainment | Episode "Usool Aur Sachai" |
| 2023 | Ahsaas | Sheeba | Express Entertainment | Episode 29 Dukandar |
