= List of Pakistani films of 2020 =

List of Pakistani films by year 2020

This is a list of Pakistani films to be released in 2020. This year was greatly impacted by the COVID-19 pandemic, and numerous films originally scheduled for 2020 were postponed to 2021 as a result.

== Releases ==
=== January – April ===
Opening		Title	Director	Cast	Production House	Ref.
J A N	5	Too Much	Saleem Murad	Arbaaz Khan, Jahangir Khan, Asif Khan, Diya Butt, Naseem Hassan, Feroza Khan	Ayoub Mirpuri Presents	
J A N	30	Balochabad	Shakir Shad	Sarfraz Muhammad, Allah bux Aleef, Ahsan Danish, Anita Jaleel	Shahtul Films Dhanz Films	
J A N	31	Showgirls of Pakistan	Saad Khan	Afreen Khan, Reema Jaan, Uzma Khan, Saad Khan, Nadia Khan	Savta and Other Memory Media	
F E B	28	Record	Kashif Khan	Serha Asghar, Inayat Khan, Maharukh Rizvi, Faisal Akhtar Asad Siddiqi	Kashif Khan Productions	

== Events ==
=== Award ceremonies ===
Date	Event	Host	Location
25 January 2020	4th Hum Style Awards	Aamina Sheikh	Karachi, Pakistan
7 February 2020	1st Pakistan International Screen Awards	Hareem Farooq	Coca-Cola Arena, Dubai, United Arab Emirates
