= Shehr-e-Zaat =

Pakistani drama television series

- Shehr-e-Zaat title screen
- Genre: Drama; Romance; Spiritual
- Based on: Shehr-e-Zaat by Umera Ahmad
- Written by: Umera Ahmad
- Screenplay by: M. Wasi-ul-din; Saad Salman
- Directed by: Sarmad Sultan Khoosat
- Creative director: Munir Ahmad
- Starring: Mahira Khan; Mohib Mirza; Mekaal Zulfiqar
- Theme music composer: Muzaffar Ali original composer of OST
- Opening theme: Yaar Ko Hum Ne Ja Ba Ja Dekha by Abida Parveen
- Composer: Mad Music
- Country of origin: Pakistan
- Original language: Urdu
- No. of episodes: 19

Production
- Executive producers: Abdullah Kadwani; Asad Qureshi
- Producer: Momina Duraid
- Production locations: Karachi, Thatta, Lahore
- Cinematography: Khizer Idrees
- Editors: Syed Tanveer Alam; Afzal Fayaz
- Camera setup: Multi-camera setup
- Running time: 45–50 Minutes
- Production companies: Moomal Productions; 7th Sky Entertainment

Original release
- Network: Hum TV
- Release: 29 June – 2 November 2012

Shehr-e-Zaat (Urdu: شہرذات, English: City of Self) is a 2012 Pakistani spiritual romantic drama serial based on the novella of the same name by Umera Ahmad. It is directed by Sarmad Sultan Khoosat, and produced by Momina Duraid and Abdullah Kadwani. It stars Mahira Khan, Mikaal Zulfiqar and Mohib Mirza in the leads.

Shehr-e-Zaat a young woman's journey as she strives to make up for all the time she has lost in worldly pursuits and finally give in to Allah's will, after learning the harsh realities of life, she traveled from Self to Subsistence. It premiered on 29 June 2012 in Pakistan, in the prime slot of 8:00 pm every Friday on Hum TV; the final episode aired on 2 November 2012, and garnered much praise. The final episode of the serial left an unforgettable effect on audience, despite the usual revenge ending. Shehr-e-Zaat received widespread critical acclaim and is widely regarded as one of the greatest Pakistani television series of all time. Despite its focus on spirituality and aversion to romance, the serial was a major hit and emerged as a ratings success.

The serial won three Hum Awards at its first ceremony, including Best Drama Serial, and was nominated for seven categories. The serial was nominated for the Lux Style Awards in 2013 but did not win. Mohib Mirza was nominated for best supporting actor at the Pakistan Media Awards in 2013. Due to widespread acclaim and owing to its popularity, a special transmission was held in Karachi and broadcast on Hum TV at the conclusion of the drama.

== Plot ==
Shehr-e-zaat revolves around a beautiful daydreamer Falak Sher, an only child to wealthy parents. Falak is a student of fine arts who makes the sculpture of the man of her dreams and falls head over heels in love when she finds the breathing manifestation of it in Salman Ansar. But the more Falak tries to get close to Salman, the more he ignores her. Hamza, Falak's close friend, adores her dearly. Falak had been oblivious to his love for her for a long time. Falak has always been the centre of attention and has never been deprived of anything.

Falak's mother, Mehr-un-Nisa, built her subsistence according to worldly life. Falak and Salman get married, and during the initial days, Salman proves to be a good husband despite his father-in-law, Sher Afgan's, reservations. Falak's happiness is short-lived as Salman falls in love with an uneducated and crass employee Tabinda, at his factory, with whom he begins an extramarital relationship. Falak decides to meet Tabinda and confront her but is shocked by Tabinda's unattractive physical appearance and eventually suffers from a major nervous breakdown. She comes back to consciousness with a broken heart and, for the first time in her life, looks at her tragedy from a different perspective.

Instead of craving for Salman's lost love, she ponders over the power of destiny. The fact that Salman prefers Tabinda, an ugly-looking woman with a loose character, over her forces her to go through a journey of self-discovery. She comes across the bitter realities and learns the true purpose of life while getting lessons from her grandmother. Falak adapts to simplicity, patience and humbleness. She brings quietness to her life and gets rid of unnecessary worldly pursuits. She accepts Salman back into her life after Tabinda leaves him without her previous obsession.

== Cast ==
- Mahira Khan as Falak Sher Afghan/Fifi
- Mohib Mirza as Hamza Malik
- Mikaal Zulfiqar as Salman Ansar
- Samina Peerzada as Falak's Nani (grandmother)
- Mansha Pasha as Rashna
- Sohail Hashmi as Sheir Afghan
- Sana Javed as Arifa
- Tariq Niazi as Jameel
- Hina Khawaja Bayat as Mehr-un-Nisa Afghan
- Seemi Pasha as Nusrat Ansar, Salman's mother
- Rifat Humera Channa as Hadiqa

Guest appearances

- Nadia Afghan as Tabinda
- Munawar Saeed as Baba

== Original soundtrack ==
The theme song of Shehr-e-Zaat is taken from the 2000s enormous hit album Raqs-e-Bismil also known as Dance of Wounded of Sufi singer Abida Parveen, written or poetry by 18th centuries most famous Sufi poet, Shah Niaz and originally composed by Muzaffar Ali for Parveen's album. Director Sultan Khoosat requested Abida Parveen to give the song for the show, as the song was perfectly fitted for the serial with its spiritualism, cliché storyline and manner. Despite its original release of almost above decade, Serial OST goes hit once again and highly appreciated by listeners of this song selection for Shehr-e-Zaat genre style serial. Abida's song Zahid ne Mera was also used when Falak finds out the relationship between Tabinda and Salman.

=== Track listing ===
No.	Title	Lyrics	Music	Performer(s)	Length
1.	"Yaar Ko Humne Jabaja Dekha"	Muzaffar Ali	Muzaffar Ali	Abida Parveen
2.	"Zahid Ne Mera Hasil-e-Iman Nahi Dekha"	Asghar Gondhvi	Muzaffar Ali	Abida Parveen

== Difference from the novel ==
Prior to adaptation Shehr-e-Zaat was a story of comprises no more than 70 to 88 pages and was published in Ahmad's book Meri Zaat Zara-e-Benishan along with two more stories in first edition. Moreover, it was also published in Umeras another book Main Ne Khwabon Ka Shajar Dekha Hai with five other stories, but as for 2010s editions of Umera's work, all adapted work is printed separately. To give the strength to story, Umera added two new characters Hamza (portrayed by Mohib Mirza) and Nani (portrayed by Samina Peerzada). Changes into story were positively accepted, although the script for Drama serial settled with different opening and ended with not a same but similar ending. Umera mentions the story plot set in Lahore and Karachi, but more than 85% of shoot was completed only in Karachi.

== Broadcast and availability ==
Zindagi Channel began broadcasting this series in India starting 13 August 2015.

== Reception ==
=== Critical reception ===
Shehr-e-Zaat received a rating of 7.9 trp, owing to its popularity, a special transmission was held in Karachi and broadcast on Hum TV at the conclusion of the drama. Shehr-e-Zaat was ranked No. 4. Due to story Sufism and Islamization touch it draws orthodox reviews commented that Shehr-e-Zaat and its misplaced knowledge of Islam. It is the third highest-rated Pakistani television series. In a blog on The Tribune, a writer wrote about "misplaced knowledge of Islam" due to the way the story presented Sufism and Islamization. Dawn declared the series as one of the highlights of 2012. It received universal acclaim all around the world. Indian TV channel Star Plus wanted to telecast it in India but Hum TV refused it. Mahira Khan was praised for her acting many called her the heart of show, also saying that she outclassed her co-actors with her acting. Shehr-e-zaat was named the best drama serial by CNN. Shehr e Zaat won best drama serial at Hum Awards 2013. The show rose Mahira Khan to a limelight once again after Humsafar and Yash Chopra also said in an interview that after seeing the serial he decided to launch Mahira Khan. She also won Best Actress award. Many called her the new face of Pakistani Cinema.

=== Controversies ===
Shehr-e-Zaat was the most talked about show when it went on air, people talked about everything from the inspirational message it contained to whether Falak should or should not be wearing a dupatta. Shehr-e-Zaat is still the most talked about drama, not because people are still impressed by it but because of the rift it caused between the writer Umera Ahmed, the channel on which it was being aired and the director Sarmad Khoosat. Umera wrote the script of serial for only 16 episodes but it went on to 19 episodes due to positively received reception. Hum TV apologizes for doing that because the last three episodes were unnecessarily stretched. The final episodes lost the charm of the serial. In the final episode of serial, the director wrote an ending monologue; "cheezain behaya nahi hoti, jo kuch un se mansoob kya jata hay woh behaya hota hai..." which was actually neither the part of Novel nor the script and was written against the will of writer.

== Awards and nominations ==
Ceremony	Won	Nominated	Ref
1st Hum Awards	Momina Duraid, Asad Qureshi and Abdullah Kadwani – Best Drama Serial; Mahira Khan – Best Actress; Mohib Mirza – Best Supporting Actor	Sarmad Sultan Khoosat – Best Director; Mikaal Zulfiqar – Best Actor; Umera Ahmad – Best Writer Drama Serial; Mikaal Zulfiqar and Mahira Khan – Best on screen couple	
4th Pakistan Media Awards	Mahira Khan – Best Actress; Mohib Mirza – Best Supporting Actor		
12th Lux Style Awards		Momina Duraid, Asad Qureshi and Abdullah Kadwani – Best Drama Serial; Abida Parveen – Best Original Sound Track	

== See also ==
- List of Pakistani actresses
- List of Pakistani actors
- List of Pakistani television serials
