= Juda Huay Kuch Is Tarha =

Pakistani television series

- Written by: Khalil Rehman
- Directed by: Wehab Jafri
- Starring: Dur-e-Fishan Saleem; Nabeel Zuberi; Hasan Khan
- Music by: SK Salman Khan
- Country of origin: Pakistan
- Original language: Urdu
- No. of episodes: 35

Production
- Producer: Momina Duraid
- Production company: MD Productions

Original release
- Network: Hum TV
- Release: 23 August – 8 October 2021

Juda Huay Kuch Is Tarah (Urdu: (جدا ہوۓ کچھ اسطرح, lit. 'Such was Our Parting') is a Pakistani drama serial produced by Momina Duraid under banner of MD Productions. It features Dur-e-Fishan Saleem, Nabeel Zuberi and Hasan Khan in lead roles. It aired weekdays (Monday – Friday) on Hum TV at 9pm from 23 August 2021 to 8 October 2021 and completed 31 episodes within two and a half months and was replaced by Duraid's another production, Sila-e-Mohabbat.

The serial received backlash for portraying the marriage of foster siblings (not siblings in accordance with plotline) as it is unlawful in Islam.

== Plot ==
Before her death, Maha's mother wants to meet Asad, her sister's son whom she had brought up. Maha's father tries to contact Najeeb (Asad's father), and explains him the situation of Maha's mother who is on deathbed. Asad along with his father reaches Karachi and visit his Aunt. Najeeb thinks that Khadija has done soany favours on him by bringing up of Asad, thus he decides to return her favours and convinces Asad to merry Maha. Consequently, their Nikkah happens......

== Cast ==
- Dur-e-Fishan Saleem Maha
- Nabeel Zuberi as Asad
- Sabeena Syed as Zara
- Hasan Khan as Faizan
- Shabbir Jan as Tariq
- Fareeda Shabbir as Erum
- Kashif Mehmood as Najeeb
- Sohail Sameer as Javed
- Salma Hassan as Khadija
- Saima Qureshi as Maria
- Aimen Shehzadi as Samar
- Salma Qadir as Sughra
