= Pyar Ke Sadqay =

Pakistani romantic comedy television series

- پیار کے صدقے
- Genre: Comedy; Romance; Drama
- Written by: Zanjabeel Asim Shah
- Directed by: Farooq Rind
- Starring: Yumna Zaidi; Bilal Abbas
- Country of origin: Pakistan
- Original language: Urdu
- No. of seasons: 1
- No. of episodes: 30

Production
- Executive producers: Moomal Shunaid; Momina Duraid
- Running time: approx. 36–40 minutes
- Production companies: MD Productions; Moomal Entertainment

Original release
- Network: Hum TV
- Release: 23 January – 13 August 2020

Pyar Ke Sadqay (Urdu: پیار کے صدقے, lit. 'For the sake of love') is a 2020 Pakistani drama television series that premiered on Hum TV on 23 January 2020. It is directed by Farooq Rind, written by Zanjabeel Asim Shah and produced by Momina Duraid under MD Productions. It has Bilal Abbas and Yumna Zaidi in leads and Yashma Gill, Omair Rana and Atiqa Odho in supporting roles.

The series received critical acclaim due to Rind's direction and performance of the actors, especially Khan and Zaidi. It won the most awards at the 20th Lux Style Awards, including Best Actor Critics for Khan and Best Actress Critics and Best Actress Popular both for Zaidi.

On YouTube, the drama performed exceptionally well and proved to be a major milestone for Yumna Zaidi and Bilal Abbas Khan. The drama achieved highest TRP of 5.3.

== Plot ==
"Pyar Ke Sadqay" is the story of Abdullah and Mahjabeen, who are social misfits. Mahjabeen's character is that of an ingénue. She is a naïve, quirky, clumsy, carefree, talkative, and mischievous young woman who has failed the tenth-grade multiple times. She is very innocent and fails to pick up on specific social cues. Presumably, she has a lower-middle-class family background. Abdullah is a shy, nerdy, soft-spoken, and socially awkward, out-of-place university student gifted in mathematics. He comes from an affluent upbringing and has been psychologically abused by his stepfather, Sarwar. Both protagonists are daydreamers with different aspirations; Mahjabeen fantasizes about escaping from her studies and getting married, while Abdullah dreams about a relationship with his crush and classmate, Shanzey.

Mahjabeen and Abdullah know each other through her father, Munshi Jee, who works for Abdullah's family and business. Mahjabeen teases Abdullah occasionally, and they are acquaintances at the beginning of the series. Early in the series, Sarwar becomes smitten with Mahjabeen and plots to pursue her romantically. However, his desire to marry Mahjabeen is rejected by Munshi Jee as she is too innocent and young to marry someone as cunning and old as Sarwar. After both protagonists are rejected by their interests (with Mahjabeen's fiancé eloping with her best friend on her wedding day and Abdullah's crush rejecting his proposal), Abdullah marries Mahjabeen out of pity. This angers Sarwar, and he secretly plots to ruin the gullible Abdullah's relationship with the ever-so-innocent Mahjabeen. He continuously insults Mahjabeen and tells Abdullah that she is unworthy of him. Although he listens to and believes his stepfather in the beginning, but then begins to like the small things that make her a "middle class" wife.

Shanzey, Abdullah's crush, marries the man she wanted to marry, a wealthy and high-class businessman. However, she finds him stubborn and selfish. She leaves him as soon as she realises he is not the man she wants to spend the rest of her life with. At first, her father is hesitant to let her come home and stay; however, once he sees her new husband abuse his daughter, he expels him and supports his daughter as she divorces him. Eventually, Shanzey realises she wants to marry someone like Abdullah, so she begins to pursue him with the guidance and support of Sarwar, who wants Mahjabeen for himself.

The plot twists, and Sarwar tries to assault Mahjabeen. Mahjabeen tells Abdullah about Sarwar, who says his father could never do such a thing. He sends her back home on account of his father's insult. Munshi Jee is arrested on the order of Sarwar, has a heart attack and dies after asking Vashma, Abdullah's younger sister, to take care of Mahjabeen as she is very innocent. Unlike her brother Abdullah, Vashma is a confident girl as she grew up with her aunt, Lalarukh, instead of lurking with Sarwar. Abdullah proceeds to get engaged to Shanzey after she attempts suicide. As he talks to his fiancé about their future, he realises she will be a very different wife compared to Mahjabeen. Shanzey says she will not do any of the "middle class" wife things Mahjabeen used to do for him, which leaves Abdullah missing his wife. Shanzey and Sarwar pressurize Abdullah to divorce Mahjabeen; however, his sister and aunt tell him not to. Abdullah's mother, Mansura, is adamant that her husband loves her and refuses to believe Vashma when she tells her what he did to Mahjabeen. However, she eventually becomes suspicious of him, so she tells Abdullah not to divorce his wife. Sarwar threatens Mahjabeen and her mother, but she cuts the call on his end. Vashma takes Mahjabeen to the hospital, where she is revealed to be pregnant. Vashma explains to her mom that Munshi Jee was innocent and was tied to a plan plotted by Sarwar. Mansura then tells her son to take over their company. She leaves Sarwar. Abdullah realises Mahjabeen is his true love and ends his engagement with Shanzey.

The serial ends with Abdullah bringing Mahjabeen back home, Sarwar ends up in jail, and the last scene is of Mahjabeen and Abdullah quarrelling.

== Cast ==
- Bilal Abbas as Abdullah Shahbaz: Mahjabeen's husband, Shahbaz and Mansura's son & Washma's brother
- Yumna Zaidi as Mahjabeen Rizwan: Rizwan and Seema's daughter & Abdullah's wife
- Omair Rana as Sarwar: Mansura's second husband & Abdullah and Washma's stepfather who is abusive towards Abdullah and plots to pursue Mahjabeen
- Atiqa Odho as Mansura Sarwar: Washma and Abdullah's mother & Sarwar's wife
- Yashma Gill as Shanzey Meer: Abdullah's classmate and crush at the beginning of the series
- Malik Raza as Rizwan Munshi: Mahjabeen's father, works for Abdullah's family/family business
- Salma Hassan as Seema Rizwan: Mahjabeen's mother, Rizwan's wife.
- Gul-e-Rana as Sarwar's mother
- Shermeen Ali as Lalarukh "Pho," Abdullah and Washma's Phupho (paternal aunt)
- Srha Asghar as Washma Shahbaz: Shahbaz and Mansura's daughter & Abdullah's younger sister.
- Khalid Anam as Meer: Shanzey's father
- Khalid Malik as "Dr." Hammad: briefly engaged to Mahjabeen and impersonates a doctor
- Ahsan Mohsin Akram as Ehsaan: Washma's classmate and lover

== Soundtrack ==
Pyar Ke Sadqay

Soundtrack album by Ahmed Jehanzaib
- Released: 17 January 2020
- Recorded: 2020
- Genre: Television soundtrack
- Length: 3:07
- Language: Urdu
- Label: Hum TV

Music video
- "OST: Pyar Ke Sadqay" on YouTube

Pyar Ke Sadqay's OST (titled after the series) was composed and performed by Pakistani singer Ahmed Jahanzaib. Mahnoor Khan also provided vocals for the song. The OST has drawn heavy comparisons to the popular Sindhi song, Rahat Milay Thi Dard Mein, Man Piyar Tan Sadqay, in terms of its lyrics, melody, harmonies, and overall composition. The song "Rahat Milay Thi Dard Mein" was originally performed by the Pakistani Sindhi folk/playback singer, Ustad Muhammad Yousuf for the 1968 Pakistani Sindhi-language film, Shehro Feroz.

== Reception ==
=== Critical reception ===
Pyar Ke Sadqay, created critical hype before its premier and received rave reviews throughout its broadcast due to its characters and Rind's direction. Khan's performance as Abdullah was highly praised. Zaidi's performance as Mahjabeen was reviewed favourably. A reviewer from DAWN Images praised the Rind's direction, acting performances of Zaidi, Khan, Rana and Odho, but criticized the narrative for prioritizing middle-class values over meaningful themes.

=== Awards and nominations ===
Date of ceremony	Award	Category	Recipient(s) and nominee(s)	Result	Ref
October 9, 2021	Lux Style Awards	Best TV Serial	Momina Duraid & Moomal Shunaid	Nominated	
October 9, 2021	Lux Style Awards	Best Television Director	Farooq Rind	Won	
October 9, 2021	Lux Style Awards	Best Television Writer	Zanjabeel Asim Shah	Nominated	
October 9, 2021	Lux Style Awards	Best Female Actor - Critics	Yumna Zaidi	Won	
October 9, 2021	Lux Style Awards	Best Female Actor - Viewer's choice	Yumna Zaidi	Won	
October 9, 2021	Lux Style Awards	Best Male Actor - Critics	Bilal Abbas Khan	Won	
October 9, 2021	Lux Style Awards	Best Male Actor - Viewer's choice	Bilal Abbas Khan	Nominated	
October 9, 2021	Lux Style Awards	Best Ost	Pyar Ke Sadqay - Ahmed Jahanzeb, Alia Khan & Mahnoor Khan	Nominated	
November 5, 2021	2nd Pakistan International Screen Awards	Best TV Serial	Momina Duraid & Moomal Shunaid	Won	
November 5, 2021	2nd Pakistan International Screen Awards	Best Television Director	Farooq Rind	Won	
November 5, 2021	2nd Pakistan International Screen Awards	Best Television Actor (Popular)	Bilal Abbas Khan	Nominated	
November 5, 2021	2nd Pakistan International Screen Awards	Best Television Actress (Popular)	Yumna Zaidi	Nominated	
November 5, 2021	2nd Pakistan International Screen Awards	Best Supporting Actor	Omair Rana	Nominated	
November 5, 2021	2nd Pakistan International Screen Awards	Best Supporting Actress	Atiqa Odho	Nominated	
November 5, 2021	2nd Pakistan International Screen Awards	Best Writer	Zanjabeel Asim Shah	Won	
