= Ishq Murshid =

2023–24 Pakistani television series

- Title Card
- Urdu: عشق مرشد
- Genre: Romantic; Drama; Social
- Developed by: Momina Duraid
- Written by: Abdul Khaliq Khan
- Directed by: Farooq Rind
- Creative director: Momina Duraid
- Starring: Bilal Abbas Khan; Durefishan Saleem; (entire cast)
- Opening theme: "Ishq Murshid Mera" by Ahmed Jahanzeb
- Ending theme: "Ishq Murshid mera" by Ahmed Jahanzeb
- Composer: Ahmed Jahanzeb
- Country of origin: Pakistan
- Original language: Urdu
- No. of seasons: 1

Production
- Executive producer: Moomal Shunaid
- Producer: Momina Duraid
- Production locations: Karachi, Sindh, Pakistan
- Camera setup: Multiple-camera setup 1080p
- Production companies: Moomal Entertainment; MD Productions

Original release
- Network: Hum TV
- Release: 8 October 2023 – 5 May 2024

Ishq Murshid (transl. Love Guide) is a romantic, light-hearted Pakistani television series directed by Farooq Rind and produced by Moomal Entertainment and MD Productions. It aired from October 8, 2023, to May 5, 2024, on Hum TV and starred Bilal Abbas Khan and Durefishan Saleem in the lead roles. The final episode of the series released theatrically on 3 May 2024, and broadcast on 5 May 2024.

The series received mixed reviews from critics for its plot and characters, but despite this, it achieved a high TRP rating of 22.3 based on 15-35 female audience formula of Hum TV. While as per Kantar Media and Medialogic, the highest TRP ratings based on real formula is 18.5 TRP.

== Plot ==
Shibra Suleman is a headstrong, intelligent, and selfless girl, unwavering in her principles and deeply cherishing her family values. Hailing from a modest middle-class background, she remains unswayed by material wealth or social status. Shahmeer Sikandar emerges as an enigmatic, yielding figure of affluence, having pursued his education abroad in the UK. He is from a wealthy family; however, his mother died in his childhood, leaving him with that everlasting scar, and he is in conflict with his father, Dawood. His mother, Zubaida, was supposedly sick in her last remaining moments and had a caretaker hired for her, Farah. Her husband and the caretaker had an affair, and the day Zubaida found this out, she died. The caretaker then married Shahmeer's father, and Shahmeer refused to let go of him. When attending his best friend, Faraz's wedding, he meets Shibra, demanding her change from a driver. Enthralled by her confidence and alluring personality, Shahmeer finds himself drawn to her in an instant. Shibra is also there, attending her best friend Maliha's wedding. On the wedding night of Faraz and Maliha, Shahmeer crashes into their room and, in a comedic sequence, implores them to know more about Shibra through Maliha. This begins the ultimate plan between the three to get Shibra to marry Shahmeer, despite Maliha knowing Shibra's loathing for opulence and corruption. She insists on only marrying whoever her father chooses. Meanwhile, Shibra's sister (Sukaina) is upset as she has been married to her cousin, Zohaib, for 3 years now, but because of his family's greedy demands, his mother refuses to take her in as his wife. Shahmeer embarks on a perfect scheme to capture Shibra's heart, which involves disguising himself as a poor man and starting anew. This means securing employment at Shibra's father's office, transforming into the puzzled and sweet Fazal Bakhsh. Fazal Bakhsh, in the guise of acquainting himself with Shibra and her family members, bribes the boy who delivers lunch to Shibra's father, replaces him and starts collecting lunch from Shibra's home and delivering it to her father every day. One day, Shibra's mother collapses in severe pain when Fazal is there to fetch lunch. Fazal calls an ambulance and refers Shibra's mother to the hospital, where doctors examine her and say that she needs an appendix surgery. After successful operation, Shibra's father asks both his daughters to sell their jewelry to settle the hospital bill. But the receptionist tells them that the bill of eight hundred thousand rupees has been settled by an angel. Shibra's father gets shocked and calls Sukaina to tell her that there is no need to bring her jewelry since the hospital bill has been paid by an unknown angel. Although Shibra is initially not interested in Fazal Baksh, for some reason she calls him 'Fazal Baksh' and not 'Brother Fazal' like Sukaina.

== Cast ==
- Bilal Abbas Khan as Shahmir Sikandar / Fazal Bakhsh (Fake identity) – Dawood & Zubaida's son; Shibra's husband.
- Durefishan Saleem as Shibra Suleman – Suleman & Safia's daughter; Sukaina's sister; Shahmeer's wife.
- Omair Rana as Dawood Ali Khan – Shahmeer's father; Zubaida's widower; Farah's husband.
- Zarmeena Ikram as Farah Ali Khan – Dawood's second wife; Shahmeer's step-mother.
- Samiya Mumtaz as Zubaida Sikandar – Dawood's first wife; Shahmeer's mother (deceased).
- Noor ul Hassan as Suleman Ahmad – Safia's husband; Shibra & Sukaina's father.
- Salma Hassan as Safia Suleman – Suleman's wife; Shibra & Sukaina's mother.
- Hafsa Ehsan Abbasi as Sukaina Suleman; Suleman & Safia's daughter; Shibra's sister; Zohaib's wife.
- Sajjad Paul as Zohaib – Nargis's son; Sukaina's husband.
- Rabia Noreen as Nargis – Suleman's sister; Zohaib's Mother.
- Awais Sulaman as Faraz Aftab – Shahmeer's best friend; Maliha's Husband.
- Srha Asghar as Maleeha Faraz – Shibra's best friend; Faraz's wife.
- Shabbir Jan as Aftab – Faraz's father, Shahmeer’s rival.
- Hira Tareen as Mehreen Baig – Haroon's daughter; Shahmeer's childhood friend and one-sided lover.
- Adnan Jaffar as Haroon Baig – Mehreen's father.
- Sajid Shah as Safdar – Shahmeer's confidant & guard.
- Ali Gul Mallah as Fazal Bakhsh.

== Music ==
The original soundtrack "Ishq Murshid" released in November 2023. Lyrics were written by Sabir Zafar, Ahmed Jahanzeb composed the music and performed the song. Another original soundtrack "Tera Mera Hai Pyar Amar" was also released in November 2023. Ahmed Zahahzeb penned the lyrics, composed the music, and performed the song. The female version and extended wedding verse of "Tera Mera Hai Pyar Amar" were also released. Javeria Saud alleged that she penned the lyrics to the song, but was not credited, but Jahanzeb disputed her claims.

== Production ==
To portray the main protagonist, Ahad Raza Mir, Hamza Ali Abbasi, Wahaj Ali, and Bilal Abbas Khan were approached, but Khan was ultimately chosen. On 10 March 2023, Khan revealed his upcoming project through his Instagram account, in which he will be paired opposite Dur-e-Fishan Saleem. Saleem was chosen to portray the female lead and was suggested to the writer Abdul Khaliq Khan by Siraj-ul-Haque. Hum TV revealed the look of the actors on 7 June. The first looks of the lead actors from the series were revealed on 23 May. The first and second teasers were released on 5 August 2023.

== Reception ==
=== Critical reception ===
DAWN Images noted, along with the characters of some other television productions, the character of the male protagonist for being in love and the female protagonist's character for being outspoken. In an article by Redbrick, The reviewer praised Bilal's transition between two characters and called it as "effortless".

=== Ratings ===
In its 18th episode which aired in February 2024, the series received the rating of 22.3 TRP, the highest for the network and third highest for the entire PTV. The first episode for the series gained more than 92 million views on YouTube.
