= Pakistan Awaam Raaj Tehreek =

Political party in Pakistan

Pakistan Awaam Raaj Tehreek پاکستان عوام راج تحریک Pakistan People’s Rule Movement
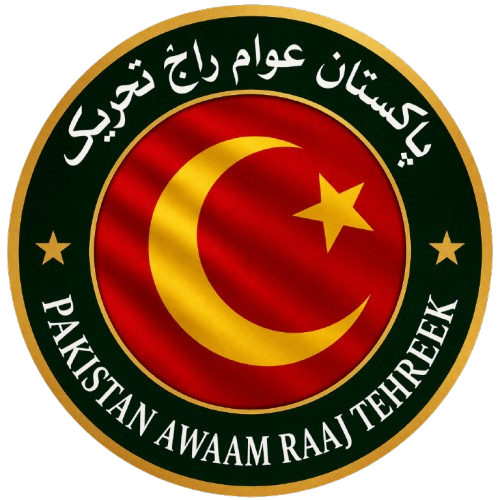
- Abbreviation: PART
- Leader: Iqrar Ul Hassan
- Founder: Iqrar Ul Hassan
- Founded: January 15, 2026; 9 months ago
- Headquarters: Lahore, Punjab
- Colors
- Slogan: People’s sovereignty, national integrity

Party flag
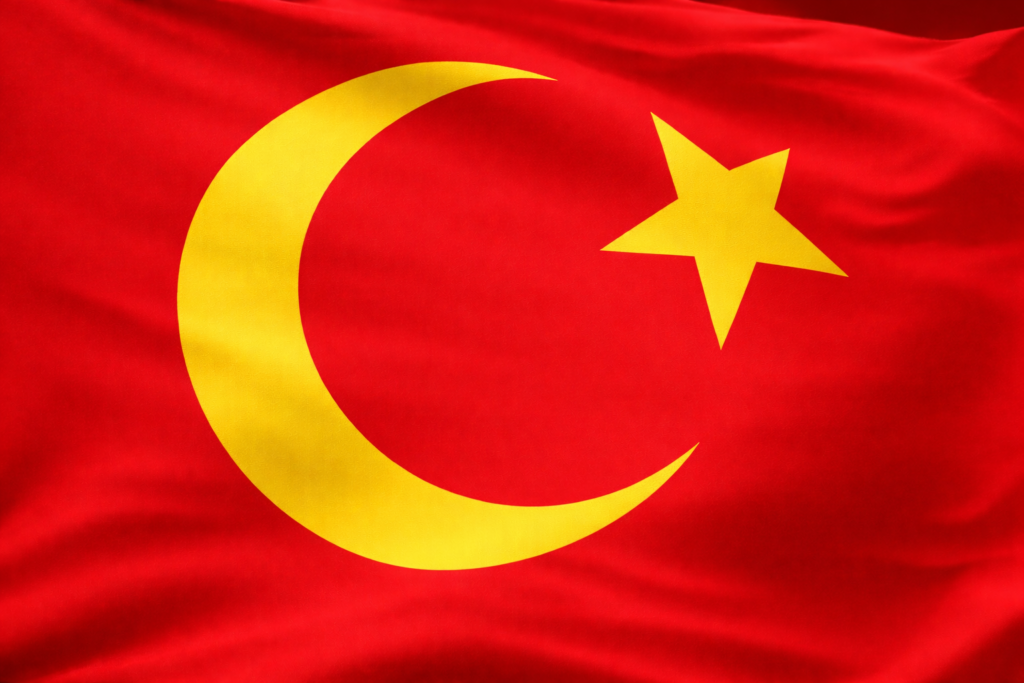

Website
- awaamraaj.pk; awaamraajtehreek.com

The Pakistan Awaam Raaj Tehreek (abbr. (PART) Urdu: پاکستان عوام راج تحریک, lit. 'Pakistan People’s Rule Movement') is a Pakistani political party established in 2026 by television presenter and politician Iqrar Ul Hassan.

== History ==
Pakistan Awaam Raaj Tehreek was launched in January 2026 as a political movement in Pakistan aimed at increasing public participation in governance and strengthening democracy. The movement was established in response to concerns regarding accountability, governance, and social issues in the country. It was formally announced by its founder, Iqrar Ul Hassan, in Karachi, where he presented its objective of empowering citizens and promoting transparency in political processes. Since its establishment, the movement has positioned itself as a platform for civic engagement and reform, gaining attention through social media and among segments of the public interested in alternative political initiatives.

== See also ==
- List of Islamic political parties
- List of student federations in Pakistan
