= Yeh Mera Deewanapan Hai =

Pakistani television series

- Genre: Romance
- Written by: Zanjabeel Asim Shah
- Directed by: Shehzad Rafique
- Opening theme: Ali Sethi
- Country of origin: Pakistan
- Original language: Urdu
- No. of episodes: 48

Production
- Producer: Sadia Jabbar
- Production company: Sadia Jabbar Productions

Original release
- Network: A-Plus TV
- Release: 15 August 2015 – 30 January 2016

Yeh Mera Deewanapan Hai is a 2015 Pakistani television series aired on A-Plus TV, written by Zanjabeel Asim Shah and produced by Sadia Jabbar. It stars Saima Noor and Junaid Khan in lead roles. The series is set in Karachi and spans over 30 years, starts from 1990s to present day. It revolves around Jehangir who falls for Mehtab, a nurse at his father's clinic who is older than him.

== Synopsis ==
Since his childhood, Jehangir is attracted to Mehtaab, a divorced nurse who works in his father's clinic. With the passage of time, his feelings develops deeper and he falls for her due to her beauty. His father also has an affair with another woman because he considers Jehangir's mother to be unattractive. The plot revolves around the love story of Jehangir and the troubles faced by his family.

== Cast ==
- Saima Noor as Mehtab
- Junaid Khan as Jehangir, Nafeesuddin and Attiya's only son
- Javed Sheikh as Dr. Nafeesuddin, Jehangir's father
- Irsa Ghazal as Attiya, Jehangir's mother
- Saima Qureshi as Rakshanda, Mina and Zeba's mother
- Rashid Farooqui as Siddiqui
- Jinaan Hussain as Zeba, Rakshanda's elder daughter
- Anoushey Abbasi as Mina, Rakshanda's younger daughter
- Tabbasum Arif as Nighat, Nafeesuddin's cousin
- Anita Camphor as Tabinda, Nafeesuddin's elder sister
