= Dil Ruba =

Pakistani television series by Momina Duraid

- Official title card
- Genre: Comedy; Psychological drama Social issue
- Written by: Qaisra Hayat
- Directed by: Ali Hasan
- Starring: Hania Aamir; Mohib Mirza; Nabeel Zuberi; Shehroz Sabzwari; Syed Jibran; Asad Siddiqui; Raeed Muhammad Alam; Durefishan Saleem
- Theme music composer: Shani Arshad
- Country of origin: Pakistan
- Original language: Urdu
- No. of seasons: 1
- No. of episodes: 24

Production
- Executive producer: Momina Duraid
- Producer: Momina Duraid
- Cinematography: Abrar Kashmiri
- Editor: Faizan Ghori
- Running time: approx. 38-40 minutes
- Production company: MD Productions

Original release
- Network: Hum TV
- Release: 28 March – 19 September 2020

Related
- Deewar-e-Shab; Dulhan

Dil Ruba (Urdu: دِلرُبا, lit. 'Enchanting') is a 2020 Pakistani television series premiered on 28 March 2020 on Hum TV. It is directed by Ali Hasan, written by Qaisra Hayat and produced by Momina Duraid under MD Productions. The serial stars Hania Aamir as an Internet celebrity, who is popular on a video-sharing social platform. It also stars Shehroz Sabzwari, Syed Jibran, Mohib Mirza, Asad Siddiqui, Ghana Ali, Laila Wasti and Marina Khan in supporting roles.

== Plot ==
The protagonist - Sanam (Hania Aamir), is a normal teenager with all normal social media stuff. She is a TikToker and her beauty enchants all the men she meets. Every man she speaks to on her phone is dancing to her tune which she uses as a means for getting benefits.

== Cast ==
- Hania Aamir as Sanam
- Khalifa Sajeeruddin as Jameel : Sanam's father
- Marina Khan as Ghazala : Sanam's mother
- Durefishan Saleem as Erum : Sanam's elder sister
- Saad Azhar as Arsalan : Sanam's elder brother
- Beenish Raja as Sehrish : Arsalan's wife; Junaid's first cousin and ex-fiancee
- Mirza Rizwan as Asad : Sanam's brother figure and neighbour
- Asad Siddiqui as Ayaz : Photographer and photo studio owner; Asad's friend
- Shehroz Sabzwari as Junaid : only son of the cloth seller merchant; Sehrish's first cousin and ex fiancee
- Khalid Anam as Junaid's father
- Huma Nawab as Junaid's mother
- Laila Wasti as Samiya : Sanam and Erum's aunt; Sabih and Razi's mother
- Mohib Mirza as Sabih Ul Hassan : step son of Samiya (elder son)
- Nabeel Zuberi as Razi Ul Hassan : (younger) son of Samiya; Sanam's first husband (dead)
- Amber Khan as Shagufta : Zoya's mother
- Hafsa Butt as Zoya : Razi's fiancee
- Shehryar Zaidi as Daniyal : Khurram's father
- Syed Jibran as Khurram Shahzad : Sanam's second husband
- Ghana Ali as Natasha : Khurram's love interest
- Raeed Muhammad Alam as Farhaad : Natasha's love interest
- Zain Afzal
- Rehana Akhter

== Reception ==
The first episode of the serial garnered 7.8 TRP and 7 million views on YouTube. Aamir's portrayal of Sanam was praised by critics. It was also praised for its topic and for its accurate portrayal of life of teenage girls in 21st century. Oyeah.pk gave it 3.9 out of 5 stars.

=== Awards and nominations ===
Year	Awards	Category	Recipient	Result	Ref.
2021	Lux Style Awards	Best Emerging Talent in TV	Dur-e-Fishan Saleem	Nominated	
