= Shehr-e-Zaat (novella) =

- Short story by Umera Ahmad
- Country: Pakistan
- Language: Urdu
- Genre: Novella

Publication
- Published in: Shuaa Digest
- Publication type: Periodical; Book
- Media type: Print
- Series: Main Ne Khawabon Ka Shajar Dekha Hai

Shehr-e-Zaat (Urdu: شہرذات ; lit: City of Self ) is a 2002 novella by Pakistani fiction writer Umera Ahmad. A blog at the Express Tribune describes the story as a fictional story with an elements of spiritualism and philosophy. The story depicts the obsession of individuals with worldly life, forgetting their creator—a journey from self to subsistence.

== Plot ==
The story revolves around an arrogant, class conscious and narcissistic Falak Sher Afgan an only child to very rich parents. She fell in love with Salman after seeing him in her friends wedding ceremony, Falak tries every way to get in touch with Salman. She faked her presence as a coincidence at shopping mall while following him, and then she started meeting him. Salman couldn't resist her beauty and affection which makes him in love with her from head over heels too. Belonging to the elite class she has always been the center of attention and never been deprived of anything. She never came across through religious brightness and divinity. Falak's mother, Memoona built her subsistence according to the worldly life. Finally, Falak manages to marry Salman, and they live happily together, initially Salmans proves to be a good husband despite his father in law, Sher Afgan's reservations. Life was luxurious and full of joy but destiny decides doom for Falak when Salman falls in love with an uneducated an crass employee Tabinda at his factory with whom he begins an extramarital relationship. Falak decides to meet Tabinda and confront her. Upon seeing her unattractive physical appearance and crassness, she goes in a state of shock and eventually suffers from a major nervous breakdown. She comes back to consciousness with a broken heart and for the first time in life looks at her tragedy from a different perspective. Instead of craving for Salman’s lost love she ponders over the power of destiny. The fact that Salman preferred Tabinda, an ugly looking woman with a loose character over her, forces her to go through a journey of self-discovery. She comes across bitter realities and learns the true purpose of life while receiving Islamic perceptions through self to subsistence. Falak finally adapts simplicity, patience and humbleness, she brought quietness in her life and manages to get rid of unnecessary worldly and hollow pursuits. She eventually accepts Salman back in her life after Tabinda leaves him but without her previous obsession.

== Publication ==
Shehr-e-Zaat was first published in Shuaa Digest as a story in complete novel section, followed by other six stories unrelated to each other. All the stories were then compile in a form of book called Main Ne Khawabon Ka Shajar Dekha Hai (English: I have seen the Garden of Dreams). It was also published in one of early published edition of Ahmed book Meri Zaat Zarra-e-Benishan (English: My subsistence is like nothing but jot).

Other stories were Mein Ne Khabon Ka Shajar Dekha Hay, Koi Lamha Khaab Nahi Hota, Koi Baat Hay Teri Baat Me, Muthi Bhar Mitti and Teri Yaad Khar-e-Gulab Hay.

== Television adaptation ==
In 2012, a television adaption was made by Hum TV in collaboration with channels production house MD Productions with Abdullah Kadwani and Asad Qureshi of 7th Sky Entertainment. The drama serial stars Mahira Khan as Falak, Meekal Zulfiqar as Salman and Nadia Afghan as Tabinda. While for the serial two more characters were written by Umera, Hamza (played by Mohib Mirza) and Nani (played by Samina Peerzada).
