= Waseem Badami =

Pakistani television host

Waseem Badami TI
- وسیم بدامی
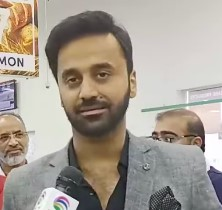
- Waseem Badami in 2022
- Born: 7 February 1968 (age 58); Karachi, Pakistan
- Occupations: News presenter, Television presenter
- Years active: 2006-present
- Employer: ARY News (2006-present)
- Children: 1

Waseem Badami (Note: Urdu: وسیم بدامی) is a Pakistani television host and news anchor who currently hosts the political talk show 11th Hour on ARY News.

== Career ==
Badami started his career by giving traffic updates on radio while he was studying at a university. After that he joined Business Plus channel as a researcher. In 2006, he was selected as an anchor person out of thousands of applicants at ARY News, where his career as a journalist started. He left the channel in October 2014 and subsequently joined BOL Network as an Executive Vice President and Senior Anchorperson. In April 2015, he resigned from BOL Network and rejoined ARY News. He is currently hosting the popular talk show "11th Hour" on ARY News He also hosts Shan-e-Ramazan on ARY Digital. He is famous for his “Masoomana Sawal” which has become his identity. He also hosts a cricket-related show Har Lamha Purjosh mainly during Pakistan Super League.

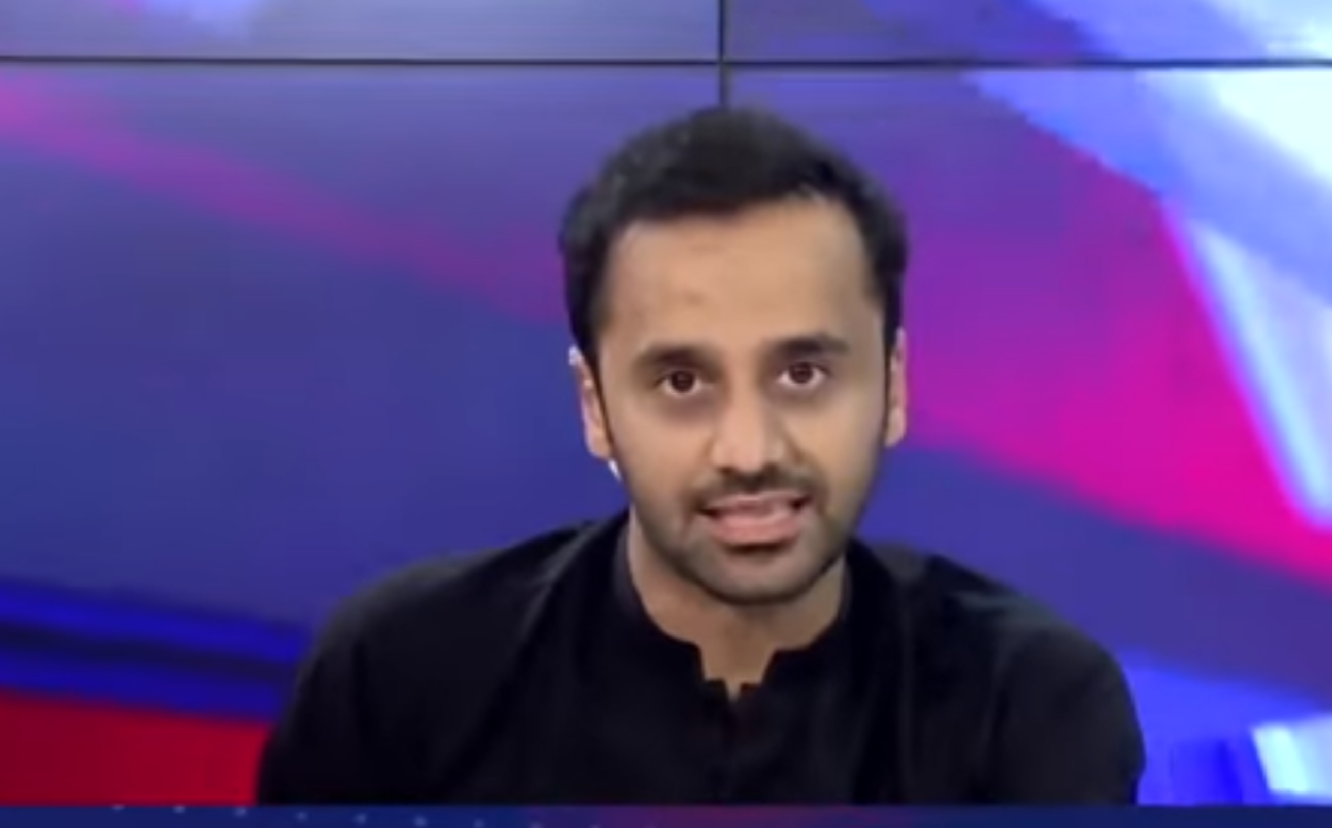
Badami in 2017

In 2017, Badami partnered up with Hemani Herbals and launched organic products and skin care brand named "WB" after his initials. The product was launched in Dubai followed by Karachi.

In 2022, Waseem started his podcast show on YouTube, "Podcast with Waseem Badami".

== Awards ==
Year	Award	Result	Note	Ref.
2025	Tamgha-e-Imtiaz	Won	Awarded by President of Pakistan	
