= Iqrar Ul Hassan =

Pakistani politician television presenter and journalist

- سید اقرار الحسن
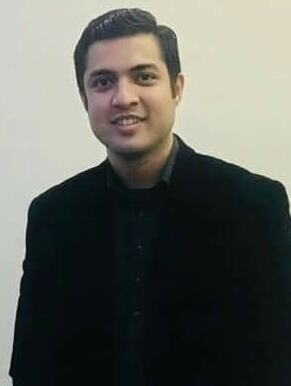
- Born: Syed Iqrar Ul Hassan; 29 June 1984 (age 42); Lahore, Punjab, Pakistan
- Education: G.C University, Lahore
- Occupations: Politician, investigative journalist, Television presenter
- Years active: 2006–present
- Employer: ARY News (2006–2026)
- Television: Sar e Aam (2012-2026)
- Political party: PART (2026–present)
- Spouses: Qurat-ul-Ain Iqrar (m. 2005) Farah Iqrar (m. 2012) Aroosa Khan (m. 2023)
- Children: 1

Syed Iqrar Ul Hassan (Urdu: سید اقرار الحسن; born 29 May 1984), known professionally as Iqrar Ul Hassan is a Pakistani politician, television presenter, and journalist. He was associated with ARY News, where he initially worked as a newscaster before later becoming widely recognized as the host of the program Sar e Aam. On 15 April 2026, he resigned from ARY News to focus on a political career.

== Incident ==
On April 29, 2016, Iqrar Ul Hassan and his Sar e Aam team were arrested on the orders of the Sindh Home Minister after exposing security lapses at the Provincial Assembly of Sindh by bringing an armed individual into the premises using media passes issued for an assembly session. He was granted bail the following day.

He has done sting operations in numerous factories and restaurants believed to be involved in adulteration as well as police stations linked to bribery, and corruption.

On February 14, 2024, Hassan and his Sar e Aam team visited the place of Peer Haq Khateeb in Kotli Sattian Tehsil to expose his activities. Hassan met him and had a debate with him. Later, on May 22, he was attacked in his car in Gujranwala by unknown followers of Khateeb.

=== Arrest ===
On 13 October 2026, Iqrar ul Hassan was arrested by the NCCIA over posts shared on his social media accounts. The agency said the posts included false and anti-state information. He was taken into custody and questioned for several days while the investigation continued. On 19 October 2026, a court sent him to judicial custody. Later, on 31 October 2026, he was granted bail and released from jail. The case remained under investigation after his release.

== Personal life ==
Iqrar ul Hassan first married journalist Qurat-ul-Ain in 2005. He later married TV journalist Farah Yousuf in 2012. In 2023, he married YouTuber and journalist Aroosa Khan. Pehlaaj Hassan, the son of Iqrar ul Hassan and Qurat-ul-Ain, is a child actor. He appeared in the television drama Alif, where he played the role of young Momin, the main character shown in childhood, alongside Hamza Ali Abbasi. His performance was well received by viewers and praised in the media for his acting at a young age. According to reports, he was also nominated for the Best Emerging Talent in TV category at the 20th Lux Style Awards.

== Career ==
=== Journalism career ===
Iqrar ul Hassan is a well-known Pakistani journalist and television host who became famous for his investigative program Sar-e-Aam, where he exposed corruption and social issues in society. He worked for ARY News for many years and was the main host of the show. However, on April 15, 2026 he left ARY News and stopped hosting Sar-e-Aam. He worked with the ARY News for about 21 years. After leaving the channel, he moved away from regular television journalism. Despite this, he is still widely recognized for his bold reporting style and his contribution to investigative journalism in Pakistan.

=== Political career ===
Hassan entered politics after a long journalism career. In 2026, after he ended his journalism career with ARY News he launched PART. A movement focused on representing ordinary people and addressing issues like corruption and justice in Pakistan. He now promotes his ideas through public events and social media, aiming to raise awareness and connect with young people. In January 2026, Iqrar launched his Centre PART political party. with Iqrar himself contesting 3 seats against the chiefs of the three major political parties in the country - Imran Khan of PTI, Shehbaz Sharif of PMLN, Bilawal Bhutto Zardari of PPP.

== See also ==
- Pakistan Awaam Raaj Tehreek
- List of Political Parties in Pakistan
