= Pir-e-Kamil =

2004 novel by Umera Ahmad

- Cover of English translation of novel
- Author: Umera Ahmad
- Translator: Umera Ahmad
- Language: English, Urdu
- Genre: Novel
- Publisher: Ferozsons
- Publication date: Urdu: 2004; English: 2011
- Publication place: Pakistan
- Media type: Urdu: Hardback; English: Paperback
- ISBN: 978-969-0-02341-4
- Dewey Decimal: 891.4393
- Followed by: Aab-e-Hayat

Pir-e-Kamil or Peer-e-Kamil (Urdu: پیر کامل; meaning "The Perfect Mentor") is a novel written by Pakistani writer Umera Ahmad. It was first published in Urdu in 2004 and in English in 2011. The book deals with the turning points in intervening lives of two people: a runaway girl named Imama Hashim; and a boy named Salar Sikander with an IQ of more than 150. The story spans a time period of around ten years. It is Ahmad's most popular work. It is followed by a sequel, Aab-e-Hayat.

== Plot summary ==
The story's protagonist, Imama Hashim, belongs to an influential Ahmadiyya Muslim family living in Islamabad. She decides to convert to Sunni Islam after being influenced by her friends. She attends her senior Shabiha's lectures in secrecy from her family and her roommates, Javeria and Rabia. While studying at a medical school in Lahore, she falls in love with her friend Zainab's elder brother, Dr. Jalal Ansar. But Imama's family tries to coerce her into marrying her first cousin Asjad, which is unacceptable to her. Her parents respond by grounding her and taking away her cellphone.

Imama seeks help from Salar whom she is antagonistic with since she is a religious girl and Salar is not. He is a rich, eccentric boy, obsessed with suicide and a sick question: "what is next to ecstasy?". He is also a genius with an IQ level above 150 and a photographic memory. Imama wishes to marry Jalal, but Salar lies to her that Jalal has married someone else. Imama is saddened and asks Salar to marry her so that her family will not be able to force her. Salar helps her but only for his own amusement in adventures and marries her, but soon after loses contact with her.

Imama finds a sanctuary under Sibt-e-Ali and his family. She changes her name and completes her studies and starts working in a pharmaceutical company in Lahore. She hates Salar because he refused to divorce her as he had promised.

Salar later travels to New Haven for education. There, Imama kept haunting his conscience. After a near death experience at Margalla Hills, he promises to correct his mistakes and walk on the right path. He tries to find Imama but fails, he also feels great guilt in himself but later realizes that is actually love. Unable to find Imama, he then works for United Nations for some time before permanently settling in Lahore. Due to some circumstances, he had to marry a girl he had never seen before, he agrees to marry her but when he sees her for the first time, he recognizes her as Imama. Salar confesses his feeling to her and she embraces and forgives him. Later, the scene shifts near to Kaaba, where Salar and Imama are sitting together worshipping God.

== Characters ==
=== Protagonists ===
- Imama Hashim - An Ahmadi Muslim girl who converts to Sunni Islam.
- Salar Sikander - Imama's rich neighbour, who has an IQ of above 150 and photographic memory.

=== Major characters ===
- Waseem - Imama's brother.
- Jalal - A doctor and older brother of Zainab.
- Hashim Mubeen - Father of Imama and Waseem.
- Sikander Usman - Salar's father.
- Tayyaba - Salar's mother and Sikander Usman's wife.
- Saad Zafar - A friend of Salar in New Haven.
- Dr Furqan - A devoted Muslim and doctor.
- Dr Sibt-e-Ali - An Islamic scholar in Lahore.
- Saeeda Amma - First cousin of Sibt-e-Ali.
