= Umera Ahmed =

Pakistani writer

- عمیرہ احمد
- Born: Sialkot, Pakistan
- Education: Murray College
- Occupations: Fiction writer, screenwriter

Umera Ahmed (Urdu: عمیرہ احمد) is a Pakistani writer, author and screenwriter. She is best known for her novels and plays Shehr-e-Zaat, Pir-e-Kamil, Zindagi Gulzar Hai, Alif, Durr-e-Shehwar, Daam, Man-o-Salwa, Qaid-e-Tanhai, Digest Writer, Maat, Kankar, Meri Zaat Zarra-e-Benishan, Doraha,Hum Kahan Ke Sachay Thay and Dar-e-Nijaat. She is among popular Urdu fiction novelists and screenplay writers.

== Career ==
=== Writing ===
Umera started writing at an early age. Her stories were often published in monthly Urdu Digest magazines. Soon she started publishing books as well. She has written more than 30 books in her career, some novels and other compilations of short stories. Her most famous work, and the one that heightened her career was Peer-e-Kamil and Meri Zaat Zara-e-Benishan. Amarbail is also one of the most famous novel of Umera Ahmed. Umera started her writing career in 1998 when she started publishing stories in the monthly Urdu magazines. Her first story written for the digest magazine was Zindagi Gulzar Hai. The story captured the interest of readers and Umera was soon asked to write a full-length novel. She was 21 when she wrote the story. In 2012, the novel was serialized into a popular drama with the same name. The drama starred Sanam Saeed and Fawad Khan as the lead actors. In an interview Umera said that the character of the lead female, Kashaf in the novel is based on her own character. Umera's stories often revolve around men-women relationships, societal issues and pressures. Her stories depict women as the central theme. Ahmed is also the writer of many other novels that have been serialized into dramas. Her other popular works are Meri Zaat Zarra-e-Benishan for which Ahmed has won the ‘Best Writer’ Award at the tenth Lux Style Awards. The novel was also converted into a drama with the same name. The drama gained much popularity and in 2014, it was also aired in India under the name, Kesi Yeh Qayamat.

Ahmed has also written novels on religion and spirituality. Pir-e-Kamil (2004), Shehr-e-Zaat (2012) and Alif (2019), are some of her novels that focus on spirituality. Her novel Alif, was dramatized into a popular series that starred Hamza Ali Abbassi, Sajal Aly and Kubra Khan. Shehr-e-zaat was also a popular drama starring Mahira Khan. Ahmed has written more than 35 books in her career. Over 22 of her books have been converted into drama series. Her books have also been translated into English and Arabic languages. Juggernaut books translated Ahmed's works into Hindi as well.

=== Screenwriting ===
Many of Ahmed's novels have been created into drama series. However, she has also written stories specifically for dramas and movies. She has collaborated with the director Mehreen Jabbar to produce drama serials that have gained widespread popularity. Recently, she collaborated again to bring a web-series called Aik Jhooti Love Story. The series is a comedy revolving around a couple in Karachi. It stars Billal Abbas Khan and Madiha Imam as lead actors. Aik Jhooti Love Story was released on 30 October 2020 and was launched on ZEE5; a digital entertainment platform.

Ahmed also wrote a screenplay Baaghi, which is based on the late Pakistani model, Qandeel Baloch. The play starred Saba Qamar as the lead actress. Ahmed has also worked on Netflix projects. Her recent work underway is a series about cyberbullying. The series revolves around a female detective investigating a crime. This was the first thriller series by Umera. In an interview Umera said, "This one comes straight from the heart, because I’ve seen so many people suffer because of it. I know how trolling can destroy lives!"

Tumhare Husn ke Naam (2023) is another recent drama written by her in collaboration with Sara Qayyum. It is originally inspired by Hakeem Nayyar Wasty's novel Akhtar aur Salma (1930). Saba Qamar and Imran Abbas have played the lead roles in the drama.

=== Alif Kitab ===
In 2016, Ahmed created Alif Kitab - a digital platform for budding writers to share their work and monetize it. This platform aims to provide editorial guidance to new writers by allowing them to interact with experts. This platform also allows them to submit their writings to media and production houses.

== Selected Work ==
=== Books ===
- Meri Zaat Zarra-e-Benishan
- Pir-e-Kamil
- Amar Bail
- Shehr-e-Zaat
- Man-o-Salwa
- Aab-e-Hayat
- La-Hasil
- Baat Umar Bhar Ki Hai
- Zindagi Gulzar Hai
- Alif
- Kankar
- Qaid-e-Tanhai
- Imaan Umeed Ur Mohabbat
- Hasil
- Husna or Husan Aara
- Maine Khwabon Ka Shajar Dekha Hae
- Harf Se Lafz Tak
- Mere 50 Pasandeeda Scene
- Wapsi
- Shaheen
- Saher Aik Iste'ara Hai
- Darbar E
- Aks
- Ham kahan k Sachhe The
- Kafeel

== Filmography (as a screenwriter) ==
=== Television ===
Year	Title	Network	Notes	Ref(s)
	Mirat-ul-Uroos	Geo Entertainment		
	Daraar	ARY Digital		
	Dooriyan	Hum Sitaray		
	Khoat	ARY Digital		
	Amrat aur Maya	Express Entertainment		
	Saanp Seerhi	Express Entertainment		
	Baji Irshad	Express Entertainment		
2007	Man-o-Salwa	Hum TV	Based on Man-o-Salwa novel	
2008	The Ghost	Hum TV		
2008	Doraha	Geo Entertainment		
2009	Meri Zaat Zarra-e-Benishan	Geo Entertainment		
2009	Malaal	Hum TV		
2010	Qaid-e-Tanhai	Hum TV		
2010	Daam	ARY Digital		
2011	Maat	Hum TV		
2012	Durr-e-Shehwar	Hum TV		
2012	Zindagi Gulzar Hai	Hum TV	Based on Zindagi Gulzar Hai novel	
2012	Shehr-e-Zaat	Hum TV	Based on Shehr-e-Zaat novel	
2013	Kankar	Hum TV	Based on Woh Dil Ke Tehar Kane Ka Mausam novel	
2014	Mohabat Subh Ka Sitara Hai	Hum TV		
2014	Digest Writer	Hum TV		
2015	Abro	Hum TV	Screenplay - Written by Qaisra Hayat	
2016	Jhoot	Hum TV	Screenplay - Written by Reema Ali Syed	
2017	Baaghi	Urdu 1	Screenplay - Based on The Life of Qandeel Baloch written by Shazia Khan	
2017	Baby	Express Entertainment		
2018	Ishq Mein Kaafir	A-Plus TV		
2018	Naulakha	TVOne Pakistan		
2020	Alif	Geo Entertainment		
2021	Hum Kahan Ke Sachay Thay	Hum TV	Based on Hum Kahan Ke Sachay Thay novel	
2022	Sinf-e-Aahan	ARY Digital		
2023	Jannat Se Aagay	Geo Entertainment		
2023	Tumharey Husn Kay Naam	Green Entertainment	Co-writer	
2024	Serial Killer	Green Entertainment		
2025	Kafeel	ARY Digital		
2026	Aap Ki Izzat	Hum TV		
2026	Dar-e-Nijaat	ARY Digital		
2026	Rutba	ARY Digital		

=== Telefilms and web-series ===
- Behadd
- Laal
- Aik Hai Nigaar
- Mutthi Bhar Mitti
- Ek Thi Marium
- Ek Jhoothi Love Story
- Dhoop Ki Deewar

== Awards and nominations ==
- In 2014 Pakistan Media Awards-Best writer of the year award for drama serial Zindagi Gulzar Hai.
- In 2014 Hum Awards- Best Writer Drama Serial for Zindagi Gulzar Hai.

Year	Ceremony	Category	Project	Result	Ref(s)
2011	10th Lux Style Awards	Best Television Writer	Meri Zaat Zarra-e-Benishan	Won	
2012	11th Lux Style Awards	Best Television Writer	Uraan	Nominated	
2012	11th Lux Style Awards	Best Television Writer	Qaid-e-Tanhai	Nominated	
2013	12th Lux Style Awards	Best Television Writer	Maat	Nominated	
2014	13th Lux Style Awards	Best Television Writer	Zindagi Gulzar Hai	Nominated	
2021	20th Lux Style Awards	Best Television Writer	Alif	Won	
2022	8th Hum Awards	Best Writer Drama Serial	Hum Kahan Ke Sachay Thay	Nominated	
2023	22nd Lux Style Awards	Best Television Writer	Sinf-e-Aahan	Nominated	
2025	23rd Lux Style Awards	Best Television Writer	Jannat Se Aagay	Nominated	
