= Farooq Rind =

Pakistani television director

- Born: Kotri, Sindh, Pakistan
- Education: University of Sindh
- Occupation: Television director
- Years active: 2003–present

Farooq Rind is a Pakistani television director. He is best known for his drama serials Sanjha, Rishtay Kuch Adhooray Se, Mere Meherbaan and telefilm Nao Main Darya, which earned him several awards and nominations. He won Hum Award for Best Director Drama Serial for the serial Sanjha.

== Filmography ==
=== Dramas ===
- Saraab
- Qurbat
- Besharam
- Diya Jalaye Rakhna
- Sanjha
- Laa
- Rishtay Kuch Adhooray Se
- Mere Meherbaan
- Mandi
- Jugnoo
- Gul-e-Rana
- Baaghi
- Pukaar
- Ishq Zahe Naseeb
- Pyar Ke Sadqay
- Mohabbat Tumse Nafrat Hai
- Hum Kahan Ke Sachay Thay
- Ishq Murshid
- Humraaz
- Aik Mohabbat Aur

=== Short films ===
- Kaan Ras (2005)
- Chaand Aein Mani (2006)
- Insanon Jaise Log (2007)
- Daani

=== Telefilms ===
- Saans Le Aey Zindagi
- Nao Main Darya (2007)
- Aseen Manhu (Sindhi Solo Play)
- Dharu (Sindhi Play)

== Awards and nominations ==
=== Hum Awards ===
Ceremony	Category	Project	Result
2nd Hum Awards	Best Director Drama Serial	Rishtay Kuch Adhooray Se	style="background: #9EFF9E; color: #000; vertical-align: middle; text-align: center; " class="yes table-yes2 notheme"|Won
3rd Hum Awards	Best Director Drama Serial	Mere Meherbaan	style="background: #FFE3E3; color: black; vertical-align: middle; text-align: center; " class="no table-no2 notheme"|Nominated
10th Hum Awards	Best Director Drama Serial	Ishq Murshid	

=== Lux Style Awards ===
Ceremony	Category	Project	Result
16th Lux Style Awards	Best TV Director	Besharam	Nominated
17th Lux Style Awards	Best TV Director	Baaghi	Nominated
19th Lux Style Awards	Best TV Director	Ishq Zahe Naseeb	Nominated
20th Lux Style Awards	Best TV Director	Pyar Ke Sadqay	Won
21st Lux Style Awards	Best TV Director	Hum Kahan Ke Sachay Thay	Nominated
