= Pakistan International Screen Awards =

Pakistani entertainment awards

- Awarded for: Achievements in Pakistani film, television, music, fashion and digital content
- Location: Dubai, United Arab Emirates
- Country: Pakistan
- First award: 2020
- Final award: 2021

The Pakistan International Screen Awards (PISA) are Pakistan-focused entertainment awards recognising work in film, television, music, fashion and digital content. The awards were founded by Faisal Khan of Mesmerise Events and have been held in Dubai, United Arab Emirates.

The first ceremony was held in 2020 at the Coca-Cola Arena. A second ceremony followed in 2021. A third edition was announced for 2025 after a four-year hiatus, but was postponed shortly before the scheduled event.

== History ==
=== Inaugural ceremony ===
In November 2019, organisers announced that the first Pakistan International Screen Awards would be held at the Coca-Cola Arena in Dubai on 7 February 2020. Nominations were announced in December 2019 and included categories for television, film, music, fashion and social media personalities.

At the 2020 ceremony, Meray Paas Tum Ho won several television awards, including Best TV Play, Best TV Actor for Humayun Saeed, and Best TV Actress for Ayeza Khan. Superstar won Best Picture, while Asim Raza won Best Director for Parey Hut Love.

The inaugural ceremony was criticised by several nominees over travel and attendance arrangements. Nabeel Zafar said his name had been used in promotion but that travel arrangements were not made for him, while other actors also criticised the organisers. Body Beat PR chief Hasan Rizvi later apologised for the mismanagement faced by some nominees.

=== Second ceremony ===
The second ceremony was held on 5 November 2021 at Madinat Jumeirah in Dubai. The nominations covered 24 categories across television, music, fashion and digital content. Film categories were not included because Pakistani cinema had been affected by the COVID-19 pandemic and theatre closures.

The 2021 edition introduced jury categories alongside awards decided by online voting. Pyar Ke Sadqay won Best TV Serial, Best Director for Farooq Rind and Best Writer for Zanjabeel Asim Shah. Other winners included Feroze Khan, Sarah Khan, Mohib Mirza, Sonya Hussyn, Asim Azhar, Aima Baig, Khaadi, Romaisa Khan and Ducky Bhai.

The second ceremony also received criticism after some nominees reportedly had tickets cancelled shortly before the event. In January 2022, actor Ali Abbas said he had been told that he had won Best Supporting Actor before the award was given to Ahmed Ali Butt at the ceremony.

=== Planned third ceremony ===
In October 2025, nominations were announced for the third edition of PISA, which was scheduled for 22 November 2025 at Dubai's Festival Arena after a four-year hiatus. The nominations covered 22 of 24 categories across film, television, music, fashion and digital content. The announced jury included Hassan Choudary, Taimoor Salahuddin, Kamran Jawaid, Maliha Rehman and Sabah Bano Malik, with Aamna Isani as jury manager.

On 20 November 2025, the organisers postponed the ceremony, citing visa processing delays affecting nominees, performers and other participants. A new date was expected to be announced later.

== Ceremonies ==
Year	Ceremony	Date	Venue	Notes	Ref.
2020	1st Pakistan International Screen Awards	7 February 2020	Coca-Cola Arena, Dubai	First ceremony; awards included film, television, music, fashion and social media categories.	
2021	2nd Pakistan International Screen Awards	5 November 2021	Madinat Jumeirah, Dubai	Film categories were not included because of the effect of the COVID-19 pandemic on Pakistani cinema.	
2025	3rd Pakistan International Screen Awards	—	Festival Arena, Dubai	Postponed before the scheduled ceremony because of visa processing delays.	

== Award categories ==
PISA has presented or announced awards in five broad fields: film, television, music, fashion and digital content. The 2021 ceremony excluded film categories because of the disruption to cinema releases during the COVID-19 pandemic, while the planned 2025 edition restored film categories and added digital creator categories such as TikToker of the Year, short-form video creator and long-form video creator.

== Selected winners ==
Category	2020 winner	2021 winner
Best film / picture	Superstar	Not awarded
Best film director	Asim Raza – Parey Hut Love	Not awarded
Best film actor	Sheheryar Munawar – Parey Hut Love	Not awarded
Best film actress	Mahira Khan – Superstar	Not awarded
Best television play / serial	Meray Paas Tum Ho	Pyar Ke Sadqay
Best television director	Nadeem Baig – Meray Paas Tum Ho	Farooq Rind – Pyar Ke Sadqay
Best television writer	Khalil-ur-Rehman Qamar – Meray Paas Tum Ho	Zanjabeel Asim Shah – Pyar Ke Sadqay
Best television actor	Humayun Saeed – Meray Paas Tum Ho	Feroze Khan – Ishqiya
Best television actress	Ayeza Khan – Meray Paas Tum Ho	Sarah Khan – Sabaat
Critics / jury television actor	Adnan Siddiqui – Meray Paas Tum Ho	Mohib Mirza – Dushman-e-Jaan
Critics / jury television actress	Sana Javed – Ruswai	Sonya Hussyn – Saraab
Song of the Year	"Baari" – Bilal Saeed and Momina Mustehsan	"Uchiyaan Dewaraan (Baari 2)" – Bilal Saeed and Momina Mustehsan
Fashion model	Sadaf Kanwal	Fahmeen Ansari
Designer / brand	Hassan Sheheryar Yasin	Khaadi
YouTuber of the Year	Ducky Bhai	Ducky Bhai

== Criticism ==
PISA has been criticised for organisational problems at its first two ceremonies. Before the 2020 ceremony, several nominees said they had been invited or promoted in connection with the event but were not provided travel arrangements to attend the ceremony in Dubai. Similar criticism followed the 2021 ceremony after some nominees reportedly had tickets cancelled shortly before the event. Abbas later questioned the credibility of the awards after saying he had been told he had won a supporting actor award that was ultimately presented to Butt.
