= 9th Hum Awards =

2024 Pakistani entertainment awards

- Date: 28 September 2024
- Site: OVO Arena, Wembley, London
- Hosted by: Ahmad Ali Butt; Ahad Raza Mir; Ahmed Ali Akbar; Ramsha Khan; Yumna Zaidi
- Produced by: Hum Network

Television coverage
- Channel: Hum TV
- Network: Hum

The 9th Hum Awards by Hum Network Limited honored the best in Pakistan's fashion, music, and Hum Television Dramas of 2022 and 2023. The awards ceremony took place on 28 September 2024 at the OVO Arena in Wembley, London. The ceremony was televised in Pakistan by Hum TV. It was hosted by Ahmad Ali Butt, Ahad Raza Mir, Ahmed Ali Akbar, Ramsha Khan and Yumna Zaidi.

Sang-e-Mah received 12 nominations, the most for any series, and was followed by Jhok Sarkar (11 nominations). Sang-e-Mah led the ceremony with 7 awards, followed by Jhok Sarkar and Fairy Tale, which each won 3 awards.

== Winners and nominees ==
In September 2024, the nominees for the five viewers' choice categories were announced through the Network's website and official social media handles. The nominees were of the years 2022 and 2023 while some categories had combined nominees of both years.

Winners are listed first and highlighted in boldface.

2022 Awards
**Best Drama Serial**: **Sang-e-Mah**; Bakhtawar; Hum Tum; Dobara; Ishq-e-Laa; Tinkay Ka Sahara
**Best Director Drama Serial**: **Saife Hassan – Sang-e-Mah**; Shahid Shafaat - Bakhtawar; Danish Nawaz - Dobara; Danish Nawaz - Hum Tum; Amin Iqbal - Ishq-e-Laa; Zeeshan Ahmed - Tinkay Ka Sahara; Khizer Idrees - Badshah Begum	**Best Writer Drama Serial**: **Mustafa Afridi – Sang-e-Mah**; Saima Akram Chaudhry – Hum Tum; Nadia Akhtar - Bakhtawar; Sarwat Nazir - Dobara; Zanjabeel Asim Shah - Tinkay Ka Sahara; Qaisra Hayat - Ishq-e-Laa
**Best Actor**: **Bilal Abbas Khan – Dobara**; Atif Aslam - Sang-e-Mah; Ahad Raza Mir - Hum Tum; Azaan Sami Khan - Ishq-e-Laa; Sami Khan - Tinkay Ka Sahara; Farhan Saeed – Badshah Begum	**Best Actress**: **Yumna Zaidi – Bakhtawar''**; Ramsha Khan – Hum Tum; Kubra Khan – Sang-e-Mah; Hania Amir - Sang-e-Mah; Hadiqa Kiani - Dobara; Yumna Zaidi - Ishq-e-Laa; Sonya Hussyn - Tinkay Ka Sahara
**Best Onscreen Couple**: **Ahad Raza Mir & Ramsha Khan – Hum Tum**; Atif Aslam & Kubra Khan – Sang-e-Mah; Zaviyar Nauman Ijaz & Hania Amir – Sang-e-Mah; Bilal Abbas Khan & Hadiqa Kiani – Dobara; Azaan Sami Khan & Yumna Zaidi - Ishq-e-Laa
2023 Awards
**Best Drama Serial**: **Fairy Tale**; Muhabbat Gumshuda Meri; Neem; Jhok Sarkar; Yunhi; Mere Ban Jao
**Best Director Drama Serial**: **Shahid Shafaat – Muhabbat Gumshuda Meri**; Saife Hassan - Jhok Sarkar; Shahzad Kashmiri - Neem; Mohammed Ehteshamuddin- Yunhi; Ali Hassan - Fairy Tale; Syed Ahmed Kamran - Mere Ban Jao	**Best Writer Drama Serial**: **Hashim Nadeem - Jhok Sarkar**; Rahat Jabeen - Muhabbat Gumshuda Meri; Kashif Anwer - Neem; Sarwat Nazir- Yunhi; Sarah Majeed - Fairy Tale; Samira Fazal - Mere Ban Jao
**Best Actor**: **Khushhal Khan – Muhabbat Gumshuda Meri**; **Hamza Sohail - Fairy Tale**; Ameer Gilani - Neem; Zahid Ahmed - Mere Ban Jao; Bilal Ashraf - Yunhi; Farhan Saeed - Jhok Sarkar	**Best Actress**: **Mawra Hocane - Neem**; Dananeer Mobeen - Muhabbat Gumshuda Meri; Kinza Hashmi - Mere Ban Jao; Maya Ali - Yunhi; Hiba Bukhari - Jhok Sarkar; Sehar Khan - Fairy Tale
**Best Onscreen Couple**: **Hamza Sohail & Sehar Khan - Fairy Tale**; Khushhal Khan & Dananeer Mobeen- Muhabbat Gumshuda Meri; Ameer Gilani & Mawra Hocane - Neem; Farhan Saeed & Hiba Bukhari - Jhok Sarkar; Bilal Ashraf & Maya Ali - Yunhi; Zahid Ahmed & Kinza Hashmi - Mere Ban Jao
2023 & 2023 combine Awards
**Best Actor in a Negative Role**: **Syed Jibran – Neem**; Nauman Ijaz - Sang-e-Mah; Yasir Hussain - Badshah Begum; Usman Javed - Jhok Sarkar; Azfar Rehman - Mere Ban Jao	**Most Impactful Character**: **Sania Saeed - Sang-e-Mah**; Sajal Aly - Ishq-e-Laa; Yumna Zaidi - Bakhtawar; Asif Raza Mir - Jhok Sarkar
**Best Supporting Actor**: **Asif Raza Mir – Jhok Sarkar**; Adnan Samad Khan – Ishq-e-Laa; Azfar Rehman – Mere Ban Jao; Zaviyar Nauman Ijaz – Sang-e-Mah; Usama Khan - Dobara	**Best Supporting Actress**: **Samiya Mumtaz – Sang-e-Mah**; Uzma Hassan – Ishq-e-Laa; Zoya Nasir – Dobara; Aena Khan – Fairy Tale; Mamya Shajaffar – Jhok Sarkar
**Best Television Sensation Male**: **Atif Aslam – Sang-e-Mah**	**Best Television Sensation Female**: **Mamya Shahjaffar – Jhok Sarkar**
**Best Original Soundtrack Popular**: **Ja Baja Tu Chal Diya for Sang-e-Mah – Sahir Ali Bagga & Momina Duraid Productions**; Murshid Re for Bakhtawar – Shiraz Uppal & Momina Duraid Productions; Ibaadat for Ishq-e-Laa – Azaan Sami Khan & Momina Duraid Productions; Aa Miley Ho Yunhi for Yunhi – Sami Khan & Momina Duraid Productions; Dil Lagaya Hai Dobara for Dobara – Shuja Haider & Momina Duraid Productions
