= Hum Tum (2022 TV series) =

2022 Pakistani television series

- Title poster
- Urdu: ہم تم
- Genre: Comedy; Romance; Family drama
- Created by: MD Productions
- Written by: Saima Akram Chaudhry
- Screenplay by: Saima Akram Chaudhary
- Directed by: Danish Nawaz
- Creative director: Danish Nawaz
- Starring: Ahad Raza Mir; Ramsha Khan; Junaid Khan; Sarah Khan; (See full cast)
- Theme music composer: Wajid Saeed
- Opening theme: "Hum Tum" by Ali Zafar and Damia Farooq
- Ending theme: "Hum Tum" by Ali Zafar and Damia Farooq
- Composer: Naveed Nashad
- Country of origin: Pakistan
- Original language: Urdu
- No. of seasons: 1
- No. of episodes: 31

Production
- Producer: Momina Duraid
- Production locations: Karachi, Sindh, Pakistan
- Cinematography: Tameen Nizami
- Editor: MD Productions
- Camera setup: Multi-camera setup
- Running time: 34-36 mins
- Production company: MD Productions

Original release
- Network: Hum TV; Hum TV Europe; Hum TV MENA
- Release: 3 April – 3 May 2022

Related
- Chand Tara; Fairy Tale

Hum Tum (lit. 'Me and You') is a 2022 Pakistani Ramadan special television comedy drama series, produced by Momina Duraid under her production banner MD Productions. Directed by Danish Nawaz and written by Saima Akram Chaudhry, it aired on Hum TV from 3 April 2022 to 3 May 2022, with the last episode airing on the first day of Eid-ul-Fitr 2022. The series starred Ahad Raza Mir, Ramsha Khan, Sarah Khan and Junaid Khan as leads.

The series revolves around two houses in one neighborhood. The family in one house includes three intelligent girls, while the other household has good mannered boys. The series met with positive reviews, critical acclaim and praises from audience across Pakistan, India, UAE, UK and Bangladesh. At the 9th Hum Awards, the series received four nominations and won Best Onscreen Couple Popular for Ahad Raza Mir and Ramsha Khan.

== Plot ==
Qutub Mahal consists of Qutub Ud Din, Ulfat (his wife), his father Safiullah who is a tik-toker and three intelligent daughters - Maha, Neha, and Sasha. Qutub always desired having a son, and so he treated Adam (his neighbor Sultan's son) like his son. Adam, who always aspired for father's love and never got it from Sultan, deeply respected and cared for Qutub too. Due to this, Neha and Adam shared a mutual dislike and always got in fights with each other. However, their older siblings - Maha and Sarmad were much more mature.

Sarmad owned a restaurant and had a crush on Maha. Halima (Sultan's wife, Adam, Maliha & Sarmad's mother) figures out about Sarmad's crush and promises him to get him married with Maha. Sultan rejects the idea as Maha is a divorcee but later agrees after he overhears Qutub giving his property to Maha.

Professor Jabir (a professor at Neha and Adam's university who hated Qutub as he thought Qutub favoured Neha & Adam) blamed Qutub for favouring Neha and Adam. Qutub comes to a decision that Jabir will conduct Neha & Adam's viva this time. Neha is overconfident that she'll be winning the viva. However, due to Jabir's hatred for Qutub, Adam tops the viva and Neha gets on the second rank. Neha realises Jabir's biasedness and decides to take revenge. She asks her younger sister, Sasha, to hack Jabir's social media account and post an apology to her for the viva biasedness. The dean sees this and appreciates Jabir's honesty. The dean approve of Jabir's Germany project. Going to Germany was Jabir's dream. He begins to favour Neha and friended Qutub. Jabir leaves for Germany and his son, Sarim, replaces him to take his classes. Upon Jabir's suggestion on Neha being an excellent student, Sarim begins to spend more and more time with Neha, helping her on her project with Adam.

Adam begins to feel jealous and overhears Jabir asking for Neha's hand for Sarim. He realises he has fallen in love with Neha. He tells this to his best friend, Umar. While he was telling it to him, Neha overhears them and takes advantage of Adam's feelings. Maha & Sarmad are married after Neha & Adam's endless attempts to break their marriage. Qutub asks Neha to marry Sarim, and she asks him to do whatever he thinks is right for her. Right after Maha & Sarmad's wedding, the preparations for Neha & Sarim's engagement starts. Adam is very emotional to see the engagement and Neha feels uneasy to see him crying.

Next day, Sarim forcefully holds Neha's hand at the university. Adam intervenes and pulls his hand off her. Qutub is very mad at Adam after this and blames himself for treating Adam better than his own blood. Soon later, Qutub realises his mistake and calls Neha in his study to talk to her. He tells her that she wants Adam to be her life partner and want to break her engagement with Sarim. Neha tells her father that she'll think about it. Next morning, Sarim and his father arrive at the Qutub Mahal and declares that they want to break the engagement.

Both the houses (Qutub Mahal and Sultan Family) approve of the marriage of Neha & Adam. After that, they meet in their garden and confess their love for each other. Maha & Sarmad find out they are having a baby. So both the couples get their happy ending, with Neha & Adam getting married and Maha & Sarmad having a baby.

== Cast ==
=== Main ===
- Ahad Raza Mir as Adam "Adi" Sultan - Sultan and Halima's younger son; Sarmad and Maliha's brother; Tamanna's grandson; Neha's love interest turned husband.
- Ramsha Khan as Neha Qutub ud Din - Qutub and Ulfat's second daughter; Maha and Sasha's sister; Safiullah's granddaughter; Adam's love interest turned wife.
- Junaid Khan as Sarmad Sultan - Sultan's and Haleema's elder son; Adam and Maliha's brother; Tamanna's grandson; Maha's husband.
- Sarah Khan as Maha Qutub ud Din / Maha Sarmad Sultan - Qutub and Ulfat's eldest daughter; Neha and Sasha's sister; Safiullah's granddaughter; Sarmad's wife.

=== Recurring ===
- Adnan Jaffar as Professor Qutub ud Din - Safiullah's son; Ulfat's husband; Maha, Neha and Sasha's father; Sultan's childhood friend, Neha and Adam's Professor and Head of Chemistry Department.
- Arjumand Rahim as Ulfat Qutub ud Din: Qutub's wife; Maha, Neha and Sasha's mother.
- Farhan Ally Agha as Sultan Mansoor - Haleema's husband; Sarmad, Adam and Maliha's father; Qutub's childhood friend.
- Munazzah Arif as Haleema Sultan - Tamanna's daughter; Sultan's wife; Sarmad, Adam and Maliha's mother.
- Syed Mohammad Ahmed as Safiullah "Safi" - Qutub's father; Maha, Neha, Sasha's grandfather and a widowed TikToker.
- Uzma Beg as Tamanna Begum: Haleema's mother - Sarmad, Adam, Mili's maternal grandmother who runs an unsuccessful marriage bureau.
- Anoushey Rania Khan as Sasha Qutub ud Din aka "Zombie Virus" - Qutub and Ulfat's youngest daughter; Safiullah's granddaughter; Maha and Neha's sister.
- Aina Asif as Maliha "Mili" Sultan - Sultan and Haleema's daughter; Tamanna's granddaughter; Sarmad and Adam's sister.
- Omer Shahzad as Sarim Jabir - Jabir's son; Neha's ex-fiancé.
- Danish Ali as Umar - Adam's best friend.
- Ayesha Sohail as Hira - Neha's best friend.

=== Guest appearances ===
- Saife Hassan as Professor Jabir - Qutub's colleague; Sarim's father.
- Hina Rizvi as Nargis - Safi's failed marriage prospective.
- Salma Asim as Professor Saleha - Qutub's colleague; Ibtehaj's mother.
- Ayaz Khan as a professor at the university.
- Bilal Cuto as Ibtehaj - Saleha's son; Maha's prospective groom.

== Production ==
=== Development ===
In December 2021, writer Saima Akram Chaudhry revealed in an interview that one of her upcoming Ramadan play is titled Hum Tum, which will begin shooting in January. In January 2022, it was reported that Danish Nawaz will direct the series, which made this his second collaboration with writer after the 2021 series Chupke Chupke.

The series is produced by Momina Duraid under her banner MD Productions. It marks Ahad Raza Mir's third and Ramsha Khan's first collaboration with the production house.

=== Casting ===
In January 2022, it was reported that Ahad Raza Mir and Ramsha Khan joined the leading cast as Adam and Neha. In February 2022, the casting of Sarah Khan and Junaid Khan was confirmed, in the leading roles, with Khan and Mir. Before Sarah Khan, Zoya Nasir was approached for the part which she declined due to her scheduling conflict with Geo TV's Ramadan special Chaudhry and Sons.

Besides the leading cast, Arjumand Rahim, Adnan Jaffar, Munazza Arif, Syed Mohammad Ahmed, Uzma Beg and Farhan Ally Agha, Anoushey Rania Khan and Aina Asif, were chosen to portray the supporting roles. It was also confirmed that YouTuber, Danish Ali has joined the cast in a supporting role, marking his television debut.

=== Filming ===
The series is primarily set and mainly shot in Karachi. The filming began in January 2022. Filming of the university scenes in the series took place on various locations at the Salim Habib University in Karachi.

== Release ==
=== Broadcast ===
Hum Tum was released as a Ramdan special on 3 April 2022 on Hum TV. It aired daily at the time slot of 9:00 pm, with an hour episode.

=== International broadcast ===
Hum Tum was also aired in United Kingdom, United States and United Arab Emirates. It was made available in India and Bangladesh through YouTube.

Year	Country	Network	Ref.
2022	United Kingdom	Hum Europe	
2022	United States	Hum TV USA	
2022	United Arab Emirates	Hum TV Mena	

== Reception ==
=== Critical reception ===
The series met with mostly positive reviews. It received praises for the cast performances, the portrayal of girls as independent and boys handling kitchen, and for breaking gender stereotypes and tackling issues such as marriage of a divorcee, inheritance division in case of no male heirs and mental health in a light heart manner.

Images Dawn noted, "The series is a 2022, modern and Gen Z rendition of a hate to love story. It has won over viewers with its refreshing content by reversing roles and smashing gender stereotypes." Something Haute wrote, "Hum Tum has caught our eye with its fresh take on manhood, relatable characters and a humorous plot." Galaxy Lollywood noted, "Hum Tum has its strength in its characters. The most refreshing thing in the show is how it does not indulge in the usual TV friendly gender stereotypes and has characters that actually feel like they belong in the year the drama is based in.

=== Television ratings ===
Apart from critical acclaim, Hum Tum was one of the most popular dramas of 2022. The series achieved its highest rating of 5.3 TRP in its 21st episode.

Episode No.	Date	TRP	Ref.
1	3 April 2022	4.5	
2	4 April 2022	3.71	
3	5 April 2022	3.76	
4	6 April 2022	4.2	
5	7 April 2022	3.9	
6	8 April 2022	4.1	
7	9 April 2022	3.7	
8	10 April 2022	3.9	
9	11 April 2022	4.27	
10	12 April 2022	3.8	
11	13 April 2022	4.5	
12	14 April 2022	4.5	
13	15 April 2022	3.8	
14	16 April 2022	4.0	
15	17 April 2022	4.8	
16	18 April 2022	4.1	
17	19 April 2022	4.1	
18	20 April 2022	4.8	
19	21 April 2022	3.8	
20	22 April 2022	4.2	
21	23 April 2022	5.3	
22	24 April 2022	5.0	
23	25 April 2022	5.0	
24	26 April 2022	4.6	
25	27 April 2022	4.2	
26	28 April 2022	4.0	
27	29 April 2022	4.5	
28	30 April 2022	4.75	
29	1 May 2022	4.75	
30	2 May 2022	4.5	
31	3 May 2022	4.1	

== Accolades ==
Award	Date of ceremony	Category	Recipient	Result	Ref.
Lux Style Awards	6 October 2023	Best TV Play	Hum Tum	Nominated	
Lux Style Awards	6 October 2023	Best Ensemble Play	Hum Tum	Nominated	
Lux Style Awards	6 October 2023	Best TV Actress	Ramsha Khan	Nominated	
Lux Style Awards	6 October 2023	Best TV Original Soundtrack	Ali Zafar, Damia Farooq and Naveed Nashad	Nominated	
Hum Awards	28 September 2024	Best Drama Serial Popular	Hum Tum	Nominated	
Hum Awards	28 September 2024	Best Actor Popular	Ahad Raza Mir	Nominated	
Hum Awards	28 September 2024	Best Actress Popular	Ramsha Khan	Nominated	
Hum Awards	28 September 2024	Best Onscreen Couple Popular	Ahad Raza Mir and Ramsha Khan	Won	

== Impact ==
Hum Tum was ranked by the Pakistani media as one of the best and most watched drama of 2022. Ahad Raza Mir and Ramsha Khan received positive feedback for their portrayal of Adam and Neha, and for breaking various stereotypes. Mir and Khan's pair was termed as one of the most loved on-screen couple of 2022. The Express Tribune added it in its "Best Ramazan Romantic Comedies" list. The series has often trended on Twitter and YouTube. It is one of the most watched Pakistani drama series on YouTube with over 600 million views.
