= Neeli Kothi =

Pakistani television series

- Written by: Saima Akram Chaudhry
- Directed by: Anjum Shahzad
- Starring: Anmol Baloch; Talha Chahour; Srha Asghar; Sabeena Syed; Ahmed Rafique; Atiqa Odho; Usman Peerzada; Saleem Mairaj
- Country of origin: Pakistan
- Original language: Urdu
- No. of seasons: 1
- No. of episodes: 26

Production
- Producer: Moomal Shunaid
- Production companies: Momal Productions; MD Productions

Original release
- Network: Hum TV
- Release: 8 December 2025 – 3 March 2026

Neeli Kothi is a Pakistani television drama series that aired on Hum TV from 8 December 2025 to 3 March 2026. The series was written by Saima Akram Chaudhry, directed by Anjum Shahzad, and produced by Moomal Shunaid under Momal Productions and MD Productions.

The story follows Zara, a young woman whose family circumstances become complicated by disputes and personal conflicts. Her life becomes intertwined with Zaid, while questions of family relationships, inheritance and social injustice shape the narrative.

== Cast ==
- Anmol Baloch as Zara
- Talha Chahour as Zaid
- Srha Asghar as Elayna
- Maham Naqvi as Bisma
- Ahmed Rafique as Shaheer
- Sabeena Syed
- Atiqa Odho
- Usman Peerzada
- Saleem Mairaj
- Sahiba Afzal
