= Qarar =

- Genre: Melodrama; Romance
- Written by: Aliya Bukhari
- Directed by: Barkat Siddiqui
- Starring: Sanam Jung; Rabab Hashim; Muneeb Butt; Mikaal Zulfiqar
- Country of origin: Pakistan
- Original language: Urdu
- No. of episodes: 27

Production
- Producers: Momina Duraid; Barkat Siddiqui
- Production locations: Karachi, (Sindh) Pakistan
- Running time: 40 Minutes
- Production companies: MD Productions; ProMax Media

Original release
- Release: 8 November 2020 – 9 May 2021

Qarar (Urdu: قرار) is a 2020 Pakistani drama television series that premiered on Hum TV on 8 November 2020. Written by Aliya Bukhari, it has Sanam Jung, Mikaal Zulfiqar, Muneeb Butt, and Rabab Hashim in lead roles.

== Cast ==
- Sanam Jung as Maya
- Rabab Hashim as Fariha
- Muneeb Butt as Ammar
- Mikaal Zulfiqar as Junaid
- Seemi Pasha as Nadra
- Waseem Abbas as Siraj
- Sangeeta as Naani
- Ali Safina as Salman
- Rimsha Khan as Zaib Un Nisa
- Umair
- Shahzad Nawaz (minor appearance)

== Soundtrack ==
"Qarar"

Single by Rahat Fateh Ali Khan
- Language: Urdu
- Released: 15 November 2020
- Recorded: 2020
- Genre: Soundtrack
- Length: 2:40
- Label: MD Productions; ProMax Media
- Composer: Waqar Ali
- Lyricist: Asim Raza
- Producer: Momina Duraid Barkat Siddiqui

Music video
- "Qarar" OST on YouTube

The official soundtrack of the serial has been composed by Waqar Ali while lyrics were written by Sabir Zafar. The OST was performed by Rahat Fateh Ali Khan.
