= Pamaal =

2025 Pakistani television series

- Genre: Drama; Social issue
- Written by: Zanjabeel Asim Shah
- Directed by: Khizer Idress
- Starring: Saba Qamar; Usman Mukhtar
- Opening theme: O Harjai by Shahid Amin
- Country of origin: Pakistan
- Original language: Urdu
- No. of seasons: 1
- No. of episodes: 28

Production
- Producer: Tehreem Chaudhary
- Camera setup: Multi-camera setup
- Running time: Approximately 28–38 minutes
- Production company: Multiverse Entertainment

Original release
- Network: Green Entertainment
- Release: 6 October 2025 – 6 June 2026

Pamaal (Urdu: پامال; lit. Trampled) is a Pakistani television drama series that premiered on 6 October 2025 on Green Entertainment. It was written by Zanjabeel Asim Shah, directed by Khizer Idrees, and produced by Tehreem Chaudhary under the banner of Multiverse Entertainment. The series stars Saba Qamar as Malika, alongside Usman Mukhtar in leading roles. The series follows the journey of a woman whose decision to marry for love leads to emotional hardship, forcing her to rebuild her identity and independence.

It was inspired by a real-life story. It received critical acclaim for its portrayal and performances.

== Plot ==
The series follows Malika (Saba Qamar), an aspiring writer from a middle-class family who chooses love over tradition and marries Raza (Usman Mukhtar), a wealthy and seemingly devoted man. However, after marriage, Raza's controlling behaviour gradually restricts Malika's freedom, independence and personal identity. He attempts to dictate her social interactions, choices and writing career, subjecting her to psychological manipulation and emotional abuse. As their relationship deteriorates, Malika struggles to reclaim her self-worth and identity while navigating the challenges of marriage, family expectations and personal independence.

== Cast ==
- Saba Qamar as Malika Riaz
- Usman Mukhtar as Raza
- Haris Waheed as Anas
- Salma Asim as Geeti
- Adnan Jaffar as Shahood
- Faiza Gillani as Safia
- Naima Khan as Farzana
- Shahnawaz Zaidi as Kamil
- Fatiq as Omer

== Production ==
Pamaal was written by Zanjabeel Asim Shah and directed by Khizer Idrees. The series was produced by Tehreem Chaudhary under the banner Multiverse Entertainment. Principal photography took place from August to November 2026 in Islamabad and Murree.

== Release ==
The series premiered on October 6, 2025 on Green Entertainment, with episodes also made available on YouTube.

== Reception ==
Pamaal received attention for the leads' performances and its portrayal of emotional and psychological struggles within marriage.

In a review of the first-two episodes for The News International, the reviewer praised direction, visuals, and performance of Qamar but found Mukhtar's performance repetitive due to his familiar brooding expression.

The Friday Times praised the performances of Saba Qamar, Usman Mukhtar, the supporting cast, and the beautiful Murree setting, but criticised the flawed script, unrealistic situations, inconsistent characterisation, and weak storytelling, arguing that these shortcomings prevent the series from reaching its potential.

In November 2025, MNA Sharmila Faruqui praised Pamaal for highlighting psychological manipulation and emotional abuse faced by women in marriages. She described coercive control as a widespread but often overlooked form of domestic abuse, stating that marriage should be a partnership rather than a prison.

== Awards and nominations ==
Year	Award	Category	Recipient(s) / Nominee(s)	Result	Ref(s)
2026	3rd Sunday Special Icon Awards	Most Impactful Social Drama Of The Year	Pamaal	Nominated	
2026	3rd Sunday Special Icon Awards	Best Drama Writer Of The Year	Zanjabeel Asim Shah	Nominated	
