= Barkat Siddiqui =

Pakistani actor, director and producer

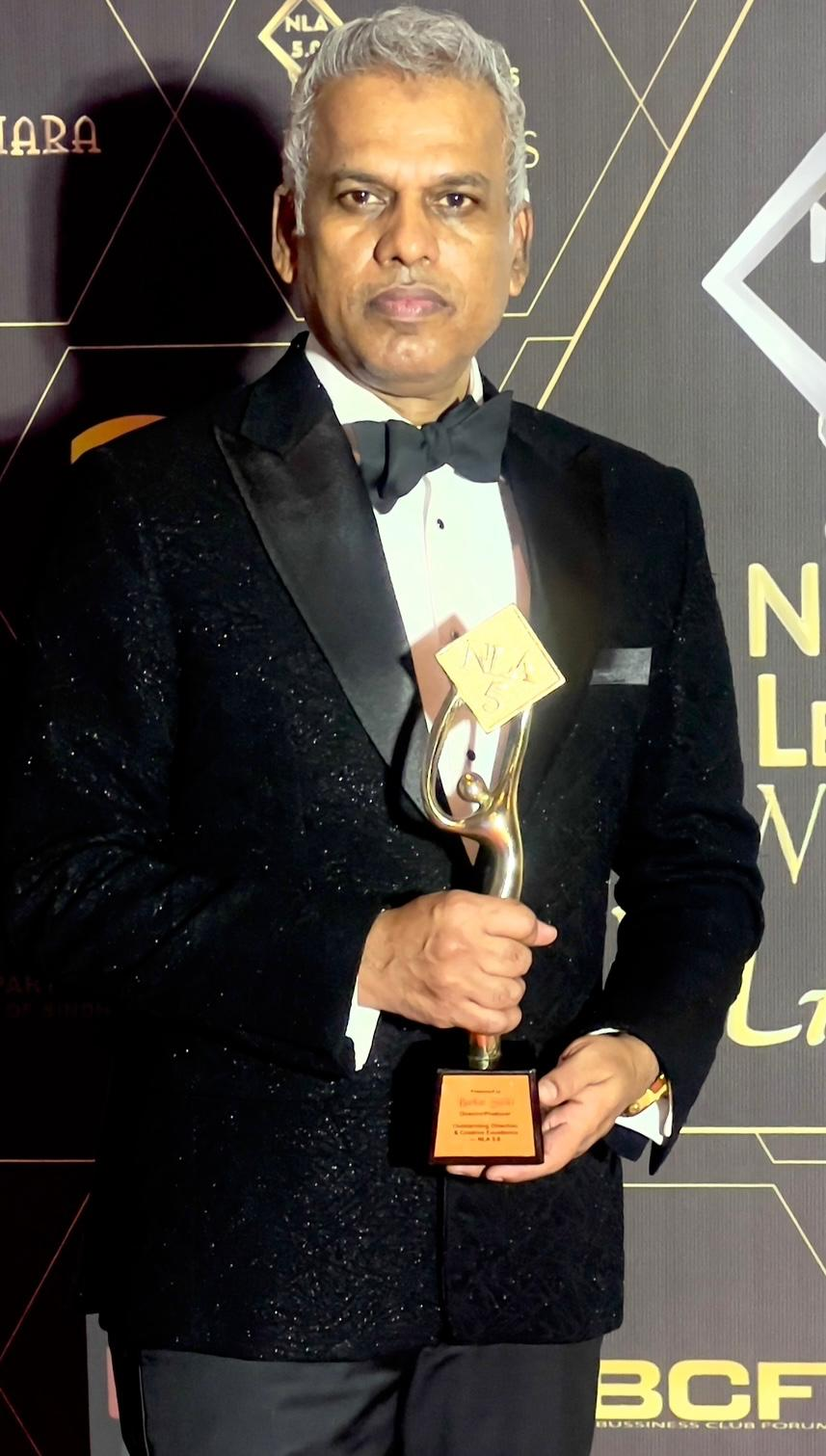
- Born: Barkat Ali Sidiki; 2 April 1969 (age 57); Karachi, Sindh, Pakistan
- Occupations: Television producer, Television director, Actor , Promax Media Production
- Years active: 1998–present
- Spouse: NA
- Children: NA
- Website: www.promaxmedia.tv

Barkat Siddiqui is also known as Barkat Ali Sidiki is a Pakistani television director, producer and actor. He is best known as the director of the PTV drama serial Ahsaas (2001) and Mujhe Khuda Pe Yaqeen Hai (2013) on Hum TV for which he earned nominations as Best Director Drama Serial and Best Drama Serial at 2nd Hum Awards.

== Career ==
Siddiqui started his career in 1998s. He has acted in two serial including Naseeb and Jeena Isi Ka Naam Hai; both work were received extravagant reception and met with positive and critical response. Later he pursued his career in directing and producing. He has a long-term relation with actor-producer Nadeem Baig with him he has collaborated in the serial Chain aye Na, Socha Na Tha and Qudrat. He has directed some very popular serial including Mujhe Khuda Pe Yaqeen Hai which earned him more acclaim.

== Television Series ==
Following is the listing of brief work by Siddiqui:

Following is the list of Drama Series & Tv Sereias Produce and Direct by Barkat Sidiki
Year	Title	Channel	As	No. Of Episode	References
1998	Teesra Pher	PTV Home	Actor	30	
1999	Payal	PTV World	Actor/ Director	30	
1999	Target	PTV World	Actor/Director		
1999	Ek Zara si bhool	PTV Home	Director	30	
2000	Jang	PTV	Director		
2001	Suraj Girhan	PTV Home	Director	30	
2002	Dil Hi to Hai	PTV Home	Director	30	
2002	Mujhey Pyar Chahiye	PTV Home	Director		
2005	Jan Jab Dil Milay	PTV Home	Director		
2005	Masuri	PTV Home	Director		
2005	Kushboo	A-Plus	Director/Producer	35	
2005	Gilla Kis Sy Karain	A-Plus	Director/Producer		
2006	Shikwa	GEO	Director/Producer		

=== As a director ===
- Mujhey Pyar Chahiye
- Ahsaas
- Jab Jab Dil Milay
- Qudrat
- Socha Na Tha
- Chein Aaye Naa
- Mujhe Khuda Pe Yaqeen Hai
- Kaisi Hain Doorian
- Barish Kay Aansoo
- Mere Khuda
- Seep (TV series)
- Mohabbat Tujhe Alvida
- Qarar
- Bebasi
- Masoom

=== As a producer ===
- Jeena Isi Ka Naam Hai
- Kaisi Hain Doorian
- Mujhe Khuda Pe Yaqeen Hai
- Seep (TV series)
- Mohabbat Tujhe Alvida
- Qarar
- Bebasi

== Awards and nominations ==
Award	Date of ceremony	Drama serial	Category	Result
Hum Awards	March 29, 2014	Mujhe Khuda Pe Yaqeen Hai	Best Drama Serial	Nominated
Hum Awards	March 29, 2014	Mujhe Khuda Pe Yaqeen Hai	Best Director Drama Serial	Nominated

=== Lux Style Awards ===
Ceremony	Category	Project	Result
7th Lux Style Awards	Best TV Director (Satellite)	Shikwah	Nominated
8th Lux Style Awards	Best TV Director (Satellite)	Gatt Jor	Nominated
