= Sehar Khan =

Pakistani actress and model

- سحرخان
- Born: 29 May 2000 (age 26); Karachi, Pakistan
- Education: University of Karachi
- Occupation: Actress
- Years active: 2018 – present

Sehar Khan (born 29 May 2000) is a Pakistani television actress and model. Khan made her debut with soap opera Sanwari in 2018 and rose to prominence with her portrayals in romances Fasiq and Rang Mahal (both 2021). Her role in the romantic-comedy Fairy Tale (2023) earned her wider recognition and a Hum Award.

== Early life ==
Sehar was born in Karachi, Pakistan. She received her bachelor's degree from the University of Karachi.

== Career ==
She played in Sanwari as Shama. Then she worked in drama Naqab Zan with Ali Abbas, Hajra Yamin, Ali Ansari and Saboor Aly. Then she worked in dramas Main Agar Chup Hoon, Wafa Kar Chalay, Dikhawa Season 2 and rose to fame through Rang Mahal.

Since then she appeared in dramas Zakham, Farq, Haqeeqat, Fasiq and Mushk. She also appeared in telefim Teri Meri Kahani as Zara with Bushra Ansari, Haroon Kadwani, Usman Peerzada and Jawed Sheikh.

In 2023, She appeared Ramadan special television series Fairy Tale and Fairy Tale 2 alongside Hamza Sohail. In 2024, Sehar Khan appeared in Jafaa, along with Usman Mukhtar, and Tan Man Neelo Neel, along with Shuja Asad. In 2025, she played the lead role of Rakshi Butt in Green Entertainment's Ramadan special television series Ishq Di Chashni, opposite Khushhal Khan.

Later in 2025, She reunited with Saife Hassan, after the success of Tan Man Neelo Neel, in Jinn Ki Shadi Unki Shadi. She played the role of a female djinn, opposite Wahaj Ali. In 2026, she played the titular role in Aik Aur Pakeezah with Nameer Khan, marking her first television series directed by Kashif Nisar and written by Bee Gul.

== Filmography ==
=== Television ===
Key
†	Denotes television productions that have not yet been released

Year	Title	Role	Network	Notes	Ref
2018	Sanwari	Shama	Hum TV	Debut	
2019	Haqeeqat	Rija	A-Plus TV		
2019	Naqab Zan	Faria	Hum TV		
2020	Main Agar Chup Hoon	Sehrish	Geo Entertainment		
2020	Dikhawa	Saba	Geo Entertainment	Anthology Series	
2020	Mushk	Roshni	Hum TV		
2021	Fasiq	Fatima	Geo Entertainment		
2021	Dikhawa Season 2	Faryal	Geo Entertainment	Anthology Series	
2021	Rang Mahal	Mahpara	Geo Entertainment		
2022	Zakham	Areej	Geo Entertainment		
2022	Farq	Irsa Hassan	Geo Entertainment		
2023	Fairy Tale	Umeed Pasha	Hum TV		
2023	Fairy Tale 2	Umeed Pasha	Hum TV		
2024	Jafaa	Andaleeb "Deebu" Numair	Hum TV		
2024	Tan Man Neel o Neel	Rabia "Rabi" Irum	Hum TV		
2025	Ishq Di Chashni	Rakhshi Butt	Green Entertainment		
2025	Jinn Ki Shadi Unki Shadi	Khushi	Hum TV		
2026	Aik Aur Pakeezah	Pakeezah Bibi	Geo Entertainment		
2026	Munawwara Ka Khadim †	TBA	Hum TV	Filming	

=== Telefilm ===
Year	Title	Role	Network	Ref(s)
2021	Teri Meri Kahani	Zara	Geo Entertainment	
2024	Jori Ban Gayi	Mahrukh	Geo Entertainment	

== Awards and nominations ==
Year	Award	Category	Work	Result	Ref.
2024	9th Hum Awards	Best Actress	Fairy Tale	Nominated	
2024	9th Hum Awards	Best Onscreen Couple (with Hamza Sohail)	Fairy Tale	Won	
2025	10th Hum Awards	Best Actress - Jury	Jafaa	Nominated	
2025	10th Hum Awards	Best Actress - Popular	Jafaa	Nominated	
2025	10th Hum Awards	Best Onscreen Couple - Jury (with Usman Mukhtar)	Jafaa	Nominated	
2025	10th Hum Awards	Best Onscreen Couple - Popular (with Usman Mukhtar)	Jafaa	Nominated	
