= Aik Aur Pakeezah =

Pakistani Drama

- Genre: Drama
- Written by: Bee Gul
- Directed by: Kashif Nisar
- Starring: Sehar Khan; Nameer Khan; Amna Ilyas; Gohar Rasheed; Noor-ul-Hassan; Nadia Afgan; Hina Khawaja Bayat
- Theme music composer: Ukasha Gul Ashraf
- Opening theme: "Aik Aur Pakeezah"
- Country of origin: Pakistan
- Original language: Urdu

Production
- Production companies: Kashf Foundation; 7th Sky Entertainment

Original release
- Network: Geo TV
- Release: 14 January 2026 – April 2026

Aik Aur Pakeezah is a Pakistani television drama series that premiered on Geo TV on 14 January 2026. Written by Bee Gul and directed by Kashif Nisar, the series is produced by Kashf Foundation in collaboration with 7th Sky Entertainment. The series addresses themes of cybercrime, digital privacy, and gender-based social stigma in contemporary Pakistani society.

== Premise ==
The series follows Pakeezah, a young woman whose life is disrupted after a manipulated video of her is circulated online. The incident results in reputational damage and social isolation, drawing attention to the rapid spread of digital content and its consequences. The narrative explores issues including cyber harassment, societal double standards, and the personal consequences of digital exploitation.

== Cast ==
- Sehar Khan as Pakeezah
- Nameer Khan as Faraz
- Amna Ilyas as Barrister Saman
- Gohar Rasheed
- Noor-ul-Hassan
- Nadia Afgan
- Hina Khawaja Bayat
- Umer Darr

== Production ==
The project was developed as a socially focused drama highlighting cybercrime and its psychological and societal impact. Produced by Kashf Foundation, the series was directed by Kashif Nisar from a script by Bee Gul.

== Reception ==
In a review of the first two episodes, Gaitee Ara Siddiqi from The News International praised the series for its storyline, direction, production, and cast performances, noting the layered and nuanced dialogue portrayal of the stigma faced by the protagonist. Sana Hussain of the DAWN Images praised the series for its timely and urgent storytelling, themes, tight pacing, performances of the actors, and impactful dialogues; however, she found the lead pair's occasional lack of emotional connection with the audience and single-dimension in some characters. Laraib Niaz of the Dawn praised the series for highlighting the harsh realities of victim-blaming and the regulation of female conduct in the name of 'izzat'.

However, others debated aspects of its narrative tone and emotional intensity.

== Soundtrack ==
The original score, titled "Aik Aur Pakeezah", was composed by Ukasha Gul Ashraf and released alongside its premiere in January 2026.
