= Shahzad Nawaz =

Actor, singer, and film director

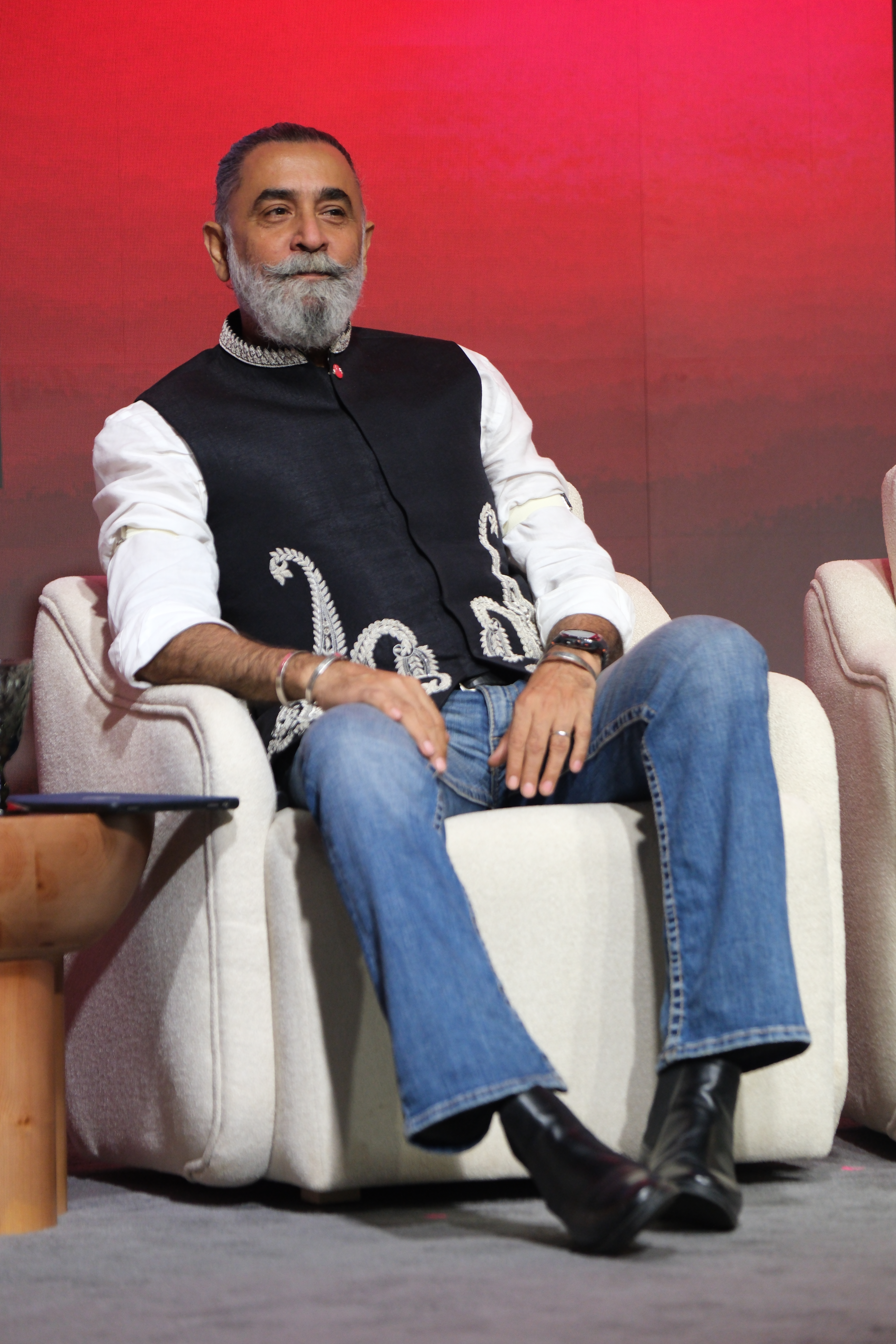
- Born: Karachi, Sindh, Pakistan
- Occupations: Director; Actor; Screenwriter; Art Director; Speaker; Activist
- Relatives: Sehba Akhtar (maternal uncle)
- Musical career
- Genres: Folk Fusion; Classical
- Instrument: Vocals

Shahzad Nawaz is a Pakistani filmmaker and politician. In 2003 and 2005, he directed and acted in two films Daira and Botal Gali, based on an adaptations of Mohsin Hamid book Moth Smoke, and acted in Geo's drama series Ana (2004). Nawaz was noted in the film Chambaili that he wrote and produced. It was the first political film of country, earning him critical appraisal and a nomination ARY Film Award for Best Film as producer. In 2016, he marked his Coke Studio debut as a featured artist in season 9.

In 2025, alongside Atiqa Odho, he represented Pakistan at the Red Sea International Film Festival in Jeddah, Saudi Arabia.

== Early life and family ==
Born and brought up in Karachi, he's a Punjabi whose father's roots are in Chakwal while his mother's ancestral place is Jalandhar, with his family involved both in the military and in the arts: his father was in the Pakistan Navy, his brother is martyr from the Pakistan Air Force, his maternal uncle was famous Urdu poet and film lyricist Sehba Akhtar while his maternal grandfather, Chaudhry Rehmat Ali Rehmat, was a playwright.

== Career ==
=== Actor and director ===
Nawaz ventures int directing with films such as Daira and Botal Gali based on the book Moth Smoke by Mohsin Hamid. He then acted and drama serials Ana (2004) and Ishq Mein Teray (2013). In 2011, Nawaz worked on the script of Chambailli with director Ismail Jilani and it took half and year to complete the screenplay process, in 2012 production began and film released on 26 April 2013 under the banner of Geo Films. Jilani stated that "We wanted to mobilize the people before the elections, We wanted them to come out of the cinema and feel like they wanted to change something". Chambailli grossed Rs 37.8 crore at the box office. At its release, the film surpassed Bollywood's Aashiqui 2 and Hollywood's Oblivion at the Pakistani box office. It was discussed in the national media, and has been praised for its contribution to democracy in Pakistan. Chambaili has been credited with galvanizing non-voters and youth to vote in the 2013 Pakistani general elections, which had a large turnout. Political parties in the country played songs from its soundtrack during campaign rallies, as young people resonated with the film and its music as part of increased social and political activism.

In 2013, he briefly served as a CEO of Nai Baat Media Network. During his advisor tenure he also designed number of TV networks and organizations logos and helped them build a strong market relation including Dunya, Geo, Ary and Nai Baat Media Network.

=== Music ===
In 2016, he marked his Coke Studio debut as a featured artist in season 9. Nawaz has recorded only a narration with singers Javed Bashir and Masoma Anwar, and has expresses to sing in next season.

=== Politics ===
He joined Pak Sarzameen Party in 2016 and did a press conference with Syed Mustafa Kamal.

He was appointed as Special Assistant to Prime Minister (SAPM) Imran Khan on culture, arts and related communications in 2021.

== Filmography ==
=== Films ===
Year	Title	Actor	Screenwriter	Director	Producer	Notes	References
2002	Daira	Yes	Yes		Yes	Adaptation of Mohsin Hamid's novel Moth Smoke (2000)	
2005	Botal Gali	Yes	Yes	Yes			
2013	Chambaili	Yes	Yes		Yes		

=== Television series ===
Year	Title	Role	Network
2004	Ana	Rameen	Geo TV
2013	Ishq Mein Teray	Sheheryar Hamdani	Hum TV
2023	Mein	Asif Khan	ARY Digital
2021	Parizaad	Saith Shehbaz	Hum TV
2022	Badshah Begum	Pir Shah Alam	Hum TV
2026	Doctor Bahu	Dr. Shahnawaz Khan	ARY Digital
2026	Humrahi	Ghazi Yusuf	Geo TV

=== Television shows ===
Year	Title	Role	Network
2019	Coke Studio: Season 9	Himself	Webcast

== Awards and nominations ==
Year	Ceremony	Project	Result	References
2013	ARY Film Award for Best Film	Chambaili	Nominated	
