= Chambaili =

- Theatrical release poster
- چمبیلی; Chambaili: The Fragrance of Freedom
- Directed by: Ismail Jilani
- Written by: Shahzad Nawaz Lyricist = shahzad Nawaz
- Produced by: Abdullah Kadwani; Shahzad Nawaz
- Starring: Mohammed Ehteshamuddin; Khalid Ahmed; Shafqat Cheema; Ghulam Mohiuddin; Salman Peerzada; Maira Khan; Khalid Ahmed; Saiqa; Ali Tahir; Shahzad Nawaz
- Cinematography: Kamran Khan Kami
- Edited by: Farhan Ali Abbasi/ Waqas Ali Khan Viky / ET
- Music by: Najam Sheraz; Shahbaz Khan
- Production company: 7th Sky Entertainment Coup Films
- Distributed by: Geo Films
- Release date: 26 April 2013
- Running time: 135 minutes
- Country: Pakistan
- Language: Urdu
- Box office: Rs. 20 million (US$72,000)

Chambaili (Urdu: چمبیلی) is a 2013 Pakistani Urdu-language political thriller film directed by Ismail Jilani, produced by Abdullah Kadwani and Shahzad Nawaz under the banner of Coup d'état Films and 7th Sky Films. It stars Salmaan Peerzada, Khalid Ahmed, Mohammed Ehteshamuddin, Maira Khan, Shafqat Cheema, Mehreen Syed, Saiqa, Ali Tahir, Khalid Qureshi, Fatima, Humayun Bin Rathor and Shahzad Nawaz. Ghulam Mohiuddin also made a special appearance. Chambaili is a political drama exploring the subject of political corruption. Since the flower 'Chambaili' (jasmine flower) is the national flower of Pakistan, the film-makers' intention was to encourage patriotism and nationalism in Pakistan and they obviously picked this name for a reason.

== Plot ==
The film is a story of a group of friends and their courage, romance and sacrifice at a fateful time. It is set in the fictional city of 'Falakabad' in the country of 'Mulke Khudadad'. In Falakabad, the story revolves around Yaadgaar Colony (an historical district dating to the pre-partition period before 1947).

Mulke Khudadad drifts towards anarchy, civil strife and dark days. Political parties, leaders and lobbies pursue their own agendas. Corruption is at a record high, law and order have deteriorated. Inflation and unemployment are rampant, and intolerance is the order of the day. Deprivation and desperation set the stage for dissent. Confusion and chaos are voiced in the mainstream media, leading to disillusionment. The people wage a daily war for survival, with no time for ideas for the common good of the people.

A group of friends are led by circumstances to try to change the future of the country. They form a political party (Chambaili Tehreek) despite their lack of experience, resources or political background in politics, but their efforts seem doomed. Faced with threats, arrest, cynicism and rejection, electoral reforms give them the impetus to continue. Under the new electoral system, 'Chambaili Tehreek' wins by a wide margin and its elected president gives his "Freedom Speech".

== Cast ==
- Salmaan Peerzada
- Khalid Ahmed
- Maira Khan
- Shafqat Cheema
- Mohammed Ehteshamuddin
- Omair Rana
- Sadia Hayat
- Saiqa
- Ali Tahir
- Khalid Qureshi
- Fatima
- Humayun Bin Rathor
- Shahzad Nawaz
- Ghulam Mohiuddin (special appearance)

== Release ==
The film was released on 26 April 2013 by Geo Films in Pakistan, and grossed Rs 3.78 crore at the box office. At its release, the film surpassed Bollywood's Ashaqui 2 and Hollywood's Oblivion at the Pakistani box office. It was discussed in the national media, and has been praised for its contribution to democracy in Pakistan. Chambaili has been credited with galvanizing non-voters and youth to vote in the 2013 Pakistani general elections, which had a large turnout. Political parties in the country played songs from its soundtrack during campaign rallies, as young people resonated with the film and its music as part of increased social and political activism.

== Music ==
The film's score was composed by Najam Sheraz. Its first music video, for "Dil", was released on Valentine's Day 2013

Chambaili is the first digital Pakistani film. It has the largest number of soundtracks (film songs) so far in the Pakistani film history: 13 songs, of which four have been on the local hit charts. The film has the most music videos of any Pakistani film (eight). An intersection in the Railways Colony in Lahore was named "Chambaili Chowk" after part of the film was shot in the workers colony.
