= Teri Meri Kahani (film) =

2021 Pakistani TV film

- Title screen
- Written by: Saima Akram Chaudhry
- Directed by: Aehsun Talish
- Starring: Haroon Kadwani; Sehar Khan; Bushra Ansari; Usman Peerzada; Jawed Sheikh
- Music by: Wajhi Farooki; Shani Arshad
- Country of origin: Pakistan
- Original language: Urdu

Production
- Producers: Abdullah Kadwani; Asad Qureshi
- Production company: 7th Sky Entertainment

Original release
- Network: Geo TV
- Release: 3 April 2021

Teri Meri Kahani (Urdu: تیری میری کہانی) is a 2021 Pakistani romantic comedy television film produced by Abdullah Kadwani and Asad Qureshi under their production house 7th Sky Entertainment and was premiered on Geo Entertainment. It was written by Saima Akram Chaudhry and directed by Aeshun Talish. Teri Meri Kahani marked the debut of Haroon Kadwani in the lead role along with Sehar Khan, Bushra Ansari, Usmaan Peerzada and Jawed Sheikh.

The television film premiered on 3 April 2021 in Pakistan on Geo TV. The telefilm received countrywide praise for its direction, writing, location, cast and cinematography.

== Plot ==
The film starts with two family friends, Jalaluddin Akbar, and Abdul Qudus. Jalaluddin Akbar is fed up with his perennial underachiever rich spoiled son, Armaan, and is impressed with Abdul Qudus's intelligent, smart daughter who studies in the same college as Armaan. Armaan has a heart full of hatred for Zara as his father always compares the two and praises her as an ideal child. He is intent on exposing Zara as he believes that she cheats by taking notes done by her friend Wafa. Slowly the hatred between the two turns into love.

== Soundtrack ==
Teri Meri Kahani consisted of two original soundtracks called Parchai and Mere Khuda. Parchai is composed and performed by the talented Wajhi Farooki while the lyrics are also written by him along with Honey. Mere Khuda is composed and performed by Shani Arshad while the lyrics are penned down by Sabir Zafar. Both the osts are available on Spotify, Saavn, iTunes, Amazon Music, Gaana and many other similar music streaming platforms. Both the OSTs gained a positive reaction and have garnered 1 million views on YouTube as of June 2021 since its release.

== Reception ==
With its release on 3 April 2021, Teri Meri Kahani was able to get 60 GRPS, the highest amongst its competitors. The film was praised for its acting, storyline, direction, music and production.

== Digital media ==
After the film run on television, Teri Meri Kahani was made available to public through YouTube on Har Pal Geo's official channel. The film garnered six million views within the first week on YouTube.
