= Chand Tara =

- Promotional poster
- Genre: Lighthearted; Romantic comedy
- Created by: Saima Akram Chaudhry
- Directed by: Danish Nawaz
- Starring: Danish Taimoor; Ayeza Khan
- Country of origin: Pakistan
- Original language: Urdu
- No. of episodes: 30

Production
- Producer: Momina Duraid
- Cinematography: Tameen Nizami
- Running time: Approx. 36 minutes
- Production company: MD Productions

Original release
- Network: Hum TV
- Release: 23 March – 21 April 2023

"Chand Tara" is a 2023 lighthearted romantic comedy Pakistani television series, starring real-life couple Danish Taimoor and Ayeza Khan in the lead roles. Written by Saima Akram Chaudhry, directed by Danish Nawaz, and produced by MD Productions, the series began airing from 23 March 2023 during Ramadan on Hum TV, and ended on 21 April 2023 after 30 episodes.

The series was decent but didn't achieve the level of popularity compared to Chaudhry's previous Ramadan scripts. Owing to major problems in the execution of her script, she announced a break from writing Ramadan specials.

== Premise ==
The plot centers around Chand (played by Danish Taimoor), a software engineer who resides in a joint family and desires to live independently, and Tara (played by Ayeza Khan), a gynecologist who was raised alone and longs to be part of a joint family. As their love story unfolds, various situations arise among them and their families, illustrating the chaos of living in a joint family.

== Plot ==
Software engineer Sarim Gulzar (Danish Taimoor) and trainee doctor Naintara Jaffer (Ayeza Khan) like each other and wish to get married. However, Tara's mother Dr. Raazia (Saba Faisal) is against this match since Sarim stays in a joint family and she wants the couple to stay in a nuclear setup. They eventually get married but with a twist. Sarim, who wants to leave his family, promises Dr. Raazia that he will leave the country as soon as they get married. But Naintara makes it clear that she has married Sarim to stay in the lovable environment that a joint family provides because her parents had been separated for many years and she yearned for family bonds. While Tara wants to stay in the joint family, Sarim wants to go away. Added to this is Sarim's sister Mala, cousin Hashir, aunts Safeeha and Mehnaaz, uncles Mateen and Saleem and father Gulzar Ahmed and their quirks. The show follows the conflict between Sarim and Tara with regards to Sarim's family.

== Cast ==
=== Main ===
- Ayeza Khan as Dr. Naintara "Tara" Sarim (nee Jaffer) : Razia and Jaffer's daughter; Sarim's wife.
- Danish Taimoor as Sarim "Chand" Gulzar : Gulzar's son; Shumaila's brother; Tara's husband.

=== Recurring ===
- Saba Faisal as Dr. Razia Jaffer : Tara's mother; Jaffer's wife.
- Behroze Sabzwari as Mir Jaffer : Tara's father; Razia's husband.
- Rehan Sheikh as Gulzar "Babu Bhaiyya" Ahmed : Sarim and Shumaila's father; Manchu and Saleem's brother.
- Danish Nawaz as Mateen "Manchu" Ahmed : Gulzar and Saleem's brother; Mehnaz's husband; Palwasha's father.
- Madiha Iftikhar as Mehnaz "Naaz" Mateen : Manchu's wife; Palwasha's mother.
- Adnan Jaffar as Saleem Ahmed : Gulzar and Manchu's brother; Safeera's husband; Hashir's father.
- Ghazal Siddiqui as Safeera "Saffo" Saleem : Saleem's wife; Hashir's mother.
- Maha Hasan as Roomi Hashir : Hashir's wife.
- Ashir Wajahat as Hashir Saleem : Saleem and Safeera's son; Roomi's husband.
- Mantasha Shahid as Palwasha "Pinky" Mateen : Manchu and Mehnaz's daughter.
- Romaisa Khan as Shumaila "Maala" Gulzar : Gulzar's daughter; Chand's sister.
- Agha Talal as Mohid
- Ayesha Khan
- Syed Afzal
- Fozia Nasir
- Sara Meher
- Ayesha Kamran

== Production ==
On 13 December 2022, Saima Akram Chaudhry announced the title of her new series; she revealed that the series would stand out from her previous collaborations with Danish Nawaz and Momina Duraid, because the main couple would not be not related as cousins or neighbors, and their love story would not begin with fights.

Soon, it was announced that the celebrity couple Danish Taimoor and Ayeza Khan will star in the next Ramadan play. Khan confirmed her presence on 6 February 2023. Romaisa Khan confirmed her presence in January, while Ghazal Siddiqui shared in March that this is her first series after a hiatus of 11 years. Some of the principal character were eliminated after altering the script by the production house due to budget issues.

Cinematography is done by Tameen Nizami. The background score for the series has been given by Wajid Saeed, while the soundtrack of features two songs. (Note: Extracted from YouTube playlist by Hum TV)

Original Soundtrack
No.	Title	Lyrics	Music	Singers	Length
1.	"Chand Tara Shadi Song"	Sami Khan	Sami Khan	Sami Khan, Sara Raza Khan	2:40
2.	"Chand Tara OST"	Ahsan Talish	Naveed Nashad	Rafay Israr, Damia Farooq	3:26
Total length:					6:06

== See also ==
- Chupke Chupke
- Hum Tum
- Mehar Posh
