= Anaa (TV series) =

Pakistani television series

- Also known as: Kainat
- انا
- Written by: Samira Fazal
- Directed by: Shahzad Kashmiri
- Starring: Hania Aamir; Shehzad Sheikh; Naimal Khawar; Usman Mukhtar
- Opening theme: Pyaar Hai Tumse Magar by Sahir Ali Bagga & Hania Aamir
- Ending theme: Haar Se Darr Lagta Hai by Hania Aamir
- Country of origin: Pakistan
- Original language: Urdu
- No. of seasons: 1
- No. of episodes: 30

Production
- Producer: Momina Duraid
- Camera setup: Multi-camera setup
- Production company: MD Productions

Original release
- Network: Hum TV
- Release: 17 February – 8 September 2019

Anaa (Urdu: انا, lit. 'Ego'), previously titled Kainat, is a 2019 Pakistani Urdu language television romantic drama. Produced by Momina Duraid under the banner MD Productions, it stars Shahzad Sheikh, Hania Aamir, Naimal Khawar and Usman Mukhtar. Aamir also made her singing debut, performing the series theme song.

== Plot ==
Daneen, a bold and free‑spirited girl, loves her cousin Areesh, but their families have been bitterly estranged for 25 years due to a tragic incident involving their elders. When Daneen and Areesh decide to marry, Sadia Begum (Areesh’s grandmother) opposes the match because Daneen is the niece of Nazia, the woman she blames for her son Waleed’s suicide.

The truth about the families’ old conflict comes out when Daneen meets Izza, who later discovers she is actually Daneen’s cousin. As relationships unfold, Daneen is forced to choose between Areesh and her family. Heartbroken, she breaks the engagement, and Areesh ends up marrying Anya despite still being in love with Daneen.

Determined to move on, Daneen marries Saif, an older politician, who turns out to be abusive. Meanwhile, Anya and Areesh struggle in their marriage because Areesh’s heart still belongs to Daneen. Izza and Altamash (Anya’s brother) develop feelings for each other despite misunderstandings and family politics.

Nazia manipulates everyone to take revenge on Sadia Begum, causing chaos that pushes Daneen back into Areesh’s orbit. Saif refuses to divorce Daneen, and her life becomes miserable. Areesh eventually tries to rescue her, but Anya and the family intervene, leading to Daneen’s attempted suicide.

As truths unfold—including Anya’s childhood trauma and Nashwa’s crimes—the families finally confront the consequences of years of hatred. Daneen decides to leave Pakistan with her father to rebuild her life. Areesh stays with Anya and their newborn son. In the end, Izza and Altamash overcome misunderstandings and marry. The long-running feud between Shamsher Nagar and Sher Ghar finally ends, and the families reconcile.

== Cast ==
=== Main ===
- Hania Aamir as Daneen Saif (née Sher) - Heiress of Shergarh; Zahid's daughter; Arshad's granddaughter; Areesh's love interest; Saif's wife.
- Shehzad Sheikh as Areesh Ghazanfar - Heir of Shamshernagar; Ghazanfar and Mumtaz's son; Sadia's grandson; Nashwa's brother; Daneen's love interest; Anya's husband.
- Naimal Khawar Abbasi as Izza Khan - Nazia and Azam's daughter; Arshad's granddaughter; Altamash's love interest.
- Usman Mukhtar as Altamash - Anya's brother; Izza's love interest.

=== Supporting ===
- Irfan Khoosat as Arshad Sher - Sadia's brother; Zahid and Nazia's father; Daneen and Izza's grandfather.
- Raju Jamil as Zahid Sher - Arshad's son; Nazia's brother; Daneen's father.
- Tara Mahmood as Nazia Sher - Arshad's daughter; Zahid's sister; Azam's wife; Izza's mother.
- Farhan Ali Agha as Azam Khan - Nazia's husband; Izza's father.
- Muqeet Khan as Kabir - Izza's paternal cousin.
- Alamdar Khan as Saif - Daneen's (former) husband.
- Seemi Raheel as Sadia Begum - Arshad's sister; Ghazanfar and Waleed's mother; Areesh and Nashwa's grandmother.
- Shamil Khan as Ghazanfar - Sadia's son; Mumtaz's husband; Waleed's brother; Areesh and Nashwa's father.
- Javeria Kamran as Nashwa Ghazanfar - Ghazanfar and Mumtaz's daughter; Sadia's granddaughter; Areesh's sister.
- Areeba Shahood as Anya Areesh - Altamash's sister; Areesh's wife.
- Anusheh Aamir as Beena - Altamash's former girlfriend.
- Humayun Khan as Humayun - Guitarist.

== Release ==
The show was also released on YouTube alongside its airing on TV. It became available on iflix after syndication and remained available till late 2019. The show is also available on the Indian streaming platform MX Player.

== Reception ==
Each episode of Anaa has more than 3 million views on YouTube and received 5.6 TRPs at its highest. The sparkling chemistry of Izza and Altamash has been applauded by the masses and has received huge viewership. At the 19th Lux Style Awards, Usman Mukhtar and Naimal Khawar were nominated for Best Emerging Talent for their respective breakthrough performances.

== Accolades ==
Date of ceremony	Award	Category	Recipient(s) and nominee(s)	Result	Ref.
7 February 2020	Pakistan International Screen Awards	Best Television Actress - Critic's choice	Hania Aamir	Nominated	
31 December 2020	Lux Style Awards	Best Emerging Talent	Naimal Khawar	Nominated	
31 December 2020	Lux Style Awards	Best Emerging Talent	Usman Mukhtar	Nominated	

== Production ==
The series had been shot in the scenic locations of Chitral. The series was earlier titled Kainaat but was later changed to Anaa. In an earlier interview with DAWN, Hania Amir talked about her character, "This one has a journey very similar to a lot of individuals out there who own their individuality and their uniqueness and in return are not very much liked for just being themselves".

== Soundtrack ==
Soundtrack album by Sahir Ali Bagga & Hania Aamir
- Released: 14 February 2019
- Recorded: 2019
- Genre: Television soundtrack
- Length: 5:02
- Language: Urdu
- Label: Hum TV

Music video
- Anaa OST on YouTube

The title song was sung by Sahir Ali Bagga & Hania Aamir. The music was composed by Sahir Ali Bagga and the lyrics were written by Imran Raza.
