= Azra Mohyeddin =

Pakistani actress

- Born: Azra Bano Zaidi; Lahore, Pakistan
- Education: University of Lahore
- Occupations: Actress, Singer
- Years active: 1990–present
- Spouse: Zia Mohyeddin (m. 1994; died 2023)
- Children: 1
- Relatives: Khadim Mohyeddin (father-in-law)

Azra Mohyeddin is a Pakistani actress and singer. She is known for her roles in dramas Tum Kon Piya, Do Qadam Door Thay, Yeh Raha Dil, Sanwari, Fasiq and Mohabbat Daagh Ki Soorat.

== Early life ==
Azra was born in Lahore, Pakistan. She completed her studies from University of Lahore.

== Career ==
Azra made her acting debut on PTV in 1990. She was noted for her roles in the dramas Kuch Pyar Ka Pagalpan, Jia Na Jaye, Rehaai, Mujhe Khuda Pe Yaqeen Hai, and Mirat-ul-Uroos. Then she appeared in dramas Khafa Khafa Zindagi, Tum Kon Piya, Do Qadam Door Thay, Aadat, Shanakht and Gohar-e-Nayab. Since then she has appeared in dramas Ramz-e-Ishq, Mohabbat Daagh Ki Soorat, Fasiq and she also in the 2018 movie Na Band Na Baraati.

== Personal life ==
Azra married British-Pakistani actor, producer and director Zia Mohyeddin in 1994. Their daughter Aaliya Mohyeddin was born in 2002.

== Filmography ==
=== Television ===
Year	Title	Role	Network	Ref(s)
2009	Meri Zaat Zarra-e-Benishan	Bibi	Geo Entertainment	
2009	Yeh Kaisi Mohabbat Hai	Chan's mother	Geo Entertainment	
2009	Bol Meri Machli	Maheen's mother	Geo Entertainment	
2009	Buri Aurat	Salma	Geo Entertainment	
2011	Mujhay Roothnay Na Daina	Ammi	Hum TV	
2011	Badtameez	Maryam's mother	ARY Digital	
2011	Takkay Ki Ayegi Baraat	Mehr's friend	Geo Entertainment	
2011	Kuch Pyar Ka Pagalpan	Mujtaba's mother	ARY Digital	
2012	Sargoshi	Amal's mother	Urdu 1	
2012	Mirat-ul-Uroos	Amna	Geo Entertainment	
2013	Rehaai	Nasreen Phoopo	Hum TV	
2013	Nanhi	Tai Ammi	Geo Entertainment	
2013	Mujhe Khuda Pe Yaqeen Hai	Ameena	Hum TV	
2013	Tere Pyar Ke Bharose	Rahat	Express Entertainment	
2013	Ek Kasak Reh Gayi	Amma	Geo Entertainment	
2013	Jia Na Jaye	Eqaan's mother	Hum TV	
2013	Gohar-e-Nayab	Azra	A-Plus	
2014	Jhooti	Nida's mother	Express Entertainment	
2014	Shanakht	Rohaan's mother	Hum TV	
2014	Tum Woh Nahi	Nuzhat	Express Entertainment	
2014	Do Qadam Door Thay	Zohab's mother	Geo Entertainment	
2015	Aatish-e-Ishq	Zaib	Urdu 1	
2015	Aitebaar	Fakhira	Aaj Entertainment	
2016	Izn-e-Rukhsat	Azmat	Geo Entertainment	
2016	Khoat	Naima	ARY Digital	
2016	Tum Kon Piya	Tamkanat Begum	Urdu 1	
2016	Hatheli	Aapa	Hum TV	
2017	Aadat	Nayyar	TV One	
2017	Mohabbat Khawab Safar	Roshan Begum	Hum TV	
2017	Shikwa Nahin Kissi Se	Sonia's mother	A-Plus	
2017	Yeh Raha Dil	Zaki's mother	Hum TV	
2018	Khafa Khafa Zindagi	Bilal's mother	A-Plus	
2018	Tu Jo Nahi	Atiya	TV One	
2018	Tu Ishq Hai	Nazo's mother	Hum TV	
2018	Sanwari	Farri	Hum TV	
2019	Ramz-e-Ishq	Ayesha	Geo Entertainment	
2020	Rockstar	Afreen's mother	TV One	
2021	Makafaat Season 3	Javed's mother	Geo Entertainment	
2021	Dikhawa Season 2	Afaq's mother	Geo Entertainment	
2021	Sitam	Nighat	Hum TV	
2021	Mohabbat Daagh Ki Soorat	Shaista	Geo Entertainment	
2021	Fasiq	Nasreen	Geo Entertainment	
2022	Makafaat Season 4	Kamran's mother	Geo Entertainment	
2022	Bepanah	Fatima's mother	Hum TV	
2022	Zindagi Aik Paheli	Tamanna	Geo Entertainment	
2022	Meri Shehzadi	Hasan's mother	Hum TV	
2023	Makafaat Season 5	Saba's mother	Geo Entertainment	
2023	Maa Nahi Saas Hoon Main	Amma	Geo Entertainment	
2023	Fairy Tale Season 1	Rahat	Hum TV	
2023	Mujhay Qabool Nahin	Shehnaz	Geo Entertainment	
2024	Girhein	Huma	Geo Entertainment	
2024	Aafat	Ishrat	Geo Entertainment	
2025	Umme Ayesha Season 2	Fauzia	Geo Entertainment	
2025	Makafat Season 7	Faizan's mother	Geo Entertainment	
2025	Humraaz	Deeba	Geo Entertainment	
2025	Aik Lafz Zindagi	Asiya	Geo Entertainment	
2025	Baray Bhaiya	Firdous	Geo Entertainment	
2025	Mohra	Aafeen	Geo Entertainment	
2025	Case No 9	Kulsoom	Geo Entertainment	

=== Telefilm ===
Year	Title	Role
2013	Ooper Gori Ka Makaan	Fareeda
2017	Tu Mera Chaand	Dadi

=== Film ===
Year	Title	Role	Reference(s)
2011	Main Tum Aur Imran Hashmi	Shehnaz	
2018	Na Band Na Baraati	Shahid's mother	
2024	The Queen of My Dreams	Worst Auntie	
