= Do Qadam Door Thay =

Pakistani TV series

- Title screen
- Written by: Kifayat Rodani
- Directed by: Mohsin Mirza
- Creative director: Kashif Ahmed Butt
- Starring: Ayeza Khan; Sami Khan; Alyy Khan
- Country of origin: Pakistan
- Original language: Urdu
- No. of episodes: 21

Production
- Production companies: Ironline Productions; KK Entertainment

Original release
- Network: Geo TV
- Release: 3 February – 7 April 2014

Do Qadam Door Thay (Urdu: دو قدم دور تھے; lit. Was Two Steps Away) is an Urdu-language Pakistani social drama serial directed by Mohsin Mirza, written by Kifayat Rodani and produced by Ironline Productions. The drama was first aired 3 February 2014 on Geo TV starring Sami Khan, Aiza Khan, Sana Khan and Ali Khan as lead roles. The drama was superhit from its first episode. It has gained huge appreciation form the India's audience.

It also going to air on Zindagi Channel (India) from 16 February 2016 to 10 March 2016 every Monday to Saturday night 9pm.

== Plot ==
Zohab is the main lead male character and is abducted by Nayab's cousin Raza. Zohab is blindfolded and forced to marry Nayab. The story takes new twists and turns on a speedy pace. Do Qadam Dur Thay is a tale of love affection grief and sorrow, revolving around a married couple and their search for each other. While on the search they bump into one another. They are together for a long time and to make the situation even more dramatic, start developing feelings, not knowing that they are lawfully wedded.

Nayab Iqbal (Aiza Khan), a beautiful young girl, is the daughter of an officer. Since her parents died, her father's middle-class younger brother looks after her as his own daughter, but his second wife treats her like a servant. Nayab's uncle's less educated son Raza (from his first wife) is the only one who treats Nayab with love and care; he silently loves Nayab, but he cannot marry her due to his lower status, while Nayab considers him a brother. One day, Raza realises that his stepmother intends to sell off Nayab to an older man on the pretext of marriage, with that older man being a pimp in reality. He makes a hasty decision to rescue Nayab and himself from this scheming, greedy stepmother. He finds Zohabuddeen (Sami Khan), an educated and wealthy young man managing his family business, to be a suitable life partner for the beautiful and educated Nayab. That very night he gives a bridal dress to Nayab and asks her to be prepared, for they would be leaving soon. Nayab is confused seeing the bridal suit and asks Raza if they would be marrying each other. He does not answer her and rushes off to make preparations. In the dead of the night, Raza and Nayab escape the house.

The next morning, Zohabuddeen, fondly called as Zoab by his doting mother and grandfather, is getting ready to leave for work. While he is on the way, his car is accosted by Raza and his friends and they kidnap him and take him away in their car. Nayab, dressed up in her bridal suit, is waiting in an old small house. Raza arrives there with his friends, qazi sahab and Zoab (who is blindfolded). They remove his blindfold and seat him in a chair, with a gun pointed to his head. Raza goes to fetch Nayab, she is worried if he is doing the right thing, he asks her to have trust in him. Qazi sahab says what they are doing is not right, nikaah should be done with consent of the bride and the groom, and not forcibly. Yet they compel him to do the nikaah. Nayab has covered her head and face with a veil, hence both Nayab and Zoab do not see each other's face. They make Zoab sign the marriage document at gun-point. Once the nikaah is done, qazi sahab is escorted away by Raza's friends. Raza hands the Nikaahnama (the marriage document), along with a letter and some money, to Nayab. And he apologises to Zoab for his misbehaviour and makes Zoab promise him that he would take good care of Nayab, and leaves with his friends.

Zoab is worried that he cannot take this unknown girl home as his mother is a heart patient and cannot take such shocking news. He tries to leave but Nayab holds his hand, while her face is still hidden under the veil. He has no option but to tag her along. Both do not attempt to make a conversation, as Zoab is worried what to do next and Nayab is shy to initiate any talk by herself. They walk out slowly trying to find a way back, Zoab walking ahead and Nayab holding his hand and following. All the while Zoab thinking how to find a solution of this problem, he starts to smoke a cigarette. Struck by a sudden thought, Zoab puts the burning cigarette on Nayab's clutching hand. Due to the sudden pain, she has to let go of his hand and he makes an escape, leaving her alone in the middle of the road. He runs back to his car, and heads to his office. While she removes her veil and looks around for him. She doesn't even know what he looks like, all she knows about him is the name Zohabuddeen. Tired of walking around in that heavy attire, she sits down on the footpath and reads the letter Raza has given her. In the letter, he states that he has loved her since the day he has set his eyes on her, much before her parents' death. And he would have married her himself, but he could not as he was no match for her as she was beautiful and educated, while he was an uneducated poor man with no money or future. So he found her a match that suited her beauty and brains. While he is on his way to Dubai in search of a living. And he has also provided the address and contact details of Zohabuddeen, in the letter.

A beggar woman approaches Nayab and asks for alms. From the money Raza left her, Nayab gives the woman a certain amount and shows her the remaining money, saying that is all she has. The woman advises her not to keep money in open like that, or it could be stolen. Nayab asks the woman if she could help her find a phone to contact her husband. The beggar takes her to the nearest shop with a PCO, where she could make her phone call. But before she could place the call, her money gets snatched away by some local pickpocket, along with Raza's letter and her nikaahnama. And the pickpocket runs away, leaving her empty handed. Nayab asks the beggar woman to take her to her home. The woman takes her to the beggar colony, amidst lewd comments and lustful glances from male beggars. Meanwhile, Zoab talks to his best friend and realises his mistake and goes back to the same spot he had abandoned her, only to find her missing. His friend's talk makes him feel guilty of his action.

Nayab spends the night at the beggar woman's tent. The woman protects Nayab from drunken beggars at night and the next morning requests Nayab to leave as the place is neither suitable for her nor safe. She even gives Nayab some money and a pair of her best clothes given to her by some rich woman. Nayab changes into it and leaves her wedding dress as a gift to the beggar woman for her hospitality. While walking on the streets alone Nayab feels dizzy because of hunger and hires a cab to take her to a hospital. She faints in the cab itself. The cab driver brings her to a clinic, where Dr. Salman (Alyy Khan) shifts her to his house behind his clinic. He is smitten by her beauty and innocence while she lays unconscious. She wakes up and asks him why he has kept her in his house and she wishes to leave. He asks her to stay until her health gets better. As days go by, he makes reasons to make her stay longer, even buys her clothes to wear. She promises to return all his favours, once she is capable enough to.

Zoab's sister visits his home with her kids to find Zoab all cranky and worried, especially at the mention of his marriage. So, his mother and sister plan to call back his cousin Nisha, from London, to cheer him up. Nisha has been in love with Zoab since college, but has been rejected by him time and again so is heartbroken. Yet, she agrees to give a last try. Zoab is rude and arrogant towards Nisha, even after her long absence. His family encourages her to be strong. Once while visiting Zoab at his office, it starts to rain so Nisha pulls Zoab outside to enjoy the rain. Her brother, who turns out to be Dr. Salman, calls her to tell her that he has finally fallen in love and gives the phone to Nayab telling that his sister wishes to speak to her. Nayab takes the call but due to rain the network reception is not quite clear. So, Nisha hand over her phone to Zoab to talk while she dries her hair. Zoab and Nayab have a small, polite conversation.

Dr. Salman proposes marriage to Nayab but she declines saying even if she wants to she cannot accept his proposal, but she does not disclose to him about her marriage. She just says she is in search of someone, and until she finds that person she cannot take any decisions of her life. She requests him to find her a place in Dar-ul-Amaan (women shelter), as she cannot live at his house anymore. Although heartbroken by her rejection, Salman makes arrangements for her to stay at a dar-ul-amaan, where he is a trustee and gives her a reference letter to give at the women shelter. The next morning, Nayab leaves without meeting Salman. Meanwhile, Nisha convinces Zoab to accompany her to Salman's house to meet the girl he has finally found. While Zoab and Nisha are on their way, they encounter Nayab walking with her bag. Zoab driving car rashly sprays Nayab's clothes with mud. Nayab is angry, so Nisha and Zoab get down to apologise to her. They offer to drop her where ever she wishes to go. She asks them to drop her at the dar-ul-amaan. They are surprised as she does not seem to belong to such a place but they still do as she wishes. They drop her and return to Salman's house, to find Salman distraught.

Nayab impresses some woman of Dar ul Amaan and force them to sale handcrafts they made. Nayab herself goes to an office for the sale of the crafts. The office turns out to be of Zoab. He is smitten by her beauty. After a lot of forcing Zaob manages Nayab to work as a nurse for his mother. He then confess that he loves her. Nayab rejects saying that she is married which hurts Zoab. On the other hand, Salman confess to her sister that he loves Nayab. Nayab gets kidnapped due to standing against the management of Daarul Aman. She somehow calls Zoab where she finds out that Zoab is Zohab uddin. Zoab rescues her and brings her back home. Nayab finds their Nikahnama (marriage proof) in Zoab’s drawers and is happy to find him. Nayab starts to get free and close to him since he is husband. Zoab unaware of this feels happy thinking that Nayab loves him and not her husband.

Things get worse when Zoab's mother asks him to send Nayab back since she was kidnapped. Salman discovers that Nayab lives in Zoab's house and reaches there with proposal again but gets disheartened when Zoab confess that he loves Nayab. The decision choice is then given to Nayab to choose between these two. Nayab then hears Zoab's mother point of view about her and leaves. Zoab's mother forces him to marry Nisha. Zoab reaches Darul Aman but Nayab refuses to meet him and asks her friends to lie that she is not here. Zoab heartbroken agrees to his mother while still waiting for Nayab.Suddenly Nayab discovers that she is expecting. Her daarul aman friends and the beggar woman ask her to go back to his husband's house. Nayab then reaches there on wedding of Zoab. She reveals about her marriage to Zoab's mother and grandfather. Nayab then starts to leave but Nisha asks Zoab to stop her and calls of her wedding and leaves with her brother Salman wishing a happy life to Nayab And Zoab. Raza pays a visit to check if Nayab is happy and leaves seeing her happy with Zoab and his family. The show ends with Zoab apologizing to Nayab, and Nayab happily entering his house holding his hand tightly.

== Cast ==
- Ayeza Khan as Nayab Iqbal
- Sami Khan as Zohabuddeen/Zoab
- Alyy Khan as Dr. Salman
- Sukaina Khan as Roseena
- Kunwar Arsalan as Raza (Nayab's Cousin)
- Qavi Khan as Zohab's Grandfather
- Sana Khan as Neesha
- Azra Mohyeddin as Zohab's Mother
- Ambar Arshad
- Anum Aqeel
- Fareeha Jabeen as Sultana

== Music ==
The original sound track is produced by Ironline productions and KK Entertainment for Geo TV, sung by Nida Arab and Nabeel Shaukat Ali, the winner of Sur Kshetra and the singer of hit OSTs Darmiyan, Shukk, Pachtawa and Zindagi tere bina. This OST is composed by Waqar Ali.
