= Mujhe Khuda Pe Yaqeen Hai =

- Genre: Social; Drama
- Created by: Barkat Siddiqui
- Based on: Mujhe Khuda Pe Yakeen Hai by Seema Munaf/Atiya Dawood
- Starring: Ahsan Khan (actor); Ayesha Khan; Mikaal Zulfiqar; Momal Sheikh; Talat Hussain; Samra Arsalan; Shakeel; Sajida Syed; Raju Jamil; Azra Mohyeddin
- Composer: Raheel Fayyaz
- Country of origin: Pakistan
- Original language: Urdu
- No. of seasons: 1
- No. of episodes: 22

Production
- Running time: 35–43 minutes

Original release
- Network: HUM TV
- Release: 13 August 2013 – 7 January 2014

Mujhe Khuda Pe Yaqeen Hai (I have faith in God) is a Pakistani drama serial, starring Ahsan Khan, Ayesha Khan, Momal Sheikh and Mikaal Zulfiqar airing on Hum TV released on 13 August 2013. The serial is directed by Barkat Siddiqui and written by Seema Munaf and Atiya Dawood.

== Description ==
The story revolves around four characters; Arham whose unknown transgression has cut him off from the rest of the family, his older brother Shaiq who doesn't seem to be interested in his newlywed wife, Narmeen who is also a very grey-shaded character and holds mysteries herself, Areeba is the most genuine and helps bring Arham back out of his miseries.

== Synopsis ==
The story of "Mujhe Khuda Pey Yakeen hai" revolves around Arham, Areeba, Narmeen and Shahiq. The selfish, greedy and cunning Narmeen gets engaged to Arham, conning him into believing she is in love with him until she comes across Shahiq, Arham's brother who has completed his MBA from America and has now returned to Pakistan. Instantly she begins to regret her move and makes a false accusation against Arham so that her engagement can be broken off, after which she successfully marries Shahiq. Just when Arham, who has become a culprit in his family's eyes begins to get fed up with his circumstances, his sister's friend, Areeba, tries to become a part of his life, igniting Narmeen's jealousy.

== Accolades ==
Year	Awards	Category	Nominee(s)/ recipient(s)	Result	Ref.
4 December 2014	Lux Style Awards	Best Original Soundtrack	Promax Media	Nominated	

== Cast ==
- Ahsan Khan as Arham
- Ayesha Khan as Narmeen
- Mikaal Zulfiqar as Shaiq
- Momal Sheikh as Areeba
- Talat Hussain as Irshad
- Ayesha Khan as Shazia
- Samra Arsalan as Sara
- Shakeel as Shakeel
- Sajida Syed as Saman
- Raju Jamil as Saif
- Azra Mohyeddin as Ameena
