= Fasiq (TV series) =

Pakistani television series

- Fasiq Poster
- Genre: Romantic; Tragedy; Family
- Written by: Huma Hina Nafees
- Directed by: Saleem Ghanchi
- Starring: Sehar Khan; Adeel Chaudhry; Haroon Shahid; Sukaina Khan
- Country of origin: Pakistan
- Original language: Urdu
- No. of episodes: 106

Production
- Producers: Abdullah Kadwani; Asad Qureshi
- Running time: 35-40 minutes
- Production company: 7th Sky Entertainment

Original release
- Network: Geo Entertainment
- Release: 23 November 2021 – 9 March 2022

Fasiq (Urdu: فاسق, lit. 'Sinner') is a 2021 Pakistani television series, directed by Saleem Ghanchi and written by Huma Hina Nafees. It is produced by Abdullah Kadwani and Asad Qureshi under their banner 7th Sky Entertainment. It premiered on 23 November 2021 on Geo TV. It stars Sehar Khan, Adeel Chaudhry, Haroon Shahid, and Sukaina Khan in the leading roles.

== Cast ==
=== Main cast ===
- Sehar Khan as Fatima (Mutahir's 1st wife, later married Umair)
- Adeel Chaudhry as Mutahir
- Haroon Shahid as Umair
- Sukaina Khan as Aneeqa (Mutahir's 2nd wife)

=== Recurring cast ===
- Mohsin Gilani as Mansoor (Umair's father)
- Tariq Jamil as Shafeeq (Fatima's father)
- Hira Tareen as Sawera (Mutahir's 3rd wife)
- Azra Mohyeddin as Nasreen (Umair's mother)
- Sabiha Hashmi as Amna (Sawera's mother)
- Beena Chaudhary as Saima (Mutahir's mother)
- Sadaf Aashan as Sultana (Anika's mother)

== Release ==
The teasers of the serial were aired on 18 November 2021, prior to its television premiere. On 18 November 2021, it was revealed to air from 23 November. The show is being aired from Monday to Sunday at 9:00 PM PST.
