= Jafaa (TV series) =

2024 Pakistani television series

- Genre: Romantic; Drama
- Written by: Samira Fazal
- Directed by: Danish Nawaz
- Starring: Mawra Hocane; Sehar Khan; Usman Mukhtar; Mohib Mirza
- Opening theme: Jafaa by Shafqat Amanat Ali
- Country of origin: Pakistan
- Original language: Urdu
- No. of seasons: 1
- No. of episodes: 32

Production
- Producer: Momina Duraid
- Production locations: Islamabad, Pakistan
- Camera setup: Multi-camera setup
- Running time: 38–45 minutes
- Production company: MD Productions

Original release
- Network: Hum TV
- Release: 24 May – 27 December 2024

Jafaa (Urdu: جفا, lit. 'Tyranny') is a 2024 Pakistani drama television series written by Samira Fazal and directed by Danish Nawaz. Produced by Momina Duraid under the banner MD Productions, the series aired on 24 May 2024. It stars Mawra Hocane, Sehar Khan, Usman Mukhtar and Mohib Mirza. The series revolves around two cousins who face a range of emotions and mental struggle after their marriages.

The series received high ratings and significant digital viewership. It garnered mixed reviews from critics, with praise for Hocane's performance but criticism for its depiction of sensitive themes.

== Plot ==
The story revolves around a college student, Andaleeb, and a gynecologist Dr. Zara. Andaleeb is deeply connected to her father. Andaleeb's secret relationship with her classmate Moiz blossoms, but they face obstacles due to classism, leading to their separation when her mother arranges a suitable match for her, despite her father's support for her and Moiz being together.

Meanwhile, the newlywed Dr. Zara struggles to understand her husband Hassan, only to discover his behaviour of gaslighting and emotional abuse. As she harbors secrets, her situation escalates to physical abuse. Zara decides to leave him, but later learns about his traumatic past. Despite her efforts, Hassan's behavior worsens, and Zara is hospitalized due to domestic violence.

Andaleeb's parents arrange her marriage to Dr. Numair, Zara's friend and an oncologist. Their relationship develops slowly, as Numair learns about Andaleeb's past affair with Moiz. The age difference of couple and the constant pressure to plan a baby by Numair's mother create tension. When Numair discovers he has azoospermia, it strains their relationship further.

== Cast ==
=== Main ===
- Mawra Hocane as Dr. Zara Saleem (formerly Hassan): Gynecologist; Saleem and Tayyaba's daughter; Andaleeb's cousin; Hassan's ex wife
- Sehar Khan as Andaleeb "Deebu" Numair (nee Jamal): Jamal and Sadia's daughter; Zara's cousin; Numair's wife; Anadil's mother
- Usman Mukhtar as Dr. Numair Ansari : Oncologist; Maria's son; Nimra's brother; Andaleeb's husband; Anadil's father
- Mohib Mirza as Hassan Ahsan : Nazia and Ahsan's son; Zara's ex husband

=== Recurring ===
- Farah Sadia as Tayyaba Saleem: Saleem's wife; Zara's mother; Sadia's sister
- Shamil Khan as Saleem : Tayyaba's husband; Zara' s father
- Nauman Masood as Jamal: Sadia's husband; Andaleeb father; Anadil's maternal grandfather
- Nadia Afgan as Sadia Jamal: Jamal's wife; Andaleeb's mother; Tayyaba's sister; Anadil's maternal grandmother
- Laila Zuberi as Maria Ansari : Nimra and Numair's mother; Anadil's paternal grandmother
- Anam Goher as Nimra Faraz (nee Ansari) : Maria's daughter; Numair's sister; Anadil's paternal aunt; Faraz's wife
- Zarrar Khan as Moiz: Andaleeb's former lover
- Saima Kanwal as Amma : Saleem's mother; Zara's grandmother
- Azra Mansoor as Daado : Ahsan's mother; Hassan's grandmother
- Arjumand Rahim as Nazia: Ahsan's ex wife; Hassan's mother
- Saife Hassan as Ahsan : Nazia's ex husband; Hassan's father
- Rubina Naz as Moiz's mother
- Tauseeq Haider as Zara's therapist
- Shahbaz Shigri as Dr. Sameer : Zara's colleague

== Production ==
Principal photography commenced in Islamabad in November 2023. Hocane returned to the set in April 2024, after completing another project. She described her character as a gynecologist who navigates high-pressure situations in her marital life. Meanwhile, Mukhtar confirmed his involvement in the project, portraying an oncologist.

== Reception ==
=== Audience reception ===
The series became one of the most-watched television series of Pakistan in 2024, and garnered high ratings, peaking at 7-8 in its finale episodes. The series garnered significant digital viewership and trended extensively on YouTube in India and Pakistan.

=== Critical reception ===
A critic from the DAWN Images positively reviewed the series, while noticing its multiple themes. A reviewer from The Express Tribune criticised the depiction of suicide without seeking counseling, sending a potentially harmful message to vulnerable viewers, however director Danish Nawaz argued that the attempted suicide shows the repercussions of forced marriage, emphasized that ending one's life isn't easy. Zainab Mossadiq of the DAWN Images praised the sensitive portrayal of social issues and strong relationships, but criticizes its handling of male fertility issues, absurd storyline, and abrupt ending. Sarah Brobi of the Aaj News praised the series for effectively portrays the plight of characters trapped in forced marriages, advocating for transparency and individual choice. However, the narrative is marred by unnecessary plot points, such as Numair's infertility, and a dragged-out conclusion that undermines the story's core message.
