= Tauseeq Haider =

Pakistani anchor and actor

- توثیق حیدر
- Born: Rawalpindi, Punjab, Pakistan
- Citizenship: Pakistan
- Occupations: Radio and TV presenter
- Years active: 1987 – Present
- Television: Pakistan Television
- Awards: Superstar Award 2022 by Radio Pakistan at its diamond jubilee event in 2022

Tauseeq Haider is a Pakistani radio and television anchor, show host, and actor. He has the honour of being the first voice to be aired on FM Radio in Pakistan. Currently, he anchors a morning show "Rising Pakistan" on PTV Home. Since 2005, he is the CEO and founder of Black Box Sounds. He has directed documentary The Story of a Banyan Tree.

== Life and career ==
He started his career as an English newscaster at Radio Pakistan in 1987. He has also read English News at PTV. When Radio Pakistan experimentally started its FM channel in 1993, he was the first anchor to be aired on it. Later, he presented many programs on radio and hosted several talk shows on Pakistan Television. Presently, he is anchoring a morning show "Rising Pakistan" at PTV home.

He also works as a public communication trainer and attended a training workshop on "How to become a good Compere / Presenter", held in March 2022 at Pakistan Broadcasting Academy, Islamabad.

In 2022, Tauseeq has been cast in a forthcoming Turkish drama Koyu Beyaz along with actress Atiqa Odho.

== Filmography ==
Year	Title	Role	Network
1997	Mahrukh	Sultan	PTV
1999	Parchain		NTM
2020	The Story of a Banyan Tree	Director	Documentary
2022	Rising Pakistan	Host (morning show)	PTV
2024	Kabhi Main Kabhi Tum	Murtaza	ARY Digital
2024	Jafaa	Zara's therapist	Hum TV
2024	Meem Se Mohabbat	Suleman Salahuddin	Hum TV
2025	Ishq Di Chashni	Eshan Butt	Green Entertainment
2025	Behroopia	Qasim Raja	Green Entertainment
2025	Main Zameen Tu Aasmaan	Ahmed	Green Entertainment
2026	Shaidai	Ahmed	Geo Entertainment

== Awards and recognition ==
In August 2022, Tauseeq was honored by Radio Pakistan with Superstar Award on occasion of the diamond jubilee Awards 2022 ceremony.
