= Hira Tareen =

Pakistani model and actress

- Born: Hira Tareen; Karachi, Sindh, Pakistan
- Occupations: Actress; model
- Spouse: Ali Safina (m. 2013)
- Children: 1
- Relatives: Zara Tareen (sister)

Hira Tareen (born 1982) is a Pakistani model and actress. Her TV appearances include Mohabat Subh Ka Sitara Hai, Goya, Tum Kon Piya, Khuda Mera Bhi Hai, Khaas, Zard Zamano Ka Sawera and Choti Choti Batain. She has also appeared in the 2013 film Seedlings.

== Personal life ==
Hira Tareen is the sister of model, actor and photographer, Zara Tareen. She married actor Ali Safina in 2013. They welcomed a daughter in December 2017.

== Filmography ==
=== Film ===
Year	Title	Role	Notes
2013	Behadd	Shaista	
2013	Seedlings		

=== Television ===
Year	Title	Role	Notes
2012	Manjali	Rameen	Geo TV
2013	Mohabat Subh Ka Sitara Hai	Hamna	Hum TV
2015	Mohabbat Ho Gayee Hai Tumse	Naziya	TV One
2016	Goya	Zahra	Ary Digital
2016	Tum Kon Piya	Sumbul	Urdu1
2016	Khuda Mera Bhi Hai	Kashmala	ARY Digital
2017	Zard Zamanon Ka Sawera	Sajjal	ARY Digital
2017	Baaghi	Herself	Urdu 1
2019	Khaas	Salma	Hum TV
2019	Choti Choti Batain	Nadia	Hum TV
2019	Piya Naam Ka Diya	Roshanay	Geo Tv
2021	Fasiq	Sawera	Geo Tv
2023	Hasrat		Geo Tv
2023	Mere Ban Jao	Nadira	Hum TV
2023	Ishq Murshid	Mehreen	Hum TV
2025	Goonj	Zartash	
