= Usman Mukhtar =

Pakistani actor and director (born 1985)

- Born: Usman Mukhtar; 27 July 1985 (age 41); Rawalpindi, Punjab, Pakistan
- Occupation: Actor • Director
- Years active: 2006–present
- Spouse: Zunaira Inam Khan (m. 2021)

Usman Mukhtar (Urdu: عثمان مختار) (born 27 July 1985) is a Pakistani actor, director, producer and cinematographer.

== Early and personal life ==
Mukhtar was born in Rawalpindi on 27 July 1985, to actress Nasira, who has acted in 158 films and was known for her roles as a villain, while his grandfather was a lawyer.

Because his family did not support his desire to become a movie director, he studied journalism instead of going to a film school.

At one point, he also wanted to become a professional cricketer, but there too his family dissuaded him.

Mukhtar married Zunaira Inam Khan in an intimate nikkah ceremony in April 2021. They have a daughter, who was born on February 23, 2025.

== Career ==
=== Director ===
Mukhtar began his career as a filmmaker in 2006, mostly directing music videos.

In June 2022, he released Gulabo Rani, a horror short film that was well received, winning the Best Short Film Award at the 2022 Los Angeles Sci-Fi & Horror Festival.

=== Actor ===
Mukhtar began his acting career with theatre in 2007, featuring in plays.

In 2016, Mukhtar got his break as a film actor with a secondary role in Janaan.

In 2018, he had another secondary role in Parchi, for which he was also the cinematographer.

In 2019, Mukhtar starred in the Hum TV drama Anaa opposite to Naimal Khawar, written by Samira Fazal and directed by Shahzad Kashmiri, which marked his acting debut on television as well his first lead role.

In 2020, Mukhtar hosted the Hum Style Awards. He played the role of "Dr. Haris" in another Hum TV drama called Sabaat opposite to Sarah Khan.

In 2021, he starred in the drama serial Sinf-e-Aahan. The same year he was cast and played the role of Aswad in drama serial Hum Kahan Ke Sachay Thay alongside Mahira Khan and Kubra Khan, written by Umera Ahmad.

=== Producer ===
In April 2022, he became a producer after launching Eastern Terrestrial (ET) Studios with actor Meiraj Haq, the production house aiming to discover and help new talent.

== Filmography ==
=== Short films ===
Year	Title	Director	Actor	Producer	Notes
2012	Black Coffee	Yes	No	No	
2013	Waking Dead	Yes	No	No	
2021	Bench	Yes	Hasan	Yes	
2022	Aik To Tum Aurtain	No	Faheem	No	
2022	Gulabo Rani	Yes	No	Yes	

=== Films ===
Year	Film	Role	Director	Notes
2016	Janaan	Samir	Azfar Jafri	Debut film; cameo
2018	Parchi	Bilal	Azfar Jafri	Also cinematographer
2023	Chikkar	SSP Sarmad Zaman	Zaheer Uddin Ahmed	
2024	Umro Ayyar - A New Beginning	Amar	Azfar Jafri	

=== Television ===
Year	Title	Role	Channel	Notes	Ref(s)
2019	Anaa	Altamash	Hum TV	TV Debut	
2020	Sabaat	Dr. Haris	Hum TV		
2021	Hum Kahan Ke Sachay Thay	Aswad Ayyub	Hum TV		
2021	Sinf-e-Aahan	Daniyal	ARY Digital		
2024	Jafaa	Dr. Numair	Hum TV		
2025	Pamaal	Raza Haseeb	Green Entertainment		
2025	Muamma	Shah Jahan	Hum TV		

== Awards and nominations ==
Year	Award	Category	Project	Result	Ref(s)
2013	1st Hum Awards	Hum Award for Best Music Video	Par Mein Hoon Ruka Sa by Abbas Ali Khan	Nominated	
2014	2nd Hum Awards	Hum Award for Best Music Video	Kyun Gayi by Farhan Saeed	Nominated	
2020	19th Lux Style Awards	Best Emerging Talent in Television	Anaa	Nominated	
2022	8th Hum Awards	Best Actor - Popular	Hum Kahan Ke Sachay Thay	Nominated	
2022	8th Hum Awards	Best Actor - Jury	Hum Kahan Ke Sachay Thay	Nominated	
2022	8th Hum Awards	Best Onscreen Couple - Popular (with Mahira Khan)	Hum Kahan Ke Sachay Thay	Nominated	
2022	8th Hum Awards	Best Onscreen Couple - Jury (with Mahira Khan)	Hum Kahan Ke Sachay Thay	Nominated	
2025	10th Hum Awards	Best Actor - Popular	Jafaa	Nominated	
2025	10th Hum Awards	Best Actor - Jury	Jafaa	Nominated	
2025	10th Hum Awards	Best Onscreen Couple - Popular (with Sehar Khan)	Jafaa	Nominated	
2025	10th Hum Awards	Best Onscreen Couple - Jury (with Sehar Khan)	Jafaa	Nominated	
