= Dil Tera Hogaya =

- Official poster
- Genre: Drama; Comedy; Romance
- Written by: Saima Akram Chudhery
- Directed by: Aehsun Talish
- Starring: Feroze Khan; Zara Noor Abbas
- Country of origin: Pakistan
- Original language: Urdu

Production
- Producers: Abdullah Kadwani; Asad Qureshi
- Running time: 84 minutes
- Production company: 7th Sky Entertainment

Original release
- Network: Geo Entertainment
- Release: 31 July 2020

Dil Tera Ho Gaya (English: Heart Is Now Yours) is a 2020 Pakistani film directed by Aehsun Talish, written by Saima Akram Chaudhry and produced by Abdullah Kadwani under the 7th Sky Entertainment banner. The film stars Feroze Khan and Zara Noor Abbas. It was released in July 2020 as part of Geo Entertainment's Eid programming.

== Cast ==
- Feroze Khan as Anas Ahmad; Ahmad & Fehmida's son; Roma's Cousin & Husband; Arshad & Zubaida's Nephew & Son-in-law
- Zara Noor Abbas as Roma Arshad; Arshad & Zubaida's daughter; Anas's Cousin & Wife; Ahmad & Fehmida's Niece & Daughter-in-law
- Saba Faisal as Fehmi/Fehmida; Ahmad's Wife & Anas's mother; Arshad & Zubaida's Sister-in-law, Roma's Aunt & Mother-in-law
- Jawed Sheikh as Ahmad; Fehmida's husband & Anas's father; Arshad's elder brother & Zubaida's brother-in-law; Roma's Uncle & father-in-law
- Shaheen Khan as Zoobi/Zubaida; Arshad's wife & Roma's mother; Ahmad & Fehmida's Sister-in-law, Anas's Aunt & Mother-in-law
- Farhan Ali Agha as Roma's father; Zubaida's husband & Roma's father; Arshad's younger brother & Fehmida's brother-in-law; Anas's Uncle & father-in-law
- Mizna Waqas as Chanda; Maid

== Digital media ==
The telefilm was released digitally on the TV channel's official YouTube channel. It was also made available on Amazone prime video after its release on television.
