= Goya (TV series) =

- Genre: Family drama Romantic drama
- Written by: Syed Mohammad Ahmed
- Directed by: Farrukh Faiz
- Starring: Sana Javed; Osman Khalid Butt
- Country of origin: Pakistan
- Original language: Urdu
- No. of seasons: 1
- No. of episodes: 33

Production
- Camera setup: Multi-camera setup

Original release
- Network: ARY Digital
- Release: 15 November 2014 – 17 April 2015

Goya is a Pakistani drama serial that first aired on ARY Digital in 2015. It was written by Syed Mohammad Ahmed, produced by Humayun Saeed, Shehzad Nasib and directed by Farrukh Faiz. It features Sana Javed and Osman Khalid Butt as the leads.

== Synopsis ==
Rahat Hashmi is a powerful and wealthy man whose word is law for his son, Omar. Rahat wants his son to even stand and sit per his wishes but things take a turn when Omar meets a local reporter, Mohini, and falls for her.

== Cast ==
- Sana Javed as Mohini
- Osman Khalid Butt as Omar
- Farah Shah as Asma
- Furqan Qureshi as Ali
- Usman Peerzada as Rahat Hashmi
- Tara Mahmood as Omar's mother
- Shamim Hilaly as Mrs. Imtiaz
- Gohar Rasheed as Umer
- Hira Tareen as Zara
- Asad Siddiqui
