= Hamza Sohail =

Pakistani actor (born 1996)

- Born: 16 July 1996 (age 30); Lahore, Punjab, Pakistan
- Education: Coventry University
- Occupation: Actor
- Years active: 2021–present
- Parent: Sohail Ahmad (father)

Hamza Sohail (born 16 July 1996) is a Pakistani actor who works primarily for Pakistan television. The son of senior actor and comedian Sohail Ahmad, he made his acting debut with the drama serial Raqeeb Se (2021). He is known for starring in comedy drama Fairy Tale (2023), and the social drama Zard Patton Ka Bunn (2024). He won the Hum Award for Best Actor Popular for Fairy Tale Season 2 (2023).

== Early life and education ==
Sohail is the elder son of veteran stage actor and comedian Sohail Ahmed. He completed his early education from Beaconhouse School System in Lahore. Later, he earned his MBA from London.

== Career ==
Sohail returned to Lahore to pursue an acting career, where he met TV director Kashif Nisar. Nisar cast Sohail in his 2021 drama Raqeeb Se. He then appeared in the drama Main Haari Piya. Sohail's first web series was Mrs. & Mr. Shameem, where he worked alongside Saba Qamar and Nauman Ijaz. He also worked in the drama Badshah Begum with Zara Noor Abbas, Ali Rehman Khan, and Komal Meer.

In 2023, Sohail gained recognition in the Ramadan special romantic-comedy Fairy Tale with Sehar Khan, and later appeared in its sequel. For the series, Sohail received praise for his on-screen chemistry with Khan. In 2024, Sohail played the lead role of a doctor appointed to a remote rural area in Zard Patton Ka Bunn and completed Burns Road Kay Romeo Juliet with Iqra Aziz. Additionally, Sohail has acted in the drama Sirf Tum. In 2025 he appeared in Dil Wali Gali Mein, a Ramadan series, on Hum TV.

== Filmography ==
=== Television ===
Key
†	Denotes television productions that have not yet been released

Year	Title	Role	Network	Director	Notes	Ref.
2021	Raqeeb Se	Abdul Rahman	Hum TV	Kashif Nisar	Supporting role	
2021	Main Haari Piya	Saud	ARY Digital	Badar Mehmood	Supporting role	
2022	Badshah Begum	Pir Shahmir	Hum TV	Khizer Idrees	Supporting role	
2023	Fairy Tale 1	Farjaad Khan	Hum TV	Ali Hassan		
2023	Fairy Tale 2	Farjaad Khan	Hum TV	Ali Hassan		
2023	Sirf Tum	Hannan Ijaz	Geo Entertainment	Mazhar Moin		
2023	Breaking News	Hussain	Green Entertainment	Kashif Nisar		
2024	Burns Road Kay Romeo Juliet	Farhaad Yakub Karim Baksh	ARY Digital	Fajr Raza		
2024	Zard Patton Ka Bunn	Dr. Naufil	Hum TV	Saife Hasan		
2025	Dil Wali Gali Mein	Mujtaba "Mujji" Ahmed Siddiqui	Hum TV	Kashif Nisar		
2026	Dekh Zara Pyar Se	Zoraiz Ali Khan	Hum TV	Ali Hassan		
2026	Munawwara Ka Khadim †	Jawad	Hum TV	Shehzad Kashmiri	Filming	

=== Web Series ===
Year	Title	Role	Network	Director	Ref(s)
2022	Mrs. & Mr. Shameem	Ali	ZEE5	Kashif Nisar	

== Awards and nominations ==
Year	Award	Category	Nominated work	Result	Ref(s)
2024	9th Hum Awards	Best Actor	Fairy Tale	Won	
2024	9th Hum Awards	Best On-screen Couple Popular (with Sehar Khan)	Fairy Tale	Won	
2025	10th Hum Awards	Best Actor - Popular	Zard Patton Ka Bunn	Nominated	
2025	10th Hum Awards	Best Actor - Jury	Zard Patton Ka Bunn	Nominated	
2025	10th Hum Awards	Best On-screen Couple - Popular (with Sajal Aly)	Zard Patton Ka Bunn	Nominated	
2025	10th Hum Awards	Best On-screen Couple - Jury (with Sajal Aly)	Zard Patton Ka Bunn	Nominated	
2025	2nd Sukooon Kya Drama Hai Icon Awards	Best Actor (Critics’ Choice)	Zard Patton Ka Bunn	Nominated	
2025	2nd Sukooon Kya Drama Hai Icon Awards	Best Actor (Popular Choice)	Zard Patton Ka Bunn	Nominated	
2026	3rd Pakistan International Screen Awards	Best On-screen Couple (with Sajal Aly)	Zard Patton Ka Bunn	Nominated	
