= Adnan Jaffar =

Pakistani actor

- Education: Arizona State University; National Academy of Performing Arts
- Occupation: Actor
- Years active: 2012–present
- Spouse: Farheen Zehra Jaffar (m. 2009)

Adnan Jaffar (Urdu: عدنان جعفر) is a Pakistani actor and former anchor from Karachi.

He is known for his work in the film and television industry and theatre in Pakistan.

== Early life and education ==
Adnan began his career after attending National Academy of Performing Arts (NAPA) and Arizona State University.

A mass communication graduate, before taking on acting, he was for some time a broadcast journalist for Dawn News.

== Career ==
=== Theatre ===
After attending NAPA, where Khalid Ahmed was his voice teacher, Adnan got his breakthrough as a stage actor when he was cast in Oedipus Rex, a play directed by Zia Mohyeddin.

=== Television ===
Adnan made his television debut in 2012 and is well known for his roles in projects such as Coke Kahani (2012), Behadd (2013), Jackson Heights (2014), Jo Bichar Gaye (2021–2022) and Hum Tum (2022).

=== Films ===
He made his film debut in 2015 with Jalaibee followed by Manto (2015), Moor (2015) and Jeewan Hathi (2016). He also appeared in Chupan Chupai (2017), Parwaaz Hay Junoon (2017) and Project Ghazi (2018).

== Filmography ==
=== Television ===
Year	Title	Role	Notes
2012	Mera Saaein 2	Naina's son	
2012	New York Se New Karachi	Kifayat	
2012	Coke Kahani	Jugnoo	
2012–13	Baandi	Inspector Hassan	
2012–13	Talkhiyan	Janu Baba	
2013	Aunn Zara	Jamshed	
2013	Behadd	Shafaq's husband	Telefilm; cameo
2014–15	Jackson Heights	Rizwan	
2015	Mol	Rohail Hayat	
2015	Khilona	Daniyal	
2015	Farwa Ki ABC	Mustansar	
2016	Lagao	Abeer	
2017	Yeh Raha Dil	Jimmy	
2018	Laal	Zarminay's father	Telefilm
2019–20	Daasi	Touqeer	
2019–20	Ruswai	Dr. Feroze	
2020	Homeland	General Aziz	American TV series; cameo
2020-21	Chalawa	Professor Faraz Hamdani	
2021	Dhoop Ki Deewar	Cap. Sher Ali	Web series
2021–22	Ek Jhoota Lafz Mohabbat		
2021–22	Bebaak	Waqar	
2021–22	Jo Bichar Gaye	Col A. Fakhruddin	
2022	Hum Tum	Professor Qutub ud Din	
2022	Mor Moharan	Nawab Feroze	
2022	Aik Sitam Aur	Furqan	
2022–23	Tinkay Ka Sahara	Salman	
2023	Chand Tara	Saleem	
2023–24	Ishq Murshid	Haroon Baig	
2024	Radd	Zamin Shah	
2025	Meri Zindagi Hai Tu	Sohail	

=== Films ===
Year	Title	Role	Notes	Ref.
2015	Jalaibee	Dara	Film debut	
2015	Manto	Qudrat Ullah Shahab		
2016	Jeewan Hathi	Farhan		
2016	Orphic		Short film	
2017	Chupan Chupai	Chaudhary (Policeman)		
2017	Parwaaz Hai Junoon	OC Flying Taimoor		
2018	Project Ghazi	Qataan		
2018	Chotay Shah	Mohammad Asghar	Telefilm	
2018	Altered Skin	Lab infected		
2019	Pinky Memsaab	Hassan Chugtai		
2022	Intezaar	Sameer		
