= Fairy Tale (Pakistani TV series) =

Pakistani Television series

- Genre: Comedy; Lighthearted; Romance
- Written by: Sarah Majeed
- Directed by: Ali Hassan
- Starring: Sehar Khan; Hamza Sohail; Aena Khan; Adnan Raza Mir
- Opening theme: "Tere Hawale" by Sibtain Khalid, Adrian David & Nish Asher
- Composer: Adrian David Emmanuel
- Country of origin: Pakistan
- Original language: Urdu
- No. of seasons: 2
- No. of episodes: 47

Production
- Producer: Momina Duraid
- Running time: Season 1 : 40 minutes Season 2 : 80 minutes
- Production company: MD Productions

Original release
- Network: Hum TV
- Release: 23 March – 25 November 2023

Fairy Tale is a 2023 Pakistani romantic comedy television series starring Sehar Khan and Hamza Sohail. Written by Sarah Majeed and directed by Ali Hasan, the series was produced by Momina Duraid under MD Productions. It consists of two seasons, with the first season airing on Hum TV from March to April 2023 and the second from August to November 2023.

== Plot ==
=== Season 1 ===
Umeed Pasha, a young middle-class woman seeking quick financial gain, receives an invitation to a show promising monetary prizes. Upon joining, she discovers the challenges associated with her ambitions while encountering various obstacles in her personal life and relationships. Over time, she develops feelings for Farjaad Khan, a disciplined businessman, leading to a romantic relationship between them.

=== Season 2 ===
Following Umeed's success on the show *Socho Pakistan*, the narrative focuses on her impending marriage to Farjaad. As they prepare for their union, the couple faces personal and family challenges, which they navigate together leading to their marriage.

== Cast ==
- Sehar Khan as Umeed Pasha: Kamal and Arzoo's daughter; Sameer's sister; Farjaad's wife.
- Hamza Sohail as Farjaad Khan: Shujat and Nighat's son; Mariyam's brother; Umeed's husband.
- Hurain as Diya Khan: Umeed and Farjaad's daughter.
- Ali Safina as Asadullah "AK" Khan: Farjaad's family friend.
- Amna Youzasaif as Mariyam "Mimi" Khan: Shujat and Nighat's daughter; Farjaad's sister.
- Saman Ansari as Nighat "Niggo" Khan: Shujat's widow; Farjaad and Mariyam's mother.
- Aena Khan as Haya Pasha: Hilal and Zeenat's daughter; Sameer's fiancee.
- Adnan Raza Mir as Sameer Pasha: Kamal and Arzoo's son; Umeed's brother; Haya's fiance.
- Saleem Sheikh as Kamal Pasha: Jalal and Abgheena's son; Umeed and Sameer's father.
- Hina Rizvi as Abgheena Pasha: Jalal's widow; Kamal and Hilal's mother.
- Salma Hassan as Zeenat Pasha: Hilal's wife; Haya's mother.
- Tehseen Wajahat as Hilal Pasha: Jalal and Abgheena's son; Zeenat's husband; Haya's father.
- Ahad Raza Mir as himself (game show host)
- Azra Mohyeddin as Rahat: Kamal and Hilal's cousin.
- Manzoor Qureshi as Jalal Pasha: Abgheena's husband; Kamal and Hilal's father.
- Areeba Mir as Zoey: Rahat's niece.
- Rahat Ghani as Mehak: Farjaad's secretary.
- Ahmed Rafique as Waleed: Haya and Umeed's former fiance.

== Production ==
Series	Episodes	Originally released	
Series	Episodes	First released	Last released
1	32	23 March 2023	22 April 2023
2	15	5 August 2023	25 November 2023

=== Season 1 ===
On 5 January 2023, Galaxy Lollywood reported that Sehar Khan, Hamza Sohail, Mustafa Babar, and Aena Khan would star in Hum TV's Ramadan drama, tentatively titled Qismat, written by Sarah Majeed and directed by Ali Hassan. Adnan Raza Mir later replaced Babar in the cast.

=== Season 2 ===
Following the conclusion of the first season, writer Sarah Majeed confirmed a second season on 3 May 2023. Hum TV officially announced the second season on 29 June 2023.

== Reception ==
The Express Tribune commended the lead performances, noting the comedic timing of Sehar Khan and the contrast provided by Hamza Sohail's character. Dawn Images praised the series' humor and lead chemistry.

== Sequel ==
In September 2023, series writer Sarah Majeed indicated potential plans for a third season on social media, though no official announcement has been made by Hum TV or MD Productions.

== See also ==
- Hum TV Broadcasting
- Hum News
