= Cucumisin =

Enzyme

Identifiers
- EC no.: 3.4.21.25
- CAS no.: 82062-89-3

Databases
- IntEnz: IntEnz view
- BRENDA: BRENDA entry
- ExPASy: NiceZyme view
- KEGG: KEGG entry
- MetaCyc: metabolic pathway
- PRIAM: profile
- PDB structures: RCSB PDB PDBe PDBsum
Search
- PMC: articles
- PubMed: articles
- NCBI: proteins

Cucumisin (EC 3.4.21.25, euphorbain, solanain, hurain, tabernamontanain) is an enzyme. This enzyme catalyzes hydrolysis of a wide range of proteins. It has been identified as an allergen in humans.

This enzyme is isolated from the sarcocarp of the musk melon (Cucumis melo).
