= Mere Ban Jao =

2023 Pakistani television series

- Urdu: میرے بن جاؤ
- Genre: Drama; Social issue Suspense; Romance
- Written by: Samira Fazal
- Directed by: Ahmed Kamran
- Starring: Zahid Ahmed; Kinza Hashmi; Azfar Rehman
- Opening theme: "Mere Ban Jao" by Rizwan Anwar & Rose Mary
- Composer: Sami Khan
- Country of origin: Pakistan
- Original language: Urdu
- No. of episodes: 34

Production
- Producers: Momina Duraid; Moomal Shunaid
- Editor: Syed Tariq Hussain
- Camera setup: Multi-camera
- Running time: approx. 40 min
- Production companies: MD Productions; Moomal Entertainment

Original release
- Network: Hum TV
- Release: 11 January – 30 August 2023

Mere Ban Jao (Urdu: میرے بن جاؤ, lit. 'Become mine') is a Pakistani drama television series directed by Ahmed Kamran, written by Samira Fazal and produced by Momina Duraid under the banners of Moomal Entertainment and MD Productions. It stars Zahid Ahmed, Kinza Hashmi and Azfar Rehman in leading roles. The series focusses on the negative impact of social media including cyberbullying linked to leakage of one's private photos and videos.

== Plot ==
Azmiya has been raised by her mother Salma with the advice that she should keep her future husband happy, no matter the circumstances. She is engaged with Fardeen, the son of her step aunt. One day, Fardeen video calls her and demands she remove her shirt for him. She first refuses but budges upon his insistence, while considering that he is her future husband and she should not displease him. Fardeen gets from her whatever he wants as he gets angry with her over almost everything.

Her childhood friend and now the tailor in her neighbourhood, Zaki is in one-sided love with her. He listens to her crying on the phone with Fardeen. Zaki later advises her not to marry a person who made her cry so much even before marriage. She considers Zaki a bad person who interferes in others affairs. But, her opinion about him changes when Salma appoints him as a helper for the marriage work.

A day before her rukhsati, Fardeen comes to her room silently and tries to be intimate with her. She refuses to go along and slaps him. He divorces her instantly.

== Cast ==
- Zahid Ahmed as Zaki
- Kinza Hashmi as Azmiya
- Azfar Rehman as Fardeen
- Hira Tareen as Nadira
- Ayesha Gul as Salma
- Rabia Noreen as Hajra
- Fazila Qazi as Salima
- Qaiser Khan Nizamani as Murad
- Noman Habib as Aslam
- Afraz Rasool as Hassan
- Mehrunnisa Iqbal as Farah
- Rehma Zaman as Nighat
