= Ismail Jilani =

Pakistani film director and media activist

- Born: Karachi, Sindh, Pakistan
- Education: Pakistan Military Academy
- Alma mater: Junior Cadets Academy Mangla
- Occupations: Film director and Media activist
- Years active: 2000-present
- Notable work: Chambaili

Ismail Jilani (Urdu: اسماعیل جیلانی) is a Pakistani director, documentary film maker, media activist and former officer of the Pakistani Army. He came to prominence for his 2005 reality show George Ka Pakistan which is considered to be one of South Asia's first original reality TV shows. He then directed Zara Sochiye, a show based on his political campaign which garnered great attention by public. In 2013 he directed the critically and financially successful Pakistani political thriller film Chambaili.

== Personal life ==
Ismail Jilani born to Muslim parents in Karachi. His father Syed Iqbal Shah was also a filmmaker who made the first Pakistani animated film in 1960. Jilani attenuated Junior Cadets Academy Mangla and then joined Pakistan Military Academy where he received double bachelor's degree in mathematics and physics. He then received a diploma in film and video making from the Academy of Photogenic Arts in Sydney, Australia.

== Work and career ==
Ismail Jilani has directed and edited a number of television productions from dramas to documentaries, magazine/reality shows to commercials and broadcast campaigns. As director, cameraman and editor, his most popular show was George Ka Pakistan that was telecast on Geo TV. A show about the British journalist George Fulton who experienced staying nine years in Pakistan. The show is considered to be a first original reality show of South Asia that set new standards of popularity for satellite viewing in Pakistan and the Pakistani diaspora abroad. Ismail has started a campaign Zara Sochiye a campaign series that caught the public's attention and set course for media activism in Pakistan was on the taboo subject of Hudood Ordinance. This campaign is cited in contemporary media history as one of the biggest print and broadcast campaign in Pakistan that ultimately led to the amendments that were introduced in the Hudood laws in the parliament through legislature Jilani also made a documentary on Bonded Labour, that also proves beneficial and was short-listed for International Media Excellence Awards in 2009. Ismail has worked at Indus Vision, Geo TV and ARY Digital Network as a director, executive producer and editor in many programs and shows.

== Chambaili ==
In 2011 Ismail Jilani started working on Shahzad Nawaz script, and it took half and year to complete the screenplay process, in 2012 production began and film released on April 26, 2013 under the banner of Geo Films. Jilani stated that "We wanted to mobilize the people before the elections, We wanted them to come out of the cinema and feel like they wanted to change something". Chambailli grossed Rs 37.8 crore at the box office. At its release, the film surpassed Bollywood's Aashiqui 2 and Hollywood's Oblivion at the Pakistani box office. It was discussed in the national media, and has been praised for its contribution to democracy in Pakistan. Chambaili has been credited with galvanizing non-voters and youth to vote in the 2013 Pakistani general elections, which had a large turnout. Political parties in the country played songs from its soundtrack during campaign rallies, as young people resonated with the film and its music as part of increased social and political activism.

== Filmography ==
Year	Film	Note
2013	Chambaili	Nom: ARY Film Award for Best Director.

== Programs and TV Shows ==
Year	Program	Note
2005	George Ka Pakistan	Director, Cameraman and editor.
2006–present	Zara Sochiye	Director
