= Saima Akram Chaudhry =

Pakistani screenwriter (born 1985)

Saima Akram Chaudhry صائمہ اکرم چودھری
- Born: 23 June 1985 (age 41); Sadiqabad, Rahim Yar Khan, Punjab, Pakistan
- Citizenship: Pakistani
- Education: Bahauddin Zakariya University
- Occupation: Screenwriter
- Years active: 2010–present

Saima Akram Chaudhry (Urdu: صائمہ اکرم چودھری) is a Pakistani screenwriter. She is known for her work in Pakistani television serials. She has also written the scripts of light-hearted Ramadan special dramas including Suno Chanda, Chupke Chupke, Hum Tum, Ishq Jalebi and Chaudhry and Sons.

== Early life ==
She was born in the Sadiqabad, a tehsil of Rahim Yar Khan District, in Punjab. She earned her M.A. in Mass Communication from the Bahauddin Zakariya University.

== Career ==
Her first serial was Muhabbat Ab Nahi Hugi in 2014. She wrote Anaya Tumhari Hui in 2015.

Later, she wrote many scripts, including Mere Ajnabi, and Mera Dard Na Janay Koi (both in 2015), Adhi Gawahi (2017), Gustakh (2020), and Choti Choti Batain (2019).

She wrote television films such as Love Siyapa and Dil Tera Hogaya in 2020. Her romantic comedy serial Suno Chanda (2018) earned her critical acclaim. She also wrote the sequel to Suno Chanda, Suno Chanda season 2.

She wrote two Ramadan plays in 2021, Ishq Jalebi and Chupke Chupke, and another two in 2022, Hum Tum and Chaudhry and Sons.

The following year, her next series Chand Tara failed to achieve the level of popularity compared to her previous Ramadan scripts, after which she announced a break of one or two years from writing Ramadan specials.

== Filmography (as a writer) ==
Year	Title	Director	Network	Notes	Ref(s)
2014	Muhabbat Ab Nahi Hugi				
2015	Mera Dard Na Janay Koi				
2017	Adhi Gawahi				
2018	Kaisi Aurat Hoon Main				
2018	Suno Chanda	Aehsun Talish	Hum TV		
2019	Suno Chanda 2	Aehsun Talish	Hum TV		
2020	Gustakh				
2020	Love Siyappa			Telefilm	
2021	Teri Meri Kahani	Aehsun Talish		Telefilm	
2021	Chupke Chupke	Danish Nawaz			
2021	Ishq Jalebi	Syed Wajahat Hussain			
2022	Hum Tum	Danish Nawaz	Hum TV	Ramadan Series	
2022	Chaudhry and Sons	Syed Wajahat Hussain	Geo Entertainment		
2022	Kala Doriya	Danish Nawaz	Hum TV		
2023	Chand Tara	Danish Nawaz	Hum TV		
2024	Achari Mohabbat			Telefilm	
2025	Neeli Kothi	Anjum Shahzad	Hum TV		
2026	Dekh Zara Pyar Se	Ali Hassan	Hum TV	Ramadan Series	

== Awards and nominations ==
Year	Award	Category	Work	Result	Ref(s)
2022	8th Hum Awards	Best Writer Drama Serial	Chupke Chupke	Nominated	
2022	21st Lux Style Awards	Best Television Writer	Ishq Jalebi	Nominated	
2024	9th Hum Awards	Best Writer Drama Serial	Hum Tum	Nominated	
