= Badshah Begum (TV series) =

2022 Pakistani television series

- Title screen
- بادشاہ بیگم
- Genre: Dark; Historical; Political; Thriller
- Based on: Jahanara Begum; Mughal Empire; Interior Sindh
- Written by: Saji Gul
- Directed by: Khizer Idrees
- Starring: Zara Noor Abbas; Farhan Saeed; Yasir Hussain; Hamza Sohail; Komal Meer; Shahzad Nawaz; Saman Ansari; (entire cast)
- Opening theme: "Ye Ishq hai" by Ali Pervez Mehdi
- Composer: Suhaib Rashdi
- Country of origin: Pakistan
- Original languages: Urdu; Sindhi (Minor)
- No. of seasons: 1
- No. of episodes: 31 (List of Episodes)

Production
- Executive producers: Rafay Rashdi, Momina Duraid
- Producer: Rafay Rashdi
- Production locations: Larkana and Karachi, Pakistan
- Camera setup: Multi-Camera setup 1080p
- Running time: 36-41 Minutes approx
- Production companies: MD Productions; Rafay Rashdi Productions

Original release
- Network: Hum TV
- Release: 1 March – 18 October 2022

Badshah Begum (Urdu: بادشاہ بیگم, lit. 'Padshah Begum') is a 2022 Pakistani television historical drama series produced by Rafay Rashdi and Momina Duraid under the banners of Rafay Rashdi Productions and MD Productions, written by Saji Gul and directed by Khizer Idrees. It features Zara Noor Abbas, Farhan Saeed, Hamza Sohail, Ali Rehman Khan, Yasir Hussain, Shahzad Nawaz, Komal Meer and Saman Ansari in prominent roles. The story revolves around politics, power, lust, and rivalry among siblings to get the throne. The series aired on Hum TV from 1 March 2022 to 18 October 2022.

== Plot ==
The drama is set in the fictional village of Peeraan Pur (Interior Larkana, Sindh) which tells the real concept of Gaddi and Politics. When undesired circumstances force his city-born and raised children Jahan Ara, Roshan and Shahmir to their hometown, they find themselves tangled in powerplay and politics that they never wished to be a part of. What follows is an epic tale of dynastic politics, sibling rivalry and anarchy.

Badshah Begum is based on true historical incidents which took place during the 16th and 17th centuries. The characters of Jahan Ara and Roshan Ara are based on the historical figures which lived during the Mughal Empire. They were daughters of the fifth Mughal emperor Shah Jahan, Jahanara Begum and Roshanara Begum. Jahanara was the most honorable Badshah Begum of that time who established herself in the Agra Fort. The drama highlights incidents that occurred during the rule of Jahanara Begum.

== Cast ==
Name	Role	Notes
Zara Noor Abbas	Jahan Ara	Jahan Ara Shah Alam is the daughter of Pir Shah Alam and sister of Roshan Ara & Pir Shahmir & half sister to Pir Shahzaib and Pir Murad. She was throned Badshah Begum and is the love interest of Bakhtiar. Based on Jahanara Begum, a Shahzadi of the Mughal Empire, later on Badshah Begum of Mughal Empire.
Shahzad Nawaz	Pir Shah Alam	He was the powerful head and Pir of Peeran Pur. He has five children from two deceased wives; Shahzaib, Murad, Jahan Ara, Roshan Ara and Shahmir. The two camps of children do not get along and get into a feud that threatens to change and ruin lives. He is based on the 5th Mughal emperor Shah Jahan.
Saman Ansari	Hakim Bi	Sister of Pir Shah Alam. She was the caretaker of Badshah Begum's throne until a successor was named. She however is manipulative and wants the title of Badshah Begum for herself. The aunt of Jahan Ara, Roshan Ara, Pir Shahzaib, Pir Shahmir and Pir Murad.
Izzah Malik	Hakim Bi (young)	Sister of Pir Shah Alam. She was the caretaker of Badshah Begum's throne until a successor was named. She however is manipulative and wants the title of Badshah Begum for herself. The aunt of Jahan Ara, Roshan Ara, Pir Shahzaib, Pir Shahmir and Pir Murad.
Farhan Saeed	Pir Shahzaib	Pir Shah Alam's son and an heir to the Piran Pura throne, a Pir, and brother of Pir Murad. He is the half brother of Jahan Ara, Roshan Ara and Pir Shahmir. Based on Aurangzeb, a Shahzada of the Mughal Empire.
Ali Rehman Khan	Bakhtiar	A University friend of Jahan Ara and Roshan Ara, love interest of Jahan Ara, tied with knot for "slavery" of PeeranPur and Badshah Begum. Based on Mirza Najabat Khan.
Yasir Hussain	Pir Qaisar	Son of Pir Shah Alam's eldest brother and Hakim Bi's nephew. The cousin of Jahan Ara, Roshan Ara, Pir Shahzaib, Pir Shahmir and Pir Murad, he was also a Pir.
Hamza Sohail	Pir Shahmir	The son of Pir Shah Alam and brother of Jahan Ara & Roshan Ara and half brother of Pir Shahzaib and Pir Murad. He married Gulnar. Based on Dara Shikoh.
Komal Meer	Roshan Ara	The daughter of Pir Shah Alam and sister of Jahan Ara & Pir Shahmir & half sister to Pir Shahzaib and Pir Murad. She was crowned Badshah Begum for a brief period. Based on Roshanara Begum.
Abul Hassan	Pir Murad	A Pir and Pir Shah Alam's son, brother of Pir Shahzaib and half brother of Jahan Ara. Roshan Ara and Pir Shahmir. Based on Murad Bakhsh.
Tanya Hussain	Zulaikha	Wife of Pir Shahzaib Shah Alam
Hiba Aziz	Gulnaar	Peerni (Crown Princess) of Peeran Pur and wife of Pir Shahmir.
Kasim Khan	Tara	The love interest of Gulnaar, later killed by Murad.
Uzma Beg	Bakhtiar's mother	The mother of Bakhtiar.
Akbar Islam	Khalifah Nawaz	Zulekha's father and the father-in-law of Pir Shahzaib.
Kausar Suddiqui	Mahnaz Bano	Second wife of Pir Shah Alam and mother of Jahan Ara, Roshan Ara and Pir Shahmeer

== Soundtrack ==
The official soundtrack of the series is performed by Ali Pervez Mehdi on the lyrics of Saji Gul and Music Composition by Suhaib Rashdi. The Original Sound Track of the series has been widely praised by the audience. People love the OST and the overall feel.

== Reception ==
Minutes before its launch, the serial trended at number 1 on twitter along with Zara Noor Abbas, Farhan Saeed and Yasir Hussain as well. The first episode achieved decent ratings of 5.8 TRP and mixed response from audience and social media users. However, while reviewing first episode, critics lauded the direction and performances of the cast members. After airing 6 episodes, Youline Magazine praised the performances of almost all the actors but criticised the, writing, executional lapses and slow pace. The story was however praised stating, "On paper, the story certainly has good bones".

== Production ==
=== Development and casting ===
After making his big screen debut as producer and director, Rafay Rashdi started working on his next project in late 2017 which was written by Saji Gul. Saba Qamar was selected to play the main role. It was then decided to release as a web-series with other actors until early 2019 including Faysal Quraishi, Imran Ashraf, Mohsin Abbas Haider and Gohar Rasheed. Qamar was then replaced by Iman Ali after which the project was shelved due to some unknown reasons. In late 2021, the work on the project restarted with Farhan Saeed revealed to be a part of the project and it was changed to a television series under the banner of MD Productions of Momina Duraid and Rafay Rashdi Production. Zara Noor Abbas was chosen to play the main role, earlier offered to Ali. In early 2022, it was also announced that Yasir Hussain and Ali Rehman Khan had also joined the cast with other cast members of Saman Ansari, Shahzad Nawaz, Hamza Sohail, Komal Meer, Hiba Aziz and Abul Hassan.

=== Filming and location ===
The principal photography began in Larkana in October 2021 with a spell of 90 days on the ancestral Haveli of the producer, Rashdi. After that, the filming also took place in Karachi.

=== Release and promotion ===
The first teaser was released on 2 February 2022 while the original soundtrack was released on 24 February 2022.

The series premiered on 1 March 2022, Tuesdays with a timeslot of 08:00pm by succeeding Ibn-e-Hawwa, while Ibn-e-Hawwa moved to Saturdays, as Qissa Meherbano Ka ended.

== Awards and nominations ==
Year	Ceremony	Category	Recipient	Result	Ref.
October 6, 2023	Lux Style Awards	Best Ensemble Play	Badshah Begum	Nominated	
