= Chaudhry and Sons =

2022 Pakistani television series

- Title card
- Urdu: چوھدری اینڈ سنز
- Written by: Saima Akram Chaudhry
- Directed by: Syed Wajahat Hussain
- Starring: Sohail Ahmed; Imran Ashraf; Ayeza Khan
- Theme music composer: Wajid Saeed
- Opening theme: Wajhi Farooki; Aishwarya Majmudar
- Country of origin: Pakistan
- Original languages: Urdu; Punjabi
- No. of episodes: 35

Production
- Producers: Abdullah Kadwani; Asad Qureshi
- Cinematography: Qasim Zaman
- Animators: Junaid Khatri; Arif Qureshi; Rawaiz Khan
- Editors: Faizan Saleem; Adil Raza; Majid Raza
- Running time: 35 – 43 minutes (Note: Last 3 episodes were mega episodes, aired in double parts.)
- Production company: 7th Sky Entertainment

Original release
- Network: Har Pal Geo
- Release: 3 April – 5 May 2022

Chaudhry and Sons (Urdu: چوہدری اینڈ سنز) is a 2022 Pakistani romantic family comedy drama television series produced by Abdullah Kadwani and Asad Qureshi under the 7th Sky Entertainment banner. It is written by Saima Akram Chaudhry and features Imran Ashraf and Ayeza Khan in lead roles with a supporting cast of Sohail Ahmed, Irsa Ghazal, Madiha Rizvi, Asma Abbas, Yasir Nawaz, Beenish Chohan, Noor ul Hassan and Shagufta Ijaz.

The series aired on Har Pal Geo as Ramadan and Eid al-Fitr special, with daily episodes from 3 April to 5 May 2022.

== Cast and characters ==
=== Main ===
- Sohail Ahmed as Chaudhry Dildar Ali Hoshiarpuri:
  He lives in Lahore and owns a business of transport which he shares with Shakir and Tashi.
- Ayeza Khan as Parisa "Pari" Ahmed:
  She is Dildar's lost granddaughter (daughter's daughter (Note: Additionally, Sabahat "Sabbo" Ali's character is used in the plot. Dildar's daughter, she married outside Chaudhry family without their permission, (Note: Because Chaudhry family have been following inter-family marriage policy. Later, when Pari's truth is revealed to everyone, Dildar, after expressing much anger, is left with no other choice but to forgive Sabbo after which this policy breaks. Billu marries Pari, Tashi marries Paro, and Dildar marries Salma.) 25 years earlier, and moved to Hyderabad with her husband Ali Muhammad, Malika's son. The couple perished in a train accident after two years, leaving behind their daughter Pari.)), who is unable to pass her exams for years. She had owned a couple of lovebirds whom she called "Chanda" and "Tara". Her marriage is arranged with Billu.
- Imran Ashraf as Bilal "Billu" Chaudhry:
  Dildar's grandson (son's son), he also hasn't obtained his BBA in four years. He loves to rap and is a die-hard fan of Emma Watson whom he claims is also a British-Chaudhry to cover his parents' reaction. His marriage is arranged with Pari.

=== Recurring ===
- Irsa Ghazal as Principal Malika Jehan:
  Pari's paternal grandmother from Hyderabad, Sindh, she has single handedly nurtured Pari and secretly wants her to re-unite with Chaudhry family. She speaks mixed Urdu and English. No one knows their truth except Shakir and Tashi, and they are treated as guests from Hyderabad Deccan instead.
- Noor ul Hassan as Shakir Chaudhry:
  Billu's father, Shakir is continuously being taunted by his father Dildar over looking even older and not applying black hair dye. Upon discovering the truth about Pari, he consoles her over staying with them and assures of supporting if anything goes against her.
- Asma Abbas as Naima "Nimmo":
  She is Dildar's niece (brother's daughter) and Billu's mother.
- Yasir Nawaz as Tashfeen "Tashi" Chaudhry:
  He is Nimmo's un-married brother who still grieves for his ex-fiancée cousin Sabbo.
- Zoya Nasir as Tooba:
  She is Billu's neighbour and current university fellow, who secretly loves him but could not express it openly.
- Madiha Rizvi as Sheeba "Shabbo":
  Dildar's niece (sister's daughter) and Bunty's mother, she is ordered by everyone in home to keep working in kitchen, due to which she wants a separate house instead, however, she sometimes laughs during serious discussions. She was a 14 grade officer before her marriage.
- Saqib Sumeer as Dr. Sabir Chaudhry:
  Shakir's brother and Shabbo's husband, he is a veterinarian and is often taunted for his profession as he had not taken a position in the heirship business.
- Ashraf Khan as Ramazan:
  He is Tooba's grandfather and Dildar's longtime friend from Gujranwala.
- Beenish Chohan as Mahpara "Paro":
  Tooba's aunt (mother's sister) and Ramazan's daughter, she secretly loves Tashi but couldn't marry him.
- Humaira Bano as Zulekha
- Hammad Shoaib as Shoaib "Shobi":
  Billu's best friend, he is after Tooba.
- Raeed Muhammad Alam as Shahrukh:
  Pari's neighbor in Hyderabad, he stalks her. He visits Lahore for his job and engagement, where he also meets Pari. He unknowingly exposes Pari's truth to the Chaudhry family.
- Sami Khan as Baizad "Bunty" Chaudhry:
  Shabbo's son, he is also weak in studies and often fights with his fellows. However, his parents want him to study so he wouldn't go into family business and work on his own, like his parents.
- Mehboob Sultan
- Arif Khan
- Shareef Baloch
- Anees Alam

=== Guest cast ===
- Shagufta Ejaz as Dr. Salma Hashmi:
  She is Dildar's secret love interest whom he couldn't marry 35 years back.
- Usman Peerzada as Professor Bakht:
  Billu's teacher in university, he is Dildar, Ramazan, and Salma's fellow-turned-rival for years.
- Iftikhar Thakur as Mukhtar Chaudhry:
  Dildar's cousin from Hyderabad Deccan, he also knows Pari's truth as he helps in staging Pari's marriage with Billu as soon as possible due to his illness, however, he passes away.

== Production ==
In January 2022, it was confirmed that Ayeza Khan and Imran Ashraf paired up for Geo Entertainment's Ramadan special television series which is written by Saima Akram Chaudhry. Ayeza Khan's character was first approached to Maya Ali and Sana Javed. Later, it was revealed that Shagufta Ejaz, Asma Abbas, Ashraf Khan, Yasir Nawaz, Beenish Chohan and Sohail Ahmed; latter will be starring in a television series after 8 years since his last series Ullu Baraye Farokht Nahi. DAWN Images reported that the storyline is about a desi family of Lahore's 'Punjabi lifestyle' and their split in Hyderabad, Sindh.
