= Inkaar (TV series) =

2019 Pakistani television series

- Genre: Thriller; Social
- Written by: Zafar Mairaj
- Directed by: Kashif Nisar
- Starring: Yumna Zaidi; Imran Ashraf; Sami Khan
- Opening theme: "Ek Baar Hai Inkaar" by Faiza Mujahid
- Ending theme: "Ek Baar Hai Inkaar" by Faiza Mujahid
- Country of origin: Pakistan
- Original language: Urdu
- No. of episodes: 24

Production
- Producer: Momina Duraid
- Production location: Lahore
- Camera setup: Multi-camera setup
- Production company: MD Productions

Original release
- Network: Hum TV
- Release: 11 March – 19 August 2019

Inkaar (Urdu: انکار, lit. 'Refusal') is a 2019 Pakistani television series, produced by Momina Duraid under her banner MD Productions. The series aired weekly on Hum TV every Monday, replacing Aatish. It stars Yumna Zaidi, Imran Ashraf, Sami Khan, and Rehan Sheikh. The series revolves around the plight and ultimate fight of a girl against the corrupt and deeply flawed justice system. The series was loosely inspired by the real-life incident involving a female lawyer Khadija Siddiqui, who was stabbed by her class fellow in broad daylight.

It aired on Hum Pashto 1 in Pashto language under the same title. The series also on Zindagi in India 23 February 2023, under the same title.

Inkkar received positive reviews and received praise for Zaidi and Sheikh's performance. The series was nominated in 6 categories at 19th Lux Style Awards and won Best TV Actress for Zaidi.

== Plot ==
Inkaar is about the story of a girl Hajra, who comes from a middle-class background and studies at a university. She wants to fulfil her dreams and her father Haji Ilyas fully supports her. Hajra falls in love with Rehan Chaudhary. Rehan was a friend of Shayan. One day, Rehan Chaudhary calls Hajra to Shayan's house and tries to rape her. Shayan reaches there and saves Hajra. The whole matter closes there because proceeding against Rehan could impact Hajra's reputation too. Hajra leaves the university without telling anyone anything. Shayan tells his parents that he loves Hajra, his university fellow, and wants to marry her. Firstly, Shayan's father disagrees due to class difference but further on he agrees. Hajra resists to the proposal as she is mentally disturbed due to the incident with Rehan. The story unfolds and she tells Shayan about what happened with her. Shayan tells her he has no problem with her past and that he still loves her and wants to marry her. They both get engaged. On the other side, when Rehan learns of their engagement, he becomes angry; he wanted Hajra because he is obsessed with her. He tries to blackmail Hajra and forces her to break the engagement, but she rejects him repeatedly. He finally tells her the house he called her and tried to rape her belongs to Shayan and not Rehan. And that Shayan is Rehan's childhood friend, and he knew everything about them already. Furious and shocked Hajra goes to Shayan's house just to realize that this is the same house. She believes what Rehan said and breaks her engagement. Shayan after many efforts convince her to listen to her part of the story in Rehan's presence to clear his position. She agrees to meet him. In the presence of Rehan, Shayan tells Hajra that he has been madly in love with her since he first saw her. He was shy by nature, so he asked Rehan to help him and tell her about his feelings. Rehan, however, trapped Hajra pretending to be in love with her and tried to get the advantage of her. All that time, he lied to Shayan that he has befriended Hajra to convince her for Shayan's proposal. In the end, Rehan told Shayan that Hajra is not a girl with good character and to prove that to him he called Hajra at Shayan's home, pretending to be ill and tried to rape her. Shayan saves her by stopping Rehan and Hajra escaped without knowing who saved her from Rehan. After telling the whole story he asks Hajra to take whatever decision she wants and that he will stand with her every decision. Hajra decides to be with Shayan and they are set to get married. On Shayan and Hajra's marriage day, Rehan arrives in beauty salon where Hajra was getting ready. He tries that Hajra runs away with him, but Hajra rejects him by saying No Means No. This infuriates Rehan and he stabs her with scissors 25 times. Hajra is saved but the case goes to court and then starts the war of honor between Hajra and Rehan, where Rehan and his mother using all their influences and power try to prove Hajra to be a characterless girl. At the end, Rehan is sent to jail when a video showing what happened was seen by everyone in the courthouse. Rehan was given 7 years in prison and justice could be served but Hajra forgives him in court because she said she made a promise to Rehan's mom that if she had the chance, Hajra would forgive him. She asks that Rehan be sent to live with his mom so he can learn how to respect other women. At the end, Hajra and Shayan are together, and everyone is happy for Hajra's win. Rehan is with his mom and begs for her to save him and cries at his feet.

== Cast ==
- Yumna Zaidi as Hajra
- Imran Ashraf as Rehan Chaudhry
- Sami Khan as Shayan Malik
- Rehan Sheikh as Hafiz Ilyas Sahab
- Noor ul Hassan as Malik Sahab
- Rizwan Riaz as Ibrar Hussain journalist
- Imran Peerzada as Wajahat Chaudhry; Rehan's father
- Munazzah Arif as Rehan's stepmother
- Kinza Malik as Zulekha
- Washma Fatima as Hajra's friend
- Haseeb Muhammad Bin Qasim as University Professor
- Ali Tahir as Azam Iqbal
- Jazib Akram as Jawad
- Hassan Mir as Sarfaraz Ahmed
- Nabeela Khan as Shayan's mother
- Iftikhar Iffi as Gullu Badshah
- Saima Noreen as Mrs. Wajahat Chaudhry; Rehan's biological mother
- Saima Saleem
- Zaryab Haider
- Sarfaraz Ansari
- Dua Khan
- Sehraab Afgan
- Rana Aftab
- Wasim Akram
- Tariq Prince
- Shamma Rana
- Nimmal Fatima
- Saba Shahid
- Shiza Khan
- Qamar Shifa
- Raja Nasir
- Shahid Khan
- Azam Butt
- Masood Khan
- Abdul Hadi

== Production ==
=== Background ===
The series marked the third collaboration of writer Zafar Mairaj and director Kashif Nisar, after Dumpukht - Aatish-e-Ishq and Lashkara.

It marked seventh on-screen appearance of Sami Khan with Yumna Zaidi after Khushi Ek Roag, Teri Raah Main Rul Gai, Meri Dulari, Dil Mohallay Ki Haveli, Kaanch Ki Guriya and Paras while fifth on-screen appearance of Noor Ul Jassan and Kinza Malik after Sammi, Alif Allah Aur Insaan, Dar Si Jaati Hai Sila and Lashkara.

== Reception ==
Yumna Zaidi's performance was highly acclaimed in whole drama. Despite being low on ratings, Inkaar received critical acclaim and highly positive reviews from critics due to its realistic portrayal and brilliant performances. Rehan Sheikh's portrayal as a supporting and progressive father who stands by his daughter, was well received. However, critics panned the conclusion of the series, and termed it as regressive and unsatisfactory.

== Awards and nominations ==
Date of ceremony	Award	Category	Recipient(s) and nominee(s)	Result	Ref.
7 February 2020	Pakistan International Screen Awards	Best Television Play	Momina Duraid	Nominated	
7 February 2020	Pakistan International Screen Awards	Best Television Director	Kashif Nisar	Nominated	
7 February 2020	Pakistan International Screen Awards	Best Television Actor- Critics choice	Imran Ashraf	Nominated	
7 February 2020	Pakistan International Screen Awards	Best Television Actor- Critics choice	Sami Khan	Nominated	
7 February 2020	Pakistan International Screen Awards	Best Television Actor- Critics choice	Rehan Sheikh	Nominated	
7 February 2020	Pakistan International Screen Awards	Best Television Actress - Critics choice	Yumna Zaidi	Nominated	
7 February 2020	Pakistan International Screen Awards	Best Television Writer	Zafar Mairaj	Nominated	
31 December 2020	Lux Style Awards	Best TV Director	Kashif Nisar	Nominated	
31 December 2020	Lux Style Awards	Best TV Actor - Critics choice	Rehan Sheikh	Nominated	
31 December 2020	Lux Style Awards	Best TV Actor	Rehan Sheikh	Nominated	
31 December 2020	Lux Style Awards	Best TV Actress - Critics choice	Yumna Zaidi	Nominated	
31 December 2020	Lux Style Awards	Best TV Actress	Yumna Zaidi	Won	
31 December 2020	Lux Style Awards	Best TV Writer	Zafar Mairaj	Nominated	
