= Yumna Zaidi =

Pakistani actress (born 1989)

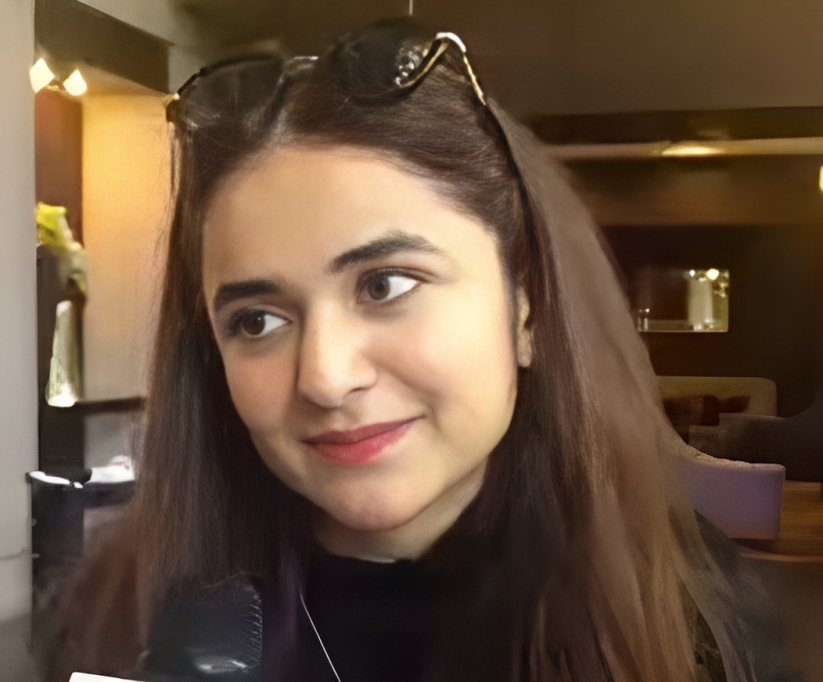
- Zaidi in 2019
- Born: Karachi, Sindh, Pakistan
- Occupation: Actress
- Years active: 2012–present

Yumna Zaidi is a Pakistani actress who works in Urdu television. Known for her portrayals in social and romantic dramas, Zaidi is the recipient of seven Lux Style Awards and two Hum Awards. She is the actress with the most Lux Style Award wins.

She first appeared as a supporting character in ARY Digital's domestic-drama Thakan (2012) and then played more prominent roles in several television series, including the family drama Meri Dulari and the revenge-themed Ullu Baraye Farokht Nahi (both 2013), the latter of which earned her a nomination of Hum Award for Best Supporting Actress. She gained popularity and Hum Award for Best Actress nominations by portraying a troubled wife in Farooq Rind's tragic-romance Rishtay Kuch Adhooray Se and received praise for the jealous-drama Mausam (both 2014), the comedy drama Jugnoo (2015), the romance Zara Yaad Kar (2016) and the romantic comedy Yeh Raha Dil (2017).

Zaidi gained critical praise and established herself by starring in Dar Si Jaati Hai Sila (2017), Inkaar (2019), Pyar Ke Sadqay (2020), Dil Na Umeed To Nahi (2021) and Bakhtawar (2022) the second, third and last of these earned her Lux Style Award for Best Television Actress. In 2023, she earned significant recognition for her role in Tere Bin, marking a major commercial breakthrough for her.

== Career ==
=== Early work (2012) ===
Her first screen debut was a supporting role in the ARY Digital's 2012 domestic drama Thakan, and followed it with a leading role in the melodrama Khushi Ek Roag. She then appeared in Urdu 1's Teri Raah Main Rul Gai opposite Samiya Mumtaz and Sami Khan where she played the character of Maryam.

=== Critical acclaim (2013–2023) ===
Zaidi received praise for portraying emotionally intense characters in the dramas, Geo TV's Meri Dulari (2013) and Hum TV's Ullu Baraye Farokht Nahi (2013), the later of which garnered her a Best Supporting Actress nomination at Hum Awards. Her acclaimed role of a troubled wife in the tragic romance Rishtay Kuch Adhooray Se (2013), established her as a leading actress of Pakistan and earned her nominations for the Hum Award for Best Actress and Best Actress Popular. Zaidi subsequently did a special appearance in 2013 series Sannata and played supporting role in Kashif Nisar's directorial Kis Se Kahoon alongside Sajal Ali and Agha Ali. She gained wider recognition for portraying a range of characters in the dramas Mausam (2014), Madawa (2015), Guzaarish (2015), and Jugnoo (2015), Kaanch Ki Guriya (2015), Paras (2015) and Aap ki Kaneez (2015), some of which garnered her several Best Actress nominations.

In 2016 she appeared in Momina Duraid's Zara Yaad Kar where she played the lead character of Uzma Ikhtiar opposite Zahid Ahmed and Sana Javed. She then appeared in Hum TV's Yeh Raha Dil in 2017 opposite Ahmed Ali. Zaidi played the character of Hayat whose mother has died and father deserted her at a young age. Her on-screen chemistry with Ali was praised by viewers and earned her nomination of Best on-screen couple at Hum Awards. Later she signed Kashif Nisar's directorial Pinjra. In the same year she appeared as Sila, a victim of sexual harassment in Bee Gul's directed Dar Si Jaati Hai Sila opposite Noman Ijaz and Saman Ansari. A critic from The News International praised her stating, "With fewer dialogues and a tough subject at hand, Yumna pulled off her role effortlessly, making it believable from beginning till the end".

In 2018–19, she appeared in Pukaar as Samra, widow of the feudal lord and appeared in 7th Sky Entertainment's Dil Kiya Karey, directed by Mehreen Jabbar. She played the role of Hajra in social drama Inkaar opposite Imran Ashraf and Sami Khan and made a special appearance in Angeline Malik's anthology series Choti Choti Batain. She further appeared in an extended cameo in Ishq Zahe Naseeb and as Raina in telefilm Shaadi Impossible.

=== Expansion to films (2024–present) ===
She made her film debut with the titular role of an aspiring cricketer in Umair Nasir Ali's directed Nayab (2024). Writing for The Express Tribune, Shafiq Siddiqui disliked the film and wrote, "It does not offer any dialogue that bear recall value, the film grapples with its excessively long runtime, leading to a loss of impact at various junctures". Also, Zaidi's performance was not well received, opined, "Despite playing the titular character, she [struggles] for proper projection and lines that would make her character memorable."

== Other work ==
Zaidi has written poetry, especially Sufi poetry, that she has also recited for social media. She walked the ramp for designer Aisha Farid's collection Crystalline on Hum TV's Bridal Couture Week. She has also appeared in celebrity comedy talkshow Mazaaq Raat in 2017.

In 2016 the Pakistan Electronic Media Regulatory Authority served a show-cause notice to Udaari. Lending her support, she stated:

It is based on a social cause and we should create awareness in our society through such drama serials.

== Filmography ==
=== Films ===
Year	Title	Role	Director	Production	Notes	Ref
2024	Nayab	Nayab	Umair Nasir Ali	Kenneyz Films & NUM Films	Debut film	

=== Television ===
Year	Title	Role	Network	Notes	Ref(s)
2012	Thakan	Mehak	ARY Digital	Debut	
2012	Khushi Ek Roag	Aabroo	ARY Digital		
2012	Teri Raah Main Rul Gai	Maryam	Urdu 1		
2013	Meri Dulari	Abdar Yawar	Geo Entertainment		
2013	Ullu Baraye Farokht Nahi	Aasia Yqoob	Hum TV		
2013	Dil Mohallay Ki Haveli	Mehrunissa	Geo Entertainment		
2013	Rishtay Kuch Adhooray Se	Kiran	Hum TV		
2013	Ruswaiyaan		SabTV		
2013	Sannata	Naseeban (young)	ARY Digital	Cameo appearance	
2014	Kis Se Kahoon	Salma	PTV Home		
2014	Mausam	Shazia	Hum TV		
2015	Madawa	Ayman	Hum Sitaray		
2015	Kaanch Ki Guriya	Manal	Geo Entertainment		
2015	Guzaarish	Zara Aalam	ARY Digital		
2015	Aap Ki Kaneez	Kaneez Fatima	Geo Entertainment		
2015	Jugnoo	Jugnoo	Hum TV		
2015	Paras	Aiman	Geo Entertainment		
2016	Zara Yaad Kar	Uzma Ikhtiyar	Hum TV		
2017	Pinjra	Amtul Rafey	A-Plus TV		
2017	Yeh Raha Dil	Hayat	Hum TV		
2017	Dar Si Jati Hai Sila	Sila	Hum TV		
2018	Pukaar	Samra Sultan	ARY Digital		
2018	Dil Kiya Karay	Aiman	Geo Entertainment		
2019	Inkaar	Hajra	Hum TV		
2019	Choti Choti Batain	Bisma	Hum TV	Story: Bandhan	
2019	Ishq Zahe Naseeb	Shakra (Sameer's Illusion)	Hum TV	Extended cameo	
2020	Pyar Ke Sadqay	Mahjabeen Abdullah	Hum TV		
2020	Raaz-e-Ulfat	Mushq	Geo Entertainment		
2021	Dil Na Umeed To Nahi	Sumbul / Allah Rakhi	TV One		
2021	Ishq-e-Laa	Dr. Azka Azlan	Hum TV		
2021	Sinf-e-Aahan	Shaista Khanzada	ARY Digital		
2021	Parizaad	Qurutulain / RJ Aini	Hum TV		
2022	Bakhtawar	Bakhtawar	Hum TV		
2022	Tere Bin	Meerab Murtasim Khan	Geo Entertainment		
2024	Gentleman	Zarnab	Green Entertainment		
2024	Qarz e Jaan	Nashwa Behzaad Ammar	Hum TV		
2026	Dekh Zara Pyar Se	Rumila	Hum TV	Ramadan Series	

=== Telefilms ===
Year	Title	Role	Network	Ref(s)
2014	Subah Be Daagh Hai	Ayesha	Hum TV	
2019	Shaadi Impossible	Raina	TV One	
2020	Raja Ki Raji	Haya	ARY Digital	

=== Other appearances ===
Year	Title	Role	Notes
2014	Shareek-e-Hayat	Recurring	Anthology romantic series, Episodic appearance
2014	Kitni Girhain Baaki Hain	Recurring	Anthology series
2017	Mehmaan Qadardan	Herself	Special appearance
2017	Jago Pakistan Jago	Herself	Guest appearance with Dar Si Jaati Hai Sila team for promotion of the project
2017	Mazaaq Raat	Herself	Guest appearance with Abdullah Ejaz

== Awards and nominations ==
Year	Award	Category	Work	Result	Ref
2014	2nd Hum Awards	Best Supporting Actress	Ullu Baraye Farokht Nahi	Nominated	
2014	2nd Hum Awards	Best Actress - Jury	Rishtay Kuch Adhooray Se	Nominated	
2014	2nd Hum Awards	Best Actress - Popular	Rishtay Kuch Adhooray Se	Nominated	
2015	3rd Hum Awards	Best Actor in a Negative Role	Mausam	Nominated	
2016	4th Hum Awards	Best Actress - Jury	Jugnoo	Nominated	
2016	4th Hum Awards	Best Actress - Popular	Jugnoo	Nominated	
2018	6th Hum Awards	Best On-screen Couple - Jury (with Ahmed Ali Akbar)	Yeh Raha Dil	Nominated	
2018	6th Hum Awards	Best On-screen Couple - Popular (with Ahmed Ali Akbar)	Yeh Raha Dil	Nominated	
2019	7th Hum Awards	Best Actress - Jury	Dar Si Jaati Hai Sila	Won	
2019	7th Hum Awards	Best Actress - Popular	Dar Si Jaati Hai Sila	Nominated	
2019	7th Hum Awards	Best On-screen Couple - Jury (with Osama Tahir)	Dar Si Jaati Hai Sila	Nominated	
2019	7th Hum Awards	Best On-screen Couple - Popular (with Osama Tahir)	Dar Si Jaati Hai Sila	Nominated	
2020	19th Lux Style Awards	Best Actress (Viewers' Choice)	Inkaar	Won	
2021	20th Lux Style Awards	Best Actress (Critics' Choice)	Pyar Ke Sadqay	Won	
2021	20th Lux Style Awards	Best Actress (Viewers' Choice)	Pyar Ke Sadqay	Won	
2021	20th Lux Style Awards	Best Actress (Viewers' Choice)	Raaz-e-Ulfat	Nominated	
2022	21st Lux Style Awards	Best Actress (Critics' Choice)	Dil Na Umeed To Nahi	Nominated	
2022	21st Lux Style Awards	Best Actress (Viewers' Choice)	Dil Na Umeed To Nahi	Nominated	
2022	8th Hum Awards	Best On-screen Couple - Jury (with Ahmed Ali Akbar)	Parizaad	Nominated	
2022	8th Hum Awards	Best On-screen Couple - Popular (with Ahmed Ali Akbar)	Parizaad	Nominated	
2023	22nd Lux Style Awards	Best Actress (Critics' Choice)	Bakhtawar	Won	
2023	22nd Lux Style Awards	Best Actress (Viewers' Choice)	Bakhtawar	Won	
2023	5th International Pakistan Prestige Awards	Best TV Actor Female	Bakhtawar	Nominated	
2024	9th Hum Awards	Best Actress - Popular	Bakhtawar	Won	
2024	9th Hum Awards	Most Impactful Character	Bakhtawar	Nominated	
2024	9th Hum Awards	Best Actress - Popular	Ishq-e-Laa	Nominated	
2024	9th Hum Awards	Best On-screen Couple (with Azaan Sami Khan)	Ishq-e-Laa	Nominated	
2025	23rd Lux Style Awards	Best Actress (Critics' Choice)	Tere Bin	Nominated	
2025	23rd Lux Style Awards	Best Actress (Viewers' Choice)	Tere Bin	Won	
2025	South Asian International Film Festival Florida	Best Actress	Nayab	Won	
2025	24th Lux Style Awards	Film Actor of the Year - Female	Nayab	Won	
2026	3rd Pakistan International Screen Awards	Best Actress - Film	Nayab	Nominated	
2026	3rd Pakistan International Screen Awards	Best TV Actress (Critics' Choice)	Gentleman	Nominated	
