= Ishq Zahe Naseeb =

Pakistani television series

- Left to right: Zarnish Khan, Sonya Hussain, Zahid Ahmed, Sami Khan, Yumna Zaidi, Khalid Malik
- Genre: Drama Mystery Romance drama Psychological Thriller
- Written by: Hashim Nadeem
- Directed by: Farooq Rind
- Starring: Zahid Ahmed; Yumna Zaidi; Sami Khan; Sonya Hussain; Zarnish Khan
- Theme music composer: Naveed Nashad
- Opening theme: "Ishq Zahe Naseeb"; Singer; Naveed Nashad; Lyrics by Hashim Nadeem
- Country of origin: Pakistan
- No. of seasons: 01
- No. of episodes: 30

Production
- Producers: Momina Duraid; Moomal Shunaid
- Production companies: MD Productions; Moomal Entertainment

Original release
- Network: Hum TV
- Release: 21 June 2019 – 17 January 2020

Ishq Zahe Naseeb (Urdu: عشق زہے نصیب, lit. 'Love, My Good Luck') is a Pakistani mystery drama television series co-produced by Momina Duraid and Moomal Shunaid under MD Productions and Moomal Entertainment, which started on Hum TV on 21 June 2019. The series focuses on dissociative identity disorder, portrayed by Zahid Ahmed along with Sonya Hussain, Sami Khan, Zarnish Khan with Khalid Malik and Jinaan Hussain in pivotal roles. It also has Yumna Zaidi and Azekah Daniel in an extended cameo appearance. The series received critical praise, with Ahmed and Zaidi both noted for their performances, especially Ahmed's performance. At the 19th Lux Style Awards, the series received six nominations, winning an award of Best Actor - Critics for Ahmed.

== Plot ==
Gohar is a happy girl from a poor family who is in love with a boy named Kashif. Kashif too is serious about her, and they both intend to marry each other. However, they are seen together by Gohar's brother Saleem, which creates problems for her. Consequently, she is forced to accept the proposal of a nasty cousin, Jahangir, because her father, Rasheed, owes Jahangir's family money. Gohar and Kashif, on her sister's advice, decide to elope, but on the day of, both return halfway due to not wanting to hurt their own families. They avoid contact with each other completely, with Gohar thinking she betrayed Kashif and Kashif thinking he betrayed Gohar.

Meanwhile, Sameer is a wealthy, handsome, and young businessman who endured a traumatic childhood. After his mother abandoned him and his father died soon after, he was then raised by his greedy, abusive stepmother, Sabiha. Due to his traumatic childhood, he developed dissociative identity disorder, which he and Sabiha have kept a secret. He had been engaged to a girl named Zoya, whom he loved and hoped would help him get over his issues, but she died after being shoved off the balcony by Sameer's alternate personality, Sameera, who takes control of his mind after sunset.

Gohar’s sister, Bushra, works as a receptionist at Sameer's office, and Gohar takes her place when Bushra gets married and resigns. She is instead hired as a governess at Sameer’s house, where Sabiha grows fond of her. Gohar doesn't tell her family that she is working at Sameer's house instead of his office and keeps it a secret as she doesn't want any obligations and to avoid problems. Jahangir eventually finds out and tells her family, who bar her from working anymore.

Sameer, realizing that his mother has adapted to Gohar's way of managing the house, goes to her house to request her to rejoin. When he learns of the family's debt and Jahangir's pressure on the family, he writes her a blank cheque in the hope that it will persuade her to come back and help his mother. Gohar refuses to take the cheque but agrees to return to her job; but Saleem accepts the cheque and withdraws the money, which was twice the amount the loan was for. He repays the loan and keeps the rest for himself. He breaks Jahangir and Gohar's engagement.

Jahangir chooses to take revenge for the breakup by throwing acid on Gohar's face, but he fails to cause damage. He is jailed but is later released on bail.

Meanwhile, Kashif secures a good position in Sameer's top rival company, "Jabbar Group of Companies", and starts earning well. His boss Duniya is a wheelchair user and is a bitter person due to past experiences. Kashif slowly helps her mend her trust and bring back her liveliness, and with this newfound willpower, she is able to walk again. Their relationship blossoms, as does Sameer and Gohars.

Sabiha, fearing that Gohar is trying to trap Sameer, fires her as governess. In retaliation, Sameer gives her a position in his office to work on an upcoming project with Duniya's company. A subsequent meeting between the two companies leads to Gohar meeting Kashif after a long time. But neither of them speak about their failed attempt to marry each other.

Sabiha learns that Gohar is working at Sameer's office and arrives. She humiliates and demeans Gohar, hoping she will quit and leave. In an attempt to save Gohar's respect, Sameer announces his engagement to Gohar, silencing his mother. Later, during a dinner, he tells Gohar that he truly likes her and formally proposes to her. Gohar accepts the proposal, after seeing Kashif behind Sameer. This is witnessed by Kashif and Duniya who happened to be there. Sameer comes to Gohar's house with his proposal, and on her family's acceptance, gets engaged to her. On the other hand, the same day, Kashif gets engaged to Duniya.

Saleem meets secretly with Sameer and gives him a list of materialistic things he wants under the pretense that it's for Gohar’s security, in exchange for Gohar’s wedding with him. Sameer agrees on the condition that after the wedding, Saleem and his family should maintain no contact with Gohar whatsoever, stating that the reason Sameer was his mother being class-conscious, and he and Gohar have a difference in status, so he didn't want to have problems regarding it. Saleem reluctantly agrees.

Gohar marries Sameer, and on their wedding night, she comes face-to-face with Sameera. At a hospital, she also discovers Sameer’s real mother, Suraiya, now in a vegetative state, who was presumed dead by Sabiha. Following her, she finds out her brother is Akbar, a cook who works at Sameer’s house. He tells her that Sabiha drove Suraiya out of the house after accusing her of cheating on her husband and leading everyone to believe she died. Gohar meets with Sameer's doctor, who tells her about his mental illnesses, dissociative identity disorder and hallucinations (PTSD).

A series of flashbacks show the story of a woman named Shakra, a maid at Sameer's house. Ehsaan, Sameer's father, has a son with Shakra. The boy was ordered to be killed, and Shakra became disturbed, mentally. She was expelled from the house. A few years later, Ehsaan threw his wife, Suraiya, out of the house, accusing her of cheating on him, and married Sabiha, who worked as a secretary in his office. Shakra returns from the mental asylum and poisons Ehsaan as revenge. Shakra returns to work in the house.

Sabiha starts to lock both Sameer and Shakra in the house's basement. While Shakra looks after Sameer due to her own mental health issue, she poisons Sameer against men. Shakra starts to obsess over Sameer and begins putting makeup on him and calling him Sameera, which develops his disorder. She sexually abuses (rapes) young Sameer too. An adult Sameer develops a female alter-ego “Sameera” as a result of this abuse. He internalized “Shakra” and his version became “Sameera.” One day, Sabiha discovers Shakra’s sexual abuse and has her arrested and jailed. She comes to visit Shakra, presumably when she discovers Sameer's disorder. Shakra tells her how she killed Ehsaan but makes Sabiha promise not to tell Sameer because she didn't want him to hate her. Later, a flashback shows that her baby was not killed but was taken by Ehsaan's bodyguard.

It is revealed that Shakra is the illusion Sameer sees, and who he imagines himself as once he becomes Sameera.

A maid at the house, Noora, witnesses Akbar putting arsenic in Sabiha's food, poisioning her slowly. Akbar is arrested but is later bailed out by Gohar.

Gohar and Sabiha get into an unseen fight, causing them to both leave the house. Gohar leaves Sameer a note, asking him to visit the old home where his real mother is. When he arrives, he comes face to face with Akbar, who tells him the truth about his mother. Akbar takes Sameer to go see Suraiya, but before Sameer can meet her, she dies.

On the other hand, Duniya loses trust in Kashif after discovering him and Gohar together.

Jahangir meets with Sabiha at her request to discuss how to separate Gohar and Sameer. As a part of the plan, he meets with Sameer and sends him pictures of Gohar with Kashif, leading Sameer to believe Gohar truly is unfaithful and after his money. That night, Sameer is completely disturbed, as his two personalities clash for control of his mind. Gohar tearfully watches Sameera apply makeup, which Sameer wipes away. Sameer takes a gun, points a gun at Gohar, and then at himself, in an attempt to get rid and take revenge from his alter, Sameera. Gohar attempts to take the gun away from him, but a shot is fired during the struggle. It is revealed that Sameer had been shot, and he is hospitalized while Gohar, due to Sabiha calling the police, is arrested.

When Sameer gains consciousness, he gives a statement to the police. He tells them that Gohar hadn't tried to kill him; he tried to take his own life. He also admits to pushing Zoya off the balcony in his house under the control of Sameera, which led to Zoya's death. Gohar is released from jail due to Sameer's statement, and the court rules Sameer innocent for Zoya's murder due to his mental illness and asks him to enter a facility for treatment. Jahangir is revealed to be imprisoned for his crimes, while Sabiha takes her own life.

Sameer wants to set Gohar free by divorcing her. When Gohar comes to visit him, he asks her if she had signed the divorce papers, to which Gohar shakes her head. Sameer later demands she leaves. Gohar does so, and later meets with Zoya’s cousin Saima, who, although she doesn’t forgive Sameer for Zoya's death, doesn't take action for Gohar's sake.

Duniya and Kashif reunite. Gohar blesses them, and their misconceptions are cleared.

Years later, a mentally stable and healed Sameer reunites with Gohar at a bazaar. The two smile at each other, lovingly.

== Cast ==
- Zahid Ahmed as Sameer/Sameera (Sameera is his female personality counterpart, as he has dissociative identity disorder)
- Sonya Hussain as Gauhar Rasheed, ex-partner of Kashif and wife of Sameer
- Sami Khan as Kashif, ex-partner of Gauhar and husband of Donia
- Zarnish Khan as Donia, fiancé of Kashif
- Yumna Zaidi as Shakra, Sameer's maid during his childhood and his split personality character. (Extended Cameo appearance)
- Jinaan Hussain as Bushra, Gauhar's sister
- Azekah Daniel as Zoya, ex-fiancé of Sameer (Guest Appearance)
- Ismat Zaidi as Sabiha, Sameer's step-mother
- Khalid Malik as Jehangir, Gauhar's ex-fiancé
- Humaira Bano as Gohar's mother
- Beena Chaudhary as Kashif's mother
- Akbar Subhani as Khursheed, Gohar's father
- Saad Azhar as Saleem, Gohar’s brother
- Hajra Khan as Zakiya, Saleem's wife
- Ghazala Butt as Gohar's aunt and Jehangir’s mother
- Akbar Islam as Qayyum, Jehangir's father
- Raeed Muhammad Alam as Farhan, Donia's ex-fiance
- Manzoor Qureshi as Mr. Jabbar, Donia's father and Kashif's boss
- Aliya Jamshed as Bushra's mother-in-law
- Rabab Zaidi as Sabiha (young)

== Production ==
To portray the victim of a dissociate personality disorder, Ahmed had to portray the female part, for which he was inspired by the Moin Akhtar's titular in Rozi.

=== Casting ===
The extended cameo role of Shakra before offered to Zaidi was earlier offered to Ayeza Khan, Neelam Muneer and Hiba Ali Khan, all of whom rejected it due to lesser screen time, being a cameo role. It was the fifth on-screen appearance of Ahmed and Zaidi after Jugnoo, Zara Yaad Kar, Pukaar, and Choti Choti Batain.

== Soundtrack ==
Ishq Zahe Naseeb - OST

Soundtrack album by Naveed Nashad
- Released: 24 May 2019
- Recorded: 2019
- Genre: Television soundtrack
- Length: 3:03
- Language: Urdu
- Label: Moomal Productions
- Producer: Moomal Shunaid

Music video
- "Ishq Zahe Naseeb" OST on YouTube

The official soundtrack of the serial has been composed and performed by Naveed Nashad while the lyrics were written by Hashim Nadeem.

== Reception ==
=== Critical reception ===
The series received critical acclaim due to its storyline and performances of the lead cast, especially Zahid Ahmed and Yumna Zaidi.

Ahmed's performance as a victim of split personality disorder was highly praised and well-received critically. Critics also praised the performance of Zaidi, who played the alter ego of the victim. Mysterious and thrilling storyline of the series and its portrayal about mental health were lauded heavily by critics. Express Tribune listed it among the dramas that broke the stereotypes due to the portrayal of taboo topics such as Acid attacks, split personality disorder, sexual abuse, and other mental issues. The Daily Times however commented on the storyline that it has normalised the rape.

=== Television ratings ===
The series mostly received 5-6 TRPs during its run.

== Awards and nominations ==
Year	Award Show	Category	Name	Result	Ref
7 February 2020	Pakistan International Screen Awards	Best Television Play	Moomal Productions	Nominated	
7 February 2020	Pakistan International Screen Awards	Best Television Actor	Zahid Ahmed	Nominated	
7 February 2020	Pakistan International Screen Awards	Best Television Actress Critics choice	Sonya Hussyn	Nominated	
31 December 2020	Lux Style Awards	Best TV Play	Moomal Productions	Nominated	
31 December 2020	Lux Style Awards	Best TV Director	Farooq Rind	Nominated	
31 December 2020	Lux Style Awards	Best Actor - Critics choice	Zahid Ahmed	Won	
31 December 2020	Lux Style Awards	Best Actor	Zahid Ahmed	Nominated	
31 December 2020	Lux Style Awards	Best Television Writer	Hashim Nadeem	Nominated	
31 December 2020	Lux Style Awards	Best Original Soundtrack	Naveed Nashad	Nominated	
