= Paras (serial) =

Pakistani television series

- Genre: Family drama Romance; Tragedy
- Written by: Rukhsana Nigar
- Directed by: Aamir Yousuf
- Starring: Yumna Zaidi; Sami Khan
- Country of origin: Pakistan
- Original language: Urdu
- No. of episodes: 46

Production
- Producer: Babar Javed
- Running time: approx. 18 minutes
- Production company: A&B Productions

Original release
- Network: Geo Entertainment
- Release: 13 August – 19 October 2015

Paras (Urdu: پارس) is a 2015 Pakistani television series produced by Babar Javed under the banner of A&B Productions. It stars Yumna Zaidi and Sami Khan in leads on their fourth on-screen appearance after Teri Raah Main Rul Gai, Meri Dulari, and Kaanch Ki Guriya. It was written by Rukhsana Nigar and directed by Aamir Yousuf.

== Plot ==
Aiman finds that her mother has been diagnosed with cancer. Her parents plan a trip to England for better medical treatment. Before their departure, they get their cheerful, carefree daughter engaged to Hammad, a good-looking boy in love with Aiman.

But fate has other plans for Aiman. Her parents' aeroplane crashes on their return flight from England. Aiman learns after her parents' death that she is now left with zero bank balance as her father had spent all his fortune on his beloved wife's treatment.

== Cast ==
- Yumna Zaidi as Aiman
- Sami Khan as Shehryar
- Ghazala Butt as Shehryar's sister
- Humaira Ali as Sabeen
- Firdous Jamal
- Harib Farooq as Hammad
- Zainab Jameel
- Saima Saleem
- Kinza Malik

== Soundtrack ==
The OST 'Paras Banaya' is sung by Nida Arab and composed by Waqar Ali.
