= Shaadi Impossible =

- Genre: Romantic comedy
- Written by: Adeel Razzaq
- Directed by: Mohsin Talat
- Starring: Saman Ansari; Yumna Zaidi; Affan Waheed
- Country of origin: Pakistan
- Original language: Urdu

Production
- Executive producer: Seema Taher Khan
- Producers: Ahmed Baig; Farhan Raza Sheikh
- Running time: 109 minutes

Original release
- Network: TVOne Pakistan
- Release: 5 June 2019

Shaadi Impossible (transl. Marriage Impossible) is a 2019 Pakistani romantic comedy television film aired on TVOne Pakistan on 5 June 2019. It stars Yumna Zaidi, Affan Waheed, Saman Ansari and Noman Masood in pivot roles.

== Plot ==
Raina's mother died when she was young and she is raised by her single father and paternal grand-mother. Raina refuses to marry after completing her studies, as a result of pressure from her family, she keeps some not so easy conditions for the marriage. The family arranged her appointment with Zaid, a well settled guy, whose mother is divorced. Whilst the families are happy with their relationship, Rania and Zaid decide to fake their relationship. After a series of consequences, it appears that marriage is fixed among their single parents Kabir and Mehar and not their kids.

== Cast ==
- Yumna Zaidi as Raina
- Affan Waheed as Zaid
- Saman Ansari as Meher; Zaid's mother
- Noman Masood as Kabir; Raima's father
- Ismat Zaidi as Bebo; Raima's grand-mother
- Benazir Khan as Ajiya; Zaid's cousin
- Aliya Jamshed as Zaid's aunt & Ajiya's mother
