= Mera Dard Bayzuban =

- Left to right: Ayesha Omer, Sonya Hussyn, Sidra Batool
- Genre: Soap opera Family drama Romantic drama
- Written by: Parisa Siddique
- Directed by: Mohsin Mirza
- Country of origin: Pakistan
- Original language: Urdu
- No. of episodes: 52

Production
- Camera setup: Multi-camera setup

Original release
- Network: Geo Kahani; Geo Tv
- Release: 15 August – 27 October 2016

Mera Dard Bayzuban (Urdu: میرا درد بے زبان) is a Pakistani television soap opera aired on Geo TV in 2016 . It stars Ayesha Omer, Sami Khan, Sonya Hussain and Sidra Batool. The show originally telecasted on Geo Kahani under the title Soha aur Savera.

== Plot ==
The story explores two different parts of society, one is extremely religious and the other ultra-modern, and how both stand proud and believe that they are right and the other one is on the wrong path and the common practice of society where people change their dreams, goals and themselves just for the sake of others, especially females who are constantly sacrificing their feelings to satisfy their loved ones. The two protagonist Soha & Sawera played by Ayesha Omer and Sonya Hussain respectively, had planned a successful bright future and have dreams to make it big in their own way but the reality is far from what they had hoped for.

== Cast ==
- Ayesha Omer as Soha
- Sami Khan as Faris
- Sonya Hussain as Savera
- Sidra Batool as Emaan
- Lubna Aslam
- Seemi Pasha
- Faizan Khawaja as Talal
- Imran Ashraf as Umair
- Uzma Tahir
- Hammad Faroqui
