= Guzaarish =

Guzaarish (lit. 'request') may refer to:

- Guzaarish (film), a 2010 Indian Hindi-language romantic drama film
- Guzaarish (TV series), a 2015 Pakistani television drama series
