= Malangi (drama) =

- Urdu: ملنگی
- Written by: Wasi Shah
- Directed by: Shahid Zahoor
- Starring: Nauman Ijaz; Nauman Masood; Mehmood Aslam
- Country of origin: Pakistan
- Original language: Urdu

Original release
- Network: PTV Home
- Release: 2006

Malangi is a Pakistani television drama serial that was broadcast on Pakistan Television (PTV). The drama was first broadcast in 2006 and starred Nauman Ijaz in the titular role of Malangi.

== Plot ==
Malangi is set against the backdrop of rural Punjab and explores themes of love, family relationships, traditional values, honour and social conflicts.

The story revolves around the central character Malangi, portrayed by Nauman Ijaz. The drama follows his life and relationships as he becomes involved in personal and social conflicts within the traditional rural setting. The interactions between the principal characters form the basis of the story.

== Cast ==
- Nauman Ijaz as Malangi
- Nauman Masood as Dosu
- Mehmood Aslam as Malik
- Beenish Chohan as Maryam
- Sara Chaudhry
- Sohail Ahmed as Chaudhry Akram
- Masood Akhtar
- Saba Faisal
- Zara Akbar
- Fariha Jabeen
- Abid Kashmiri
- Ashraf Rahi

== Production ==
- Directed by: Shahid Zahoor
- Written by: Wasi Shah
- Production network: Pakistan Television (PTV)
- Language: Urdu
- Country: Pakistan
- Year: 2006

The drama is credited to director Shahid Zahoor and writer Wasi Shah in available television records.

== Awards ==
Malangi received several nominations at the Lux Style Awards. At the 6th Lux Style Awards, Nauman Ijaz won the award for Best PTV Actor for his performance in Malangi. The drama was also associated with nominations for Best PTV Play, Best PTV Director and Best PTV Actress.
