= Aap Ki Kaneez =

- Written by: Faiza Iftikhar
- Directed by: Amir Yousaf
- Starring: Alyy Khan; Shamim Hilaly; Atiqa Odho; Yumna Zaidi; Zalay Sarhadi
- Country of origin: Pakistan
- Original language: Urdu
- No. of episodes: 26

Production
- Running time: 30–45 minutes

Original release
- Network: Geo Entertainment
- Release: 15 September 2014 – 23 March 2015

Aap ki Kaneez is a 2015 Pakistani drama serial originally aired on Geo Entertainment from 15 September 2014 to 23 March 2015 for twenty-six episodes. It was directed by Amir Yousaf, written by Faiza Iftikhar, and stars Alyy Khan, Shamim Hilaly, Atiqa Odho, and Yumna Zaidi in pivotal roles. At the 15th Lux Style Awards, it received a Best TV Director nomination for Amir Yousaf. It later aired on GEO Kahani. It is also available on Amazon Prime Video since late 2019.

== Synopsis ==
Aap Ki Kaneez revolves around a wealthy businessperson, Shah Mir Afandi, who lost his wife, Shireen, while giving birth to their daughter Parniyan twelve years ago. However, Shah Mir's love for his wife is alive. He never forgets to celebrate their wedding anniversary. Despite Shireen being a divorcee and the mother of a thirteen-year-old boy earlier, Shah Mir was unaffected by her past. Shireen's death leaves an unimaginable void in Shah Mir's life. However, his life turns upside down when a failed kidnapping attempt is made against him.

A kidnapping encounter against Shah Mir forces him to marry his servant's daughter, Kaneez, who is half his age and is uneducated. Reluctant to inform his family about his relationship with Kaneez, things slowly escalate in a series of consequences as Kaneez tries to oblige everyone through her actions.

Will Kaneez sacrifice everything to adjust to her new household?

== Cast ==
- Alyy Khan as Shah Mir Afandi
- Shamim Hilaly as Amma Jee
- Atiqa Odho as Shireen
- Yumna Zaidi as Kaneez
- Sohail Asghar as Maali Baba
- Farah Nadir as Aruj
- Gul-e-Rana
- Ayesha Toor as Safeena
- Mohammad Ali Khan
- Zainab Jameel as Arzoo
- Iman

== Soundtrack ==
The original soundtrack of Aap Ki Kaneez is composed by Ahsan Ali Taj while the lyrics and vocals are provided by Rahat Inayat Ali.

== Awards and nominations ==
Award	Category	Recipient(s) and nominee(s)	Result	Ref(s)
15th Lux Style Awards	Best Television Director	Aamir Yousuf	Nominated	
