= Noman Masood =

Pakistani actor

- نعمان مسعود
- Born: 28 May 1968 (age 58); Lahore, Punjab, Pakistan
- Occupations: Actor; Producer; Composer
- Years active: 1993–Present
- Height: 5 ft 11 in (180 cm)

Noman Masood (Punjabi, Urdu: نعمان مسعود; born 28 May 1968) is a Pakistani actor, composer and producer. He has worked in many PTV dramas, and has been active in the field for over three decades.

== Career ==
=== Actor ===
Masood began his acting career in 1993 with PTV's Shahbaz, where he played a martial arts trainer. He rose to fame in 1996 with the PTV classic Bandhan co-starring Nadia Khan. He played the villain for the first time in Inkaar (2000). In 2002, he played a dutiful and honest police officer in Zafar Mairaj-written Wardi.

=== Producer ===
Masood has his own production house called NaughtyForty Productions.

=== Business interests ===
Masood has shifted from Karachi, where he had stayed for his professional work, back to Islamabad, where he operates a restaurant, Khaaba, with his family.

== Selected filmography ==
=== Films ===
Year	Title	Role	Director
2002	Fire	Bilal	Asif Ali Pota
2019	Sach	Waheed	Zulfiqar Sheikh

=== Television series ===
Year	Title	Role	Producer	Network	Ref(s).
1993	Shahbaz	Dawoodi		PTV	
1996	Bandhan	Asad		PTV	
1996	Aahan	Ali		PTV	
2000	Inkaar	Prince		PTV	
2001	Wardi	Ayaz		PTV	
2006	Malangi	Dosu		PTV	
2006	Kuch Dil Ne Kaha	Kabeer		Geo Entertainment	
2011	Meray Khwab Raiza Raiza	Mir Sikandar Ali		Hum TV	
2012	Meri Behan Meri Dewrani	Adnan		Hum TV	
2012	Maseeha	Basit Ali		Hum TV	
2013	Ullu Baraye Farokht Nahi	Wali Mohammad	Yes	Hum TV	
2016	Khwab Saraye	Waheed		Hum TV	
2016–2017	Dil Banjaara	No	Yes	Hum TV	
2017	Kitni Girhain Baaki Hain	Humayun		Hum TV	Episode 24
2017	Khan	Yaqoob		Geo Entertainment	
2017–18	Adhoora Bandhan	Yasir		Geo Entertainment	
2017–18	Zamani Manzil Kay Maskharay	Rafaqat	Yes	Geo Entertainment	
2018	Teri Meri Kahani	Nawaz		Hum TV	
2018–19	Baandi	Ali Faizan		Hum TV	
2022–23	Meri Shehzadi	Salahuddin		Hum TV	
2024–25	Tan Man Neelo Neel	Ehsan		Hum TV	
2025	Dua Aur Azan			Hum TV	
2026	Marg E Wafa	Suleiman		Hum TV	
2026	Captain Asfandyar Bukhari	Dr Fayyaz		Geo Entertainment	
2026	Hey Fam	Mr.Ansari		ARY Digital	
2026	Aap Ki Izzat	Chaudhry Jabbar		Hum TV	

=== Telefilms ===
Year	Title	Role	Network
2013	Miyan Biwi Aur Woh	Kashan	Hum TV
2018	Band Tou Bajega	Jahanzaib	Hum TV
2019	Shaadi Impossible	Kabir Ahmed	TVOne

== Awards and nominations ==
Year	Award	Category	Work	Result	Ref
2014	13th Lux Style Awards	Best Television Play - Satellite	Ullu Baraye Farokht Nahi	Nominated	
