= Ghaao =

Pakistani television production

- Genre: Romance; Drama
- Written by: Faiza Iftikhar
- Directed by: Aamir Yousuf
- Starring: Sami Khan; Fiza Ali; Samina Peerzada
- Country of origin: Pakistan
- Original language: Urdu

Production
- Running time: 40–45 minutes

Original release
- Network: Geo Tv

Ghaao (Urdu: گھاؤ, lit. 'Wound') was a 2013 Pakistani romantic drama serial broadcast on Geo TV. The serial was written by Faiza Iftikhar and directed by Aamir Yousuf, starring Sami Khan, Fiza Ali, and Samina Peerzada.

== Cast ==
- Sami Khan as Mohid
- Fiza Ali as Alizeh
- Samina Peerzada as Zarqa
- Faiza Jaffery as Areesha
- Saniya Shamshad as Aleesha
- Faiza Gillani as Rosie
- Asma Abbas as Alizeh's mother

== Synopsis ==
Ghaao is crammed with conflict between real and step blood relationships with an assortment of Love and revenge. Alizeh and Areesha live with their mother Naseema who is not in an exceedingly good state of health with respect to her psychological condition.

Alizeh realizes her responsibility and is supporting the family. She meets a psychiatrist named Mohid and they become friends. Mohid tries to help Naseema and Alizeh when he understands what state of affairs they are currently in. Mohid and Alizeh begin to like each other and eventually marry.

On the opposite hand Areesha is immature and less wise than her sister. She is trapped in an affair with a dangerous man.

Mohid's mother Zarqa is ruthless and cold-hearted. She is married to Sajjad who is currently paralyzed.

Zarqa tries to stop Mohid from marrying Alizeh, however Mohid doesn't listen to her. After Alizeh marries Mohid she experiences flashbacks which hold a certain mystery and holds the key to her past which is not thus pleasant.
