= Kaanch Ki Guriya =

Pakistani television series

- Genre: Family drama
- Written by: Faiza Iftikhar
- Directed by: Nadeem Siddiqui
- Starring: Sami Khan; Yumna Zaidi
- Country of origin: Pakistan
- Original language: Urdu
- No. of seasons: 01
- No. of episodes: 31

Production
- Producers: Asif Raza Mir; Babar Javed
- Production location: Pakistan
- Editors: Fawad Khan; M Abbas Naqvi
- Running time: Approx 40 Minutes
- Production company: A&B Entertainment

Original release
- Network: Geo Entertainment
- Release: 30 March – 9 November 2015

Kaanch Ki Guriya (transl. Crystal Doll) is a 2015 Pakistani drama serial directed by Nadeem Siddiqui, produced by Asif Raza Mir and Babar Javed under their production banner A&B Entertainment and written by Faiza Iftikhar. It focuses on the lives of middle-class girls being clear like glasses and feeling broken due to severe sufferings of life, just like the glass breaks if fallen, particularly revolves around Manaal (Yumna Zaidi) and her sufferings of life being an orphan.

The drama stars Sami Khan and Yumna Zaidi in their third on-screen appearance after Teri Raah Main Rul Gai and Meri Dulari. The drama was first aired on 30 March 2015 on Geo TV.

== Synopsis ==
Manaal is a young woman with loving parents who is attending nursing school. Tragedy strikes when she loses both parents, finds out who her surviving relatives are and goes to live with them, but she suffers even more devastating events at their hands. On her way to finally maturing and learning about life, Daim (her grandfather's right-hand man) guides her with lessons to achieving her rightful place in her family and ultimately finding love.

Though Manaal (also known as Gurya/Guriya, which translates to Doll in English) grows up in a poor household with limited resources, her parents' love for her and each other conquers everything else. However, Manaal's world comes crashing down when her parents die in two separate incidents. Shattered by the loss, Manaal faces the harsh realities of life when everyone refuses to take responsibility for her, and she is left completely abandoned.

Manaal's aunt, Shabnam, comes to her rescue by taking her in, but soon Manaal finds out things aren't what they seem. Fortunately, at great risk to herself, Shabnam sends Gurya/Guriya off to her grandfather, a rich industrialist in Karachi. Manaal is surprised to see the rich and lavish lifestyle of her mother's family. She is overwhelmed and intimidated by everyone in the house. But under Daim's supervision, Manaal tries to befriend everyone by caring for them.

Often in these attempts, she is humiliated and looked down upon or made to feel inadequate. Amidst this, Manaal meets Daim who was adopted by the family when he was young. Manaal and Daim's mutual interests lead them to fall in love, and their affection for each other grows. However, once again, Manaal's life is struck by tragedy when her grandfather passes away, and she has to return to her Aunt Shabnam's. But the condition put on both Manaal and Shabnam is that she must first marry her scheming cousin, Shujaat. Fearing for Manaal's safety, Shabnam agrees to her son's plan. The situation spirals downward when Shujaat uses his position to make Manaal suffer for perceived slights and out of sheer spite. Under her husband's abusive behaviour, Manaal begins to lose all faith. Meanwhile, Daim, who disappeared after his adopted father's death, faces difficulty forgetting Manaal. Will destiny bring Manaal and Daim together, or will they continue to suffer without each other?

== Cast ==
- Sami Khan as Daim
- Yumna Zaidi as Manaal
- Zainab Qayyum as Shabnam
- Qavi Khan as Grandfather
- Behroze Sabzwari as Karim
- Salma Zafar as Tasneem
- Jinaan Hussain as Joya
- Hina Khawaja Bayat as Naila
- Farah Shah as Joya's mother
- Lubna Aslam as Saliha
- Qaiser Naqvi as Saliha's mother
- Shezeen Rahat as Baila
- Bilal Qureshi as Shujaat
- Hareb Farooq as Moeed

== Soundtrack ==
The original soundtrack for Kaanch Ki Guriya was composed by Waqar Ali and sung by Alycia Dias.
