= Saas Bahu =

Pakistani television series

- Opening title of serial
- Genre: Social drama
- Written by: Zahid Khan
- Directed by: Syed Ramish Rizvi
- Starring: Saman Ansari; Sajida Syed; Erum Azam; Salma Zafar; Hassaan Ahmed
- Country of origin: Pakistan
- Original language: Urdu
- No. of episodes: 20

Production
- Producers: Asif Raza Mir; Babar Javed
- Camera setup: Multi-camera setup
- Production company: A&B Entertainment

Original release
- Network: Geo Entertainment
- Release: 20 August 2015 – 7 January 2016

Saas Bahu is a Pakistani drama series, produced by Asif Raza Mir and Babar Javed under their production banner A&B Entertainment. The drama aired weekly on Geo Entertainment every Thursday from August 2015 to January 2016. It stars Hassaan Ahmed, Saman Ansari and Sajida Syed in lead roles.

== Plot ==
Saas Bahu lays emphasis on the harsh reality of society where women often destroy harmony in not only their own life but also in the lives encircling them. It touches upon the fact that at times, close relations become the reason of distress in the lives of a happily married couple.

Part of this drama serial also indicates that most of the miseries men go through in life are due to the politics women play in their lives. It captures the antics and politics women involve themselves in.

The writer's work seems to be influenced with the saying: "Men can hurt my body, but women scar my soul", which is said to be experience by all but denied by many.

== Cast ==
- Saman Ansari
- Hassaan Ahmed as Farooq
- Sajida Syed
- Salma Zafar
- Omer Shahzad as Waqar
- Asim Mehmood as Furqan
- Munawwar Saeed
- Erum Azam

== Production ==
Serial was initially titled as Dil Aashna Hai, but later changed by makers. The shooting of the serial took place in Karachi. It is directed by Syed Ramish Rizvi who direct serials like Meri Maa and Choti Choti Khushiyaan which were also produced by A&B Entertainment. It is the first time Saman Ansari played the lead.
