= Mausam (TV series) =

Pakistani television series

- Genre: Romance
- Created by: Momina Duraid
- Written by: Aliya Bukhari
- Directed by: Romi Inshah
- Starring: Ahsan Khan; Hareem Farooq; Yumna Zaidi; Shazia Naz; Yasir Mazher; Ahsan Farooq (To see the entire cast see the section of cast below)
- Opening theme: "Mausam"
- Ending theme: "Mausam"
- Country of origin: Pakistan
- Original language: Urdu
- No. of seasons: 20

Production
- Producer: Momina Duraid
- Production location: Karachi
- Editor: Jamil Awan
- Production company: Momina Duraid Productions

Original release
- Network: Hum TV
- Release: 23 May – 28 November 2014

Mausam (Urdu: موسم, lit: Weather) is a Pakistan television drama serial that aired on Hum TV in 2014. Produced by Momina Duraid and written by Aliya Bukhari, it is based on the theme of love and jealousy. It stars Ahsan Khan, Hareem Farooq and Yumna Zaidi.

== Synopsis ==
This drama shows the relationship between two cousins (Shazia and Saman) who belong to a middle-class family. They live in the same home and get on well with each other. Things take a turn for the worse when they come across the affluent bachelor Hashir. Shazia (Yumna) is more ambitious and materialistic, and is keen on marrying Hashir for his wealth but he falls in love with Saman because of her docile and modest nature. This sets off a series of manipulations by Shazia as she tries to win over Hashir by keeping him away from Saman. Somehow, Shazia convinces Hashir to fall for her tricks and they get together whilst simultaneously hiding a relationship with Faisal. Yet truth prevails in the end and Shazia decides to leave Saman and Hashir alone.

== Cast ==
- Ahsan Khan as Hashir
- Hareem Farooq as Saman
- Yumna Zaidi as Shazia
- Humaira Zaheer as Shazia's mother
- Annie Zaidi as Lubna
- Shazia Naz as Mehreen
- Ahsan Farooq
- Yasir Mazhar as Faisal
- Naila Jaffri as Saman's mother

== Accolades ==
Year	Award	Category	Recipient(s)	Result	Refs
2015	Hum Awards	Best Drama Serial Popular	Momina Duraid	Nominated	
2015	Hum Awards	Best Actor Serial	Ahsan Khan	Won	
2015	Hum Awards	Best Television Sensation Female	Hareem Farooq	Won	
