= Jaal (TV series) =

Pakistani television series

- Written by: Seema Munaf
- Directed by: Mohsin Talat
- Starring: Imran Ashraf; Sumbul Iqbal; Ali Kazmi; Sukaina Khan
- Opening theme: "Kaisa Hai Mera Naseeb" by Amanat Ali
- Country of origin: Pakistan
- Original language: Urdu
- No. of episodes: 32

Production
- Producers: Momina Duraid; Moomal Shunaid
- Camera setup: Multi-camera setup
- Production companies: MD Productions; Moomal Entertainment

Original release
- Network: Hum TV
- Release: 1 March – 11 October 2019

Jaal (transl. Trap) is a Pakistani Urdu-language drama television series premiered on 1 March 2019 on Hum TV. It is co-produced by Momina Duraid and Moomal Shunaid under their banner MD Productions and Moomal Entertainment. It stars Imran Ashraf, Sumbul Iqbal, Ali Kazmi and Sukaina Khan in leading roles.

== Plot ==
Esha is career woman married to her co-worker Arsal, her subordinate who insecure of her escalating career relative to his dampening profile both in the office and the family. Esha's sister, Zonia, turn the tables when she embarks on an illicit relationship with Arsal, eventually marrying him, leaving Esha on the verge of a heart-wrenching divorce as both families suffer. When all blood relations turn cold, Esha's mother, makes a will to Esha before dying, asking her to marry Arsal's younger brother Zaid who secretly loves her.

== Cast ==
- Imran Ashraf as Zaid Arshad
- Sumbul Iqbal as Esha Jameel
- Ali Kazmi as Arsal Arshad
- Sukaina Khan as Zonia
- Ismat Zaidi as Sakina Jameel, Esha, Zonia and Asad's mother (dead)
- Khalid Anam as Jameel Siddiqui (dead)
- Anam Tanveer as Sherina, Asad's wife
- Naveed Raza as Asad, Esha and Zonia's elder brother
- Shabbir Jan as Arshad Ahmed
- Farah Nadeem as Tehmina Arshad, Arsal's mother
- Asma Omer Khan as Amber, Arsal and Zaid's sister

== Reception ==
Jaal was one of the most popular dramas of Hum TV during its run. Each episode has more than or near 1 million views. The first episode had over 2.1 million views. The show also received high TRPs and became a slot leader, and received 7.3 TRPs at its highest followed by a TRPs of 7.2.
