= Lashkara =

2018 Pakistani television series

- Genre: Drama; Romance
- Written by: Zafar Mairaj
- Directed by: Kashif Nisar
- Starring: Ushna Shah; Mohsin Abbas Haider; Imran Ashraf
- Country of origin: Pakistan
- Original languages: Urdu; Punjabi
- No. of episodes: 27

Production
- Producers: Humayun Saeed; Shahzad Nasib
- Running time: approx. 30-40 minutes
- Production company: Six Sigma Plus

Original release
- Network: ARY Digital
- Release: 3 April – 28 October 2018

Lashkara(Urdu: لشکارا) is a Pakistani drama serial that originally started airing on ARY Digital from 3 April 2018. It is written by Zafar Mairaj, directed by Kashif Nisar, and stars Ushna Shah, Mohsin Abbas Haider and Imran Ashraf. The series is set in the Walled City of Lahore.

It stars Ushna Shah and Imran Ashraf in their second on-screen appearance together after Alif Allah Aur Insaan while Kinza Malik and Noorul Hassan in their fourth on-screen appearance after Sammi, Alif Allah Aur Insaan, and Dar Si Jaati Hai Sila.

== Plot ==
Manira and Rasheed are brothers who live in the Walled City of Lahore with their families. Manira's daughter, Bubbly, takes great pride in her beauty and always pays attention to her looks and appearance, while Rasheed's daughter, Saima, is fond of studying and works hard at her studies, motivated by her mother. Nasreen Chaudhary, an old neighbour of the family who moves away from their neighbourhood after becoming wealthy, brings a marriage proposal of her son, Feeka, for Bubbly after learning about her son's one-sided love for her. Nasreen promises to give a shop to Bubbly's gambler brother, Bala, and the marriage is arranged. After the wedding, Feeka reveals that he has always been in love with Bubbly when she used to buy pakoras from his cart. He also shows her the mementos and other items he had kept with him making Bubbly fall in love with him. Feeka's sister, Nikki, holds a grudge against Bubbly because she once rejected one of Nikki's beloveds, which ultimately led to his death. Nikki devises a plan to throw Bubbly out of the house. One night, she uses Bubbly's phone to message Sunny, Bubbly's neighbour and admirer, and then takes her mothee there. Bubbly is subsequently accused of wrongdoing, but Nasreen forbids everyone from telling Feeka about the incident, knowing that he would be deeply hurt. However, one day during a fit of fury, Nikki eventually reveals the entire incident to Feeka. Unable to believe Bubbly's explanation, he throws her out of the house. He later brings her back after they unexpectedly encounter each other at a shrine. Following Bubbly's return, Nikki and Nasreen plan to arrange Feeka's second marriage, but he refuses to agree. When Bubbly learns about their intentions, she returns to her parents' home and demands a divorce. Despite her parents' best efforts to persuade her to reconcile with Feeka, she remains firm in her decision telling them the reason that she does not like him as her husband.

== Cast ==
- Ushna Shah as Amber Parveen "Bubbly"
- Imran Ashraf as Salman "Sunny" Khan
- Mohsin Abbas Haider as Chaudhary Rafiq "Feeka"
- Saba Hameed as Nasreen Chaudhary
- Anam Tanveer as Saima
- Mehar Bano as Nikki
- Saba Faisal as Kulsoom
- Kinza Malik as Farzana
- Noor ul Hassan as Munir "Manira"
- Umer Darr as Iqbal "Bala"
- Rasheed Ali as Rasheed
- Ahmed Abdul Rehman as "Nazeer" Nazira
- Nayyab Faiza as Shadaan
- Khalid Hassan Rumi as Guddu

== Production ==
The principal photography of the serial took place in Lahore and ended in the first quarter of 2018.

== Awards and nominations ==
Year	Award	Category	Recipient(s)	Result	Ref.
2019	ARY Digital- Social Media Drama Awards 2018	Best Negative Actor (Female)	Mehar Bano	Nominated	
