= 19th Lux Style Awards =

Pakistani film awards ceremony

- Date: 30 December 2020
- Country: Pakistan
- Hosted by: Ahmed Ali Butt and Mehwish Hayat

Television/radio coverage
- Network: Geo Entertainment
- Directed by: Feriha Altaf

The 19th Lux Style Awards presented by Lux to honor the best in fashion, music, films and Pakistani television of 2019, held digitally on 31 December 2020. The awards were held virtually due to the outbreak of the COVID-19 pandemic in the world.

The ceremony was directed by Feriha Altaf. The ceremony was hosted by Ahmed Ali Butt and Mehwish Hayat. Ranjha Ranjha Kardi remained the most awarded television series while Laal Kabootar remained the most awarded film.

== Winners and nominees ==
The nominations were announced on 3 October 2020.

=== Films ===
Best Film	Best Film Director
Laal Kabootar; Baaji; Parey Hut Love; Ready Steady No; Superstar	Kamal Khan - Laal Kabootar; Asim Raza - Parey Hut Love; Mohammed Ehteshamuddin - Superstar; Hisham Bin Munawar - Ready Steady No; Saqib Malik - Baaji
Best Film Actor	Best Film Actress
Viewers' Choice: Ahmed Ali Akbar - Laal Kabootar; Critics' Choice: Rashid Farooqui - Laal Kabootar; Nadeem Baig - Superstar; Salman Shahid - Ready Steady No; Sheheryar Munawar - Parey Hut Love	Viewers' Choice: Mahira Khan - Superstar; Critics' Choice: Mahira Khan - Superstar; Mansha Pasha - Laal Kabootar; Maya Ali - Parey Hut Love; Amna Ilyas - Baaji; Meera - Baaji
Best Film Playback
Ali Tariq - 'Behka Na' from Parey Hut Love; Ali Sethi - ‘Bekaraan’ from Superstar; Jabbar Abbas - ‘Jugart’ from Laal Kabootar; Mai Dhai - ‘Raag Murli’ from Laal Kabootar; Zeb Bangash - ‘Gudi Wang’ for Baaji

=== Television ===
Best Television Play	Best Television Director
Meray Paas Tum Ho (ARY Digital); Aangan (Hum TV); Cheekh (ARY Digital); Ishq Zahe Naseeb (Hum TV); Ranjha Ranjha Kardi (Hum TV)	Kashif Nisar - Ranjha Ranjha Kardi (Hum TV) ); Kashif Nisar - Inkaar (Hum TV); Mohammed Ehteshamuddin - Aangan (Hum TV); Farooq Rind - Ishq Zahe Naseeb (Hum TV); Nadeem Baig - Meray Paas Tum Ho (ARY Digital)
Best Television Actor	Best Television Actress
Viewers' Choice: Imran Ashraf - Ranjha Ranjha Kardi (Hum TV); Critics' Choice: Zahid Ahmed - Ishq Zahe Naseeb (Hum TV); Humayun Saeed - Meray Paas Tum Ho (ARY Digital); Rehan Sheikh - Inkaar (Hum TV); Bilal Abbas Khan - Cheekh (ARY Digital )	Viewers' Choice: Yumna Zaidi - Inkaar (Hum TV); Critics' Choice: Iqra Aziz - Ranjha Ranjha Kardi (Hum TV); Saba Qamar - Cheekh (ARY Digital); Sajal Aly - Aangan (Hum TV); Ayeza Khan - Meray Paas Tum Ho (ARY Digital)
Best Television Writer	Best Emerging Talent in Television
Faiza Iftikhar - Ranjha Ranjha Kardi (Hum TV); Khalil-ur-Rehman Qamar - Meray Paas Tum Ho (ARY Digital); Sarwat Nazir - Khaas (Hum TV); Hashim Nadeem - Ishq Zahe Naseeb (Hum TV); Zafar Mairaj - Inkaar (Hum TV)	Shees Sajjad Gul - Meray Paas Tum Ho (ARY Digital); Saheefa Jabbar Khattak - Beti (ARY Digital); Haroon Shahid - Do Bol (ARY Digital); Naimal Khawar - Anaa (Hum TV); Usman Mukhtar - Anaa (Hum TV)
Best Television Track
Ranjha Ranjha Kardi by JB Sisters & Rahma Ali (Hum TV); Ishq Zahe Naseeb - Naveed Nashad (Hum TV); Kaisa Hai Naseeban - Zeb Bangash (ARY Digital); Ramz-e-Ishq - Shani Arshad (Geo TV); Khaas - Natasha Baig (Hum TV)

=== Criticism ===
Despite winning for Best Director, Best Actor, Best Actress, Best Writer and Best OST Ranjha Ranjha Kardi did not win Best TV Play because it was an audience voted category.

== Special ==
=== Life time achievement award ===
- Anwar Maqsood
- Tapu Javeri
