= Adhoora Bandhan =

2017 Pakistani TV series

- Genre: Family drama
- Written by: Human Hina Nafees
- Directed by: Shah Hussain
- Starring: Nauman Masood; Faria Sheikh; Erum Akhtar
- Country of origin: Pakistan
- Original language: Urdu
- No. of episodes: 42

Production
- Producer: Babar Javed
- Production location: Pakistan
- Running time: approx. 40 minutes

Original release
- Network: Geo Entertainment
- Release: 9 October 2017 – 3 March 2018

Adhoora Bandhan (transl. Incomplete Bond) is a 2017 Pakistani drama serial directed by Shah Hussain, produced by Babar Javed, and written by Huma Hina Nafees. The drama stars Nauman Masood, Faria Sheikh and Erum Akhtar. and was first aired on 9 October 2017 on Geo Entertainment. It aired every Friday and Saturday night at 7:00 pm.

== Cast ==
- Nauman Masood as Yasir
- Erum Akhtar as Rozina
- Farah Shah as Sarwat
- Madiha Rizvi as Atiya
- Sohail Sameer as Safdar Hussain
- Yasir Ali Khan as Daniyal
- Ramsha Khan as Komal
- Naeem Tahir as Col. Zahid
- Furqan Qureshi as Shahmeer
- Rashid Farooqui as Aijaz
- Farah Nadeem as Tabbassum
- Hafsa Butt as Natasha
