= Zara Yaad Kar =

2016 Pakistani television series

- Genre: Family drama Serial drama Romantic drama
- Written by: Khalil-ur-Rehman Qamar
- Directed by: Amna Nawaz Khan
- Starring: Zahid Ahmed; Yumna Zaidi; Sana Javed
- Opening theme: "Zara Yaad Kar Mere Humnafs"; Singer; Rahat Fateh Ali Khan; Lyrics by Khalil-ur-Rehman Qamar
- Composer: Sahir Ali Bagga
- Country of origin: Pakistan
- Original language: Urdu
- No. of episodes: 28

Production
- Executive producer: Sameer Shuja
- Producers: Amna Nawaz Khan; Muhammad Usman Abdul Sattar
- Running time: 35–40 minutes

Original release
- Network: Hum TV
- Release: 15 March – 20 September 2016

Zara Yaad Kar (Urdu: ذرا یاد کر, romanized: transl. Do just remember) is a 2016 Pakistani drama serial that aired on Hum TV from 15 March 2016 to 20 September 2016. It was directed and produced by Amna Nawaz Khan and written by Khalil-ur-Rehman Qamar. It starred Zahid Ahmed, Yumna Zaidi and Sana Javed. The plot revolves around a dedicated woman who is in love with a middle-class yet sincere man but he is married with a carefree carper.

It marked the second on-screen pairing of Yumna and Zahid after their appearance in Jugnoo (2015). Zaidi's performance was lauded by audiences and critics.

== Plot ==
The story revolves around Hadi and Mahnoor, who are first cousins and married (Nikkah). Hadi is a simple man, with a limited earning but he earnestly loves Mahnoor. He lives in a rented room in a house owned by Ikhtiar Ali. Ikhtiar and his college-going daughter Uzma both hold Hadi in high regard due to his impeccable character and calm demeanor. Hadi is immensely caring and protective towards Mahnoor, whom he treats as the center of his universe. He is also broad-minded and encourages Mahnoor to work and be self-sufficient. Uzma, who is unaware that Hadi is married, is drawn to him due to his likeable nature. She ends up writing a letter to Hadi confessing her crush on him. Hadi gently rebukes her, letting her know that he is married and deeply in love with Mahnoor. He shows the letter to Mahnoor thinking that he should not hide anything from his wife.

Mahnoor on the other hand is not as emotionally invested in the relationship as Hadi. Her selfish side emerges when she meets her new neighbour Waqar who teaches Urdu in a local college. Mahnoor finds Waqar wealthier and more attractive than Hadi. Her greed leads to her asking Hadi for divorce so that she can marry Waqar. Her selfish act creates a rift between her and her mother Aneesa (Saba Faisal) and leaves Hadi heart-broken. Although deeply hurt, Hadi agrees to divorce Mahnoor as he believes Mahnoor's feelings for Waqar to be genuine. He agrees to the divorce in order to preserve his own self-respect and also because he believes in letting go someone who doesn't love him.

Mahnoor asks Waqar to marry her on the same day that she gets divorce from Hadi, to which Waqar tacitly agrees. However, unbeknownst to Mahnoor, Waqar is an opportunist and has interest in women only for their wealth. He is hired to teach Urdu to Geeti (Shermeen Ali), who is the daughter of a renowned politician Deswali (Adnan Jilani). Geeti has recently returned from USA to contest upcoming elections from the town to which Waqar belongs. Waqar leaves for his hometown without informing Mahnoor, with his house help Umerdeen in his tow.

While learning Urdu from Waqar, Geeti starts to get attracted to him. He accompanies her on her campaign tours, which allows them to spend more and more time together, strengthening her feeling for him. Eventually, Geeti confesses her feelings to Waqar, who feels elated to have won the heart of a powerful politician's daughter. Aneesa, concerned about the future of her daughter, manages to find Waqar's whereabouts and hands them over to Mahnoor so that she can find out his plans. Mahnoor, ecstatic at finally having received Waqar's whereabouts, calls him. Waqar acts innocent about his sudden departure, hints at being in some sort of trouble and promises to meet Mahnoor after a couple of months after he has had the chance to settle the matters he is involved with.

Waqar's response makes Mahnoor suspicious and she seemingly grows repentant for her behaviour towards Hadi. She tries to apologize to Hadi without her mother's knowledge in order to move towards a possible reconciliation. However, Hadi does not forgive her immediately, still nursing his hurt self-respect. Mahnoor grows desperate and asks Hadi to remarry her, in blatant disregard of religious and social norms. Mahnoor's act leaves Hadi even more heart-broken because he sees Mahnoor taking marriage, commitment, love and relationships so lightly. He starts to wonder whether he is ready to suffer another heart-break by remarrying Mahnoor, despite still loving her to his core.

Waqar's soaring dreams come crashing down when Geeti's brother discovers his schemes. Waqar gets beaten up, is warned to stay away from Geeti, gets threatened to marry immediately and leave the city. Helpless against the might of Geeti's brother, Waqar leaves the city as advised. Feeling cheated by Waqar, Mahnoor decides to get back with Hadi at all costs. However, she can do so only by marrying another man, divorcing him and waiting for a mandatory period before remarrying Hadi. Jealous of Uzma who she fears may take Hadi away from her, she asks Hadi to leave Uzma's house and find another accommodation. Uzma too asks Hadi to leave after she is accused by Mahnoor of trying to win over Hadi.

A helpless Hadi leaves Uzma's house and takes up accommodation in another house, owned by (Fauzia Mushtaq). There he meets Anushay, her grand-daughter. Hadi learns that Anushay is the new girlfriend of Waqar and unaware of Waqar's past, she is looking forward to marry him. Hadi tries to stop her by sharing Waqar's past deeds with her and her grandmother; but stubborn by nature, Anushay isn't willing to give up on Waqar and ends up marrying him.

Geeti's brother gets arrested for a road accident and she learns that her father and brother have planted false evidence and witnesses to take the blame away from her brother. Disgusted, she decides to leave the country and go back to US but tracks down Waqar for one final meeting to thank him for introducing her to the world of deceit. This triggers a change of heart in Waqar who decides to lead a life of honesty and decency with Anushay. However, as fate would have it, Anushay gets murdered at their home and all evidence points towards Waqar, who gets sent to prison for his life.

Hadi comes across Umerdeen and convinces him to marry Mahnoor for one day so that he and Mahnoor can get married. Umerdeen agrees to this and a relieved Hadi breaks this news to Mahnoor. However, he ends up overhearing Mahnoor telling her mother that she is marrying Hadi only out of pity. She further goes on to say that she finds Hadi's company unbearable and that she would treat her impending marriage to him as a prison for life. A disgusted Hadi finally wakes up to Mahnoor's true nature and regrets his selfless devotion to her.

Mahnoor marries Umerdeen, thinking that he would divorce her the next day, only to find out to her shock that Umerdeen has no such intentions. He hands out a letter to her before taking her with him to his hometown. The letter has been written by Hadi who rebukes her for her selfishness and lack of respect for others. He also expresses his disappointment over Mahnoor's lack of acknowledgement for his love and care. He reveals his heartbreak to her after overhearing her conversation with her mother where she compared the prospects a life with Hadi to a lifelong prison sentence. He further writes that it was he who effected the change of plans with Umerdeen, even though he had to resort to deceit to do so, going against his nature and principles.

Uzma too is in for a shock as she discovers Hadi at her doorstep, finally acknowledging her love for him and asking her to marry him, to which she agrees.

== Cast ==
Characters	Portrayed By
Hadi	Zahid Ahmed
Mahnoor	Sana Javed
Uzma	Yumna Zaidi
Waqar	Yasir Mazhar
Aneesa Begum	Saba Faisal
Geti Deswali	Shermeen Ali
Ikhtiyar Ali	Rashid Farooqui
Anushay	Maryam Fatima
Mehtab Deswali (Geti's father)	Adnan Jilani
Aftab Deswali (Geti's brother)	Inshal Shah
Umer-Din (Waqar's domestic helper and servant)	Murad Jahanzaib
Hadi's new house's owner (Anushay's grandmother)	Fouzia Mushtaq
Farhan, Mahnoor's brother	Zeeshan Akbar

== Release ==
=== Home media and streaming service ===
The show was uploaded on Hum TV's official YouTube channel simultaneously with its airing on TV. Later in 2017, all the episodes were deleted and reuploaded in October 2019 with muted music. It is also available on Eros Now.

== Soundtrack ==
Zara Yaad Kar – OST

Soundtrack album by Rahat Fateh Ali Khan
- Released: 1 December 2016
- Recorded: 2016
- Genre: Television soundtrack
- Length: (4:34)
- Language: Urdu
- Label: Hum TV

Music video
- "Zara Yaad Kar " OST on YouTube

The title song was sung by Rahat Fateh Ali Khan. The music was composed by and the lyrics were written by Khalil-ur-Rehman Qamar.Zara Yaad Kar on SoundCloud

== See also ==
- 2016 in Pakistani television
- List of programs broadcast by Hum TV
