= The Castle: Aik Umeed =

- Title screen
- Genre: Drama
- Created by: Zulfiqar Sheikh
- Written by: Haseena Moin
- Directed by: Zulfiqar Sheikh
- Starring: Talat Hussain; Samina Ahmad; Shakeel; Shagufta Ejaz; Bilal Ahmad; Humayun Saeed; Asma Anwar; Nayyar Ejaz; Tasmina Sheikh; Rehan Sheikh; Alex Salmond
- Country of origin: Pakistan
- Original languages: Urdu; Scottish
- No. of seasons: 1
- No. of episodes: 24

Production
- Producer: Tasmina Sheikh
- Production location: Scotland
- Running time: 43 minutes
- Production company: Elysée Productions

Original release
- Network: Pakistan Television Corporation
- Release: 2001

The Castle: Aik Umeed is a 2001 Pakistani television drama series, the third series made by Elysée Productions. It was scripted by Haseena Moin, produced by Tasmina Sheikh, and directed by Zulfiqar Sheikh. It starred Talat Hussain, Samina Ahmad, Shakeel, Shagufta Ejaz, Bilal Ahmad, Humayun Saeed, Asma Anwar, Nayyar Ejaz, Tasmina Sheikh, and Rehan Sheikh. The Scottish politician Alex Salmond has a brief non-speaking cameo as a ghost at one point, and is listed in the credits for all 24 episodes.

== Synopsis ==
Aik Umeed is an Urdu phrase meaning "a hope". The story dealt with Pakistani immigrants to Scotland, and was shot on location in Scotland and Pakistan. Wedderburn Castle was the location of much of the Scottish action.

== Plot ==
The story begins with Fawad Ali Syed, a wealthy Pakistani lawyer who settled in England and lives in a grand castle in Scotland after marrying an English woman. Following the death of his wife, his only son Adeel becomes the center of his life. Although Adeel secretly marries an English woman without informing his father, Fawad eventually accepts the marriage and prepares to welcome the couple, but they are tragically killed in a car accident before they can visit him. Grief-stricken and left without an heir, Fawad invites his estranged relatives from Pakistan to the castle with the intention of distributing his vast estate. As they gather, each character brings personal ambitions, emotional burdens, and hopes of inheritance. Among them are Nayab, Fawad's former love, her mentally challenged son Fayz, her humorous brother Munawwar, Professor Yousuf and his artistic daughter Channel, as well as the young visitors Armani, Arsal, and Someet.

== Cast ==
- Talat Hussain as Fawad Ali Syed
- Samina Ahmad as Nayab
- Shakeel as Professor Yousuf
- Shagufta Ejaz as Jasmine
- Bilal Ahmad as Armani
- Humayun Saeed as Arsal
- Asma Anwar as Someet
- Nayyar Ejaz as Munawar
- Tasmina Sheikh as Channel
- Rehan Sheikh as Fayz
- Zulfiqar Sheikh as Adeel
- Alex Salmond

== Soundtrack ==
Waqar Ali and Uzma Shah performed the original soundtrack of the series.

== Production ==
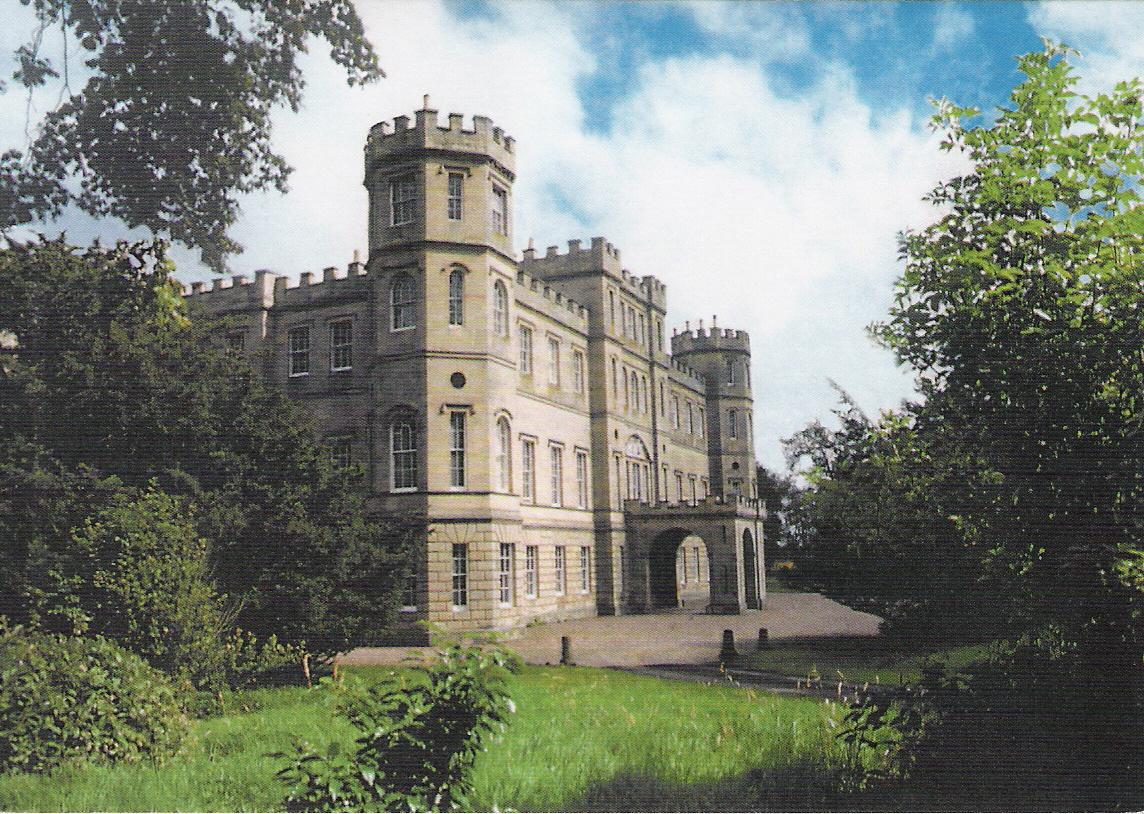
Wedderburn Castle, the major filming location

The series was set and filmed in Scotland's Wedderburn Castle. It was produced by Elysee Productions.

== Broadcast ==
The program was broadcast by Pakistan Television Corporation.
