= Akhri Barish =

Television series

- Title screen
- Genre: Drama
- Written by: Seema Ghazal
- Directed by: Adnan Wai Qureshi
- Starring: Arjumand Rahim; Angeline Malik; Samina Ahmad; Moammar Rana; Sajid Hasan; Mariya Khan; Rubina Ashraf
- Composer: Ali Raza
- Country of origin: Pakistan
- Original language: Urdu
- No. of episodes: 32

Production
- Producer: Mehroz Karim
- Editors: Syed Raheel Hashmi; Majid; Asad Ahmed
- Running time: 40-42 minutes

Original release
- Network: Hum TV
- Release: 3 April – 11 December 2011

Akhri Barish (Urdu: آخری بارش, lit. 'The last rain') is a Pakistani television series directed by Adnan Wai Qureshi. It aired from 3 April 2011 to 11 December 2011 on Hum TV. Previously, the drama went by the name Larki chaya; however, it was later changed to Akhri Barish, possibly to avoid people thinking it is a drama about prostitution.

The story revolves around the weaknesses in our social norms and behaviour. It highlights the dilemma of a woman who has left her past behind, but still faces hurdles in being accepted as a member of the society.

== Plot ==
The story begins with two sisters, Dil Aara and Husna, who are tawaifs and run a kotha. Husna's daughter, Zeenat Aman is good at dancing and singing, and earns money from her customers. However, Dil Aara's daughter, Chanda, has no interest in these things and wants to lead a respectable life. Her mother also wants to marry her off as soon as possible. One day, Dil Aara dies due to a heart attack, leaving Chanda in a helpless situation.

A police inspector visits the kotha, misbehaves with Chanda, and she insults him in return. The inspector then arrests all the tawaifs and agrees to release them only if Chanda spends a night with him. Husna reluctantly agrees to the proposal, and the inspector releases all the tawaifs.

Meanwhile, a young man named Shahram visits the kotha and falls in love with Chanda. They want to get married, but Shahram's parents need to approve of the decision. On the night the inspector planned to meet Chanda, Husna sends all the tawaifs to a function for a performance, leaving herself and Chanda alone at the kotha. The inspector arrives and tries to harm Chanda, but she bites his hand and thwarts his attempt.

On the other hand, Shahram's father, Mehmood, becomes furious upon learning of his son's decision to marry a tawaif and tries to restrain him from doing so. Eventually, Mehmood leaves for the UK with his wife, Kulsoom, and hands over his house to his cousin Saira, ensuring that Shahram cannot bring Chanda there after marriage.

== Cast ==
- Arjumand Rahim as Chanda
- Angeline Malik as Zeenat Aman
- Samina Ahmad as Husna
- Zaheen Tahira as Dil Aara
- Sajid Hasan as Laphra
- Rehan Sheikh as Vaatke
- Rubina Ashraf as Saira
- Maria Wasti
- Moammar Rana
- Mariya Khan as Champa
- Faisal Qureshi
- Mehwish Hayat
- Sami Khan
- Shakeel
- Adnan Jilani
- Mehak Ali
- Afshan Qureshi
- Maria Khan

== Production ==
Resham was also cast in the series in a prominent role but later she dropped it.

The principal photography for the series took place in Karachi.
