= Rehan Sheikh =

Pakistani actor

- Born: 13 January 1969 (age 57); London, England
- Education: University of Surrey
- Occupations: Actor; director; producer; theater artist; screenwriter
- Years active: 1992–present
- Notable work: The Castle-Aik Umeed, Akbari Asghari, Akhri Barish, Sanjha, Aik Nayee Cinderella

Rehan Sheikh (born 13 January 1969) is a Pakistani film and television actor, director, writer, film maker and producer. For his portrayal of Hafiz Ilyas in social drama Inkaar (2019), he received critical praise and a nomination for Best Actor at Lux Style Awards.

== Early life ==
Sheikh was born in London to veteran journalist Aslam Sheikh (d. 2003), who served as director-general of the Associated Press of Pakistan and was also "among the pioneers of economic journalism in Pakistan", whose older brother was a film director and screenwriter.

Sheikh's mother is a teacher and spent a lifetime in serving the education sector. He has two sisters, both Fulbright scholars.

== Career ==
=== In the United Kingdom ===
Sheikh started with a youth theater group in South London, having worked in Tamasha Theatre Company's Women of the Dust in 1992.

=== In Pakistan ===
While visiting Pakistan on holiday, he directed, wrote and acted in a theater performance in Rawalpindi, and after being spotted by Sarmad Sehbai he got his first TV role in PTV's Aaghosh in 1993, which eventually became a classic. He went on do a number of popular drama serials and also was the host of a popular travel show Travel Guide of Pakistan.

Some of his notable performances include Haseena Moin's PTV classic serial The Castle: Aik Umeed and the Hum TV play Sanjha, which earned him a nomination for best supporting actor at the 1st Hum Awards. His other major serials include Awazain, Bisat, Kiran Kahani, Dozukh, Maa, Nasal, and Mohlat.

Sheikh wrote, directed, acted and provided lyrics for some of the songs for the film Azad.

== Filmography ==
=== Films ===
Year	Title	Role	Director	Producer	Screenwriter	Note
2003	Khamosh Pani	Afshan				
2015	Manto	Mian Sahab				
2016	Actor in Law	Lawyer				
2017	Chupan Chupai					
2017	Driven	Inspector Murtaza Shah				
2018	Azad		Yes	Yes	Yes	
2024	Poppay Ki Wedding	Shah Sahab				

=== Television serials ===
Year	Title	Role	Channel	Note
1993	Aaghosh	Aizaz	PTV	Drama debut
1996–1997	The Bill	Mr. Khan / Shariff Shah	ITV	British series; appears in 2 episodes
1997	Dozakh		PTV	
1998	Mohlat		PTV	
1999	Aik Mohabat Sau Afsanay		PTV	Anthology series; appears in episode "Himmat-e-Batil"
2000	Bisaat		PTV / Indus TV	
2000	Sath Sath Ya Alag Alag		PTV	
2001	The Castle: Aik Umeed		PTV	
2006	Kiran Kahani	Dr. Salman	PTV	Remake of Haseena Moin's 1973 drama
2006	Pehchaan	Asad	Hum TV	Re-aired in 2011 under the title Aks
2008	The Ghost	Aryan	Hum TV	
2010	Woh Chaar		Hum TV	
2011	Akhri Barish		Hum TV	
2011	Akbari Asghari	Hatim Choudhry	Hum TV	
2011	Sanjha	Bakshu	Hum TV	
2012	Aik Nayee Cinderella	Saifullah	Hum TV	Cameo
2014	Laa	Naimat Khan	Hum TV	
2014	Sadqay Tumhare	Mohammad Amin Janjua	Hum TV	
2015	Jugnoo	Baba Saheb	Hum TV	
2015	Preet Na Kariyo Koi	Sulehri Sahab	Hum TV	
2016	Udaari	Majid	Hum TV	
2017	Sammi	Chaudhry Rab Nawaz	Hum TV	
2017	Qurban	Shafi Mohammad	Hum TV	
2018	Pukaar	Sultan Asfand	Hum TV	
2019	Inkaar	Hafiz Ilyas Sahab	Hum TV	
2019	Shahrukh Ki Saliyan	Havildar Maula Baksh	Geo Entertainment	
2020	Fat Family	Murad	S TV	
2020	Mehar Posh	Jahanzaib	Geo Entertainment	
2021	Berukhi	Mansoor Ahmad	ARY Digital	
2022	Meray Humnasheen	Saif Khan	Geo Entertainment	
2023	Chand Tara	Gulzar "Babu Bhaiyya"	Hum TV	
2024	Zard Patton Ka Bunn	Malik Nadir Khan	Hum TV	
2025	Paradise	Nawab Humayun Ali Khan	Express Entertainment	

== Awards and nominations ==
Year	Ceremony	Category	Project	Result	Note
2005	Kara Film Festival	Best Actor	24 Hours	Won	
2013	1st Hum Awards	Best Supporting Actor	Sanjha	Nominated	
2015	3rd Hum Awards	Best Supporting Actor	Sadqay Tumhare	Won	
2020	19th Lux Style Awards	Best Television Actor	Inkaar	Nominated	
