= Aamir Yousuf =

Pakistani TV director

Aamir Yousaf
- Occupations: Television Director, Producer
- Years active: 2008–present

Aamir Yousaf is a Pakistani TV director, producer, writer and former actor. Yousaf has directed drama serials such as Virasat, Ghaao, Anokha Ladla and Aap ki Kaneez, for which he was nominated for Best TV Director at the 15th Lux Style Awards .

== Filmography ==
=== Television ===
- Zindaan (director/producer) (PTV)
- Anokha Ladla ( PTV)
- Main Mar Gai Shaukat Ali (A-Plus TV)
- Mei Muhabat Aur Tum (A-Plus TV)
- Ghao (GEO)
- Virasat (GEO)
- Aas (GEO)
- Aap Ki Kaneez (GEO)
- Paras (GEO)
- Bas Vey Rabba (director/producer) ( PTV)
- Atiraz (ARY)
- Jaan Nisaar (A-Plus TV)
- Is Chand Pe Dagh Nahin (A-Plus TV)
- Ishq Mein Kaafir (A-Plus TV)
- Janbaaz (Express Entertainment)

=== Telefilms ===
- Capt. Bilal Shaheed (ISPR)
- Ehd-e-Wafa (ISPR)
- Dosti (ISPR)

== Accolades ==
Year	Project	Award	Result
2011	Anokha Ladla	Lux Style Award for Best TV Director	Nominated
2016	Aap ki Kaneez	Lux Style Award for Best TV Director	Nominated
