= Guzaarish (TV series) =

2015 Pakistani television series

- Genre: Romance; Drama
- Written by: Sanam Mehdi
- Directed by: Owais Khan
- Starring: Yumna Zaidi; Affan Waheed; Ahmed Ali
- Theme music composer: Sahir Ali Bagga
- Country of origin: Pakistan
- Original language: Urdu
- No. of episodes: 25

Production
- Producers: Humayun Saeed; Shahzad Nasib
- Production location: Karachi
- Production company: Six Sigma PLus

Original release
- Network: ARY Digital
- Release: 2015

Guzaarish (Urdu: گزارش transl. A request) is a Pakistani television series that aired on ARY Digital in 2015. It was produced by Humayun Saeed and Shahzad Nasib under Six Sigma Plus and written by Sanam Mehdi Jarchevi. Yumna Zaidi, Ahmed Ali and Affan Waheed play the roles of Zara, Zain and Saad respectively.

== Plot ==
The series explores the story of Zain and Zara, who are in love. They are engaged to be married. What follows is an evil mother-in-law who is all out to ensure her son turns against the daughter-in-Law (Zara) and has her thrown out of the house.

== Cast ==
- Yumna Zaidi as Zara
- Affan Waheed as Saad
- Ahmed Ali Akbar as Zain
- Javed Sheikh as Aalam
- Saba Hamid as Batool (Phupo)
- Alyy Khan as Jaffar
- Saba Faisal as Zain's mother
- Maha Warsi as Hina
- Sara Ashraf as Sara
- Arjumand Hussain as Siddiqui
- Seemi Pasha as Hina's mother
- Jahanzeb Khan as Khurram
- Farah Nadeem as Sara's mother-in-law
