= Saman Ansari =

Pakistani television actress

- Born: Saman Ansari; Karachi, Sindh, Pakistan
- Occupations: Television; Film; Theater actress Voice over; artist
- Years active: 2014-present
- Spouse: Saif Ahmed
- Relatives: Ishrat Ansari (Father)

Saman Ansari is a Pakistani television and theatre actress. She made her television debut in 2014 and since then, has played supporting roles in many television serials besides a few leading roles. Her accolades include four Hum Awards and a Pakistan International Screen Award nomination.

== Career ==
Saman Ansari started her career in the HUM TV drama Jugnoo opposite Zahid Ahmed and Yumna Zaidi. She is noted for playing the parallel lead in Karb alongside Armeena Rana Khan and Adnan Siddiqui. Her role as the supporting lead opposite Ahsan Khan and Hira Mani in Preet Na Kariyo Koi received critical acclaim. Karb went on air in the Spring of 2015 and Preet Na Kariyo Koi went on air in late 2015 and finished in early 2016 on Hum TV. Ansari did her first negative role in a soap called Mera Dard Na Janay Koi. She has made guest appearances in two episodes of Hum TV's comedy series Mr. Shamim and played the lead role in Geo Entertainment's serial Saas Bahu. In Meri Har Nazar Teri Muntazir, which began on 10 February 2016, she plays the lead role of a doctor slammed by the tempest of life. Playing a manipulative friend who is a professional lawyer, Ansari also appeared in Hum TV's serial Lagaao, in which she is a parallel lead (antagonist) opposite Adnan Jaffar. She received accolades for her powerful role in Dumpukht-Aatish e Ishq opposite Noman Ejaz which aired on A-Plus TV. Sammi, a drama serial about women's rights Aired on Hum TV where Ansari's performance as a mother of 5 girls with many failed pregnancies in the social pressure to have a son was admired globally by Hum TV viewers. She was nominated in two categories for her performance in Sammi at the HUMTV awards in 2018 for 'Best Female Actor in a Supporting Role' and 'Best on screen Couple.

Her most popular performances include Geo Entertainment's Khaani, where she plays the powerful role of Sitara Mir Shah. Dar Si Jaati hay Sila brought forth her spine chilling performance of Sadia awoman sexually abused by a male in-house relative and her constant efforts to protect her daughter from suffering the same way. This was a joint venture of Kashif Nisar and HUMTV.

OTT performances include her leading Lady performance in Jasoosi Duniya an adaptation of the world famous theater play the psychic. The play was mentored by Mr. Zia Mohouddin and directed by Mr. Khalid Ahmed at NAPA in 2018.

== Filmography ==
=== Television ===
Year	Title	Role	Notes	Ref.
2015	Karb	Aaliya Hamza		
2015	Jugnoo	Ayesha		
2015	Mr. Shamim	Muzammil's teacher	Guest appearance	
2015-16	Saas Bahu	Sabeen		
2015-16	Mera Dard Na Janay Koi	Sarwat Randhawa		
2015-16	Preet Na Kariyo Koi	Zarina		
2016	Lagaao	Sitwat Murtaza	Episode 15	
2016	Kahan Tum Chalay Gye	Addan		
2016	Khwab Saraye	Bilquis Waqar		
2016	Dumpukht - Aatish-e-Ishq	Bibi Noor Bano "Bibi Sahiba"		
2016	Bin Roye	Hira	Guest appearance	
2017	Gila	Shaista		
2017	Mujhay Thaam Lay	Almas		
2017	Sammi	Salima		
2017	Mohabbat Tumse Nafrat Hai	Mehrunnisa		
2017	Ghairat	Shagufta Usman		
2017–2018	Khaani	Sitara Shah		
2017–2018	Dar Si Jaati Hai Sila	Sadia		
2018	Ustani Jee	Zubia	Episode 2	
2018	Ab Dekh Khuda Kya Karta Hai			
2018	Ghamand	Zamarud		
2018	Romeo Weds Heer	Dr. Shahnaz Raja		
2018	Kabhi Band Kabhi Baja		Episode 21	
2018	Hoor Pari	Fehmida		
2019	Dil Kiya Karay			
2019	Choti Choti Batain	Shehnaz	Story 3: "Dil Hi Tou Hai"	
2020	Mera Maan Rakhna	Fozia		
2022	Badshah Begum	Hakim Bi		
2022	Dushman	Mai Laali		
2023	Fairy Tale	Nighat "Niggo"		
2023	Fairy Tale 2	Nighat "Niggo"		

=== Telefilm ===
Year	Title	Role	Notes	Ref.
2019	Pinky Ka Dulha		Eid Special	

== Accolades ==
Year	Awards	Category	Work	Result	Ref(s).
2016	Hum Awards	Best Supporting Actress	Jugnoo	Nominated	
2018	Hum Awards	Best Onscreen Couple - Popular (Note: shared with Adnan Siddiqui)	Sammi	Nominated	
2018	Hum Awards	Best Supporting Actress	Sammi	Nominated	
2019	Hum Awards	Best Supporting Actress	Dar Si Jaati Hai Sila	Nominated	
2020	Pakistan International Screen Awards	Best Television Actress in Comedy Role	Romeo Weds Heer	Nominated	
