= Ismat Zaidi =

Pakistani actress

- عصمت زیدی
- Born: Ismat Zaidi; Lahore, Pakistan
- Occupations: Actress; Theatre actress
- Years active: 1995 – present
- Children: 2

Ismat Zaidi is a Pakistani television and stage actress who has appeared in a variety of plays. She mostly plays motherly roles on television.

== Career ==
Her character of an elderly lady worried about the marital lives of her younger sister and niece in Farooq Rind's Jugnoo earned her a nomination in the Hum Award for Best Supporting Actress category. From 2020 to 2021, she portrayed the role of a responsible grandmother in Deewangi who keeps an eye on her children. She further appeared in Mehar Posh in 2020, and Fitoor in 2021.

== Filmography ==
=== Television ===
Year	Title	Role	Network	Ref.
1995	Janay Anjanay	Mehmoona	PTV	
2003	Umrao Jaan Ada		Geo TV	
2005	Riyasat	Captain Sheraz's mother	ARY TV	
2008	Chaudhween Ka Chand	Rija's mother	Hum TV	
2008	Doraha	Sarah's mother	Geo TV	
2010	Jannat Say Nikali Hui Aurat		Geo TV	
	Chayn Aye Na		Geo TV	
2008	Chaar Chand		Geo TV	
2007	Man-o-Salwa	Zainab's mother	Hum TV	
2009	Meri Unsuni Kahani		Hum TV	
2010	Malaal	Jawad's mother	Hum TV	
2010	Diya Jalay	Nadia's mother	ARY Digital	
2010	Meri Zaat Zarra-e-Benishan	Safia	Geo TV	
2010	Dolly Ki Ayegi Baraat	Nabeel's mother	Geo TV	
2011	Qaid-e-Tanhai	Aisha's mother	Hum TV	
2011	Parsa	Safia	Hum TV	
2011	Maaye Ni		ARY Digital	
2011	Kash Main Teri Beti Na Hoti	Shagufta	Geo TV	
2011	Neeyat	Sikandar's mother	ARY Digital	
2011	Umm-e-Kulsoom	Maryam	ARY Digital	
2012	Saat Pardon Mein	Badar's mother	Geo TV	
2012	Kitni Girhain Baqi Hain		Hum TV	
2012	Mujhay Roothnay Na Daina		Hum TV	
2013	Dil-e-Muztar	Adeel's mother	Hum TV	
2013	Kankar	Aisha	Hum TV	
2013	Teri Berukhi		Geo TV	
2013	Teray Pyar kay Bharosay		Express Entertainment	
2013-14	Mere Hamrahi	Zubeida	ARY Digital	
2013	Daag-e-Nadamat	Misbah Khalid	PTV	
2013	Meri Beti	Faisal's mother	ARY Digital	
2014	Meri Zindagi Hai Tu		Geo TV	
2014	Mere Meherbaan	Nayyara Baseer	Hum TV	
2014	Arranged Marriage		ARY Digital	
2014	Koi Nahi Apna		ARY Digital	
2014-15	Bikhra Mera Naseeb		Geo TV	
2015	Sartaj Mera Tu Raaj Mera		Hum TV	
2015	Guriya Rani		ARY Digital	
2015	Mein Bushra		ARY Digital	
2015	Jugnoo	Aapa Jahangir	Hum TV	
2015	Zid		Hum TV	
2015	Mol	Shehreyar's mother	Hum TV	
2015	Zinda Dargor	Waheeda	ARY Digital	
2015	Bheegi Palkein		A Plus Entertainment	
2015-16	Tere Baghair	Karamat	Hum TV	
2016	Mann Mayal	Durdana	Hum TV	
2016	Bay Aib	Shahana	Urdu 1	
2016	Kuch Na Kaho	Zainab	Hum TV	
2017	Sila	Razia	Hum TV	
2017	Kitni Girhain Baaki Hain: Part 2	Shakira/ Laila's mother	Hum TV	
2017	Baaghi	Chaudhrani Ji	Urdu 1	
2017	Yaqeen Ka Safar	Zubia's grandmother	Hum TV	
2018	Belapur Ki Dayan	Salima	Hum TV	
2018	Visaal	Jumman Bua	ARY Digital	
2018	Khalish	Tehmina	Geo TV	
2018	Balaa	Saba's mother	ARY Digital	
2018	Meri Guriya	Safeena's mother	ARY Digital	
2018-19	Beti	Maryam's mother	ARY Digital	
2019	Chand Ki Pariyan		ARY Digital	
2019	Jaal	Sakina Jameel	Hum TV	
2019	Ishq Zahe Naseeb	Sabiha Begum	Hum TV	
2019-20	Damsa	Abru	ARY Digital	
2019-20	Deewangi	Bi Jaan	Geo TV	
2020	Mehar Posh	Sakeena	Geo TV	
2021	Fitoor	Bushra	Geo TV	
2021	Tanaa Banaa	Qamar-un-Nisa	Hum TV	
2021	Parizaad	Naheed's mother	Hum TV	
2021-22	Bebasi	Ifrah's grandmother	Hum TV	
2021-22	Bebaak	Mesum's mother	Hum TV	
2022	Mushkil	Saghira	Geo TV	
2022-23	Agar	Shahwaiz's mother	Hum TV	
2023	Ehraam-e-Junoon	Kulsoom	Geo TV	
2023	Neem	Ashhad's mother	Hum TV	
2023	Jannat Se Aagay	Noman’s mother	Geo TV	
2023	Dhoka	Hadi's mother	ARY Digital	
2024	Khumar	Mudassir’s mother	Geo TV	
2024	Shiddat	Sarwat Jahan	Geo TV	
2024	Radd	Bano Aapa	ARY Digital	
2024	Aakhri Baar	Adnan’s mother	Express Entertainment	
2024	Yahya	Daadi	Geo Entertainment	
2024-25	Qarz-e-Jaan	Sabreena	Hum TV	
2025	Dayan	Mehrunnisa	Geo Entertainment	
2025	Ishq Di Chashni	Ehsan's mother	Green Entertainment	
2025	Dil Dhoondta Hai Phir Wohi	Murtaza's mother	Express Entertainment	
2026	Rehmat	Parishay’s grandmother	ARY Digital	
2026	Mirza Ki Heer	Mirza and Heer’s grandmother	ARY Digital	

== Awards and nominations ==
Year	Awards	Category	Work	Result	Ref.
2016	Hum Awards	Best Supporting Actress	Jugnoo	Nominated	
