= Masood Akhtar =

Masood Akhtar may refer to:

- Masood Akhtar (actor)
- Masood Akhtar (cricketer)
- Masood Akhtar (politician)
