= Sami Khan =

Pakistani actor and model

- سمیع خان
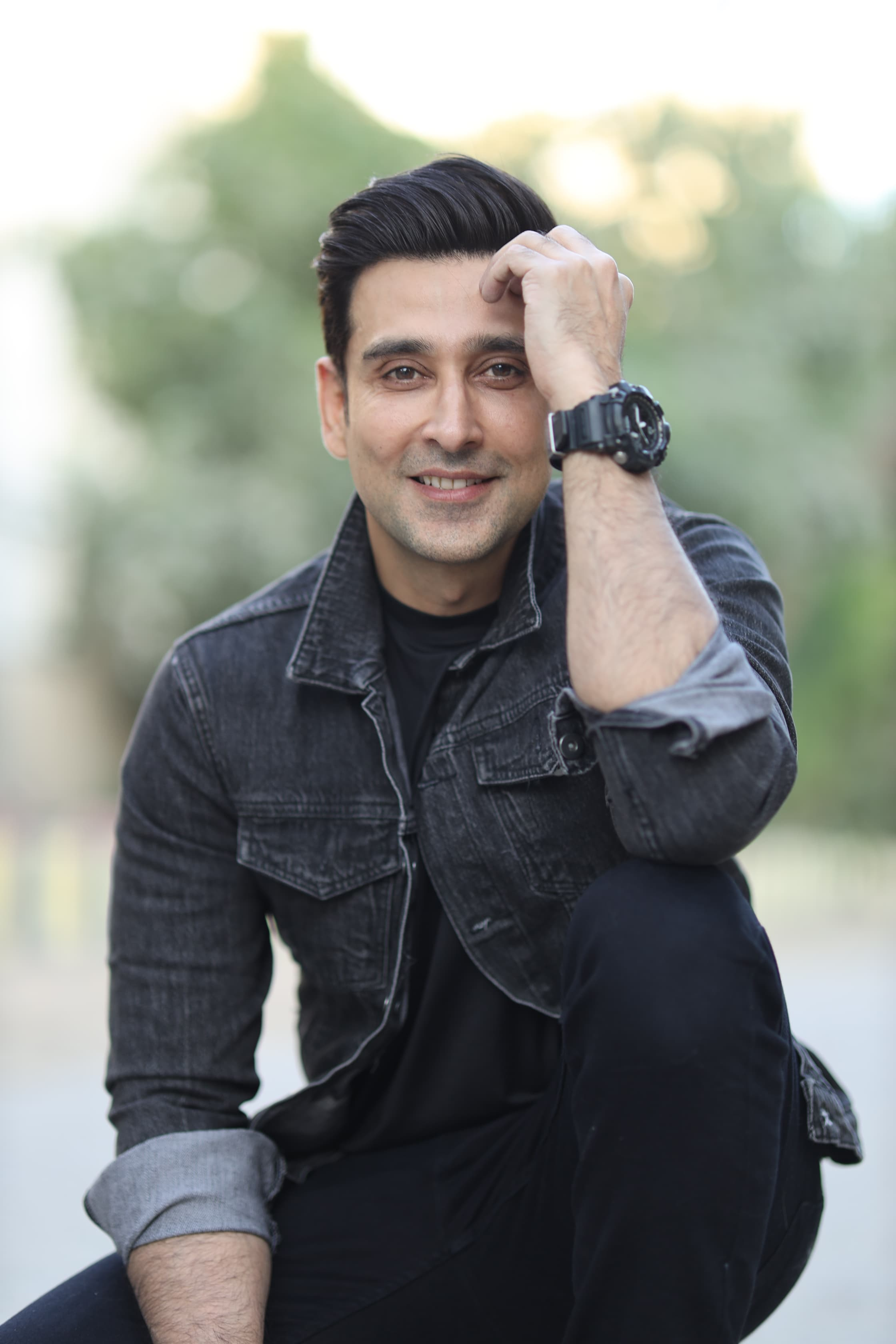
- Sami Khan
- Born: Mansoor Aslam Khan Niazi; 6 July 1980 (age 46); Lahore, Punjab, Pakistan
- Education: UET Lahore
- Occupation: Actor
- Years active: 2004–present
- Height: 6 ft 0 in (183 cm)
- Spouse: Shanzay Khan (m. 2009)
- Children: 2

Sami Khan (Urdu: سمیع خان; born Mansoor Aslam Khan Niazi (Urdu: منصوراسلم خان نیازی ) on 6 July 1980) is a Pakistani film and television actor and model, known for his versatile performances across both mediums.

He began his career in cinema with the film Salakhain (2004) before transitioning to television, where he rose to prominence through acclaimed roles in popular drama serials. Over a career spanning more than two decades, Khan has received multiple accolades, including Best Actor honors at the PTV Awards. He is also a recipient of the Tamgha-e-Imtiaz, one of Pakistan’s highest civilian honors, and earned critical acclaim for his performance in the movie Gumm (2019), for which he received several award nominations and wins. His film credits include the commercially successful Wrong No. 2 (2019), and his television work spans a wide range of genres, establishing him as one of Pakistan’s respected leading actors.

== Early life and education ==
Sami Khan was born on 6 July 1980 into a Pashtun (Niazi) family in Lahore, Punjab. His brother Taifoor Khan is an actor and musician. He received his early education at the Divisional Public School in Lahore. He completed his intermediate education (FSc Pre-Engineering) at Government College University, Lahore, one of Pakistan’s oldest and most prestigious institutions. Its alumni, traditionally known as “Ravians,” are recognized for the university’s longstanding academic and cultural legacy.

Khan then pursued higher education at the University of Engineering and Technology (UET), Lahore and graduated as an Electronic and Communication Engineer in 2003. Although trained as an engineer, he did not enter the profession, choosing instead to pursue opportunities in the entertainment industry after securing a role in a feature film before graduation.

== Career ==
Khan began his acting career in the early 2000s and made his Lollywood debut in 2004 with the film Salakhain, portraying a young police officer. He subsequently transitioned to television with Dil se Dil Tak on PTV and steadily built a career spanning more than two decades across both television and film. In 2011, he won the Best Actor award at the 16th PTV Awards for his performance in Ghar Ki Khatir.

Throughout the 2010s and 2020s, Khan starred in a range of serials, including Love Life, Aur Lahore, Main Chaand Si, Jo Chale To Jaan Se Guzar Gaye, Khudgarz, Do Qadam Door Thay, Aisi Hai Tanhai, Inkaar, Saraab, Tinkay Ka Sahara, and Duniyapur.

Alongside his television work, Khan continued to appear in films. In 2019, he starred opposite Neelam Muneer in the romantic-comedy film Wrong No. 2, which was a major commercial success and ranked as the third highest-grossing Pakistani film of 2019. He also starred in the mystery-thriller Gumm, which received critical acclaim, with Khan earning two Best Actor awards for his performance (Creation International Film Festival Canada and Madrid International Film Festival). Khan has also starred in the American/Pakistani film The Window, marking his involvement in an international production.

Over the course of his career, Khan has maintained a steady presence in mainstream productions, contributing to both critical acclaim and commercial success.

In August 2026, Khan was part of the official jury panel at the Los Angeles Tribune International Film Festival, held in Culver City, California. Khan served alongside filmmakers and industry professionals to evaluate emerging filmmaking talent.

== Filmography ==
Key
†	Denotes film / drama that has not released yet

=== Films ===
Year	Title	Role	Notes	Ref.
2004	Salakhain	Police officer Mansoor	Debut film; supporting role	
2004	Rabba Ishq Na Hovay	Raja	Debut as leading role	
2008	Anjaam			
2013	Devar Bhabhi	Khalid	Won Best Actor Award	
2013	Dil Paraye Des Mein	Hamza	Action drama	
2019	Gumm: In The Middle Of Nowhere	Asad	Won Best Actor Awards	
2019	Wrong No. 2	Omar	Comedy	
2019	Kaaf Kangana	Ali Mustafa		
2022	Lafangey	Ali	Horror-comedy	
2022	Yaara Vey	Sameer	Dubai produced Hindi-Urdu film	
2024	The Window	Babar	English film	

=== Television serials ===
Year	Title	Role	Network	Ref
2005	Dil se Dil Tak	Abdul	PTV	
2005	Chaap	Khizar	PTV	
2006	Tere Pehlu Mein	Ashar	Geo Entertainment	
2007	Partition Aik Safar	Salman	Geo Entertainment	
2008	Yaad Piya Ki Aye	Shehryar	PTV	
2008	Kinara	Munnawer	Geo TV	
2008	Sherdil	Fawaz	ARY Digital	
2008	Dil Dard Dhuan	Sherdil	ARY Digital	
2009	Haroon To Piya Teri	Yasir	TV One	
2009	Kabhi Na Houn Hum Juda	Yasir	ARY Digital	
2009	Jinnah Ke Naam	Ali	PTV	
2009	Kaghaz Kay Phool	Sheheryar	PTV	
2009	Mehmaan	Gulrez Khan	ARY Digital	
2009	Bol Meri Machli	Zubair	Geo Entertainment	
2009	Khan Sahib	Shahryar	Indus Vision	
2009	Saij	Kamran	Geo TV	
2010	Love, Life Aur Lahore	Pari Paker	A-Plus	
2010	Moum	Shoaib	PTV	
2010	Ghar Ki Khatir	Basham	PTV	
2010	Yeh Dil Hi To Hai	Farhan	ATV (Pakistan)	
2010	Anokha Bandhan	Ali	ATV (Pakistan)	
2010	Jeevan Ki Raahon Main	Khayyam	Geo TV	
2010	Bas Ik Tera Intezar	Babu Miyan	PTV	
2011	Maaye Ni	Hasham	ARY Digital	
2011	Main Chand Si	Salar	ARY Digital	
2011	Jo Chale To Jaan Se Guzar Gaye	Aazar	Geo Entertainment	
2011	Parwaz	Moeez	A-Plus	
2011	Kaala Jadoo	Yousuf	ARY Digital	
2011	Tootay Huway Per	Zaeem	Geo Entertainment	
2011	Jab Naam Pukare Jaenge	Shakirullah	Aaj TV	
2011	Akhri Barish	Whisky	Hum TV	
2011	Amber	Faizan		
2012	Teri Raah Main Rul Gai	Malik Jahandad	Urdu 1	
2012	Daray Daray Naina	Razim	A-Plus	
2012	Khushi Ek Roag	Ayan	ARY Digital	
2012	Meri Ladli	Abdul Hadi	ARY Digital	
2012	Sabz Pari Laal Kabootar	Shafiq	Geo TV	
2012	Sirat-e-Mustaqeem	Mustaqeem	Express Entertainment	
2012	Main	Dara	PTV	
2012	Topi Drama	Ammar	ARY Digital	
2012	Shadi Mubarak	Faraz	ARY Digital	
2012	My Dear Sotan	Mehrban	ARY Digital	
2012	Anoshka	Abdul Mateen "Martin"	PTV	
2013	Umm-e-Kulsoom	Moosa	ARY Digital	
2013	Ghaao	Mohid	Geo Entertainment	
2013	Meri Dulari	Yawar	Geo Entertainment	
2013	Mere Harjai	Moeed	ARY Digital	
2013	Main Gunehgar Nahi	Faizan	ARY Digital	
2013	Zindagi Dhoop Tum Ghana Saya	Naveed	ARY Digital	
2013	Barf		A-Plus	
2013	Dil Muhallay Ki Haveli	Saad	Geo Entertainment	
2013	Ek Thi Paro	Amir	TV One	
2013	Miss Fire	Sherry	Geo Entertainment	
2014	Do Qadam Door Thay	Zohab-ud-Din	Geo Entertainment	
2014	Bashar Momin	Buland Bakhtiyar	Geo Entertainment	
2014	Bikhra Mera Naseeb	Haris	Geo Entertainment	
2014	Sultanat-e-Dil	Wajdaan Shah	Geo Entertainment	
2014	Deemak	Armaghan	Geo Entertainment	
2015	Piya Mann Bhaye	Shaheer Sikandar	Geo Entertainment	
2015	Kaanch Ki Guriya	Daim	Geo Entertainment	
2015	Anaya Tumhari Hui	Sarim	Geo Entertainment	
2015	Ishqaaway	Haim	Geo Entertainment	
2015	Paras	Shahryar	Geo Entertainment	
2015	Teri Meri Jodi	Kabeer	Geo Entertainment	
2016	Mannchali	Monis	Geo Entertainment	
2016	Dhaani	Sameer	Geo Entertainment	
2016	Mera Dard Bayzuba	Faris	Geo Entertainment	
2016	Mannat	Dil Nawaz	Geo Entertainment	
2017	Tere Bina	Umair	Geo Entertainment	
2017	Be Inteha	Shahryar (Sherry)	Urdu 1	
2017	Rasm E Duniya	Harib	ARY Digital	
2017	Mushrik	Ali	A Plus Entertainment	
2017	Toh Dil Ka Kia Hua	Faris	Hum TV	
2017	Aisi Hai Tanhai	Hamza	ARY Digital	
2017	Khudgarz	Hasan	ARY Digital	
2018	Woh Mera Dil Tha	Zaid	ARY Digital	
2019	Inkaar	Shayaan	Hum TV	
2019	Ishq Zahe Naseeb	Kashif	Hum TV	
2020	Saraab	Asfandyar	Hum TV	
2020	Dulhan	Mikaal	Hum TV	
2021	Phaans	Samad	Hum TV	
2021	Dikhawa (Season 2): Bilal Ki Dadi	Inaam	Geo Entertainment	
2021	Dikhawa (Season 2): Shart	Khawar	Geo Entertainment	
2021	Mohlat	Dawar	Geo Entertainment	
2021	Mohabbat Daagh Ki Surat	Sanaan	Geo Entertainment	
2021	Mein Hari Piya	Fawad	ARY Digital	
2022	Dil Zaar Zaar	Shobi	Geo Entertainment	
2022	Pyar Deewangi Hai	Dawood	ARY Digital	
2022	Taqdeer	Asad	ARY Digital	
2022	Tinkay Ka Sahara	Wasay	Hum TV	
2023	Pyar Ke Naghmay: Rajjo Banegi Dulhan	Shahid Ali	TV One	
2023	Pyar Ke Naghmay: Gajra	Jamshed	TV One	
2023	Mujhay Qabool Nahi	Salman	Geo Entertainment	
2023	Kalank	Daniyal	Geo Entertainment	
2023	Muhabbat Ki Aakhri Kahani	Malik Farooq	Express Entertainment	
2023	Siyaah Series: Karsaz	Kamal Aziz Khan	Green Entertainment	
2023	Mein Kahani Hun: Tum Bin	Samir	Express Entertainment	
2023	Siyaah Series: Laawaris	Agha	Green Entertainment	
2023	Grey	Salaar Khan	Green Entertainment	
2023	Dooriyan	Haroon	Hum TV	
2024	Pagal Khana	Salman Dawar	Green Entertainment	
2024	Nasihat Series: Qasoorwar	Hayaat	Green Entertainment	
2024	Raaz Series: Mohabbat Khuda Hafiz	Saad	Green Entertainment	
2024	Aik Chubhan Si	Haroon	Hum TV	
2024	Duniyapur	Mir Hassan	Green Entertainment	
2024	Faraar	Mohsin Baig	Green Entertainment	
2025	Shikwa	Zaroon	ARY Digital	
2025	Arsh	Arsal	Express Entertainment	
2025	Naqsh	Meer Humayun	Green Entertainment	
2026	Sara Aapi	Burhan	Geo Entertainment	
2026	Ay Dushman-e-Jaan	Walid	Express Entertainment	

== Awards and nominations ==
Year	Film/Serial	Award	Category	Result
2010	Jinnah Ke Naam	PTV Award	Best Actor	Nominated
2011	Ghar Ki Khatir	PTV Award	Best Actor Jury’s Choice	Won
2011	Ghar Ki Khatir	PTV Award	Best Actor Viewer's Choice	Won
2012	N/A	Tamgha-e-Imtiaz	Performing Arts Category	Won
2013	Devar Bhabi	Tarang Housefull Awards	Best Actor	Won
2013	Main	Lux Style Awards	Best TV Actor (Terrestrial)	Nominated
2018	Aisi Hai Tanhai	IPPA Awards	Best TV Actor	Nominated
2018	Gumm	Creation International Film Festival Canada	Best Actor Feature Film	Won
2018	Gumm	Madrid International Film Festival	Best Actor Foreign Language Film	Won
2018	Aisi Hai Tanhai	ARY Digital- Social Media Drama Awards	Best Actor	Nominated
2018	Aisi Hai Tanhai	ARY Digital- Social Media Drama Awards	Best Couple (with Sonya Hussyn)	Nominated
2019	Khudgarz	Lux Style Awards	Best TV Actor	Nominated
2021	Saraab	Pakistan International Screen Awards	Best TV Actor Jury	Nominated
2024	Tinkay Ka Sahara	Hum Awards	Best Actor	Nominated
