= Jugnoo =

2015 Pakistani romantic drama serial

- Genre: Family drama Romance
- Written by: Amna Mufti
- Directed by: Farooq Rind
- Starring: Yumna Zaidi; Zahid Ahmed; Rehan Sheikh; Ismat Zaidi
- Opening theme: by Sahir Ali Bagga
- Composer: Sahir Ali Bagga
- Country of origin: Pakistan
- Original language: Urdu
- No. of episodes: 18

Production
- Producer: Momina Duraid
- Running time: 30–45 minutes
- Production company: MD Productions

Original release
- Network: Hum TV
- Release: 17 April – 14 August 2015

Jugnoo (Urdu: جگنو, lit. 'Firefly') is a 2015 Pakistani romantic drama serial. It is based on the novel Shehzori by Mirza Azeem Baig Chughtai, with screenplay by Amna Mufti. The series is directed by Farooq Rind and produced by Momina Duraid. It stars Yumna Zaidi and Zahid Ahmed in lead roles. It was originally aired on Hum TV on Fridays at 8:00 pm, from 17 April 2015 succeeding Sadqay Tumhare in its timeslot.

== Synopsis ==
The series narrates the story of a young and fun-loving girl, Jugnoo, who lost her father in childhood. She and her mother, Shah Jahan, live with her maternal aunt Jahangir. Despite facing troubles and hardships in her life, Jugnoo maintains a confident and jolly nature.

She comes across Ammu, a minor assistant in a production house. He deceives her into marrying him and falsely makes her believe that he is the one who runs the entire production house. However, after the marriage, the truth is revealed to Jugnoo. But by then, it's too late. Disheartened by his poverty, Ammu pressures her into modeling. Helpless Jugnoo agrees to model, thinking that this might be the end of her troubles. However, many more trials were yet to come.

One day, while shooting, Jugnoo meets Zulfi, a wealthy and charming yet coward boy. Zulfi weaves a web of lies to deceive Jugnoo and convinces her to divorce her husband.

== Cast ==
- Yumna Zaidi as Jugnoo
- Zahid Ahmed as Zulfi
- Rehan Sheikh as Baba Sahab
- Ismat Zaidi as Aapa Jahangir
- Laila Zuberi as Ghazala's Mother
- Saad Azhar as Tanveer
- Mehreen Raheel as Ghazala
- Saman Ansari as Ayesha
- Faheem Azam as Doctor Sadi
- Humaira Bano as Shah Jahan
- Malik Raza as Bakshi Jee
- Aqeel Abbas as Imran (Ammu)

== Reception ==
The drama was widely lauded due to its comic touch and glimpse. It was one on the highest rated dramas of the channel during its run. However, some critics labelled the show as having a baseless plot.
