= Sammi (TV series) =

Pakistani television series

- Based on: Sammi by Noor-ul-Huda Shah
- Written by: Noor ul Huda Shah
- Directed by: Saife Hassan
- Starring: Mawra Hocane; Adnan Siddiqui; Saman Ansari
- Theme music composer: Sahir Ali Bagga
- Opening theme: Jag Khed'da Phire by Zeb Bangash and Zaheer Abbas; Lyrics by Major Imran Raza
- Composer: Sahir Ali Bagga
- Country of origin: Pakistan
- Original language: Urdu
- No. of episodes: 21

Production
- Producer: Momina Duraid
- Production locations: Rahimabad Rahim Yar Khan District, Punjab, Pakistan
- Editors: Saad Bin Jawed; Jamil Iqbal
- Camera setup: Multi-camera setup
- Running time: 30–45 minutes (minus commercials)
- Production companies: MD Productions and Johns Hopkins University Center for Communication Programs.

Original release
- Network: Hum TV
- Release: 29 January – 25 June 2017

Sammi (Punjabi: سمی) is a Pakistani drama television series about social causes that aired on Hum TV from January to June 2017. It is written by Noor ul Huda Shah and directed by Saife Hassan. Set in rural Rahim Yar Khan, the series centers social issues on the rural society revolving around the concept of Vanni and shows moral lessons against common issues such as gender discrimination. Depicting the Vanni concept, storyline revolves around the journey of Sammi, a young girl who was sold off by her family to the Chaudhry family where her brother had killed her fiancé. Simultaneously it revolves around reality based issues with different characters within the same plot.

The series stars Mawra Hocane as Sammi, Adnan Siddiqui as Rashid Chand, Rehan Sheikh as Chaudhry Rab Nawaz, Sania Saeed as Chandni, Bilal Khan as Aaliyan, Ahad Raza Mir as Salar, Saman Ansari as Salima, Madiha Rizvi as Zulekha Chaudhry and Nadia Afgan as Naheed.

It was co-created and co-produced by the creative head Momina Duraid with Johns Hopkins University Center for Communication Programs. The show was first aired on Hum TV, as a part of night programming all under Duraid's production company.

Sammi received mixed reviews from critics, who praised its bold portrayal of the issues and strong performances, but criticized its excessive melodrama and underdeveloped characters. At the 17th Lux Style Awards, the series received three nominations including Best Television Writer and Best Television Director.

== Plot ==
The series takes place in the village by the name of Rahimabad in the Sadiqabad tehsil, Rahim Yar Khan district. In the area of political landlord Leghari family, on their personal homes and land. The story of a young educated girl Sammi Jutt who is marrying Pervaiz Chaudhry. On the day of her Nikkah, her brother, Waqas, demands extra payment for their Mahr Payment, (a promised amount of money paid by the groom), from Pervaiz. This leads to a physical altercation between them in which Waqas kills Pervaiz in anger. After the cancellation of wedding, Pervaiz's father Fazal insists his younger brother, Rab Nawaz (a political leader and feudal lord of the Rahimabad area of Rahim Yar Khan district), get justice by ordering Waqas killed. However, Sammi's parents beg Rab Nawaz for their son's life and offered their daughter as a Vanni, (selling her off for the sake of their son). Rab Nawaz accepts to their offer and announces Sammi as a Vanni to the entire village. To save Sammi's future, Fazal denies accepting her as Vanni, which leads to chaos. Villagers turn against Rab Nawaz, who decides to wed Sammi off to his twelve-year-old son in order to gain a higher reputation with the village

Since the village has never sought police or law for justice, everyone assists Rab Nawaz. A nerveless Fazal remains silent while Sammi is kept as a captive in Chaudhry's Haveli.

The series also depicts Rashid Chand's family. Rashid is Rab Nawaz's respected servant since his mother Zarina remained his Milk kinship. Zarina and Rashid consider themselves Rab Nawaz's slaves over generations.

Salima, Rashid's wife, receives constant criticism from her mother-in-law because of failed attempts to have a son, resulting in five daughters. This parodies the illiteracy village series and gender discrimination, where woman are blamed for giving birth to daughters.

The series takes a turn when, Zulekha Chaudhry, Rab Nawaz's wife, fears her son's future and asks Rashid to escape with Sammi from the village. Rashid helps Sammi escape from Rahim Yar Khan district and sends her to Karachi to live with Chandni, who was once Rashid's fiancé. In order for Sammi to stay, Chandni tells her to work in her beauty salon. Over time, Sammi gains respect in Chandni's Saloon and Salar (Chandni's Son) begins to develop feelings for her. On the other hand, Salima loses her unborn child and befriends Naheed, her nurse, who is also the victim of gender discrimination. Her brother and sister-in-law took over all the property after their parent's death and forced her to work, taking her salary. During Salima's monthly checkups, Zarina decides to take Rashid's proposal to Naheed's brother.

The story includes Aaliyan, Naheed's nephew, who happens to be Salar's best friend. Naheed has a relationship with Ghulam Rasool, who received criticism from the entire society since he was an illegal child of the parents had committed suicide after his birth. When he brings Naheed's marriage proposal, he is insulted and sent back. Looking to this Naheed decides to secretly marry him. Story takes another turn when Aaliyan is approached to tuition Rab Nawaz's son and Naheed finally marries Ghulam Rasool secretly, she decides return home and reveal the truth after few weeks, after reaching home she finds out that her marriage has been fixed with Rashid Chand. On the other hand, Salar decides to marry Sammi for her protection to which Sammi rejects his offer for marriage, the entire conversation is heard by Chandni who throws Sammi out from her house the next day. Sammi decides to return to Rahim Yar Khan but is stopped by Salar who then gives her shelter in a separate house and begins his Nikkah ceremony to which denies. Where as on the other side, Rab Nawaz finds out about Sammi's escape through Waqas and punished Rashid, where as Zarina is forced to remain silent by Zulekha since she is the only one who knows about her involvement. Salar lies to his mother that he has married Sammi to which she furiously contacts Waqas and reveals him about Sammi's whereabouts. Waqas comes to the house she is in and takes Sammi. Salar tries to find her but dies in a car accident. Waqas tries to burn Sammi in front of the village But Rab Nawaz brings Sammi back to his haveli. He declares that he will marry Sammi. Chandni learns of Salar's death and comes to Rahim Yar Khan. Sammi also finds out that Salar is dead from Aaliyan (whom Chandni told). In the last episode, the higher and respected personality of the village "Peer sahib" (and most sensible one) decides to hand over Waqas to police and free Sammi from the bond of "Vanni". Chandni marries Sammi to Aaliyan and as Rashid takes her to a station Chandni dies. The drama ends with Sammi smiling at Aaliyan.

== Cast ==
- Mawra Hocane as Sammi Jutt
- Sania Saeed as Chandi
- Adnan Siddiqui as Rashid
- Rehan Sheikh as Chaudhry Rab Nawaz
- Saman Ansari as Salima
- Bilal Khan as Aaliyan
- Nadia Afgan as Naheed
- Ahad Raza Mir as Salaar
- Seemi Raheel as Zarina
- Madiha Rizvi as Zulekha Chaudhry
- Haris Waheed as Waqas Jutt
- Irfan Khoosat as Riaz Jutt
- Humaira Ali as Nargis Jutt
- Noor ul Hassan as Fazal-ud-din Jamaluddin (Ba Fazal)
- Kinza Malik as Bilquis
- Beena Chaudhary as Naheed's sister-in-law
- Malik Raza as Naheed's brother

=== Guest appearance ===
- Mirza Zain Baig as Pervaiz (Dead)

== Production ==
=== Development ===
Sammi was developed by Hum TV's senior producer Momina Duraid of MD Productions, and the CEO of the channel Sultana Siddiqui. In late 2016, the channel announced that it will be bringing a TV series similar to Udaari which would be made on noble cause. Siddiqui announced that Sammi was made to address social issues. Commenting on its storyline, Siddiqui stated, "It showed the dark but real side of our society ...... Staying away from glamour, we have tried to present a story that needs our attention". Commenting on the same, Duraid said, "Entertainment with a purpose is what we need to educate the masses". Saife Hassan was hired to direct the series. The story was written by Noorul Huda Shah, who said of her screenplay: "It’s an inspiration from my initial works such as Jungle and Marvi." At the series press conference, she stated, "My message is for those brothers who consider their sisters as their property and deprive them of their basic rights".

Song composition is by Sahir Ali Bagga who had also composed Sajna ve Sajna for the channel's 2016 series Udaari. Background music is given by MAD Music. Zaheer Abbas and vocalist Zeb Bangash were finalised to perform the soundtrack. It marked Bangash's return to the channel after she sang Yar-e-Maan from the 2015 series Diyar-e-Dil.

=== Casting ===
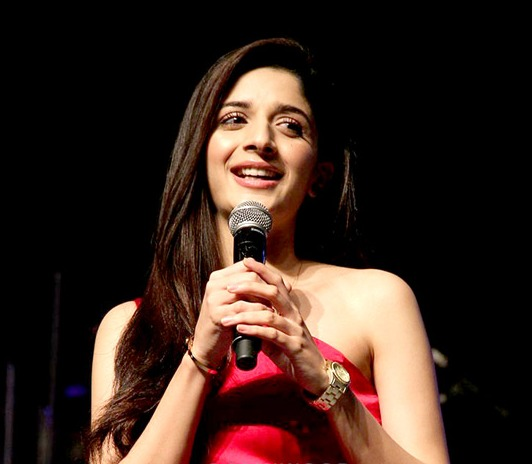
Actress Mawra Hocane makes her television comeback to portray Sammi

Casting of the series began during the filming of TV series Udaari, Duraid, Hassan and Shah mutually chose the cast which includes Mawra Hocane, Adnan Siddiqui, Rehan Sheikh, Sania Saeed, Bilal Khan, Ahad Raza Mir, Saman Ansari, Madiha Rizvi and Nadia Afgan to portray the leading roles. Hocane made her television comeback after 2014 and her Bollywood debut film Sanam Teri Kasam, previously she was finalised to portray the role of Nida Nafees alongside Adnan Malik in channel's series Gypsy, but in mid 2016 its title was changed to Dil Banjaara and it was finalised that actress Sanam Saeed will replace her in Dil Banjaara Talking about her role, she states, "While studying at good colleges and travelling abroad we often forget about girls suffering in the villages, if Sammi gives only one percent hope to girls then I am ready to do ten more shows like it to fix this problem." She termed the role as extremely challenging. Hocane made her second appearance together with Adnan Siddiqui after Aahista Aahista. Siddiqui was finalised to portray the role of Rashid Chand, the village's Chowdhury's hit man. He revealed that he accepted to play the part as he was pressurised by the production house and also to explore a new character. He joined the series after completing his 2016 series Pakeeza for the same channel. Alongside Siddiqui, actress Saman Ansari was finalised to portray the role of Salima, Rashid Chand's wife who depicted the role of a helpless woman surviving in illiterate society. Sania Saeed was cast to portray the role of Chandni after her performance in the 2016 series Sang-e-Mar Mar.

Actors such as Rehan Sheikh, Seemi Raheel, Irfan Khoosat and Malik Raza were also cast. Sheikh was cast for the role of Chaudhry Rab Nawaz, Raheel was finalised to portray the role of a conservative Punjabi villager. Khoosat was finalised to play the role of Riaz Jutt, alongside him Haris Waheed was finalised to portray Waqar Jutt. Malik Raza was also cast in the series where he portrayed the role of Aaliyan's father.

Bilal Khan and Ahad Raza Mir, the son of actor Asif Raza Mir made their television debut with Mir portrayed the role of Salar and Khan portrayed Aaliyan. Nadia Afgan was finalised for the role of Naheed, the actress was given a leading role and was introduced in the fourth episode of the series. Madiha Rizvi was selected for Zulekha Chaudhry, Rab Nawaz's wife. Rizvi found the part one of the most difficult roles for her.

=== Principal photography ===
The series was filmed in a village located in the Rahim Yar Khan District in Punjab, Pakistan. The principal photography lasted for almost a year due to the script arriving in bits and pieces from the writer, leading to changes in the plot and delayed filming.

== Music ==
Sammi OST

Soundtrack album by Zeb Bangash and Zaheer Abbas
- Released: 27 January 2017
- Recorded: 2016
- Genre: Television soundtrack
- Length: 01 Minutes 42 Seconds (1:42)
- Language: Punjabi
- Label: M.D Productions
- Producer: Momina Duraid

Music video
- "Sammi" OST on YouTube

The title song of Sammi was composed by musician Sahir Ali Baaga, lyrics for the song were given by Major Imran Raza, background score for the series is done by Mad Music. The OST was performed by Zeb Bangash with Zaheer Abbas being in the chorus. It marks her Return, since she performed the channels hit drama series Diyar-e-Dil's title song "Yar-e-Man" in 2015. The first half of the soundtrack was released on 27 January 2017. The soundtrack was produced along with series production by Momina Duraid

=== Track listing ===
All lyrics are written by Major Imran Raza; all music is composed by Sahir Ali Bagga.

No.	Title	Artist(s)	Length
1.	"Jag Khed'da Phire Mere Naal"	Zeb Bangash and Zaheer Abbas	6:12

== Release ==
=== Broadcast ===
Sammi was released on 27 January 2017 on Hum TV, with its release it was given the Sundays 8:00pm slot which was maintained by their similar series Udaari and bout a higher viewership to the channel, Sammi replaced Bin Roye which had replaced Udaari in October 2016 but received below average ratings which had its time slot dominated to rival channels. The channel aired a weekly episode for approximately 30–45 minutes (without commercials).. It was aired on Hum Europe in UK, on Hum TV USA in USA and Hum TV Mena on UAE, with same timings and 3 February 2017 being the premier date.

=== Home media and digital release ===
The show was uploaded on YouTube alongside its airing on television but later the channel deleted all its episodes. It was also released on the iflix app as a part of channel's contract with the app but later on, on terminating the contract in 2019, all the episodes were pulled off and thus had no digital availability to stream. Moreover, it was also released on the MX Player app. In July 2019, the channel reuploaded all its episodes with muted music.

== Reception ==
=== Critical reception ===
The premiere episode of Sammi was praised by Mariam Shafique who writes for The Express Tribune, in her editorial Shafique praised the bold issues being highlighted in the series, the characters and the performances of the actors. Writing for the same newspaper, Mahwash Badar praised the performances of Hocane and Saeed, message of the series, but noted that the plot lost its tempo.

While reviewing the initial episodes for DAWN Images, Sadaf Haider moderately praised the series, finding it lacking in authenticity and character depth, but was appreciative of the cast's performances. In a May editorial, Haider reviewed the series after 16 episodes had aired, reiterating praise for the cast's performances. Although she hailed it as a "well-written, well-plotted drama", she noted its lack of engaging pace and emotional resonance. After the conclusion of the series, Haider praises the series for raising awareness about women's issues, performances of the cast, but criticizes for its underdeveloped characters, unnecessary subplots, and a rushed and unrealistic finale.

A reviewer from The News International noted in the editorial of March 2017 that, despite the effective tackling the heavy issues of wani and features strong-willed and inspirational characters, the series' excessive focus on melodrama and tragedy, particularly through secondary characters' storylines, overshadows the main character Sammi's journey and evolution.

== Awards and nominations ==
Date of ceremony	Award	Category	Recipient(s) / nominee(s)	Result	Ref.
21 February 2018	Lux Style Awards	Best Television Director	Saife Hassan	Nominated	
21 February 2018	Lux Style Awards	Best Television Actor	Adnan Siddiqui	Nominated	
21 February 2018	Lux Style Awards	Best Television Writer	Noorul Huda Shah	Nominated	

== See also ==
- List of programs broadcast by Hum TV
- 2017 in Pakistani television
