= Imran Ashraf =

Pakistani actor and writer (born 1989)

Imran Ashraf Awan
- عمران اشرف اعوان
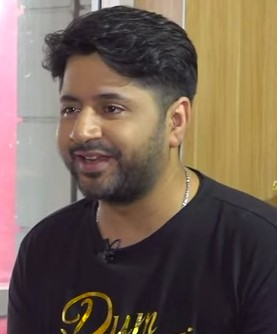
- Imran Ashraf in 2022
- Born: Imran Ashraf Awan; 11 September 1989 (age 37); Peshawar, Khyber Pakhtunkhwa, Pakistan
- Occupations: Actor; Screenwriter; Host
- Years active: 1998–present
- Spouse: Kiran Ashfaq (m. 2018; div. 2022)
- Children: 1

Imran Ashraf Awan (born 11 September 1989) is a Pakistani actor, screenwriter, and host.

Ashraf has been noted for his acting in television serials such as Dil Lagi (2016), Namak Haram, and Raqs-e-Bismil (2020–2021). He is best known for portraying the mentally challenged 'Bhola' in Ranjha Ranjha Kardi (2018–2019) for which he won the Best TV Actor award at the 19th Lux Style Awards.

== Early and personal life ==
Imran Ashraf was born on 11 September 1989 in Peshawar, Khyber Pakhtunkhwa. His father was a banker, while the family roots lie in Sialkot, Punjab.

In 2018, he married Kiran Ashfaq. The couple has a son, Roham Ashraf. They divorced in 2022.

== Career ==
=== Actor ===
After starring as a child in Boota from Toba Tek Singh in 1999, he made his debut as an adult with Wafa Kaisi Kahan Ka Ishq in 2011, having moved to Karachi in 2010 following the failure of the family business.

Further, in 2017, he appeared as a transgender person in Alif Allah Aur Insaan and won an award at the 6th Hum Awards. In 2018, he wrote the drama serial Tabeer and was nominated for Best Writer at the 7th Hum Awards. In 2018, his performance as a mentally challenged Bhola in Kashif Nisar's directed Ranjha Ranjha Kardi established his career as a leading actor and earned him the Lux Style Award for Best TV Actor - Viewer's choice. He is managed by M Models and Talent Management in North America.

=== Screenwriter ===
In 2018, he wrote and acted in Tabeer.

In 2020, he wrote and acted in Mushk.

=== Host ===
In 2023, Ashraf began hosting the comedy talk show Mazaaq Raat.

== Filmography ==
=== Television serials ===
Year	Title	Role	Screenwriter	Network	Notes
1999	Boota from Toba Tek Singh			PTV	Child star
2010-2011	Wafa Kaisi Kahan Ka Ishq	Ghalib		Hum TV	Debut
2012	Nadamat			Hum TV	
2012	Jazeera	Bilal		Urdu 1	
2012	Baandi	Kamyar		ARY Digital	
2012	Ab Ke Sawan Barsay			Express TV	
2012-2013	Hisar E Ishq			Urdu 1	
2013-2015	Meri Maa	Adnan		Geo Entertainment	
2013	Kaala Jadu (season 2)			ARY Digital	
2013	Kohar			Urdu 1	
2013	Noor e Nazar	Imroze		PTV Home	
2013	Woh			Hum TV	
2014	Jhooti			Express TV	
2014	Gumaan			Express TV	
2014	Mere Meherbaan	Shehryar		Hum TV	
2014	Shehr-e-Ajnabi	Sufiyan		A-Plus	
2014	Chingari			Express TV	
2014	Rangbaaz			Express TV	
2014	Noori			TV One	
2014	Sadqay Tumhare			Hum TV	
2014	Meka Aur Susral	Sarmad Chaudhry		ARY Digital	
2014	Roothi Roothi Zindagi			Express TV	
2015	Mohabbat Aag Si	Arshad		Hum TV	
2015	Pardes	Jawad		Hum TV	
2015	Abro	Hamid		Hum TV	
2015	Ishq Nachaya	Ramzi		Express TV	
2015	Faltu Larki	Tabish		A-Plus	
2015	Jhoot	Jamal		Hum TV	
2015-2016	Gul-e-Rana	Ashar		Hum TV	
2016	Dil Lagi	Dastageer		ARY Digital	
2016	Baba Ki Rani	Sajid		ARY Digital	
2016-2017	Bad Gumaan	Jawad		Hum TV	
2016-2017	Shehrnaz	Nofil		Urdu 1	
2016-2017	Khuda Mera Bhi Hai	Zaahir		ARY Digital	
2016-2017	Kitni Girhain Baaki Hain (Season 2)	Various characters		Hum TV	Episode 6, 17, 26, 34
2017	Dil-e-Jaanam	Haris		Hum TV	
2017-2018	Alif Allah Aur Insaan	Shammu		Hum TV	
2017-2018	Toh Dil Ka Kia Hua	Tipu		Hum TV	
2017-2018	Main Maa Nahi Banna Chahti	Faris		Hum TV	
2018	Tabeer	Yasir	Yes	Hum TV	
2018	Paimanay			Urdu 1	
2018	Lashkara	Sunny		ARY Digital	
2018	Dil Mom Ka Diya	Azhar		ARY Digital	
2018	Kabhi Band Kabhi Baja	Hassan		Express TV	Episode 17
2018-2019	Ranjha Ranjha Kardi	Ghulam Mohiuddin; Bhola		Hum TV	
2018-2019	Siskiyan			BOL TV	
2019	Jaal	Zaid		Hum TV	
2019	Inkaar	Rehan Chaudhary		Hum TV	
2019	Rani Nokrani	Abdullah		Express TV	
2019	Kahin Deep Jaley	Zeeshan		Geo Entertainment	
2020-2021	Mushk	Adam	Yes	Hum TV	
2020-2021	Raqs e Bismil	Moosa		Hum TV	
2022	Badzaat	Wali		Geo Entertainment	
2022	Chaudhry and Sons	Billu		Geo Entertainment	
2023	Heer Da Hero	Hero Butt		Geo Entertainment	
2023-2024	Namak Haram	Mureed		Hum TV	
2025	Masoom	Dilshad Faisalabadi		Hum TV	
2026	Ghulam Bashah Sundri	Ghulam		Green Entertainment	

=== Films ===
Year	Title	Role	Director	Notes
2022	Dum Mastam	Sikandar	Mohammed Ehteshamuddin	Debut film
2024	Kattar Karachi	Sikandar	Abdul Wali Baloch	Short film
2025	Enna Nu Rehna Sehna Nai Aunda	Musa Malik	Rupan Ban and Surinder Arora	Debut Punjabi film

=== Television shows ===
Year	Title	Role	Network
2023–present	Mazaaq Raat	Host	Dunya News

=== Music video ===
Year	Title	Details	Ref.
2022	Tera Deewana	By Adnan Dhool	

== Awards and nominations ==
Year	Award	Category	Work	Result	Ref
2017	5th Hum Awards	Best Supporting Actor	Gul-e-Rana	Nominated	
2018	6th Hum Awards	Best Supporting Actor	Alif Allah Aur Insaan	Won	
2018	6th Hum Awards	Most Impactful Character	Alif Allah Aur Insaan	Nominated	
2018	6th Hum Awards	Best On-screen Couple (with Ushna Shah)	Alif Allah Aur Insaan	Nominated	
2019	7th Hum Awards	Best Writer Drama Serial	Tabeer	Nominated	
2020	19th Lux Style Awards	Best TV Actor (Viewers' Choice)	Ranjha Ranjha Kardi	Won	
2021	20th Lux Style Awards	Best TV Actor (Viewers' Choice)	Kahin Deep Jale	Nominated	
2022	8th Hum Awards	Best Actor Popular	Raqs e Bismil	Nominated	
2022	8th Hum Awards	Best Actor Jury	Raqs e Bismil	Nominated	
2022	8th Hum Awards	Best On-screen Couple (with Sarah Khan)	Raqs e Bismil	Nominated	
2022	21st Lux Style Awards	Best TV Actor (Viewers' Choice)	Raqs e Bismil	Nominated	
2022	21st Lux Style Awards	Best TV Actor (Critics' Choice)	Raqs e Bismil	Nominated	
2023	22nd Lux Style Awards	Best Film Actor	Dum Mastam	Nominated	
2025	10th Hum Awards	Best Actor - Popular	Namak Haram	Nominated	
2025	10th Hum Awards	Best Actor - Jury	Namak Haram	Nominated	
2025	10th Hum Awards	Best On-screen Couple - Popular (with Sarah Khan)	Namak Haram	Nominated	
2025	10th Hum Awards	Best On-screen Couple - Jury (with Sarah Khan)	Namak Haram	Nominated	
2025	10th Hum Awards	Most Impactful Character	Namak Haram	Nominated	
2025	24th Lux Style Awards	Best TV Actor (Viewers' Choice)	Namak Haram	Nominated	
2025	24th Lux Style Awards	Film Actor of the Year - Male	Kattar Karachi	Nominated	
