= Teri Raah Main Rul Gai =

Television series

- Genre: Social drama Family drama
- Written by: Maimoona Khursheed
- Directed by: Amin Iqbal
- Starring: Samiya Mumtaz; Sami Khan; Yumna Zaidi; Ayesha Gul
- Country of origin: Pakistan
- Original language: Urdu
- No. of seasons: 01
- No. of episodes: 24

Production
- Producers: Asif Raza Mir; Babar Javed
- Production location: Pakistan
- Editors: Fawad Khan; M Abbas Naqvi
- Running time: Approx 40 Minutes
- Production company: A&B Entertainment

Original release
- Network: Urdu 1
- Release: 6 October 2012 – 24 February 2013

Teri Raah Main Rul Gai is a 2012 Pakistani drama serial directed by Amin Iqbal, produced by Asif Raza Mir and Babar Javed under their production banner A&B Entertainment and written by Maimoona Khursheed. The drama stars Samiya Mumtaz, Sami Khan and Yumna Zaidi in lead roles. The drama was first aired 6 October 2012 on Urdu 1, where it aired every Monday at 9:00 P.M. The drama was based on Maimoona Khursheed's novel of the same name.

== Cast ==
- Samiya Mumtaz
- Sami Khan
- Yumna Zaidi
- Ayesha Gul
- Farah Tufail
- Rasheed Naz
- Shaista Jabeen
- Ali Tabish
- Inam Khan
- Hassan Noman
- Samina Butt

== Soundtrack ==
Theme song of the drama is sung by Fariha Pervez and Shehryar Tiwana.

=== Track listing ===
All lyrics are written by Asad Ali Shah; all music is composed by Raheel Fayyaz.

No.	Title	Artist(s)	Length
1.	"Teri Raah Main Rul Gai"	Fariha Pervez Shehryar Tiwana	6:23
