= Meri Dulari =

Pakistani drama TV serial

- Genre: Drama
- Written by: Nabeela Abar Raja
- Directed by: Amin Iqbal
- Starring: Sami Khan; Yumna Zaidi; Sana Askari; Nazli Nasr
- Country of origin: Pakistan
- Original language: Urdu
- No. of episodes: 26

Production
- Production location: Pakistan
- Camera setup: Multi-camera setup
- Running time: 30–40 minutes
- Production company: A & B Entertainment

Original release
- Network: Geo Entertainment
- Release: 13 March 2013

Meri Dulari (Urdu: میری دلاری, English: My favorite) is a 2013 Pakistani drama serial directed by Amin Iqbal. The serial aired on Geo TV from 13 March 2013. It is written by Nabeela Abar Raja and produced by A & B Entertainment. It stars Sami Khan, Yumna Zaidi, Sana Askari and Nazli Nasr.

== Plot ==
Abdaar is slightly rebellious and initially behaves like a child. She lives with her grandfather and her mother. The other family members condemn both the mother and daughter, who are always finding ways to blame them. Another family is of Bibijan and her two sons, one is Ghalib (Taifoor Khan), and the other one is Yawar. Initially, mischief-makers try to defame Abdaar and succeed as her engagement is broken off. Will the truth reveal itself later on? What will be the consequences?

== Cast ==
- Yumna Zaidi as Abdar
- Sami Khan as Yawar
- Saba Hameed
- Sana Askari
- Manzoor Qureshi
- Nazli Nasr
- Taifoor Khan
- Sana Javed
