= Aisha Uqbah Malik =

Pakistani actress (born 1982)

- عائشہ عقبہ ملک
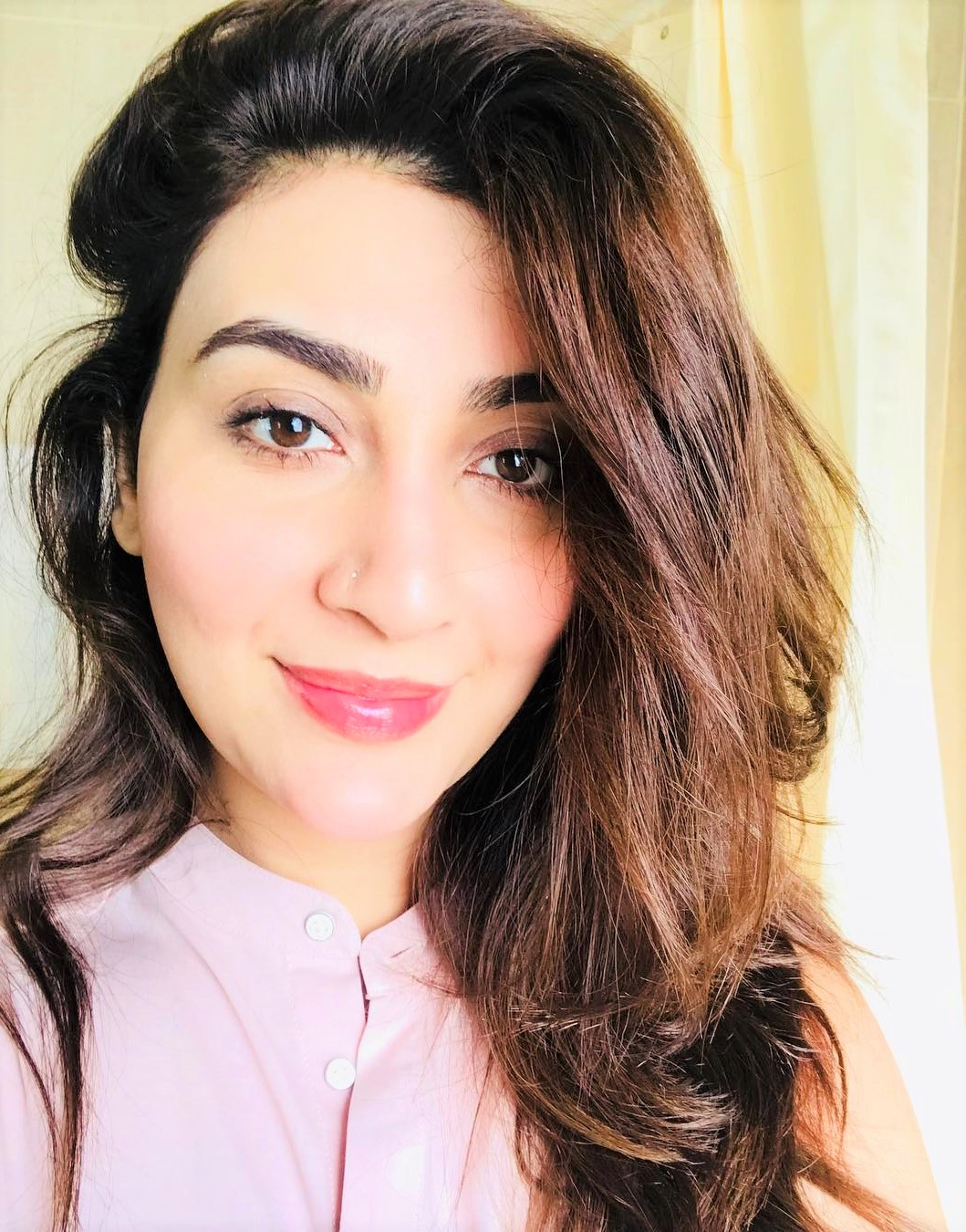
- Born: 27 September 1982 (age 44); Karachi, Sindh, Pakistan
- Occupations: Actress, model
- Years active: 1998–2018
- Spouse: Major Uqbah Hadeed Malik (m. 2018)
- Children: 2
- Relatives: Asma Qadeer (mother-in-law)

Aisha Uqbah Malik (born 27 September 1982), also known by her name Aisha Khan, is a Pakistani former television and film actress. Her prominent roles include Mahgul from Khuda Mera Bhi Hai, Noor from Noor-e-Zindagi, and Jeena from Mann Mayal.

== Retirement ==
In March 2018, Khan announced her retirement from the media industry, citing she had "moved onto the next phase of life".

== Personal life ==
In April 2018, Khan married her fiancé, Major Uqbah Hadeed Malik,whom she met through her mother-in-law, who is a politician and former MNA Asma Qadeer.

== Career ==
Malik had her first breakthrough in the year 2003 with the drama Mehndi, playing a mature and competent housewife.

Her first role in 2007 was of a selfless and loving prostitute in the romance-drama Manay Na Ye Dil. She began the year 2008 with her portrayal of a possessive and secret lover of the male protagonist in the drama Khamoshiyaan. Khan felt that with these two serials, her girl-next-door image came under considerable flak.

Malik had her first role in 2009, was a brief part, a strong-headed Pashtun woman whose fiancé marries in Malaysia and settles there in the drama Mehman. She was convinced by director Zeba Bakhtiar to take on the role after learning about the Pashtun background of Malik. The same year, Malik portrayed a fearless and courageous lover who can go to any lengths to win the man she loves in the romance-drama Haroon Tou Piya Teri. The series was based on Faiza Iftikhar's novel "Dasi Dholan Yaar Di", and her performance in it earned her the Best Drama Actress award at the Pakistan Media Awards, held in 2010.

In 2015, Malik portrayed Dil Meher in the love triangle-themed Dil Ishq.

Malik's career saw a resurgence with her first project of 2016, an antagonistic portrayal of Jeena, the manipulative and obsessed lover, in the romance-drama Mann Mayal. Alongside the popularity, Khan also received online hate due to her villainous portrayal. Her next role was the generous and well-educated Noor Jehan coping with his marriage to a narrow-minded grocery store owner in the drama Noor-e-Zindagi. Malik concluded the year with her portrayal of a resilient mother struggling for the rights of her intersex child in the social-drama Khuda Mera Bhi Hai.

== Filmography ==
=== Television ===
Year	Title	Role	Original broadcasting network
1998	Ghaazi Shaheed		PTV
2003	Jarray Ka Chand		PTV
2003	Mehndi	Sajjal	PTV
2005	Shiddat		Hum TV
2007	Manay Na Ye Dil	Roshni	Hum TV
2007	Muqadas	Mehwish	ARY Digital
2008	Khamoshiyan	Rhea	Hum TV
2008	Meri Adhoori Mohabbat		Geo TV
2008	Mujhay Apna Bana Lo	Priya/Rabia	Hum TV
2008	Socha Na Tha	Sonia	ARY Digital
2008	Chaar Chaand	Raima	Geo TV
2009	Nestlé Nesvita Women of Strength '09	Host	Geo TV
2009	Mehman	Nargis	Ary Digital
2009	Mulaqat		Hum TV
2009	Man-O-Salwa	Zari	Hum TV
2009	Haroon Tou Piya Teri	Gul	TV One
2009	Maasi Aur Malika	Samina	Geo TV
2009	Khuda Zameen Se Gaya Nahin	Gulbano	Hum TV
2009	Bol Meri Machli	Sahaab	Geo TV
2010	Vasl	Hina	Hum TV
2010	Ijazat	Muqaddas	Ary Digital
2010	Choti Si Kahani	Rushna	PTV
2010	Chein Aaye Naa		Geo TV
2010	Parsa	Parsa/Pari	Hum TV
2011	Lamha Lamha Zindagi	Sabeen	Ary Digital
2011	Zip Bus Chup Raho	Parveen	Geo TV
2011	Tum Ho Ke Chup	Mishal	Geo TV
2011	Mere Charagar	Abeeha	Geo TV
2011	Kuch Pyar Ka Pagalpan	Daneez	Ary Digital
2011	Jab Naam Pukarey Jaye ge		AAJ TV
2011	Kaafir	Izat	Ary Digital
2012	Maseeha	Abish	Hum TV
2012	Badi Aapa	Neelam	Hum TV
2013	Mujhe Khuda Pe Yaqeen Hai	Narmeen	Hum TV
2013	Shukk	Sehrish	Ary Digital
2013	Na Mehram	Amna	TV One
2014	Saathiya	Fariya	TV One
2014	Soteli	Fariha	Ary Digital
2014	Mehram	Iqra	Hum TV
2015	Shert	Momal	Urdu1
2015	Dil Ishq	Dil Meher	Geo Entertainment
2015	Vasl-e-Yaar	Anaya	Ary Digital
2015	Tumhare Siwa	Rania	Hum TV
2016	Mann Mayal	Jeena	Hum TV
2016	Noor-e-Zindagi	Noor	Geo Entertainment
2016	Khuda Mera Bhi Hai	Mah Gull	ARY Digital
2016	Miss Veet Pakistan 2016	Herself / Judge	Hum TV and other channels
2017	Woh Aik Pal	Unaiza	Hum TV
2018	Meri Nanhi Pari	Shiza	ARY Digital

=== Films ===
Year	Name	Character	Notes
2013	Waar	Javeria	
2013	Abhi Tou Main Jawan Hoon	Zara	Telefilm
2015	Jawani Phir Nahi Ani	Kubra	
2018	Jawani Phir Nahi Ani 2	Kubra	Voice cameo

== Awards ==
Year	Award	Category	Work	Result	Ref(s).
2010	Pakistan Media Awards	Best TV Actress	Haroon Tou Piya Teri	Won	

== See also ==
- List of Pakistani actresses
