= Sohail Sameer =

Pakistani actor

- Born: Sohail Sameer; 19 February 1980 (age 46); Lahore, Punjab, Pakistan
- Occupation: Actor
- Years active: 2002–present

Sohail Sameer is a Pakistani actor who appears in television series and films. He began his career as a child actor on PTV. He got recognition for his role as Nazakat Ali in Hum TV's 2018 romantic comedy Suno Chanda.

== Early life ==
Born in Lahore and brought up in Rawalpindi by an uncle, he matriculated from the F. G. Sir Syed College and later graduated from the Government College Asghar Mall before going into acting after being spotted by Savera Nadeem.

== Career ==
He began his career as a model in 2002.

== Filmography ==
=== Television serials ===
Year	Title	Role	Network	Notes
2006	Taqdeer	Sameer	PTV Home	Leading role
2007	Cousins	Zeeshan	PTV Home	Supporting role
2008	Qaatil		Aaj TV	Leading role
2009	Teri Ik Nazar		Geo Entertainment	Supporting role
2009	Wafa Hum Nibhain Gay	Asad	PTV Home	Leading role
2010	Lahore Junction		PTV Home	Supporting role
2010	Kalmoohi	Dr. Adil	PTV Home	Leading role
2011	Jeena To Hai		PTV Home	Leading role
2012	Ashk	Bilal	Geo TV	Supporting role
2013	Heer Ranjha	Murad Baloch	PTV Home	Leading role
2013	Taar-e-Ankaboot		Geo Entertainment	Supporting role
2013	Ghundi	Saqib	Hum Sitaray	Leading role
2014	Malika-e-Aliya	Furqan Baig	Geo Entertainment	Supporting role
2014	Code Name Red		PTV Home	Leading role
2014	Tum Mere Hi Rehna		Hum TV	Supporting role
2014	Pehchaan	Mansoor	PTV Home	Leading role
2015	Sawaab	Kamal	Hum TV	Supporting role
2015	Sartaj Mera Tu Raj Mera		Hum TV	Leading role
2016	Jaan'nisar	Inspector Junaid	ATV	Leading role
2016	Baba Ki Rani	Ajmal	ARY Zindagi	Supporting role
2016	Haya Kay Rang	Sheharyaar	ARY Zindagi	Supporting role
2017	Bachay Bara e Farookht		Urdu1	Supporting role
2017	Adhoora Bandhan	Safdar Hussain	Geo Entertainment	Supporting role
2017	Namak		PTV Home	Supporting role
2018	Karam Jali	Sharafat	A-Plus Entertainment	Leading role
2018	Saaya	Rashid	Geo Entertainment	Leading role
2018	Suno Chanda	Nazakat Ali	Hum TV	Supporting role
2018	Zainab		A-Plus TV	Supporting role
2019	Suno Chanda 2	Nazakat Ali	Hum TV	Supporting role
2019	Makafaat		Geo Entertainment	Episode 4
2019	Naqab Zan		Hum TV	Supporting role
2019	Malaal e Yaar	Malik Wajahat	Hum TV	Supporting role
2019	Makafaat		Geo Entertainment	Episode 19
2020	Mushk	Sajjad	Hum TV	Supporting role
2021	Khuda Aur Muhabbat (season 3)	Nazim Shah	Geo Entertainment	Supporting role; negative role
2021	Juda Huay Kuch Is Tarha	Javed	Hum TV	Supporting role
2021–22	Ishq E Laa	Sultan	Hum TV	Supporting role
2022	Pehchaan	Haider	Hum TV	Supporting role
2022	Guddu	Daud	Geo Entertainment	Leading role
2022	Teri Rah Mein	Faisal	ARY Digital	Supporting role
2022	Kaala Doriya	Shuja	Hum TV	Supporting role
2022	Tere Bin	Anwar Khan	Geo Entertainment	Supporting role; negative role
2023	Sawal Ana Ka Tha	Zaviyar	Aan TV	Leading role
2023	Apney Hee Tou Hain	Shahid	Green Entertainment	Leading role
2023	Gumn	Inspector Jahangir	Green Entertainment	Supporting role
2024	Inspector Sabiha	Inspector Shah	Express Entertainment	Supporting role
2024	Teri Chhaon Mein	Muzaffar	Hum TV	Supporting role
2024	Ishq Hua	Bahar	Geo Entertainment	Leading role; main antagonist
2024	Aafat	Mukhtar	Geo Entertainment	Supporting role
2024	Aye Ishq e Junoon	Barrister Farrukh Kamal	ARY Digital	Supporting role
2025	Dayan	Amir	Geo Entertainment	Supporting role

=== Films ===
Year	Title	Role	Director	Additional notes
2016	Saya e Khuda e Zuljalal	Major Faraz	Umair S. Fazli	Film debut
2017	Whistle		Ammad Azhar	
2021	Aik Hai Nigar	Nigar's father	Adnan Sarwar	Television film
2022	Rehbra		Amin Iqbal	
2022	Joyland	Saleem	Saim Sadiq	

== Awards and nominations ==
Year	Ceremony	Category	Project	Result
2012	17th PTV Awards	Best Actor (Jury)	Jeena To Hai	Nominated
2012	17th PTV Awards	Best Actor (Viewers)	Jeena To Hai	Nominated
2016	4th Hum Awards	Best Soap Actor Male	Sartaj Mera Tu Raj Mera	Won
