= Zindagi Tamasha =

2019 film

- Poster
- Directed by: Sarmad Khoosat
- Written by: Nirmal Bano
- Produced by: Kanwal Khoosat
- Starring: Arif Hassan; Samiya Mumtaz; Eman Suleman; Ali Kureshi
- Cinematography: Khizer Idrees
- Music by: Saakin; Shamsher Rana
- Production company: Khoosat Films
- Distributed by: IMGC Global
- Release dates: 6 October 2019 (Busan); 4 August 2023 (Pakistan)
- Running time: 138 minutes
- Country: Pakistan
- Languages: Urdu; Punjabi

Zindagi Tamasha (Urdu: زندگی تماشا), titled Circus of Life in English, is a 2019 Pakistani drama film directed by Sarmad Khoosat. It premiered at the 24th Busan International Film Festival on 6 October 2019 and went on to win notable awards at Busan (BIFF 2019), 2020 Mosaic International South Asian Film Festival (MISAFF20), 23rd UK Asian Film Festival and the 6th Asian World Film Festival. Zindagi Tamasha was selected as Pakistan's entry for the Best International Feature Film at the 93rd Academy Awards, but was not nominated.

The release of the film was repeatedly delayed due to censorship concerns and protests by Tehreek-e-Labbaik Pakistan. After multiple delayed releases and the censorship it faced, Sarmad eventually released it on YouTube and Vimeo on 4 August 2023. Later, it was also made available on myco app. In a groundbreaking move, TikTok collaborated with Khoosat Films to bring Zindagi Tamasha to its platform, marking the first-ever full-length film release on the popular short-form video app.

== Plot ==
A devout Muslim who writes, composes, and even records hymns praising the Prophet Muhammad, Rahat is a respected elderly man who works in real estate and takes care of his bedridden wife. One day, he attends the wedding of a friend's son, where he inadvertently shows off a dance in front of his friends. His dance gets recorded and then uploaded to social media, which then gets broadcast on television. And the chaos begins to ensue in his quiet life. Other than his wife, no one else in the world understands Rahat's circumstances. His daughters and neighbors criticize his actions, his friends turn their backs on him. Circus of Life provides a calm and detailed picture of challenging issues, in a strict Muslim society and an elderly man's search for identity who gradually comes to realize his "minoritiness".

== Cast ==
- Arif Hassan as Rahat Khawaja; a devout Muslim who becomes victim of a leaked video
- Samiya Mumtaz as Farkhanda; Rahat's bedridden wife
- Eman Suleman as Sadaf; Rahat and Farkhanda's daughter
- Ali Kureshi as Danish; Sadaf's husband
- Faani Jan as Faisal; Rahat's friend, Asad's father
- Arslan Khan as Asad; Faisal's son
- Adeel Afzal as Usman; a DVD shop owner
- Shahrus Khan as Muzammil; leaks Rahat's dancing video
- Zoya Uzair as Amara; Sadaf's co-producer
- Sikandar Nawaz Rajpoot as young eunuch; eunuch in Rahat's neighborhood

=== Cameos ===
- Nadia Afgan as Saira; TV show host
- Mehar Bano as cousin
- Sarmad Khoosat as dancer
- Adnan Jahangir as classical dancer

== Production ==
Zindagi Tamasha, the title of the film, is inspired by the eponymous song of the film Naukar Wohti Da (1974), the rights of which were purchased by Sarmad Khoosat. The film is produced by Khoosat's sister, Kanwal Khoosat and written by Nirmal Bano. The film features Arif Hassan, Eman Suleman, Samiya Mumtaz and Ali Kureshi.

This film shows an intimate portrait of a family who lives in Lahore.

== Release ==
Zindagi Tamasha premiered at the 24th Busan International Film Festival on 6 October 2019 under the section "A Window on Asian Cinema". The film was set to release on 24 January 2020 under the banner of Khoosat Films, however, Pakistan's Central Film Censor Board asked director of film to approach the Council of Islamic Ideology for critically reviewing his film, after which its release was postponed due to the widespread protests by the political party Tehreek-e-Labbaik Pakistan against the release of the film.

It was then decided to release the film in theaters on 18 March 2022 as announced in the trailer which was re-released in December 2021. However, the release was postponed and the reasons were remain hidden.

In August 2023, the film was then decided to release on YouTube and Vimeo as announced by Khoosat who stated that he wanted to free his film in this month of Independence. He was referring to Pakistan's independence, gained in August 1947. The film was eventually released on 4 August 2023 on YouTube.

== Reception ==
=== Critical reception ===
The Guardian described the film as "haunting and elegiac," following a man whose world breaks apart after an innocuous video goes viral, and noted that it is "delicate" and avoids sensationalism. In an opinion piece for The New York Times, Mohammed Hanif highlighted the bitter irony of the film being banned in Pakistan despite having been cleared by censors and selected as the country's Oscar entry, stating it "offends some people who haven't even seen it." The Wire called it a "gem from Pakistan," praising how it "interrogates a society riddled with dogma and rigidity" and examines the hypocrisy of a community that shuns a man for a fleeting moment of joy. JoySauce described it as a "stunning and methodical work of social realism that weighs heavy on the heart," noting its distinct queer undercurrent and the profound impact of the controversy surrounding its release.

In a review for The Express Tribune, the film was rated 3.5/5 and called a "film done right," with its handling of the subject matter described as "masterfully subtle." The review noted that its ordinariness paradoxically enhances the tragedy, leaving the viewer with "an unexplained sense of agony." Frontline Magazine described it as a "marvellously crafted critique" with "exquisite elegance," "masterful composure," and a "wonderfully minimal" soundtrack. The Friday Times praised the film's "effortless story telling" that unfolds "without any big confrontational dialogues or melodramatic sequences," calling it an "embodiment of ordinary culture." PakistaniCinema.Net praised the film's "subdued" performances and its exploration of how "society slowly kills our individualism," calling it as "close to real life as it gets."

== Soundtrack ==
The soundtrack was composed and produced by Saakin and released on 9 November 2019.

Track listing
No.	Title	Singer(s)	Length
1.	"Alley"	Saakin	3:00
2.	"Apology"	Saakin	3:06
3.	"Circus"	Saakin	3:15
4.	"Farewell"	Saakin	3:56
5.	"Sik Mitraan"	Saakin	4:40
6.	"Shame"	Saakin	1:46
7.	"Wish"	Saakin	2:11
8.	"Zindagi Tamasha Bani"	Saakin, Nimra Gilani	4:53
Total length:			27:47

== Accolades ==
Year	Award / Film Festival	Category	Recipient(s)	Result	Ref.
2019	24th Busan International Film Festival	Kim Ji-Seok Award	Zindagi Tamasha	Won	
2020	Mosaic International South Asian Film Festival (MISAFF)	Sabeen Mahmud Award for Courage in Cinema	Zindagi Tamasha	Won	
2020	Mosaic International South Asian Film Festival (MISAFF)	Best Ensemble	Zindagi Tamasha	Won	
2020	Mosaic International South Asian Film Festival (MISAFF)	Best International Feature	Zindagi Tamasha	Won	
2021	Indie Meme Film Festival	Audience Choice Award for Narrative Feature	Zindagi Tamasha	Won	
2021	UK Asian Film Festival	Best Film	Zindagi Tamasha	Won	
2021	6th Asian World Film Festival	Snow Leopard Award for Best Film	Zindagi Tamasha	Won	
2021	6th Asian World Film Festival	Snow Leopard Award for Best Actor	Arif Hassan	Won	

== Controversy ==
After releasing its first teaser, this film become controversial. Its teaser was removed from YouTube. The release of the film was suspended after religious uproar. Tehreek-e-Labbaik Pakistan's Khadim Hussain Rizvi promoted protests on the release of this film. Rizvi further accused Khoosat of blasphemy. The supposedly "blasphemous" material includes criticism of ulama and an alleged reference to bacha bazi.

Detractors of Rizvi were quick to point out that suggest criticism of ulama is blasphemous, may in itself constitute blasphemy as it implies ulama hold sacred or holy rank. Rizvi was also criticized for using charges of blasphemy to prevent criticism of religious fundamentalism. No charges against Rizvi have been filed at this point for engaging in blasphemy. A petition against TLP was subsequently filed by Irfan Ali Khoosat, director of Khoosat Films. The Sindh government also banned the film.

== See also ==
- List of submissions to the 93rd Academy Awards for Best International Feature Film
- List of Pakistani submissions for the Academy Award for Best International Feature Film
- Saakin
