= Munazzah Arif =

Pakistani actress

- Born: 18 March 1968 (age 58); Lahore, Pakistan
- Education: Lahore College for Women University
- Occupation: Actress
- Years active: 2007 – present
- Children: 3

Munazzah Arif is a Pakistani actress who predominantly appears in Pakistani television serials. She earlier starred as recurring roles and mostly plays the role of mothers. She made her cinematic debut in Azfar Jafri's film Heer Maan Ja and later starred in Parde Mein Rehne Do. Some of her notable television appearances in supporting roles include Uraan, Inkaar, Kashf and Khuda Aur Muhabbat.

== Filmography ==
=== Television series ===
| Year | Title | Role | Network |
|---|---|---|---|
| 2012 | Zindagi Ki Rah Mein | Salma | PTV |
| 2012 | Koi Meray Dil Say Pouchay | Shaista Begum | PTV |
| 2013 | Numm | Rahat Akbar Khan | Geo Entertainment |
| 2013 | Jaan Hatheli Par | Kashifa's aunt | Urdu 1 |
| 2014 | Do Saal Ki Aurat | Faria | Hum TV |
| 2014 | Ek Mohabbat Kay Baad | Ahmer's mother | ARY Digital |
| 2015 | Ishqaaway | Alams | Geo Entertainment |
| 2015 | Sangat | Aisha's aunt | Hum TV |
| 2015 | Pardes | Fariha | Hum Sitaray |
| 2015–16 | Aangan Mein Deewar | Laila | PTV Home |
| 2016 | Bhai | Sabiha | A-Plus |
| 2016 | Intezaar | Nafisa | A-Plus |
| 2016 | Kaun Karta Hai Wafa | Sobia's mother | A-Plus |
| 2016 | Marzi | Manaal's aunt | Geo TV |
| 2016 | Dumpukht - Aatish-e-Ishq | Rabia | A-Plus |
| 2016 | Khuda Aur Muhabbat Season 2 | Najma | Geo Entertainment |
| 2017 | Meherbaan | Ismat | A-Plus |
| 2017 | Adhi Gawahi | Ayesha | Hum TV |
| 2017 | Shayad | Naila | Geo Entertainment |
| 2017 | Yaqeen Ka Safar | Rukhsana | Hum TV |
| 2017 | Mohabbat Khawab Safar | Najma | Hum TV |
| 2017 | Dar Si Jaati Hai Sila | Nausheen | Hum TV |
| 2018 | De Ijazat | Dua's aunt | Hum TV |
| 2018 | Kahan Ho Tum | Sitara Jahan | A-Plus |
| 2018 | Aik Larki Aam Si | Sadia | Hum TV |
| 2018 | Main Khwab Bunti Hon | Bilquis Begum | Hum TV |
| 2018 | Ranjha Ranjha Kardi | Rizwana | Hum TV |
| 2018 | Bisaat e Dil | Fatima | Hum TV |
| 2019 | Inkaar | Rehan's stepmother | Hum TV |
| 2019 | Uraan | Naheed Begum | A-Plus |
| 2019 | Ajnabi Lage Zindagi | Rubab Begum | LTN Family |
| 2019 | Ehd-e-Wafa | Shahzain's mother | Hum TV |
| 2020 | Kashf | Dilshad | Hum TV |
| 2020 | Qurbatain | Shumaila | Hum TV |
| 2020 | Tum Se Kehna Tha | Zeenat | Hum TV |
| 2021 | Khuda Aur Muhabbat Season 3 | Chanda | Geo Entertainment |
| 2021 | Laapata | Rukhsana | Hum TV |
| 2021 | Dikhawa Season 2 | Shagufta | Geo Entertainment |
| 2021 | Tehra Aangan | Tabinda | Express Entertainment |
| 2021 | Ishq Jalebi | Nudrat | Geo TV |
| 2021 | Sinf-e-Aahan | Agnes | ARY Digital |
| 2022 | Hum Tum | Haleema Sultan | Hum TV |
| 2022 | Dikhawa Season 3 | Yasir's mother | Geo Entertainment |
| 2022 | Meray Humnasheen | Safoora | Geo TV |
| 2022 | Nehar | Ishrat | Hum TV |
| 2022 | Tere Bina Mein Nahi | Asifa | ARY Digital |
| 2023 | Heer Da Hero | Nimmi | Geo Entertainment |
| 2023 | Tere Ishq Ke Naam | Sanobar | ARY Digital |
| 2023 | Fatima Feng | Saima | Green Entertainment |
| 2023 | Kabuli Pulao | Zubaida | Green Entertainment |
| 2023 | Tumhare Husn Ke Naam | Safiya Begum | Green Entertainment |
| 2024 | Ghaata | Sajida | Geo Entertainment |
| 2024 | Dil-e-Nadan | Nigar | Geo Entertainment |
| 2024 | Kaisi Hai Ye Ruswai | Ruqaiya | Express Entertainment |
| 2025 | Dil Wali Gali Mein | Lubna | Hum TV |
| 2025 | Ism-e-Yaraan | Tahira | Hum TV |
| 2025 | Sher | Tehmina | ARY Digital |
| 2025 | Kafeel | Yasmeen | ARY Digital |
| 2025 | Pehli Barish | Naveeda | Geo Entertainment |
| 2026 | Khush Naseebi | Mona | Geo TV |

=== Telefilm ===
| Year | Title | Role |
|---|---|---|
| 2023 | Aap Kay Ajanay Say | Shakila |

=== Film ===
| Year | Title | Role |
|---|---|---|
| 2019 | Heer Maan Ja | Wajdan's mother |
| 2022 | Parde Mein Rehne Do | Shani's mother |
