= Ajnabi Lage Zindagi =

Pakistani television series

- Written by: Atta ullah Ali
- Directed by: Mohammad Ashar Asghar
- Country of origin: Pakistan
- Original language: Urdu
- No. of episodes: 30

Production
- Producer: Naveed Akbar
- Running time: 37–40 minutes
- Production company: LTN Productions

Original release
- Network: LTN Family
- Release: 23 April – 19 November 2019

Ajnabi Lage Zindagi is a Pakistani drama television series that aired on LTN Family from 23 April to 19 November 2019. Written by Atta ullah Ali and directed by Mohammad Ashar Asghar, it was produced by Naveed Akbar under LTN Productions. The series stars Momina Iqbal, Arslan Asad Butt, Arman Ali Pasha, and Ammara Butt in leading roles.

== Plot ==
The series centres on Tabeer, a young woman who has no say in the choice of her marriage partner. The drama presents this not as an isolated case but as a reflection of entrenched social norms that historically place the burden of compliance on women. Tabeer's husband, Ahmar, is not depicted as a villain; rather, he too is shaped by the pressures of the society around him, leaving society itself as the implicit antagonist of the story.

As the narrative develops, the series takes on further social themes: the assumption that wealth ensures happiness, the tendency to hold a newly wedded woman responsible for domestic misfortune, and the stigma surrounding divorce. A generational tension runs through the storyline as well, with younger characters questioning the class-conscious and tradition-bound values of their elders.

== Cast ==
- Momina Iqbal as Tabeer
- Arslan Asad Butt as Ahmar
- Arman Ali Pasha as Azaan
- Ammara Butt as Zara
- Munazzah Arif as Rubab Begum
- Zain Afzal as Fahad
- Ismat Iqbal as Hafsa (Tabeer's mother)
- Saima Saleem as Tahira
- Iqra Qaiser as Abeer
- Haseeb Khan

== Soundtrack ==
The original soundtrack was composed by Irfan Chaudry, with lyrics by Fatima Tanveer and vocals by Jabir Abbas and Maria Meer.
