= Kuch Pyar Ka Pagalpan =

2011 Pakistani television series

- Genre: Drama; Romance
- Written by: Samira Fazal
- Directed by: Haissam Hussain
- Starring: Sanam Baloch; Fawad Khan; Ayesha Khan; Mikaal Zulfiqar
- Theme music composer: Waqar Ali
- Opening theme: Kuch Pyar Ka Pagal Pan Bhi Tha performed by Rahat Fateh Ali Khan
- Country of origin: Pakistan
- Original language: Urdu
- No. of episodes: 23

Production
- Producers: Samina Humayun Saeed; Shahzad Nasib
- Running time: 40–42 minutes
- Production company: Six Sigma

Original release
- Network: ARY Digital
- Release: 23 September 2011 – 10 March 2012

Kuch Pyar Ka Pagalpan (Urdu: کچھ پيار کا پاگل پن ; English – Some Insanity of Love) is a Pakistani television serial, written by Samira Fazal, directed by Haissam Hussain, and broadcast on the ARY Digital network in Pakistan. Fawad Khan, Ayesha Khan, Sanam Baloch and Mikaal Zulfiqar played the leads. The series is about a middle-class younger engineer from Lahore who gets his dream of working in the US true, and when he finally lands there he realises the reality and becomes entangled in a web of complex relationships.

The series also aired in India on Zindagi under the title Kuch Pyaar Ka Paagalpan Bhi Tha.

== Plot ==
Mujtaba, a computer engineer from Iqbal Town, Lahore, dreams of going USA through his uncle, Taimoor. His parents discuss this with his uncle who calls him there. Mujtaba comes across the problems there due to the cultural change and his perceptions of getting an instant job at a reputable position. However, he faces the reality when he has to work in his uncle's factory as a worker. His uncle's daughter Danize and her cousin Shamraiz taunt him always for being a low standard Pakistani with a same background. Danize plots a trap to tarnishing the image of Tanya, her neighbour and childhood classfellow, with whom her parents have always compared her. Alongwith her, she also makes Mujtaba's repute bad leading to the loss of Mujtaba's self-respect. He leaves their house and lives in a house as a rentee. The house comes out of Kiran, her manager of the factory. He and Kiran do nothing all day except arguing, at the factory and even in house. At times, he takes a stand for her when her family abuses without any reason. On the other hand, Tanya's photoshopped images reached everywhere on interest and she suicides leaving a note for Danize where she mentions that she considered her as her best friend her whole life but doesn't celebrate it openly. Danize feels guilty after considering herself as the preparator. Mujtaba, visits his uncle and learners about Danize's condition and urges her not to hurt herself instead kill her jealousy and selfishness which has led to her death. She eventually returns to normal life and her personality changes completely afterwards.

Kiran and Mujtaba begin to spend some quality time with each other and get a chance to better understand each other. Reasoning her family's behaviour towards her, she explains that in her teens she had eloped with a white man. She eventually falls for him and proposes him while counting him the perks of marrying including nationality. He agrees and they both get engaged. Danize comes to Mujtaba for apologising her past behaviour but he doesn't believe her. Mujtaba's uncle scolds Shamraiz for dictating Mujtaba in the office, creating hate in Shamraiz' heart for Mujtaba. He asks Danize to help him to plot against him so that he should be thrown back to Pakistan. She denies as she wants to mend her terms with Mujtaba. She finally does it when Kiran pushes Mujtaba to forgive her. Danize asks Mujtaba to reshift to their house to which he agrees.

Danize' mother, Safina asks Shamraiz about his love for Daniez to which he replies affirmatively. But before his proposal, Daniez shares him that she begins to love Mujtaba. Shamraiz finds it insulting that she has chosen Mujtaba over him as her life partner. He plots against Mujtaba by sending him at midnight in Daniez' room to tarnish his image for Daniez' parents. However, Daniez' confesses her love for Mujtaba and tells his parents to marry him. After taking some time, Mujtaba decides and marries her. During their wedding ceremony, Kiran arrives and gets heartbreak on learning about Mujtaba's marriage. She slaps him and they both argue. Taimoor tells Mujtaba not to pain her daughter otherwise he will take him to the court. He also asks him to shift to some other place with his wife for the sake of his self-respect, leading to Mujtaba and Daniez to move to a studio apartment. Kiran's family taunts her for the failure of her relationship and she eventually leaves her house. The disappointed Mujtaba gets nothing after marrying Daniez for which he has dreamed. Mujtaba comes across Kiran and asks for forgiveness for his behaviour. She forgives him and suggests to restart as friends. Shamraiz tries to create a bad image of Danize and Mujtaba's marital life but fails. Kiran begins to keep an eye on Mujtaba's marital life to make him pass through the same situation from which she had. Shamraiz gets a clue about her intentions when finds her revolving around Mujtaba's house and with him. He decides to team up with her to ruin the marital life of Danieze and Mujtaba. He buys an apartment for Kiran near Danize and Mujtaba's apartment so that they can keep an eye on them and spoil them eventually. They succeed in doing so when Shamraiz takes Danize for a dinner with the help of Safina and manipulates Daniez to not to discuss this with Mujtaba but tells him himself in her absence, creating a rift between Mujtaba and Danize. They argue there and she asks him to leave the apartment. He does so and goes to a restaurant where Kiran comes to him and consoles him, according to her and Shamraiz' plan. Shamraiz then brings Danize there leading to intensity their misunderstanding, even to the extent that Danize returns to her parents' house and decides to divorce him. In the meantime, Kiran and Shamraiz fall for each other. After separating them, Kiran leaves Shamraiz' apartment and shifts to Mujtaba's apartment when he learns that she has a no place to live. Danize eventually comes there to clear the conflict but leaves instantly finding that he is sharing the apartment with Kiran. Danize decides not to divorce him until he gets the nationality and also sends him some money. Considering it against his self-respect, Mujtaba returns the money to her through Kiran and decides to return to Pakistan. In Danize' house, while returning the money Kiran clears the misunderstandings regarding her relationship with Mujtaba and urges Danize to stop him to leave for Pakistan. Danize goes after him and they both reconcile there. Danize suspects that Kiran is interested in Shamraiz and asks Mujtaba to call her. Kiran meets them and tells them that she was behind their dispute. Mujtaba gets anger on her as he had considered her as her best friend ever but soon leaves her. Mujtaba and Danieze meet Shamraiz and tell him about Kiran and tease him after realising his love for Kiran. Dnaize provides him her address and he confesses his love for her after meeting her.

== Cast ==
=== Main cast ===
- Fawad Khan as Mujtaba
- Sanam Baloch as Kiran
- Ayesha Khan as Danize Taimoor
- Mikaal Zulfiqar as Shamraiz

=== Other cast members ===
- Azra Mohyeddin as Mujtaba's mother
- Hashim Butt as Mujtaba's father
- Laila Zuberi as Safina
- Naeem Tahir as Taimoor
- Rida Asfahani as Nabeela: Mujtaba's sister
- Mujtaba Khan as Mujtaba's brother
- Fawad Jalal as Shoaib: Kiran's brother
- Farah Tufail as Kiran's sister-in-law
- Tasneem Kausar as Kiran's mother
- Sana Humayun as Kiran: Mujtaba's colleague
- Jahazeb Khan as Umer: Mujtaba's friend and colleague
- Khalid Butt as Mr. Singh: Shamraiz' uncle
- Mahira Bhatti as Tanya
- Tashiqa Shah as Tanya's mother

== Soundtrack ==
The official sound track of the drama serial has been composed by Waqar Ali and the lyrics were written by Sabir Zafar. The title song "Kuch Pyar Ka Pagalpan Bhi Tha" has been sung by Rahat Fateh Ali Khan

== Production ==
The principal photography for the series took place in Turkey.
