= Pardes (2015 TV series) =

2015 Pakistani television drama series

- پردیس
- Genre: Drama
- Written by: K Rahman
- Directed by: Sabir Waheed
- Starring: Sarwat Gillani; Faisal Rehman; Juggan Kazim; Taifoor Khan; Erum Akhtar; Sehar Afzal; Imran Ashraf; Sohail Sameer; Irfan Khoosat
- Country of origin: Pakistan
- Original language: Urdu
- No. of episodes: 10

Original release
- Network: Hum Sitaray
- Release: 28 October 2015 – 6 January 2016

Pardes (Urdu: پردیس, lit. 'Foreign Land') is a Pakistani television drama series written by K Rahman and directed by Sabir Waheed. It aired on Hum Sitaray from 28 October 2015 to 6 January 2016, comprising ten episodes. The series stars Sarwat Gillani, Faisal Rehman, Juggan Kazim, Taifoor Khan, Erum Akhtar, and Sehar Afzal in leading roles. The narrative is set partly in Lahore and partly in Phuket, Thailand.

== Plot ==
Two brothers live together with their families in Lahore. When their children are to be married, the elder brother's son Kabeer refuses to wed the daughter of his uncle Mubashir and leaves the country. He travels to Phuket to be with Sonia, a woman he met online. Sonia lives with her mother and works in the household of a wealthy businessman, Makhdoom Shah Zaman, as a carer for Zaman's wife Geati, who has a mental health condition.

== Cast ==
- Sarwat Gillani as Geati
- Faisal Rehman as Makhdoom Shah Zaman
- Juggan Kazim as Sanam
- Taifoor Khan as Kabeer
- Sehar Afzal as Sonia
- Erum Akhtar as Shaheen
- Imran Ashraf as Jawad
- Sohail Sameer as Zaheer
- Irfan Khoosat as Kabeer and Zaheer's father
- Mohsin Gillani as Mubashir
- Munazzah Arif as Fariha
- Seemi Raheel as Sonia's mother
- Kinza Malik as Arslan's mother
- Tehreem Afzal as Sobia
