= Shabbir Jan =

Pakistani actor

- شبیر جان
- Born: 19 April 1960 (age 66); Karachi, Pakistan
- Occupation: Actor
- Years active: 1987–Present
- Spouse: Javeria Shabbir - first wife Fareeda Shabbir - second wife
- Awards: Pride of Performance Award by the President of Pakistan (2019)

Shabbir Jan (Urdu: شبیر جان) is a Pakistani actor who has appeared in many TV drama serials, such as Jangloos (1989), Makan (2006) and Zindagi Dhoop Tum Ghana Saya (2011).

== Career ==
Shabbir Jan started working as a TV actor in the 1980s. He has won the PTV Best Actor award three times. He was a nominee for the Best Actor award in the Lux Style Awards in 2010.

== Personal life ==
In a 2024 interview with Sajid Hasan, Shabbir Jan revealed that he married for the first time at the age of 18 with his cousin, with whom he has six children. Later, after entering the entertainment industry, he decided to tie the knot for a second time with fellow actress Fareeda Shabbir, marrying her in 2001. They have two children, a son and a daughter, Yashmeera, who made her acting debut in 2022.

== Filmography ==
=== Television serials ===
Year	Title	Role	Channel
1987	Ghar Rama	Khawar	PTV
1988	Flight 033	Roshan	PTV
1989	Jangloos	Raheem Dad	PTV
1990	Do Dooni Panch	Nadeem	PTV
1991	Gurez	Junaid	PTV
1992	Raat, Rait, Hawa	Noman	PTV
1993	Kashkol	Jameel Ustad	NTM
1993	Nangay Paon	Nazar	PTV
1993	Zarb Taqseem	Akhtar	PTV
1993	Babar	Babur	PTV
1994	Aitraf	Waseem	PTV
1994	Thori Si Zindagi	Salman	PTV
1995	Mandi	Ghulam Qadir	PTV
1995	Karb	Jamal	PTV
1996	Ilzam	Mehmood Asif	STN
1997	Haye Jaidi	Sohail	PTV
1999	Manoos Ajnabi	Nasir	PTV
1999	Pindar	Sajid	PTV
2000	Ibn e Adam	Temoor	PTV
2000	Zanjeer	Inspector Jamal	PTV
2000	Aur Zindagi Badalti Hai	Bash	PTV
2001	Game	Ali	PTV
2001	Adha Chehra		PTV
2002	Khataa		PTV
2003	Aanchal	Azeem	PTV
2004	Masuri		PTV
2006	Barson Baad	Rafeeq	PTV
2006	Makan		Geo TV
2007	Sharbati		PTV Home
2007	Lyari Express		PTV Home
2008	Bint e Adam		PTV Home
2008	Mehman	Raju	ARY TV
2008	Chaar Chand		Geo TV
2009	Baarh	Mustafa	PTV Home
2009	Gardish		ARY Digital
2009	Kahe Ko Biyahi Badais		Geo Entertainment
2010	Barish Kay Aansoo		Geo TV
2010	Dil Hai Chota Sa		Geo TV
2011	Saat Rang Kay Sapnay		PTV Home
2011	Zindagi Dhoop Tum Ghana Saya		ARY Digital
2011	Kafir	Syed Umar Shah	ARY Digital
2011	Dil Tou Kachha Hai Jee		ARY Digital
2011	Ahmed Habib Ki Betiyan	Ahmed Habib	Hum TV
2013	Chubhan		Hum TV
2014	Mithu Aur Aapa	Mustaqeem	Hum TV
2014	Kissey Apna Kahein	Hashim	Hum TV
2014	Babul Ki Saheliyan	Babul	Hum Sitaray
2014	Kharaash		PTV Home
2014	Devraniyaan		Geo Kahani
2014	Dhoom Dharakka	Shabbir Sahab	ARY Digital
2014	Rangbaaz		Express Entertainment
2015	Love Mein Twist		PTV Home
2015	Bint-E-Hawa		PTV Home
2015	Dil Ishq		Geo Entertainment
2015	Khatoon Manzil		ARY Digital
2016	Hum Sab Ajeeb Se Hain		Aaj
2016	Seeta Bagri		TVOne
2016	Bahu Raniyan		Express Entertainment
2016	Haya Kay Rang		ARY Zindagi
2016	Manjdhaar		Geo Entertainment
2017	Rasmein		PTV Home
2017	Zakham	Tehreem	ARY Digital
2018	Hasna Mana Hai		BOL
2018	Banglay Main Kanglay		BOL
2018	Aik Mohabbat Kaafi Hai		BOL
2018	Ajnabi Shehar Kay Ajnabi Raastay		TVOne
2018	Jalebi		ARY Digital
2019	Mera Qasoor		ARY Digital
2019	Cheekh	Advocate Aaqilzada	ARY Digital
2019	Jaal	Arshad Ahmed	Hum TV
2019	Bhai Bhai		Express TV
2019	Meri Shadi Karwao		Play Entertainment
2019	Ramz-e-Ishq		Geo TV
2020	Ishqiya	Awais Siddique	ARY Digital
2021	Qayamat		Geo TV
2021	Pehli Si Muhabbat	Faizullah	ARY Digital
2021	Mujhe Wida Kar	Habib	ARY Digital
2021	Juda Huay Kuch Is Tarha	Tariq	Hum TV
2021	Dobaara	Jehangir	Hum TV
2021	Dil-e-Momin	Jameel	Geo Entertainment
2021	Aey Musht-E-Khaak	Imaam Saab	Geo Entertainment
2021	Bechari Qudsia	Rasheed	Geo Entertainment
2022	Dil Bhatkay		TVOne
2022	Chauraha	Qadeer	Geo Entertainment
2022	Inteqam	Zaheer	Geo Entertainment
2022	Jo Na Mil Sakay		Aaj Entertainment
2022	Meri Hai Kiya Khata		Aan TV
2023	Ishq Murshid	Aftab	Hum TV
2023	Baylagaam	Sajid	Geo TV
2024	Burns Road Kay Romeo Juliet	Farhad's father	ARY Digital
2024	Aye Ishq e Junoon	Mir Zulfiqar	ARY Digital

=== Telefilms ===
Year	Title	Role	Channel
1996	Farar	Ali	PTV
1998	Ghazi Shaheed	Commander Zafar Khan	PTV Home
2011	Shakoor Sahab		Geo TV
2015	Shabana Baji		ARY Digital
2017	Khalida or Walida	Khalida's husband	ARY Digital
2018	Dil Pe Mat Le Yaar		ARY Digital
2019	Dil To Bacha Hai		ARY Digital
2022	Aik Anaar Do Beemar	Professor Baqi	ARY Digital

=== Films ===
Key
†	denotes film / drama that has not been released yet
†	Denotes films / drama that are currently on cinema / on air

Year	Films	Notes
2014	Sultanat	
2018	The Donkey King	Geo Films
2022	Ishrat Made in China	
TBA	Zeher-e-Ishq†	TBA

== Awards and nominations ==
- Pride of Performance Award by the President of Pakistan in 2019.

Year	Ceremony	Category	Project	Result	Note
2002	1st Lux Style Awards	Best TV Actor	N/A	Nominated	
2008	7th Lux Style Awards	Best TV Actor (Terrestrial)	Lyari Express	Nominated	
2010	9th Lux Style Awards	Best TV Actor (Satellite)	Andata	Nominated	
