= Farah Tufail =

Pakistani television actress and RJ

- Born: Lahore, Punjab, Pakistan
- Occupation: Actress
- Years active: 1998–present

Farah Tufail is a Pakistani television actress and RJ. She started her career during the 2000s. Tufail received Hum Award for Best Actress for her portrayal of Tehreem in telefilm Tehreem. Her television appearances include a number of notable projects like Udeek (1998), Hum Tum Aur Woh (2002), Dil Ki Batain (2008), Thakan (2012), Teri Raah Main Rul Gai (2012), Kuch Pyar Ka Pagalpan (2014), Kaneez (2015), Baaghi (2017), Pinjra (2017), Ghughi (2018), Aakhri Station (2018), Hoor Pari (2019).

== Television ==
Year	Title	Role	Network	Additional Notes
1998	Udeek	Sarwat	PTV Home	
1999	Aahlna	Rano	PTV Home	
2000	Us Paar		PTV Home	
2000	Dopatta	Bindia	PTV Home	
2000	Sahib Sarkar		PTV Home	
2002	Hum Tum Aur Woh	Sofia	PTV Home	
2002	Shahla Kot	Razia		
2010	Dastaan	Sikh villager	Hum TV	Cameo
2011	Kuch Pyar Ka Pagalpan		ARY Digital	
2011	Tehreem	Tehreem	Hum TV	Telefilm, Hum Award for Best Actress
2012	Thakan	Deeba	ARY Digital	
2012	Teri Raah Main Rul Gai	Husna	ARY Digital	
2013	Sannata		ARY Digital	
2013	Ghundi	Nargis	Hum Sitaray	
2017	Baaghi	Fauzia's sister	Urdu 1	
2017	Pinjra		A-Plus TV	
2017	Mujhay Jeenay Do		Urdu 1	
2018	Kahan Ho Tum	Murad Ali Khan's wife	A-Plus TV	
2018	Ghughi	Inayat Bibi	TV One	
2018	Aakhri Station	Rafiya	ARY Digital	
2019	Hoor Pari	Rukaiyya	A-Plus TV	
2020	Dushman e Jaan	Rukhsana	ARY Digital	
