= Daniel K. Winn =

American painter (born 1966)

Daniel K Winn
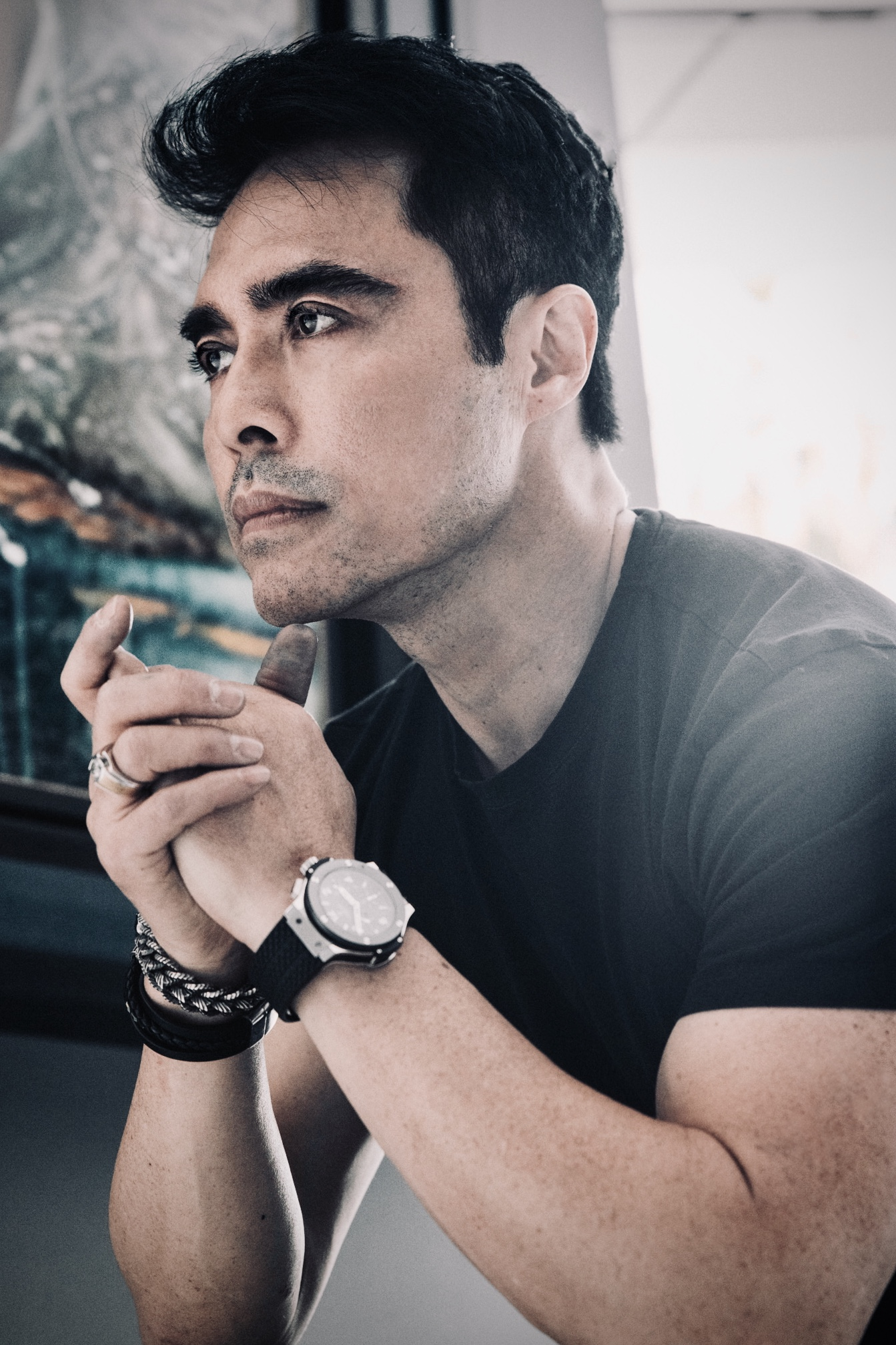
- Born: Daniel K Winn; June 19, 1966 (age 60); Biên Hòa, Vietnam
- Education: University of California, Irvine
- Known for: Painting, Sculpture

Daniel K. Winn (born June 19, 1966) is a Vietnamese-American artist, curator, and philanthropist.

== Early life and education ==
Winn was born in Biên Hoa, Vietnam and lived there until 1975 when his family escaped to California, during the Fall of Saigon to escape Vietnamese communism. His family settled in Greater Los Angeles where Winn eventually attended the University of California, Irvine, earning a Bachelors of Science. Winn then began medical school at the University of California, Irvine, School of Medicine with an intended focus in reconstructive surgery but left before receiving a degree to pursue a career in art.

== Career as curator and artist ==
After leaving medical school, Winn began producing paintings and sculptures and opened a small frame shop and gallery in Southern California. By 1997, Winn owned galleries in Newport Beach and Laguna Beach. That same year he founded Masterpiece Publishing and spent the next 20 years mentoring and promoting artists, curating exhibitions throughout North America and China. During this time, Winn continued to refine his own style. Winn's sculptures and paintings have been exhibited in the United States, Spain, China, and Vietnam.

In 2019, the Shanghai Art Museum held a joint exhibit featuring the works of Winn and Dalí.

Winn has raised over $2 million for charities in the US and Asia. In 2018, Winn was knighted by Prince Waldemar of Schaumburg-Lippe in recognition of his philanthropic works.

In 2021, Winn was commissioned to create five new award statuettes for the Asian World Film Festival including the new Snow Leopard Award, the Red Cross Tiffany Ladies Circle Courage to Dream Award, the Benefactor Award, the Winn-Slavin Humanitarian Award, and the One Heart Award.

On April 22, 2023, Winn was featured on the Golden Globes Awards website with a story entitled "Sir Daniel Winn: A Tough Life from Vietnam to America and Success in Art and Film," which tells the story about Winn's rise to fame from poverty.

== Exhibitions ==
- Art Miami-Context 2021
- Red Dot Miami, 2016
- La Art Show, 2017
- Art Marbella, 2017
- Shanghai Contemporary Art Fair, 2017
- Jane Kahan Gallery, 2017
- Intersect Palm Springs, 2017
- Coral Spring Museum of Art, 2018
- Shanghai Art Museum, 2019, 2020

== Awards ==
- 2009 Asian Business Association of Orange County Entrepreneur of the Year
- 2014 California Senate Resolution Recipient as a Publisher for Contemporary Arts
- 2019 International Gold Medal, Best Sculpture. Grand Jury de Mondial Art Academia.
- 2020 International Gold Medal, Best Painting. Grand Jury de Mondial Art Academia.
- 2020 International Silver Medal, Best Sculpture. Grand Jury de Mondial Art Academia.
