= Haroon Tou Piya Teri =

2009 Pakistani television series

- Written by: Faiza Iftikhar
- Directed by: S. Mazhar Moin
- Starring: Ayesha Khan; Sami Khan
- Theme music composer: Farrukh Abid; Shoaib Farrukh
- Opening theme: Maha Lakshmi
- Country of origin: Pakistan
- Original language: Urdu
- No. of episodes: 30

Production
- Executive producer: Seema Taher Khan
- Producer: Gulzaib Nawaz Jajja

Original release
- Network: TV One Pakistan
- Release: 27 July 2009 – 2009

Haroon Tou Piya Teri is a Pakistani television serial, written by Faiza Iftikhar, based on her novel "Daasi Dhollan Yaar Di". It was directed by S.Mazhar Moin and Seema Taher Khan was the executive producer. It stars Ayesha Khan and Sami Khan as leads, with Shahood Alvi, Adnan Shah Tipu, Badar Khalil and Savera Pasha in pivotal roles. It aired on TV One in 2009. It had a re-telecast on the network with the title "Khelo Pyar Ki Bazi".

== Plot ==
Sagheer Ahmed's family comprises his wife Haleema, their daughter Nimmo, his mother Jahan Aara, his brother-in-law Talli, and his two mothers-in-law Jannat and Zubeida. Talli does nothing at all and often disappears from days to weeks. One day, when he returns, he brings a girl with him and introduces her as Gul, his wife. It shocks the family as Talli has ordinary physical features and no source of income while in contrast Gul appears young and beautiful. She tells them that her stepmother was going to marry her to a ruffian guy in exchange for money, so to save herself she married Talli, who had often come near her house.

Jahan Aara readily accepts her as the daughter-in-law of the family after getting impressed by her interest in the household work. Janant however doesn't do so. On a rainy night, a man, Yasir, arrives in the house and Gul introduces him as her cousin. She tells them that she has informed Yasir about her difficult time through a letter to Kuwait, and now he has arrived for her well-being. Sagheer welcomes him and asks him to stay. Gul and Yasir were actually in love with each other, and she sent him to Kuwait so that he can earn money there. Talli and Gul's marriage shocks Yasir as she has not mentioned about her marriage in the letter. Every night, when Talli calls Gul she refuses him and offers him a drink after which he sleeps peacefully for a long time. Gul and Talli's unwanted and by chance interactions disturbs Yasir but Gul clears his doubt. One day, when Gul vomits, the family members suspect that she is pregnant. But she explains that she has just eaten a rotten samosa last night. Yasir is frustrated over this scenario and inquiries about their relationship status. She assures her love for him stating that they are not even married. She reveals that she had just prepared a fake nikkahnama and took Talli's signatures on them taking advantage of his innocence. But Yasir's doubts don't clear as he finds it unbearable that she is sharing the room with a person without any relationship. Sagheer, who spends his most of time with Yasir, advises him to start his new business with him. Gul asks Yasir to elope as she is not married, but he rejects the idea due to having no place to live and his new business that he has just started with Sagheer. Jahan Aara finds Yasir a suitable match for Nimmo and shares this with Sagheer. Gul takes the sympathies of the family members after Talli beats her manipulation. In her next meeting with Yasir, he asks her to seemingly divorce Talli so that they can move further. Gul takes it as a challenge and agrees to fulfill it within four days. At that night, she asks Talli to go far away as the family considers him abnormal. Talli, already disturbed by drug addiction, eventually hangs himself. The family is devastated over his death. In the night, Yasir and Gul meet and Yasir blames Gul for his death. He doesn't believe her and further tells her that he wants a morale wife which she is not, and Nimmo is, for which she has agreed to Sagheer.

During a morning, after Jannat and Zubeida's previous heated argument, Jannat tries to wake up Zubeida and discovers that she is dead. Yasir shifts to an apartment after his marriage is fixed with Nimmo. Gul goes there to confront him, but he just blames her and tells her that he doesn't love her anymore. Sagheer and Jahan Aara discuss Nimmo and Yasir's wedding, and Sagheer informs that he is going to marry Gul as she has no support. Jahan Aara opposes his decision initially but later she realizes that the decision was right. The preparations of Nimmo's wedding begin and Sagheer hands over all the responsibilities to Gul. When Yasir learns about Gul and Sagheer's marriage, he suspects it as another plan of Gul, but she denies. When he questions about her love for him which she had used to repeat in the past every time, she assures her love for him and further clarified that she has married just to prove Yasir wrong as he had told her that no respectable man would marry her ever. Yasir is stunned that she has taken such a bold step just to prove him wrong.

Nimmo's former friend, Chhanno, with whom Nimmo has broken her friendship, gets trapped in a vicious cycle. Her boyfriend, Sajid, who has her private videos and photos, compels her to go with other men in exchange for money. She finally finds a way to become free from it, making a deal with Sajid that she will not blackmail her again if she provides her a replacement. Nimmo and Gul go for the former's wedding shopping one day. Chhanno learns about this and informs Sajid who kidnaps Nimmo. Gul, who was in another shop, in shocked when she learns about it.

At home, Haleema and Jannat blame Gul for Nimmo's disappearance. Yasir also blames her initially but later presents an offer to her that if she brings Nimmo back, he will present himself to her. Gul thinks about the matter and after connecting the dots she realizes that Chhanno had once mentioned that she is looking for a replacement and she was also not her friend anymore. She goes to Chhanno's home finding that she was going somewhere. Gul makes her understand that it's not the way as she could get caught in big trouble like kidnapping case, after which she tells her everything. Gul brings Nimmo back and everyone questions where she was. Gul speaks lies there that she has made her disappear as she secretly loves Yasir and doesn't want them to marry. Sagheer slaps her and orders her to leave the house. Jahan Aara realizes that she committed a mistake in assessing Gul. Before leaving, Yasir asks her why she lied about her kidnapping as after her return he was going to present himself to her as per the deal. She states she needs her love not his physical existence just.

Seven years pass after Yasir and Nimmo's marriage, and they shift to Lahore. Due to Yasir's business, they keep changing their city after some time. In every city where they live, Yasir brings all the women clad with black shawl over their head, just as Gul had, in his house and offers them food. Nimmo keeps on complaining to him that he doesn't allow their relationship to develop and he himself is fulfilling this relationship by compulsion. At a night, Nimmo becomes ready and asks her to dinner. There she asks her lightly whether she is a good housewife. He slaps her and she goes away from there. He feels restless while remembering Gul and her love. He finally decides something on seeing a piece of broken glass. Nimmo comes to him and finds that he has suicided.

== Cast ==
- Ayesha Khan as Gul
- Sami Khan as Yasir
- Shahood Alvi as Sagheer Ahmed
- Adnan Shah Tipu as Talat "Talli" Munir
- Nazli Nasr as Haleema
- Badar Khalil as Jahan Aara
- Savera Pasha as Narmeen "Nimmo"
- Shehnaz Pervaiz as Jannat
- Salma Zafar as Zubeida
- Kanwal Nazeer as Chhanno
- Rehana Kaleem as Rajjo
- Hassan Niazi as Sajid
- Zaheen Tahira as Shah Bibi
- Atif Rathore as Yasir's friend

== Production ==
Haroon Tou Piya Teri was based on novelist Faiza Iftikhar's novel "Daasi Dhollan Yaar Di", and she also wrote the screenplay, marking the first script that she wrote. The production of the serial however took time leading to other projects of Iftikhar to broadcast earlier. Ayesha Khan and Sami Khan played the leads in the serial, and after this project they later appeared in Bol Meri Machli as well.

== Awards ==
Year	Award	Category	Recipient	Result	Ref(s).
2010	Pakistan Media Awards	Best Drama Actress	Ayesha Khan	Won	
