= Ranjha Ranjha Kardi =

2018 Pakistani drama serial

- Urdu: رانجھا رانجھا کردی
- Genre: Social; Family drama; Romantic drama
- Written by: Faiza Iftikhar
- Directed by: Kashif Nisar
- Starring: Iqra Aziz; Imran Ashraf; Syed Jibran; Asma Abbas; Kashif Mehmood
- Theme music composer: Sami Khan
- Country of origin: Pakistan
- Original language: Urdu
- No. of episodes: 31

Production
- Producer: Momina Duraid
- Production companies: MD Productions; SBCH Productions

Original release
- Network: Hum TV
- Release: 3 November 2018 – 1 June 2019

Ranjha Ranjha Kardi (lit. 'While repeating her beloved's name') is a 2018 Pakistani drama serial that aired on Hum TV. It is directed by Kashif Nisar and written by Faiza Iftikhar, starring Iqra Aziz, Imran Ashraf and Syed Jibran. It emerged as one of the most iconic dramas in Pakistan television history. The serial is produced by Momina Duraid under their banner MD Productions in collaboration with SBCH Productions.

== Plot ==
The drama serial revolves around Noori, a young woman from a poor background. Her parents live by picking garbage from streets, therefore she is uncomfortable with the environment around her. She rejects her parents' lifestyle and wishes for a better and respectable life. To fulfill this wish of hers, she moves to a city and starts a respectable living by working in a factory. In this journey, she learns of Sahir and Bhola. Sahir is a greedy young man, who works in a shop and wishes for a better future; whereas, mentally weak and childlike Bhola owns a mansion and agricultural land in a village, (which his paternal uncle, Nusrat Chacha, takes care of). Bhola is loved deeply by his mother, Fehmida. Sahir and Bhola both get attached to Noor Bano's life, one which is by total deceit and the other is an ordeal.

Sahir is not serious about Noori, but she is always daydreaming about her marriage with Sahir. Noori somehow convinces him to marry her, to which he nonchalantly agrees. One day, when Noori comes to visit Sahir, she sees that there is some investigation going on and becomes worried when Sahir is found guilty of stealing money from the shop he works in. The police demanded ransom for Sahir's release and Noori is thinking of the ways she could get the money. When Noori asks her baji for money, she refuses and her husband also sexually harasses Noori by offering her money to be with him. Noori confronts the factory owner and says she does not want his money and quits working at the factory.

She steals her Baji's jewelry to pay for Sahir's release. Afterward, Sahir gets released, whereas Noori is jailed for stealing the jewellery. Noori's father makes a deal with Shokha, an aged smuggler, to free his daughter and marry her. On the other hand, Noori threatens her former boss to either take back the case or she will expose him. The Haji (former boss) does it and Noori is free. However, she still has to get rid of Shokha, so she runs away and goes to Sahir, who is arranging to leave the city. Sahir refuses to marry her, (as he was not sincere with his intentions), saying that she had spent a night in the lock-up and who knows if any lustful policeman had disgraced her. Noori, heartbroken, returns to her mentor, Amma Jannate's house. She asks Amma Jannate to help her because she does not want to marry Shokha and is considering suicide. Amma Jannate tells her the only way out is to wed, which will also fulfill her desire of living a respectable life.

The person Amma Jannate is talking about is actually Bhola, but Noori is not aware of it until after her marriage. Has all this happened to her for good and a better future? Initially, Noori can not stand him, even feeling for Bhola. She then realizes that Sahir is a Cunning and Deceitful greedy man and she would not want anyone else to have him as a life partner so in an attempt to break Komal and Sahir's alliance, she exposes him to everyone and succeeds. It is revealed that 23 years before Bhola's mother made a wish at the Mazaar that she will sacrifice him and give him to a Peer. And it was her belief that if you aren't having any children but as soon as you have your first child and you leave it at the Mazaar you will have many more, but her heart doesn't listen and she doesn't leave him at the Mazaar and then she never had any other children and Bhola became mentally ill and her husband died. She misunderstands the situation as the Peer being angry and that is the cause of the whole problem and says that if Bhola and Noori have any children she will leave the first one at the Mazaar but her daughter-in-law Noori explains to her that this can happen to anyone and we should not associate partners with Allah (God) and that if you have a child that is because of God and not a Peer at a Mazaar and that she is doing Shirk. Noori tries to get away from Bhola, but later she develops love, care, and empathy for him, due to his innocence and pure love for her. This intense story develops from there, and so does Noori and Bhola's unconventional romantic relationship. It ends with Bhola's mental condition becoming mostly fine and then she has a baby boy whom Bhola refuses to meet as he is afraid of him being like Bhola, but when Noori convinces him to see his baby, he kisses him on the forehead and starts to cry.

== Cast ==
- Iqra Aziz as Noor Bano "Noori"
- Imran Ashraf as Mohiuddin "Bhola"
- Asma Abbas as Fehmida; Bhola's mother
- Syed Jibran as Sahir
- Ammara Butt as Komal; Bhola's cousin
- Kashif Mehmood as Nusrat Mian; Bhola's uncle
- Munazzah Arif as Rizwana; Bhola's aunt
- Zaib Rehman as Amma Jannate; Noori's mentor
- Ismat Iqbal as Noori's mother
- Faiz Chauhan as Nazeer; Noori's father
- Noor ul Hassan as Shokha
- Ahmed Abdul Rehman as Mumtaz Begum
- Umer Darr as Darr; Bhola's friend
- Zaryab Haider as Shafiq; Bhola's friend
- Haseeb Muhammad Bin Qasim as Haji Sahab; Noori's employer
- Aisha Khan as Qudsia Begum; Haji Sahab's wife
- Momina Aayla as Young Noori
- Shabana Bhatti as Shakoorun

== Themes ==
The series shed light on various societal issues like marital rape.

== Production ==
Imran Ashraf was selected to portray the lead role of a mentally challenged person Bhola, while talking to The News International he shared that, for the preparation of the role, he observed and studied such people and their body language. Alongside Ashraf, Iqra Aziz was chosen to portray the female lead of Noori which was previously rejected by Zara Noor Abbas.

== International broadcast ==
The series aired in India on Zindagi, started from December 2022.

== Reception ==
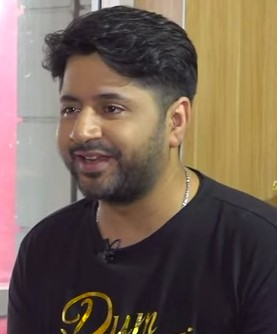
Imran Ashraf's performance received critical acclaim, and he was awarded the Lux Style Award for Best TV Actor (Viewer's choice)

The show's first episode has over 10 million views on YouTube and the TRPs of the show several times were the highest for the timeslot. The drama and its story has gained critical acclaim for various things; Imran Ashraf's performance as Bhola, Iqra Aziz's performance as Noori, Asma Abbas's performance as Amma Jee, dealing with hidden social issues, such as awareness about mentally challenged people, wrong perceptions of society on castes and social status, misinterpretation of Islam and made up religious practices, and messages on sensitive issues.

== Soundtrack ==
Ranjha Ranjha Kardi - OST

Soundtrack album by Rahma Ali Muqaddraan / Saania
- Released: 26 October 2018
- Recorded: 2018
- Genre: Television soundtrack
- Length: (4:50)
- Languages: Urdu, Punjabi
- Label: Hum TV

Music video
- "Ranjha Ranjha Kardi" OST on YouTube

== Awards and nominations ==
Date of ceremony	Award	Category	Recipient(s) and nominee(s)	Result	Ref.
February 07, 2020	Pakistan International Screen Awards	Best Television Play	Momina Duraid	Nominated	
February 07, 2020	Pakistan International Screen Awards	Best Television Director	Kashif Nisar	Nominated	
February 07, 2020	Pakistan International Screen Awards	Best Television Actor	Imran Ashraf	Nominated	
February 07, 2020	Pakistan International Screen Awards	Best Television Actor - Critics choice	Imran Ashraf	Nominated	
February 07, 2020	Pakistan International Screen Awards	Best Television Actress - Critic's choice	Iqra Aziz	Nominated	
February 07, 2020	Pakistan International Screen Awards	Best Television Writer	Faiza Iftikhar	Nominated	
December 31, 2020	Lux Style Awards	Best TV Play	Momina Duraid	Nominated	
December 31, 2020	Lux Style Awards	Best TV Director	Kashif Nisar	Won	
December 31, 2020	Lux Style Awards	Best TV Actor	Imran Ashraf	Won	
December 31, 2020	Lux Style Awards	Best TV Actor - Critic's Choice	Imran Ashraf	Nominated	
December 31, 2020	Lux Style Awards	Best TV Actress	Iqra Aziz	Nominated	
December 31, 2020	Lux Style Awards	Best TV Actress - Critic's Choice	Iqra Aziz	Won	
December 31, 2020	Lux Style Awards	Best TV Writer	Faiza Iftikhar	Won	
December 31, 2020	Lux Style Awards	Best Original Soundtrack	JB Sisters and Rahma Ali	Won	
