= Zindagi Dhoop Tum Ghana Saya =

2011 Pakistani television series

- Title screen
- Genre: Romance; Social drama
- Written by: Faiza Iftikhar
- Directed by: Syed Atif Hussain
- Starring: Sanam Baloch; Shabbir Jan; Fahad Mustafa
- Opening theme: Zindagi Dhoop Tum Ghana Saya by Rahat Fateh Ali Khan
- Country of origin: Pakistan
- Original language: Urdu

Production
- Producers: Humayun Saeed; Abdullah Kadwani; Asad Qureshi
- Production company: 7th Sky Entertainment

Original release
- Network: ARY Digital
- Release: 19 February – 17 June 2011

Zindagi Dhoop Tum Ghana Saya (Urdu: زندگی دھوپ تم گھنا سایہ, lit. 'Life is sunlight, you are a dense shade') is a Pakistani drama television series which premiered on ARY Digital on 19 February 2011. The serial was televised every Saturday at 8:00 p.m. (PST). The serial is directed by Syed Atif Hussain, written by Faiza Iftikhar, and produced by Humayun Saeed and Abdullah Kadwani's production house 7th Sky Entertainment. The serial is about the tragic events that a young woman faces after she is widowed suddenly.

The show was also aired on SET UK.

== Plot ==
Hira hails from a middle-class background and loses her parents when she was just a child. She marries Mazhar, who belongs to a very wealthy family and proves to be a loving and devoted husband. Although Mazhar's family makes her life difficult, his love makes her life beautiful. On the second anniversary of their marriage, Mazhar dies in a car accident, making Hira's life difficult once again. Mazhar's sister, Rizwana, wants to gain power and control over her brother's house. However, she cannot completely achieve her goal because of Mazhar's share and the inheritance rights of his son, Ahmer. Rizwana poisons her mother's minds against Hira, and soon Hira is thrown out of the house by her mother-in-law in order to protect her from Rizwana's conspiracies.

Hira goes to her brother Kamal's house, where he advises her to file a case against Rizwana to secure Ahmer's rightful share. Hira follows his advice, and two years pass. When Rizwana senses that she may lose the case, she reconciles with Hira, brings her back into the house, and assures her that Ahmer will receive his rightful share. However, Hira cannot stay there for long after discovering that Rizwana's reconciliation was merely a trap. Rizwana's intention was to manipulate the situation to make Hira look immoral so that she would eventually give up her claim to Ahmer's share. Revealing the plot, Hira leaves the house.

Her younger brother, Jamal, who has just returned from Germany with his wife, Anum, brings Hira and Ahmer to his home. Jamal and Anum initially treat them with great care and affection. However, when Anum's brother, Feroze, meets Hira and wishes to marry her, Anum's behavior changes completely. She refuses to let her brother marry a widow. Hira's elder sister-in-law, Kulsoom, and Anum then try to find a suitable match for her because they become concerned about her sadness and loneliness in her brothers' home. Eventually, Hira marries Naveed Murad, a widower who marries her mainly so that she can give his daughter the love and affection of a mother.

After her marriage, Hira has to endure the bitter words and harsh treatment of her mother-in-law, Shamshad. Three years pass, but Hira and Naveed's relationship does not develop into a true marital bond, as Hira remains emotionally distant and continues to remember her late husband, Mazhar. She however provides great affection to his daughter, Vashma, and her sincerity to him. She faces problems because of Ahmer’s stubborn behavior and her sadness for remembering Mazhar. One day, Hira goes to Kamal’s house, and Vashma falls ill back in the house. Naveed tries to inform Hira, but Ahmer does not deliver his message. Hira learns about Vashma’s illness later and immediately rushes there. Naveed and his mother are furious with Ahmer for what he has done. Consequently, Naveed asks Hira to send Ahmer to her brother’s house permanently. Unwantedly, Hira distances him from herself with great courage, but she does not protest about it from Naveed. She wants Naveed to realize his mistake without saying anything to him.

Rizwana becomes pregnant several times but is unable to have children due to complications. Her husband advises her to rectify the wrongs she has committed against Hira and to give Hira’s son his rightful share. Rizwana agrees, but her intentions are mainly to mend her ways and adapt Ahmer. She takes Ahmer from Kamal through legal proceedings, gives him some money, and brings him to her house.

Six months pass, and Hira finally breaks out of her shell of sadness, realizing Naveed’s sincere efforts to develop their relationship. Naveed, too, realizes his selfishness and his mistake in separating a mother from her son. He asks Hira to bring Ahmer back. However, on reaching Kamal’s house, Hira discovers the truth but is unable to do anything because Kamal has handed Ahmer over to Rizwana after legally making her his guardian. Hira is devastated after learning what has happened to her son and suffers a nervous breakdown. Kamal and Kulsoom informs Naveed about Ahmer’s adoption by Rizwana. He investigates the legal procedures and discovers that Kamal’s decision to hand Ahmer over to Rizwana is legally unjustified because Ahmer’s mother is still alive. He brings Ahmer back and takes him to the hospital, where Hira has been admitted. Hira regains consciousness and, upon seeing Ahmer, embraces him.

== Cast and characters ==
- Sanam Baloch as Hira
- Shabbir Jan as Naveed Murad
- Qavi Khan as Akbar
- Parveen Akbar as Nusrat
- Deeba as Shamshad Begum
- Shagufta Ejaz as Rizwana
- Rashid Farooqui as Hafeez
- Hasan Ahmed as Kamal
- Madiha Rizvi as Kulsoom
- Hannan Sameed as Jamal
- Amna Kareem as Anum
- Amber Nausheen as Safia
- Kanwal Nazar as Naghma
- Fahad Mustafa as Mazhar (Episode 1)
- Sami Khan as Feroze (Episode 8)
- Zuhab Khan as Ahmer & Young Mazhar (Episode 16)
- Arisha Razi as Young Rizwana (Episode 16)

== Production ==
Writer Faiza Iftikhar reflected in a 2013 interview that although the subject of Zindagi Dhoop Tum Ghana Saya was initially worthwhile, she became critical of the subsequent repetition of similar storylines centred on helpless widowed women and orphaned children on television.

=== Crew ===
- Written by : Faiza Iftikhar
- Directed by : Atif Hussain
- Produced by : Humayun Saeed and Abdullah Kadwani (7th Sky Entertainment)

== Reception ==
A reviewer from the Dawn praised the serial for its engaging storyline, direction, soulful title song and powerful performances by the actors, but found it emotionally draining rather than relaxing due to its excessive emotional intensity and tragic events. In a review published in Mag The Weekly, the reviewer praised all the actors' performances especially Sanam Baloch, and found the story "enthralling" and "gripping".
