= Ghundi =

2013 Pakistani television comedy drama series

- Written by: Faiza Iftikhar
- Directed by: Kashif Nisar
- Opening theme: Sahir Ali Bagga
- Composer: Sahir Ali Bagga
- Country of origin: Pakistan
- Original languages: Urdu; Punjabi
- No. of episodes: 24

Production
- Producers: Humayun Saeed; Shehzad Naseeb
- Production location: Lahore
- Editor: Aman Ali Butt
- Production company: Six Sigma Plus

Original release
- Network: Hum Sitaray
- Release: 22 December 2013 – 1 June 2014

Ghundi (transl. Female hooligan) is a 2013 Pakistani television comedy drama series directed by Kashif Nisar, written by Faiza Iftikhar, and produced by Humayun Saeed and Shehzad Naseeb under the banner of Six Sigma Plus. It stars Uroosa Siddiqui, Uzma Hassan, Haseeb Muhammad Bin Qasim, Sohail Sameer, Agha Ali, and Rahma Ali in leading roles.

== Plot ==
The series centres on a Pehalwan family from Lahore consisting of three brothers whose devotion to their younger sister has left her considerably indulged. The family strives to fulfil her every wish and seeks to arrange her marriage.

== Cast ==
- Uroosa Siddiqui as Neelofar Chaudhry (Neelo), the spoilt only daughter of the Pehalwan family
- Haseeb Muhammad Bin Qasim as Yaqoob, Neelo's eldest brother
- Sohail Sameer as Saqib, Neelo's second brother
- Kamran Mujahid as Neelo's younger brother, a Pehalwan
- Uzma Hassan as Rukhsana, Yaqoob's wife
- Agha Ali as Rehan, Yaqoob's adopted son
- Adnan Shah Tipu as Mateen
- Farhana Maqsood as Marjana, Saqib's friend
- Farah Tufail as Nargis, Neelo's friend
- Rahma Ali as Zoya
- Tahira Imam as Zoya's mother

== Reception ==
Writing in The Friday Times, Saima S. Hussain criticised the series for weak storytelling, stock characters, and an unconvincing portrayal of a school setting, and observed that Siddiqui had delivered stronger performances in earlier work.
