= Manay Na Ye Dil =

Pakistani TV series

- Genre: Drama
- Written by: Samira Fazal
- Directed by: Babar Javed
- Starring: Faisal Qureshi; Aisha Khan; Deepti Gupta; Nadia Hussain; Faisal Rehman
- Theme music composer: Kunal Ganjawala
- Opening theme: Suni Suni Raatay
- Country of origin: Pakistan
- Original language: Urdu
- No. of episodes: 27

Production
- Producer: Momina Duraid
- Production locations: Pakistan and Australia
- Running time: 40–42 minutes

Original release
- Network: Hum TV
- Release: 2 September 2007 – 13 April 2008

Manay Na Ye Dil (lit: The heart doesn't listen) is a Pakistani television series that first aired on Hum TV in 2007 and is directed by Babar Javed. The story is based on the emotional conflicts of four people who feel powerless to control their feelings.

== Plot ==
Zainab, an orphan who has been raised by her aunt, has since childhood been in love with her aunt's son, Sheheryar. Sheheryar ends up in an arranged marriage with Rubab, a selfish woman and the complete opposite of what Sheheryar expects in a wife. When Rubab aborts their child, Sheheryar loses his mind and in deep depression, he becomes involved with Roshni, a prostitute. Sheheryar falls in love with Roshni, but his mother manipulates the situation in such a way that Zainab and Sheheryar get married. Sheheryar, however, does not forget his love and goes in search of Roshni. He finds that Roshni is happily married to another man in Australia and has a son now. Sheheryar does not realize that he is in fact the father of the child. An obsessed Sheheryar tries to reconcile with Roshni, and they succeed. The drama ends with both leaving together.

== Cast ==
- Faysal Qureshi as Sheheryar
- Nadia Hussain as Rubab
- Deepti Gupta as Zainab
- Aisha Khan as Roshni/ Kiran
- Faisal Rehman as Shaheer
- Shamim Hilaly as Roshni's mother
- Ayesha Khan as Suriya

== Production ==
Nadia Jamil was offered the female lead role, but she turned it down because she did not want to travel to Australia, where the serial was to be filmed. The role was later portrayed by Ayesha Khan, who noted that her performances in this role and in Khamoshiyan drew criticism of her girl-next-door image.

== Reception ==
Fozia Mapara of the DAWN Images praised the series for its suspenseful storyline, screenplay, production, cinematography, title song, and acting, particularly highlighting Faisal Rehman's subtle expressions and Deepti Gupta's composure but faulted for minors flaws in direction.

== Accolades ==
8th Lux Style Awards
| Category | Recipient | Result | Ref |
|---|---|---|---|
| Best TV Director (Satellite) | Babar Javed | Nominated | |
| Best TV Actor (Satellite) | Faysal Quraishi | Nominated | |

== See also ==
- Noorpur Ki Rani
- Aashti
- Mannchalay
- Dil, Diya, Dehleez
- Malaal
