= Challenger (2013 game show) =

- Title card
- Genre: Reality competition, Game show
- Directed by: Farhan Shahzad
- Presented by: Fahad Sheikh
- Country of origin: Pakistan
- Original language: Urdu

Production
- Running time: 60 minutes

Original release
- Network: Hum Sitaray
- Release: 19 December 2013

Challenger is a Pakistani reality-based adventure game show, first aired 19 December 2013 on Hum Sitaray. The show offers 16 candidates the chance to be stranded in a remote locale, with limited resources, in the hopes that one person will outlast the others and secure the show's one-million-dollar prize. Each week, the contestants have to perform a variety of exhausting tasks: the winners get extra supplies; the losers get voted off the site.
