= Faiza Iftikhar =

Pakistani author and screenwriter

- Born: Lahore, Punjab
- Occupations: Novelist, screenwriter, author
- Writing career
- Language: Urdu
- Notable works: Dil Lagi, Aunn Zara, Ranjha Ranjha Kardi

Faiza Iftikhar is a Pakistani writer, author, novelist and screenwriter. She is active in the Pakistani television industry and known for her romantic and social plays. Her popular plays include Dil Lagi, Aunn Zara, and Ranjha Ranjha Kardi. Her screenplay for Ranjha Ranjha Kardi earned her the Lux Style Award of Best TV Writer. Her recent projects are Bandhay Aik Dor Say, Pehli Si Muhabbat and Prem Gali. She has also written the screenplay for Lollywood movie Tich Button.

== Education and background ==
Iftikhar has a masters' in political science and sociology. She has a son and two daughters and currently resides in Lahore. She has stated that Urdu writer Altaf Fatima encouraged her to write when she was her student.

== Career ==
Iftikhar wrote her script for the television Haroon Tou Piya Teri in 2008, based on her novel "Dasi Dholan Yaar Di". However, the ramadan special romantic-comedy Chaudhween Ka Chand completed its production earlier and broadcast earlier, marking her debut as a screenwriter.

== Notable work ==
=== Novels ===
- Hissar-e-Mohabbat
- Ghar Aangan
- Mera Tera Khali Kamra Hoon
- Phulaan De Rang Kale
- MeDi boli Punjabi
- Saray Gulab Le Jana
- Roag

=== Drama serials ===
- Chudhvin Ka Chand
- Mannchalay
- Tum Jo Miley
- Tujh Pe Qurban
- Diya Jalay
- Shehr e Dil Ke Darwazay
- Zindagi Dhoop Tum Ghana Saya
- Roag
- Akbari Asghari
- Mohabbat Rooth Jaye Toh
- Bilqees Kaur
- Yahan Pyar Nahin Hai
- Thakan
- Piya Ka Ghar Pyara Lagay
- Aik Nayee Cinderella
- Khailoon Pyaar Ki Baazi

Year	Title	Network	Ref(s)
2013	Khoya Khoya Chand	Hum TV	
2013	Meri Zindagi Hai Tu	Geo Entertainment	
2013	Ghundi	Hum Sitaray	
2014	Kahani Raima Aur Manahil Ki	Hum TV	
2014	Tum Woh Nahi	Express Entertainment	
2014	Aap ki Kaneez	Geo Entertainment	
2014	Uff Yeh Mohabbat	Geo Entertainment	
2015	Kaanch Ki Guriya	Geo Entertainment	
2016	Mein Sitara	TV One Pakistan	
2016	Aap Ke Liye	ARY Digital	
2016	Dil Lagi	ARY Digital	
2016	Dil Banjaara	Hum TV	
2016	Kathputli	Hum TV	
2016	Sakeena	A-Plus TV	
2017	Shayad	Geo Entertainment	
2017	Pinjra	A-Plus TV	
2017	Aangan	ARY Digital	
2017	Mubarak Ho Beti Hui Hai	ARY Digital	
2018	Woh Mera Dil Tha	ARY Digital	
2018	Baba Jani	Geo Entertainment	
2018	Ranjha Ranjha Kardi	Hum TV	
2020	Bandhay Aik Dor Say	Geo Entertainment	
2020	Prem Gali	ARY Digital	
2021	Pehli Si Muhabbat	ARY Digital	
2022	Aik Thi Laila	Express Entertainment	
2026	Aik Mohabbat Aur	Green Entertainment	
2026	Mitti De Baway	Green Entertainment	

=== Telefilms ===
- Sudha Ki Katha
- Pyar Ki Love Story
- Rok Sako To Rok Lo
- Apni Apni Love Story
- Khana Khud Garam Karo

=== Films ===
- Tich Button

== Accolades ==
- Hum Award for Best Writer Drama Serial for Bilqees Kaur – Nominated
- Hum Award for Best Writer Drama Serial for Yahan Pyar Nahin Hai – Nominated
- PISA Awards of Best TV Writer for Ranjha Ranjha Kardi – Nominated

=== Lux Style Awards ===
Ceremony	Category	Project	Result
12th Lux Style Awards	Lux Style Award for Best TV Writer	Bilqees Kaur	Nominated
13th Lux Style Awards	Lux Style Award for Best TV Writer	Aunn Zara	Nominated
16th Lux Style Awards	Lux Style Award for Best TV Writer	Dil Lagi	Nominated
18th Lux Style Awards	Lux Style Award for Best TV Writer	Aangan	Nominated
19th Lux Style Awards	Lux Style Award for Best TV Writer	Ranjha Ranjha Kardi	Won
