= Thakan =

- Also known as: Kamaau Bitiya
- Genre: Drama
- Written by: Faiza Iftikhar
- Directed by: Amin Iqbal
- Starring: See the section on cast below
- Music by: Azra Jehan
- Opening theme: Thakan
- Composer: Waqar Ali
- Country of origin: Pakistan
- Original language: Urdu
- No. of seasons: 1
- No. of episodes: 22

Production
- Producers: Asif Raza Mir; Babar Javed
- Production location: Pakistan
- Camera setup: Multi-camera setup
- Running time: Approx. 35-40 minutes
- Production company: A&B Productions

Original release
- Network: ARY Digital
- Release: 10 May – 11 October 2012

Thakan (Urdu: تھکن) is an Urdu language Pakistani television drama series directed by Amin Iqbal and written by Faiza Iftikhar. First broadcast in Pakistan by ARY Digital, Thakan features Saba Qamar, Yumna Zaidi, Saba Hameed, Tauqeer Nasir, Saboor Ali, Bindiya, Farooq Zameer, Anusheh Asad, Farah Tufail and Jabran Shahid. It revolves around the plight of a working woman who sacrifices her dreams for her family. Premiering on 10 May 2012, the 22-episode Thakan ended its run in Pakistan on 11 October 2012.

In 2014, the serial was broadcast on ARY Zauq. In India, it was broadcast by Zindagi, premiering on 31 August 2014 at 8:55 pm (IST) under the title Kamaau Bitiya. It ended its run in India on 21 September 2014; the show was later re-aired, beginning on 27 October 2014. The show was again re-run by ARY Network in 2016 on ARY Zindagi.

== Plot ==
Sadaf (Saba Qamar) works extremely hard like a machine day and night to run her family, but no one except her grandfather feels sympathy or even cares about her. She is the only working member of her family and has to look after her mother, grandfather, younger sister and younger brother. Sadaf faces a lot of difficulties, harassment and criticism at work, due to which she has to change her jobs frequently. She couldn't complete her education due to early responsibilities, hence is restricted to small menial jobs. But she continues to work to earn a livelihood and finally finds a stable, suitable and good job for herself. But despite working so hard and looking after her family, no one except her grandfather is concerned about her or is even loyal and faithful to her. Except for Sadaf's grandfather, everybody is self-concerned and selfish. And it happens one day that Sadaf visits her brother's college to pay the fees and learns that he had been suspended months back. Spending money on gambling, when confronted, he doesn't reveal the truth, and the next day, he steals money from home, injures his grandfather and flees, never to come back again. Sadaf's grandfather succumbs to his injuries and dies.

Similarly, by and by, the various facets of other people also come in front of Sadaf. For instance, Sadaf learns that the man she had thought of marrying didn't care about her but instead wanted to marry her as he expected her to be perfect and to look after his house and family. Similarly her brother-in-law, Khurshid informs her how her mother had refused the marriage proposals that had come for Sadaf in the past seven years to ensure that she remained in the house, worked and earned for the family. Deeply hurt, Sadaf decides to get married and leave the house. Sadaf's manager at the office, a lady, who happens to be a social worker, had always helped Sadaf in her difficult times and had also offered to help her with marriage. Thus, Sadaf informs her of her wish to get married soon, following which Sadaf's boss decides to get Sadaf married to her son, Kaashan, who happens to be a divorcee and a father of three kids, as she believes Sadaf to have all the qualities to look after the kids. And after marrying Kaashan, Sadaf does face problems in the initial stage but eventually copes up with them and begins to love Kaashan and his kids, and also succeeds in winning Kaashan's and as well as the kids' love and starts living a happy married life with him.

But this disturbs Sadaf's ex-boss, who now happens to be her mother-in-law, as she feels Kaashan gives undue importance to Sadaf. And thus, out of jealousy, she hatches a plot against Sadaf to create a bad image of her in the eyes of Kaashan. But her plans fail as Kaashan trusts Sadaf and later learns the truth, leaving her shocked and devastated. Sadaf had always been cheated and taken advantage of by her loved ones, begins to live a happy life with Kaashan and the kids.

== Cast ==
- Saba Qamar as Sadaf
- Yumna Zaidi as Mehak
- Saba Hameed as Zubaida, Sadaf and Mehak's mother
- Tauqeer Nasir as Kaashan Azmat, Sadaf's husband
- Bindiya as Izmat (Kaashan's mother)
- Farah Tufail as Deeba, elder sister of Sadaf
- Saniya Shamshad as Sofia, Kaashan's daughter
- Jabran Shahid as Fareed, Sadaf's younger brother
- Anusheh Asad as Roheena, Kaashan's sister-in-law
- Farooq Zameer as Sadaf's grandfather
- Bilal Qureshi as Jawad
- Beena Chaudhary as Zarina
- Noor ul Hassan as Khursheed
- Tahira Imam as Nadira

== Reception ==
=== Critical reception ===
While reviewing episodes 5–7, a reviewer from The Express Tribune said it was quite boring and pretty predictable. In an article by DAWN Images, the reviewer Sadaf Haider praised the nuanced portrayal of the working woman.
