= Sawaab =

Pakistani television series

- Genre: Family drama Serial drama
- Created by: Noor-ul-Huda Shah
- Written by: Ghazala Naqvi
- Directed by: Furqan .T. Siddiqui
- Starring: Sana Nawaz; Abid Ali; Samina Ahmed; Sohail Sameer; Yasra Rizvi; Khalid Malik
- Theme music composer: Saboor Khan
- Opening theme: Sayyian by Fareed Ayaz; Abu Muhammad
- Composer: Waqar Ali
- Country of origin: Pakistan
- Original language: Urdu
- No. of episodes: 30

Production
- Executive producers: Hum TV: Momina Duraid; Syed Mukhtar Ahmed Hum Sitaray: Nida Nadeem
- Cinematography: Babar Akbar
- Editor: Rizwan Ibrahim
- Camera setup: single camera
- Running time: 15 - 35 minutes
- Production company: MD Productions

Original release
- Network: Hum Sitaray
- Release: 18 June – 17 July 2015

Sawaab (Urdu: ثواب / Arabic: ثواب ; lit: Reward) is a Pakistani Ramadan special drama serial that originally premiered on Hum Sitaray from 18 June–17 July 2015 and then 7 June–6 July 2016 simultaneously on its parent channel Hum TV. Noor-ul-Huda Shah served as a showrunner and creator while it is directed by Furqan .T. Siddiqui, with the screenplay written by Ghazala Naqvi and produced by Momina Duraid under her company MD Productions. It stars Sana Nawaz, Abid Ali, Samina Ahmed, Sohail Sameer, Yasra Rizvi, and Khalid Malik in pivotal roles.

== Synopsis ==
Nimra is a young housewife, living in a big joint family. Being the only daughter- in- law, in Ramadan she is struggling hard to make everyone happy with her culinary expertise, but dealing with a diplomatic mother- in- law, cunning elder sister- in- law and ignorant husband becomes a tough job and emotional trauma for her. Nimra suffers a lot for her family. Eventually she emerges victorious.

== Cast ==
- Sana Nawaz as Nimra
- Abid Ali as Raziuddin (Nimra's paternal uncle & father-in-law)
- Samina Ahmed as Fehmida (Nimra's mother-in-law)
- Sohail Sameer as Kamal (Nimra's husband)
- Yasra Rizvi as Sadia (Kamal & Nehal's sister)
- Khalid Malik as Kamran (Nimrah's brother & Kamal, Nehal, Rehan, Maria's first mother-side cousin)
- Raima Khan
- Iqra Mughal as Maria (Sadia's sister)
- Zaryan Hasan as Nehal (Kamal's brother)
- Salman Faisal as Rehaan (Kamal's brother)
- Sajwa Binte Shahid

== Reception ==
The drama series garnered numerous praise for its tune and was named highest rated drama series during Ramadan.

== See also ==
- 2016 in Pakistani television
- List of programs broadcast by Hum TV
