= Aik Larki Aam Si =

2018 Pakistani television series

- Original title: ur
- Genre: Romantic drama; Serial drama; Soap
- Written by: Waseem Ahmed
- Directed by: Muhammad Adeel Siddiqui
- Starring: Anmol Baloch; Babar Khan
- Country of origin: Pakistan
- Original language: Urdu
- No. of seasons: 1
- No. of episodes: 159

Production
- Producer: Momina Duraid
- Production location: Pakistan
- Camera setup: Multi-camera setup
- Production company: MD Productions

Original release
- Network: Hum TV
- Release: 19 June 2018 – 1 February 2019

Aik Larki Aam Si (Eng: An Ordinary Girl) is a Pakistani television soap opera that premiered on Hum TV on 19 June 2018. It is produced by Momina Duraid under MD Productions. It stars Anmol Baloch and Babar Khan in leads while Jahanzeb Khan, Fawad Jalal and Ismat Iqbal in supporting roles.

== Plot ==
Anmol is a poor girl who lives with her widowed mother and younger sister Nayab. She starts a job at an office to overcome her family's financial issues as her younger sister is about to get married in a few months. One day on her way home from office, she meets with an accident by Farhan's car. Farhan takes her to the hospital and leaves before she regains consciousness.

On her sister's marriage, Farhan (who also attends the marriage) meets Anmol and realizes that she was the same girl his car had accidentally hit. Farhan starts to like Anmol. A few days after marriage, Farhan proposes to Anmol which she accepts. Then Anmol learns that Farhan is the fiancé of Subuhi (Nayab's sister-in-law). She decides to leave Farhan as it will affect Nayab's relations with her in-laws.

== Cast ==
- Anmol Baloch as Anmol
- Babar Khan as Farhan
- Jahanzeb Khan as Minhaj
- Fawad Jalal as Aazan; Farhan's brother
- Aamna Malick as Faryal; Aazan's wife
- Ismat Iqbal; Minhaj's mother
- Annie Zaidi as Farhan's mother
- Nawal Saeed as Nayab; Anmol's sister, Hamza's wife
- Yasir Ali Khan as Hamza; Subuhi's brother, Nayab's husband
- Hiba Aziz as Subuhi; Farhan's ex-fiancée
- Munazzah Arif as Sadia; Anmol and Nayab's mother
- Nargis Bhatti as Hamza and Subuhi's mother
- Khushi Maheen as Aazan and Faryal's daughter
- Faria Bukhari
- Ayesha Khan
