= Eman Suleman =

Pakistani model and actress (born 1992)

- Born: 1 January 1992 (age 34); Islamabad, Pakistan
- Citizenship: Canada
- Education: Beaconhouse National University
- Occupations: Actress, model
- Years active: 2017–present
- Height: 5'8
- Spouse: Jamil Haider (m. 2020)

Eman Suleman (born 1 January 1992) is a Pakistani model and actress. She started her modeling career in 2017 and since then has appeared on ramps and advertisements. She is also known for her role as Yasmeen in Sarmad Khoosat's Aakhri Station (2018). In 2019, she receives nomination for Best Emerging Model at 18th Lux Style Awards. Eman is a vocal feminist and has endorsed causes such as students' rights and the MeToo movement.

== Filmography ==
Year	Title	Role	Notes
2018	Aakhri Station	Yasmin	on ARY Digital
2019	Say it all with Iffat Omer		Episode 11
2019	Zindagi Tamasha	Sadaf	
2020	Churails	Mehak	Webseries

== Awards and nominations ==
Year	Award	Category	Result
2019	Lux Style Awards	Best Emerging Model	Nominated
