= Yeh Chahatein Yeh Shiddatein =

- Title screen
- Genre: Family drama Romantic drama
- Created by: Babar Javed
- Written by: Sumaira Sharif Toor
- Directed by: Ramish Rizvi
- Country of origin: Pakistan
- Original language: Urdu
- No. of episodes: 25

Production
- Producer: Babar Javed
- Camera setup: Multi-camera setup

Original release
- Network: Geo Entertainment
- Release: 16 July – 18 October 2016

Yeh Chahatein Yeh Shiddatein is a 2016 Pakistani drama serial based on the novel by same name. The serial stars Anum Fayyaz, Shahzad Noor, Fawad Jalal and Ahmed Majeed in lead roles. It is produced by Babar Javed.

== Synopsis ==
Nawaira never thought that her admirers would become a threat— them being her own cousins. Her engagement with Nawaz deeply hurts another cousin, Raza, who is younger than her but has been in love with her since childhood. Raza's feelings for Nawaira begin to sabotage his relationship with his fiancée Rimsha, because she is aware of his infatuation. As a result, Rimsha develops resentment for Nawaira.

Shariq, another cousin, also happens to be an admirer of Nawaira. Nawaira, who is unaware of this fact, often visits his house to inquire about her sick aunt. This is where this love rectangle gets worse. His love turns into obsession and when he finds out about the engagement, he decides to conquer his love in any circumstances. He kidnaps Nawaira and the engagement gets called off— which causes chaos in the lives of Raza and Nawaz.

== Cast ==
- Anum Fayyaz as Nawaira
- Shahzad Noor as Nawaz (Fiancé and Love interest of Nawaira)
- Fawad Jalal as Shariq Zaman(Main Antagonist: step cousin of Nawaira having a disturbed past)
- Ahmed Majeed as Raza (Nawaira's younger cousin who loves her since childhood)
- Humaira Zahid as (Mother of Nawaz who's against the marriage of Nawaira and Nawaz, and want Nawaz to marry Romaisa)
- Saba Faisal
- Faisal Naqvi as Nabeel
- Anam Tanveer
- Aleezay Tahir as Ramsha
- Azra Mansoor (Step-mother of Shariq)

== Broadcast and Release ==
The serial premiered on Geo Entertainment airing episodes twice a week (Saturday and Sunday) at prime time, from 16 July 2016. Since August 2020, It is available for streaming on Amazon Prime.
