= Ammara Butt =

Pakistani actress

- Born: 9 June 1998 (age 28); Lahore, Punjab, Pakistan
- Education: University of Lahore
- Occupation: Actress
- Years active: 2016–present

Ammara Butt is a Pakistani television actress. She is known for her role as Komal in Ranjha Ranjha Kardi (2018). She made her debut as a lead actress in A-Plus TV's Hoor Pari (2019). Her other appearances include Meherbaan (2017), De Ijazat (2018), Aakhri Station (2018) and Ajnabi Lage Zindagi (2019).

== Television ==
Year	Title	Role	Network	Refs
2017	Teen Kahani		Hum Sitaray	Lead Role
2017	Meherbaan	Mehru	A Plus TV	Lead Role
2018	De Ijazat	Soha	Hum TV	Lead Role
2018	Aakhri Station	Gul Meena	ARY Digital	Lead Role
2018	Main Woh Aur Main		PTV Home	Lead Role
2018–19	Ranjha Ranjha Kardi	Komal	Hum TV	Lead Role
2018–19	Hoor Pari	Durdana	A-Plus TV	Lead Role
2019	Ajnabi Lage Zindagi	Zoha	LTN Family	Lead Role
2017	Apnay		See TV	Lead Role
2017	Jaltay Khuwab		A Plus	Second Lead
