= Aakhri Station (miniseries) =

2018 Pakistani TV mini-series

- Genre: Drama; Social drama
- Written by: Amna Mufti
- Directed by: Sarmad Khoosat
- Presented by: Kashf Foundation
- Starring: Sanam Saeed; Mikaal Zulfiqar; Nimra Bucha; Eman Suleman; Anam Goher; Malika Zafar; Ammara Butt; Farah Tufail; Irfan Khoosat
- Opening theme: Shabana Azmi
- Country of origin: Pakistan
- Original language: Urdu
- No. of episodes: 7

Production
- Production companies: Kashf Foundation; Khoosat Films

Original release
- Network: ARY Digital
- Release: 13 February – 27 March 2018

Aakhri Station (Urdu: آخری سٹیشن; English: The Last Station) is a seven-part Pakistani television drama mini-series, created by Sarmad Khoosat and Kashf Foundation. It premiered on ARY Digital on 13 February 2018 and concluded on 28 March 2018. Written by Amna Mufti, it is directed and co-produced by Khoosat with Roshaneh Zafar of Kashf Foundation Productions and Australian Department of Foreign Affairs and Trade. The series consist of seven episodes.

The show introduced an ensemble cast with Sanam Saeed, Nimrah Bucha, Malika Zafar, Anam Goher, Eman Suleman, Ammara Butt and Farah Tufail portraying seven strangers with different economic, social and cultural backgrounds suffering from domestic and mental issues, meeting in a train compartment en route to Karachi. The show aims to explore women-eccentric subjects that its creators feel have not been emphasized in Pakistani shows openly, such as women's rights, drug abuse, HIV, PTSD, acid attacks, forced prostitution, and domestic violence.

The OST, a rendition of an Amjad Islam Amjad poem, ‘Mujhe Apne Jeenay Ka Haq Chaihiye‘ has been composed by Arshad Mahmood and sung by Tahira Syed. The last verse of the poem is recited by Indian actress Shabana Azmi.

== Episodes ==
=== Episode 1 ===
A group of women, each belonging to a different socioeconomic class, sit together in a train compartment, going to Karachi.

They are joined by two more; a mother, Yasmin, and her daughter, Mahno, and a transgender lady.

The trans woman was being insulted in another compartment, whereupon an old conductor intervened and told the culprit to fear God, as He created all and that all people have a right on the land. He advised the trans woman to move to a place in the front, and call for him in case of any trouble.

Back in the main compartment, the lady in the saree, Tehmina, commented on the various new colours of nail polish, causing Yasmin, who was wearing turquoise on one hand, to say "i hate this, it's not coming off". Tehmina offered Yasmin cotton and nail polish remover.

It is revealed that Yasmin belonged to a very poor family, and lived with her parents in law and husband, Waqar, who would not work. They were knee deep in debt, to the extent people had started to shame her. The man she was married to was an alcoholic, a gambler and had sold every sellable item in the house.

He stole Yasmin's gold earrings, which her mother had gifted her before she died, sold them, and lost all the money in a bet. His friends offered to give him a loan for another game, in exchange for a night with his wife. The man agreed. Drunk and staggering he went home and opened a room at the roof of his house which was flooded with red light. He laid down a mattress on it and put a bedsheet on it. Then he went down to talk to Yasmin who immediately asked about the money from the earrings. Waqar told her to wash her face and commented on how unkept she looked. She responded by saying that washing her face won’t get them any money. The man pulled her by force and dragged her out where he washed her face under a tap with extreme force. Then he took her to the room on the roof and another guy went in after which the door was promptly locked with Waqar outside smoking a cigarette and not responding to his wife’s cries of help.

Yasmin was traumatized. The man boasted of a "business" to his parents, who were clueless. At night, he told her soon their daughter would run this (inhumane) business and earn for them, and then the "clients" were about to arrive. He had brought with him a turquoise nail polish, a red lipstick and a wine bottle which he thought were necessities to lure men in and make them happy with the “service”. His friends had told him that he need never worry about money because he had a “blank cheque” at home. He had started applying nail polish on her finger nails while she blankly stared ahead clearly traumatised. But when she heard the comment about her daughter, she took out the red lipstick and went to the mirror to put it on, her stare wasn’t blank anymore.

She put on an act, and fooled the man into thinking she was okay with his crimes. She asked him to go buy some ice for the alcohol that he brought.

As soon as he left, she grabbed her daughter and made a run for it.

=== Episode 2 ===
The other women consoled Yasmin and assured her she did the right thing.

But Yasmin's pain triggered another passenger, Gul Meena.

Gul Meena was very nearly due, and had left her village with her husband, Yousuf, and in laws, to escape war.

They travelled from refugee camp to refugee camp on buses, looking for a new place to restart life.

In a camp one night, everyone was awoken by a woman's wailing. She too had left to flee the war, but while she was asleep, a man got into her tent and snatched her only family, a young daughter.

Contractions hit Gul Meena, who started to cry out in pain. Her mother in law, Ma Gul, forbade Yousuf from looking for a gynecologist. He went anyway and returned late in the night with the doctors address and a horse ridden cart.

Yousuf talked his father into travelling to the next camp with Ma Gul and brother, Younas, while he himself would take his wife to the city to visit the doctor.

On the way to the city, Gul Meena was in pain again, and Yousuf asked the driver to take him and his wife to his, the driver's, place.

Yousaf was given the good news of the birth of his first child, a son.

The new parents tried to track down Yousuf's family but could not find them. Some time later, while going for the Fajr prayer, Yousuf suffered a sudden heart attack, and died before he could be rushed to a doctor.

Gul Meena's in laws were finally traced, and they came to take her and her son, Rustum Khan, home.

Ma Gul, who already disliked her daughter in law as it was, began to loathe her, accuse her of Yousuf's death, and curse her.

She then falsely accused Gul Meena of trying to "trap" Younas.

Gul Meena had had enough and agreed to marry their old, aged neighbor, but on the condition that she would take her baby with her.

After the nikkah, the man refused to take in Rustum Khan, and Gul Meena was forcibly taken inside, empty handed. Yousuf's family move with Rustum to Karachi.

Meanwhile, the old man began to question Gul Meena's character without any basis. She begged him to let her bring her child back, but he refused, because she nothing more than a slave to him.

In his anger, he said he'd beat her up, and that there was no space for her in his home if she kept crying for the son of another man, and then left for work.

Gul Meena decided she would no longer live without Rustum, and ran.

Episode 3:

Tehmina had a flashback of witnessing her mother's suicide as a child.

The train stopped along the way and the Conductor came to recheck everyone's tickets. Yasmin left the berth to hide from him, as she did not have one. He went after her and she excused herself, telling him she ran away from an abusive husband and did not have the money to purchase a ticket. A woman listening to the conversation began to call Yasmin out saying "women must bear everything". The Conductor corrected the lady, reminding her the females are also Gods creation, and should not be oppressed.

He bought Yasmin a ticket, and, upon her insisting, agreed to give her his address so she would be able to pay him back.

Back in the compartment, a few ladies were singing, and Farzana, who was trying to sleep in the top bunk, snapped at them.

She then apologized saying she had been up all night, listening to the others talk, and could not help but feel like, unlike the others, she herself was solely responsible for her misery.

Upon Tehmina's inquiring, she told them she was educated woman, with a masters degree. She had met a guy, Sajjad, at her university, and despite her parents warning her not to, kept seeing him. They were eventually married.

Sajjad always complained of how his family would demean him all the time, and would win Farzana's sympathy. For this reason, they move out of the family home. However, some time after marriage, she saw he was actually vain and bitter. He began to project all his negative emotions onto her, being pleased by emotionally abusing her.

They had a daughter, nicknamed Bunty, upon whom they would both dote. Sajjad didn't earn enough to be able to singly support his family, and, because of his own insecurities and shortcomings, began to accuse Farzana of working just to "spend time with other men".

Her self control broke one day, and she retaliated, attacking him with words as poisonous as his own. This drove Sajjad mad, and he dragged her into a room and beat her up.

== Synopsis ==
Each episode explores a different story based on women's empowerment and social issues affecting women, especially in Pakistan.

== Cast ==
- Sanam Saeed as Tehmina
- Eman Suleman as Yasmeen
- Nimra Bucha as Shabana
- Ammara Butt as Gul Meena
- Malika Zafar as Farzana
- Anam Goher as Shumaila
- Farah Tufail as Rafiya
- Adeel Afzal as Parvez
- Irfan Khoosat as Train ticket checker
- Mikaal Zulfiqar as Rehan; Tehmina’s Husband.
- Shah Fahad as Sajjad; Farzana's husband
- Adnan Sarwar as Waqar; Yasmeen's husband
- Sarmad Khoosat as Narrater (voice cameo)
- Tipu Sultan
- Faadil
- Sara Khawaja
- Razia Malik
- Faryal Butt
- Salman Gohar
- Ameer Hamza
- M Arman
