= Mehman (TV series) =

- Written by: Zafar Mairaj
- Directed by: Zeba Bakhtiar
- Starring: Aisha Khan; Sami Khan; Maira Khan; Ayub Khosa; Hina Dilpazir
- Country of origin: Pakistan
- Original language: Urdu

Original release
- Network: ARY TV
- Release: 2008 – 2008

Mehman is a Pakistani television serial written by Zafar Mairaj, and directed and produced by Zeba Bakhtiar. The series stars Ayub Khosa, Sami Khan, Aisha Khan and Maira Khan. It aired on ARY TV in 2008.

== Plot ==
Surraiyya, Wali Khan's widow comes from Malaysia to Quetta to the family of his deceased husband. She wants to marry her daughter, Shireen, in the family and tells them the reason of her arrival. The brothers of her deceased husband couldn't not find a suitable match from the family for her daughter and ultimately decides to send their eldest son Gulraiz, who is engaged already, with her as Shireen's husband. It leads to heartbreak of Nargis, Gulriaz's fiancé since childhood. Nargis' father asks for her willingness to call off her engagement so that he could marry Shireen. Nargis replies affirmatively and the Nikkah of Gulraiz and Shireen takes place over the phone. After the nikkah, Surraiyya and Gulraiz leaves for Malaysia. There, Gulraiz and Shireen finds problems to adjust with each other due to the sudden commencement of their relationship and the differences in their upbringing culture.

== Cast ==
- Ayub Khosa as Jahandad Khan
- Sami Khan as Gulraiz Khan
- Aisha Khan as Nargis
- Maira Khan as Shireen
- Amanullah Nasir as Rozi Khan
- Hina Dilpazir Khan as Surraiyya
- Shameem Kazi as Addy
- Durdana Baloch as Zubeida
- Kinza as Rukhsana
- Mariya Khan as Zarina
- Hidayat Saleem Rozi Khan
- Usman Haneed as Gulshair Khan
- Shabbir Jan as Raju
- Hameed Sheikh as Rohail
- Pushpa Narayan as Laila

== Production ==
Aisha Khan was selected to portray the pivotal character, and was convinced for a three-episodes appearance by the director and producer Zeba Bakhtiar due to the Pashtun background of Khan.

Mehman was shot in Malaysia.

== Reception ==
In a review published in the DAWN Images, the reviewer Fouzia Mapara criticised the serial panning Maira Khan's hysterical histrionics, Hina Dilpazir's accent, and further found that the seeial comes across as unintentionally funny.
