= Vasl (TV series) =

- Genre: Romance; Family drama
- Written by: Samira Fazal
- Directed by: Mehreen Jabbar
- Starring: Imran Abbas; Ayesha Khan; Juggan Kazim; Salma Hassan; Ahsan Khan; Adnan Siddiqui; Badar Khalil
- Country of origin: Pakistan
- Original language: Urdu
- No. of episodes: 18

Production
- Producer: Momina Duraid
- Production locations: Panama City, Florida
- Running time: 50 minutes

Original release
- Network: Hum TV
- Release: 2 March – 10 June 2010

Vasl(Urdu: وصَل, lit. 'Union') is a 2010 Pakistani drama serial that was first telecast on Hum TV on 2 March 2010. It is directed by Mehreen Jabbar and written by Samira Fazal. Produced by Momina Duraid, the serial follows the struggle of a mother who wants to reunite with her children as her husband has divorced her.

== Summary ==
Hashim and Hina are a married couple living in the United States with their children Soni and Naeel. Hina is a perfect wife and a caring mother but misses her family living in Pakistan. One day Hashim hands over airplane tickets to Hina and asks her to visit her family in Pakistan with Soni and Naeel. Henna gets happy and visits her family. Her family includes her parents, two brothers, a sister-in-law and a niece. After a few days, Hashim calls his kids back as he doesn't want them to miss their school. Within a few days, Hina receives divorce papers and is devastated. As she doesn't have a green card she can't go back to US. Meanwhile, Hashim is having an extramarital affair with his best friend Nabeel's wife Kamla. Hashim marries Kamla but his children don't accept Kamla as their mother. Hina is desperate to meet her children and meets Nabeel who proposes to Henna to take revenge from Hashim. Hina rejects his proposal. Her children find it difficult to stay with Kamla. Kamla too feels that it would be better if the children go to their mother. She sets up a plan to send Soni and Naeel to Hina but is caught by Hashim. Hashim divorces Kamla. Hina's younger brother Adeel has a friend Marina, who sets up her maternal uncle (Mamu) Salman's marriage with Hina. Hina doesn't want to be married but marries him as he promises her that he would take her to US where she can actually meet her children and get their custody. Adeel on the other hand, likes a girl Roma and takes Marina's help. Marina secretly loves Adeel but is in an inferiority complex of being overweight. Adeel soon realises his love for Marina and proposes to her. Salman is suffering from impotency and Hina feels cheated for not being told about this and even calls him gay. Salman tells her that she is treating him the way Hashim treated her. Hina apologises and visits a doctor with Salman. Marina loses weight and surprises Adeel and his family on the day of their marriage. Salman offers a job to Adeel in U.S.A. Hina soon conceives, Salman is extremely happy but denies his promise as he doesn't want Hina to neglect herself being pregnant. Salman, Hina, Adeel and Marina arrive in U.S.A. Hina keeps on insisting but is denied to meet her children. Salman again promises her that as soon as their baby is born, he would take her to meet Soni and Naeel. Marina applies for her master's in a university. Adeel opposes her decision but is later convinced by Hina. A baby girl is born and is named Zarlina (Zee). Meanwhile, Hashim arrives in Pakistan with his kids to meet Hina and is informed about Hina's second marriage. He calls Salman so the children could meet Hina but is denied. Hina is eager to meet her children but is denied by Salman as he thinks Hina would forget about Zee as soon as she meets Soni and Naeel. Hina neglects Zarlina and insist Salman but soon realises her duty of being Zee's mother. After a few years, when Zee grows up, Hina shows her pictures of Soni and Naeel. Zee demands to meet her older siblings. Marina gets a job which saddens Adeel as he wants a baby now. One day, Hina meets Hashim and demands to see her children. She accompanies Hashim to his home and is devastated to see Soni being so spoilt drug addict and Naeel being always alone. She finds that her kids hate her for not showing up as Hashim had lied to them that it was all Hina's fault. Hina stays there in order to get the things done but still hates Hashim. Salman is furious and goes with Zee to Hashim's place. Hina blames him that because of him, her children are so spoilt and hates her. Salman in guilt, leaves Zee with her. Soni hates Zee and warns Hina to leave her house or else she would cause a trouble. Naeel likes Zee and even plays with her. Soni kidnaps Zee and asks Hina to leave the house. Hina readily accepts which hurts Soni as she thinks Hina only loves Zee. She doesn't agree. Salman comes to meet Zee but is surprised by Soni's set up. Zee, who lives at Soni's friend's house still loves her elder sister. Soni exploits Zee but also takes care of her at her friend's house. Soni's friend calls up Hina one day and apologizes. Hina takes Zee with her and is leaving Hashim's house. Before leaving, she tells Soni that she isn't aware of the truth. Hashim confronts Soni about all he had done. Hina decides to leave alone as Salman didn't kept his promise. Soni talks to Hina and tells her not to leave Zee alone. Marina decides to leave Adeel thinking him as a male chauvinist but Salman tells her that it is she who is a problem in living with and must not leave Adeel as he truly loves her. Marina apologizes to Adeel for her headstrong behavior and lives a happy life with him and even plans for a child. Soni and Naeel refuse to stay with Hashim and stay with Hina and often meet Zee. Soni tells Hina to get back with Salman as he is a nice person. Hina forgives Salman and gets back to him with her children.

== Cast ==
=== Main ===
- Ayesha Khan as Hina
- Juggan Kazim as Marina
- Ahsan Khan as Adeel
- Adnan Siddiqui as Hashim
- Faisal Rehman as Salman
- Tooba Siddiqui as Kamla

=== Recurring ===
- Ayesha Khan as Saima
- Badar Khalil
- Shehryar Zaidi
- Shahood Alvi
- Salma Hassan
- Eshita Mehboob
- Zarmala Gilani
- Imran Abbas as Nabeel (Cameo)

== Broadcast and release ==
The series originally premiered on Hum TV from 2 March 2010 to 10 June 2010.

The show was also broadcast in India on Zindagi premiering on 2 May 2016.

The series was made available on iflix in 2017 but later pulled off and from mid-2020, the show is available for streaming on indian OTT platform ZEE5.
