= Dushman e Jaan =

Pakistani television series

- Genre: Thriller; Romance; Crime drama
- Written by: Sarwat Nazir
- Directed by: Amin Iqbal
- Starring: Mohib Mirza; Madiha Imam; Tooba Siddiqui
- Theme music composer: Naveed Naushad
- Opening theme: "Dushman-e-Jaan" by Adnan Dhool & Rabi Ahmed
- Country of origin: Pakistan
- Original language: Urdu
- No. of episodes: 28

Production
- Executive producer: Nadeem Baig
- Producers: Humayun Saeed; Shahzad Nasib
- Running time: 35 to 45 Minutes
- Production company: Six Sigma Plus

Original release
- Network: ARY Digital
- Release: 1 June – 16 July 2020

Dushman-e-Jaan (Urdu: دشمنِ جان, lit. 'Mortal Enemy'), earlier titled Dushman, is a 2020 Pakistani crime romantic thriller television drama series that aired on ARY Digital. It is directed by Amin Iqbal and written by Sarwat Nazir. Produced by Humayun Saeed under Six Sigma Plus, it stars Mohib Mirza and Madiha Imam and also features Saba Hameed, Kashif Mehmood, Irfan Khoosat and Farah Tufail with Tooba Siddiqui in a special appearance.

This serial was shot approximately in 2018 but the release was delayed and was later telecasted after two years.

Also dubbed in Arabic, the serial broadcast on MBC Bollywood in Arab World under the title حُبك جرحني.

== Plot ==
Rubab and Ramsha are sisters. Ramsha is the one financially supporting their family, while Rubab continues her studies. Ramsha and Hatim work together as colleagues. Ramsha bumps into Hatim at work and all her papers fall, she gets mad at him and he talks back as well. Hatim has a very mean and arrogant personality partly because he never felt loved by his parents. Ramsha’s boss tells her that he is going on a trip and that Hatim will be her boss. Hatim tells her to call her Hatim sir since he owns 50% of the company. Ramsha dislikes Hatim but she has to work with him. One day he takes her to his house and tells his parents in front of people who came for his rishta that Ramsha is his wife. Ramsha was unaware of this and gets upset and leaves. Hatim tells his parents later that he lied and did this on purpose. His mother isn’t upset but his father is upset with him. Hatim apologizes to Ramsha the next day and gives her money which she does not accept but Hatim insists so she eventually takes it and Hatim mocks and insults her as she leaves out of the door. Eventually they both develop a better relationship and Ramsha explains to Hatim that every child loves their parents since he has a bad relationship with his parents especially his dad. He eventually gets closer to his mom and softens up. Hatim’s mother asks Hatim if he likes Ramsha and tells him she likes her. On Ramsha’s sisters (Rubab) wedding Ramsha has to leave in the middle for work and Hatim picks her up. They stop at his house to pick something up and Ramsha waits for him in the hall talking to his mother. His mother thanks Ramsha for changing Hatim and Hatim overhears their convo and misunderstands thinking his mother gave Ramsha money to change Hatim. In the car Hatim gets angry with Ramsha and asks her if his mother gave her money and she tries to explain but Hatim stops the car in the middle of nowhere and tells her to leave the car. She tells him to drop her home but he drags her out of the car and leaves. Ramsha is kidnapped that night and killed. When Hatim’s friend (Ramsha’s boss) arrives from his trip, he finds out Ramsha is missing and then discovers of her death. When Hatim finds out he tells his friend what he did and discovers of her innocence. Ramsha’s family is devastated by her death and Hatim feels very bad for what he did. He has nightmares of Ramsha telling him not to leave and he cannot stop thinking about her. Hatim’s guilt takes over him and he starts seeing Ramsha’s face in front of him. So he decides to help Ramsha’s family to try and makeup for what he did and pays for her brothers (who has a kidney problem) surgery. He marries Ramsha’s sister, Rubab as her engagement broke and takes her home but his parents are not aware as they are away on a trip. The next morning the servant sees Rubab and asks her if she is the new servant but Rubab doesn’t reply. Hatim walks in and tells her that she is his wife. He then takes her upstairs and asks her why she was quiet that she should have said she is his wife. As he is speaking to Rubab, Hatim’s friend (Ramsha’s boss) walks in and Hatim quickly takes him downstairs and explains to him that he married her but his friend asks him why he would marry her and if he has feelings for her but Hatim says he did it to repay for what he had done to her sister and that he doesn’t have feelings for her. Rubab overhears but leaves the room before hearing that Hatim is the cause of her sisters death. Eventually, Hatim and Rubab grow closer but whenever Rubab brings up anything about her sister he becomes tense and tries to change the subject. One day, one of Hatim’s girl friend shows up at his house unexpectedly and asks Hatim who Rubab is, he tells her she is his wife. His friend tells him that she can’t believe how a flirt guy like him got married. Rubab hears this and runs upstairs upset and Hatim follows her and explains her that they both must leave each other’s past behind and accept one another. One day Rubab goes to visit her sisters grave while Hatim is at work. Hatim calls her but she doesn’t pick up when he gets home he gets angry with her and yells at her a lot. She tells him she went to her sisters grave as it was her birthday and Hatim gets mad at her for always talking about her sister and for having to see Rubab crying. Rubab leaves to her room in anger and Hatim feels bad right away for what he said. He goes to her and apologizes. When Hatim’s parents arrive Hatim is not home and his father Kamal saab kicks Rubab out of the house without letting her speak so she goes to her fathers home. When Hatim finds out he gets angry with his father and tells his parents she is his wife. He goes to pick Rubab and brings her home. Hatim’s mother Fiza likes Rubab but his father does not. Eventually they move out because of his father as Hatim cannot stand his father insulting his wife. One day Rubab’s cousin and previous fiancé visits her showing her pictures of Hatim with a girl and tells her he has seen them together a lot. He does this on the saying of Hatim’s father who hired Rubab’s fiancé and is paying him to ruin Hatim‘s relationship. Rubab stops talking to Hatim as she thinks all this is true and Hatim asks her what’s wrong. She doesn’t tell him until he insists and he tells her all this is wrong and finds out his father did all this. Rubab becomes pregnant and they are very happy. Hatim takes good care of Rubab. Hatim tells his mom not to tell Kamal saab since he doesn’t have a good relationship with him so she does not. Hatim tells Rubab he wants a girl but Rubab tells him she wants a boy because she doesn’t want her girl to go through the same thing her sister Ramsha went through. They have a baby boy and are very happy. Hatim’s father finds out and comes to visit the baby in the hospital. Hatim sees his father and asks him why he came his father tells how could he hide such great news from him and that he found out. Hatim’s father comes and visits the baby at home too when Hatim is gone and apologizes to Rubab for not accepting her, Rubab forgives him. She tells Hatim his father came to visit and Hatim is angry at Rubab for letting him visit but Rubab tells him to forgive his father and makeup with him but Hatim doesn’t agree. Hatim and Rubab are happy with their son. Hatim takes Rubab to a restaurant where a man recognizes him. This man was the man who was looking through the security cameras when Hatim left Ramsha out in the middle of nowhere. So he has the footage of that night. The next day the same guy calls Hatim reminding him of the night of Ramsha’s death. Hatim gets angry at him for talking nonsense and denies anything of it. Hatim continues to get calls and is being threatened. The man wants a large amount of money from Hatim or he says he will tell the police and Rubab. Hatim tells him he will not give him anything so the man sends him the security footage of that night showing Hatim leaving Ramsha. Hatim is now confused what to do and worries that Rubab will find out about his truth. Rubab notices Hatim’s strange behavior as he’s constantly on the phone with his blackmailer. In Hatim’s absence his blackmailer calls so Rubab answers it and hears everything. She calls back the blackmailer and asks to meet him, he lies and tells Rubab that Hatim abused and killed Ramsha. Angered Rubab leaves the house when Hatim discovers this he goes crazy living in loneliness. He goes to visit Rubab but she refuses to talk to him. When she finally agrees Hatim tries to explain her that his only mistake was leaving Ramsha, but he did not kill or abuse her but Rubab doesn’t believe this. Hatim begs Rubab asking to meet his son Kasim but Rubab tells him only if he gives her a divorce this instant. So Hatim leaves back home. His father comes to visit him and apologizes to him for not being a good father, he promises him that he will bring Rubab back into his life again. Rubab goes to the police against Hatim so Hatim shows the police the video of his innocence that he only left Ramsha out alone. Hatim’s dad talks to Rubab to forgive Hatim and so she finally agrees. Hatim and Rubab are back together happily.

== Cast ==
- Mohib Mirza as Hatim
- Madiha Imam as Rubab Farooqui/Mrs. Rubab Hatim
- Tooba Siddiqui as Ramsha Farooqui
- Saba Hameed as Fiza Hatim's mother
- Imran Pirzada as Kamal Hatim's father
- Irfan Khoosat as Ahsan, Rubab and Ramsha's father
- Mohsin Gillani as Abid, Zaheer's father
- Kashif Mehmood
- Mubarak Ali as Zaheer, Ramsha and Rubab's cousin
- Farah Tufail as Rukhsana Zaheer
- Sofia Mirza as Miss Sumera
- Salma Saleem
- Mohammad Ali
- Adnan Haider as Uzair (Hatim Friend)

== Awards and nominations ==
Date of ceremony	Award	Category	Recipient(s) and nominee(s)	Result	Ref
March 2021	ARY People's Choice Awards	Favorite Actor	Mohib Mirza	Nominated	
5 November 2021	2nd Pakistan International Screen Awards	Best TV Serial	Humayun Saeed; Shahzad Nasib	Nominated	
5 November 2021	2nd Pakistan International Screen Awards	Best Television Director	Amin Iqbal	Nominated	
5 November 2021	2nd Pakistan International Screen Awards	Best Television Actor (Jury)	Mohib Mirza	Won	
5 November 2021	2nd Pakistan International Screen Awards	Best Supporting Actress	Tooba Siddiqui	Nominated	
5 November 2021	2nd Pakistan International Screen Awards	Best Writer	Sarwat Nazir	Nominated	
