= Mannchalay =

Pakistani television series

- Opening title screen
- Genre: Comedy; Drama
- Written by: Faiza Iftikhar
- Directed by: Roomi Insha
- Starring: Danish Taimoor; Sanam Baloch; Qavi Khan; Eshita Mehboob; Farhan Ally Agha; Nausheen Shah; Seemi Raheel
- Composer: Wajid Saeed
- Country of origin: Pakistan
- Original language: Urdu
- No. of episodes: 109

Production
- Producer: Momina Duraid
- Cinematography: Kaleem Hussain
- Editors: Mahmood Ali; Rajesh Kumar; Rao Rizwan
- Running time: ~20 minutes
- Production company: Moomal Productions

Original release
- Network: Hum TV
- Release: 13 July 2009 – 24 March 2010

Mannchalay (Urdu: من چلے) is a Pakistani comedy TV drama serial that was televised on Hum TV. The serial was written by Faiza Iftikhar and directed by Roomi Insha. It highlights the difference in thinking between the younger and older generations and shows how the two generations can walk forward hand-in-hand.

== Plot ==
Mannchalay is the story of the Khawaja family, headed by Khawaja Sahab. He is a loving but conservative father. He has three sons, Furqan, Usman, and Jibran and wants the three to marry three sisters named Mehnaz, Nazia and Fiza to keep the family united. However, the youngest son, Jibran likes another girl named Mitthu.

== Cast ==
- Danish Taimoor as Jibran, Khawaja and Sahiha's youngest son.
- Sanam Baloch as Mitthu, Jibran's love interest and then wife
- Qavi Khan as Khawaja Sahab
- Seemi Raheel as Sabiha Begum
- Farhan Ally Agha as Furqan Khawaja, Khawaja Sahab's elder son
- Nausheen Shah as Mehnaz, Usman's wife
- Hassan Ahmed as Usman Khawaja, khawaja Sahab's younger son
- Eshita Mehboob as Nazia, Furqan's wife

== See also ==
- Noorpur Ki Rani
- Aashti
- Dil, Diya, Dehleez
- Manay Na Ye Dil
- Malaal
