= Dil Ishq =

- Title Card
- Genre: Serial drama Romance
- Created by: Babar Javed
- Developed by: Faysal Manzoor
- Written by: Aneeza Syed
- Screenplay by: Faysal Manzoor
- Story by: Faysal Manzoor
- Directed by: Syed Ali Raza Usama
- Starring: Aijaz Aslam; Neelam Muneer; Ayesha Khan; Ali Abbas; Shamim Hilaly; Sohail Asghar; Shabbir Jan; Parveen Akbar
- Opening theme: Singer: Zamad Baig
- Country of origin: Pakistan
- Original language: Urdu
- No. of seasons: 1
- No. of episodes: 25

Production
- Producer: Babar Javed
- Production location: Pakistan
- Camera setup: Multi-camera setup
- Production company: Babar Javed

Original release
- Network: Geo Entertainment
- Release: 22 July – 8 December 2015

Dil Ishq (lit: "Heart Love") is a Pakistani romantic TV serial, directed by Syed Ali Raza Usama of Bashar Momin and written by Azeena Syed under the production house of Babar Javed. It was produced by Aijaz Aslam in his debut production, who also played the lead role on it alongside Ayesha Khan and Neelam Muneer. The drama was aired after Eid Ul Fitr on 22 July 2015.

It was released on Amazon Prime on 17 August 2020.

== Cast ==
- Aijaz Aslam as Mansoor
- Ayesha Khan as Dil Meher
- Neelam Muneer as Bakhtawar
- Shamim Hilaly as Mansoor's mother
- Sohail Asghar
- Shabbir Jan
- Parveen Akbar
- Ayesha Khan as Ama Jaan
- Kamran Jeelani
- Amir Qureshi
- Ayesha Toor
- Ali Abbas
