= Heer Ranjha (TV series) =

- Genre: Drama
- Based on: Heer Ranjha by Waris Shah
- Written by: Ahmed Aqeel Ruby
- Directed by: Shahid Zahoor
- Creative director: Yousuf Salahuddin
- Starring: Ahsan Khan; Zaria Butt; Sohail Sameer; Sadia Faisal
- Country of origin: Pakistan

Production
- Production company: PTV

Original release
- Network: PTV Home
- Release: 2 February 2013

Heer Ranjha (Urdu: ہیر رانجھا) is a 2013 Pakistani romance drama television serial, based on the classical poem of the same name by Waris Shah. It was directed by Shahid Zahoor and written by Ahmed Aqeel Ruby. The drama serial was aired on PTV Home, with the first episode broadcast on 2 February 2013. The serial stars Ahsan Khan, Zaria Butt, Shafqat Cheema, Sohail Sameer, Sadia Faisal, Saba Faisal, Mohsin Gillani, Masood Akhtar and Afzal Khan.

== Cast ==
- Ahsan Khan as Ranjha
- Zaria Butt as Heer
- Shafqat Cheema as Kedo
- Sohail Sameer as Murad
- Sadia Faisal as Sehti
- Saba Faisal as Heer's mother
- Mohsin Gillani as Heer's father
- Masood Akhtar as Ranjha's father
- Kinza Malik as Rani
- Beena Chaudhary as Bakhta
- Afzal Khan
