= Asian World Film Festival =

American annual film festival

The Asian World Film Festival (AWFF) is an annual film festival based in Los Angeles, California, founded by Kyrgyz filmmaker, Sadyk Sher-Niyaz in 2015. In its inaugural year, the festival ran from October 26 to November 2. Its awards are known as "Snow Leopard" awards.

== Founding ==
Sher-Niyaz founded the festival in late 2014, after his own experience in running a campaign for the Best Foreign Language Film category at the Academy Awards (Oscars). Sher-Niyaz was the director of the Kyrgyz submission, Queen of the Mountains (Kurmanjan Datka), which according to The Hollywood Reporter was predicted asone of the top 15 contenders.

Sher-Niyaz told TheWrap that he created the festival to help other Asian filmmakers in their Oscar campaigns: "I created the Asian World Film Festival to fill a void that I noticed was missing in America. There is a wealth of underrated filmmakers from our region that deserve recognition and this festival was designed to champion and promote them."

The inaugural festival ran from October 26 to November 2, 2015, supported by media partners TheWrap.

== Board members ==
As of 2021, the Asian World Film Festival board members comprise Lucy Liu, Lisa Lu, David Seidler, Jean-Marc Vallée, Joan Chen, Janet Yang, David Henry Hwang, Imran Khan, Tabrez Noorani, and Sergei Bodrov.

== "Snow Leopard" awards ==
The festival awards a number of awards: Best Film, Best Actor, Best Actress, Audience Award, Special Jury Award, Jury Discretionary Prize, Lifetime Achievement, Cinematic Legacy and Rising Star, which are prefixed by "Snow Leopard".

In 2021, renowned Vietnamese-American Artist Sir Daniel K. Winn was commissioned to create a new Snow Leopard award which was first awarded at closing ceremonies of the 7th edition of the festival on November 6, 2021.

== 2020/2021 editions ==
In its postponed 6th edition in March 2021, nearly 40 films from over 20 countries were presented over six days. They included 11 Oscar submissions for Best International Feature Film (the name of the category having changed in 2020), and 12 which were submitted for the Golden Globe Award for Best Foreign Language Film. Circus of Life, by Pakistani director Sarmad Sultan Khoosat, won the Snow Leopard Award for Best Film, while Better Days, by Hong Kong director Derek Tsang was awarded the Snow Leopard Special Jury Award.

The 2021 festival (7th edition) is scheduled to run from 1–11 November 2021.
