= De Ijazat =

Pakistani television series

- Zarnish Khan (left) and Mikaal Zulfiqar
- Genre: Drama
- Directed by: Asim Ali
- Starring: Zarnish Khan; Mikaal Zulfiqar
- Country of origin: Pakistan
- Original language: Urdu
- No. of seasons: 1
- No. of episodes: 38

Production
- Production location: Pakistan

Original release
- Network: Hum TV
- Release: 8 January – 15 May 2018

De Ijazat (Urdu: دے اجازت, lit. 'Permit Me!') is a Pakistani drama serial that aired on Hum TV from 8 January 2018 to 15 May 2018. The drama stars Zarnish Khan and Mikaal Zulfiqar in lead roles. The show aired Monday and Tuesday evenings.

== Plot ==
The drama is about two families; a middle-class family and a wealthy upper-class family. Dua works as a news reporter to support her not-supportive family. She marries into the wealthy family, and struggles to adjust with her in-laws.

== Cast ==
- Mikaal Zulfiqar as Shavez
- Zarnish Khan as Dua
- Ammara Butt as Soha
- Agha Mustafa Hassan as Faizan "faizi"
- Ayesha Sana as Salma
- Irfan Khoosat as Dua's father
- Ayesha Khan as Dua's mother
- Maryam Noor as Nida
- Munazzah Arif as Dua's aunt
- Sabeena Farooq as Zoha
- Zarmeena Ikram as Maria
- Aliha Chaudry as Aliha
- Hassan Mir as Faizan's friend
- Ramiz Siddiqui as Shayen
- Omair Rana
