= Meherbaan (TV series) =

- Genre: Family drama
- Written by: Sabika Zainab
- Directed by: Zulfiqar Haider
- Country of origin: Pakistan
- Original language: Urdu
- No. of seasons: 1
- No. of episodes: 36

Production
- Producer: Zulfiqar Haider
- Running time: Approx. 40 minutes

Original release
- Network: A Plus
- Release: 28 April – 29 December 2017

Meherbaan (English: Kind) (Urdu: مہربان) is a 2017 Pakistani drama serial that aired on A Plus Entertainment.

== Plot ==
It is a story of two sisters, Dua (Nimra Khan) and Mehru (Ammara Butt), with contrasting personalities. While Dua is the humble and down-to-earth, Mehru is arrogant and snobbish. She does not care about her house's humble condition. All she cares about is her beauty and her friends. She works at an office and does not care about her household responsibilities. The first issue their mother is having is regarding her daughters’ marriage proposals. Whenever someone comes to see Dua for marriage, they like the young and chirpy Mehru instead. Life is not as easy as it may seem for both girls in a relatively conservative household.

== Cast ==
- Nimra Khan as Dua
- Ammara Butt as Mehru
- Affan Waheed as Daaniyal
- Irfan Khoosat as Haji's: Dua and Mehru Father
- Asad Malik as Shah Nawaz
- Munazzah Arif as Ismat
- Raheela Agha as Nasreen: Haji's wife
- Jazib Akram as Asad
