= Fawad Jalal =

Pakistani actor

- Born: 25 October 1986 (age 39); Lahore, Pakistan
- Citizenship: Pakistan
- Education: Bachelor of Law (LLB), Masters in Business Administration (MBA)
- Occupation: Actor
- Years active: 2010–present

Fawad Jalal is a Pakistani actor. He made his film debut in the 2016 Urdu film Blind Love. Jalal is best known for his role as Laxman in the historical drama Dastaan (2010) and as Aazan in Aik Larki Aam Si (2018). He also acted in a comedy short film “Fruit Chaat” on YouTube Channel Disability. Fawad Jalal primarily works in Urdu television serials and films.

== Early life and education ==
Born in Lahore into a family of professionals, Jalal earned an MBA and also studied law, working with his father as a lawyer for a few years before becoming an actor.

== Career ==
His appearances include Dastaan, Dekho Chaand Aaya, Naik Parveen, Bilqees Kaur, Yeh Chahatein Yeh Shiddatein, Aik Aur Sitam Hai and Aik Larki Aam Si. In 2016, he made his film debut with a supporting role in Blind Love.

== Filmography ==
=== Film ===
Year	Title	Role
2016	Blind Love	Inspector

=== Television serials ===
Year	Title	Role	Network
2010	Dastaan	Laxman	Hum TV
2012	Bilqees Kaur	Hassan, Sultan's friend	Hum TV
2015	Dekho Chand Aaya	Hassan	Geo TV
2016	Manjdhaar		Geo TV
2016	Yeh Chahatein Yeh Shiddatein	Mohsin Ejaz	Geo TV
2016	Sakeena		A-Plus TV
2017	Kaneez	Fahad	A-Plus TV
2017	Sawera	Sawera's love interest	Geo TV
2017	Agar Tum Saath Ho	Faraz	Express Entertainment
2018	Naik Parveen	Rudab	Geo TV
2018	Aik Larki Aam Si	Aazan	Hum TV
2019	Ek Aur Sitam Hai	Fahad	A-Plus TV
2019	Nawabzadiyan		Express Entertainment
2020	Chalawa	Amir Ahmed Turk	Hum TV
2020	Soteli Maamta	Zubair	Hum TV
2021	Khuda Aur Muhabbat 3	Sajjad	Geo TV
2021	Yun Tu Hai Pyar Bohut	Sarwar	Hum TV
2021	Benaam	Arsalan	ARY Digital
2022	Haseena		A-Plus TV
2022	Wehem	Anwar Amin	Hum TV
2022	Bikhray Hain Hum		Hum TV
2022	Tere Bina Mein Nahi		ARY Digital
2023	Ehsaan Faramosh		ARY Digital
2023	Nijaat		Hum TV
2023	Working Women		Green Entertainment
2023	Gumn	Taimur	Green Entertainment
2023	Dooriyan		Hum TV

Bandhan Musafir
