= Asma Hadeed =

Pakistani politician

Member of the National Assembly of Pakistan
- In office 13 August 2018 – 20 January 2023
- Constituency: Reserved seat for women

Personal details
- Other political affiliations: PTI (2018-2023)
- Relatives: Ayesha Khan (daughter-in-law)

Asma Hadeed (Urdu: عاصمہ قدیر) is a Pakistani politician who had been a member of the National Assembly of Pakistan from August 2018 till January 2023.

== Political career ==
She was elected to the National Assembly of Pakistan as a candidate of Pakistan Tehreek-e-Insaf (PTI) on a reserved seat for women from Punjab in the 2018 Pakistani general election.

=== Resignation ===
In April 2022, she resigned from the National Assembly along with all Tehreek-e-Insaf members after the no confidence motion against PM Imran Khan.

== More Reading ==
- List of members of the 15th National Assembly of Pakistan
- List of Pakistan Tehreek-e-Insaf elected members (2013–2018)
- No-confidence motion against Imran Khan
