= Amin Iqbal =

Pakistani film director

- Born: Lahore, Pakistan
- Occupations: Director; Producer; Writer
- Years active: 2010–present
- Known for: Direction in TV
- Notable work: Dushman e Jaan (2020); Ishq-e-Laa (2021)

Amin Iqbal is a Pakistani television/film director and writer. He has directed several television series including Dil Muhallay Ki Haveli, Mannat and Deedan. His work as a director on Dushman e Jaan earned him a nomination for Best Television Director at the Pakistan International Screen Awards.

== Career ==
Iqbal started his career as a writer and director from Pakistan Television Network. He first directed and wrote the television series such as Bichre Ge Ab Kese, Dobara and Imtehaan. The first project of Iqbal which received positive response was Thakan which starred Saba Qamar, Tauqeer Nasir and Saba Hameed in leading roles and revolves around the issues of a working women in a patriarchal system. He then directed Teri Raah Main Rul Gai, Meri Dulari and Dil Muhallay Ki Haveli, all of which featured Yumna Zaidi and Sami Khan as a lead couple and earned him further recognition. Iqbal then directed three other projects for Geo Entertainment; Meri Zindagi Hai Tu, which revolves around the obsession of a girl with her aunt's fiancé, Mannat, a love story of a pressurised relationship and Dilfareb, love triangle themed penned by Zafar Mairaj which further established his career as a director.

In 2018, he directed Mohib Mirza and Sanam Saeed starrer Deedan which revolves around the love story of two individuals and was shot in the Hunza Valley. The series was praised for its aesthetics and visuals. His next project Dushman e Jaan met with reviews from critics and audience, earned him critical acclaim and became first critical success of his career. Iqbal's recently directed Ishq E Laa starring Sajal Aly, Yumna Zaidi and Azaan Sami Khan is currently airing on Hum TV.

== Filmography ==
- Rehbra

=== Television ===
Year	Title	Network	Notes
2010	Dobara	PTV Home	Writer also
2010	Bichre Ge Ab Kese	PTV Home	writer only
2011	Imtehaan	PTV Home	Writer only
2012	Thakan	ARY Digital	
2012	Teri Raah Main Rul Gai	Urdu 1	
2013	Meri Dulari	Geo Entertainment	
2013	Dil Mohallay Ki Haveli	Geo Entertainment	
2013	Meri Zindagi Hai Tu	Geo Entertainment	
2014	Uff Yeh Mohabbat	Geo Entertainment	
2015	Dilfareb	Geo Entertainment	
2015	Agar Ho Sakay To	Urdu 1	
2015	Maan	Hum TV	
2015	Khoat	ARY Digital	
2016	Mannat	Geo Entertainment	
2017	Begangi	A-Plus TV	
2018	Deedan	A-Plus TV	
2020	Dushman e Jaan	ARY Digital	
2021	Ishq E Laa	Hum TV	
2022	Wabaal	Hum TV	

== Awards and nominations ==
- Nominated - 2nd Pakistan International Screen Awards - Best Television Director - Dushman e Jaan
