= Saakin =

Band from Islamabad, Pakistan

- Origin: Islamabad, Pakistan
- Genres: Alternative rock Sufi music
- Members: Ibrahim Akram; Ali Hamdani; Usman Shakeel; Varqa Faraid; Parham Faraid

Saakin is a band from Islamabad, Pakistan. Formed in 2011, the group's line-up consists of drummer Ibrahim Akram, guitarist Ali Hamdani, vocalist Usman Shakeel, pianist Varqa Faraid and bass guitarist Parham Faraid. Saakin won the Lux Style Award for Best Emerging Talent in Music in 2019.

== Members ==
- Ibrahim Akram – drums
- Ali Hamdani – guitars
- Usman Shakeel – vocals
- Varqa Faraid – keyboards
- Parham Faraid – bass

== Discography ==
Singles

- Saqi-e-Bawafa (2018)
- Sik Mitraan (2019)
- Zindagi Tamasha (2019)
- Intebah (2021)
- Tanam (2024)

== Awards ==
In 2019, Saakin received the Lux Style Award for Best Emerging Talent in Music.
