= Ismat Iqbal =

Pakistani actress (b. 1965)

- Born: Ismat Iqbal; 26 September 1965 (age 60); Karachi, Sindh, Pakistan
- Education: University of Karachi
- Occupation: Actress
- Years active: 1977–1999; 2013–present

Ismat Iqbal (Urdu: عصمت اقبال) is a Pakistani television actress. She has appeared as child and later lead actress in classic serials aired on PTV Home during 1970-1990.

Currently, she is active in the television industry often playing the role of mother in serials airing on different networks. Her most recent appearance include Aik Larki Aam Si as Minhaj's mother and Ranjha Ranjha Kardi as Noori's mother.

She was introduced to Pakistan Television by director Bakhtiyar Ahmed.

== Selected television work ==
Year	Title	Network	Notes
	Coffee House	PTV Home	
	Faasley	PTV Home	
	Chakar-e-Azam	PTV Home	
	Zara Si Bhool	PTV Home	
	Haan Isi Mor Par	PTV Home	
	Bakht Nama	PTV Home	
	Baarish	PTV Home	
	Shikast-e-Aarzu	PTV Home	
	Aabgeeney	PTV Home	
	Aadhi Gawahi	PTV Home	
2013	Mere Hamrahi	Hum TV	as Humaira (Haniya's Mother)
2016	Piya Be Dardi	ARY Digital	
2016–2017	Socha Na Tha	ARY Zindagi	
2017	Zakham	ARY Digital	as Zeb (Takbeer's mother)
2016–2017	Waada	ARY Digital	as Nuzhat
2017	Sun Yaara	ARY Digital	as Saif's mother
2016–2017	Hatheli	Hum TV	as Samiya's mother
2017–2018	Karamat-e-Ishq	TV One	
2018–2019	Aik Larki Aam Si	Hum TV	as Minhaj's mother
2018–2019	Ranjha Ranjha Kardi	Hum TV	as Noori's mother
2019	Hania	ARY Digital	as Jameela, Hania's mother
2021	Dil Na Umeed Toh Nahi	TV One; PTV Home	as Allah Rakhi's grandmother
2021	Raqeeb Se	Hum TV	as Sakina's neighbor
2023	Jeevan Nagar	Green Entertainment	
