= Hum Sitaray =

Pakistani Entertainment TV Channel

Hum Sitaray ہم ستاره
- Official Logo of Hum Sitaray
- Country: Pakistan
- Broadcast area: Pakistan and Worldwide
- Network: Hum Network
- Headquarters: Karachi, Sindh, Pakistan

Programming
- Language: Urdu
- Picture format: (1080i, 16:9, MPEG-4, HDTV)

Ownership
- Owner: Duraid Qureshi; Sultana Siddiqui
- Sister channels: List: Hum Masala Style 360 Hum TV Hum Europe Hum News Hum Mena Hum Pashto 1 Ten Sports

History
- Launched: 14 December 2013; 12 years ago

Links
- Website: Official Website

Availability

Streaming media
- Hum Sitaray Live: Watch Live

Hum Sitaray is a Pakistani entertainment channel launched by Hum Network Limited on 14 December 2013. It is a major entertainment channel in Pakistan.

== History ==
The channel launched on 14 December 2013 with original programming - this had become a trend for Pakistani entertainment to have 2 channels under 1 company (ex. Geo Kahani, ARY Zindagi) but due to bad ratings, the channel turned to airing reruns from 2015 onwards with little original programming and since 2016 it has been airing only reruns from Hum TV. Hum Sitaray dubbed the entire Season 1 of the Turkish Historical Drama Dilliris Ertuğrul.

== Currently broadcast ==
=== Drama serials ===
- Chupke Chupke
- Tum Mere Kya Ho
- Bin Roye
- Phir Wohi Mohabbat
- Muhabbat Gumshuda Meri
- Zindagi Gulzar Hai

Humsafar Mere Meharban Laa Jethani Mausam

== Formerly broadcast ==
=== Original Programming ===
==== Comedy ====
- Ghundi

==== Dramas ====
- 100 Din Ki Kahani
- Madawa
- Neelam Kinaray
- Pardes
- Sawaab
- Ishq Zahe Naseeb
- Udaari
- Bin Roye
- Suno Chanda
- Jo Tu Chahey
- Ehd-e-Wafa
- Gul-e-Rana

==== Reality Shows/Talk Shows ====
- Challenger
- Tonite with HSY

=== Acquired Programming ===
==== India ====
- Taarak Mehta Ka Ooltah Chashmah
- Adaalat (TV series)
- Ajeeb Daastaan Hai Ye
- Jamai Raja
- Udaan
- Mission Sapne
- Comedy Classes

==== Turkey ====
- Dirilis

== Former programs ==
- Sitaray Ki Subha
- Tonight With HSY
