= The Reluctant Fundamentalist (soundtrack) =

The Reluctant Fundamentalist: Original Motion Picture Soundtrack

Soundtrack album by Michael Andrews
- Released: April 30, 2013
- Recorded: 2012–13
- Genres: Film soundtrack Classical
- Length: 42:29 minutes
- Label: Universal Music Group India
- Producer: Universal Music Group

Michael Andrews chronology
The Five-Year Engagement (2012)	The Reluctant Fundamentalist: Original Motion Picture Soundtrack (2013)	The Heat (2013)

Professional ratings
Review scores
Source	Rating
AllMusic	3/5 stars
Radio Mirchi Music Reviews	3/5 stars
Fight Club Reviews	4.5/5 stars
India Giltz Review	1/5 stars
MySwar Music	3/5 stars
Soundtrack	3/5 stars

The Reluctant Fundamentalist: Original Motion Picture Soundtrack is the film soundtrack to the film of the same name, originally composed, orchestrated and conducted by Michael Andrews.The soundtrack was released by Universal Music Group India in Asia and Internationally released by Knitting Factory under Universal rights on April 30, 2013.

The music is composed by Michael Andrews (Original film scorer & composer). Other composers include Amy Ray, Wazir Afzal, Fareed Ayaz & Abu Muhammad, Farhad Humayun, Mohsin Raza Khan, Atif Aslam, Amy Ray, Meesha Shafi, Rizzle Kicks, Ali Sethi, Zahra Haider Khan, Faiz Ahmed Faiz(lyrics), Hazeen Qadri, Javed Akhtar and Peter Gabriel (uncredited).

== Album information ==
Mira Nair, working with American composer Michael Andrews, layered the film's score with traditional Pakistani songs, Urdu poetry set to music, cutting-edge Pakistani pop, funk and rap, vocals from Amy Ray of folk group the Indigo Girls, and a new original song from Peter Gabriel, an old friend of Nair's. The first song includes Qawwali, a form of devotional Sufi music, sung by a family of 12 renowned Pakistani Qawwali singers, led by brothers Fareed Ayaz & Abu Muhammad, from Karachi.

For The Reluctant Fundamentalist, Pakistani modern funk was the inspiration of film director. The director discovered the new sounds of Pakistan on the Coca-Cola Company's Coke Studio, a hugely popular and influential Pakistani music TV series. It melds together legendary singers and younger musicians to re-imagine ancient songs with jazz and folk influences. Says Nair in an interview "It's not just fusion. There is a real depth to this amalgam" . "It's like nothing I have heard."

Film director chooses Faiz Ahmed poetry for her film in an interview she said: "The poems of the Pakistani poet laureate Faiz Ahmed Faiz, beloved by my father, have become the heart of many songs in the film", for the Pakistani songs Mira went to Pakistan and take Atif Aslam for her film, who is the biggest Pakistani pop star, Aslam sings in Urdu on two songs in the film: "Mori Araj Suno" featured in the scene Changez sails down the Bosphorus in Istanbul, and the Urdu vocals of Peter Gabriel's final song "Bol" Gabriel sings the English lyrics. For the Pakistani songs, the Los Angeles-based Andrews created the overlay of contemporary funk. Mira called him up from Delhi, and invited to India, Andrews began composing the near hour-long score, on which he plays everything almost entirely himself, except for the orchestral sequences, for folk songs mira consult with Pakistani folk musicians for instruments, in an interview Andrew explains: "She has great relationships with folks in the region, and because I was so far away, Mira took care of it. I sent her my music to be overdubbed with melodies represented and she actually recorded bansuri flute, and also took care of the vocal on “Mori Araj Suno.” Simultaneously, I added Alam Khan, Ali Akbar's son, and Salar Nader. Then I put the tracks under the vocal and the orchestra under the mockup and real bansuri.

Singer Atif Aslam and Music director Peter Gabriel performed one song from the Pakistani acclaimed movie Bol, Atif aslam re-composed it and sung Urdu vocals but English vocals and music was performed by gabriel, this song is not included in album soundtrack and goes uncredited for that due to the budget of film, this song is produced and financed by both musicians. However, in film song is there and highly praised by viewers as it has a flavour of both Pakistani-folk and American-folk.

== Release ==
In India and Pakistan the soundtrack was released by Universal Music Group of India, on April 30, 2012. Universal Music India, on 22 April 2013, announced that they obtained music rights to Mira Nair's upcoming movie 'The Reluctant Fundamentalist'. The film soundtrack gained generally positive reviews. Universal Music group of India's Managing Director Devraj Sanyal said on its release: "The Reluctant Fundamentalist eclectic mix of many world sounds is just what the new Indian consumer is looking for. I personally think songs like Bijli & Mori Araj are on their way to give commercial Bollywood cinema a run for its money. I'm looking to work with Mira & her very gifted crew to totally up the game for her movies, especially in the digital domains, where we are unqualified leaders, for many years to come." The album is available on both physical and digital formats on Universal Music.

Internationally it was released by Knitting Factory on same date. Upon its music release it gained generally positive reviews from Indian music websites.

== Content ==
Unlike most soundtrack albums from stage adaptations, this album does not contain all musical numbers in the film, songs like "Bum Phatta" performed and penned by Ali Azmat, "Scottish" by Robert Walter, Atif and Gabriel Bol song, two more songs, "Rich and well" Written By Jacques Slade, Lamar Van Sciver, and Frank Greenfield Performed By Jacques Slade Produced By Boss Beats and Deville of The Dentmakers and "No More Dues Aml" Written/produced by Jerry Kalaf Performed by This Side Up being omitted from the album.

On April 30, 2013, Universal Music and Knitting factory released featuring a total of 14 tracks in album. In the soundtrack album 5 songs are missing and go uncredited but in the movie all songs are added and featured.

== Track listing ==
All lyrics are written by Faiz Ahmed Faiz, Farhad Humayun, Amy Ray, Javed Akhtar, Peter Gabriel and Hazeen Qadri; all music is composed by Michael Andrews (musician) with various other Artists.

No.	Title	Artist(s)	Length
1.	"Kangna"	Fareed Ayaz & Abu Muhammad	5:27
2.	"Bijli Aaye Ya Na Aaye"	Meesha Shafi	3:08
3.	"Kaindey Ney"	Zahra Haider Khan	3:25
4.	"Dil Jalaane Ki Baat"	Ali Sethi	1:42
5.	"Mori Araj Suno"	Atif Aslam	3:11
6.	"Measure of Me"	Amy Ray	5:54
7.	"A Young Man Has To Take a Stand"	Michael Andrews	1:06
8.	"Janissary"	Michael Andrews	1:41
9.	"Something Happened"	Michael Andrews	3:38
10.	"God Bless America"	Michael Andrews	0:49
11.	"Love In Urdu"	Rizzle Kicks	2:02
12.	"Focus On the Fundamentals"	Michael Andrews	2:02
13.	"Get Us Both Killed"	Michael Andrews	4:28
14.	"Too Much Blood Has Poured Into This Rivar"	Michael Andrews	3:54

== Commercial performance ==
The music from the movie was not hit on the board and remain uncredited from any professional music chart sites and boards, due to Pakistani and Indian touches in the album the music is immensely famous in Pakistan as it features 3 major classic hits of the Pakistani music Industry.

== Album credits ==
Backing Music:

- Music Editor: Manish Raval
- Sound Engineer: Jamal Rehman
- String Conductance: Dave Connor
- Recording studio: True Brew Records

Personnel:

- Recording & Mixing: Steve Kaye (Elgonix Labs), Glendale (CA)
- Vocal percussion: Salar Nader
- Additional Percussions: Davy Chegwidden
- Keyboard: Robert Walter
- Winds & Flutes: Ashwin Srinivasan
- Harmonium: Ustad Habib
- Tabla: Ustad Jharri
- Drums: Kami Paul
- Guitars: Jamal Rahman, Atif Aslam
- Bass: Sameer Ahmed

== See also ==
- Pakistani folk music
- Music of Pakistan
- Indian folk music
