= Huma Hameed =

Pakistani actress (born 1959)

- هما حمید
- Born: Huma Hameed Akhtar; 10 December 1959 (age 66); Lahore, Pakistan
- Other name: Audrey Hepburn of Pakistan
- Education: Lahore College for Women University
- Occupation: Actress
- Years active: 1976–present
- Children: 3
- Parent: Hameed Akhtar (father)
- Relatives: Saba Hameed (sister); Waseem Abbas (brother-in-law); Agha Sikandar (cousin); Faris Shafi (nephew); Meesha Shafi (niece)

Huma Hameed is a Pakistani actress. She was also known as Audrey Hepburn of Pakistan due to her sophisticated and independent strong roles in dramas. She is known for her roles in dramas Takkay Ki Ayegi Baraat, Tum Mere Hi Rehna, Zid, Annie Ki Ayegi Baraat and Jaisay Aapki Marzi.

== Early life and education ==
Huma was born in Lahore, Pakistan, to writer and columnist Hameed Akhtar and Saadia, a film producer. She completed her education from Lahore College for Women University. Her siblings include sisters Saba and Lalarukh, who are also actresses, and a brother.

== Career ==
She started working at PTV Lahore Centre. She worked in drama Koel with Rahat Kazmi and later in Aur Drames which was written by Ashfaq Ahmed.

In 1983, she worked in drama Roshni with Asif Raza Mir and Farooq Zameer written by Haseena Moin and then she worked in drama Shikayatain Hakayatain with Qavi Khan and Zaib Rehman.

After she got married she moved to Toronto, Canada, but continued to work in dramas.

In 2011, she worked in drama Takkay Ki Ayegi Baraat and later Annie Ki Ayegi Baraat the dramas were directed by Marina Khan.

In 2014, she worked in drama Tum Mere Hi Rehna on Hum TV with her sister Saba Hameed, Waseem Abbas, Kiran Haq and Mikaal Zulfiqar. In 2019 she worked in drama Zid starring with her nephew Faris Shafi, Shaista Jabeen, Muneeb Butt, Shehryar Zaidi and Saba Faisal on Express Entertainment which was directed by Owais Khan and written by Samira Faza. She portrayed the role of Sabeera, a widowed businesswoman who takes care of her teenaged children but has a difficult time expressing her feelings to them which causes a rift and distance between them.

In 2023, she appeared in drama Jaisay Aapki Marzi on ARY Digital along with Durefishan Saleem, Mikaal Zulfiqar, Kiran Malik, Jawed Sheikh, Hira Umer and Ali Tahir which was directed by her sister Saba Hameed and written by Naila Zehra Jafri. She did the role of Shagufta a kind and loving mother of Aleezay.

== Personal life ==
Huma is married and lives with her husband at Canada. Huma has three children and her father Hameed Akhtar was a writer also her sisters Saba Hameed and Lalarukh Hameed are actresses.

== Filmography ==
=== Television ===
Year	Title	Role	Network
1978	Koel	Sofia	PTV
1979	Dard Aur Darmaan	Huma	PTV
1979	Alif Laila	Shehzadi Sahiba	PTV
1980	Aur Drame	Zubaida	PTV
1981	Chabi Aur Chabiyan	Pushkla	PTV
1982	Drama 82	Maria	PTV
1982	Aisi Bulandi Aisi Pasti	Tayyaba	PTV
1983	Maikay Ka Bakra	Naveen	PTV
1983	Roshni	Nida	PTV
1983	Shikayatain Hakayatain	Sajida	PTV
1984	Sanwal Mor Moharan	Naila Ejaz	PTV
1984	Mirza and Sons	Shireen	PTV
1985	Maya Aur Monsoon	Sara	PTV
1986	Show Time	Herself	PTV
1987	Drama 87	Hina	PTV
1988	Kahani No: 6	Najma	PTV
1989	Drama 89	Seemi	PTV
1990	Kahani No: 10	Maryam	PTV
2011	Takkay Ki Ayegi Baraat	Arfa	Geo TV
2012	Annie Ki Ayegi Baraat	Arfa	Geo Entertainment
2014	Tum Mere Hi Rehna	Raheela	Hum TV
2017	The Celebrity Lounge Season 2	Herself	PTV
2019	Zid	Sabeera	Express Entertainment
2023	Jaisay Aapki Marzi	Shagufta	ARY Digital
