= Exit West =

2017 novel by British-Pakistani author Mohsin Hamid

- First edition (UK)
- Author: Mohsin Hamid
- Audio read by: Mohsin Hamid
- Language: English
- Publisher: Hamish Hamilton (UK); Riverhead Books (US)
- Publication date: March 2017
- Publication place: United States
- Pages: 229
- Awards: Los Angeles Times Book Prize for Fiction, Aspen Words Literary Prize
- ISBN: 978-0735212206
- OCLC: 1014146826

Exit West is a 2017 novel by British-Pakistani author Mohsin Hamid. The novel, which can be considered fantasy or speculative fiction, is about a young couple, Saeed and Nadia, who live in an unnamed city undergoing civil war and finally have to flee, using a system of magical doors that lead to different locations around the globe. The main themes of the novel are emigration and refugee problems.

Scholars have analyzed Exit West for its suggestions about global politics, use of technology, and calls for better treatment of the environment.

Exit West won Los Angeles Times Book Prize for Fiction (2017) and Aspen Words Literary Prize (2018) and was shortlisted for a number of other awards.

== Plot ==
Nadia and Saeed meet when they are working students in an unnamed city. Saeed is more conservative and still lives at home, as custom generally requires, but the more independent Nadia has chosen to live alone and has been disowned by her parents for doing so. Saeed and Nadia meet and eventually fall in love. After Saeed's mother is killed by a stray bullet while searching for a lost earring in her car, Nadia moves in with Saeed and his father, despite not wanting to marry Saeed as propriety requires.

As the militants successfully wrest control of the city from the government and violence becomes an every day part of life, Nadia and Saeed begin chasing rumours that there are doors in the city that serve as portals to other locations. Although most of the doors are guarded by militants, they manage to bribe their way through a door, leaving behind Saeed's father who does not wish to be a burden to them and asks Nadia to promise him never to leave Saeed until they are settled.

The door they go through takes them to Mykonos, where they are among many refugees and settle in a tent city. They eventually obtain the compassion of a local Greek girl who has a rapport with Nadia and helps the two go through a recently discovered door which leads to a luxury home in London. Nadia and Saeed and other migrants settle in the home, claiming it from its owners.

As more migrants penetrate London, hostility between the migrants and the native-born increases, including attacks and mob rule. The migrants are eventually sectioned off in a ghetto with minimal food and electricity called "Dark London." After a raid to clear out migrants goes wrong, the natives decide to try to work together with the new migrants and put them to work clearing the land for Halo London, a city surrounding London-proper, with the promise that they will be given 40 meters and a pipe i.e. a small plot of land and access to utilities. Nadia and Saeed throw themselves into the work as they feel themselves growing apart from each other.

Although the couple are on a list that puts them among the first to obtain a secure home, Nadia asks Saeed to leave through another portal and they eventually take their chance arriving in Marin County, California. They find they are generally welcome there and Nadia finds work at a food co-op while Saeed becomes more and more religious. Eventually, realizing that they no longer have any feelings for one another, Nadia leaves Saeed and moves into a room at the co-op, forming a relationship with a cook who works there. Saeed, meanwhile, marries the native-born daughter of a preacher.

Fifty years later, Nadia returns to the country of her birth and meets up with Saeed, who offers to one day take her to see the stars in Chile.

== Background ==
Since 2010, Hamid has emerged as an author known for writing fiction that explores alternate ways of global living and emphasizes the disadvantages of being born in a third-world country. Hamid wrote Moth Smoke (2000), The Reluctant Fundamentalist (2007), How to Get Filthy Rich in Rising Asia (2013), and then Exit West in 2017. All four stories focus on the experiences and journeys of characters originally from Pakistan.

Written within the era of Trump and Brexit, Mohsin Hamid wrote Exit West as a way for readers to look at the refugee crisis from a different perspective. Hamid explains that borders for countries are extremely “unnatural” and the issue with migrants and refugees is that their movement is thought of as a problem that needs to be solved. Hamid believes that refugees and migrants, or anyone for that matter, should be able to travel freely throughout the world. Hamid also explains that reading can help people see things from a different perspective, which means that people can become more cognizant of others’ situations and see solutions they never thought possible before. Hamid wrote Exit West to broaden people’s thoughts about the refugee crisis. He wanted to give readers an alternative perspective on how the people could operate in one world instead of one nation. With the election of Donald Trump in 2016 and his strict border policies, Hamid is trying to show readers that a world without borders is not only possible, but desirable.

== Reception ==
=== Reviews ===
Omar El Akkad in The Globe and Mail calls the novel "a masterpiece of humanity and restraint." Sarah Begley of Time magazine praised its relation to the ongoing Syrian refugee crisis and making a love story of refugees nevertheless feel universal. The Guardian defined it as a "magical vision of the refugee crisis." In December 2017, former U.S. President Barack Obama included Exit West in his list of the best books he read in 2017. Writing in The New Yorker, Jia Tolentino described how "the novel feels immediately canonical, so firm and unerring is Hamid’s understanding of our time and its most pressing questions."

Paste's Jeff Milo wrote that the hope of Saeed and Nadia "is kindled by rumors of mysterious doorways that transport people to undetermined locations. These doors have supernatural powers, but the way Hamid weaves his story, you’ll believe that they’re real." The Harvard Crimson's Caroline E. Tew wrote, "Although it’s a short, slim book, “Exit West” packs a punch. [...] Hamid has carefully constructed a situation that poignantly accentuates the trials and tribulations of refugees." Leah Greenblatt, writing for Entertainment Weekly, stated, "Hamid’s spare parable [...] took the sobering reality of a global refugee crisis to the most fantastical realm of fiction, and somehow made it all feel even more true."

In the article entitled "Mohsin Hamid’s Exit West: Co-Opting Refugees into Global Capitalism," Sercan Hamza Bağlama (2019) focuses on the depoliticisation of the refugee 'crisis' and analyses the social, cultural and economic interpellation of the refugee characters into the dominant system in a western country, saying [The depoliticisation of the refugee 'crisis'] justifies the binary paradigms of the orientalist mind-set as the dichotomy of 'them' and 'us' is constructed upon the artificial binary opposition between the Orient and the Occident, leading the West to take its 'historical' responsibility, export democracy, bring order and ironically help those in a desperate situation."

While Exit West received astonishing reviews, it does still have some critiques. Some scholars believe the idea of considering all humans on Earth as refugees is “wrong-headed.”

=== Awards and honors ===
Exit West was a New York Times best seller, and many outlets included the book in "best of" lists. Kirkus Reviews, Shelf Awareness, TIME, and Tor.com named it one of the top ten novels of 2017, whereas Entertainment Weekly, The Harvard Crimson, Literary Hub, and Paste included it in their lists of the best books of the decade. In 2024, the New York Times ranked it as #75 in their 100 best books of the 21st century.

Awards for Exit West
Year	Award	Result	Ref.
2017	Booker Prize	Shortlist	
2017	Booklist Editors' Choice: Adult Books	Selection	
2017	Brooklyn Public Library Literary Prize	Shortlist	
2017	Goodreads Choice Award for Fiction	Finalist	
2017	Los Angeles Times Book Prize for Fiction	Winner	
2017	Kirkus Prize	Finalist	
2017	National Book Critics Circle Award for Fiction	Finalist	
2017	St. Francis College Literary Prize	Shortlist	
2018	ALA Notable Books: Fiction	Selection	
2018	Andrew Carnegie Medal for Fiction	Longlist	
2018	Aspen Words Literary Prize	Winner	
2018	BSFA Award for Best Novel	Shortlist	
2018	Dayton Literary Peace Prize for Fiction	Finalist	
2018	Rathbones Folio Prize	Shortlist	
2019	International Dublin Literary Award	Shortlist	

== Analysis ==
Exit West attracted much attention from scholars and readers because the novel deals so closely with current events and problematic social norms. Scholars argue that Hamid is questioning the trending opinions of border security with Brexit and Trump, emphasizes the fake sense of connection to refugees through technology, and stresses the importance of preserving the global environment.

Hamid uses fiction to create a reality for readers to reconsider the “relationship between history and geography” with the use of “magical portals that allow instant access to destinations around the world”. In the story, it is clear that Hamid does not support the current ideology of going backwards in the direction of past policies and “greatness” (Trump's campaign). Mohsin uses fictional novels to reach readers because he wants them to be creative and progressive in their ideas for solutions to current events. This will allow readers to consider the possibility of a “global migration” and “borderless world”, which essentially is the plot of Exit West. Hamid helps readers empathize to refugees through the unfair experiences of the characters Nadia and Saeed. Hamid wraps the novel up with a positive ending to help convey the idea that readers shouldn’t think of refugees as a problem, but more of an opportunity for an improved world.

Throughout Exit West, Hamid also examines the use of digital technology and how it provides people with a false sense of connectedness. Characters use tablets to remain connected to people and places throughout the world, thus failing to truly be present with the people physically around them and the places they’re in. However, the characters are also using technology to photograph, document, and share the injustice happening in the country they are from. Hamid shows readers how technology can be used to positively connect with people and places they would otherwise not be connected to while also depicting how technology can weaken relationships and make people disconnected from each other.

Similar to some of Hamid's previous novels, Exit West also hints at the importance of changing global habits and creating a cleaner environment around the world. Hamid does this by emphasizing natural beauties throughout the novel and showing readers how when people have a choice and appreciation for where they live, they treat the environment with more respect.

== Adaptations ==
In August 2017, it was announced that the Russo brothers had purchased the rights to adapt the novel and will serve as producers, while Morten Tyldum hired as director. In March 2020, Michelle and Barack Obama came on board as producers, with Riz Ahmed playing Saeed and Yann Demange set to direct. The film was also set to be produced by Higher Ground Productions and distributed by Netflix. Joe Russo stated in an April interview that production on the film could begin soon at the time, but that depended on the COVID-19 pandemic and how film productions could commence during that time. In an August 2022 interview, the novel's author Mohsin Hamid stated the film was still in the development stage.
