= Mahmood Rahman =

Mahmood Rahman محمود الرحمن
- Born: Mahmood Rahman; 22 August 1982 (age 43); Lahore, Punjab, Pakistan
- Origin: Pakistan
- Occupation: Musician
- Instruments: Vocals, lyrics

Mahmood Rahman (Urdu: محمود الرحمن; born 22 August 1982) is a Pakistani guitarist and former member of the Lahore-based rock band Overload.

== Personal life ==
His paternal grandfather is Justice S. A. Rahman (d. 1990), a judge associated with the Pakistan Movement and who served as the 5th Chief Justice of Pakistan in 1968. His father, Asad Rahman (d. 2012), a journalist and human rights activist, was also a guerrilla commander in Balochistan who has been named Chakar Khan by the local peoples for his contributions, while his mother, Tanvir Rahman, is an artist and film producer.

Through his father, his uncle is Rashid Rehman, a journalist who has been the editor of Daily Times, who's the father of musician and leftist intellectual Taimur Rahman.

Rahman is married to actress-singer Meesha Shafi, daughter of actress Saba Hameed and sister of actor-singer Faris Shafi.

== Career ==
Rahman started his career as a guitarist with Atif Aslam in 2003, played guitar for his two No. 1 albums Jal Pari and Meri Kahani. He later parted ways amicably with Atif Aslam and went on to join Overload. His first and only album with Overload was Pichal Pairee. He has also composed and produced the lead single from the soundtrack of The Reluctant Fundamentalist, Dhol Bajay Ga. He hss also worked with Noori, and is currently playing with Meesha Shafi and Ali Azmat

== Discography ==
Year	Title	Notes
2004	Jal Pari	As a Guitarist
2008	Meri Kahani	As a Guitarist
2009	Pichal Pairee	Video album
2012	The Reluctant Fundamentalist	As a composer and producer
