= Bas Tera Saath Ho =

- Title screen
- Genre: Family Drama; Family Dynamics; Romantic
- Written by: Saira Raza
- Directed by: Qasim Ali Mureed
- Starring: Sana Javed; Farhan Saeed; Faran Tahir
- Country of origin: Pakistan
- Original language: Urdu
- No. of seasons: 1
- No. of episodes: 45

Production
- Executive producer: Salman Iqbal
- Producers: Humayun Saeed; Samina Humayun Saeed; Sana Shahnawaz; Nadeem Baig
- Cinematography: Asif Khan
- Editors: Zafar Ali Sodhar; Osama Imtiaz; Ajmal Abbasi; Mohsin Ali
- Running time: 37–40 minutes
- Production companies: Six Sigma Plus Production; Next Level Entertainment

Original release
- Network: ARY Digital
- Release: 4 May – 5 October 2026

Bas Tera Saath Ho is a 2026 Pakistani romantic drama television series produced by Humayun Saeed, Samina Humayun Saeed, Sana Shahnawaz and Nadeem Baig under the banner Six Sigma Plus Production and Next Level Entertainment. Directed by Qasim Ali Mureed and written by Saira Raza, it aired from 4 May 2026 on ARY Digital. It stars Farhan Saeed and Sana Javed as leads along with Saba Hameed, Salman Shahid, Haris Waheed, Zoya Nasir, Faran Tahir and Rizwan Ali Jaffri in supporting roles.

== Cast ==
- Farhan Saeed as Anas
- Sana Javed as Ansa
- Zoya Nasir as Shareen
- Saba Hameed as Tayi Jaan
- Salman Shahid
- Haris Waheed
- Rizwan Ali Jaffri
- Faran Tahir
- Shagufta Ejaz
- Tipu Sharif
- Aliya Ali
- Syed Mohammad Ahmed
- Sabrina Naqvi
- Hammad Sheikh Kashmiri

== Reception ==
=== Critical response ===
Fizza Abbas of Dawn Images praised the TV drama for its realistic portrayal of family dynamics and grounded characters and commended Saira Raza's script and Qasim Ali Mureed's direction for avoiding melodramatic tropes, while praising the cast's nuanced performances despite minor plot flaws. Shiraz Aslam of Youlin Magazine, praised the TV series for subverting traditional drama tropes by exploring domestic abuse without gender bias. He commended Farhan Saeed and Sana Javed for their performances as protagonists navigating psychological exploitation and inheritance disputes. Iqra Ejaz of 24 News HD, praised the series for its strong execution, Asif Khan's cinematography, and Farhan Saeed's compelling portrayal of a male victim of domestic oppression. She commended Sana Javed's bold performance and highlighted the drama's potential to draw attention to men's mental health issues.
