= Overload (Overload album) =

Studio album by Overload
- Released: December 2, 2006
- Recorded: 2005–2006 at Riot Studios in Lahore, Pakistan
- Genre: Instrumental rock Psychedelic rock Fusion
- Length: 65:14
- Label: BMN Records
- Producer: Farhad Humayun, Sarmad Abdul Ghafoor

Overload chronology
Overload (2006)	Pichal Pairee (2009)

Singles from Overload
- 1. "Cursed" Released: 2005; 2. "Storm" Released: 2006; 3. "Dhamaal" Released: 2007

Professional ratings
Review scores
Source	Rating
Pakistani Music Channel	4.0/5 stars

Overload is the debut album by the Pakistani rock band Overload, released in 2006. Singles from their debut album were "Cursed", "Storm" and "Dhamaal".

Dhamaal was nominated for the Best Video Award at the Lux Style Awards 2008.

== Track listing ==
All music arranged & composed by Sheraz Siddiq, Farhad Humayun and Hassan Mohyeddin.

Overload
No.	Title	Length
1.	"Only"	5:25
2.	"Cursed"	8:10
3.	"Days Gone By"	17:12
4.	"Mahiya Ve"	5:10
5.	"Wearing Out"	5:42
6.	"Storm"	7:56
7.	"Teen Taal"	8:52
8.	"Dhamaal"	6:47

== Personnel ==
Overload

- Farhad Humayun - drums
- Sheraz Siddiq - keyboards
- Hassan Mohyeddin - percussions
- Pappu Sain - dhol
- Jhura Sain - dhol

Additional musicians

- Vocals on "Mahiya Ve" by Shafqat Amanat Ali
- Guitars on "Wearing Out" by Assad Jamil
- Nakara played by Mureed Hussain

Production

- Produced by Farhad Humayun
- Co - Produced by Sarmad Ghafoor
- Recorded & Mixed at Riot Studios, Lahore, Punjab
