= Nimmi Nimmi =

- Nimmi Nimmi song official cover

Single by Overload
- Released: November 24, 2014
- Recorded: 2014
- Genre: Pop; Pakistani
- Length: 5:26
- Label: Riot Records
- Songwriter(s): Farhad Humayun
- Producer(s): Farhad Humayun; Sheraz Siddiq

Overload singles chronology
| "Jeet" (2013) | "Nimmi Nimmi" (2014) | "Bolo Na" (2015) |

Music video
- "Nimmi Nimmi" on YouTube

"Nimmi Nimmi" (Punjabi: نمی نمی ; lit: Moist) is a 2014 single by the Pakistani rock band Overload. It was released on November 24, 2014, in Pakistan as a digital download, Regarded as a most awaited released by band, it is their first single after almost a year. "Nimmi Nimmi" is a soulful-love ballad in which male protagonist vows to his lover with her memories after being left alone. The song is written, directed and produced by Farhad while Sheraz serves as a co-producer and synthesizer.

== About the song ==
The song is written, directed and produced by Farhad, while co-produced by Sheraz. Farhad describing their inspiration behind the song as "All my work is reflective of myself, feelings matter more to me than thoughts. So when I think of visuals I’m conscious of how an image makes me feel rather than what I think of it." he further expressed, "I have always been extremely observant of my surroundings and tried capturing feelings more than thoughts. My videos are a collage of visuals that I like to picture in my head. The song Nimmi Nimmi came together on its own. The music and words seemed to find their way together at the studio when Sheraz (Keyboardist of Overload) played some chords casually on the piano. Overload has always been my outlet to express my feelings without caring about whatever rules or trends the music industry is following."

== Music video ==
=== Synopsis ===
Video depicts a man who possessed all worldly pleasures but still senses a void caused by parting from his lover. Male protagonist is living with all luxuries of life but still has a whole place missing in him, when he look around in his house, he sees her in every place she had been, he vows for her comeback and desperately is in love with her.

=== Cast and Crew ===
Following is the list of brief artist that work with this record:

- Singer: Farhad Humayun
- Featuring Artist: Farhad Humayun and Shahbano
- Lyricist: Raheel Joseph, Farhad Humayun and Tahir Shaheer
- Music video director: Farhad Humayun
- Record Producers: Farhad Humayun and Sheraz Siddiq
- Record Label: Riot Studios

Personnel

- Composer: Farhad Humayun and Sheraz Siddiq
- Audio mastering: Frank Arkwright
- Guitarist: Sarmad Ghafoor
- Bass: Farhan Ali
- Keyboards: Sheraz Siddiq
- Dhol: Nasair Sain

== Track listing ==
- Digital download (2014 version)

"Nimmi Nimmi" featuring Farhad Humayun and Shah bano — 5:26

== Reception ==
With its release it tops the chart, After its release on digital media, song was listened by 4,000 SoundCloud with 35,607 views and gets 1300 shares on Facebook within less than 24 hours.

== Accolades ==
The single receives following nomination at 2015 Hum Awards:

| Year | Award | Category | Recipient(s) | Result |
|---|---|---|---|---|
| 2015 | 3rd Hum Awards | Best Solo Single | Farhad Humayun | Nominated |

== See also ==
- "Shikva" by Faakhir
- "Roiyaan" by Farhan Saeed
