= Neeli Zinda Hai =

Pakistani horror drama series

- Genre: Horror drama Mystery; Thriller; Supernatural
- Written by: Adeel Razzaq
- Directed by: Qasim Ali Mureed
- Starring: Sonia Mishal; Mohib Mirza; Urwa Hocane
- Country of origin: Pakistan
- Original language: Urdu
- No. of episodes: 39

Production
- Producers: Humayun Saeed; Shahzad Nasib
- Camera setup: Multi-camera setup
- Production company: Six Sigma Plus

Original release
- Network: ARY Digital
- Release: 20 May – 23 December 2021

Neeli Zinda Hai (Urdu: نیلی زندہ ہے, lit. 'Neeli is Alive') is a Pakistani supernatural horror drama series, directed by Qasim Ali Mureed, and written by Adeel Razzaq. It features Urwa Hocane in the titular role of a vengeful ghost with Mohib Mirza, and Sonia Mishal in lead roles. It premiered on ARY Digital on 20 May 2021.

== Plot ==
The story revolves around a married couple, Aman and Sumbul, who are trying to make up for lost time and love. Life keeps becoming difficult for Sumbul after a stillborn birth, an empty marriage, black magic by a broken mother-in-law, and a mute daughter named Minaal. After moving into a new house, the family starts to experience certain paranormal activities. Sumbul hires a maid for housework, and even the maid experiences the paranormal happenings. Aman refuses to believe in supernatural forces, which leaves Sumbul to deal with her issues on her own. The broken family tries to get closer to each other but grows further apart due to Neeli and her actions.

== Cast ==
- Urwa Hocane as Neeli Pervaiz (Spirit)
- Sonia Mishal as Sumbul Aman Faheem
- Mohib Mirza as Aman Faheem
- Osama Tahir as Pervaiz
- Kinza Malik as Meharbano Faheem
- Tahir Jatoi as Dilawar
- Jinaan Hussain as Nagina Servant
- Aliya Ali as Aliya Faheem sister of Aman
- Tahreem Ali Hameed as Minaal/Manu Aman
- Mohammad Ahmed as Faheem
- Hina Rizvi as Shaista Nawab
- Agha Mustafa Hassan as Nawab
- Shamim Hilaly as Pervaiz's mother
- Saba Faisal as Neeli's mother
- Rashid Farooqui as Neeli's father
- Imam Syed as Mr Alam friend of Faheem
