= Hameed Akhtar =

Pakistani newspaper columnist (1923–2011)

- Born: Akhtar Ali; 12 March 1923; Ludhiana, British India
- Died: 17 October 2011; Lahore, Punjab, Pakistan
- Occupations: Journalist, writer
- Known for: Journalism, column writing
- Children: Saba Hameed (daughter); Huma Hameed (daughter); Lalarukh Hameed (daughter)
- Relatives: Waseem Abbas (son-in-law); Faris Shafi (grandson); Meesha Shafi (granddaughter); Ali Abbas (grandson)
- Awards: Pride of Performance (2010)

Hameed Akhtar (12 March 1923 – 17 October 2011) was a newspaper columnist, writer, journalist, and secretary-general of the Progressive Writers Association in Pakistan. He was the father of television actresses Saba Hameed, Huma Hameed, and Lalarukh Hameed.

== Early life ==
Hameed Akhtar was born on 12 March 1923 in Ludhiana, British India, as Akhtar Ali. He received his early education in Ludhiana, where he was a childhood friend of the poets Sahir Ludhianvi and Ibn-e-Insha. He changed his name to Hameed Akhtar during his school years. Following the partition of British India, his family migrated to Pakistan.

== Career ==
After the independence of Pakistan in August 1947, Hameed Akhtar joined the Urdu-language newspaper Daily Imroze in Lahore in 1948, eventually rising to the position of editor. In 1970, he co-founded the Urdu-language daily Azad alongside fellow journalists Abdullah Malik and I. A. Rehman.

Hameed Akhtar was a widely respected columnist and contributed to numerous newspapers throughout his career, most recently to Daily Express. Over the course of his career he was personally acquainted with some of the most prominent literary figures of the subcontinent, including Faiz Ahmad Faiz, Munnu Bhai, Hafeez Jalandhri, Ismat Chughtai, Patras Bokhari, Saadat Hasan Manto, Kaifi Azmi, Krishan Chander, and Jan Nisar Akhtar.

Writer Intizar Hussain described Hameed Akhtar as a chronicler of the Progressive Writers Movement who worked relentlessly for progressive causes, including the pursuit of equality, and whose lifetime contributions are of lasting value.

== Awards and recognition ==
- Pride of Performance Award, conferred by the President of Pakistan on 14 August 2009

== Works ==
=== Books ===
- Aashnaayian Kia Kia
- Kaal Kothri (a memoir of his time in prison)
- Royedad-e-Anjuman

=== Film scripts ===
- Sukh Ka Sapna (1962)
- Paraaye Aag (1971)

== Death and legacy ==
Hameed Akhtar died on 17 October 2011 in Lahore after a prolonged illness. He was 88 years old. He was survived by his wife, three daughters, and one son.

His daughter Saba Hameed was first married to Syed Pervaiz Shafi, with whom she had two children: actress Meesha Shafi and musician Faris Shafi. She subsequently married actor Waseem Abbas; their son Ali Abbas is also an actor.

Following his death, veteran journalist and human rights activist I. A. Rehman described him as an enlightened person, an excellent journalist, a gifted short story writer, and a filmmaker.
