= Qasim Ali Mureed =

Pakistani director

- Born: Lahore, Pakistan
- Occupations: Television cinematographer; Television director; Film Director
- Years active: 2010s-present
- Spouse: Sadia Jabbar

Qasim Ali Mureed is a Pakistani television and film director, cinematographer and editor. He is best known for his work as a director in Urdu television. He made his cinematic directorial debut in 2022 with Tich Button. His accolades include a nomination of Lux Style Award for Best TV Director.

== Personal life ==
He married film and television producer Sadia Jabbar in February 2021.

== Career ==
He made his directorial debut with Be Inteha. His other works include Hania (TV series), Neeli Zinda Hai, Mere Humsafar (TV series) and Aangan (2017 TV series). His direction of Aangan was praised critically, with DAWN Images stated that he has woven the story together with a quite charm and simplicity. His feature film directorial debut Tich Button released in November 2022 and became a box office success. He also directed Aye Ishq e Junoon, a romantic, thriller Pakistani television series, written by Sadia Akhter and produced by Six Sigma Plus Productions that aired from November 11, 2024, to March 10, 2025, on ARY Digital, starring Sheheryar Munawar and Ushna Shah in the lead roles. The final episode of the series was broadcast on March 10, 2025.

== Filmography ==
- Tich Button

== Television ==
| Year | Title | Notes |
|---|---|---|
| 2017 | Aangan | |
| 2019 | Hania | |
| 2020–21 | Prem Gali | |
| 2021 | Neeli Zinda Hai | |
| 2021–22 | Mere Humsafar | |
| 2022-23 | Meri Shehzadi | |
| 2024 | Jaan-e-Jahan | |
| 2026 | Bas Tera Saath Ho | |

== Awards and nominations ==
| Year | Nominee / work | Award | Result |
|---|---|---|---|
| 2018 | Aangan | Lux Style Award for Best Television Director | Nominated |
