= Jaisay Aapki Marzi =

Pakistani television series

- Genre: Family
- Written by: Naila Zehra Jafri
- Directed by: Saba Hameed
- Starring: Durefishan Saleem; Mikaal Zulfiqar; Kiran Malik; Hira Umer
- Country of origin: Pakistan
- Original language: Urdu
- No. of episodes: 35

Production
- Producer: Six Sigma Plus Production
- Editor: Zafar Ali Sodhar
- Camera setup: Multi-camera setup

Original release
- Network: ARY Digital
- Release: 23 August – 26 December 2023

Jaisay Aapki Marzi (Urdu: جیسے آپ کی مرضی, lit. 'As you wish') is a Pakistani drama series that premiered on ARY Digital on 23 August in 2023. Directed by Saba Hameed and written by Naila Zehra Jafri, it is a production of Six Sigma Plus Production. It stars Durefishan Saleem and Mikaal Zulfiqar as leads along with Hira Umer, Kiran Malik, Huma Hameed, and Ali Tahir in major supporting roles.

== Synopsis ==
Aleezay wants a good career and wants to live her way but after she is pressured by her parents to marry Sheheryar she agrees to it. Following a newly married couple, the female lead is in for a rude shock when she discovers she has married into a family of abusive clinical narcissists.

== Cast ==
- Durefishan Saleem as Alizay
- Mikaal Zulfiqar as Shahryar
- Kiran Malik as Natasha
- Hira Umer as Ramza
- Huma Hameed as Shagufta
- Ali Tahir as Ehtasham
- Jawed Sheikh as Hamdani
- Danial Afzal Khan as Raza
- Mashal Khan as Natalia
- Birjees Farooqui as Natalia's mother
- Komail Anam as Ahmer; Ramza's husband
- Ali Kureshi as Salman
- Fareeda Shabbir as Mrs. Afzar
- Ali Safina as Meerab
- Sabahat Adil as Meerab's mother
- Memoona Qudoos as Shehna
- Shazia Qaiser as Ahmer's mother
