= Aangan (2017 TV series) =

2017 Pakistani family drama series

- Genre: Family drama Black humour
- Written by: Faiza Iftikhar
- Directed by: Qasim Ali Mureed
- Starring: (see cast)
- Country of origin: Pakistan
- Original languages: Urdu; Punjabi
- No. of episodes: 36

Production
- Executive producer: Samina Humayun Saeed
- Producers: Humayun Saeed; Shahzad Nasib
- Running time: 40 minutes
- Production company: Six Sigma Plus

Original release
- Network: ARY Digital
- Release: 11 November 2017 – 19 June 2018

Aangan (Urdu: آنگن, lit. 'Courtyard') is a Pakistani family drama television series that premiered on 11 November 2017 on ARY Digital and ended on 19 June 2018. The series was aired as part of the channel's night prime time slot programming.It was written by Faiza Iftikhar, directed by Qasim Ali Mureed and created by Humayun Saeed and Shahzad Nasib under Six Sigma Plus.

Aangan has an ensemble cast with Mansha Pasha, Qavi Khan, Samina Ahmad, Irsa Ghazal, Hassan Ahmed, Iffat Rahim, Zainab Qayyum, Waseem Abbas, Paras Masroor and Uzma Hassan in ensemble pivotal roles. It received three nominations at 18th Lux Style Awards.

== Plot ==
Aangan is the story of a joint Punjabi family headed by Mian ji who lives with his wife, Zaitoon Bano, his three sons with their families and an unmarried daughter, Zoya, he has another son staying abroad and another married daughter. They are worried about Zoya's marriage. Zoya's eldest sister in law, Hajira, invites her friend's son, Aqdus, to come live with them for some time as he lives abroad and is looking for an apartment. He falls in love with Zoya and asks his mom to come and ask for her hand in marriage. His mom though reluctant (as Zoya is older than Aqdus) asks for her son's marriage with Zoya, which leaves the family shocked as they had expected him to marry Shaina, Hajira's daughter.

Hajira's son, Sadaan is in love with Afra but cannot marry her as Hajira is against the marriage and wants Shaina to get married first. The second daughter in law, Laila has no child and often gets taunted for the same, however her husband, Asim loves her dearly. The third daughter in law, Rubeena is pregnant with her fourth child. Her husband, Zahid is a moulvi but he does nothing to support her kids or wife who are being looked after by his brothers. After Zoya marries Aqdus, the family is happy, but their happiness is cut-short as they find out that Asim has another wife Haseena. Also, Sadaan secretly marries Afra with the blessings of Asim, Zahid and his father Sajjad on his side.

Later Shafiq, the second son who lives in Germany, returns to Pakistan for his share of property so that he can use that money for his son Waleed's marriage. He tells everyone to sell the house and the factory, take their shares and live separately. Anila, the first daughter of the family and the troublemaker, is in favor of Shafiq, as she plans to marry off one of her daughters to Shafiq's son. But later, finds out that Shafiq had already arranged the marriage of his son with a rich businessman's daughter in Pakistan. Hence, it's decided by Mian Ji and the whole family that they would sell off the house and factory and distribute the property shares equally. Meanwhile, Sajjad, the eldest son's health has been deteriorating due to the recent happenings. And due to all those tractions, Sajjad dies of heart failure.

This shocks the whole family, while leaving Anila and Shafiq in guilt of being the cause of their brother's death. They decide to give up their shares in the assets. At last, Shafiq announces to everyone that he is giving up his property at his own will and leaves for Germany. A few months later, with everything back to normal, Zahid and Sadaan now run the factory and Haseena is now treated equally as Laila. The story ends with a good news that Afra, Sadaan's wife is pregnant with a baby girl.

== Cast ==
- Qavi khan as Mian Ji
- Samina Ahmed as Zaitoon Bano
- Mansha Pasha as Zoya; Mian Ji and Zaitoon's younger daughter
- Noor ul Hassan as Sajjad; son of Mian Ji
- Irsa Ghazal as Hajra Sajjad; Sajjad's wife
- Zainab Qayyum as Aneela; Mian Ji's elder daughter
- Waseem Abbas as Alauddin; son-in-law of Mian Ji, Aneela's husband
- Hassan Ahmed as Asim; second son of Mian Ji
- Iffat Rahim as Laila: Asim's first wife
- Yasra Rizvi as Haseena; Asim's Second wife
- Zia Gurchani as Shafiq; third son of Mian Ji
- Paras Masroor as Zahid; youngest son of Mian Ji
- Uzma Hassan as Rubina; Zahid's wife
- Mariam Mirza as Safeeha; Aqdas's mother
- Arsalan Faisal as Sadaan; Sajjad's son
- Mariam Ansari as Afrah; Saadan's fiancée and later wife
- Zubii Majeed as Shaheena: Sajjad's daughter
- Tauqeer Ahmed Paul as Aqdas
- Shazia Qaiser as Sadqa: Aqdas's aunt
- Fouzia Mushtaq as Shah Jahani Begum: Aqdas's aunt
- Mutahara Awan as Ramna
- Tasneem Ansari as Kulsoom
- Sahar Hashmi as Ramsha
- Gul-e-Rana as Bilqees Kenchi (cameo appearance)
- Fouzia Mushtaq (cameo appearance)

== Reception ==
=== Critics' views ===
Aangan has positive reviews from critics on its premier. Sadaf Hiader of Dawn Images lauded the serial by stating, "Angan gives us a fresh look at family life, showing us that dramas don’t have to follow the same dysfunctional tropes and tired old storylines to be entertaining." The Express Tribune said it as "a game changer of 2018" and praised its execution and writing, stating, "The best part about the story is that there is no lead character in particular and all the characters have been given their due time on screen to reflect their true essence."

== Accolades ==
Year	Award	Category	Recipient(s)	Result	Ref.
2019	ARY Digital- Social Media Drama Awards 2018	Best Drama Serial -2018	Aangan	Nominated	
2019	ARY Digital- Social Media Drama Awards 2018	Best Negative Actor (Female)	Zainab Qayyum	Nominated	
2019	ARY Digital- Social Media Drama Awards 2018	Best Director	Qasim Ali Mureed	Nominated	
2019	ARY Digital- Social Media Drama Awards 2018	Best Script Writer	Faiza Iftikhar	Nominated	
2019	18th Lux Style Awards	Best TV Actor- Viewer's choice	Qavi Khan	Nominated	
2019	18th Lux Style Awards	Best TV Actor- Critic's choice	Qavi Khan	Nominated	
2019	18th Lux Style Awards	Best TV Director	Qasim Ali Murid	Nominated	
2019	18th Lux Style Awards	Best TV Writer	Faiza Iftikhar	Nominated	
