= Zoya Nasir =

Pakistani actress

- Born: Zoya Nasir Adeeb; 15 October 1990 (age 35); Lahore, Punjab, Pakistan
- Other name: Zoe
- Education: Cosmetology by FIT, New York
- Occupations: Actress; Beautician; Model; Entrepreneur
- Years active: 2018 – present
- Parent(s): Nasir Adeeb (father); Amna Ulfat (mother)
- Relatives: Ghulam Hussain (grandfather); Khatija Begum (grandmother)

Zoya Nasir is a Pakistani actress, entrepreneur, model and beautician. She made her acting debut with a lead role in ARY Digital's crime drama Hania and later appeared in Deewangi. Zoya then did the role of Narmeen in Dobara and later portrayed the role of Sameen in Mere Humsafar. She further played a role of Maha in Noor Jahan and Nimme in Kaffara.

== Early life ==
Zoya belongs to a film family. Her father is a renowned screen writer with a Guinness Book of World Record for the most number of movies written (who also wrote Maula Jutt and The Legend of Maula Jutt). Her mother Amna Ulfat is a politician and currently she is a member of the Censor Board of Pakistan. Her late grandfather Ghulam Hussain was also a movie director and actor while her grandmother's name was Khatija Begum. Zoya pursued her passion as a beautician and has a salon in Lahore by the name of Sasha's by Zoya Nasir.

== Filmography ==
=== Television series ===
Year	Title	Role	Ref(s)
2019	Hania	Hania	
2019	Deewangi	Narmeen Durrani	
2020	Zebaish	Natasha	
2020	Prem Gali	Farzana	
2021	Mere Apne	Shumaila	
2021	Dobaara	Narmeen	
2021	Sirat e Mustaqeem	Laiba	
2021	Mere Humsafar	Sameen Jalees Ahmad	
2022	Badzaat	Annie	
2022	Chaudhry and Sons	Tooba	
2022	Bikhray Hain Hum	Sehrish	
2023	Jannat Se Aagay	Amber	
2023	Dil Hi Tou Hai	Abeera	
2024	Noor Jahan	Maha Safeer Shah	
2024	Kaffara	Nimme	
2026	Mahnoor	Mehwish	
2026	Bas Tera Saath Ho	Shehreen	

=== Web series ===
Year	Title	Role	Notes	Ref.
2020	Dhoop Ki Deewar	Neha Sharma	Web series released on ZEE5	

=== Film ===
Year	Title	Role	Notes
2020	Chambeli	Sobia	
