= Mere Humsafar (TV series) =

Pakistani television series

- Genre: Family Drama; Family Dynamics; Romantic
- Written by: Saira Raza
- Directed by: Qasim Ali Mureed
- Starring: Hania Aamir; Farhan Saeed
- Theme music composer: Naveed Nashad
- Opening theme: "Dil ye Mera" by Yashal Shahid; Amanat Ali; Zaheer Abbas
- Country of origin: Pakistan
- Original language: Urdu
- No. of episodes: 40

Production
- Producers: Humayun Saeed; Shehzad Naseeb
- Production company: Six Sigma Plus

Original release
- Network: ARY Digital
- Release: 30 December 2021 – 29 September 2022

Mere Humsafar (transl. My Companion) is a Pakistani romantic drama television series produced by Humayun Saeed and Shehzad Naseeb under the banner Six Sigma Plus. Directed by Qasim Ali Mureed and written by Saira Raza, it aired from 30 December 2021 to 29 September 2022 on ARY Digital. It stars Farhan Saeed and Hania Aamir as leads along with Saba Hameed, Waseem Abbas, Samina Ahmad, Zoya Nasir and Omer Shahzad in supporting roles.

Mere Humsafar revolves around a girl, Hala, whose father has settled in London and left her at her paternal uncle's house in Pakistan, where she is mistreated, especially by Shahjahan, her paternal aunt. Later, Shahjahan's son, Hamza, returns from abroad, marries her and gives her the respect she always needed. The series met with mixed reviews from the audience and is highly rated. It has gained popularity in Pakistan, India, Bangladesh, Nepal and UAE.

At the 22nd Lux Style Awards, the series received seven nominations, including Best TV Play and Best Ensemble Play, and won the Best TV Original Soundtrack.

== Plot ==
Hala, a British‑Pakistani girl, is left in Pakistan when her father - Nafees moves abroad with his new wife. Raised in her uncle Raees’s home, she suffers constant mistreatment from Raees, Shah Jahan, and Sofia. Shah Jahan has always been envious of Hala and blames her for every situation that turns bad. Only her grandmother Riffat and uncle Jalees support her. Because of constant blames, pressures and threats, while growing up Hala becomes a traumatized and stressed person, who has no confidence and self-worth. Hala is vulnerable and timid; a dependent yet kind-hearted and innocent person who can easily be trapped.

As a teen, Hala has only one person to confide in, her best friend, a listening ear, Shafaq, who is also Khurram's cousin and fiance. Unaware of the fact that Shafaq is engaged to Khurram, Hala secretly sees Khurram, who later betrays her after Shah Jahan poisons his mind. When Shafaq gets to know about Hala and Khurram, she cuts her ties with both of them. Raees tries to marry Hala to a mentally unstable man, but Hamza, Shah Jahan’s son who has returned from abroad, stops the marriage. Shah Jahan always wished Sameen to become her daughter-in-law and she praises Sameen even for the small acts she does. Sameen is a confident, intelligent and smart girl and a perfect match for Hamza.

A misunderstanding leads Shah Jahan to blame Hala for a family incident and throw her out. In order to protect Hala from any such situation arising in the future, Hamza marries her. The family resents Hala except her grandmother, but Hamza stands by her side, always supports her, makes her feel valued and the two gradually fall in love. Meanwhile, Khurram returns in Hala's life, making her uncomfortable, this time being a well-wisher and a prospective match for Sameen.

Hala's journey continues with Hamza where he gradually tries to bring Hala out of her past trauma and help her regain lost confidence. Everyone tries their hands to separate them, ruin their marriage and take revenge on Hala for daring to marry Hamza; and their plan works to some extent. At that point, Hala is supported by her father and younger half sister, who returns to Pakistan when her grandmother Riffat dies.

In the end, Hala and Hamza reunite as a stronger couple, with Hala finally confident and valued.

== Cast ==
=== Main ===
- Farhan Saeed as Hamza Raees Ahmed - Raees and Shah Jahan's elder son
- Hania Aamir as Hala Hamza Ahmed (née Nafees Ahmed) - Nafees's daughter
  - Hoorain Lyka Ali as Young Hala Nafees Ahmed

=== Recurring ===
- Samina Ahmad as Riffat Aara Ahmed - Raees, Nafees and Jalees' mother
- Waseem Abbas as Raees Ahmad - Riffat's eldest son
- Saba Hameed as Shah Jahan Raees Ahmed - Raees's wife
- Hira Khan as Rumi Waqas (née Raees Ahmed) - Raees and Shah Jahan' younger daughter
- Aamir Qureshi as Jalees Ahmed - Riffat's youngest son
- Tara Mahmood as Sofia Jalees Ahmed - Jalees' wife
- Zoya Nasir as Sameen Jalees Ahmad - Sofia and Jalees' daughter
- Alyy Khan as Nafees Ahmed - Riffat's second son
- Hira Umer as Maryam Nafees Ahmed - Nafees's younger daughter
- Syeda Iman Zaid as Shafaq - Hala's best friend
- Omer Shahzad as Khurram - Shafaq's cousin and former fiancée
- Farah Nadeem as Khurram's mother
- Usman Javed

== Production ==
=== Development ===
Hania Aamir and Farhan Saeed played the leads Hala and Hamza respectively.

The project was first announced in August 2021 with the working title of Jhooti. Director Qasim Ali Mureed told Dawn Images that it's a family story with a love story in the middle of it. He further added that the story touches upon contemporary issues and it's all quite relatable.

=== Casting ===
Hania Aamir was approached to portray Hala. While, she first refused the show because she felt Hala was not the kind of role she would accept immediately. She later agreed to do it because of co-actor Farhan Saeed and director Qasim Ali Mureed. Farhan Saeed was cast to portray Hamza, although he was not the first choice for the role. Writer Saira Raza revealed that she was apprehensive to cast him because of his portrayal of an immature and mischievous person in Suno Chanda, a complete opposite of Hamza.

=== Release ===
The first look and the teaser of the series was unveiled on 21 December 2021. The first episode aired on 30 December 2021 on ARY Digital and subsequent episodes were released every Thursday.

== Soundtrack ==
"Mere Humsafar"

Single by Naveed Nashad
- Language: Urdu
- Genre: Theme song
- Length: 14:38
- Composer: Naveed Nashad
- Lyricist: Qamar Nashad
- Producers: Humayun Saeed; Shehzad Naseeb
External videos
- Music video on YouTube

The Mere Humsafar title song is sung by Amanat Ali, Yashal Shahid and Zaheer Abbas, composed by Naveed Nashad with lyrics by Qamar Nashad.

Track list
No.	Title	Singer(s)	Length
1.	"Mere Humsafar" (OST)	Amanat Ali, Yashal Shahid, Zaheer Abbas	3:34
2.	"Mere Humsafar" (Female)	Yashal Shahid	5:52
3.	"Mere Humsafar" (Male)	Amanat Ali, Zaheer Abbas	5:52

== Reception ==
=== Critical reception ===
The series met with mostly positive reviews. The performances of the star cast received positive response with special praises directed towards Farhan Saeed and Hania Aamir's characters.

A reviewer from The Friday Times praised the character of Hamza but criticised the series to glorify the violence.

The Brown Identity stated, "'Mere Humsafar' will always be remembered for Hamza and Hala as a hit pair. But, the real winner of the show is Sameen's character. The show was good enough – but it could have been great." Galaxy Lollywood noted, "The dreamy love story, the chemistry and the soundtrack makes Mere Humsafar so popular." Indian newspaper Navbharat Times termed "Hala and Hamza's chemistry" as the biggest reason for the success of the show. India TV noted, "Hala and Hamza's performance, chemistry and the title track has hooked the Indian audience."

=== Television ratings ===
Apart from critical acclaim, Mere Humsafar was one of the most popular dramas of 2022. The series achieved its highest rating of 11.2 in its 38th and 40th episodes.

Episode No.	Date	TRP	Ref.
1	30 December 2021	7.3	
2	6 January 2022	8.1	
3	13 January 2022	7.7	
4	20 January 2022	7.3	
5	27 January 2022	4.5	
6	3 February 2022	5.7	
7	10 February 2022	7.0	
8	17 February 2022	8.0	
9	24 February 2022	9.0	
10	3 March 2022	9.8	
11	10 March 2022	8.4	
12	17 March 2022	9.2	
13	24 March 2022	8.6	
14	31 March 2022	6.3	
15	8 April 2022	7.45	
16	15 April 2022	4.7	
17	22 April 2022	4.1	
18	29 April 2022	4.1	
19	12 May 2022	6.5	
20	19 May 2022	5.6	
21	26 May 2022	7.33	
22	2 June 2022	6.4	
23	9 June 2022	6.7	
24	16 June 2022	5.1	
25	23 June 2022	5.0	
26	30 June 2022	5.3	
27	7 July 2022	5.7	
28	14 July 2022	6.6	
29	21 July 2022	6.7	
30	28 July 2022	7.2	
31	4 August 2022	7.0	
32	11 August 2022	7.0	
33	18 August 2022	6.5	
34	18 August 2022	6.5	
35	25 August 2022	7.0	
36	1 September 2022	6.0	
37	8 September 2022	5.3	
38	15 September 2022	11.2	
39	22 September 2022	8.2	
40	29 September 2022	11.2	

== Controversy ==
The series was often called out for being similar to the 2011 series Humsafar. It also landed in controversy after its showcased Hindu religion. During the death sequence, the cast was dressed in white, a customary of the Hindus.

== Accolades ==
Year	Ceremony	Category	Recipient	Result	Ref.
2022	22nd Lux Style Awards	Best TV Play	Mere Humsafar	Nominated	
2022	22nd Lux Style Awards	Best TV Actor	Farhan Saeed	Nominated	
2022	22nd Lux Style Awards	Best TV Actor - Critics' Choice	Farhan Saeed	Nominated	
2022	22nd Lux Style Awards	Best TV Actress	Hania Aamir	Nominated	
2022	22nd Lux Style Awards	Best TV Actress - Critics' Choice	Hania Aamir	Nominated	
2022	22nd Lux Style Awards	Best TV Original Soundtrack	Mere Humsafar	Won	
2022	22nd Lux Style Awards	Best Ensemble Play	Mere Humsafar	Nominated	

== Impact ==
Mere Humsafar was ranked by the Pakistani media as one of the best and most watched drama of 2022. Farhan Saeed and Hania Aamir received positive feedback for their portrayal of Hamza and Hala, and for breaking various stereotype. Saeed and Aamir's pair was termed as one of the most loved on-screen couple of 2022. The series received high praises and popularity across the globe, mainly in India, Nepal, Bangladesh and UAE. It has often trended on Twitter and is one of the most watched Pakistani drama series on YouTube with over a billion views.
