= Pichal Pairee =

Studio album by Overload
- Released: August 14, 2009 (re-released on October 5, 2009)
- Recorded: 2007–2009 at Riot Studios in Lahore, Pakistan
- Genre: Instrumental rock Psychedelic rock Fusion
- Length: 41:35
- Label: Riot Records, Universal Music
- Producer: Farhad Humayun

Overload chronology
Overload (2006)	Pichal Pairee (2009)

Singles from Pichal Pairee
- 1. "Pichal Pairee" Released: September 23, 2009; 2. "Mela Kariyay" Released: October 9, 2009; 3. "Batti (Dhol Bajay Ga!)" Released: March 31, 2011

Pichal Pairee is the second album by the Pakistani rock band Overload, released on 14 August 2009, after three years since their debut album. The first single of the album, "Pichal Pairee", was released on 23 September 2009. "Mela Kariyay" was released on October 9, 2009.

On 26 December, in an online poll by Dawn News the band's video for their single, "Pichal Pairee", was voted as the third best music video of 2010.

== Track listing ==
All music arranged & composed by Sheraz Siddiq except "Pichal Pairee" composed by Hassan Mohyeddin.

Pichal Pairee
No.	Title	Length
1.	"Dig"	4:01
2.	"Dhol Bajay Ga!"	3:54
3.	"Pichal Pairee"	4:40
4.	"Amjad Khan"	4:47
5.	"Vichar Gai"	5:32
6.	"A Thousand Miracles"	3:05
7.	"Mela Kariyay (Cursed Universal Mix)"	4:14
8.	"Kaykra"	4:45
9.	"Saat Mein"	6:32

== Personnel ==
Overload

- Sheraz Siddiq - keyboards/Synth Bass
- Farhad Humayun - drums
- Meesha Shafi - vocals, backing vocals
- Mahmood Rahman - guitar
- Nasir Sain - dhol

Additional musicians

- Pakhawaj on "Saat Mein": Ustad Allah Loke
- Clarinet on "A Thousand Miracles": Jaffer Hussain
- Hormonium: Shafqat Hussain
- Bass: Sameer Ahmad, Farhan Ali
- Pakhawaj: Ustab Allah Loke
- Electronic Music on Pichal Pairee: Hassan Mohyeddin

Production

- Music Composition and Arrangement by Farhad Humayun & Sheraz Siddiq
- Produced by Farhad Humayun
- Recorded & Mixed at Riot Studios, Lahore, Punjab
- Mixed by Farhad Humayun
- Mastered by Shahi Hasan
