= Overload (Pakistani band) =

- Origin: Lahore, Punjab, Pakistan
- Genres: Instrumental rock, experimental rock, classical music, psychedelic rock, fusion
- Years active: 2003–present
- Labels: BMN Records, Riot Records, Universal Music
- Members: Aziz Ibrahim; Nasir Sain
- Past members: Farhad Humayun; Pappu Sain; Jhura Sain; Hassan Mohyeddin; Mahmood Rahman; Meesha Shafi
- Website: www.overload.rocks

Overload (Urdu: اوور لوڈ) is a Pakistani rock band from Lahore, Punjab, formed in August 2003. The group is directed by producer, lead vocalist and drummer, Farhad Humayun and keyboard/synth player, songwriter and composer, Sheraz Siddiq, who were soon joined by Hassan Mohyeddin on percussion along with dhol players Pappu Sain and Jhura Sain. The band has been regarded by some critics as the 'Loudest band in Pakistan'.

Since their inception, the band has released two studio albums and two live albums. The band released their debut self-titled album Overload in December, 2006. The album charted at the top of the local Pakistani music charts. Singles from the album included instrumentals "Dhamaal", "Cursed" and "Storm". After the release of the album, Pappu Sain, regarded as the greatest dhol player in the world, left the band due to ill health and was replaced by Nasir Sain. In 2008, their single "Dhamaal" got nominated in the 'Best Music Video' category at the Lux Style Awards. This was followed by the band releasing their second studio album, Pichal Pairee, in 2009. Although, the album released exclusively as a digital download album, and has not been released on any physical medium, it still topped the charts locally. Singles from the album, "Pichal Pairee", "Mela Kariyay" and "Dhol Bajay Ga!" [now known as "Batti"] were hits. In an online poll by Dawn News the band's video for their single, "Pichal Pairee", was voted as the third best music video of 2010.

== Formation and initial years ==
The band was formed in 2003 by producer, lead vocalist and drummer, Farhad Humayun and keyboard/synth player, songwriter and composer, Sheraz Siddiq.

== Second album ==
In 2010 the band released their second album "Pichal Pairee" as a digital download album. The first single to be released from the album was "Pichal Paire". The video was directed by Hasaan Ashraf, which received a lot of critical acclaim for its slick camera angles and the way it was shot. The next video "Mela Kariye" was directed by Farhad Humayun himself for which he received a nomination at the Lux Style Awards for the ‘Best Music Video Director". The next video to be released from the album was "Batti" which was directed by Farhad Humayun & Hassaan Ashraf. The styling for the video as done by ace designer HSY. The song also got featured in Mira Nair's adaptation of The Reluctant Fundamentalist and later in Pakistan's first animated TV series Burka Avenger. The band got nominated for the 'Best Music Artist' award at the Lux Style Awards 2010 for the album. Farhad Humayun was nominated for the 'Best Music Producer' for "Pichal Pairee" & for the 'Best Music Video Director' for Mela Kariyay.

== Recent work ==
Overload released the video of Ankahi in 2011. Overload launched the official video of the second single of the year 2011 "Neray Aah". In celebration of their 10-year anniversary, Overload released a special single "Jeet" on 14 August 2013.

After a one-year hiatus Overload released two singles accompanied by stylized music videos. Nimmi Nimmi in November 2014 became a hit on radio, social media and TV.

Bolo Na, for the child victims of Tharparkar and terrorism victims in Peshawar Army Public School, was a praised video and song that had an impact on the lives of people all over the world and received critical acclaim from many producers, directors and actors in Hollywood.

In 2015, a Bollywood film asked Overload to use Neray Aah in the film Main Hoon Rajinikanth which the band refused as the director wanted to use the song for free claiming the band would receive a lot of publicity. Neray Aah was also requested for another Bollywood film starring Sanjay Dutt, however the producers wanted to an Indian artist to sing it thus the band declined the offer.

== Death ==
Farhad Humayun died on 8 June 2021.

== Discography ==
=== Studio albums ===
- Overload (2006)
- Pichal Pairee (2009)

=== Live albums ===
- Overload Live at the Apartment Sessions (2011)

=== Singles ===
- Cursed (2005)
- Storm (2006)
- Dhamaal (2007)
- Pichal Pairee (2009)
- Mela Kariye (2010)
- Batti (2011)
- Neray Aah (2011)
- Mahi (2012)
- Ankahi (2013)
- Jeet (2013)
- Nimmi Nimmi (2014)
- Bolo Na (2015)
- Lahore (2016)

== Band members ==
- Farhad Humayun - drums, vocals

== Featured artists ==
- Aziz Ibrahim - Guitars
- Ustad Jaffar - Clarinet
- Punjab Brass Band
- Hassan Omar - DJ, Guitars
- Various - Dhol

== Awards ==
- Won the 'Best Live Act Award' at the Lux Style Awards 2006.
- "Dhamaal" Nominated for the 'Best Music Video' at the Lux Style Awards 2008.
- Nominated for the 'Best Music Artist' award at the Lux Style Awards 2010 for their album Pichal Pairee.
- "Jeet" Won Song of the year 2014 at the 2nd HUM TV Awards
- "Nimmi Nimmi" Nominated for Best Song 2015 at the 3rd HUM TV Awards.

== See also ==
- List of Pakistani music bands
