= Australia-Asia Literary Award =

Former Western Australian literary award

- Sponsored by: Government of Western Australia
- Date: November 2008
- Country: Australia
- Hosted by: Department of Culture and the Arts
- Reward: A$110,000
- First award: 2008
- Final award: 2008

Australia-Asia Literary Award (AALA) was a literary award supported by the former Government of Western Australia department, the Department of Culture and the Arts.

== History ==
The Australia-Asia Literary Award was established in 2007 and the first and only winner was announced in November 2008, from entries published in 2007.

In 2010 it was announced the award would be discontinued, with resources merged with the Western Australian Premier's Book Awards (PBA). "The AALA will be discontinued immediately so we can free up some of those funds for an improved Premier’s Book Awards." On 15 February 2010, the PBA began accepting for entry books published in 2008 and 2009 for the 2010 PBA.

== Description ==
The Australia-Asia Literary Award was Australia's richest literary prize, with a purse of A$110,000.

== Shortlist and winner ==
Winner announced in November 2008 for books published in 2007.

Winner

- David Malouf, The Complete Stories

Shortlist

- Michelle de Kretser, The Lost Dog
- Mohsin Hamid, The Reluctant Fundamentalist
- David Malouf, The Complete Stories
- Ceridwen Dovey, Blood Kin
- Janette Turner Hospital, Orpheus Lost
