= The Last White Man =

2022 novel by Mohsin Hamid

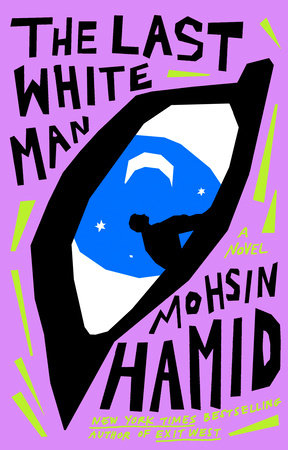
- Author: Mohsin Hamid
- Language: English
- Publisher: Penguin Publishing Group
- Publication date: August 2, 2022
- ISBN: 9780593538814

The Last White Man is a 2022 novel by Pakistani author Mohsin Hamid. It is Hamid's fifth novel. The main themes of the book are love, loss, change, and identity. The Last White Man was longlisted for the 2023 Aspen Words Literary Prize.

== Summary ==
The novel uses the technique of magical realism, and it is about a white man, Anders, who one morning wakes up to find himself changed to a darker skin color and a different, unfamiliar appearance. Soon, more people begin to experience the same changes, and society finds itself divided and puzzled with questions about race, privilege, loss, love, identity, and belonging.

== Related works ==
Hamid published a short story on the same theme as 'The Face in the Mirror' in the same year as the novel.
