= Moth Smoke =

2000 novel by Mohsin Hamid

- First edition (UK)
- Author: Mohsin Hamid
- Language: English
- Publisher: Granta (UK); Farrar, Straus and Giroux (US)
- Publication date: 2000
- Publication place: United Kingdom
- Media type: Print (hardback and paperback)
- ISBN: 0-374-21354-2
- OCLC: 42397410
- Dewey Decimal: 813/.54 21
- LC Class: PS3558.A42169 M68 2000

Moth Smoke is the debut novel by British Pakistani novelist Mohsin Hamid, published in 2000. It follows Darashikoh Shezad, a banker in Lahore, Pakistan, who loses his job, falls in love with his best friend's wife, and plunges into a life of drugs and crime. It uses the historical trial of the liberal Mughal prince Dara Shikoh by his brother Aurangzeb as an allegory for the state of Pakistan at the time of the 1998 nuclear tests.

== Synopsis ==
Darashikoh, or Daru as he is referred to, is a mid-level banker with a short fuse. His aggression had served him well as a college-boxer but an out-of-character outburst gets him fired. The loss of income brings a widening gap between him and his classmates, and Daru exposes his bitterness to the wealthy in his commentary. This contrast in income, though present through their years at school becomes evident to Daru only now as he realizes that money and wealth mean more than his personal traits can offer.

He is content to interact with his rich friends all the same, and finds comfort in the arms of Mumtaz – Daru's best friend's wife. Mumtaz falls for Daru too, but unlike Daru, she is not an idealist. This mismatch of thought comes to the forefront soon after the long and rocky affair begins. While cuckolding his best friend, Daru is content to sell him drugs, which are socially acceptable among his friends. This life of duplicity leads to a spiralling loss of control in his life.

== Reception ==
In a highly positive review for The New York Times, Jhumpa Lahiri compared Hamid to F. Scott Fitzgerald for depicting the "slippery ties between the extremely wealthy and those who hover, and generally stumble, in money’s glare". In The New York Review of Books, Anita Desai noted: "One could not really continue to write, or read about, the slow seasonal changes, the rural backwaters, gossipy courtyards, and traditional families in a world taken over by gun-running, drug-trafficking, large-scale industrialism, commercial entrepreneurship, tourism, new money, nightclubs, boutiques... Where was the Huxley, the Orwell, the Scott Fitzgerald, or even the Tom Wolfe, Jay McInerney, or Brett Easton Ellis to record this new world? Mohsin Hamid's novel Moth Smoke, set in Lahore, is one of the first pictures we have of that world."

== Awards and nominations ==
The novel won a Betty Trask Award, was a finalist for the PEN/Hemingway Award, and was a New York Times Notable Book of The Year.

== Adaptations ==
The book was adapted into the 2002 Pakistani film, Daira (which translates to "circle" in Urdu). It was directed by Azfar Ali and stars Pakistani actor Shahzad Nawaz, who also wrote the screenplay. A Hindi version was planned to be directed by Rahul Bose but could not materialise due to financial constraints.
