= Saba Hameed =

Pakistani actress (born 1957)

- صبا حميد
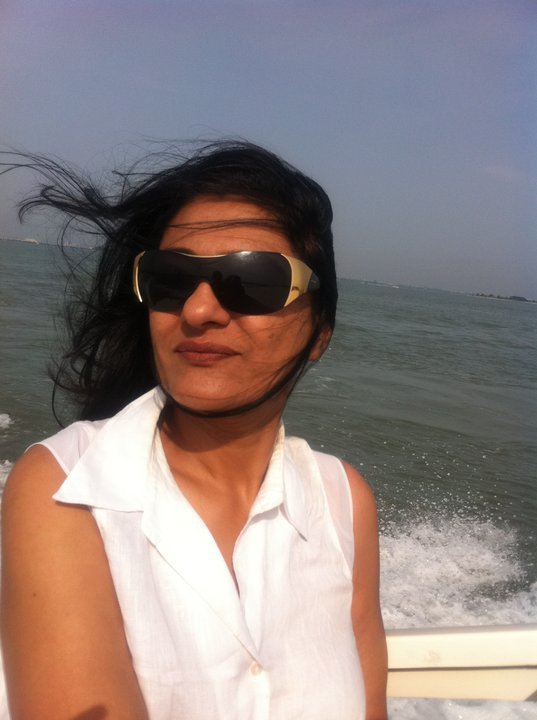
- Born: Saba Hameed Akhtar; 21 June 1957 (age 69); Lahore, Punjab, Pakistan
- Occupations: Actress; Director
- Years active: 1978–present
- Spouses: Syed Parvaiz Shafi (m.1980-1990); Waseem Abbas (m.1993-2022)
- Children: Meesha Shafi (daughter); Faris Shafi (son); Ali Abbas (step-son)
- Parent: Hameed Akhtar (father)
- Relatives: Huma Hameed (sister)
- Honours: Pride of Performance (2012)
- Website: www.sabahamid.com

Saba Hameed (Urdu: صبا حميد) is a Pakistani actress and director. She got early recognition with her role of Sumbul in sitcom Family Front which broadcast for five years. Her recent recent roles are in the TV drama series Kahin Deep Jaley, Mere Humsafar and Fitoor.

== Early life ==
Saba was born in Lahore, Pakistan, to writer and columnist Hameed Akhtar and Saadia, a film producer. She studied at the Lahore College for Women University. Her siblings include three sisters, with Huma and Lalarukh having also been actresses, and one brother.

== Career ==
Saba Hameed started her four-decade-long career as an actress in 1978 on television and also worked in theatre from the mid-1980s to the mid-1990s. Saba has portrayed mother's role in many dramas and telefilms.

== Personal life ==
From 1980 to 1990, Saba Hameed was married to Syed Pervaiz Shafi, with whom she has two children: a daughter, actress and singer Meesha Shafi, and a son, Faris Shafi.

== Filmography ==
=== Television series ===
Year	Drama	Role	Director	Channel	Ref(s)
1978	Dheleez	Nazi		PTV	
1979	Band Darwazay	Aiman		PTV	
1980	Teesra Kinara	Salma		PTV	
1980	Cinderella Aur Sakina	Sakina		PTV	
1984	Ik Hasrat e Tameer	Seema		PTV	
1984	Andhera Ujala	Rubi		PTV	
1984	Status	Sahira		PTV	
1984	Dukhon Ki Chadar	Naila		PTV	
1985	Saahil	Neeli		PTV	
1985	Apnay Log	Kulsoom		PTV	
1985	Asaan Se Baat	Heer		PTV	
1986	Rassi Ki Zanjeer	Farzana		PTV	
1986	Waqt	Afroz		PTV	
1986	Show Time	Herself		PTV	
1986	Inn Sey Miliay	Mehngai		PTV	
1986	Hazaroon Khwahishain	Hina		PTV	
1987	Aasman	Tahira		PTV	
1988	Band Gali	Seemi		PTV	
1989	Neelay Hath	Parveen		PTV	
1991	Patt Jharr	Fariha		PTV	
1993	Nangey Paon	Roohi		PTV	
1994	Sannata	Kulsoom		PTV	
1994	Surkh Batti	Sikandara		PTV	
1995	Hamam Mein	Farkhanda		PTV	
1995	Uncle Sargam Show	Malika		PTV	
1995	Nashaib	Kausar		PTV	
1995	Teen Bata Teen	Saba		PTV	
1995	Uraan	Neelam		PTV	
1996	Ranjish	Kulsoom		PTV	
1996	Heera Mann	Taj Bibi		PTV	
1997	Family Front	Sumbal		PTV	
1998	Neeli Chiriya	Sumaira		PTV	
1999	Girah	Rashida		PTV	
1999	Chandpur Ka Chandoo	Mehr un nisa		PTV	
2000	Tere Ishq Mein	Anaya		PTV	
2001	Chehray			PTV	
2002	Duniya Dari	Samia		PTV	
2004	Be Zaban	Bakht un nisa		PTV	
2006	Gharoor	Kalsoom		PTV	
2007	Aas	Zareena		PTV	
2007	Thori Door Saath Chalo	Saira's mother		Hum TV	
2009	Azar Ki Ayegi Baraat	Rabia Ahmed		Geo Entertainment	
2010	Milay Kuch Yun	Tehmina		ARY Digital	
2010	Dolly Ki Ayegi Baraat	Rabia Ahmed		Geo Entertainment	
2010	Barish Ke Aansoo	Areej's mother		Geo Entertainment	
2010	Angoori	Angoori		TV One	
2010	Main Abdul Qadir Hoon	Meera		Hum TV	
2010	Dastaan	Rasheeda		Hum TV	
2010	Qaid-e-Tanhai	Aliya		Hum TV	
2011	Kala Jadoo	Shireen		ARY Digital	
2011	Mastana Mahi	Aleen's mother		Hum TV	
2011	Anokha Ladla	Muniro		PTV Home	
2011	Band Khirkyon Kay Peechay	Attiya		TV One	
2011	Takkay Ki Ayegi Baraat	Rabia Ahmed		Geo Entertainment	
2012	Din Dhallay	Faiza		PTV Home	
2012	Aks	Shahbano		Hum TV	
2012	Vanee	Amber		Geo Entertainment	
2012	Annie Ki Ayegi Baraat	Rabia Ahmed		Geo Entertainment	
2012	Man Jali	Zareena		Geo Entertainment	
2012	Thakan	Zubaida		ARY Digital	
2012	Ik Tamanna Lahasil Si	Ruqaiyya		Hum TV	
2012	Aik Nayee Cinderella	Meher		Geo Entertainment	
2012	Band Khirkyon Kay Peechay	Attiya		TV One	
2013	Qarz	Rehmat		ARY Digital	
2013	Pyaray Afzal	Ruqaiya Subanullah		ARY Digital	
2013	Meri Dulari	Bibi Jan		Geo Entertainment	
2013	Tanhai	Faiz's mother		Hum TV	
2013	Dil e Muztar	Sila's mother		Hum TV	
2014	Kaisay Kahoon	Begum		PTV	
2014	Socha Na Tha	Faryal		Geo Entertainment	
2014	Bikhra Mera Naseeb	Hina' Mother		Geo Entertainment	
2014	De Ijazat Jo Tu	Sarmad's mother		Hum TV	
2014	Tum Meray Hi Rehna	Rania's Mother		Hum TV	
2015	Dilfareb	Razia		Geo Entertainment	
2015	Tumhari Natasha	Natasha's mother		Hum TV	
2015	Guzaarish	Batool		ARY Digital	
2015	Mein Adhuri	Zubaida Mansoor		ARY Digital	
2016	Mann Mayal	Minahil's mother		Hum TV	
2016	Deewana (TV series)	Shamma		Hum TV	
2016	Dil Lagi	Zulekha		ARY Digital	
2017	Khuda Mera Bhi Hai	Mah Gull's mother		ARY Digital	
2017	Muqabil	Parisa's mother		ARY Digital	
2017	Aisi Hai Tanhai	Pakeeza's mother		ARY Digital	
2017	Faisla	Maryam's mother		ARY Digital	
2017	Laal Ishq	Mehrunissa		A-Plus Entertainment	
2017	Khan	Rahat		Geo Entertainment	
2018	Lashkara	Nasreen		ARY Digital	
2018	Aatish	Sheheryar's mother		Hum TV	
2018	Baba Jani	Najeeba		Geo Entertainment	
2019	Meray Mohsin	Khursheed Begum		Geo Entertainment	
2019	Bhool	Bano		ARY Digital	
2019	Choti Choti Batain	Shaista		Hum TV	
2019	Kahin Deep Jaley	Zeeshan's mother		Geo Entertainment	
2019	Ghalati	Zaitoon	Yes	ARY Digital	
2020	Dushman e Jaan	Fiza		ARY Digital	
2020	Prem Gali	Shireen		ARY Digital	
2020	Ghisi Piti Mohabbat	Aziza Sultan		ARY Digital	
2020	Bandhay Aik Dor Say	Zakia		Geo Entertainment	
2020	Raja Ki Raji	Haya's mother		ARY Digital	
2021	Mujhe Wida Kar	Sultana		ARY Digital	
2021	Fitoor	Aneesa		Geo Entertainment	
2021	Berukhi	Shah Bano		ARY Digital	
2021	Amanat	Firdous		ARY Digital	
2021	Sinf-e-Aahan	Mahjabeen's mother		ARY Digital	
2021	Bisaat	Noor		Hum TV	
2022	Mere Humsafar	Shahjahan Raees Ahmed		ARY Digital	
2022	Chauraha	Shireen		Geo Entertainment	
2023	College Gate	Catherine		Green Entertainment	
2023	Honey Moon	Shakila		Green Entertainment	
2023	Jaisay Aapki Marzi	No	Yes	ARY Digital	
2023	Kalank	Shahana		Geo Entertainment	
2024	Noor Jahan	Noor Jahan		ARY Digital	
2024	Ghair	Tehzeeb		ARY Digital	
2024	Sunn Mere Dil	Farzana Naamdar		Geo Entertainment	
2025	Ae Dil	Shakeela		ARY Digital	
2025	Mann Mast Malang	Mah Bina		Geo Entertainment	
2025	Main Manto Nahi Hoon	Zulekha Binyamin		ARY Digital	
2025	Faaslay	Zeenat		Green Entertainment	
2026	Doctor Bahu	Farheen		ARY Digital	
2026	Bas Tera Saath Ho	Shaziya		ARY Digital	
2026	Dar-e-Nijaat	Kishwar Khala		ARY Digital	

=== Telefilms ===
Year	Title	Role
2013	Abhi Tou Main Jawan Hoon	Tanveer
2022	Neelofer Tsunami	Ansa's mother
2022	Aunty Allergy	Zubaida
2023	Tamak Toiyan	Beena's mother
2024	Achari Mohabbat	Sikandar's mother

=== Films ===
Year	Movie	Role
2007	Mein Ek Din Laut Kay Aaoon Ga	Mrs. Haroon
2012	Hazar Ka Note	Husnara
2015	Good Morning Karachi	Rafina's mother
2015	Jawani Phir Nahi Ani	Madame
2017	Punjab Nahi Jaungi	Firdous Khagga
2019	Kaaf Kangana	Amma
2022	London Nahi Jaunga	Sara Mansoor Tiwana

== Awards and nominations ==
Year	Award	Category	Work	Result	Ref(s)
1987	Nigar Award	Best Actress	Aasman	Won	
2000	PTV Award	Best Actress	Family Front	Won	
2023	PTV Icon Awards	National Icon Awards	—N/a	Won	
2002	1st Lux Style Awards	Best TV Actress	—N/a	Nominated	
2005	4th Lux Style Awards	Best TV Actress (Satellite)	Woh Tees Din	Nominated	
2007	6th Lux Style Awards	Best TV Actress (Satellite)	Tere Ishq Mein	Nominated	
2007	6th Lux Style Awards	Best TV Actress (Terrestrial)	Gharoor	Nominated	
2008	7th Lux Style Awards	Best TV Actress (Satellite)	Vanee	Nominated	
2013	12th Lux Style Awards	Best TV Actress (Satellite)	Man Jali	Nominated	
2015	14th Lux Style Awards	Best TV Actress	Pyarey Afzal	Nominated	
2025	2nd Kya Drama Hai Icon Awards	Best Performance in a Negative Role (Critics’ Choice)	Noor Jahan	Nominated	
2025	2nd Kya Drama Hai Icon Awards	Best Performance in a Negative Role (Popular Choice)	Noor Jahan	Won	
2026	3rd Pakistan International Screen Awards	Best TV Actress (Critics' Choice)	Noor Jahan	Nominated	

=== Government Awards ===
Year	Award	Category	Result	Presented by	Ref.
2012	Pride of Performance	Arts	Won	Award by the President of Pakistan	

== See also ==
- List of Pakistani actresses
