= How to Get Filthy Rich in Rising Asia =

2013 novel by Mohsin Hamid

- First edition (UK)
- Author: Mohsin Hamid
- Published: 2013
- Publisher: Hamish Hamilton (UK); Riverhead Books (US)
- ISBN: 978-1-59448-729-3

How to Get Filthy Rich in Rising Asia is Mohsin Hamid's third novel, published in 2013 by Hamish Hamilton in the United Kingdom and Riverhead Books in the United States.

The novel uses a second-person perspective, referring to the protagonist only as "you." The story takes place in an unnamed country that resembles Hamid's home country of Pakistan. It details the protagonist's beginnings as a poor boy, and quest for wealth and love as he moves to the city and enters the bottled water business.

== Reception ==
How to Get Filthy Rich in Rising Asia was generally well-received, including a starred review from Kirkus Reviews, who called it "[a]nother great success ... and another illustration of how richly the colonial margins are feeding the core of literature in English." The Telegraph called the novel Hamid's "most impressive yet." Nick DiMartino, writing for Shelf Awareness, applauded how Hamid "combines extremely lean prose and a wry sense of irony to create a dramatic monologue with a wickedly satirical vision of modern times."

Publishers Weekly noted that "though readers may find it frustrating that [story arcs for the protagonist and love interest] never overlap for long, the intermittent intersections provide them an anchor to the lives they left in desperation." They continued, stating, "The book takes its formal cues from the self-help genre, but the adopting of that form’s unceasing optimism also nullifies any sense of depth or struggle. Fortunately, Hamid offers a subtle and rich look at the social realities of developing countries, including corruption, poverty, and how economic development affects daily life from top to bottom." In their review of the audiobook, Publishers Weekly noted that while the novel's use of the second-person perspective can yield a "curious listening experience ... it works exceedingly well here because ... listeners wait with great anticipation to learn what will happen to 'you.'"

Awards and honours for How to Get Filthy Rich in Rising Asia
Year	Award/Honour	Result	Ref.
2013	DSC Prize for South Asian Literature	Shortlist	
2013	Tiziano Terzani International Literary Prize	Winner	
2014	International Literature Award	Shortlist	
