= Faris Shafi =

Pakistani rapper, actor

- فارس شفیع
- Born: 2 November 1987 (age 38); Lahore, Punjab, Pakistan
- Occupations: Rapper; Actor; Songwriter
- Parents: Syed Pervaiz Shafi (father); Saba Hameed (mother)
- Relatives: Meesha Shafi (sister); Hameed Akhtar (maternal grandfather)
- Musical career
- Genres: Hip Hop; Rap
- Instrument: Vocals
- Label: Coke Studio Pakistan

Faris Shafi (Urdu/Punjabi: فارس شفیع; born 2 November 1987) is a Pakistani rapper, songwriter and actor.

Performing in Urdu, English and Punjabi, Faris is known for his lyrics that can be personal as well as political, and is considered one of the pioneers of Urdu rap in Pakistan.

== Early life and education ==
He is the son of actress Saba Hameed and Syed Pervaiz Shafi, and brother of musician Meesha Shafi.

Faris did his early education from Lahore Grammar School.

== Filmography ==
=== Television series ===
Year	Title	Role	Singer	Network	Note
2012	Mere Huzoor	Abdul Mateen		Express Entertainment	Supporting role
2012	Man Jali	Ramis		Geo Entertainment	Leading role
2013	Kabhi Kabhi	Sunny		ARY Digital	Supporting role
2013	Qarz			ARY Digital	Supporting role
2016	Kitni Girhain Baaki Hain (season 2)			Hum TV	Anthology series
2017	Sun Yaara	Saif ur Rehman		ARY Digital	Leading role
2017	Andaaz-e-Sitam	Salman		Urdu 1	Leading role
2017	Be Inteha	Ali		Urdu 1	Supporting role
2018	Kabhi Band Kabhi Baja			Express Entertainment	Anthology series
2018	Meri Guriya	Yawar		ARY Digital	Supporting role
2019	Ghalati	Sohail		ARY Digital	Supporting role
2024	Faraar	Chaudhry Bali	Yes	Green Entertainment	Supporting role; also sung Waris Shah's poem Heer Akhiya Jogiya in Episode 9

=== Webseries ===
Year	Title	Role	Network	Note
2020	Churails	Abdullah	Zindagi	Guest role in Episodes 8 & 9

=== Film ===
Year	Title	Role	Note
2022	The Legend of Maula Jatt	Mooda	

== Discography ==
=== Singles ===
- "Jawaab De"
- "Cricket Khidaiye"
- "Hum"
- "Sab Sitaray Humaray" (#HBLPSL8)

Introduction NAzar Molotov

=== Coke Studio Pakistan ===
- "Muaziz Saarif" (season 14)
- "Yeh Dunya" (season 14)
- "Blockbuster" (season 15)

=== Films ===
- "Love Guru" – Love Guru (2025)
