= Hira Umer =

Pakistani actress and model (born 1996)

- Born: 26 September 1999 (age 26) lahore, Pakistan
- Education: Master of Business Administration
- Occupation: Actress‚ Model
- Years active: 2020 – present

Hira Umer is a Pakistani actress and model. She is better known for her roles in ARY Digital's drama serials Mere Humsafar and Jaisay Aapki Marzi. She also played the role of Iqra Aziz's cousin in ARY Digital's drama serial "Burns Road Kay Romeo Juliet". In 2021, she paired opposite Faizan Shaikh for a lead role in Pakistan's first horror-comedy feature film Udham Pathak. She has played supporting role in Geo Entertainment's Aye Musht-E-Khaak. Besides acting, she has appeared in reality shows like The Mazedar Show and Kiya Karega Qazi.

Besides acting, Hira has appeared in several TV commercials for international and local brands and ramp walk for several designers.

== Filmography ==
=== Television ===
Year	Title	Role	Notes
2021	Aye Musht-E-Khaak	Rida	Supporting role
2022	Dikhawa Season 2	Sania	Lead role in Ehsas a
2022	Mere Humsafar	Maryam Nafees Ahmed	Supporting role
2023	Jaisay Aapki Marzi	Ramza	Supporting role
2023	Ahsaas	Zoya	Lead role
2024	Burns Road Kay Romeo Juliet	Zara	Supporting role
