= The Reluctant Fundamentalist (film) =

2012 film by Mira Nair

- Theatrical release poster
- Directed by: Mira Nair
- Screenplay by: William Wheeler
- Story by: Mohsin Hamid; Ami Boghani
- Based on: The Reluctant Fundamentalist by Mohsin Hamid
- Produced by: Lydia Dean Pilcher
- Starring: Riz Ahmed; Kate Hudson; Liev Schreiber; Kiefer Sutherland; Om Puri; Shabana Azmi; Haluk Bilginer
- Cinematography: Declan Quinn
- Edited by: Shimit Amin
- Music by: Michael Andrews
- Production companies: Doha Film Institute; Mirabai Films; Cine Mosaic
- Distributed by: IFC Films (United States); PVR Pictures (India)
- Release dates: 29 August 2012 (Venice Film Festival); 26 April 2013 (United States); 17 May 2013 (India); 24 May 2013 (Pakistan)
- Running time: 130 minutes
- Countries: United States; India; Qatar
- Languages: English; Urdu
- Budget: $15 million
- Box office: $2.1 million

The Reluctant Fundamentalist is a 2013 American political thriller drama film directed by Mira Nair and starring Riz Ahmed, Kate Hudson, and Liev Schreiber. It is based on the 2007 novel of the same name by Mohsin Hamid. The film is a post-9/11 story about the impact of the terrorist attacks on one Pakistani man and his treatment by Americans in reaction to them.

In 2007, Nair read the manuscript of Hamid's unpublished novel. After reading it, she decided to make a film. Her production house, Mirabai Films, and Nair's long-time partner, producer Lydia Dean Pilcher's production company, Cine Mosaic, optioned the film rights to the novel.

The film premiered as the opening film for the 69th Venice International Film Festival, and at the 37th Toronto International Film Festival. The film had a limited release in the United States on 26 April 2013, by IFC Films. In Pakistan, the film was released in Urdu with a changed title as Changez on 24 May 2013. The film also screened at the 31st Munich International Film festival. The film won the "Centenary Award" at the 43rd International Film Festival of India. The film received mixed reviews from critics and was a box-office bomb, earning only $2.1 million worldwide on a $15 million budget. The film received several awards, many of them honoring the film's efforts to address tolerance and xenophobia.

== Plot ==
Anse Rainier, an American professor at Lahore University, is kidnapped and held for ransom. Bobby Lincoln, an American journalist in Pakistan, arranges to interview Rainier's colleague Changez Khan, who he suspects is involved in the kidnapping.

Meeting Lincoln at a café, Changez declares his admiration for America's equal opportunities for economic advancement. The movie then shows Khan's earlier life: His father is a respected poet, but money was always difficult for the family and Changez was only able to attend Princeton University on a scholarship. After graduating, he joins a top Wall Street valuation firm, Underwood Samson, and starts a relationship with an American photographer, Erica.

In Manila on business during the September 11 attacks, Changez returns to the US and is quickly picked out, then invasively strip-searched at the airport, leaving him furious at being unfairly treated. Leaving work, he is mistakenly arrested and interrogated by federal agents. His relationship with Erica is strained, largely because she feels responsible for the death of her former boyfriend in a drunk-driving crash and still feels as though she is cheating on him. At the opening of Erica's art show, Changez is angered to discover she has used intimate details of their relationship in her art, and breaks up with her.

Valuating a publishing house in Istanbul, Changez learns the firm is financially worthless, but when given a published copy of his father's poems, he is surprised to learn from the firm's owner that they were translated into Turkish. He has a change of heart and refuses to close down the company, infuriating his boss and mentor Jim Cross. Changez resigns from Underwood Samson.

During his interview with Lincoln, Changez says he was approached by a terrorist cell to become a mujahid and was tempted to accept, angry and disillusioned by "the arrogance, the blindness, the hypocrisy" of the US. He refused when told about the "fundamental truths" of the Quran, echoing a phrase from Jim Cross during their first encounter, "focusing on the fundamentals". Changez explains that both Islamic fundamentalists and blind capitalists like Underwood Samson similarly simplify and exploit people for their own means.

Changez's visa expires and he returns home to Lahore and is hired as a university lecturer, as departing foreign professors have left vacancies. He voices dissatisfaction with US intrusions in Pakistan, bringing him to the attention of the authorities, who raid his office and home, threatening his family. Lincoln is seen nearby, and Changez reveals that he knows Lincoln is working for the CIA, having taken a photograph of him surveilling when Changez's office was raided previously.

As Lincoln and Changez talk in the café, protestors gather outside, and Lincoln is pressured by his superiors to learn Rainier's location and complete "turning his target". The protests grow hostile, and Changez mentions he has heard of a butcher shop and discloses the address of a possible location. Contact is lost before the information can be phoned to Lincoln's fellow operatives.

Changez raises Lincoln's suspicions by texting, but says he was communicating with his sister, Bina. Furious at receiving a picture of Rainier, dead, Lincoln blames Changez and demands to see his phone. Holding Changez at gunpoint, Lincoln uses him as a shield to push his way through the crowd. However, Lincoln is charged by one of the protesters and falls, accidentally shooting and killing Changez's "brother" Sameer. Another student fires at Lincoln, wounding him. Lincoln is quickly extracted by CIA agents, who have learned Rainier was found dead that morning, and that Changez had told them the truth about having no involvement in it. Checking his phone, he confirms the text was indeed sent to his sister.

Changez delivers a eulogy at Sameer's funeral, as Lincoln recuperates in a hospital, recalling Changez's words as he listens to the recording of the interview—"Looks can be deceiving. I am a lover of America... although I was raised to feel very Pakistani..."

== Cast ==
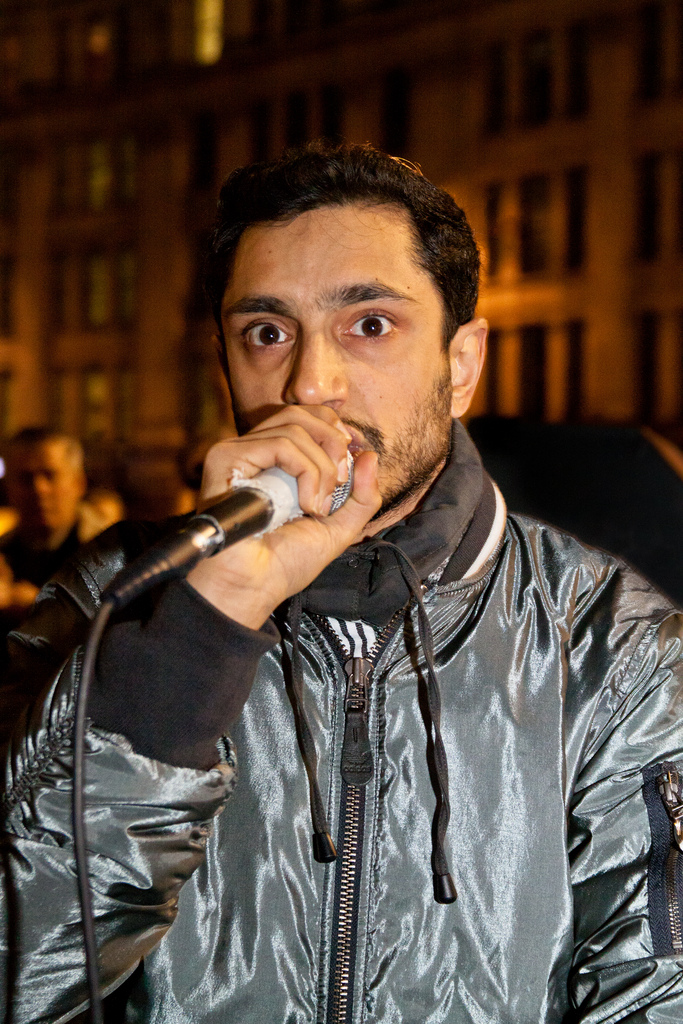
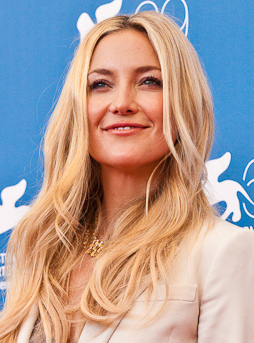
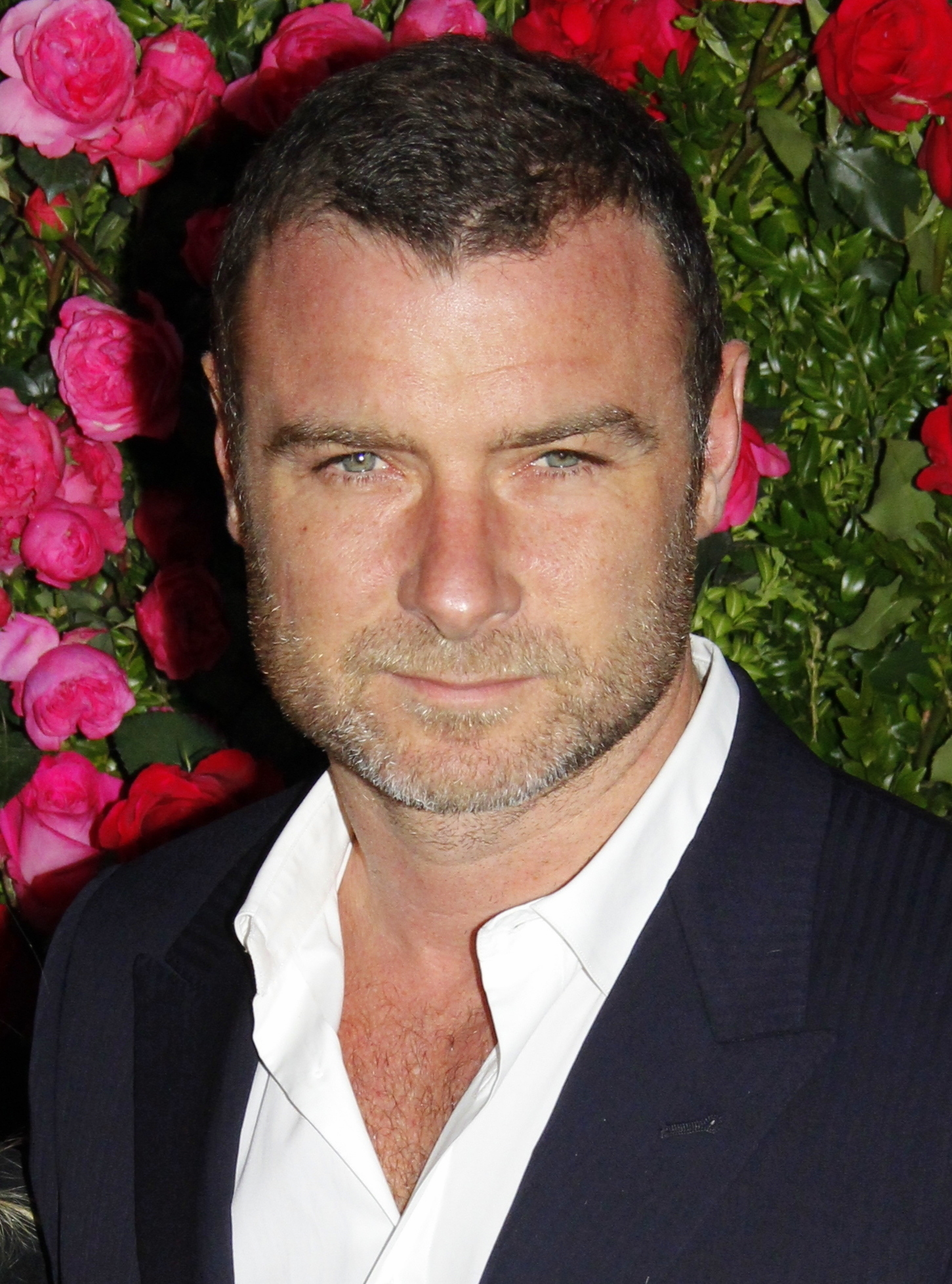
Riz Ahmed, Kate Hudson, and Liev Schreiber
- Riz Ahmed as Changez Khan
- Kate Hudson as Erica
- Liev Schreiber as Bobby Lincoln
- Kiefer Sutherland as Jim Cross
- Om Puri as Abu Khan, Changez's father
- Shabana Azmi as Mrs. Khan, Changez's mother
- Meesha Shafi as Bina Khan, Changez's sister
- Martin Donovan as Ludlow Cooper, a CIA officer and investigator
- Adil Hussain as Mustafa Fazil, a Muslim Activist and Mujahid
- Imaad Shah as Sameer Khan, an academic intern at Lahore University
- Chandrachur Singh as Bandy Uncle
- Ashwath Bhatt as Junaid
- Haluk Bilginer as Nazmi Kemal
- Nelsan Ellis as Wainwright
- Christopher Nicholas Smith as Mike Rizzo
- Victor Slezak as Underwood
- Clayton Landey as Agent Jackson
- Roy McCrerey as Agent Ford
- Mark Oliver as an Immigration Officer
- Steven Kulesza as Shredder No. 1
- Kevin Miller as Shredder No. 2
- Javed Basu-Kesselman as Pakistani James Bond
- Ankur Chatterjee as Pakistani Cab Driver No. 1
- Ritwik Chatterjee as Pakistani Cab Driver No. 2
- Sonya Jehan as Nadia
- Gary Richardson as Anse Rainier, an American professor

== Music ==
The soundtrack album for The Reluctant Fundamentalist was composed by Michael Andrews. On selecting Andrews, Nair said: "I called him up from Delhi. We didn't waste time and were very direct. I asked him how far east he had traveled and he said, 'San Diego!' And I just started laughing." He layered the film's score with traditional Pakistani songs.

The album has Urdu poetry set to music, Pakistani pop, funk and rap music, vocals from Amy Ray of the folk group Indigo Girls, and a new original song from Peter Gabriel, an old friend of Nair's. The film uses an eight-minute duet called "Kangna", sung by Fareed Ayaz and Abu Mohammed, for the opening scene. Songs based on the poems of Faiz Ahmed Faiz were used in the film and performed by Atif Aslam and Michael Andrews (English lyrics). Mira said: "His poems are put to music and we composed new versions of his poems. I went back to Pakistan and found Atif Aslam, who is the nation's biggest pop star."

On composing music for the film, Andrews said: "She has great relationships with folks in the region, and because I was so far away, Mira took care of it. I sent her my music to be overdubbed with melodies represented and she actually recorded Bansuri flute, and also took care of the vocals on 'Mori Araj Suno'. Simultaneously, I added Alam Khan, Ali Akbar's son, and Salar Nadir. Then I put the tracks under the vocal and the orchestra under the mock-up and real Bansuri." This all took place over the Internet, through endless uploading and downloading. "Most of our discussions took place after Mira had worked a 16-hour day."

Andrews served as the primary composer for the music, but some of the songs and music were composed by others. Atif Aslam, Fareed Ayaz, Fahad Humayun, Abu Muhammad, and Amy Ray also served as singers and secondary composers on the album. Nair cast the popular Pakistani singer Meesha Shafi to play the role of Changez's sister, who sings "Bijli Aaye Ya Na Aaye".

The soundtrack was released on Amazon for digital download on 30 April 2013. Internationally, Knitting Factory has released the soundtrack album. In India, Universal Music Group India hold the rights to release the music. Both physical and digital formats of the album were released on 30 April 2013, exclusively on Universal Music.

== Release ==
=== Initial screening ===
IFC Films and Cathay-Keris Films co-financed The Reluctant Fundamentalist, with IFC Films handling the North American distribution and Cathay handling the international release. The film had its premieres at 69th Venice International Film Festival and at the 37th Toronto International Film Festival in late 2012. In Venice, Nair said she hoped the film reflected the fact that "the modern Pakistan is nothing like what you read in the papers" and that she hoped to bring "some sense of bridge-making, some sense of healing, basically a sense of communication that goes beyond the stereotype".

=== Worldwide screening ===
The film screened in festivals in the United States, Denmark, Venice, Toronto, London, Sweden, and Munich in early 2013. It was released in the United States on 26 April 2013, in India and Canada on 17 May 2013, and in the United Kingdom on 19 May 2013. In Pakistan, the film was released in Urdu as Changez on 24 May by Express Entertainment.

== Reception ==
=== Box office ===
The Reluctant Fundamentalist earned $30,920 in its opening weekend in limited release in the United States, and went on to gross a total of $528,731. Its worldwide gross was $2,167,020. In India, the film was released in 300 theaters by PVR Limited and grossed $273,299. In its opening weekend in Sweden, the gross revenue was $12,286.

=== Critical response ===
The Reluctant Fundamentalist received mixed reviews from critics. On Rotten Tomatoes the film has a 56% approval rating based on 99 reviews. The website's critical consensus reads: "The Reluctant Fundamentalist is technically proficient with solid acting and cinematography, but its message is so ambitious and heavy-handed that some of its power is robbed." On Metacritic, it has a weighted average score of 54 out of 100, based on reviews from 28 critics, indicating "mixed or average" reviews.

J.R. Jones of Chicago Reader said, "This sure-handed adaptation of Mohsin Hamid's international best seller shows Nair at her best." Vaihayasi Pande Daniel for Rediff.com gave three-and-a-half out of five stars and says "The Reluctant Fundamentalist has its cinematic moments but is too simplistic in places". Peter Bradshaw in The Guardian gave it three out of five stars and commented, "Its message might be flabby, but Mira Nair's adaptation of Mohsin Hamid's novel is still a bold piece of global storytelling".

Rummana Ahmed from Yahoo! Movies gave a score of four out of five stating, "Mira Nair takes on the daunting task of adapting Mohsin Hamid's The Reluctant Fundamentalist and skillfully transforms a monologue into an engaging plot. She weaves an elaborate tale, infusing it with warmth and texture." Damon Wise of Empire rated the film as three out of five and said, "Ahmed excels and the set-up is compelling but ultimately this is middle rank stuff from the Monsoon Wedding director".

Mohar Basu of Koimoi also rated the film three out of five stars and says: "What's Good: The film preserves the mood of Mohsin Hamid's book well. What's Bad: A jerky screenplay ruptures the film's flow multiple times all through. Watch or Not?: Mira Nair's repertoire glistening with gems like Namesake and Monsoon Wedding is enough to evoke interest. However, The Reluctant Fundamentalist is not even close to being among her best works. With issues left unexplored and characters abandoned abruptly, the film is a desirable watch only for the landmark performance of Riz Ahmed and the grace with which he builds his character."

For the academic reception of the adaptation of The Reluctant Fundamentalist, see Mendes and Bennett (2016) and Lau and Mendes (2018), who question "how the ambivalence and provocativeness of the 'source' text translates into the film adaptation, and the extent to which the film format makes the narrative more palatable and appealing to wider audiences as compared to the novel's target readership."

=== Accolades ===
The Reluctant Fundamentalist won the Audience Favorite—World Cinema award at 2012 Mill Valley Film Festival, while Nair was honored with the Mill Valley Film Festival Award that year.

The Reluctant Fundamentalist won the 1st Centenary Award at 43rd International Film Festival of India.

The Reluctant Fundamentalist won Truly Moving Picture Award at the 2013 Heartland Film Festival.

The Reluctant Fundamentalist won Best Film of the Bernhard Wicki Film Award at the 2013 Munich Film Festival.

The Reluctant Fundamentalist won Best Narrative Feature of the Audience Awards at the 2013 CAAMFest.

In 2013, Nair won The Bridge, the German Film Award for Peace, for The Reluctant Fundamentalist. The award is given to film artists whose work builds bridges and inspires tolerance and humanitarianism.
