= Hania (TV series) =

Pakistani television series

- Title screen
- Written by: Nadeem Shamraiz
- Directed by: Qasim Ali Mureed
- Country of origin: Pakistan
- Original language: Urdu
- No. of episodes: 27

Production
- Producers: Humayun Saeed; Shahzad Nasib
- Camera setup: Multi-camera setup
- Production company: Six Sigma Plus

Original release
- Network: ARY Digital
- Release: 21 February – 31 August 2019

Hania is a 2019 Pakistani thriller drama television series, produced by Humayun Saeed and Shahzad Nasib under their banner Six Sigma Plus. It features Junaid Khan as Junaid, Osama Tahir as Rohaan and Zoya Nasir as Hania in lead.

The series was earlier titled Adhoori Kahani, but was later renamed as Hania. It revolves around mysterious events happening in Junaid Shah's house. It also focuses on domestic violence against women through focusing on Hania's husband. It is based on real-life situations depicting how girls and women are victimized by the people around them.

== Cast ==
- Junaid Khan as Junaid Shah (Dead)
- Zoya Nasir as Hania Junaid/Rohan
- Ghana Ali as Maira; Younger sister of Hania
- Osama Tahir as Rohan
- Atiqa Odho as Saira; Rohan's mother
- Nayyar Ejaz as Vohra Sahab; Junaid's illegal business partner
- Mariam Mirza as Junaid's mother
- Waseem Abbas as Ahsan; Hania and Maira's father
- Ismat Iqbal as Jameela; Hania's mother
- Firdous Jamal as Fareed; Rohan's father
- Hassan Ahmed as Kazim; A police officer and a close friend of Hania's father
