= Meesha Shafi =

Pakistani actress, model and a singer

- میشا شفیع
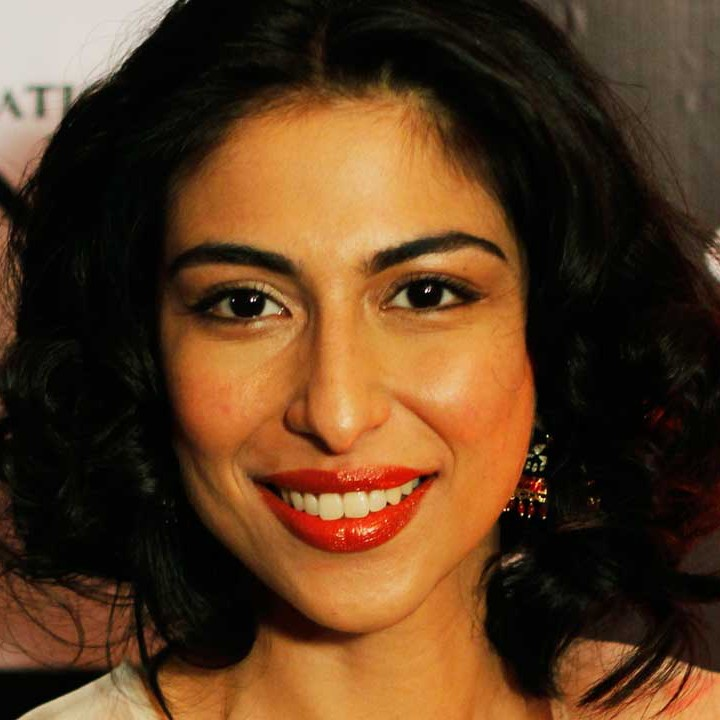
- Born: 1 December 1981 (age 44); Lahore, Punjab, Pakistan
- Other name: Meera Shafi (Note: Legal name)
- Citizenship: Canadian; Pakistani
- Occupations: Singer; Actress; Model
- Parent(s): Saba Hameed (mother); Syed Pervaiz Shafi (father)
- Relatives: Saba Hameed (mother); Faris Shafi (Brother); Hameed Akhtar (maternal grandfather)
- Musical career
- Instrument: Vocals
- Years active: 2009 – present
- Labels: Coke Studio Pakistan; Strings (band)

Meesha Shafi (Note: Urdu: میشا شفیع) is a Pakistani-born Canadian singer, actress and model.

She made her film debut with a supporting role in the 2013 Mira Nair film The Reluctant Fundamentalist. She achieved further critical success for her role as Laxmi, an operative of the Indian spy agency Research and Analysis Wing, in Bilal Lashari's action thriller film Waar, which ranks among the highest-grossing Pakistani films of all time.

== Early life ==
Shafi was born in Lahore, Pakistan 1981 to actress Saba Hameed and Syed Pervaiz Shafi. She did her A Levels from Lahore Grammar School and graduated with a degree in fine arts from the National College of Arts in 2007. In 2016, Shafi became a Canadian citizen.

== Career ==
=== Modelling ===
Shafi entered the modelling industry at the age of 17, when she starred opposite Jawad Ahmed in the music video for the song "Bin Teray Kya Hai Jeena". In 2009 Shafi became the brand ambassador for L'Oreal Paris Pakistan. She has featured in many Pakistani magazines and in international publications such as L'Officiel and Vogue India.

=== Acting ===
Shafi made her screen debut with the 2006 serial Muhabbat Khawab Ki Soorat on Hum TV. She then appeared in Geo TV serial Ye Zindagi To Woh Nahi in 2007.

She made her film debut with Mira Nair's 2012 Hollywood film, The Reluctant Fundamentalist (based on Mohsin Hamid's novel of the same name), alongside Kate Hudson and Riz Ahmed. The film describes the bad impact of Americans toward Muslims after 9/11. Shafi had a minor role and appeared in only two scenes in the film, in the role of the male lead's sister. The film received mixed reviews from critics, and failed to break even at the box office.

She then acted in Bilal Lashari's Pakistani film Waar, alongside Shaan Shahid. Her portrayal of Laxmi, an Indian spy agency Research and Analysis Wing's operative was critically praised by the Pakistani media. The movie won her the 'Best Supporting Actress' award at the ARY Film Awards in 2014.

In 2016, Shafi had a lead role in the TV costume drama Mor Mahal which is set in the mid-19th century.

In 2023, Shafi appeared in the film Mustache, which premiered at the South by Southwest film festival.

=== Music career ===
Shafi started her singing career with the band Overload with her husband, but left in 2011. Shafi sang along with the internationally acclaimed folk singer Arif Lohar on Coke Studio Pakistan Season 3, with the song "Alif Allah (Jugni)". The single, originally composed and performed by Lohar, gathered over 20 million+ views on YouTube, was the most-viewed Coke Studio song ever, until it was overtaken by "Tajdaar-e-Haram", and was used in several films like Cocktail, Diary of a Butterfly and Jugni.

She sang a rendition of the folk song "Chori Chori", which received mixed reviews. She returned to Coke Studio (Season 5) in 2012 when she sang "Ishq Aap Bhi Awalla" with the Chakwalees and sang a ghazal by Faiz Ahmad Faiz, "Dasht-e-Tanhai".

In 2014, Meesha Shafi returned to the Coke Studio floor for a third time to perform "Sun Ve Balori" with the composer and tabla guru Ustad Tafu and producers Strings.

In 2015, Meesha Shafi lent her vocals to two OSTs. One being 'EVA' that was produced by Strings is featured on the soundtrack of the film Moor, released in August 2015, and directed by director Jami.

In August 2015, she released 'Mehram Dilaan De Mahi' for the OST of the biopic (directed and portrayed on screen by Sarmad Khoosat), based on the life and works of prose writer, Manto. The track is produced by True Brew Records and the lyrics are by Punjabi poet Shiv Kumar Batalvi. 'Manto' was released on 11 September 2015.

=== TV appearance ===
In April 2013, Shafi joined Strings, Ali Azmat, Shahzad Hasan and Alamgir as a judge and mentor on the singing talent show Cornetto Music Icons, aired on ARY Digital.

In July 2017, Meesha Shafi joined Fawad Khan and Farooq Ahmed in the audition round as judge while Khan, Shafi, Atif Aslam and Shahi Hasan were the judges in the knockout round of Pepsi Battle of the Bands Season 2. Ayesha Omer is the host of the season.[12]

Shafi also went on to judge Season 3 and 4 of Pepsi Battle of the Bands!

== Personal life ==
Shafi's maternal grandfather, Hameed Akhtar, was a novelist and newspaper columnist, president of the Progressive Writers' Movement, and editor of Urdu daily newspapers including Imroz and Nawa-e-Waqt. In 2008, she married musician Mahmood Rahman. The couple have two children, a daughter named Janevi, and a son named Kazimir.

== Ali Zafar case ==
On 19 April 2018, Shafi accused fellow singer Ali Zafar of sexual harassment on Twitter. More women came in Shafi's support and accused Zafar of misconduct. Zafar categorically denied the allegations and filed a legal defamation suit. Reported as a "high-profile" case, it was ruled in Zafar's favour on 31 March 2026, and Shafi was ordered to pay Rs. 50 lakh in damages. Meanwhile, other cases that were filed include Shafi's workplace harassment case, Zafar's cybercrime case, and two counter-defamation suits against Zafar. While Zafar's legal team claimed that no other case can be pending due to the verdict covering everything, Shafi's legal team filed an appeal against the verdict.

== Acting career ==
=== Filmography ===
Year	Film	Role	Language	Note
2013	The Reluctant Fundamentalist	Bina Khan	English	
2013	Bhaag Milkha Bhaag	Perizaad	Hindi	
2013	Waar	Zoya / Laxmi	Urdu; English	ARY Film Award for Best Supporting Actress
2023	Mustache	Asiya	English; Urdu	

=== TV ===
Year	Show	Role	Language	Note
2016	Mor Mahal	Farrukh Zaad	Urdu	

== Discography ==
Year	Title
2009	Pichal Pairee
2012	The Reluctant Fundamentalist

=== Coke Studio songs ===
Year	Song	Notes
2010	"Chori Chori"	Originally sung by Reshma
2010	"Alif Allah"	Performed with Arif Lohar
2012	"Dasht-e-Tanhai	Originally sung by Iqbal Bano
2012	"Ishq Aap Bhe Awalla"	Performed with Chakwal Group
2014	"Sunn Ve Balori"	Originally sung by Noor Jehan
2014	"Jugni"	Originally sung by Alam Lohar
2016	"Aa Rahe Haq Ka Shaheedo"	Originally sung by Naseem Begum
2016	"Bholay Bhalay"	
2016	"Aya Lariye"	
2020	"Gal Sunn"	
2020	"Na Tutteya Ve"	
2022	"Muaziz Shaarif"	

=== Lollywood ===
Year	Song	Film	Composer
2015	EVA	Moor	Strings
2016	Sun Vey Bilori	Shaan-e-Ishq	Amir Munawar
2017	24/7 Lak Hilna	Punjab Nahi Jaongi	Shani Arshad
2022	Mahiya Ve Mahiya	London Nahi Jaunga	Shani Arshad

Pepsi Battle of the Bands

Year	Season	Song	Notes
2017	2	"Speaker Phaar"	
2018	3	"Koi Sarda Aye Te Sare"	Originally sung by Noor Jehan
2018	3	"Mein"	
2019	4	"Leela"	

=== Velo Sound Station Songs ===
Year	Song	Notes
2020	"Boom Boom"	Originally sung by Nazia Hassan
2020	"Amrit"	
2023	"Saranjaam"	

=== Miscellaneous Songs ===
Year	Song	Notes
2020	“Sakal Ban”	Written by Amir Khusrau
2021	“Hot Mango Chutney Sauce”	
2022	“Rajkumari”	

== See also ==
- Coke Studio
- List of Pakistani models
- List of Pakistani actresses
