= Mohsin Hamid =

British Pakistani writer

Mohsin Hamid محسن حامد
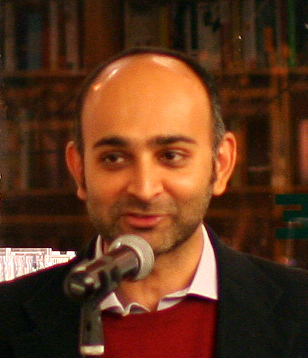
- Born: 23 July 1971 (age 55); Lahore, Pakistan
- Education: Princeton University; Harvard Law School
- Occupation: Novelist
- Spouse: Zahra
- Children: Dina, Vali
- Writing career
- Period: 2000–present
- Genre: Literary fiction
- Notable works: Moth Smoke; The Reluctant Fundamentalist; Exit West
- Mohsin Hamid's voice from the BBC programme Front Row, 24 April 2013
- Website: mohsinhamid.com

Mohsin Hamid (Urdu: محسن حامد; born 23 July 1971) is a British Pakistani novelist, writer and brand consultant. His novels are Moth Smoke (2000), The Reluctant Fundamentalist (2007), How to Get Filthy Rich in Rising Asia (2013), Exit West (2017), and The Last White Man (2022).

== Early life and education ==
Born to a family of Punjabi and Kashmiri descent, Hamid spent part of his childhood in the United States, where he stayed from the age of 3 to 9 while his father, now a university professor, was enrolled in a PhD program at Stanford University. He then moved with his family back to Lahore, Pakistan, and attended the Lahore American School.

At the age of 18, Hamid returned to the United States to continue his education. He graduated summa cum laude with an A.B. from the Princeton School of Public and International Affairs in 1993 after completing a 127-page senior thesis, titled "Sustainable Power: Integrated Resource Planning in Pakistan", under the supervision of Robert H. Williams. While he was a student at Princeton, Hamid studied under Joyce Carol Oates and Toni Morrison. Hamid wrote the first draft of his first novel for a fiction workshop taught by Morrison. He returned to Pakistan after college to continue working on it.

Hamid then attended Harvard Law School, graduating in 1997. Finding corporate law boring, he repaid his student loans by working for several years as a management consultant at McKinsey & Company in New York City. He was allowed to take three months off each year to write, and he used this time to complete his first novel Moth Smoke.

== Work ==
Hamid moved to London in the summer of 2001, initially intending to stay only one year. Although he frequently returned to Pakistan to write, he continued to live in London for eight years, becoming a dual citizen of the United Kingdom in 2006. In 2004 he joined the brand consultancy Wolff Olins, working only three days a week so as to retain time to write. He later served as managing director of Wolff Olins' London office, and in 2015 was appointed the firm's first-ever Chief Storytelling Officer.

Hamid's first novel, Moth Smoke, tells the story of a marijuana-smoking ex-banker in post-nuclear-test Lahore who falls in love with his best friend's wife and becomes a heroin addict. It was published in 2000, and quickly became a cult hit in Pakistan and India. It was also a finalist for the PEN/Hemingway Award given to the best first novel in the US. It was adapted for television in Pakistan and as an operetta in Italy.

Moth Smoke had an innovative structure, using multiple voices, second-person trial scenes, and essays on such topics as the role of air-conditioning in the lives of its main characters. Pioneering a hip, contemporary approach to English language South Asian fiction, it was considered by some critics to be "the most interesting novel that came out of [its] generation of subcontinent (English) writing." In the New York Review of Books, Anita Desai noted:

One could not really continue to write, or read about, the slow seasonal changes, the rural backwaters, gossipy courtyards, and traditional families in a world taken over by gun-running, drug-trafficking, large-scale industrialism, commercial entrepreneurship, tourism, new money, nightclubs, boutiques... Where was the Huxley, the Orwell, the Scott Fitzgerald, or even the Tom Wolfe, Jay McInerney, or Brett Easton Ellis to record this new world? Mohsin Hamid's novel Moth Smoke, set in Lahore, is one of the first pictures we have of that world.

His second novel, The Reluctant Fundamentalist, told the story of a Pakistani man who decides to leave his high-flying life in America after a failed love affair and the terrorist attacks of 9/11. It was published in 2007 and became a million-copy international best seller, reaching No.4 on the New York Times Best Seller list. The novel was shortlisted for the Booker Prize, won several awards including the Anisfield-Wolf Book Award and the Asian American Literary Award, and was translated into over 25 languages. The Guardian selected it as one of the books that defined the decade.

Like Moth Smoke, The Reluctant Fundamentalist was formally experimental. The novel uses the unusual device of a dramatic monologue in which the Pakistani protagonist continually addresses an American listener who is never heard from directly. (Hamid has said The Fall by Albert Camus served as his model.) According to one commentator, because of this technique:

maybe we the readers are the ones who jump to conclusions; maybe the book is intended as a Rorschach to reflect back our unconscious assumptions. In our not knowing lies the novel's suspense... Hamid literally leaves us at the end in a kind of alley, the story suddenly suspended; it's even possible that some act of violence might occur. But more likely, we are left holding the bag of conflicting worldviews. We're left to ponder the symbolism of Changez having been caught up in the game of symbolism—a game we ourselves have been known to play.

In an interview in May 2007, Hamid said of the brevity of The Reluctant Fundamentalist: "I'd rather people read my book twice than only half-way through."

How to Get Filthy Rich in Rising Asia, was excerpted by The New Yorker in their 24 September 2012 issue and by Granta in their Spring 2013 issue, and was released in March 2013 by Riverhead Books. As with his previous books, How to Get Filthy Rich in Rising Asia bends conventions of both genre and form. Narrated in the second person, it tells the story of the protagonist's ("your") journey from impoverished rural boy to tycoon in an unnamed contemporary city in "rising Asia," and of his pursuit of the nameless "pretty girl" whose path continually crosses but never quite converges with his. Stealing its shape from the self-help books devoured by ambitious youths all over "rising Asia," the novel is playful but also quite profound in its portrayal of the thirst for ambition and love in a time of shattering economic and social upheaval. In her New York Times review of the novel, Michiko Kakutani called it "deeply moving," writing that How to Get Filthy Rich in Rising Asia "reaffirms [Hamid's] place as one of his generation's most inventive and gifted writers."

Hamid has also written on politics, art, literature, travel, and other topics, most recently on Pakistan's internal division and extremism in an op-ed for the New York Times. His journalism, essays, and stories have appeared in TIME, The Guardian, Dawn, The New York Times, The Washington Post, The International Herald Tribune, the Paris Review, and other publications. In 2013 he was named one of the world's 100 Leading Global Thinkers by Foreign Policy magazine. In 2025, Hamid co-founded the magazine Equator.

Hamid's fourth novel, Exit West (2017), is about a young couple, Nadia and Saeed, and their relationship in a time when the world is taken by storm by migrants. It was shortlisted for the 2017 Booker Prize.

His novels have also been criticised for providing a limited, often one-dimensional representation of Muslim existence, invoking religious symbols/beliefs only to associate them with possibly fundamentalist or terror-sympathising leanings.

== Personal life ==
Hamid moved to Lahore in 2009 with his wife Zahra and their daughter Dina (born on 14 August 2009). He now divides his time between Pakistan and abroad, living between Lahore, New York, and London. Hamid has described himself as a "mongrel" and has said of his writing that "a novel can often be a divided man’s conversation with himself". He is a dual British and Pakistani citizen.

== Bibliography ==
=== Novels ===
- Moth Smoke (2000) ISBN 0-374-21354-2
- The Reluctant Fundamentalist (2007) ISBN 0-241-14365-9
- How to Get Filthy Rich in Rising Asia (2013) ISBN 978-1-59448-729-3
- Exit West (2017) ISBN 978-0-241-97907-5
- The Last White Man (2022) ISBN 978-0-593-53881-4

=== Short fiction ===
Stories (Note: Short stories unless otherwise noted)

Title	Year	First published	Reprinted/collected	Notes
The (Former) General In His Labyrinth	2008	Digitally published through We Tell Stories.		Interactive fiction commissioned by Penguin Books.
The face in the mirror	2022	Hamid, Mohsin (16 May 2022). "The face in the mirror". The New Yorker. 98 (12): 60–67.		

=== Non-fiction ===
- Discontent and Its Civilisations: Despatches from Lahore, New York & London (2014) ISBN 978-0-241-14630-9

———————

== Awards and honours ==
Hamid has personally been rewarded a number of times. In 2013, Foreign Policy named him one of their "100 Leading Global Thinkers." In 2018, he was named a Fellow of the Royal Society of Literature, as well as a Sitara-i-Imtiaz in Pakistan.

Awards and honours for Hamid's writing
Year	Work	Award/Honour	Result	Ref.
2000	Moth Smoke	The New York Times Notable Book of the Year	Selection	
2001	Moth Smoke	Betty Trask Award	Winner	
2001	Moth Smoke	Hemingway Foundation/PEN Award	Shortlist	
2007	The Reluctant Fundamentalist	Booker Prize	Shortlist	
2007	The Reluctant Fundamentalist	New York Times Notable Book of the Year	Selection	
2008	The Reluctant Fundamentalist	Ambassador Book Award of the English Speaking Union	Winner	
2008	The Reluctant Fundamentalist	Anisfield-Wolf Book Award	Winner	
2008	The Reluctant Fundamentalist	Arts Council England Decibel Award	Shortlist	
2008	The Reluctant Fundamentalist	Asian American Literary Award	Winner	
2008	The Reluctant Fundamentalist	Australia-Asia Literary Award	Shortlist	
2008	The Reluctant Fundamentalist	Commonwealth Writers Prize (Eurasia Region, Best Book)	Shortlist	
2008	The Reluctant Fundamentalist	Index on Censorship T R Fyvel Award	Nominee	
2008	The Reluctant Fundamentalist	James Tait Black Memorial Prize for Fiction	Shortlist	
2008	The Reluctant Fundamentalist	South Bank Show Annual Award for Literature	Winner	
2009	The Reluctant Fundamentalist	International Dublin Literary Award	Shortlist	
2009	The Reluctant Fundamentalist	Premio Speciale Dal Testo Allo Schermo		
2013	How to Get Filthy Rich in Rising Asia	DSC Prize for South Asian Literature	Shortlist	
2013	How to Get Filthy Rich in Rising Asia	Tiziano Terzani International Literary Prize	Winner	
2014	How to Get Filthy Rich in Rising Asia	International Literature Award	Shortlist	
2017	Exit West	Kirkus Prize	Shortlist	
2017	Exit West	Booker Prize	Shortlist	
2017	Exit West	Neustadt International Prize for Literature	Shortlist	
2017	Exit West	New York Times Best Book of the Year	Top 10	
2017	Exit West	St. Francis College Literary Prize	Shortlist	
2018	Exit West	Aspen Words Literary Prize	Winner	
2018	Exit West	British Science Fiction Association Award	Shortlist	
2018	Exit West	Dayton Literary Peace Prize	Shortlist	
2018	Exit West	LA Times Book Prize	Winner	
2018	Exit West	National Book Critics Circle Award	Shortlist	
2018	Exit West	Rathbones Folio Prize	Shortlist	

== Further references ==
- article (in Italian). Accessed 4 March 2007
- Houpt, S.: "Novelist by Night", The Globe and Mail, 1 April 2000
- Patel, V.: "A Call to Arms for Pakistan", Newsweek, 24 July 2000
