= Farhad Humayun =

Pakistani singer (1978–2021)

Farhad Humayun فرہاد ہمایوں
- Born: 5 October 1978; Jersey, United Kingdom
- Died: 8 June 2021 (aged 42) Lahore, Pakistan
- Genres: Rock
- Occupations: Singer; Songwriter; Drummer; Percussionist; Composer; Audio engineer
- Instruments: Drums; Percussion; Guitar
- Years active: 2003–2021

Farhad Humayun (Urdu: فرہاد ہمایوں; 5 October 1978 – 8 June 2021) was a Pakistani singer, drummer, record producer and video artist. He was associated with the Pakistani drum jam band Overload which he founded in 2003. Farhad started his career as a drummer with Co-Ven and later forming Mindriot. He worked with artists such as Atif Aslam, Symt, Maha Ali Kazmi and Meesha Shafi. Humayun received many awards and accolades for his work. He was also the owner of Riot Studios, a recording studio and music performance venue in Lahore.

== Early life and education ==
Humayun was born on 5 October 1978 in the British Channel Island of Jersey at the Jersey International Hospital to parents Navid (née Rahman) and Shahzad Humayun. His mother Navid Shahzad is a TV, theatre and film actress, scholar, and academic. She is also a recipient of the Pride of Performance, the highest literary award in Pakistan. His father was an automobile salesman and an award-winning cricket commentator in Pakistan between the 1970s and the 2000s. Humayun's maternal grandfather S. A. Rahman was a Judge at the Supreme Court of Pakistan and then Chief Justice of Pakistan in the 1960s. He was the cousin of musician and political activist Taimur Rahman.

Farhad grew up in the Gulberg area of Lahore and studied at Aitchison College until secondary school. He went to the National College of Arts in Lahore where he earned his bachelor's degree in fine arts in painting between 1997 and 2000. He also studied audio engineering at the Recording Workshop in Ladbroke Grove, London.

== Career ==
Humayun started playing drums at age 14 and was a regular in the underground movement in Lahore, Karachi and Islamabad in the early 1990s. His influences at the time were mostly metal bands, such as Judas Priest, Dio, Black Sabbath, AC/DC. He started as the drummer in the alternative rock band Co-Ven playing some originals but mostly covers by Pearl Jam, Soundgarden, Nirvana, as was the norm at the time when satellite television was catching on in Pakistan. He formed his own metal band in 1994 called Mindriot inspired by the Soundgarden song.

Humayun recorded drums and toured with major Pakistani rock acts such as Noori and Fuzön and also served as the house band drummer for Coke Studio (Pakistani season 5) in 2012. He wrote with and recorded Atif Aslam on his first three albums as well as on Coke Studio. Farhad produced Meri Kahani by Atif Aslam in 2006.

While studying at the National College of Arts, Humayun started casually jamming with friends at events of the college's Western Music Society, of which he was the president. That laid the foundation of one of Pakistan's most iconic and original acts Overload in 2003. The band's mix of the modern (trap) drums set with traditional, mystical Dhol (drum), alternating between Indian Classical beats and Rock became a rage in Pakistan. Overload was a band of choice at fundraisers, celebrations, and cricket matches opening and closing ceremonies, such as the launching ceremony of the Pakistan Super League team Lahore Qalandars. Known as the "loudest band of Pakistan", Overload won numerous awards, including the Lux Style Award for Best Live Act in 2006.

Humayun remains the artist with the most number of nominations for a musician at the Lux Style Awards with 13 nominations and two wins. He was also a successful businessman and owned and ran an entertainment and arts company Riot Productions (subsidiaries Riot Films, Riot Studios). Humayun was also termed as the Pride of Pakistan by a popular newspaper Daily Times (Pakistan). His song Jeet (transl. victory) was played at Prime Minister Imran Khan's rally in Washington D.C in 2019.

== Collaborations ==
Humayun had multiple collaborations with other Pakistan-based artists including Ustad Jaffar, Nasir Sain, Pappu Sain and Tanveer Sain. He also released English singles including Give In produced by Richard Hilton, keyboardist of the band Chic. The songs feature musicians like Tony Levin on bass, David Torn on guitars and Richy Stano also on guitars. Recorded at Clubhouse Studios in Rhinebeck New York, the song was released in 2018. Farhad started his solo career in 2018 and released a number of singles including Murr Ke Dekho and Kambakht with Faiza Mujahid.

== Endorsements ==
Humayun was a brand ambassador for big brands, such as Porsche, Dell, Samsung, Chester Bernard clothing, and telecommunications companies including Mobilink, and Warid. He was featured in the television advertisement for Samsung Galaxy A.

As of 2019, Humayun was the producer for Levi's Live, a project of the Levi Strauss & Co. on the revival of live music in Pakistan. He also produced Pepsi Smash for Pepsi Pakistan.

== Personal life ==
Humayun was married to Asmaa Mumtaz. They were divorced at the time of his death. In October 2018, Farhad was diagnosed with a brain tumor. The singer announced a full recovery the next month after the tumor was removed successfully.

Humayun died on 8 June 2021 of undisclosed causes.

== Awards ==
| Year | Award | Category | Result |
|---|---|---|---|
| 2005 | Indus Music Awards | Best New Artist | Won |
| 2006 | Lux Style Award | Best Live Act | Won |
| 2014 | Lux Style Award | Best Video Director | Won |
| 2014 | Hum TV Award | Song of the Year | Won |
| 2017 | Hum Style Award | Most Stylish Performer of the Year | Won |
