= The Reluctant Fundamentalist =

2007 novel by Mohsin Hamid

- First edition (UK)
- Author: Mohsin Hamid
- Publisher: Hamish Hamilton (United Kingdom); Harcourt (United States); Oxford University Press (Pakistan)
- Publication date: 1 March 2007
- Pages: 224
- ISBN: 0-241-14365-9

The Reluctant Fundamentalist is a "metafictional" novel by Pakistani author Mohsin Hamid, published in 2007.

The novel uses the technique of a frame story, which takes place during the course of a single evening in an outdoor Lahore cafe, where a bearded Pakistani man called Changez tells a nervous American stranger about his love affair with an American woman, and his eventual abandonment of America. A short story adapted from the novel, called "Focus on the Fundamentals", appeared in the fall 2006 issue of The Paris Review. A film adaptation of the novel by director Mira Nair premiered at the 2012 Venice Film Festival.

== Plot ==
The story begins in the streets of Lahore. A Pakistani man, Changez, offers to direct an American visitor where he can find a good cup of tea. As they wait for their tea, Changez begins to weave a long story about his life, especially his time living in the United States – in between making remarks about the history, landmarks and society of Lahore, his native city which he loves and of which he is proud. The unnamed American is restless but remains to listen.

Changez tells the American he was an excellent student who, after completing his bachelor's degree in finance, joined Underwood Samson, a consultancy firm, as an analyst. After graduating from Princeton University, he vacationed in Greece with fellow Princetonians, where he met Erica, an aspiring writer. He was instantly smitten by her, but his feelings remained almost unrequited because she was still grieving over the death of her childhood sweetheart Christopher Zee, who succumbed to lung cancer. After a date, they return to his place and he proceeds to have sex with her, but stops because her emotional attachment to Chris prevents her from becoming aroused. After this incident there is an interlude where neither contacts each other. But soon they go on another date, after which they have sex when Changez convinces Erica to close her eyes and fantasize that she is with Chris. Though Changez is satisfied at this development in their relationship, this irreversibly damages their relationship. Soon she begins treatment in a mental institution. He notices she is physically emaciated and no longer her former self. After this meeting he travels to Chile on an assignment. When he returns to meet her, it is found that she has left the institution and her clothes were found near the Hudson River. Officially she is declared a missing person, as her body has not been found.

In his professional life, he impresses his peers and gets earmarked by his superiors for his work, especially Jim, the person who recruited him, develops a good rapport with him, and holds him in high esteem. This prompts the firm to send him to offshore assignments in the Philippines and Valparaíso, Chile. In Chile, he is very distracted due to developments in the world and, responding to the parabolic suggestion of the publisher his company is there to assess (which would lead to its breakup), he visits the nearby preserved home of the late left-wing poet Pablo Neruda and comes to see himself as a servant of the American empire that has constantly interfered with and manipulated his homeland. He returns from Chile to New York without completing the assignment and ends up losing his job.

Politically, Changez is surprised by his own reaction to the September 11 attacks. "Yes, despicable as it may sound, my initial reaction was to be remarkably pleased", he tells the American. He observes the air of suspicion towards Pakistanis. Changez, due to his privileged position in society, is not among those detained or otherwise abused, but he notices a change in his treatment in public. To express solidarity with his countrymen after his trip to Chile, he starts to grow a beard. After the 2001 Indian Parliament attack, India and Pakistan mobilize leading to a standoff. Noticing the US response to this situation, he has an epiphany that his country is being used as a pawn. With no job, an expiring visa and no reason to stay in the United States, he moves back to Lahore.

After returning to Lahore, he becomes a professor of finance at the local university. His experience and insight in world issues gains his admiration among students. As a result, he becomes a mentor to large groups of students on various issues. He and his students actively participate in demonstrations against policies that were detrimental to the sovereignty of Pakistan. Changez advocates nonviolence, but a relatively unknown student gets apprehended for an assassination attempt on an American representative, which brings the spotlight on Changez. In a widely televised interview, he strongly criticizes the militarism of U.S. foreign policy. This act makes people surrounding him think that someone might be sent to intimidate him or worse.

As they sit in the café, Changez keeps noting that the American stranger is very apprehensive of their surroundings, that he is in possession of a sophisticated satellite phone on which he is repeatedly messaging, and that under his clothing there is a bulge which might be a gun. Changez walks the stranger toward his hotel. As they walk, the American, now highly suspicious that he is in immediate danger, reaches into his pocket, possibly for a gun. Changez says he trusts it is simply his holder of business cards. But the novel ends without revealing what was in his pocket, leaving the reader to wonder if the stranger was a CIA agent, possibly there to kill Changez, or if Changez, in collusion with the waiter from the café, had planned all along to do harm to the American.

== Style ==
The Reluctant Fundamentalist is an example of a dramatic monologue and autodiegetic narration.

== Reception ==
Upon release, it was generally well-received. Globally, Complete Review says "Generally very impressed".

On 5 November 2019, the BBC News listed The Reluctant Fundamentalist on its list of the 100 most influential novels.

=== Awards ===
Awards and honours for The Reluctant Fundamentalist
Year	Award/Honour	Result	Ref.
2007	Booker Prize	Shortlist	
2007	New York Times Notable Book of the Year	Selection	
2008	Ambassador Book Award of the English Speaking Union	Winner	
2008	Anisfield-Wolf Book Award	Winner	
2008	Arts Council England Decibel Award	Shortlist	
2008	Asian American Literary Award	Winner	
2008	Australia-Asia Literary Award	Shortlist	
2008	Commonwealth Writers Prize (Eurasia Region, Best Book)	Shortlist	
2008	Index on Censorship T R Fyvel Award	Nominee	
2008	James Tait Black Memorial Prize for Fiction	Shortlist	
2008	South Bank Show Annual Award for Literature	Winner	
2009	International Dublin Literary Award	Shortlist	
2009	Premio Speciale Dal Testo Allo Schermo		

=== Academic reception ===
In 2007, Davidson College assigned this book to all incoming freshmen as a topic for later discussion during Freshman Orientation. This book kicked off the theme of the school's 2007–08 year, which focused on diversity. The following year, Tulane University gave the novel to all new undergraduates as part of the Tulane University Reading Project. In 2009, the University of St Andrews announced that they would be sending a free copy of The Reluctant Fundamentalist to all of 1,500 new undergraduates as part of a new incentive to "offer students a common topic for discussion and focus energies on reading and intellectual debate". In 2010, Washington University in St. Louis gave the book to each of its incoming freshmen, as a part of the "Freshmen Reading Program." Georgetown University chose this book for incoming freshmen's summer reading. Ursinus College has incorporated the novel into their unique Common Intellectual Experience for freshmen students. Southern Methodist University in Dallas, Texas uses the book in all honors rhetoric classes for first-year students. Drake University in Des Moines, Iowa and Siena College in Loudonville, New York use the novel as an introduction to their First Year Seminar programs. Lehigh University assigned all incoming freshman this novel in 2012. Rollins College has assigned this novel to their incoming freshmen as part of their summer reading program. The University of Evansville in Indiana uses the novel as a tool in the freshman First Year Seminar program. This program has the purpose of engaging incoming first-year students to topics of leadership and citizenship. Bucknell University chose it for the first year common reading for the Class of 2018. The University of Pretoria has this novel as part of the set work and reading list for English 220. CUNY Hunter College's department of English assigns this book in an Asian American literature course for public discourse and a level of understanding of a post-9/11 age in America.

In his critique entitled "Mohsin Hamid Engages the World in The Reluctant Fundamentalist," M. S. E. Madiou goes against mainstream criticism, analyzing the historical and artistic contingencies Mohsin Hamid has faced while writing his novel focusing on 9/11 as one of Hamid's "Eureka" moments that has significantly contributed to the production of his novel.

=== Commercial reception ===
The Reluctant Fundamentalist became a million-copy international best-seller. It reached No. 4 on the New York Times Best Seller list.

== Adaptations ==
BBC Radio 4 began broadcasting an abridged version on 22 August 2011, read by British actor Riz Ahmed.

A film of the same name was directed by Mira Nair and premiered in 2012 also starring Riz Ahmed.
