= Bhoojo to Jeeto =

- بھوجو تو جیتو
- Genre: Game show Fun; Comedy
- Written by: Aleena Lodhi Haroon
- Presented by: Aleena Lodhi Haroon
- Country of origin: Pakistan
- Original language: Urdu
- No. of episodes: 400+

Production
- Producer: M Ahmad Nisar

Original release
- Network: Lahore News
- Release: 2 February 2017 – present

Related
- Inaam Ghar; Jeeto Pakistan

Bhoojo to Jeeto (Urdu: بھوجو تو جیتو) is an Urdu comedy television game show hosted by Aleena Lodhi Haroon that airs at 7:00-8:00 p.m. Thursday through Sunday on Lahore News HD.

Bhoojo to Jeeto is a game show in which the host visits places in Lahore. Participants selected by the host win prizes by answering questions. The participants are allowed to share recipes, jokes, poems and songs.

== Cast ==
- Aleena Haroon Lodhi

== Special episodes ==
- Lahore Zoo Episodes
- Shahi Qila Episodes
- Liberty Market Episodes
- Minar e Pakistan Episodes
- Punjab University Episodes
- Race Course Park
- Amanah Mall

== Awards ==
- Best Show of the Year Award from Lahore News HD
- Achievement Award For Coverage & Participation in the Fun Rang & Rang Event Painting Exhibition at the Alhamra Art Gallery

== Segments of the show ==
Segment No. 1: The host ask questions of the participating individuals or families.

Segment No. 2: The host awards prizes or "gifts" to all participants.

Segment No. 3: The host gives closing sentiments and invites viewers to participate in future episodes.
