= Jeet Ka Dum =

Pakistani television show

- Genre: Game show
- Presented by: Faisal Qureshi
- Country of origin: Pakistan
- Original language: Urdu

Production
- Production location: Karachi

Original release
- Network: Hum TV
- Release: 7 February 2015 – 2016

Jeet Ka Dum (English: Power to Win) is a television game show in Pakistan presented by Hum TV. It was broadcast in 2015 live from Karachi and hosted by actor Faisal Qureshi.

Guests on the show have included Atiqa Odho, Asad Shafiq, Fawad Alam, and Naz Baloch.

This show brings activities and competitions for the families and their children.

== See also ==
- Bazm E Tariq Aziz
- Inaam Ghar
- Inaam Ghar Plus
- Jeeto Pakistan
