= Bazm E Tariq Aziz =

TV show in Pakistan

- Also known as: Nilaam Ghar (1975-1996); Tariq Aziz Show (1997-1999); Bazm-e-Tariq Aziz (2004-2019)
- Genre: Game show
- Created by: Aarif Rana
- Presented by: Tariq Aziz
- Theme music composer: Karim Shahabuddin (1980s)
- Country of origin: Pakistan
- Original language: Urdu

Production
- Producers: Aarif Rana; Hafeez Tahir; Ayub Khawar; Syed Zahid Uzair; Farrukh Bashir; Agha Zulfiqar Farrukh; Agha Qaisar; Tajdar Aadil
- Production locations: Hall No. 2, Alhamra Arts Council, Lahore

Original release
- Network: Pakistan Television Corporation
- Release: 1975 – 2019

Bazm-e-Tariq Aziz (Urdu: بزم طارق عزیز), formerly Nilaam Ghar (Urdu: نیلام گھر) and Tariq Aziz Show (Urdu: طارق عزیز شو), was a quiz-format game show hosted by Tariq Aziz on Pakistan Television Corporation (PTV) which started in 1975 and lasted for several decades.

== History ==
The show started as Nilaam Ghar (Auction House) in 1975. It was the first television show in Pakistan to have mass audience participation, commercial sponsorships for specific questions or question rounds, and extravagant prizes. Major corporations like Hitachi were prominent sponsors of the show.

It was renamed as Tariq Aziz Show in 1997, and in 2004 took the name Bazm-e-Tariq Aziz. The show celebrated its fortieth anniversary in October 2010. In February 2012, it celebrated its 300th episode. It was the oldest television show in Pakistan.

With only a few interruptions, it had continuously run for the last 35 years on PTV and it had been hosted by Tariq Aziz since its first day.

== Format ==
It used many games and formats.

A quiz-format game was used in different ways, asking questions from the random, interested audience and pre-qualified teams. Answering correctly would lead to prizes (household appliances, car, etc.), sponsored by companies.

One significant format was Bait Bazi which is a verbal game and a genre of Urdu poetry played by composing verses of poems.

== Tariq Aziz ==
Tariq Aziz had a unique speaking style. He belonged to Sahiwal but he lived in Lahore. "He is probably the most recognised PTV personality in Pakistan," said former director of public relations and former press attaché to Bangladesh, Mohammed Hussain Malik. "His show in Bangladesh was a complete success. Bengalis who did not know any Urdu watched his show. He did four shows and all were completely sold out."

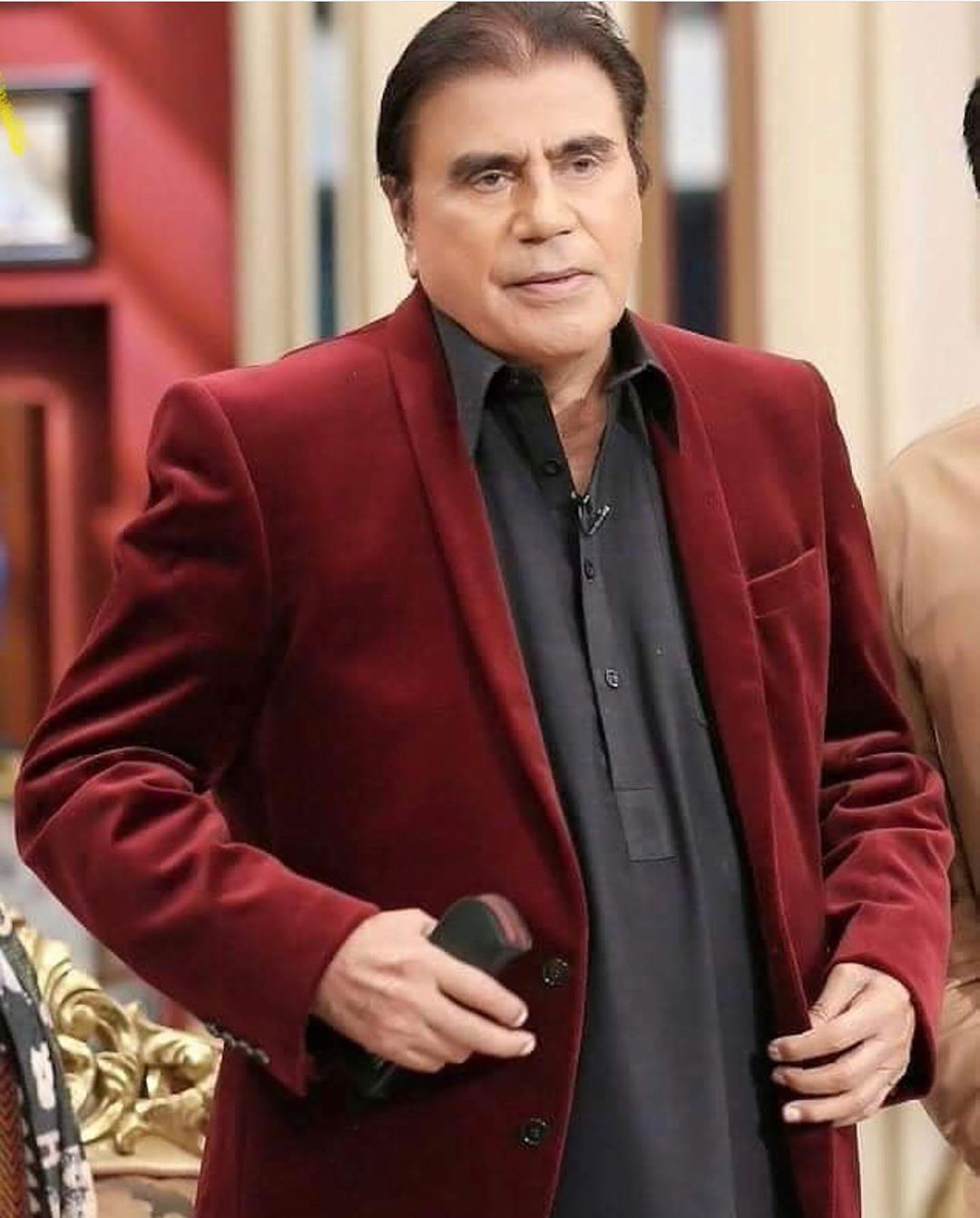
Tariq Aziz

== Production Team ==
Aarif Rana was the creator and the first producer of Nilaam Ghar. Subsequent producers included Hafeez Tahir, Ayub Khawar, Syed Zahid Uzair, Farrukh Bashir, Agha Zulfiqar Farrukh, Agha Qaisar, and Tajdar Aadil.

Karim Shahabuddin served for many years as the music director for the show in the 1980s.

== Production Location ==
It was organised by Pakistan Television Corporation in Hall no. 2 of Alhamra Arts Council, Lahore.

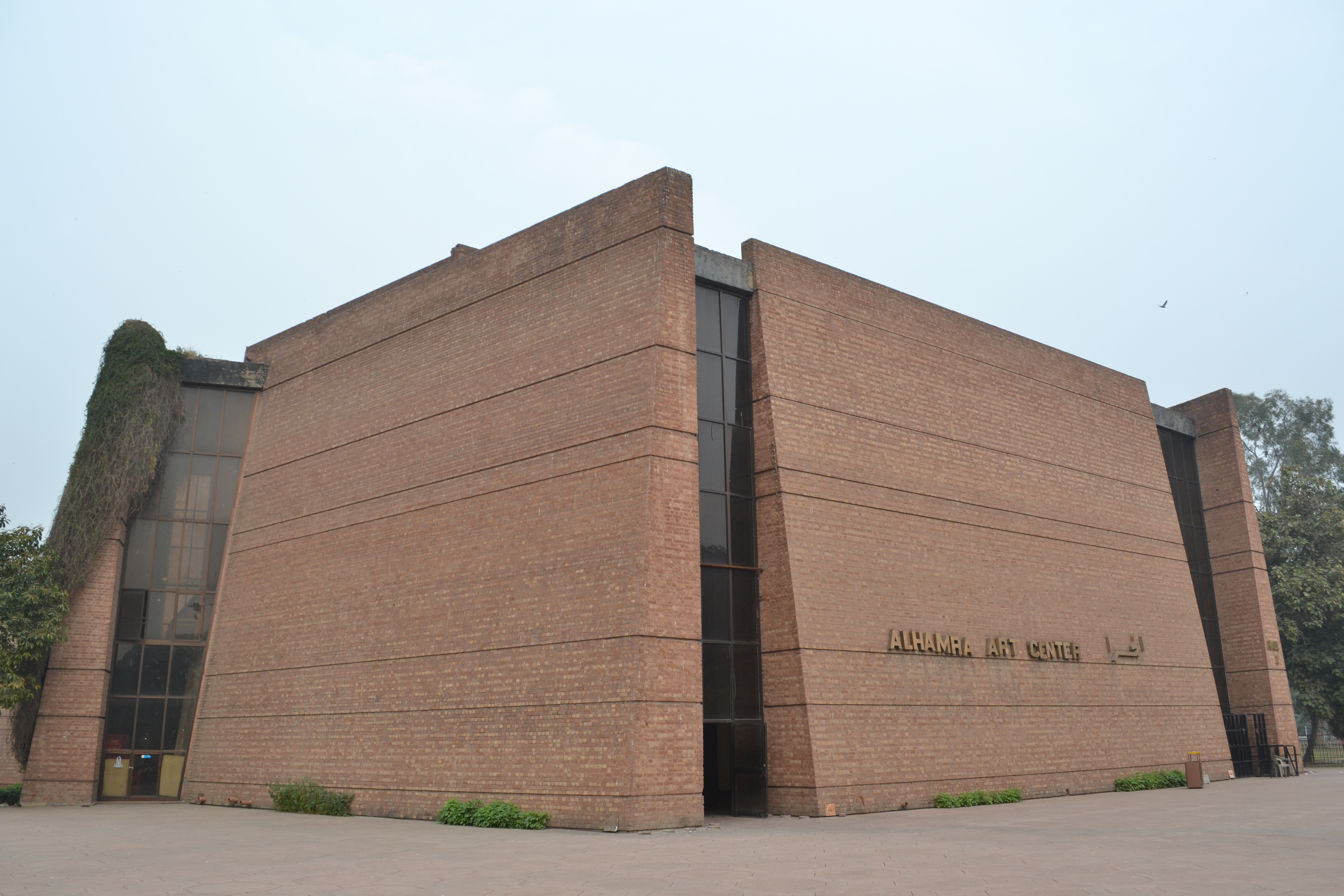
Alhamra Arts Council where Nilaam Ghar was organized

Occasionally, it was also organised in other cities like Karachi.

== See also ==
- Inaam Ghar
- Inaam Ghar Plus
- Jeet Ka Dum
- Jeeto Pakistan
