= Karim Shahabuddin =

Pakistani musician

Karim Shahabuddin کریم شہاب الدین

Background information
- Born: Mumbai, British India
- Origin: Pakistan
- Died: United States
- Genres: Film score
- Occupations: Music director
- Years active: 1964 – 1978

Karim Shahabuddin was a Pakistani music director who scored music in Bengali and Urdu films in the late 1960s and early 1970s. He is known for composing the song, "Dekha Na Tha Kabhi Hum Ne Ye Samaan" (vocalized by Alamgir and Nahid Akhtar) for the 1978 film, Bobby and Julie.

== Early life ==
Shahabuddin was born into a business family in Mumbai, India. His family migrated to Dhaka, East Pakistan in the 1960s. Shahabuddin married Malak Karim Shahabuddin. She resided in both Atlanta, GA and Naperville, IL before passing away on March 2nd, 2026. Shahabuddin, an Ismaili, met and performed for Shah Karim Aga Khan IV in his earlier years.

== Career ==
=== Film ===
Shahabuddin started his career as a music director with Bengali movies from Dhaka, East Pakistan. His first Urdu film "Ye Bhi Ek Kahani" was released in 1964. His first breakthrough was the film "Chand Aur Chandini" (1968) and all the songs composed by Shahabuddin for the movie became very popular; "Ay Jahan, Ab Hay Manzil Kahan, Chhut Geya Hamsafar, Kho Geya Karwan (Singer: Ahmad Rushdi), " Jan-e-Tamana, Khat Hay Tumhara, Pyar Bhara Afsana (Singer: Ahmad Rushdi), "Teri Yaad Aa Geyi, Gham Khushi Mein Dhall Gayey" (Singer: Masood Rana), to mention a few. Shahabuddin's last film in East Pakistan was "Payal" (1970).
After the separation of East Pakistan, Shahabuddin came to Lahore and got a chance to compose music for an action Lollywood movie, "Inteqaam Ke Sholay" (1976), but its music went unnoticed. Then in 1978, he signed as a music director the movie "Sharmeeli" for which he composed a very popular song, "Jee Rahay Hein Hum Tanha" (vocalized by A. Nayyar). In the same year, he gave music for a movie, "Bobby and Julie". The film was a flop, but its songs became super hit, especially the song "Dekha Na Tha Kabhi Hum Ne Ye Samaan" (Singers: Alamgir and Naheed Akhtar) became an iconic of the Pakistani music history.
Apart from films, Shahabuddin also did some private albums and composed flight music for the PIA.

=== Television ===
In the later years of 1970s, Shahabuddin joined Pakistan Television's Karachi Center. For many years, he composed background music for Tariq Aziz's popular TV show "Neelam Ghar". He also arranged music for the PTV awards show in 1980.

== Filmography ==
- 1964: Yeh Bhi Ek Kahani (Urdu)
- 1968: Chand Aur Chandni (Urdu)
- 1968: Jungli Phool (Urdu)
- 1968: Gori (Urdu)
- 1969: Bijli (Urdu)
- 1969: Mukti (Bengali)
- 1970: Bablu (Bengali)
- 1970: Payel (Urdu)
- 1970: Nupur (Bengali dubbed)
- 1972: Chhondo Hariye Gelo (Bengali)
- 1976: Inteqam Kay Sholay (Urdu)
- 1978: Sharmili (Urdu)
- 1978: Bobby and Julie (Urdu)
- Unreleased: Aadhi Larki (Urdu)

== Popular compositions ==
Shahabuddin composed 58 songs in 9 films. Some of the more famous songs include:

- 1968 (Film: Chand Aur Chandni): Jan-e-Tamana, Khat Hay Tumhara, Pyar Bhara Afsana ... Singer(s): Ahmad Rushdi, Poet: Suroor Barabankvi
- 1968 (Film: Chand Aur Chandni): Teri Yaad Aa Geyi, Gham Khushi Mein Dhall Geye ... Singer(s): Masood Rana, Poet: Suroor Barabankvi
- 1968 (Film: Chand Aur Chandni): Tujhay Pyar Ki Qasm Hay, Mera Pyar Ban Kay Aa Ja ... Singer(s): Masood Rana/Mala Begum, Poet: Suroor Barabankvi
- 1968 (Film: Chand Aur Chandni): Yeh Samaa, Mouj Ka Karwan, Aaj A Hamsafar, Lay Chala Hay ... Singer(s): Mala Begum/Masood Rana, Poet: Suroor Barabankvi
- 1978 (Film: Bobby and Julie): Dekha Na Tha Kabhi Hum Ne Yeh Samaa ... Singer(s): Alamgir/Naheed Akhtar, Poet: Adeem Hashmi
- 1978 (Film: Bobby and Julie): Baharen, Teray Aanay Say ... Singer: Alamgir, Poet: Adeem Hashmi
- 1978 (Film: Sharmili): Jee Rahay Hayn Ham Tanha Aur Tera Gham Tanha ... Singer(s): A. Nayyar, Poet: Younis Hamdam

== Death ==
In the later years of his life, Shahabuddin had moved to the U.S. along with his family. He died at Grady Hospital in Atlanta, GA.
