= Khan (TV series) =

Pakistani television series

- Genre: Political
- Written by: Syed Atif Ali
- Directed by: Ali Faizan
- Starring: Noman Ijaz; Shaista Lodhi; Atiqa Odho; Saba Hameed; Aijaz Aslam
- Country of origin: Pakistan
- Original language: Urdu
- No. of episodes: 30

Production
- Producer: Babar Javed
- Production location: Pakistan
- Running time: Approx 40 Minutes

Original release
- Network: Geo Entertainment
- Release: 19 February – 20 October 2017

Khan is a 2017 Pakistani serial drama directed by Ali Faizan, produced by Babar Javed, and written by Syed Atif Ali. It stars Nauman Ijaz, Atiqa Odho, and Shaista Lodhi in lead roles and aired every Sunday at 8:00 pm. Later, it moved to Friday at 9:00 pm. It was the second drama to star Lodhi after her first series Waada.

== Plot ==
The titular Khan (Nauman Ijaz) holds great influence in making and demolishing the government. He is a social worker, a caring husband, a doting father, and a caretaker of his sister. Not only this, he still sincerely remembers his ex-lover, but very few people are aware of Khan’s dark personality.

Khan was born and brought up in a village where his parents served a feudal family. Back in the day, he developed feelings for Sarwat, a girl in his neighbourhood who had similar feelings for him. Their love seemed like an unbreakable bond, but fate had something else in store.

The son of a feudal lord kidnapped and raped Sarwat, and killed a person who tried to stop him. To protect his son, the feudal lord pressurised Khan to claim responsibility for the murder and promised him bail. Khan appeared at the police station and confessed to the murder without knowing that he was also accepting the rape of his love interest.

When Sarwat visits Khan at the police station, she asks him about the real culprit he is saving and spits on his face. This act jolts Khan’s ego, and a volcano of revenge erupts in his mind. The emerging circumstances take Khan far away from his lover, and he finds out about his real enemies. A resourceful person in jail frees Khan from police custody and takes an oath from Khan to work for the underworld.

Khan releases from prison with a single mission— gathering unparalleled power and top secrets of government officials and cutting the throats of his opponents. He emerges as a billionaire, a plutocrat, and an underworld don who is a social activist for the world but a game changer from behind. When he finds that his former lover is married to his rival, sweet memories from their past start hurting Khan even more.

== Cast ==
- Nauman Ijaz as Khan
- Aijaz Aslam as Jameel
- Shaista Lodhi as Sarwat
- Atiqa Odho as Shabana
- Nauman Masood as Yaqoob
- Saba Hameed as Rahat
- Yasir Shah as Haroon
- Asad Malik as Zaman
- Yamina Peerzada as Neelam
- Ali Josh as Kamal
- Munawar Saeed
- Fatima Shah as Beena
- Ali Hashmi
- Usman Mazhar as Arshad
- Iman Zaidi as Naila

== Production ==
The drama was produced by Babar Javed and was one of the most expensive dramas in Pakistan's television history.
