= Shahvaar Ali Khan =

Pakistani actor

- Born: Shahvaar Ali Khan; Lahore, Pakistan
- Education: Trinity College
- Occupations: Actor; Singer; Composer
- Years active: 2000 – present
- Children: 2

Shahvaar Ali Khan is a Pakistani writer, singer-songwriter, actor and composer. His first single "No Saazish No Jang" is being touted as the official peace anthem by youth organisations across South Asia and America. In the peace anthem song, Shahvaar has used the voices of Muhammad Ali Jinnah, Imran Khan, Benazir Bhutto, Mahatma Gandhi and Barack Obama. The song has also been especially well received by Pakistani, Indian, Bangladeshi and Nepali students from colleges like Harvard, Trinity, NYU and many other institutions abroad, in addition to assorted listeners in Pakistan and India.

== Early life ==
Shahvaar Ali Khan graduated in Economics & International Studies from Trinity College in Hartford Connecticut after attending Cambridge Rindge & Latin School.

== Career ==
After switching from Investment Banking in New York to the Petroleum Industry in Pakistan his passion for music, entertainment, writing, along with his business oriented skills and creativity landed Shahvaar in Advertising. Shahvaar found the whole ad man lifestyle intriguing in part due to the company of some artistic peers and clients, which helped him understand the pulse of the audience. Concurrently, Shahvaar started focusing on his Music, singing, songwriting/writing since 2008 and did a soft/viral internet availability of his first song "NO SAAZISH, NO JANG – Peace NOT Pieces" (NSNJ) on his website as an experiment.

Even without a Music Video-launching pad or a single advertising dollar spent on promoting NSNJ, Shahvaar found himself sharing a print space with the likes of Shahrukh Khan and Michael Jackson as Front Page news on many Pakistani and Indian Newspapers/Magazines including The News Instep, The Times of India (Delhi/Bombay Times), The Hindu, The Daily Jang, MSN India, Yahoo India, The Asian Age – Delhi, Mumbai, Kolkata, London, Deccan Chronicle, India, News Today, India, The Daily Siasat, India, USA Today, Hum Shehri (Urdu), Pakistan, India News (Hindi), Bombay Mid Day, Daily Pakistan (Urdu), etc. including a few Bollywood websites. However, despite the response, contrary to his expectations the struggle for Shahvaar had just begun. It took him close to two years to find the right concept and Director for his Music Video. In the meantime Shahvaar started writing for publications and opened his own Advertising Creative shop.

== Personal life ==
Shahvaar is married and has two children.

== Filmography ==
=== Television series ===
Year	Title	Role	Network
2015	Mera Dard Na Janay Koi	Harris	Hum TV
2016	Noor-e-Zindagi	Faisal	Geo Entertainment
2017	Tishnagi Dil Ki	Omer	Geo TV
2023	Daurr	Rehan	Green Entertainment
2023	Rah-e-Junoon	Kashan	Hum TV
