= Shermeen Ali =

Pakistani actress

Sharmeen Ali
- Born: Shermeen Kashif Ali; 24 May 1990 (age 36); Karachi, Pakistan
- Education: University of Karachi
- Occupations: Actress; Model; Host
- Years active: 2015 – present
- Children: 1

Shermeen Ali is a Pakistani actress, model and host. She is known for her roles in dramas Pyar Ke Sadqay, Tum Ho Wajah, Ruswai, Laut Ke Chalay Aana, Sang-e-Mar Mar and Pardes.

== Early life ==
Shermeen was born in 1990 on 24 June in Karachi, Pakistan. She completed her studies from University of Karachi.

== Career ==
She made her debut as an actress in 2015 on Hum TV drama Mera Dard Na Janay Koi as Ramla. She was noted for her roles in dramas Sanam, Zara Yaad Kar, Jalti Barish and Sang-e-Mar Mar. Her performance was praised by critics in Sang-e-Mar Mar, a play critical of the so-called "honour" issues. After that Sharmeen appeared in dramas Laut Ke Chalay Aana, Aadat, Choti Choti Batain and Aatish. Since then she appeared in dramas Qismat, Pyar Ke Sadqay, Tum Ho Wajah and Pardes.

== Personal life ==
Shermeen was married but later they divorced. She has one daughter.

== Filmography ==
=== Television ===
Year	Title	Role	Network
2015	Mera Dard Na Janay Koi	Ramla	Hum TV
2016	Sanam	Sara	Hum TV
2016	Zara Yaad Kar	Geti Deswali	Hum TV
2016	Sang-e-Mar Mar	Palwasha	Hum TV
2016	Saya-e-Dewar Bhi Nahi	Tahira	Hum TV
2016	Dil Banjaara	Meesha	Hum TV
2017	Jalti Barish	Maria	TV One
2017	Laut Ke Chalay Aana	Abeera	Geo TV
2017	Aadat	Minaal	TV One
2018	Mazaaq Raat	Herself	Dunya News
2018	Aatish	Zara	Hum TV
2018	Kis Din Mera Viyah Howay Ga Season 4	Masooma Pyaari	Geo Entertainment
2019	Choti Choti Batain	Samiya	Hum TV
2019	Ruswai	Pinky	ARY Digital
2019	Qismat	Maham	Express Entertainment
2020	Mazaaq Raat	Herself	Dunya News
2020	Pyar Ke Sadqay	Lalarukh	Hum TV
2020	Tum Ho Wajah	Sanna	Hum TV
2021	Star & Style	Herself	PTV Home
2021	Pardes	Nausheen	ARY Digital
2021	Badnaseeb	Asmat	Hum TV
2021	Bisaat	Afsha	Hum TV
2023	Meesni	Tehmina	Hum TV
2023	Tera Waada	Nagin	ARY Digital
2024	Hasrat	Farheen	ARY Digital
2024	Shehzadi House	Hira	Green Entertainment
2024	Meri Tanhai	Tahira	Hum TV
2025	Dastak	Fiza	ARY Digital
2025	Pal Do Pal	Rosheen	ARY Digital
2025	Main Zameen Tu Aasmaan	Amaya Sufiyan	Green Entertainment

=== Telefilm ===
Year	Title	Role
2019	Bakra Impossible	Sohana

=== Film ===
Year	Title	Role
2016	Ek Thi Marium	Marvi Mukhtiar
2025	Begunah	Shazia

== Awards and nominations ==
Year	Award	Category	Result	Title	Ref.
2017	International Pakistan Prestige Awards	Most Stylish TV Presenter Female	Nominated	Herself	
2022	PTV Award	Best Host	Won	Star & Style	
