= Shaista Lodhi =

Pakistani doctor, actress and television host

Shaista Lodhi شائستہ لودھی
- Born: 26 November 1976 (age 49); Karachi, Sindh, Pakistan
- Education: MBBS; Jinnah Sindh Medical University
- Occupations: Anchor; TV presenter; actor; Doctor
- Years active: 2001–present
- Organization(s): ARY News (2006-2008); ARY Digital (2008-2010); Geo TV (2010–2014); Hum Sitaray (2015-2016); SEE TV (2016); Geo TV (2017-2018); PTV Home (2021-2022)
- Spouse(s): Waqar Wahidi (m. 1999–2012) Adnan Lodhi (m. 2015)
- Children: 3
- Parent: Ali Gohar Lodhi (father)
- Relatives: Sahir Lodhi (brother)

YouTube information
- Channel: SL Digital
- Years active: 2018–present
- Genre: Entertainment
- Subscribers: 383 thousand
- Views: 73.3 million
- Last updated: 16 September 2025
- Website: drshaistalodhi.com

Shaista Lodhi (Urdu: شائستہ لودھی) is a Pakistani television host, and actress.

== Early life and education ==
Shaista Lodhi was born in Karachi to Ali Gohar Lodhi and Roshan Taj Lodhi. She grew up in a family with three brothers (Amir Lodhi, Tahir Lodhi and Sahir Lodhi). In 2000, she completed her MBBS from Jinnah Sindh Medical University.

== Television career ==
Shaista started her career as a VJ in 2001. She was then asked to fill in as a host on a private TV channel. She was the host of the morning show Good Morning Pakistan, which aired on ARY Digital. At the end of September 2010, she joined GEO and hosted the morning show Utho Jago Pakistan on the same channel. The show was suspended on 15 May 2014 by the channel administration after alleged blasphemy during the show and she left Pakistan because of fears for her safety.

Shaista then moved to South Africa with her three children and returned to Pakistan in 2015. She made her comeback in morning shows by hosting Sitare Ki Subah on Hum Sitaray. She also hosted Mehmaan Nawaz on SEE TV and then returned to Geo TV, hosting Geo Subah Pakistan from 30 January 2017.

In 2020, Shaista Lodhi was a captain of the Peshawar Stallions team in Jeeto Pakistan League in Ramadan Special.

In October 2021, she revealed that she would be hosting a morning show on PTV Home in the near future, replacing Nadia Khan. She made her debut on the show, Morning at Home, on 15 November 2021.

== Personal life ==
In 1999, Shaista married Waqar Wahidi, after which she came to be known as Shaista Wahidi. They got separated in 2012 and the marriage eventually ended in a divorce. She has three children from her first marriage.

She married for a second time in June 2015. Her second husband, Adnan Lodhi, is the first Pakistani art auctioneer in South Africa. Shaista's brother, Sahir Lodhi, also works in the TV industry.

== Filmography ==
=== Television series ===
Year	Title	Role	Channel	Ref.
2016	Waada	Sumaira	ARY Digital	
2017	Khan	Sarwat	Geo Entertainment	
2020	Jeeto Pakistan League	Captain (Peshawar Stallions)	ARY Digital	
2021	Pardes	Zubaida	ARY Digital	
2023	Samjhota	Nargis	ARY Digital	
2024	Fanaa	Samina	Green Entertainment	

=== Telefilm ===
Year	Title	Role	Channel	Ref.
2021	Uff Yeh Biwiyaan	Zoya	ARY Digital	

=== Reality shows ===
Year	Title	Role	Notes
2009	Nestlé Nesvita Women of Strength '09	Guest	Geo TV
2011	Utho Jago Pakistan	Host	Geo TV
2012	Bakhabar Savera	Host	ARY News
2015	Sitaray ki Subha	Host	Hum Sitaray
2016	Mehmaan Nawaz	Guest	SEE TV
2018	Geo Subah Pakistan	Host	Geo TV
2019	With Samina Peerzada	Guest	YouTube
2020	To Be Honest 2.0	Guest	Nashpati Prime
2021	Good Morning Pakistan	Guest	ARY Digital
2021	Morning at Home	Host	PTV
