= Sana Javed =

Pakistani actress (born 1993)

- ثناء جاوید
- Born: 25 March 1993 (age 33); Jeddah, Saudi Arabia
- Education: University of Karachi
- Occupation: Actress
- Years active: 2012–present
- Spouses: Umair Jaswal (m. 2020; div. 2023) Shoaib Malik (m. 2024)
- Relatives: Hina Javed (sister)

Sana Javed (Urdu: ثناء جاوید, born 25 March 1993) is a Pakistani actress who appears on Urdu television. She made her debut in 2012 with Shehr-e-Zaat and later on appeared in several serials. She received recognition after portraying the titular role in the romantic drama Khaani for which she received a nomination at the Lux Style Awards. Javed gained praise for her social-based dramas Ruswai and Dunk and the former earned her the PISA Award for Best Actress Critics.

== Career ==
Sana Javed started her career as a young model and appeared in television commercials. She started acting with a supporting role in the 2012 ARY Digital series Mera Pehla Pyar and made a small appearance in Shehr-e-Zaat in the same year.

In 2016 Javed rose to prominence with the role of an antagonist in the Hum TV's romantic drama Zara Yaad Kar opposite Zahid Ahmed and Yumna Zaidi.

In 2017, Javed made her film debut with the socio-comedy film Mehrunisa V Lub U opposite Danish Taimoor. That same year, she was signed for the lead role in Rangreza, alongside Bilal Ashraf, but later withdrew from the project. Subsequently, she garnered wide recognition and public appreciation for portraying a leading role as Khaani in the romantic drama Khaani. She garnered critical acclaim for her portrayal of Sameera a rape survivor in Ruswai and Pakistan International Screen Award for Best Television Actress Critics.

In 2020, Javed was appointed the captain of the team Islamabad Dragons in the Jeeto Pakistan League, a Ramadan special reality show. Later that year, she starred in Dunk as a university student who falsely accuses her professor of sexual harassment. The series received negative reviews for its subject and portrayal, but her performance was praised.

== Personal life ==
Sana Javed was born on 25 March 1993 in Jeddah, Saudi Arabia to Pakistani parents. She paternally hails from Hyderabad Deccan with also some Kashmiri origin.

After completing school and college at the Pakistan International School in Jeddah, she moved to Lahore with her family and later graduated from the University of Karachi.

In October 2020, Sana married singer Umair Jaswal in a private Nikah ceremony in Karachi. News reports suggested that the couple separated in 2023, with some sources indicating that they had divorced by November 2023. In January 2024, Sana married former Pakistani cricketer Shoaib Malik. The couple had allegedly been in a relationship for nearly three years prior to their marriage while Sana was married to Jaswal. Shoaib's previous marriage to Sania Mirza ended following the revelation of his relationship with Sana. The details of Shoaib and Sana's marriage were publicly confirmed when both shared their wedding images on social media on 20 January 2024.

In 2022, Sana was accused of unprofessional behavior by models and makeup artists, including verbal abuse and mistreatment on set. She did not publicly respond to the allegations.

== Filmography ==
=== Telefilms ===
Year	Title	Role	Notes	Ref(s).
2013	Behadd	Laiba		
2015	Shareek-e-Hayat	Sana	Episode: "Rishton Ki Buniyaad"	
2018	Dino Ki Dulhaniya	Noor Malik		
2023	I Love You Zara	Zara Saeed	Eid Special Telefilm	

=== Television ===
Year	Title	Role	Network	Notes	Ref(s).
2012	Shehr-e-Zaat	Maryam			
2012	Mera Pehla Pyar	Zaara			
2013	Pyarey Afzal	Lubna			
2013	Ranjish Hi Sahi	Tooba			
2013	Meenu Ka Susral	Meenu			
2013	Meri Dulari	Gul Pari			
2013	Hisar E Ishq	Tuba			
2014	Goya	Mohini			
2014	Chingari	Sania			
2015	Dil Ka Kia Rung Karun	Aiza			
2015	Koi Deepak Ho	Sana Iqbal			
2015	Paiwind	Samia			
2015	Maana Ka Gharana	Maana			
2015	Aitraaz	Komal			
2016	Zara Yaad Kar	Mahnoor			
2016	Intezaar	Zoya			
2017	Khaani	Sanam Khan "Khaani"			
2018	Romeo Weds Heer	Heer Luqman			
2019	Darr Khuda Say	Afreen			
2019	Ruswai	Dr. Sameera			
2020	Dunk	Amal Faraz			
2021-22	Aye Musht-E-Khaak	Dua Mustajab			
2022	Kaala Doriya	Mahnoor	Hum TV		
2023	Sukoon	Aina	ARY Digital		
2026	Bas Tera Saath Ho	Ansa	ARY Digital		

=== Other appearances ===
Year	Title	Role	Notes	Ref(s).
2020	Jeeto Pakistan League (season 1)	Herself	Team: "Islamabad Dragons"	
2021	Jeeto Pakistan League (season 2)	Herself	Team: "Islamabad Dragons"	
2022	Jeeto Pakistan League (season 3)	Herself	Team: "Islamabad Dragons"	
2023	Jeeto Pakistan League (season 4)	Herself	Team: "Islamabad Dragons"	

=== Music videos ===
Year	Song	Singer(s)	Notes	Ref(s).
2015	"Khair Mangda"	Atif Aslam		
2017	"Qubool Hai"	Various	For Nomi Ansari's wedding wardrobe	
2017	"Tere Bina"	Hina Nasrullah		
2018	"Humein Pyaar Hai Pakistan Se"	Atif Aslam		

== Awards and nominations ==
Year	Award	Category	Work	Result
2019	Lux Style Awards	Best Actress-Popular	Khaani	Nominated
2019	Lux Style Awards	Best Actress-Critics	Khaani	Nominated
2020	PISA Awards	Best Actress-Critics	Ruswai	Won
2021	People's Choice Awards	Best Actress-In A Nand Role	Ruswai	Won
