= Hisar E Ishq =

- Genre: Drama
- Written by: Salma Younus
- Directed by: Furqaan Khan
- Starring: Sana Javed
- Opening theme: Kay Sa Hisar-e-ishq, hai kaisi hai zindagi
- Country of origin: Pakistan
- Original language: Urdu
- No. of episodes: 111

Production
- Production location: Karachi

Original release
- Network: Urdu 1
- Release: 13 December 2012

Hisar E Ishq is a 2012 Pakistani television series aired on Urdu 1. It was written by Salma Younus and directed by Furqaan Khan.

Set against a feudal backdrop, the narrative follows Hakim Ali and his two sons. One is Jhanzaib, who is ambitious and ruthless, he uses his wealth and power to get what he wants — often at others’ expense. Aalam is kind-hearted and principled, unlike his brother. He falls in love with Rania, a middle-class woman, and courageously stands by his love despite numerous obstacles. The drama explores the fallout of Jhanzaib’s manipulations for many families. As the next generation steps in, Jhanzaib is eventually forced to confront his wrongdoings and seek redemption.

== Cast ==
- Kiran Haq as Rania
- Humayun Ashraf
- Sana Javed
- Imran Ashraf
- Hajra Khan
- Sohail Asghar
- Rubina Ashraf
- Anoushey Abbasi
- Zaheen Tahira
- Asad Malik
- Mariya Khan
- Farah Nadir
