= Tariq Aziz (TV personality) =

Pakistani television host, poet and film actor (1936–2020)

- طارق عزیز
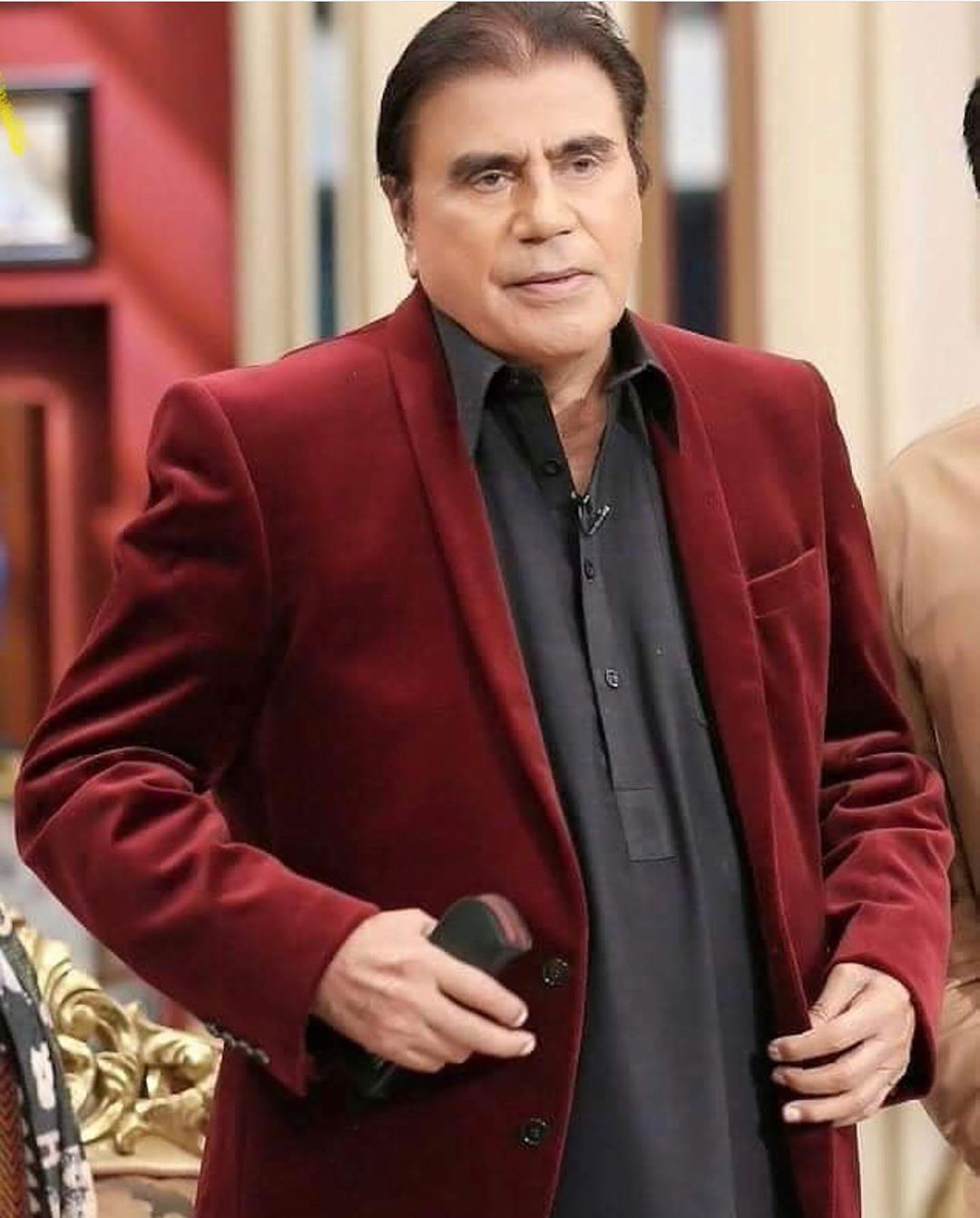
- Tariq Aziz in 2018
- Born: 28 April 1936; Jalandhar, Punjab, British India
- Died: 17 June 2020 (aged 84); Lahore, Punjab, Pakistan
- Occupations: Television Presenter; Film Actor
- Years active: 1961 – 2020
- Known for: Nilaam Ghar, Tariq Aziz Show, Bazm-e-Tariq Aziz
- Office: Member of National Assembly of Pakistan (1997–1999)
- Spouse: Hajira Tariq Aziz
- Awards: Pride of Performance (1992)

Tariq Aziz (Punjabi, Urdu: طارق عزیز; 28 April 1936 – 17 June 2020) was a Pakistani television host, poet, film actor, and politician known for PTV's quiz show Nilaam Ghar, first aired in 1974, later renamed the Tariq Aziz Show and later still as Bazm-e-Tariq Aziz. He was known for his iconic line "Dekhti Aankho, Sunte Kaano aapko Tariq Aziz ka Salam pohnchay" (Urdu: دیکھتی آنکھوں، سنتے کانوں آپ کو طارق عزیز کا سلام پہنچے) and his passionate, peculiar style of uttering the patriotic slogan Pakistan Zindabad (Urdu: پاکستان زندہ باد).

He was the first face to appear on television in Pakistan. He had also been a member of the National Assembly of Pakistan between 1997 and 1999.

== Early life and education ==
Tariq Aziz was born in 1936 in Jalandhar, Punjab Province. His father Mian Abdul Aziz was a lawyer, journalist and editor, responsible of a fortnightly magazine from Sahiwal, while being politically attached to the Majlis-e Ahrar-e Islam. Later, Mian Abdul Aziz renamed himself Mian Abdul Aziz "Pakistani" when Choudhry Rahmat Ali coined the term "Pakistan", and he would eventually lose his government job because of his anti-colonial activities.

Tariq Aziz received his early education in Jalandhar and in 1947 migrated to the then Montgomery District city (now Sahiwal, Pakistan). He graduated from the Government College Sahiwal. Later they shifted to Abbottabad and where his father died and was buried.

== Career ==
=== Radio ===
Aziz moved to Lahore to start his career at Radio Pakistan in 1961.

=== Television ===
When Pakistan Television (PTV) started its initial broadcast in November 1964 from Lahore. Aziz was the first person to be seen on it and went on to become first male PTV announcer. He was one of the first TV hosts to gain commercial success by using the platform of his quiz show Nilaam Ghar/Tariq Aziz Show/Bazm E Tariq Aziz. He interviewed many notable intellectuals, sports persons and celebrities on his shows. Aziz appeared on several local television programs and morning shows. He also organised telethons for charity purposes.

After being active in politics in the 1990s and early 2000s, he returned to the entertainment industry. But this time his career in the entertainment industry could not reach the highs of the 1960s, 1970s, and 1980s due to plenty of competition by newly launched private TV channels in Pakistan after 2002.

He appeared, as a guest, and answered all the questions on the game show Inaam Ghar in Pakistan, becoming the first man to do this. He did this without using any help provided to the participants. He then donated all the prizes that he received to an organisation which works for the welfare of people.

=== Film ===
Tariq Aziz, along with the film actor Waheed Murad and film actress Zeba, starred in Pakistani film Insaniyat (1967). Aziz also starred in other Pakistani films Haar Gaya Insaan and then later in Qasam us Waqt Ki (1969). He also acted in a number of Pakistani films in the late 1960s and 1970s in side-roles. One of his movies was Salgira (1969) which was a highly successful musical movie and won two Nigar Awards for that year.

=== Politics ===
Aziz was active in student politics during his college era and joined Zulfiqar Ali Bhutto's Pakistan Peoples Party in 1970. At that time, Aziz was called a "firebrand socialist" known for charging up the crowds with revolutionary slogans at Bhutto's rallies. However, later he parted ways with that party and went back to showbiz. In 1996, Aziz joined Pakistan Muslim League (N) and was elected as a member of Pakistan National Assembly from Lahore. He was one of the political activists who were charged with attacking the Supreme Court of Pakistan building in 1997.

During Pervez Musharraf's presidency, he joined his political party Pakistan Muslim League (Q). However, he could not attain any status of note in that party and was sidelined.

== Philanthropy ==
Aziz was a philanthropist, book-lover, and poetry reciter. In 2018, a major English-language Pakistani newspaper reported about him, "He (Tariq Aziz) shared that having children or no children is the will of Allah and since he has no kids of his own, he would like to give all his earnings for the welfare of his country. Aziz has won the hearts of many by announcing his will and he surely is a role model for all of us."

== Literary works ==
Tariq Aziz was a poet of Punjabi language and writer. His books include:

- Hamzad Da Dukh (Punjabi: ہمزاد دا دکھ), Pain of Alter Ego, poetry in Punjabi language
- Iqbal Shanasi (Urdu: اقبال شناسی), Knowing Iqbal
- Hazar Dastaan (Urdu: ہزار داستان): His collection of Urdu newspaper columns.
- Footpath sy Parliament tak (Urdu: فٹ پاتھ سے پارلیمنٹ تک), From Footpath to Parliament: Book

== Death ==
He died on 17 June 2020 in Lahore, aged 84. He was admitted to a private hospital on the night of 16 June 2020 after feeling ill. He was laid to rest at the Garden Block, Garden Town graveyard in Lahore, Pakistan beside his mother's grave.

== Awards and recognition ==
- Pride of Performance Award by the President of Pakistan in 1992 for his services to the nation.
- At 9th PTV Awards he won Best Host Award in 1998
