= Mera Dard Na Janay Koi =

- Genre: Soap; Romantic comedy
- Written by: Saima Akram Chaudhary
- Directed by: Saima Waseem
- Starring: Sabreen Hisbani; Wahaj Ali; Faria Sheikh; Erum Azam; Saman Ansari; Shermeen Ali; Aleezay Tahir
- Opening theme: "Mera Dard Na Janay Koi"
- Country of origin: Pakistan
- Original language: Urdu
- No. of episodes: 74

Production
- Producer: Momina Duraid
- Production location: Karachi, Sindh
- Editor: Saad Bin Jawed
- Camera setup: Multi-Camera
- Production company: MD Productions

Original release
- Network: Hum TV
- Release: 14 October 2015 – 18 February 2016

Mera Dard Na Janay Koi (Urdu: مرادرد نہ جانے کوئ, lit. 'No one knows my pain') is a Pakistani romantic soap that premiered on 14 October 2015 on Hum TV, airing Monday to Thursday. It is directed by Saima Waseem, written by Saima Akram Chaudhry and produced by Momina Duraid.

== Plot ==
The series explores the story of three families. Bilal has three sisters and is in love with Maira, his cousin. Maira's dad also wants Bilal to be his son-in-law because Bilal is the son of his sister. Bilal's eldest sister returns to her maika and says that her husband and his family abuses her because she cannot have a baby, so she left her susral. Her mother got angry that Shiza her younger sister is unmarried and now you have come. While Haris is in love with Shiza. But his step-mother and step sister, Ramla do not want him to marry Shiza. Ramla is jealous of her. Maira and Bilal marry each other but family issues arise. They do not accept Maira, since she cannot produce a child. She is abused and finally their house. Aapa and Amma find a girl, Zartashia and marry her with Bilal. Soon they get fed up of her because she is badtameez and she also could not produce a child. Again, they want Bilal to divorce his current wife. Shiza and Haris also marry. Ramla stole their diamond ring and put it on. She also told her Aani about it. One day, when the whole family was at the dinner table, Haris sees the ring on Ramla's finger. She and Aani said that it is not Shiza's. Aani bought it for Ramla. Haris said that the design was the same. But they refused. Then he and Shiza go on a vacation out of the country. At home Ramla and Aani were responsible for their children. Ramla plays a trick and kills Shiza's daughter. Heartbroken Haris and Shiza, when told about the death of their daughter return to Pakistan. Zartashia finds the medical report of Bilal and comes to know that problem was in Bilal, that she and Maira, could not produce. Bilal finds out that Zartashia is having affair. He yells at Zartashia and tells her that he knows the truth. So Zartashia also says that Bilal was the one with the problem and cannot have children. Aapa and Ammi find out and stare at each other. Ammi and Bilal married Aapa off. But she is again divorced because he knew that Aapa's youngest sister is flirting with someone. Amma cries that she is so unlucky that one daughter cannot marry, son cannot have children, other daughter's beti died and youngest is having an affair. Amma then goes to her brother's house and asks Maira’s hand in marriage. Maira and Bilal get married again and live happily ever after.

== Cast ==
- Sabreen Hisbani as Hina
- Wahaj Ali as Bilal
- Shahvaar Ali Khan as Harris
- Aleezay Tahir as Shiza
- Shermeen Ali as Ramla
- Shaista Jabeen as Hina bilal hira and shiza's mother
- Sara Razi as Hira
- Erum Azam as Saima
- Sajida Syed as Aliya Begum
- Saman Ansari as Sarwat Randhawa
- Mehmood Akhtar as Randhawa
