= Jeeto Pakistan League =

Pakistani televisions series

- Genre: Sports
- Directed by: Asif Khan; Khurram Farid
- Presented by: Fahad Mustafa
- Country of origin: Pakistan
- Original language: Urdu
- No. of seasons: 7
- No. of episodes: 203 (list of episodes)

Production
- Producers: Salman Iqbal; Jeerjes Seja
- Editor: ARY Digital
- Camera setup: Multiple-camera setup
- Running time: 120 minutes approx

Original release
- Network: ARY Digital
- Release: 2020

Jeeto Pakistan League (JPL) is a Pakistani Ramadan reality television game show where celebrities are seen competing with each other in an indoor game format. It is a special "league"-based edition of the game show, Jeeto Pakistan. Presented by Fahad Mustafa, it started airing from Ramadan 2020 on ARY Digital.

== Format ==
A "league"-based format where teams representing seven major cities Karachi, Lahore, Islamabad, Multan, Quetta, Peshawar and Gujranwala would compete against each other, with each team led by a notable celebrity. Each episode also features guest celebrities supporting there favourite teams and new contestants would be drawn for each episode while maintaining social distancing due to COVID-19, and the top two teams with most points would qualify for a final play-off. Members of the public would be able to participate in the show through live calls.

== Teams ==
The show consists of seven teams competing for grand prize.

Season	Episodes	Year	Islamabad Dragons	Karachi Lions	Lahore Falcons	Multan Tigers	Peshawar Stallions	Quetta Knights	Gujranwala Bulls	Winner
1	29	2020	Sana Javed	Humayun Saeed	Adnan Siddiqui	—N/a	Shaista Lodhi	Sarfaraz Ahmed	—N/a	Quetta Knights
2	29	2021	Sana Javed	Humayun Saeed	Adnan Siddiqui	Shoaib Malik	Shaista Lodhi	Aijaz Aslam	—N/a	Lahore Falcons
3	29	2022	Sana Javed	Ushna Shah	Adnan Siddiqui	Shoaib Malik	Shaista Lodhi	Sarfaraz Ahmed	Aijaz Aslam	Quetta Knights
4	29	2023	Sana Javed	Ushna Shah	Adnan Siddiqui	Shoaib Malik	Shaista Lodhi	Sarfaraz Ahmed	Aijaz Aslam	Multan Tigers and Peshawar Stallions
5	29	2024	Kubra Khan	Ushna Shah	Adnan Siddiqui	Shoaib Malik	Shaista Lodhi	Sarfaraz Ahmed	Aijaz Aslam	Quetta Knights
6	29	2025	Kubra Khan	Sana Javed	Adnan Siddiqui	Shoaib Malik	Shaista Lodhi	Sarfaraz Ahmed	Aijaz Aslam	Quetta Knights

== Seasons ==
- Season 1 (25 April 2020 – 23 May 2020)
- Season 2 (14 April 2021 – 12 May 2021)
- Season 3 (3 April 2022 – 2 May 2022)
- Season 4 (23 March 2023 – 21 April 2023)
- Season 5 (12 March 2024 - 9 April 2024)
- Season 6 (2 March 2025 - 30 March 2025)
- Season 7 (19 February 2026 - 20 March 2026)

== Production ==
In the Ramadan season of 2020, the show's format was changed in light of the coronavirus pandemic and the studio audience was eliminated. Instead, a "league"-based format was introduced where teams representing five major cities would compete against each other, with each team led by a notable celebrity. New contestants would be drawn for each episode while maintaining social distancing, and the top two teams with most points would qualify for a final play-off. Members of the public would be able to participate in the show through live calls.

In 2021, 6th team was announced as Multan Tigers for the city Multan. Shoaib Malik was selected as a captain of Multan Tigers team. Aijaz Aslam was replaced by Sarfraz Ahmed as the captain of Quetta Knights team as Sarfraz Ahmed was busy in Pakistan vs South Africa ODI series.

== Controversy ==
In 2020, Few days after the show started on-air, the video of Siddiqui goes viral where he was seen misbehaving with rival team captain Sarfaraz Ahmed. Many people and celebrities criticized Siddiqui and called the act disrespectful. In the later episode, Siddiqui apologises to Ahmed and his fans saying he didn't mean it. Following his apology both Ahmed and Mustafa told him it's all good and no apologies were required to begin with.

== See also ==
- Ramadan in Pakistan
