= Sanam (TV series) =

Pakistani television series

- promotional poster
- Genre: Romance; Mental Health
- Created by: Momina Duraid
- Developed by: Hum Network; MD Productions; Sultana Siddiqui
- Written by: Mona Haseeb
- Screenplay by: Iqbal Ansari
- Directed by: Haseeb Hassan
- Starring: Osman Khalid Butt; Hareem Farooq; Maya Ali
- Country of origin: Pakistan
- Original language: Urdu
- No. of episodes: 22

Production
- Producer: Momina Duraid
- Production locations: Naya Nazimabad, Karachi, Sindh, Pakistan
- Cinematography: Zeb Rao
- Editors: Jameel Awan; Mahmood Ali; Mohsin
- Camera setup: Multi-camera
- Running time: 35–40 minutes
- Production company: MD Productions

Original release
- Network: Hum TV
- Release: 12 September 2016 – 6 February 2017

Related
- Mann Mayal; Yeh Raha Dil

Sanam (Urdu: صنم; lit: Beloved) is a 2016 Pakistani television series that premiered on Hum TV on 12 September 2016. It is written by Mona Haseeb, directed by Haseeb Hassan and produced by Momina Duraid. The story, told in a heavily serialized manner, follows a love triangle and focuses on mental disorder. It revolves around the journey of Harib, a successful businessman, as he discovers the difference between a life partner and a soulmate. The show first aired on Hum TV, as a part of night programming under Duraid's production company.

Sanam has an ensemble cast with Osman Khalid Butt as Harib, Maya Ali as Aan, and Hareem Farooq as Ayla in leading roles, with the supporting cast Hina Khawaja Bayat, Gul-e-Rana, Abid Ali, Asad Ali, Shermeen Ali and Akbar Islam. The show is set in Karachi, Sindh.

Sanam was the first series to highlight mental health issues in 2016.

The series received generally positive reviews in its premier, however throughout its broadcast, it received mixed to negative reviews where viewers and critics declaring it a drag.

== Premise ==
Sanam is a story of love, friendship, jealousy and relationships. It depicts Harib's (Osman Khalid Butt) journey where he found out the difference between a life partner and a soulmate after he went through relationships with Sara (Shermeen Ali), Ayla (Hareem Farooq) and Aan (Maya Ali). Simultaneously it highlights Ayla's bipolar disorder which is later discovered by Harib.

Harib lost his parents at a very young age and struggled to become a rich businessman. He marries his colleague and girlfriend Ayla (Hareem Farooq) and later reveals to her his former relationship with Sara (Shermeen Ali) who had left him long ago due to his low financial status. Simultaneously, Aan (Maya Ali) is a hardworking independent woman who moves next to Harib's house with her mother Shabnam (Hina Khawaja Bayat) after her father's death. In Shabnam's in-laws, Shama Qureshi (Gul-e-Rana) her sister-in-law wants Aan to marry her son Khurram. From the day of her wedding, Ayla reacts to things in a way that gradually reveals to Harib her bipolar disorder, which she has been suffering from after her mother's second marriage and her parents' abusive relationship. She assumes Aan is Sara and that Harib and Aan are in a relationship. She finally takes a divorce from Harib after a long fight and moves to her parents' home.

After his divorce, a broken Harib is consoled by Aan and her mother who treats him as her son. With time, Aan and Harib become best friends. Sara (Harib's ex-girlfriend) moves in Harib's housing society. After meeting him, she realizes that Harib is now a successful person. She tells him about her separation from her husband Faisal. Aan bonds with Sara's stubborn daughter Fatima (Mariyam Khalif). Sara begins to develop feelings for Harib again, looking to Harib and Aan's strong bonding, Sara's jealousy increases and she decides to separate them. She brings a proposal of her cousin Farhan (Asad Siddiqui) for Aan, which Shabnam accepts. Aan and Farhan get engaged which makes Harib devastated and he confesses his feelings to Aan.

Ayla (who has also moved in the same housing society) snaps a picture of Aan and Harib together and gets it photoshopped into an obscene photograph that gets circulated around social media. As a result, Aan loses her job at the bank. She confronts Harib who files a lawsuit against the bank. However, when Shabnam finds out about Aan's job, she suffers from a heart attack. While she's hospitalized, Farhan and his mother see Harib consoling Aan and tell her off about it. Harib and Shehroze overhear Farhan talking about his past of him being a divorcee and father of two kids. His mother is interested in Aan only because she thinks Aan is a rich heiress. Harib and Shehroze realize that this was Sara's doing. After seeing firsthand the stark difference between Farhan and Harib in the way they help her out in her tough time, Aan also begins to develop feelings for Harib. Eventually both Aan and Harib confess that they love each other but because of Shabnam's frail health, they remain quiet. Farhan finds out the truth about Aan's humble background and her feelings for Harib and secretly escapes to Dubai with his mother. After facing public humiliation of Farhan's reality, Shabnam suffers from a heart attack again and dies. At her funeral, Aan loses her consciousness and her phuppo (Shama) takes her away. Aan's Taya takes charge and tells everyone Aan will only marry whoever she wants. Ayla is institutionalized for rehabilitation in a psychiatric hospital. Ayla ran away from the hospital and reach Harib to tell that she can't do these things alone, she told him that she was prescribed antipsychotics, antidepressants and lithium (a mood stablizer) and doctors has diagnosed that she will never be cured permanently. Ayla was crying and feeling guilt because of her doings against Aan and Harib and she apologizes of what she has done, her depressive episode made her suicidal and she took decision to take her life. Harib apologizes to her for not doing enough to save their marriage and not realizing that she needed proper treatment and tell her that he's always here for Ayla. He visits her weekly and monitors her progress. After 6 months Aan returns to her own house, Harib and Aan get married and she gets her job back at the bank. After some time, Aan also joins Harib in his weekly visits to Ayla. Ayla showed her guilt in front of Aan and told Harib that she can't face Aan after what she has done but Aan truly understand her condition that it wasn't her fault but the effects of bipolar disorder. At the end Aan and Harib start living a happy life together with their family expanding as at the end Aan is revealed to be pregnant where Harib assures her to be by her side throughout everything and even after. And Ayla continued taking her treatment for her bipolar disorder and she was making a good progress.

== Cast ==
- Osman Khalid Butt as Harib : Aan's husband; Ayla's former husband.
- Maya Ali as Aan Harib (nee Qureshi) : Shaukat and Shabnam's daughter; Harib's wife.
- Hareem Farooq as Ayla Salman : Salman and Ayesh's daughter; Harib's former wife.
- Emmad Irfani as Shehroze : Harib's friend.
- Shermeen Ali as Sara : Harib's ex girlfriend; Faisal's ex wife; Fatima's mother.
- Mariyam Khalif as Fatima : Faisal and Sara's daughter.
- Kanwar Nafees as Faisal : Sara's ex husband; Fatima's father.
- Hina Khawaja Bayat as Shabnam Qureshi : Shaukat's wife; Aan's mother.
- Abid Ali as Shaukat Ali Qureshi : Aan's father; Shabnam's husband Shama and Sharafat's brother.
- Asad Siddiqui as Farhan : Sara's cousin; Aan's ex fiancé.
- Sabahat Ali Bukhari as Farhan's mother.
- Munawar Saeed as Sharafat Qureshi : Shaukat and Shama's brother.
- Gul-e-Rana as Shama Qureshi : Shaukat and Sharafat's sister; Khurram's mother; Mehboob's wife.
- Akbar Islam as Mehboob Shama's husband; Khurram's mother.
- Muhammad Asad as Khurram Mehboob : Shama and Mehboob's son.
- Lubna Aslam as Ayesha : Salman's wife; Ayla's mother.
- Sajeer-ud-din Khalifa as Salman : Ayesha's husband; Ayla's father.

== Production ==
=== Development ===
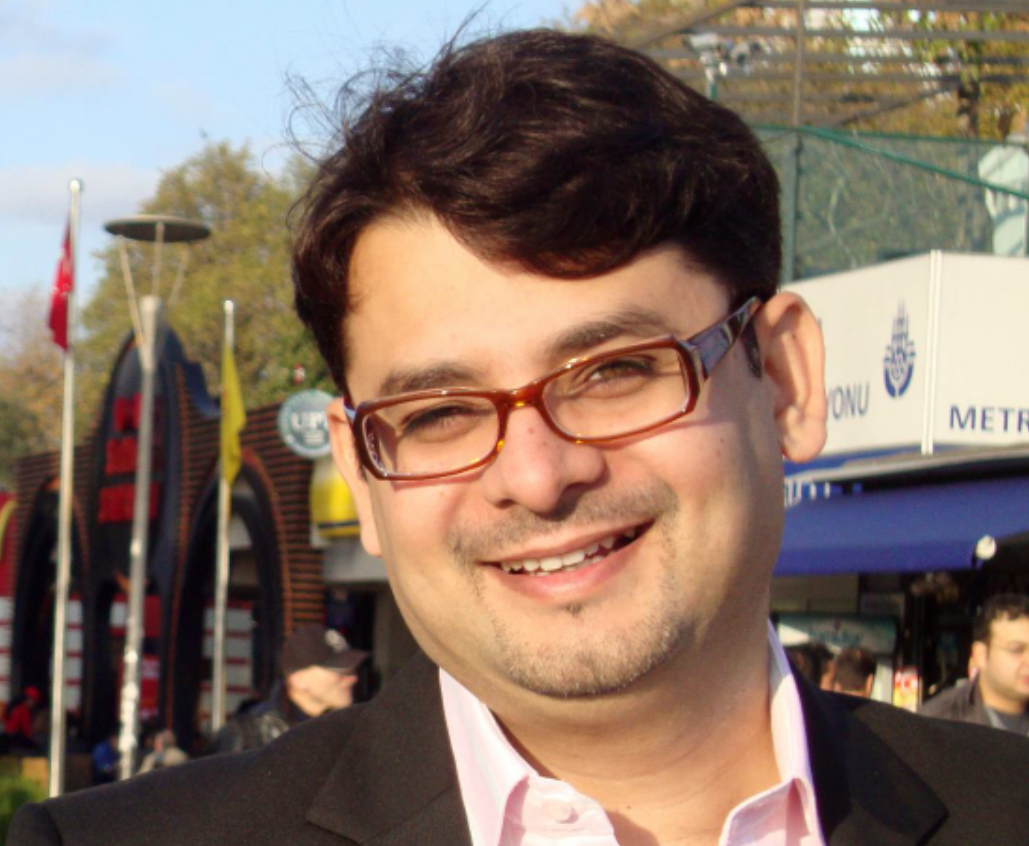
Director of series, Haseeb Hassan

Sanam was developed by Hum TV's senior producer Momina Duraid of MD Productions, with director Haseeb Hassan, who was the director of channel's hit series Mann Mayal and Diyar-e-Dil. Sanam is known to be the first drama to highlight a mental issue in Pakistani entertainment industry. Haseeb returns to direct fourth year in a row since his first project for channel in 2013. Screenplay was done by director's wife Mona Haseeb while script composing is done by Muhammad Wasi-ul-Din who previously scripted Diyar-e-Dil. The show approximately airs weekly episode for 35–40 minutes (minus commercials) every Monday.

=== Casting ===
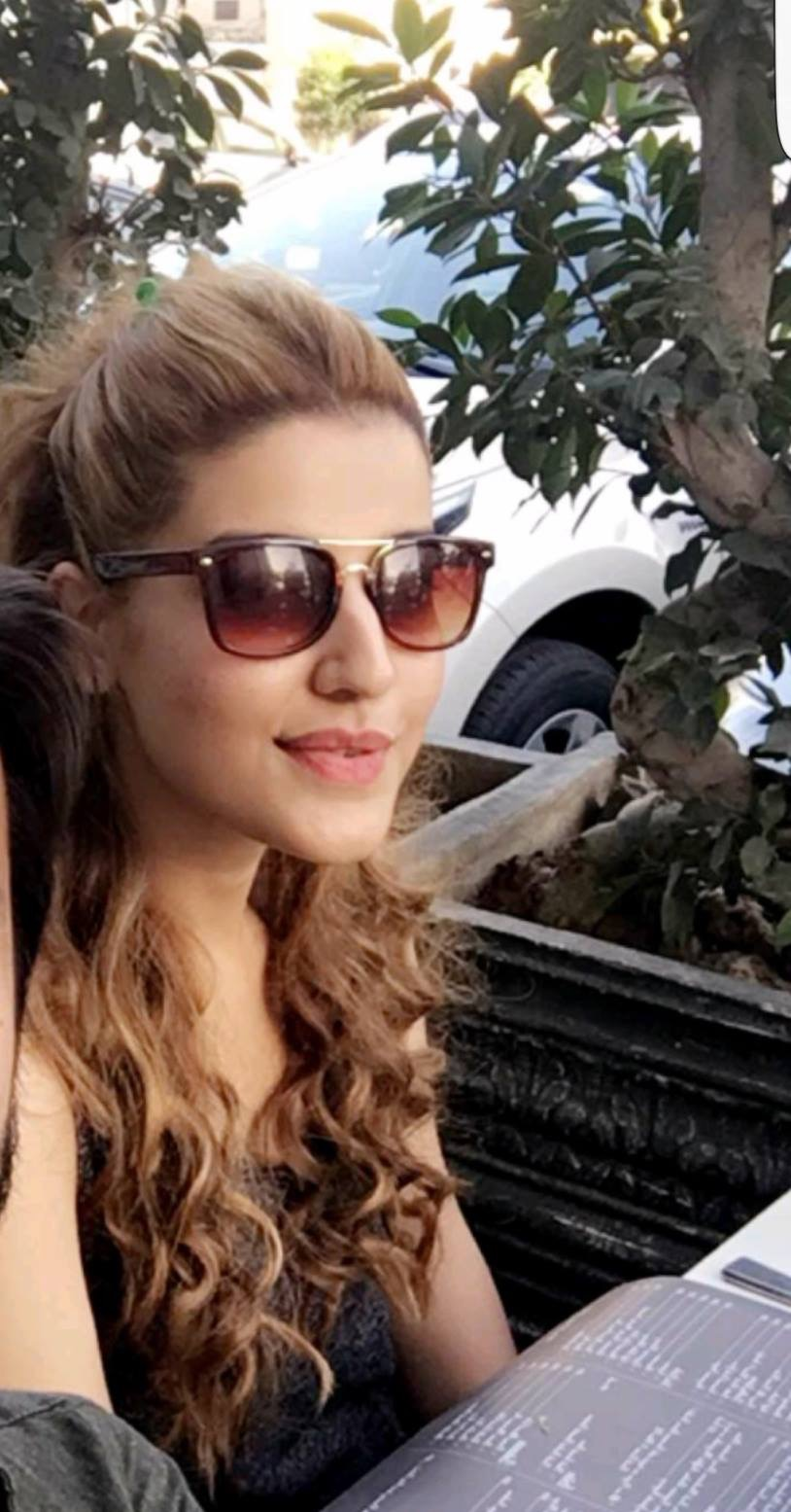
From left to right, Osman Khalid Butt, Maya Ali, Hareem Farooq and played the leading roles respectively.

Creative head Momina Duraid and director Haseeb Hassan mutually choose the cast, which includes Osman Khalid Butt, Maya Ali and Hareem Farooq to play the leading roles of Harib, Aan and Ayla respectively. Osman Khalid Butt and Maya Ali marked their fourth appearance together as a couple having previously acted in Aik Nayee Cinderella, Aunn Zara and Diyar-e-Dil, all of which were commercially and critically successful. Hareem Farooq marked her second appearance with Maya Ali after Diyar-e-Dil.

Sanam was Hareem Farooq's third collaboration project with Osman Khalid Butt after Diyar-e-Dil where the two shared leading roles and Film Janaan where she holds producer credits.

Speaking about her character Farooq said, "My character addresses a very serious mental illness which many people fail to diagnose. In fact, it's a global issue in which one who is suffering and the people around them are unable to figure out what is wrong with them."

Sanam is Mayal Ali's third consecutive collaboration with the director having previously worked in Diyar-e-Dil and Mann Mayal, speaking about her third collaboration, director Haseeb Hassan states It wasn't a deliberate decision; we didn't sign all three of the projects together. I'd honestly call it a coincidence. When we got done with Diyar-e-Dil, we started casting for Sanam, and Maya suited the kind of character the script demanded. During Mann Mayal's casting, we approached several actresses but Maya managed to perfectly fit into Mannu's shoes. Besides that, I'll have to agree with the fact that when you work with people who are genuinely hard working, you try to work with them over and over again.

Emaad Irfani was finalised to portray the role of Shehroze, according to Director's interview with HIP, the creatives first choice was Sheheryar Munawar Sidiqui for this role, since Sidiqui was busy filming his film Project Ghazi, this role was then offered to Irfani who has had three projects airing on Hum TV. Actress Sharmeen Ali was also selected to film in Duraid's two projects Dil Banjaara and Sang-e-Mar Mar was selected to portray the role of Sara. Veteran actresses Hina Khawaja Bayat and Gul-e-Rana were also a part of secondary cast. Bayat's role was finalised after her collaborations with Haissam Hussain in Aik Nayee Cinderella and Aunn Zara, she is selected to portray Shabnam Shaukat, Aan's mother. Actress Lubna Aslam portrayed the role of Ayla's parents whereas veteran actor Munawar Saeed Shabnam's in-law.

=== Filming and Locations ===
Principal photography began in May 2015 after the completion of Diyar-e-Dil. In late June 2015, the project was delayed since creative head Momina Duraid announced the filming of Mann Mayal first, where director Haseeb Hassan chose Maya Ali in leading cast. Furthermore, in January 2016, the project was delayed once again since Osman Khalid Butt and Hareem Farooq were promoting their film Janan. Speaking about Sanam's delay, Haseeb Hassan says: We wanted to give some gap between Diyar-e-Dil and Sanam because it also stars Osman Khalid Butt and Maya Ali in lead roles. So releasing another serial with the same couple and team immediately after the first one wouldn't have created the buzz. But now people are dying to see them both together, so it'll start airing in a couple of months, it's a unique love story, with a totally different package. Filming resumed in August 2016. The series was released before completion. Filming was extensively done in Naya Nazimabad Karachi with Zeb Rao being the cinematographer, Ishtiaq Hussain and Waqar Baloch being the location coordinator, Akbar Baloch being the head of set department and Kashif Ahmed being the head of post production. Graphics were done by Husnain Daswali and Muhammad Furqa Ali Qazi, while editing was done by Jameel Awan, Mahmood Ali and Mohsin.

== Episodes ==
No.	Title	Directed by	Written by	Original release date
1	"Episode 1"	Haseeb Hassan	Mona Haseeb	12 September 2016
Harib is a successful businessman who marries his girlfriend Ayla. Right from the wedding day, Harib notices that Ayla has spells in which she gets irrationally angry and demanding. Shehroze is Harib's best friend and works with him in the same office. Aan is a young working woman who lives with her mother. They have recently moved to Harib's street. Shabnam has only shifted there to avoid her in-laws and to ensure a good proposal for Aan. Aan and Harib exchange greetings as they leave for their offices.
2	"Episode 2"	Haseeb Hassan	Mona Haseeb	19 September 2016
Harib and Ayla attend Harib's friend's dinner where Shehroze tells Ayla about Harib's past relationship with Sara. This makes Ayla furious and she asks Harib about it. After reaching home, Harib tells Ayla about his relationship with Sara and how he struggled to become a successful businessman after she rejected him due to his low financial situation. During the night, Harib finds Ayla hurting herself and realizes she has some mental illness. Aan's in-laws want Khurram to marry her and decide to ask Shabnam. Ayla sees Harib talking to Aan as she was leaving for work and she is overcome with paranoia.
3	"Episode 3"	Haseeb Hassan	Mona Haseeb	26 September 2016
Ayla fights with Harib during her full-blown manic episode. It's her delusion that Aan is Sara and she lives in the same street because of Harib. Harib doesn't understand why she is behaving this way. He visits a doctor who suggests Ayla may be suffering from manic depressive illness or bipolar disorder. It is revealed that Ayla's parents separated when she was six. Her mother remarried and even though she noticed her daughter displaying anger management issues she never sought professional help for her and remained in denial that she would need therapy or counseling. Harib and Ayla eventually make up, but when Aan runs into them on the street and invites them for dinner, Ayla's paranoia sets in. She beats Harib, throws things around, and finally storms into Aan's house and screams at her. The family who was visiting for Aan's proposal leave and Shabnam is shocked.
4	"Episode 4"	Haseeb Hassan	Mona Haseeb	3 October 2016
Shabnam confronts Aan who explains she only met Harib a couple of times while leaving for work. Ayla leaves Harib and goes to stay in Shehroze's house. Harib is shocked and heartbroken. Shabnam and Aan eventually make peace and Shabnam goes to Harib's house to have a few words with Ayla. Harib apologizes sincerely on Ayla's behalf and tells her about his rocky marriage and Ayla's bipolar disorder. Shabnam sympathizes with him and decides to treat Harib as her son. She sends Aan with breakfast for Harib. At that moment, Ayla who had decided to give Harib a second chance, walks into the kitchen and once she sees Aan there, her paranoia takes over.
5	"Episode 5"	Haseeb Hassan	Mona Haseeb	10 October 2016
Ayla leaves Harib's house once again and refuses to listen to him. She then tries to act as if she is getting close to Shehroze to make Harib jealous. Later Shabnam goes with Harib to Shehroze's house to reason with Ayla but she refuses to listen to them. Ayla and Harib argue and she slaps Harib. Harib and Shehroze are unable to realize that Ayla needs help. They keep following whatever Ayla tells them to do. Even when Aan tells Harib that he needs to involve Ayla's parents to resolve this matter, Harib doesn't do so because "Ayla said so". Aan keeps telling Harib he needs to do something concrete to save his marriage but Harib is passive by nature and has more of an attitude of "if she doesn't want to be with me, I won't force her".
6	"Episode 6"	Haseeb Hassan	Mona Haseeb	17 October 2016
Ayla goes to a lawyer and tells him all kinds of lies about Harib – delusions of her mind that she believes to be true. She takes a khula (divorce) from Harib. Harib is shattered when he receives the divorce papers. Shehroze fights with Ayla and leaves his house to live with Harib. Aan blames herself for not doing enough to save Harib's marriage and tells her mother she will try and make things better for Harib.
7	"Episode 7"	Haseeb Hassan	Mona Haseeb	24 October 2016
To take Harib out of his self-pity, Aan takes him to a school of children with special needs. Harib forgets his sorrow while spending time with them. They later go for lunch where they meet Ayla's parents, who are still unaware of their daughter's divorce and are surprised to see Harib with someone else. Sara, Harib's ex-girlfriend, moves in the same housing society where Aan and Harib live. Sara has a six-year-old daughter Fatima. Sara is shocked to find that the man she rejected so many years ago because of his financial status now lives in the same housing society and is a successful businessman.
8	"Episode 8"	Haseeb Hassan	Mona Haseeb	31 October 2016
Aan and Harib's friendship grows stronger. They go shopping for the special needs children and spend more time with them. Aan confides in Harib about the new proposal her mother found for her. Harib introduces Aan to Sara who is taken aback that Harib has a special friend in his life. She tells Harib about her loveless marriage and how she has finally left her husband and returned to Pakistan with her daughter. Fatima is shown as a younger version of Ayla – she is attached to her father and furious at her mother for bringing her to Pakistan and separating her from him. Like Ayla did in childhood, Fatima too has severe anger issues. She is also very stubborn and doesn't respect her mother at all. She sees her mother talking to Harib and gets extremely upset about it. Sara tells Harib about it and asks for his help.
9	"Episode 9"	Haseeb Hassan	Mona Haseeb	7 November 2016
Finally, Ayla's parents find out about her divorce and take her home. Harib tells Aan about Fatima. They make a plan to befriend Fatima and go to Sara's house together. Harib and Aan bond with Fatima really well. They take her and Sara out for dinner. Aan gently counsels Fatima to be respectful to her mother. But Sara is not happy. She tells off Harib for involving Aan in her problems. She basically wants to resume her relationship with Harib and she feels jealous that Aan is so close to him. After dropping Fatima and Sara home, Harib and Aan have a heart-to-heart conversation in the park where he tells her about what Sara said. Aan counsels him too and takes Sara's side. Sara sees them together from her balcony and her jealousy intensifies. The next day, Sara apologizes to Harib for her behaviour and shares her feelings with him. Harib tells her he can no longer have any relationship with her after what happened eight years ago.
10	"Episode 10"	Haseeb Hassan	Mona Haseeb	14 November 2016
Aan's bonding with Fatima grows stronger. Fatima even starts coming to their house. Aan helps Fatima with homework. Shabnam makes her feel like her granddaughter. Sara is still jealous of Aan and Harib's friendship. When she meets Shehroze, she lies to him about her affair with Harib and about their planned marriage. Shehroze reveals this to Ayla who feels all her misgiving about Harib were true. She then decides to ruin Harib's life and Shehroze resigns from Harib's company.
11	"Episode 11"	Haseeb Hassan	Mona Haseeb	21 November 2016
Harib again turns to Aan as he feels she's the only one who doesn't judge him or think negatively of him. He begins to realize how different Aan is from Sara and Ayla. Fatima improves her behaviour with Sara but Sara now wants Aan out of the way. She tells Shabnam she has a proposal for Aan. Sara's relative Naila brings a marriage proposal of her son Farhan for Aan. Seeing how eager Naila is, Shabnam agrees to the marriage. Harib is shocked that she has taken such a huge decision on impulse and at the same time he realizes he will lose Aan. Ayla moves into the same housing society where Aan, Harib and Sara live.
12	"Episode 12"	Haseeb Hassan	Mona Haseeb	28 November 2016
Harib goes to Sara's house and demands that she tell him about this cousin of hers. Sara doesn't answer any of Harib's questions. Sara brings Farhan and his mother and successfully gets Aan engaged with him. They all go out for dinner together and ask Harib to join them. Sara tells him about Aan's engagement and he is heartbroken. The next night, Aan goes to Harib's house while he is coming out. She asks him about his changed behaviour with her. Harib blurts out that he loves her and Aan is shocked. Ayla sees them from her balcony and snaps their photo. The next day Ayla contacts her friend and makes a fake photoshopped image of Harib and Aan. Because of this Aan is fired from her job. She breaks down in front of Harib who promises her that he will settle everything.
13	"Episode 13"	Haseeb Hassan	Mona Haseeb	5 December 2016
Harib files a case against the bank for firing Aan unfairly and starts looking for original photos that Ayla snapped. Harib also requests Aan to not tell her mother about her job because of her health. But Shabnam finds out the truth when she calls the bank to talk to Aan. She suffers a heart attack. At the hospital, Harib confronts Aan about why she told her mother but she only clings to him and cries. Farhan and Naila see her and are furious. Harib and Shehroze later overhear them talking about how Farhan divorced his wife with whom he has two kids already. Shehroze finally confronts Harib about the things Sara said and they both realize this was Sara's evil scheme to get Aan out of the way. In the hospital, Aan sees the stark difference between Farhan and Harib in the way they are helping her out in her tough time and she begins to develop feelings for Harib.
14	"Episode 14"	Haseeb Hassan	Mona Haseeb	12 December 2016
Aan begins to dislike Farhan because of his mean and indifferent attitude. Shabnam starts recovering while Farhan's mother tells her to begin the Nikkah preparation. Aan faces Ayla and tells her that due to her conspiracies she only made Harib close to her rather than separating them. Shehroze sees original photos of Aan and Harib on Ayla's laptop that she had photoshopped and emails them to himself. Farhan and Harib have a fight in which Aan openly favours Harib and tells Farhan that with him she can never have the relationship she has with Harib. Farhan tells Harib to stay away from Aan and her mother, but Aan tells him to forget about it as this will never happen. Farhan realizes that Aan loves Harib and calls his mother. But she and Sara talk him out of breaking the engagement.
15	"Episode 15"	Haseeb Hassan	Mona Haseeb	19 December 2016
Fatima overhears Sara's conversation with Farhan and her mother and gets scolded by Sara. Late night in the street Aan and Harib walk together where Harib tells Aan to always follow her heart otherwise she will have only regrets in her life. Next day, Aan, Harib and Fatima are playing together in the park when Sara and Ayla also come. Ayla starts blaming first Sara and then Aan for her failed marriage. Aan reminds her that she tried everything to save their marriage. She begs Ayla to leave her and her mother alone. She rushes away in tears. Harib and Fatima run after her, but Fatima is hit by a car. Harib takes Fatima to the hospital where he tells Ayla that marrying her was his biggest mistake and he still regrets it.
16	"Episode 16"	Haseeb Hassan	Mona Haseeb	26 December 2016
Harib consoles Sara and tells her to pray for Fatima, she calls Faisal (Fatima's father) and tells him about her accident. Shehroze tells Harib to consider second marriage as an answer to Sara and Ayla. Shaukat Qureshi comes to Shabnam's dream where the two have conversation regarding their past. Shaukat tells her that he is currently unhappy for them, he further tells her to rethink over Aan's marriage. Farhan's mother wants Shabnam to arrange the nikkah ceremony within the week. Faisal reaches Pakistan and assumes Sara and Harib's love affair looking to which Harib leaves her alone with her husband and leaves. Farhan and his mother visit Shabnam's house and start misbehaving with her.
17	"Episode 17"	Haseeb Hassan	Mona Haseeb	2 January 2017
Naila gives an ultimatum to Shabnum: hold Aan and Farhan's Nikah on Saturday (within a week) or cancel the engagement then and there. Shabnam agrees to the Nikah. Aan tells Farhan the truth about her humble background. Farhan gets scared at knowing Aan's relatives are butchers and he advises his mother to run away from this proposal. Naila thinks Aan has lied because she is not happy with this engagement. Aan is terribly unhappy and breaks down in front of Harib. Harib tells her the truth about Farhan being a father of two and that he is marrying her for her property. Aan is shocked. She resolves to tell her mother but looking at Shabnam's frail condition she stops herself. Shehroze moves out of Ayla's house.
18	"Episode 18"	Haseeb Hassan	Mona Haseeb	9 January 2017
Aan keeps looking for ways to back out of the upcoming Nikah without telling her mother the exact truth about Farhan. But Shabnam keeps blackmailing her emotionally. Harib offers to tell Shabnam the truth but Aan refuses. She has decided to compromise with the situation. She does give Sara a piece of her mind telling her off for her role in this proposal. Naila calls Sara to ask if Aan's relatives are really of a humble background and Sara lies, saying Aan has just said that to cancel the engagement. Fatima is recovering and has resumed her earlier attitude with her mother. Her father plans to take her back with him when he leaves. Ayla is all alone in her house.
19	"Episode 19"	Haseeb Hassan	Mona Haseeb	16 January 2017
Aan and Harib confess that they love each other but cannot do anything to stop the marriage. Farhan speaks to the real estate agent who shows Farhan the property papers and that the house Aan lives in is rented. Farhan realizes Aan was telling the truth. He tells Sara he only wants to marry to get out of his financial crisis and clearly Aan can't help him do that. Panicked, Sara tries to coax his mother but fails. With Harib's help, Shabnam goes ahead with the Nikah arrangements. Even though her phone calls to Naila go unattended and their house is locked, she doesn't realize that Farhan's family has no intention of turning up.
20	"Episode 20"	Haseeb Hassan	Mona Haseeb	23 January 2017
Aan's nikah day arrives. Her father's family – Khurram, his parents and sister and Sharafat Qureshi – arrives but get plenty to make fun of when Farhan's family doesn't show up. Shabnam sends Harib to fetch them but he arrives to an empty house. Farhan and his mother have left the city. Harib calls Sara but Sara is consumed with grief as her husband Faisal has obtained legal custody of Fatima and taken her away. Defeated, Harib returns to the marriage hall where almost all the guests have left. When he tells Shabnam what has happened, she suffers a heart attack and is admitted in the hospital. Harib regrets not telling her the truth beforehand.
21	"Episode 21"	Haseeb Hassan	Mona Haseeb	30 January 2017
Shabnam dies and Aan (in a semi-conscious state) is taken away by her paternal family. Khurram wants to marry Aan but Sharafat Qureshi puts his foot down and declares that Aan will only marry whoever she wants to. Aan is terribly upset that her phuppo uprooted her but Sharafat Qureshi promises to be there for her from now on. He asks her if she is interested in anyone but she says no. Harib is also upset that Aan has left and he is unable to contact her. Ayla comes to Harib's house where she has a fit. Harib calls her parents to take her away but they start blaming Harib for her condition.
22	"Episode 22"	Haseeb Hassan	Mona Haseeb and Osman Khalid Butt	6 February 2017
Ayla is institutionalized for rehabilitation. Harib apologizes to her for not doing enough to save their marriage and not realizing that she needed proper treatment. He visits her weekly and monitors her progress. Harib and Aan get married and Aan gets her job back at the bank. After some time, Aan also joins Harib in his weekly visits to Ayla.

== Music ==
Sanam OST

Soundtrack album by Shuja Haider
- Released: 28 October 2016
- Recorded: 2016
- Genre: Television soundtrack
- Length: 4:29
- Language: Urdu
- Label: M.D Productions
- Producer: Momina Duraid

The title song of Sanam was composed by musician Shuja Haider who also did background music with Bilal Allah Ditta and wrote the lyrics. The lines of the song are frequently used during the course of the show. The original soundtrack was released on 28 September 2016. The song along with production is produced by Momina Duraid under her production company M.D Productions.

The first half of the soundtrack was released on 10 September 2016 and was reduced to 1:10. The next half was released in October 2016. The soundtrack was produced along with series production by Momina Duraid under Duraid's production company M.D Productions. The OST of Sanam received critical acclaim and became the second best television OST for 2017 Television season.

=== Track listing ===
All lyrics are written by Shuja Haider; all music is composed by Shuja Haider, Bilal Allah Ditta.

No.	Title	Artist(s)	Length
1.	"Meri Sanam"	Shuja Haider	4:29

== Release ==
=== Broadcast ===
Sanam airs a weekly episode on every Monday succeeding Mann Mayal, with time slot of 8:00 pm. The show approximately airs weekly episode for 35–40 minutes (without commercials). The series was ordered 24 episodes. It was aired on Hum Europe in UK, on Hum TV USA in USA and Hum TV Mena on UAE, with same timings and premiered date. All International broadcasting aired the series in accordance with their standard times.

=== Home media and digital release ===
The show was also uploaded on YouTube alongside its airing on television but in 2017 the channel deleted all its episodes. It was also released on the iflix app as a part of channel's contract with the app but later on, on terminating the contract in 2019, all the episodes were pulled off and thus had no digital availability to stream. Moreover, it was also released on the Eros Now app. In October 2019, the channel reuploaded all its episodes with muted music.

== Reception ==
=== Television ratings ===
Number of Episodes	Timeslot (PST)	Premiere			Finale			TV Season	Overall viewership
Number of Episodes	Timeslot (PST)	Date	AVG PAK Viewers (Million)	Television Rating Points (TRP)	Date	PAK Viewers (thousands)	Television Rating Points (TRP)	TV Season	Overall viewership
22	Mondays; 08:00 pm	12 September 2016	10.1	3.42	6 February 2017	TBD	3.87	2017	TBD

Hum TV released Sanam's Television Ratings on their Facebook. Sanam opened with 10.01 million viewers on average and 3.42 TRP (Television Rating Points) for its premier. In October 2016, Sanam's rating increased to 5.62. From episode eight, the series saw another increase, reaching 5.4 TRPs. After a downfall to 3 TRPs, Sanam jumped to 5+ TRPs once again in December. In January 2017, Sanam's 19th Episode received 4.9 TRPs and 20th Episode received 4.32 TRPs but was unable to lead the time slot. With its ending episodes, Sanam received most negative reviews from the critics, the only reason to maintain TV Ratings was its leading cast.

Date	Episode Number	TRPs
12 September 2016	1	4.1
28 September 2016	3	3.3
3 October 2016	4	3.3
10 October 2016	5	4.9
24 October 2016	7	4.3
31 October 2016	8	6.2
7 November 2016	9	5.4
14 November 2016	10	4.5
26 December 2016	16	4.3
16 January 2017	19	4.9
23 January 2017	20	4.32

=== Critical appreciation ===
Sadaf Siddiqui of Dawn speaks about Sanam's plot stating that despite having a slow start Sanam highlights one of the main issues of the society, she says Mental illness, particularly bipolar disorder, needs to be dealt with sensitivity. Both patients and their families are affected. More often than not the patient feels helpless and needs support and good medical care to manage their illness. This should be Ayla's story as well.

In her same editorial Siddiqui added that The Osmaya chemistry previously seen in Diyar-e-Dil had completely lacked in the introduction episodes.

The Neurotic Writer on Medium, wrote Sanam is the first drama which highlights Bipolar Disorder and overall mental health issue in Pakistan. It's not just a love story but a story of how mental issues ruin relationships and often misunderstood in Pakistani society.

Sanam's last episode received rave reviews for its portrayal of a happy marriage that broke stereotypes. Marie Shaheen wrote These weren't just romantic scenes that someone just blended in.. but the idea behind each and every scene is so heartwarming and breaking the stereotypes truly. Each and every scene had beauty! The peace n happiness of Harib in every single frame and Aan's not just being a wife but a woman having her own identity...It was seriously so heartwarming to watch a sane dimension of husband wife in abundance of shows that portray forced and abusive husband wife relation.

The Blue Jay wrote To tell you all the truth, I'm a sucker for cute, romantic moments, and this episode was FULL OF THEM. Amazing acting by @aclockworkobi and @mayaaliofficial as always. The ending of this drama was just so satisfying. .

MZ wrote at SadafSays.com Always love watching Maya and Hareem onscreen and their chemistry is adorable to say the least. Aan realizes the need to clear out all the blues between her and Ayla so that Ayla can move ahead without any fear or guilt. The time Aan took before confronting Ayla is a subtle detail, perfectly weaved in the narrative. Surely a great sight to see one woman supporting another without any secret grudge or false aims.

== See also ==
- 2017 in Pakistani television
- List of programs broadcast by Hum TV
- Diyar-e-Dil
- Mann Mayal
