= Ruswai =

Pakistani television series

- Official title card
- رُسوائی
- Genre: Crime Drama
- Written by: Naila Ansari
- Directed by: Rubina Ashraf
- Starring: Sana Javed; Mikaal Zulfiqar
- Country of origin: Pakistan
- Original language: Urdu
- No. of episodes: 29 (list of episodes)

Production
- Producers: Humayun Saeed; Shahzad Nasib
- Production locations: Karachi, Pakistan
- Camera setup: Multi-camera setup
- Running time: 38-42 Minutes
- Production company: Six Sigma Plus

Original release
- Network: ARY Digital
- Release: 1 October 2019 – 14 April 2020

Ruswai (Urdu: رُسوائی, lit. 'Disgrace') previously titled Zard Bahar is a 2019 Pakistani crime drama television series, that originally aired on ARY Digital in 2019-20. It is produced by Humayun Saeed and Shahzad Nasib under the banner of Six Sigma Plus. Sana Javed and Mikaal Zulfiqar played the lead roles. The serial revolves around rape survivor Samira and is based on the concept of Watta Satta. It is digitally available to stream on YouTube and in some countries on VIU App.

== Plot ==
The story starts with Sameera (Sana Javed), a young doctor, who has grown up in a loving family. She has an especially close bond with her father. Sameera has an ongoing love story with Salman (Mikaal Zulfiqar) and her older brother Hamza is engaged to Salman's younger sister, Warda. Salman's mother detests Sameera's family. With her daughter already engaged to Hamza, she does not wish for Salman to also be connected to that family and tries to push her son away from Sameera. She introduces Salman to Pinky, who she believes is the girl for him. Sameera's ego is hurt by Salman's mother's taunts towards her family and decides to end their relationship. An angry Salman forces his mother to apologise to Sameera and accept her as a daughter in law. Eventually, his mother gives in and soon after Warda's marriage to Hamza, Sameera completes her Nikkah to Salman. Not long after the wedding, Sameera goes for a meal with Hamza, her father & Warda. While leaving the restaurant Hamza goes back as he realises he has left his wallet. A few boys nearby in a car are discussing their anger at being rejected by girls and decide to teach the next girl they see a lesson. They watch as Sameera is waiting outside with her father and Warda. They drive up to them, jump out of the car, one of them waving a gun while another grabs Warda. A struggle between both parties ensues as both Sameera and Warda are being grabbed by 2 boys and the father is in the middle holding on to both of them. Sameera's father loosens his grip on Sameera & shields Warda with his body. Sameera is dragged into the car. She kicks the door open as it's about to close and holds her hand out for her father to grab but he simply stares at her with tears in his eyes holding Warda. Sameera stares in disbelief before the door shuts and the car drives away. Hamza returns but is too late to save Sameera.

Sameera's mother questions the 3 of them about Sameera's whereabouts when they return home. Warda informs the mother that Sameera was kidnapped. Sameera's mother begins to shout and cry, she tells her husband and Hamza to report it to the police and find Sameera as soon as possible. Hamza and his father arrive at the police station to file a missing complaint but Sameera's father freaks out and refuses to file a complaint. Once they arrive home Hamza informs his mother that their father refused to file a complaint. An argument breaks out between both parents as the father reveals he feels ashamed filing a complaint, he doesn't want his daughter's face all over the media and the whole world to know whats happened to her. He says to the mother we should just leave our faith in God and wait for the night to end, Sameera's mother is disgusted by her husband's words. Salmans parents arrive to comfort Sameerahs family. Salman's mother tells Warda privately that she thinks its best if Sameerah dies as Sameera has lost all her respect. Warda is shocked at the harshness of her mother's words & scolds her for being so insensitive. Salman returns from his job as a pilot and is informed by a crying Warda that Sameera is missing, he walks off to his room in anger. The next morning we see Sameera waking up in a field with her clothes ripped as strangers surround her. A woman stood nearby recognises Sameera, she quickly covers Sameera's body with a scarf and brings her home. Sameera's younger sister Rohina is stood in the living room with Hamza and her mother when the woman enters with a half conscious Sameera. The next few days are difficult for Sameera as she struggles to recover from the trauma she has faced. Salman's parents & Warda come to visit Sameera but Salman refuses to see her. Both families gather in Sameerahs room. Warda asks Sameera how are you feeling prompting Sameera to lash out and reveal that her father chose to protect Warda instead of her. She accuses her father of presenting her to the rapists, she tells Hamza the rapists didn't take me, my father handed me to them. Sameera's father begins to cry and defend his actions, he claims he had no choice but to save Warda as she is his daughter in law and his best friends daughter. He asks Sameera can't you forgive your father to which Sameera replies fathers are not like this, the Sameera you knew is dead. The scene ends with the father walking out of the room in tears.

After a few days Salman finally visits Sameera. He makes it clear he doesn't want to know details on what happened to her and wishes to move forward from this incident. With her entire family against her, including Salman, Sameera is forced to stay silent and not file a police complaint. Her boss doctor Feroz is disappointed by this decision, and reminds her that she is a survivor, not a victim. Eventually, Sameera & Warda move out of their maternal homes and into their in-law homes. Sameera struggles with intimacy & suffers from nightmares. Salman feels irritated by this as it's a reminder of Sameera's rape, something which he wishes to pretend never happened. Salman forces Sameera to leave her job. Doctor Feroz refuses to accept her resignation shocked at how timid & quiet she has become. Salman disdain towards Sameera doesn't end there, he starts to insult and belittle Sameera & resorts to physical violence when she argues back. Salmans parents are aware of this but do little to defend Sameera. On one particular day after experiencing a brutal beating from Salman, Sameera is unable to leave her bed. Sameera's mother & Rohina come to visit her and are shocked to find her in such a bad state and rush her to the hospital. Doctor Feroz treats Sameera and informs her mother she must stay in hospital for a few days. When Doctor Feroz leaves, Sameerahs mother decides Sameera will not stay in hospital. Sameera's mother drops her back off at her in law home despite Sameera crying and begging her mother to take her home. Hamza is unaware of Sameera's state and is enjoying married life to its fullest with Warda who is now pregnant. The stress at home & slipping grades takes its toll on Rohina as she attempts suicide but is found in time by her parents. After recovering Sameera comes home to spend a few nights with Rohina. She gets a call that Salman's car is being towed. Sameera is confused as Salman is away for work and his car should be at the airport. Hamza and Sameera rush to identify the car where they see Salman walking out of the hotel with his hand around Pinkie. Sameera screams at Salman before leaving with Hamza. Later Salman, under threat from his father, comes to make amends with Sameera, but she makes it clear their relationship is over. Warda defends her brother's actions causing arguments between her and Hamza.

Despite protests from her parents Sameera decides to start working again & files a police complaint with Hamza supporting her. Doctor Feroz is proud of Sameera and realises he is starting to fall in love with her. Salman marries Pinky and Warda secretly sneaks out the house to attend. Rohina sees photos on Warda's phone of her at the wedding and exposes her in front of the whole family leaving Hamza and the parents furious, Sameera however is least bothered. The next day Sameera's father is distraught at how his best friend allowed Sameera to be treated even though he saved Warda, he ends up crashing the car and later dies. Sameera is angry at herself for not fixing her relationship with her father before he died & Hamza is forced by his mother to send Warda back to her home & declares their relationship to be over. Warda's mother struggles to console a heartbroken Warda while Warda's father is filled with guilt over his friend's death. Pinky is least happy to see Warda and behaves rudely towards her viewing her as a burden. Sameera scolds Hamza & her mother for treating Warda like this but they ignore her words. A few months later Warda gives birth to a baby boy. Hopes of her in laws taking her back are shattered as Hamza's mother announces she is getting Hamza remarried. In hospital after a mental breakdown, Warda begins to scream and cry. Sameera comes to hold her and consoles Warda promising her she will not let Hamza get remarried. Unbeknownst to Sameera, Salman is close by watching Sameera take care of Warda. He begins to compare Pinky and Sameera and feels guilty over how he treated Sameera. A livid Pinky asks Salman why he went to the hospital knowing Sameera was there. Salman told Pinky that he still loves Sameera and regrets leaving her. Pinky insults Salman and his family as Salman throws her out the houses. In the later episodes, she files a police complaint that Salman and his parents would physically abuse her, Salman and his parents are stunned by Pinky's lies. At home an argument breaks out between Sameera and her mum, Hamza holds his head and then drops to the ground. Warda finds out Hamza is also in hospital and rushes to meet him. She begs Hamza's mum to give her permission to meet Hamza, even placing her child in the mother's feet. Sameera picks the child up and scolds her mother for being so heartless. Doctor Feroz also advises the mother for the sake of Hamza's health Warda should be allowed to meet him to which finally Sameera's mother agrees. Warda sits next to Hamza, they talk out their problems, apologise for mistakes they've made, realising he can't live without her Hamza brings Warda and his son home.

The trial for Sameera's court case starts and Salman is informed that the boys who raped her are dangerous & are not going to take this quietly. Salman tries to reason with Sameera and informs her of the risk she is taking but Sameera refuses to listen to Salman's warnings. Outside the police station, Sameera is talking to her lawyer when one of the boys who raped her points at gun at her. Salman pushes Sameera out the way and takes the bullet to his chest. Police officers around then kill the rapist before he attempts to shoot again. Sameera rushes Salman to the hospital and on the way Salman professes his love and asks for her forgiveness. Sameera tells him she has forgiven him for everything. Unfortunately, Salman dies in the hospital.

The show forwards to a few years later and we see Sameera walking out the court case surrounded by her family as the judge announces he finds the defendants guilty of rape. Sameera goes to the hospital to meet her husband Doctor Feroz. As she is speaking to Feroz Mukhtaran Mai, a survivor of gang rape and prominent advocate in Pakistan for women's rights, walks into the hospital and congratulates Sameera on her victory. Sameera hugs Mukhtaran and the show ends.

== Cast ==
- Sana Javed as Dr. Sameerah
- Mikaal Zulfiqar as Captain Salman
- Seemi Raheel as Zakiya; Sameera's mama
- Syed Mohmmad Ahmed as Mehmood; Sameera's father
- Irsa Ghazal as Salma; Salman's mother
- Usman Peerzada as Ariz Khan; Salman's father
- Osama Tahir as Hamza; Sameera's brother
- Minna Tariq as Wardah; Salman's sister
- Fahima Awan as Madiha; Sameerah's friend
- Natalia Awais as Rohina; Sameera's sister
- Shermeen Ali as Pinky; Salman's friend
- Adnan Jaffar as Dr. Feroze; Sameera's second husband
- Tara Mehmood as Dr. Feroze's deceased brothers wife
- Mukhtaran Mai as herself; special appearance
- Durdana Butt as Amma
- Mustafa Changazi as Sunny

== Awards and nominations ==
Year	Award	Category	Recipient(s) and nominee(s)	Result	Ref
7 February 2020	1st Pakistan International Screen Awards	Best Television Play	Six Sigma Plus	Nominated	
7 February 2020	1st Pakistan International Screen Awards	Best Television Actress	Sana Javed	Nominated	
7 February 2020	1st Pakistan International Screen Awards	Best Television Actress Critics choice	Sana Javed	Won	
7 February 2020	1st Pakistan International Screen Awards	Best Television Writer	Naila Ansari	Nominated	
March, 2021	ARY People's Choice Awards	Favorite Drama Serial-Regular	Six Sigma Plus	Nominated	
March, 2021	ARY People's Choice Awards	Favorite Director	Rubina Ashraf	Nominated	
March, 2021	ARY People's Choice Awards	Favorite Actress in a role of Bhabhi	Minna Tariq	Nominated	
March, 2021	ARY People's Choice Awards	Favorite Emerging Talent (Female)	Minna Tariq	Nominated	
March, 2021	ARY People's Choice Awards	Favorite Emerging Talent (Male)	Osama Tahir	Won	
March, 2021	ARY People's Choice Awards	Favorite Actor in a role of Bhai	Osama Tahir	Nominated	
March, 2021	ARY People's Choice Awards	Favorite Actor	Mikaal Zulfiqaar	Nominated	
March, 2021	ARY People's Choice Awards	Favorite Actor in a role of Damad	Mikaal Zulfiqaar	Nominated	
March, 2021	ARY People's Choice Awards	Favorite Actress	Sana Javed	Nominated	
March, 2021	ARY People's Choice Awards	Favorite Actress in a role of Wife	Sana Javed	Nominated	
March, 2021	ARY People's Choice Awards	Favorite Actress in a role of Nand	Sana Javed	Won	
March, 2021	ARY People's Choice Awards	Favorite Actress in a role of Saas	Irsa Ghazal	Nominated	
March, 2021	ARY People's Choice Awards	Favorite Actress in a role of Saas	Seemi Raheel	Nominated	
March, 2021	ARY People's Choice Awards	Favorite Actress in a role of Maa	Irsa Ghazal	Nominated	
March, 2021	ARY People's Choice Awards	Favorite Actress in a role of Maa	Seemi Raheel	Nominated	
March, 2021	ARY People's Choice Awards	Favorite Actor in a role of Baap	Mohammad Ahmed	Won	
March, 2021	ARY People's Choice Awards	Favorite Actor in a role of Sasur	Mohammad Ahmed	Nominated	
March, 2021	ARY People's Choice Awards	Favorite Actor in a role of Sasur	Usman Peerzada	Nominated	
March, 2021	ARY People's Choice Awards	Favorite Actress in a role of Bahen	Natalia Awais	Nominated	
March, 2021	ARY People's Choice Awards	Favorite Jori	Mikaal Zulfiqar and Sana Javed	Nominated	
