= Laut Ke Chalay Aana =

2017 Pakistani television series

- Title screen of the serial
- Written by: Shahzad Javed
- Directed by: ZEEKAY
- Starring: Noman Ejaz; Savera Nadeem; Shermeen Ali; Arisha Razi
- Theme music composer: Shahbaz Khan
- Opening theme: O Laut Kay Chale Aana; Singer(s); Bushra Bilal; Lyrics by Shahbaz Khan
- Country of origin: Pakistan
- Original language: Urdu
- No. of episodes: 24

Production
- Producers: Asif Noor; Dr. Huma Khan
- Camera setup: Multi-camera setup
- Production company: Zeekay Films

Original release
- Network: Geo TV
- Release: 5 July – 20 December 2017

Laut Ke Chalay Aana (Urdu: لوٹ کے چلے آنا, lit. 'Return to me') is a Pakistani family drama series, produced by Asif Noor and Dr Huma. The drama airs weekly on Geo Entertainment every Wednesday. It is written by Shahzad Javed (Currently Assistant Vice President Content, HUM TV, Pakistan) It stars Noman Ijaz, Savera Nadeem, Minal Khan, Shermeen Ali and Arisha Razi in lead roles. Serial marks return of Savera Nadeem to small screen after short series of break. The show did not get that good TRPs in competition to Hum TV and ARY Digital in the same slot and was ended early.

== Plot ==
Not every marriage gets a happily ever after and so is the case with Zainab and Farhan. When Zainab embraces motherhood, she starts taking her role as a wife for granted whilst Farhan, too, becomes oblivious of his part as a husband.

Laut Ke Chalay Aana tackles the sensitive issue of incompatibility between married couples. Despite staying married for several years and having two grown-up daughters, the couple doesn’t realise when they lost the spark and grew distant. They hardly talk to each other and most of their interactions turn into arguments.

In one of those days, a young, modern working woman enters Ijaz's life and makes him realise what's missing. He is inclined towards her and eventually proposes her. With this, Zainab’s world throws her off balance.

== Cast ==
- Noman Ijaz as Farhan
- Savera Nadeem as Zainab
- Minal Khan as Khadija
- Arisha Razi as Ayesha
- Seemi Pasha as Shamim
- Shermeen Ali as Abeera
- Ahmed Zeb as Rizwan
- Hajra Khan as Naseem
- Tara Mahmood as Aqeela
