= Amaan Ramazan =

- Amaan Ramazan logo on startup.
- No. of episodes: 30

Release
- Original network: Geo TV
- Original release: 11 July – 8 August 2013

Season chronology
- ← Previous; 2012 Next → 2014

Amaan Ramazan or Amaan Ramadan (Urdu: امان رمضان) (Peace in Ramadan) was a live television show on Geo TV hosted by Aamir Liaquat Hussain. It was the most popular programme of 2013.

== Controversy ==
Aamir Liaquat Hussain handed over abandoned infants from Chhipa Welfare Association to parents who wanted to adopt babies. Background checks were done by Chhipa welfare association and no legal agency was involved in the checks. The babies were then handed over to the parents during the show.

The concern that lack of confidentiality could expose the children and their families to teasing and stigma in the future was raised in media. Seema Jamali, assistant director of child welfare for the Sindh provincial government said, "The baby was given away the same way as a gift. Though it was good to find parents for her, the baby was given like a car, laptop, or motorcycle. It's an insult to the baby and the parents. It should have been done quietly."

== See also ==
- Inaam Ghar
