= Sheikh Liaquat Hussain =

Pakistani politician

Member of the National Assembly of Pakistan
- In office 15 February 1997 – 12 October 1999
- Constituency: NA-195 (Karachi East-IV)

Personal details
- Born: 1929; Agra, British India
- Died: 23 September 2009 (aged 79–80); Karachi, Pakistan
- Political party: Muttahida Qaumi Movement
- Spouse: Ghousia Mehmooda Sultana
- Children: 2 including Aamir Liaquat

Sheikh Liaquat Hussain (1929 – 23 September 2009) was a Pakistani politician who was a Member of the National Assembly of Pakistan from 1997 to 1999.

== Early life and career ==
Hussain was born in 1929. He married Ghousia Mahmooda Sultana from whom he had two sons named Imran Liaquat and Aamir Liaquat Hussain, who was a Pakistani television host and politician.

He was elected to the National Assembly of Pakistan from Constituency NA-195 (Karachi East-IV) as a candidate of Haq Parast Group (MQM) in the 1997 Pakistani general election.

== Death ==
Hussain died on 23 September 2009 in Karachi at the age of 80.
