= Waada (TV series) =

Pakistani television series

- Waada_TV_Serial
- Genre: Romance, drama
- Starring: Shaista Lodhi; Faysal Qureshi; Saboor Ali
- Theme music composer: Falak Shabir
- Country of origin: Pakistan
- Original language: Urdu
- No. of episodes: 23

Production
- Producers: Big Bang Entertainment, Fahad Mustafa, and Dr. Ali Kazmi.
- Production locations: Karachi; Jeddah

Original release
- Network: ARY Digital
- Release: 8 November 2016 – 12 April 2017

Waada (Urdu: وعدہ, lit. 'Promise') is a Pakistani drama television series directed by Syed Atif Hussain, written by Samina Ejaz. It originally aired on ARY Digital in 2016.

== Cast ==
- Shaista Lodhi as Sumaira
- Faisal Qureshi as Shahab
- Saboor Ali as Jaana
- Ismat Iqbal as Nuzhat
- Srha Asghar as Uzma
- Anum Tanveer as Lubna
- Fahad Sheikh
- Hassan Ahmed
- Ghazala Butt
- Amir Qureshi

== Plot ==
Sumaira is a loving wife, mother, and daughter-in-law. She cares for everyone in the family and tries to do as much as she can for everyone at home. She makes an effort to fulfill her promise and excel in every relationship. Loyalty is all that she has to offer besides so much love.

Shahab is financially very secure as he is a rich businessman, but along with that, he also cares for his entire family; basically, he's a good husband. He promises his wife that he will never leave her, no matter what, and stand by her side in all the ups and downs.

Jaana is the maid's daughter who was fired from her previous job due to falling for the owner's son, who hated her. Jaana hunts for her next victim, who turns out to be Shahab, and disrupts his life. She schemes against Sumaira till Shahab too falls for her and she ends up marrying him.

== See also ==
- List of programs broadcast by ARY Digital
- 2016 in Pakistani television
