= Aamir Liaquat Hussain =

Pakistani TV host and politician (1971–2022)

Member of the National Assembly of Pakistan
- In office 13 August 2018 – 9 June 2022
- Preceded by: Haleem Adil Sheikh
- Succeeded by: Mahmood Moulvi
- Constituency: NA-249 (Karachi-XI)
- In office 21 November 2002 – 5 July 2007
- Succeeded by: Farooq Sattar
- Constituency: NA-245 (Karachi-XVI)

Minister of State for Religious Affairs
- In office 5 September 2004 – 5 July 2007
- President: Pervez Musharraf
- Prime Minister: Shaukat Aziz

Personal details
- Born: 5 July 1971 Karachi, Sindh, Pakistan
- Died: 9 June 2022 (aged 50) Karachi, Sindh, Pakistan
- Party: PTI (2018-2021)
- Other political affiliations: MQM-L (1997-2016)
- Spouse(s): Bushra Iqbal (div. 2020) Tuba Aamir (m. 2018; div. 2022) Dania Shah (m. 2022–2022).
- Children: 2
- Parent: Sheikh Liaquat Hussain (father)
- Occupation: TV show host; politician; columnist
- Website: AamirLiaquat.com

Aamir Liaquat Hussain (Urdu: عامر لیاقت حسین; 5 July 1971 – 9 June 2022) was a Pakistani politician, columnist, and television host. One of Pakistan's most prominent television hosts, he was included in three editions of The 500 Most Influential Muslims.

Hussain served as a member of the National Assembly of Pakistan for Muttahida Qaumi Movement (MQM) from 2002 to 2007 and as Minister of State for Religious Affairs from 2004 to 2007 in the cabinet of Prime Minister Shaukat Aziz. He again served in the National Assembly from August 2018 to June 2022 as a member of the Pakistan Tehreek-e-Insaf (PTI).

Hussain died of suffocation at his home on 9 June 2022.

== Early life and education ==
Hussain was born on 5 July 1971 in Karachi, Sindh, to Sheikh Liaquat Hussain, a politician, and columnist Mahmooda Sultana.

=== Education and fraudulent degrees ===
In 2002, Hussain stated in his nomination forms for that year's general election that he held a bachelor's degree in Islamic studies from Trinity College and University. It was later reported that Hussain had purchased the degree in order to become eligible for election to the National Assembly. The requirement stemmed from a 2002 law requiring candidates for election to hold at least a bachelor's degree. In 2003, The Guardian reported that Trinity College and University offered degrees that could be obtained within 28 days for as little as £125.

In 2005, the University of Karachi declared that his degree was not recognised. In 2006, the Higher Education Commission of Pakistan also announced that it would not recognise his degree, as Trinity College and University was not an accredited educational institution in the United States. Hussain's claim to have received an MBBS degree from Liaquat Medical College Jamshoro in 1995 was also disputed.

In 2012, it was reported that Hussain graduated from the University of Karachi in 2008 with a Bachelor of Arts. In 2010, he enrolled at the Federal Urdu University of Arts, Science & Technology, where he obtained a master's degree in Islamic Studies. However, according to university officials, he had never attended classes or taken any exams. The officials also said that his admission form had been submitted with a photograph of another person, which was later replaced with one of Hussain.

In 2015, it was reported that Hussain had obtained a fake degree from Ashwood University, a diploma mill based in Pakistan. According to the Federal Investigation Agency, his profile was found in the main server of Axact, a company known for selling fraudulent degrees. In June 2015, he admitted to purchasing the fake degree from Ashwood University for $1136.

== Political career ==
=== Muttahida Qaumi Movement (2002–2008) ===
Hussain was elected to the National Assembly of Pakistan in the 2002 general election as a member of the Muttahida Qaumi Movement for the NA-249 constituency in Karachi. In September 2004, he was appointed Minister of State for Religious Affairs and Zakat and Ushr Division in the cabinet of Prime Minister Shaukat Aziz. In May 2005, he called on religious scholars to issue a fatwa on suicide bombings. In June 2005, he was attacked by a group of youths during a visit to Jamia Binoria. Police later stated that no physical altercation had occurred, and that the crowd had only chanted slogans.

Hussain served as Minister of State for Religious Affairs until July 2007, when he resigned from the National Assembly, citing personal reasons. Sources within the party suggested that his resignation was related to controversial statements he had made about novelist Salman Rushdie. In 2008, MQM officially expelled him, alleging that he had promoted views that went against the party's values.

In August 2016, Hussain was detained by Sindh Rangers following the attack on media houses by MQM workers and the arrest of MQM leaders. In February 2017, an Anti-Terrorism Court ordered that Hussain be placed on the Exit Control List after he was charged with facilitating hate speech for helping organise a speech by MQM founder Altaf Hussain.

=== Pakistan Tehreek-e-Insaf (2018–2021) ===
Hussain joined Pakistan Tehreek-e-Insaf (PTI) in March 2018. He was re-elected to the National Assembly as the PTI candidate for NA-245 (Karachi East-IV) in the 2018 general election. On 4 October 2021, he resigned from his seat and announced his departure from the party.

On 6 April 2022, Hussain tweeted that he was "extremely embarrassed" for having betrayed Altaf Hussain, suggesting a potential return to MQM.

== Media career ==
Hussain was a radio broadcaster on FM101. He was known for hosting Ramadan transmissions. He begain his television career at the Pakistan Television Corporation but was fired shortly afterwards. In 2001, he joined Geo TV and began hosting the religious program Aalim Online.

In 2010, Hussain left Geo TV and joined ARY Digital Network as managing director of ARY Qtv and as executive director of ARY Digital. He also hosted religious program Aalim Aur Aalam on the network. After returning to Geo TV, he hosted Pehchan Ramazan in 2012 and Amaan Ramazan in 2013. In January 2014, he became the vice-president of Geo TV and hosted the game show Inaam Ghar.

Hussain founded the Memhooda Sultana Foundation. From 2013 to 2015, he was included in the annual publication The 500 Most Influential Muslims, published by the Royal Islamic Strategic Studies Centre in Jordan.

In June 2014, Hussain joined the Express Media Group as president and group editor of religious content on Daily Express, and hosted Pakistan Ramazan. He later rejoined Geo TV, where he began hosting Subh-e-Pakistan in November 2014. He became president of Geo Entertainment in November 2015.

In 2016, Hussain joined the BOL media group and began hosting the current affairs programme Aisay Nahi Chalay Ga. In 2017, he hosted Ramazan Mein BOL and Game Show Aisay Chalay Ga. He left the network in November 2017.

In January 2016, it was reported that Hussain would make his Pakistani film debut alongside Saima Noor in an upcoming film directed by Syed Noor. In April 2019, he announced that he would portray Burhan Wani in Ayub Khoso's upcoming film based on the Kashmir conflict. In 2019, he joined the Pakistan Television Corporation. In April 2020, he started hosting the game show Jeeway Pakistan on Express TV.

== Controversies ==
In 2008, Hussain was criticised for hosting a television special in which two guest scholars declared Ahmadi Muslims, a minority sect of Islam, to be "deserving of death". Within 48 hours of the broadcast, two prominent members of the Ahmadi community were shot dead. Several commentators argued that Hussain bore some responsibility for the killings, although he denied any wrongdoing or connection to them.

In 2010, Hussain claimed that the Pakistan national cricket team's recent losses were due to the green soles of the players' shoes. He argued that, because green is the colour of Pakistan's flag and the dome of Muhammad's tomb, the shoes were disrespectful to Islam and had brought divine punishment upon the team. The claim was criticised by viewers and media outlets.

In 2011, a compilation of behind-the-scenes footage from Hussain's show was leaked online. In the footage, he used profanities, downplayed the severity of rape and suicide, and mocked guests. Hussain claimed that the video had been doctored and released either by his former employer, Geo TV, or by opposing religious groups. However, he later stated that the video showed his "lighter side".

In 2013, Hussain was criticised for giving away abandoned infants as prizes during his game show Amaan Ramazan, which critics argued was an attempt to boost the show's ratings. Childless couples were chosen as contestants, and background checks were carried out by the Chhipa Welfare Association. Child welfare advocates expressed concern that other shows would imitate the initiative and that the children and their families could face stigma because of the publicity surrounding the adoptions. Hussain denied that the initiative was intended to increase ratings, calling it a "noble cause".

In 2014, Hussain was criticised after agreeing with a guest cleric on his show who described Ahmadi Muslims as the "enemy of Pakistan", the second time the religious group had been denounced on one of his programmes. Geo TV later apologized for the incident, stating that the remarks violated the network's code of conduct. Five days after the broadcast, an Ahmadi man was shot and killed in Gujranwala.

In June 2016, the Pakistan Electronic Media Regulatory Authority (PEMRA) suspended Hussain from hosting his Ramadan programme for three days after an episode of the show depicting the suicide of a young girl led to hundreds of complaints from viewers.

In January 2017, social activist and lawyer Mohammad Jibran Nasir filed a complaint with PEMRA, alleging that Hussain had conducted a "malicious, defamatory and life endangering campaign" against him. PEMRA subsequently banned Hussain from appearing on the BOL News network in any capacity, citing hundreds of complaints about his hateful remarks. Later that month, Hussain alleged that actor Om Puri had been murdered by Prime Minister Narendra Modi and National Security Advisor Ajit Doval.

In March 2017, Amnesty International criticised Pakistan's government for failing to act against Hussain over remarks that allegedly endangered lives of journalists, and bloggers, and social activists, and called on Interior Minister Chaudhary Nisar Ali Khan to take action. The same month, PEMRA directed Hussain to issue an on-air apology for previous hate speech.

On 12 December 2017, it was announced that Hussain would return to television on 24 News HD. The following day, however, PEMRA banned him from appearing in all broadcast media over allegations of hate speech. The ban was lifted by the Supreme Court on 7 February 2018. On 26 May 2018, Hussain received a 30-day ban from PEMRA for inciting "unwarranted drama on the basis of religion."

In May 2020, Hussain apologised for insensitive comments about the deaths of actress Sridevi and actor Irrfan Khan.

== Personal life ==
Hussain was married three times. He had two children with his first wife, Bushra Aamir. In June 2018, he married Tuba Anwar; the marriage lasted about three years. In February 2022, he married 18-year-old Dania Shah. In May 2022, Shah filed for divorce after three months of marriage. In December 2022, Shah was arrested by the FIA for leaking his private data on social media.

=== Death ===
Hussain died on 9 June 2022 in Karachi. According to a household servant, Hussain was heard screaming in pain from his locked room. After receiving no response, the servant forced the door open and found him unconscious. Hussain was taken to Agha Khan Hospital, where he was pronounced dead on arrival.

Police initially suspected that he had died from suffocation caused by smoke from a household generator, although the official cause of death was not confirmed. His funeral prayer was held on 10 June 2022 and was led by his son Ahmed Aamir. He was buried at Abdullah Shah Ghazi graveyard.

Hussain's family refused to consent to an autopsy. On 18 June 2022, a local court ordered Hussain's exhumation for a post-mortem examination following a petition filed by a private citizen. On 16 August 2022, the same court annulled the order, and no autopsy was performed.

== Publications ==
Hussain's publications include:

- Merī āvāz sāre zamāne kī ṣadā hai, Urdu: میری آواز سارے زمانے کی صدا ہے,1989, 64 p. Patriotic poetry.
- Islam and terrorism : an historical and theological enquiry, ، 2002, 142 p.
- Hamārī mān̲ K̲h̲adīja tul Kubrá, Urdu: ہماری ماں خدیجہ الکبری، 2009, 900 p. On the life and eminence of Khadījah, d. ca. 619, first wife of Muhammad, d. 632.
- Lāʼūḍ ispīkar, Urdu: لاؤڈ سپیکر، 2009, 2 volumes. Collection of articles on social and political conditions of Pakistan; published from 2005 to 2008 in Daily Jang, Rawalpindi, Pakistan.
- Ās̲ār-i qiyāmat, Urdu: آثار قیامت، 2010, 2 volumes. On the Judgment Day in Islam.
