= Inaam Ghar Plus =

Pakistani TV game show (2014–2017)

- Title screen
- انعام گھر
- Genre: Game show
- Presented by: Aamir Liaquat Hussain
- Country of origin: Pakistan
- Original language: Urdu
- No. of episodes: 18

Production
- Production locations: Karachi, Pakistan
- Running time: 180 minutes

Original release
- Network: Geo Entertainment
- Release: 18 January 2014 – 2017

Related
- Amaan Ramazan; Pakistan Ramazan; Bazm E Tariq Aziz

Inaam Ghar Plus (Urdu: انعام گھر, English The Awards House) was a Geo Entertainment's presented television game show in Pakistan. It is based in Karachi and was hosted by Aamir Liaquat Hussain. The show returned on 13 February 2015 on Geo TV as part of Liaquat's return to the network.

== Production ==
After the success of Amaan Ramazan at Geo TV, channel announced on 17 January 2014 that registration has opened and will be done through SMS and the show will air two days a week. It will be aired live at Geo TV on Saturday and Thursday at 7:30 PM for three hours. The first episode of the show was aired on 18 January 2014.

== Controversy ==
On 27 June 2016, Pakistan Electronic Media Regulatory Authority (PEMRA) barred Aamir Liaquat from hosting his Ramadan show 'Inam Ghar' for three days on Geo Entertainment, for having aired a reenactment, during the 6 June episode, of a girl committing suicide.

On 28 June 2016, the Sindh High Court (SHC) nullified the PEMRA notification of imposing a three-day ban. But PEMRA approached the Supreme Court against the order of Sindh High Court (SHC) which had suspended its ban on the private channel's program. Later on 4 July 2016, a two-member bench of the Supreme Court directed PEMRA to conclude the matter about ban on Geo TV's program 'Inam Ghar' within a month.

== Segments ==
- Palna
- Mufta
- Zor Laga Ke Bhaiyya
- Pakistan Ideal
- Kaar War Lay Ja Mery Yaar
- Lagao Tukka
- Chulbulay
- Ghar Aye Mehman
- Chatt Patt Chatta Chat, Safa Chatt Fata Fat
- Khel Kar Jeeto
- Jhat Sawal Patt Jawab

== See also ==
- Bazm E Tariq Aziz
- Jeet Ka Dum
- Jeeto Pakistan
