= Jeeto Pakistan =

Pakistani game show

- Also known as: Jeeto Pakistan League
- جیتو پاکستان
- Genre: Family-friendly game show Reality show
- Created by: Salman Iqbal
- Directed by: Asif Khan; Khurram Farid
- Presented by: Fahad Mustafa
- Country of origin: Pakistan
- Original language: Urdu
- No. of seasons: 10
- No. of episodes: 1,200+

Production
- Production locations: Karachi, Sindh, Pakistan
- Editor: ARY Digital
- Camera setup: Multiple-camera setup
- Running time: 130–152 minutes

Original release
- Network: ARY Digital
- Release: May 18, 2014

Related
- Jeeto Pakistan League

Jeeto Pakistan (Urdu: جیتو پاکستان; transl. Win Pakistan) is a Pakistani game show, hosted by actor Fahad Mustafa on ARY Digital. The show was launched on May 18, 2014 created by Salman Iqbal. It has been called the "biggest game show" in Pakistan. Jeeto Pakistan's participants are selected randomly from a studio audience who require passes to attend the show.

== Overview ==
The show is divided into several segments, each offering contestants prizes in return for winning a set of challenges or game tasks given by the host. The prizes offered range from cars and motorcycles to gold, cash, vacation packages, and household items. The show is funded by sponsors, advertisers, and commercial brands.

Jeeto Pakistan occasionally broadcast the program in other cities, with some shows held in Lahore, Islamabad, Peshawar, Faisalabad, Multan, and Dubai.

During the month of Ramadan every year, the show runs a daily transmission scheduled every night.

== Seasons overview ==
Series	Episodes	Originally released (Pakistan)	
Series	Episodes	First released	Last released
1	761	18 May 2014	19 September 2021
2	130+	31 October 2021	17 August 2023
3	320+	20 August 2023	TBA

Jeeto Pakistan is ten seasons long, the episodes per season is unknown.

== Episodes ==
- As of 1,208 Episodes

== Cast ==
=== Main ===
- Fahad Mustafa as Host (2014–present)

=== Recurring ===
- Aadi Adeal Amjad as Salman (2020–present)
- Ahmad Shah and Umer Shah as Treasure Box Pirate/Candy Boy (2019–present)
- Fabiha Sherazi as an assistant (2014–2017)
- Adnan Siddiqui as Lahore Falcon's captain (2020–present)
- Shoaib Malik as Multan Tiger's Captain (2021–present)
- Shaista Lodhi as Peshawar Stallion's captain (2020–present)
- Sana Javed as Karachi Lion's captain (2025–present)
- Aijaz Aslam as Quetta Knight's captain/Gujranwala Bulls captain (2021)/(2022–present)
- Shoaib Malik as Quetta Knight's captain
- Humayun Saeed as Karachi Lion's captain/Quetta Knight's captain (2020–2021)/(2023)
- Kubra Khan as Islamabad dragon's captain (2024–present)

=== Special guest appearances ===
- Aadi Adeal Amjad
- Adnan Siddiqui
- Agha Ali
- Ahmed Ali Butt
- Ahmad Shah
- Ahmed Shehzad
- Ahsan Khan
- Aijaz Aslam
- Aiman Khan
- Ali Rehman Khan
- Ali Safina
- Ali Zafar
- Amar Khan
- Amna Ilyas
- Areeba Habib
- Arez Ahmed
- Asad Shafiq
- Asad Siddiqui
- Asim Azhar
- Ayaz Samoo
- Ayesha Omar
- Ayeza Khan
- Azfar Rehman
- Babar Azam
- Behroze Sabzwari
- Bilal Abbas
- Bilal Ashraf
- Bushra Ansari
- Danish Taimoor
- Dur-e-Fishan Saleem
- Emmad Irfani
- Eshal Fayyaz
- Fahad Mirza
- Fahad Shaikh
- Faysal Qureshi
- Fatima Fahad
- Farhan Saeed
- Feroze Khan
- Goher Mumtaz
- Gohar Rasheed
- Hajra Yamin
- Hania Amir
- Hareem Farooq
- Hassan Ahmed
- Hiba Bukhari
- Hina Dilpazeer
- Hira Mani
- Humayun Saeed
- Imad Wasim
- Iman Ali
- Imran Ashraf
- Iqra Aziz
- Iqrar Ul Hassan
- Javed Sheikh
- Junaid Jamshed
- Junaid Khan
- Kamran Akmal
- Kinza Hashmi
- Kubra Khan
- Madiha Naqvi
- Mahenur Haider Khan
- Mahira Khan
- Mansha Pasha
- Mawra Hocane
- Maya Ali
- Mahnoor Baloch
- Mehwish Hayat
- Mikaal Zulfiqar
- Minal Khan
- Moammar Rana
- Mohib Mirza
- Mohsin Abbas Haider
- Momal Sheikh
- Muhammad Amir
- Muhammad Faizan Sheikh
- Muneeb Butt
- Mushk Kaleem
- Nabeel Zafar
- Nadia Khan
- Naveen Waqar
- Nazish Jahangir
- Neelam Muneer
- Nimra Khan
- Osman Khalid Butt
- Pehlaaj Hassan
- Rabia Butt
- Ramsha Khan
- Saba Qamar
- Saboor Aly
- Salahuddin Tunio
- Sami Khan
- Sana Javed
- Sanam Jung
- Sanam Saeed
- Sarfaraz Ahmed
- Sarwat Gilani
- Sara Loren
- Shafaat Ali
- Shahid Afridi
- Shahood Alvi
- Shaista Lodhi
- Shakeel Siddiqui
- Shaniera Akram
- Sheheryar Munawar
- Shehroz Sabzwari
- Shehzad Roy
- Shehzad Sheikh
- Shoaib Akhtar
- Shoaib Malik
- Sohai Ali Abro
- Sonya Hussyn
- Sumbul Iqbal
- Sunita Marshall
- Syed Jibran
- Umar Akmal
- Urwa Hocane
- Ushna Shah
- Uzma Khan
- Vasay Chaudhry
- Wahab Riaz
- Waseem Badami
- Wasim Akram
- Yasir Hussain
- Yumna Zaidi
- Vaneeza Ahmad
- Zara Noor Abbas
- Ahsan Khan
- Sadaf Kanwal
- Aamir Liaquat Hussain
- Amjad Sabri
- Arshad Sharif
- Maria Memon

== Criticism ==
The show was criticised for promoting a culture of chance, luck, and effortless rewards, where participants are required to put their dignity at stake. The show's host distributes material goods, but at the expense of public humiliation. The program targets a specific class of society, exploiting their desperation for monetary benefits. Ultimately, it perpetuates a flawed value system, encouraging people to prioritize luck over hard work and dignity.

== Jeeto Pakistan League ==
In the Ramadan season of 2020, the show's format was changed in light of the coronavirus pandemic and the studio audience was eliminated. Instead, a "league"-based format was introduced where teams representing five major cities would compete against each other, with each team led by a notable celebrity. New contestants would be drawn for each episode while maintaining social distancing, and the top two teams with most points would qualify for a final play-off. Members of the public would be able to participate in the show through live calls.

In 2021, Multan Tigers was introduced as 6th team of Jeeto Pakistan League. Shoaib Malik was selected as the new team's captain. Sarfraz Ahmed was replaced by Aijaz Aslam as the captain of Quetta Knights team.

In 2022, Ushna Shah joined the league after replacing Humayun Saeed as Karachi lion’s captain. Sarfaraz Ahmed returned as the captain of Quetta knight and Aijaz Aslam was assigned a new team named Gujranwala Bulls.

== See also ==
- Croron Mein Khel
