= Pakistani clothing =

Variety of ethnic and cultural clothing worn by the people of Pakistan

Clothing in Pakistan is influenced by the various cultural exchanges in the nation's history, and also may vary by ethnicity, reflecting their diverse cultures, regions, and ethnic backgrounds. Pakistani clothing expresses the culture of Pakistan. The clothing reflect weather conditions, way of living, the textiles and embroidery used and its distinctive style which gives it a unique identity among all cultures. Traditional dresses for both men and women tend to cover the whole body, with trousers gathered at the waist, a loose shirt or dress, and some form of head covering.

== National dress ==
The shalwar kameez, achkan, sherwani and kurta shalwar kameez are the national dresses of Pakistan worn by men and women in all regions. Shalwar refers to loose trousers and kameez refers to shirts. Since 1982, all officials working in the secretariat are required to wear the national dress. Each province has its own variant of salwar kameez. Pakistanis wear clothes ranging from exquisite colours and designs to various types of fabric such as silk, chiffon, cotton, etc.

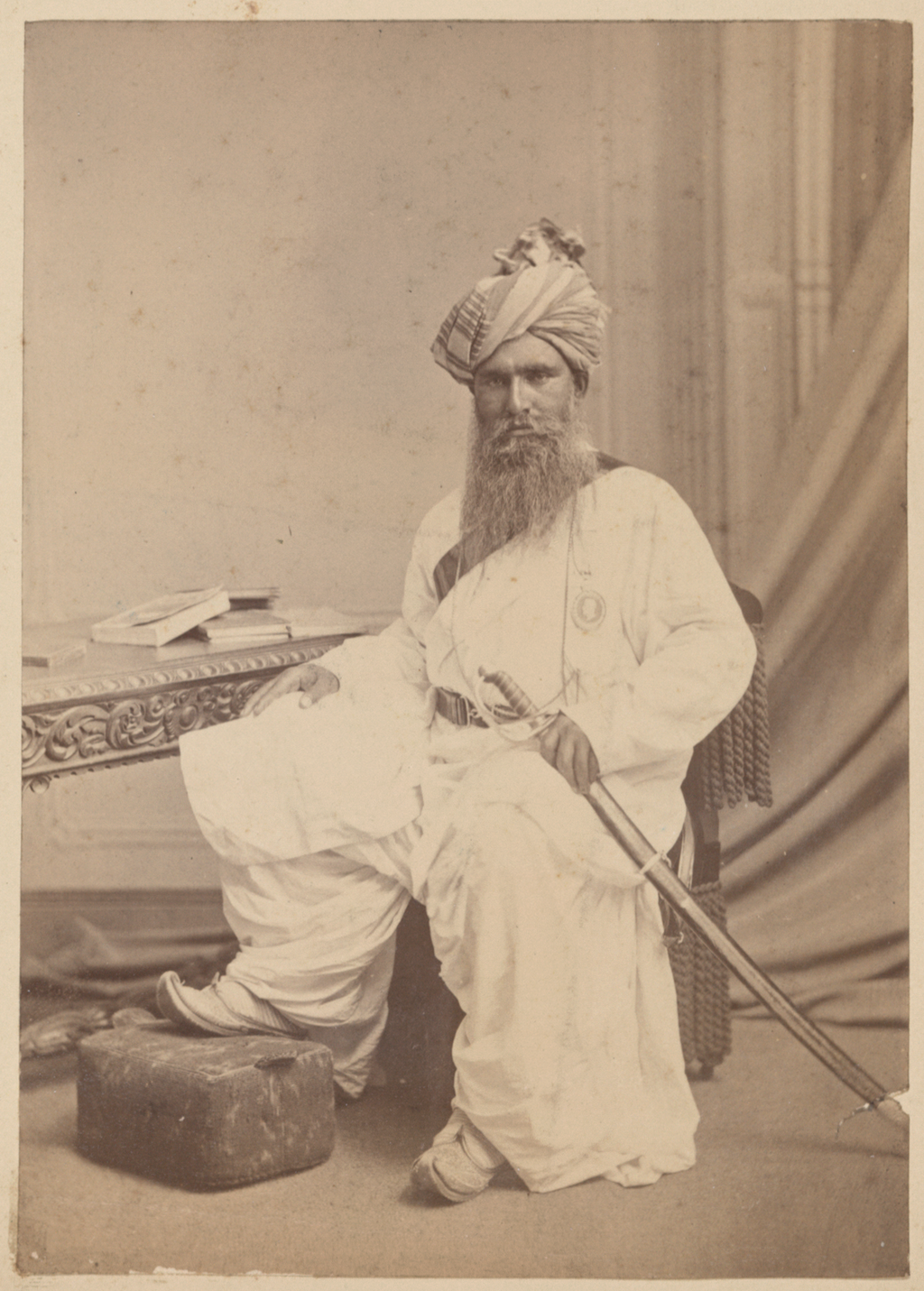
Traditional Khet partug. (Traditional loose shalwar worn in Khyber Pakhtunkhwa) (1842)

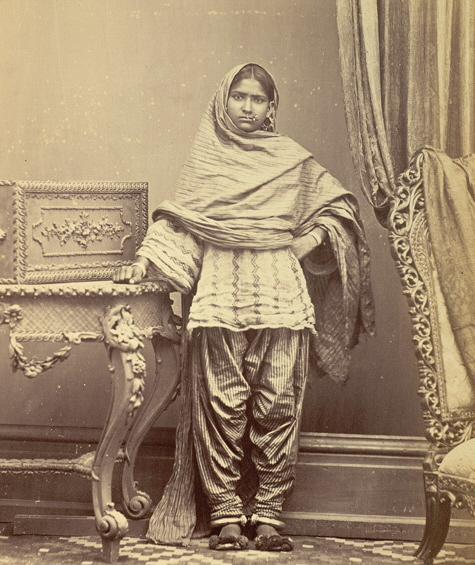
Girl from Karachi, Sind, in narrow Sindhi Soossi suthan and cholo. c. 1870.

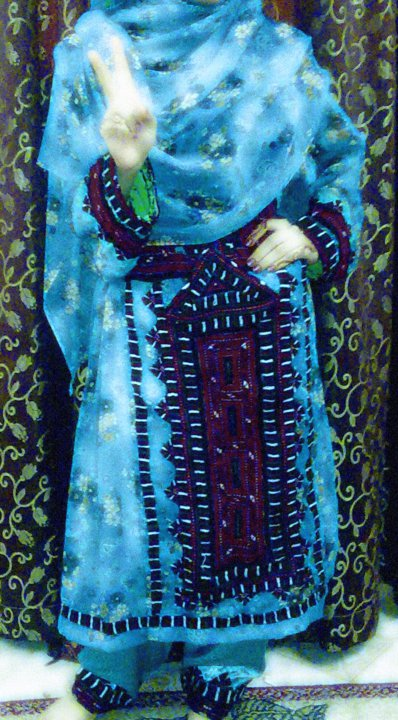
Balochi traditional dress

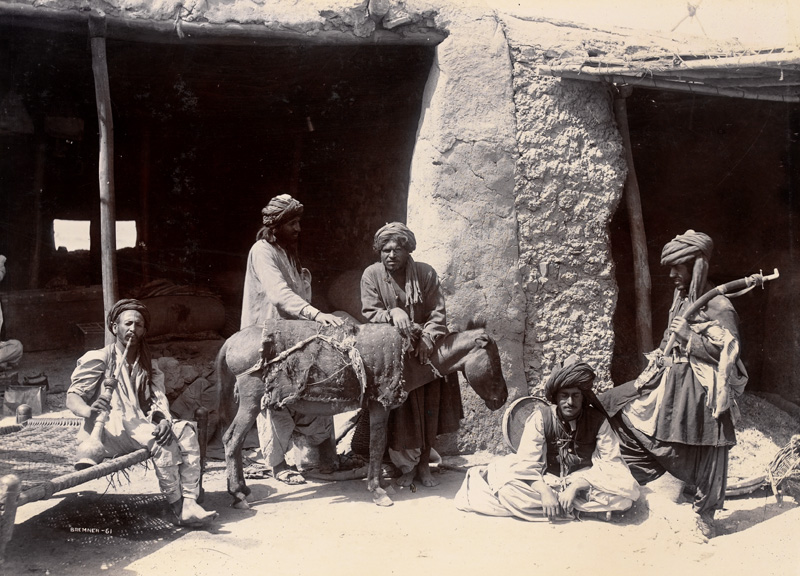
Balochi male shalwar kameez, Quetta.1867

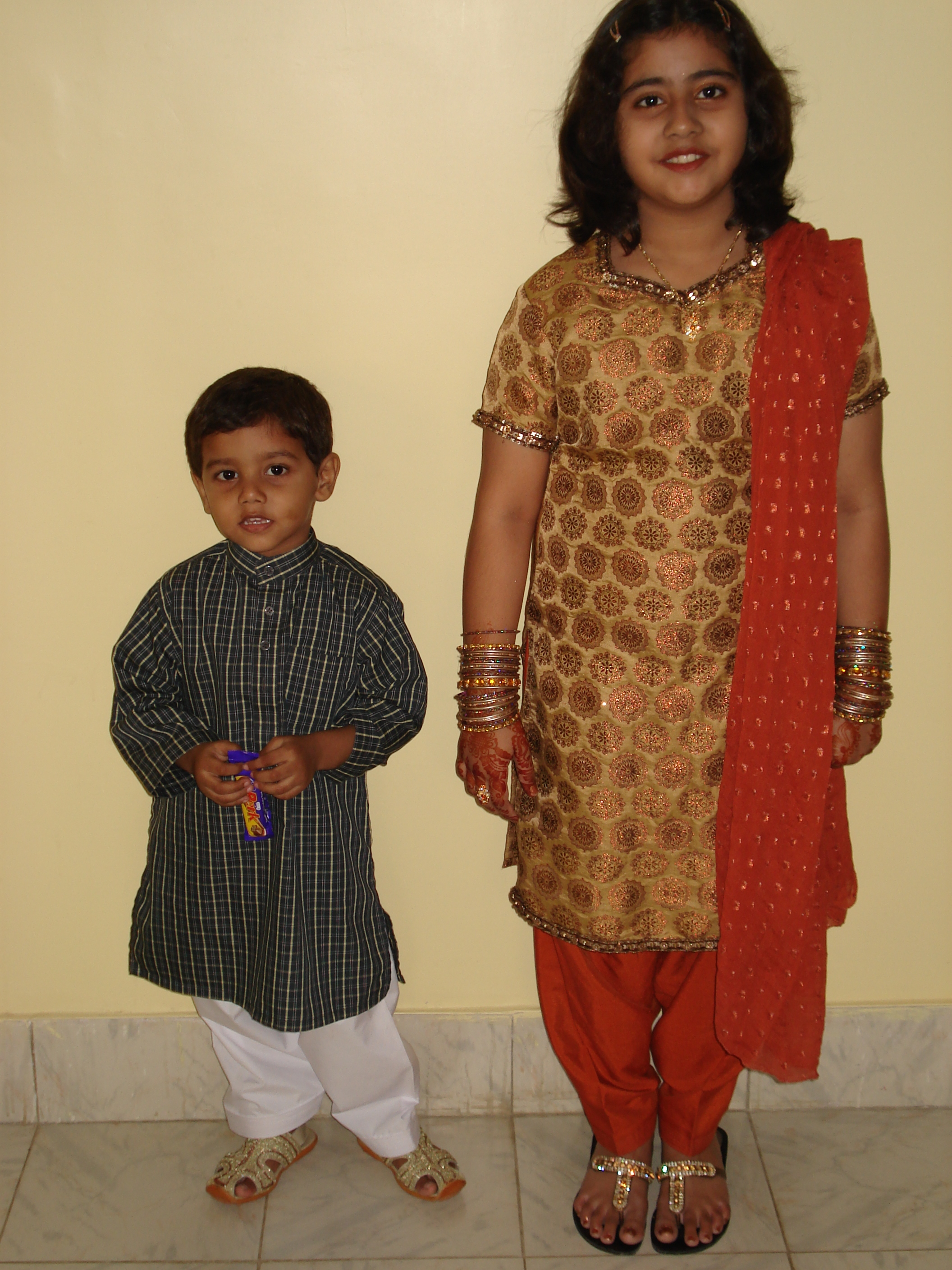
Pakistani dress

== Men's clothing ==
Men wear shalwar kameez, kurta, Pakistani Waistcoat, achkan and sherwani, churidar, or pajama. Other items of clothing include the jama and the angarkha. Headgear includes turbans, the Jinnah Cap, also called karakul, fez, and taqiyah. Kheri and Khussa are popular foot wear. During winter months, and generally across the northern regions of the country, men drape traditional shawls made of Pashmina or other warm materials. In the northern regions of the country, mainly Khyber Pakhtunkhwa and Gilgit-Baltistan, the pakol hat is worn.

While many elements overlap, every province and ethnicity have nuanced approaches to the garments.

=== Regional clothing ===
==== Balochistan ====
In Balochistan, traditionally a long jama (robe) like a smock-frock is worn down to the heels, loose shalwar, a long chadar or scarf, a pagri of cotton cloth, and mostly shoes that narrow at the toe. The material is thick cloth with a very wide shalwar to protect against the hot winds of the dry Sulaiman Range and Kharan Desert.

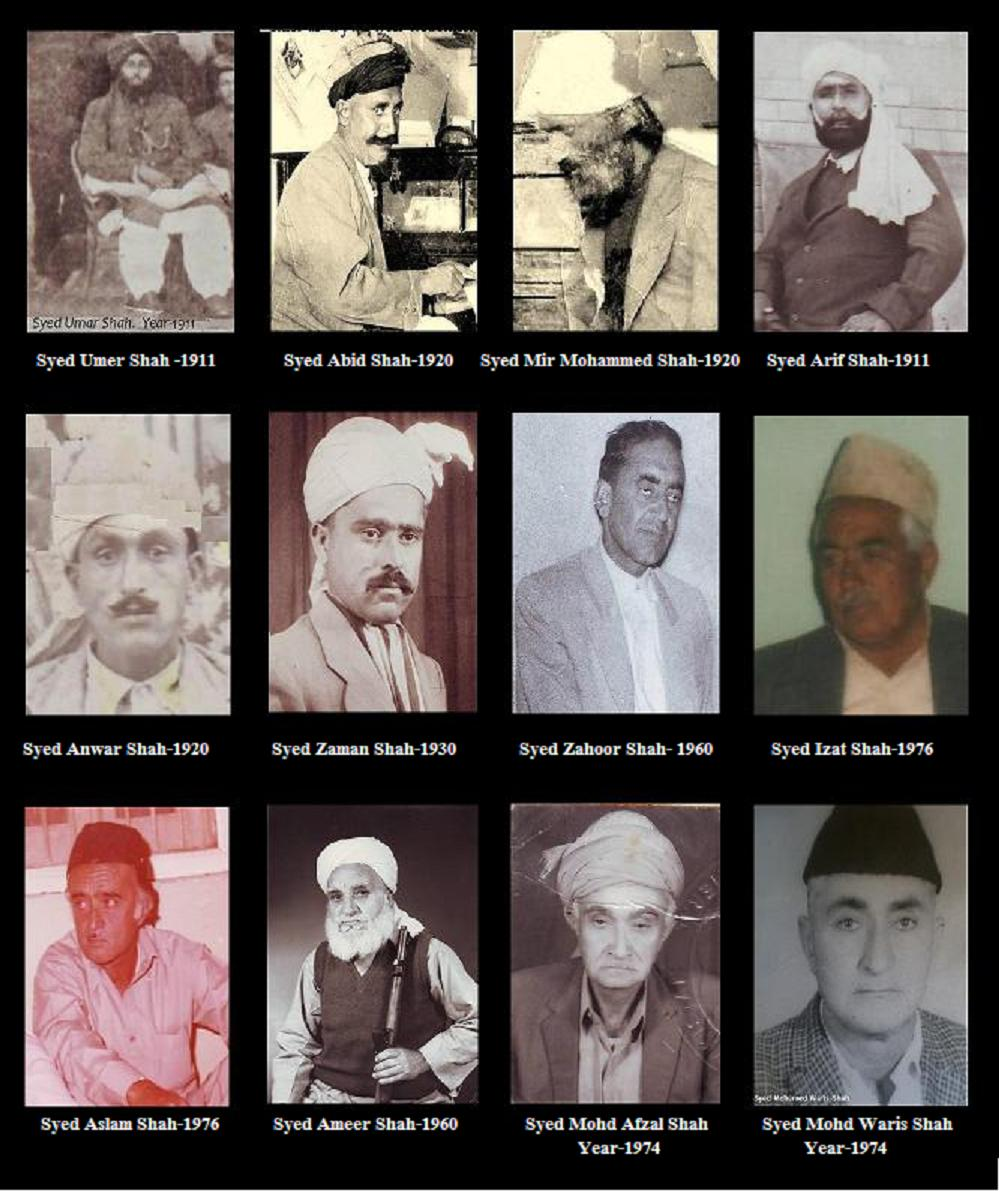
Elders of Kirani Quetta in turbans and hats

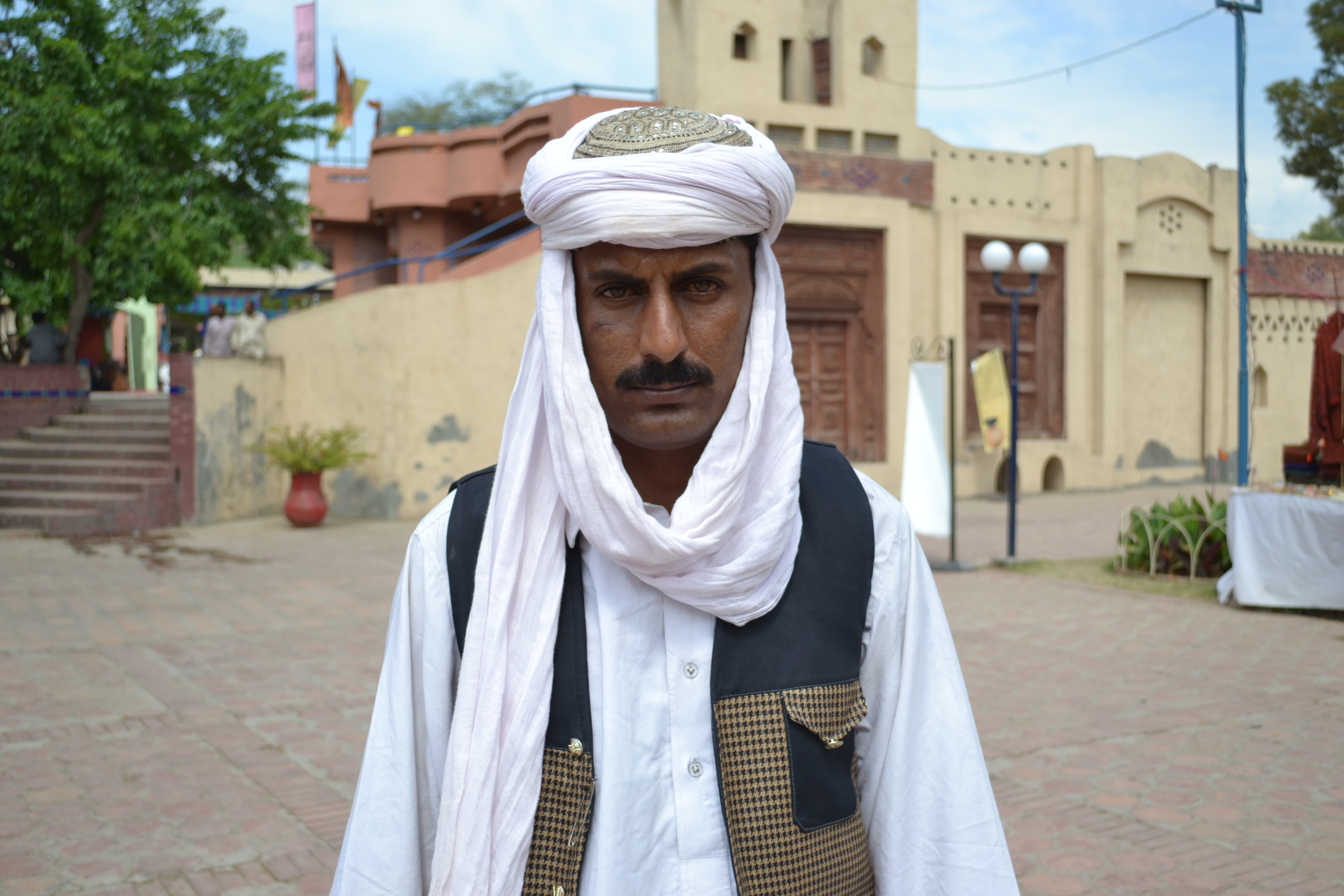
Pakistani Baloch

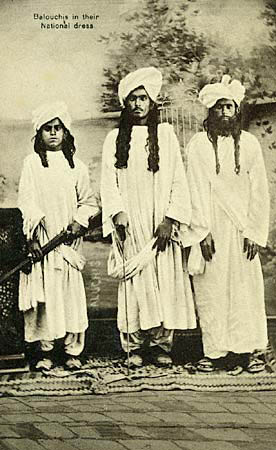
Traditional Balochi suits

==== Sindh ====
Sindhi style salwar khamis are common everyday dress nowadays, Sindhi salwar/suthan is wider at waist and gets narrower below knees till ankles where it is loosely fitted, second style of salwar is Kancha which has very wide (pancha) ankle-cuffs, used to be worn back in time, the third style of shalwar has very less pleats or no pleats at all but is loose like pajamo. Sindhi khamis is usually shorter, before the adoption of khamis, Sindhi men used to wear short angrakho called angelo, later Sindhi pehran/pehriyan (a collarless kurta tunic) tied at one side or in center resembling Sindhi angelo was common, both angelo and pehriyan were sometimes embroidered with Sindhi embroideries and mirrorwork, Sindhi men also wear embroidered vests under the Khamis called ganji, while the different waistcoats (koti, sadri, gidi, kaba) were worn over tunics. Some men in rural areas wear Sindhi lungi (only muslims) called "Godd", whereas hindus wore Dhoti or Treto while others wore tight fitting pajamas and a long jama, the rich men wore sherwanis with gold buttons. With clothes Sindhi men wear Sindhi patko, pagg or phento (turbans), youngsters wear Sindhi cap, and men carry Ajrak or any other locally made shawls/handkerchief on shoulders.

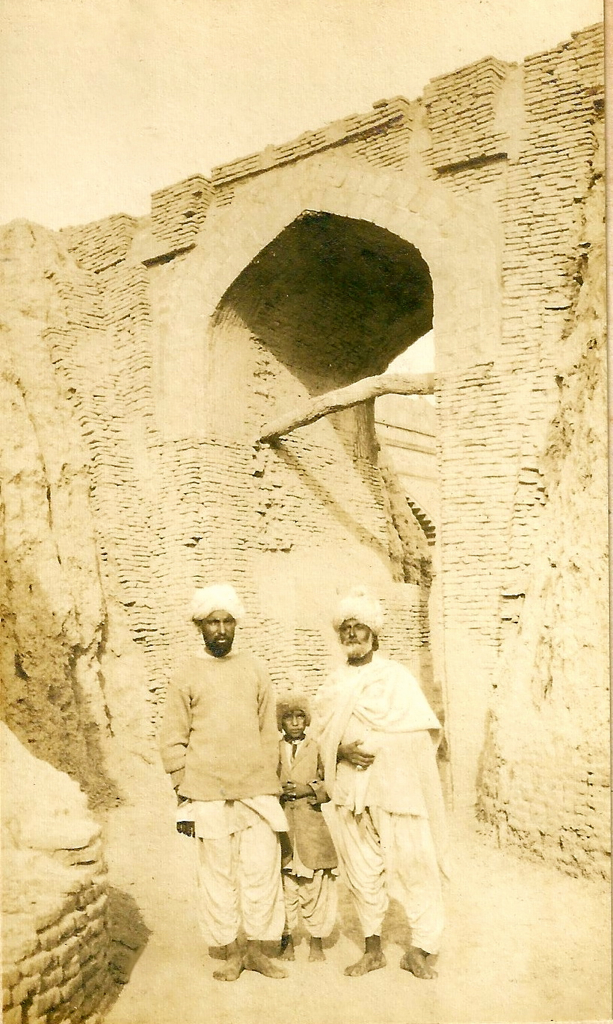
Two Sindhi muslim men in Sindhi Salwar/Suthan and Pehriyan with Sindhi Patko (turban) and Loi (winter shawls)

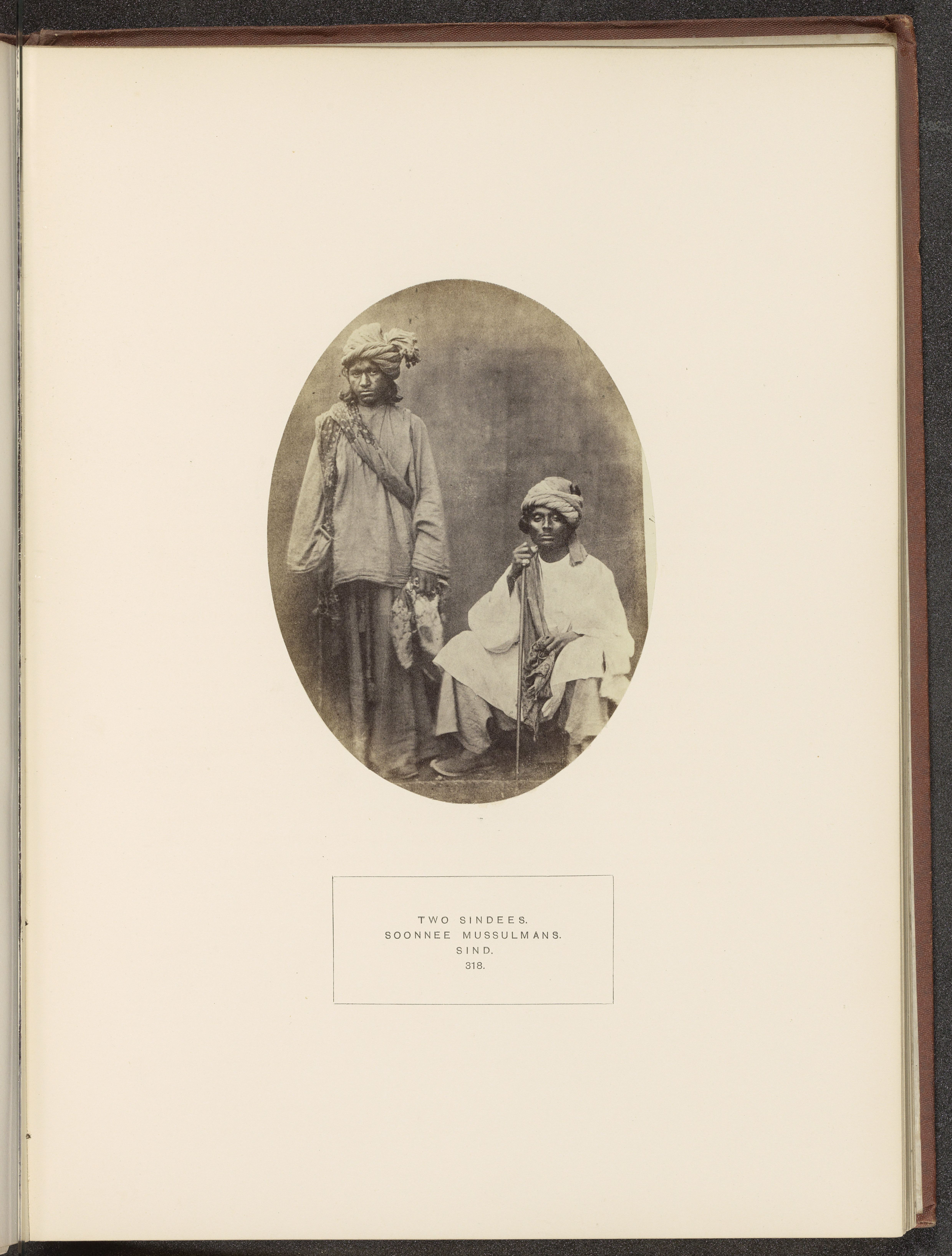
Two Sindhi men in Sindhi Kancha, Patko and Ajrak.

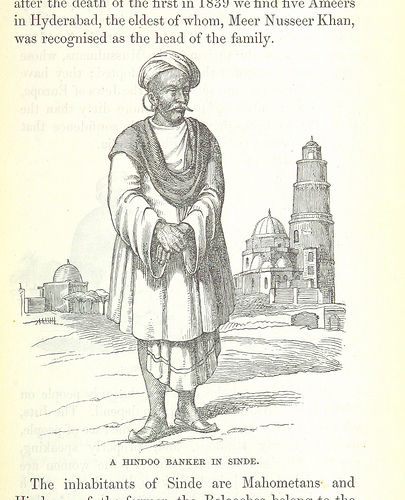
A Sindhi hindu banker in long Jama and Dhoti.

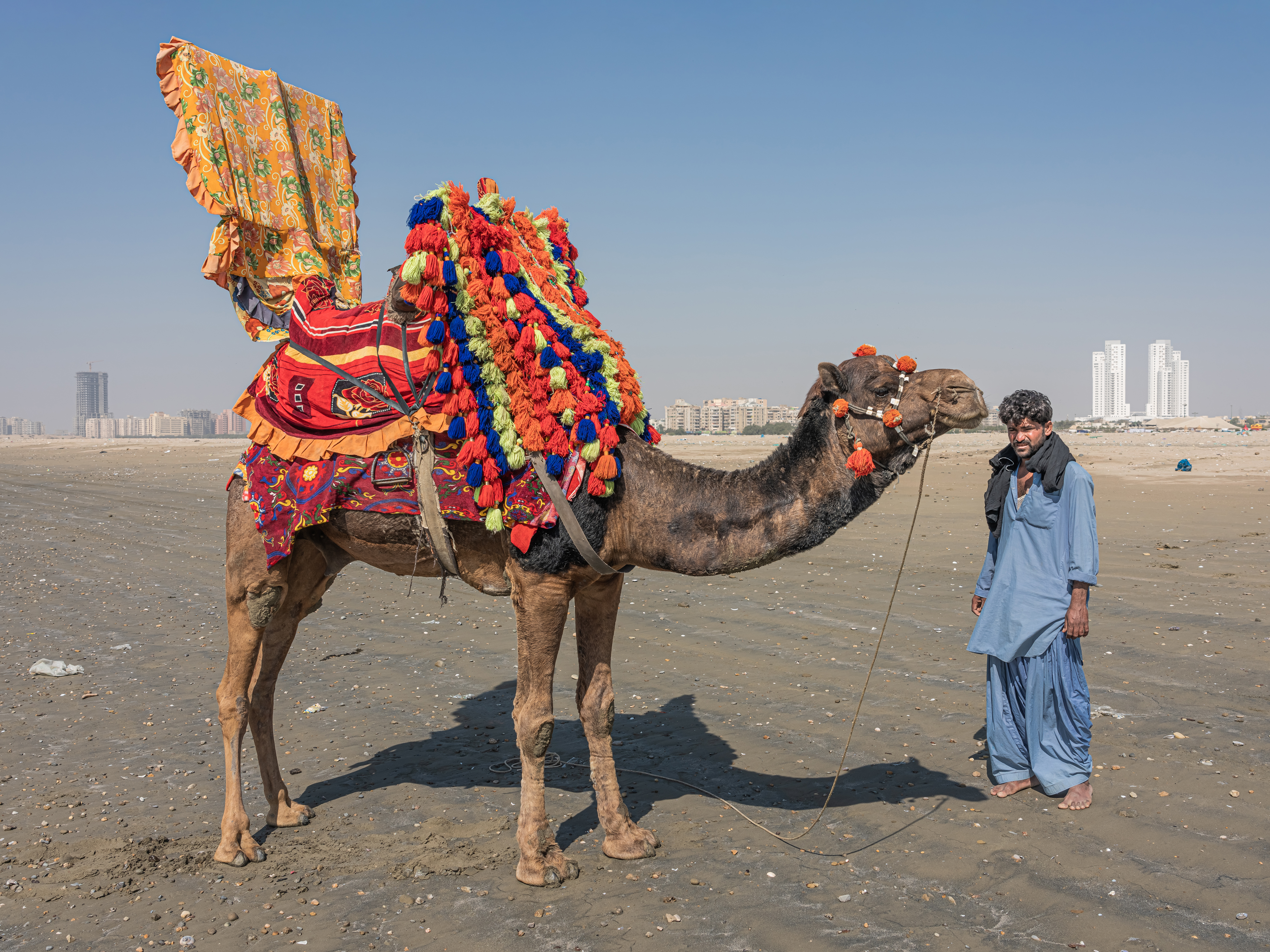
Sindhi man in modern style Sindhi Khamis and Kancha in Karachi.

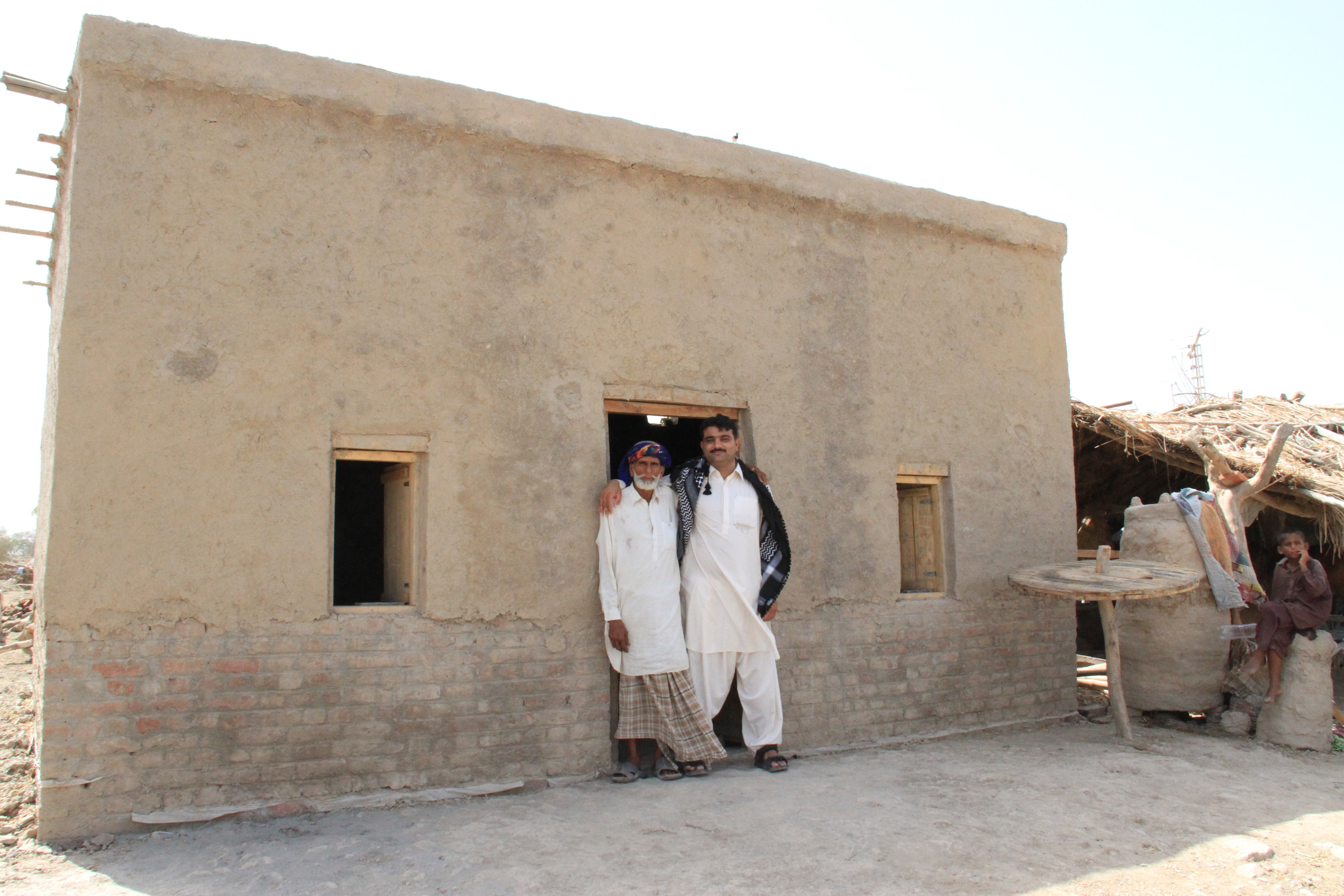
Two Sindhi muslim men wearing Sindhi Salwar Khamis and Godd with Sindhi rumals (handkerchiefs)

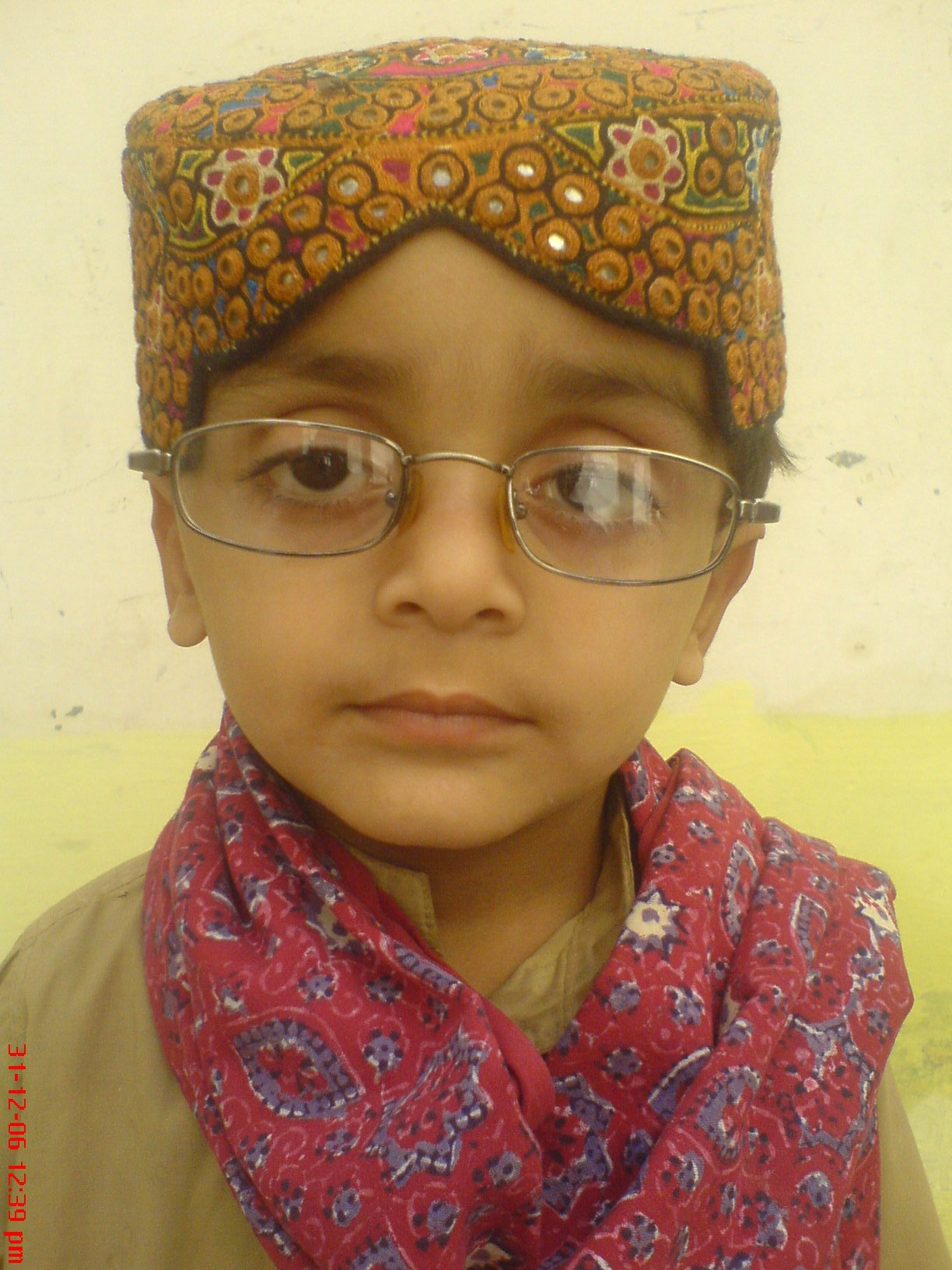
Sindhi ajrak and Sindhi topi.

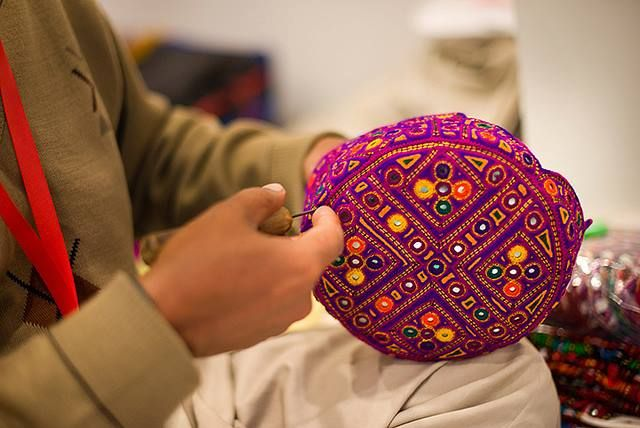
Sindhi topi (cap)

==== Punjab ====
Punjabi men wear the straight cut Punjabi shalwar kameez, kurta, or shalwar. Dhoti, lungi, or tehmat are often worn in rural areas. Other Punjabi shalwar styles include the Pothohari shalwar, Multani shalwar, Dhoti shalwar, and the Bahawalpuri shalwar which is very wide and baggy with many folds. Turban of a thin cloth is also worn especially in rural areas of Punjab where it is called pagri. Footwear include the khussa and kheri, which are widely worn.

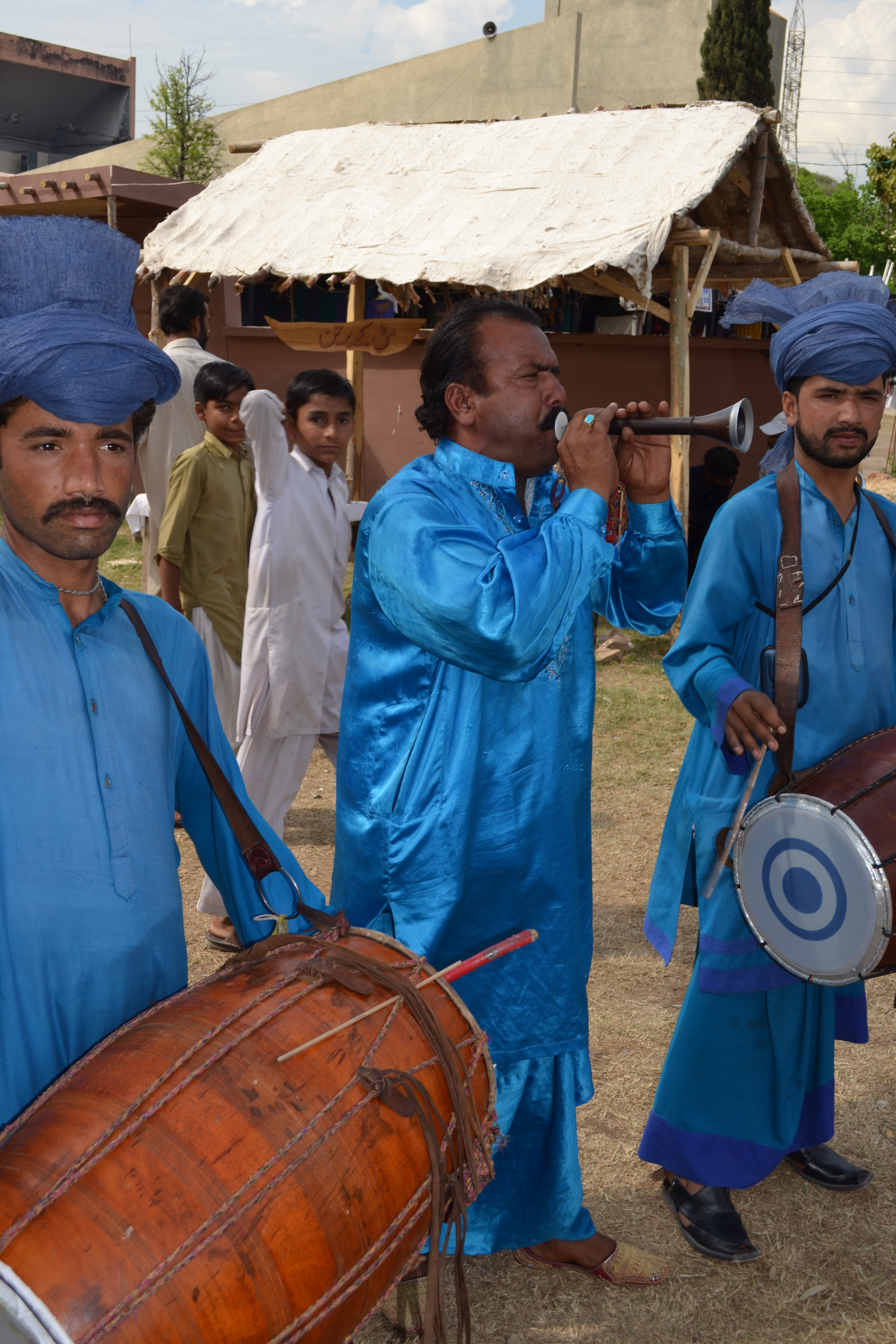
Punjabi kurta and tehmat

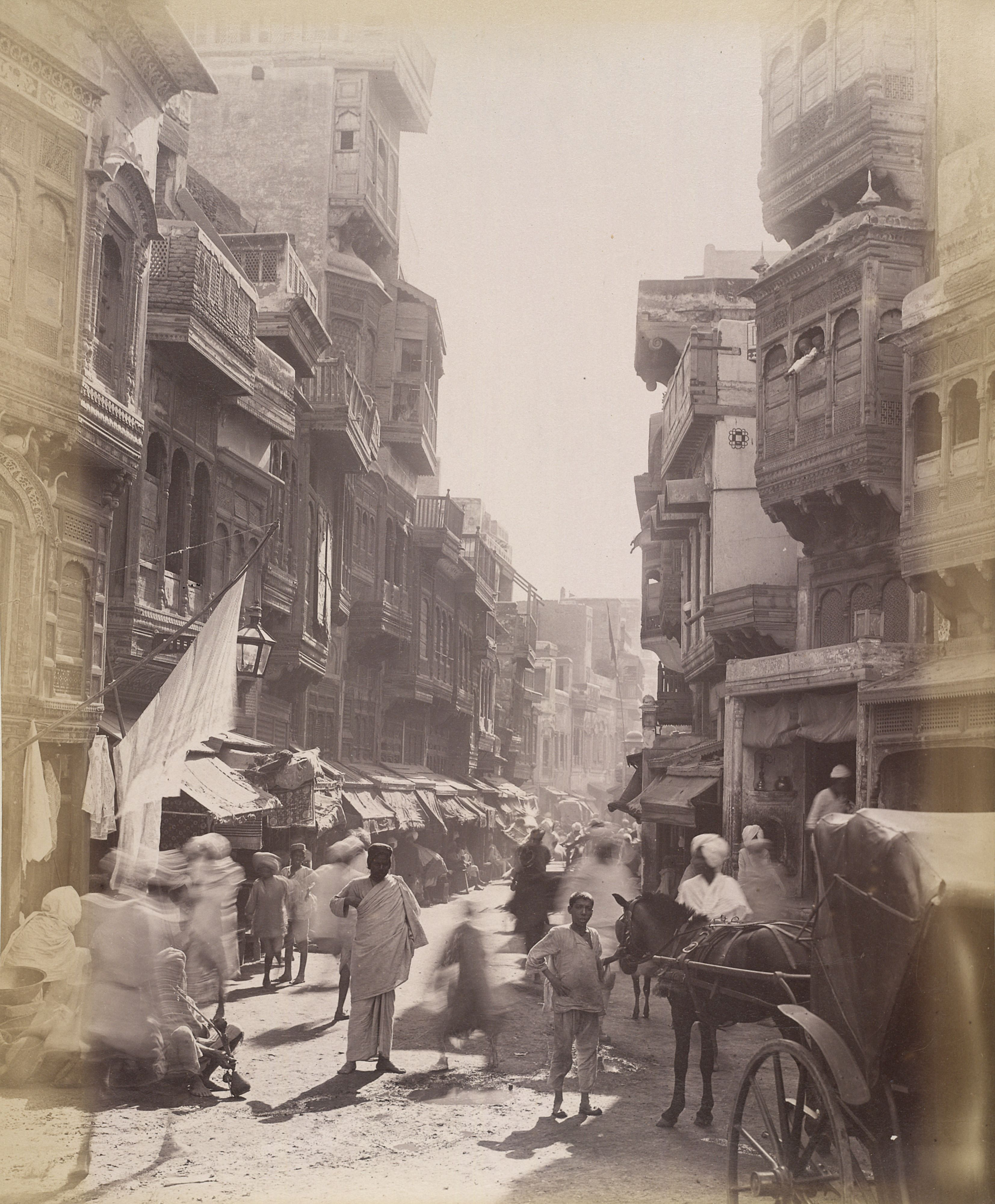
Punjabi clothing of Lahore, 1890s

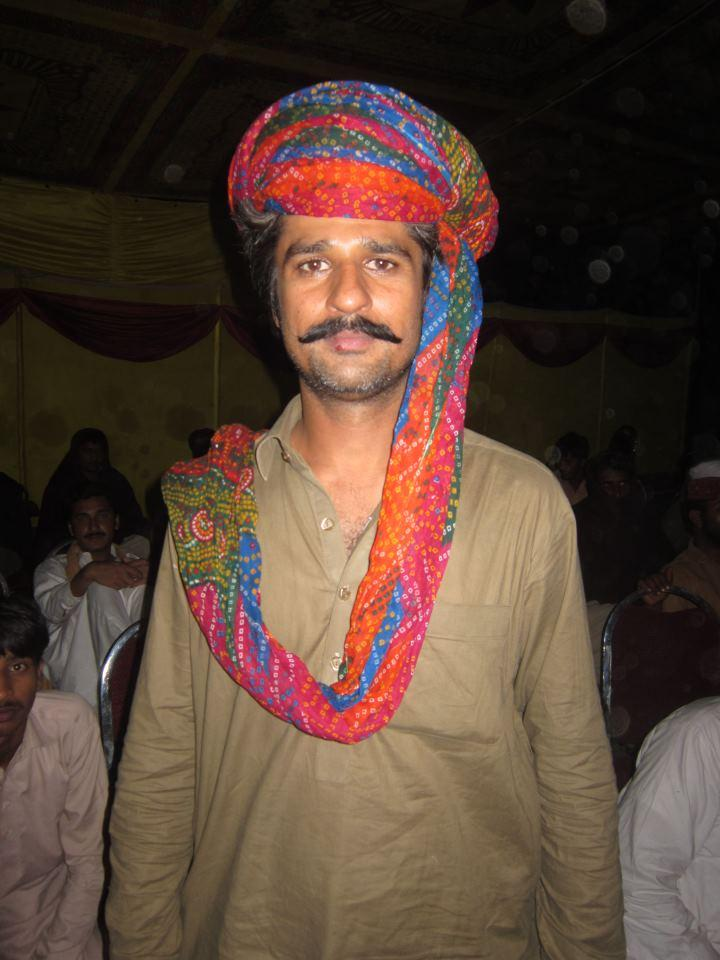
Saraiki Turban

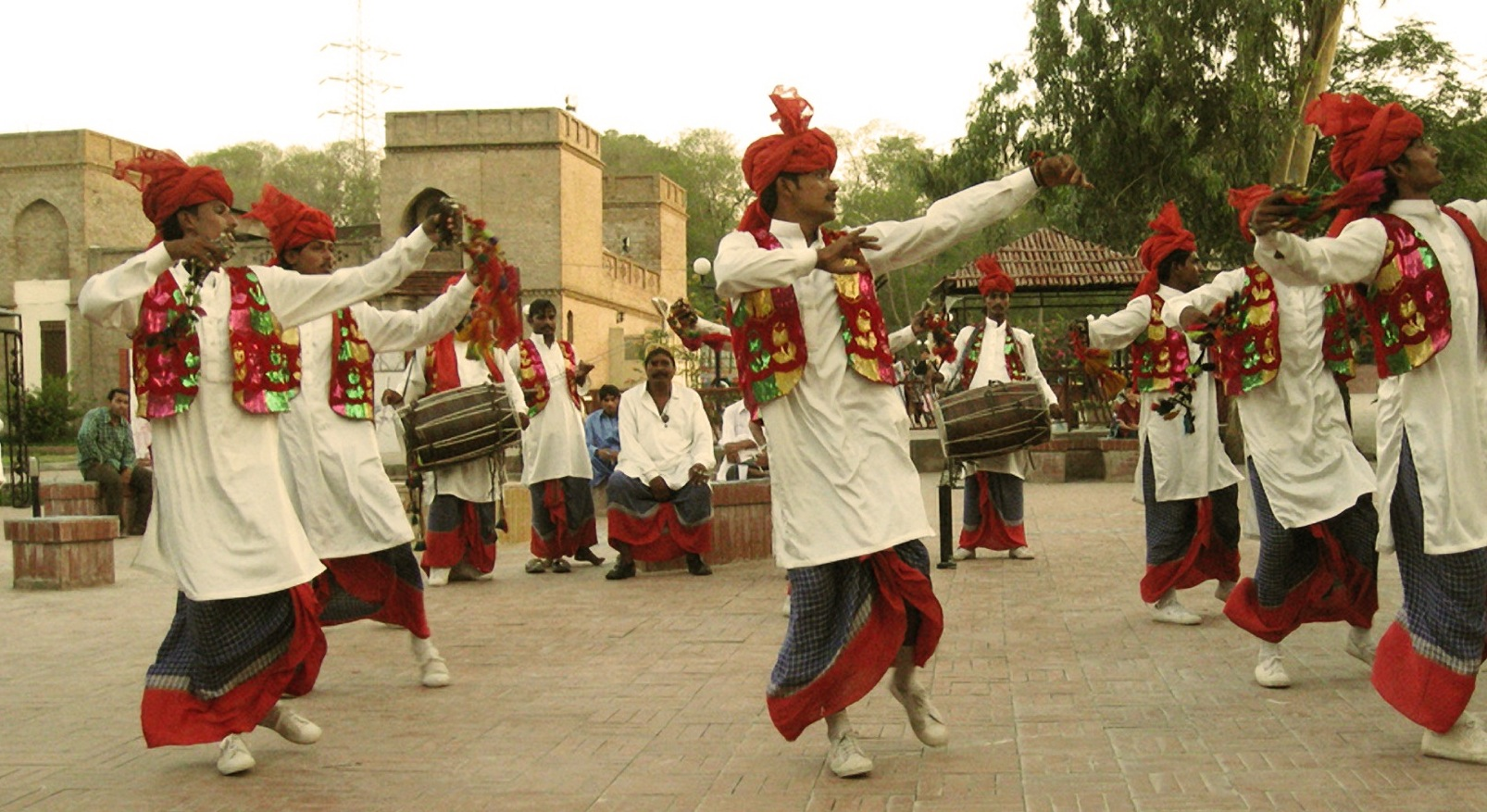
Bhangra Dance performers in Punjab wearing Kurta and Tehmat.

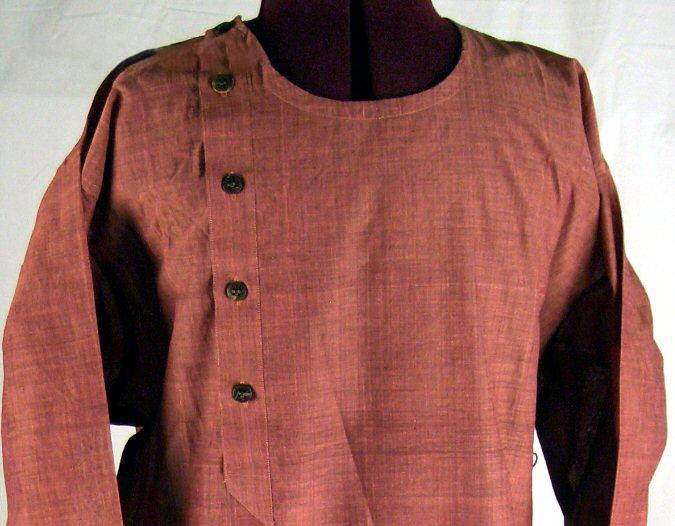
Saraiki Kurta

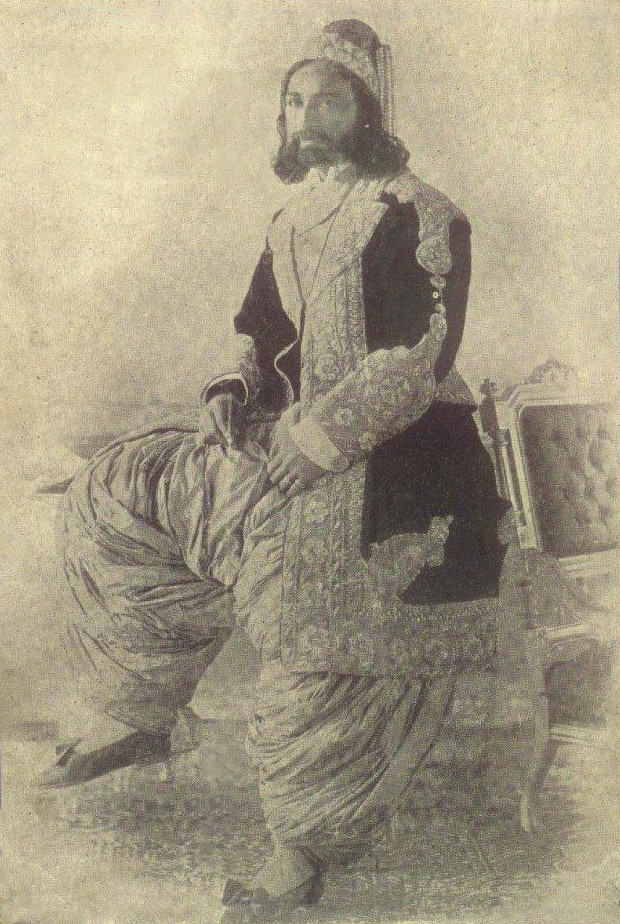
Prince Suba Sadiq Abbasi, Bahawalpur in Bahawalpuri shalwar

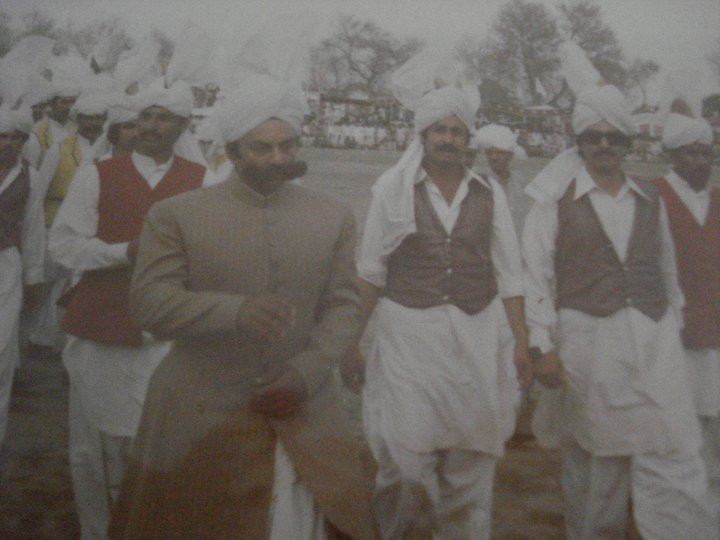
Men in Attock in shalwar kameez

==== Khyber Pakhtunkhwa ====
Pashtun dress differ according to region but usually people wear traditional Peshawari chappal as footwear and a Pakol or turban as headwear. The traditional male Pashtun dress includes the Khet partug, Peshawari shalwar, and the Patke tunban. Males usually wear kufi, Peshawari turban, or pakol as traditional headgear.

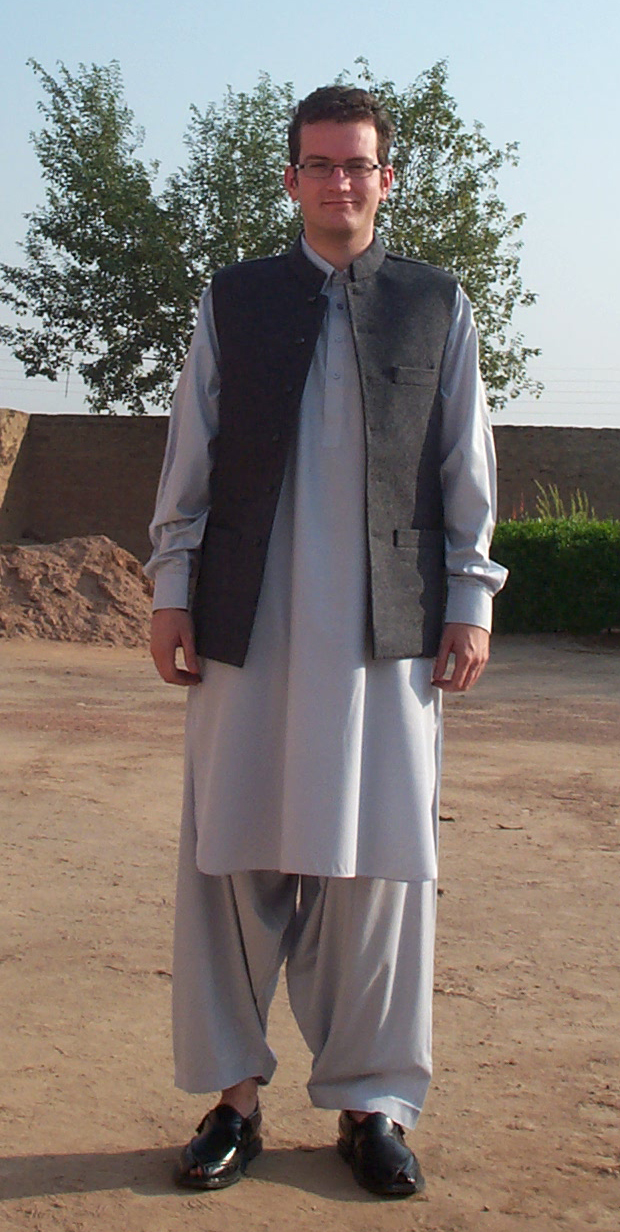
Clothing worn by most Pashtun males in Afghanistan and Pakistan

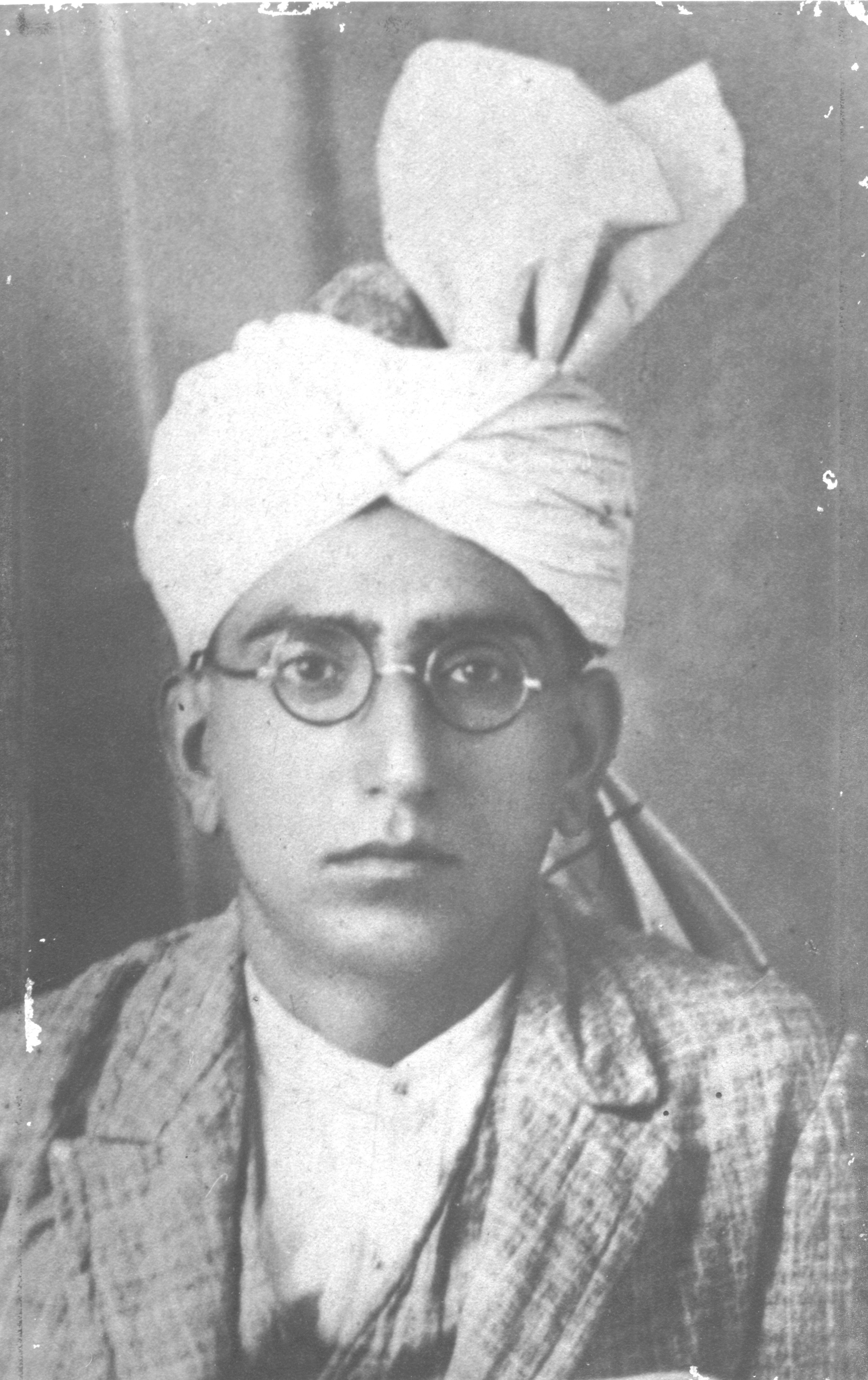
Amir Chand Bombwal, Peshawar editor wearing a Peshawari Turban

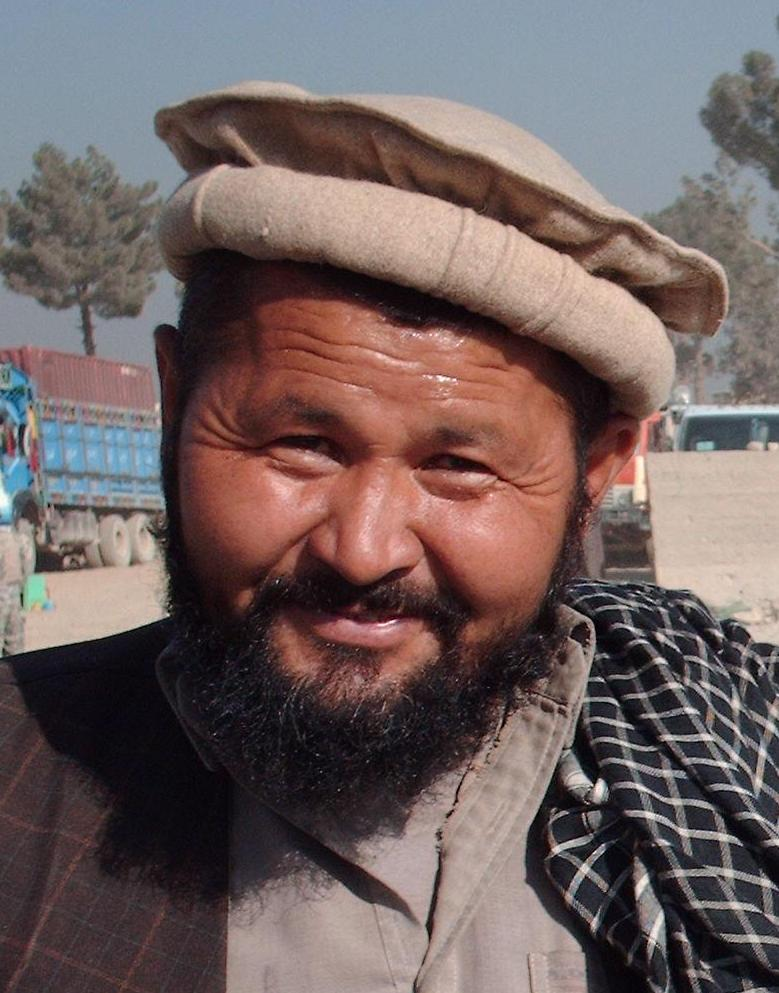
Man wearing pakol

==== Gilgit-Baltistan ====
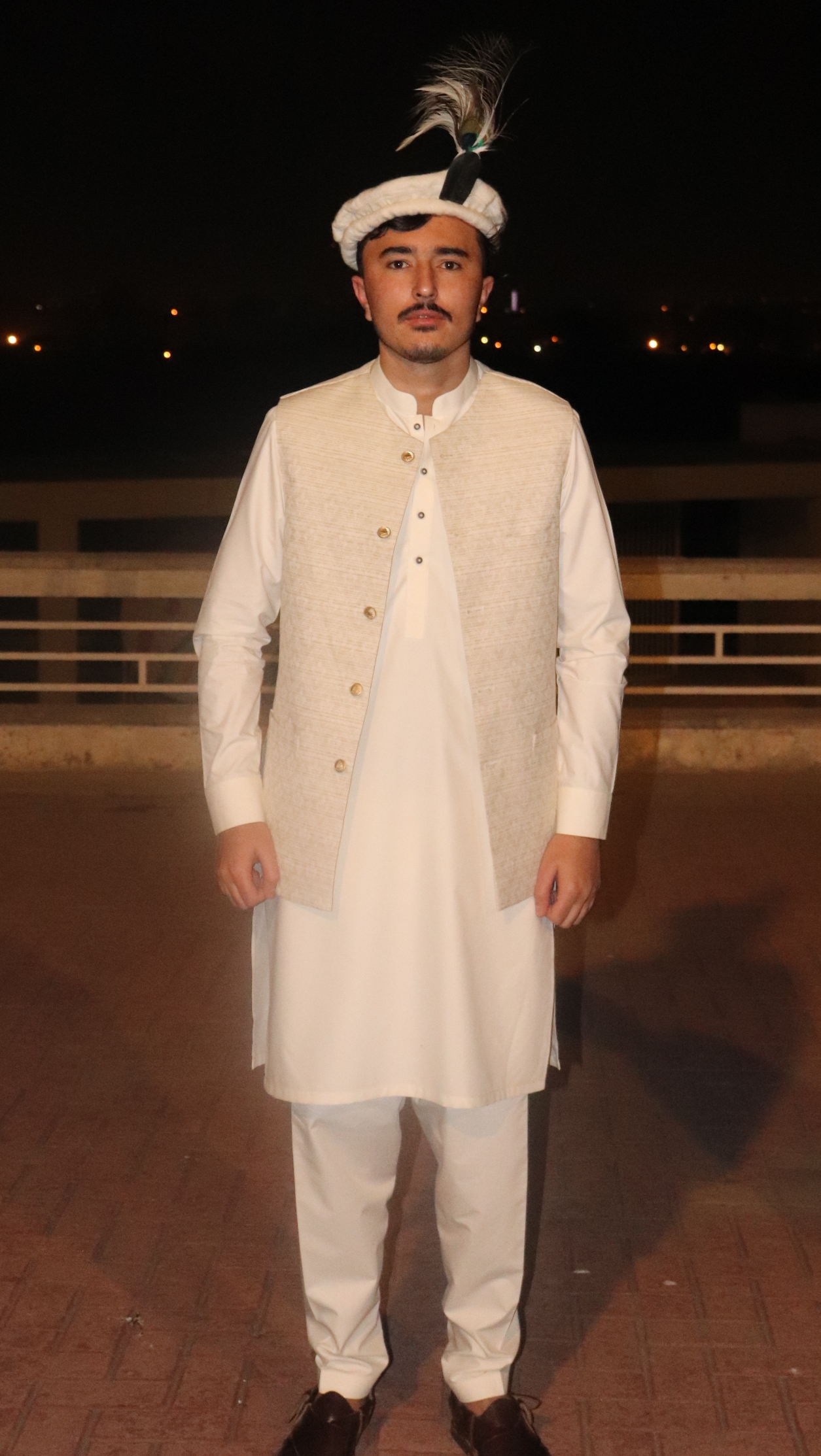
A Gilgiti man wearing the khoi cap

The traditional caps of Gilgit-Baltistan include pakol and iraghi (also known as khoi).

==== Azad Kashmir ====
The clothing of Azad Kashmir includes various styles of the shalwar kameez. It is called pheran.

== Women's clothing ==
=== Shalwar kameez ===
Pakistani women wear the shalwar kameez which is worn in different styles, colours, and designs which can be decorated with different styles and designs of embroidery. The kameez can be of varying sleeve length, shirt length, and necklines. The drawers can be the straight-cut shalwar, patiala salwar, churidar, cigarette pajama, tulip trouser, samosa pajama, or simple trouser

=== Dupatta ===
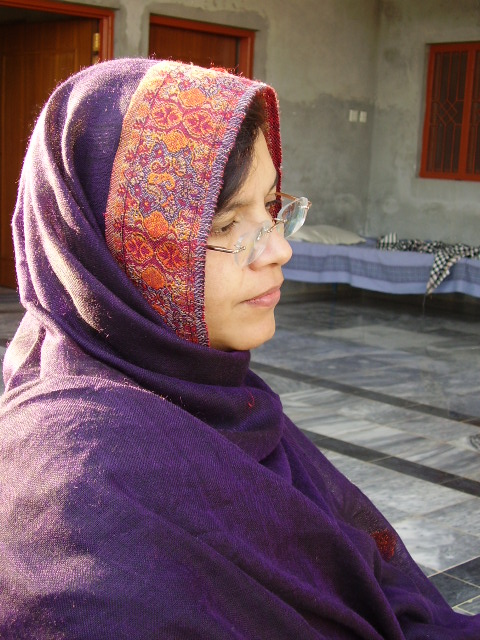
A Pakistani woman wearing a dupatta

The dupatta is treated just as an accessory in current urban fashion. Most women who carry it nowadays wear it just as a decorative accessory; it's usually worn wrapped around the neck or hanging down the shoulder. Dupatta is also used by some women when entering a mosque, dargah, where they cover their head with a dupatta while entering such places. It is widely worn by women in weddings and other parties out of choice and fashion. On such occasions, mostly it is wrapped around the waist, neck, or just draped on a shoulder. It is used with different embroidery designs of kamdani and gota.

=== Burqa ===
In Pakistan, upper and middle-class women in towns wear burqas over their normal clothes in public. The burqa is the most visible dress in Pakistan. It is a garment worn over the ordinary clothes and is made of white cotton. Many upper-class women wear a two-piece burqa which is usually black in colour but sometimes navy blue or dark red. It consists of a long cloak and a separate headpiece with a drop-down face veil. Some educated urban women no longer wear the burqa, while some of them wear hijab as an alternative. The burqa is also not worn by rural peasant women who work in the fields. In rural areas only elite women wear burqas. Purdah is still common in the rural elite and urban middle class, but not among rural farmers.

=== Bridal dresses ===
Pakistani brides traditionally opt for lehengas, anarkalis, saris or shararas and ghararas. Most wear lehengas, popularly either with short lehenga cholis or a longer shalwar top. Lehengas are long skirts usually paired with a short blouse known as a choli, but can be paired with a long shalwar kameez. Saris are also sometimes worn for wedding ceremonies, opting for an elegant, different and regal look. Anarkalis are also an option, imitating gowns. Shararas consist of a blouse or shalwar, with loose pants. Ghararas, are similar, except the pants are tight at the thighs and flare from the knee. All these options are normally intricately embroidered, and are moderately popular with Indian brides too.

=== Other traditional dresses ===
On special occasions such as Eid more heavily embroidered iterations of the shalwar kameez or the sari are worn by Pakistani women.

Farshi Pajama is an old traditional dress which is worn occasionally. Laacha is worn in Punjab, the lower part of which resembles the dhoti.

=== Regional clothing ===
==== Balochistan ====
The typical dress of a Baloch woman consists of a long frock and shalwar with a headscarf. Balochi women wear heavy embroidered shalwar kameez and dupatta with the embroidery utilising Shisha work. The Balochi Duch from Makran District is one of the many forms of Balochi dresses and is famous all across Balochistan. Since it is purely hand embroidered, Balochi Duch is expensive and it takes months to complete a single Balochi suit.

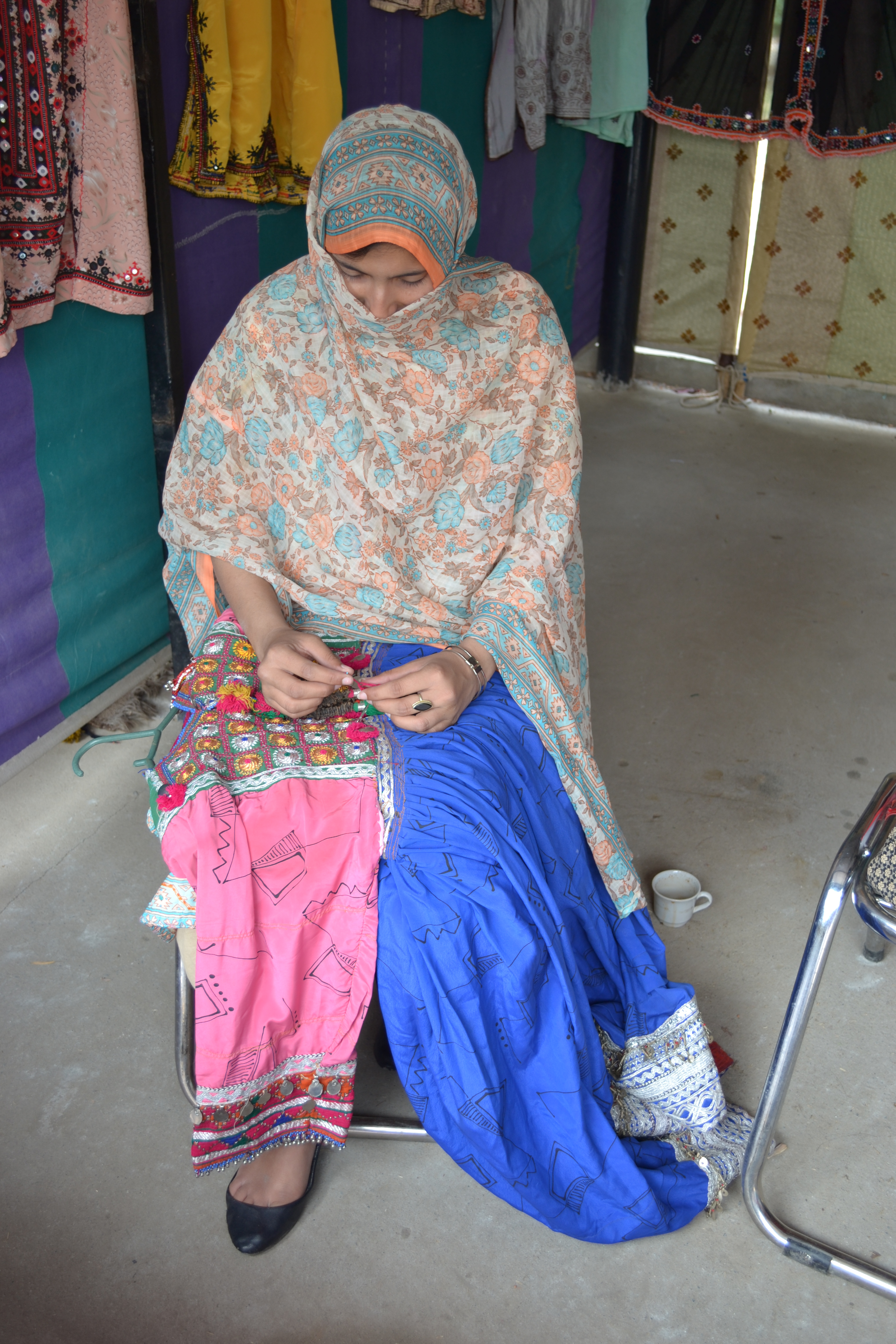
Pakistani Baloch Lady

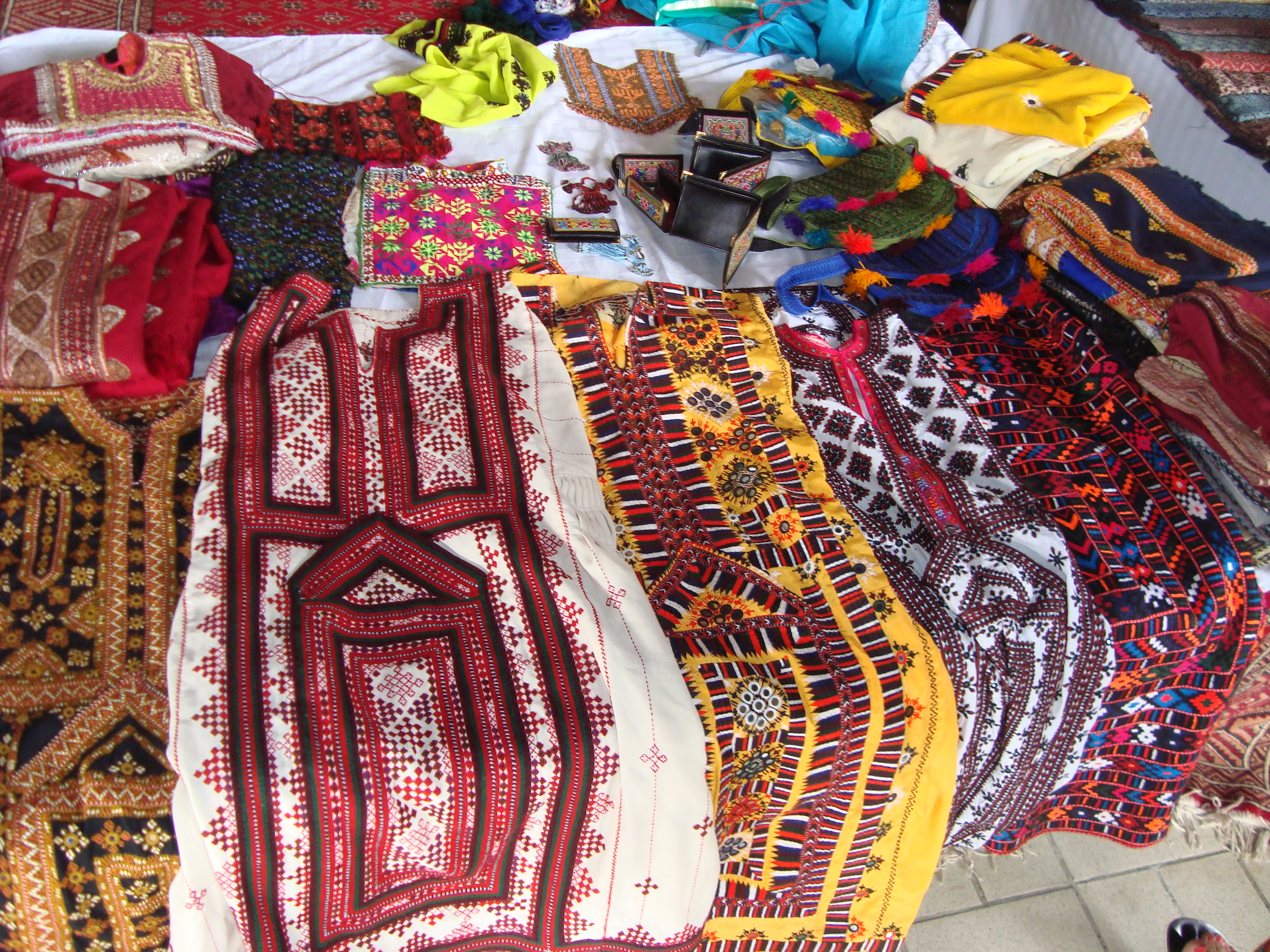
Traditional Balochi dresses

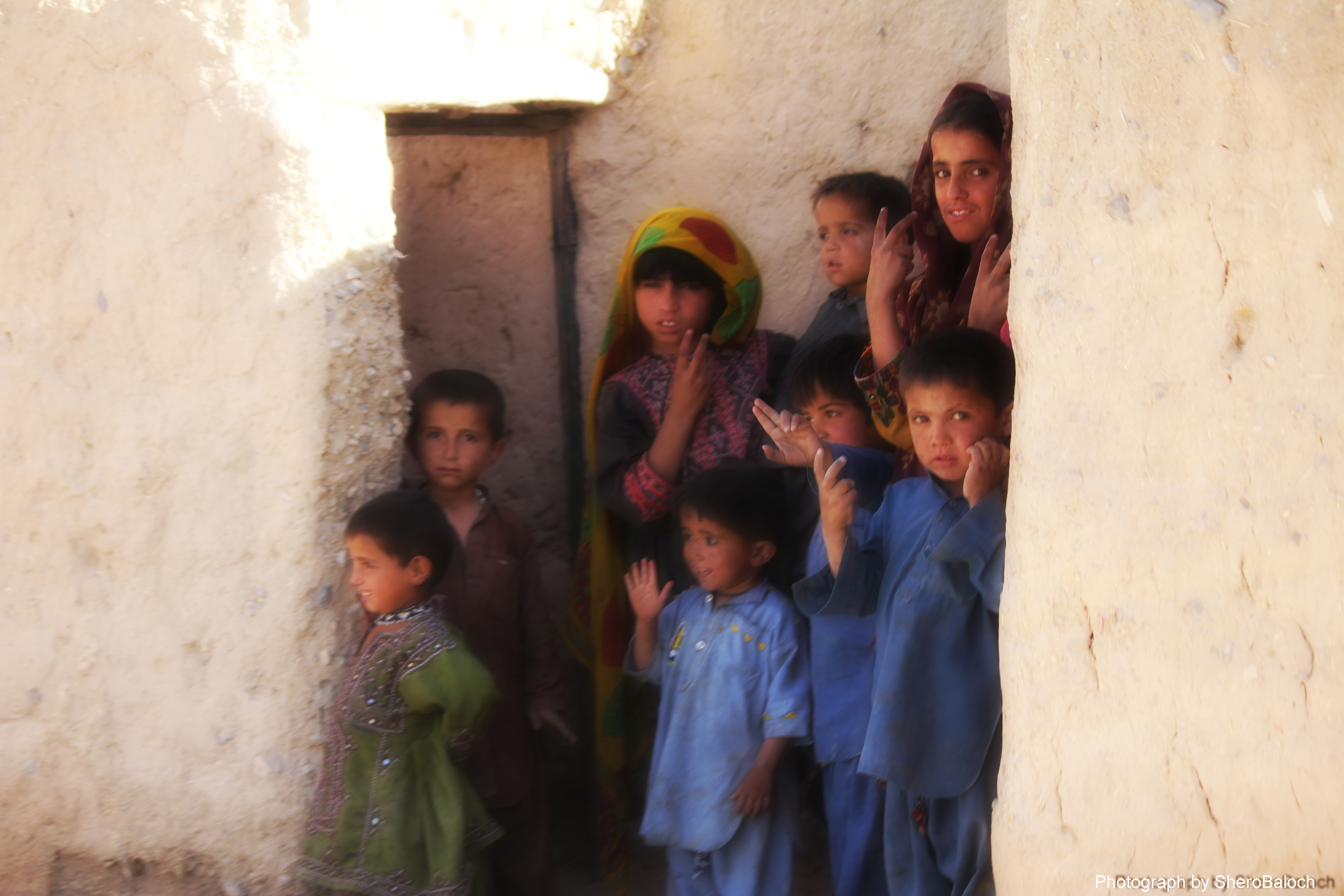
Children in Quetta wearing local embroidery designs

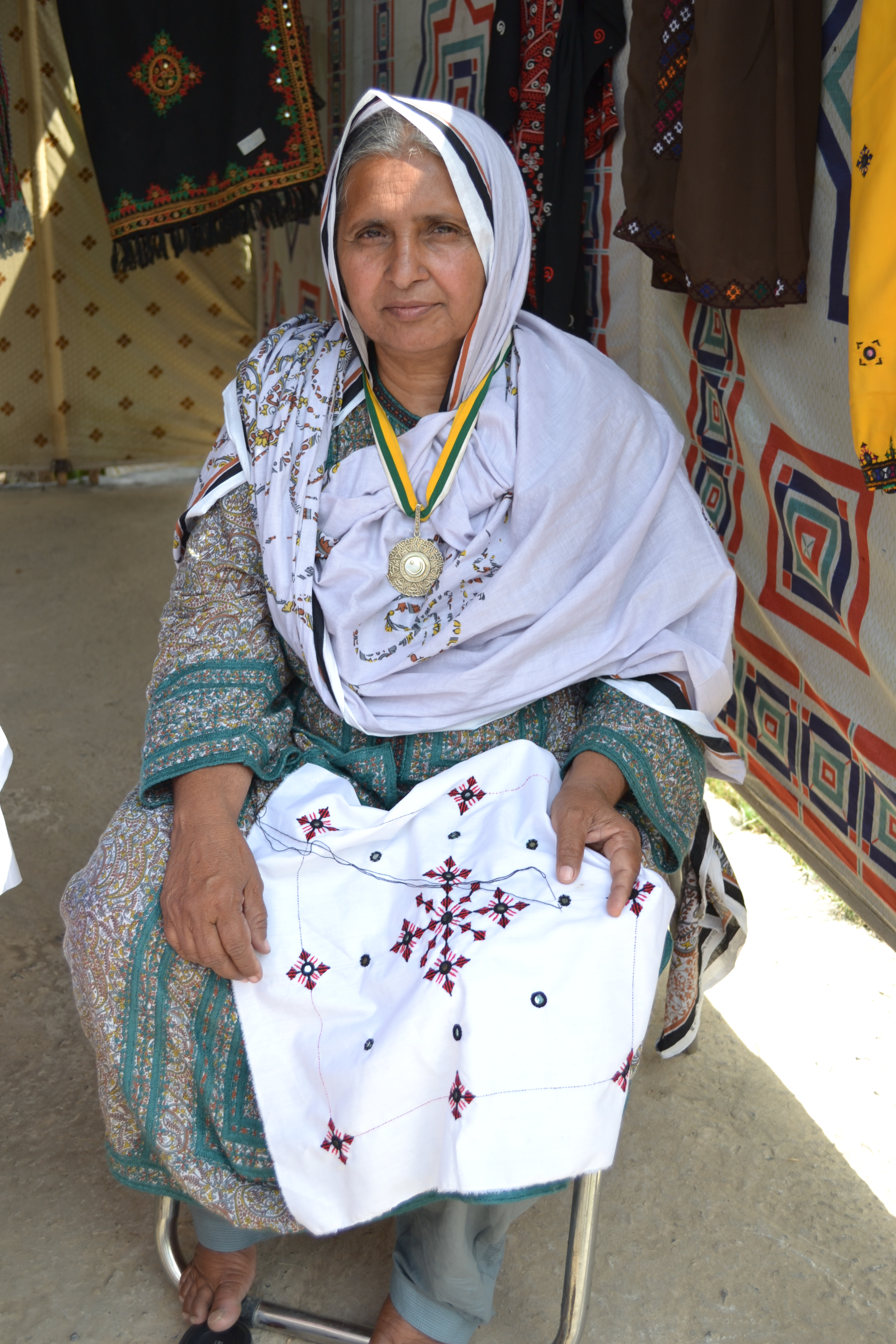
Malookan, Pakistani Baloch embroidery artist

==== Sindh ====
Sindhi women just like Sindhi men commonly wear Sindhi Salwar with wide and long Cholo (tunic) nowadays, with Sindhi embroideries and mirrorwork, along with large Sindhi veil (Rao, Gandhi, Poti), back In time the traditional dresses of Sindhi women varied from region to region, from tribe to tribe as much as that the clothes become mark of identification of one's tribe, but most common code of dresses were Sindhi Cholo/Choli of various styles and embroidered (Gaj/Aggoti), trousers salwars/suthan or pajamo was usually made of Soossi, silk or satin fabric and over salwars a wide Bandhani (tie and dye) cloth Paro/Ghaghro/Pashgeer/Jablo (skirt), or of Satin or Sossi fabric skirt. while some Sindhi women wore long thobe like dresses called Jubo in Sindhi, and other Sindhi women wore frocks called (Ghagho, Abho or Fairak) in Sindhi.

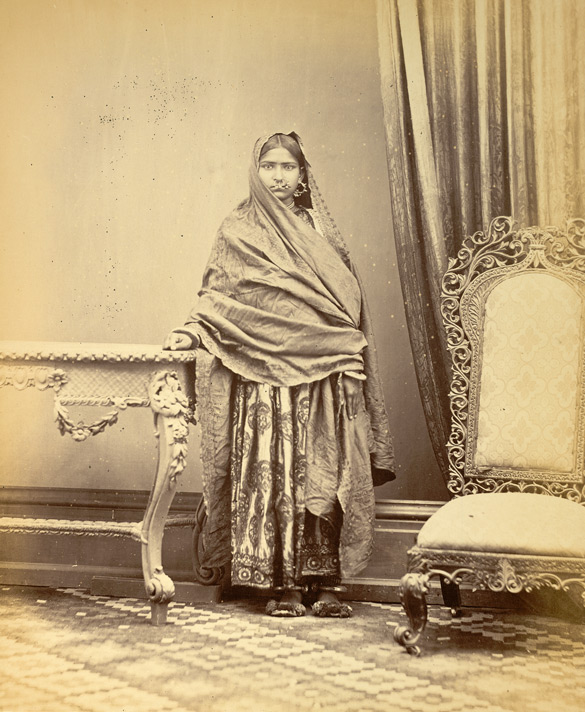
Portrait of a girl from Sindh wearing Sindhi Choli (tunic), Sossi Shalwars under Satin Paro (skirt) with long wide veil, and traditional Sindhi "Tauran wari Jutti"(1870s).

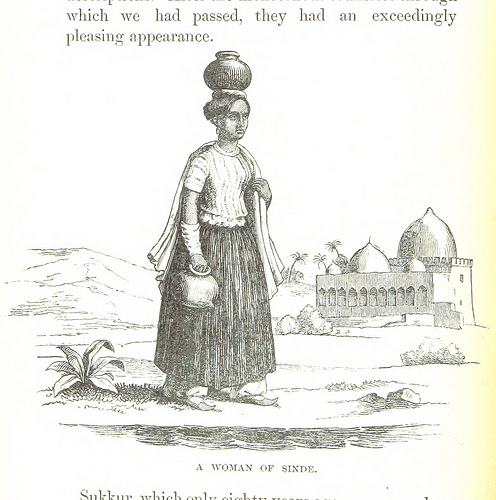
Sindhi Lehenga, Choli, and Sindhi traditional pantaloon shalwar

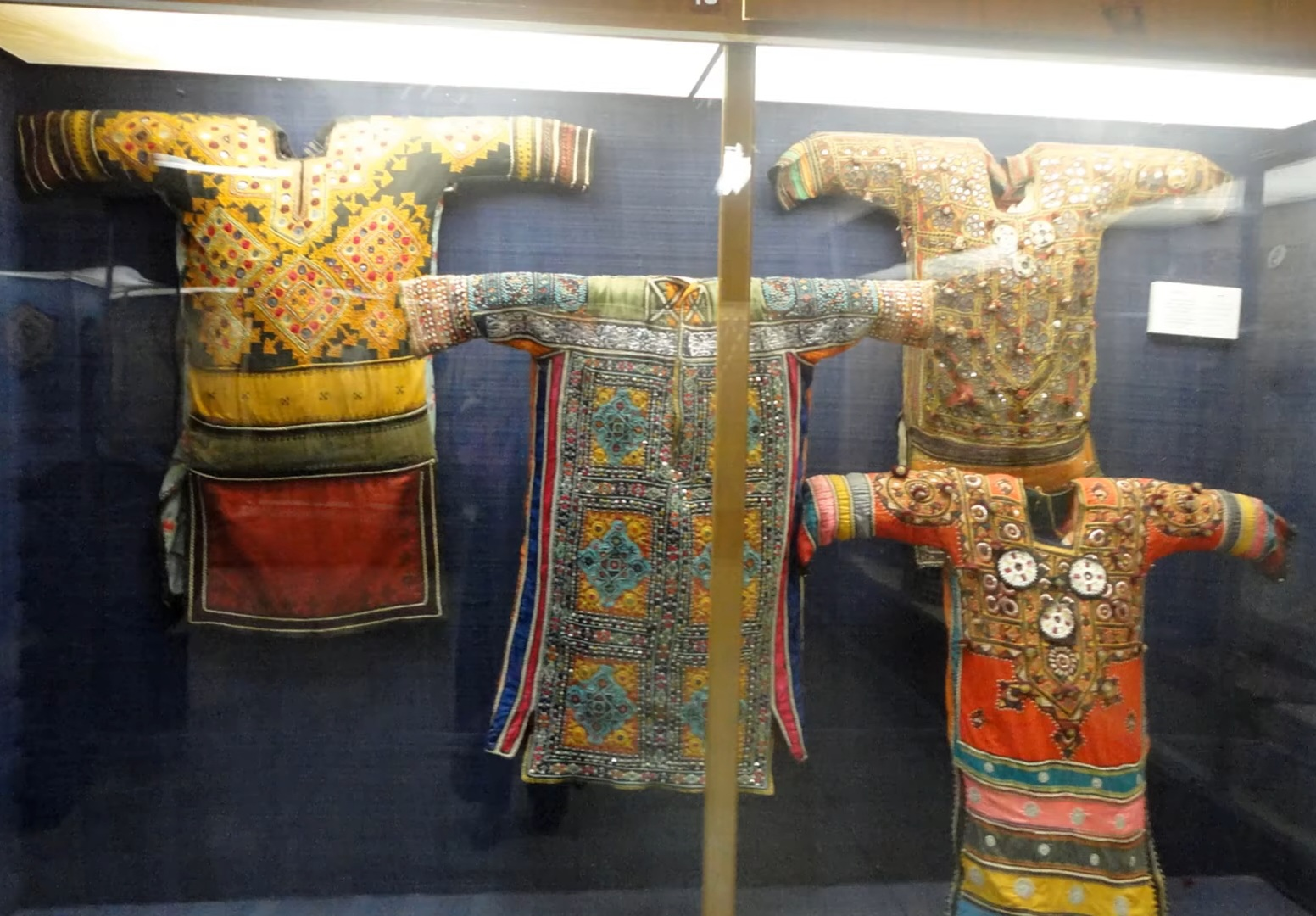
Sindhi Cholo (tunic) with Gaj fronts worn by many Sammat Muslim women in Lar, Kohistan and Thar region of Sindh.

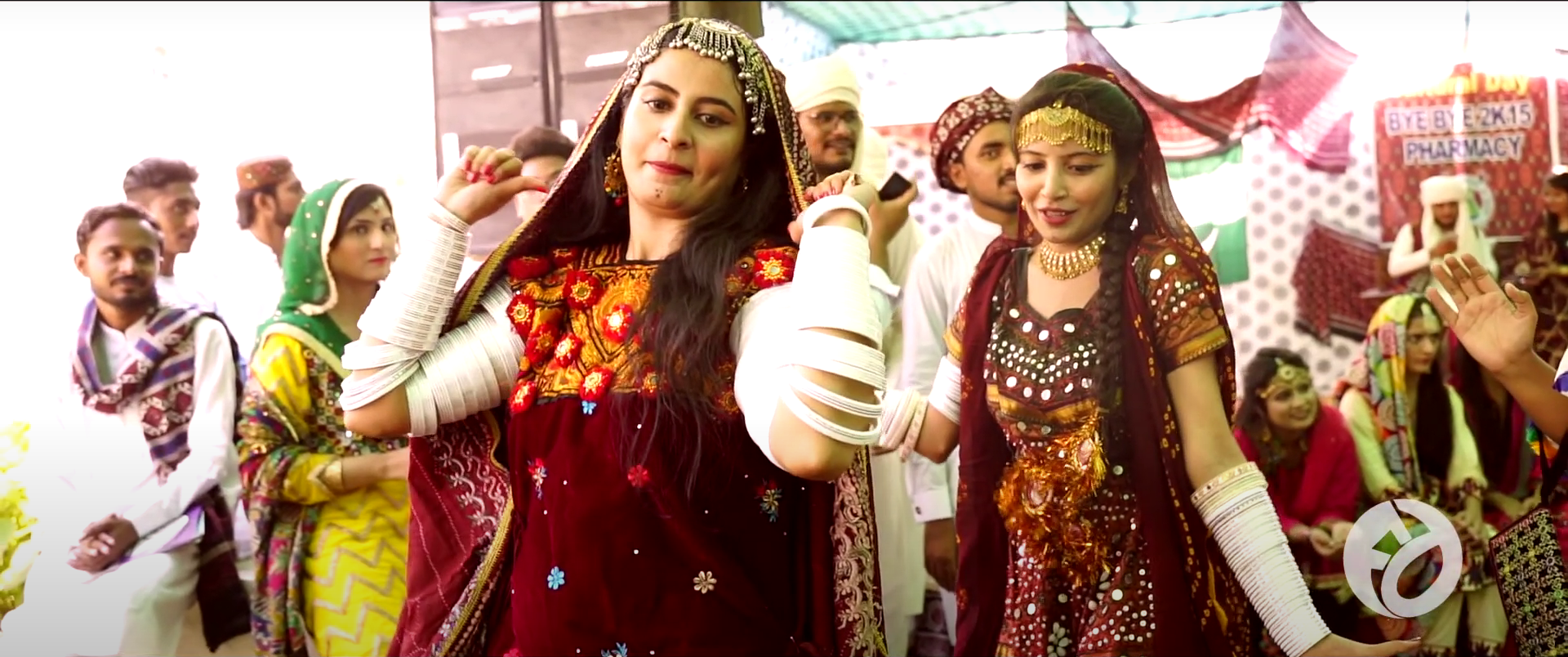
Sindhi girls dressed in Sindhi clothes

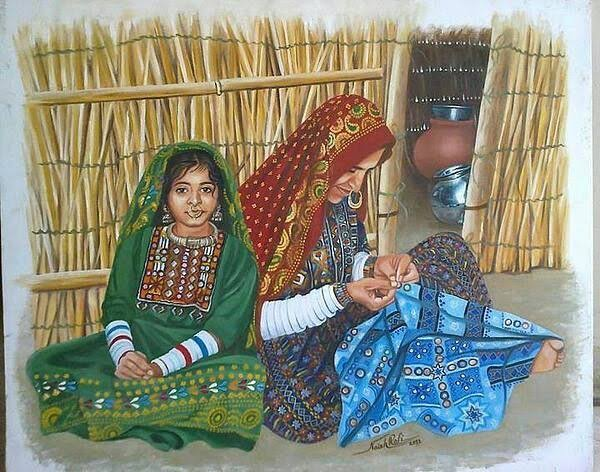
Sindhi Jubo (thobes).

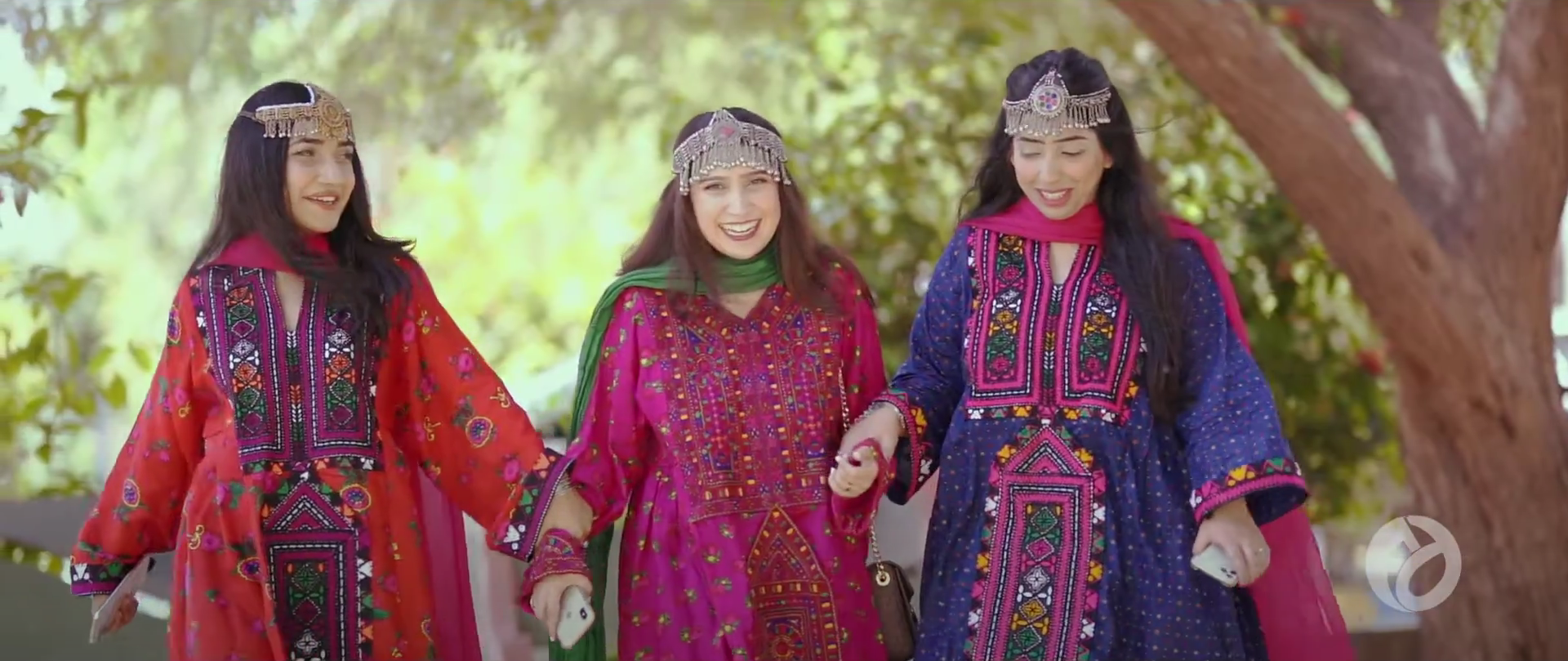
Sindhi Ghagho.

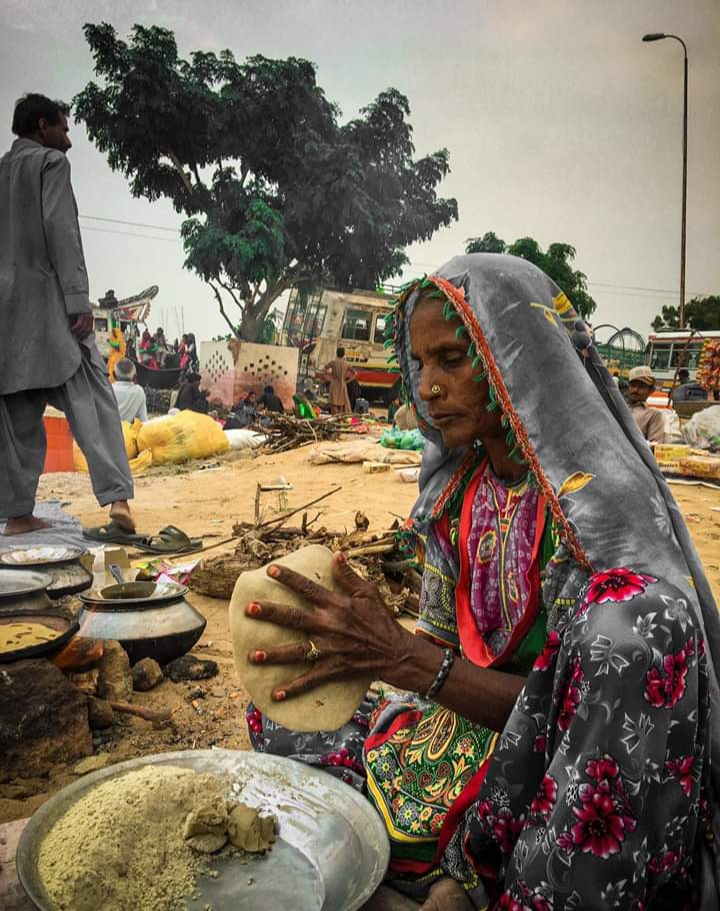
Sindhi dress of Thar.

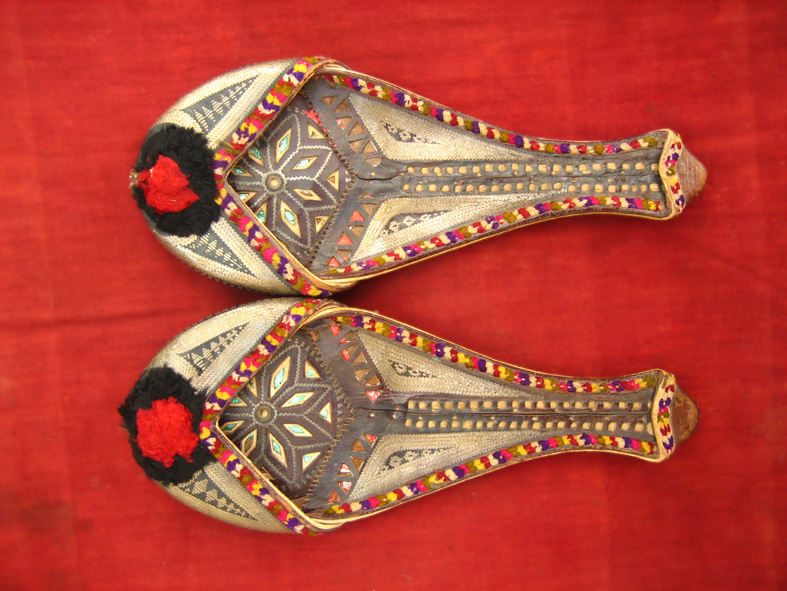
Sindhi Mojri (women shoes).

==== Punjab ====
Punjabi women wear the straight cut Punjabi shalwar kameez, which is most frequently worn. Punjabi women, in villages, also wear the Pothohari shalwar, the Patiala shalwar, the laacha (tehmat), kurti, ghagra, lehenga, and phulkari.

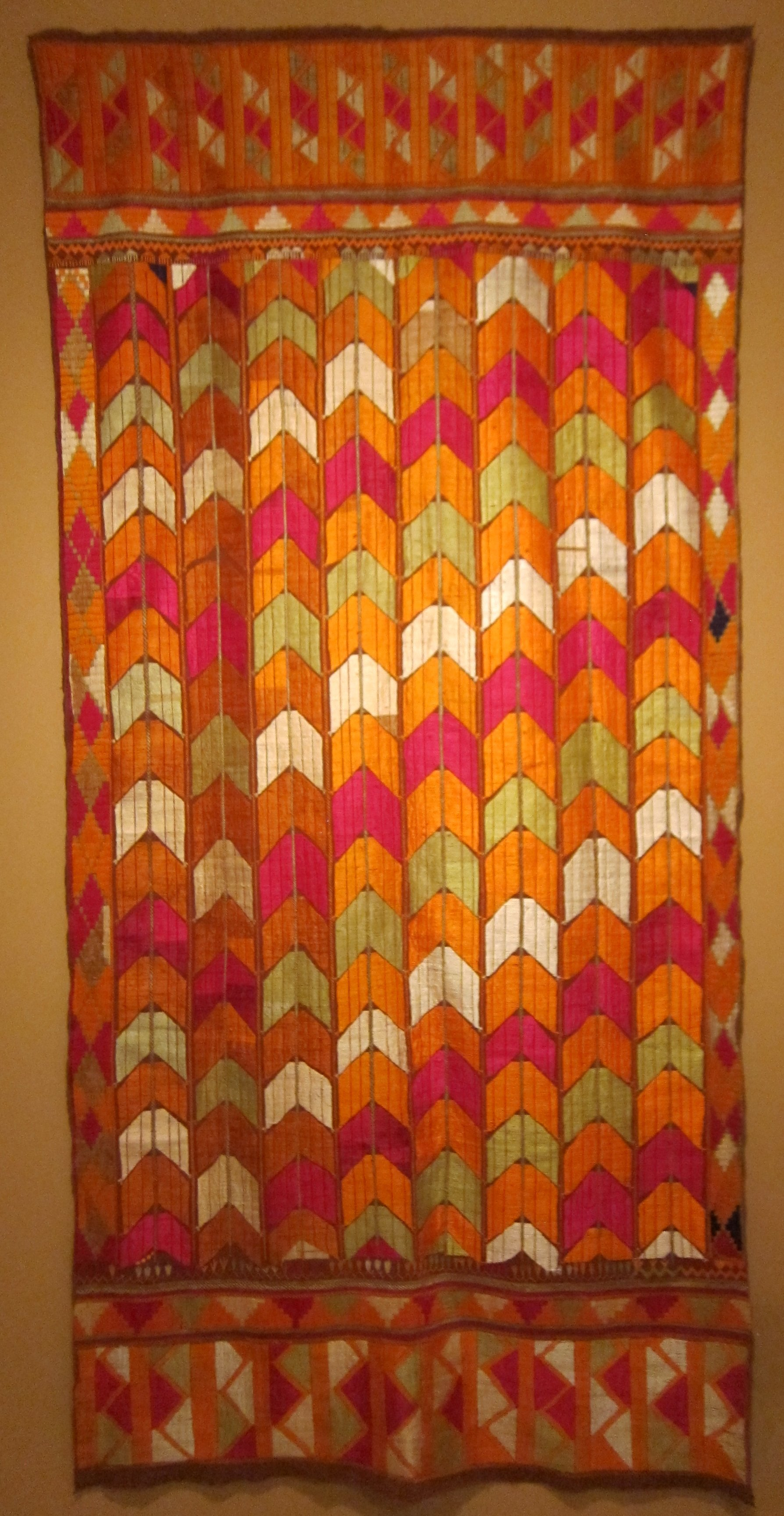
Phulkari

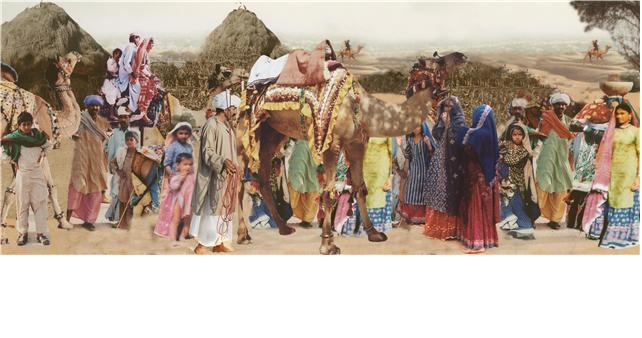
Saraiki Tradition women wearing ghagra

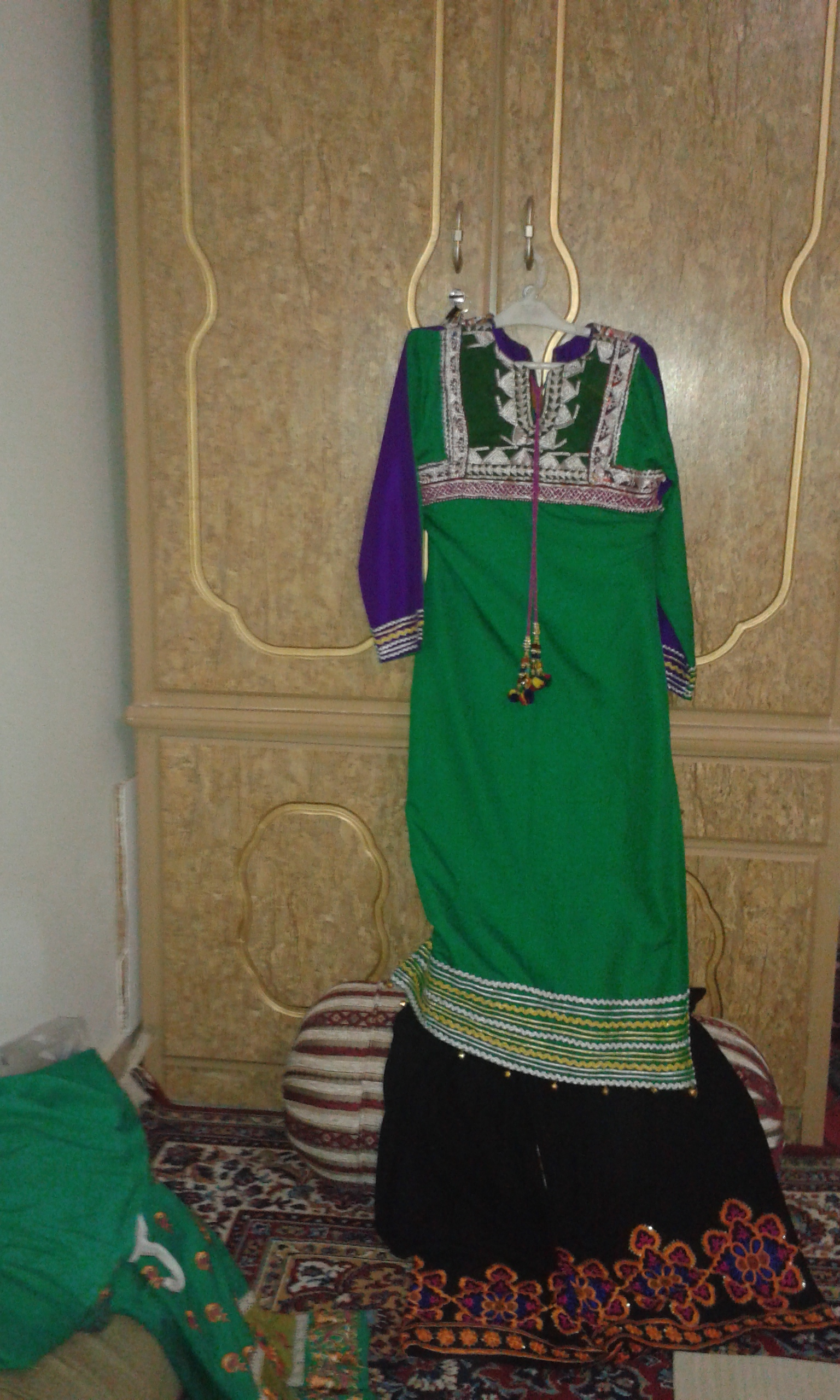
Cultural dress

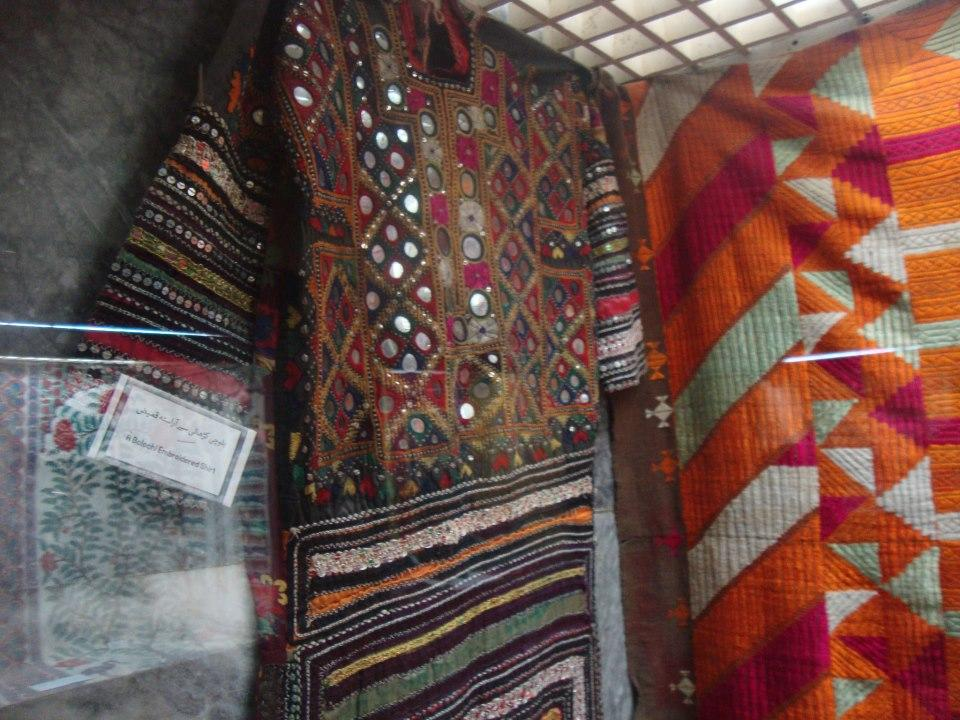
Bahawalpur kameez

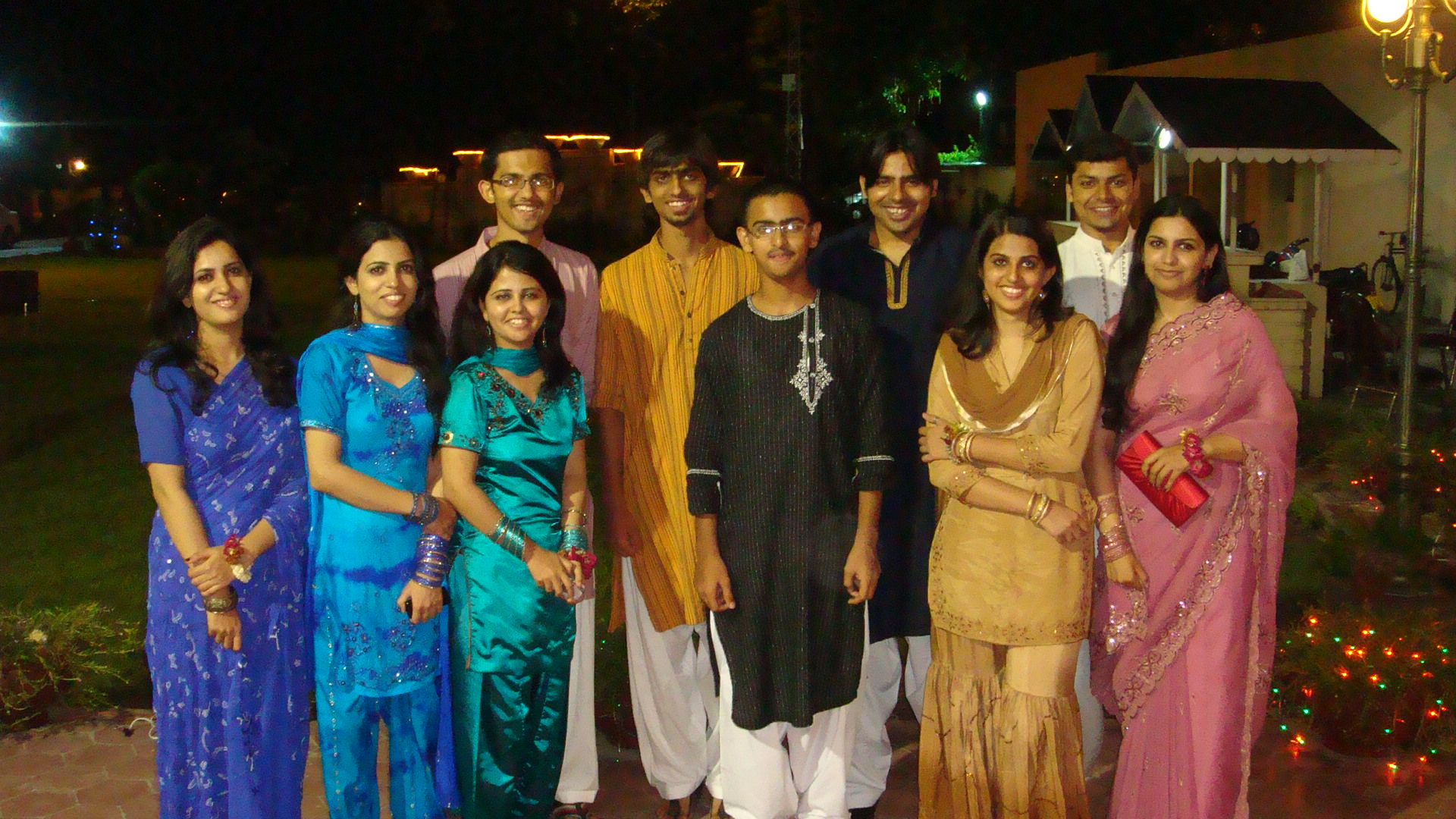
Pakistani Punjabi people at a wedding

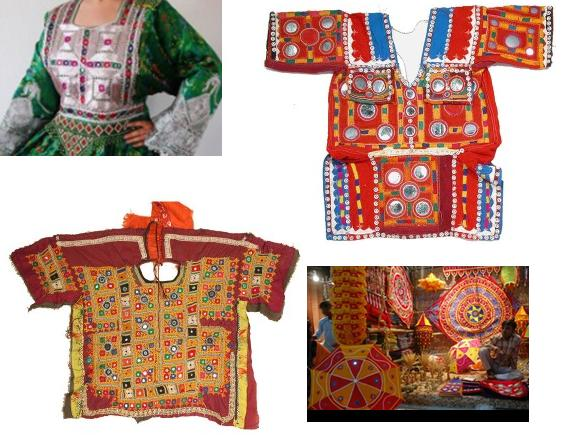
Saraiki fashion

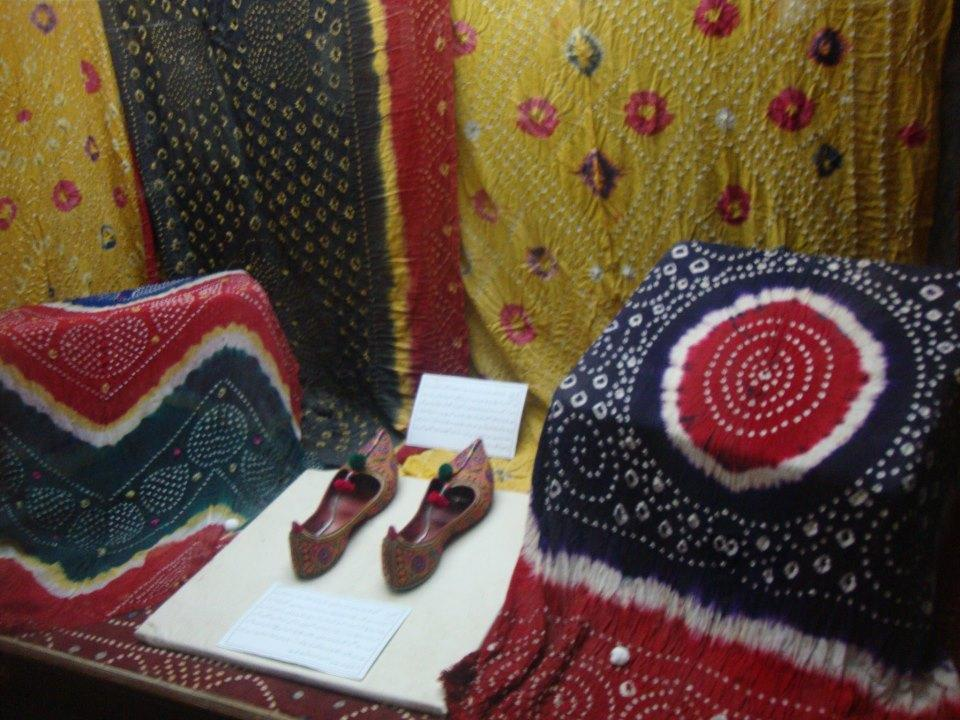
Rohi woman's dress

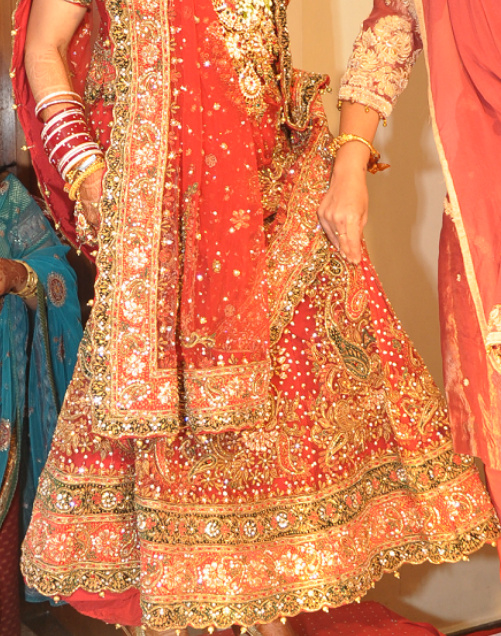
Lehenga with Gota Embroidery

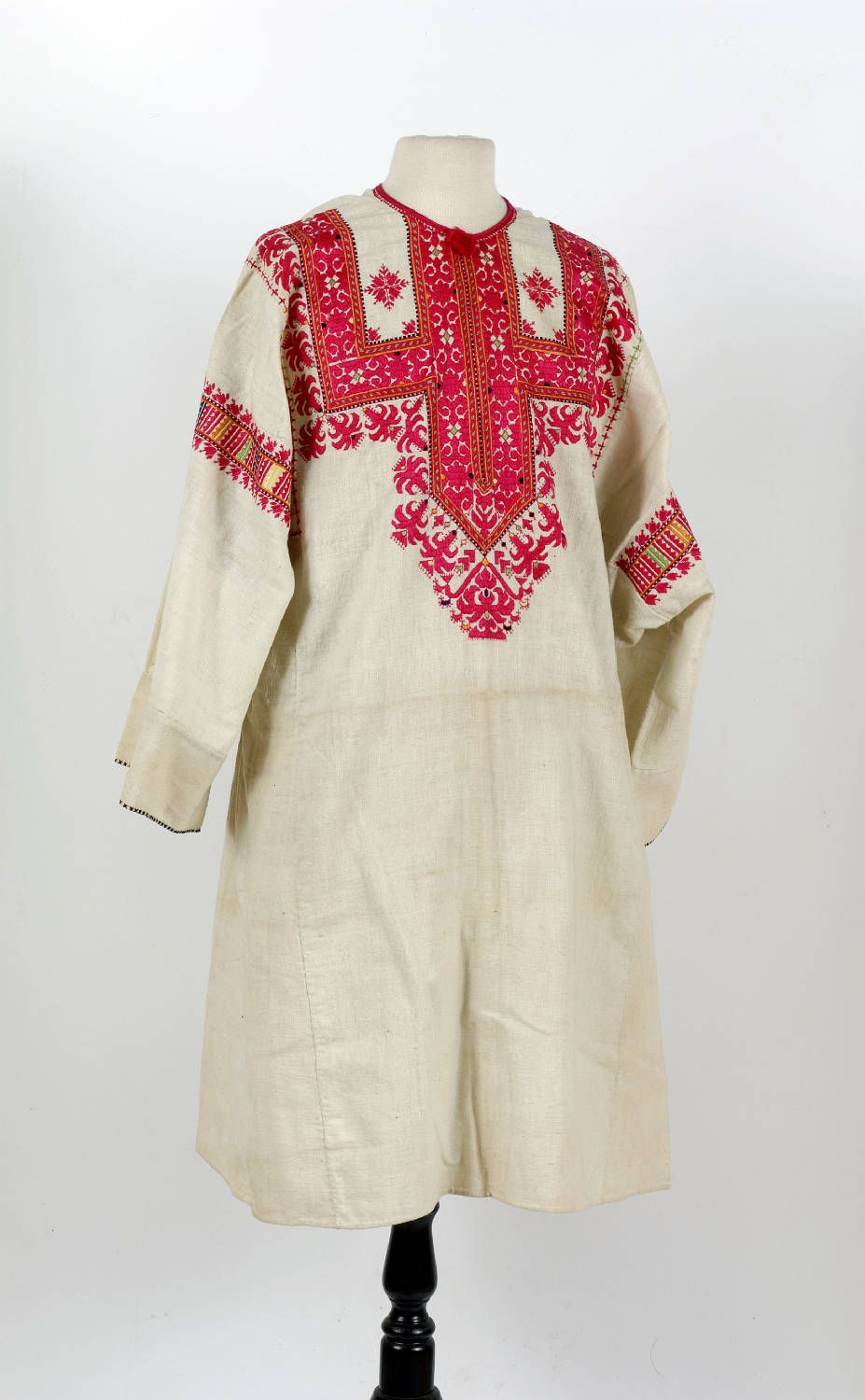
Josephine Powell Collection, voor 1965. Phulkari kurta

==== Khyber Pakhtunkhwa ====
In urban areas women typically wear the shalwar kameez. Pashtun women commonly wear shalwar kameez and in some regions, particularly in Tribal areas, women wear firaq partug which is also worn in neighbouring Afghanistan. In Kalash region, women wear embroidered long shirts.

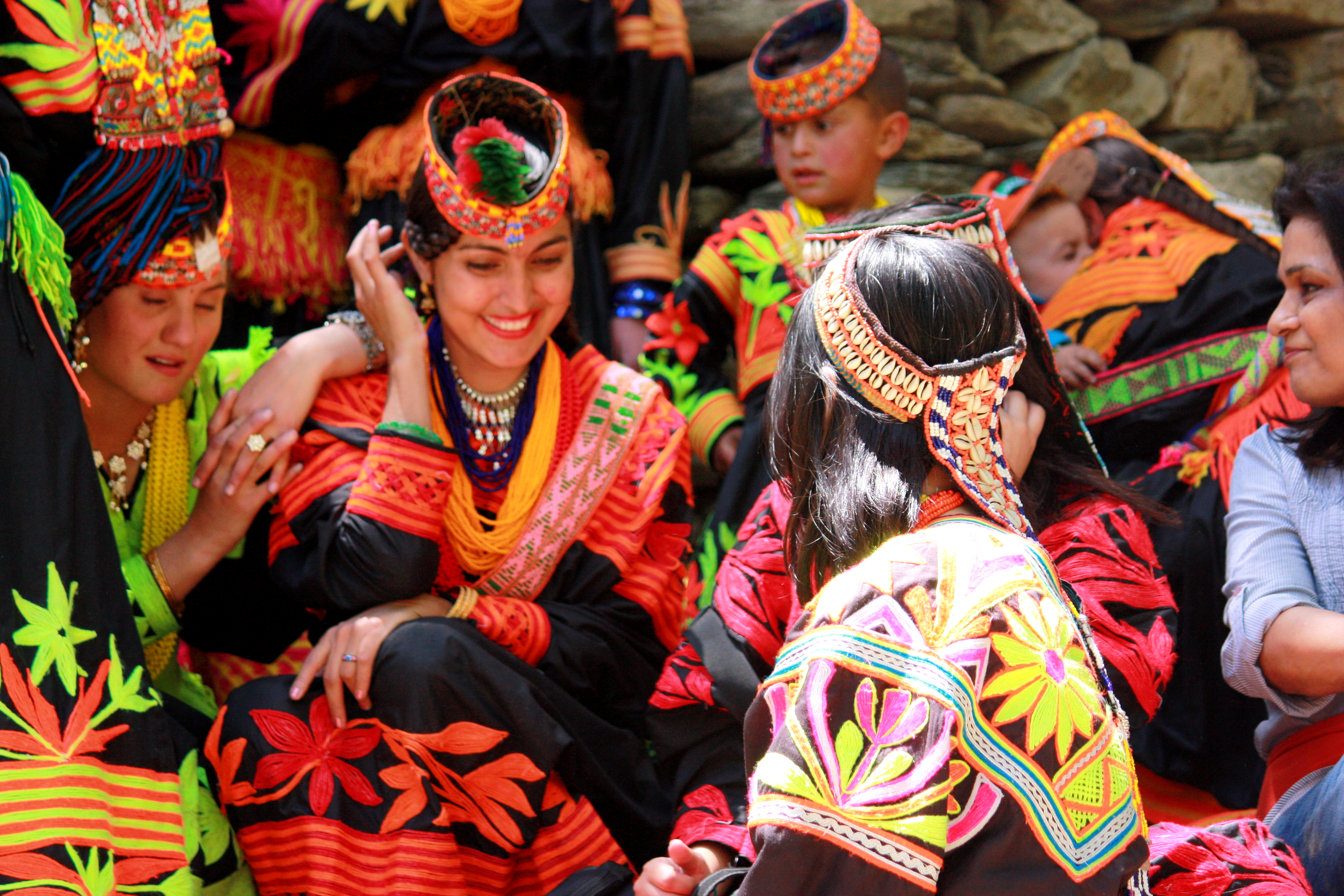
Kalash women traditional clothing

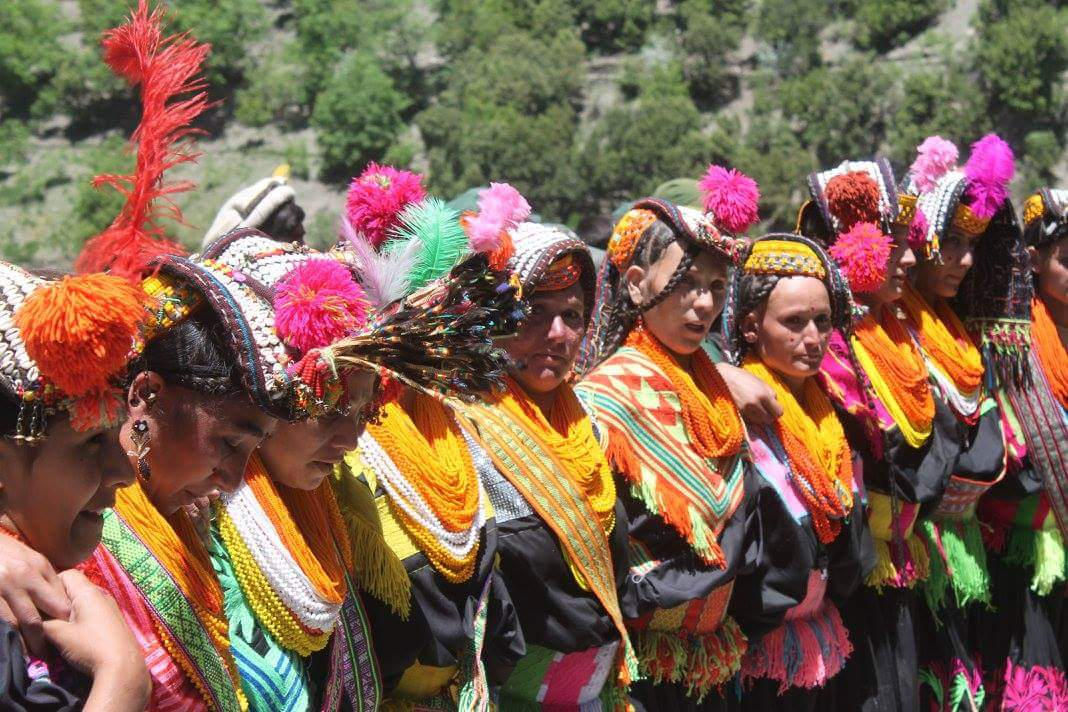
Kalash valley

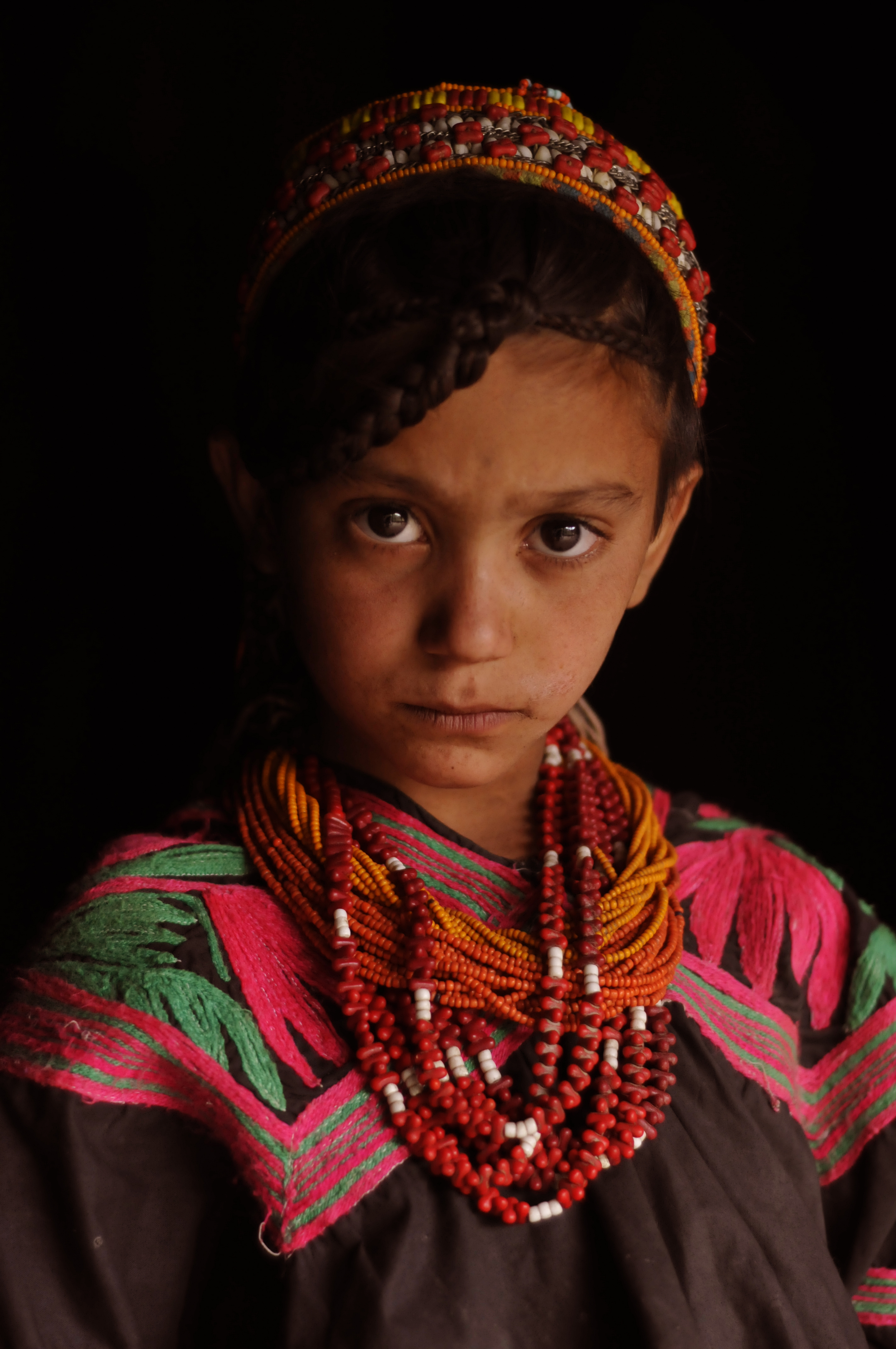
Kalash girl

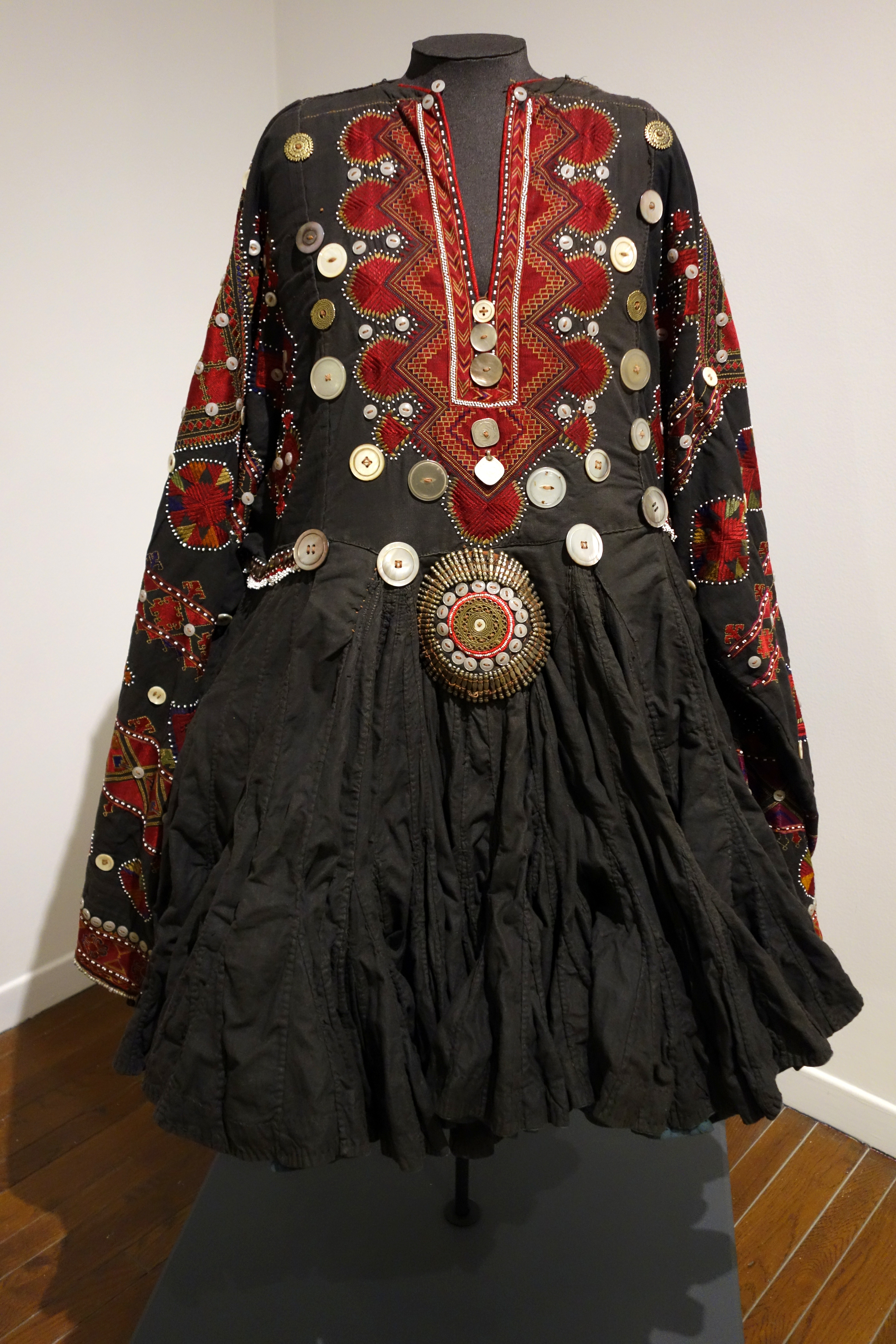
Wedding dress (jumlo), Indus Kohistan, Northwest Frontier Province, Pakistan, view 1, mid 20th century, cotton, metal and glass beads, plastic buttons - Textile Museum of Canada - DSC00930

Child of Khyber Pakhtunkhwa. 1920 approx.

== Wedding dresses ==
In Pakistan, the traditional wedding ceremony is celebrated by wearing different clothes in each wedding event. Usually, the style and designs of wedding attire vary across different regions from north to the south among different ethnic communities. However, in major urban cities such as Karachi, Lahore, Faisalabad, and Rawalpindi, on the occasion of the Rasm-e-Heena (Mendhi), men wear an embroidered Kameez in glittering colours with simple shalwar. Up to the wedding day, the bride may wear a yellow or orange kameez, with a simple shalwar, Patiala shalwar, yellow dupatta, and yellow paranda — more commonly in the Punjab region of Pakistan. However, in other regions customs vary. For example, in the north-west, particularly in the tribal areas, it is customary for a bride to wear Firaq Partug.

During Baraat and Walima functions, the groom usually wears kurta shalwar or kurta churidar with special sherwani and khussa. However, in some regions, including Balochistan, among Baloch and Pashtuns (in the north of the province), and Khyber Pakhtunkhwa province, mostly among Pashtuns and Kohistanis, grooms customarily wear simple, more often white, colour shalwar kameez and a traditional Baloch Bugti chappal (in Baloch dominated regions) or kheri in Khyber Pakhtunkhwa and a traditional headwear such as the Pashtun style Patke or a Baloch style turban.

In Sindh the wedding clothing are usually cotton white or half white Salwar Khamis for men with white/ajrak/lungee Patko (turban), and embroidered Ajrak or lungee (shawls) over shoulders, other extra red or pink embroidered chadar over shoulders, traditional "Morh" (sehra), stick in one hand, "gano" wristband on other and a sword or dagger as well, the shoes are traditional Sindhi jutti or sandals. The Sindhi bride wear red color heavy embroidered lehenga choli/cholo as wedding dress, with two veils and a lot of jewelries and ornaments.

In Punjab and Karachi, during the event of baraat, grooms may wear traditional sehra on their heads, and brides may normally wear a shalwar kameez.

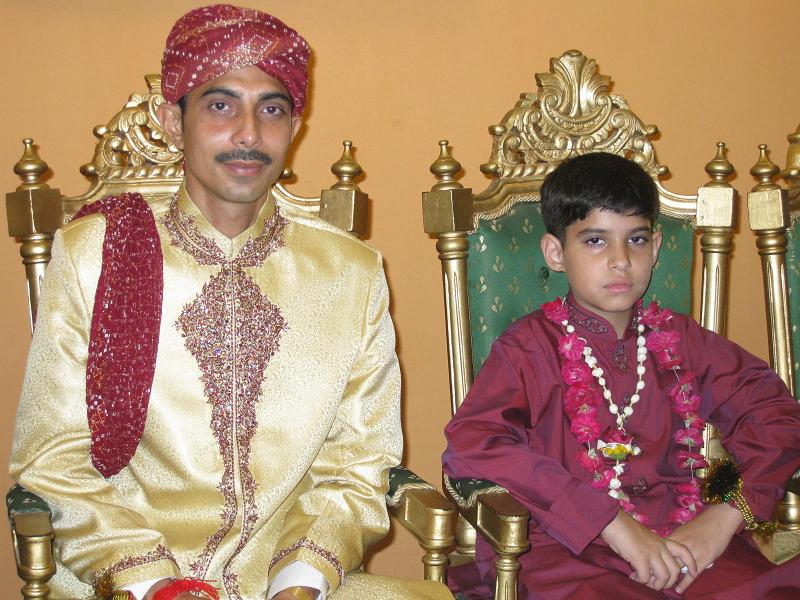
Wedding in Punjab

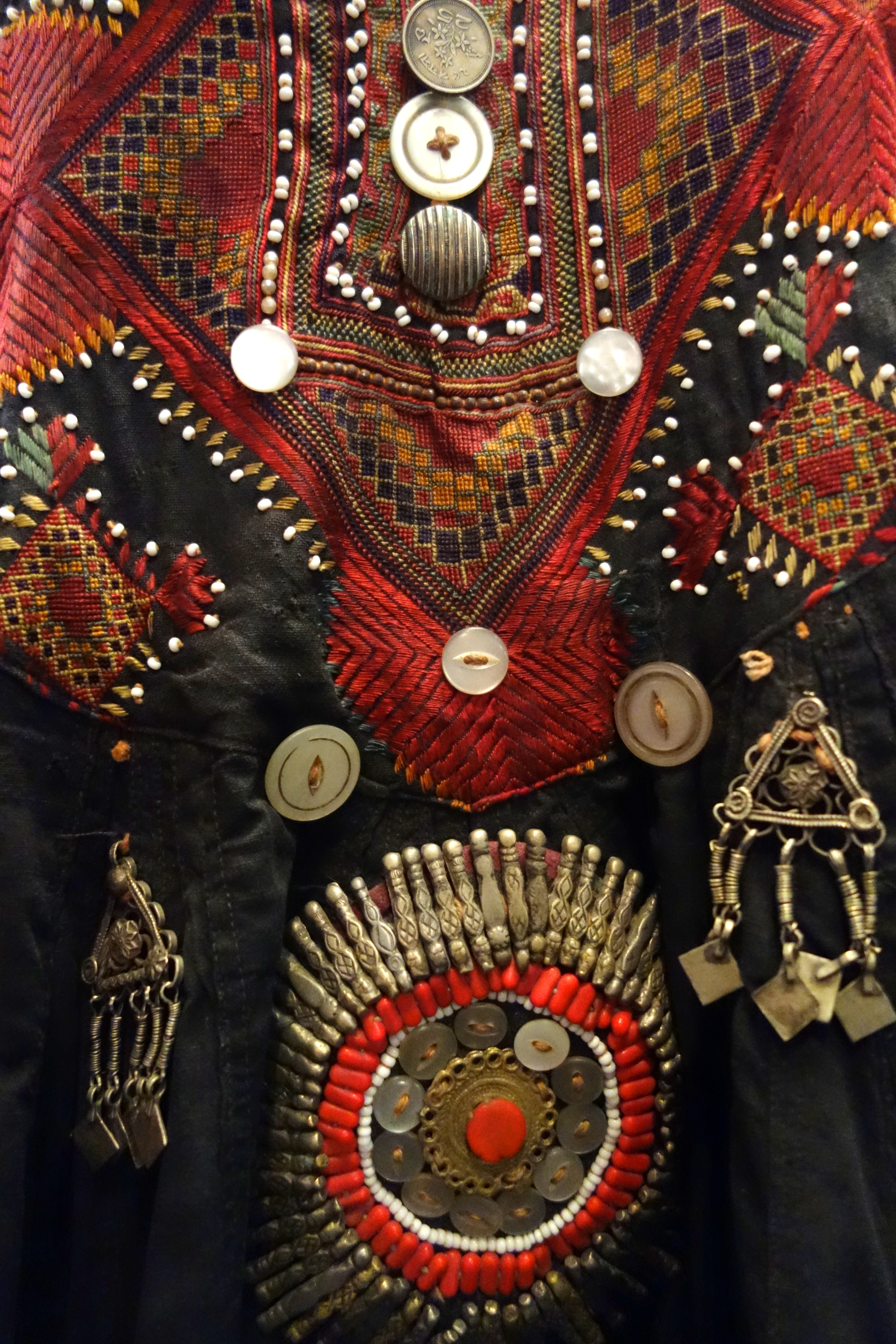
Embroidered dress, view 2, Kohistan, Northwest Frontier Province, Pakistan, early 20th century, cotton, silk, glass, plastic, silver, brass - Fernbank Museum of Natural History - DSC00131

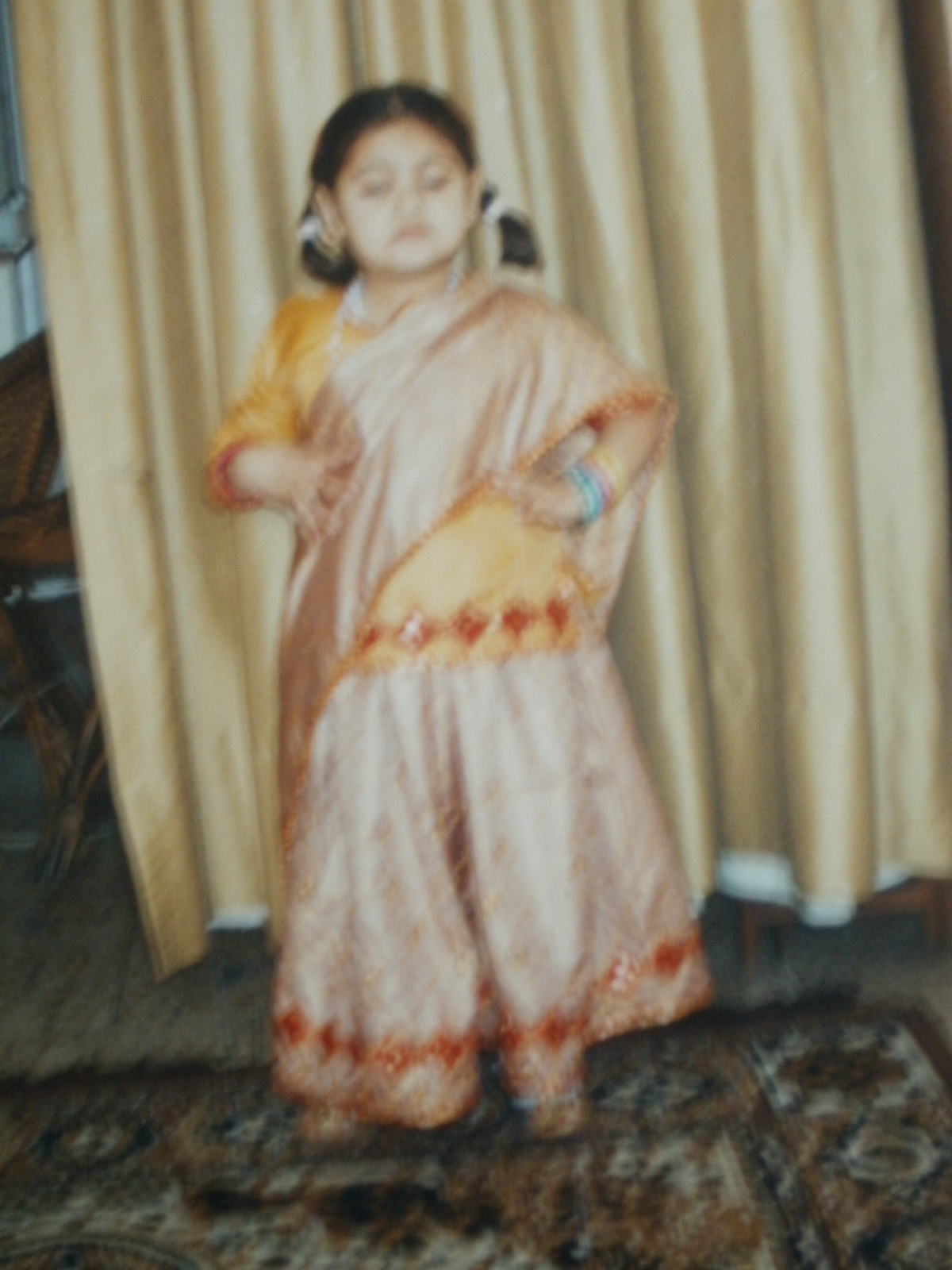
A Pakistani girl in traditional formal ghagra dress

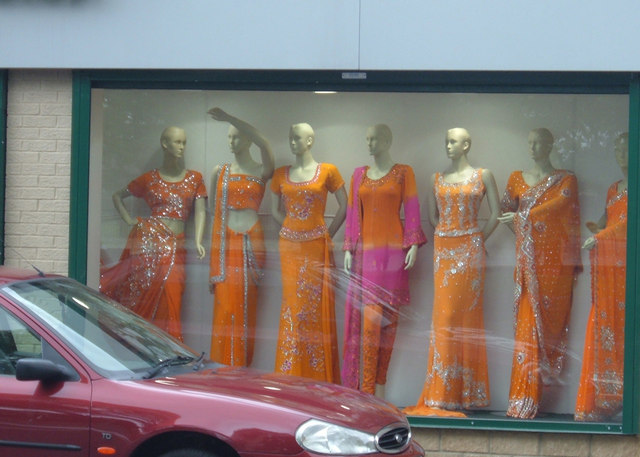
Pakistani Bazaar, showcasing lehengas and saris

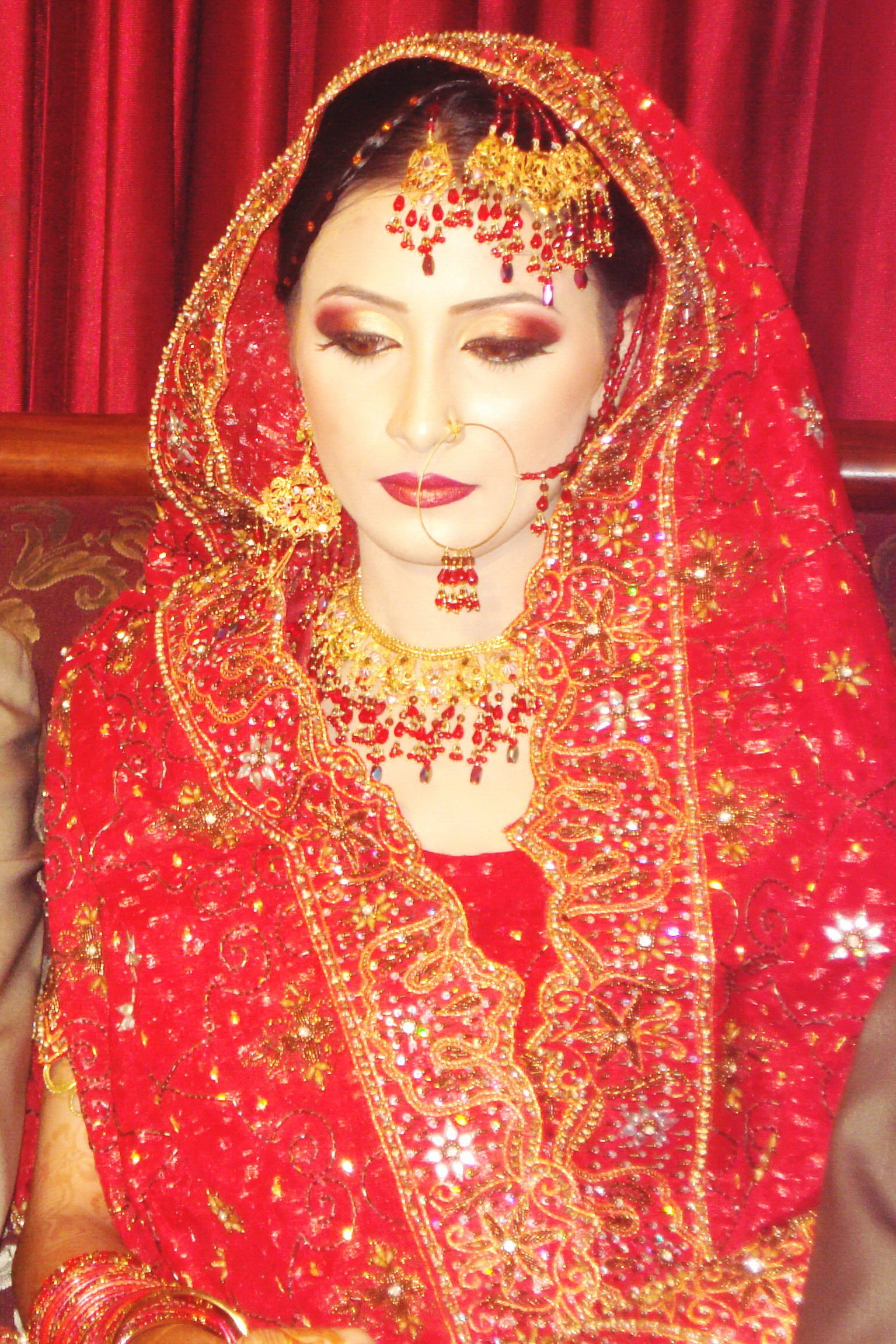
A bride in Punjab

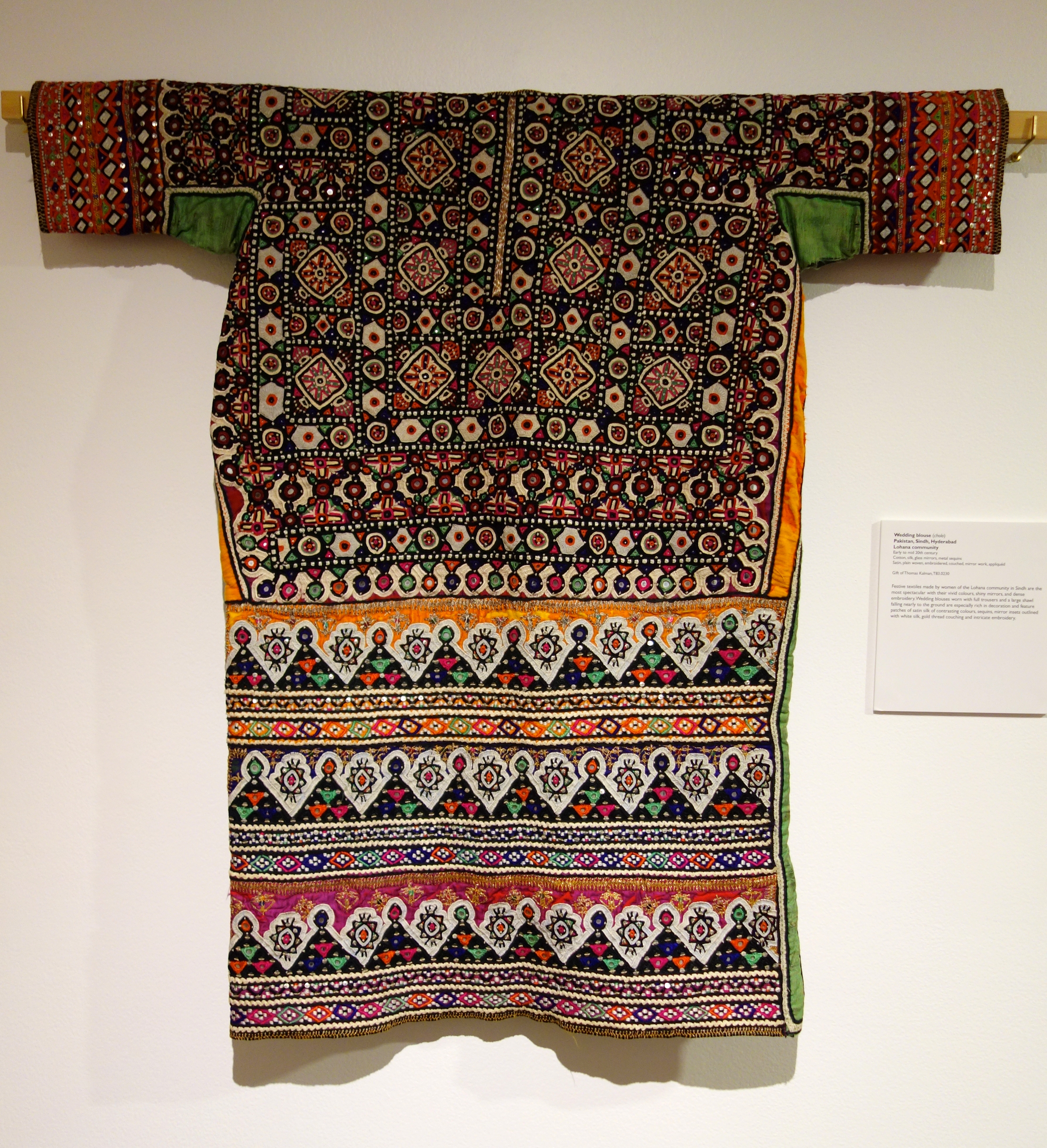
Sindhi embroidered wedding Cholo from Hyderabad.

== Pakistani clothing companies and brands ==
The following is a list of notable Pakistani clothing companies and brands.

- Khaadi
- Sapphire
- Maria B
- Sana Safinaz
- Junaid Jamshed
- Nishat Linen
- Gul Ahmed
- Bareeze
- HSY Studio
- ChenOne
- Zainab Chottani

== Pakistani fashion ==
Pakistan Fashion Design Council, based in Lahore, organizes Fashion Week and Fashion Pakistan, based in Karachi, organizes fashion shows in that city. Credit goes to Ayesha Tammy Haq, a British-trained lawyer and chief executive of Fashion Pakistan, who came up with the idea for Pakistan’s first fashion week, held in November 2009.

=== Pakistani fashion industry ===
Pakistani fashion industry is introducing Pakistani traditional dresses all over the world as cultural representatives and is becoming a reason to introduce international trends in Pakistan. Pakistani media, Film Industry, and Internet have the biggest roles in promoting fashion in Pakistan. There are a lot of TV Channels, Magazines, Portals, and websites which are working only for the fashion industry.

==== Pakistani fashion designers ====
- Maria B
- Junaid Jamshed
- Maheen Khan
- Sadaf Malaterre
- Zainab Chottani

==== Pakistani fashion brands ====
- Khaadi
- Sapphire
- Sana Safinaz
- Nishat Linen
- Gul Ahmed
- ChenOne
- Zainab Chottani

==== Pakistani fashion models ====
The following is a list of Pakistani models.

===== Male models =====
- Ahmed Butt
- Aijaz Aslam
- Fawad Afzal Khan
- Fahad Mustafa
- Azfar Rehman
- Mikaal Zulfiqar
- Feroze Khan
- Usama Khan

===== Female models =====
- Meesha Shafi
- Maya Ali
- Amina Haq
- Ayesha Omar
- Ayyan Ali
- Iman Ali
- Sabeeka Imam
- Juggan Kazim
- Iffat Rahim
- Mariyah Moten
- Mehreen Raheel
- Nargis Fakhri
- Noor
- Reema Khan
- Rabia Butt
- Rubya Chaudhry
- Saba Qamar
- Sadia Imam
- Sana (Lollywood)
- Sunita Marshall
- Tooba Siddiqui
- Vaneeza Ahmad
- Veena Malik
- Yasmeen Ghauri
- Zara Sheikh
- Zainab Qayyum

==== Pakistani fashion stylists ====
Here is a list of Pakistani Fashion stylists

- Tariq Amin

==== Pakistani fashion events ====
Extensive fashion activities are shown in Pakistani fashion events held in different parts of the country as well as abroad.

- Lahore Fashion Week
- Karachi Fashion Week
- Miss Pakistan World

==== Pakistani fashion awards ====
- Hum Awards
- Lux Style Awards

==== Pakistani fashion schools ====
Here is a list of Pakistani fashion institutes.

- Pakistan Institute of Fashion and Design
- National College of Arts
- Indus Valley School of Art and Architecture
- National Textile University
- Punjab Tianjin University of Technology

==== Pakistani fashion media ====
Here is a list of Pakistani fashion media.

- Style 360
- Fashion TV Pakistan

==== See also ====
- 1950s in Pakistani fashion
- 1970s in Pakistani fashion
- 2000s in Pakistani fashion
- 2010s in Pakistani fashion

== See also ==
- Punjabi clothing
- Pashtun clothing
- Balochi clothing
