= Jawani Phir Nahi Ani =

2015 film by Nadeem Baig

- Theatrical release poster
- Urdu: جوانی پھر نہیں آنی
- Directed by: Nadeem Baig
- Written by: Vasay Chaudhry
- Produced by: Humayun Saeed; Salman Iqbal; Shahzad Nasib; Jarjees Seja
- Starring: Humayun Saeed; Hamza Ali Abbasi; Ahmad Ali Butt; Vasay Chaudhry; Mehwish Hayat; Sohai Ali Abro
- Cinematography: Mujahid Raza
- Edited by: Rizwan AQ
- Music by: Ahmad Ali Butt; Shani Arshad; Sahir Ali Bagga
- Production company: Six Sigma Plus
- Distributed by: ARY Films; Eros Worldwide
- Release date: 25 September 2015 (worldwide)
- Running time: 156 minutes
- Country: Pakistan
- Language: Urdu
- Budget: Rs. 85 million (US$300,000)
- Box office: Rs. 494.4 million (US$1.8 million)

Jawani Phir Nahi Ani (lit. 'Youth won't come again'), sometimes abbreviated as JPNA, is a 2015 Pakistani adventure romantic comedy film directed by Nadeem Baig. It was co-produced by Humayun Saeed, Salman Iqbal and Shahzad Nasib at Saeed's production house, Six Sigma Plus. It is the first installment in the film series. The film stars Humayun Saeed, Hamza Ali Abbasi, Ahmad Ali Butt, Vasay Chaudhry and Mehwish Hayat. The supporting cast includes Sohai Ali Abro, Jawed Sheikh, Ismail Tara, Bushra Ansari, Ayesha Khan, Sarwat Gillani and Uzma Khan. The film is about a divorce lawyer who is a bachelor. He takes his three married friends on a trip to Thailand to help them escape their wives and the monotony of their lives.

The film was shot in various locations in Thailand including Bangkok, Pattaya and Coral Island. A few scenes were shot in Karachi. On 5 June 2015, the film wrapped up and the post-production began. The film was released on Eid al-Adha, 25 September 2015. It received positive reviews from critics and grossed Rs. 494 million worldwide, becoming the highest grossing Pakistani film at the time, breaking the record of Waar (2013). This record was then broken by Punjab Nahi Jaungi (2017). It is currently the sixth-highest-grossing Pakistani film.

A sequel, Jawani Phir Nahi Ani 2, was released on August 22, 2018, with Baig returning as a director.

== Plot ==
Three childhood friends, Saif (Hamza Ali Abbasi), Sheikh (Vasay Chaudhry) and Pervez (Ahmad Ali Butt), have settled down in married life but are afraid of their wives. Their friend Sherry (Humayun Saeed), a divorce lawyer, returns to Pakistan from the United States and finds that all his friends are in miserable marriages. Sherry treats the wives well so that they allow their husbands to accompany Sherry on a road trip to Khyber Pakhtunkhwa. Sherry actually plans to take the men to Bangkok to add excitement to their lives.

In Bangkok, Sherry meets a girl named Marina (Mehwish Hayat) and they fall in love. However, when Sherry learns that Marina is the daughter of a crime boss named Bichi Don (Ismail Tara), he wants to leave Bangkok to get away from Marina.

The men's wives, having learnt of the deception, arrive at the Bangkok hotel where the group are staying. Pervez tries to commit suicide by jumping off the hotel but is saved when he lands in a swimming pool. Sherry tells the wives that the trip was the men's idea and not his. The wives demand divorces from their husbands, saying they can no longer trust them.

A few months pass and the three friends learn that Sherry is to marry Zoya (Sohai Ali Abro). She is the daughter of Mehboob Khan (Javed Sheikh), a billionaire in Lahore. Zoya is the quintessential nouveau riche kid, who insists on speaking with a strong American-English accent and abbreviates expressions like "OMG" (Oh my God) and "MA" (Masha'Allah). She enjoys clicking selfies and spending her father's money carelessly. Zoya's mother (Bushra Ansari), worries about her daughter's attitude.

When the three friends arrive at Sherry's wedding, he asks them not to tell Zoya and her family about Marina. Bichi Don arrives at the wedding and introduces himself as "Ya Sheikh", a friend of Mehboob Khan. Sherry tells everyone that his friend, Saif's nickname is also Sherry. The farce is that no one knows which Sherry anyone is talking about.

Two days before the marriage, Marina arrives. Sherry wants Marina's father to reject him as a potential son-in-law, so he pretends to be a homosexual. The play works and Marina and her father leave, only to return on the day of the wedding. Mehboob Khan and Marina's father, (Ya Sheikh) argue about Sherry and this results in both men rejecting Sherry as a potential son-in-law. The story ends when the three friends patch things up with their wives and Sherry asks for Marina's hand in marriage.

== Cast ==
- Humayun Saeed as Shereyar/Sherry (Marina's love interest)
- Hamza Ali Abbasi as Saif Ahmed (Kubra's husband)
- Ahmad Ali Butt as Parvez/Pipi (Lubna's husband)
- Vasay Chaudhry as Sheikh (Gul's husband)
- Mehwish Hayat as Marina (Shereyar's love interest)
- Sohai Ali Abro as Zoya (Mehboob's daughter)
- Sarwat Gillani as Gul (Sheikh's wife)
- Aisha Khan as Kubra (Saif's wife)
- Uzma Khan as Lubna (Parvez's wife)
- Jawed Sheikh as Mehboob Khan (Zoya's father)
- Bushra Ansari as Jabbo (Zoya's mother)
- Ismail Tara as Don / Yaa Sheikh (Marina's father)
- Bashar Amir Shafi as Pipi's son (child artist)

=== Special appearance ===
- Gohar Rasheed as XYZ (fashion designer)
- Farhan Ally Agha as Sherry's father
- Yasra Rizvi as Sherry's mother
- Saba Hameed as Madame
- Naveed Raza as Lawyer
- Zainab Qayyum as Lawyer
- Ali Kazmi as Dr. Aamir Liaquat Khan
- Fahad Mustafa as Himself
- Zainab Jamil as Charity
- Bilal Lashari as Police officer
- Wajid Khan as Stylist
- Ali Rizvi as Caller
- Saife Hassan as Lawyer
- Adnan Siddiqui as himself (in picture)
- Shakeel Hussain Khan as a caller
- Viktor Krav as Gangster

== Production ==
=== Filming ===
The film was shot in various locations in Thailand including Bangkok, Pattaya and Coral Island. A few scenes were shot in Karachi. On 5 June 2015, the film wrapped and post-production began.

"...The final day of the shoot was quite tough as it was very hot in Karachi so it was a relief that it went smoothly. Hamza Ali Abbasi, Ahmed Butt, Vasay Chaudhry and I also got our faces clean-shaved for the final portion which was quite fun. The entire team including cast members, the crew and myself are very happy with the final results and excited to see the feedback from audiences now."

— Humayun Saeed speaking about last shot of film.

=== Marketing ===
On 31 March 2015, a teaser was released by ARY Films on ARY Digital Network. On 15 August 2015, the trailer was released. The video promotion of one of the movie's soundtracks, Jalwa (sung by Sana Zulfiqar and Sahir Ali Bagga) was released on 26 August 2015. Five theatrical posters of the film, featuring the main cast, were released at ARY Films' official Facebook page on 29 August 2015. Two days later, another soundtrack, Khul Jaye Botal was released on television channels on the ARY Digital Network. On 18 September 2015, a second trailer (edited by Bilal Lashari) was released. The cast appeared on several morning television shows including Morning with Juggan on 18 September 2015 and Good Morning Pakistan on Eid al-Adha (a feast day in Pakistan) to promote their movie.

== Soundtrack ==
The film's music album consists of 6 songs. A soundtrack album was released on Saavn.

Jawani Phir Nahi Ani
No.	Title	Singer(s)	Length
1.	"Khul Jaye Botal"	Mika Singh, Tehreem Muniba, Shani Haider	04:28
2.	"Dance The Party"	Ali Gul Pir, Shuja Haider	3:05
3.	"Jalwa"	Sana Zulfiqar, Sahir Ali Bagga	4:41
4.	"Jay Mundiya"	Sana Zulfiqar, Shani Haider	04:58
5.	"Aisa Jorh Hai"	Sara Raza Khan, Nabeel Shaukat Ali	05:19
6.	"Jawani Phir Nahi Ani"	Ahmad Ali Butt, Faiza Mujahid	03:43
Total length:			26 mins

== Release ==
On 19 September 2015, Jawani Phir Nahi Ani premiered in the CineStar IMAX Lahore. Selected media personnel and celebrities, including Mahesh Bhatt attended. Another premiere was held on 20 September 2015 at Nueplex Cinemas in DHA, Karachi. On 23 September 2015, the film premiered in Dubai and on 24 September 2015 in New York City. The Chicago premiere was held on 26 September 26, 2015 and the Los Angeles premiere on 27 September 2015.

== Reception ==
=== Box office ===
Jawani Phir Nahi Ani became the biggest opener for any Pakistani film to that date with collecting ₨ 2.07 crore, excluding previous day's limited release. It broke the previous day 1 record of Waar having ₨ 1.14 crore.

The film collected Rs 2.7 crores on its second day of screening. The total over the first two days was approximately Rs 5 crores. The film collected over Rs 27 crores on the first Sunday of its release. The international earnings on the first weekend was Rs. 2.5 crore. In its first week, the film grossed over Rs 13.7 crores, breaking a record for the highest domestic first week totals. The film's second weekend earnings was Rs 5 crores. Three weeks after its premiere screening, the film had earned Rs 26.5 crores becoming the highest-grossing film in Pakistan. The film had grossed Rs 35.25 crores at the end of its third week, becoming the highest-grossing Pakistani film worldwide. The film ended its run by collecting Rs 34 crores locally, and Rs 15.44 crores from overseas with a total gross of Rs 49.44 crores the best earning Pakistani film to that date.

=== Critical reception ===
The film received positive reviews from critics in Pakistan. Rafay Mahmood of The Express Tribune rated the film "3 out of 5 stars". He said, "for all its flaws, Jawani Phir Nahi Ani is a thoroughly entertaining film that will reward you if you don't think it out too much". He praised the performances of Saeed and Butt. Asim Malik of Daily Times wrote, "this flick is a complete package and every one made sure that the details are covered". Salima Feerasta of DAWN praised Saeed, Butt, Chaudhry, Abbasi and Hayat and said "despite its flaws, Jawani Phir Nahi Ani is an out-and-out entertainer. An engaging blend of slapstick, spoofs and wit, the film is easy on the eye and an undemanding crowd-pleaser. Definitely worth the price of admission".

Naveen Qazi of Siddy Says rated the film as "4.5 out of 5 stars". He said, "staunch religious views and conservative mind-set should be left at home".

=== Home media ===
The film had a television premier on Eid al-Fitr, 4 July 2016, on ARY Digital.

== Accolades ==
At the 2nd ARY Film Awards, Jawani Phir Nahi Ani received twenty-nine nominations and won eighteen categories. At the 15th Lux Style Awards, the film won two awards from ten nominations.

Year	Ceremony	Category	Recipient(s)	Result	Ref.
2016	2nd ARY Film Awards	Best Film Jury	Jawani Phir Nahi Ani	Won	
2016	2nd ARY Film Awards	Best Director Jury	Nadeem Baig	Won	
2016	2nd ARY Film Awards	Best Film	Jawani Phir Nahi Ani	Won	
2016	2nd ARY Film Awards	Best Director	Nadeem Baig	Won	
2016	2nd ARY Film Awards	Best Actor	Humayun Saeed	Won	
2016	2nd ARY Film Awards	Best Actress	Mehwish Hayat	Nominated	
2016	2nd ARY Film Awards	Best Actress	Sohai Ali Abro	Won	
2016	2nd ARY Film Awards	Best Supporting Actor	Hamza Ali Abbasi	Won	
2016	2nd ARY Film Awards	Best Supporting Actor	Ahmed Ali Butt	Nominated	
2016	2nd ARY Film Awards	Best Supporting Actor	Vasay Chaudhry	Nominated	
2016	2nd ARY Film Awards	Best Supporting Actress	Aisha Khan	Won	
2016	2nd ARY Film Awards	Best Supporting Actress	Sarwat Gilani	Nominated	
2016	2nd ARY Film Awards	Best Star Debut Male	Ahmed Ali Butt	Nominated	
2016	2nd ARY Film Awards	Best Star Debut Male	Vasay Chaudhry	Nominated	
2016	2nd ARY Film Awards	Best Star Debut Female	Sarwat Gilani	Nominated	
2016	2nd ARY Film Awards	Best Actor in a Comic Role	Bushra Ansari	Nominated	
2016	2nd ARY Film Awards	Best Actor in a Comic Role	Ahmed Ali Butt	Won	
2016	2nd ARY Film Awards	Best Actor in a Negative Role	Ismail Tara	Nominated	
2016	2nd ARY Film Awards	Best Playback Singer – Female	Sana Zulfiqar	Nominated	
2016	2nd ARY Film Awards	Best Playback Singer – Male	Mika Singh	Nominated	
2016	2nd ARY Film Awards	Best Story	Vasay Chaudhry	Won	
2016	2nd ARY Film Awards	Best Screenplay	Vasay Chaudhry	Won	
2016	2nd ARY Film Awards	Best Dialogue	Vasay Chaudhry	Won	
2016	2nd ARY Film Awards	Best Original Music	Shani Arshad	Won	
2016	2nd ARY Film Awards	Best Action	Viktor Krav	Won	
2016	2nd ARY Film Awards	Best Choreography	Shabina Khan	Won	
2016	2nd ARY Film Awards	Best Costume Design	Nabila & Jahanzeb Qamar	Won	
2016	2nd ARY Film Awards	Best Makeup and Hairstyling	Nabila	Won	
2016	15th Lux Style Awards	Best Film	Jawani Phir Nahi Ani	Nominated	
2016	15th Lux Style Awards	Best Director	Nadeem Baig	Nominated	
2016	15th Lux Style Awards	Best Actor	Humayun Saeed	Won	
2016	15th Lux Style Awards	Best Actress	Mehwish Hayat	Nominated	
2016	15th Lux Style Awards	Best Supporting Actor	Ahmed Ali Butt	Nominated	
2016	15th Lux Style Awards	Best Supporting Actor	Vasay Chaudhry	Nominated	
2016	15th Lux Style Awards	Best Supporting Actress	Aisha Khan	Won	
2016	15th Lux Style Awards	Best Supporting Actress	Sarwat Gilani	Nominated	
2016	15th Lux Style Awards	Best Supporting Actress	Sohai Ali Abro	Nominated	

== Sequel ==
A sequel, titled Jawani Phir Nahi Ani 2, was announced in February 2017 with producers Humayun Saeed, Salman Iqbal, Jerjees Seja, and Shahzad Nasib returning. Nadeem Baig returned as director, with principal photography commencing in November 2017. The film was released on Eid-ul-Adha, 22 August 2018, featuring returning cast members Humayun Saeed, Ahmed Ali Butt, Vasay Chaudhry, Uzma Khan, and Sarwat Gilani, alongside new additions Fahad Mustafa, Kubra Khan, and Mawra Hocane. The film became the highest-grossing Pakistani film at the time, earning over PKR 700 million worldwide.

== See also ==
- List of directorial debuts
- List of Pakistani films of 2015
- List of highest-grossing Pakistani films
- Jawani Phir Nahi Ani (film series)
