= Jawani Phir Nahi Ani 2 =

2018 Pakistani film by Nadeem Baig

- Theatrical release poster
- Urdu: جوانی پھر نہیں آنی 2
- Directed by: Nadeem Baig
- Written by: Vasay Chaudhry
- Produced by: Humayun Saeed; Salman Iqbal; Shahzad Nasib; Jerjees Seja
- Starring: Humayun Saeed; Fahad Mustafa; Ahmad Ali Butt; Vasay Chaudhry; Kubra Khan; Mawra Hocane
- Cinematography: Suleman Razzaq
- Music by: Ahmad Ali Butt; Arif Lohar; Shani Arshad (score)
- Production companies: Six Sigma Plus; Salman Iqbal Films; ARY Films
- Distributed by: ARY Films
- Release date: 22 August 2018 (Eid al-Adha)
- Running time: 166 minutes
- Country: Pakistan
- Language: Urdu
- Budget: Rs. 130 million (US$470,000)
- Box office: Rs. 700 million (US$2.5 million)

Jawani Phir Nahi Ani 2 (lit. 'Youth won't come again 2'), sometimes abbreviated as JPNA 2, is a 2018 Pakistani Urdu-language romantic comedy film, directed by Nadeem Baig and written by Vasay Chaudhry. It is a joint venture of Salman Iqbal Films, Humayun Saeed and Shahzad Nasib's Six Sigma Plus, and Jerjees Seja's ARY Films. It is a sequel to the 2015 film Jawani Phir Nahi Ani, and the second installment in Jawani Phir Nahi Ani film series. The cast includes Humayun Saeed, Ahmed Ali Butt, Vasay Chaudhry, Uzma Khan and Sarwat Gillani all of whom reprise their roles from previous film, along with Fahad Mustafa, Kubra Khan, and Mawra Hocane who join the franchise.

After the success of the first film, its sequel was soon confirmed in January 2016. The film was officially announced in February 2017. After plot changes and other delays, filming finally began on 8 November 2017. Filming commenced in Istanbul, Turkey & Dubai, United Arab Emirates Filming wrapped up on 7 May 2018.

The film premiered on 19 August at CineStar IMAX Lahore, and on 20 August at Nueplex Cinemas, in DHA, Karachi. It was released on Eid al-Adha, 22 August 2018. It grossed US$331,000 worldwide, making it the second-highest-grossing Pakistani film worldwide, as well as the highest-grossing film ever at the Pakistani box office at the time of release. The film received critical praise for its direction, screenplay, and the performances of the cast. A sequel titled, Jawani Phir Nahi Ani 3 is currently in development, filming began on 8th September 2026 and is scheduled to be released on Eid-Ul-Adha 2027.

== Plot ==
Pervez (Ahmad Ali Butt) and Sheikh (Vasay Chaudhry) are old friends who are living simple and normal life with their wives. Pervez is tired of his wife Lubna (Uzma Khan) talking constantly on her phone with her brother Rahat. Rahat invites Lubna and Pervez to his wedding, along with Sheikh and his wife Gul (Sarwat Gillani). Rahat is a millionaire and all his spending festers Pervez's greater dislike of Rahat.

Sheikh sees his old friend, Sherry, (Humayun Saeed) on TV for Mental Health Day, so he and Pervez go to the hospital where they find out he's an in-patient. The doctor tells them that Sherry's wife, Marina, died following an accident in the USA while parachuting. Sherry attempted suicide multiple times after her death before his admission in the hospital. Sherry slowly recognizes Sheikh but still attempts suicide by stabbing himself with the latter's mobile pen.

Rahat gets engaged to Zoe (Mawra Hocane), the daughter of Balani (Sohail Ahmed), a well-known and well-established Fashion Designer in Turkey. Meanwhile, Sheikh and Pervez are now Sherry's caretakers. Sherry jumps out of the car as they drive him home and tries to kill himself by running in front of passing cars on the road, until he jumps in front of a police car and is arrested alongside Sheikh and Pervez.

Rahat collects them from the police station and takes them to his home, where Rahat is welcomed with a punch that instantly knocks him unconscious. He wakes up in an apartment, (at gunpoint), and finds himself confronted by a mafia leader who accuses him of borrowing $3 million. Finally, the real reason behind his extravagant, rich lifestyle is revealed. Sherry stands in front of the gun to commit suicide; at the same moment, Zoe arrives with Balani. However, Rahat somehow escapes his situation owing to a hilarious role-play. Sherry takes off and a car chase with Rahat, Pervez, and Sheikh causes Sherry to jump from a hill. He survives but gets tangled with Celina (Kubra Khan) who was climbing the hill. The men pull Sherry and Celina away safely. Sherry falls in love with Celina and cancels his plans to die, but learns she is Indian, engaged, and is getting married. She leaves with her fiancé, Sher Ali (Omer Shahzad), for Dubai.

Sherry follows her to Dubai. She tells him they can't get married because her father, Nawab (Kanwaljit Singh), hates Pakistanis. The reason for his hatred is that her father's cricket career was ended because a bouncer by Imran Khan hit him in his face.

Sherry devises a plan to get in Celina's house by disguising Pervez as Celina's wedding planner, "Maina", and Sheikh as his manager. The plan falls through when Sherry meets and reveals the truth to Celina's father, who despite his hatred of Pakistanis, allows the group to stay for the wedding.

Rahat arrives at Nawab's house with Balani and Zoe where it's revealed that Balani is Sher Ali's paternal uncle. Balani also falls in love with "Maina" through a sudden crush. Rahat refuses to let Sherry marry Celina. Sherry vows he will take Celina away, in front of former's intending in-laws. Rahat tries to turn Sher Ali against Sherry, leading Sher Ali to a sword fight Sherry. Nawab, somehow, finds out Sherry loves his daughter, Celina, and demands Sherry leave. Sherry agrees but then shows up on the wedding day. Sherry tells Nawab in front of everyone that he loves Celina and wants to marry her. However, the Mafia leader arrives, revealing how Rahat borrowed money from him and promised to return after marrying Zoe. Zoe, hearing this, leaves, heartbroken.

Sheikh gets Saif (Hamza Ali Abbasi) to call Nawab and act as if he is Imran Khan. Saif tells Nawab that he shouldn't punish Sherry and Celina for the cricket accident. Pervez sheds his disguise as "Maina". Celina tries to convince her father to allow her to marry Sherry in which she is successful and he blesses the couple. Rahat apologizes to Zoe and they reunite.

== Cast ==
- Humayun Saeed as Sheheryar "Sherry"
- Ahmed Ali Butt as Pervez "Pipi", also disguised as Maina who claims to be a wedding planner
- Fahad Mustafa as Rahat; Lubna's brother
- Vasay Chaudhry as Sheikh
- Kubra Khan as Celina
- Mawra Hocane as Zoe
- Sohail Ahmed as Balani; Zoe's father and a fashion designer
- Uzma Khan as Lubna; Pervez's wife
- Sarwat Gillani as Gul; Sheikh's wife
- Shehzad Khan as Sher Ali's father
- Kanwaljit Singh as Nawab; Celina's father
- Kunickaa Sadanand as Celina's mother
- Safina Behroz as Sher Ali's mother
- Omer Shahzad as Nawab Sher Ali Khan; Celina's fiancé.
- Hassan Choudary from Something Haute as Dr Ravi
- Fawad Khan as Tipu Shah (cameo performance was reported to be deleted from the released film)
- Mehwish Hayat as Marina; Sherry's wife (voice cameo)
- Hamza Ali Abbasi as Saif Ahmed (special appearance as Imran Khan)
- Sara Loren as herself (special appearance in song "Ishq Hoa Jo Tari")
- Aisha Khan as Kubra; Saif's wife (voice cameo)
- Rehmat Ajmal as Tipu Shah's fan (cameo)

== Production ==
After success of the first film, its sequel was soon confirmed in January 2016. It was officially announced in February 2017. The leading cast returning to it includes Butt, Chaudhry, Saeed, Gilani and Uzma Khan, with Mehwish Hayat in cameo role. Other cast includes Fahad Mustafa, Mawra Hocane, Kubra Khan, Sohail Ahmed and Omer Shahzad, with Fawad Khan in cameo role. Roles were also offered to Syra Shehroz, and Indian actors Rishi Kapoor, Anupam Kher and Sonam Kapoor, but they didn't join the cast. The film was originally set to be shot in India, however, the plan was cancelled due to tensions created after 2016 Uri attack.

Principal photography took place in Istanbul and Dubai between 8 November 2017 and 7 May 2018. The film score has been composed by Shani Arshad. The film released on Eid al-Adha, 22 August 2018.

== Release ==
The trailer of the film was released on 25 June 2018. The film premiered on 19 August at CineStar IMAX Lahore, and on 20 August at Nueplex Cinemas, in DHA, Karachi. It released on 22 August 2018.

=== Home media ===
The film had a television premier on Eid al-Fitr, 5 June 2019, on ARY Digital.

== Reception ==
=== Box office ===
Jawani Phir Nahi Ani 2 became the biggest opener for any Pakistani film with collecting Rs. 2.99 crore, excluding previous day's limited release. It broke the previous day 1 record of Teefa in Trouble having Rs. 2.31 crore, as well as biggest single day of Punjab Nahi Jaungi having Rs. 2.8 crore. The film also recorded the biggest international opening for any Pakistani film with collecting Rs. 2.17 crore. It became the fastest Pakistani film to cross Rs. 10 crore worldwide within two days. It also crossed Rs. 10 crore in Pakistan within 3 days, and its worldwide gross became Rs. 15.7 crore. It broke the previous first Saturday record of Indian film Sultan in Pakistan with collecting Rs. 3.7 crore. It became the first Pakistani film to cross Rs. 25 crore within 5 days; including Rs. 8.12 crore from overseas. The local gross for seven days was Rs. 20.64 crore, just behind Sultan which collected Rs. 21.17 crore in opening week in Pakistan. The above records in Pakistan were broken by Avengers: Endgame.

Until second weekend, the film made Rs. 29.68 crore, also surpassing the previous record of Indian film Sanju to cross Rs. 25 crore mark in Pakistan within 10 days as well as second weekend record. It reportedly left behind the competitor Indian film Happy Phirr Bhag Jayegi at UK box office. It made the fastest Rs. 30 crore within 13 days in Pakistan. Within two weeks, it recorded the biggest overseas numbers for any Pakistani film and beat the previous record of prequel in Pakistan with crossing Rs. 47 crore. After 18 days, it recorded the fastest Rs. 50 crore at global box office, and became the highest grossing Pakistani film within third weekend after collecting Rs. 53.45 crore, beating the previous record set by Punjab Nahi Jaungi. In Pakistan, it crossed Rs. 40 crore mark in three weeks, and collected Rs. 43.5 crore in four weeks. For the total gross, it crossed Rs. 60 crore worldwide in its fifth weekend. After tenth weekend, it crossed Rs. 50 crore mark nationwide. It collected Rs. 52 crore locally, and Rs. 18 crore from overseas, with a total gross crossing Rs. 70 crore.

=== Critical reception ===
Aamna Haider Isani wrote to Something Haute "it is brilliant in the first half albeit wasted in the second half, which is lost to the unnecessary social message". Omair Alavi rated it 3.5 stars out of 5 and said that the sequel "breaks the jinx by being different, brilliant and above all, geographically conscious at the same time." Syed Omar Nadeem wrote to ARY Digital, who also praised the film due to its script, direction and cast. Rahul Aijaz of The Express Tribune rated the film 3.5 out of 5 stars and said, "Let the not-so-"Jawan" heroes teach you the meaning of "Jawani" in this hilarious sequel" but also criticised some humour and said that this "problem should be addressed" that "Pakistani film-makers rely too much on cross-dressing, fat shaming and jokes about transgenders." Hamna Zubair of Dawn Images praised most of the film and said that also being an "absurd", the film "is a cohesive, well-structured cinematic experience", however, she also criticized the bad jokes and short time-space for female characters. Saman Shafiq of Pakistan Today also praised the film throughout, calling for script, visuals and "all the ingredients necessary for a rom-com"; but too criticized the film length and female screen-time. Sadiq Saleem of Masala rated the film 4 out of 5 stars and said, "Overall, JPNA2 is a well-made film and you will walk out, smiling". He also praised the acting of Butt, Mustafa and Ahmed. Haider Rifaat wrote to Daily Times that it "is a testament to the hard work of filmmakers", adding the praises for Butt, Sarwat Gilani, Mustafa, "Six Sigma Plus, the writers, editors and producers".However Jawani Phir Nahi Ani2 was a big blockbuster for that year's Pakistani Film Industry

== Accolades ==
Year	Ceremony	Category	Recipient	Result	Ref
2019	18th Lux Style Awards	Best Film		Nominated	
2019	18th Lux Style Awards	Best Director	Nadeem Baig	Nominated	
2019	18th Lux Style Awards	Best Actor	Ahmad Ali Butt	Nominated	
2019	18th Lux Style Awards	Best Playback Singer	Arif Lohar	Nominated	
2019	International Pakistan Prestige Awards	Best Film (Viewers' choice)		Won	
2019	International Pakistan Prestige Awards	Best Director	Nadeem Baig	Won	
2019	International Pakistan Prestige Awards	Best Actor (Viewers' choice)	Humayun Saeed	Won	
2019	International Pakistan Prestige Awards	Best Actress Jury	Kubra Khan	Won	
2019	International Pakistan Prestige Awards	Best Supporting Actor (Viewers' choice)	Ahmad Ali Butt	Won	

== Soundtrack ==
Jawani Phir Nahi Ani 2

Soundtrack album by various artists
- Released: 25 August 2018
- Genre: Feature film soundtrack
- Length: 19:46
- Languages: Urdu; Punjabi
- Label: Sony BMG Music Entertainment

ARY Films chronology
Azaadi (2018)	Jawani Phir Nahi Ani 2 (2018)
External audio
- Audio jukebox on YouTube
- Album on SoundCloud

No.	Title	Lyrics	Music	Singer(s)	Length
1.	"Aya Lariye" (traditional)	Shuja Haider	Shuja Haider	Aima Baig, Shuja Haider, Naeem Abbas Rufi	4:41
2.	"Lahore Terey Tay"	Zartash Rajput	SomeWhatSuper	Waqar Ehsin, Mehak Ali	3:45
3.	"Ishq Hoa Jo Tari"	Shakeel Sohail	Sahir Ali Bagga	Momina Mustehsan	3:32
4.	"Tillay Wali Jooti" (Theme Song)	Ahmed Ali Butt	Hasil Kuraishi	Ahmad Ali Butt, Arif Lohar	3:47
5.	"Behka Re"	Shakeel Sohail	Shiraz Uppal	Shiraz Uppal	4:08
Total length:					19:46

== Sequel ==
In January 2019, Saeed confirmed that the script for the third installment is in development. In June 2025 after the success of Love Guru, Saeed confirmed that shooting for the film will begin in November 2025 and will release in 2026. Due to productions delays, filming started in September 2026 with a release date of Eid-Ul-Adha 2027.

== See also ==
- List of Pakistani films of 2018
