= Omer Shahzad =

Pakistani Model, Actor and Singer born and raised in Karachi, Pakistan

- Born: 14 December 1987 (age 38)
- Occupations: Model, actor, singer
- Years active: 2011–present
- Height: 1.89 m (6 ft 2 1/2 in)

Omer Shahzad is a Pakistani model, actor and singer who started his career in 2011, and has since established himself as one of the country's top models and actors. He has been nominated for several awards with three consecutive Best Model Male nominations at Hum Awards and four consecutive nominations at Lux Style awards.

He marked his screen debut in 2013 with Geo TV's drama series Adhoori Aurat in a negative role and went to work in Choti Choti Khushiyan (2014), Chor Darwazay (2014) and hit-drama series Noor Jahan (2015) as well Mere Humsafar (2022) in a negative role. He also marked his film debut in 2016 film Teri Meri Love Story.

== Career ==
=== Modeling ===
Omer started his career in 2011 with modeling, when Vaneeza Ahmed had auditioned him for Bridal Couture Week, he was one of the few ones who were selected among 200 auditionees, he recalled, "There were 200 boys and girls at the audition and I was one of the eight male models selected. Then I made an appearance in Noor's morning show on Hum TV." He achieved mainstream success when worked with a fashion coordinator for a shoot, Omer said, "It is only after you get published in a fashion publication as a model that they finally recognise you as an entity,". He then worked with Deepak Perwani, Sania Maskatiya, HSY, Zainab Chottani, Fahad Hussayn, and Zaheer Abbas, that earned him widespread acclaim and recognition.

=== Acting ===
He marked his television debut in 2013, with drama series Adhoori Aurat, he stated, "I always wanted to be an actor after watching Faisal Qureshi and Noman Ijaz in TV plays. But you have to start somewhere and modelling happened first for me," he played a negative role in that drama series. Omer starred in three further drama series Choti Choti Khushiyan, Chor Darwazay and Noor Jahan (2015) before entering into film industry.

He debuted in film industry in 2015 and is to star in upcoming 2016 romantic-comedy film Teri Meri Love Story directed by Jawad Bashir. In that movie he plays the role of Ramis, opposite Ushna Shah, Mohib Mirza and Mohsin Abbas Haider.

In 2017 he starred in the hit drama Alif Allah Aur Insaan as one of the leads where he plays the character of Shaheer.

Omer Shahzad next starred in one of the most highly anticipated Pakistani movies of 2018 Jawani Phir Nahi Ani 2, where he was seen playing the role of the main antagonist.

=== Music ===
Saying that he would have been a singer if not a model, in 2018 he said that he'd launch his professional music career soon.

In 2022, for the second season of the television music show Kashmir Beats, he co-sung Yar Nu Meray with Ayesha Omar. The same year he released his first solo single, Akhiyaan, for Crystal Records.

== Filmography ==
Key
†	Denotes films / drama that are currently on cinema / on air

†	Denotes film / drama that has not released yet

=== Films ===
Year	Film	Role	Director	Notes	Ref.
2016	Teri Meri Love Story	Ramis	Jawad Bashir	Leading role; debut film	
2018	Azaadi	Raj	Imran Malik	Cameo	
2018	Jawani Phir Nahi Ani 2	Nawab Sher Ali Khan	Nadeem Baig	Supporting role	

=== Television ===
Year	Title	Role	Channel	Notes
2013	Adhoori Aurat	Umair	Geo TV	Negative role; acting debut
2013	Mann Ke Moti	Tabish	Geo TV	
2013	Mere Hamrahi	Zaheer	ARY Digital	
2014	Choti Choti Khushiyan	Arham	Geo TV	
2014	Chor Darwazay		Express TV	
2014	Bahu Begam	Laiq	ARY Zindagi	
2014	Bay Gunanah		ARY Zindagi	
2015	Noor Jahan	Zaheer Ahmed	Geo TV	
2015	Anaya Tumhari Hui	Jawad	Geo TV	
2015	Saas Bahu	Waqar	Geo TV	
2016	Khwab Sab Dhool Huwey		PTV Home	
2017	Natak	Shehroze	Hum TV	
2017	Alif Allah Aur Insaan	Shaheer	Hum TV	
2018	Rasmein		PTV Home	
2018	Be Rehem	Rehan	Geo TV	
2019	Gustakh Dil	Saif	Express TV	
2019	Gul-o-Gulzar	Adil	ARY Digital	
2020	Tasveer	Shehzad	Play Entertainment	
2020	Bharaas	Hassan	ARY Digital	
2021	Ajnabi Humsafar	Fawad	Sab TV	
2021	Mere Humsafar	Khurram	ARY Digital	Negative role
2022	Hum Tum	Sarim	Hum TV	
2022	Woh Pagal Si	Wahaj	ARY Digital	
2022	Bikhray Hain Hum	Tabish	Hum TV	
2023	Bewafa	Khalid	Aan TV	
2023	Daurr	Umer Hashmi	Green Entertainment	
2023	Fitna	Arez	Hum TV	
2023	Rang Badlay Zindagi	Saif	Hum TV	
2024	Shehzadi House	Ammar	Green Entertainment	
2024	Bharam	Saalar	ARY Digital	
2025	Mohalla	Asad	Express Entertainment	

== Discography ==
- Akhiyaan (2022)

== Awards and nominations ==
Year	Award	Category	Result	Ref.
2014	2nd Hum Awards	Best Model Male	Nominated	
2015	3rd Hum Awards	Best Model Male	Nominated	
2016	4th Hum Awards	Best Model Male	Nominated	
2018	17th Lux Style Awards	Best Model Male	Nominated	
