= Uzma Khan =

Pakistani actress

- Born: 28 February 1987 (age 39); Lahore, Punjab, Pakistan
- Occupations: Actress, model

Uzma Khan (Urdu: عظمیٰ خان; born 28 February 1987) is a Pakistani film actress. She started her career with the movie The Dusk (2011) and later appeared in the film Waar (2013), Yalghaar and Jawani Phir Nahi Ani (both 2015) and Jawani Phir Nahi Ani 2 (2018). She played the role of the character Mujtuba's wife in Waar.

== Controversy ==
On 28 May 2020, a video of Khan appeared online where she was seen physically assaulted by real estate developer Malik Riaz's daughters Amber Malik and Pashmina Malik. The assault was over Uzma's alleged affair with Amna Malik's husband named Usman Malik. Amber, Pashmina and their guards stormed into Khan's house, beat and harassed Khan along with throwing decorative items at Khan and her sister.

The viral video revealed Malik Riaz daughter entered the house of actress Uzma khan with her guards and sexually threatened her, In addition, the woman is heard instigating the guards that came with her to 'touch' Khan, in a way inciting sexual violence against her.

The incident was heavily criticized by netizens and prominent media personalities and justice for Uzma Khan started trending on twitter. FIR against Amna Malik, Amber Malik and Pashmina Malik has been registered. On 3 June 2020, Malik Riaz father of Amna Malik sues Uzma Khan for 5 billion rupees for defaming him over scandal.

On 2 June 2020, the news sparked on Social Media that Uzma Khan withdrew the case. Her lawyer Khadija disassociate herself from Uzma's case after she told BBC about settlement between both parties. The sister of Huma Khan confirmed this news that we are taking the case (FIR) back and Amna Malik didn't harm us and it was a case of misunderstanding, a copy of legal statement of Huma Khan has been published in news.

== Filmography ==
Year	Title	Role	Director	Notes
2011	The Dusk	Fatima	Zeeshan Kazmi	
2013	Waar	Mujtaba's wife	Bilal Lashari	
2015	Jawani Phir Nahi Ani	Lubna	Nadeem Beyg	
2015	Teri Meri Love Story	Mona	Jawad Bashir	
2017	Yalghaar	Capt. Samiya	Hassan Rana	
2018	Jawani Phir Nahi Ani 2	Lubna	Nadeem Baig	

== Television ==
- Adhi Gawahi (2017) as Soha
- Kaisi Aurat Hoon Main (2018) as Sara Hamdan
