= White Corolla case =

2009 Pakistani rape case

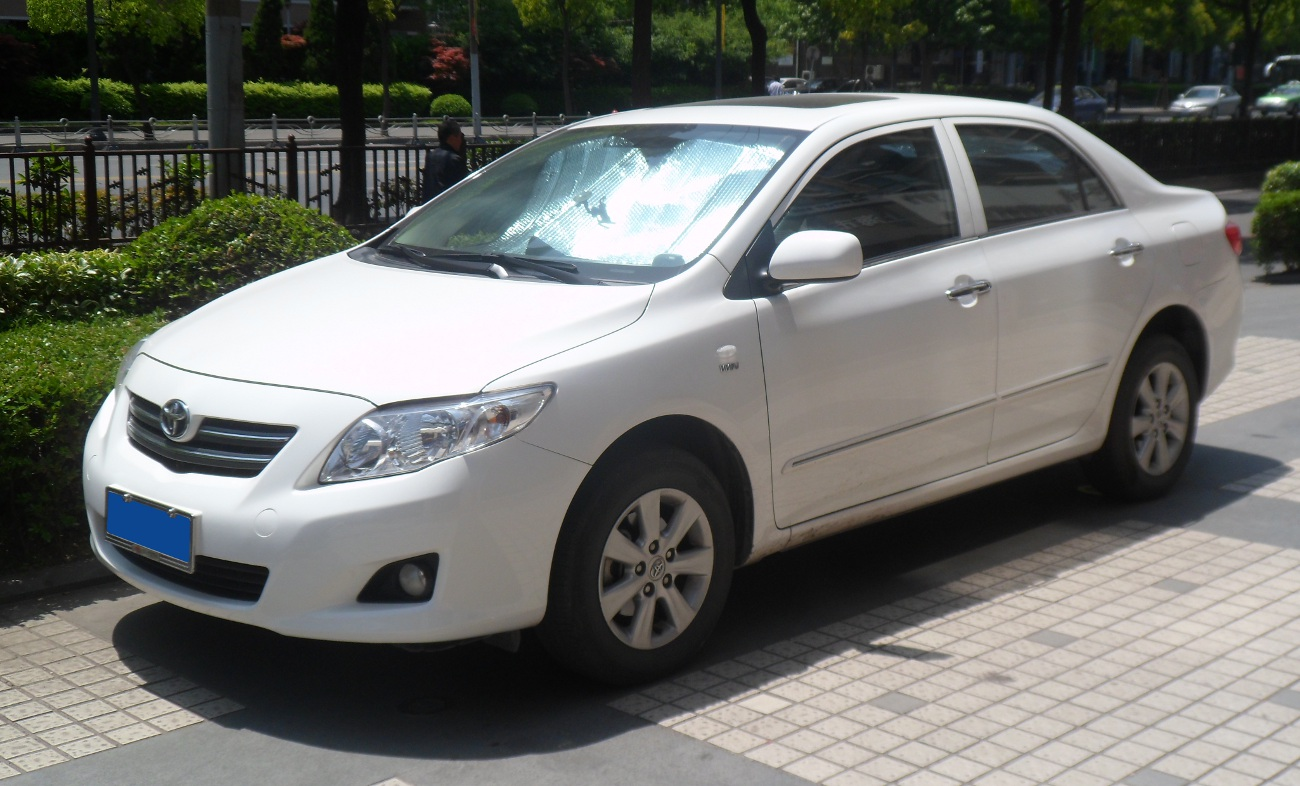
A white Toyota Corolla, which was present at all scenes of robbery and crime.

Ali Mohammed Hajyano (Sindhi: علی محمد ہجیانو) is a suspect in what has been known as the "White Corolla Case" in Karachi, Sindh, Pakistan.

== Background ==
Hajyano, a native Karachiite (Note: or Karachiwal in local vernacular speech, -wal being a common Hindustani suffix meaning "person belonging to") had previously been arrested wearing an army officers uniform (it is a crime in Pakistan to impersonate a military officer). He had been having an affair with a married woman and had claimed to be an army officer to her. He was later released on bail and went to Saudi Arabia.

== Cover story of White Corolla case ==
The statements of Ali Mohammed Hajyano, accused in 32 FIRs of various crimes including murder, dacoity, burglary and sexual abuse, have left police officials startled over the viciousness of his crimes.

Policemen investigating what is known as the White Corolla car case, because this was the automobile that was used in most of the crimes, are startled by the manner and brazenness with which these crimes were committed allegedly by Hajyano, officials said.

Hajyano not only robbed several families and couples but in many instances abused the women present at the scene of the crime.

Investigators probing Mohammed Ali Hajyano said that there were about a total of 32 FIRs registered against the accused persons at various police stations of Clifton. Twelve cases were registered against them after their arrest.

Murder case: They have also been arrested in a murder case committed in the jurisdiction of the Boat Basin police station. Hajyano has been identified in more than 10 cases so far. In many other cases, victims are afraid to come forward owing to the brutality of the crimes.

In a statement given to investigators, Hajyano said that he was a resident of Defense society, was born in Karachi and had studied till Intermediate. He is married and his wife is a doctor, and he has one son.

Moreover, he further disclosed that about two years before he had had an affair with a woman to whom he claimed he was an army officer. He was arrested by the Darakhshan police at the time while wearing an army uniform but was later bailed out. Following this incident, Hajyano went to Saudi Arabia but returned within a year. On his return, he decided to turn to robberies and crime. He met with a man called Umair Khan, a mechanic by profession.

For their crimes, they selected a white Corolla car which Umair hired from a shop in DHA. According to the statement, in March 2008, the men were roaming in Defense and hijacked a couple in a Baleno car and at gunpoint robbed cash and jewelry and assaulted the man and threatened him.

After three days, Hajyano and his accomplice again rented a Corolla and this time robbed a girl along with her mother but did not assault them. In this crime, they adopted the idea of wearing wigs and hats to protect their identity. This disguise continued.

Soon after, however, the crimes turned vicious when the duo trapped a couple outside a fast food chain in Defense society and robbed them. This time, Hajyano sexually abused the man's wife, according to the statement that he gave investigators.

Moreover, using the same white car, they hijacked two girls along with their car in Phase 2, DHA and snatched their purses and jewellery and fled.

Two days later he again used his white Corolla, changed its original number plate, and robbed three cars with couples and looted cash and jewellery.

In the third incident, they robbed a young woman who was driving alone in her car at Khayaban-e-Ittehad. The two men forced their way into the girl's car, looted cash and jewellery and then Hajyano sexually abused her, according to the statement.

Two days after this offense, they went to the Sea View area and forced a woman driving a Cultus car to stop and kidnapped her. They then sexually abused this woman, investigators quoted Hajyano as saying.

Robbery spree: After a few days, he, along with Umair, went to DHA after changing the car's number plate again. They then moved towards the Marina Club. Here they saw a couple sitting in a car. They snatched the couple's purses, jewellery and cellphones. On the same day, they also robbed another couple at Sea View and also snatched their laptop computer and a gold chain.

On the same day, in the Sea View area they stopped a car in which three women were sitting and looted gold bangles and chains and fled. Later that night, they had robbed a couple with children sitting in their jeep behind the Misri Shah Shrine in Defence.

Three days after this offence, the duo again went to Sea View, where they saw a couple sitting inside a car. In this instance, they forced the man into the Corolla at gunpoint and then proceeded to abuse the woman. Not content with this act, they then committed another robbery soon after, investigators said.

Hajyano's detailed statements make chilling reading. A couple of days after their night of repeated crimes, they went to Defense and while driving saw a couple along with their children in a car. The two criminals stopped the car and looted the family.

On the same night, a short distance from the place, they robbed two aged women sitting in their car. They then saw two men and a girl in a Mercedes car, and robbed them too.

In his detailed statement, Hajyano said that two days later, he along with Umair went to Defense after changing the number plate of the car and stopped a car in DHA, Phase-VII and robbed a couple and fled.

On the same night, they went to Phase-II and looted two girls returning from their tuition center and also snatched two laptop computers before fleeing. On the next day, in the same area, he stopped a car in which a girl was sitting and sexually abused her.

Two days later, in Darakhshan area, Hajyano signaled a car to stop. When the driver did not comply, Hajyano shot at the car. He then robbed the occupants. Nearby he saw a white Corolla car in which a woman was sitting. Hajyano forcibly entered the car and assaulted the woman.

Murder of Eunuch: In September 2008, the duo shot a eunuch. Mistaking him for a girl, they approached and pointed a pistol at him. On seeing the pistol, the eunuch fled but Hajyano opened fire, which led to the eunuch's death.

In a statement given to investigators, Hajyano said that in every sexual abuse case, he committed the offence and his accomplice, Umair, had no interest. Umair's duty was to change the number plate of the car. He would do this by removing the number plates of cars in parking lots and affixing them to his car.

The robbed jewellery was sold by Hajyano when he went to Sarafa Bazaar, Saddar, in a Mercedes car.

Hajyano's luck finally ran out, however, when he was robbing a girl in front of the Nisar Shaheed Park, when a police mobile van caught him after an encounter.

Women rights groups have called for exemplary punishment for Hajyano while his father contends that Hajyano is innocent and is being tortured by the police.

== Capture ==
The case was given great media attention in Pakistan and Hajyano was arrested in early February 2009.
