= Rehmat Ajmal =

Pakistani model

- Born: 24 October 1993 (age 32); Lahore, Punjab, Pakistan
- Occupations: Actress, model
- Years active: 2018–present

Rehmat Ajmal (born 24 October 1993) is a Pakistani model, and textile designer. She is the founder of Rehstore, an online retail store. In 2019, she played the role of Aisha (Mehwish's friend) in Nadeem Baig's Mere Paas Tum Ho.

== Early life and education ==
Ajmal was born and raised in Lahore, Pakistan, and is the youngest of three sisters. After completing her A-level, Rehmat pursued her education from the National College of Arts (NCA) in Lahore, and graduated with a degree in textile designing in 2018. She graduated NCA with a distinction and topped in her department.

== Career ==
Ajmal made her way into modelling after being approached by a teacher during her second-year at NCA. From there, she began getting featured in ad campaigns of different brands. By the time she had reached her final year at college, Ajmal had been doing international campaigns and shoots.

Apart from her modelling career, Rehmat is also building her acting portfolio. She has featured as the lead in two of Pakistani musician Ali Sethi's music videos: "Dil Lagaayein" and "Dil ki Khair". She is also starring in an upcoming drama by Nadeem Baig, and is about to act in a theater play due to be showcased by the end of September 2019.

Ajmal has spoken multiple times about her passion for acting, and has expressed interest in doing both commercial and art cinema projects.

Ajmal is also the founder of Rehstore, an online clothing and décor brand. She has said the Rehstore project is important to her, as a textile designer. Ajmal has said the brand provides designs for a niche target market. Pakistani actress Mahira Khan has appreciated Ajmal's work, and took to social media to praise her hand painted sari designs.

=== Activism ===
Ajmal is an outspoken supporter of women's rights and has expressed support of the #MeToo movement. In March 2019, Ajmal supported Pakistani model Eman Suleman's withdrawal of her nomination from the Lux Style Awards, for including an artist accused of sexual harassment. Ajmal took to social media to call upon people from the entertainment industry to support victims of sexual harassment.

In July 2019, when YouTuber Ukhano was accused of harassment, Ajmal took to social media to speak against his actions and misuse of fame.

Ajmal has also spoken about the stereotypes around modelling and the struggle of pursuing a career that has a stigmas attached to it. Speaking about encountering trolls on social media, Ajmal has raised the importance of 'creating healthy boundaries for yourself. She has also spoken up on the importance of using social media to create awareness around social issues.

== Filmography ==
Year	Title	Role	Notes
2018	Jawani Phir Nahi Aani 2	Tipu Shaj's fan	Cameo
2019	Meray Paas Tum Ho	Aisha; Danish and Mehwish's friend	TV series, aired on ARY Digital
