= Teri Meri Love Story =

Pakistani romantic comedy action film

- Theatrical release poster
- Directed by: Jawad Bashir
- Written by: Jawad Bashir; Ahmed Abdul Rehman
- Produced by: Summit Entertainment; Muhammad Ehtisham
- Starring: Mohib Mirza; Ushna Shah; Omer Shahzad; Uzma Khan; Mohsin Abbas Haider; Ahmed Abdul Rehman; Salman Shahid; Laila Zuberi; Jawad Bashir; Faisal Qureshi
- Cinematography: Farhan Golden
- Music by: Afzal Hussain; Ahsan Pervaiz
- Production company: Summit Entertainment
- Distributed by: Summit Entertainment
- Release date: 2 September 2016 (Pakistan)
- Running time: 165 minutes
- Country: Pakistan
- Language: Urdu
- Box office: Rs. 0.60 crore (US$21,000)

Teri Meri Love Story (or TMLS for short) is a 2016 Pakistani romantic-comedy, action film directed by Jawad Bashir. It is co-written by Jawad Bashir and Ahmed Abdul Rehman and co-produced and distributed by Summit Entertainment, and Hum Films. The film has Mohib Mirza, Ushna Shah, Omar Shahzad, Uzma Khan, Mohsin Abbas Haider and Salman Shahid in lead roles.

== Plot ==
The film's plot resolves around Esha (Ushna Shah), a beautiful, stylish TV host who is on an adventurous shooting assignment accompanied by her shooting crew and friends, the goofy and mischievous Sherry (Mohsin Abbas), Uzma Khan and Danish (Ahmad Abdul Rehman). Esha wants to marry her true love Ramis (Omer Shahzad) but her father (Salman Shahid) is adamant that she marries her childhood family friend Nael (Mohib Mirza). TMLS follows the trio's adventurous and hilarious journey to finding true love.

== Cast ==
- Mohib Mirza as Nael
- Ushna Shah as Esha
- Omar Shahzad as Ramis
- Uzma Khan as Mona
- Mohsin Abbas Haider as Sherry
- Salman Shahid as Rana Saheb
- Laila Zuberi as Baby Aunty
- Ahmed Abdul Rehman as Danis
- Ahsan Rahim as Don Goga
- Jawad Bashir as Don Bali
- Faisal Qureshi as Don Raju
- Hassan Khan as Gulfam

== Production ==
=== Filming ===
Jawad Bashir confirmed to the press that the film's shooting was done by using aerial lens and anamorphic tools, which is a first for a Pakistani film. The film was shot against the breathtaking backdrops of Naran Valley & lake Saif-ul-Muluq. While Mr. Waryyam Iqbal of Summit Entertainment stated that his company was committed in promoting a softer image of Pakistan by producing such movie ventures which would promote young talent.

== Release ==
The trailer was released on 22 July 2016. The film was released on 2 September 2016 in cinemas across Pakistan.

=== Box office ===
The film struggled at the Box Office and managed to collect only 85,00,00 (85 Lac) Rupees domestically.

== See also ==
- List of Pakistani films of 2016
