= Masjid-e-Tooba =

Mosque in Karachi, Pakistan

- مسجدِ طوبٰی
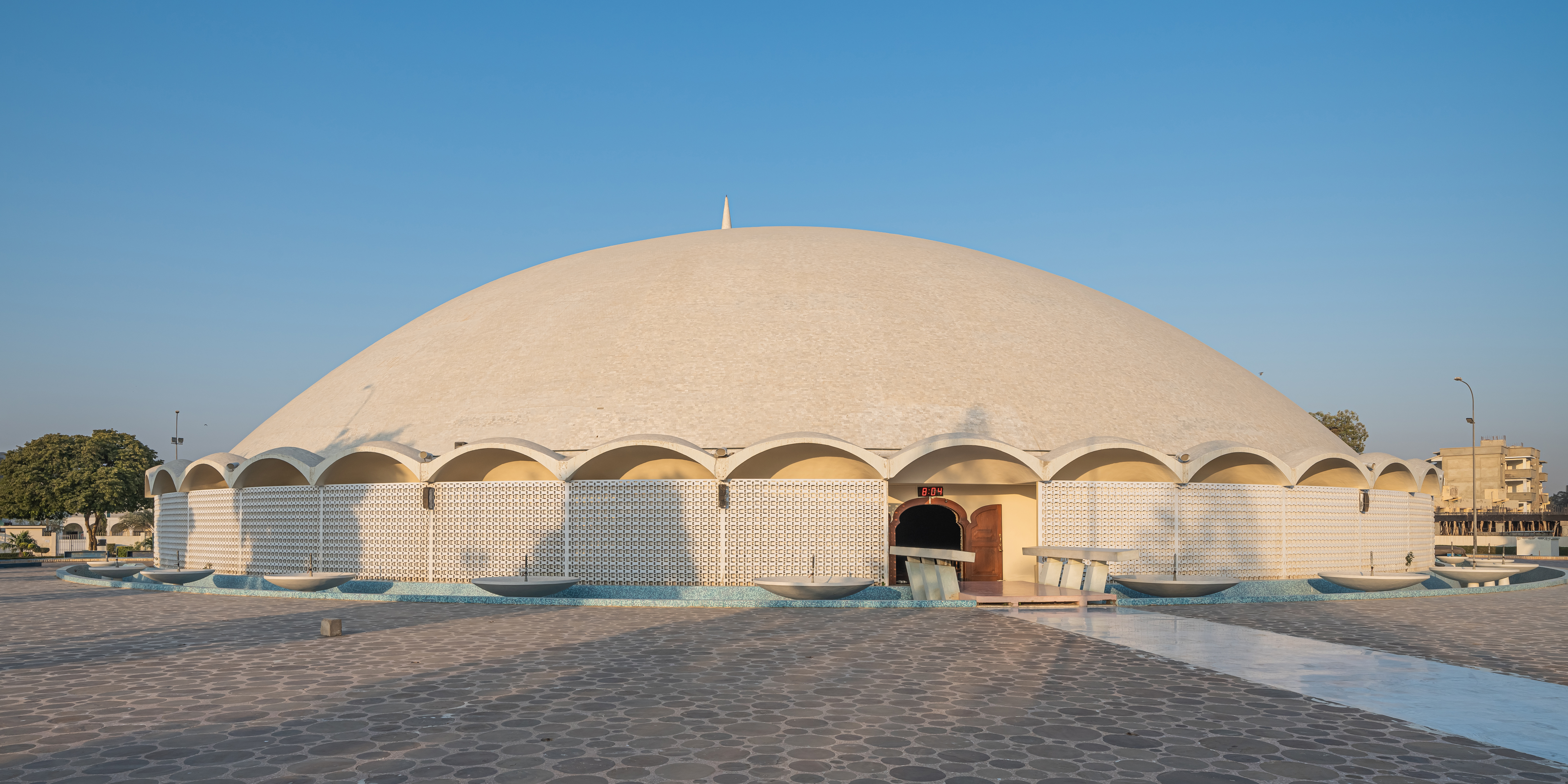

Religion
- Affiliation: Islam
- Ecclesiastical or organisational status: Mosque

Location
- Location: Old Korangi Road, Karachi Cantonment, Karachi, Sindh
- Country: Pakistan
- Interactive map of Masjid-e-Tooba
- Coordinates: 24°50.581′N 67°03.267′E

Architecture
- Architect: Babar Hameed Chauhan
- Type: Mosque
- Style: Midcentury modern
- Groundbreaking: 1966
- Completed: 1969

Specifications
- Capacity: 5,000
- Dome: 1
- Dome dia. (outer): 212 feet (65 m)
- Minaret: 1
- Minaret height: 120 feet (37 m)
- Materials: White Marble and Onyx with inlaid mirror pieces

Masjid-e-Tooba (Urdu: مسجد طوبٰی) also known as Gol Masjid (lit. 'Round Mosque'), is a mosque located in the city of Karachi in Sindh province of Pakistan. It is situated near the main Korangi Road in Phase II of the Defence Housing Authority, Karachi.

== Construction ==
The construction of the mosque began in 1966. It took three years and was completed in 1969. The mosque was designed by Pakistani architect Babar Hameed Chauhan and the structural engineer for the project was Zaheer Haider Naqvi. The mosque has the capacity to hold up to 5,000 people. It has a praying hall under the wider dome without any pillar or column. The dome has a diameter of 65 metres (212 ft). The mosque is built over a total area of 4,657 square metres (5,570 sq yd). It has single minaret with a height of 37 metres (120 ft).

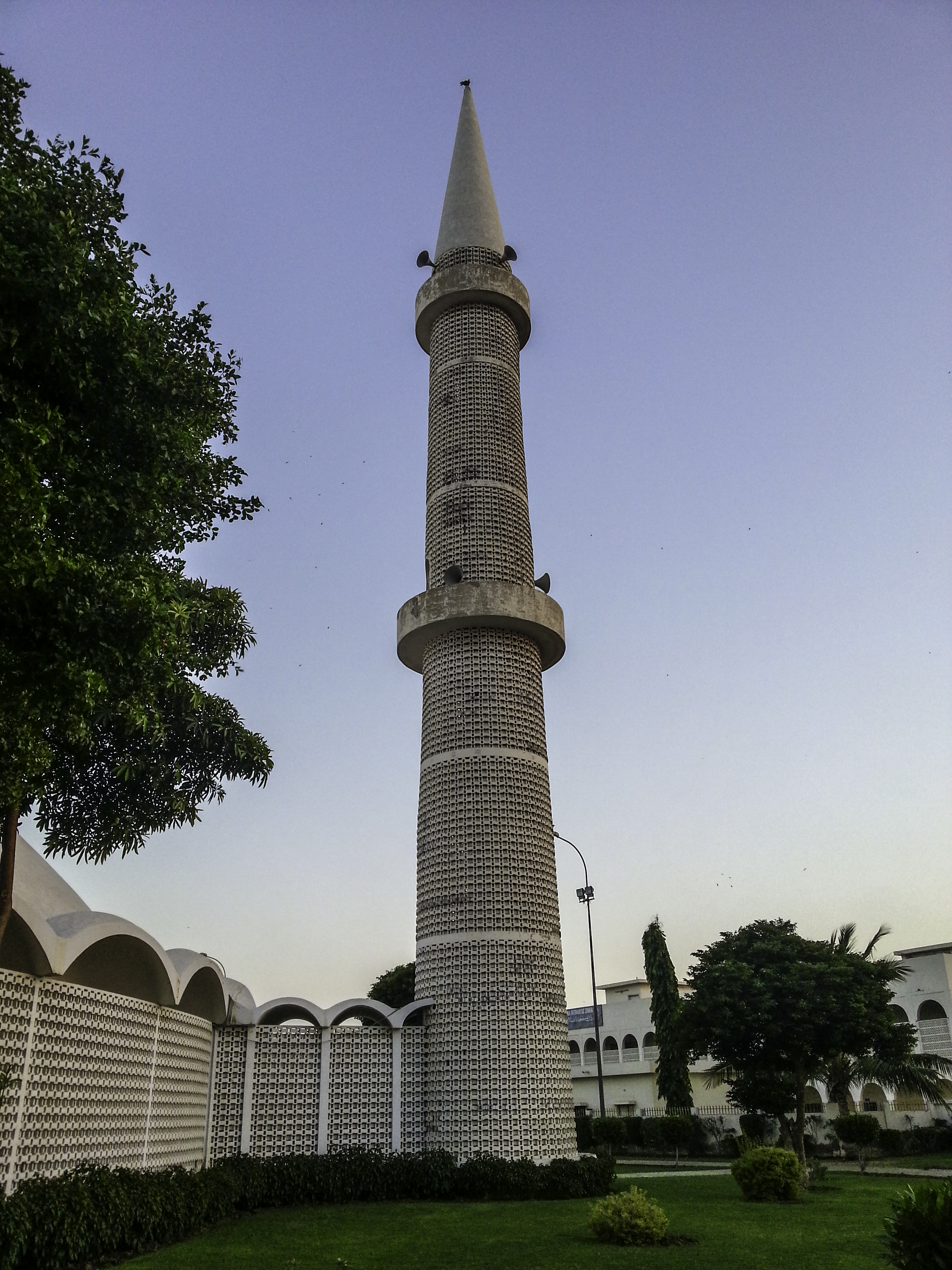
The minaret of the mosque standing behind the dome

The mosque is considered to be the largest single-dome mosque in the world with no pillars in its central prayer hall. Its huge dome is supported on a low surrounding wall.

== See also ==
- List of mosques in Pakistan
- List of largest mosques in the world
