= Darakhshan =

Derakhshan (Urdu: درخشان) is one of the neighbourhoods of DHA in Karachi, Sindh, Pakistan.

There are several ethnic groups in Darakhshan including Muhajirs, Sindhis, Punjabis, Kashmiris, Seraikis, Pakhtuns, Balochis, Memons, Bohras, Ismailis, etc.
