= Adhoori Aurat =

2013 Pakistani TV series

- Title screen
- Genre: Drama
- Written by: Samina Ejaz
- Directed by: Furqan Khan
- Starring: Ayeza Khan; Faisal Qureshi; Naima Khan
- Country of origin: Pakistan
- Original language: Urdu
- No. of seasons: 1
- No. of episodes: 27

Production
- Running time: 35-45 minutes

Original release
- Network: Geo Entertainment
- Release: 16 April – 22 October 2013

Adhoori Aurat (Urdu: ادھوری عورت, lit. 'An Incomplete Woman') is a Pakistani drama serial that aired on Geo Entertainment. It was released on 16 April 2013, directed by Furqan Khan and written by Samina Ejaz. The serial features Faisal Qureshi, Ayeza Khan and Maheen Rizvi in lead roles.

== Cast ==
- Faisal Qureshi as Zayan Ahmed
- Ayeza Khan as Maryam Aftab
- Maheen Rizvi as Faiza
- Kaif Ghaznavi as Afshan
- Tahira Imam as Nusrat
- Minal Khan as Arshiya
- Anwar Iqbal as Prof. Aftab
- Naima Khan as Tasneem
- Bilal Qureshi
- Aamir Qureshi as Afshan's husband
- Omer Shahzad
- Anum Aqeel
- Mumtaz Kanwal

== Reception ==
The serial was very popular with the audience and high in TRPs throughout its airing. Its average TRP is 4.5, which is high, as TRPs used to be low in 2013 and before summers, due to intense electricity load shedding. All the actors were critically acclaimed for their performances. Faisal Qureshi and Ayeza Khan's performances as the antagonist and protagonist, respectively, were critically acclaimed.

=== Awards and nominations ===
Year	Award	Category	Recipient(s)	Result	Ref(s).
11 January 2014	4th Pakistan Media Awards	Best Drama Serial	Adhoori Aurat	Nominated	
11 January 2014	4th Pakistan Media Awards	Best Drama Actor	Faysal Qureshi	Won	
