= Meray Paas Tum Ho =

2019 Pakistani romantic television series

- میرے پاس تم ہو
- Genre: Melodrama; Romance
- Written by: Khalil-ur-Rehman Qamar
- Directed by: Nadeem Baig
- Creative director: Taimoor Gandul
- Starring: Humayun Saeed; Ayeza Khan; Adnan Siddiqui
- Theme music composer: Naveed Nashad
- Opening theme: "Mera Yeh Bharam Tha Meray Paas Tum Ho" by Rahat Fateh Ali Khan
- Ending theme: "Mera Yeh Bharam Tha Meray Paas Tum Ho" by Rahat Fateh Ali Khan
- Composer: Naveed Nashad
- Country of origin: Pakistan
- Original language: Urdu
- No. of seasons: 1
- No. of episodes: 23 (List of episodes)

Production
- Executive producer: Samina Humayun Saeed
- Producers: Humayun Saeed; Shahzad Nasib
- Production locations: Karachi, Sindh, Pakistan
- Editor: Khawaja Arif
- Camera setup: Multi-camera setup 1080p
- Running time: 35–40 minutes
- Production company: Six Sigma Plus

Original release
- Network: ARY Digital
- Release: 17 August 2019 – 25 January 2020

Meray Paas Tum Ho (Urdu: میرے پاس تم ہو; transl. I have you) is a 2019 Pakistani romantic melodrama series produced by Humayun Saeed and Shahzad Nasib under their production banner Six Sigma Plus. Directed by Nadeem Baig and written by Khalil-ur-Rehman Qamar, the show starred Humayun Saeed, Ayeza Khan, and Adnan Siddiqui as leads. The show originally aired on ARY Digital from 17 August 2019 to 25 January 2020. It is also digitally available on YouTube and the ARY Zap App.

At the 19th Lux Style Awards, it received eight nominations, winning in two categories, including Best TV Play.

== Plot ==
Danish is a simple man with the moral values of idealized Pakistani culture. He works as a government officer. His whole world revolves around his wife Mehwish and son Roomi. Mehwish is a faithful housewife, but she has big ambitions that her husband is not able to fulfill on his monthly salary. She has expensive taste and desires to be seen as equal with her old but rich friend, Anushey. Subsequently, Mehwish and Danish are invited to Anushey's brother's wedding, where she is bewitched by Shehwar, a rich businessman. This eventually develops into an extramarital relationship due to his gaslighting, flattery, and mesmerization by his wealth. He even offers Mehwish a high-position job in his office with a very high salary and added perks. Mehwish's son and husband disapprove of her job in his office as they suspect the extramarital relationship.

After some time, Mehwish leaves her husband and son and starts a new life with Shehwar. After almost six or seven months of a live-in relationship with Shehwar, she convinces him to marry her. On the day of their wedding, Shehwar's wife, Maham, arrives back in Pakistan. She is the sole owner of the wealth that Shehwar has under "Shehwar Chemicals." When she realizes that Shehwar was going to marry Mehwish, she slaps Mehwish tightly across the face and asks her to leave her house immediately. Subsequently, Shehwar Ahmad loses both his wealth and respect because of Maham, who has him arrested for fraud, forgery, and illegal transfer of funds. Mehwish is left all alone and is immediately kicked out of Maham's house with some cash to assist her.

When Mehwish visits Shehwar in jail, he refuses to even acknowledge her, asks her to go away from his life, and blames her for his misfortune. Mehwish has nowhere to go now because her ex-husband, Danish, sold his old flat. Using the money he received by selling his flat, he makes a bold move, invests most of it in the stock market, and becomes rich over the course of these months.

During the course of these months, Danish develops a friendly relationship with Roomi's teacher, Hania but she develops romantic feelings for Danish. She even proposes to him because she fell in love with him, but Danish does not reciprocate her feelings. Mehwish, on the other hand, contacts Danish's business partner, Salman, for help. He is also a mutual friend of theirs from college. Through him, she asks for Danish's forgiveness repeatedly and requests to meet him once. Danish sends her a message through Salman that he has forgiven her but does not want to meet her. She even attempts suicide, but Danish doesn't show any affection, nor does he turn up to meet her at the hospital. Shehwar Ahmed's jail term is broadly defused by the media.

Maham forgives Shehwar and brings him home, but he demotes his post in the office from CEO to minor executive. This doesn't go well with Shehwar, and he realizes all of his mistakes. It is ambiguous if he leaves Maham, or if he complies with her conditions and decides to stay (in the scene, he is shown to knock on the trunk of his car, which can either indicate the driver to get ready to leave, or to open the trunk to remove his luggage and put it back inside). On the other hand, after being prodded by Roomi and Salman, Danish agrees on meeting Mehwish once in their old flat (she buys this with the money that Maham gave her). When he meets her after a cup of tea and some small talk, he doesn't feel well and is suffocating. Upon leaving, he suffers a major heart attack due to facing her. He passes away in the hospital, and Mehwish is left all alone for the rest of her life. Even her son turns to Hania upon his father's death.

== Cast ==
=== Main ===
- Humayun Saeed as Danish Akhtar : Mehwish's ex-husband; Roomi's father; Hania's love interest.
- Ayeza Khan as Mehwish Akhtar : Danish's ex-wife; Roomi's mother; Shehwaar's ex-girlfriend.
- Adnan Siddiqui as Shehwaar Ahmed : Maham's ex-husband; Mehwish's ex-boyfriend.

=== Recurring ===
- Hira Mani as Hania Mateen Ahmed : Roomi's teacher; Danish's one sided lover.
- Shees Sajjad Gul as Roomi Akhtar : Mehwish and Danish's son.
- Mehar Bano as Anushey : Mehwish's friend
- Hina Javed as Wateera Mateen Ahmed : Hania's sister.
- Mohammad Ahmed as Mateen Ahmed : Danish's colleague; Hania & Wateera's father.
- Furqan Qureshi as Salman Ibrahim : Danish and Mehwish's friend; Aisha's husband.
- Rehmat Ajmal as Aisha Salman Ibrahim : Danish and Mehwish's friend; Salman's wife.
- Musaddiq Malik as Monty : Danish and Mehwish's neighbour.

=== Guest appearances ===
- Savera Nadeem as Maham Sayyad : Shehwaar's ex-wife.
- Shamim Hilaly as Roomi's school principal
- Anoushay Abbasi as Ifra : Monty's wife
- Waseem Lashari as Anti-corruption officer
- Sheikh Arsalan Anwer as Hotel Manager

== Episodes ==
No.	Title	Directed by	Written by	Original release date
1	"Mere Paas Tum Ho Episode 1"	Nadeem Baig	Khalil-ur-Rehman Qamar	17 August 2019
Danish, Mehwish, and Roomi enjoy a day at the beach. They discuss their day-to-day lives while also discussing finances. On the way home, Mehwish shows Danish an expensive necklace she wants to buy, which Danish cannot afford. Danish feels worthless and bad because he isn't able to give his wife the luxurious life she wants to live. He questions going against his morals and earning illegally through his government job to make ends meet. By the end of the episode, he makes this moral compromise to make his wife happy. Episodic reference:
2	"Mere Paas Tum Ho Episode 2"	Nadeem Baig	Khalil-ur-Rehman Qamar	24 August 2019
After being upset at Danish's inability to buy her a necklace, Mehwish goes shopping with her friend Anushey for her brother's wedding. She finds the same necklace while shopping with Anushey and asks her for a loan to buy it. She meets Shehwar Ahmed (a friend of Anushey) who gushes her with compliments. Danish is upset at seeing the necklace because he also bought it from his new earned money but now would have to return it. Danish and Mehwish attend Anushey's brother's Mehendi. Episodic reference:
3	"Mere Paas Tum Ho Episode 3"	Nadeem Baig	Khalil-ur-Rehman Qamar	31 August 2019
On the dance floor, Danish dances with Anushey (platonically). Shehwar offers to dance with Mehwish to which she first hesitates. Upon insisting, Mehwish agrees to which Danish strongly disapproves and takes the family home immediately. Her friend Anushey calls out Danish's hypocrisy while talking to Mehwish. Mehwish discovers the necklace Danish had bought for her (same as the one she had bought) and is taken aback by his kind gesture. Monty (their neighbor) offers Mehwish a ride in his car when she goes out. She's very hesitant, but eventually agrees to Monty's insistent offer. She tells Danish and he greatly disapproves. Danish and Monty have a physical altercation when he comes home as Danish doesn't trust his neighbor's intentions. Episodic reference:
4	"Mere Paas Tum Ho Episode 4"	Nadeem Baig	Khalil-ur-Rehman Qamar	7 September 2019
Mehwish apologizes for her stupidity in going with Monty after it is revealed that he lied to Danish. Mehwish and Roomi attend the wedding because Danish is hurt by his altercation. After Mehwish and Shehwar have a quick conversation, Danish suddenly shows up at the wedding. Shehwar and Danish amicably converse about their differences, and Shehwar drops them home. Shehwar invites Danish's family to dinner to which they agree. Shehwar calls Mehwish and once again, gushes her with compliments. Danish receives 10 lac rupees from Munir Sahab through bribery but feels morally torn. Mehwish convinces him to keep the money after reminding him of their financial hardships. Episodic reference:
5	"Mere Paas Tum Ho Episode 5"	Nadeem Baig	Khalil-ur-Rehman Qamar	14 September 2019
Danish offers to buy Monty's car, to which he's surprised. Monty responds by pervasively referring to Mehwish and taunting Danish about his new-earned money. Danish refuses to buy his car and leaves. Danish goes to work and returns the 10 lac rupees because the documents he has to sign do not align with his morals. He reassures Mehwish that staying hand-to-mouth is better than selling your morals. Danish and Mehwish go to Shehwar's house in his car. Shehwar cleverly pulls Mehwish aside and offers to give everything he owns to Danish, in return for her. Shehwar slyly insults Danish and says an 8-year-long marriage is more than enough. Mehwish is uncomfortable and asks him to stop. Shehwar sends the family off with gifts and gives Mehwish an extremely precious necklace. The episode ends with a symbolic scene where Danish takes off Mehwish's old necklace and put on the new one, gifted from Shehwar. Episodic reference:
6	"Mere Paas Tum Ho Episode 6"	Nadeem Baig	Khalil-ur-Rehman Qamar	21 September 2019
Mehwish and Danish discuss the dinner. Anushey and Mehwish discuss her brother's wedding. Suddenly, the bell rings, and Shehwar shows up at Mehwish's door. She's alone with Roomi and refuses to let him in. He responds that he was only here to see her so his day would go by and leaves promptly. Shehwar calls again and offers a high-salary job to Mehwish, to which she's taken aback. Mehwish promptly asks Danish if she should look for work to help with their expenses. She doesn't tell him of the job offer. Danish is upset after Mehwish asks if she should seek a job at Shehwar Chemicals because he claims that Shehwar doesn't have good intentions. He also found out that Shehwar showed up at his house and is upset that Mehwish didn't at least tell him. Episodic reference:
7	"Mere Paas Tum Ho Episode 7"	Nadeem Baig	Khalil-ur-Rehman Qamar	28 September 2019
Danish and Mehwish converse about Shehwar's job offer. Danish disapproves because Mehwish doesn't deserve a 1 lac per month salary based on her CV and position. He explains how a person only deserves the money they earn, which is also why he returned the 10 lac rupees. Mehwish is extremely upset at Danish's comments about being "bought" through gifts and bribery and a high-salary job. Mehwish and Shehwar converse about Danish's disapproval and Shehwar's intentions. Shehwar clearly states that Danish is right and that his intentions are indeed evil when it comes to Mehwish. Shehwar and Danish meet at his house (Danish went to return his gifts), where Shehwar is able to defuse the situation. Danish comes home and allows Mehwish to send her CV. Mehwish starts her job and is surprised to see no designation or task. Shehwar says that she simply has to stay by her side. Episodic reference:
8	"Mere Paas Tum Ho Episode 8"	Nadeem Baig	Khalil-ur-Rehman Qamar	5 October 2019
Episodic reference:
9	"Mere Paas Tum Ho Episode 9"	Nadeem Baig	Khalil-ur-Rehman Qamar	12 October 2019
Episodic reference:
10	"Mere Paas Tum Ho Episode 10"	Nadeem Baig	Khalil-ur-Rehman Qamar	19 October 2019
Episodic reference:
11	"Mere Paas Tum Ho Episode 11"	Nadeem Baig	Khalil-ur-Rehman Qamar	26 October 2019
Episodic reference:
12	"Mere Paas Tum Ho Episode 12"	Nadeem Baig	Khalil-ur-Rehman Qamar	2 November 2019
Episodic reference:
13	"Mere Paas Tum Ho Episode 13"	Nadeem Baig	Khalil-ur-Rehman Qamar	9 November 2019
Episodic reference:
14	"Mere Paas Tum Ho Episode 14"	Nadeem Baig	Khalil-ur-Rehman Qamar	16 November 2019
Episodic reference:
15	"Mere Paas Tum Ho Episode 15"	Nadeem Baig	Khalil-ur-Rehman Qamar	23 November 2019
Episodic reference:
16	"Mere Paas Tum Ho Episode 16"	Nadeem Baig	Khalil-ur-Rehman Qamar	30 November 2019
Episodic reference:
17	"Mere Paas Tum Ho Episode 17"	Nadeem Baig	Khalil-ur-Rehman Qamar	7 December 2019
Episodic reference:
18	"Mere Paas Tum Ho Episode 18"	Nadeem Baig	Khalil-ur-Rehman Qamar	14 December 2019
Episodic reference:
19	"Mere Paas Tum Ho Episode 19"	Nadeem Baig	Khalil-ur-Rehman Qamar	21 December 2019
Episodic reference:
20	"Mere Paas Tum Ho Episode 20"	Nadeem Baig	Khalil-ur-Rehman Qamar	28 December 2019
Episodic reference:
21	"Mere Paas Tum Ho Episode 21"	Nadeem Baig	Khalil-ur-Rehman Qamar	4 January 2020
Episodic reference:
22	"Mere Paas Tum Ho 2nd Last Episode"	Nadeem Baig	Khalil-ur-Rehman Qamar	11 January 2020
Episodic reference:
23	"Mere Paas Tum Ho Last Episode"	Nadeem Baig	Khalil-ur-Rehman Qamar	25 January 2020
Episodic reference:

== Production ==
In an interview with Dawn Images, Ayeza Khan confirmed that she's starring in the drama serial Mere Paas Tum Ho, with Humayun Saeed. In an interview Khalil-Ur-Rehman Qamar said that Sonya Hussyn, Sanam Jung and Ayeza Khan was offered for the role of Mehwish. Likewise, the role of Danish was previously offered to Feroze Khan who refused after a falling out with the writer Khalil-Ur-Rehman Qamar. A Nadeem Baig's directional, written by Khalil-Ur-Rehman Qamar and produced by Humayun Saeed and Shahzad Nasib, the duo previously worked together in 2017 blockbuster film Punjab Nahi Jaungi. On 22 November 2018 shooting started and on 17 July 2019 the shooting wrapped. On being asked why he choose this drama Saeed said that "this script was great and it was witref>"Meray Paas Tum Ho Episode 6 – 21st September 2019 – ARY Digital [Subtitle Eng]". YouTube. ARY Digital. 21 September 2019.h him for 3 years but he was focusing on his films so Nadeem decided to cast someone else. But Khalil became angry because he wanted Saeed to play the lead role in this drama so Saeed agreed to do this drama serial". On 31 July 2019 the first look and teaser was released. The second teaser was released on 3 August 2019.

== Reception ==
The show became one of the most popular serial of 2019 after airing its first episode in Pakistan. The show received best ever TV ratings becoming the best ever ranked drama in the history of Pakistan. Last episode of the drama was viewed by almost more than 79.6 million people in Pakistan. At the time, the show was the most viewed Pakistani television series on YouTube, but has now been dethroned by Khuda Aur Mohabbat Season 3. However, it still holds the highest TRP ratings of any Pakistani show of all time.

The Performances and Chemistry of Saeed and Khan were praised by critics. Alysha Khan of HipInPakistan wrote, "Saeed absolutely killed it with a Good Boy Avatar, and he shares great on-screen chemistry with Khan and also praised Khan's performance". Sarah Shaukat of Entertainment Pakistan wrote, "Saeed stole the show with towering performance in every scene he managed to impress with his attitude and dialogue delivery while Khan was consistent and looked really good". Laiba Sabeen of OyeYeah wrote, "The Superb Performances of Saeed, Khan, Siddiqui, and Baig's brilliant direction keeps the viewers engaged in a crisp story". Maliha Rehman of DAWN wrote, "Humayun Saeed at his very best, making his audience cry with him. Beautiful dialogues by Khalil-ur-Rehman and Nadeem Baig directing with such sensitivity". Khan was specifically praised for her subtle and nuanced performance, and was especially lauded for her transformation from a middle-class woman to a rich, businessman's lover.

=== Feminist view ===
The TV drama serial was received in Pakistan's feminist circles with skepticism & reservation. Specially the script writer got criticized for his misogynist views. Author Aisha Sarwari says drama convinces audience that it is okay to slur at and slut shame materialistic women, and this double standard is morally questionable since Pakistani society in general & bridegrooms in particular are known for dowry seeking and can not claim high moral ground vis a vis materialistic women. While actually Pakistan is known for acid attacks, domestic violence, serious levels of honor killings of women even at suggestion of freedom of choice. Sarwari says sadly depiction is falsified far from real life and one won't find even in 1000 km of South Asia any very positive, patient and giving protagonist as depicted in the drama. Sarwari believes that this kind of content trends in Pakistan since there is lack of actual better actual life characters than this in Pakistan society.

Afiya S. Zia not only criticizes the author for his sexist views but also criticizes content of family drama scripts dished out by Pakistani Television channels since last 20 years as advice literature of digest authors as writing such content which rather than questioning, normalizes & internalizes injustices to women in Pakistan in garb of piety, modesty, and religious agency preaching lessons to women to submit themselves and continue to remain subservient to a male dominated patriarchy of Pakistan. Afiya S. Zia says the TV series presentation creates a false narrative that Pakistani patriarchal family structure do take care of all family members equally, practically which is far from the truth rather Pakistani women are meted out with discrimination and violent backlash for demanding their sexual freedoms.

Khalil-ur-Rehman Qamar entered into altercations with Pakistani feminist Marvi Sirmed over slogans in Aurat March on International Women's Day including Mera Jism Meri Marzi during a television debate in March 2020.

Quite a few placards in Aurat March on International Women's Day 2020 were critical of misogyny & sexism of the author Khalil-ur-Rehman Qamar expressed through his participation in reality TV shows & drama both.

==== Controversies over dialogues and statements ====
Some of the dialogues in the TV serial and some of the later statements of Khalil-ur-Rehman Qamar invited debate controversies from liberal and feminists in social media and mainstream media both.

One of the TV serial dialogue refers to a character in the serial as "do take ki larki (second rate / worthless woman)" became famous among misogynists of Pakistan and severely criticized by feminists. Feminist Tahira Abdullah called out the wording judgmental, 'It's not for any one to judge a woman good or bad based on woman's loyalty; respect and dignity is woman's right not dependent on anyone else's willingness. Just by being a woman she deserves to be treated human born equal to not beg but claim equal rights. Women do not need men to define standards of behavior for women and categorize who is good or bad woman", referring to the famous utterance of Qamar that women by definition are modest & loyal and those who are not modest and loyal do not deserve to be called women at all. In the same debate, Qamar called himself to be "the biggest feminist". Pakistani actress Iffat Omar pointing out that the last episode of the serial poses questions over the double-standard Qamar-presented Pakistani conservative narrative that a Pakistani woman is expected and idealized for forgiving a husband's disloyalty as Maham, the wife of Shehwar Ahmad, who was involved in an extra-marital relationship, forgives him. On the other hand, lead protagonist Danish is shown to not be able to bear the extra-marital relation of his wife Mehwish but rather prefers death as sign of non-forgiving. Pakistani males' non-acceptance of spousal choices and at the same time, entitled Pakistani males expect forgiveness for their own behavior.

In other debates Khalil-ur-Rahman Qamar also made other controversial statements like: "women should gang rape men if they want equality."; "Aurat March is a conspiracy of some 35 women who belong to a specific class." Pakistani actress Iffat Omar responded back saying women do not ask equality to rape men but to redress patriarchal double standards & injustices towards fellow women.

Later, some actors of the serial preferred to distance themselves from ensuing controversies. Actress Rehmat Ajmal accepted that she stumbled a little since she was not aware enough about how the TV serial will come out on the screen, and that she necessarily does not endorse controversial views expressed by the writer Qamar. Actor Adnan Siddiqui said that he understands the dialogues had problematic leanings and he wished drama could have been more nuanced in depiction of women.

== Adaptations ==
Initial story of Indian television series Kaamnaa was inspired by Meray Paas Tum Ho.

== Awards and nominations ==
Year	Award	Category	Nominee	Result	Ref.
7 February 2020	Pakistan International Screen Awards	Best Television Play	Six Sigma Plus	Won	
7 February 2020	Pakistan International Screen Awards	Best Television Director	Nadeem Baig	Won	
7 February 2020	Pakistan International Screen Awards	Best Television Actor	Humayun Saeed	Won	
7 February 2020	Pakistan International Screen Awards	Best Television Actress	Ayeza Khan	Won	
7 February 2020	Pakistan International Screen Awards	Best Television Actor Critics choice	Adnan Siddiqui	Won	
7 February 2020	Pakistan International Screen Awards	Best Television Writer	Khalil ur Rehman Qamar	Won	
7 February 2020	Pakistan International Screen Awards	Best OST	Rahat Fateh Ali Khan	Won	
31 December 2020	LUX Style Awards	Best TV Play	Six Sigma Plus	Won	
31 December 2020	LUX Style Awards	Best Play Director	Nadeem Baig	Nominated	
31 December 2020	LUX Style Awards	Best TV Actor- Viewer's choice	Humayun Saeed	Nominated	
31 December 2020	LUX Style Awards	Best TV Actor- Critics choice	Humayun Saeed	Nominated	
31 December 2020	LUX Style Awards	Best TV Actress- Viewer's choice	Ayeza Khan	Nominated	
31 December 2020	LUX Style Awards	Best TV Actress- Critics choice	Ayeza Khan	Nominated	
31 December 2020	LUX Style Awards	Best Play Writer	Khalil ur Rehman Qamar	Nominated	
31 December 2020	LUX Style Awards	Best Emerging Talent	Shees Gul	Won	

== See also ==
- Divorce in Pakistan
