= Dil Lagi =

2016 Pakistani television series

- Title screen
- Genre: Drama; Romance; Emotional
- Written by: Faiza Iftikhar
- Directed by: Nadeem Baig
- Starring: Humayun Saeed; Mehwish Hayat
- Theme music composer: Sahir Ali Bagga
- Opening theme: "Tumhain Dil Lagi Bhool Jani Paregi by Rahat Fateh Ali Khan
- Composer: Sahir Ali Bagga
- Country of origin: Pakistan
- Original language: Urdu
- No. of seasons: 1
- No. of episodes: 25

Production
- Executive producer: Samina Humayun Saeed
- Producers: Humayun Saeed; Shahzad Nasib
- Production locations: Karachi, Sukkur
- Camera setup: Multi-camera
- Running time: 39:32 minutes
- Production company: Six Sigma Plus

Original release
- Network: ARY Digital
- Release: 5 March – 10 September 2016

Dil Lagi (Urdu: دل لگی) (English: Feelings of the Heart) is a Pakistani romantic drama television series, produced by Humayun Saeed and Shahzad Nasib under their production banner Six Sigma Plus. It is directed by Nadeem Baig and written by Faiza Iftikhar. It features Humayun Saeed and Mehwish Hayat in lead roles. The serial originally started airing on ARY Digital on 5 March 2016. The series was well received and critically acclaimed. At 16th Lux Style Awards, it received four nominations, winning an award for Best TV Play.

== Plot ==
Dillagi is a romantic story of Mohid (Humayun Saeed) and Anmol (Mehwish Hayat). It is set in the narrow back streets of Sukkur in interior Sindh, where Anmol leads a simple life with her mother and younger sister Mishal Ansari. Before he died, Anmol's father had paid off a debt he owed to local moneylender Kifayat Ali using his home as collateral, but Anmol's mother has no proof of the debt repayment, so they are an easy target for fraud. Kifayat Ali engages Mohid, who specializes in real-estate and a little ghundagardi on the side to evict Anmol's family. The clash between Mohid and Anmol is the crux of this story.

== Cast ==
=== Main cast ===
- Humayun Saeed as Mohid : Anmol's husband; Zulekha's son; Sabiha's brother.
- Mehwish Hayat as Anmol : Mohid's wife; Mishal's sister.

=== Recurring cast ===
- Saba Hameed As Zulekha : Mohid and Sabiha's mother.
- Asma Abbas as Mishal & Anmol's mother.
- Imran Ashraf as Dastagir : Mohid's assistant.
- Mirza Zain Baig as Fazal : Sabiha's husband.
- Uzma Hassan as Sabiha : Mohid's sister; Fazal's wife; Zulekha's daughter.
- Inayat Khan as Fareed : Anmol's lover.
- Mariam Ansari as Mishal : Anmol's sister.

== Episodes ==
No.	Title	Directed by	Written by	Original release date
1	"Dil Lagi Episode 1"	Nadeem Baig	Faiza Iftikhar	5 March 2016
Episodic reference:
2	"Dil Lagi Episode 2"	Nadeem Baig	Faiza Iftikhar	12 March 2016
Episodic reference:
3	"Dil Lagi Episode 3"	Nadeem Baig	Faiza Iftikhar	26 March 2016
Episodic reference:
4	"Dil Lagi Episode 4"	Nadeem Baig	Faiza Iftikhar	2 April 2016
Episodic reference:
5	"Dil Lagi Episode 5"	Nadeem Baig	Faiza Iftikhar	9 April 2016
Episodic reference:
6	"Dil Lagi Episode 6"	Nadeem Baig	Faiza Iftikhar	16 April 2016
Episodic reference:
7	"Dil Lagi Episode 7"	Nadeem Baig	Faiza Iftikhar	23 April 2016
Episodic reference:
8	"Dil Lagi Episode 8"	Nadeem Baig	Faiza Iftikhar	30 April 2016
Episodic reference:
9	"Dil Lagi Episode 9"	Nadeem Baig	Faiza Iftikhar	14 May 2016
Episodic reference:
10	"Dil Lagi Episode 10"	Nadeem Baig	Faiza Iftikhar	21 May 2016
Episodic reference:
11	"Dil Lagi Episode 11"	Nadeem Baig	Faiza Iftikhar	28 May 2016
Episodic reference:
12	"Dil Lagi Episode 12"	Nadeem Baig	Faiza Iftikhar	4 June 2016
Episodic reference:
13	"Dil Lagi Episode 13"	Nadeem Baig	Faiza Iftikhar	11 June 2016
Episodic reference:
14	"Dil Lagi Episode 14"	Nadeem Baig	Faiza Iftikhar	18 June 2016
Episodic reference:
15	"Dil Lagi Episode 15"	Nadeem Baig	Faiza Iftikhar	25 June 2016
Episodic reference:
16	"Dil Lagi Episode 16"	Nadeem Baig	Faiza Iftikhar	9 July 2016
Episodic reference:
17	"Dil Lagi Episode 17"	Nadeem Baig	Faiza Iftikhar	16 July 2016
Episodic reference:
18	"Dil Lagi Episode 18"	Nadeem Baig	Faiza Iftikhar	23 July 2016
Episodic reference:
19	"Dil Lagi Episode 19"	Nadeem Baig	Faiza Iftikhar	30 July 2016
Episodic reference:
20	"Dil Lagi Episode 20"	Nadeem Baig	Faiza Iftikhar	6 August 2016
Episodic reference:
21	"Dil Lagi Episode 21"	Nadeem Baig	Faiza Iftikhar	13 August 2016
Episodic reference:
22	"Dil Lagi Episode 22"	Nadeem Baig	Faiza Iftikhar	20 August 2016
Episodic reference:
23	"Dil Lagi Episode 23"	Nadeem Baig	Faiza Iftikhar	27 August 2016
Episodic reference:
24	"Dil Lagi Episode 24"	Nadeem Baig	Faiza Iftikhar	3 September 2016
Episodic reference:
25	"Dil Lagi Episode 25"	Nadeem Baig	Faiza Iftikhar	10 September 2016
Episodic reference:

== Production ==
Iman Ali was offered the protagonist role in the series, however she declined it due to her reluctance to work in summers.

== Broadcast and availability ==
The show was dubbed in Arabic under the title الحب المستحیل and is available as VOD on shahid.net. The show is also available on MX Player app. It was also aired on ARY Digital's sister channel ARY Zindagi.

== Reception ==
The series received acclaim due to its script, performances and strong female protagonist. The Nation praised the writing for breaking the gender stereotypes. DAWN Images praised the writing for the depiction of family values, women bonds and strong female protagonist, which was rare on television at that time. The misogynistic elements of the plotline were however criticized.

== Awards and nominations ==
=== Lux Style Awards ===
Year	Awards	Category	Nominee/ Receipt	Result	Ref.
2017	Lux Style Awards	Best TV Play	Six Sigma Plus	Won	
2017	Lux Style Awards	Best Television Director	Nadeem Beyg	Nominated	
2017	Lux Style Awards	Best Television Actor	Humayun Saeed	Nominated	
2017	Lux Style Awards	Best Television Actress	Mehwish Hayat	Nominated	
2017	Lux Style Awards	Best Television Writer	Faiza Iftikhar	Nominated	

=== International Pakistan Prestigue Academy Awards ===
Nominations

- Best TV Play-ARY Digital-Nominated
- Best TV Director-Nadeem Baig-Nominated
- Best TV Actor-Humayun Saeed-Winner
- Best TV Actress-Mehwish Hayat-Nominated
- Best TV Supporting Actor/Actress-Saba Hameed-Nominated

=== ARY Social Media Awards ===
- Best Drama-Winner
- Best Actor-Humayun Saeed-Winner
- Best On-Screen Couple-Humayun Saeed & Mehwish Hayat-Winner
- Best Supporting Actor-Imran Ashraf-Winner
- Best Supporting Actress-Mariam Ansari-Winner
- Best Mother-Saba Hameed-Winner
- Best OST-Winner
