= Creek Marina, Karachi =

Creek Marina
- During construction and what it will look like

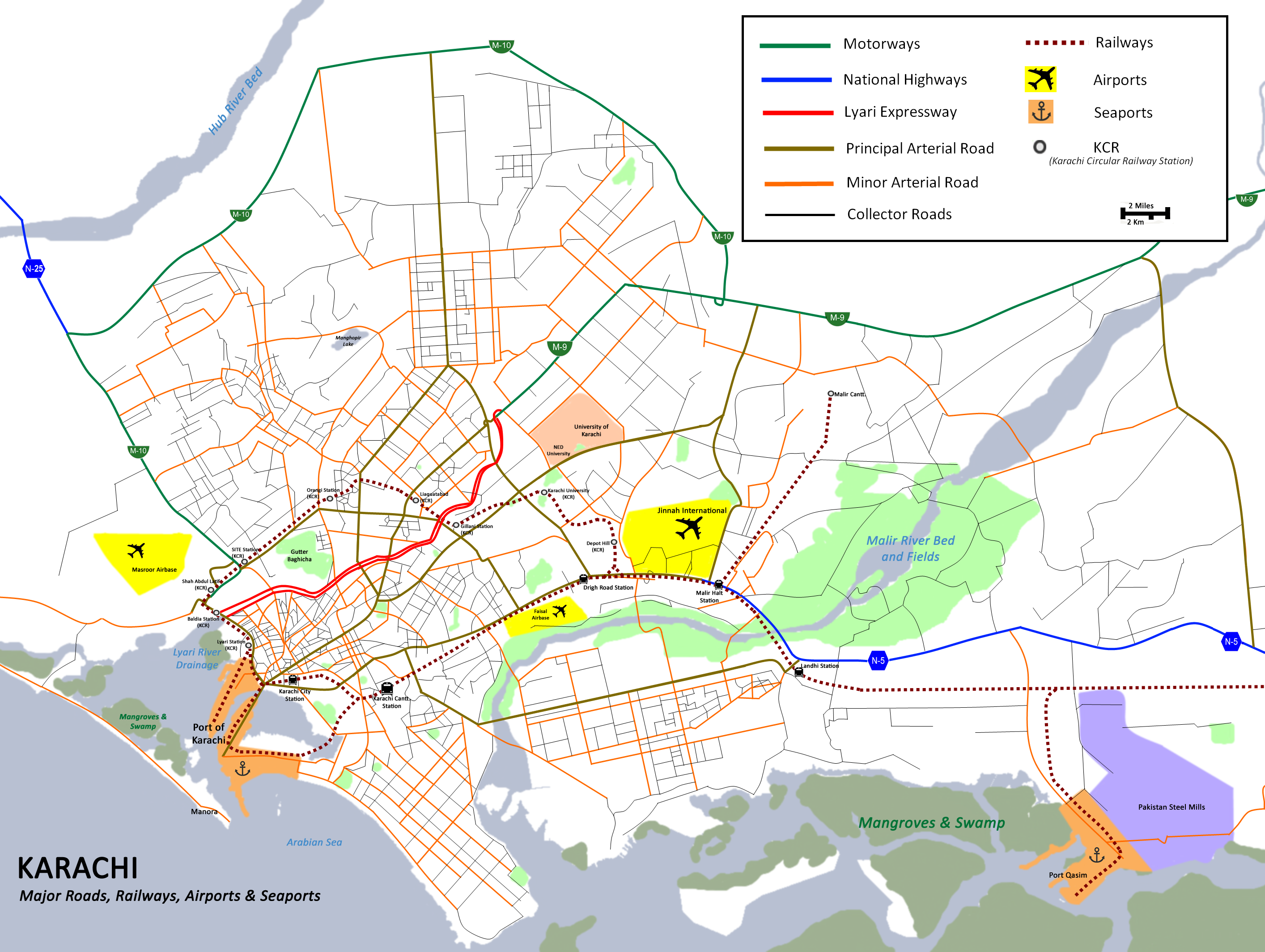
- Location within Karachi

General information
- Status: Under construction
- Type: 6* Residential Towers
- Location: Karachi, Sindh, Pakistan
- Coordinates: 24.764239517417018°N 67.10277254552098°E
- Construction started: 2006
- Estimated completion: 2017

Technical details
- Floor count: 36

Design and construction
- Architect: Meinhardt Group

Website
- creekmarina.com

Creek Marina is an under-construction high-rise ocean front residential project located in DHA Karachi, in Sindh, Pakistan.

It was launched in 2004 as a joint venture project between Meinhardt Singapore PTE Ltd (MSPL) and DHA, while the masterplan was designed by Hirsch Bedner Associates. The project's masterplan includes eight 24-storey towers with a total of 780 apartments.

== Delays and inquiries ==
The development has been the site of repeated delays, with the project initially planned to be completed by 2009. However, conflicts between Meinhardt and DHA have stalled the project's development. Out of 780, 280 apartments were sold by 2010 for an average price of $200,000. In 2011, buyers formed an Action Committee to pursue either a refund or completion of the project. On August 20, 2015, the National Accountability Bureau brought charges against the Creek Marina Project management for cheating the public at large.

In September 2023, the Federal Investigation Agency registered a case against the owners of the Creek Marina project for failing to complete the project and defrauding 200+ customers of Rs. 30 billion over 19 years. The case was registered after the Agency completed its initial inquiry under orders of the Public Accounts Committee.

== See also ==
- Economy of Pakistan
- List of tallest buildings in Pakistan
- Defence Housing Authority
- Defence Housing Society
