= Nueplex Cinemas =

Cinema Complex in Karachi

- Nueplex Cinemas logo
- Address: The Place, Khayaban-e-Shaheen, Phase-VIII, DHA; Karachi; Pakistan
- Capacity: 1200 seats
- Type: 2D & 3D

Construction
- Opened: 30 August 2013
- Architects: Mesbur; Smith

Website
- nueplex.com

Nueplex Cinemas is a movie theatre and the largest Cinema Complex located in Karachi, Pakistan. Housed on the second floor of The Place, built from the ground up and designed by cinema Architects Mesbur & Smith of Canada. Comprising 5 theatres, totalling 1200 seats and home to the 3 largest silver screens in Pakistan.
