= Zainab Chottani =

Pakistani fashion designer

- زینب چوتانی
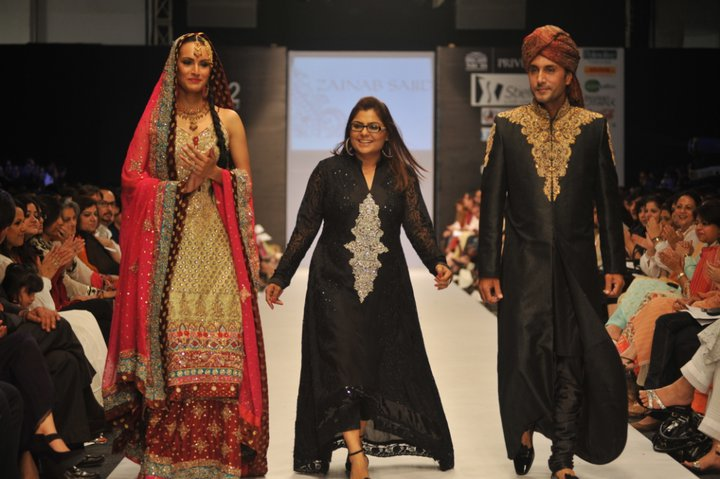
- Zainab at PFW with Nadia and Adnan
- Born: October 16, 1982 (age 44); Karachi, Sindh, Pakistan
- Occupation: Fashion designer

Zainab Chottani is a Pakistani fashion designer who started as a bridal wear designer but has since then included prêt and haute couture in her forte.

== Career ==
Chottani began in bridal fashion under the name of Zainab Sajid in 1999. She works with traditional colors and uses embroidery along with different cuts to form new designs. The designs contain influences from the Mughal Era where Royal women adorned heavily decorated dresses to look more attractive. Her bridal dresses are specifically made to order as to cater to the different requirements of each bride. She has displayed her bridal collection in various exhibitions including the Pantene Bridal Couture week./> Later, she expanded her venture beyond bridal wear and gained widespread appreciation for her timeless, sophisticated lawn dresses.

== Exhibitions and fashion shows ==
Chottani did her first show in 2010 with Frieha Altaf, and has showcased her work during the Pakistan Fashion Week and Bridal Couture Week. Creations from the house of Zainab Chottani have been displayed in various fashion shows. Models adorned her work in the Pakistan Fashion week in London alongside notable designers such as Sonya Battla, Sophia Mehta and Rizwan Ahmad.
