= CineStar (Pakistan) =

- CineStar
- Interactive map of the CineStar area

General information
- Type: Digital 3D; IMAX
- Location: Plot no. 13, 2 Civic Center, Township
- Coordinates: 31°27′02″N 74°18′39″E

Website
- www.cinestar.pk/

CineStar (or Cinestar) was the first IMAX and one of the few 3D movie theatres in Pakistan. It is based in Township, Lahore, Punjab. In March 2012 it was reported that CineStar had signed on an agreement with IMAX Corporation to open up IMAX theatres in Pakistan. In March 2014, it was announced that Pepsi Pakistan and CineStar had signed on to be partners and acquired the rights for IMAX theatres across Pakistan. The IMAX was launched on June 26, 2014 with the release of Transformers: Age of Extinction in Pakistan. But the IMAX license was not renewed in 2024, now it remains a normal theatre.
