= Jawad Bashir =

Pakistani actor, director and singer

- Born: 5 December 1972 (age 53); Lahore, Punjab, Pakistan
- Occupations: Actor; Director; Singer
- Years active: 1994 – present

Jawad Bashir (Urdu: جواد بشیر) is a Pakistani film and television director, actor, and singer. In addition to his work in music, he has directed and acted in eight television drama serials, directed two feature films, worked on numerous advertising projects, and released more than a dozen songs over the course of his career.

== Early life and education ==
Jawad Bashir was born in Lahore and studied graphic design at the National College of Arts (NCA).

== Career ==
=== Music ===
In 1994, Jawad Bashir launched the music group Dr. Aur Billa, an alternative pop band, with Aiyaz Kidwai, also an NCA graduate. Their music was characterized by comedic lyrics, visual satire, and frequent use of Urdu and Punjabi slang. Later Bashir would direct music videos for other bands, most of his videos being funky with a humorous touch. Dr. Aur Billa made a brief comeback in 2012.

=== Director and actor ===
==== Television ====
Bashir began his career in television during the 1990s, a period he has described as more experimental and creatively diverse than later eras. He gained prominence as a host and performer on youth-oriented and comedy programmes, most notably ''VJ'', and later appeared in sitcoms and comedy shows. In interviews, Bashir has stated that early private television allowed greater creative freedom for producers and performers, contrasting it with what he described as a more formula-driven television landscape in subsequent years. He is widely considered to be the director who brought innovation to the TV drama serial industry of Pakistan, especially in sitcoms.

==== Films ====
Bashir later expanded his work into cinema, directing two feature films and appearing as an actor.

=== Advertising ===
In addition to television, film, and music, Bashir has worked extensively in advertising, directing and appearing in numerous commercial campaigns, including for Ufone. He has described advertising as a space that offered creative flexibility and collaborative experimentation, particularly during the early stages of his career, and credited it with influencing his visual and comedic style.

== Selected filmography ==
=== Television series ===
Year	Title	Actor	Director	Network
1995	Teen Bata Teen	Yes	Yes	PTV
1999	Wrong Number	Yes	Yes	PTV World
2001	Shashlik	Yes	Yes	PTV World
2004	Cafe Chill	Yes	Yes	PTV World
2008	Phool Aur Kantay	Yes	Yes	PTV Home
2010	Couples	Yes	Yes	PTV Home
2013	Cafe Inqalab	Yes	Yes	PTV Home
2014	Kamal House	No	Yes	Ary Digital

=== Films ===
Year	Title	Actor	Director	Notes
2015	Maya	No	Yes	Horror
2016	Teri Meri Love Story	Yes	Yes	Rom-com/action

== See also ==
- List of Pakistani actors
