= Ayesha Khan =

Ayesha Khan or Aisha Khan may refer to:

- Aisha Khan (Bangladeshi actress)
- Ayesha Khan (Indian actress)
- Ayesha Khan (Pakistani actress)
- Aisha Uqbah Malik, former Pakistani actress also known as Aisha Khan
- Waseqa Ayesha Khan, Bangladesh Awami League politician
