= Nadeem Baig (director) =

Pakistani director, producer and writer (born 1971)

- ندیم بیگ
- Born: 24 March 1971 (age 55); Karachi, Pakistan
- Occupations: Director; Producer
- Years active: 1997–present
- Notable work: Pyarey Afzal (2013); Punjab Nahi Jaungi (2017); Mere Paas Tum Ho (2019)

Nadeem Baig (born 24 March 1971) is Pakistani film and television director and producer. Baig won the Lux Style Award For Best Director for Punjab Nahi Jaungi.

He made his film directorial debut in 2015 with the highest grosser of the year, Jawani Phir Nahi Ani. He is a frequent collaborator with actor Humayun Saeed and has directed five of the top ten highest-grossing Pakistani films of all time.

== Career ==
=== Television ===
After completing his college education, Nadeem Baig began his career as an editor at a private television channel in Karachi. He initially gained recognition for producing promos of classic Pakistani films and television serials, including the popular drama Dasht, for Network Television Marketing (NTM). His work at NTM drew the attention of producer Tajdar Alam, who encouraged Baig to shift from editing to production. Following the closure of NTM, Baig worked as the production head at Eveready Pictures and later transitioned into directing with various production houses. He directed Parda Na Uthao, a television play written by Umar Sharif, notable for its innovative use of a multi-camera setup. Baig later produced Family Front for PTV, and went on to work on Hum Sab Umeed Se Hain with Nida Yasir for Geo TV. He eventually joined Aaj TV as head of entertainment, where he produced the satirical talk show The Begum Nawazish Ali Show.

His well-known television serials as director include Ladies Park (2011), Omer Dadi Aur Gharwale (2012), Annie Ki Ayegi Baraat (2012) and Pyarey Afzal (2013). 2019's highest-rated drama, which is shown by ARY Digital (Meray Paas Tum Ho) is also on his credit as director. Baig has also co-produced Takkay Ki Ayegi Baraat and Azar Ki Ayegi Baraat.

=== Cinema ===
He made his Lollywood debut with the 2015 comedy film Jawani Phir Nahi Ani which became huge success at the box office and is currently the third-highest-grossing film ever. His next film was the romantic comedy film Punjab Nahi Jaungi which released on 1 September 2017, it became the second-highest-grossing Pakistani film, collecting over Rs.51 crore at the box office.

In recent years he has directed Jawani Phir Nahi Ani 2, which released on Eid-al-Adha 2018 and broke existing records in Pakistan. It was the highest-grossing Pakistani film at the time of its release and is the 3rd highest currently. His fourth film, London Nahi Jaungi, released in 2022 and is the 4th highest-grossing Pakistani film of all time.

== Filmography ==
=== Films ===
Year	Film	Director	Notes
2015	Jawani Phir Nahi Ani	Yes	Debut as film director
2017	Punjab Nahi Jaungi	Yes	Fifth-highest-grossing Lollywood film
2018	Jawani Phir Nahi Ani 2	Yes	Third-highest-grossing Lollywood film
2022	London Nahi Jaunga	Yes	Fourth-highest-grossing Lollywood film
2023	Teri Meri Kahaniyaan	Yes	Anthology film; directed Ek Sau Taeeswan
2025	Love Guru	Yes	Second-highest-grossing Lollywood film

=== Television ===
Year	Serial	Director	Producer	Notes
1997	Family Front		Yes	
1999	Parda Na Uthao	Yes		
2005	Late Night with Begum Nawazish Ali		Yes	Reality show
2009	Azar Ki Ayegi Baraat		Yes	
2011	Ladies Park	Yes		
2011	Takkay Ki Ayegi Baraat		Yes	
2011	Omer Dadi Aur Gharwale	Yes		
2012	Man Jali	Yes		
2012	Annie Ki Ayegi Baraat	Yes		
2013	Pyarey Afzal	Yes		
2013	Abhi Tou Main Jawan Hoon	Yes		Telefilm
2016	Dil Lagi	Yes		
2019	Mere Paas Tum Ho	Yes		
2021	Ghabrana Mana Hai		Yes	Reality show
2021	Sinf-e-Aahan	Yes		
2023	Kuch Ankahi	Yes		Guest role as motorist in Episode 12
2024	Aye Ishq e Junoon		Yes	
2025	Main Manto Nahi Hoon	Yes		

== Awards and nominations ==
Year	Award	Category	Nominated work	Result	Ref(s)
2012	12th Lux Style Awards	Best TV Director	Man Jali	Nominated	
2014	14th Lux Style Awards	Best TV Director	Pyarey Afzal	Won	
2015	15th Lux Style Awards	Best Film Director	Jawani Phir Nahi Ani	Nominated	
2016	16th Lux Style Awards	Best TV Director	Dil Lagi	Nominated	
2016	2016 ARY Film Awards	Best Director	Jawani Phir Nahi Ani	Won	
2017	17th Lux Style Awards	Best Film Director	Punjab Nahi Jaungi	Won	
2018	18th Lux Style Awards	Best Film Director	Jawani Phir Nahi Ani 2	Nominated	
2019	19th Lux Style Awards	Best TV Director	Mere Paas Tum Ho	Nominated	

== See also ==
- List of film and television directors
- List of Pakistani television and theatre directors
