= Defence Housing Authority, Karachi =

Residential neighbourhood in Karachi, Pakistan

Pakistan Defence Officers Housing Authority (PDOHA) Karachi اداره خانه سازی ڈیفنس، کراچی
- Neighbourhood
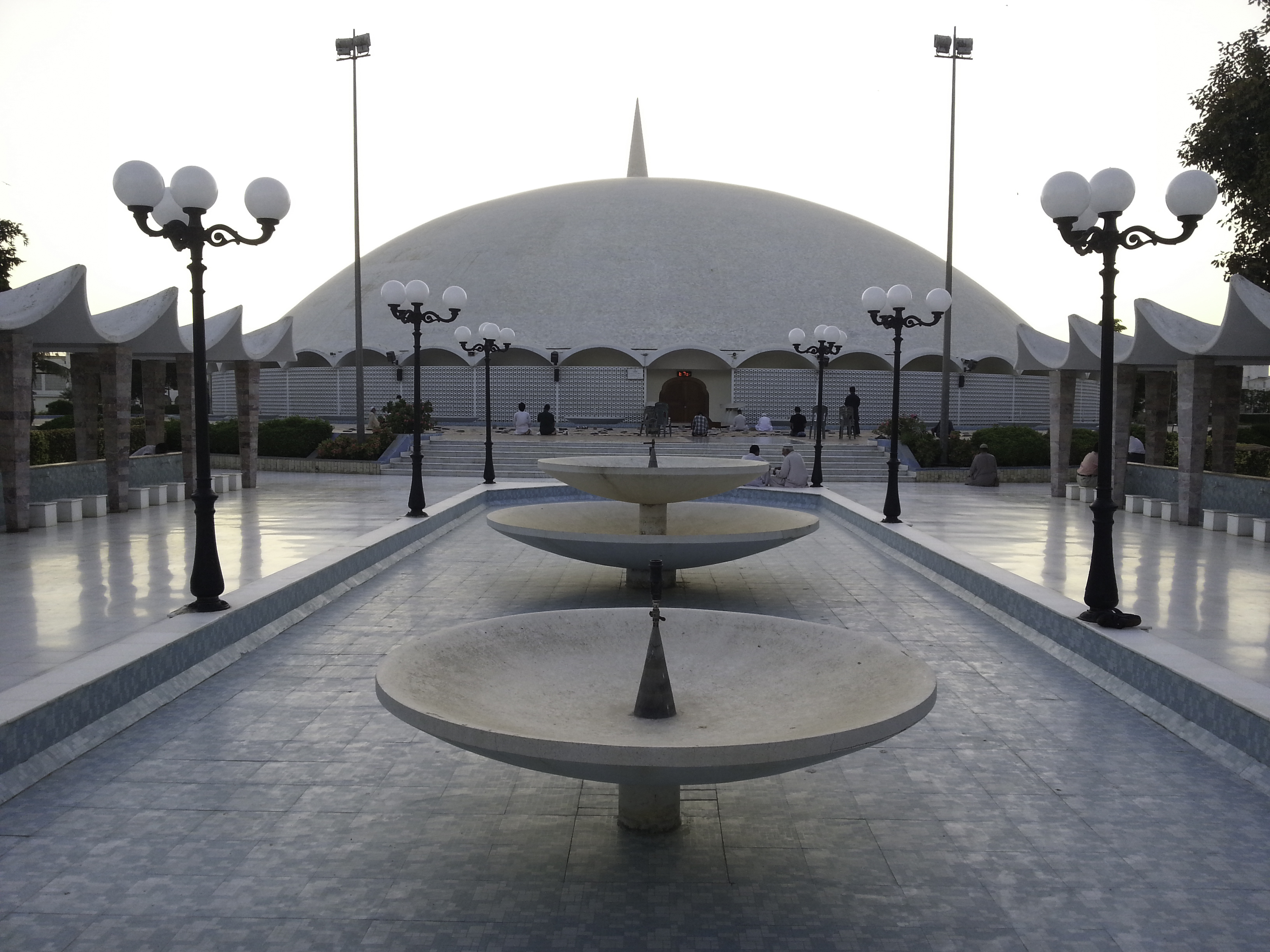
- Masjid-e-Tooba

- Seal
- Nickname: DHA
- Country: Pakistan
- Province: Sindh
- City: Karachi
- Administrative town: Clifton Cantonment

Government
  - Constituency: NA-241 Karachi South-III
  - Founder: Malik Riaz
- Website: www.dhakarachi.org

The Pakistan Defence Officers Housing Authority (PDOHA), Karachi (Urdu: اداره خانه سازی ڈیفنس، کراچی), formerly Pakistan Defence Officers Cooperative Housing Society, is a residential neighbourhood of a to housing society located within Clifton Cantonment of Karachi, Pakistan. The total population of Clifton Cantonment, including Defence Housing Authority, is 1,080,345, per the 2023 Census of Pakistan.

It was originally established as a residential town for retired military personnel by the Armed Forces of Pakistan Welfare Department in the mid-1950s, however, currently, the majority of residents of the neighbourhood are civilian families.

Although part of Karachi City, Defence is actually governed directly by the Clifton Cantonment Board. The DHA body serves as the administrative authority only.

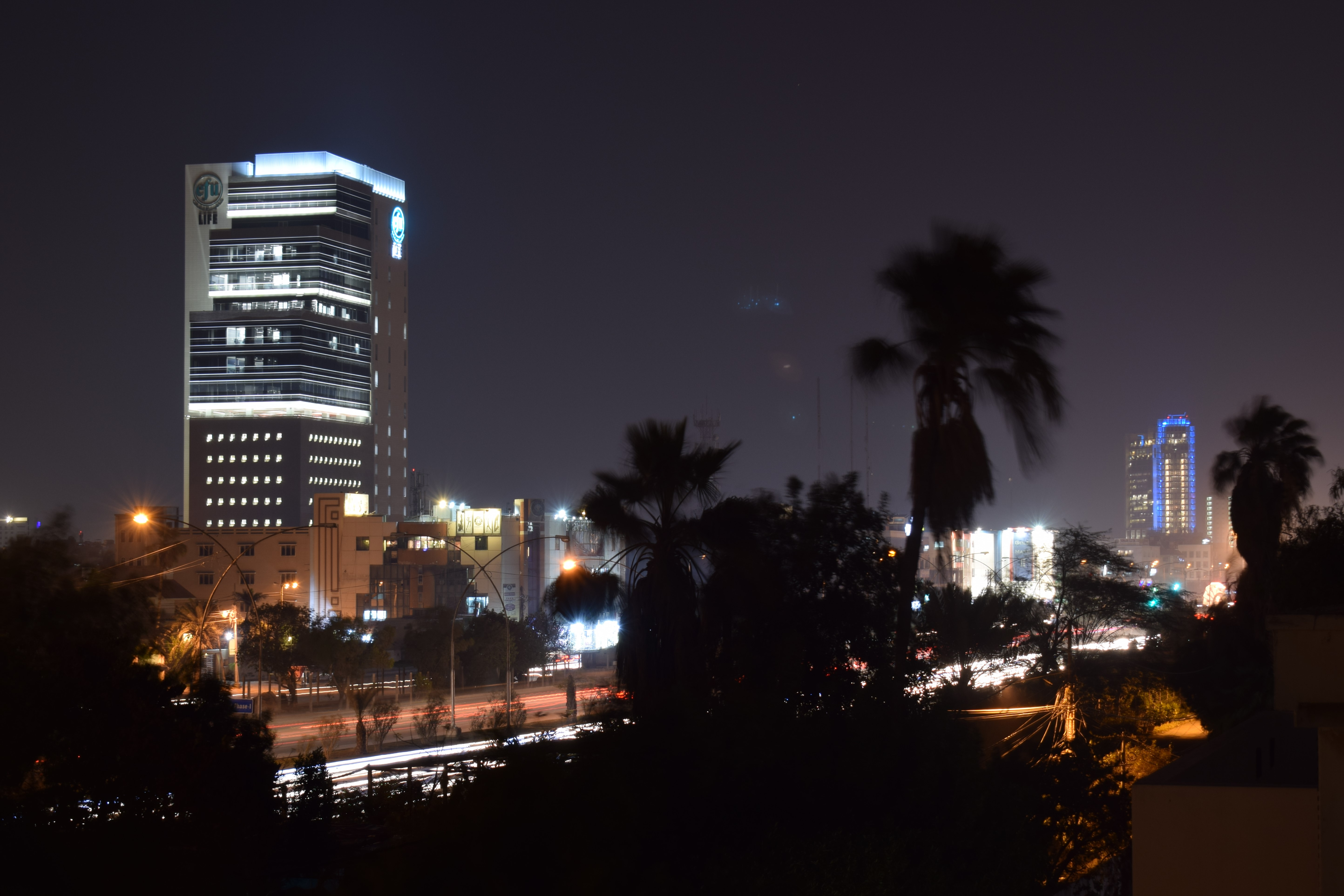
As Karachi has decentralized, some businesses have shifted away from the traditional central business district in Serai Quarter to Defence

== History ==
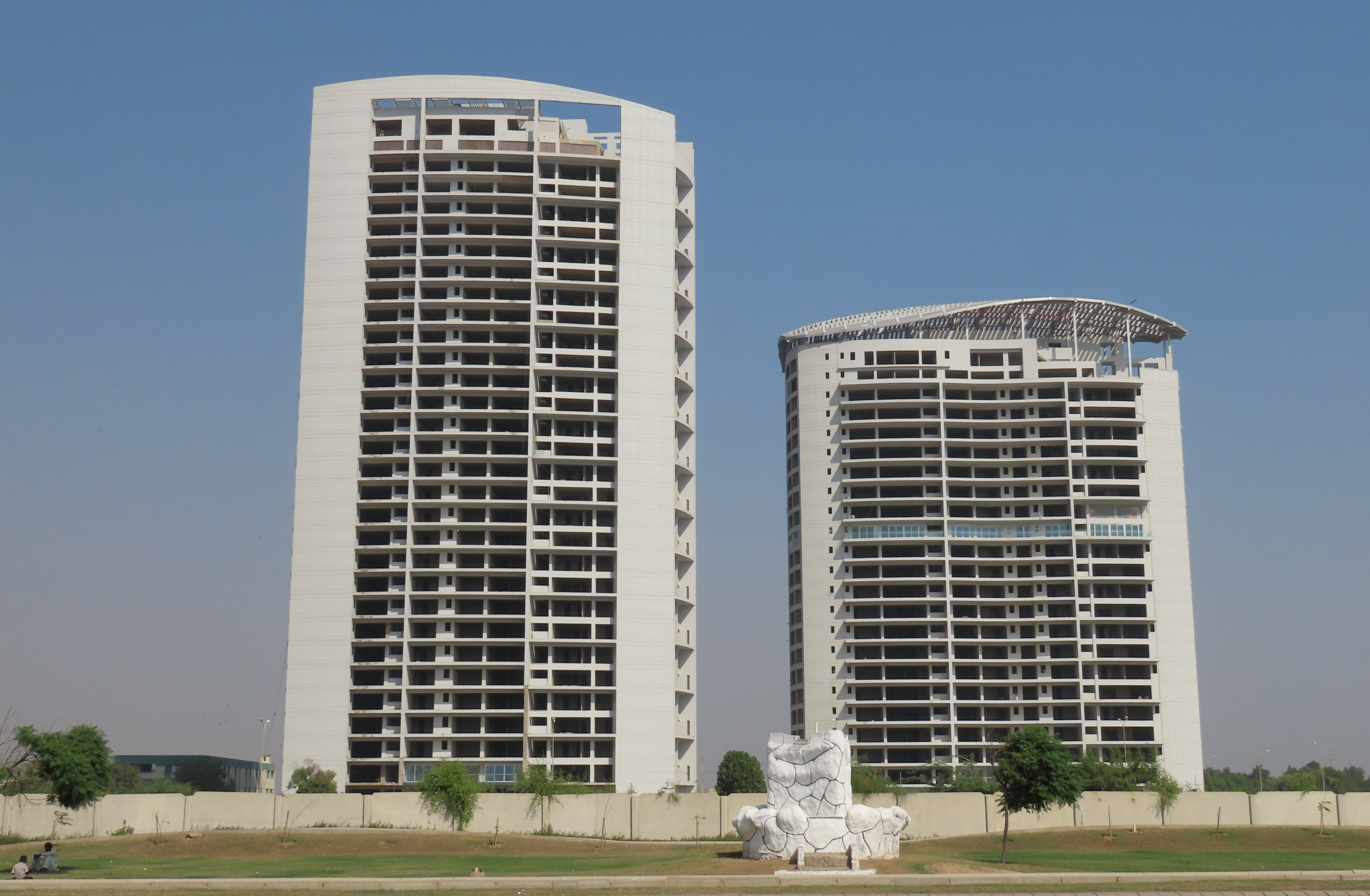
AKD Towers

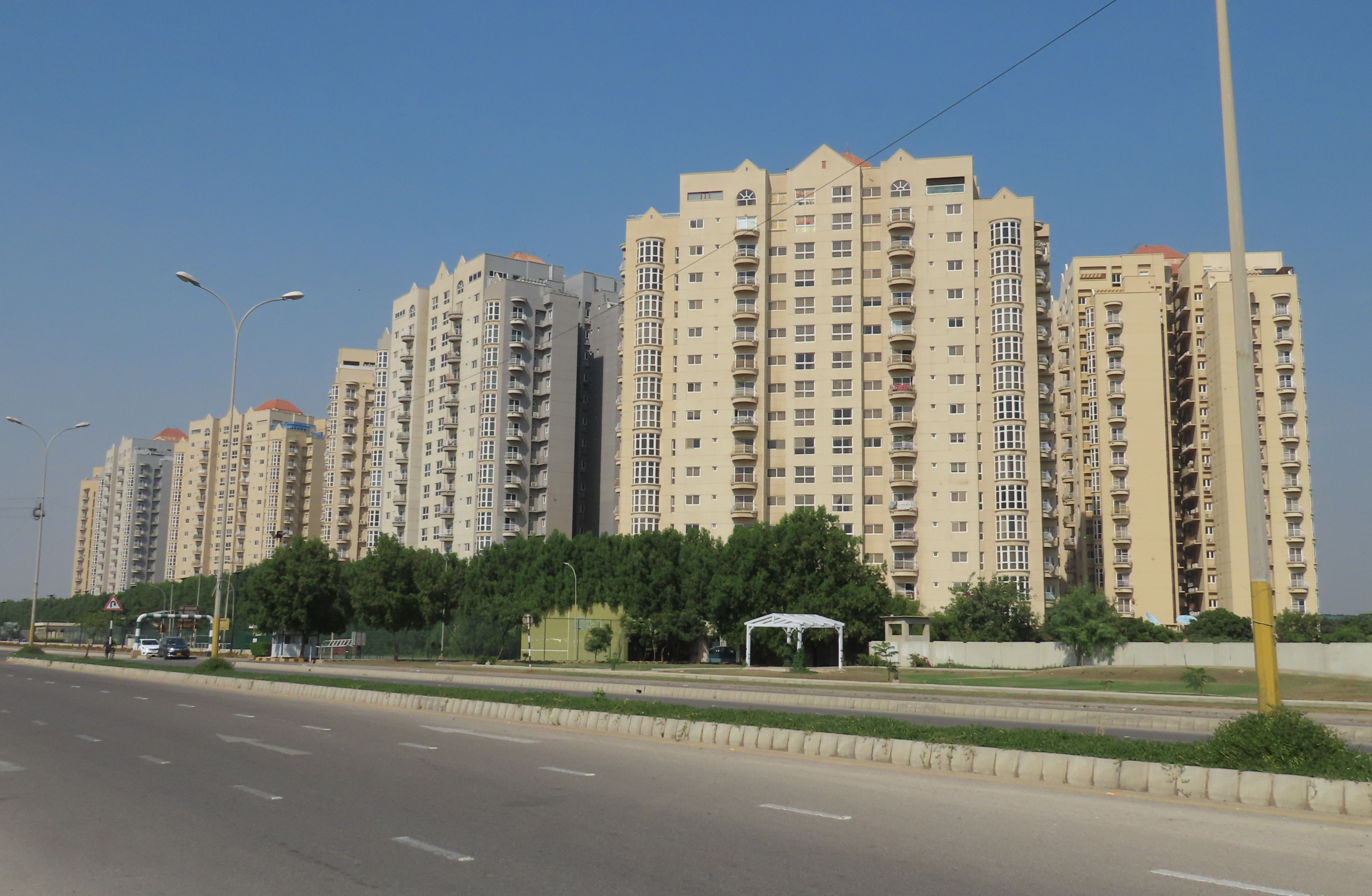
Creek Vista DHA8 Karachi

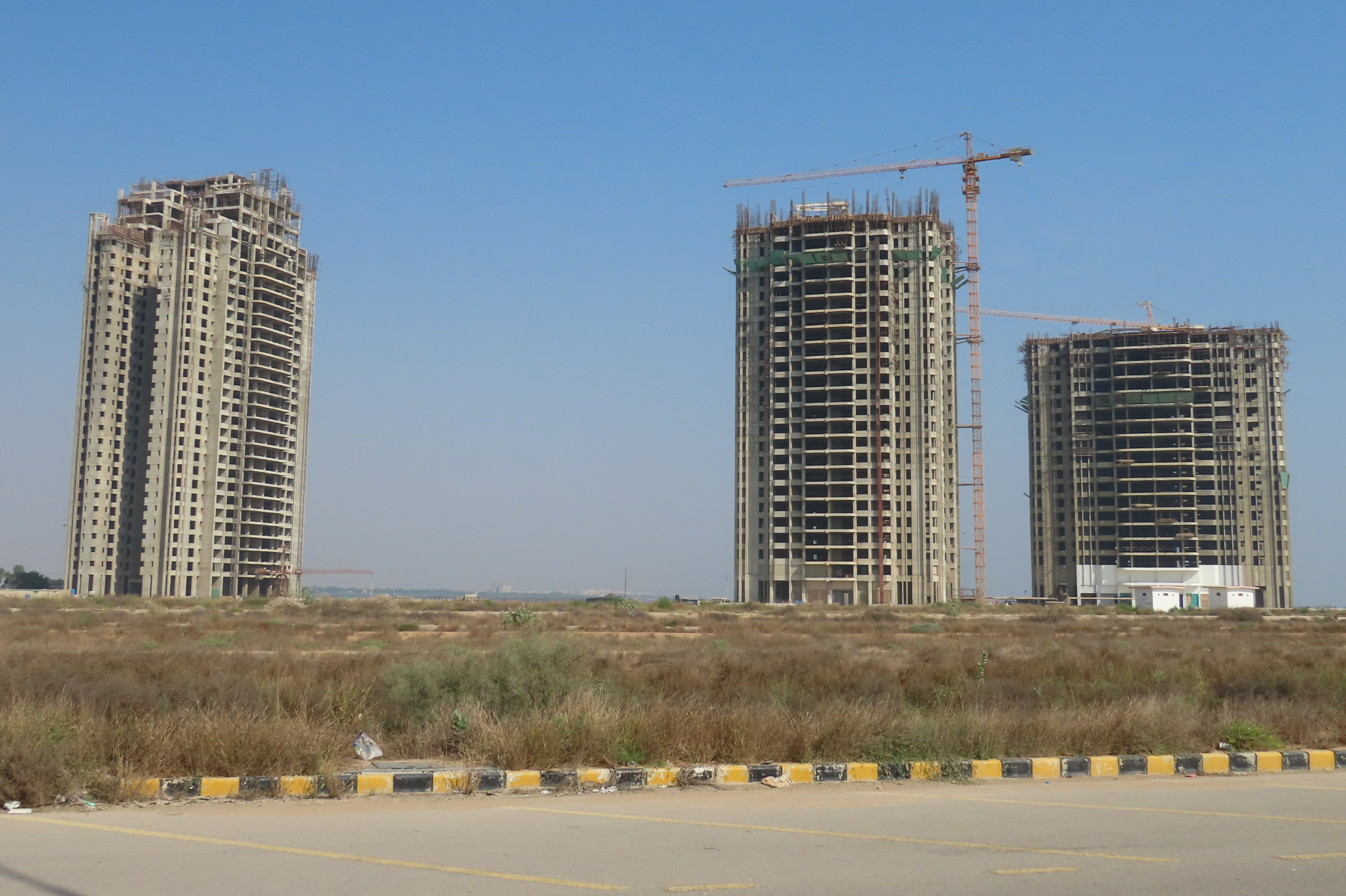
Creek Marina

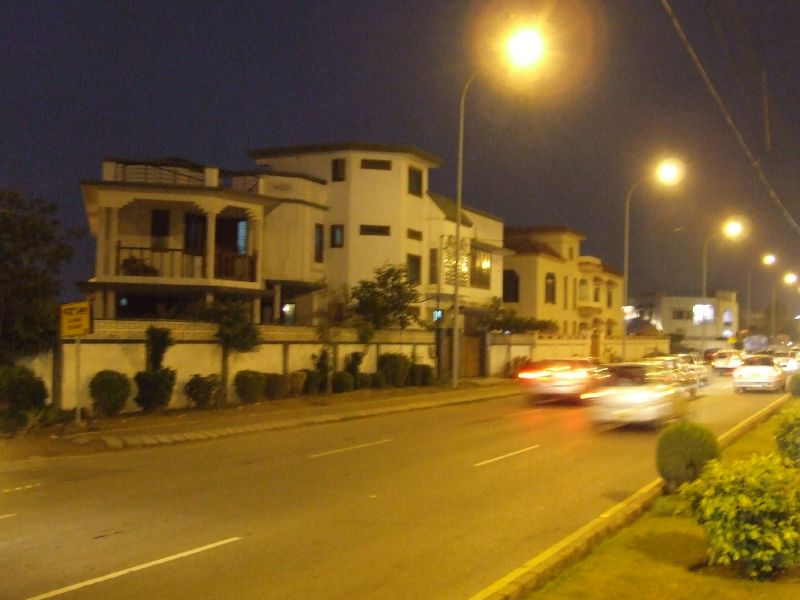
Residential neighborhood in DHA

The Defence was originally established by retired servicemen from the armed forces in the mid-1950s as a cooperative housing society. The office was inaugurated by Rear Admiral Haji Mohammad Siddiq Chaudhry, the first Pakistani Commander-in-Chief of the Pakistani Navy. In 1981, under the orders of President Gen Zia-ul Haq, it was taken over by the government and was put under the control of the Corps Commander Karachi. The authority came into existence through Presidential Order No. 7 of 1980 and was later approved by the National Assembly of Pakistan. The authority is spread over 35.82 square kilometres (8,850 acres) and provides civic facilities to millions of residents. The efforts to develop DHA have been fruitful, signified by growth-oriented high-class living values

The functioning of the authority is vested in the two bodies: the governing body headed by the Secretary Ministry of Defence and the executive board headed by the Corps Commander posted at Karachi. The executive board exercises all administrative, executive and financial powers. The Administrator is the executive head and exercises all executive powers, delegation or otherwise, in accordance with the policy laid down by the governing body and the directions or decisions of the executive board.

== Subdivisions ==
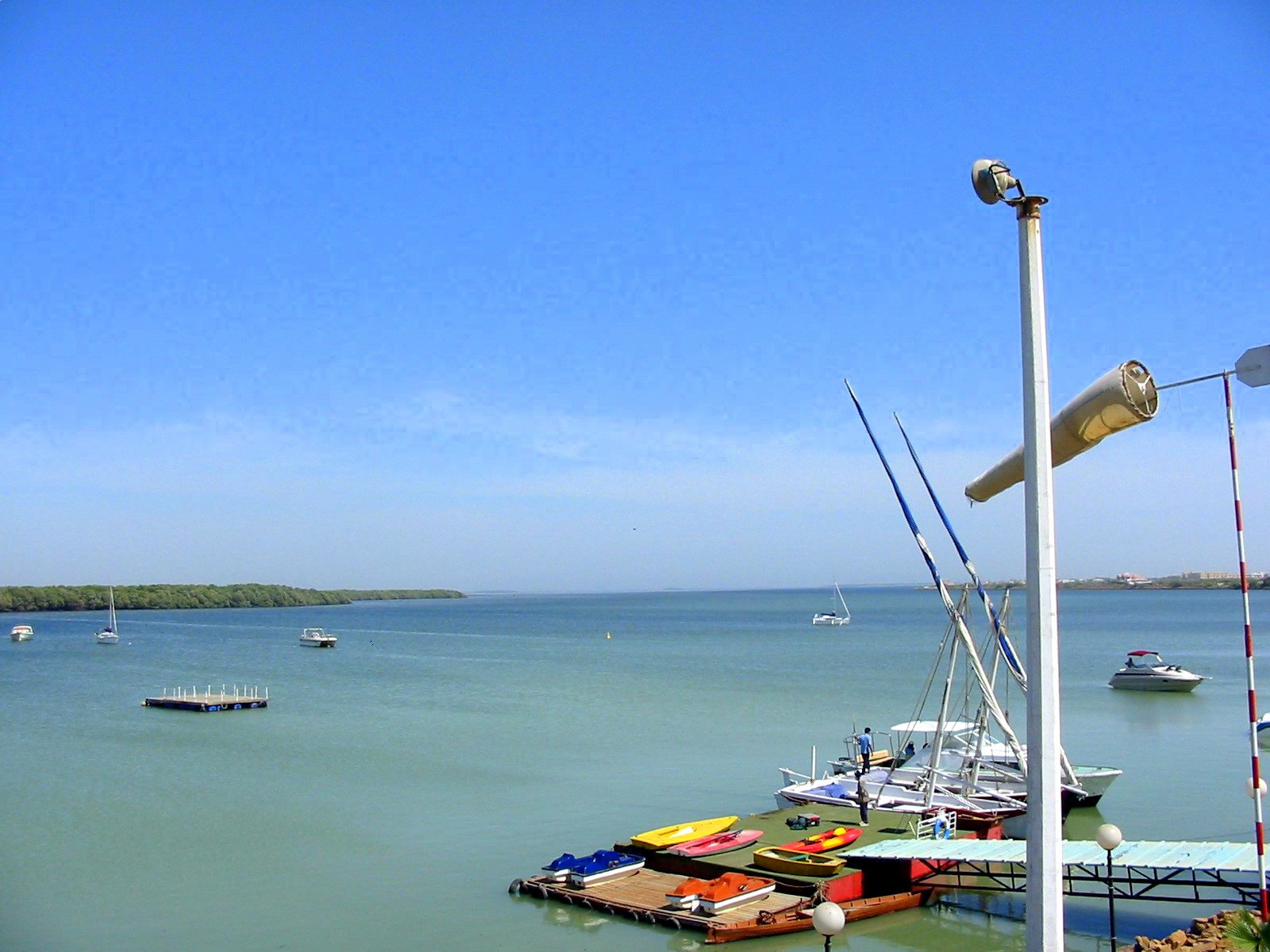
Marina Club along Gizri Creek

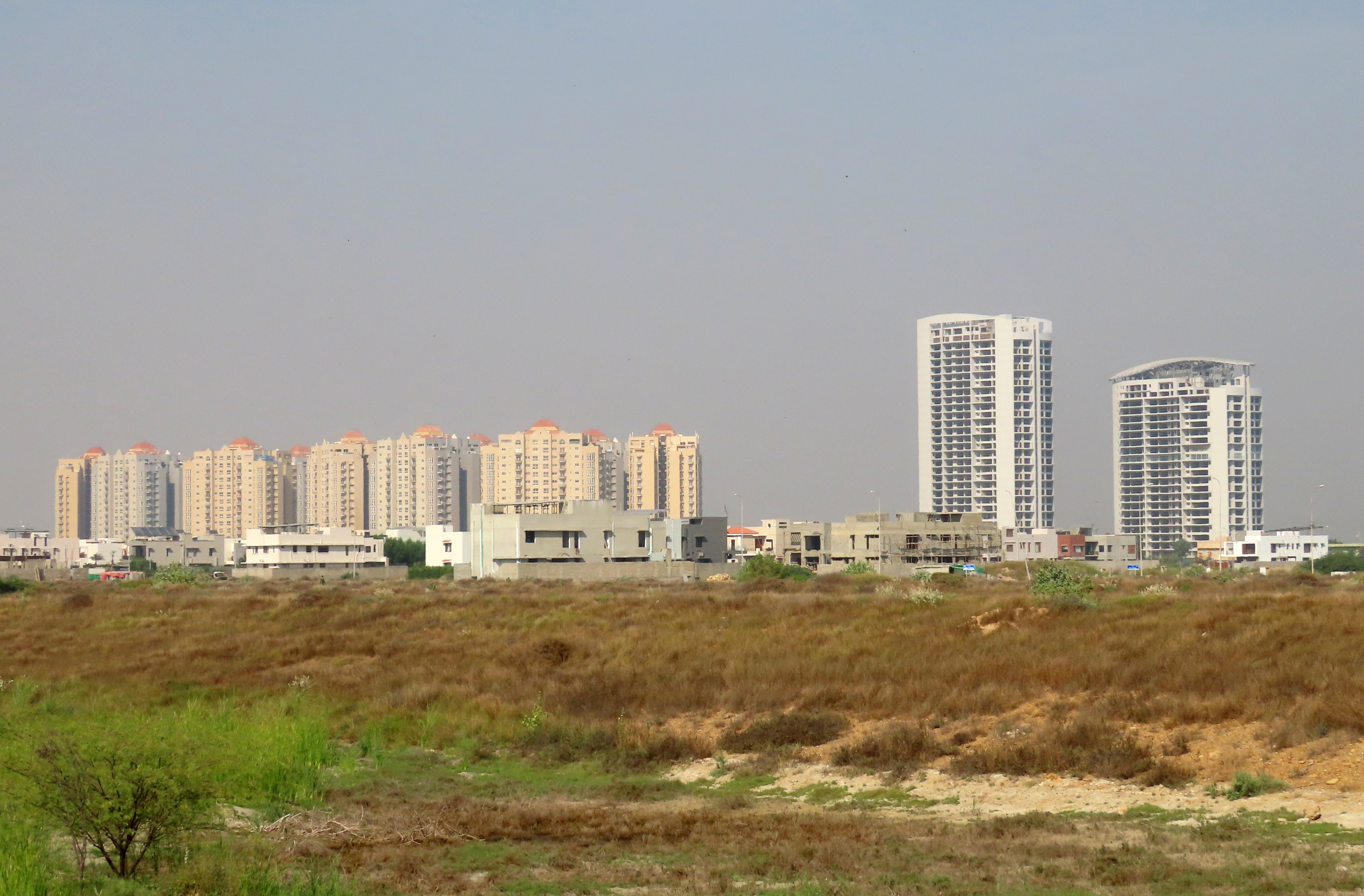
Much of Phase 8 is still empty

Defence is divided into 9 subdivisions, Phases 1-8 and DHA CITY which is located on the M-9 motorway. Each phase is subdivided further into blocks and sectors. Each phase also has a central commercial area and park to cater to the local community. Housing construction began from Defence I and proliferated east and south towards what is today Defence VIII and then DHA CITY to the north of Karachi city in District Malir. Housing plots range from 126.4 m^{2} (1,361 sq ft) to 1,012 m^{2} (10,890 sq ft). The Karachi Defence Housing Authority building is located at 2-B, East Street, Defence Phase I.

In recent times, there were several complaints against encroachments by the concerned citizens in phase 6 at Khayaban-e-Seher adjacent to the commercial area. Houses were built on an area which was allocated for commercial area car parking. Demolition orders have been passed, notice will be issued to residents to vacate the premises by the end of 2021.

== Transport ==
- Korangi Road/National Highway: connects DHA to Shahrah-e-Faisal near the Finance and Trade Centre, Karachi on one side and Korangi Industrial Area on the other. It runs in Phase I and Phase II. Masjid-e-Tooba, a tourist attraction in Karachi for its unique architecture is located in DHA Phase II.
- Sunset Boulevard: Sunset Boulevard connects DHA to Mai Kolachi on one side and meets Korangi Road on the other side. Sunset Boulevard runs in Phase II.
- Khayaban-e-Shamsheer: meets Gizri Boulevard on one end and Beach Avenue on the other. It runs perpendicular to Khayaban-e-Hafiz. Landmarks on Shamsheer include the Saudi Embassy. It runs in Phase V.
- Khayaban-e-Ittehad: meets Korangi Road on one side and Seaview Road on the other. Khayaban-e-Ittehad curves shortly after its intersection with 5th street and from that point onwards runs at an angle of 45 degrees from the vertical. It meets most of the roads that run in DHA. It runs in Phase VI, Phase VII & Phase VIII.
- Khayaban-e-Hafiz: continuous with Chaudri Khaliq-uz-Zaman Road on one side and goes deep into Phase VIII on the other side. Landmarks on Hafiz include the Saudi Embassy and the Sultan Masjid. Hafiz runs in Phase V, Phase VI and Phase VIII.
- Khayaban-e-Shaheen: runs parallel to Hafiz. It is continuous with Zamzama Boulevard on one side and passes through 'Creek City' on the other side. Landmarks on Shaheen include Shaikh Zaid's 'Mehel'. Shaheen runs in Phase V, Phase VI and Phase VIII.
- Gizri: mainly a commercial road, continuous with Khayaban-e-Hafiz on one side and Chaudry Khaliq-uz-Zaman Road on the other. Landmarks include the 'Submarine Chowk'. It has its own system of streets and lanes, known as the 'Gizri Streets' and 'Gizri Lanes'. It runs in Phase IV.
- Zamzama: a commercial road that is continuous with Khayaban-e-Shaheen on one side and ends at 'Two Talwar' on the other side. It has its own system of streets and lanes, known as 'Commercial lanes' (not to be confused with the commercial lanes in Phase IV) and 'Zamzama streets'. It runs in Phase V. Zamzama street and is home to Karachi's most elite designer shops for clothes, shoes and accessories. It also has high-end restaurants and coffee shops which are popular spots for the rich and the fashionable residing in the posh neighbourhoods of DHA.
- Khayaban-e-Bahria: runs perpendicular to Khayaban-e-Hafiz. It meets up with Khayaban-e-Ittehad on one side and Seaview Road on the other. Landmarks include the Sultan Masjid. It runs in Phase V and Phase VII.
- 26th street runs parallel to Khayaban-e-Hafiz. It meets up with Abdullah Shah Ghazi road/Shahrah-e-Firdousi on one side and goes deep into Phase VIII on the other. 26th street runs in Phase V, Phase VI and Phase VIII.
- Seaview Road/Beach Avenue: runs along the sea. It connects Defence with Mai Kolachi on one side and goes deep into Phase VIII on the other side. Seaview Road runs in Phase V, Phase VI and Phase VIII.
- Commercial Avenue: runs parallel to Khayaban-e-Hafiz. It meets up with Khayaban-e-Jami on one side and Khayaban-e-Ittehad on the other and has its own system of streets and lanes, known as 'Commercial Streets' and 'Commercial Lanes' (not to be confused with Zamzama's commercial lanes). Commercial Avenue is also known as the 'naalay walee sarak' (road with the drainage line) because a drain runs through the middle of the road. Landmarks include the Imam Bargha and the DHA School Phase IV branch. Commercial Avenue runs through Phase IV and Phase VI.
- Zulfiqar Street 1: starts at Khayaban-e-Ittehad and ends at Seaview Road. Creek Club, Marina Club, Carlton Hotel, Area 51 and Golf Club are all located on Zulfiqar Street 1. Zulfiqar Street 1 also meets up with Creek City. It runs through Phase VIII.
- Malir Expressway: under construction to link DHA phase 7 to DHA CITY

=== System of streets and lanes ===
There are six main systems of streets and lanes in DHA: the normal streets and lanes found in Phase IV, V, VI, VII and VIII; the commercial streets and lanes in Phase IV; the Gizri streets and lanes in Phase IV; the Zamzama streets in Phase V; the South/Central/North streets, found in Phase I, II, and Phase II extension; and the Sunset streets and lane, found in Phase II and Phase II extension.

- Normal streets and lanes: In the normal system, streets and lanes are parallel to each other, with the exception of 26th lane, which runs at an angle to all the other lanes. Normal streets and lanes run parallel to Khayaban-e-Hafiz.
- Commercial streets and lanes: Commercial streets run parallel to Commercial Avenue, while commercial lanes run perpendicular to Commercial Avenue. 5th Commercial Lane, 4th Commercial Lane, 2nd Commercial Lane and 1st Commercial Lane meet up with the Gizri system of streets and lanes.
- Gizri streets and lanes: In the Gizri system, streets and lanes are perpendicular to each other, as would be expected. Gizri streets run parallel to Gizri Boulevard, while Gizri lanes run perpendicular to Gizri Boulevard. N lane, N Street, M Street, 1st Gizri Street, Gizri Avenue, 2nd Gizri Lane and 1st Gizri Lane all meet up with Commercial Avenue. Gizri Avenue also meets up with Gizri, and goes on to meet Zamzama as well.
- Zamzama streets and lanes: Zamzama's streets have their own peculiarities: 12th Zamzama Street, 9th Zamzama Street and 1st Zamzama Street run perpendicular to Zamzama while the other Zamzama streets run parallel to it. 4th Zamzama street meets up with Two Talwar. 3rd Zamzama Street is continuous with Khayaban-e-Shujaat.
- South/Central/North streets: The South/Central/North Streets run parallel to each other and perpendicular to Sunset Boulevard. South Streets run from Sunset Boulevard to South Circular Avenue, Central Streets run from South Circular Avenue till Sailor Street, and North Streets run from Korangi Road till the end of Phase I.
- Sunset streets and lanes: Sunset streets run perpendicular to Sunset Boulevard while Sunset lanes run parallel to it.

== See also ==
- Defence Housing Authority
- Defence Housing Authority, Islamabad
