= The Girl Who Lived in the Tree =

2008 fashion collection by Alexander McQueen

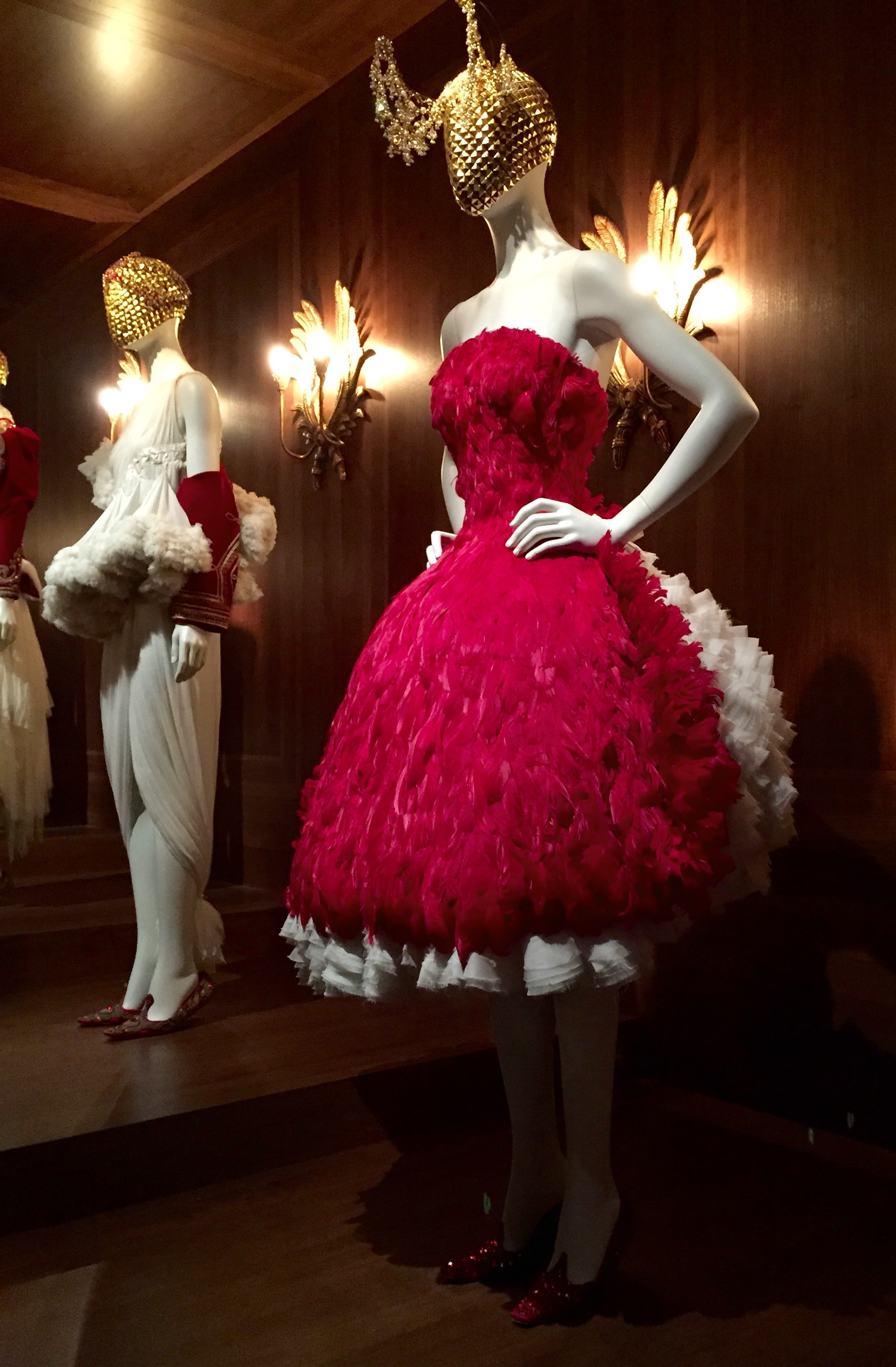
Two dresses from The Girl Who Lived in the Tree: background on the left, Look 27, and foreground Look 35, from the Alexander McQueen: Savage Beauty exhibition, 2015 staging

The Girl Who Lived in the Tree is the thirty-second collection by British fashion designer Alexander McQueen, released for the Autumn/Winter 2008 season of his eponymous fashion house. The primary inspirations were British culture and national symbols, particularly the British monarchy, as well as the clothing of India during the British Raj. The collection was presented through the narrative of a fairy tale about a feral girl who lived in a tree before falling in love with a prince and descending to become a princess.

The collection's runway show was staged on 29 February 2008 at the Palais Omnisports de Paris-Bercy in Paris. The round stage was dressed in black with a black backdrop, with a large artificial tree in the centre wrapped in dark grey silk; it was inspired by the artists Christo and Jeanne-Claude, who were known for wrapping buildings and landmarks in fabric. The presentation was divided into two phases to represent the girl's story; forty-two looks were presented in total, with twenty-three in the first half and nineteen in the second. In the first phase, the ensembles were all in black and white, with most looks having a slim, tailored silhouette. The clothing from the second half was richly coloured, with luxurious materials and embellishments, representing the girl's transformation into a princess.

Critical response to The Girl Who Lived in the Tree was positive, and in retrospect it is regarded as one of McQueen's best collections. Academics have analysed its inspiration and styling through various lenses. The peacock headpiece by Philip Treacy and a dress with lace peacocks attracted particular critical attention and further analysis. Garments from the collection are held by various museums and have appeared in exhibitions such as the McQueen retrospective Alexander McQueen: Savage Beauty. The 2015 semi-biographical play McQueen incorporates ideas from the collection's narrative.

== Background ==
British fashion designer Alexander McQueen was known for his imaginative, sometimes controversial designs, and dramatic fashion shows. Over the course of his career, which lasted from 1992 until his death in 2010, he explored a broad range of ideas and themes, particularly sexuality, death, violence, romanticism, and historicism. He learned tailoring as an apprentice on Savile Row, and dressmaking as head designer at French fashion house Givenchy. (Note: From October 1996 to October 2001, McQueen was simultaneously head designer at Givenchy and at his own label.) Although he worked in ready-to-wear – clothing produced for retail sale – his showpiece designs featured a degree of craftsmanship that verged on haute couture.

I learned a lot from her death [...] I learned a lot about myself. [I learned] that life is worth living. Because I'm just fighting against it, fighting against the establishment. She loved fashion, and I love fashion, and I was just in denial.

— McQueen, reflecting on the death of Isabella Blow, interviewed in W, June 2008

McQueen's graduation collection, Jack the Ripper Stalks His Victims, was bought in its entirety by magazine editor Isabella Blow, who became another mentor and his muse. Their relationship was turbulent, and they had been estranged when Blow committed suicide in May 2007. Despite their differences, McQueen was devastated by her death. For his next collection, McQueen worked closely with Irish milliner Philip Treacy, one of his longtime collaborators and another of Blow's protégés. The collection, La Dame Bleue (Spring/Summer 2008), was dedicated to Blow's memory. Afterward, McQueen travelled to India for a month with his friend and collaborator Shaun Leane. He later described the trip as a "pilgrimage" during which he had worked through his grief by absorbing Buddhist spiritual teachings and culture.

McQueen was devoted to his Scottish heritage, but also felt a strong connection to England, especially London, where he had grown up. He was appointed a Commander of the Order of the British Empire by Queen Elizabeth II in 2003. Although he had previously been vocally critical of the British monarchy, and was reluctant to accept the award, he later said that meeting the queen had been "like falling in love".

== Concept and collection ==
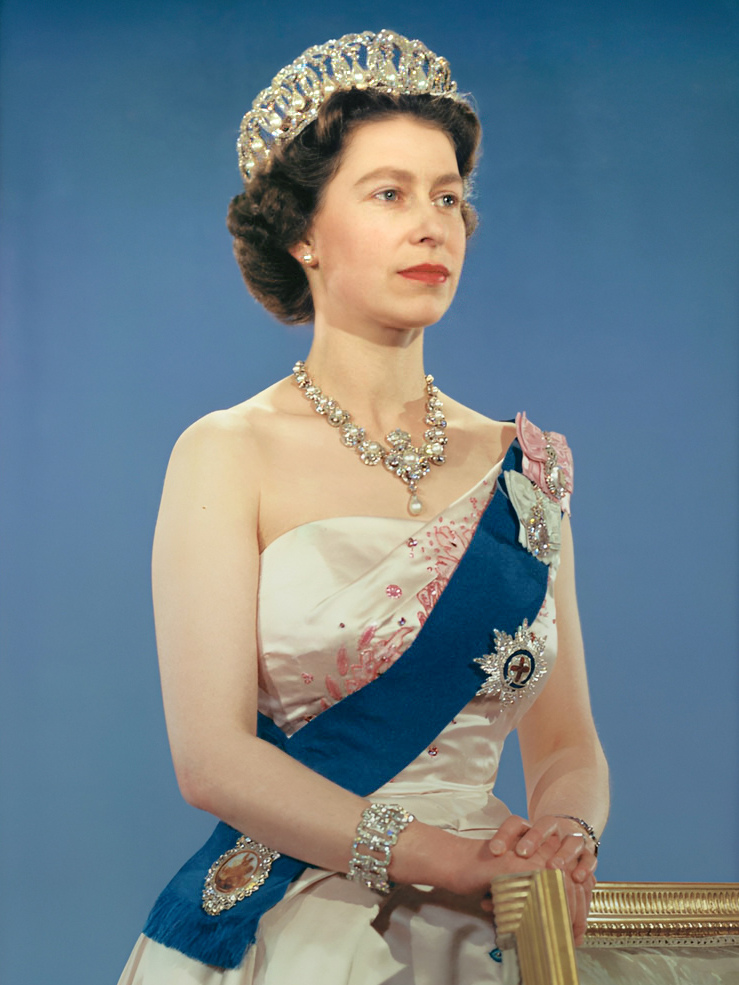
Formal portrait of the young Queen Elizabeth II, 1959

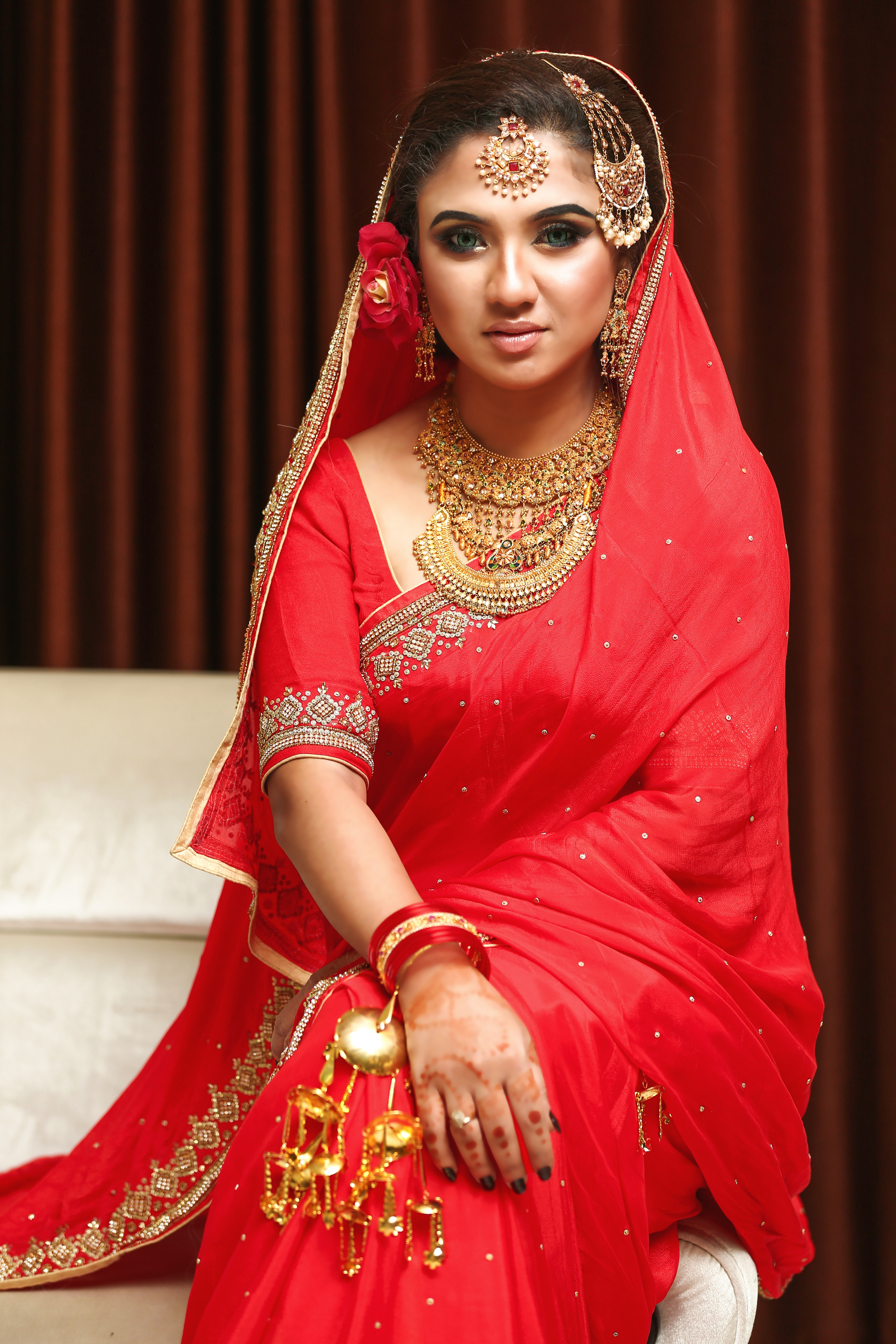
Woman in red sari and gold jewellery

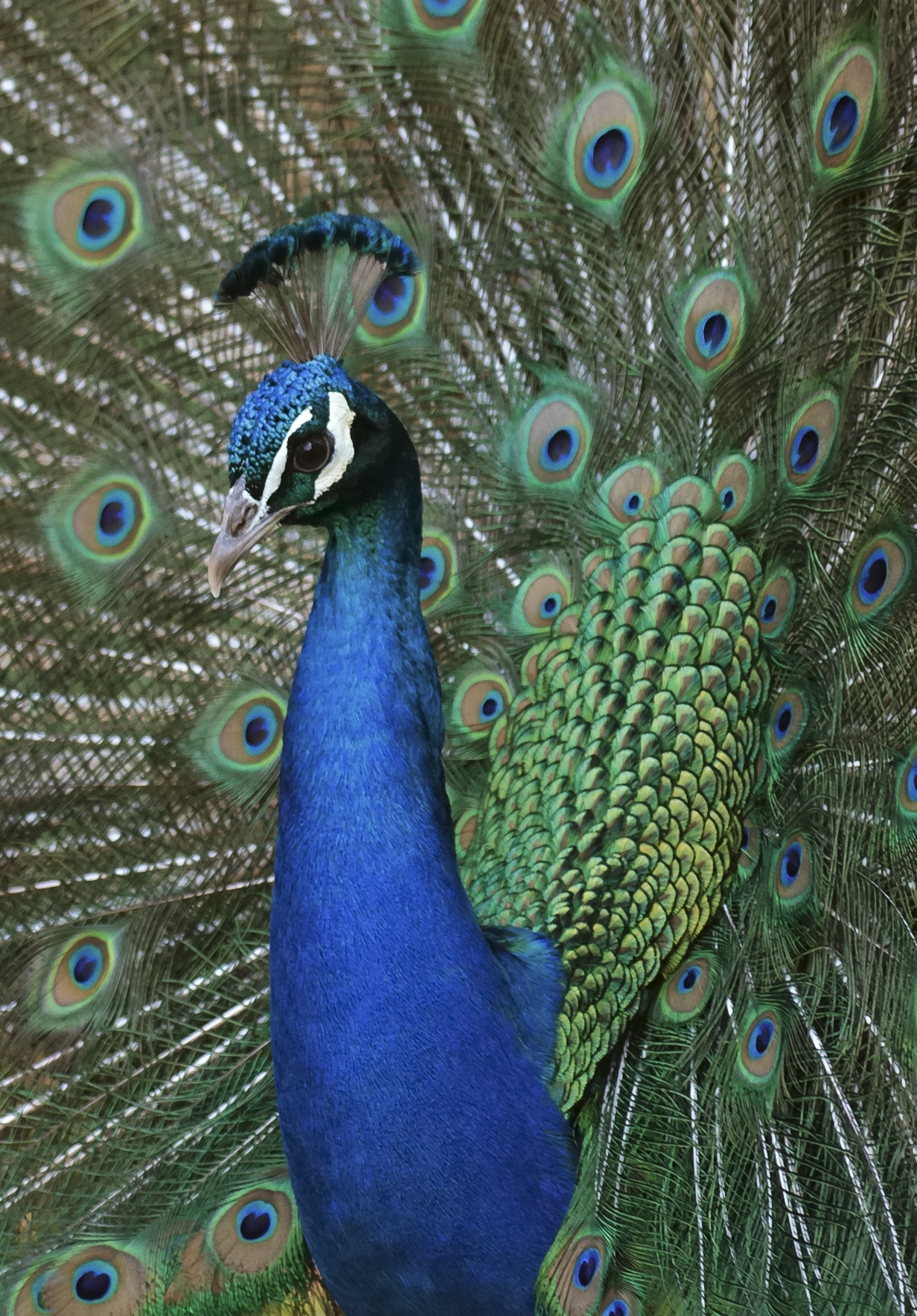
Peacock flaring his tail feathers

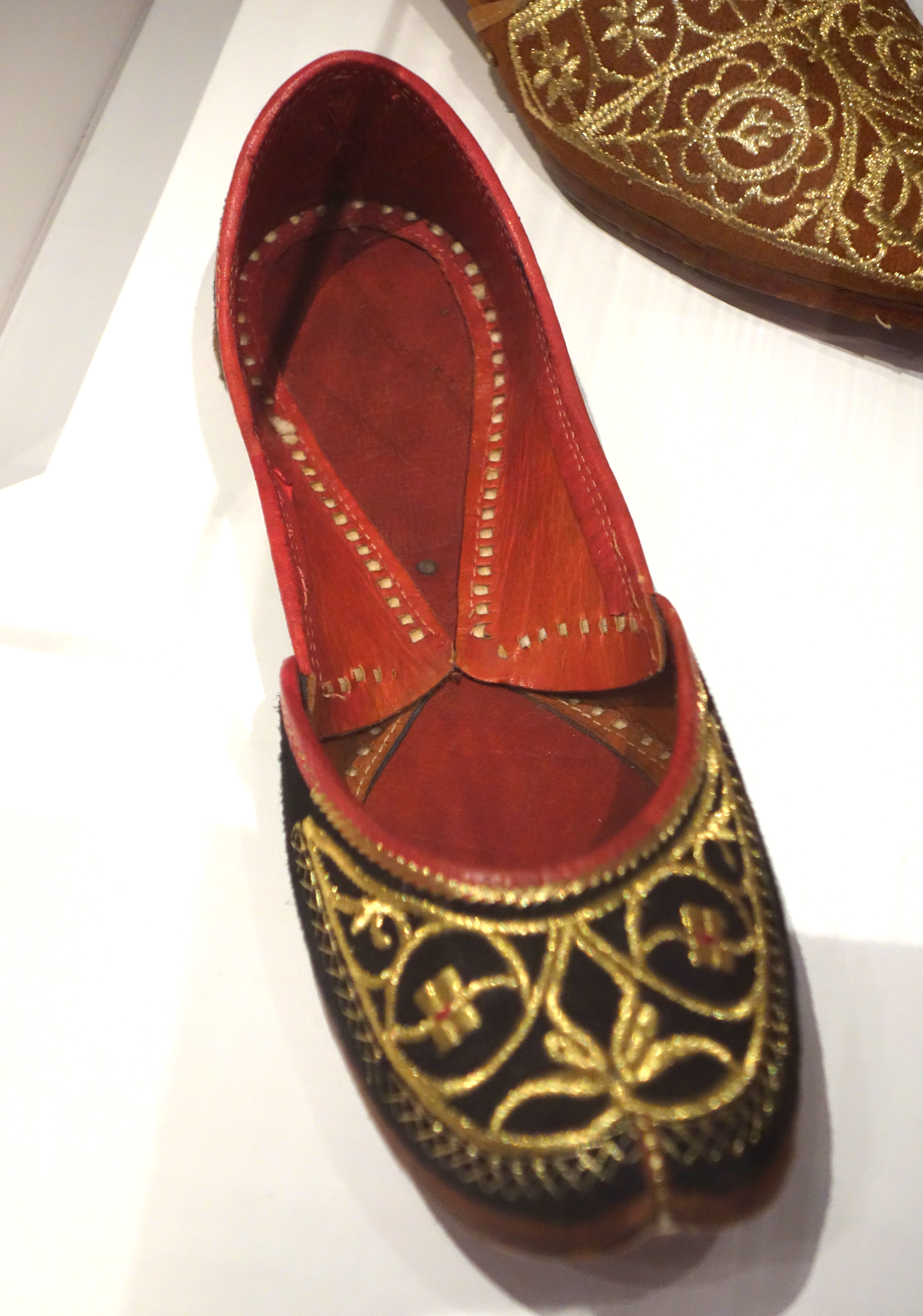
Jutti, embellished slippers similar to ballet flats

The Girl Who Lived in the Tree (Autumn/Winter 2008) is the thirty-second collection McQueen made for his eponymous fashion house. The collection was presented through the narrative of a fairy tale about a feral girl who lived in a tree before falling in love with a prince and descending to become a princess. According to McQueen, this story was inspired by an ancient elm tree in the garden of his country home in Farleigh, England, and the girl represented Queen Elizabeth II as a young woman. McQueen's biographer Dana Thomas said "it seems he had truly fallen in love" with the Queen. Author Judith Watt felt that the fairy tale story reflected McQueen's romantic innocence and "stemmed back to childhood days". Although it was one of his most nationalist collections, journalist Susannah Frankel felt it contained elements of "irony and pastiche", and McQueen joked that he had picked the royal theme for selfish reasons: "I thought, I'll do this thing on the Queen, and I'll get the knighthood. I'll become Sir Alexander McQueen."

The visual aesthetic of the collection was inspired by British culture and national symbols, particularly the British monarchy, as well as the clothing of India during the British Raj. McQueen cited the Duke of Wellington in the show notes, and there were military influences in the form of tailcoats and decorative frogging. He also drew heavily on the clothing he had seen in India with Leane, incorporating lush embroidery, jewelled headdresses, jutti (slippers resembling ballet flats), and the printed silk fabric used for saris. Primary fabrics included brocade, duchesse satin, silk, and velvet. Real semiprecious stones were used for embroidery and embellishment. The collection was unusually feminine compared to McQueen's usual work, which typically had a harder edge.

The designs were divided into two broad phases, which followed the girl's journey out of the tree. (Note: Judith Watt divided the collection into three phases instead: the first nine looks representing the girl in her purely feral state, Looks 10 to 23 a transitional period after meeting the prince, and Looks 24 to 42 as the culmination of her transformation into princess.) The clothes from the first half represented the girl's feral state, taking inspiration from punk fashion to create a style which McQueen called "punk princess". These looks were entirely black and white, with a slim silhouette accentuated by a cinched waistline. McQueen largely confined his ever-present tailored garments to this half of the show, although dresses and flounced ballerina skirts also featured here. Decorative embellishments in this phase included leather, crystals, lace, and silver printing. Grey-based tartan referenced McQueen's Scottish heritage.

The clothing from the second half was richly coloured, with luxurious materials and embellishments, representing the girl's transformation into a princess. The military elements were echoed here with regimental-style jackets and gold frogging. The skirts of the later dresses were exaggerated with crinolines, referencing the haute couture gowns Norman Hartnell and Hardy Amies each designed for Elizabeth II in her youth. Footwear in this phase was similar to heavily-beaded shoes designed by Roger Vivier for Christian Dior in the 1950s.

Imagery of birds, wings, and feathers were a recurring theme in McQueen's work. In The Girl Who Lived in the Tree he focused on the peacock, India's national bird, which is culturally associated with beauty, grace, and love. He asked Irish milliner Philip Treacy to create a peacock headpiece for the collection; as usual his creative brief was simple and gave wide latitude for interpretation. Treacy used driftwood to build the bird's body and sea fan coral for its tail; he recalled McQueen being "speechless" when he saw it.

== Runway show ==
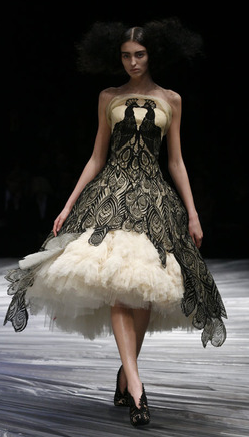
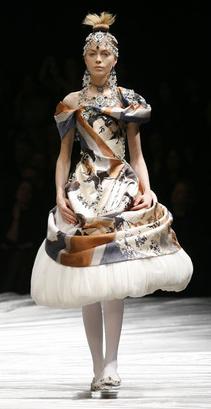
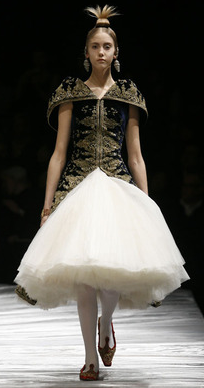
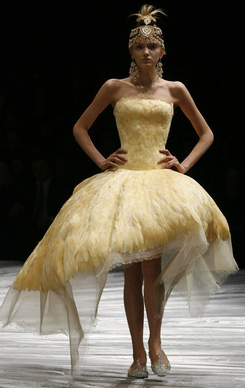
Looks 23, 29, 33, and 34 as shown on the runway

=== Production details ===
The runway show was staged on the evening of 29 February 2008 at the Palais Omnisports de Paris-Bercy in Paris. It was the final show of the day. The invitation card featured an etching of a tree on gold-coloured paper on the outside, and on the inside, an image of a girl whose hair was mixed with tree branches. McQueen personally invited Bobby Hillson to the show as a gesture of gratitude for her mentorship. On the same day of the show, McQueen announced that his label was finally making a profit.

Tabitha Simmons took care of overall styling, Paul Hanlon handled hair, and Peter Philips styled make-up. Gainsbury & Whiting oversaw production. Joseph Bennett returned for set design.

The soundtrack opened with orchestral versions of the Nirvana songs "Come as You Are" and "Smells Like Teen Spirit". The second phase transitioned into classical music by Joseph Haydn and Wolfgang Amadeus Mozart.

=== Catwalk presentation ===
The round stage was dressed in black with a black backdrop, with a large artificial tree in the centre wrapped in dark grey silk, which McQueen said was "for a feeling of protection". The fabric extended from the base of the tree to cover the entire stage. The wrapping was inspired by the artists Christo and Jeanne-Claude, who were known for wrapping buildings and landmarks in fabric for their large-scale, site-specific art installations.

Forty-two looks were presented in two phases. Looks 1 to 23 were entirely black and white, representing the girl in her feral state. During this phase, the tree in the centre was illuminated blue. Models' hair was aggressively backcombed and puffed out sideways from their heads, and their eyebrows were dark and strongly defined. Otherwise, make-up used a nude palette. Dresses tended toward what Thomas called a "Victorian gothic" look. There were several tailored ensembles featuring frock coats and trousers, which author Judith Watt found reminiscent of dandies from the British Regency era. The dark aesthetic reminded author Katherine Gleason of the main character in the 1990 film Edward Scissorhands.

Following Look 23, the lights went down, except on the tree. The stage was briefly empty while the lighting on the tree transitioned to yellow, indicating the start of the second phase. Looks 24 to 42 were richly coloured, with luxurious materials and embellishments, representing the girl's transition into royalty. Silhouettes here resembled the 1950s New Look, with tight waists and exaggerated skirts. Models were styled with antique gem-encrusted necklaces, headpieces, and earrings lent by the New York branch of The Gem Palace of Jaipur, India, a long-standing high-end jewellery atelier. The shoes in this phase were embellished ballet flats, an unusual style for a high fashion runway show. The hair and make-up were more elegant, although with a slight "punk" edge – chignons were placed at the top of the head rather than the nape of the neck, and had hair sticking out at the top, for example. Gold-toned eyeshadow and highlighter matched the decadence of the jewellery and clothing.

=== Notable ensembles ===
Look 10 was a black dress styled with Treacy's peacock headpiece. Look 20, sometimes referred to as the "snowflake dress," was a black mid-length dress with ballerina skirt, fitted with an overlay of black leather laser-cut into snowflakes, set on a background of white silk. Look 22 was a full-skirted dress in black with a white print of a tree. Look 23, the "peacock dress," was similarly full-skirted, in white with a pair of black lace peacocks facing one another on the front and the back. Gleason felt their positioning indicated "courtship and romance".

Raquel Zimmermann wore Look 28, a cropped jacket and close-fitting bodysuit; she explained to interviewers that her masculine outfit represented the prince. Look 29 features a dress with a print of a young Queen Elizabeth II combined with the Union Jack. Curator Andrew Bolton suggested this was a reference to the collage t-shirts which Vivienne Westwood and Malcolm McLaren produced for punk band the Sex Pistols in the 1980s; these featured similar imagery of British national symbols. Looks 34 and 35 had full skirts covered in dyed feathers. Look 39, a dress with a red satin jacket sculpted to resemble rose petals, has been described as one of McQueen's "most structurally complex rose-themed garments". The final ensemble, Look 42, comprised a red satin coat worn over a bejewelled gown in ivory silk, accessorised with an egg-shaped purse in red leather that McQueen termed the "Empire" bag. The bag was decorated with gilt, copper alloy, and Swarovski crystals, and may have been inspired by the jewelled Fabergé eggs made for the Russian imperial family in the late 19th and early 20th centuries. Kristin Knox called the entire ensemble "one of the most iconic dresses" of the collection.

== Reception ==
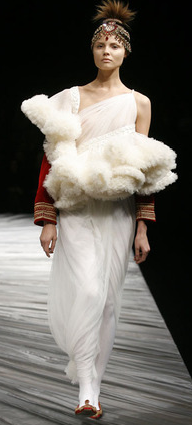
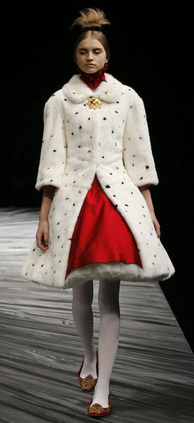
Looks 27 and 31 as shown on the runway

Critical response to The Girl Who Lived in the Tree was positive. Katherine Gleason reported that most critics saw the show as "a triumph". It was the third-most-viewed collection on Style.com that season. Several reviewers found that the decadence and historicism of The Girl Who Lived in the Tree stood out in a relatively sedate and minimalist Paris Fashion Week. Cathy Horyn for The New York Times and Derick Chetty at the Toronto Star each felt the show was a complete success, artistically. Many critics felt that the clothing was both beautiful and commercially viable. Suzy Menkes for International Herald Tribune disagreed with this consensus, saying there was little wearable clothing in the collection, but felt everything was so attractive that "it hardly seemed relevant". Jeanne Beker of The National Post and Joelle Diderich identified the peacock dress as a favourite.

Several reviewers compared the collection positively to McQueen's previous work, even calling it his best. Lisa Armstrong of The Times and Robin Givhan of The Washington Post favourably noted the absence of McQueen's usual aggression; Givhan in particular was pleased that he had avoided personal clichés like face masks and extreme heels. Susannah Frankel of The Independent wrote that the use of flats instead of heels had allowed the models to look "regal rather than rapacious". Sarah Mower for Vogue felt McQueen had overcome his "confining, uptight carapace" to produce work that had a "new sense of lightness and femininity". A staff writer at Women's Wear Daily concurred, writing that McQueen had "expressed in fashion a newfound sense of joy" with the collection. Frankel felt that the collection was aimed at a younger audience than McQueen's last few collections, which she saw as a positive: the intended wearer was "wild at heart and all the more powerful for it".

Critics complimented McQueen's cutting and tailoring skills, particularly in the first phase. Horyn wrote that "McQueen approaches every cut, every detail and choice with the precision of a military campaign". In her Los Angeles Times review, Booth Moore cited "an amazing hourglass shaped jacket with slightly padded hips in black leather with the look of brocade" as an example of McQueen's tailoring ability. Stephen Todd of The Australian highlighted a pair of "trousers cut so tight they looked some kind of elegant instrument of torture". Writing in The Irish Times, Deirdre McQuillan identified the silhouettes created by historicist corsetry as "a salute to empire".

Many reviewers commented on the British Raj inspiration. Several highlighted the extravagant haute couture detailing in the second phase. Armstrong called it "Jane Austen meets Raj" and favourably contrasted the historicist style with the modernist clothing other designers had produced that season. Vanessa Friedman of the Financial Times called it "fit for the Royal Ballet if the production was, say, The Queen Goes to India for the Last Days of the Raj". Horyn found herself impressed by McQueen's ability to communicate British history as "heroic, violent, [and] grand" without resorting to strictly historical clothing. Guy Trebay of The New York Times was more critical, calling the overall aesthetic "Raj Barbie, a creature from a music-hall pantomime". He criticised the use of corsetry, saying it hinted at a "control fetish".

In retrospect, the collection is largely regarded as one of McQueen's best. Watt wrote that this collection proved McQueen "could create magnificent couture at his London atelier." Author Kristin Knox called it "of his most memorable collections of all time". In 2015, curator Kate Bethune recalled it as "one of McQueen's most lyrical and beautiful collections". Thomas wrote that it was a "breathtakingly beautiful collection" and compared it to the best work of the major post-World War II designers Cristóbal Balenciaga, Christian Dior, and Jacques Fath. Another of his biographers, Andrew Wilson, was more critical, calling it "highly artificial...a sweetened fairy-tale mix of the Raj and Royalty".

== Analysis ==
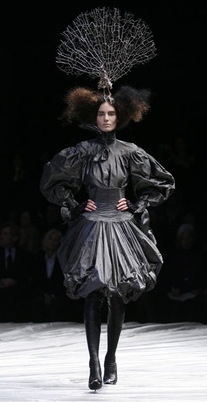
Look 10 with coral and driftwood headpiece by Philip Treacy

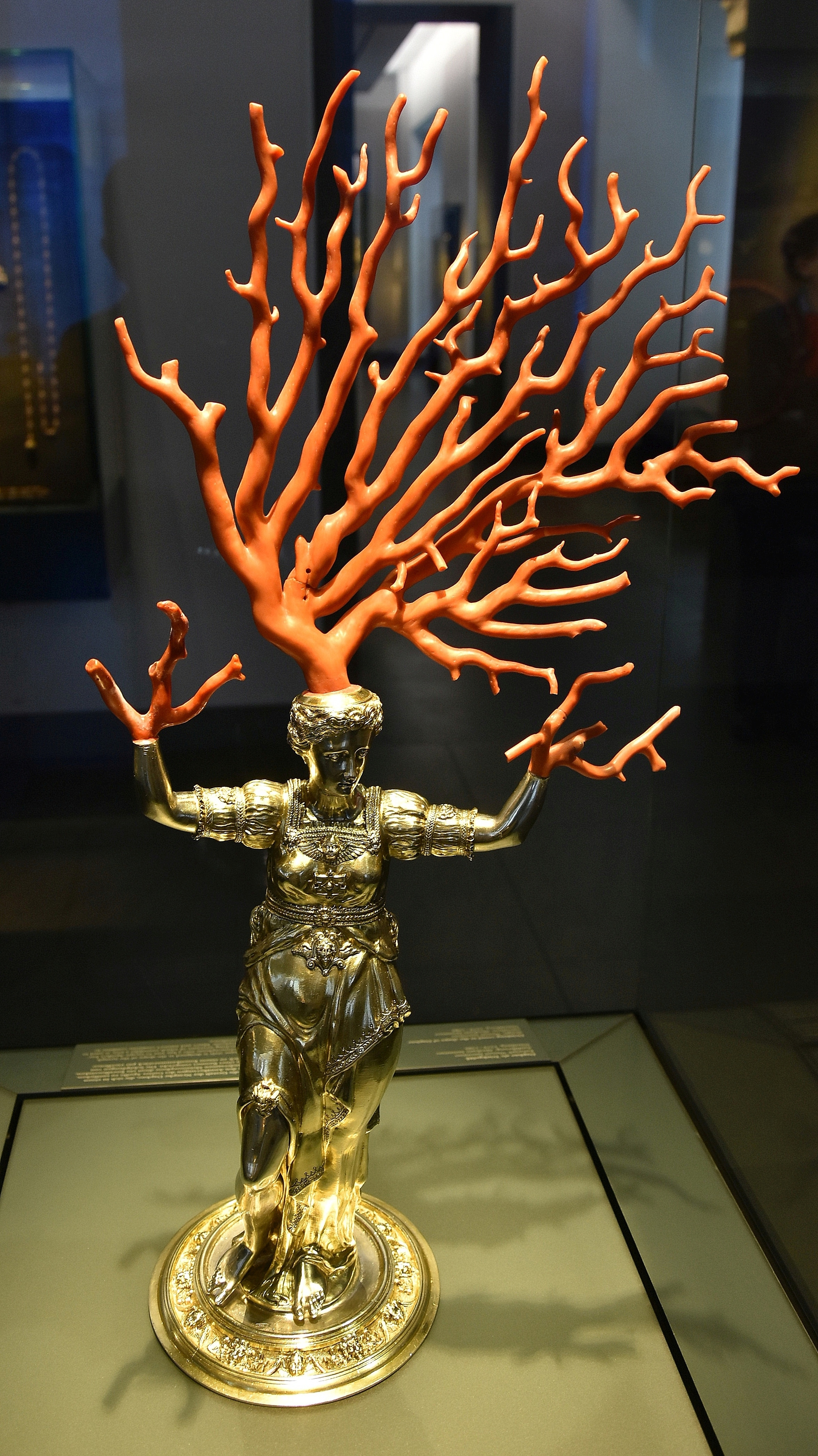
Figurine of Daphne, gold with coral, by Werner and Abraham Jamnitzer, 1570s

Researcher Lisa Skogh noted that McQueen often incorporated concepts and objects which might have appeared in a cabinet of curiosities – collections of natural and historical objects that were the precursor to modern museums. She identified the coral peacock headpiece as one such item, comparing it to a figurine of the nymph Daphne from the 1570s in which Daphne's hair is represented by a large piece of coral.

The theatrical flair of McQueen's designs in The Girl Who Lived in the Tree may have been influenced by his time at costume supplier Berman's & Nathan's. Costume curator Keith Lodwick argued that his work on productions including the long-running musical Les Misérables was reflected in his tailored coats and jackets. He found the collection's waistcoats and decorative gold frogging evocative of the "revolutionary atmosphere of Les Misérables". Dance curator Jane Pritchard suggested that McQueen had been primed to absorb influences from dance costuming, possibly unconsciously. She compared the collection's embellished designs and ballet skirts from to the costumes of the George Balanchine ballet Jewels.

In an essay about McQueen's incorporation of Gothic elements into his work, literature professor Catherine Spooner observed that bodily transformation was a theme he often returned to, especially in his fairy tale narratives such as The Girl Who Lived in the Tree. She contrasted the girl's evolution to many of McQueen's transformed bodies, noting that the narrative in The Girl was a "sweeter version" compared to collections like The Hunger (Spring/Summer 1996) that evoked horror and disgust. Colleen Hill identified the snowflake dress as an example of McQueen drawing on an existing fairy tale, The Snow Queen, but adding "a slightly ominous quality" by incorporating black into the dress, rather than the all-white version mentioned in the original story.

Writer Cassandra Atherton described using several McQueen collections, including The Girl Who Lived in the Tree, in a university-level creative writing course to teach a connection between poetry and fashion, particularly how one can inspire the other.

== Legacy ==
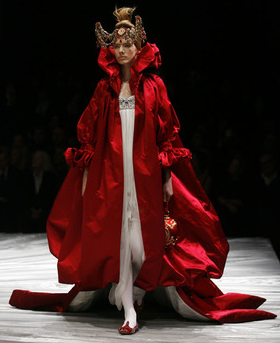
Look 42 as shown on the runway; the "Empire" bag is visible in the model's left hand

Daphne Guinness was photographed in the red robe from Look 42 for the August 2008 issue of Vanity Fair. She was also photographed wearing an ivory silk tulle empire waist gown of her own collection for Harper's Bazaar UK, a variant of one which had appeared on the runway in black as Look 7. Two dresses from the collection were photographed for Vogue: a greyscale tartan dresses from the first phase photographed by Venetia Scott, and the red feathered dress from Look 35 photographed by Emma Summerton.

Actress Salma Hayek wore a copy of the peacock dress from Look 23 to the 2015 opening gala for the V&A staging of Savage Beauty. Playwright James Phillips produced the 2015 semi-biographical play McQueen, which incorporates ideas from the narrative of The Girl Who Lived in the Tree. Women's Wear Daily felt that the Fall 2014 collection designed by Sarah Burton for the Alexander McQueen brand had a similar mood and narrative to The Girl Who Lived in the Tree, writing: "As in that triumphant tale, Burton's heroines journeyed from the shadows into the light". The sculptural rose jacket from Look 39 was an inspiration for Burton's later rose-inspired designs for the house.

In 2010, Jany Temime, the costume designer for Harry Potter and the Deathly Hallows – Part 1, was accused of copying the peacock dress for a wedding dress which appears in the film. Belinda White of The Telegraph called the Harry Potter dress "a blatant rip-off" and wrote that Temime had altered "the crest on the bird's heads to make them more 'phoenixy'", but had left the rest of the design with "rather obvious peacock feathers". The Alexander McQueen brand did not comment on the accusations.

=== Ownership and exhibitions ===
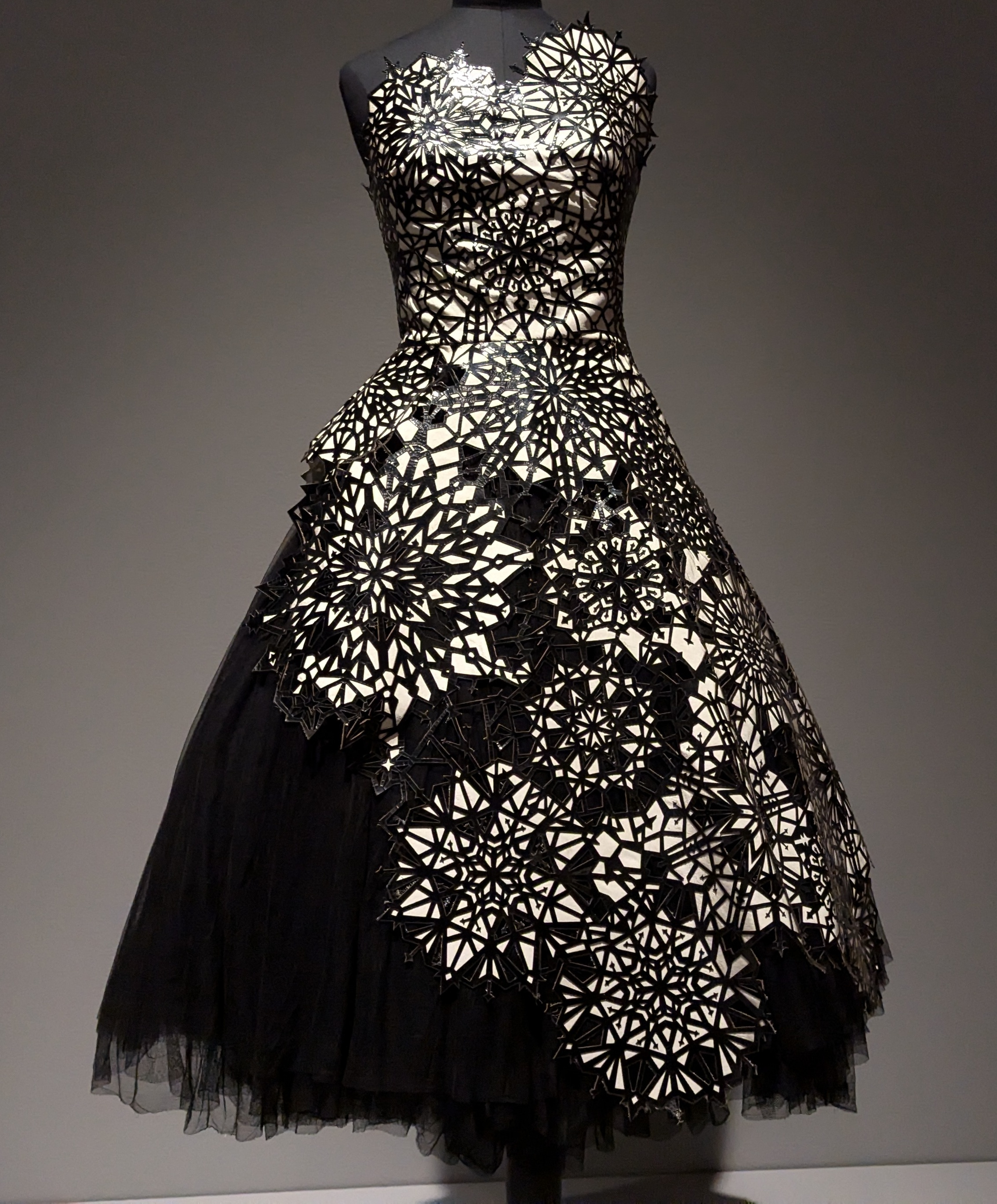
Look 20 pictured at Lee Alexander McQueen & Ann Ray: Rendez-Vous

The Metropolitan Museum of Art (the Met) owns copies of Look 7 and Look 25. The Fashion Institute of Design & Merchandising Museum in Los Angeles owns a commissioned copy of Look 23, the black and white peacock dress; it is one of only three that exist, including the brand's own archived copy. It has appeared in the exhibitions Modern Love (Bendigo Art Gallery, 2013) and India and Beyond (Phoenix Art Museum, 2020). The National Gallery of Victoria owns copies of Look 20, the snowflake dress; and Look 40. Their copy of the snowflake dress had been heavily altered and had large stains, necessitating extensive fabric restoration to restore its original appearance.

McQueen's friend Daphne Guinness auctioned part of her fashion archive in 2012, including the ivory tulle dress she had worn for Harper's Bazaar UK. Pop star Lady Gaga purchased this item for £85,250 (US$133,075); it was the highest amount paid at auction for a McQueen at that time. Fashion collector Jennifer Zuiker auctioned her McQueen collection in 2020, including one piece from The Girl Who Lived in the Tree. A black dress with neck ruffles, Look 5 on the runway, sold for a reported $4,375.

A number of looks from The Girl Who Lived in the Tree appeared in Alexander McQueen: Savage Beauty, a retrospective exhibition of McQueen's designs shown in 2011 at the Met and in 2015 at Victoria and Albert Museum (the V&A). They comprised a large portion of the exhibit's "Romantic Nationalism" section. Looks 24, 26, 27, 39, and 42 appeared in both. The peacock headdress was featured in the Cabinet of Curiosities. Look 35, a red ballet dress, was added for the 2015 staging. Look 29, the dress with photos of Queen Elizabeth II, appeared in the 2013 exhibition Punk: Chaos to Couture at the Met as an example of how fashion absorbed ideas, such as ironically co-opting monarchical imagery, from punk subculture. Look 39, with its sculptural rose petal jacket, appeared in a 2019 exhibition called Roses at the Alexander McQueen Old Bond Street store. Lee Alexander McQueen: Mind, Mythos, Muse, an exhibition first staged at the Los Angeles County Museum of Art in 2022, featured Look 7 from the runway show as well as several items from the retail collection: a black minidress with a similar tree pattern to Look 22, a cream minidress with embroidery of birds and branches, and a black blouse.

== Bibliography ==
- Atherton, Cassandra (2012). "The Haunting: Poetry and Fashion in the Creative Writing Workshop". Writing on the Edge. 23 (1): 47–53. ISSN 1064-6051. JSTOR 43157472.
- Bolton, Andrew (2011). Alexander McQueen: Savage Beauty. New York City: Metropolitan Museum of Art. ISBN 978-1-58839-412-5. OCLC 687693871.
- Bolton, Andrew (2013). Punk: Chaos to Couture. New York City: Metropolitan Museum of Art. ISBN 978-1-58839-489-7. OCLC 844976188.
- Crowe, Lauren Goldstein (2010). Isabella Blow: A Life in Fashion. New York City: Thomas Dunne Books. ISBN 978-1-4299-8538-3.
- Esguerra, Clarissa M.; Hansen, Michaela (2022). Lee Alexander McQueen: Mind, Mythos, Muse. New York City: Delmonico Books. ISBN 978-1-63681-018-8. OCLC 1289986708.
- Fairer, Robert; Wilcox, Claire (2016). Alexander McQueen: Unseen. New Haven, Connecticut: Yale University Press. ISBN 978-0-300-22267-8. OCLC 946216643.
- Fox, Chloe (2012). Vogue On: Alexander McQueen. Vogue on Designers. London: Quadrille Publishing. ISBN 978-1849491136. OCLC 828766756.
- Gleason, Katherine (2012). Alexander McQueen: Evolution. New York City: Race Point Publishing. ISBN 978-1-61058-837-9. OCLC 783147416.
- Haye, Amy de la (2020). The Rose in Fashion: Ravishing. New Haven, Connecticut: Yale University Press. ISBN 978-0-300-25008-4. Archived from the original on 14 January 2023.
- Hill, Colleen (2016). Fairy Tale Fashion. New Haven: Yale University Press. ISBN 978-0-300-21802-2. OCLC 920017513.
- Homer, Karen (2023). Little Book of Alexander McQueen: The Story of the Iconic Brand. London: Welbeck Publishing Group. ISBN 978-1-80279-270-6.
- Knox, Kristin (2010). Alexander McQueen: Genius of a Generation. London: A&C Black. ISBN 978-1-4081-3223-4. OCLC 794296806.
- Mora, Juliana Luna; Berry, Jess (2 September 2022). "Creative Direction Succession in Luxury Fashion: The Illusion of Immortality at Chanel and Alexander McQueen". Luxury. 9 (2–3): 117–140. doi:10.1080/20511817.2022.2194039. ISSN 2051-1817.
- Thomas, Dana (2015). Gods and Kings: The Rise and Fall of Alexander McQueen and John Galliano. New York City: Penguin Publishing. ISBN 978-1-101-61795-3. OCLC 951153602.
- Watt, Judith (2012). Alexander McQueen: The Life and the Legacy. New York City: Harper Design. ISBN 978-1-84796-085-6. OCLC 892706946.
- Wilcox, Claire, ed. (2015). Alexander McQueen. New York City: Abrams Books. ISBN 978-1-4197-1723-9. OCLC 891618596.
  - Bethune, Kate. "Encyclopedia of Collections". In Wilcox (2015), pp. 303–326.
  - Miller, Janice. "Making-Up". In Wilcox (2015), pp. 234–241.
  - Lodwick, Keith. "Coup de Théâtre". In Wilcox (2015), pp. 247–251.
  - Persson, Helen. "Walking Out". In Wilcox (2015), pp. 110–115.
  - Pritchard, Jane. "Dance". In Wilcox (2015), pp. 252–257.
  - Skogh, Lisa. "Museum of the Mind". In Wilcox (2015), pp. 178–188.
  - Spooner, Catherine. "A Gothic Mind". In Wilcox (2015), pp. 141–158.
- Wilson, Andrew (2015). Alexander McQueen: Blood Beneath the Skin. New York City: Simon and Schuster. ISBN 978-1-4767-7674-3. OCLC 1310585849.
