= Kheri (footwear) =

Traditional leather sandal from Pakistan

The kheri, (Note: Punjabi/Urdu: کھیڑی) also known as Peshawari chappal, Peshawari kheri, Zari chappal, Captaan chappal, Chakwali chappal, Kohati chappal, and various other names, is a traditional sandal originating from Pakistan. The shoes are worn by men casually or formally, usually with the shalwar kameez, and is often regarded as the national footwear of Pakistan. The major centres of production of kheris are in Peshawar, Hazro, Chakwal, Sargodha, Dera Ismail Khan, Talagang, Kohat, and other cities in Punjab and Khyber Pakhtunkhwa in northwestern Pakistan.

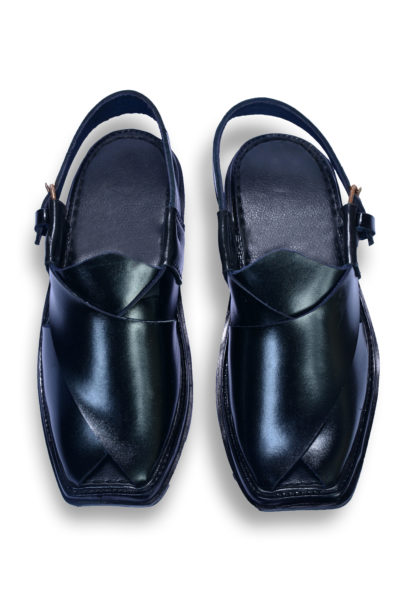
A typical kheri

== Description ==
It is a semi-closed shoe which consists of two wide straps crossed and joined with the sole, plus a heel strap with a buckle to tie according to the foot size and level of comfort. It is traditionally made with pure leather with its sole often made from a truck tyre or from a soft leather which is sewn onto the rubber tire sole. The materials are cheap, easily available and very hard-wearing. It is available in many traditional designs and colours with various variations such as gold and silver embroidery, which give the shoe a more elegant look. Intricate designs are added to the leather upper before the shoe is put into a mold which stretches it to size. Because of their comfort, they are worn in place of sandals or slippers in Pakistan.

== History ==
The origins of the kheri, also known as Peshawari chappal after its one of the largest production centre, Peshawar, are rooted in the artisan traditions of the northern Punjab. Unlike the soft leather jutti worn in the plains of Punjab, the kheri originated in the hill tracts to withstand rugged topography; a limestone ridge in Rawalpindi, the Khairimár, was even named "The Sandal Breaker" due to its ability to destroy the kheri soles of travelers. British colonial gazetteers documented its widespread use across the districts of Attock, Jhelum (including Chakwal), Shahpur, (covering Sargodha and Khushab), and Rawalpindi.

Kheris have become increasingly popular in Khyber Pakhtunkhwa region of Pakistan. Cities like Chakwal and Talagang remain a major production hub, to export traditional hand-stitched kheris internationally.

During the early 20th centuries, the design moved along trade routes into the urban centers of the northwest. Following the independence of Pakistan in 1947, in Peshawar, the craft was further refined with softer leathers and more intricate finishes, leading to the kheri being renamed "Peshawari chappal". Raverty’s 1860 Pashto dictionary records the terms "chaplí" and "kheṛ" as being borrowed from Punjabi.

== Popularity ==
In 2014, British designer Paul Smith released a sandal similar to the Peshawari chappal priced at approximately £300, prompting criticism in Pakistan and leading the brand to acknowledge that the design was inspired by the traditional footwear.

In 2019, French fashion designer Christian Louboutin introduced a sandal called the "Imran Sandal", inspired by the Peshawari chappal and featuring the brand's signature red sole. The design sparked debate online, with some critics accusing the brand of cultural appropriation while others saw it as bringing global recognition to the traditional sandal.

A modern variation known as the Kaptaan chappal gained popularity in 2015 after a pair was presented to Pakistani politician Imran Khan.

The Peshawari chappal is widely regarded as a symbol of traditional Pashtun dress and is commonly worn during weddings, cultural events and religious festivals across Pakistan.

== See also ==
- Pakistani dress
- Khussa
- List of shoe styles
