= Fin Kennedy =

English playwright and teacher

- Education: Goldsmiths, University of London
- Occupations: Playwright, Teacher, University tutor
- Website: Official Website

Fin Kennedy is an English playwright, teacher, and university tutor, specializing in writing for youth and marginalized communities. He writes for both adults and teenagers and his plays are regularly produced in the UK and worldwide. Kennedy is also a teacher of playwriting and a community arts project manager, with a particular focus on young people's projects in London's East End. Occasionally, he contributes with blog articles about the intersection of drama, politics, and society for The Guardian. In 2021, he founded the Applied Storied company.

== Education ==
Kennedy graduated from the MA Writing for Performance program at Goldsmiths, University of London.

== Biography ==
=== 2003–2006: Early theatrical works ===
Fin's initial play, "Protection," debuted at Soho Theatre in 2003, where he concurrently served as Pearson writer-in-residence. The play was rated 3/5 by the Guardian and was cited as "Kennedy's achievement is to focus on a specific family services group without losing sight of the big political picture."

His second work, "How To Disappear Completely and Never Be Found" earned the 38th Arts Council John Whiting Award and premiered at Sheffield Crucible in 2007. It was based on the book of the same name. The play has since been staged in London, the United States, and Australia, gaining popularity among student and amateur performance groups. It stands as one of the most frequently licensed plays by Nick Hern Books.

Fin's first two plays tailored for teenagers, "Locked In" and "We Are Shadows," were staged by Half Moon Young People’s Theatre in 2006 and 2008, respectively, touring nationally and marking the beginning of his extensive involvement in writing for young audiences.

=== 2007–2012: Writer-in-residence at Mulberry School for Girls ===
From 2007 onward, Fin has held the position of writer-in-residence at Mulberry School for Girls in Tower Hamlets. He co-founded Mulberry Theatre Company, contributing seven plays to their repertoire. Works such as "Mehndi Night" (2007), "Stolen Secrets" (2008), and "The Unravelling" (2009) premiered at the Edinburgh Festival Fringe, with "The Urban Girl’s Guide to Camping" debuting at Southwark Playhouse in 2010. All of these plays are published by Nick Hern Books in "The Urban Girl’s Guide to Camping and other plays."

Notably, Mulberry Theatre Company made history in 2009 when they received a Scotsman Fringe First for "The Unravelling," marking the first time a British state school has been honoured with this award. Fin's contributions extend to radio, with three Afternoon Plays broadcast on BBC Radio 4, including "The Good Listener," a recurring series set inside Government Communications Headquarters and "On Kosovo Field" which was inspired by PJ Harvey's Kosovan notebook and starred the voices of Michelle Keegan and Nico Mirallegro.

His fifth play for Mulberry School, "The Dream Collector," premiered in Mulberry’s new onsite theatre in October 2013, followed by the debut of "The Domino Effect" at the 2014 Edinburgh Festival Fringe. Both plays are featured in "The Domino Effect and other plays for teenagers."

=== 2013–2020: Co-Artistic Director at Tamasha Theatre Company ===
In 2013, Kennedy left his position at Mulberry School and joined Tamasha Theatre Company as co-Artistic Director. Within Tamasha, Kennedy established Tamasha Playwrights, a collective and agency led by writers that prioritize diversity, fostering the launch of numerous playwrights' careers. In his role as Artistic Director, he oversaw the production and dramaturgy of national tours, including Sudha Bhuchar's "My Name Is" in 2013 and Emteaz Hussain's "Blood" in 2015. Additionally, he contributed to Satinder Chohan's "Made in India", Ishy Din's "Approaching Empty" in 2019, Zia Ahmed's "I Wanna Be Yours" in 2019, and the touring audio installation "Under The Mask" by Shaan Sahota at Oxford Playhouse in 2021. He served here till 2021. In the following year, he joined The Guardian as a contributor where he writes vlogs about the intersection of drama, politics, theatre and society where he still occasionally contributes.

=== 2021-present: Launch of Applied Stories ===
In 2021, Kennedy launched the Applied Stories company, a digital production company and consultancy that specialises in creating place-based audio dramas with an emphasis on social impact. The company launched a "Museum of Stories" app which includes 12 audio tales based on true stories about the Bury Park area with plans to expand to other areas in Luton.
