= Ballet shoe =

Soft shoe worn for ballet dancing

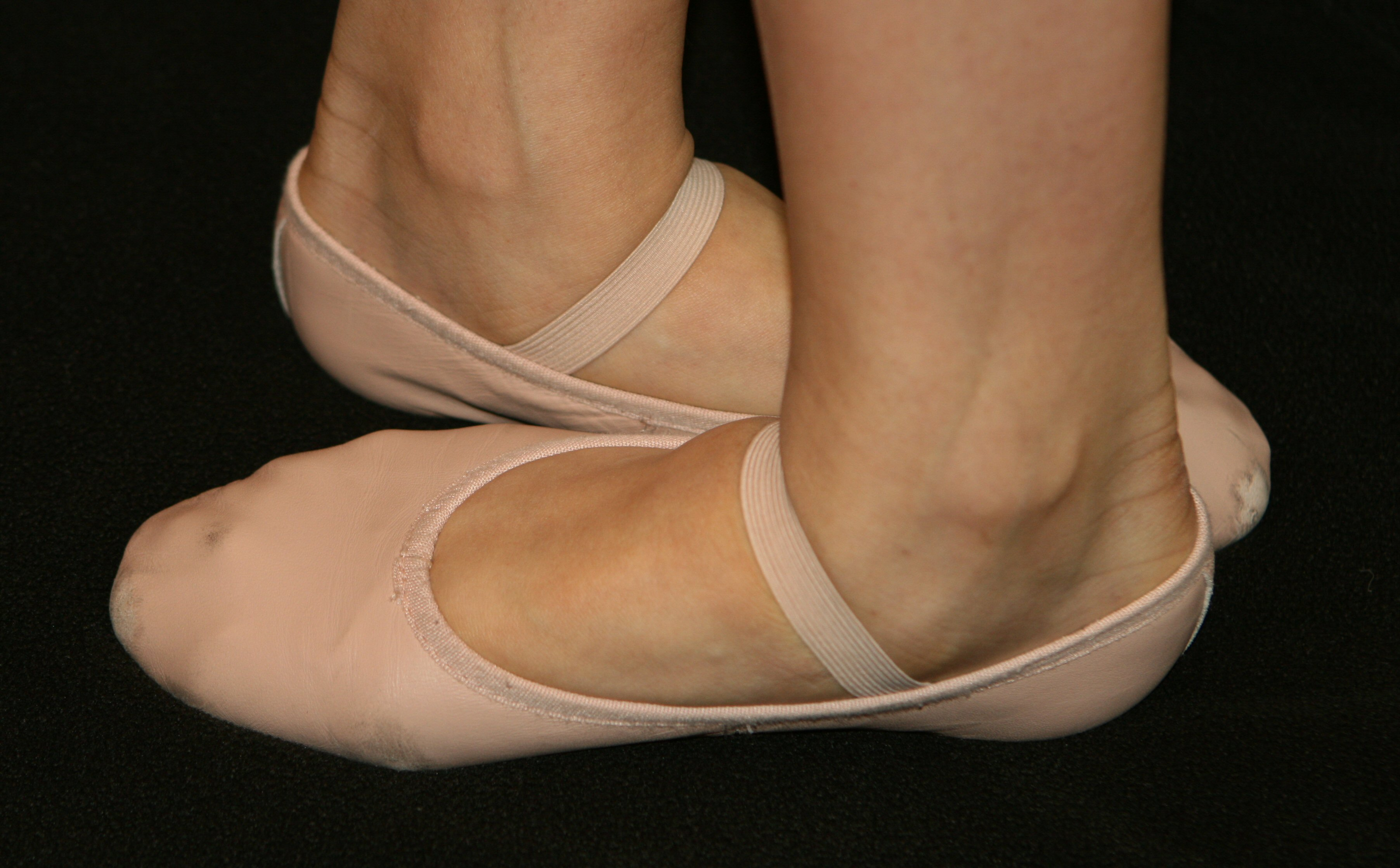
Leather ballet shoes, with feet shown in fifth position

A ballet shoe, or ballet slipper, is a lightweight shoe designed specifically for ballet dancing. It may be made from soft leather, canvas, or satin, and has flexible, thin full or split soles. Traditionally, women wear pink shoes and men wear white or black shoes. Skin-colored slippers—which are unobtrusive and thus give the appearance of dancing barefoot—are worn in modern ballets and sometimes modern dancing by both men and women.

Typically, in a ballet class, male dancers wear ballet slippers throughout the class whereas female dancers wear ballet slippers at the beginning and then may change into pointe shoes.

== Construction ==
Ballet shoes traditionally have a leather sole that does not reach all the way to the edges of the shoe. A modern development is the split sole, which provides greater flexibility and emphasizes the shape of the foot when pointed. They are usually made from soft leather, canvas or satin. Leather shoes are long-lasting. Canvas shoes are less expensive but wear faster than average leather ballet shoes. Satin shoes are often used for performances but can wear out very quickly.

Shoes are secured with the use of elastic, most often with a single band across the arch of the foot, or with two bands that cross in an "X" shape at the top of the arch. In the case of double band shoes, some ballet slipper manufacturers will attach one end of each band to the shoe as part of the production process, and leave it to the purchaser to attach the free ends of the bands for optimal fit.

== History ==
Women began to dance ballet in 1682, twenty years after King Louis XIV of France ordered the founding of the Royal Academy of Dance. At that time, the standard women's ballet shoe had heels. Mid-18th century dancer Marie Camargo of the Paris Opéra Ballet was the first to wear a non-heeled shoe. After the French Revolution, heels were completely eliminated from standard ballet shoes, and they were replaced with the ballet flats we have today.

== See also ==
- Pointe shoe
- Footwear
- Ballet
- Ballet boot
- List of shoe styles
- Jutti
