= The Rubenstein Kiss =

Play by James Phillips

The Rubenstein Kiss is the debut play by British playwright James Phillips, and the winner of the John Whiting Award and the TMA Award for Best New Play.

The play, set in the 1950s and the 1970s, was inspired by an iconic photograph of the nuclear spies Julius and Ethel Rosenberg. It was premiered in 2005 at the Hampstead Theatre, London, starring Samantha Bond, Will Keen, Gary Kemp, and Martin Hutson.

The play had its North American premiere on February 3, 2012, in Columbus, Ohio.
