= How to Disappear Completely and Never Be Found =

1985 book by Doug Richmond

- Author: Doug Richmond
- Language: English
- Publisher: Carol Publishing Group
- Publication date: 1985
- Publication place: United States
- Media type: Print
- ISBN: 9780806515595

How to Disappear Completely and Never Be Found is a how-to book by Doug Richmond, originally released in 1985.

== Summary ==
The book is a guide on starting a new identity. It includes chapters on planning a disappearance, arranging for new identification, finding work, establishing credit, pseudocide (creating the impression of one's own death), and more. The book recommends a method of disappearing by assuming the identity of a dead person with similar vital statistics and age, and also includes a section on avoiding paper trails which, due to the age of the book, may no longer be relevant or useful.

== Adaptations ==
A play inspired by the book was released in 2005 by Fin Kennedy, about a man wanting to disappear, which won the John Whiting Award.

== In popular culture ==
The Polish ambient music collective How To Disappear Completely is named after the book.

The title of the Radiohead song "How to Disappear Completely" off their album Kid A (2000) was inspired by the book.
