= Kung fu shoe =

Chinese shoes used in Chinese martial arts

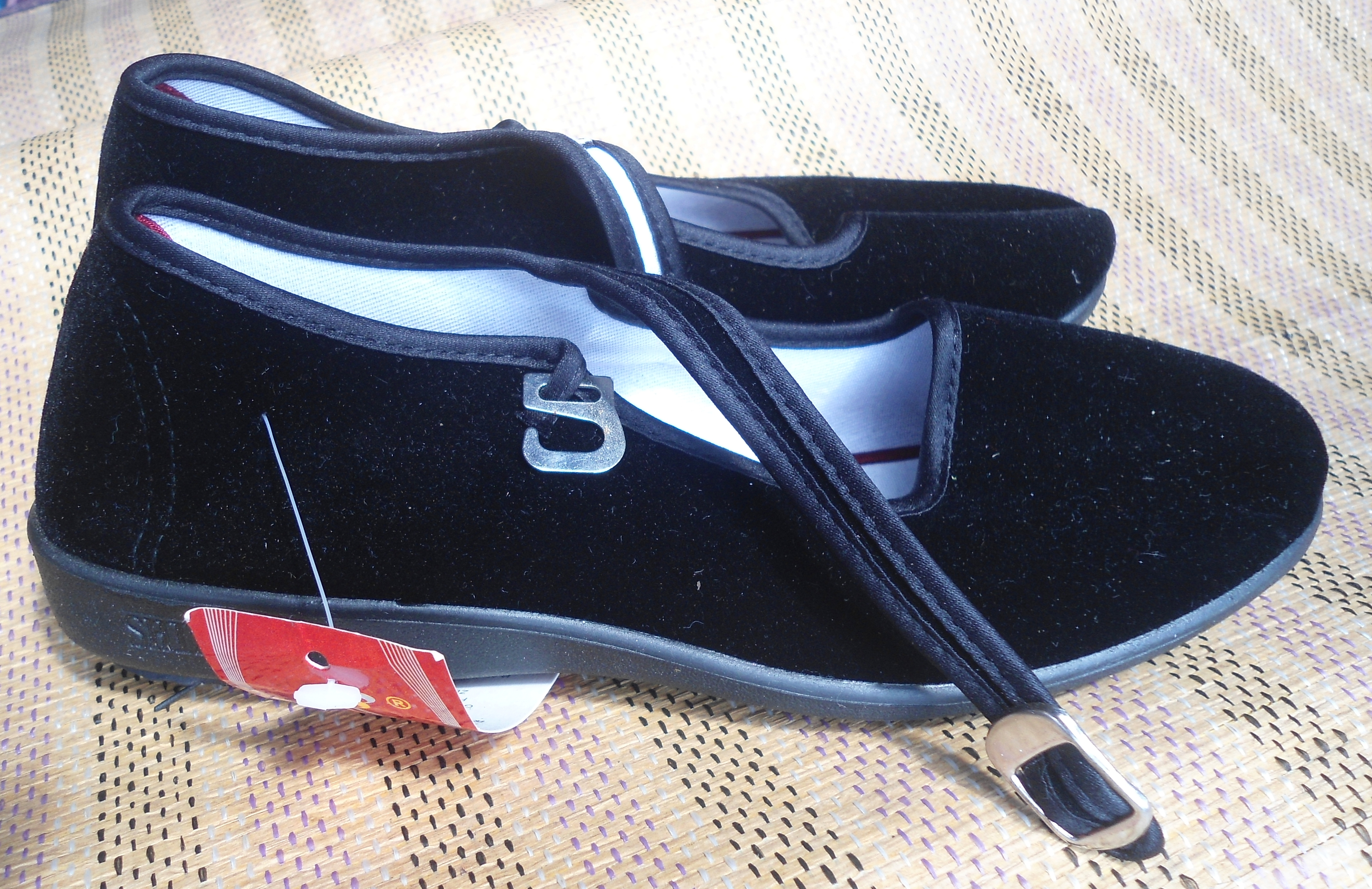
Women's

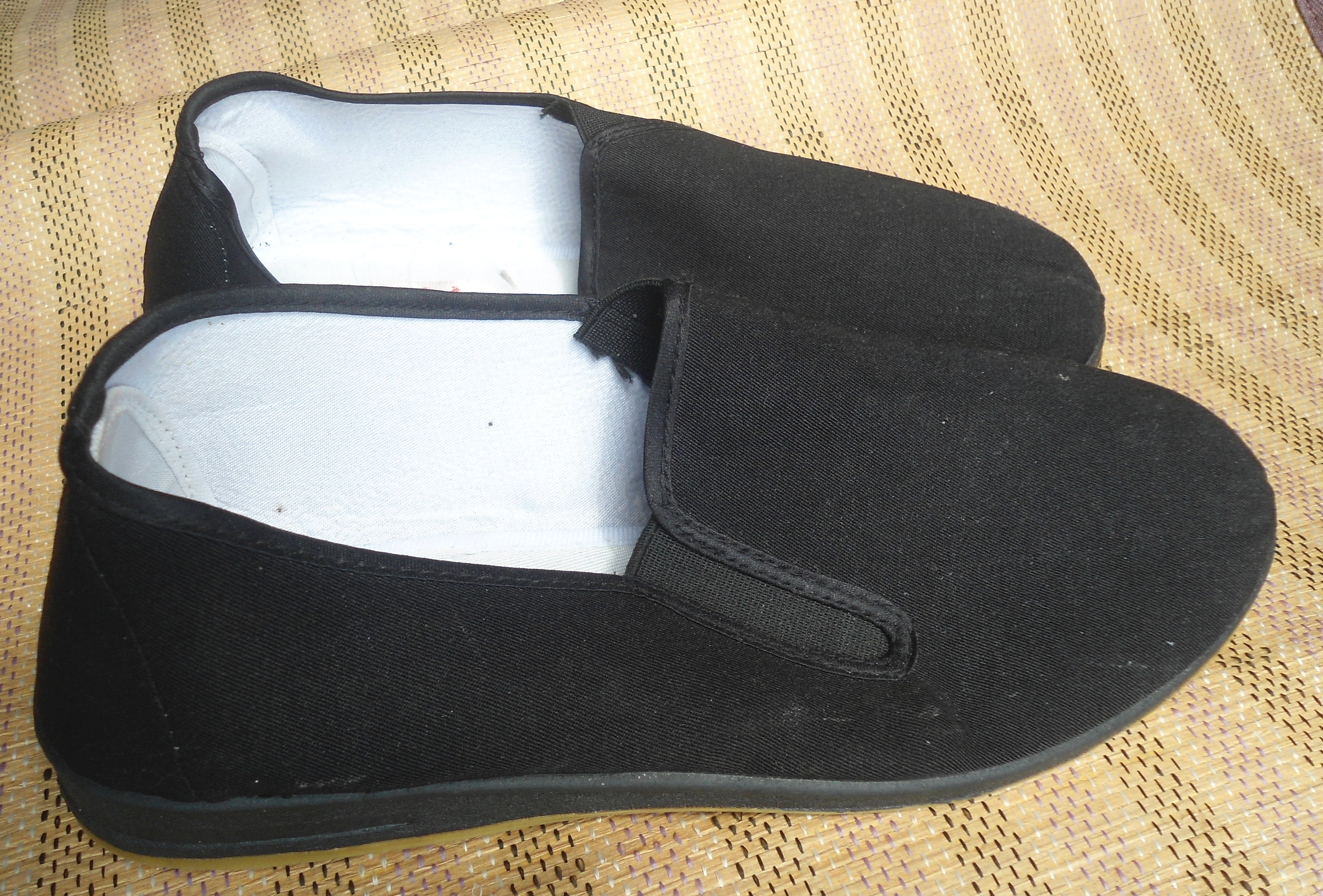
Men's

Kung fu shoes at a shop in Haikou, Hainan, China

The kung fu shoe, also known as a "tai chi shoe" or as a "martial arts slipper", is a type and style of cloth slip-on shoe that is traditionally made in China, and was originally worn while practicing kung fu and other martial arts, and also while performing tai chi.

Variants of this shoe are now mass-produced for general-purpose wear, and there are several slightly different styles. These shoes are inexpensive and are available worldwide.

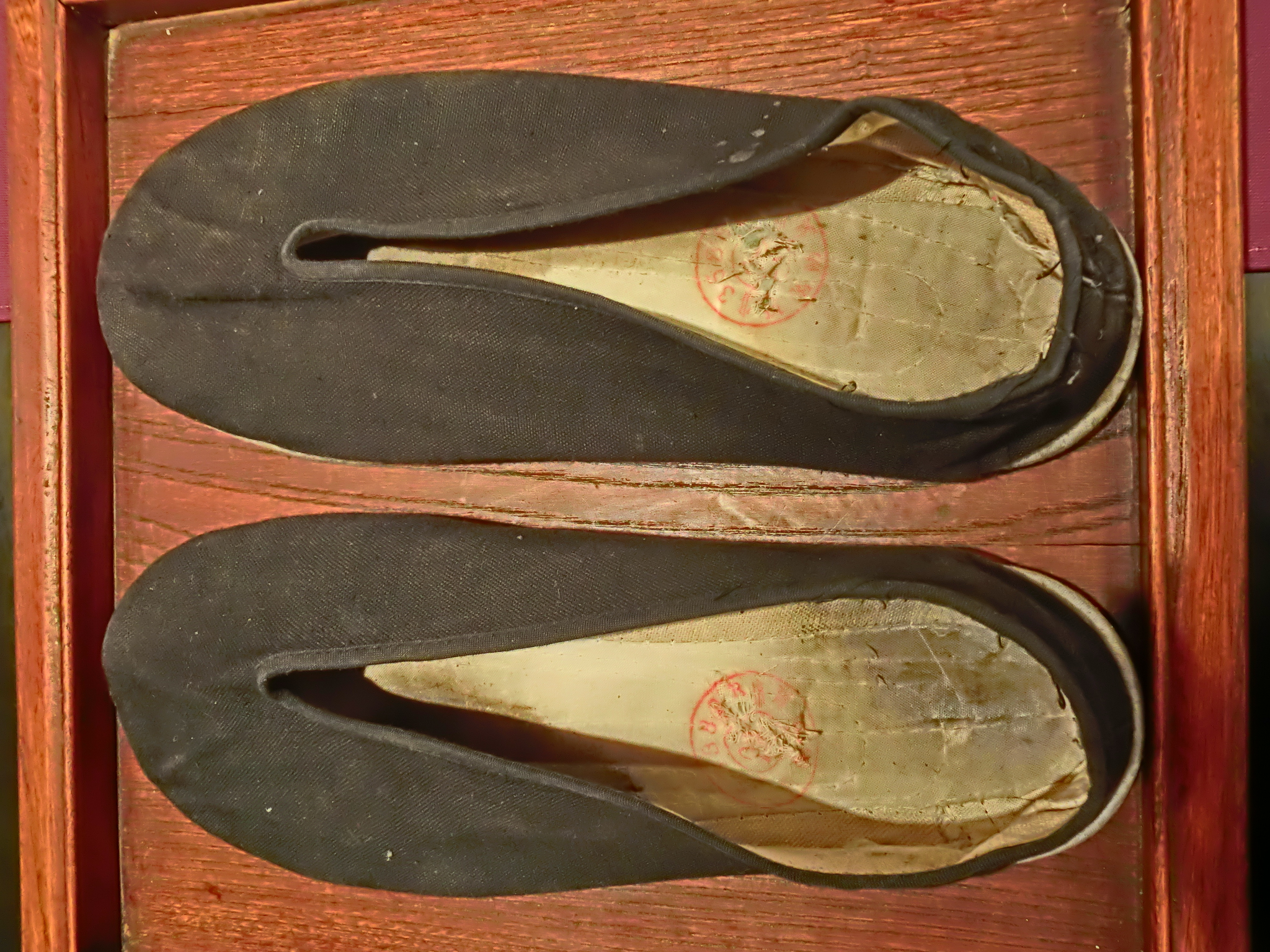
Kung fu shoes once owned by Bruce Lee

One common kind is cheaply produced and is typically black, with minimal lining; it has a low-sided cloth upper, and a pale brown hard plastic sole. One variant is made as a lace-up shoe rather than a slip-on shoe. A version of the shoe for girls and women has a buckle strap and resembles the Mary Jane shoe. Some varieties of the kung fu shoe have reinforced cotton soles instead of plastic ones, and some have rubber soles.

== Military use ==
Kung fu shoes were used by the low-ranking troops of the National Revolutionary Army during the Northern Expedition and Encirclement Campaigns. Following the resumed alliance of the KMT and the Chinese communists, the Kung fu shoes was widely worn by the troops from autonomous Communist formations (such as the New Fourth Army and the Eighth Route Army) of NRA. While straw slippers were issued as a stop-gap especially for new recruits, troops from German-trained NRA Divisions rather used leather shoes while their officers used leather boots.

== See also ==
- List of shoe styles
- Espadrille, a similar kind of shoe originating from the Pyrenees.
- Japanese tabi, one variety of which is soft cloth shoes.
- Jutti, North Indian shoes.
