= Sindhi Mojari =

Traditional South Asian footwear

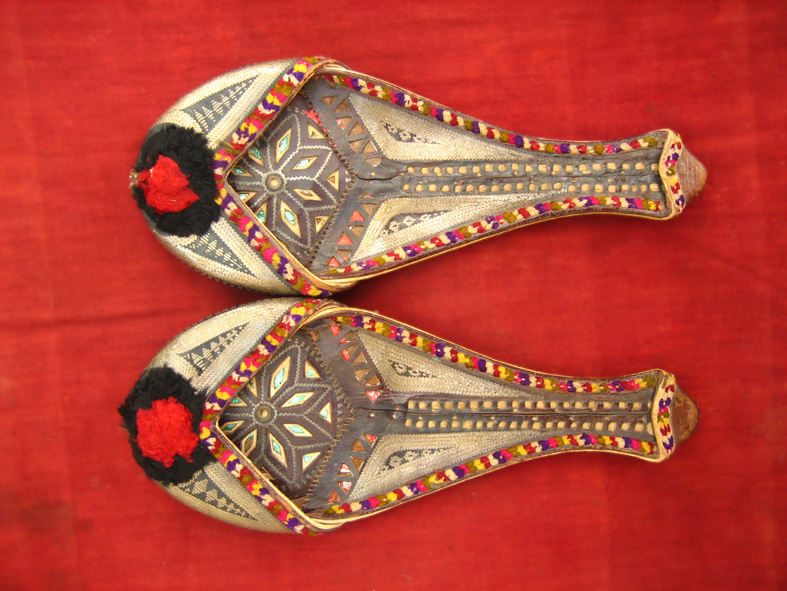
Sindhi Mojari

Sindhi Mojari (or simply Mojari) is a type of handcrafted footwear of mule style produced in India and Pakistan. They are traditionally made by artisans mostly using tanned leather. The uppers are made of one piece of leather or textile embroidered and embellished with brass nails, cowry shells, mirrors, bells and ceramic beads. The bonding from the upper to the sole is done by cotton thread that is eco-friendly and enmeshes the leather fibers to strengthen the bonds. Some product range also uses bright and ornate threads.

As it evolved through the centuries and is being produced by individual artisans, products vary in designs and colours. It encapsulates cultural diversity, local ethos and ethnicity.

== History ==
It is believed that one of the earliest examples of footwear worn on the Indian subcontinent is a sandal of wood, datable to circa 200 BC. During the 3rd and 4th Centuries in the Buddhist period, it was quite common to wear strapped sandals, and Indian kings wore sandals ornamented with precious jewels. Jain literature shows that leather was used for the making of shoes, which protected the toes from getting injured. Hides of cows, buffaloes, goats, sheep and other wild animals were used.

== Origin ==
The Mojari originated under the Muslim rule in the Mughal Empire where it was decorated with colours, gems, and other ornaments as part of the Mughal Clothing. They are said to have been popularized under the Mughal King Saleem Shah as a result. In Pakistan, they are also commonly worn with Pakistan's national dress Shalwar Kameez.

== Gallery ==
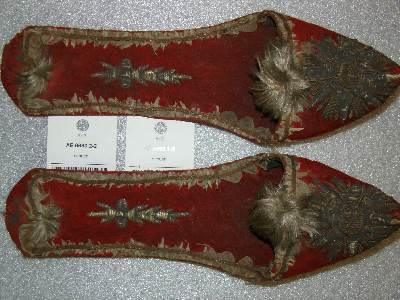

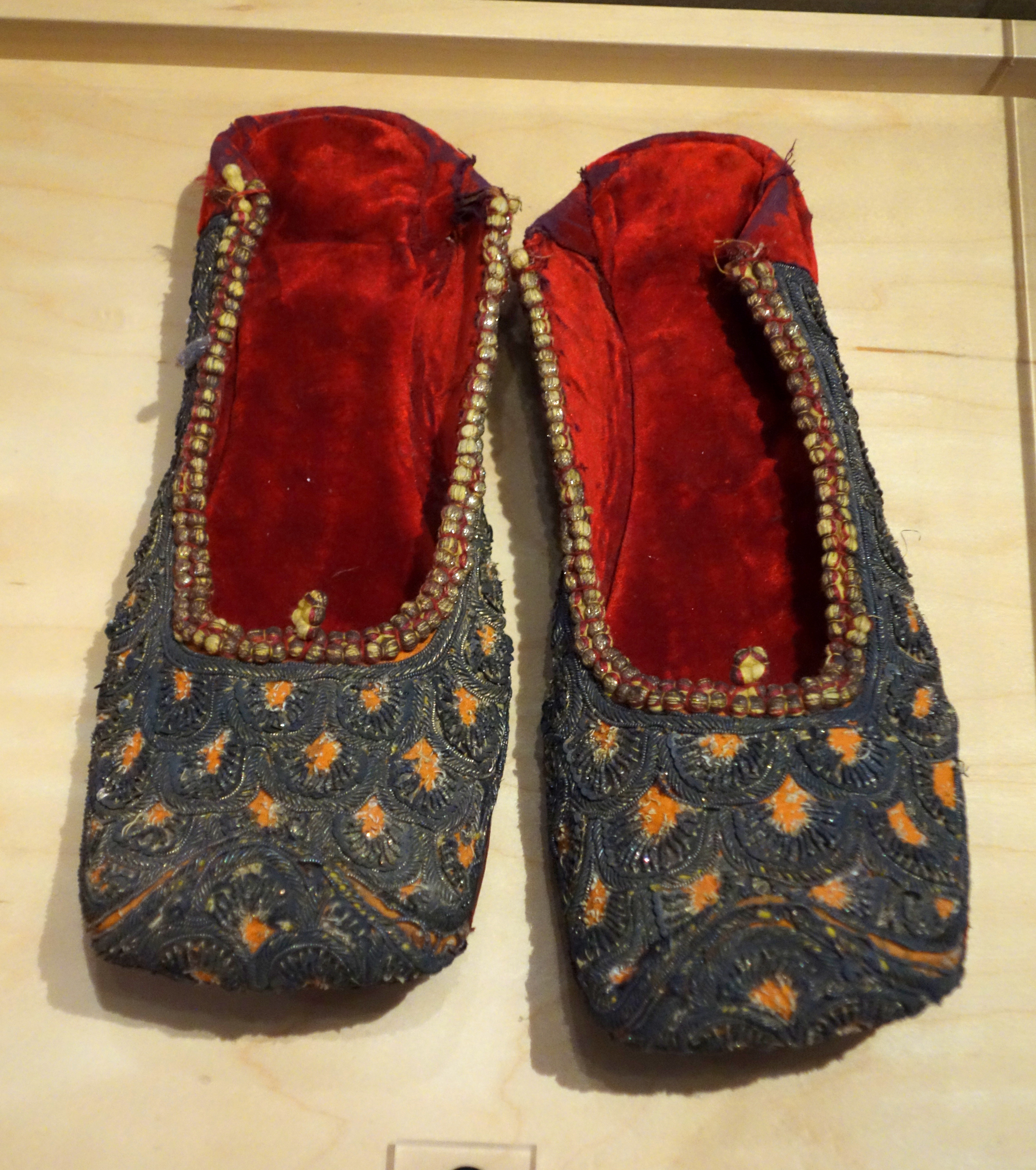
Indian Mojari, 19th century, red velvet with gold embroidery and sequins

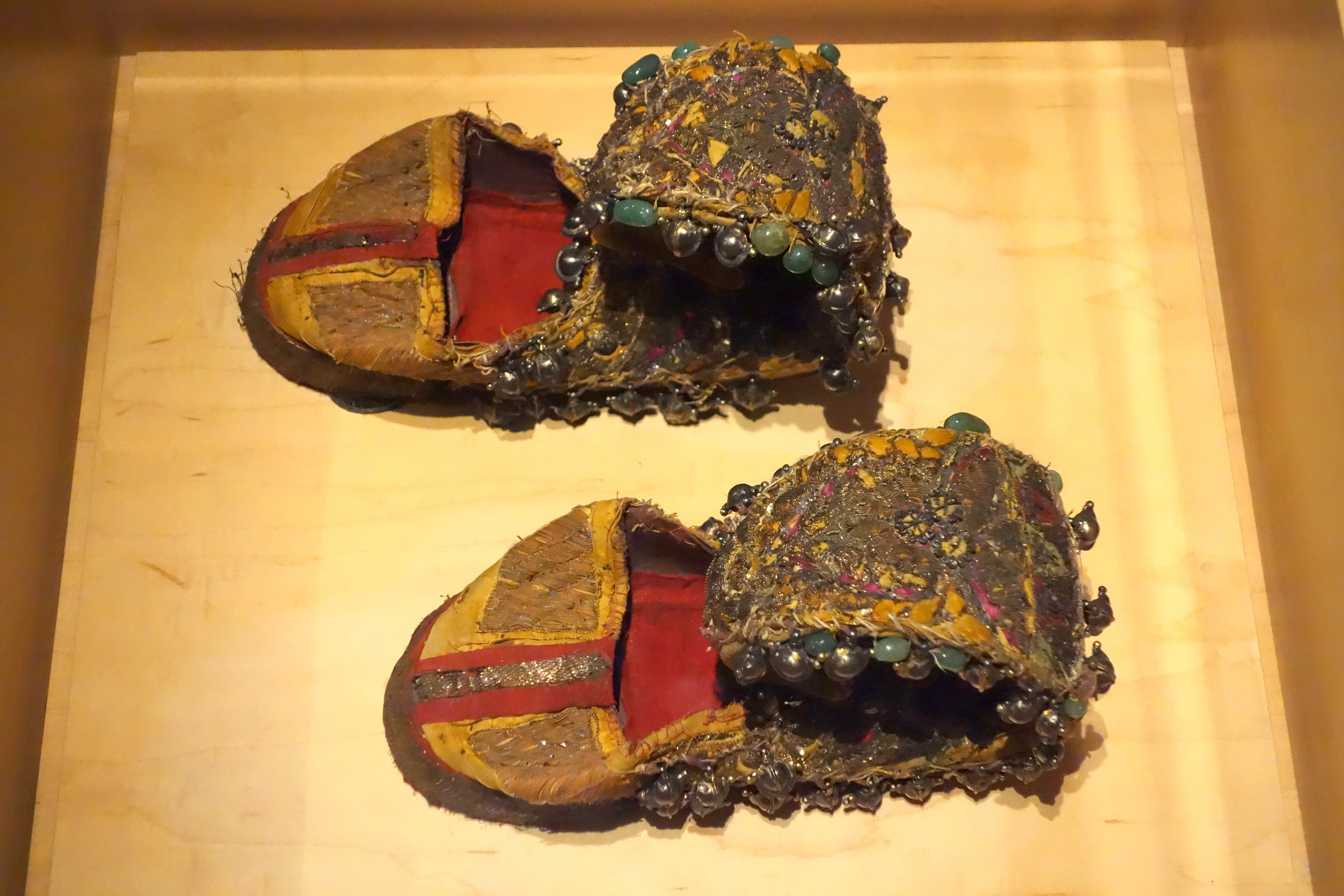

== See also ==
- List of shoe styles
- Jutti
- Kolhapuri chappal
- Khussa
- Paduka
