= John Whiting Award =

British playwright award

Between 1965 and 2010, the John Whiting Award (from 2007 renamed the Peter Wolff Trust Supports the John Whiting Award) was awarded annually to a British or Commonwealth playwright who, in the opinion of a consortium of UK theatres, showed a new and distinctive development in dramatic writing with particular relevance to contemporary society. The award was established in 1965 to commemorate John Whiting and his distinctive contribution to post-war British theatre. Until 2006, the selection was made by the drama panel of Arts Council England, and the play did not need to have been staged, which allowed plays produced on radio to be considered.

From 2007, only plays which had been performed in the subsidised sector were eligible. The award was initially worth £1000, but grew to £6000 per year. From 2007, the award was supplied by the Peter Wolff Theatre Trust and was administered by a consortium of UK theatres which specialise in new writing.

The theatres involved were:

- Birmingham Repertory Theatre
- Bush Theatre, London
- Cleanbreak, London
- Hampstead Theatre, London
- Liverpool Everyman
- Liverpool Playhouse
- Nottingham Playhouse
- Nuffield Theatre, Southampton
- Paines Plough, London (touring)
- Royal Court Theatre, London
- Sgript Cymru, Cardiff
- Soho Theatre, London
- Tamasha Theatre Company, London
- Traverse Theatre, Edinburgh

Winners of the John Whiting Award
Year	Playwright	Play
1967	Tom Stoppard	Rosencrantz and Guildenstern are Dead
1967	Wole Soyinka	The Interpreters
1967	Peter Nichols	A Day in the Death of Joe Egg
1968	Peter Barnes	The Ruling Class
1968	Edward Bond	Narrow Road to the Deep North
1969	Howard Brenton	Christie in Love
1970	Freehold Company and Peter Hulton (joint)	Freehold on Antigone
1971	Mustapha Matura	As Time Goes By
1972	Heathcote Williams	AC/DC
1973	John Arden	
1974	David Rudkin	
1975		
1976	David Edgar	Destiny
1977	David Lan	The Winter Dancers
1978	David Halliwell	Prejudice
1978	Snoo Wilson	The Glad Hand
1979	Stephen Bill	The Old Order
1980	Vince Foxall	Gestures
1981	David Pownall	Beef
1982	Karim Alrawi	Migrations
1983	Peter Flannery	Our Friends in the North
1984	Ron Hutchinson	The Rat in the Skull
1985	Guy Hibbert	On the Edge
1985	Heidi Thomas	Shamrocks & Crocodiles
1986	Nick Dear	The Art of Success
1987		
1988	Iain Heggie	American Bagpipes
1989	Billy Roche	A Handful of Stars
1990
1990	Lucy Gannon	Keeping Tom Nice
1991	Terry Johnson	Imagine Drowning
1992	Rod Wooden	Your Home in the West
1993	Martin Crimp	The Treatment
1993	Helen Edmundson	The Clearing
1994	Jonathan Harvey	Beautiful Thing
1995	Joe Penhall	Some Voices
1996	Ayub Khan-Din	East is East
1997	Ann Coburn	Get Up and Tie Your Fingers
1998/9	Roy Williams	Starstruck
1999		
2000	David Greig	The Cosmonaut's Last Message to the Woman He Once Loved in the Former Soviet Union
2000	Tanika Gupta	The Waiting Room
2001	Zinnie Harris	Further than the Furthest Thing
2002	Peter Rumney	Jumping on my Shadow
2003	Rona Munro	Iron
2004	Owen McCafferty	Scenes from the Big Picture
2005	Fin Kennedy	How to Disappear Completely and Never Be Found
2006	James Phillips	The Rubenstein Kiss
2006	Fraser Grace	Breakfast with Mugabe
2007	Dennis Kelly	Taking Care of Baby
2008	Bryony Lavery	Stockholm
2009	Alexi Kaye Campbell	The Pride
2010	Tim Crouch	The Author
2010	Lucy Kirkwood	it felt empty when the heart went at first but it is alright now
