= McQueen (play) =

2015 play by James Phillips

- Original language: English
- Written by: James Phillips
- Characters: Alexander McQueen
- Subject: Alexander McQueen
- Genre: Drama
- Setting: London

Premiere
- Date: 12 May 2015
- Place: St. James Theatre, London
- Directed by: John Caird

McQueen is a play by British playwright James Phillips and directed by John Caird. It received its world premiere at the St. James Theatre, London, in May 2015. Starring Stephen Wight and Dianna Agron, the story is set over the course of one night. It focuses on the visionary imagination of the late fashion designer Alexander McQueen, about a girl who breaks into the designer's home to steal a dress and is caught by McQueen.

Following its premiere run, the play was transferred to the West End's Theatre Royal, Haymarket from August 27 to November 7, 2015.

== Background ==
McQueen is a play by British playwright James Phillips, inspired by a statement Alexander McQueen made in 2008: "I've got a 600-year-old elm tree in my garden. I made up a story: a girl lives in it and comes out of the darkness to meet a prince and becomes a queen."

On 11 February 2015, it was confirmed that the play would receive its world premiere at the St. James Theatre, London from 12 May, with press nights on 19 and 20 June, booking for a limited period until 27 June 2015. The play marks the five year anniversary of the designer's death and had been in production since 2012.

The play is set on a single night in London and follows the character of Dahlia, a fan of McQueen who breaks into his house to steal a dress and is discovered by him. Instead of reporting the girl, McQueen embarks with her on a journey through London.

In March 2015, it was announced that Stephen Wight would play McQueen, Glee actress Dianna Agron would play Dahlia and Tracy-Ann Oberman would play the designer's muse Isabella Blow. The play is directed by John Caird, with choreography by Christopher Marney, fight direction by Kate Walters, design by David Falrey, lighting design by David Howe, video design by Tim Bird and sound by John Leonard.

Following its premiere production the play was scheduled to transfer to the West End's Theatre Royal, Haymarket where it ran from 27 August to 7 November 2015, with a press night on 27 August. For the West End run, Agron was unable to reprise her role as Dahlia due to existing commitments and Carly Bawden joined the production as her replacement. In addition Michael Bertenshaw joined the cast as Mr. Hitchcock. For the transfer, some scenes were rewritten and an interval was added.

== Principal roles and original cast ==
Character	St. James performer	West End performer
Alexander McQueen	Stephen Wight	Stephen Wight
Dahlia	Dianna Agron	Carly Bawden
Isabella Blow	Tracy-Ann Oberman	Tracy-Ann Oberman
Arabella	Laura Rees	Laura Rees
Mr. Hitchcock	David Shaw-Parker	Michael Bertenshaw
Twin	Eloise Hymas; Carrie Willis	Eloise Hymas; Carrie Willis

== Reception ==
=== Box office ===
McQueen broke the box office record at the St. James Theatre in its first night, which was previously recorded by the musical Urinetown in 2014.

=== Critical reception ===
McQueen has met with mixed reviews from critics. Kristy Wallace from 4 Your Excitement said that McQueen "should be watched by as many people as possible, and shows that James Phillips has a fantastically bright future in the theatre". She also praised Wight and Agron for their amazing jobs. Holly Williams for The Independent did not think the same way: "Dianna Agron is not good, I’m afraid. Her delivery is glib yet slow. I never believe the quick-fire rapport with McQueen, this performance is more blunt than a pair of old sewing scissors; it simply doesn't cut it." This was contradicted by Tom Millward from The London Theatre. He said that with McQueen Agron was able "to demonstrate her impressive talents as a performer". Gully Hopper from About Time Magazine thought that the play "will find sanctuary in the minds of fashion lovers, while avid theatregoers may need further convincing".
