= James Phillips (playwright) =

British playwright, director and photographer

James Phillips (born 29 April 1977) is a British playwright, director and photographer.

Educated at St Catherine's College, Oxford, Phillips' first play, The Rubenstein Kiss, won both the John Whiting Award (2006) and the TMA Award for Best Play. As a director he has worked extensively and was a recipient of the National Arts Endowment Award for his first professional production, Frank McGuinness's Observe the Sons of Ulster Marching Towards the Somme at the Pleasance, London.

== Plays ==
- The Little Fir Tree (2004) premiered at Sheffield Theatres, directed by James Phillips
- The Rubenstein Kiss (2005) premiered at the Hampstead Theatre, directed by James Phillips
- Wind in the Willows (2010) adapted for Latitude Festival, directed by Alan Lane
- Time and the City (2011) premiered in Hull for Slung Low Theatre Company, directed by Alan Lane
- Hidden in the Sand (2013) premiered at Trafalgar Studios, directed by James Phillips
- City Stories (2013-ongoing) resident at St James Theatre, London, transferred to 59E59 Theaters, New York in May 2016, directed by James Phillips
- The White Whale (2014) premiered in Leeds for Slung Low Theatre Company, directed by Alan Lane
- Camelot: The Shining City (2015) premiering at Sheffield Theatres, directed by Alan Lane
- McQueen (2015) premiering at St James Theatre, London, transferred to Theatre Royal, Haymarket, London in August 2015, directed by John Caird
- Flood (2017) premiering as part of Hull UK City of Culture 2017, directed by Alan Lane

== Other work ==
- If We Dead Awaken (2012), TV drama for Coming Up, Channel 4, directed by Luke McManus
- Nicosia: The Last Dividing Line (2013), book of documentary photography, published by En Tipis (Nicosia, Cyprus)
