= Punk: Chaos to Couture =

PUNK: Chaos to Couture
- First edition
- Author: Andrew Bolton; Richard Hell; Jon Savage; John Lydon
- Language: English
- Genre: Non-fiction
- Publication date: 2013
- Media type: Print
- Pages: 240

PUNK: Chaos to Couture is a 2013 non-fiction book by Andrew Bolton (curator of the Costume Institute's exhibition), with an introduction by Andrew Bolton, an introduction by Jon Savage, and prefaces by Richard Hell and John Lydon, the "catalog of the exhibition held at the Metropolitan Museum of Art, New York, May 9 - August 14, 2013'.

== Overview ==
An exhibition catalog with a collection of essays and photos tying together the style and fashion of punk rock, for the Metropolitan Museum of Art art exhibition.

The exhibition, which opened on the eve of the Met Gala, occurred from 9 May 2013 to 14 August 2013. According to the Metropolitan Museum of Art, it focused "on the relationship between the punk concept of "do-it-yourself" and the couture concept of "made-to-measure."
