= Khussa (footwear) =

Traditional footwear of Sindh and Punjab

Sindhi khusso, Multani khussa or simply just khussa (Urdu: کُھسّہ) is a traditional footwear from Sindh and Punjab in Pakistan. Khussas are hand-made by local artisans, mostly using vegetable-tanned leather. The top of khussas is made of one piece of leather or textile, which is embroidered and embellished with brass nails, cowry shells, taunra, mirrors, bells and ceramic beads. The bonding from the upper to the sole is also done by cotton thread that is not only eco-friendly but also enmeshes the leather fibers with great strength. Some product range also uses bright and ornate threads.

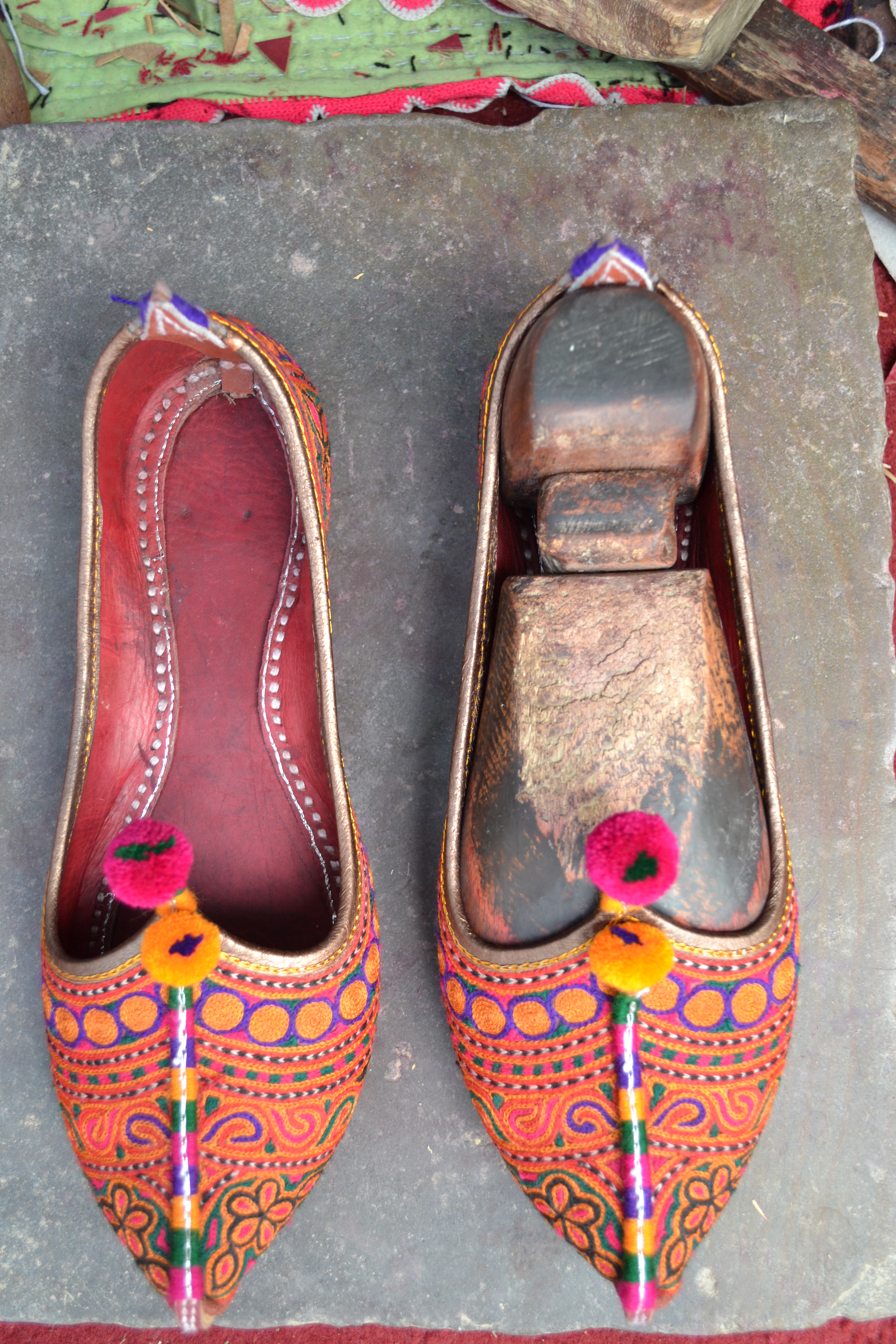
Sindhi khusso

There are different varieties of khussas for example Sindhi, Multani, Punjabi, Jacobabadi, Kandhkoti, Makeshan, Nagrro and others are most popular in Sindh and Punjab.

== Gallery ==
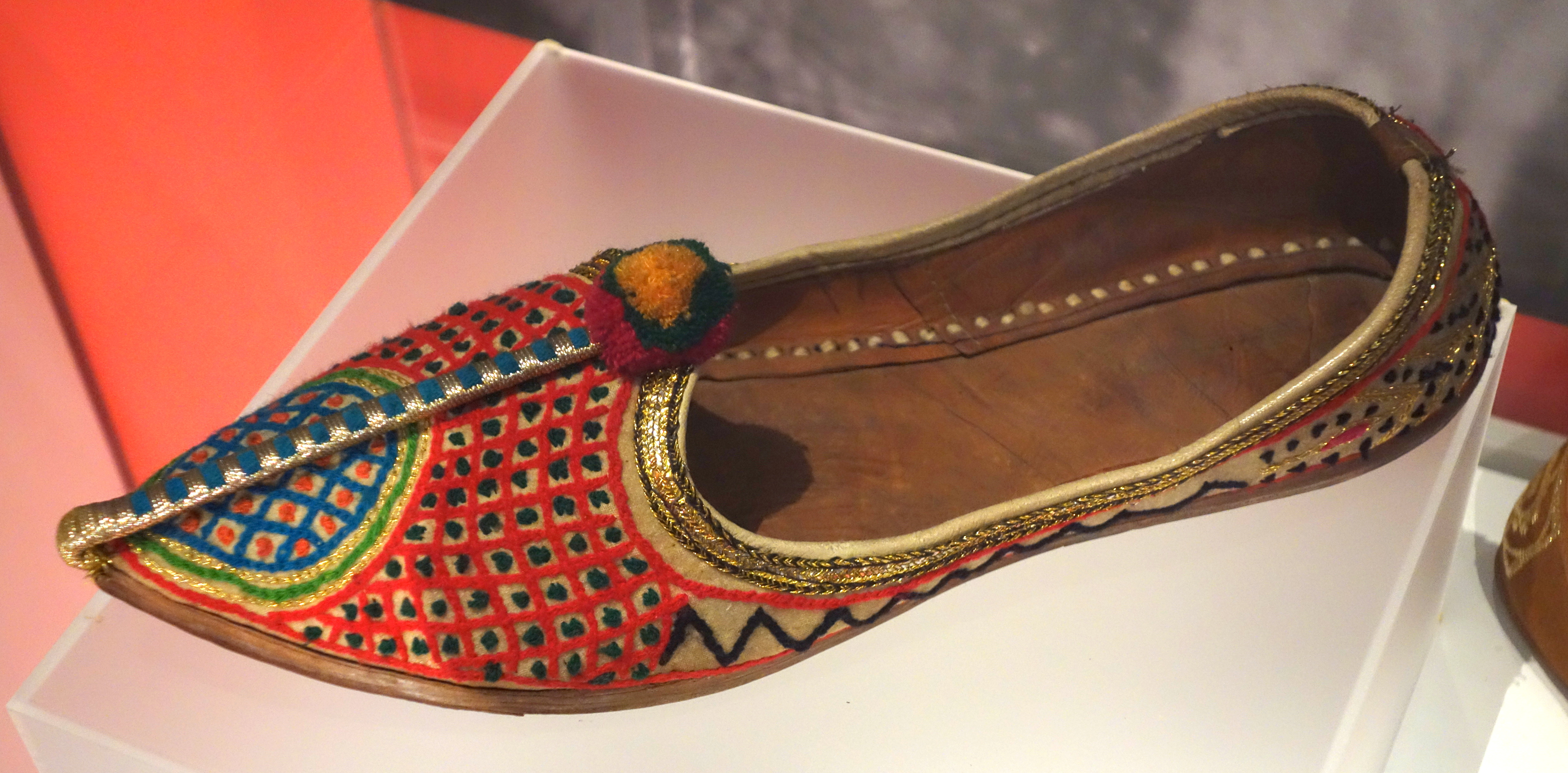

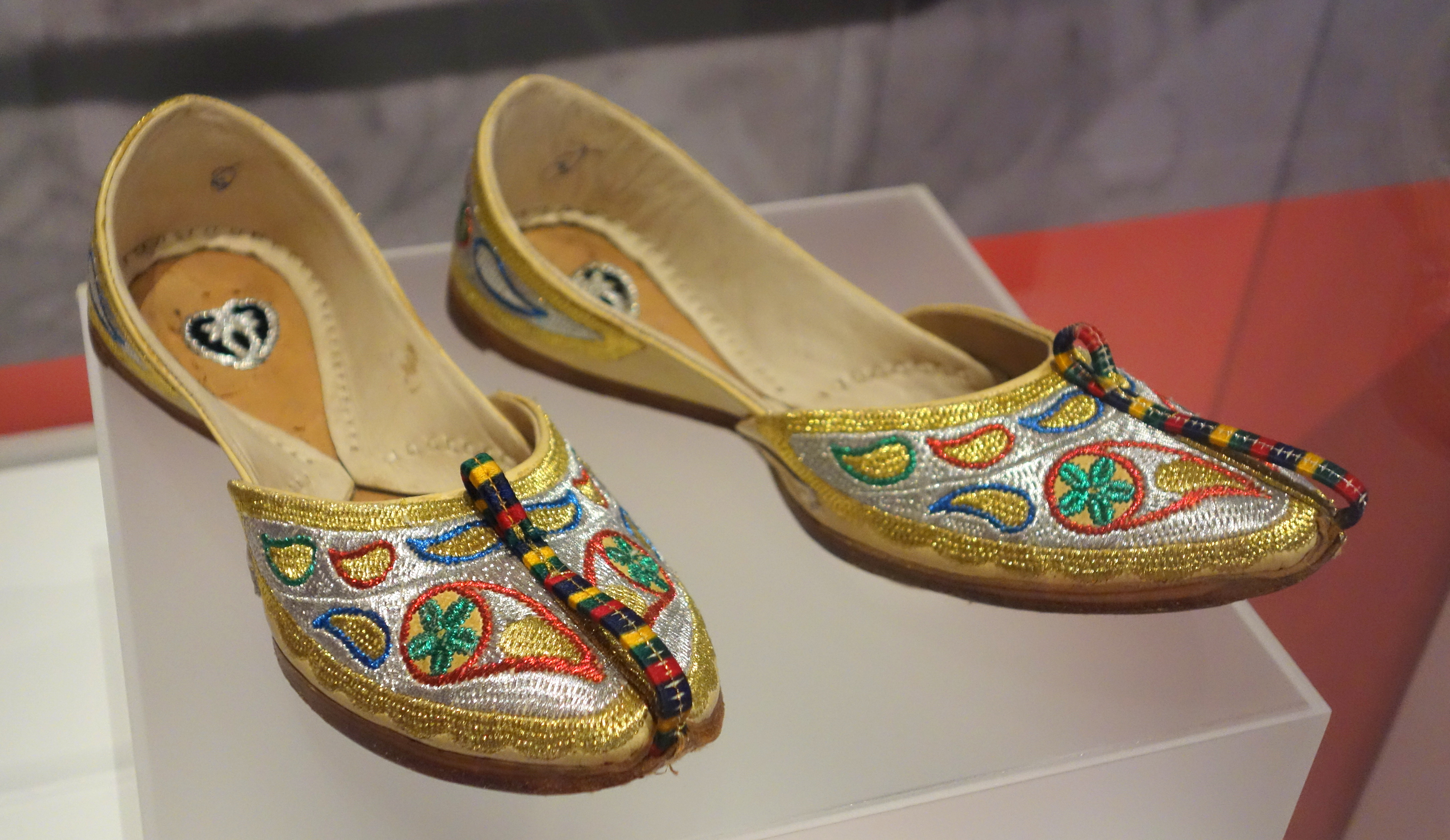

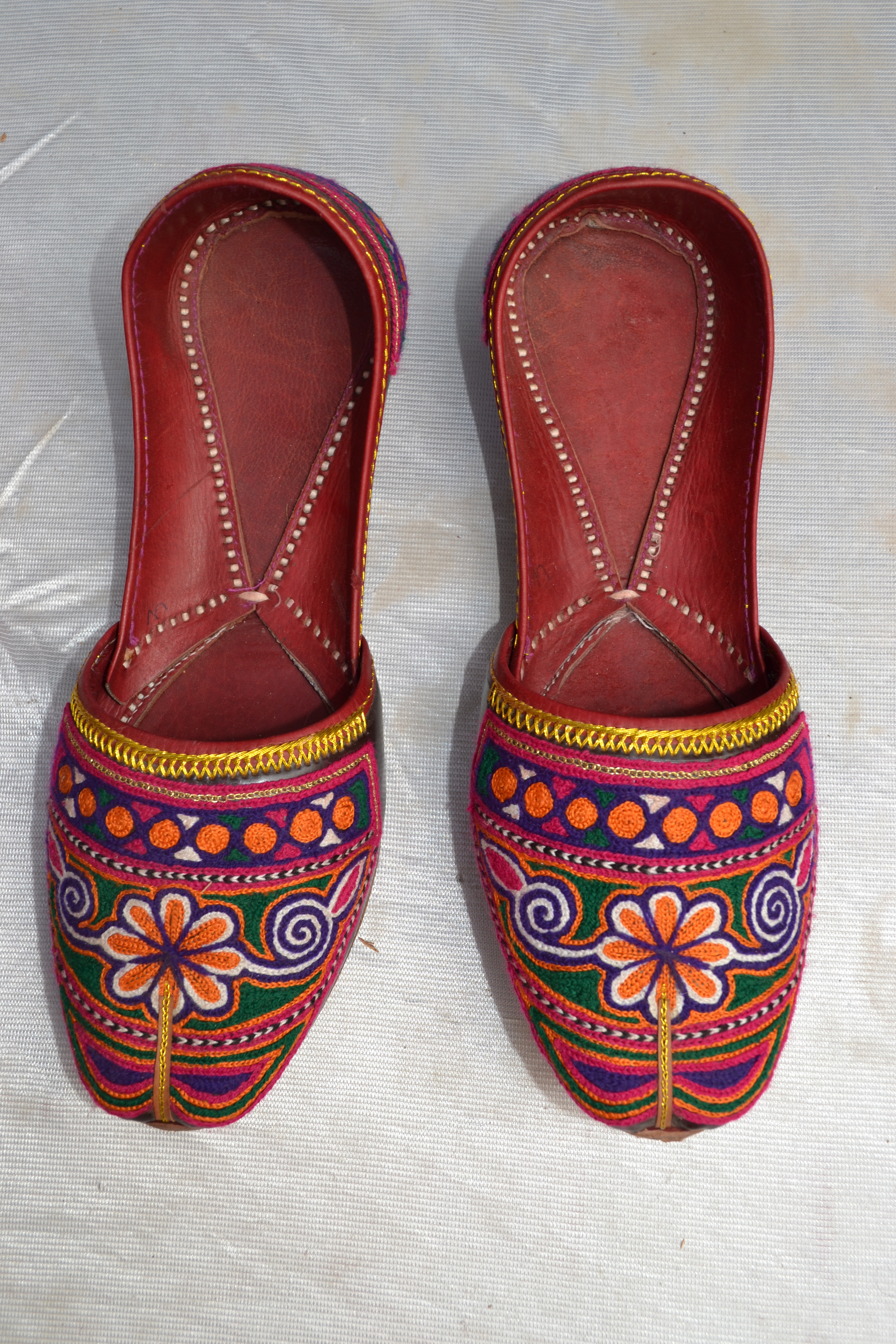
Sindhi Khusso

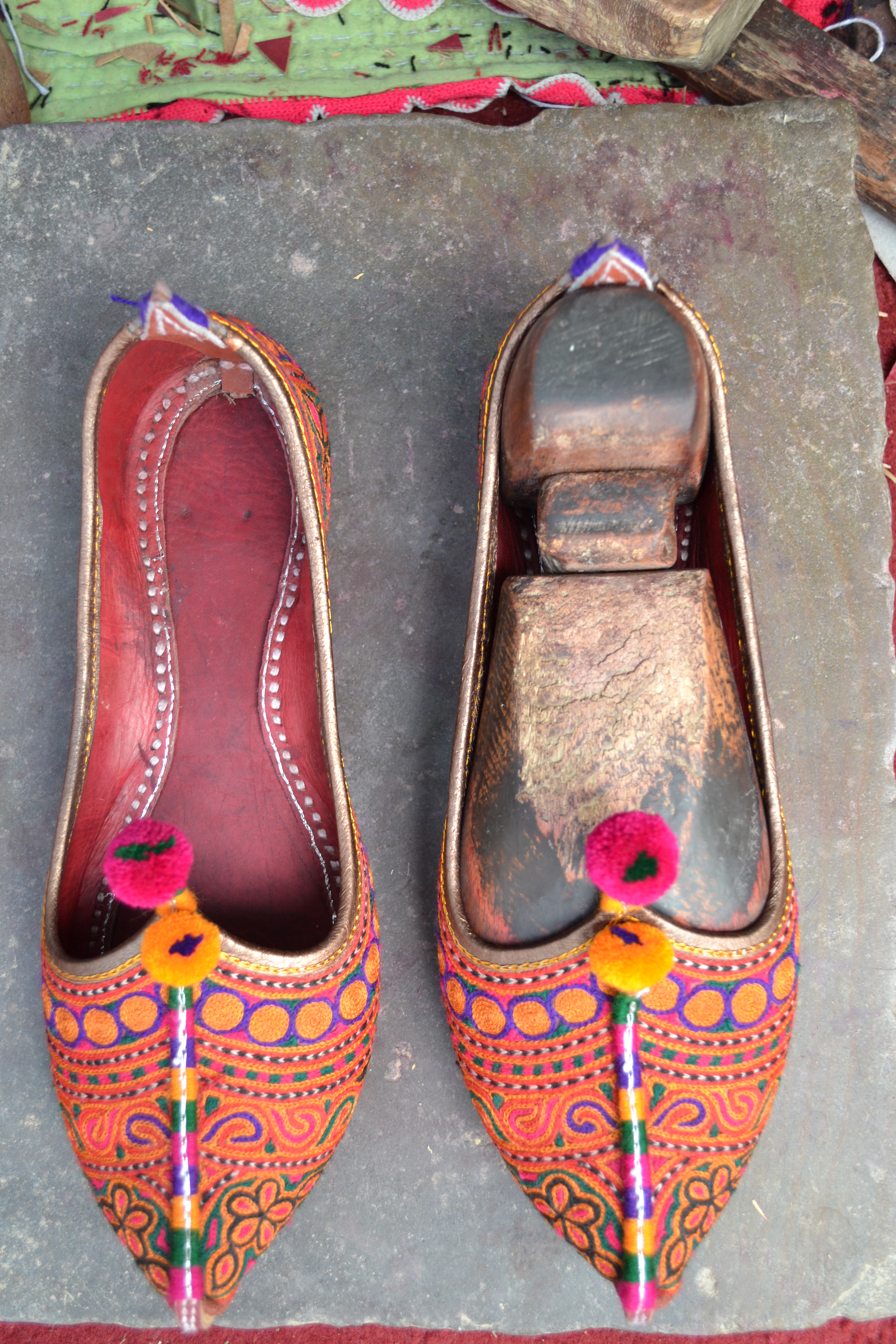
Sindhi Khusso

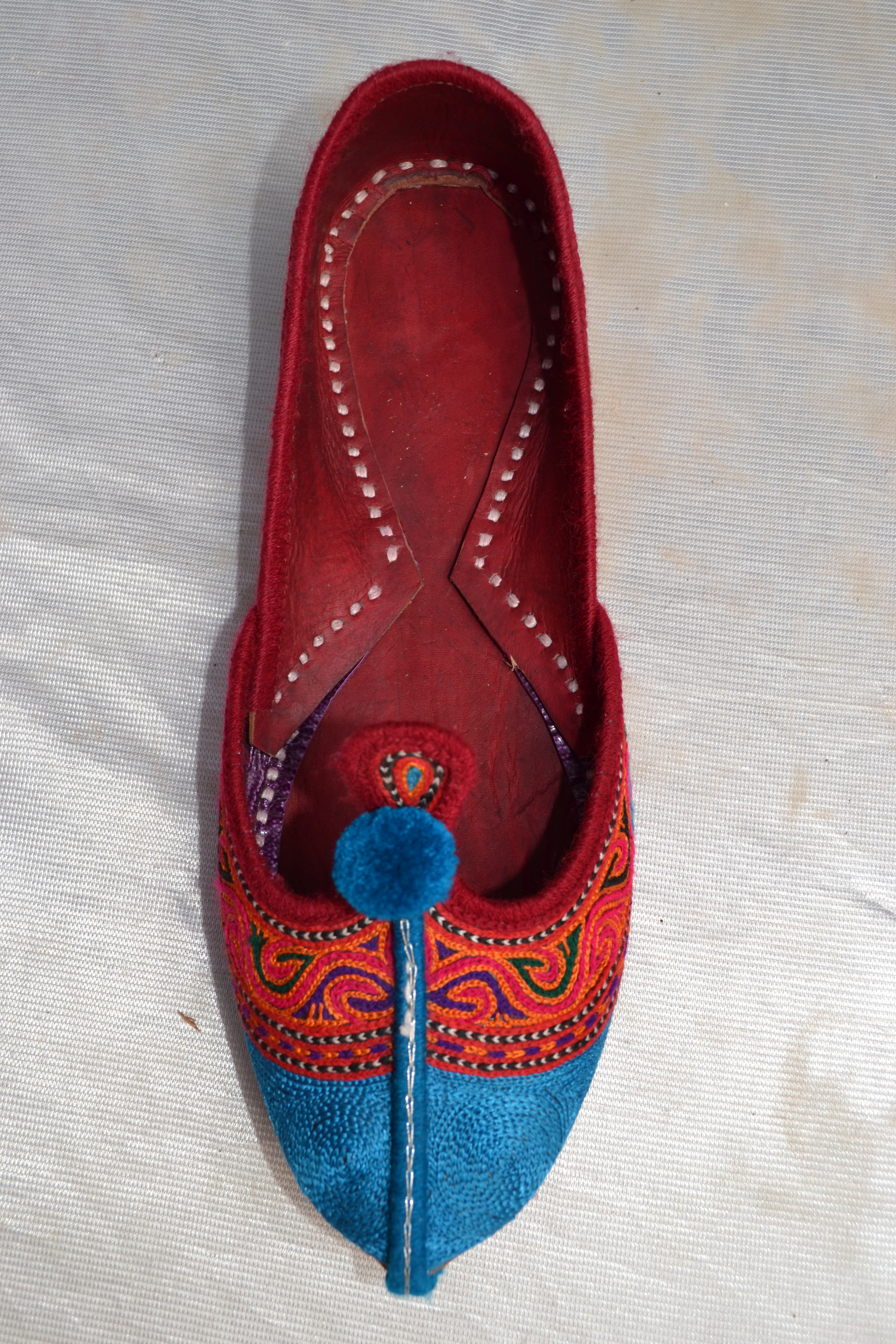

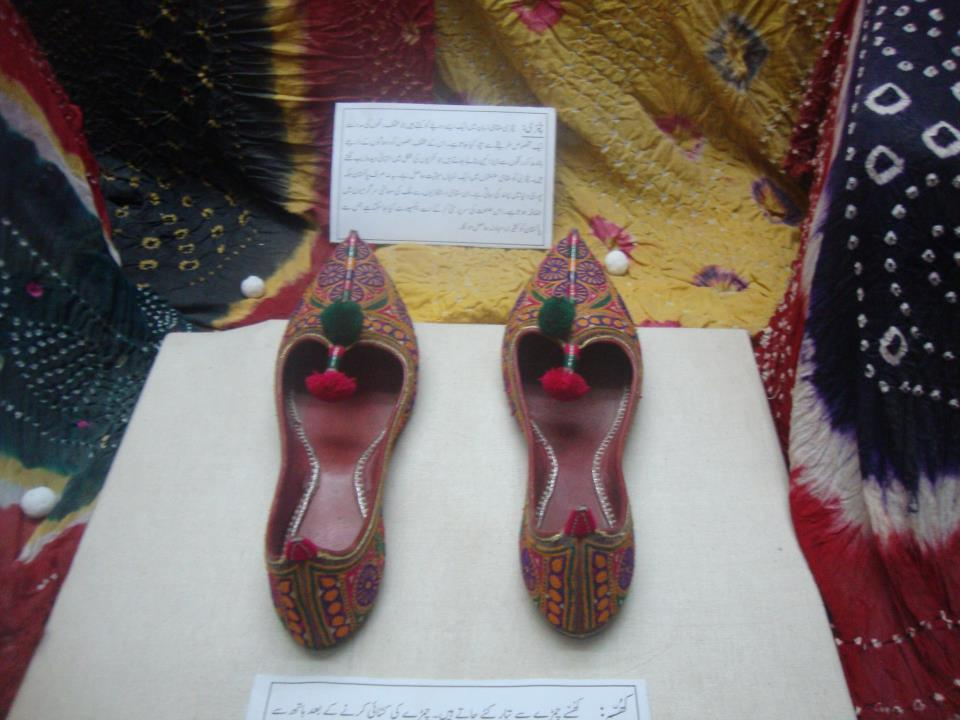

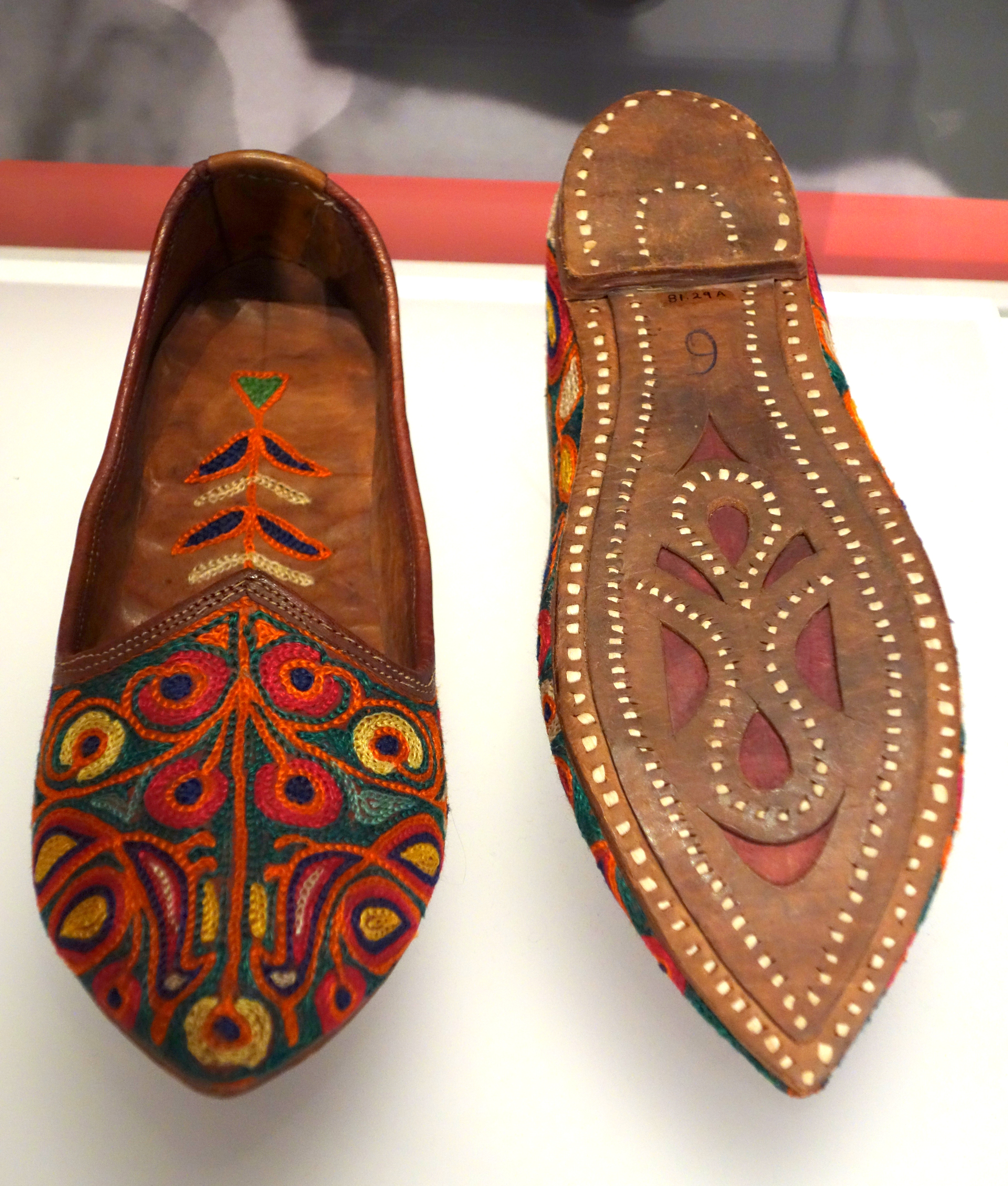

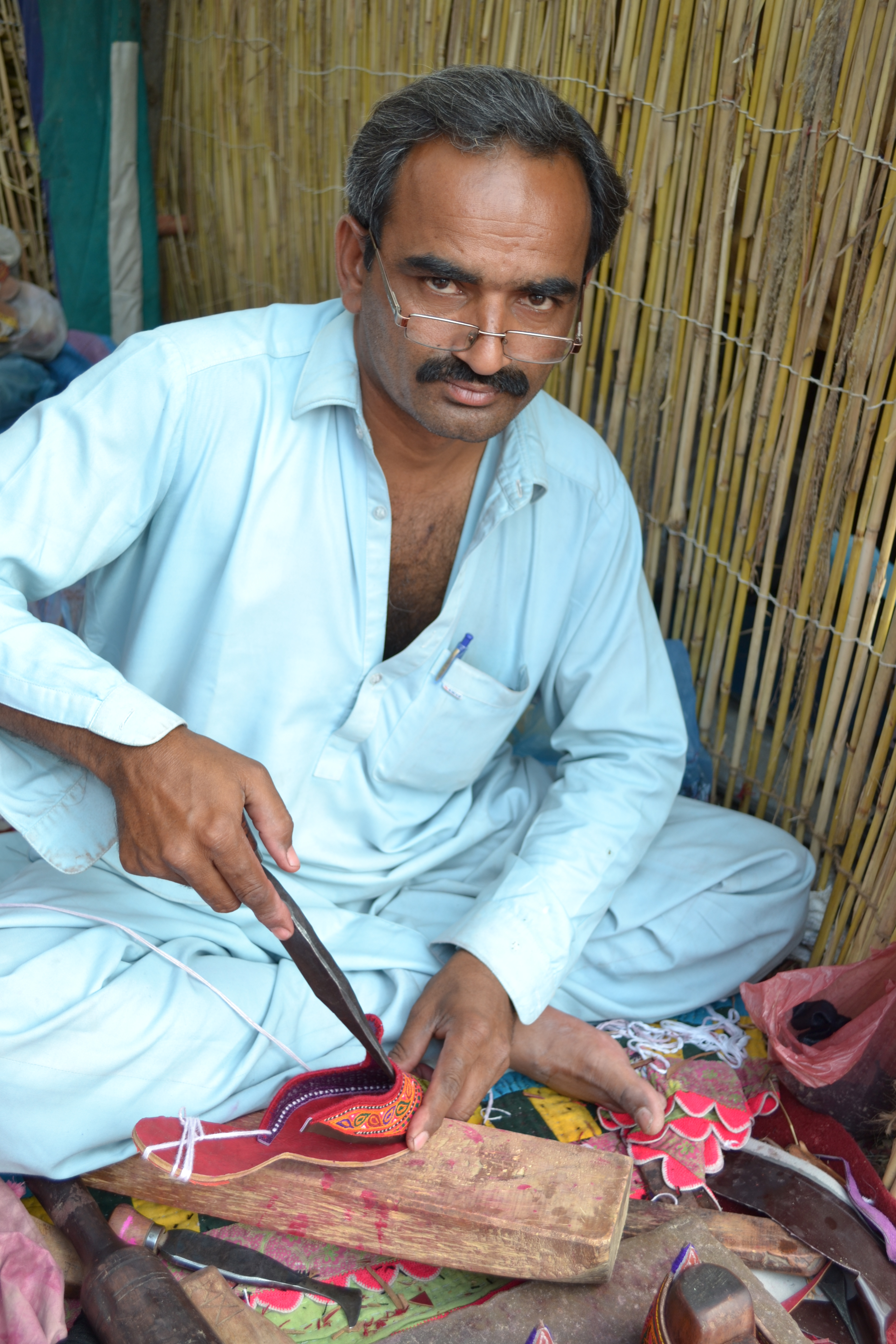
Sindhi man making Sindhi Khusso

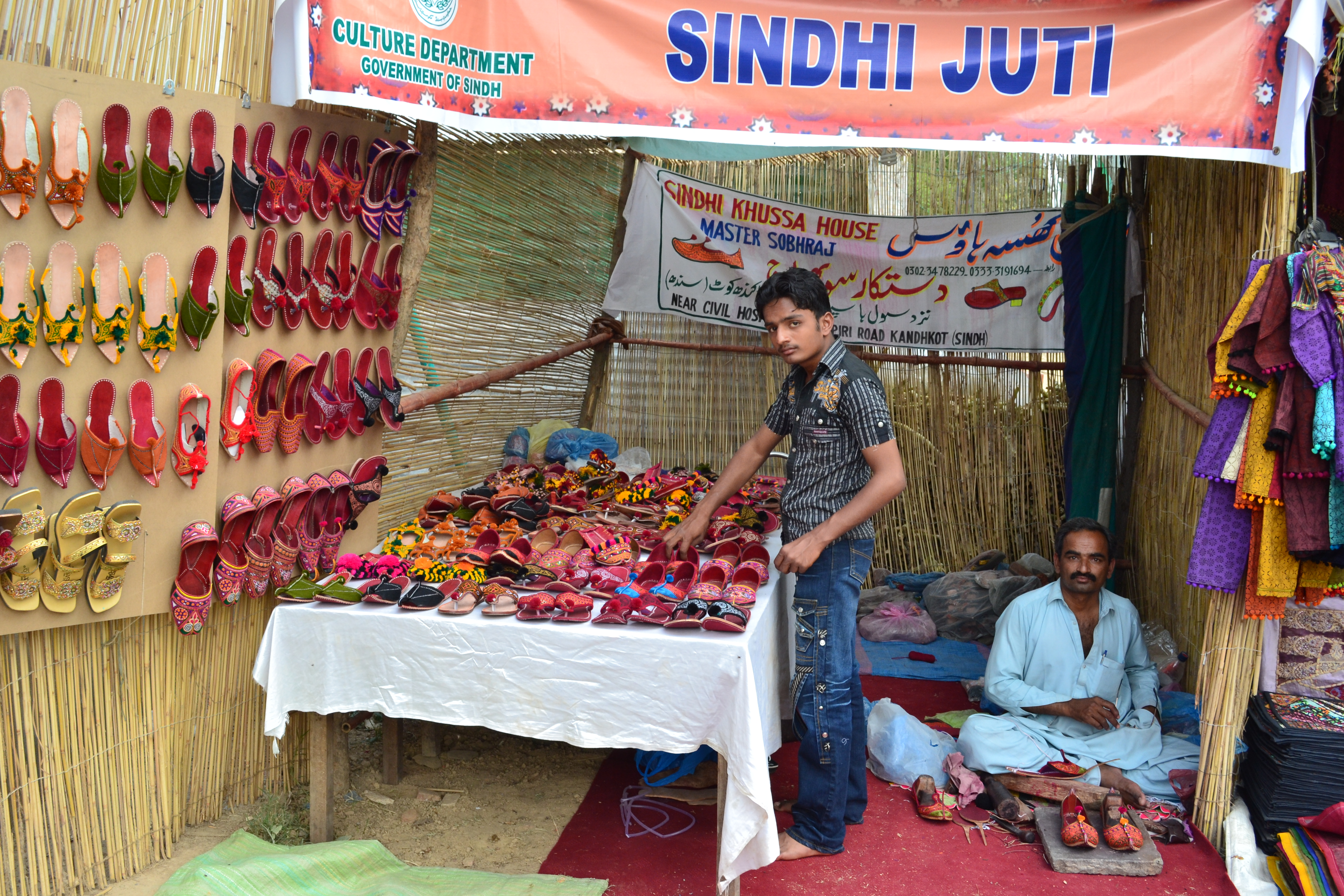
Sindhi Khussa and Jutti shop

== See also ==
- Jutti
- Mojari
- Paduka
- List of shoe styles
