= Jutti =

Traditional and ethnic South Asian footwear

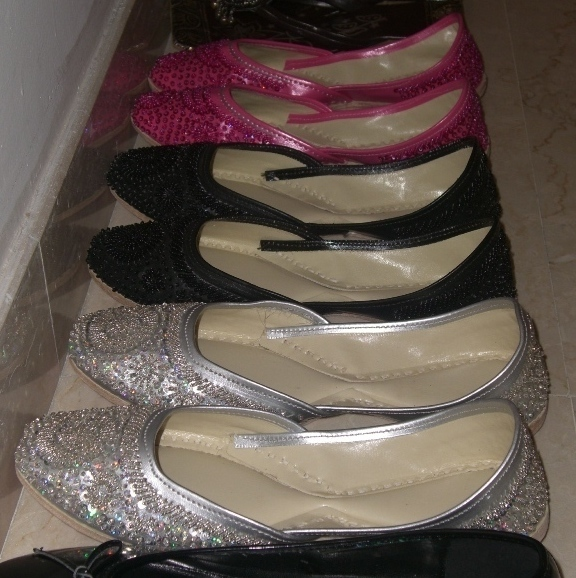
Jutti shoes

The Jutti is a type of footwear common in Punjabi region (North India and Pakistan). They are traditionally made up of leather and with extensive embroidery, in real gold and silver thread as inspired by royalty in the subcontinent over 400 years ago.

Juttis are sometimes made with rubber soles in the present day. Today Amritsar and Patiala ("tilla jutti") are important trade centers for handcrafted juttis, from where they are exported all over the world to Punjabi diaspora. Closely related to khussa, juttis have evolved into several localized design variations, even depending upon the shoemaker. However by large, they have no left or right distinction, and over time take the shape of the foot. They usually have flat sole, and are similar in design for both women and men, except for men they have a sharp extended tip, nokh curved upwards like traditional moustaches, and are also called khussa, and some women’s jutis are backless.

Even with changing times juttis have remained part of ceremonial attire, especially at North Indian weddings, the unembellished juttis are used for everyday use for both men and women in most of Punjab, mostly called "Jalsa Jutti" which is blackish in color.

Many Punjabi folk songs mention juttis, like Jutti kasuri peri na poori hai rabba sanu turna paiy and Jutti lagdi vairia mere.

== Overview ==
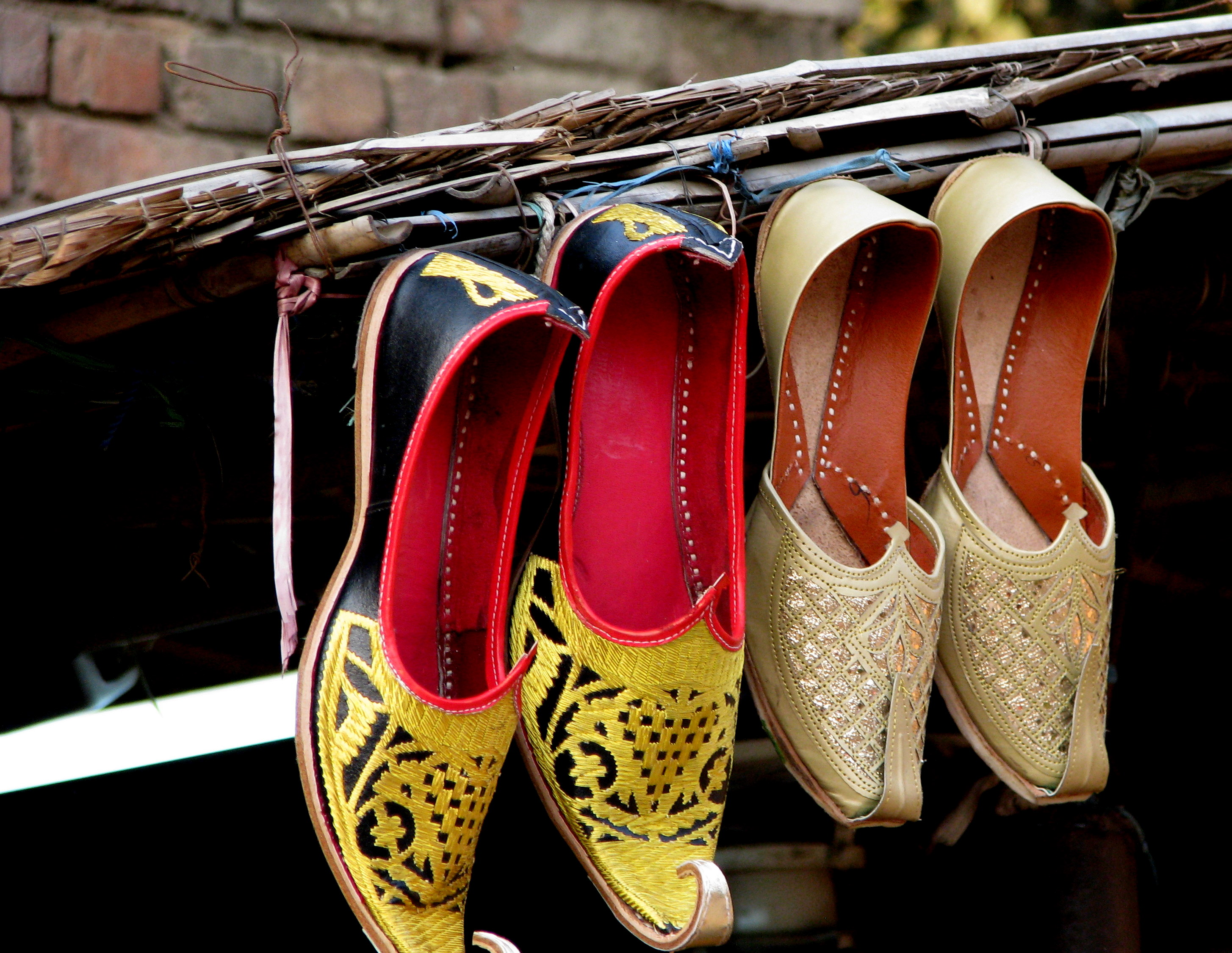
Punjabi jutti for men with extended curved tip, or nokh'.

There is a wide variety of juttis available for both men and women. During certain festivals special juttis are also fitted to the feet of cows. Elsewhere in India, juttis are commonly also known as mojari, while an alternative name in Pakistan is khussa. Like mojaris, these are long shoes with the end curled upwards. They have been traditionally handed down over generations, with each generation contributing some variation to it. These are the traditional ethnic Indian footwear.

They are usually made of fine leather and are delicately embroidered with threads or beads. Juttis are slip-on in style and are characterized by rising high to the Achilles tendon in the back and covering the toes with a round or M-shaped heavily-embroidered upper, leaving the top of the foot nearly bare. Some feature extensive hand-done embroidery.

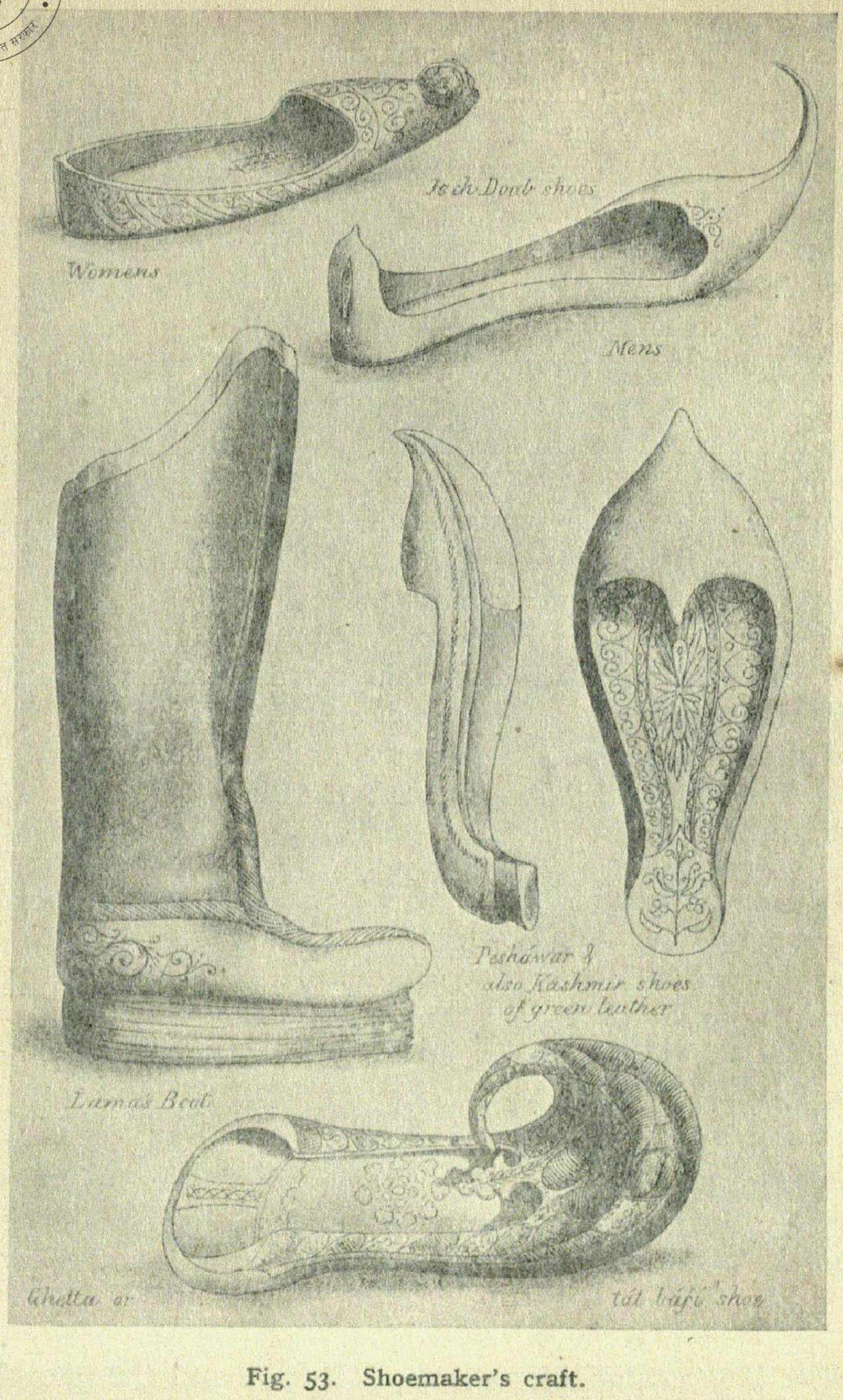
Depiction of Punjabi jutti (from Baden Powell's 'Panjáb Manufactures'), published in 'The Panjab, North-West Frontier Province and Kashmir' (1916)

It is believed that one of the earliest examples of footwear worn on the Indian subcontinent is a sandal of wood, datable to circa 200 BC. During the 3rd and 4th centuries in the Buddhist period, it was quite common to wear strapped sandals and Indian kings wore sandals ornamented with precious jewels. Jain literature shows that leather was used for the making of shoes, which protected the toes from getting injured. Hides of cows, buffaloes, goats, sheep and other wild animals were used.

== See also ==
- List of shoe styles
- Mojari - similar shoe from same region
- Turban training centre -turban academies opened everywhere in Punjab which teaches the art of modern turban tying with various styles like Morni Dastar, Patiala Shahi
- Kung fu shoe
- Ballet shoes
