= Hassan Hayat =

Pakistani actor and singer (b. 1992)

- Born: 14 October 1992 (age 33); Karachi, Sindh, Pakistan
- Occupations: Actor, Singer, Lyricist, Composer and Entrepreneur.
- Years active: 2009–present
- Spouse: Sadia Ghaffar (m. 2020)

Hassan Hayat is a Pakistani actor and singer. He is best known for his role as Imran in ARY Digital's Bhool (2019). Hassan becomes the Peace Ambassador Between Pakistan and India in 2018.

== Life and career ==
After completing his education he started his music and created 8 commercial tracks for television and sung in half of them. His first single was "Beqadraa". In 2019 he made his acting debut in the television series Bhool opposite Affan Waheed and Saboor Aly.

In 2020, Hayat married actress Sadia Ghaffar.

== Discography ==
Year	Song	Notes
2014	"Beqadraa"	
2018	"Bol Do"	
2020	"Ye Watan Tumhara Hai"	

== Filmography ==
=== Television ===
Year	Serial	Role
2019	Bhool	Imran
