= Shanakht =

Pakistani television series

- Title Screen
- Genre: Drama; Social; Romantic
- Developed by: Ahtesham Ahmad Khan
- Written by: Amna Nawaz Khan
- Directed by: Amna Nawaz Khan
- Starring: Maya Ali; Noor Hassan Rizvi; Fahad Mirza; Kanza Wayne
- Theme music composer: Mad Music
- Opening theme: "Shanakht" by Midhat
- Country of origin: Pakistan
- Original language: Urdu
- No. of episodes: 18

Production
- Executive producer: Irfan Momin
- Producer: Momina Duraid
- Production locations: Karachi, Pakistan
- Cinematography: Sajid Kashmiri
- Editors: Hussain Masoor; Imtiaz Ali
- Running time: Tuesday 8:00pm (40 Minutes of airing without commercials)
- Production company: A N K Production

Original release
- Network: Hum TV
- Release: 5 August – 16 December 2014

Related
- Izteraab; Zid

Shanakht (Urdu: شناخت, lit. 'Identity') is a Pakistani television social drama series that debuted on Hum TV on 5 August 2014. It is written and directed by Amna Nawaz Khan and produced by Momina Duraid. It is produced under the banner A N K Production. The show stars Maya Ali, Fahad Mirza and Noor Hassan Rizvi in pivotal roles. The show aired Tuesdays at 8:00 pm.

The series aired its final episode on 16 December 2014 and received acclaim. Shanakht received widespread critical acclaim. Due to the Islamic serial trend and minimum cult philosophy cliche dialogues, the serial was a major hit and received praise.

== Plot ==
Shanakht mainly deals with the subject of social life in upper-class Pakistan. The story revolves around a young girl named Qurratulain (Maya Ali) (nicknamed Annie), a devout and practising Muslim. She often covers her head using a hijab as prescribed by her faith. She usually faces strong criticism and objections from her family members over her obsession with being a dutiful Muslim, especially from her liberal-thinking mother. As time progresses, Annie develops feelings for her first cousin Hashim (Noor Hassan Rizvi). Hashim, though fond of Annie, resents what he considers her conservative and outdated outlook on life. In a twisted turn of events, Hashim sends a wedding proposal for Kashaf (Hina Javed), Annie's younger sister, rather than Annie, who has always been deemed more compatible with him. Kashaf outright rejects the proposal. With a broken heart, Hashim leaves for England for higher studies, where he befriends Rohaan (Fahad Mirza). Rohaan has a pleasant, fun-loving personality but also believes in adhering to religious teachings. Rohaan's friendship gradually changes Hashim, his attitude towards life and religion.

== Cast ==
- Maya Ali as Qurratulain (Annie)
- Noor Hassan Rizvi as Hashim
- Fahad Mirza as Rohaan
- Muneeb Butt as Haris
- Kanza Wayne as Faryal
- Shamim Hilaly as Shareen
- Azra Mohyeddin as Rohaan's mother
- Shehryar Zaidi as Rohaan's father
- Sabahat Ali Bukhari as Huma
- Hina Javed As Kashaf
- Fariya Hassan As Ayesha
- Mariam Ansari as Zubia
- Bilal Awan

== Summary ==
=== Episodes 1–6 ===
Shanakht is a story of a girl, Qurratulain, or Annie (Maya Ali), from a modern/liberal family. Things take a new turn when Annie starts covering her head with a head scarf, commonly known as a hijab. Annie faces opposition from her family over this decision, but she is firm. Like a typical young girl, Annie likes her first cousin Hashim (Noor Hassan). Hashim (Noor Hassan Rizvi) also wants her to be his life partner. He is allergic to the new ideas and way of life of Annie to the extent that he proposes to Annie's sister Kashaf instead of Annie. Kashaf rejects the proposal (as she is in love with her friend Haris). With a broken heart, Hashim leaves for England for higher studies, where he befriends Rohaan (Fahad Mirza). Rohaan is pleasant and fun-loving but also believes in adhering to religious teachings. Rohaan's parents are friends with Hashim and Annie's parents, Hashim and Rohaan are unaware of this. Because of the marriage refusal, there is a rift between Hashim and Kashaf's family. Annie overcomes these differences and makes everyone live happily together. Rohaan's family has fixed his marriage date with a girl named Esha, but they are unaware of his new look. When Rohaan comes back to Pakistan, everyone is shocked to see him.

Annie's mother is fed up with her hijab and wants her to remove it immediately. She is angry at Annie that no one is marrying Annie because of her new look and wants her sister Kashaf for the marriage, who is again refusing. Her mother blames her friend Ayesha (also Islamic) for her hijab and forces her to stay away from Ayesha. She is also forcing her to stop wearing a hijab which disturbs Annie. A new proposal comes, and to appear in front of them, Huma(Ainny's mother) tells her not to wear a hijab. She says that Annie can do what she wants after the marriage but should listen to her for now. Annie does so. The proposal is accepted, leaving Annie sad and crying that she has disturbed her identity.

=== Episode 7-8(Climax) ===
Annie is unhappy with her fiancée's disturbing personality and dislikes that he wants her to go out with him. Annie tells Kashaf about this. She says that going out to dinner with him will grow their understanding. Annie agrees. The next day Annie goes to a restaurant with her fiancée, where he invites his friend. The episode focuses on the fact that he has a bad character. Realising this, Annie leaves. He holds her hand to stop her and tells her to stay and listen to him. Annie slaps him and shows him his limit. She ends her engagement. When Annie reaches home, Annie tells everyone her decision is right. After this, she tells Huma that there is a charming man whom Annie is waiting for and that he would soon entire her life upon Allah's choice. Huma smiles and agrees. The next morning Annie asks her father Ajmat if she wants to join her office, and through this, she can prove that Hijaab is not a painful thing for women. Ajmat smiles and agrees. Kashaf tells everyone about Haris and gets engaged to him, making Ajmat and Huma happy for both their daughters.

The next day in the office, Annie is working and meets Rohaan. Rohaan gets so impressed with her personality that he asks his parents to take a marriage proposal. His mother and sisters are not happy with this decision. The other day, Annie and Rohaan's engagement takes place. They decided that their marriage would take place in a mosque. This decision disturbs Huma, Kashaf, Rohaan's mother and his sisters Bina and Zubia.

The next episode starts with Rohaan, his father and Amjat. They are making arrangements for the marriage. Rohan and Annie's Nikkah takes place, and after the wedding, everyone except their fathers is shown angry with the wedding. After her wedding, when Annie goes to her room, her mother-in-law tells her that she always hated her and this marriage was only due to Rohaan's decision and that now she has to live according to her. Annie is hurt.

The next day she tells Annie to take off her hijab to go to dinner, or she should stay home for this. Annie refuses to go. Haris demands Kashaf for many things, which is disturbing Amjat.

=== Episode 9-13 ===
Bina and Zubia (Rohaan's Sisters) are unhappy with the marriage. Zubia gets engaged to Hammad. She starts to dance at a party, and her video gets leaked on the internet. She is upset and scared. Annie asks her to share her problem, and while telling her, Annie takes them both to her friend Ayesha's Home. Ayesha's brother helps them pull off the video from the internet. Zubia and Bina get impressed with Annie's personality and start to like her. Their mother, however, is not accepting of Annie. Kashaf and Haris are married, and Annie and Rohaan invite them to dinner in a restaurant. Rohaan and Haris have a little argument which further changes it into an emotional fight. Rohaan tells his parents that he has to attend a convention for his course and asks Annie to work for his office. Upon meeting Hashim, he tells him that he is married. Because of Annie's work, everyone in the office is impressed, including her father-in-law. Bina dons a hijab, but her mother yells at her and tells her to stop it. Rohaan and Hashim land in Pakistan together, and Annie finds out they are friends. Hashim has married a girl named Faryal. His mother is shocked to learn this, but she accepts them home. Haris asks Kashaf to get him a fla. She denies it, and he slaps her for this. He kicks her out, and she leaves instantly. She later regrets that she would have done what Annie did. A marriage proposal comes for Zubia, and she gets nervous. Annie handles her and calms her down. She feels relieved and hugs her. Rohaan's mother is watching this and gets impressed with Annie. Shereen(Hashim's mother) is unhappy with Faryal's habits and asks Hashim why he chose her over Annie. Haris' dad tells him that his company has faced a loss because of him, and only Rohaan can handle this. Haris talks to Rohaan, and Rohaan agrees to help. Haris is now shocked by his personality. Rohaan's mother finally accepts Annie as her daughter-in-law and Zubia's marriage takes place.

=== Episode 14-16 ===
Annie is happy as a wife, daughter-in-law, and worker. Due to her sweet nature, everyone loves her now. Hashim is tired of the fighting between Faryal and his mother (Sheeren). He is working with Rohaan and Annie in their office. Haris accepts his mistake and asks Kashaf to forgive him. Kashaf then asks Annie and thanks her for being supportive.

These episode sequences show that Hashim regrets rejecting Annie's proposal and wants Faryal to be a good daughter-in-law. He feels guilty for his bad deeds and for refusing Annie because of her hijab.

=== Episode 17 ===
Hashim and his mother tell Faryal to live decently and stop her indecent acts, but she tells them she is what she always will be. It furthermore creates distances between Shereen and Faryal.

The next day Faryal angrily goes to Rohaan's office and tells Hashim to leave. Rohaan is not present there, and Annie tells Faryal to have coffee and tells her to wait. Faryal yells and tells her to be quiet. Hashim gets angry at Faryal and tells her to shut up. Faryal then asks Hashim why he rejected Annie if he likes Annie more than her(Faryal). Annie gets hurt and cries, remembering her past. She takes leave from the office and spends her time in depression, whereas, Hashim tells Faryal to apologize to Annie or else he would leave her. And Faryal also starts wearing the clothes that her mother-in-law selects for her.

=== Episode 18 (Last episode) ===
The episode starts with showing Annie, who is still depressed. Hashim and Faryal are now getting divorced. When Annie hears this news, she tries her best to help them. Rohaan learns about Annie and Hashim's unstated relationship and tells her he trusts her. Rohaan asks her to stop them. The next morning, she goes there and tells Hashim she is the luckiest girl who didn't marry him. She says that if he wants Faryal to change, he must change himself. Faryal listens to them silently, and she gets to know the truth. The last scene shows Faryal apologizing to Annie. Kashaf and Haris also settle. The story ends happily, showing Annie pregnant.

== Reception ==
=== Audience reception ===
The series started with higher ratings compared to other shows. Within its first five episodes, it scored higher TRPs. When it reached episode 8, i.e. when the protagonists got married, the series scored a hit in TRPs and reached more than 6.3 TRPs on average. Upon reaching more episodes, the series eventually grew in TRP ratings and got the highest achievement on Hum TV. It received a huge number of viewers and was among the top 10 series in Pakistan. According to the leading supplier of online BARB ratings reports, ‘Shanakht,’ broadcast at 20:00, garnered 116,800 viewers peaking at 172,200 viewers in the UK, Asia and Pakistan.

=== Critical reception ===
Zainab Waseem noted that the drama reinforced what she described as inaccurate stereotypes about the Pakistani elite as being liberal and unreligious. In an year-ender article by Dawn, Salima Feerasta noted the "somewhat preachy" message of the series, and further opined that, "the serial’s unusual storyline made it stand out".

== Inspiration ==
The drama is inspired by Haya from the most famous novel "Jannat Kay Pattay" written by Nemrah Ahmed.

== Soundtrack ==
Shanakht

Soundtrack album by Midhat
- Genre: Theme song
- Length: 2:10
- Language: Urdu
- Producer: Momina Duraid

Shanakht'si title song is sung by Midhat, composed by Shani Haider the OST was released after the pilot episode and was appreciated.

Track list
No.	Title	Singer(s)	Length
1.	"Yeh jo Ajj Maire Shanakht Hai"	Midhat	2:10

== Accolades ==
Nominated work year	Date of ceremony	Award	Category	Recipient(s)	Result
2015	9 April 2015	3rd Hum Awards	Best Drama Serial Popular	Amna Nawaz Khan	Nominated
