= Saheefa Jabbar Khattak =

Pakistani actress and model

- Born: 1 October 1988 (age 38); Khanewal, Punjab, Pakistan
- Education: Beaconhouse National University
- Occupations: Actress, model
- Years active: 2017 – present
- Spouse: Khawaja Khizer (m. 2018)

Saheefa Jabbar Khattak (Urdu: صحیفہ جبار خٹک; born 1 October 1988) is a Pakistani model turned actress. After receiving an award for Best Emerging Model at Lux Style Awards and Hum Awards, Khattak ventured into acting by playing the leading lady in the 2018 television serials Teri Meri Kahani and Beti, both of which earned her critical acclaim.

== Personal life ==
Khattak was born into a Pashtun family in Khanewal, Punjab. Khattak grew up in Lahore with her parents and a younger brother. She holds BS in Business Economics from Beaconhouse National University Lahore. In December 2017, she married Khawaja Khizer Hussain. According to Khattak, she met him during her university days. They married in an Islamic wedding ceremony, at Lahore, Pakistan.

== Career ==
Khattak started her career as a fashion model and appeared in several television commercials. She is noted for her short hair looks on the ramp. After receiving an award for Best Emerging Talent at Lux Style Awards and Hum Awards, she move on to acting and made her debut with Momina Duraid's Teri Meri Kahani, where she played a lead character of Deena opposite Azfar Rehman and Saboor Aly. The serial ran for 36 Episodes on Hum TV. It was followed by another lead role in ARY Digital's social drama Beti. An Idream Entertainment's production, Beti was a critical and commercially hit. Her role as Mariam was praised by critics. She then portrayed a young to old woman who faces hardships of her single mistake in melodrama Bhool.

In 2024, she returned to television after four years in Green Entertainment's Ramadan special Rafta Rafta as a feisty and haughty landlady.

== Television ==
Key
†	Denotes serial that has not yet been released

Year	Title	Role	Notes
2018	Teri Meri Kahani	Deena	
2018–2019	Beti	Mariyam	
2019	Bhool	Aiman	
2019	Choti Choti Batain	Hania	Story "Wajah Tum Ho"
2020	Log Kya Kahenge	Meerab	
2024	Rafta Rafta	Savera	

== Awards and nominations ==
Year	Award	Category	Result
2018	Lux Style Awards	Best Emerging Talent	Won
2018	Hum Style Awards	Best Rising Star	Won
