= Sarwat Gilani =

Pakistani actress and model

- ثروت گیلانی
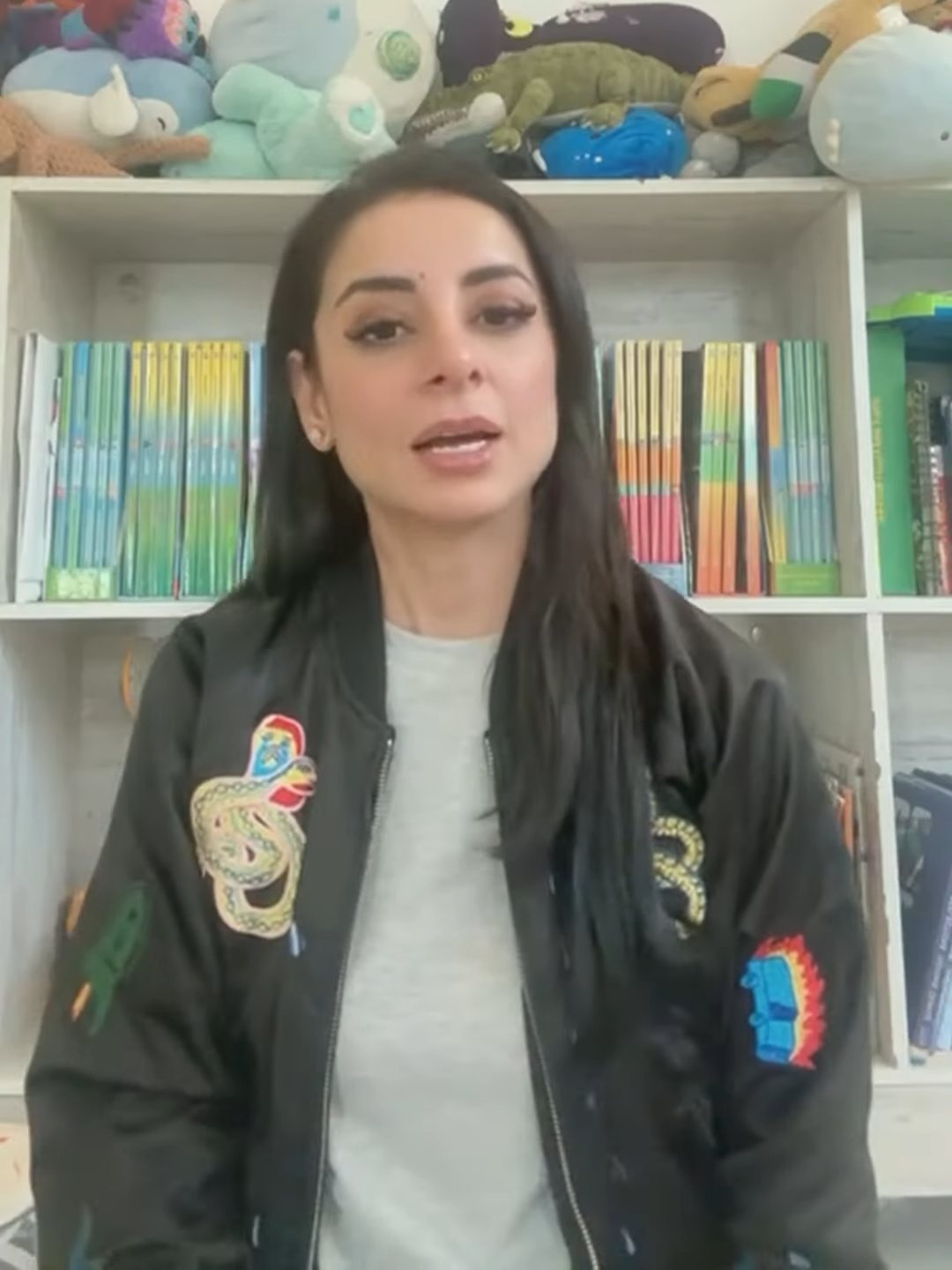
- Gilani in 2025
- Born: Sarwat Gilani; 22 December 1982 (age 43); Peshawar, KPK, Pakistan
- Occupation: Actress
- Years active: 2008–present
- Spouse: Fahad Mirza (m. 2014)
- Children: 3
- Relatives: Parveen Babi (great-aunt); Ghulam Moinuddin Khanji (grandfather); Aslam Khan (uncle)

Sarwat Gilani (Urdu: ثروت گیلانی; born 22 December 1982) is a Pakistani model, and film, television and voice actress.

== Early life ==
Sarwat Gilani was born on 22 December 1982. Sarwat belongs to a Syed Gilani family through her father while her maternal grandfather Ghulam Moinuddin Khanji was Nawab of Manavadar and had a Babai Pashtun ancestry.

== Film career ==
Gilani made her movie debut in Jawani Phir Nahi Aani where she played a pregnant Pashtun woman opposite Vasay Chaudhary. She made her stage directorial debut with Kiski Topi Kiskay Sar. She also starred in Jawani Phir Nahi Ani 2, where she reprised her role as Gul opposite Vasay Chaudhry.

== Personal life ==
She married a cosmetology surgeon and actor Fahad Mirza in August 2014. Gilani gave birth to a son, Rohan Mirza, in 2015. In June 2017, she became the mother of another son, Araiz Muhammad Mirza. She is the great-niece of Parveen Babi, who was a popular model and Bollywood actress in the 1970s, 1980s and early 1990s.

== Filmography ==
=== Film ===
Year	Title	Role	Notes	Ref(s)
2014	Baat Cheet	Anjum	Short film	
2015	Jawani Phir Nahi Ani	Gul	Nominated—Lux Style Awards for Best Supporting Actress	
2016	3 Bahadur: The Revenge of Baba Balaam	Voice of Saadi's mother		
2018	Jawani Phir Nahi Ani 2	Gul		
2018	3 Bahadur: Rise of the Warriors	Kulsoom; Saadi's mother	Voice Role	
2022	Joyland	Nucchi		
2025	Neelofar			

=== Television ===
Year	Title	Role	Network	Notes	Ref(s)
2005	Dil Ki Madham Boliyan				
2005	Hotel				
2005	Kaisi Ha				
2006	Sila				
2006	Tere Jaane Ke Baad				
2006	Kuch Dil Ne Kaha				
2009	Malaal	Mahi			
2009	Azar Ki Ayegi Baraat	Sila Ahmed			
2009	Ishq Ki Inteha	Bakhtawa			
2009	Meri Zaat Zarra-e-Benishan	Sara			
2009	Saiqa	Naaji			
2009	Kaisi Hain Doorian				
2010	Ishq Gumshuda	Alizeh			
2010	Yariyan				
2012	Mata-e-Jaan Hai Tu	Haniya Ibad Uzair			
2012	Meray Dard Ko Jo Zuban Miley	Aminah			
2012	Tishnagi				
2013	Dil E Muztar	Zoya		Nominated—Hum Award for Best Negative Character	
2014	Koi Nahi Apna	Alveera			
2014	Aahista Aahista	Sila Ahmad			
2016	Seeta Bagri	Seeta			
2017	Zaakham	Tehreem			
2017	Mann Pyasa	Naveen			
2017	Pujaran	Madiha			
2017	Yeh Ishq Hai	Samaira		Episode "Do Dilon Ke Darmyan"	
2018	Naulakha	Tehreem	TVOne Pakistan		
2018	Khasara	Linta	ARY Digital		
2025	Biryani	Gul Mehar	ARY Digital		

=== Telefilms ===
Year	Title	Role	Ref(s)
2010	Shadi Aur Tum Say?	Laila	
2013	Dil Mera Dhadkan Teri	Saira	
2013	Ek Tha Raja Ek Thi Rani		

=== Web series ===
Year	Title	Role	Notes
2020	Churails	Sara Khan	Web Series on ZEE5
2021	Qatil Haseenaon Ke Naam	Mehek	Web Series on ZEE5

== Awards and nominations ==
Year	Award	Category	Result	Work	Ref.
2016	Lux Style Awards	Best Supporting Actress	Nominated	Jawani Phir Nahi Aani	
