= Bilqees Urf Bitto =

- Title screen
- Genre: Drama
- Written by: Sameena Ejaz
- Directed by: Syed Ahsan Ali Zaidi
- Starring: Hira Salman; Fahad Mirza
- Composer: Heer Waris Shah
- Country of origin: Pakistan
- Original language: Urdu
- No. of episodes: 21

Production
- Production locations: Rahim Yar Khan, Punjab
- Cinematography: Ahmed Ali
- Running time: 35-40 minutes

Original release
- Network: Urdu 1
- Release: 1 April – 28 August 2017

Bilqees Urf Bitto is a Pakistani drama television serial first aired on 1 April 2017 on Urdu 1. It starred Hira Salman and Fahad Mirza in leading roles. The serial consists of 21 episodes. It aired its last episode on 28 August 2017 and was replaced by Mujhay Jeenay Do.

== Plot ==
The serial is a tragic love story of Bitto and Sarmad, in which Bitto is a typical village girl who has always been crushing over her village's Saaein (lord), Babar, since childhood. Bitto is a young girl who always tries to catch the eye of Babar. However, when she actually does, she accidentally drops a tray of mathai (sweets) onto his shoes, inducing Babar to insult her badly. Later, Bitto is having a mud fight with her friend, but accidentally throws mud onto Babar, who was passing by. Angrily, he labels her an illiterate "jahil" that makes Bitto aggressive and disturbed. She decides to get over with this label and leaves her small village, going to her friend's home in some urban locality/city. She somehow makes her family agree to let her go and earn in city.

She goes to her friend's home and there she meets Sarmad, a mutual between her and her friend. Eventually, she gets close to Sarmad, teaching her how to dress and act more sophisticatedly. Slowly falling in love - Bitto promises Sarmad that she will return to him after a visit to her village.

Upon returning to the village, Babar notices Bitto now that she exudes sophistication and class. He offers to marry her - an offer she cannot pass up, as she has had a crush on him since she was young. Now married, Sarmad is left wondering why Bitto is avoiding him.

Eventually, Sarmad visits her village, as he had begun to miss her. However, he is shocked to find that she is now married to someone else.

== Cast ==
=== Main ===
- Hira Salman as Bilqees alias Bittu
- Fahad Mirza as Sarmad

=== Recurring ===
- Sadia Ghaffar
- Noman Masood
- Farah Nadeem as Babar's mother
- Nida Mumtaz as Bittio's mother
- Tanveer Jamal
- Mehwish Qureshi
- Saima Chandio
- Fahad Rehmani
