= Midhat =

- Gender: Male

Origin
- Origin: Arabic
- Region of origin: Arab world

Midhat (also spelled Medhat, Mitat, Midhad, or Mithat) (Arabic: مدحت, romanized: Midḥat) is a name of Arabic origin, usually masculine, except in Pakistan. It means "praise" or "eulogy". Notable people with the name include:

== Given name ==
- Midhat Ajanović (born 1959), Bosnian-Swedish film theorist
- Midhat Frashëri (1880–1949), Albanian diplomat, writer and politician
- Midhat J. Gazalé (1929–2009), Egyptian international telecommunications and space consultant
- Midhat Gluhačević (1965–2005), Bosnian footballer
- Midhath Hilmy, Maldivian politician
- Midhat Mursi (1953–2008), Egyptian chemist
- Midhat Pasha (1822–1884), Ottoman grand vizier
- Midhat Sarajčić (born 1971), Bosnian footballer
- Mikdad Midhat Bedir Khan (1858–1915), Kurdish nationalist and journalist

== Surname ==
- Dalal Midhat-Talakić (born 1981), Bosnian female singer
