= Bhool (2019 TV series) =

Pakistani television serial drama

- Genre: Serial drama
- Written by: Ali Moin
- Directed by: Mohsin Mirza
- Starring: Saheefa Jabbar; Affan Waheed; Saboor Ali
- Country of origin: Pakistan
- Original language: Urdu
- No. of episodes: 32

Production
- Producer: Abdullah Seja
- Camera setup: Multi-camera setup
- Production company: Idream Entertainment

Original release
- Network: ARY Digital
- Release: 12 June – 16 October 2019

Bhool (Urdu: بھول, lit. 'Mistake') previously titled Daag is a 2019 Pakistani television series created by Abdullah Seja under their production house Idream Entertainment. It stars Saheefa Jabbar Khattak, Affan Waheed and Saboor Ali. Two episodes of the show are aired every Wednesday on ARY Digital. It ended on 16 October 2019, having completed 32 episodes.

== Plot ==
The drama revolves around the harsh reality of a society that neither forgives nor forgets mistakes made by women. The story of the drama 'Bhool' is all about the protagonist Aiman's mistake and its harsh consequences for her. Aiman falls in love with Awais while studying in college. But her parents engage her with someone else. The situation gets dramatic when on the day of her wedding, Aiman reveals her love but her mother refuses to accept it. In desperation, she flees from home and secretly marries Awais who then keeps the poor girl in a hotel since he is afraid to introduce her to his family. When doing so, Awais's mother refuses to accept the newlywed bride and demands Awais to divorce her. This situation puts Awais in restlessness who too is not happy about the recent developments. Awais obeys his mother and kicks Aiman out from the house, divorcing her.

In her absence, not able to endure the shame inflicted by his daughter, Aiman's father passes away. Aiman then returns home to find her father's death. Since her father had wished to forgive Aiman, both her mother and brother Rashid pardon Aiman, giving her a chance to restart her life. On the other hand, Awais also marries another woman, Raniya.

After some time, Aiman gives birth to a daughter named Aisha. Rashid's efforts go in vain when Awais refuses to accept her daughter. However, knowing the truth about Aiman and Awais's nature, Raniya too gets a divorce from him. After the death of her mother, Aiman's misery aggravates as her bhabhi; Shabana maltreats her though Rashid's attitude towards her is fair. As a result, she leaves home and starts living separately with her daughter.

Time lapses and Aisha is young now. In the absence of a father, she has to endure a bitter societal attitude. However, she does not pay heed to it acting upon her mother's advice. Meanwhile, Awais becomes a victim of the growing repentance and comes to meet his daughter in the university. After that, Aiman reveals the truth to distraught Aisha about her father. Rashid's children; Murad and Nimra are young, too. Aisha becomes the love interest of her university mate; Imran but she hesitates to respond to him knowing the bitter truth about her mother. Aiman, too, fears the same ill-fate for her dear daughter. Aisha's cousin, Nimra is jealous to know the love affair between the two and starts plotting against Aisha in order to marry Imran herself.

In the meantime, Aiman gets the realization that she has got cancer and is rushed to the hospital. Rashid too dies sometime after knowing his sister's illness. Aiman entrusts Awais with the responsibility of taking care of Aisha. Aisha and Imran get married in the hospital. Nimra makes a successful suicidal attempt in desperation knowing Aisha's Nikah. In the end, Aiman too dies due to the fatal disease.

== Cast ==
- Saheefa Jabbar Khattak as Aiman
- Affan Waheed as Awais
- Saboor Aly as Aisha; Aiman's daughter
- Hassan Hayat as Imran
- Nazli Nasr as Seema; Imran's mother
- Saba Hameed as Bano
- Nadia Afgan as Shabana
- Kashif Mehmood as Rashid
- Salman Shahid as Murad
- Uzma Gillani as Mrs. Shehrazi
- Ghana Ali as Raniya; Awais's Second Wife
- Umar Cheema as Rahim; Shabana and Rashid's son
- Nimra Khan as Sidra; Shabana and Rashid's daughter
- Behroze Sabzwari as Mr. Shehrazi; Imran's father
