= Zeba Ali =

Pakistani television actress and model

- زیبا علی
- Born: Karachi, Sindh
- Occupations: Actress, Model
- Spouse: single

Zeba Ali or Zeba Ali Sheikh (Urdu: زیبا علی) is a Pakistani television actress and model. She started her career as model and has appeared in television serials including Mutthi Bhar Mitti, Husn Bay Hijab and Man-O-Salwa.

== Career ==
Ali started her career as a model in 2001. Her debut in television was Aaina, which aired on TV ONE. Ali was a contestant in season 1 of ARY Digital's reality show Madventures.

== Filmography ==
- Aaina
- Husn Bay Hijab
- Lahore Junction
- Madventures
- Man-O-Salwa
- Meri Behan Meri Devrani
- Meri Zaat Zarra-e-Benishan
- Mujhay Roothnay Na Daina
- Mutthi Bhar Mitti
- Pyari Shammo
- Tere Aaney Ke Baad
- Tum Ho Keh Chup
- Meri Behan Meri Dewrani

== Awards and nominations ==
- Nominee: Best Actress Drama Serial in a Supporting Role in The 1st Indus Drama Awards 2005
