= Beti (TV series) =

- Genre: Serial drama
- Created by: Abdullah Seja
- Written by: Sophia Khurram
- Directed by: Mohsin Mirza
- Starring: Saheefa Jabbar Khattak; Fahad Mirza; Asma Abbas
- Country of origin: Pakistan
- Original language: Urdu
- No. of episodes: 24

Production
- Producer: Abdullah Seja
- Production locations: Karachi, Sindh
- Camera setup: Multi-camera setup
- Production company: Idream Entertainment

Original release
- Network: ARY Digital
- Release: 11 December 2018 – 26 February 2019

Beti (Urdu: بیٹی; lit: Daughter) is a Pakistani television series created by Abdullah Seja under their production house Idream Entertainment. It is written by Sophia Khurram and directed by Mohsin Mirza. Saheefa Jabbar Khattak and Fahad Mirza star as Maryam and Azhar, respectively. The show began airing in December 2018.

== Synopsis ==
Maryam (Saheefa Jabbar Khattak) is a bright university student who lives with her single mother. After a romantic courtship with her classmate Azhar (Fahad Mirza), she expresses her wish to marry him. Azhar's family consists of his tyrannical grandmother Shahana (Asma Abbas), his parents Hashim (Javed Sheikh) and Fareeda (Naima Khan), his older brother Taimoor (Hassan Ahmed) and Taimoor's pregnant wife Sonia (Zainab Ahmed). Azhar warns Maryam that his family is not like hers, but she accepts this challenge and the two are married. Maryam soon learns that she is expecting. When Sonia prematurely gives birth to a girl, she is coerced by the family into taking her daughter off life support because of her gender. Maryam is disgusted upon realizing that Shahana is a firm follower of a devious guru and wishes for only sons in the family. She fears for her future when she discovers that she is expecting a girl.

== Cast ==
- Saheefa Jabbar Khattak as Maryam
- Fahad Mirza as Azhar, Maryam's husband
- Asma Abbas as Shahana Dadi, Azhar and Taimoor's grandmother
- Jawed Sheikh as Hashmat, Azhar and Taimoor's father
- Naima Khan as Fareeda, Azhar and Taimoor's mother
- Hassan Ahmed as Taimoor, Azhar's elder brother
- Zainab Ahmed as Sonia, Taimoor's wife
- Abeer Qureshi as Naila, Azhar's 2nd wife
- Ismat Zaidi as Maryam's mother
- Farah Nadir as Shahana's friend

== Production ==
In an earlier interview with The Express Tribune, Khattak said about the character she will be playing, "My character’s in-laws have a conservative mindset and are adamant on their preference of a boy over a girl. There is a sigh of relief as her husband is supportive and has a different mindset from his family."

== Awards and nominations ==
Date of ceremony	Award	Category	Recipient(s) and nominee(s)	Result	Ref.
December 31, 2020	Lux Style Awards	Best Emerging Talent	Saheefa Jabbar Khattak	Nominated	
