= Mithat =

Mithat is a variant of the Arabic name Midhat given name for males. People named Mithat include:

- Mithat Bayrak, Turkish sport wrestler
- Mithat Demirel, German basketball player
- Mithat Sancar, Kurdish–Turkish politician
- Mithat Yıldırım (born 1966), Turkish cross-country skier

See also

- Midhat
