= Mutthi Bhar Mitti =

Pakistani telefilm produced by Momina Duraid

- The opening title screen for Mutthi Bhar Mitti
- Genre: Patriotism
- Written by: Umera Ahmad
- Directed by: Haissam Hussain
- Starring: Qavi Khan; Khayyam Sarhadi; Faisal Qureshi; Samina Peerzada; Farhan Ali Agha; Tipu Sharif; Zhalay Sarhadi; Qaiser Naqvi; Jahanara Hai

Production
- Producer: Momina Duraid
- Production locations: Bin Qasim Park, Karachi
- Running time: 90-95 min. approx.

Original release
- Release: 14 August 2008

Mutthi Bhar Mitti (Urdu: مٹھی بھر مٹی, lit. 'A Fistful of Dirt') is a Pakistani telefilm that premiered on Hum TV on 14 August 2008. It was directed by Haissam Hussain and written by novelist and screenplay writer Umera Ahmad.

As a framing device, the main character, Jamal (played by Qavi Khan) with narration by Umera Ahmad, in the year 2008 recounts to himself the events that led to him leaving India and migrating to Pakistan after the partition of India, which explains the title and allows for a narration in the past tense. The other main characters include Mubarak Ali (Khayyam Sarhadi), Muzaffar (Faisal Qureshi) and Salima (Samina Peerzada).

== Synopsis ==
Khayyam Sarhadi in Mutthi Bhar Mitti

At the time of British India, Mubarak Ali, a hardcore supporter of India National Congress lives with his family in a village of Patiala. He loathes the politics of Muslim League and says their dream of a separate homeland for Muslims of India is a mere farce. However his son Muzaffar is a young patriotic lad who strongly supports the Muslim League's idea and admires its leader, Muhammad Ali Jinnah. Muzaffar goes to study at Aligarh University, a hub for all Muslims working for the idea of Pakistan. Whilst he is there, his passion only increases and when he returns home he goes door to door to campaign for the upcoming election that would articulate the demand for Pakistan and effectively act as a referendum for that. Muslim League eventually achieves the sweeping victory in the Muslims-majority regions, and Muslims in many other regions of Pakistan who supported Pakistan have to leave India. Muzaffar and his entire family has been slaughtered, except his father and young brother Jamal. While the father himself kills the younger sisters of Jamal and Muzaffar, leading Jamal to become away from his father. They then migrate to Pakistan where the land is alloted to him. Jamal completes his secondary education from a college of Lahore, and then moves to abroad for a higher education. His father however fixes his marriage with Salima. After marriage, he leaves for abroad for his Doctor of Philosophy. The father falls ill and Salima takes care of him. Jamal retunrs after the death of his father. After days, Jamal asks Salima that whether his father has left any message for him to which Salima brings a handful of dust in cloth poch and tells that he has left this for you and asked to return to Pakistan for this soil. Jamal weeps copiously after this.

At dinning table, Jamal entangles in a heated argument with his elder son, Afaq when he tells him that he will not retun to Pakistan after his job in United States stating his difficulty to adjust here.

== Cast ==
- Mohammed Qavi Khan as Jamal
- Khayyam Sarhadi as Chaudhary Mubarak Ali
- Faisal Qureshi as Muzaffar
- Samina Peerzada as Salima Bano
- Farhan Ali Agha
- Qaiser Naqvi as Muzaffar and Jamal's mother
- Zhalay Sarhadi
- Zeba Ali as Shakeela
- Jahanara Hai as wife of Jamal's colleague
- Tipu Sharif
- Hashim Butt as Sardar Sarbang Singh
- Sohail Omer
- Fahad Mirza
- Natasha

== Supporting characters ==
There are many supporting actors in the telefilm who play brief but important roles, which serve as a backdrop of a defeatist people who all want to run away from the country. It includes Salman Saquib (Mani) and Azfar Ali as Bobby and Imran, their screen-names from the sitcom Sub Set Hai.

Mustafa Qureshi plays a passer-by who is talking about leaving the country. Jahan Ara Hayee and Aijazz Aslam also play similar characters.
