= Gul-o-Gulzar =

Pakistani television series

- Kinza Hashmi (left) and Saboor Ali
- گل و گلزار
- Genre: Serial drama
- Written by: Hasan Umar
- Screenplay by: Umera Ahmed
- Directed by: Saqib Khan
- Starring: Saboor Ali; Kinza Hashmi; Omer Shahzad; Paras Masroor
- Country of origin: Pakistan
- Original language: Urdu
- No. of episodes: 27

Production
- Producers: Humayun Saeed; Shahzad Nasib
- Camera setup: Multi-camera setup
- Production company: Six Sigma Plus

Original release
- Network: ARY Digital
- Release: 13 June – 12 December 2019

Gul-o-Gulzar (Urdu: گل و گلزار, lit. 'Gul and Gulzar') is a 2019 Pakistani television series created by Humayun Saeed and Shahzad Nasib under their production house Six Sigma Plus. It focuses on the life of two best friends turned enemies; Gul and Gulzar played by Saboor Aly and Kinza Hashmi, respectively. The serial aired every Thursday evening on ARY Digital.

It was broadcast by MBC Bollywood in Arab countries under the title جل و جلزار. The series is available on Indian OTT Platform MX Player.

== Synopsis ==
Gulzar is a studious and innocent college student who wants to pass her exams, and make her brother and her whole family proud. Gul on the other hand is a cunning, backstabbing girl who wants money and would stop at nothing to achieve her greedy goals.

== Cast ==
- Saboor Aly as Gul Chaudhary
- Kinza Hashmi as Gulzar Iqbal
- Omer Shahzad as Adil; Gul's love interest
- Mariam Mirza as Adil’s mother
- Paras Masroor as Jamal; Gulzar's husband
- Firdous Jamal as Master Iqbal; Afaq and Gulzar's father
- Kanwar Nafees as Afaq; Gulzar's brother
- Sabiha Hashmi as Jamal's mother; Gulzar's mother-in-law
- Nayyar Ejaz as Kifayat Chaudhary; Gul's father
- Shaista Jabeen as Kaneez Chaudhary; Gul's mother
- Arjumand Azhar as Adil's father
- Fahima Awan as Zeba; Afaq's wife
- Aliya Ali as Mahjabeen; Adil's second wife

== Nominations ==
Year	Awards	Category	Recipient	Result
7 February 2020	Pakistan International Screen Awards	Best Television Actress Critic's choice	Saboor Aly	Nominated
