= Fahad Mirza =

Pakistani actor, model and plastic surgeon

- Born: Fahad Zubair Mirza; 26 April 1981 (age 45); Karachi, Sindh, Pakistan
- Education: Dow Medical College
- Occupations: Actor; Model; Plastic surgeon; Sculptor
- Years active: 2007-present
- Spouse: Sarwat Gillani (m. 2014)
- Children: 3

Fahad Mirza (Urdu: فہد مرزا; born 26 April 1981) is a Pakistani actor, model, plastic surgeon and sculptor.

He is best known for his debut role as Essa in 2012 drama serial Bari Aapa. He has also appeared in Mutthi Bhar Mitti (2008), Main Deewani (2014) and Shanakht (2014) for which he was nominated as Hum Award for Best Supporting Actor at 3rd Hum Awards.

== Early life and education ==
Fahad was born on 26 April 1981 to a Mughal family in Karachi, Pakistan. He did his graduation in MBBS from Dow Medical College and trained in Plastic and Reconstructive Surgery from Liaquat National Hospital.

== Career ==
Fahad started his career by modeling in 2007 during his studies and then auditioned for a role in Hum TV's drama serial Bari Aapa and eventually got a role, previously he had a small role in a telefilm Mutthi Bhar Mitti by Umera Ahmed.

In 2014 he appeared in two drama serial of Hum TV, Main Deewani and Shanakht for which he garnered widespread acclaim and positive response. In addition to acting, he also appeared in several fashion shows and television commercials. In 2014, he starred alongside his wife Sarwat Gillani in the highly acclaimed short film Baat Cheet.

Fahad met actress Sarwat Gilani in 2003 when both were students and began a relationship that lasted for three years. After ten years in 2013, Fahad met Sarwat at her theater play Dhaani where afterwards both got engaged on 11 October 2013 and they wed on 14 August 2014 in a private ceremony. Together they have two sons.

== Filmography ==
=== Television serials ===
| Year | Drama | Role |
|---|---|---|
| 2008 | Mutthi Bhar Mitti | |
| 2012 | Bari Aapa | |
| 2014 | Main Deewani | |
| 2014 | Shanakht | Rohaan |
| 2017 | Bilqees Urf Bitto | Sarmad |
| 2018 | Naulakha | |
| 2018 | Beti | Azhar |
| 2021 | Parizaad | Dr. Sharjeel |

=== Films ===
| Year | Title | Role | Notes |
|---|---|---|---|
| 2015 | Baat Cheet | Asim | Short film |

=== Webseries ===
| Year | Title | Role | Notes |
|---|---|---|---|
| 2020 | Churails | Guest | |

=== TV commercials ===
- Oreo
- Tapal Tea

== Awards and nominations ==
| Yer | Award ceremony | Category | Results | Ref |
|---|---|---|---|---|
| 2014 | 3rd Hum Awards | Hum Award for Best Supporting Actor | Nominated | |
