= Mehmoodabad Ki Malkain =

- Genre: Drama
- Written by: Zoha Hasan
- Directed by: Nain Maniar
- Starring: Anita Campher; Shahid Naqvi; Natasha Saleem; Sajal Aly; Saboor Aly; Farah Ali
- Opening theme: "Sapne Me ladti Malkain" by Afshah Nawaz
- Composer: Waqar Ali
- Country of origin: Pakistan
- Original language: Urdu
- No. of episodes: 327

Production
- Producers: Samina Humayun Saeed; Shehzad Nasib
- Production company: Six Sigma Entertainment

Original release
- Network: ARY Digital
- Release: 27 February 2011 – 1 October 2012

Mehmoodabad Ki Malkain (Urdu: محمود آباد کی ملکائیں, lit. 'The Queens of Mehmoodabad') is a Pakistani soap opera television series aired on ARY Digital. Apart from some actors, the series included a cast of new actors. The show also aired on ARY Zauq in 2012 and 2019 on ARY Zindagi. The series marked Sajal Aly's and Saboor Aly's first lead role.

== Plot ==
The story revolves around Zahid Ahmed's family, his three daughters, two sons, and his responsible wife, Shah Jahan. Zahid has always failed to satisfy and fulfil his responsibilities as a father and a husband and has been scolding his daughters for not following the Islamic rituals honestly. Whereas his daughters have almost no inclination towards their father's teachings and ultimately turn out to be rebellious against him.

The second plot of the story is concerned with Shabbir, the neighbor of Zahid and his two sisters, who are compelled to live in Zahid's house for some time due to some financial issues. Hence the title highlights the character of five girls of diverse natures living under one roof.

== Synopsis ==
Zahid (Shahid Naqvi) and Shah Jehan (Anita Campher) have three daughters Nasreen (Farah Ali), Yasmeen (Sana Ismail) and Afreen (Sajal Aly). All of them have a world full of dreams. The family is poor and lives in Mehmoodabad, one of the poorest areas of Karachi. Their mother loves Afreen the most, which makes the other sisters very jealous. Zahid is jobless and becomes a religious scholar, and he scolds his children for not following Islamic rules. Yasmeen works in a factory. Their elder son Nasir (Babar Khan) loves Shabbir's sister Sajida (Natasha Saleem) and wants to marry her. The other son Owais (Naveed Raza), loves Arsala, a rich girl, and they both run away and get married. Afreen goes to sing a song in a club which results in a beating given by her mother. Overall this drama focuses on the true colours of Mehmoodabad and describes the feelings of people and the nature of the true story of living there.

== Cast ==
- Anita Campher as Shah Jehan
- Shahid Naqvi as Zahid
- Natasha Saleem as Sajida
- Sajal Aly as Afreen
- Saboor Aly as Rimsha
- Farah Ali as Nasreen
- Sana Ismail as Yasmeen
- Babar Khan as Nasir
- Naveed Raza as Owais
- Farhad Farid as Shabbir
- Asad Zaman Khan

== Production ==
The series marked the acting debut for Sajal Aly. It was at Humayun Saeed's production house where Aly auditioned for the series and was ultimately chosen, driven by her passion for acting and desire to support her family. As a part of the audition process, she was interviewed by Anjum Shahzad.

== Released ==
Mehmoodabad KI Malkain replaced Bahu Rani and it aired Monday to Thursday at 9:30 pm on ARY Digital

== Awards ==
Year	Awards	Category	Recipient	Results	Ref.
2013	Pakistan Media Awards	Best Soap	Mehmoodabad Ki Malkain	Won	
