= Meri Zaat Zarra-e-Benishan =

2009 Pakistani television series

- Promotional image
- Genre: Tragedy; Family drama
- Written by: Umera Ahmad
- Directed by: Babar Javed
- Starring: Samiya Mumtaz; Faysal Qureshi; Adnan Siddiqui; Sarwat Gilani; Imran Abbas Naqvi; Samina Peerzada; Ismat Zaidi
- Theme music composer: Farrukh Abid; Shoaib Farrukh
- Opening theme: Meri Zaat written by Sabir Zafar performed by Rahat Fateh Ali Khan
- Composer: Mohsin Javed
- Country of origin: Pakistan
- Original language: Urdu
- No. of episodes: 20

Production
- Producers: Abdullah Kadwani; Humayun Saeed
- Cinematography: Ilyas Kashmiri
- Editor: Faisal Gulzar
- Running time: 35–40 minutes
- Production company: 7th Sky Entertainment

Original release
- Network: Geo Entertainment
- Release: 28 November 2009 – 22 May 2010

Meri Zaat Zarra-e-Benishan (Urdu: ميرى ذات ذرۂ بے نشاں) is a Pakistani television drama series, directed by Babar Javed and produced by Abdullah Kadwani and Humayun Saeed, based on Umera Ahmad's novel of the same name. The series is about Saba, a woman torn between faith, fidelity and forgiveness and the story spans across two generations and then focuses on her daughter, Sara. It has an ensemble cast consisting of Samiya Mumtaz, Samina Peerzada, Sarwat Gillani, Mehreen Raheel, Faisal Qureshi, Adnan Siddiqui, Imran Abbas, Ismat Zaidi, and Humayun Saeed.

== Plot ==
Sara (Sarwat Gilani) arrives at the home of Arfeen Abbas (Faisal Qureshi). She gives him a letter, which upsets him when he reads it. Arfeen asks Sara where "Saba" is, and she replies that she died four days earlier. He collapses, regains his composure and asks Sara for her address so they can collect her belongings. When they arrive at Sara's modest home, they go to Saba's bedroom to gather her things. Arfeen finds a pair of Saba's old sandals and begins to cry; Sara wonders why he is so grief-stricken. They return to Arfeen's estate, and he introduces Sara to his son, Haider (Imran Abbas). We learn that Saba was Sara's mother and Arfeen's cousin. Although Saba and Arfeen were in love, Saba was mistreated by most of the family—especially Arfeen's mother —because of her liberal views. When Arfeen tells his parents he wants to marry Saba, they object. He says that if he cannot marry her, he will not at all marry, and they relent.

Sara and Haider become friends, and she becomes accustomed to living in Arfeen's home, although she wonders what happened between him and her mother; when she visits her family, no one will tell her. Arfeen, who does not want Sara to leave his house, wants Haider to marry her. Haider is reluctant to marry but finally agrees; Sara also agrees to the union. On their wedding day, she disappears. Arfeen panics and asks Sara's aunt Aqsa if she told Sara what had happened to her mother; she says no. Arfeen tells Haider the story.

Saba and Arfeen married, but his parents and sisters were unhappy. Arfeen's mother sends him to get his younger sister from her in-laws' house the day before Saba's rukhsati and asks Saba to make up the spare bedroom. Saba finds Aadil, a cousin who was attracted to her and whom Arfeen's mother had asked to fix a curtain rod, in the bedroom. While they work, the bedroom door closes; they pound on the door to no avail. Arfeen's mother and most of the family then come to the door, and she accuses Saba and Aadil of inappropriate behaviour. No one believes their denials, and Arfeen's father threatens to kill them both. Aadil's mother begs him to run for his life, and Saba is beaten mercilessly; not even her mother and sister believe her. Arfeen hears about this and questions Saba, who maintains her innocence. He asks her to swear on the Quran that she is innocent; she agrees that his mother will also take the oath. Saba mistakenly thinks her aunt is too religious to lie on the Quran. However, she does lie while keeping her hand on the Quran, and Arfeen reluctantly divorces her right there.

He marries a woman in the United States but is still in love with Saba; she is married off to an abusive 50-year-old father of four, who mistrusts her due to Arfeen's father. No one from her family visits her during her second marriage. Saba becomes pregnant, and her husband refusing to believe that the child is his, divorces her. She becomes a maid, gives birth to a girl, and blames herself for what has happened.

Arfeen and his wife have a son, but their marriage is unhappy. In Pakistan, one of Arfeen's sisters loses her husband; his younger sister is divorced, and his mother is diagnosed with cancer. On her deathbed, she admits that she lied because she was jealous of Saba. Saba visits her aunt before she dies and tells everyone that she's forgiven them. Arfeen divorces his wife and asks Saba to marry him; she says she still loves him but cannot trust him. Her parents ask her to return to them, but she disappears.

Several years later, Saba works at a garment factory owned by Arfeen. She is friendly with Haider but covers her face to hide her identity until her death. In the present, it is found out that Sara overheard how her mother was treated by Arfeen's family and ran away. Haider tracks her down and explains everything and the couple begins a new life.

== Cast ==
=== First generation ===
- Khayyam Sarhadi as Qasim Abbas - Farid and Kareem's oldest brother; Arfeen, Asiya, Aneela's father; Shakeela's husband.
- Shehryar Zaidi as Farid Abbas - Aadil's father, Qasim's younger brother; Kareem's older brother; Samra's husband.
- Shakeel as Kareem Abbas - Saba and Aqsa's father; Qasim and Farid's youngest brother; Safia's husband.
- Samina Peerzada as Shakeela Abbas - Arfeen, Asiya and Aneela's mother; Qasim's wife.
- Afshan Qureshi as Samra Abbas - Farid's wife; Aadil's mother.
- Ismat Zaidi as Safia Abbas - Saba and Aqsa's mother; Kareem's wife.

=== Second generation ===
- Samiya Mumtaz as Saba Kareem - Arfeen and Amin's ex wife; Safia and Kareem's daughter; Aqsa's sister; Sara's mother.
- Faisal Qureshi as Arfeen Abbas - Saba and Mahroosh's ex husband; Qasim and Shakeela's son; Aasiya and Aneela's brother; Hayder's father.
- Adnan Siddiqui as Aadil Abbas - Farid and Samra's son; Arfeen, Aasiya, Aneela, Saba and Aqsa's cousin.
- Zeba Ali as Asiya Abbas - Qasim and Shakeela's daughter; Arfeen and Aneela's sister.
- Rashid Farooqui as Amin - Saba's second ex husband; Sara's father.
- Mehreen Raheel as Mahroosh - Arfeen's second ex wife; Hayder's mother.
- Humayun Saeed as Shuja - Arfeen and Mahroosh's friend.
- Lubna Aslam as Aneela Abbas - Qasim and Shakeela's daughter; Arfeen and Asiya's sister.
- Fatima Effendi as Aqsa Kareem (Younger) - Kareem and Safia's daughter; Saba's sister.
- Azra Mohyeddin as Bibi - Saba works in her house.

=== Third generation ===
- Imran Abbas Naqvi as Hayder Abbas - Mahroosh and Arfeen's son; Sara's husband.
- Sarwat Gilani as Sara Amin - Saba and Amin's daughter; Hayder's wife.
- Nausheen Shah as Aqsa Kareem (Older) - Kareem and Safia's daughter; Saba's sister.
- Sanam Agha as Maya - Hayder's friend.

=== Guest appearance ===
- Ayesha Omar as Gul - Sara's friend.

== Production ==
Screenwriter Umera Ahmad noticed theater actress Samiya Mumtaz as a host in a talk show and suggested her to co-producer Humayun Saeed as the lead in the television adaptation of her book Meri Zaat Zarra-e-Benishaan. Mumtaz accepted the offer after discussing it with her friend Nadia Jamil.

== Theme song ==
The series' theme song, "Meri Zaat Zarra-e-Benishan", was written by Sabir Zafar and sung by Rahat Fateh Ali Khan.

== Reception ==
=== Viewership ===
It received the highest TRPs of 5 which was declared as unprecedented by the producer. According to producer Abdullah Kadwani, "The serial received a phenomenal 1,68,000 emails and 6.3 million hits on various websites." A local salesman after one year of the serial, also reported that they sold an average of 100 DVDs of the series every month.

=== Critical reception ===
Shahrezad Samiuddin of Dawn acknowledged the depth and literary seriousness of the series, referring to the "profound" meaning of its title but questioned the entertainment value of such depressing stories.

A reviewer from Dawn praised the acting performances of Mumtaz and Gillani and the title song by Rahat Fateh Ali Khan but criticised it for the depiction of the time period. In March 2020, Sadaf Haider listed it among the "10 iconic Pakistani TV dramas".

== International broadcast ==
The 20-episode series was telecast on Zindagi in India as Kaisi Ye Qayamat from 15 December 2014 to 6 January 2015.

== Awards ==
Year	Awards	Category	Recipient(s) & nominee(s)	Result	Ref.
2011	Lux Style Awards	Best TV Actor (Satellite)	Faysal Quraishi	Won	
2011	Lux Style Awards	Best TV Actress (Satellite)	Samiya Mumtaz	Nominated	
2011	Lux Style Awards	Best TV Writer	Umera Ahmed	Won	
