= Sadia Ghaffar =

Pakistani actress and model (born 1993)

- Born: Karachi, Sindh, Pakistan
- Occupation: Actress
- Years active: 2011–present
- Spouse: Hassan Hayat (m. 2020)

Sadia Ghaffar is a Pakistani actress and model known for her work in Urdu television serials. She is known for her role as Shehzadi in Kis Din Mera Viyah Howay Ga and Ramsha in Aisi Hai Tanhai.

== Television ==
Year	Title	Role	Network	Refs
2011	Kis Din Mera Viyah Howay Ga	Shehzadi	Geo TV	
2011	Maat	Munazzah	Hum TV	
2012	Jahez		Geo TV	
2012	Kitni Girhain Baaki Hain	Aisha	Hum TV	
2013–2014	Kalmoohi		Geo TV	
2014–2015	Meka Aur Susral	Anila	ARY Zindagi	
2015	Akeli		Hum TV	
2015–2016	Gul-e-Rana	Laila	Hum TV	
2016	Baba Ki Rani	Rabia	ARY Zindagi	
2016	Khushaal Susraal	Erum	ARY Zindagi	
2016	Joru Ka Ghulam		Geo TV	
2017	Bilqees Urf Bitto		Urdu 1	
2017	Aisi Hai Tanhai	Ramsha	ARY Digital	
2018	Kabhi Band Kabhi Baja	Recurring (Anthology)	Express TV	
2019	Gustakh Dil		Express TV	
