= Shadi Aur Tum Say? =

- Opening title screen
- Genre: Comedy
- Written by: Mohammad Ahmed
- Directed by: Uzma Nadeem
- Starring: Imran Abbas Naqvi; Sarwat Gilani; Seemi Pasha; Mehmood Aslam; Mohammed Ahmed; Aimee

Production
- Producer: Uzma Nadeem
- Running time: 43–44 minutes

Original release
- Network: Hum TV
- Release: February 2010

Shadi Aur Tum Say? is and Urdu Pakistani comedy telefilm which was premiered in February 2010 on Hum TV. It was written by Mohammed Ahmed and directed by Uzma Nadeem.

== Cast and characters ==
- Imran Abbas Naqvi portrays Sami who loves a girl named Samawi, but doesn't have the courage to marry her against his parents' wishes.
- Sarwat Gilani portrays Laila who aspire to become a filmmaker and believes that being in a marriage wouldn't let her achieve this goal.
- Mehmood Aslam and Seemi Pasha portray the role of Sami's parents.
- Mohammed Ahmed portrays Faiz - the annoying writer.
- Aimee plays Samawi - Sami's love interest.

== Plot ==
Sami and Laila are cousins who unwillingly get tangled in an arranged marriage - on their families persistence. Laila knows about Sami being in love with another girl called Samawi, but she is totally cool with it. The only thing she worries about is her financier running away if she lets go of the chance to make a movie this time. She - along with Sami - devises a plan to do everything possible to somehow make Sami's parents hate her. She cooks food which her in-laws hate and pretends to be an alcoholic and a smoker. Sami's parents know something's fishy because they have known Laila since her childhood. His father whilst eavesdropping finds out all about their scheming and offers a fag to Laila the next morning only to make her cough over it. Sami's mother also goes along with her husband's plan and advises Sami to divorce his new wife, as soon as possible. Their plan works out well, making Sami and Laila realise that they actually do fancy each other and would rather stay married.
