= Badi Aapa =

- Genre: Family drama
- Written by: Samira Fazal
- Directed by: Saife Hassan
- Starring: Savera Nadeem; Nauman Ijaz; Ayesha Khan; Arjumand Rahim; Waqas Khan; Fahad Mirza; Mustafa Changazi; Sarah Khan; Syed Jibran; Madiha Rizvi; Sajida Syed
- Opening theme: Dil-e-Naadan sung by Tina Sani
- Composers: Shoaib Farrukh; Farrukh Abid
- Country of origin: Pakistan
- Original language: Urdu
- No. of episodes: 22

Production
- Producer: Momina Duraid
- Running time: Approx. 40-45 minutes

Original release
- Network: Hum TV
- Release: 22 September 2012 – 17 February 2013

Bari Aapa (transl. Elder sister) is a Pakistani television series first broadcast on Hum TV. Written by Samira Fazal, directed by Saife Hassan, and produced by Momina Duraid, the 22-episode series premiered on 22 September 2012 and ended on 16 February 2013. It featured actors Savera Nadeem, Nauman Ejaz, Ayesha Khan, Arjumand Rahim, Sajida Syed, Waqas Khan, Fahad Mirza, Mustafa Changazi, Sarah Khan (in her acting debut), Syed Jibran, and Madiha Rizvi. The series revolves around a strict woman, Zubeida, whose dictatorial nature and decisions affect her family and those around her.

== Plot ==
Zubeida, more commonly known as Bari Aapa, possesses a rigid and dictatorial nature, and her husband, Farmaan, avoids her. Zubeida's only daughter, Sharmeen, is in love with Essa, and wants to marry him, but Zubeida doesn't agree to the union. Sharmeen decides that the only way to convince her mother is to talk to her uncle, Ghazanfar, who is the only person Zubeida listens to because Zubeida and Ghazanfar used to like each other when they were young. But at the same time, Sharmeen gets to know that her mother has already decided to get her married to Ghazanfar's son, Adeel, who happens to be Zubeida's nephew. Adeel had always loved Sharmeen. But as Adeel's mother, Firdous, Zubeida's younger sister, doesn't want him to marry Sharmeen. When Adeel refuses to marry her, Zubeida gets angry with her younger sister. Meanwhile, she discovers that her husband has, for the second time, secretly married a lady, Neelam.

Zubeida believes that Ghanzanfar is still in love with her and will leave his family for her, so she demands a divorce. Farmaan begs her to stay, but Zubeida insists and tells him about Ghanzanfar still loving her.

On her way to Ghanzanfar, Zubeida recounts the loving moments shared between the two. On arrival at her sister's home, she's surprised that her sister is back and that not only does Ghanzanfar care for his wife, but he only sees Zubeida as his wife's sister and nothing more. Zubeida, embarrassed, makes her excuses and returns home.

On arrival at home, her husband tells her that he has already divorced her and is moving out with Neelam.

== Cast ==
- Savera Nadeem as Zubeida " Bari Aapa"
- Nauman Ijaz as Farman, Zubeida's husband
- Ayesha Khan as Neelam, Farman's second wife
- Sajida Syed as Amma, Zubeida's mother
- Arjumand Rahim as Firdous "Choti Aapa", Zubeida's younger sister
- Waqas Khan as Ghazanfar, Firdous's husband
- Syed Jibran as Shakeel, Zubeida's younger brother
- Madiha Rizvi as Riffat, Shakeel's wife
- Mustafa Changazi as Adeel, Firdous's son
- Sarah Khan as Sharmeen, Zubeida's daughter
- Fahad Mirza as Essa, Love interest of Sharmeen

== Production ==
Savera Nadeem was chosen to portray the titular role, who was drawn to the role because of the gripping dialogues and the character's portrayal, which aligned with her vision. Sarah Khan made her acting debut with a supporting role in the series. Director Saife Hassan disclosed that he had creative differences with Nauman Ijaz during the filming of the series, but they later reconciled when Ijaz acknowledged Saife's work in his award acceptance speech.

== Broadcast and release ==
Bari Aapa premiered on Hum TV from September 1, 2012, to February 17, 2013. A Pashto-dubbed version, titled مشرہ خور, aired on Hum Pashto 1. The show aired in India on Zindagi, premiering on November 7, 2014, and re-running from April 13 to May 7 due to its popularity. The show was available on iflix from 2017 to 2019 and can now be streamed on Eros Now and ZEE5.

== Awards and nominations ==
Year	Awards	Category	Nominee(s)/ Recipient(s)	Result	Ref.
2013	Hum Awards	Best Actor	Nauman Ijaz	Won	
