= Teri Meri Kahani (TV series) =

Pakistani TV series

- Genre: Romantic drama
- Written by: Sumaira Hameed
- Directed by: Ali Faizan
- Starring: Saheefa Jabbar Khattak; Azfar Rehman; Saboor Aly; Ayesha Gul
- Theme music composer: Nouman Javaid
- Opening theme: "Teri Meri Kahani" sung and lyrics by: Nouman Javaid
- Country of origin: Pakistan
- Original language: Urdu
- No. of seasons: 1
- No. of episodes: 36

Production
- Camera setup: Multi-camera setup
- Production company: MD Productions

Original release
- Network: Hum TV
- Release: 21 February – 21 June 2018

Related
- Main Maa Nahi Banna Chahti

Teri Meri Kahani (Urdu: تیری میری کہانی; lit: Your Story and Mine) is a Pakistani television series produced by Momina Duraid under MD Productions and directed by Ali Faizan. It was first aired on 21 February 2018 on Hum TV. It stars model-turned actor Saheefa Jabbar Khattak and Azfar Rehman in lead roles and Saboor Aly as second lead.

It marks the second on-screen appearance of Laila Wasti and Noman Masood after Khwab Saraye.

== Plot ==
It is the story of a girl (Deena) who lives in London with her mother. She is married to a man named Hamza who cheats on her and beats her. Deena decides to divorce him and go to Pakistan to start a new life with her father. Her father and mother were separated. She goes to Pakistan and tells her father about everything that her mother and husband did with her.

Her father (Nawaz) talked about this matter with his best friend Shujat. Deena's chachi (Asifa) was not happy with this all as she did not want Deena to come to Pakistan. Deena's younger cousin Fareed falls in love with her.

On the other hand, this drama revolves around a girl named Sofia who is an orphan and lives with her sister and mother. She is in love with her colleague Ibrahim (son of Shujat) and they both decide to marry. On listening to the story of Nawaz's daughter, Shujat decides to get his son Ibrahim married with Deena but Ibrahim and his mother want Sofia to be his wife. Shujat forces his son and Deena marries Ibrahim. This marriage makes Fareed and Sofia heartbroken. Sofia is depressed and in critical condition but after some days everything gets fine. Ibrahim is unaware of Deena's first marriage and gives her a tough time. His behaviour is also very rude and he shows his hatred towards her. Najma is also not happy with his son's marriage and she also insults Deena a lot. Deena's efforts bear fruit and she earns a soft spot in her in-laws' hearts. Her efforts also bring about a positive change in Ibrahim's attitude towards her. Rabia is left heartbroken in London and she decides to go back to Pakistan to live with her husband Nawaz and daughter Deena. Hamza also goes back to Pakistan. There he falls in love with Sofia and decides to marry her. Deena and Sofia become best friends. On the wedding day of Sofia and Hamza, Ibrahim finds out about the relationship between Deena and Hamza. Ibrahim does not know that Deena was Hamza's ex-wife, but thinks that Deena has cheated on him.

He insults his wife in front of everyone and Sofia's wedding is destroyed and she thinks Hamza betrayed her. Due to all this drama Nawaz gets a heart attack and dies. Ibrahim says that he will divorce Deena.

== Cast ==
- Saheefa Jabbar Khattak as Deena
- Azfar Rehman as Ibrahim
- Saboor Aly as Sofia
- Ayesha Gul as Asifa
- Daniyal Raheel as Hamza
- Noman Masood as Nawaz
- Laila Wasti as Rabia
- Nazli Nasr as Najima
- Mubashira Khanum as Dadi
- Fahad Rehmani as Anjam

== Production ==
Talking about her character, Saheefa said, "The name of my character is Deena, she’s returned from the UK and she’s not a typical, desi girl. However, since the masses approve of conventional roles, there is that element too."

== See also ==
- List of programs broadcast by Hum TV
