= Baat Cheet =

- Official poster for film at 68th Cannes Film Festival
- Directed by: Rayika Choudri
- Screenplay by: Rayika Choudri
- Produced by: Rayika Choudri
- Starring: Sarwat Gilani; Joshinder Chaggar; Wusat Ullah Khan; Fahad Mirza; Hammad Hasan Askari
- Cinematography: Omer Waiz
- Edited by: Omer Waiz
- Release date: 13 May 2015 (68th Cannes Film Festival)
- Running time: 10 minutes
- Country: Pakistan
- Language: Urdu

Baat Cheet (Urdu: بات چیت or French: Tête-à-Tête ; English: Tête-à-Tête) is a 2015 Pakistani comedy drama short film by Rayika Choudri. The film stars Sarwat Gilani and Joshinder Chaggar in lead roles.

The film won three Gold awards at the 2015 Documentary and Short International Movie Awards in Indonesia Baat Cheet is participating in the 2015 Short Film Corner category at the Cannes Film Festival as part of a broad showcase of short films from around the world.

== Outline ==
Anjum and Mehreen are two friends living in Karachi who meet and catch up on recent events in each other's lives. Their conversation winds impressionistically through various accounts, depicting the ways in which people cope with the challenges of ordinary life.

== Cast ==
- Sarwat Gilani as Anjum
- Joshinder Chaggar as Mehreen
- Fahad Mirza as Asim
- Shumaila Masood as Laila
- Hammad Hasan Askri as Teenage Thief
- Wusat Ullah Khan as Interviewer
- Safdar Shah as Blood Bank Security Guard
- Taha Khan as Mugger

== Awards ==
Year	Ceremony	Section Award Type	Category	Recipient(s)	Results
2015	Documentary & Short International Movie Awards - Indonesia	Documentary & Short International Movie Awards (Gold Awards)	DSIMA Gold Award for Best Director	Rayika Choudri	Won
2015	Documentary & Short International Movie Awards - Indonesia	Documentary & Short International Movie Awards (Gold Awards)	DSIMA Gold Award for Best International Short	Rayika Choudri	Won
2015	Documentary & Short International Movie Awards - Indonesia	Documentary & Short International Movie Awards (Gold Awards)	DSIMA Gold Award for Best Newcomer	Rayika Choudri	Won

== See also ==
- Cannes Film Festival
