= Midhat Sarajčić =

Bosnian footballer

Personal information
- Full name: Midhat Sarajčić
- Date of birth: 16 September 1971 (age 55)
- Place of birth: Novi Travnik, SFR Yugoslavia
- Position: Defender

Youth career
- Bratstvo Novi Travnik

Senior career*
Years	Team	Apps	(Gls)
1995-1996	NK Zenica	38	(2)
1997-1998	Travnik	34	(8)
1998-1999	Čelik Zenica	22	(0)
2000-2001	Travnik	36	(3)
2001-2003	Čelik Zenica	62	(2)
2004-2012	Travnik	142+	(3+)

International career^{‡}
2001	Bosnia and Herzegovina	1	(0)
- * Club domestic league appearances and goals ‡ National team caps and goals as of 23 June 2021

Midhat Sarajčić (born 16 September 1971) is a Bosnian retired football player.

== Club career ==
Born in Novi Travnik, he has played for local team Bratstvo Novi Travnik as well as for NK Zenica, Travnik and Čelik Zenica.

== International career ==
Sarajčić made one senior appearance for Bosnia and Herzegovina, coming on as a substitute for Ervin Smajlagić in the 2001 LG Cup final against Iran.

== Post-playing career ==
He was a member of the executive board of the Central Bosnia Canton Football Association for two terms, from 2008 to 2016. During the same period, he was a delegate in the Assembly of the Football Federation of Bosnia and Herzegovina. Since December 22, 2016, he has been a member of the executive board of the Football Federation.

At Travnik he worked as a sports director, director and president of the club.
