= Saboor Aly =

Pakistani television actress

Saboor Ali Ansari
- Born: 16 March 1995 (age 31); Lahore, Punjab, Pakistan
- Occupation: Actress
- Spouse: Ali Ansari (m. 2022)
- Children: 1
- Relatives: Sajal Aly (sister); Mariam Ansari (sister-in-law)

Saboor Ali Ansari (Urdu: صَبور علی) (born 3 March 1995) is a Pakistani actress. The younger sister of actress Sajal Aly, Saboor Ali began her acting career with the family drama Mehmoodabad Ki Malkain (2011) and received recognition with a comic role in the sitcom Mr. Shamim (2015).

Ali continued playing supporting roles in several television series and made her film debut with a romantic-comedy Actor in Law (2016), for which she earned a nomination in the Lux Style Award for Best Supporting Actress. She has since played leading roles in dramas, such as Mere Khudaya (2018), Gul-o-Gulzar (2019) and Fitrat (2020), for which she received the Lux Style Award for Best TV Actress, and Mushkil (2022), and received critical acclaim as well as the Hum Award for Best Supporting Actress for her role of a tomboy in Parizaad (2021).

== Early life and career ==
Saboor Ali was born on 3 March 1995 in Lahore, Punjab, Pakistan to Syed Ali, a businessman, and Rahat Ali, a housewife. She has an elder sister, actress Sajal Aly (born January 1993), and a younger brother, Ali Syed. Ali's father left her mother and married a second time. In an online interview, she said that she was "angry" at her father, but now shares a "close bond with [him]." She received her primary education from Rahim Yar Khan's Lahore Grammar School. For further education, she enrolled herself in a college affiliated with the Punjab University; however she deferred it to pursue acting.

She started her career with a small role in Choti Si Kahani and followed it with a supporting role in the family drama Mehmoodabad Ki Malkain on ARY Digital in 2011, in which she appeared with her sister Sajal Aly. After that she again appeared with her sister Sajal, in an episode of Kitni Girhain Baqi Hain, an anthology series on Hum TV, and was subsequently featured in Hum TV's acclaimed romantic drama Bunty I Love You, alongside Saba Qamar. In September 2016, she made her film debut with Nabeel Qureshi's socio-comedy film Actor in Law, starring Fahad Mustafa, Mehwish Hayat and Om Puri. Her portrayal of a supportive sister of Mustafa's character earned her a Best Supporting Actress nomination at the Lux Style Awards. Ali played the lead in the telefilm Nanu Aur Main (2018), which revolves around the grandfather-granddaughter relationship. The telefilm received positive reviews from critics and the public, and she was praised for her performance. She next played second-lead roles in the dramas Teri Meri Kahani and Visaal, the latter of which is among the highest-rated Pakistani dramas of 2018.

== Personal life ==
Saboor along with her family performed Umrah in 2017, a few days before her mother's death. She moved to Karachi in 2011 to start her professional career, but moved back to Lahore in 2015. Her mother died of cancer in 2017. She married actor Ali Ansari at Parsi Institute in Karachi on 8 January 2022, and they have a daughter born in March 2025.

== Filmography ==
=== Films ===
Year	Title	Role	Director	Ref(s).
2016	Actor in Law	Annie Mirza	Nabeel Qureshi	

=== Television ===
Year	Title	Role	Notes	Ref(s).
2011	Mehmoodabad Ki Malkain	Rimsha		
2011	Choti Si Kahani	Sanara		
2012	Kitni Girhain Baqi Hain	Aimen	Episode: "Parde Mein Rehne Do"	
2013	Dil Awaiz	Riffat		
2013	Bunty I Love You	Mehwish	Negative Role	
2014	Meri Anaya	Anaya		
2014	Na Katro Pankh Mere	Anusha		
2015	Mr. Shamim	Rosie		
2015	Rang Laaga	Shumaila		
2015	Tere Dar Per	Anjuman		
2015	Bekasoor	Hira		
2016	Teri Chah Mein	Zara		
2016	Bhai	Wajiha		
2016	Waada	Jaana	Negative role	
2016	Aashiq Colony	Qamar-Un-Nisa	Telefilm	
2017	Kitni Girhain Baaki Hain (Season 2)	Sara	Episode: "Socha Na Tha"	
2017	Mubarak Ho Beti Hui Hai	Amber		
2017	Jallan	Aima		
2017	Meraas	Jia		
2018	Teri Meri Kahani	Sofia		
2018	Visaal	Naheed	Negative Role	
2018	Nanu Aur Main	Erum	Telefilm	
2018	Mere Khudaya	Mehak		
2018	Ishq Mein Kaafir	Ujala		
2019	Bhool	Ayesha		
2019	Gul-o-Gulzar	Gul	Negative Role	
2019	Naqab Zan	Dua		
2020	Tum Ho Wajah	Sitara		
2020	Haqeeqat	Aliya	Episode: "Mujrim Kon"	
2020	Fitrat	Fariya	Negative role	
2021	Mujhay Vida Kar	Sadia		
2021	Parizaad	Saima Aka Bubbly Badmash		
2021	Amanat	Zunera (Zuni)	Negative role	
2022	Nehar	Anmol		
2022	Mushkil	Sameen		
2023	Sar-e-Rah	Rameen		
2023	Jannat Se Aagay	Zara		
2024	Beyhadh	Areeba Iqbal (Jugnoo)	Negative Role	
2025	Doosra Chehra	Komal		
2025	Pehli Barish	Nimra		
2025	Faaslay	Ainy		

== Awards and nominations ==
Year	Award	Category	Work	Result	Ref(s).
2017	Lux Style Awards	Best Supporting Actress in a Film	Actor In Law	Nominated	
2021	Lux Style Awards	Best Television Actress (Viewers' Choice)	Fitrat	Won	
2022	Hum Awards	Best Supporting Actress	Parizaad	Won	
