= Humayun Saeed filmography =

Filmography of Humayun Saeed

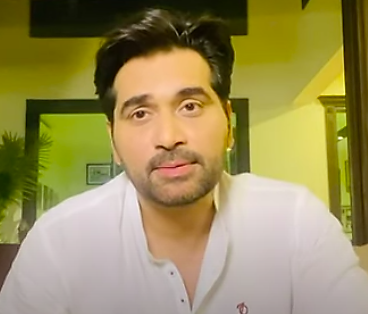
Humayun Saeed in 2020

Humayun Saeed is a Pakistani actor and producer. Saeed has appeared in Pakistani television dramas and films and earned Lux Style Awards and ARY Film Awards.

== Films ==
†	Denotes films that have not yet been released

- All films are in Urdu-language, unless otherwise noted.

Year	Film	Role(s)	Producer	Notes	Ref.
1999	Inteha	Zafar		Debut film; negative role	
2000	No Money No Problem	Shani			
2007	Mein Ek Din Laut Kay Aaoon Ga	Zoheb / Babar		Dual role	
2008	Khulay Aasman Ke Neechay	Nabeel			
2009	Jashnn	Aman Bajaj		Hindi debut film; negative role	
2011	Love Mein Ghum	Himself		Cameo appearance in the song "Love Mein Ghum"	
2013	Main Hoon Shahid Afridi	Coach Akbar	Yes	Also as co-producer	
2015	Bin Roye	Irtaza			
2015	Jawani Phir Nahi Ani	Sherry	Yes	Also co-producer; Won – Lux Style Award for Best Actor; Won – ARY Film Award for Best Actor	
2015	Manto	Himself		Cameo appearance	
2016	Actor in Law	Himself		Special appearance	
2016	Lala Begum			Released at film festivals	
2017	Yalghaar	Trojan		Negative role	
2017	Punjab Nahi Jaungi	Fawad Khagga	Yes	Also co-producer	
2018	Jawani Phir Nahi Ani 2	Sherry	Yes	Also co-producer	
2019	Project Ghazi	Salaar			
2019	Baaji	Himself		Cameo appearance	
2022	London Nahi Jaunga	Jameel	Yes	Also co-producer	
2023	Allahyar and the 100 Flowers of God	Sage		Voice-over role	
2025	Love Guru	Adil / Hamza Abbasi	Yes		

== Selected television series ==
=== Actor ===
Year	Title	Role	Network	Notes	Ref(s)
1996	Ilzam	Adil	Shalimar Television Network		
1997	Anhoni	Sheraz	Pakistan Television Corporation		
1997	Yeh Zindagi	Manzoor	Pakistan Television Corporation		
1997	Na Janay Kiya Hoga	Zaraq	Pakistan Television Corporation		
1997	Bechain	Junaid	Pakistan Television Corporation		
1997	Jaanay Anjanay	Mansoor	Pakistan Television Corporation		
1998	Dhoop Mein Sawan	Taimoor	Pakistan Television Corporation		
1999	Andheray Dareechay	Naeem	Shalimar Television Network		
1999	Kangan	Ahmar	PTV Home		
1999	Sooraj Girhan	Shoaib	PTV Home		
1999	Doosri Duniya	Nadir	PTV Home		
1999	Afsoon Khawab	Maqsood	PTV Home		
2000	Kabhi Kabhi Pyar Mein	Ahmar	PTV Home		
2000	Tum Hi To Ho	Aazir	PTV Home		
2000	Aur Zindagi Badalti Hai	Zain	PTV Home		
2001	The Castle: Aik Umeed	Arsil	PTV Home		
2002	Chaandni Raatain	Asim	PTV Home		
2003	Mehndi	Shahzaib	PTV Home		
2003	Umrao Jaan Ada	Faiz Ali	Geo Entertainment		
2004	Ana	Sanawar	Geo Entertainment		
2005	Riyasat	Ahmed Nawaz	ARY Digital		
2007	Wilco		PTV Home		
2008	Doraha	Umer	Geo Entertainment		
2009	Ishq Junoon Deewangi	Sahil Sher	Hum TV		
2009	Aashti	Abrash	Hum TV		
2009	Nadaaniyaan	Himself	Geo Entertainment	Guest appearance	
2009	Ishq Ki Inteha	Malik Farhad	Geo Entertainment		
2009	Meri Zaat Zarra-e-Benishan	Shuja	Geo Entertainment		
2010	Ijazat	Hamza	ARY Digital		
2010	Daam	Himself	ARY Digital	Guest appearance	
2010	Daddy	Sameer	ARY Digital	Supporting cast	
2010	Ishq Gumshuda	Ali	Hum TV		
2010	Yeh Zindagi Hai	Himself	Geo Entertainment	Guest appearance	
2010	Uraan	Dr. Faraz	Geo Entertainment		
2011	Ladies Park	Sarmad (Sarmi)	Geo Entertainment		
2011	Zip Bus Chup Raho	Uzair/Umair	Geo Entertainment		
2011	Tum Ho Ke Chup	Mir Zarrar Khan	Geo Entertainment		
2011	Mohabbat Rooth Jaye Toh	Shahnawaz	Hum TV		
2011	Kafir	Shahan Ali Khan	ARY Digital	Negative role	
2011	Neeyat	Sikandar	ARY Digital		
2011	Omar Dadi aur Gharwalay	Adil	ARY Digital		
2016	Dil Lagi	Mohid	ARY Digital		
2016	Bin Roye	Irtaza Muzaffar	Hum TV		
2019	Meray Paas Tum Ho	Danish Akhtar	ARY Digital		
2019	Ehd-e-Wafa	Humayun	Hum TV	Guest appearance	
2022	The Crown	Dr Hasnat Khan	Netflix	Recurring	
2024	Gentleman	Iqbal Munna	Green Entertainment		
2025	Main Manto Nahi Hoon	Zaviyar Manto	ARY Digital		

=== Producer (with Six Sigma Plus Productions) ===
Year	Title	Network
2004	Moorat	ARY Digital
2005	Riyasat	ARY Digital
2006	Manzil	ARY Digital
2006	Makan	Geo TV
2007	Sarkar Sahab	ARY Digital
2008	Doraha	Geo TV
2009	Meri Zaat Zarra-e-Benishan	Geo TV
2010	Daam	ARY Digital
2021	Mere Humsafar	ARY Digital
2023	Kuch Ankahi	ARY Digital
2025	Meri Zindagi Hai Tu	ARY Digital

== Selected telefilms ==
Year	Title	Role	Network
1996	Farar	Asad	Pakistan Television Corporation
1996	Ab Tum Ja Saktey Ho	Shaukat	Pakistan Television Corporation
1998	Ghazi Shaheed	Lieutenant Muhammad Bashir Rajput	Pakistan Television Corporation
1999	Peela Jora	Rameez	Pakistan Television Corporation
