= Choti Si Kahani =

2011 Pakistani TV series

- Also known as: A Little Story
- Genre: Drama; Romance
- Written by: Haseena Moin
- Directed by: Kamran Qureshi
- Starring: Nadia Hussain; Adnan Siddiqui; Ayesha Khan; Farhan Ali Agha; Sadia Imam; Shamoon Abbasi; Saboor Ali; Ali Afzal; Hassan Ahmed; Tehreem Zuberi; Durdana Butt; Rashid Farooqi; Noman Habib.
- Theme music composer: Farrukh Abid
- Opening theme: "Choti Si Kahani" by Sara Raza Khan
- Composer: Shoaib Farrukh
- Country of origin: Pakistan
- Original language: Urdu
- No. of episodes: 17

Production
- Executive producer: Satish Anand
- Producer: Raheel Uddin Faridi
- Production locations: Karachi, Pakistan
- Cinematography: Faizan Kamal
- Editors: Faheem Ahmed; Irfan Qasim
- Running time: 45 minutes

Original release
- Network: PTV
- Release: 2011

Choti Si Kahani (Urdu: چهوٹى سى كہانى, lit. 'A Tiny Tale') is a 2011 TV serial directed by Kamran Qureshi, written by Haseena Moin and produced by the production house Eveready Pictures.

The serial focuses on mistrust in marital life, discontinuation of girls' education due to early marriage and women's independence as wives. The drama shows the struggle in the life of three women.

== Plot ==
Khalida, Rushna and Mishal were school mates when, Munir Hussain, a foreign qualified but conservative son of a millionaire businessman develops a crush on Khalida and marries her by threatening her family. She gives birth to a daughter Sanara which disappoints Munir who already has two daughters from her first wife in the village.

Mishal, the daughter of a poor hoarding painter, who dreamt of becoming a supermodel, loved Ramish, a boy from family friends. Mishal joined modelling and Ramish left the country. Mishal is liked by a TV director Raheel. She encounters Ramish one day and finds that he is already married with two children but his wife died. They both start meeting again but Ramish's children disapprove her and Mishal then accepts Raheel's love.

Rushna became a top TV anchor. She married Ahmed who is an airline pilot and has a daughter Sawera. Their married life was ideal but an air hostess Nashmia, who likes Ahmed, comes in between.

Mishal's friend Rajal, a psychiatrist, one day meets Rushna with Mishal. He starts visiting Rushna's home, pretending to help her mentally in her married life crisis due to Nashmia. One day he expresses his love for Rushna. On hearing this Ahmed leaves home taking his daughter Sawera. Rushna insults Rajal and breaks her relations with him.

Ahmed decides to marry Nashmia but first wants his daughter to become familiar with Nashmia but both cannot accept each other. Ahmed is disappointed of Nashmia's behaviour and returns to Rushna who accepts him back as both admit their mistakes.

Khalida's mother, Amma Bi, comes to live with them after Munir's murder. Now there is no one to run the business as Khalida was a housewife and has no experience or education after school. She comes across Asif, the owner of neighbouring mill who liked her from first sight. Her textile mill needs material and she pawns her property. Unknown to Khlida, her Mill manager attains the fund from Asif.

Sanara is studying in Art College and admires her talented class fellow Sarim who belongs to a middle-class family. Sarim helps Khalida in designing textile for the mill and is given a job at the mill. Khalida learns that Sarim and Sanara love each other. Sanara is then engaged to Sarim. Khalida's mill starts doing good business and Asif gifts her the papers of her property which shocks her but she is happy.

== Cast ==
=== Main cast ===
- Nadia Hussain as Mishal Wasif
- Adnan Siddiqui as Ahmed
- Ayesha Khan as Rushna
- Sadia Imam as Khalida
- Farhan Ali Agha as Rajal
- Shamoon Abbasi as Ramish
- Saboor Ali as Sanara
- Noman Habib as Sarim

=== Supporting cast ===
- Ali Afzal as Asif Sahab
- Rashid Farooqui as Muneer Hussain
- Hassan Ahmed as Raheel
- Tehreem Zuberi as Nashmia
- Durdana Butt as Amma Bi
- M. Ayub as Ramo Kaka
- Ushna as Sawera
- Naeem Shaikh as Baqar Sahab
- Nighat Sultana as Shabbo

== Soundtrack ==
The theme songs was sung by Sara Raza Khan, composed by Farrukh Abid and lyricists was Sabir Zafar.

External videos
- A promotional video of Choti Si Kahani

== Awards and nominations ==
THE 3RD PAKISTAN MEDIA AWARDS

- Nominated - Best TV Serial (2012)
- Nominated - Best TV Drama OST (2012)
- Nominated - Best TV Writer (2012) - Haseena Moin
- Nominated - Best TV Director (2012) - Kamran Qureshi
- Nominated - Best TV Producer (2012) - Raheel Uddin Fareedi
- Nominated - Best TV Actress in a supporting role (2012) - Sadia Imam

== See also ==
- Moorat
- Riyasat
- Makan
- Manzil
- Sarkar Sahab
- Ishq Ki Inteha
- Nestlé Nido Young Stars
