= Makan (TV series) =

- Poster
- Also known as: Home a Heaven
- Genre: Drama; Romance
- Written by: Bushra Ansari
- Directed by: Kamran Qureshi
- Starring: Fahad Mustafa; Sara Loren; Saleem Sheikh; Shagufta Ejaz; Khayyam Sarhadi; Shabbir Jan; Ayesha Sana; Shahood Alvi; Maira Khan & Bushra Ansari
- Theme music composer: Waqar Ali
- Opening theme: "Rog Jog" by Shafqat Amanat Ali
- Country of origin: Pakistan
- Original language: Urdu
- No. of episodes: 20

Production
- Producers: Humayun Saeed, Abdullah Kadwani and Salman Nanitalwala
- Production locations: Karachi, Pakistan
- Cinematography: Syed Naeem Rizvi; Aijaz Shamsi
- Editors: Adnan Wai Qureshi; Imran Wai Qureshi
- Running time: 45 minutes
- Production company: 7th Sky Entertainment

Original release
- Network: Geo TV; Star Plus Russia
- Release: 30 June 2006 – 2006

Makan (Urdu: مكان; English: Home a Heaven) is a 2006 Pakistani TV drama series, which was broadcast on Geo TV. The serial is directed by Kamran Qureshi, written by Bushra Ansari and produced by Humayun Saeed and Abdullah Kadwani's production house 7th Sky Entertainment. The story is based on extramarital affairs, and reflects on the dignity of family relations.

The show was also aired on Star Plus Russia.

== Plot ==
The story revolves around a rich family of two brothers Nawaz (Khayyam Sarhadi) and Shehbaz (Shabbir Jan) who own a cinema house. Nawaz is married to a rich lady known in the household as Bhabi G or Tayee G (Bushra Ansari) who is dominant and lords over the whole family. Shehbaz is married to a typical eastern woman Mehru (Shagufta Ejaz) who is very obedient of her husband and in-laws.

Nawaz has two children, Zahra (Ayesha Sana) and Akbar (Shahood Alvi). Naheed (Maira Khan) who loves Akbar, commits suicide after his mother Bhabi G does not let Akbar and Naheed marry.

Shehbaz often snubs his own wife and their three children, Jaffer (Saleem Sheikh), Gulfam (Fahad Mustafa) and Seema (Saira Khan) because of Bhabi G whose word he always follows whether it's a right decision or wrong.

Shehbaz hides his divorce from his family and has been living with his wife for twelve years. Nawaz's wife (Bhabi G) had relationships outside of marriage with her brother in-law Shehbaz.

Jaffer gets a job in a bank and moves to his new house provided by the bank. He helps Saima (Naheed Shabbir) from ex-husband's blackmailing and later marries her.

Zahra has two kids from her husband Azam (Kaiser Khan Nizamani) but not getting enough attention from him, she is having affair with her friend's husband Shahid (Jahanzeb Gurchani).

Ghulfam marries film actress Nazli (Sara Loren) and takes power of attorney for all property from Bhabi G by doing fraud and transfers all property papers in his wife's name. Nazli and his malicious father take over all the business from Nawaz, who can't absorb the shock and dies of a heart attack. Bhabi G gets paralyzed by pushing her down the stairs by Nazli and his father. Later Nazli's father gets arrested for his involvement in the murder of Bhabi G's only son Akbar (Shahood Alvi).

== Cast ==
=== Main cast ===
- Sara Loren as Nazli
- Fahad Mustafa as Gulfam
- Bushra Ansari as Tayee G
- Saleem Sheikh as Jaffer
- Shagufta Ejaz as Mehru
- Khayyam Sarhadi as Nawaz Ali
- Shabbir Jan as Shahbaz Ali
- Ayesha Sana as Zahra
- Shahood Alvi as Akbar
- Saira Khan as Seema

=== Recurring cast ===
- Maira Khan as Naheed
- Rashid Farooqi as Faizan
- Jahanzeb Gurchani as Shahid
- Kaiser Khan Nizamani as Azam
- Naheed Shabbir as Saima
- Adnan Jilani as Anees
- Ehtasham Warsi as Nazli's Dad
- Mubasshir Abbas as Dilawar
- Parveen Akbar as Saima's Mum
- Tasneem Ansari as Akbar's Professor
- Aiman as Sumbul
- Rehana Akhtar as Naheed's Mum
- Gaysoo as Pino
- Imtiaz Taj as Journalist
- Ayaz Khan as TV Director
- Adnan Shah as Jaffer's Friend

== Soundtrack ==
External videos
- A promotional video of Makan

The theme song Rog Jog was composed by Waqar Ali and sung by Shafqat Amanat Ali. Lyricist was M Nasir and music video was released in 2006.

== Production ==
The serial was shot in 2004 approximately but was broadcast after two years.

== Awards and nominations ==
6th Lux Style Awards

- Nominated - Best TV Director (Satellite) (2007) - Kamran Qureshi.

== See also ==
- Moorat
- Riyasat
- Manzil
- Sarkar Sahab
- Ishq Ki Inteha
- Choti Si Kahani
