= Iram Qureshi =

British Film Director

- Other name: Iram Kamran Qureshi
- Occupations: Film & TV Producer, Director, and Media Academic
- Years active: 2000–present
- Spouse: Kamran Qureshi (m. 2002-present)

Academic background
- Education: Brunel University London
- Thesis: The Stranger Left No Card: A Critical Analysis of Wendy Toye’s work as a Woman Director in British Cinema and Television. (2020)
- Academic advisors: Paul Moody and Leon Hunt

Iram Qureshi is a British film and TV producer, director and media academic. She is the recipient of 1st Indus Drama Awards and PTV Awards. Iram has also been an Assistant Examiner at the University of Cambridge since 2011 and a Senior Lecturer at the Ravensbourne University, London.

== Education ==
Qureshi did her television production internship, a part of her MSc in Communication Sciences at Combine media in 2000.

== Career ==
She is the founder of KQ Movies, a London-based film production company and the MD of Evergreen Productions. Apart from her career as a film and television producer, she has also been an assistant examiner at the University of Cambridge since 2011. Her PhD in Film and Television titled, The Stranger Left No Card: A Critical Analysis of Wendy Toye's work as a Woman Director in British Cinema and Television, was archival research and the first sustained analysis of a pioneering woman director from 1950s British cinema, at Brunel University London. Currently, she is working on a WWI period drama The Woman with the Torch - Elsie Inglis' War on the life of Elsie Maud Inglis, the founder of Scottish Women's Hospitals for Foreign Service.

== Filmography ==
Name	Role	Type	Ref.
Only Love Matters	Producer & Associate Director	Feature film	
Beyond the Silence of the Sea	Director & producer	TV documentary	
Ishq Ki Inteha	Director	TV series	
Nestlé Nesvita Women of Strength '09	Director	TV talk show	
Nestlé Nido Young Stars	Director	TV talk show	
Sarkar Sahab	Director	TV series	
Manzil	Co-director	TV series	
Maa Aur Mamta	Producer	TV series	
Moorat	Associate director	TV series	
Murad (film)	Associate producer	TV film	
Ariel Mothers	Producer	TV Talk Show	
Riyasat	Co-director	TV series	
Meharun Nisa	Producer	TV series	

== Awards ==
Year	Award	Category	Nominated work	Role	Result	Ref.
2005	1st Indus Drama Awards	Best Producer Series	Maa Aur Mamta (Motherhood)	Producer	Won	
2003	Indus Telefilm Festival	Best TV Film	Murad	Producer	Won	
2002	PTV Awards	Best Talk Show Award	Ariel Mothers	Producer	Won	

== Academic theses ==
- Qureshi, Iram Kamran (2020). The stranger left no card: a critical analysis of Wendy Toye's work as a woman director in British cinema and television. OCLC 1203044451.
