= List of programs broadcast by ARY Digital =

Programs broadcast by ARY Digital

This is a list of notable original programs broadcast by ARY Digital (Urdu: ARY ڈیجیٹل), a Pakistani television network.

The channel line-up includes dramas, sitcoms, comedy, feature films, teleplay, educational shows, series, game shows and talk shows. The channel also broadcast religious shows on Islamic occasions.

== Current programming ==
=== Comedy and Sitcom ===
Year	Show	Ref
2019–present	Bulbulay Season 2	

=== Reality and Special shows ===
Year	Show	Ref
2013–present	Shan e Ramazan	
2014–present	Jeeto Pakistan	

== Former programing ==
=== Anthologies ===
Name	First aired	Last aired
Kahani Aik Raat Ki	24 February 2012	9 January 2013

=== Comedy and Sitcoms ===
Year	Name	First aired	Last aired	Ref
2005-14	Rubber Band	2005	2014	
2009-17	Bulbulay Season 1	22 October 2009	2 July 2017	
2011-15	Dugdugi	9 July 2011	1 September 2015	
2012-14	Quddusi Sahab Ki Bewah	12 February 2012	25 June 2014	
2012-13	Timmy G	2 June 2012	11 January 2013	
2013-14	Meri Teri Kahani	2013	2014	
2021	Shehnai	18 March 2021	15 August 2021	

=== Prime time series ===
Year	Name	First aired	Last aired	Ref
2004-05	Moorat	2 August 2004	15 March 2005	
2005	Riyasat	2005	2005	
2006	Manzil	2006	2006	
2007	Kaisa Yeh Junoon	2007	2007	
2007	Sarkar Sahab	2007	2007	
2009	Lamha Lamha Zindagi	2009	2009	
2009	Veena	2009	2009	
2010	Diya Jalay	4 January 2010	17 May 2010	
2010	Ijazat	6 May 2010	23 September 2010	
2010	Daam	11 June 2010	15 October 2010	
2010	Omer Dadi Aur Gharwale	2010	2010	
2010-11	Daddy	13 November 2010	5 February 2011	
2010-11	Mera Saaein	21 November 2010	22 May 2011	
2011	Zindagi Dhoop Tum Ghana Saya	19 February 2011	17 June 2011	
2011	Roag	11 April 2011	27 August 2011	
2011	Umm-e-Kulsoom	29 May 2011	23 October 2011	
2011	Neeyat	24 June 2011	21 November 2011	
2011	Main Chand Si	2011	2011	
2011-12	Kuch Pyar Ka Pagalpan	23 September 2011	10 March 2012	
2012	Mera Saaein 2	15 April 2012	7 October 2012	
2012	Meri Ladli	5 May 2012	18 August 2012	
2012	Thakan	10 May 2012	11 October 2012	
2012	Khushi Ek Roag	11 June 2012	2012	
2012	Baandi	2012	2012	
2012	Kaafir	2012	2012	
2012	Mera Yaqeen	2012	2012	
2012-13	Aks	29 August 2012	6 February 2013	
2012-13	Mera Pehla Pyaar	20 October 2012	16 March 2013	
2012-13	Tanhaiyan Naye Silsilay	20 October 2012	19 January 2013	
2013	Kaash Aisa Ho	January 2013	2013	
2013-14	Darmiyaan	14 August 2013	4 January 2014	
2013-14	Kabhi Kabhi	20 September 2013	2014	
2013-14	Meri Beti	9 October 2013	2 April 2014	
2013-14	Pyarey Afzal	26 November 2013	12 August 2014	
2014	Shikwa	3 May 2014	8 November 2014	
2014	Shukk	4 August 2014	21 September 2014	
2014-15	Chup Raho	19 August 2014	10 March 2015	
2014-15	Daagh	19 August 2014	10 March 2015	
2014-15	Mein Bushra	11 September 2014	15 February 2015	
2014-15	Parvarish	23 September 2014	17 March 2015	
2014-15	Goya	15 November 2014	17 April 2015	
2014-15	Doosri Biwi	1 December 2014	4 May 2015	
2015	Ishq Parast	19 February 2015	23 July 2015	
2015	Rang Laaga	11 March 2015	4 November 2015	
2015	Zinda Dargor	11 May 2015	2 November 2015	
2015	Guzaarish	2015	2015	
2015-16	Mere Ajnabi	29 July 2015	20 January 2016	
2015-16	Bay Qasoor	11 November 2015	1 June 2016	
2016	Ab Kar Meri Rafugari	28 January 2016	14 July 2016	
2016	Mera Yaar Miladay	8 February 2016	4 July 2016	
2016	Dil Lagi	5 March 2016	10 September 2016	
2016	Besharam	10 May 2016	1 November 2016	
2016	Naimat	11 July 2016	26 December 2016	
2016	Aap Ke Liye	12 July 2016	2016	
2016-17	Khuda Mera Bhi Hai	22 October 2016	10 April 2017	
2016-17	Waada	8 November 2016	12 April 2017	
2016-17	Bay Khudi	17 November 2016	4 May 2017	
2016-17	Yeh Ishq	30 November 2016	19 April 2017	
2016-17	Muqabil	6 December 2016	23 May 2017	
2017	Sun Yaara	2 January 2017	17 July 2017	
2017	Rasm E Duniya	16 February 2017	28 August 2017	
2017	Shiza	11 March 2017	25 November 2017	
2017	Iltija	8 April 2017	4 November 2017	
2017	Mubarak Ho Beti Hui Hai	19 April 2017	1 September 2017	
2017	Zaakham	6 May 2017	31 August 2017	
2017	Aitraaz	27 May 2017	20 December 2017	
2017	Ghairat	14 July 2017	13 November 2017	
2017	Khilona	2017	2017	
2017	Mere Hamrahi	2017	2017	
2017	Paiwand	2017	2017	
2017-18	Teri Raza	8 July 2017	1 February 2018	
2017-18	Badnaam	8 August 2017	4 March 2018	
2017-18	Aisi Hai Tanhai	8 November 2017	21 March 2018	
2017-18	Aangan	18 November 2017	12 July 2018	
2017-18	Qurban	20 November 2017	19 March 2018	
2018	Nibah	4 January 2018	20 June 2018	
2018	Pukaar	8 February 2018	12 July 2018	
2018	Noor ul Ain	10 February 2018	3 July 2018	
2018	Woh Mera Dil Tha	17 March 2018	5 October 2018	
2018	Bay Dardi	26 March 2018	27 August 2018	
2018	Visaal	28 March 2018	22 September 2018	
2018	Lashkara	3 April 2018	28 October 2018	
2018	Khasara	10 April 2018	21 August 2018	
2018	Mere Khudaya	23 June 2018	15 December 2018	
2018	Meri Guriya	27 June 2018	3 October 2018	
2018	Dil Mom Ka Diya	28 August 2018	4 December 2018	
2018-19	Babban Khala Ki Betiyann	21 June 2018	8 June 2019	
2018-19	Koi Chand Rakh	19 July 2018	14 February 2019	
2018-19	Balaa	3 September 2018	14 January 2019	
2018-19	Khudparast	6 October 2018	23 March 2019	
2018-19	Haiwaan	10 October 2018	2 January 2019	
2018-19	Beti	11 December 2018	26 February 2019	
2019	Cheekh	5 January 2019	10 August 2019	
2019	Kaisa Hai Naseeban	9 January 2019	3 April 2019	
2019	Hania	21 February 2019	31 August 2019	
2019	Do Bol	5 March 2019	5 May 2019	
2019	Hasad	10 June 2019	2 September 2019	
2019	Bhool	12 June 2019	16 October 2019	
2019	Surkh Chandni	12 June 2019	24 September 2019	
2019	Gul-o-Gulzar	13 June 2019	12 December 2019	
2019-20	Meray Paas Tum Ho	17 August 2019	25 January 2020	
2019-20	Bewafa	16 September 2019	5 March 2020	
2019-20	Ruswai	1 October 2019	14 April 2020	
2019-20	Thora Sa Haq	23 October 2019	10 June 2020	
2019-20	Damsa	29 November 2019	29 January 2020	
2019-20	Ghalati	19 December 2019	4 June 2020	
2020	Jhooti	1 February 2020	25 July 2020	
2020	Ishqiya	3 February 2020	10 August 2020	
2020	Bikhray Moti	26 May 2020	10 November 2020	
2020	Dushman-e-Jaan	1 June 2020	16 July 2020	
2020	Jalan	17 June 2020	16 December 2020	
2020-21	Log Kya Kahenge	25 July 2020	11 March 2021	
2020-21	Ghisi Piti Mohabbat	6 August 2020	21 January 2021	
2020-21	Prem Gali	17 August 2020	22 March 2021	
2020-21	Dunk	23 December 2020	7 August 2021	
2021	Pehli Si Muhabbat	23 January 2021	9 October 2021	
2021	Pardes	17 May 2021	13 September 2021	
2021	Ishq Hai	15 June 2021	14 September 2021	
2021-22	Berukhi	15 September 2021	23 March 2022	
2021-22	Amanat	21 September 2021	26 April 2022	
2021-22	Sinf-e-Aahan	27 November 2021	7 May 2022	
2021-22	Mere Humsafar	30 December 2021	29 September 2022	
2022	Yeh Na Thi Hamari Qismat	24 January 2022	17 March 2022	
2022	Pyar Deewangi Hai	9 May 2022	5 December 2022	
2022	Habs	10 May 2022	20 December 2022	
2022	Kaisi Teri Khudgarzi	11 May 2022	14 December 2022	
2022	Fraud	14 May 2022	31 December 2022	
2022-23	Pinjra	6 October 2022	6 April 2023	
2022-23	Mujhe Pyaar Hua Tha	12 December 2022	31 July 2023	
2022-23	Teri Bina Mein Nahi	27 December 2022	22 August 2023	
2023	Kuch Ankahi	7 January 2023	15 July 2023	
2023	Jaisay Aapki Marzi	23 August 2023	26 December 2023	
2023	Dhoka	7 November 2023	22 December 2023	
2023-24	Tere Ishq Ke Naam	27 April 2023	12 October 2024	
2023-24	Mein	7 August 2023	5 February 2024	
2023-24	Sukoon	13 October 2023	28 March 2024	
2023-24	Jaan-e-Jahan	22 December 2023	24 May 2024	
2024	Burns Road Kay Romeo Juliet	6 February 2024	1 July 2024	
2024	Radd	10 April 2024	15 August 2024	
2024	Noor Jahan	25 May 2024	14 September 2024	
2024	Kabhi Main Kabhi Tum	2 July 2024	4 November 2024	
2024	Bismil	21 August 2024	25 December 2024	
2024-25	Ghair	20 September 2024	18 January 2025	
2024-25	Aye Ishq e Junoon	11 November 2024	10 March 2025	
2025	Naqaab	23 February 2025	18 May 2025	

=== Daily series ===
Year	Name	First aired	Last aired	Ref
2006-07	Piya Kay Ghar Jana Hai	2006	2007	
2007-08	Khwaish	16 July 2007	24 April 2008	
2011-12	Mehmoodabad Ki Malkain	27 February 2011	1 October 2012	
2011-12	Dareecha	12 September 2011	13 March 2012	
2011-13	Khushboo Ka Ghar	2011	2013	
2012	Meri Behan Meri Dewrani	1 May 2012	2012	
2016-17	Mein Mehru Hoon	11 July 2016	28 September 2017	
2020	Mera Dil Mera Dushman	3 February 2020	23 September 2020	
2020-21	Nand	4 August 2020	13 April 2021	
2020-21	Bharaas	28 September 2020	4 February 2021	
2020-21	Faryaad	4 December 2020	9 April 2021	
2021	Samjhota	16 January 2021	4 May 2021	
2021	Azmaish	19 May 2021	17 September 2021	
2021	Mujhay Vida Kar	17 May 2021	3 August 2021	
2021-22	Benaam	2 November 2021	2 January 2022	
2022	Teri Rah Mein	3 January 2022	6 March 2022	
2022	Angna	7 March 2022	6 June 2022	
2022	Aik Sitam Aur	21 March 2022	26 July 2022	
2022	Woh Pagal Si	27 July 2022	7 October 2022	
2022	Betiyaan	8 October 2022	17 December 2022	
2022-23	Taqdeer	10 October 2022	12 January 2023	
2022-23	Muqaddar Ka Sitara	19 December 2022	18 February 2023	
2023	Baby Baji	23 May 2023	1 August 2023	
2023	Mayi Ri	2 August 2023	7 October 2023	
2023	Ehsaan Faramosh	8 August 2023	6 November 2023	
2023	Dhoka	7 November 2023	22 December 2023	
2023-24	Adawat	12 December 2023	12 February 2024	
2023-24	Tera Waada	25 December 2023	11 March 2024	
2024	Tum Bin Kesay Jiyen	13 February 2024	2 May 2024	
2024	Khudsar	15 April 2024	29 July 2024	
2024	Hasrat	3 May 2024	5 July 2024	
2024	Tark e Wafa	6 July 2024	22 September 2024	
2024	Dil Hi Tou Hai	8 October 2024	11 December 2024	
2024-25	Bharam	27 November 2024	28 February 2025	
2024-25	Aapa Shameem	7 December 2024	22 February 2025	

=== Horror and Supernatural series ===
Name	First aired	Last aired
Bandish	21 January 2019	16 December 2023
Neeli Zinda Hai	20 May 2021	23 December 2021
Sannata	3 October 2013	17 April 2014

=== Miniseries ===
Name	First aired	Last aired
Aakhri Station	13 February 2018	27 March 2018
Sar-e-Rah	4 February 2023	11 March 2023

=== Telefilms ===
Year	Name	Ref
2019	Aik Say Barh Kar Aik	
2019	Apni Apni Love Story	
2019	Help Me Durdana	
2021	1970 A True Love Story	
2021	Absolutely Knot	
2021	Aik Hai Nigar	
2021	Hangor S-131	
2021	Pyar Ki Love Story	
2021	Uff Yeh Biwiyaan	
2021	Wedding Virus	
2022	Aunty Allergy	
2022	Bhoot Bakra	
2022	Chand Raat Aur Chandini	
2022	Chand Si Dulhan	
2022	Dream Villa Ki Confused Love Story	
2022	Siwaiyaan	
2023	Daku Bangaya Gentleman	
2023	I Love You Zara	
2023	Mummy Nahi Maanain Gi	
2024	Achari Mohabbat	
2024	Ijazat	

=== Reality shows ===
Year	Name	First aired	Last aired	Ref
2002-04	Kya Aap Banaingay Crorepati?	2002	2004	
2006	Survivor Pakistan	August 2006	November 2006	
2013-14	Coke Studio (Pakistan)	2013	2014	
2013-18	Madventures	22 February 2013	2 March 2018	
2014	Kuch Kar Dikha	18 February 2014	28 February 2014	
2015-16	Pantene Shine Princess	2015	2016	
2015-18	Battle of the Bands	2015	2018	
2021	ARY Celebrity League	31 January 2021	11 April 2021	
2022-23	The Ultimate Muqabla Season 1	15 October 2022	7 January 2023	
2022-24	Tamasha	20 August 2022	5 October 2024	
2023	The Ultimate Muqabla Season 2	7 October 2023	30 December 2023	
2024-25	The Ultimate Muqabla Season 3	12 October 2024	11 January 2025	

=== Talk shows ===
Name	First aired	Last aired
Sajid's Superstars	26 July 2008	October 2008

=== Awards shows ===
Name	Ref
Apsara Awards	
ARY Film Awards	
ARY People's Choice Awards	
IIFA Awards	
LUX Style Awards	
Stardust Awards	
Veet Celebration of Beauty	
Zee Cine Awards	

== See also ==
- List of programs broadcast by Hum TV
- List of programs broadcast by Geo Entertainment
