= Maryam Fatima =

Pakistani model and actress

- مریم فاطمہ
- Born: 2 June 1997 (age 28); Karachi, Pakistan
- Occupations: Model, Actress
- Years active: 2016 – present
- Spouse: Haris Waheed (m. 2017)

Maryam Fatima (Urdu: مریم فاطمہ) is a Pakistani model and television actress. She made her acting debut in January 2016 with a leading role in the highly acclaimed Hum TV drama serial Lagao alongside Zainab Qayyum and Adnan Jaffar. She has played the lead role of Ujala in ARY Digital's series Kab Mere Kehlaoge.

She also appeared in Hum TV's award-winning drama serial Udaari which is a co-production of Momina Duraid Productions and Kashf Foundation. She played a vocalist with Farhan Saeed, singing for the Udaari OST before Urwa Hocane's character took over from her in the band.

== Filmography ==
=== Television ===
Year	Drama	Role	Network
2016	Lagao	Maham	Hum TV
2016	Zara Yaad Kar	Anushay	Hum TV
2016	Udaari	Farwa	Hum TV
2017	Saanp Seerhi		Express Entertainment
2017	Aashna	Erum	Play Entertainment
2017	Tumhari Marium	Ifsa	Hum TV
2017–2018	Kab Mere Kehlaoge	Ujala	ARY Digital
2019–2020	Mera Qasoor	Maheen	ARY Digital
2020	Dikhawa		Geo Entertainment
2020	Mera Maan Rakhna	Muqaddus	TV One
2021	Chakrees		TV One
2023	Dhoka	Hira	ARY Digital

=== Modeling ===
==== TV commercials ====
- Golden Sun KKC
- Nesfruta
