= Inteha =

Inteha may refer to:

- Inteha (1984 film), a 1984 Indian Hindi-language film by Shibu Mitra, starring Raj Babbar and Reena Roy
- Inteha (1988 film), a Pakistani film
- Inteha (1999 film), a Pakistani film
- Inteha (2003 film), a 2003 Indian Hindi-language thriller film by Vikram Bhatt, starring Ashmit Patel, Vidya Malvade and Nauheed Cyrusi

== See also ==
- Inteha Pyar Ki, a 1992 Indian Hindi-language romantic-drama film by J. K. Bihari, starring Rishi Kapoor
- Ishq Ki Inteha, a TV serial directed by Kamran Qureshi & Iram Qureshi
