= Tu Mera Junoon =

Pakistani television series

- Written by: Shabnam Sani
- Directed by: Sami Sani
- Starring: Kinza Hashmi; Noor Hassan Rizvi; Sana Fakhar; Asad Siddiqui
- Country of origin: Pakistan
- Original language: Urdu
- No. of episodes: 58

Production
- Executive producers: Abdullah Kadwani and Asad Qureshi
- Camera setup: Multi-camera setup
- Running time: approximately 40 minutes
- Production company: Blue Eye Entertainment

Original release
- Network: Geo Entertainment
- Release: 25 November 2019 – 13 February 2020

Tu Mera Junoon is a 2019 Pakistani television soap opera, produced by Blue Eye Entertainment. It has Kinza Hashmi, Noor Hassan Rizvi, Sana Fakhar and Asad Siddiqui in the lead roles. It aired on weekdays (Monday to Friday) on Geo Entertainment.

== Cast ==
- Kinza Hashmi as Hayat
- Sana Fakhar as Roshan
- Asad Siddiqui as Taimoor
- Noor Hassan Rizvi as Salaar
- Zainab Qayyum as Hayat's mother
- Farah Nadir as Parveen
- Beena Chaudhary as Roshan's mother
- Rashid Farooqui
