= Ijazat (TV series) =

2010 Pakistani television series

- Original title: اجازت
- Written by: Seema Ghazal
- Directed by: Misbah Khalid
- Starring: Humayun Saeed; Ayesha Khan; Sadia Imam
- Country of origin: Pakistan
- Original language: Urdu
- No. of episodes: 21

Production
- Producers: Samina Humayun Saeed; Shehzad Naseeb
- Production company: Six Sigma Plus

Original release
- Network: ARY Digital
- Release: 6 May – 23 September 2010

Ijazat (transl. Permission) is a Pakistani television series that premiered on ARY Digital on 6 May 2010. It is produced by Samina Humayun Saeed and Shehzad Naseeb under banner Six Sigma Plus and directed by Misbah Khalid. Humayun Saeed and Ayesha Khan played the lead roles in the series.

In an interview with Mag The Weekly, Saeed hinted about a potential sequel of the serial.

== Plot ==
The story revolves around a happily married couple, Hamza and Muqadas. Muqadas is a loving wife and daughter-in-law. Her husband Hamza who is a struggling actor also loves her. Hamaz's life changes when he encounters a woman, Nijaat, who is eager to join the showbiz industry. She is married to a simple looking yet wealthy man. After an extramarital affair with Hamza, she divorces her husband and marries him. At the end, Muqadas also divorces Hamaz and he is left alone with his guilt.

== Cast ==
- Humayun Saeed as Hamza
- Ayesha Khan as Muqaddas
- Sadia Imam as Nijaat
- Sakina Samo
- Rashid Farooqui as Kazim
- Qaiser Naqvi as Safiya
- Akbar Subhani
- Hassan Niazi as Zahid
- Munawar Saeed as Ishtiaq (Episodes 1, 2)
- Imran Aslam as Khurram

== Accolades ==
| Year | Award | Category | Recipient(s)/ nominee(s) | Result | Ref. |
|---|---|---|---|---|---|
| 2011 | Lux Style Awards | Best Television Play - Satellite | Ijazat | Nominated | |
