= Ariel Mothers =

- Also known as: Ariel Maa
- Genre: Talk Show
- Written by: Sania Saeed
- Directed by: Kamran Qureshi
- Presented by: Sania Saeed
- Theme music composer: Farrukh Abid
- Country of origin: Pakistan
- No. of seasons: 1
- No. of episodes: 104

Production
- Executive producer: Shagufta Yousuf
- Producer: Iram Qureshi
- Cinematography: Azhar Hussain; Zaeem Siddiqui; Kamran Qureshi
- Editor: Imran Wai Qureshi
- Running time: 22 minutes
- Production company: Evergreen Media Europe

Original release
- Release: 2000 – 2002

Ariel Maa (translation: "Ariel Mother") is a television talk show and travel program hosted by Sania Saeed and directed by Kamran Qureshi. The show was sponsored by Procter & Gamble. The Ariel team also did a social welfare service by presenting cheques to deserving mothers struggling to provide for their children.

The programme was telecast every Saturday on PTV between 2000–2002.

== Overview ==
The program focused on the efforts of mothers in Pakistan in raising their children. The program showed hundreds of mothers nurturing their children, across different classes, families and religions.

Episodes featured mothers making every effort to either save the life of an ailing son or daughter or trying to counter the financial problems to secure a good future for their children. It also highlighted in cases how men were deficient in regards to the responsibility of sharing the burden of raising a child with their wives.

The show featured multiple outdoor segments. At first, the writer Sania Saeed traveled through different areas of Pakistan, visiting her mother in the final episode. In another segment, the host discussed culture and history of the village of the week, standing next to a landmark and then meeting that city's mothers on their doorsteps. In the last segment, during interviews on set, members of the cast gave their experiences with their mothers.

== Production ==
The programme was originally meant to be set in Lahore, however after the departure of Raheel Rao, who was originally meant to direct the programme, the programme was later shifted to Karachi when Kamran Qureshi replaced Rao.

A recruiting company was hired to go around cities and villages looking for cases of mothers who have faced hardship or sacrifices for their children.

== Cast ==
- Salman Ahmad
- Ali Haider
- Marina Khan
- Anwar Maqsood
- Mahmood Ali
- Imran Aslam
- Ali Azmat
- Fatima Surayya Bajia
- Shagufta Ejaz
- Sajid Hasan
- Noman Ijaz
- Shabbir Jan
- Latif Kapadia
- Ardeshir Cowasjee
- Yasir Nawaz
- Arjumand Rahim
- Afshan Ahmed
- Behroze Sabzwari
- Tina Sani
- Jamal Shah
- Shafi Muhammad Shah
- Adnan Siddiqui
- Nida Yasir
- Sajjad Ali
- Jamshed Ansari
- Talat Hussain
- Savera Nadeem
- Humayun Saeed
- Sultana Siddiqui

== Soundtrack ==
External videos
- A promotional song of Ariel Mothers

The theme song, Maa Jaise Hasti (English: Dear Mother...) was sung by Khalid Waheed, composed by Farrukh Abid and written by Mujeeb Syed.

== Award ==
Ariel Mothers (Maa) won the National PTV Award in 2002 for the best programme in private productions.

== See also ==
- Nestlé Nido Young Stars
