= Madiha Iftikhar =

Pakistani actress and model

Madiha Iftikhar (Urdu: مدیحہ افتخار) (born on 5 February 1985) is a Pakistani TV drama actress and model.

== Early life ==
Madiha Iftikhar was born to Iftikhar Ahmed and Rehana Iftikhar, in Islamabad, Pakistan. Her parents used to do a show 'Boltey Haath' (speaking hands) which was based on sign language for deaf and mute special people. The show was aired on weekends on PTV in the 1990s.

== Career ==
Madiha Iftikhar began her acting career, at the age of 17 years, in Partition Aik Safar, one of the most expensive TV dramas ever produced in Pakistan.

She is currently the Brand Ambassador for Olivia Whitening Creme and has appeared in its advertisement campaigns since February 2011.

== Television ==
Year	Title	Role	Ref(s)
2002	Partition Aik Safar		
2007	Sarkar Sahab	Zena	
2007	Kaisa Yeh Junoon		
2009	Saiqa		
2009	Tujh Pe Qurban		
2009	Andata		
2009	Mujhe Apna Bana Lo		
2009	Aashti	Aqeela	
2009	Ishq Ki Inteha	Romana	
2009	Sotayli		
2009-2010	Dil, Dard, Dhuan		
2011	Khwaab Aankhein Khwahish Chehray		
2011	Neelam		
2011-2012	Sapnon Ki Oat Main		
2012	Meri Behan Meri Dewrani		
2012	Jhoomer		
2012	Mann Se Poocho		
2013	Jaan Hatheli Par		
2014	Chor Darwazay		
2014-2015	Koi Deepak Ho		
2016-2018	Funkari		
2017-2018	Mera Haq	Sara	
2021	Meri Dilli Wali Girlfriend		
2022	Meri Guriya	Samina	
2023	Chand Tara	Mehnaaz	
2024	Baby Baji Ki Bahuein	Saira	
2024-2025	Ghair	Tehreem	

== Personal life ==
Iftikhar resides in Karachi and is married.

== TV morning show host ==
Madiha Iftikhar hosted the Raunaq-e-Ramadan transmission on Dawn News TV channel in 2012.
