= Riyasat Mae Riyasat =

- Written by: Mashood Qadri
- Directed by: Asad Malik
- Starring: Munawar Saeed; Saleem Mairaj; Arif Bahalim; Rashid Farooqui; Hiba Ali; Adnan Shah (Tipu)
- Music by: Wajid Saeed
- Country of origin: Pakistan
- Original language: Urdu

Production
- Producers: Mashood Qadri; Mamoona Sheikh; Shagufta Naqvi; Talha Siddiqui; Mehreen Quadri
- Cinematography: Farhan Alam
- Running time: 79 minutes
- Production company: Kalakar Films

Original release
- Release: August 2016

Riyasat Mae Riyasat (Urdu: ریاست میں ریاست) is a Pakistani Telefilm aired on 14 August 2016 (Independence Day of Pakistan) directed by Asad Malik and written by Dr. Mashood Qadri. The melodrama, Riyasat Mae Riyasat, is an eye opener about the fragile legal and judicious system which has turned a blind eye on the deteriorating situation of the prisons: "Justice delayed is Justice Denied". The political facts of Pakistan have been brought onto the screen to open up minds against bigotries in all forms. The film shows that there is a cold war between the state, polity and the commoners. The city is being run by the local gang mafias and the police state is helpless. Thus, as per the title, there is a state within a state.

Release Network: TV One Released Date: August 14TH, 2016

== Cast ==
- Munawar Saeed as Abba
- Saleem Mairaj as Tajussus
- Rashid Farooqui as Kahil
- Adnan Shah Tipu as Khaksar
- Arif Bahalim as Mandoob
- Hiba Ali as Alina

== Plot ==
Munawar Saeed (Abba) is the Godfather to four young men. The five men are living in a low income apartment, sharing comical jokes in the middle of the night. Their intellect is shown through their dialogue but they seem as though they are typical proletarians in their physical appearance. In the midst of the story, violence has erupted in the city and heavy firing has started right outside on their street. Despite this raucous, they continue their jolly discussions as this kind of event had become routine for them. It was as if nothing has happened. The five men are critical and sarcastically bitter but they continue their routine inside the apartment. Suddenly, a new face appears in the story when they hear a knock on the door. A young beautiful girl (Hiba Ali as Alina) is screaming for help as she was frightened and horrified. The gentlemen allow her to be rescued in their apartment for over the night. This beautiful young girl is initially nervous but then begins to enjoy their unique sense of humor. All the young male characters have introduced themselves as brothers and sons of Abba (Godfather). Abba is a retired University Professor. The four young male characters now start trying hard to impress the girl with their individual bygone acumen (Arif Bahalim is a lawyer, Saleem Mairaj is a journalist, Adnan Shah is a student political activist and Rashid Farooqui is a businessman/Cricketer). During these interesting conversations, the girl has introduced herself as of Pakistani descent, but born and raised in Canada. She had come to visit her uncle, but because of the sudden eruption of violence, got stuck in their apartment.

All 5 male characters, keep teasing each other in a unique sarcastic manner in the flavor of local political and sad satire of affairs in Pakistan. They all have interesting views on global politics as well. Abba is a moderator and keeps the young men in control. He is behaving as a true guardian and is very pleasant with the girl.

Abba continues to talk about a hidden history. He keeps emphasizing the fact, the history we were taught is fabricated. Hiba Ali first confronted then started accepting the facts.

The four young men come to reveal, Abba is not their biological father. They respect him as their Godfather and have complete faith in Abba. She seems highly impressed. She is single, and she has disclosed her status, and all four young men are doing their best in their individual smartness to merry her. They all try to propose her one by one, but every time, ended up fighting within each other. She is enjoying this tug of war, or perhaps can't decide to pick who? All is executed with humor, sarcasm and eloquent prose.

In the last third of the film, two of the "sons" go out to search for the food in the middle of erupted violence. The story now makes a twist. The police tracked one of them (Saleem Mairaj) as he was wanted in a high crime. The police reached the apartment and surrounded the building. Abba convinced all the young men that if they were to fight back, Hiba Ali would get killed with them. They surrendered. Hiba Ali was actually a Police Spy and wanted to get information from these five men, who had been absconded - they were fugitives for a while. She disguised herself, Abba knew from the beginning, she was a spy, but he wanted to follow the rule of democracy, as all four young men had allowed her to be rescued that night.

In the end, Hiba Ali comes to find, these five so called convicted fellow men, though highly intelligent were the victims of political differences. They stood against the bigotry. They stood against the establishment. They made ONE mistake: they breached the LAW. She learns from them, the law. The law, which to begin with, has been made to protect: feudalism, few families, and groups - Oligarchy. The story contains three strong messages:

- Searching history is an educational process as well as of the utmost importance to find the truth, otherwise, history will be manipulated.
- Democracy is defined and has been manipulated by local establishments according to the selfish needs of the oligarchy.
- "Justice delayed is Justice Denied"

== Awards and nominations ==
- Shaan-e-Awadh International Film Award 2016 Best Screenplay
- Shaan-e-Awadh International Film Award 2016 Best Story
- 4th Indian Cine Film Festival 16 2016
