= Zainab Qayyum =

Pakistani actress and TV host (born 1975)

- زینب قیوم
- Born: Zainab Qayyum; February 1975 (age 51); Karachi, Sindh, Pakistan
- Education: Kinnaird College for Women University
- Occupations: Model; actress; television host; composer
- Years active: 2000–present

Zainab Qayyum also known as ZQ, is a Pakistani television actress, host, composer, and former model. She was crowned the best model of the year in the Lux Style Awards (2004) and was given the Most Stylish TV Actress Award in the Indus Style Awards (2006). Qayyum has appeared in numerous Urdu television series and music videos, and is known for her comic and strong antagonist roles in television serials. Some of her notable performances include Riyasat (2005), Sarkar Sahab (2007), Yeh Zindagi Hai (2008), Jalebiyan (2014), Mohabbat Ab Nahi Hogi (2015), Lagaao (2016), Aangan (2017), Phir Wohi Mohabbat (2017). She made her film debut with a cameo in action-drama Sultanat (2014) and appeared as a lawyer in Jawani Phir Nahi Aani (2015).

== Life and career ==
Qayyum was born in Karachi. She did her O-Levels in Karachi, and then moved to Lahore to study for her B.A. and M.A. She graduated from Kinnaird College with a master's degree in English literature. She taught at Lahore Grammar School for a year before joining Libas as an assistant editor. She worked there for two years while doing her Masters.

== Filmography ==
=== Film ===
Year	Title	Role	Notes
2014	Sultanat	Zainab; Aslam's sister	
2015	Jawani Phir Nahi Aani	Lawyer	

=== Television ===
Year	Title	Role	Network	Notes
2005	Riyasat	Sheri	ARY Digital	
2006	Piya Kay Ghar Jana Hai		ARY Digital; Star Utsav; Star Plus	
2006	Barsaat Raat Ki		ARY Digital	
2007	Wilco		PTV Home	
2007	Sarkar Sahab		ARY Digital	
2008	Yeh Zindagi Hai		Geo Entertainment	
2010 - 2011	Daddy	Maria	ARY Digital	
2012	Bewafaiyaan		ARY Digital	
2012	Maseeha		Hum TV	
2012	Do Naina		Express Entertainment	
2013	Kaash Aisa Ho		ARY Digital	
2013	Sisikiyaan			
2013	Chubhan		Hum TV	
2013	Qarz		ARY Digital	
2013	Taar-e-Ankaboot		Geo Entertainment	
2014	Haq Meher		ARY Digital	
2014	Mere Humdum Mere Dost	Almaas	Urdu1	
2014	Dil Majboor Sa Lagay		Express Entertainment	
2014	Muhabbat Ab Nahi Hugi	Uzma	Hum TV	
2014	Oos		PTV Home	
2014	Gardaab		ATV (Pakistan)	
2014	Jalebiyan	Sumaira	Geo Entertainment	
2014	Bhool	Ainy; Hira's mother	Hum TV	
2015	Unsuni	Wife of Protagonist	PTV Home	
2015	Kaanch Ki Guriya		Geo Entertainment	
2015	Aik Thi Misaal	Fouzia	Hum TV	
2015	Mera Yahan Koi Nahi		Geo Entertainment	
2015	Muqaddas	Tehreem	Hum TV	
2015	Mol	Sanober; Rohail's wife	Hum TV	
2015	Ali Ki Ammi		Geo Entertainment	
2015	Dilfareb		Geo Entertainment	
2015	Takkabur	Shabana	A-Plus TV	
2016	Yeh Ishq		ARY Digital	
2016	Lagaao	Naila	Hum TV	
2016	Mannat		Geo Entertainment	
2016	Kuch Na Kaho	Aliya	Hum TV	
2017	Dil-e-Majboor		TVOne Pakistan	
2017	Yaqeen Ka Safar	Romana; Women activist	Hum TV	
2017	Dil Nawaz	Hazrat Bibi	A-Plus TV	
2017	Jao Meri Guriya		A-Plus TV	
2017	Phir Wohi Mohabbat	Samra; Alishba's mother	Hum TV	
2017	Aangan	Aneela	ARY Digital	
2018	Ki Jaana Main Kaun	Maliha Kaazim	Hum TV	
2018	Band Toh Baje Ga	Naila (Mariam's mother)	Hum TV	Telefilm
2018	Khalish	Mumtaaz; Sahil's mother	Geo Entertainment	
2018	Bisaat e Dil		Hum TV	
2019	Do Bol	Nafisa; Iqbal's 2nd wife	ARY Digital	
2019	Deewar-e-Shab	Gul Naaz	Hum TV	
2019	Pakeezah Phuppo	Pakeeza	ARY Digital	
2019	Ramz-e-Ishq	Khadija Begum	Geo Entertainment	
2019	Dil-e-Gumshuda	Alizey's mother	Geo Entertainment	
2019	Tu Mera Junoon		Geo Entertainment	
2019	Shehr-e-Malal		Express Entertainment	
2019	Uraan	Aqeel's girlfriend	Geo Entertainment	
2019	Makafaat		Geo Entertainment	3 episodes
2020-2021	Faryaad	Nazia	ARY Digital	
2021	Qayamat	Nadra; Rashid's aunt & Nargi's Sister	Geo Entertainment	
2021	Shehnai	Maliha	ARY Digital	
2021	Dikhawa		Geo Entertainment	
2021	Hum Kahan Ke Sachay Thay	Shagufta	Hum TV	
2021	Wafa Bemol	Rubina	Hum TV	
2021	Amanat		ARY Digital	
2022	Inteqaam	Saba	Geo Entertainment	
2022	Badzaat	Mehrunnisa Begum	Geo Entertainment	
2022	Kaisi Teri Khudgarzi	Andaleeb	ARY Digital	
2022	Kala Doriya	Mrs Saleeqa Munir Ahmed	Hum TV	
2023	Bandish 2	Farhana	ARY Digital	
2023	Jhoom	Shehla	Geo Entertainment	
2023	Ehraam-e-Junoon	Samiya	Geo Entertainment	
2023	Khumar	Dil Araa	Geo Entertainment	
2023	Jaan-e-Jahan	Naz Begum	ARY Digital	
2024	Bayhadh	Arfa	Geo Entertainment	
2024	Burns Road Kay Romeo Juliet	Farhad's mother	ARY Digital	
2025	Dayan		Geo Entertainment	
2025	Sanwal Yaar Piya	Shaista	Geo Entertainment	
