= Manzil (Pakistani TV series) =

- Also known as: Lost Destination
- Genre: Drama; Romance
- Written by: Zubair Abbasi
- Directed by: Kamran Qureshi
- Starring: Ali Kazmi; Adnan Siddiqui; Savera Nadeem; Nabeel; Asad Malik; Khayyam Sarhadi; Deeba; Azra Aftab; Rasheed Naz; Kamran Jillani and Faiza Hasan.
- Theme music composer: Waqar Ali
- Opening theme: "Ye Uochi Nechi Manzilein" by Tina Sani
- Country of origin: Pakistan
- Original language: Urdu
- No. of episodes: 26

Production
- Producers: Humayun Saeed; Abdullah Kadwani
- Production locations: Karachi, Pakistan
- Cinematography: Syed Naeem Rizvi
- Editor: Faisal Gulzar
- Running time: 45 minutes
- Production company: 7th Sky Entertainment

Original release
- Network: ARY TV
- Release: 2006

Manzil (Urdu: منزل) is a 2006 Pakistani TV serial about a girl living in a hostel far from her hometown who falls in love with a boy. The serial is directed by Kamran Qureshi, written by Zubair Abbasi and produced by Humayun Saeed & Abdullah Kadwani's production house 7th Sky Entertainment.

The English title of the serial is Lost Destination and it was broadcast on ARY TV. Manzil is an intense drama about a girl's courage, determination and convictions of her heart.

== Plot ==
Somia (Savera Nadeem) belongs to a wealthy family from valley of Swat and is the only child of her parents. She is studying in university and lives in a hostel in Karachi.

One of her class fellows, Sajid (Adnan Siddiqui), falls in love with her, but she thinks him as a very good friend. She herself is in love with Mehroze (Nabeel), who is a son of feudal lord.

Somia and Mehroze quietly marry without bringing in the knowledge of her or Mehroz's parents and Somia gets pregnant. Sanwal (Aslam Sheikh), who is Mehroze's cousin, murders him due to enmity on the issues of properties.

Somia's father Sajjad Khan (Khayyam Sarhadi) and mother Mahjabeen (Deeba) accept the proposal of Yawar (Asad Malik) for her. They fix the wedding date and calls Somia to come back as she is about to finish her studies being in the final year.

Somia gives birth to a baby girl and leaves her new born with her friend Sajid and promises to come back to take her daughter back. She speaks to her mother and refuses for the marriage but her mum does not listen to her refusal and tells her that she will get killed by her father if she refused.

Somia gets married again with Yawar this time. Sajid sets off for Swat with the baby. When he arrives Somia's home asks about her, he is told that she got married few days back. When asked about the baby, by Somia's father, he tells that it is his own baby. Sajid leaves taking baby with him.

Somia has a son called Shabi (Ali Kazmi). Sajid never gets married, brings up Sobia (Faiza Hasan) and tells her that her mother died long ago. He has close relations with his friend Hashmi (Rashid Farooqi) and his wife Mehnaz, whilst their son Farzan (Kamran Jillani) is a good friend of Faiza.

Faiza accidentally comes across with Somia on airport one day when she recognizes her because she has a big portrait of Somia hanged in her home. She is shocked to see Somia. Somia becomes psycho patient and eventually dies. Sajid can't bear this loss again and dies right after her death.

== Cast ==
=== Main cast ===
- Adnan Siddiqui as Sajid
- Savera Nadeem as Somia
- Nabeel Zafar as Mehroz Shahani
- Asad Malik as Yawar Khan
- Zaheen Tahira as Hani
- Khayyam Sarhadi as Sajjad Khan
- Deeba as Mahjabeen
- Azra Aftab as Khanam
- Rasheed Naz as Hayat Khan
- Ali Kazmi as Shabi
- Faiza Hasan as Sobia
- Kamran Jillani as Farzan Hashmi

=== Recurring cast ===
- Rashid Farooqi as Hashmi
- Farah Nadeem as Mehnaz
- Aslam Sheikh as Sanwal
- Yar Muhammad Shah as Gohram Shahani
- Manzoor Murad as Rustam
- Ghazala Javed as Salma
- Gaysoo as Nabeela
- Seema Nasir as Maggi
- Kulsum Sultan

== Soundtrack ==
External videos
- A promotional video of Makan

The theme song Ye Unchi Nechi Manzilein was composed by Waqar Ali and sung by Tina Sani. Lyricist was M Nasir and music video was released in 2006.

== See also ==
- Moorat
- Riyasat
- Makan
- Sarkar Sahab
- Ishq Ki Inteha
- Choti Si Kahani
