= Zip Bus Chup Raho =

2011 Pakistani drama serial on Geo Entertainment

- Genre: Drama
- Written by: Irfan Ahmed
- Directed by: Shaquielle Khan
- Starring: Ayesha Khan; Sakina Samo; Humayun Saeed; Nauman Masood
- Opening theme: "Zip" by shibani
- Country of origin: Pakistan
- Original language: Urdu
- No. of episodes: 23

Production
- Producers: Humayun Saeed; Abdullah Kadwani
- Production company: 7th Sky Entertainment

Original release
- Network: Geo TV"
- Release: 24 January – 29 June 2011

Zip Bus Chup Raho (Urdu: زِپ بس چپ رہو, lit. 'Zip: Just Stay Quiet') was an Urdu weekly drama series that ran on Geo TV. It was the story of a woman named Parveen Un Nisa, who is the mother of Jibi and Taby. Her husband mysteriously left her a few years ago which led to her facing many challenges as a single parent. This story unveils how society treats a woman once trapped, especially when a woman without her husband carries the responsibilities of their children. Retitled as Tumko Khamosh Rehna Hai, it also aired in India on Zee Zindagi.

== Synopsis ==
"The story is the emotional and traumatic journey of Parveen un Nisa, a woman living in a postmodernist society, where individuals are valued on the basis of their skills and their socio-economic achievements. She is not skilled or bright enough to live up to the expectations and demands of such societies. She has always been a housewife with a son and daughter who are very demanding. Her husband could not cope the needs and demands of life and escapes. Naïve Parveen does not know much about the dynamics of vicious social structure around her and starts getting exploited by a woman named Gypsy. Gypsy is basically the bad side of patriarchal system, a kind of a woman who serves men at the expense of exploiting women like Parveen and reinforcing the status quo. She transforms Parveen into Paro. Parveen has never been happy being Paro, the good woman inside her keeps asserting, nonetheless it is not easy to get out of such clutches. Will Parveen be able to break the shackles and set herself free? Or her family and her familial problems will continue bogging this woman down?"

This frustration and fear misleads her to trust women called Gypsy who claims to be a socialite, but in reality she exploit vulnerable women and trains them to become an object of rich business tycoons.

Here comes the twist, will Paro be able to hide who exactly she is? Or will she be getting a chance by a society to turn and established her identity back to Parveen and live a normal life with her children by refusing this grimy trade and lead the life of a respectable woman.

== Cast ==
- Ayesha Khan as Parveenunissa (Parro)
- Sakina Sammo as Gypsy
- Humayun Saeed as Ozair/Omair
- Nauman Maqsood as Haseeb Durrani
- Asad Malik as Manzoor Hussain
- Mohib Mirza as Raij
- Annie Jaffry as Tabby
- Nazli Nasr as Munazzah (Manno)
- Babar Khan as Adnan
- Natasha Saleem as Lisa
- Ayesha Khan as Adan
- Mudassir Waqar as Sameer
