= Kamran Qureshi =

British filmmaker

Kamran Qureshi FHEA
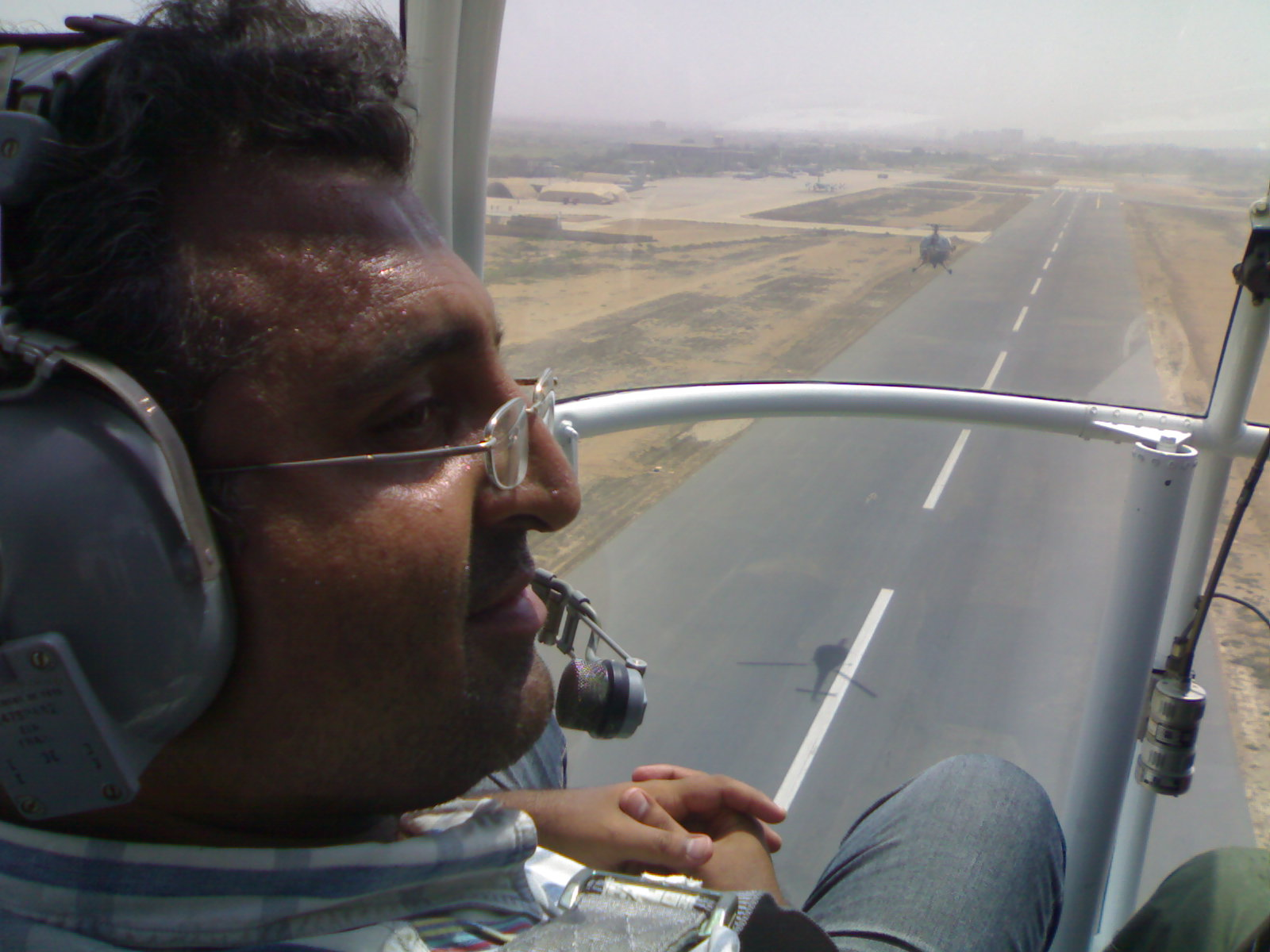
- Qureshi in June 2009
- Born: 3 October 1975 (age 50)
- Other names: Cameron, Cam, Kam
- Education: MA, MBA, PhD
- Alma mater: National Film and Television School; London Film School; London Film Academy
- Occupations: Filmmaker & TV Director, producer, and academic
- Years active: 1992 - present
- Known for: Ariel Mothers
- Notable work: Nestlé Nido Young Stars and Riyasat
- Spouse: Iram Qureshi (m. 2002-present)
- Children: Hareem Qureshi, Huda Qureshi, Michelle Qureshi

Academic background
- Thesis: Only love matters : a creative, critical exploration of intersex characters in English language films (2022)
- Academic advisors: Richard J. Hand, Eylem Atakav

Academic work
- Discipline: Film and TV production
- Website: Official website

Kamran Qureshi (born 3 October 1975) is a filmmaker, known for his films, TV shows and drama series on women, children, and intersex issues. His 2023 family romantic-drama feature film, Only Love Matters, is the first film about intersex people set in the UK.

== Early life and education ==
Kamran Qureshi was born on 3 October 1975.

He has attended the National Film and Television School, London Film School, and London Film Academy, earning an MA, MBA, and PhD.

He is a Fellow of the Higher Education Academy.

== Career ==
=== Film ===
Qureshi started as digital video effects designer for TV channels and advertising agencies in 1992 and later joined a television production house Telewise in 1995 as an editor and director. His journey into direction with branded programmes: Fanta Candid Camera, Allen Soothers Boom Bastic, Teleworld's Thrill Seekers, Cheer Up, Voyage of Discovery branded TV transmission sponsored by John Player Gold Leaf, Har Dam Tayyar on Military Forces by Embassy, and Ariel Mothers, sponsored by Procter and Gamble.

Qureshi directed branded TV shows, drama serials, documentaries and films. He made his first telefilm on intersex titled Murad (Desire), which brought him first award for Best Director and Best telefilm at the 2003 Indus Telefilm Festival. Then he directed a 13-part TV films series, Maa Aur Mamta' (Motherhood), which won seven awards at the Indus Drama Awards 2005. In 2004, he directed his first drama serial "Moorat", for 7th Sky Entertainment.

His 2023 family romantic-drama feature film Only Love Matters is the first film in cinema history on the topic of intersex people set in the UK.

=== Academia ===
Qureshi is a media and gender studies researcher and has taught at the University of East Anglia (2019-2022), and at Solent University. He works as a peer reviewer for Humanities and Social Sciences Communications.

== Selected filmography ==
- Only Love Matters (2023)
- Choti Si Kahani (Sunsilk and Fair & Lovely) - Brand endorsement TV serial
- Moorat
- Riyasat, a.k.a. Kingdom of Hearts
- Manzil, a.k.a. Her Lost Destination
- Makan a.k.a. Home a Heaven
- Sarkar Sahab a.k.a. Evicted Lord
- Ishq Ki Inteha Aka Unbounded Love
- Ariel Mothers a.k.a. Ariel Maa - Talk Show
- Pepsi Top of the Pops - Music Charts
- Wall's Paddle Pop Kids Club - Kids Show
- Murad
- Meharun Nisa

== Awards and nominations ==
Awarded to his films
Year	Title	Events	Nominations	Wins
2023	Only Love Matters	New York Movie Awards, Hollywood Gold Awards, Paris Film Awards, Rome International Movie Awards, Berlin Indie Film Festival, Montreal Independent Film Festival, Toronto International Women Film Festival, LA Independent Women Film Awards, Engagement Award of the University of East Anglia	18	32
2012	Choti Si Kahani	Pakistan Media Awards	6	0
2010	Ishq Ki Inteha	9th Lux Style Awards	1	0
2009	Sarkar Sahab	8th Lux Style Awards	3	0
2007	Makan	6th Lux Style Awards	1	0
2006	Riyasat	5th Lux Style Awards	2	2
2005	Moorat	4th Lux Style Awards	4	0
2005	Maa aur Mamta	1st Indus Drama Awards	11	7
2003	Murad	Indus Telefilm Festival	0	3
2002	Ariel Mothers	PTV Award	0	1

Awarded to him as director/producer
Year	Nominated work	Award	Category	Result
2023	Only Love Matters	University of East Anglia	UAE Engagement Award (special recognition)	Won
2022	Only Love Matters	University of East Anglia	Innovation & Impact Awards	Finalist
2021	Only Love Matters	Top Indie Film Awards Tokyo	Best Original Idea	Won
2021	Only Love Matters	Vancouver International Film Awards	Best First Time Director	Won
2021	Only Love Matters	Paris Film Awards	Best Director (Honourable Mention)	Won
2021	Only Love Matters	Hollywood Gold Awards	Best Director Feature Film	Won
2021	Only Love Matters	Berlin Indie Film Festival	Best Director Feature Film	Won
2012	Choti Si Kahani	Pakistan Media Awards	Best Director Drama Series	Nominee
2010	Ishq Ki Inteha	Lux Style Awards	Best Producer Drama Serial	Nominee
2009	Sar Kar Sahab	Lux Style Awards	Best Director Drama Serial	Nominee
2007	Makan	Lux Style Awards	Best Director Drama Serial	Nominee
2006	Riayasat	Lux Style Awards	Best Serial Satellite Award	Won
2006	Riayasat	Lux Style Awards	Best Director Drama Serial	Nominee
2005	Moorat	Lux Style Awards	Best Director Drama Serial	Nominee
2005	Maa aur Mamta	Indus Drama Awards	Best Drama Series Award	Won
2003	Murad	Indus Telefilm Festival	Best Telefilm Award	Won
