= Waqar Ali =

Pakistani musician and singer

- Origin: Karachi, Pakistan
- Genres: Pop
- Occupations: Singer, musician and music album producer
- Instrument: Piano Keyboard
- Label: Sound Master

Waqar Ali (Urdu: وقار علی; born 16 January 1966) is a Pakistani musician and singer. Ali has produced many albums and singles for the Pakistan film industry. His father is the classical singer Shafqat Hussein, and Waqar Ali often works with his elder brother Sajjad Ali. Ali composed the music for the 1998 film Aik Aur Love Story and is the composer of the 2007 Pakistani TV drama series Sill.

He has worked with singers Rahat Fateh Ali Khan, Sajjad Ali, Shabnam Majeed, Atif Aslam, Lucky Ali, Qurat-ul-Ain Balouch and others. Over recent decades, Waqar Ali has evolved into one of the best TV music composers in Pakistan.

== Discography ==
=== Music albums and TV drama serials ===
Waqar Ali's focus has been mainly TV drama serial theme songs:

- Jane Woh Kaise Log The Jinke Pyar Ko Pyar Mila, TV Drama Serial, Pyarey Afzal (2013)
- Vicky (1986) Music Album
- Vicky and Ayesha (1998) Music Album
- Eik Tara (2000) Music Album
- Mera Naam Hai Mohabbat (2001) Music Album
- Aansoo (2000) TV Drama Serial
- Thori Khushi Thora Gham (2002) Drama Serial
- Moorat (2004) ARY Digital Drama Serial
- Chandni (TV series) Drama Serial
- Riyasat Drama Serial
- Humsafar (2011) Hum TV Drama Serial ("Waqar Ali's breakthrough to real success")
- Manzil Drama Serial
- Makan Drama Serial
- Sarkar Sahab Drama Serial
- Sukhay Pattay (Joint Pakistan-India drama serial, Waqar Ali composed the background music)
- Sill Drama Serial
- Ashk Drama Serial
- Thakan Drama Serial
- Roshan Sitara Drama Serial
- Ab ke sawan barse Drama Serial
- Behkawa Drama Serial
- Main baba ki ladli Drama Serial
- Jannat se nikali hui aurat Drama Serial
- Mata-e-jaan hai tu Drama Serial
- Do Qadam Door Thay Drama Serial
- Nadamat Drama Serial
- Meri Ladli Drama Serial
- Meri Beti Drama Serial
- Tanha bikhra toota mera mann Drama Serial
- Aisa Kyun Drama Serial
- Tishnagi Drama Serial
- Khuda Ki Basti Drama Serial
- Khushboo ka ghar Drama Serial
- Bahu Rani Drama Serial
- Umme Kulsoom Drama Serial
- Maaye Ni Drama Serial
- Mera Saaein
- Jo Chale Tu Jaan se Guzar Gaye Drama Serial
- Main Chand Si Drama Serial
- Ek Nazar Meri Taraf Drama Serial
- Mehmoodabad Ki Malkain Drama Serial
- Kuch Pyar Ka Pagalpan Bhi Tha Drama Serial
- Mera Saaein 2
- Bin Teray Drama Serial
- Dil-i-Muztar Drama Serial with award-winning soundtrack by Waqar Ali
- Pyaray Afzal (2013) Drama serial
- Teri Berukhi Drama Serial
- Good Morning Pakistan TV show

== Filmography ==
- Aik Aur Love Story (1999)
- Love Mein Ghum (2011)
- Wrong No. (2015)
- Bin Roye (2015) song "O Yara" singer : Ankit Tiwari, Composed by Waqar Ali
- Laloolal.com (2016)

=== Singles ===
- Paisay Anay De (early 1990s)
- Thori Khushi Thora Gham
- Tumhare Husn Ka Jalwa Jo Aam Ho Jaaye, Sung by and music composed by Waqar Ali
- Tuhfa tujhe teri salgira
- Mera naam hae muhabbat
- Aansoo (2000), PTV drama serial's Title Song composed by Waqar Ali
- Shikwa nahin, na dard koi bhi
- Tum kaesi muhabbat karte ho ?
- Bin Tere

== Awards ==
- Nigar Award for Best Music Director in 1999 for Aik Aur Love Story (1999 film).
