= Only Love Matters =

- Directed by: Kamran Qureshi
- Screenplay by: Iannis Aliferis
- Story by: Kamran Qureshi
- Produced by: Iram Qureshi
- Starring: Emma von Schreiber; Matthew Wright-Kenny; Sara Faraj; Josh Simpson; Kainaaz Pervez; Allie Denison; Verity Hayes
- Cinematography: Marco Marco; Kamran Qureshi; Shehroze Khan; Aijaz Shamsi; Waqas Mirza
- Edited by: A. Mannan Wai Qureshi
- Music by: Phillip McHugh; Rishi Singh; David Edmonds; Jeffrey Weeks Harrison
- Production company: KQ Movies
- Release date: 2023
- Running time: 92 minutes
- Country: United Kingdom

Only Love Matters is a 2023 drama film directed by Kamran Qureshi, notable for its focus on intersex characters.

The film had its world premiere in Marbella, Spain, UK premiere in BFI Southbank London, and regional premiere during Southampton Film Week.

== Plot ==
This film narrates the story of a young woman whose romantic life is disrupted when she discovers a book detailing the life of its intersex author. The book serves as a catalyst for her to confront her own history. The plot also explores the experiences of an intersex mother who sacrifices for her adopted daughter and advocates for the rights of intersex individuals. Her life is a testament to overcoming adversity, transitioning from a challenging upbringing in a small village to achieving significant success. Throughout her journey, themes of love, friendship, and humor play a vital role. The narrative intertwines the lives of two women from different generations, underscoring the enduring importance of love.

== Film cast ==
- Emma von Schreiber as Stephanie Malcolm
- Matthew Wright-Kenny as Ryan Raymond
- Sara Faraj as Sam Davidson
- Josh Simpson as Darren Davidson
- Kainaaz Pervez as Old Sam Davidson
- Patrick Clarke as David Davidson
- Allie Denison as Hannah Goldberg
- Ben Gardner Gray as Stavros Niarchos
- Fran Walker as Jane Douglas
- Adnan Jelani as Suneil
- Angela Peters as Martha Davidson
- Elizabeth Prideaux as Natasha
- Kanwal Nazar Khan as Sai
- Anas Yaseen as Little Sam
- Scarlett Amelie Ross as Little Steph

== Production ==
The film's principal photography was conducted in over 40 locations, primarily in London, and includes segments set in the 1970s in the Great Indian Desert. Other notable locations include the Royal Standard of England in Beaconsfield, historic sites in the Thar Desert, and various urban settings. Only Love Matters aims to provide a realistic portrayal of intersex individuals, shifting away from the typical media narratives that have historically marginalized or stereotyped such identities. It incorporated input from intersex experts during its screenplay development.The film's research and excerpts were presented at the University of Westminster, Nagoya University, the University of Reading, and in the INIA Network, supported by the European Commission.

== Music ==
The film features an original song titled "Piya", reflecting regional desert music traditions. It was composed by Indian composer Rishi Singh and performed by vocalist Manjeera Ganguly, with lyrics by Fatima Najeeb, inspired by the character Sam's experiences in the desert. The English title song, "Only Love Matters", is a slow ballad composed by Phillip McHugh, performed by Ashley Sollars and Josephine McHugh, with narrative-driven lyrics centered on love.

== Awards and recognition ==
Festival	Category	Recipient	Result
Berlin Indie Film Festival	Best Director Feature Film	Kamran Qureshi	Won
Big Syn International Film Festival, London	Best Producer	Iram Qureshi	Won
Gangtok International Film Festival	Best Women's Film	Iram Qureshi	Won
