= Jalebiyan =

- Title screen
- Genre: Sitcom
- Written by: Asad Bukhari
- Directed by: Danish Nawaz
- Starring: Mehmood Aslam; Maria Wasti; Zainab Qayyum
- Country of origin: Pakistan
- Original language: Urdu

Production
- Production company: Evolution Media Productions

Original release
- Network: Geo TV
- Release: 2014

Jalebiyan (Urdu: جلیبیاں) is a Pakistani comedy sitcom airing on Geo TV written by Asad Bukhari, directed by Danish Nawaz and produced by Evolution Media Productions.

== Plot outline ==
Tafangam has two has two wives and his life runs like a storm between the two. The first wife, Noor Jahan, was his mother's choice. She is a village girl who is illiterate but fond of Urdu literature poetry and adds her own lines to the poetry. The second wife, Sumaira, is Tafangam's choice whom he married for love. She is a working lady with model looks and an expert on English language which provokes Tafangam to respond and in his rather poor English. Life was good while both the wives were unaware of each other's existence, but Tafangam finds himself in a tough spot when Noor Jahan drops in at his city apartment from nowhere. Now Tafangam is in a position where he can't disclose to Sumaira that Noor Jahan is his first wife who knows the truth about Sumaira. The story revolves around Tafangam, Noor Jahan and Sumaira with an occasional guest appearance of a new character.

== Cast ==
- Mehmood Aslam as Tafangam
- Maria Wasti as Noor Jahan
- Zainab Qayyum as Sumaira
- Faisal Qureshi (special appearance)
