= Lagaao =

Television serial

- Genre: Drama; Romance film
- Written by: Waseem Ahmad
- Directed by: Ali Masud Saeed
- Starring: Saniya Shamshad; Babar Khan; Zainab Qayyum; Maryam Fatima; Mehmood Aslam; Adnan Jaffar; Saman Ansari; Attiya Khan; Shamim Hilaly; Farah Nadeem; Munawar Saeed
- Theme music composer: Wajid Saeed
- Opening theme: Raba Meri Kya Haal Sunaye by Singer; Faiza Mujahid; Lyrics by Ali
- Composer: Sahir Ali Bagga
- Country of origin: Pakistan
- Original language: Urdu
- No. of episodes: 35

Production
- Producer: M.D. Productions
- Production location: Karachi
- Editors: Jameel Awan; Ikhlaq Ahmad
- Camera setup: Multi-camera
- Running time: 30-45 minutes

Original release
- Network: Hum TV
- Release: 18 January – 16 May 2016

Related
- Ek Thi Misaal

Lagaao (Urdu: لگاؤ; lit. Attachment) is a Pakistani romantic drama serial aired on Hum TV. It was written by Waseem Ahmad, directed by Ali Masud Saeed, and produced by Momina Duraid. It stars Saniya Shamshad, Babar Khan, Zainab Qayyum, Maryam Fatima, Saman Ansari, Attiya Khan, Shamim Hilaly, Mehmood Aslam, and Adnan Jaffar, among others.

== Synopsis ==
Lagaao is the story of three friends: Nyla (Zainab Qayyum), Amber (Attiya Khan), and Sitwat (Saman Ansari). Nyla is married to Abeer (Adnan Jaffar) and has a daughter Maham (Maryam Fatima).

Amber is married to Rana (Mehmood Aslam) and has a daughter Sumbul (Saniya Shamshad). Sumbul does not support her cruel father. Rana expresses that she does not want the death of her father, but she wants him to cancel his harsh policies. She loved Farhan (Babar Khan), but her father told her to marry his friend's son, which she refused. Nyla sees Abeer more attached to Amber, as he wants to marry her. When Sumbul calls, he comes without letting his wife know. Sitwat is not married but secretly wants Abeer. Finally, Maham refuses to consider him as her father.

Amber's paternal aunt (Shamim Hilaly) comes to Amber's house and wants Amber to marry another man. She first tried to marry Amber with Abeer, who somehow did not know that he was married to Nyla. Maham stopped talking with Sumbul prior to saying that she had always liked Abeer to marry Amber. Nyla and Abeer grew apart as Nyla saw Abeer and Amber in the restaurant. Nyla tried to divorce Abeer until she lived with her eldest brother. Sumbul and Maham also grew apart. Sitwat became happy as she was told by Nyla that she should get divorced.

Amber had a factory problem, which she asked Abeer to solve; which he did. Amber tried to hide this from Sumbul. Sumbul and Amber's aunt want Amber to marry Abeer. Sitwat dies in a car accident before their marriage. Sitwat and her closest were closely related. Sitwat's nephew liked Sitwat, as he thought she was right in her actions.

Abeer divorces Nyla but she does not sign the document. Nyla went to her friend Sumera's home to live life. Sumera suggested she marry again. Nyla became happy as she was not divorced. Nyala decided to come to Pakistan and live together. Amber decided to live with Sumbul prior to Chachi Bi's return to her original home. Abeer lived with his old family. Safdar Rana (Taimoor Rana's brother, Sumbul's paternal uncle) came to take Sumbul, as she was his niece.

== Cast ==
- Saniya Shamshad as Sumbul (Antagonist)
- Babar Khan as Farhan (Antagonist)
- Maryam Fatima as Maham (Antagonist)
- Zainab Qayyum as Nyla (Protagonist)
- Saman Ansari as Sitwat (Protagonist) - Episode #15
- Attiya Khan as Amber (Protagonist) (Sumbul's mother) (Taimoor Rana's 2nd wife)
- Adnan Jaffar as Abeer (Protagonist)
- Humaira Ali as Nadra (Taimoor Rana's 1st wife) (Guest appearance)
- Mehmood Aslam as Rana (Sumbul's father) (Guest appearance) - Episode #1
- Ali Abbas as Emmad
- Shamim Hilaly as Chachi Bi (Amber's paternal uncle's wife)
- Munawar Saeed as Safdar Rana (Taimoor Rana's brother, Sumbul's paternal uncle and taya)
- Farah Nadeem as Najma (Farhan's mother)
- Mahi Baloch as Ashmara (Imaad's first cousin)
- Hamza Bajwa
- Sofia Khan

== See also ==
- 2016 in Pakistani television
- List of programs broadcast by Hum TV
