= Ishq Ki Inteha =

- Also known as: Unbounded Love
- Genre: Drama; Crime; Romance
- Written by: Zafar Mairaj
- Directed by: Kamran Qureshi; Iram Qureshi
- Starring: Humayun Saeed; Sarwat Gilani; Samina Peerzada; Usmaan Peerzada; Rubina Ashraf; Saud; Kashif Mehmood; Madiha Iftikhar; Shakeel; Mehmood Aslam; Saira Wasti; Hassan Niazi.
- Theme music composer: Usman Kunji
- Opening theme: "Meray Ishq Ki" by Naeem Abbas Rufi
- Country of origin: United Kingdom
- Original languages: Urdu; Hindi
- No. of episodes: 26

Production
- Producers: Kamran Qureshi; Raheel Rao
- Production locations: Karachi, Pakistan
- Cinematography: Mirza Mehmood
- Editor: Imran Wai Qureshi
- Running time: 45 minutes
- Production companies: Evergreen Media Europe; Pinnacle Productions

Original release
- Network: Geo Entertainment UK, United States, Pakistan
- Release: 2009–10

Ishq Ki Inteha (Urdu: عشق كى انتہا, lit. 'The Extreme of Passion') is a TV serial directed by Kamran Qureshi and Iram Qureshi written by Zafar Mairaj and produced by Raheel Rao and Kamran Qureshi.

This serial is about the trapping of women, by organised criminal groups, into working in jails and saloons for prostitution and illegal work. Also, the gang activities utilising young boys being forcibly employed, encouraging habitual drunkards for gambling by providing debts and later blackmailing.

== Plot ==
Bakhtawar (Sarwat Gilani), an educated girl from a lower-class family, loves Farhad (Humayun Saeed), son of a millionaire Malik Jalal (Usmaan Peerzada). Farhad is abroad for higher studies and they have another fellow university mate, Rashid (Kashif Mehmood), a junior lawyer, who is sacrificing his love for Bakhtawar knowing her bend and helps her as much as he can.

After Bakhtawar's father died, her mother (Rubina Ashraf) married Qayyum (Mehmood Aslam), a gambler and drunkard, who now has a debt of ten hundred thousand from Sheru (Saud), the manager of a gambling place. Sheru threatens to take his son Shehzad (Hassan Niazi) as a hostage if he doesn't pay his debt within a month. However, seeing Bakhtawar's beauty, Sheru offers Qayyum a new deal, which is that he won't take Qayyum's son if Qayyum marries Bakhtawar to him. Qayyum readily agrees, as Bakhtawar is only his stepdaughter.

The morning of the wedding, Farhad arrives and beats up Sheru. He takes Bakhtawar to his home, but his father disapproves and insults her. A distressed Bakhtawar runs home, only to find Qayyum beating her mother. She hits Qayyum on the head so hard that he dies.

Bakhtawar is arrested. In jail, she meets a woman Shehnaz (Samina Peerzada), who gives her an address for a job. Rashid fights for Bakhtawar, and she is released. Shehnaz works for Malik Jalal, who is an underworld Don; they run illegal businesses and present beautiful girls to bureaucrats to get their files signed. Bakhtawar joins Shehnaz for work, who sends her to a client's home, where she is planned raped.

After this shock, Bakhtawar marries Rashid, but when they run into the same rapist in a restaurant, Rashid storms off. Bakhtawar discovers her pregnancy and has a baby girl. However, she then receives divorce papers while still in the hospital, causing her mother to have a heart attack and pass away. Bakhtawar again joins Shehnaz, managing her salon to afford Shehzad's studies.

Shehzad completes studies, gets a good job and becomes infatuated with Farhad's sister Romana (Madiha Iftikhar) but doesn't realize who she is until he shows her picture to Bakhtawar.

Farhad meets Bakhtawar at a party and again tries to get attention from her. He gives special attention to her daughter, Minhal (Hareem Qureshi). Shehnaz forces Bakhtawar to marry Farhad, which she refuses but later agrees due to her daughter. Bakhtawar doesn't keep any physical relations with him. The day Bakhtawar realizes her love for him, Farhad is murdered by Sheru.

Bakhtawar thinks that Malik Jalal had murdered Farhad due to their marriage and goes to kill him. He denies Farhad's murder, but she doesn't believe him and pulls a gun on him. Sheru then arrives and reveals that he killed Farhad, then kills his boss, Malik Jalal, only to be killed by Bakhtawar.

Farhad's mother (Saira Wasti) loses her mind after her son and husband's murder. She moves to her old home alone. Bakhtawar turns herself in and is jailed. Rashid returns and fights her case in court. Baby Minhal remains with Shehnaz. Rashid wins the case and Bakhtawar is released. Bakhtawar tells Rashid that Minhal is his daughter.

== Cast ==
=== Main cast ===
- Humayun Saeed as Malik Farhad
- Sarwat Gilani as Bakhtawar
- Samina Peerzada as Madam Shehnaz
- Usmaan Peerzada as Malik Jalal
- Rubina Ashraf as Bakhtawar's Mother
- Saud as Sharru
- Kashif Mehmood as Rashid
- Madiha Iftikhar as Romana
- Shakeel as Rauf
- Mehmood Aslam as Qayyum
- Saira Wasti as Rabia
- Hassan Niazi as Shehzad

=== Supporting cast ===
- Saleem Miraj as Sheru's Man
- Adil Wadia as Farooqi Sahab
- Tasneem Ansari as Rauf's Wife
- Hareem Qureshi as Minhal
- Hassan Shaheed Mirza

== Soundtrack ==
External videos
- A promotional video of Ishq Ki Inteha

The theme song was sung by Naeem Abbas Rufi composed by Usman Kunji and lyricists was Shariq Naqvi.

== Awards and nominations ==
9th Lux Style Awards

- Nominated - Best TV Serial (2010) produced by Raheel Rao & Kamran Qureshi.

== See also ==
- Makan
- Moorat
- Riyasat
- Sarkar Sahab
