= Rashid Farooqui =

Pakistani actor

- راشد فاروقی
- Born: 3 January 1969 (age 57); Karachi, Sindh, Pakistan
- Other name: Rashid Farooqi
- Occupation: Actor
- Years active: 1991–present

Rashid Farooqui is a Pakistani films television and theatre actor. He is known for his villainous roles, such as Inspector Ibrahim in Laal Kabootar.

== Career ==
Rashid Farooqui started his acting career in theatre and later became a television actor. He has appeared in various television series and telefilms in Pakistan, including the telefilms Too Late, The Reformer, and Shahrukh Khan Ki Maut (2005). Farooqui made his Lollywood debut in Mehreen Jabbar's drama film Ramchand Pakistani (2008), in which he played the lead role and got nominated for the Lux Style Award for Best Actor. In 2009, Farooqui appeared in Insha'Allah, followed by Maalik (2016). He has also made an appearance in the 2016 film Zindagi Kitni Haseen Hay.

== Filmography ==
Film	Role	Year	Notes
Shahrukh Khan Ki Maut	Ustad Manzoor	2005	short-film
Ramchand Pakistani	Shankar	2008	Nomination for Lux Style Award
Insha'Allah	Abbas Shan	2009	short-film
Mah e Mir	Nawaz	2016	Official submission for 89th Academy Awards
Riyasat Mae Riyasat	Kahil	2016	Telefilm
Maalik	Inspector	2016	
Zindagi Kitni Haseen Hai		2016	
Laal Kabootar	Inspector Ibrahim	2019	
John		2023	Movie

=== Television ===
Year	Name/Title	Role	Channel	Ref(s)
2004	Moorat	Eunuch Chamki	ARY Digital	
	Manzil	Hashmi	ARY Digital	
2006	Makan	Faizan	Geo Entertainment	
2007	Man-o-Salwa	Sultan	Hum TV	
2007	Wilco	Sindhi villager	PTV Home	
2009	Bulbulay		ARY Digital	
	Meri Zaat Zarra-e-Benishan	Amin	Geo Entertainment	
2010	Zeenat Bint-e-Sakina Hazir Ho		Geo Entertainment	
2010	Aashti		Hum TV	
2011	Meray Khwab Raiza Raiza	Anwar Ali	Hum TV	
2011	Choti Si Kahani	Muneer Hussain	PTV Home	
2011	Jal Pari		Geo Entertainment	
2011	Zindagi Dhoop Tum Ghana Saya	Hafeez	ARY Digital	
2012	Khushboo Ka Ghar		ARY Digital	
	Mohabbat Jaye Bhar Mein	Ismail	Hum TV	
	Mohabat Subh Ka Sitara Hai	Romaisa's father	Hum TV	
	Rehaai		Hum TV	
2013	Nanhi		Geo Entertainment	
2015	Riyasat		ARY Digital	
2015	Khatoon Manzil	Wajid	ARY Digital	
2016	Main Kamli	Zulekha's father	Aaj Entertainment	
2016	Ab Kar Meri Rafugari		ARY Digital	
2016	Haya Ke Daaman Main		Hum TV	
2016	Choti Si Zindagi	Irfan	Hum TV	
2016	Zara Yaad Kar	Uzma's father	Hum TV	
2017	Khamoshi	Sabir's friend	Hum TV	
2017	Adhoora Bandhan	Aijaz	Geo Entertainment	
2017	Aao Laut Chalein		Geo Entertainment	
2017	Champa Aur Chambeli		Geo Entertainment	
2017	Khaani	Salman	Geo Entertainment	
2018	Belapur Ki Dayan	Inspector	Hum TV	
2018	Khuwabzaadi		TVOne	
	Zamani Manzil Kay Maskharay		Geo Entertainment	
2019	Makafaat		Geo Entertainment	
2019	Tu Mera Junoon		Geo Entertainment	
2019	Janbaaz		PTV Home	
2020	Khoob Seerat	Dilkash's father	Geo Entertainment	
2020	Makafaat 2		Geo Entertainment	
2020	Tamanna		Geo Entertainment	
2020	Bikhray Moti	Tufail	ARY Digital	
2020	Dunk		ARY Digital	
2021	Raqs e Bismil	Saranga	Hum TV	
2021	Parizaad	Shabbir	Hum TV	
2021	Rang Mahal	Rehmat (Mahpara's father)	Geo Entertainment	
2021	Mohabbat Daagh Ki Soorat	Afaq's father	Geo Entertainment	
2021	Azmaish	Sikander (Nimra's biological father)	ARY Digital	
2022	Dil-e-Veeran		ARY Digital	
2022	Dil-e-Momin	Cameo	Geo Entertainment	
2022	Inaam e Mohabbat	Kareem	Geo Entertainment	
2022	Guddu	Fareed	Geo Entertainment	
2025	Sanwal Yaar Piya	Nazeer B	Geo Entertainment	

== Accolades ==
Ceremony	Category	Film	Result
8th Lux Style Awards	Best Film Actor	Ramchand Pakistani	Nominated
18th Lux Style Awards	Best Film Actor-Critics' Choice	Laal Kabootar	Won
