= Afshan Ahmed =

Pakistani singer

- افشاں احمد
- Born: Afshan Ahmed Begum; 22 September 1966 (age 60); Lahore, Pakistan
- Other name: Madame Afshan
- Occupation: Singer
- Years active: 1970s – present
- Television: PTV
- Parent: Asma Ahmed (mother)

Afshan Ahmed (born 22 September 1966) is a Pakistani singer who is known for her television and radio songs like "Dosti Aisa Naata" and "Meray Bachpan Ke Din", and others.

== Early life ==
Afshan's family migrated to Pakistan from India in 1965. Her mother Asma Ahmed was a singer at All India Radio. In the 1970s, Asma did playback singing in films and was paired with singer Akhlaq Ahmed. Afshan started singing in a children's television program, Hamari Shaam, at a young age. She then joined the musician Sohail Rana's shows for children, Kaliyon Ki Mala and Hum Sooraj Chand Sitaray. She was appreciated for singing the song, "Dosti Aisa Naata".

== Career ==
Later, she sang many songs for Pakistan Television during the 1980s and 1990s, including the popular wedding song, "Babula Way Lay Jayn Na Loag Mujk Ko". In 1982, she also appeared in a Binaca toothpaste commercial at age 16.

Afshan performed at the Children's Literature Festival in 2016 and sang "Gaao Mere Sung", "Jeevey, Jeevey Pakistan", "Yeh Des Hamara Hai" and a favourite children's song of the past, "Dosti Aisa Naata Jo Sone Se Bhi Mehnga".

She was a panel judge at the Obhartay Sitaray Competition in 2018 which was held by The Citizens Foundation.

On 23 July 2019, she performed at the EMI event which was held in honour of classical musicians and singers, especially in memory of Nisar Bazmi. The event was organised by sthe singer Tanveer Afridi and the director of public relations of EMI Pakistan.

On 28 November 2019, she performed at the Pakistan Mega Fashion Film and Art Award Show held at Flatties Hotel and organised by Israr Hussain.

On 15 November 2022, she participated in the Endowment Fund Trust for Preservation of the Heritage of Sindh to restore cultural heritage.

== Television shows ==
Year	Title	Role	Network
1975	Kaliyon Ki Mala	Herself	PTV
1983	Silver Jubilee	Herself	PTV
1993	Yes Sir, No Sir	Herself	PTV
2000	Ariel Mothers	Herself	PTV

== Popular songs ==
- "Dosti Aisa Naata" - music: Sohail Rana
- "Meray Bachpan kay Din" - with Mohammed Ali Shehki
- "Babula Way Lay Jaayen Na Loag Mujh Ko" - music: Niaz Ahmed
- "Dil Teri Haveli Hay" - with Akhlaq Ahmed
- "Bojhal Bojhal Palkon Par" - with Alamgir
- "Door Kahin Jheelon Se Koi" - music: Alamgir
