= Daddy (serial) =

Pakistani TV drama serial

- A promotional image of Daddy
- Genre: Family
- Written by: Ali Imran
- Directed by: Misbah Khalid
- Opening theme: Khoye Kahan by Nouman Javaid
- Country of origin: Pakistan
- Original language: Urdu
- No. of episodes: 13

Production
- Running time: 35 - 40 minutes (per episode)
- Production company: Six Sigma Productions

Original release
- Network: ARY Digital
- Release: 13 November 2010 – 5 February 2011

Daddy is a Pakistani drama serial which premiered on ARY Digital on 13 November 2010 and ended on 5 February the following year. Written by Ali Imran, and directed by Misbah Khalid, the serial is produced by Samina Humayun Saeed's production house Six Sigma Productions.

This was veteran actor Khayyam Sarhadi's last drama serial. He died before the last episode was aired, which was officially dedicated to the deceased actor.

== Cast and characters ==
=== Main cast ===
- Sajid Hasan as Jahanzeb
- Samiya Mumtaz as Anya
- Aimen Khan as Haiya
- Zeeshan Shah as Hassam
- Sardar Nadir as Bilal

=== Supporting cast ===
- Khayyam Sarhadi as Jahangir
- Zainab Qayyum as Maria
- Humayun Saeed as Sameer
- Sajjad Kishwar as Anya's father
- Parveen Malik as Anya's mother
- Aneesa Sheikh as Saima
- Niggi as Saima's mother

=== Notable guest stars ===
- Shamoon Abbasi as Walid

== Plot ==
Jahanzeb (Sajid Hasan) portrays the role of an ever-loving and ever-compromising father, who has been there for his children, when his wife Anya (Samia Mumtaz) left them for her self-progression. It all starts when Jahanzeb and Anya, who have been great friends since their days at art school, realise their feelings for each other and decide to get married. Anya has always been passionate for filmmaking and aspires to be a film director, but till now she had been suppressing her passion for the sake of her husband and their three children. However, one day she gets an opportunity to do a short course of 6 months from a film institute in India. Jahanzeb and his father, Jahangir (Khayyam Sarhadi) are supportive in the decision of taking up this opportunity and ultimately Anya leaves her children with Jahanzeb. After completing the course, Anya gets her first professional offer and this time she is not willing to go back home, which affects her children negatively throughout the series. Facing this kind of negligence at such a pivotal point of time, Jahanzeb decides to play the role of both the parents along with the help of his old friend Maria (Zainab Qayyum). When Anya eventually returns to Pakistan after a long time, she finds her children absolutely belong to their ‘Daddy’.

== Reception ==
=== Critical reception ===
A reviewer from The News International praised the series for its credible portrayal of teenage problems and its ability to appeal to both teenagers and their parents and highlighted the series as an example of a production that has successfully crossed the generational chasm and engaged viewers across different age groups.
