= Asad Malik =

Pakistani actor

- اسد ملک
- Born: 18 December 1970 (age 55); Karachi, Pakistan
- Occupations: Actor; Musician
- Years active: 1989–present

Asad Malik (Urdu, Punjabi: اسد ملک) is a Pakistani actor and musician. He gained fame in the 1990s and early 2000s through his projects as actor for PTV and NTM.

He started his career as a film actor in 1989 while his debut performance on television was the classic NTM drama Dasht in 1993. Since then, he has acted in over 300 TV dramas and 200 telefilms.

== Early life and education ==
Asad Malik was born in Karachi on 18 December 1970. Asad is the eldest of four siblings, with one brother who died in 2000; another settled in Lahore and a sister in Canada.

Asad completed his secondary education at the Crescent Model School, Lahore. Later, he earned a master’s degree in statistics from Punjab University and then moved to the United States, where he studied criminology. Initially aspiring to become a CSP officer, he changed his plans after observing the working conditions of newly appointed police officers. Asad also holds a PhD on the topic Performing Arts in the Light of the Holy Qur'an.

== Career ==
=== Acting ===
Following the conclusion of his higher education, Asad met veteran actor Abid Ali, who played a pivotal role in encouraging him to explore a career in acting. Ali suggested that he consider acting professionally, noting his potential for screen presence. Asad has described Abid Ali as a mentor figure during the early phase of his transition into the entertainment industry.

Asad began acting journey in 1989 with the horror film Pamela. He gained nationwide recognition in 1993 for his performance in the NTM drama serial Dasht, directed by Abid Ali. Known for playing diverse and often intense roles, he appeared in a variety of Urdu and Punjabi television dramas and films, including religious-themed projects.

=== Music ===
In recent years, Asad has expanded his artistic pursuits into music, focusing primarily on Sufi-inspired songs. His work in this genre includes Punjabi-language tracks such as Dil Bolley Allah Hu ("The Heart Proclaims: Allah Hu"), which he also produced and released in 2020 on his personal YouTube channel.

== Legal issues ==
=== Arrest for carrying unlicensed firearm (2018) ===
On 12 November 2018, Asad was arrested by the Airport Security Force (ASF) at Allama Iqbal International Airport in Lahore for carrying an automatic firearm with an expired license. After the weapon was discovered during a security check, Asad was taken into custody. The following day, a court granted him bail, against Rs 50,000 surety.

== Selected filmography ==
=== Television series ===
Year	Title	Role	Channel
1993	Dasht	Mir Bebarg Mehdi	NTM
1998	Jaane Anjaane	Saad Fareedi	PTV Home
1999	Mario	Mario	PTV Home
1999	Kaghaz	Aamir	PTV Home
1999	Ghareeb-e-Shehar	Kashif	PTV Home
2000	Aansoo	Saram	PTV Home
2000	Aan	Ali Badr-ud-Din	PTV Home
2000–01	Justuju	Irfan	PTV Home
2004–05	Moorat	Police Officer Majeed	ARY Digital
2006	Manzil	Yawar Khan	ARY Digital
2006	Chashman	Shahgul	Aaj TV
2010	Hawa Rait Aur Angan	Haris	PTV Home
2011	Zip....Bus Chup Raho	Manzoor Hussain	Geo Entertainment
2011–12	Maat	Aazar	Hum TV
2013	Hisar E Ishq	Jahanzaib Hakim Ali	Urdu 1
2016	Dhaani	Rehan Seth	Geo Entertainment
2017	Khan	SP Zaman	Geo Entertainment
2017	Meherbaan	Shah Nawaz	A‑Plus Entertainment
2024	Fanaa	Atta Baksh	Green Entertainment
2025	Laadli	Ishaq Khanzada	Hum TV

=== Films ===
Year	Title	Role	Language	Notes
1990	Qayamat ke Baad	Prince	Punjabi	Leading role, written by Syed Noor
1991	Betaab	Sanwal	Punjabi	Leading role, co-starring Nauman Ijaz
1992	Ishq Rehna Sada	Zeeshan "Shanu"	Urdu	Leading role
2016	Saya e Khuda e Zuljalal	Major Shafqat Baloch	Urdu	Ensemble cast, ISPR production
