= Khayyam Sarhadi =

Pakistani actor

- خیام سرحدی
- Born: 12 June 1948; Bombay, India
- Died: 3 February 2011 (aged 62); Lahore, Punjab, Pakistan
- Occupations: Actor, Television personality, Radio personality
- Spouse(s): Saiqa (wife till his death); Atiya Sharaf (divorced)
- Children: 4 daughters
- Parent(s): Zia Sarhadi (father); Zahira Ghaznavi (mother)
- Relatives: Rafiq Ghaznavi (grandfather); Zhalay Sarhadi (niece)
- Awards: Pride of Performance Award by the President of Pakistan in 1991

Khayyam Sarhadi (12 June 1948 – 3 February 2011; born as Khayyam Sethi) was a Pakistani film and television actor and a radio personality.

== Early life and education ==
Khayyam Sarhadi was born to a Muslim family on 12 June 1948 in Bombay, in the home of parents Zia Sarhadi and Zahira Ghaznavi and grew up there. Later he moved to Pakistan and stayed in Karachi for some time before moving to Lahore.

His maternal grandfather, Rafiq Ghaznavi, was a well-known musician and since both his parents were writers, he was into showbiz from an early age. Khayyam travelled to the United States where he got his master's degree in cinematography, following which he travelled through Europe making documentaries. He also had a master's degree in English literature and Fine Arts.

== Personal life ==
Khayyam Sarhadi was married to TV actress Atiya Sharaf. Later, the couple divorced and he married film actress Saiqa. He had four daughters.

Model and actress Zhalay Sarhadi is his niece.

== Career ==
In the 1970s, after the death of his mother, Khayyam Sarhadi returned to Pakistan. In Pakistan, Sarhadi started his career from acting and directing theatre plays and later started working in TV dramas with Pakistan Television Corporation (PTV) where he was spotted and picked up by noted PTV producer Yawar Hayat Khan. Since then he had worked in hundreds of TV dramas and also directed a few of them. He also worked in some films. His scripts were made in Roman letters because he couldn't read Urdu well.

== Death and legacy ==
Khayyam Sarhadi died of a sudden heart attack during the shooting of a TV drama serial on 3 February 2011 at the age of 62 in Lahore. His funeral was held at his residence in Defence Housing Authority, Lahore.

After his death, veteran Pakistani actor/director Jawed Sheikh paid tributes to him by saying that he had worked together with him and remembers Sarhadi as a versatile actor and fun to be with.

== Selected filmography ==
=== Films ===
Year	Title	Role	Language	Notes
1980	The Blood of Hussain	Policeman	English	Film debut
1981	Manzil		Urdu	Supporting role
1981	Qurbani		Urdu	Guest appearance
1998	Jinnah	Sardar Abdul Rab Nishtar	English	Supporting role
2011	Bol	Suleiman Dogar	Urdu	Supporting role

=== Television series ===
Year	Title	Role	Channel	Ref
1982	Laazawal		PTV	
1986	Sooraj Kay Saath Saath		PTV	
1989	Neelay Hath	Rashid	PTV	
1990	Mann Chalay Ka Sauda	Irshad	PTV	
1994	Angar Wadi	Maulvi Mushtaq	PTV	
1998	Ghulam Gardish		PTV	
2006	Makan	Nawaz Ali	Geo TV	
2006	Manzil	Sajjad Khan	ARY TV	
2006	Taqdeer		PTV Home	
2009	Meri Zaat Zarra-e-Benishan	Qasim Abbas	Geo TV	
2010	Dastaan	Jameela's husband	Hum TV	
2010	Parsa	Irfan	Hum TV	
2010	Dil-e-Abad		Hum TV	
2011	Anokha Ladla	Mamdu	PTV Home	

== Awards ==
- Pride of Performance Award (1991) from the President of Pakistan
- Nigar Award
- PTV National Award
