= Qaiser Naqvi =

Pakistani actress

- قیصر نقوی
- Born: 8 December 1958 (age 67); Karachi, Pakistan
- Education: University of Karachi
- Occupations: Actress; radio artist; radio presenter
- Years active: 1970–present
- Children: 4

Qaiser Naqvi (Urdu: قیصر نقوی) is a Pakistani actress. She is known for her roles in dramas Main Chand Si, Humsafar, Shikwa and Ek Tamanna Lahasil Si.

== Early life ==
Qaiser was born in 1958 on 8 December in Karachi, Pakistan. She completed her studies from University of Karachi. She started working at Radio Pakistan in Lahore in 1970 and also worked as a radio presenter.

== Career ==
She made her debut as an actress on PTV in 1973. She was noted for her roles in the dramas Intezar Farmaiye, Sassi, Tapish, Mera Nam Hai Muhabbat, Chhoti Si Duniya and Uljhan. She also appeared in dramas Kaash Main Teri Beti Na Hoti, Moorat, Ahmed Habib Ki Betiyan, Riyasat, Tootay Huway Per and Omer Dadi Aur Gharwale. Since then, she has appeared in dramas Humnasheen, Meri Ladli, Iqraar, Bhai, Shikwa, Kaanch Ki Guriya and Hari Hari Churiyaan. In 2015, she appeared in the movie Manto and has also appeared in telefilms.

== Personal life ==
Her husband died in the late 1970s. She has four daughters. Actor Samar Abbas Jaffri is her great-grandson.

== Filmography ==
=== Television ===
Year	Title	Role	Network
1972	Uncle Urfi	Beena's mother	PTV
1976	Intezar Farmaiye	Haseena's mother	PTV
1980	Bahadar Ali	Shazia	PTV
1981	Afshan	Chand Bibi	PTV
1985	Guriya	Zahra	PTV
1985	Deewarain	Hashim's mother	PTV
1986	Jungle	Sukhan	PTV
1989	Tapish	Sarah's mother	PTV
1989	Hawwa Ki Beeti	Rehana	PTV
1991	Eid Clowning	Afia's mother	PTV
1992	Aanch	Nafisa	PTV
1992	Bakh	Abdullah's mother	PTV
1993	Nangey Paon	Neni's mother	PTV
1993	Mera Nam Hai Muhabbat	Zubra	PTV
1994	Chhoti Si Duniya	Hakima	PTV
1995	Aik Thi Mehroo	Azbano	PTV
1995	Chand Grehan	Dai	PTV
1996	The Aanch Show	Herself	PTV
1996	Aik Thi Mehro	Mehru's mother	PTV
1997	Zahar Baad	Meera	PTV
1998	Saas Ki Aas	Iffat's mother	PTV
1998	Uljhan	Amma	PTV
1998	Passe Ayena Gurda Choor	Shahid's mother	PTV
1999	Saibaan	Sara's mother	PTV
1999	Wo Ayain Hain Ghar Hamaray	Sarwat	PTV
2000	Zaib-un-Nisa	Mrs. Khan	PTV
2002	Panchi	Saeeda's mother	PTV
2004	Sassi	Suriya	PTV
2004	Moorat	Bitto Khala	ARY Digital
2005	Beti	Dadu	PTV
2005	Riyasat	Shaini's mother	ARY Digital
2006	Ghar Damad	Zahida	Hum TV
2007	Gulabi Saari	Amna	PTV
2007	Thori Door Sath Chalo	Sabo Begum	Hum TV
2008	Chan Masaat	Sherbano	PTV
2009	Taxi Driver : Lamhay	Mehmona	PTV
2009	Shahzadi	Kulsoom	ARY Digital
2009	Nadaaniyaan	Yasir's mother	Geo Entertainment
2009	Nindiya Kiun Jalti Jaye	Maham	TV One
2010	Dil-e-Abad	Nasreen	Hum TV
2010	Thori Si Wafa Chahiye	Dadi	Geo TV
2010	Aik Aurat Ki Kahani	Shabana	PTV
2010	Perfume Chowk	Roshana	Hum TV
2010	Ijazat	Safia Begum	ARY Digital
2010	Shehre Dil Key Darwazay	Sofiyan's aunt	ARY Digital
2010	Chunri	Sundus	PTV
2011	Khawab Nagar	Ammi Jan	PTV
2011	Zaib-un-Nisa	Samina's mother	PTV
2011	Pul Sirat	Sunny's mother	ARY Digital
2011	Roag	Humaira's mother	ARY Digital
2011	Main Chand Si	Huma	ARY Digital
2011	Tootay Huway Per	Dadi	Geo TV
2011	Kaala Jadu	Shireen's mother	ARY Digital
2011	Omer Dadi Aur Gharwale	Yasir's mother	ARY Digital
2011	Kitni Girhain Baaki Hain	Amma Gi	Hum TV
2011	Humsafar	Batool Bano	Hum TV
2011	Kaash Main Teri Beti Na Hoti	Zubaida	Geo TV
2012	Ek Tamanna Lahasil Si	Rukiya	Hum TV
2012	Ahmed Habib Ki Betiyan	Sarah's mother	Hum TV
2012	Sabz Qadam	Ana Bi	ARY Digital
2012	Roshan Sitara	Neelum's mother	Hum TV
2012	Khushi Ek Roag	Khursheed	ARY Digital
2012	Maa Aur Mamta	Tamana	PTV
2012	Meri Ladli	Ahsan's mother	ARY Digital
2012	Sasural Ke Rang Anokhay	Shaista	Geo Entertainment
2013	Meenu Ka Susral	Fashi's mother	ARY Digital
2013	Chaar Chand	Amma Bibi	Geo TV
2013	Matam	Sheikh's wife	ARY Digital
2013	Humnasheen	Mehrunisa's mother	Hum TV
2013	Darmiyan	Aliya's mother	ARY Digital
2013	Pachtawa	Taj Bi	ARY Digital
2014	Babul Ki Duayen Leti Ja	Tai Ami	ARY Digital
2014	Gumaan	Hamad's mother	Express Entertainment
2014	Iqraar	Naila's mother	Geo TV
2014	Shikwa	Saqib's Aapa	ARY Digital
2015	Ghar Aik Jannat	Naeema	Geo TV
2015	Khuda Dekh Raha Hai	Aapa Jan	A-Plus
2015	Dil Hi Tou Ha	Nusrat	Express Entertainment
2015	Kaanch Ki Guriya	Saliha's mother	Geo TV
2016	Bhai	Aapa	A-Plus
2017	Hari Hari Churiyaan	Guddi's mother	Geo Entertainment
2017	Manto	Safia's mother	Geo TV
2018	Geo Subah Pakistan	Herself	Geo TV
2019	Satarangi	Herself	Express Entertainment
2020	Advance Ortho & Herbal Center	Herself	Geo TV

=== Telefilm ===
Year	Title	Role
1992	Eid Ground Floor Per	Erum's mother
1993	Aaseb	Razia
2007	Gardish	Noushaba
2008	Meray Mohallay Ki Larki	Khala
2008	Mutthi Bhar Mitti	Amma Ji
2012	Chimgadar	Talib's mother
2013	Dunk	Aapa
2013	Amtul Ki Gali	Amtul's mother
2014	Cousin Sara	Dadi
2014	Senti Mental	Anwar's mother

=== Film ===
Year	Title	Role
2004	Way to Hope	Shafiq's mother
2005	Fareb-e-Tabassum	Salma
2007	Dually Wed	Rafiq's mother
2014	Kuch Alag Si Kahani	Ghazala's mother
2015	Manto	Sardar Begum

== Awards and nominations ==
Year	Award	Category	Result	Tile	Ref.
2013	1st Hum Awards	Hum Honorary Phenomenal Serial Award	Won	Humsafar	
