= Darmiyaan (TV series) =

Pakistani television series

- Urdu: درمیان
- Written by: Emran Hussain
- Directed by: Shahid Shafaat
- Starring: Sania Saeed; Adnan Siddiqui; Syra Yousuf; Javeria Abbasi
- Opening theme: Nabeel Shaukat Ali
- Country of origin: Pakistan
- Original language: Urdu
- No. of episodes: 20

Production
- Camera setup: Multi-camera

Original release
- Network: ARY Digital
- Release: 14 August 2013 – 4 January 2014

Darmiyaan is a 2013 Pakistani television series directed by Shahid Shafaat. It aired on ARY Digital and stars Sania Saeed, Adnan Siddiqui and Syra Yousuf in leading roles. It broadcast in India on Zindagi.

== Synopsis ==
The plot of the series follows the story of two sisters when the young one seeks out to take revenge from the elder. She tries to manipulate her life after which she not only loses the man of her dreams but also her sense of reality. It also revolves around the upside downs in the life of a married couple.

== Plot ==
Farishtay belongs to a lower middle-class background from a low-income settlement of Karachi, and runs a beauty parlour to earn a living for her family, comprising her mother and half-sister Aliya. At the marriage ceremony of one of her friends, Farishtay catches the attention of Raheel, who falls for her and sends a proposal to her. Initially hesitant to marry, Farishtay later agrees due to Raheel's affection. However, he gets insecure at times, even due to slight misunderstandings and lack of trust in her. Eventually, their relationship ends, and Farishtay is forced by neighbours to leave the house along with her family. The family finds nowhere to live, leaving Farishtay to lose her senses.

Fifteen years pass, and the grown-up Aliya is destined to take revenge for her family's destruction. She visits her mentally disturbed sister, Farishtay, in the hospital and kidnaps Raheel's son, Hassan, just to return him to them to win the trust of his family. She disguises herself as Alina and joins his house as the caretaker of his children, and his wife, Nida, supports her at every moment, as she had met her with her son. She tries to create rifts between Nida and Raheel at every moment by creating problems in their lives. She wins over all the family members except Raheel, who doubts her intentions.

Nida leaves for Lahore, the hometown of her friend, Sadia, to attend her wedding, and during this time, Aliya gets the chance to lure Raheel towards her. She succeeds in it, and Nida decides to return instantly when she finds a change in Raheel's behaviour towards her and Aliya. Upon reaching her house, Nida assumes that Aliya wants to get Raheel from her. The closeness of Aliya and Raheel creates everyday conflicts between him and Nida. She even asks him to make Aliya leave the job, but he refuses. Nida then decides to share the matter with her mother-in-law, Hameeda, but then avoids giving her any shock due to her health.

Aliya manipulates the situation and makes her fall from grace in Hameeda's eyes, who catches Nida with her friend, Aamir, in a locked room in the absence of Raheel and children. Nida's daughter, Hania, catches Raheel and Aliya while hugging and tries to tell Hameeda about Aliya's motives, but she shuts her up. Nida too tries the same, but she doesn't believe her due to the incident. However, one night, she herself observes Raheel while leaving Aliya's room and learns the whole situation. Depressed by the shock and having no asthma pump, which was removed by Aliya, Hameeda's health deteriorates, and she dies due to asthma complications.

Raheel blames Nida's carelessness for this, leading to conflict between them. She decides to leave the house along with the children, but Raheel stops the children. She leaves with them and settles at Sadia's house. After Nida's departure, Aliya becomes rude to the children. She scolds them at every matter and doesn't let them talk to their mother on the phone. One day, the children ran out of the house to meet their mother. Nida keeps them with her, and Raheel asks her to give the children to him. However, she refuses and informs him about her decision to divorce him.

The following day, Raheel receives the divorce notice from her. He is terminated from his job too due to his weak performance. Alone in his house with Aliya, he shares these tensions with her. Nida struggles to get the custody of her children. The couple encounters in the court for the finalisation of their divorce, where Raheel changes his decision and doesn't sign the papers. On reaching home, he confesses to Aliya that he doesn't want to repeat what he did earlier. He reveals that he had a burden on him as he waited and tried so much to find Farishtay but couldn't. There, Aliya feels guilty, as she made his life miserable despite his efforts and guilt.

She takes him to the hospital to meet Farishtay, who was in her senses and better than earlier. At his request, she apologises to him. Aliya calls Nida there and apologises to her. Farishtay requests Nida to reconcile with Raheel for the sake of their children, and she agrees. After Farishtay gets discharged, Nida and Raheel take both the sisters to their house, where Nida gives a ring to Farishtay that Raheel had purchased for her fifteen years ago. Both the sisters leave for their house, and the couple begin their new beginning with their children.

== Cast ==
- Sania Saeed as Nida
- Adnan Siddiqui as Raheel
- Syra Yousuf as Aliya, disguised as Alina
  - Arisha Razi as Aliya (young)
- Javeria Abbasi as Farishtay
- Sajida Syed as Hameeda, Raheel's mother
- Kaif Ghaznavi as Sadia
- Humaira Ali as Najma, Farishtay's mother
- Qaiser Naqvi as Kulsoom
- Faisal Naqvi as landlord
