= Inteha (1999 film) =

- Directed by: Samina Peerzada
- Written by: Dennis Issaq
- Produced by: Samina Peerzada Productions
- Starring: Humayun Saeed; Meera; Zeeshan Sikander; Resham
- Distributed by: Mandviwalla Entertainment
- Release date: 26 February 1999
- Running time: 165 minutes
- Country: Pakistan
- Language: Urdu

Inteha (Urdu: انتہا) is a Pakistani Urdu film which was released in 1999 across theaters in Pakistan. The film was Samina Peerzada's directorial debut and established the careers of its two leading men Humayun Saeed and Zeeshan Sikander, both of whom made their cinematic debut in the film alongside Meera.

The film was entered in the Kara Film Festival in 2001.

== Synopsis ==
Inteha is the story of Sara (Meera), a young woman from a well-off background, studying at a liberal arts college. Being the introverted sort and romantically inclined, she's a dreamer. With a dad who dotes on his daughter, and a pacifist boyfriend (Zeeshan Sikanadar), life just couldn't get any better for her. This all is shattered when circumstances force her to marry her feudal cousin (Humayun Saeed as Zafar). She finds her new home troublesome.

== Cast ==
- Meera as Sara
- Humayun Saeed as Zafar
- Zeeshan Sikander as Farrukh
- Resham as Sheena
- Arbaaz Ali Khan
- Naddam

== Film's reception ==
The film's plot dealt with the issue of marital rape and a few shots detailing the ordeal the lead character goes through, stirred much controversy when Inteha was released during the first half of 1999. As a result, the movie was banned for a few days but was re-released after Peerzada managed to get a stay order from the court. It was a successful movie at the major urban centers in Pakistan and had a good run at Karachi's Nishat theater.

== Soundtrack ==
Inteha's soundtrack composed by Amjad Bobby was much appreciated. Hit tracks included:

- "Kahan tha yeh haseen chehra"
- "Ae meri aarzoo"
- "Humney aisi bhi kya khata kardee"
- "Teri Naraz Nazar"
- "Sun geet naya"
