= Abdullah Kadwani =

Pakistani actor, producer and director

- عبدالله کادوانی
- Born: 8 August 1968 (age 58); Karachi, Pakistan
- Occupations: Actor, producer, GMD Geo Entertainment/Geo TV, Co-founder 7th Sky Entertainment
- Known for: Producing drama serials and films
- Website: 7thsky.biz

Abdullah Kadwani (Urdu: عبدالله کادوانی) is a Pakistani actor, producer, and director.

As of 2019, he holds the position of group managing director at Geo Entertainment, a leading television network in Pakistan. He is currently responsible for "Geo Entertainment Holdings of TV channels: Geo Films, Geo Kahani, Fire Records, and all Geo Entertainment properties."

A Daily Times article reported that Abdullah Kadwani was among the esteemed panel of judges from around the world for the prestigious Rose d'OR Awards.

As an actor, director and producer, Kadwani has an experience of more than 25 years in the film and TV industry of Pakistan. He has produced and created several popular award-winning drama serials, including Meri Zaat Zarra e Benishan (2009), Daam (2010), Doraha (2008), Shehr e Zaat (2012), Khaani (2017), Khuda Aur Mohabbat (season 3) (2021) and Tere Bin (2022).

== Career ==
=== Fashion model and actor ===
In an interview with Dawn, Abdullah Kadwani mentions his early days as a model, as he remained among the top models in the country during the 1990s, having more than 25 television commercials to his credit. He would then act on television, mostly during the 1990s.

=== Producer ===
Kadwani formed 7th Sky Entertainment, a premier broadcast and film entertainment company in 2004. In 2020 it was reported that under the leadership of Abdullah Kadwani and Asad Qureshi, 7th Sky Entertainment had produced over 130 projects in a span of 16 years.

== Selected filmography ==
=== Actor ===
==== Television series ====
| Year | Title | Role | Network | Notes |
|---|---|---|---|---|
| 1991 | Guest House | Shakeel | PTV | |
| 1994 | Baray Baray Dhai Baray | Jamal | PTV | |
| 1995 | Chand Grehan | Amjad | STN | |
| 1995 | Hawain | Aleem | PTV | |
| 1996 | Aik Raat Aik Kahani | Waseem | PTV | |
| 1997 | Panchwan Mausam | Asim | PTV | |
| 1999 | Andheray Dareechay | Jawad | STN | Also the director |
| 1999 | Doosri Aurat | Saif | PTV | |

==== Telefilms ====
| Year | Title | Role | Network | Notes |
|---|---|---|---|---|
| 1993 | Special Eid Flight | Passenger | PTV | Supporting role |
| 1994 | Adam Hawa aur Shaitan | Muzammil | PTV | Supporting role |
| 1995 | Gul Phenke Hain | Manzar | PTV | Supporting role |
| 2009 | Flirting Ke Side Effects | Sameer | Geo Entertainment | Lead role in a comedy-drama |
| 2010 | Pyaar Mein Twist | Vicky | ARY Digital | Lead role in a comedy-drama |

=== Producer ===
==== Television series ====
| Year | Title | Ref |
|---|---|---|
| 2004 | Ana | |
| 2004 | Moorat | |
| 2005 | Shiddat | |
| 2005 | Dost | |
| 2006 | Makan | |
| 2006 | Manzil | |
| 2006 | Riyasat | |
| 2007 | Wilco | |
| 2007 | Jaal | |
| 2007 | Sarkar Sahab | |
| 2008 | Doraha | |
| 2009 | Meri Zaat Zarra-e-Benishan | |
| 2010 | Omer Dadi Aur Gharwale | |
| 2010 | Daam | |
| 2011 | Zindagi Dhoop Tum Ghana Saya | |
| 2012 | Shehr-e-Zaat | |
| 2012 | Ashk | |
| 2016 | Tum Kon Piya | |
| 2016 | Noor-e-Zindagi | |
| 2017 | Yaar-e-Bewafa | |
| 2017 | Mohabbat Tumse Nafrat Hai | |
| 2017 | Khaani | |
| 2018 | Naulakha | |
| 2019 | Mere Mohsin | |
| 2019 | Kahin Deep Jaley | |
| 2020 | Uraan | |
| 2020 | Fitrat | |
| 2020 | Deewangi | |
| 2021 | Khuda Aur Mohabbat (season 3) | |
| 2022 | Chauraha | |
| 2022 | Aye Musht-e-Khaak | |
| 2022 | Tere Bin | |
| 2023 | Khumar | |
| 2023 | Heer Da Hero | |
| 2023 | Jannat Se Aagay | |
| 2023 | Mannat Murad | |
| 2024 | Khaie | |
| 2024 | Yahya | |
| 2025 | Sanwal Yaar Piya | |
| 2025 | Case No. 9 | |
| 2026 | Shaidai | |
| 2026 | Nashtar | |

==== Telefilms ====
| Year | Title | Ref |
|---|---|---|
| 2020 | Dil Tera Hogaya | |
| 2021 | Zoya Ne Haan Kardi | |
| 2021 | Filmy Siyappa | |
| 2021 | Teri Meri Kahani | |
| 2022 | Ruposh | |

==== Films ====
| Year | Title | Ref |
|---|---|---|
| 2013 | Chambaili | |
| 2013 | Armaan | |

== See also ==
- List of Lollywood actors
