= Sarkar Sahab =

- Poster for the series
- Also known as: Evicted Lord
- Genre: Drama; Romance
- Written by: Seema Ghazal
- Directed by: Kamran Qureshi; Iram Qureshi
- Starring: Asif Raza Mir; Imran Abbas; Nirma; Kashif Mehmood; Zainab Qayyum; Deeba; Madiha Iftikhar; Nayyar Ejaz; Sonu Ali
- Theme music composer: Waqar Ali
- Opening theme: "Dhola" by Maham
- Composer: Ali Johar
- Country of origin: Pakistan
- Original language: Urdu
- No. of episodes: 29

Production
- Producers: Humayun Saeed; Abdullah Kadwani
- Production locations: Dubai and Sharjah UAE; Karachi and Bahawalpur, Pakistan
- Cinematography: Mirza Mehmood
- Editor: Imran Wai Qureshi
- Running time: 45 minutes
- Production company: 7th Sky Entertainment

Original release
- Network: ARY Digital
- Release: 2007

Sarkar Sahab (Urdu: سركار صاحب) was a 2007 Pakistani TV serial based on the culture of the Cholistan Desert and modern Dubai. The serial is directed by Kamran Qureshi & Iram Qureshi, written by Seema Ghazal and produced by Humayun Saeed & Abdullah Kadwani's production house 7th Sky Entertainment.

The serial was shot in Noor Mahal (palace) and Darbar Mahal (Palace) of Bahawalpur, Derawar Fort, Chanan Peer shrine and Khanqah Sharif shrine, depicting the old cultural values and family traditions. The English title of the serial is Evicted Lord and it was broadcast on ARY TV. It is a story of a family that is divided through contradictions, expectations and traditions. The show was also aired on Star One in India .

== Plot ==
Sarkar Sahab (Asif Raza Mir) is very positive and soft-spoken noble feudal lord living in a palace in Cholistan with his wife Shahi (Deeba) and two sons, Habeel (Kashif Mehmood) and Balaaj (Imran Abbas). Sarkar Sahab's younger brother Mir Alam (Nayyar Ejaz) and his wife Surayya (Fariha Akbar) have two daughters and don't have any son.

Qudsia, the elder daughter of Mir Alam, is married to Habeel. Doctors tells her that she will not be able to conceive. Now Shahi wants Habeel to remarry to have a child. Zena (Madiha Iftikhar), younger daughter of Mir Alam, is an energetic and lively girl. She loves Balaaj since her childhood. Balaaj is studying abroad and there he falls in love with another girl Salina (Zainab Qayyum).

Gul Ara (Nirma) was a professional dancer who was invited from Karachi to perform in a Sarkar's family event and her mother traps Sarkar Sahab in a situation that he has to marry Gul Ara. Shahi asks him to leave the palace and Habeel with the help of Mir Alam takes over all the business affairs.

Balaaj marries Salina in Dubai and here Shahi fixes his wedding date in Bahawalpur. He is called a day before wedding to give him surprise by showing an emergency over the phone that his mother is critically ill. On arrival Balaaj refuses to marry and informs Zena that he is already married. Zena begs him to do it as a paper marriage, just to show people and make the family happy.

Salena gets pregnant and gives birth to a baby boy. She phones Bhawalpur to let Balaj know this happy news when Gul Ara answers and helps her financially in the absence of Balaj and also helps to come to Bahawalpur. Mir Habeel and Balaaj malign Gul Ara and convince Sarkar Sahab by showing documents that she is doing fraud by slowly selling all the property to get her thrown out of home.

Shahi accepts Sarkar Sahab back in palace. Salina goes to palace and entire family gets shocked. Salina's son is accepted as heir. Shahi brings Gul Ara in palace to live together after proving her innocence by Sarkar's trustworthy staff member Saim Ali (Faiq Khan).

== Cast ==
=== Main cast ===
- Asif Raza Mir as Mir Sarkar Sahab
- Imran Abbas as Mir Balaaj
- Kashif Mehmood as Mir Habeel
- Nirma as Gul Aara
- Zainab Qayyum as Salina
- Deeba as Shahi
- Madiha Iftikhar as Zena
- Nayyar Ejaz as Mir Alam Sahab
- Fareeha Jabeen as Surayya
- Sonu Ali as Qudsia

=== Supporting cast ===
- Faiq Khan as Saim Ali
- Parveen Akbar as Rani Bi
- Raju Jamil as UAE Sheikh
- Tanveer Sadiq as Waqar
- Tabbasum Arif as Waqar's Wife
- Saleem Miraj as Mitho
- Gul as Salina's Friend
- Amjad Shani as Mr. Junaid
- Asifa Naureen as Jannat
- Nain Shehzadi as Jewna
- Kanwal Malik as Imamzadi
- Majid Moon as Afzal Khan
- Tahira Khan as Afzal's Wife
- Raheela Malik as Doctor
- Dr. Ajmal Malik as Police Officer
- Nighat Sultana as Manu's Mother
- Qamar Anjum as Sarkar's Driver

== Soundtrack ==
External videos
- A promotional video of Sarkar Sahab

There are four situational songs in this serial. Qawwali and music videos were recorded especially on original locations to keep the right atmosphere, showing mud houses in desert, Shrine, Cholistani dresses, camels, cows etc. Three songs were composed by Waqar Ali and lyricists was M Nasir & Ali Moin. Nirma has two performances in it and choreographed by Sonu Dangerous with his team.

Track listing
No.	Title	Singer(s)	Length
1.	"Jhangar"	Fariha Pervez	3:45
2.	"Dhola"	Maham	3:10
3.	"Chak Day (music inspired by Kailash Kher)"	Arif Ali	2:36
4.	"Pehli Bar Yun"	Farhad Kahayat	3:21

== Reception ==
Fouzia Mapara of the DAWN Images praised the production quality of the series but criticised its finale for being unsatisfying and handling of plot twists, particularly the introduction of a second wife, as overly lenient.

== Awards and nominations ==
Year	Awards	Category	Recipient/ nominee	Result	Ref.
2009	Lux Style Awards	Best TV Serial	Humayun Saeed, Abdullah Kadwani	Nominated	
2009	Lux Style Awards	Best TV Actor	Asif Raza Mir	Nominated	
2009	Lux Style Awards	Best TV Director	Kamran Qureshi	Nominated	
