= Riyasat (TV series) =

Pakistani television series

- DVD cover
- Also known as: Kingdom of Hearts
- Genre: Drama
- Written by: Asghar Nadeem Syed
- Directed by: Kamran Qureshi
- Creative director: Asma Akber
- Starring: Nadeem Baig, Talat Hussain, Humayun Saeed, Rashid Mehmood, Maria Wasti, Ismat Zaidi, Maira Khan and Adnan Jilani
- Theme music composer: Waqar Ali
- Composer: Akhtar Qayyum
- Country of origin: Pakistan
- Original language: Urdu
- No. of episodes: 26

Production
- Executive producers: Rafiq Nasar and Samina Humayun Saeed
- Producers: Humayun Saeed; Abdullah Kadwani; Aslam Bhatti
- Production locations: Dubai, Sharjah and Pakistan
- Cinematography: Syed Naeem Rizvi
- Editor: Faisal Gulzar
- Running time: 40 min each
- Production companies: 7th Sky Entertainment; Channel 2001

Original release
- Network: ARY Digital Network
- Release: 2005 – 2005

Riyasat (Urdu: رياست) is a Pakistani TV serial aired in 2005, written by Asghar Nadeem Syed and directed by Kamran Qureshi. A true story of love revolves around lives of people from two different societies, today's modern Dubai and a small seaside village. A tale that covers drugs and gold smuggling, human trafficking and evasion from the law.

== Plot ==
Qadir Jogi, (Talat Hussain), a fisherman involved in human trafficking and gold smuggling, becomes enemy of Shahnawaz Khan (Nadeem Baig), the owner of a small shipping company when he refuses to help Qadir in smuggling. The enmity reaches to the next generation, Nadir (Adnan Jilani) and Ahmed Nawaz Khan (Humayun Saeed) which starts from business competition and reaches to a woman, Sherry (Zainab Qayyum) who marries Ahmed Nawaz. The enmity of Qadir Jogi results in losses of Shahnawaz's young daughter, and then his honest army man son-in-laws life.

Taking Seth Moosa Karim's help, Shahnawaz succeeds in getting Qadir Jogi deported from Dubai. In return, Qadir gets Shahnawaz killed in a plane crash. Qadir's own son Nadir, dies afterwards in a car accident during the hospitality of a Swiss Princess. Qadir Jogi, who tried to kill Shahnawaz's son twice, was left alone after the accidental death of his only son Nadir.

== Cast ==
=== Main cast ===
- Nadeem Baig as Shahnawaz Khan (Shipping Businessman)
- Talat Hussain as Qadir Jogi (Smuggler)
- Humayun Saeed as Ahmed Nawaz
- Zainab Qayyum as Sheri
- Maria Wasti as Ayesha
- Sara Loren as Aamna
- Deeba as Shahnawaz Wife
- Rashid Mehmood as Ghani
- Maira Khan as Shani
- Adnan Jilani as Nadir
- Kunwar Nafees as Captain Shehraz

=== Recurring cast ===
- Ismat Zaidi as Captain Sheraz's Mother
- Rashid Farooqui as Fareed
- Silvia as Princess
- Paul as British Ambassador
- Dr Ausaf Khan as Jewish businessman
- Akbar Subhani as Shani's Father
- Shan as Naveed
- Imtiaz Taj as Khalqa
- Aslam Sheikh as Malqa
- Parveen Akbar as Ayesha's Mother
- Qaiser Naqvi as Shaini's Mother
- Shahzad Ali Khan as Seth Moosa Kareem
- Hareem Qureshi as Shanzabe
- Nighat Sultana as Bachai

== Soundtrack ==
The theme song Riyasat Hai Riyasat was composed by Waqar Ali and sung by Sonu Nigam. The music video was recorded in India and released in December 2005.

== Awards and nominations ==
5th Lux Style Awards

- Won - Best TV Serail (Satellite) (2006)
- Won - Best TV Actress (Satellite) (2006) – Maria Wasti
- Nominated - Best TV Actor (Satellite) (2006) – Talat Hussain.
- Nominated - Best TV Director (Satellite) (2006) – Kamran Qureshi.
