= Humayun Saeed =

Pakistani actor and film producer (born 1971)

Humayun Saeed Ansari
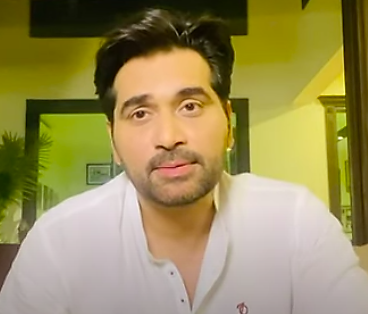
- Born: Humayun Saeed; 27 July 1971 (age 55); Karachi, Sindh, Pakistan
- Occupation: Actor • producer
- Years active: 1995–present
- Height: 1.84 m (6 ft 0 in)
- Spouse: Samina Humayun Saeed (m. 1995)
- Awards: (Awards)

Humayun Saeed (born 27 July 1971) is a Pakistani actor and producer. Describing himself as a method actor, Saeed is primarily known for his work on Pakistani television and cinema and is the recipient of several accolades, including Lux Style Awards and ARY Film Awards. Saeed also runs the Six Sigma Plus media production house which produces television drama serials and commercial movies.

== Early life and family ==
Saeed was born on 27 July 1971 in Karachi into a Punjabi family.

He earned a bachelor's degree in commerce from St. Patrick's College, Karachi and before entering the entertainment industry he used to work as a general manager at a garment factory.

Saeed has four younger brothers, with Salman Saeed also being an actor.

== Career ==
=== Television ===
Saeed began his career as a television producer in the early 90s. After stepping into showbiz, Saeed's was cast in the TV shows for acting roles. He made his acting debut in 1995 with Karoron Ka Aadmi produced by Nadeem A Khan.

Saeed continued doing TV productions. He partnered with Sultana Siddiqui in the late 90s and then Abdullah Kadwani in 2000s for 7th Sky Entertainment. Later, he started his own production house along with Shehzad Nasib under the banner Six Sigma Plus. Since then he has produced content for Pakistani television viewers.

Saeed's initial TV work as an actor includes Mehndi, Doraha, Kabhi Kabhi Pyar Mein, Kaafir, Uraan, Hum Se Juda Na Hona, Ladies Park and guest roles in Meri Zaat Zarra-e-Benishan and Daam. In 2005, Saeed starred in the music video Iss Baar Milo.

In January 2022, Saeed was cast as Dr. Hasnat Khan (known for his romantic involvement with Princess Diana), in the fifth season of The Crown.

=== Films ===
Saeed made his film debut in 1999 with Samina Peerzada's movie Inteha, in which he played a negative role. For his performance, he receive the National Award for Best Actor. Owing to the decline of the Pakistani film industry at that time, he appeared in only a limited number of films until the revival of cinema in 2013. Since then, he has appeared in many films, including Main Hoon Shahid Afridi, Bin Roye, Jawani Phir Nahi Ani and Punjab Nahi Jaungi. In 2018, he starred in Jawani Phir Nahi Ani 2. In 2022, he appeared in Nadeem Baig's London Nahi Jaunga.

== Awards and nominations ==
Saeed has received numerous award nominations and honours including a minimum of 5 Lux Style Awards. He received special recognition awards at Pakistan Achievement Awards 2015 UK and Europe and at fourth Hum Awards in 2016 for his invaluable contribution towards revival of Pakistani cinema. Saeed's film Jawani Phir Nahi Ani swept the ARY Film Awards ceremony with total of 17 awards, also earning him the award for the best male actor in a leading role. He was awarded the Pride of Performance by the President of Pakistan on 23 March 2021.

Year	Awards	Category	Film / Drama	Result	Ref(s)
1996	PTV Awards	Best Actor in a Telefilm (TV)	Ab Tum Ja Saktey Ho	Won	
2000	PTV Awards	Best Actor		Won	
2000	National Awards	Best Actor in a Negative Role (Film)	Inteha	Won	
2002	PTV Awards	Best Actor (TV)	Kangan	Won	
2002	Graduate Awards	Best Actor	Inteha	Won	
2002	Nigaar Awards	Best Actor	Inteha	Won	
2005	The 1st Indus Drama Awards	Best TV Actor in a Drama Series	Mujrim (Maa Aur Mamta)	Won	
2014	1st ARY Film Awards	Best Actor in a Leading Role (Popular)	Main Hoon Shahid Afridi	Nominated	
2014	1st ARY Film Awards	Best Actor in a Leading Role (Jury)	Main Hoon Shahid Afridi	Won	
2016	4th Hum Awards	Best Actor (Recognition Award)	Jawani Phir Nahi Ani, Bin Roye	Won	
2016	2nd ARY Film Awards	Best Actor in a Leading Role	Jawani Phir Nahi Ani	Won	
2020	Pakistan International Screen Awards	Best TV Actor	Meray Paas Tum Ho	Won	

=== Lux Style Awards ===
==== Acting awards ====
Year	Ceremony	Category	Project	Result
2002	1st Lux Style Awards	Best TV Actor	N/A	Nominated
2003	2nd Lux Style Awards	Best TV Actor	Chaandni Raatain	Won
2004	3rd Lux Style Awards	Best TV Actor	Mehndi	Won
2005	4th Lux Style Awards	Best TV Actor (Terrestrial)	Hum Se Juda Na Hona	Won
2007	6th Lux Style Awards	Best TV Actor (Satellite)	Tere Ishq Mein	Nominated
2008	7th Lux Style Awards	Best TV Actor (Satellite)	Koi Toh Barish	Won
2010	9th Lux Style Awards	Best TV Actor (Satellite)	Ishq Junoon Deewangi	Won
2010	9th Lux Style Awards	Best TV Actor (Satellite)	Doraha	Nominated
2014	13th Lux Style Awards	Best Film Actor	Main Hoon Shahid Afridi	Nominated
2016	15th Lux Style Awards	Best Lead Actor in a Film	Jawani Phir Nahi Ani	Won
2017	16th Lux Style Awards	Best TV Actor	Dil Lagi	Nominated
2018	17th Lux Style Awards	Best Lead Actor in a Film	Punjab Nahi Jaungi	Won
2020	19th Lux Style Awards	Best TV Actor	Mere Paas Tum Ho	Nominated

==== Production awards ====
	Ceremony	Category	Project	Result	Ref(s)
2005	4th Lux Style Awards	Best TV Play (Satellite)	Moorat	Nominated	
2005	4th Lux Style Awards	Best TV Play (Satellite)	Ana	Won	
2005	4th Lux Style Awards	Best TV Play (Terrestrial)	Hum Se Juda Na Hona	Won	
2006	5th Lux Style Awards	Best TV Play (Satellite)	Riyasat	Won	
2008	7th Lux Style Awards	Best TV Play (Satellite)	Sarkar Sahab	Nominated	
2008	7th Lux Style Awards	Best TV Play (Terrestrial)	Yaadain	Nominated	
2010	9th Lux Style Awards	Best TV Play (Satellite)	Doraha	Nominated	
2011	10th Lux Style Awards	Best TV Play (Satellite)	Daam	Nominated	
2011	10th Lux Style Awards	Best TV Play (Satellite)	Ijazat	Nominated	
2013	12th Lux Style Awards	Best TV Play (Terrestrial)	Talafi	Nominated	
2013	12th Lux Style Awards	Best TV Play (Satellite)	Man Jali	Nominated	
2014	13th Lux Style Awards	Best Film	Main Hoon Shahid Afridi	Nominated	
2014	13th Lux Style Awards	Best Original Soundtrack	Main Hoon Shahid Afridi	Won	
2014	13th Lux Style Awards	Best TV Play (Terrestrial)	Daag-e-Nadamat	Nominated	
2015	14th Lux Style Awards	Best TV Play	Pyarey Afzal	Won	
2015	14th Lux Style Awards	Best TV Play	Shikwa	Nominated	
2015	14th Lux Style Awards	Best TV Play	Chup Raho	Nominated	
2015	14th Lux Style Awards	Best Original Soundtrack	Nazdeekiyan	Nominated	
2016	15th Lux Style Awards	Best Film	Jawani Phir Nahi Ani	Nominated	
2017	16th Lux Style Awards	Best TV Play	Dil Lagi	Won	
2017	16th Lux Style Awards	Best TV Play	Besharam	Nominated	
2018	17th Lux Style Awards	Best Film	Punjab Nahi Jaungi	Won	
2019	18th Lux Style Awards	Best Film	Jawani Phir Nahi Ani 2	Nominated	
2019	18th Lux Style Awards	Best TV Play	Dil Mom Ka Diya	Nominated	
2020	19th Lux Style Awards	Best TV Play	Mere Paas Tum Ho	Won	
2022	21st Lux Style Awards	Best TV Long Play	Benaam	Nominated	
2022	21st Lux Style Awards	Best TV Long Play	Nand	Nominated	

=== Other awards and honours ===
- Best Actor Award at Pakistan Achievement Awards
- Pride of Performance by President of Pakistan

== See also ==
- List of Pakistani actors
