= Moorat =

- Poster
- Genre: Drama
- Written by: Seema Ghazal
- Directed by: Kamran Qureshi
- Starring: Abid Ali; Maria Wasti; Kashif Mehmood; Asad Malik; Deeba; Munawar Saeed; Mehmood Akhtar; Rashid Farooqui; Tahira Wasti; Tamanna Begum
- Opening theme: "Bewafa Zamany me" by Tina Sani
- Composer: Waqar Ali
- Country of origin: Pakistan
- Original language: Urdu
- No. of episodes: 33

Production
- Producers: Humayun Saeed; Abdullah Kadwani; Salman Nanitalwala
- Editor: Adnan Wai Qureshi
- Camera setup: Syed Naeem Rizvi
- Running time: 40 min
- Production company: 7th Sky Entertainment

Original release
- Network: ARY Digital
- Release: 2 August 2004 – 15 March 2005

Moorat (Urdu: مورت; English: Eunuch's Wedding) is a Pakistani TV serial which premiered on ARY Digital. It is directed by Kamran Qureshi, written by Seema Ghazal, and produced by Humayun Saeed and Abdullah Kadwani's production house, 7th Sky Entertainment.

It centers on a boy who is snubbed and abused by his brother and father, and to find love outside the home. The story deals with the taboo subject of eunuchs who suffer endlessly in silence, wrapped in slurs and miseries. This story aims to show their deprived and isolated world, and portrays how they are not different from others in experiencing human emotions and feelings, and that their world is not much different from other people.

== Cast ==
=== Main ===
- Abid Ali as Eunuch Reshma
- Maria Wasti as Kosar
- Kashif Mehmood as Eunuch Babra
- Asad Malik as Police Officer Majeed
- Deeba as Sughra
- Munawar Saeed as Karim
- Mehmood Akhtar as Eunuch Shola
- Ehtasham Warsi as Eunuch Bijli
- Rashid Farooqui as Eunuch Chamki
- Adnan Jilani as Asim
- Sundus Shah as Young Kosar
- Ammar Shah as Young Babar
- Fawad Shah as Young Asim

=== Supporting ===
- Tamanna Begum as Kinza's mother
- Kinza as Asim's Wife
- Qaiser Naqvi as Bitto Khala
- Parveen Akbar as Hameeda
- Tahira Wasti as Mother of Eunuch Reshma
- Gaysoo as Kosar's Friend
- Raju Jamil as Father of Eunuch Reshma
- Akbar Subhani as Karamat
- Hareem Qureshi as Eunuch's daughter

== Plot ==
Babar is the younger son of housewife Sughra and shopkeeper Kareem. When he is young, his mother constantly saves him from his father's physical beating and verbal abuse and his brother's rude behavior in response to Babar's flamboyant behavior. Growing up, Babar likes all stereotypically girlish things such as jewellery, cosmetics, shiny clothes, and playing with dolls, and he starts going to eunuch Reshma's house who loves him and cares for him like a second mother. He grows up watching all this around him and starts spending more time with Reshma and her eunuch friends Bijli and Shola. He begins talking like a girl, and goes to dancing events with eunuchs in parties and weddings, which is their profession.

Years later Babar's parents eventually decide to marry him to his cousin Kosar. He behaves in the same way with Kosar, praising her dress and jewellery. When Kosar sees him on their wedding night, she remembers that she has seen him as a eunuch in another wedding. The next morning when her mother comes, Kosar tells her and she takes Kosar back home. Kareem and Asim beat Babar and he leaves home, and goes and lives with Reshma.

Kosar visits Reshma's house and brings Babar back, thinking she might be able to change him. Later Kosar becomes pregnant and the same day Babar learns that Reshma has cancer and is in need of much money for her treatment. He leaves home and does not stop when Sughra and Kosar try to stop him. Kosar leaves home and goes to her aunt's home. She receives divorce papers from Babar. Later Kosar gives birth to a baby girl. Reshma dies of cancer and her parents come.

Asim has already left home with his wife due to Babar. Kosar marries her aunt's son Majeed who is an honest police officer and likes Kosar. However, he doesn't like Kosar's daughter. Sughra dies after being sick and mentally unbalanced.

More time progresses and Kosar eventually gives birth to a baby son, and on the birth ceremony of the baby, eunuchs come to their house to celebrate and perform. She watches Babar dancing with his mates. Kosar snatches the baby from Majeed when Babar is about to take the baby in his lap and pushes Babar, who falls on the floor next to his daughter and there he discovers that the girl is his daughter. He tries to put his hand on the head of the girl, who moves away from Babar. Majeed then realizes what Kosar would have gone through and accepts the girl as a daughter.

== Soundtrack ==
The main theme song, "Bewafa Zamanay me", was composed by Waqar Ali and sung by Tina Sani. It was written by Mehmood Akhtar. Waris Shah's Punjabi poetry was used in the second theme song, which was sung by Master Aslam. The music video was made with Tina Sani, and slow versions of the songs were used in key situations.

Moorat

Soundtrack album by Tina Sani
- Genre: Theme song
- Length: 4:30
- Language: Urdu

== Awards and nominations ==
4th Lux Style Awards

- Nominated - Best TV Serial (2005)
- Nominated - Best TV Actress (2005) - Maria Wasti
- Nominated - Best TV Actor (2005) - Abid Ali
- Nominated - Best TV Director (2005) - Kamran Qureshi
