= 47th Nigar Awards =

2017 cancelled Pakistani film award

- Date: 2032 TBA

47th Nigar Awards were going to be held on 16 March 2017. They were supposed to be held after a hiatus of 15 years. The awards were postponed and did not take place.

The last (46th) Nigar Awards ceremony was held on April 3, 2004, in Lahore, Pakistan.

== Nominees ==
Nominations were announced on 20 February 2017.

Nigar Award for Best Film	Nigar Award for Best Director
Actor in Law; Ho Mann Jahaan; Maallik; Mah e Mir; Janaan; Dobara Phir Se	Nabeel Qureshi - Actor in Law; Azfar Jafri - Janaan; Mehreen Jabbar - Dobara Phir Se
Nigar Award for Best Actor	Nigar Award for Best Actress
Fahad Mustafa - Mah e Mir; Mohib Mirza - Bachaana; Yasir Hussain - Lahore Se Aagey; Sajid Hasan - Rahm	Saba Qamar - Lahore Se Aagey; Mahira Khan - Ho Mann Jahaan; Maira Khan - Revenge of the Worthless; Mehwish Hayat - Actor in Law; Armeena Rana Khan - Janaan
Nigar Award for Best Supporting Actor	Nigar Award for Best Supporting Actress
Ehteshamuddin - Maalik; Manzar Sehbai - Mah e Mir; Alyy Khan - Zindagi Kitni Haseen Hay; Hameed Sheikh - Abdullah: The Final Witness; Ajab Gul - Salute	Saima - Salute; Sanam Saeed - Dobara Phir Se; Sonya Jehan - Ho Mann Jahaan; Mishi Khan - Janaan; Seerat Jaffri - Rahm
Nigar Award for Best Debut Male	Nigar Award for Best Debut Female
Sunil Shankar - Rahm; Feroze Khan - Zindagi Kitni Haseen Hay; Yasir Shah - Blind Love; Sheheryar Munawar - Ho Mann Jahaan; Adeel Hussain - Ho Mann Jahaan	Sajal Ali - Zindagi Kitni Haseen Hay; Sanam Saeed - Bachaana; Nimra Khan - Blind Love; Rabia Butt - Hijrat
Nigar Award for Best Music Director	Nigar Award for Best Lyricist
Shani Arshad - Actor in Law; Zeb Bangash, Faakhir, Ehtesham Malik - Ho Mann Jahaan; Soch - Zindagi Kitni Haseen Hay; Haniya Aslam & Justin Gray - Dobara Phir Se; Shiraz Uppal - Lahore Se Aagey	Asrar - Oh Khudaya - Actor in Law; Shakeel Sohail - Lar Gayan - Dobara Phir Se; Shakeel Sohail - Baifikriyan - Lahore Se Aagey, Adnan Dholl - Tootiya Taraa - Zindagi Kitni Haseen Hay; Imran Razza - Nazaria - Maalik
Nigar Award for Best Playback Singer Male	Nigar Award for Best Playback Singer Female
Atif Aslam - Dil Dancer Hogaya - Actor in Law; Asrar - Shakarwandan - Ho Mann Jahaan; Rahat Fateh Ali Khan - Oh Khudaya - Actor in Law; SOCH - Tootiya Taraa - Zindagi Kitni Haseen Hay	Aima Baig - Bai Fikriyan - Lahore Se Aagey; Mai Dhai - Sarak Sarak - Ho Mann Jahaan; Masuma Anwar - Naina Roye - Maalik; Zeb Bangash - Dil Pagla - Ho Mann Jahaan; Natasha Baig- Jhoom Lay - Janaan
Nigar Award for Best Debut Director	Nigar Award for Best Actor In a Negative Role
Ashir Azeem - Maalik; Asim Raza - Ho Mann Jahaan; Anjum Shahzad - Mah e Mir; Jamal Shah - Revenge of the Worthless; Hashim Nadeem - Abdullah: The Final Witness; Ahmed Jamal - Rehm	Hasan Niyazi - Maalik; Sheraz Butt - Salute; Sunil Shankar - Rehm; Sanam Saeed - Mah e Mir; Amir Qureshi - Blind Love
Nigar Award for Best Screenplay	Nigar Award for Best Story
Yasir Hussain - Lahore Se Aagey; Ashir Azeem - Maalik; Muhammad Pervez Kalim - Blind Love; Fizza Ali Meerza - Actor in Law; Abdul Khaliq Khan - Zindagi Kitni Haseen Hay	Sarmad Sehbai - Mah e Mir; Ashir Azeem - Maalik; Fizza Ali Meerza - Actor in Law; Asim Raza - Ho Mann Jahaan; Abdul Khaliq Khan - Zindagi Kitni Haseen Hay
Nigar Award for Best Dialogue	Nigar Award for Best Choreographer
Yasir Hussain - Lahore Se Aagey; Ashir Azeem - Maalik; Fizza Ali Meerza - Actor in Law; Sarmad Sehbai - Mah e Mir; Mahmood Jamal - Rahm	Nigah Hussain - Ho Mann Jahaan; Wahab Shah, Hasan Rizvi - Lahore Se Aagey; James Koroni - Dobara Phir Se; Faizan Ehbab - Janaan; Papur Samrath - Mah e Mir
Nigar Award for Best Cinematography
Ali Bukhari - Blind Love; Adil Askari - Salute; Rana Kamran - Actor in Law; Salman Razzaq Khan - Ho Mann Jahaan; Asrad Khan - Lahore Se Aagey
