= Pakistani Academy Selection Committee =

Committee to choose entries to film awards

The Pakistani Academy Selection Committee (PASC) is a non-governmental selection committee of Pakistani film director, producers, writers, actors, distributors and exhibitors, headquartered in Karachi and Lahore. The PASC selects the Pakistani Official entry for the Academy Award for Best Foreign Language Film each year. However, submission is not bound to Foreign Language category, if meets with the eligibility requirements of Academy's rules, it is permissible for every competitive award. Emmy-nominated filmmaker Mohammed Ali Naqvi is the chairman and head of the committee who oversees the final selection for Oscars, as of 2023.

== Eligibility Criteria ==
The PASC choose one film as Pakistan’s official submission for the, "Foreign Language Film Award." A foreign language film is defined as a feature-length motion picture produced outside the United States of America with a predominantly non-English dialogue track. The criteria for eligibility is as follows:

- The motion picture must be first released in the country of submission no earlier than, e.g. 1 October 20XX and no later than 30 September 20XX, and be first publicly exhibited for at least seven consecutive days in a commercial motion picture theater for the profit of the producer and exhibitor.
- Submissions must be in 35 mm or 70 mm, or in a 24 or 48 frame/s progressive scan digital cinema format with minimum resolution not less than 1280x720 and projector resolution of 2048 by 1080 pixels, source image format conforming to ST 428-1:2006 D-Cinema Distribution Master – Image Characteristics; image compression (if used) conforming to ISO/IEC 15444-1 (JPEG 2000); and image and sound file formats suitable for exhibition in commercial Digital Cinema sites.
- The audio in a typical Digital Cinema Package (DCP) is 5.1 channels of discrete audio, and that is the preferred audio configuration, although up to 7.1 channels is acceptable. The minimum for a non-mono configuration of the audio shall be three channels as Left, Centre, Right (a Left/Right configuration is not acceptable in a theatrical environment).
- The audio data shall be formatted in conformance with ST 428-2:2006 D-Cinema Distribution Master – Audio Characteristics and ST 428-3:2006 D-Cinema Distribution Master – Audio Channel Mapping and Channel Labeling.
- The picture must be advertised and exploited during its eligibility run in a manner considered normal and customary to the industry. The picture need not have been released in the United States.
- Films that, in any version, receive a nontheatrical public exhibition or distribution before their first qualifying theatrical release will not be eligible for Academy Awards consideration. Nontheatrical public exhibition or distribution includes but is not limited to:
1. Broadcast and cable television
2. PPV/VOD
3. DVD distribution
4. Internet transmission
- The recording of the original dialogue track as well as the completed picture must be predominantly in a language or languages other than English. Accurate English-language subtitles are required.

== Submissions ==
=== Pre-2013 submissions ===
Before 2013, as no committee was formed, films were sent by directors by themselves. The 1958 Urdu film Jago Hua Savera was Pakistan's first submission, but the film was not selected from the selection process to shortlist and to final five nominations. In 1963 second film Ghunghat was also fail to compete in selection process.

=== Submissions and committees by year ===
Following is the complete details of selection committee's submissions for Best Foreign Language Film category at Academy Awards.

Submitting date	Ceremony	Submitted Film	Directors	Committee	Results
1959	32nd Academy Awards	The Day Shall Dawn	A. J. Kardar	No Committee	Not nominated
1963	36th Academy Awards	The Veil	Khurshid Anwar	No Committee	Not nominated
September 25, 2013	86th Academy Awards	Zinda Bhaag	Meenu Gaur and Farjad Nabi	Sharmeen Obaid-Chinoy	Not nominated
September 18, 2014	87th Academy Awards	Dukhtar	Afia Nathaniel	Sharmeen Obaid-Chinoy, Mehreen Jabbar, Samina Peerzada, Rahat Kazmi, Mohsin Hamid, Iram Parveen Bilal and Framji Minwalla and Akifa Mian	Not nominated
September 10, 2015	88th Academy Awards	Moor	Jami	Sharmeen Obaid-Chinoy, Maheen Khan, Rohail Hyatt, Aamina Sheikh, Faran Tahir, Alyy Khan, Afia Nathaniel, Mazhar Zaidi, Daniyal Mueenuddin and Satish Anand, (filmmaker)	Not nominated
September 22, 2016	89th Academy Awards	Mah e Mir	Anjum Shahzad	Sharmeen Obaid Chinoy, Iram Parveen Bilal, Zeba Bakhtiyar, Adnan Siddiqui, Hasan Zaidi, Sarmad Sultan Khoosat, Jamshed Mahmood Raza, Jamil Dehlavi, Adnan Sarwar and Sheema Kermani (classical dancer)	Not nominated
September 17, 2017	90th Academy Awards	Saawan	Farhsan Alam	Sharmeen Obaid Chinoy, Jerjees Seja, Nadeem Mandviwalla, Asim Raza, Momina Duraid, Talat Hussain, Sakina Samo, Rizwan Beyg, Mohammad Hanif and Ali Hamza	Not nominated

== Nominations ==
The "Best Foreign Language Film" category was not created until 1956; however, between 1947 and 1955, the Academy presented a non-competitive Honorary Award for the best foreign language films released in the United States. Pakistan the submit its first ever film in 1959, three after the category introduced, however film fails to make it in final nomination. Second submission was made in 1963 by Khawaja Khurshid Anwar, it also fails to reach in top five. After that, with the political and economical crises of country, Pakistani Cinema and theaters went into the doomed state, good productions and quality work were completely lost, acclaimed filmmakers also stopped production due to the lack of funds and proper attention of media, also major awarding ceremony Nigar Awards were also abolished as no quality work was available, deterioration state of cinema remains for fifty-years. Year 2013 brought the new wave in Pakistani cinema, when seven independent and local collaborated films, brought the lost integrity of film industry, among them Zinda Bhaag was the first film which was sent by committee after 50 years from four chosen films, however was not nominated like its predecessors. In 2014, committee selected Dukhtar, for submission at 87th Academy Awards, which did not get nomination. In 2015 selection Moor was submitted on 10 September 2015 with the initial deadline of 25 August 2015 given by Academy, it failed to reach the December shortlist and did not get the nomination. On 22 September 2016 committee announced Mah e Mir as its official submission at 89th Academy Awards, which was previously scheduled to be announced on 16 September 2016.

== See also ==
- List of Pakistani submissions for the Academy Award for Best Foreign Language Film
