= List of Pakistani films of 2016 =

List of Pakistani films by year 2016

This is a partial list of Pakistani films scheduled to release in 2016:

== Highest-grossing films ==
The top 10 films released in 2016 by worldwide gross are as follows:

Background color indicates the current releases

Highest-grossing films of 2016
Rank	Title	Studio	Gross	Ref.
1.	Actor in Law	Urdu 1 Pictures	Rs. 30.00 crore (US$1.1 million)	
2.	Janaan	IRK Films	Rs. 30.00 crore (US$1.1 million)	
3.	Ho Mann Jahaan	The Vision Factory Films	Rs. 22.50 crore (US$800,000)	
4.	Lahore Se Aagey	Showcase Films, AN Entertainment Pvt. Ltd.	Rs. 21.60 crore (US$770,000)	
5.	Dobara Phir Se	ARY Films	Rs. 10.50 crore (US$380,000)	
6.	Bachaana	Big Film Entertainment	Rs. 10.00 crore (US$360,000)	
7.	3 Bahadur: The Revenge Of Baba Balaam	Waadi Animations	Rs. 8.10 crore (US$290,000)	
8.	Maalik	Waadi Animations	Rs. 7.30 crore (US$260,000)	
9.	Jeewan Hathi	Media Hub	Rs. 6.50 crore (US$230,000)	
10.	Zindagi Kitni Haseen Hay	RC Films Kingfisher Films	Rs. 3.00 crore (US$110,000)	

== Events ==
=== Award ceremonies ===
Date	Event	Host	Location	Ref.
16 April	2nd ARY Film Awards	ARY Digital Network	Madinat Jumeirah, Dubai, UAE	
23 April	4th Hum Awards	Hum Network Limited	Expo Center, Karachi, Sindh	
29 July	15th Lux Style Awards	Lux Style Awards	Karachi, Sindh, Pakistan	
27 October	1st Hum Style Awards	Hum Style Awards	Expo Center Karachi, Sindh, Pakistan	

== Releases ==
=== January – April ===
Opening		Title	Genre	Director	Cast	Ref.
J A N						
J A N	1	Ho Mann Jahaan	Musical/Romance	Asim Raza	Adeel Hussain, Mahira Khan, Sheheryar Munawar, Sonya Jehan, Bushra Ansari, Nimra Bucha, Arshad Mehmood, Munawar Siddiqui, Jamal Shah	
F E B	26	Bachaana	Romance-thriller	Nasir Khan	Mohib Mirza, Sanam Saeed, Adeel Hashmi	
A P R	8	Maalik	Action-thriller	Ashir Azeem	Ashir Azeem, Farhan Ali Agha, Sajid Hassan, Shakeel Hussain Khan, Hassan Niazi, Adnan Shah Tipu, Mohammed Ehteshamuddin, Rashid Farooqi, Tatmain ul Qalb, Mariam Ansari, Pakiza, Lubna Aslam	
A P R	22	Hijrat	Romantic-thriller	Farooq Mengal	Asad Zaman, Rabia Butt, Noman Ejaz, Nadeem Baig, Salma Agha, Ayub Khoso, Rubab Ali, Wiam Dahmani, Mareeha Safdar, Zaib Rehman, Jamal Shah, Durdana Butt, Sana Nawaz	

=== May – August ===
Opening		Title	Genre	Director	Cast	Ref.
M A Y	6	Mah e Mir	Biographical	Anjum Shahzad	Fahad Mustafa, Iman Ali, Sanam Saeed, Manzar Sehbai, Alyy Khan	
M A Y	13	Hotal	Psycho-Thriller	Khalid Hasan Khan	Meera, Anees Raja, Jasmine Sandlas, Nasreen Jaan, Baila Naz, Wiam Dahmani, Tariq Jamal	
M A Y	20	Aksbandh	Horror	Emran Hussain	Bilal Yousufzai, Danial Afzal, Saud Imtiaz, Ayaz Samoo, Shehzeen Rahat, Mahrukh Rizvi, Arshad Ali	
J U L	6	Sawaal 700 Crore Dollar Ka	Action-Thriller	Jamshed Jan Mohammad	Ghulam Mohiuddin, Javaid Sheikh, Shamoon Abbasi, Ismail Tara, Nayyar Ejaz, Iftikhar Thakur, Ali Mohiuddin, Qurat Ul Ain	
J U L	22	Ishq Positive	Romantic comedy	Noor Bukhari	Noor Bukhari, Wali Hamid Ali Khan, Saud, Shafqat Cheema, Saim Ali, Ahmed Ali, Faria Bukhari, Durdana Butt, Sonu Sood	
J U L	22	Revenge of the Worthless	Action drama	Jamal Shah	Jamal Shah, Ayub Khoso, Firdous Jamal, Shamyl Khan, Maira Khan, Emel Karakose, Asif Shah, Asaldin Khan, Imran Tareen, Iram, Shehrbano, Abdul Rahim, Najeebullah Anjum, Tariq Jamal, Arshad, Sultan, Kaleemullah, Qazi Zubair, Wafa Khan, Rafique, Marjan	
A U G	5	Dance Kahani	Dance	Omar Hassan	Madeleine Hanna, Alamdar Khan, Vernin U'chong	
A U G	5	Blind Love	Romantic	Faisal Bukhari	Yasir Shah, Mathira, Nimra Khan, Aamir Qureshi, Fawad Jalal, Imran Bukhari	
A U G	24	A Wedding (Note: The press kit indicates the film is a co-production between Pakistan and three European countries (Belgium, France, and Luxembourg))	Drama	Stephan Streker	Lina El Arabi, Sebastien Houbani, Babak Karimi, Neena Kulkarni, Olivier Gourmet, Alice de Lencquesaing, Zacharie Chasseriaud, and Aurora Marion	

=== September - December ===
Opening		Title	Genre	Director	Cast	Ref.
S E P	2	Teri Meri Love Story	Romantic comedy	Jawad Bashir	Mohib Mirza, Ushna Shah, Omar Shahzad, Uzma Khan, Mohsin Abbas Haider, Salman Shahid, Laila Zuberi, Ahmed Abdul Rehman, Ahsan Rahim, Jawad Bashir, Faisal Qureshi	
S E P	13	Janaan	Romance drama, Comedy	Azfar Jafri	Armeena Khan, Bilal Ashraf, Ali Rehman Khan, Ajab Gul, Mishi Khan, Hania Aamir, Usman Mukhtar, Nayyar Ejaz	
S E P	13	Actor in Law	Socio Comedy	Nabeel Qureshi	Fahad Mustafa, Mehwish Hayat, Om Puri, Alyy Khan, Saboor Ali, Nayyar Ejaz	
S E P	13	Zindagi Kitni Haseen Hay	Romance drama	Anjum Shahzad	Sajal Ali, Feroze Khan, Alyy Khan, Shafqat Cheema, Jibraiyl Ahmed, Nayyar Ejaz, Rashid Farooqui	
O C T	28	Abdullah: The Final Witness	Mystery, Action-Drama	Hashim Nadeem	Imran Abbas, Sadia Khan, Hameed Sheikh, Sajid Hassan, Imran Tareen, Saleem Mughal, Zuhab Khan	
N O V	4	Jeewan Hathi	Dark Comedy	Meenu Gaur, Farjad Nabi	Hina Dilpazeer, Naseeruddin Shah, Samiya Mumtaz, Saife Hassan, Fawad Khan, Adnan Jaffar, Nimra Bucha, Kiran Tabeer, Jahangir Khan, Nazarul Hassan	
N O V	11	Lahore Se Aagey	Road, Comedy	Wajahat Rauf	Yasir Hussain, Saba Qamar, Mubashir Malik, Rubina Ashraf, Behroze Sabzwari, Atiqa Odho, Abdullah Farhatullah, Hasan Rizvi, Omer Sultan, Ashir Wajahat, Ahmed Ali	
N O V	18	Rahm	Dark Drama, Thriller	Ahmed Jamal	Sanam Saeed, Rohail Pirzada, Sunil Shankar, Sajid Hasan, Nayyar Ejaz, Seerat Jafri, Khalid Butt	
N O V	25	Dobara Phir Se	Romance drama	Mehreen Jabbar	Ali Kazmi, Sanam Saeed, Hareem Farooq, Adeel Hussain, Atiqa Odho, Tooba Siddiqui, Shaz Khan	
D E C	1	Gardaab	Romance Drama	Harune Massey	Amna Ilyas, Fawad Khan (Theatre Actor), Gohar Rasheed, Adnan Shah Tipu, Nimra Bucha, Naseeruddin Shah (Cameo)	
D E C	2	8969	Murder Mystery Thriller	Azeem Sajjad	Saba Qamar, Sadaf Hamid, Anam Malik, Hussain Tiwana, Sama Shah, Haseeb Khan, Oun Sarvar, Ali Jabran Khan	
D E C	2	Salute (2016 film)	Biographical	Shahzad Rafique	Ali Mohtesham as Aitzaz Hasan, Ajab Gul, Saima Noor, Imran Khan, Adnan Khan, Nayyar Ejaz, Rashid Mehmood, Pervaiz Kaleem, Jalal Haider	
D E C	3	Oye Kuch Kar Guzar	Online/Comedy	Harris Rasheed	Ali Safina, Uzair Jaswal, Ushna Shah, Mahjabeen Habib	
D E C	15	3 Bahadur: The Revenge of Baba Balaam	Animated Thriller	Sharmeen Obaid Chinoy	Zuhab Khan, Hanzala Shahid, Arisha Razi, Fahad Mustafa, Salman Shahid, Behroze Sabzwari, Sarwat Gilani, Ahmed Ali Butt	
	16	Saya e Khuda e Zuljalal	Historical, Action-War film	Umair Fazli	Javed Sheikh, Firdous Jamal, Moammar Rana, Arbaaz Khan, Sohail Sameer, Rachel Gill, Nimra Khan, Kamran Mujahid, Aamir Qureshi, Rambo, Shafqat Cheema, Asad Malik, Nayyar Ejaz, Iftikhar Thakur, Jia Ali, Noor Bukhari	

== See also ==
- 2016 in Pakistan
