= Madhumita =

Madhumita may refer to:

== People ==
- Madhumita Bisht, Indian badminton player
- Madhumita Kumari, Indian archer
- Madhumita Mohanta, Indian chef
- Madhumita Murgia, writer and journalist
- Madhumita Raut, Indian dancer
- Madhumita Sarcar, Indian actress and model
- Mitali Madhumita, Indian army officer
- Madhumitha, Indian Tamil actress
- Madhumitha (director), Indian Tamil director

== Other uses ==
- Modhumita, Bangladeshi movie theater

== See also ==
- Madhumati, a 1958 Indian thriller film by Bimal Roy
- Madhumati (2013 film), a 2013 Indian film
- Madhumati Mitra, an Indian judge
