= Actor in Law =

2016 Pakistani film by Nabeel Qureshi

- Theatrical release Poster
- Urdu: ایکٹر ان لاء
- Directed by: Nabeel Qureshi
- Written by: Fizza Ali Meerza; Nabeel Qureshi
- Produced by: Fizza Ali Meerza; Mehdi Ali
- Starring: Fahad Mustafa; Mehwish Hayat; Saboor Aly; Om Puri; Alyy Khan
- Cinematography: Rana Kamran
- Edited by: Asif Mumtaz
- Music by: Shani Arshad
- Production company: Filmwala Pictures
- Distributed by: Urdu1 Pictures; Overseas; Fox Star Studios
- Release dates: 8 September 2016 (Dubai); 13 September 2016 (Pakistan)
- Running time: 1 h 56 min
- Country: Pakistan
- Language: Urdu
- Box office: Rs. 300 million (US$1.1 million)

Actor in Law is a 2016 Pakistani socio-comedy film directed by Nabeel Qureshi, co-written and produced by Fizza Ali Meerza along with Mehdi Ali. The film was released on Eid-ul-Adha 2016 by Urdu 1 Pictures. The film stars Fahad Mustafa and Mehwish Hayat in lead roles. The cast also includes veteran Indian actor Om Puri in his first Pakistani film. On 19 April 2017, the movie received the Best Film award at the 16th Lux Style Awards.

== Plot ==
Fahad Mustafa stars as an upcoming lawyer who employs theatrics and over-the-top one-liners in the courtroom. He aspires to become an actor, something which is met with disapproval from his father. His world is turned upside down when he is faced with a case that shakes the foundation of the country and threatens his career and family. Will he be able to use his theatricality and knowledge of the law to ensure justice?

The film also fictionally portrays the celebrities in Pakistan such as the model Ayyan Ali and news anchor Mubashir Lucman.

== Cast ==
- Fahad Mustafa as Shan Mirza
- Om Puri as Rafaqat Mirza
- Mehwish Hayat as Meenu Screwala
- Lubna Aslam as Shan's mother
- Saboor Ali as Annie Mirza
- Alyy Khan as Muddasir Sultan
- Irfan Motiwala as Fridge Man
- Saife Hassan as Guddu Mamu
- Saleem Mairaj as Mehboob Bhai
- Anoushay Abbasi as Meenu's Friend
- Kaizer Behram Irani as Meenu's Mother
- Noor ul Hassan
- Ahson Talish as a Politician

=== Special appearance ===
- Humayun Saeed as himself
- Mahira Khan as herself
- Nayyar Ejaz as a Lawyer
- Rehan Sheikh as a Lawyer
- Talat Hussain as a Judge
- Atif Aslam as himself in music video "Dil Yeh Dancer Hogaya"
- Nabeel Qureshi as himself in title song "Actor in Law"
- Ali Zafar as himself on Billboard
- Imran Abbas as himself on billboard
- Ayeza Khan as herself on billboard
- Annas Kashif as himself

== Development and production ==
The film is directed by Nabeel Qureshi and produced by Fizza Ali Meerza and Mehdi Ali, making it their second project after Na Maloom Afraad. The details about the film were unveiled by Nabeel Qureshi and Fizza Ali Meerza at a press conference in Karachi on 9 January 2016. The press conference was also attended by Fahad Mustafa, Mehwish Hayat, Alyy Khan and Indian actor Om Puri, who made his Lollywood debut. The producer Fizza also revealed that the film stars Fahad Mustafa and Mehwish Hayat in lead roles. The cast also includes Alyy Khan, Saife Hassan, Saleem Mairaj, Saboor Ali, Anoushay Abbasi and Ahson Talish in important roles. Humayun Saeed, Mahira Khan, Nayyar Ejaz, Talat Hussain, Rehan Sheikh, and Rashid Khawaja all made special appearances in the film. Om Puri said he signed the film because the script was different and unique. He also stated that the title Actor in Law was suggested by him. "I didn't know this team personally when I was approached for the film. But I was aware of the fact that Pakistani films have improved a lot," said Puri. The director Nabeel Qureshi said the film is a different story just like Na Maloom Afraad. "Rather than telling jokes, I enjoy telling stories. And audience can expect the same with Actor in Law as well since it has a very unique story," said Qureshi. Cinematography was done by Rana Kamran. It was distributed locally and internationally by Urdu 1 Pictures. It was the first film distributed by Urdu 1. The film was released on the occasion of Eid al-Adha in September 2016.

== Production ==
=== Filming ===
The first spell of the film was shot in Karachi.

=== Marketing ===
The title poster of the film was released in February 2016 while the first look poster was revealed on 24 June 2016 via social media. The director claimed that, Indian actor Om Puri will also come to Pakistan for the promotional purposes of his debut Pakistani film. On 28 June 2016, the trailer launch event was held in PC Hotel, Karachi where character posters were also unveiled. According to the Pakistani box office reports, the Lollywood movie Actor in Law collected over 100 million in just 5 days in Pakistan, which is the second best performance by a Pakistani movie after Jawani Phir Nahi Ani.

== Soundtrack ==
Actor in Law

Soundtrack album by Shani Arshad
- Released: 1 August 2016
- Recorded: 2016
- Genre: Filmi Soundtrack
- Length: 17:00
- Language: Urdu
- Producer: Fizza Ali Meerza

Shani Arshad chronology
Jawani Phir Nahi Ani (2015)	Actor in Law (2016)	Na Maloom Afraad 2 (2017)

Singles from Actor in Law
- 1. "Dil Dancer" Released: 28 August 2016

All music is composed by Shani Arshad.

Track listing
No.	Title	Lyrics	Singer(s)	Length
1.	"Khudaya"	Mohsin Abbas Haider	Rahat Fateh Ali Khan	3:58
2.	"Funkaraan"	Nadeem Asad	Asrar	3:00
3.	"Dil Dancer"	Shani Arshad, Nabeel Qureshi, Fizza Ali Meerza	Atif Aslam	3:44
4.	"Actor in Law"	Nabeel Qureshi, Fizza Ali Meerza	Shani Arshad	3:09
5.	"Actor in Law" (Reprise)	Nabeel Qureshi, Fizza Ali Meerza	Junaid Younis	3:09
Total length:				17:00

== Release ==
Actor in Law released in UAE, UK, and Middle East on 8 September 2015. The film was released nationwide on 13 September (Eid al-Adha) alongside Azfar Jafi's romantic comedy Janaan and Anjum Shahzad's romantic drama Zindagi Kitni Haseen Hay. It was also screened at the first-ever Pakistan Film Festival in New York City, held from December 3–4, 2016, at the Asia Society.

== Reception ==
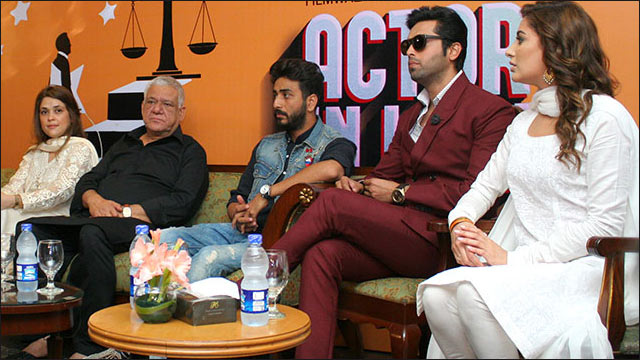
From left to right, Fizza Ali Meerza, Om Puri, Nabeel Qureshi, Fahad Mustafa, and Mehwish Hayat promoting the film in 2016

=== Box office ===
Actor in Law opened to full houses on 13 September 2016. The film managed to exceed expectations and mint Rs. 16 million on its first day. Numbers continued to grow on 14 September and the film minted Rs. 23.5 million on its second day. Film managed to register mark of Rs. 57.4 million at the end of its first weekend. On 16 September 2016, Urdu 1 pictures announced that the film had collected a total of Rs. 60 million over the 3-day Eid Holiday.

On 4 October 2016, it was announced that the film had grossed Rs. 240 million in Pakistan and Rs 60 million in overseas.

=== Critical response ===
The film received mainly positive reviews upon its release with many reviewers praising the blend of social commentary and comedy. Praise was also directed at the performances of Fahad Mustafa and Om Puri.

Dawn's Salima Feerasta rated the film 4 out of 5 stars, commenting that the film "makes a strong case for Fahad Mustafa's ascent as cinema's golden boy". Omair Alavi, writing for The News, commended the film for tackling social issues and praised the performances of Fahad Mustafa, Mehwish Hayat and Om Puri. Rafay Mahmood of Express Tribune gave the film 3/5 stars. He felt the film delivered on several accounts but "[didn't] work on as many layers as NMA and [did] not have the same shock value". Sami Saayer, also writing for Express Tribune, was more encouraging of the film, comparing it to "Manmohan Desai's brand of Cinema".

== Accolades ==
Ceremony	Won	Nominated
16th Lux Style Awards	Fizza Ali Meerza – Best Film; Nabeel Qureshi – Best Director; Fahad Mustafa – Best Actor; Atif Aslam – Best Playback Singer for "Dil Yeh Dancer Hogaya"	Mehwish Hayat – Best Actress; Om Puri – Best Supporting Actor; Saboor Ali – Best Supporting Actress; Asrar – Best Playback Singer for "Funkaraan"
International Pakistan Prestige Awards 2017	Fahad Mustafa – Best Actor; Mehwish Hayat – Best Actress; Om Puri – Best Supporting Actor; Fizza Ali Meerza – Best Film; Nabeel Qureshi – Best Director	Rahat Fateh Ali Khan – Best Singer for "Khudaya"
Pakistan International Film Festival	Fahad Mustafa – Best Actor (Male); Mehwish Hayat – Best Actor (Female)	

== See also ==
- List of Pakistani films of 2016
