= 16th Lux Style Awards =

Pakistani film awards ceremony

- Date: 19 April 2017
- Site: Expo Center, Karachi
- Hosted by: Atif Aslam
- Directed by: Hassan Sheheryar Yasin

Television coverage
- Network: Geo Entertainment

The 16th Lux Style Awards ceremony, presented by Lux to honor the best in fashion, music, films, and Pakistani television of 2016, took place on 19 April 2017 at the Expo Center, Karachi, Sindh. During the ceremony, LUX presented the Lux Style Awards (commonly referred to as LSA) in four segments including Film, Fashion, Television, and Music. Actor in Law remained the most award-winning film with 4 awards while Udaari remained the most award-winning TV series by winning 3 awards.

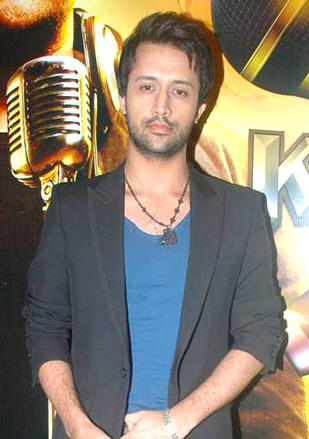
Atif Aslam hosted the 16th Lux Style Awards.

- 18th Lux Style Awards

== Winners and nominees ==
Nominees for the 16th Lux Style Awards were announced on 15 March 2017.

=== Films ===
Best Film	Best Director
Actor in Law- Fizza Ali Meerza and Medhi Ali; Dobara Phir Se - Salman Iqbal and Mohammad Jerjees Seja; Ho Mann Jahaan - Sheheryar Munawar and Asim Raza; Janaan - Hareem Farooq, Imran Raza Kazmi, Munir Hussain and Reham Khan; Mah e Mir - Sahir Rasheed, Khurram Rana and Baddar Ikran	Nabeel Qureshi - Actor in Law; Anjum Shahzad - Mah e Mir; Asim Raza - Ho Mann Jahaan; Azfar Jafri - Janaan; Mehreen Jabbar - Dobara Phir Se; Wajahat Rauf - Lahore Se Aagey
Best Actor	Best Actress
Fahad Mustafa –Actor in Law as Shaan Mirza; Ashir Azeem –Maalik as Major Asad; Fahad Mustafa –Mah e Mir as Jamal/Mir; Mohib Mirza –Bachaana as Waqar or Vicky; Yasir Hussain –Lahore Se Aagey as Mutazalzal a.k.a. Moti	Mahira Khan –Ho Mann Jahaan as Manizeh; Mehwish Hayat –Actor in Law as Meena Screwala; Saba Qamar –Lahore Se Aagey as Taraa Ahmed; Sajal Ali –Zindagi Kitni Haseen Hai as Mahira Khan; Sanam Saeed –Bachaana as Aalia
Best Supporting Actor	Best Supporting Actress
Sheheryar Munawar – Ho Mann Jahaan as Arhan; Ali Kazmi – Dobara Phir Se as Vasay; Ali Rehman Khan – Janaan as Daniyal; Manzar Sehbai – Mah e Mir as Doctor Kaleem; Om Puri – Actor in Law as Rafaqat Mirza	Sanam Saeed – Dobara Phir Se as Samar; Hania Aamir – Janaan as Palwasha; Saboor Ali – Actor in Law as Annie Mirza; Sonya Jehan – Ho Mann Jahaan as Sabina; Tooba Siddiqui – Dobara Phir Se
Best Playback Singer - Male	Best Playback Singer - Female
Atif Aslam – "Dil Dancer" Actor in Law; Armaan Malik – "Janaan Title Track" Janaan; Asrar – "Funkaran" Actor in Law; Rajab Ali – "Yeh Dhuan" Mah e Mir; Shafqat Amanat Ali – "Piya Dekhan Ko" Mah e Mir	Aima Baig – "Kalabaaz Dil" Lahore Se Aagey; Haniya Aslam – "Lar Gaiyyan" Dobara Phir Se; Masuma Anwar – "Naina Roye" Maalik; Shreya Ghoshal – "Janaan Title Track" Janaan; Zeb Bangash – "Dil Pagal" Ho Mann Jahaan

=== Television ===
Best Television Play	Best Television Director
Dil Lagi (ARY Digital); Besharam (ARY Digital); Mann Mayal (Hum TV); Mein Sitara (TV One); Udaari (Hum TV)	Mohammed Ehteshamuddin - Udaari (Hum TV); Farooq Rind - Besharam (ARY Digital); Haseeb Hassan - Mann Mayal (Hum TV); Kashif Nisar - Dumpukht (A Plus); Nadeem Baig - Dil Lagi (ARY Digital)
Best Television Actor	Best Television Actress
Ahsan Khan – Udaari (Hum TV); Humayun Saeed – Dil Lagi (ARY Digital); Faysal Qureshi – Bheegi Palkein (A Plus); Noman Ejaz –Dumpukht (A Plus); Zahid Ahmed – Besharam (ARY Digital)	Maya Ali – Mann Mayal (Hum TV); Mehwish Hayat – Dil Lagi (ARY Digital); Saba Qamar – Mein Sitara (TV One); Sajjal Ali – Gul-e-Rana (Hum TV); Saba Qamar-Besharam (ARY Digital)
Best Television Writer	Best Original Soundtrack
Farhat Ishtiaq - Udaari (Hum TV); Faiza Iftikhar - Dil Lagi (ARY Digital); Samira Fazal - Mann Mayal (Hum TV); Sarwat Nazir - Besharam (ARY Digital); Zafar Mairaj - Dumpukht (A Plus)	Tere Naal Mein Laiyan by Qurat-ul-Ain Balouch - Mann Mayal (Hum TV)); Damia Farooq - Sun Yaara (ARY Digital); Hadiqa Kiani - Udaari (Hum TV); Nabeel Shaukat Ali – Hatheli (Hum TV); Rahat Fateh Ali Khan – Yeh Ishq (ARY Digital)

=== Note ===
It was one of the few years where nominations were evenly divided among all TV channels (Hum TV, ARY Digital, TV One, and A Plus).

=== Music ===
Best Album Of the Year	Best Song of the Year
Na Bhulana – Uzair Jaswal; Book of Sibt – Sibti; Indus Raag 2 – Shareef Awan; Peheli – Mooroo; You: – The Sketches	Saiyaan – Qurat-ul-Ain Balouch; Baarish – Tonight Us and Jimmy Khan; Haiyyah – Sibti; Khak Nasheen – Chand Tara Orchestra; Khaki Banda – Umair Jaswal and Ahmed Jahanzeb
Best Music Video Director	Best Emerging Talent in Music
Kamal Khan – Ho Jao Azad by Zoe Viccaji; Abdullah Haris – Sag-e-Ali by Asrar; Aisha Linea Akhtar and Shahbaz Shigri – Le chaloon by Salman Shaukat; Kamal Khan – The Desert Journey by D/A Method; Shahab Qamar – Hero by Naseer & Shahab	Hamza Akram Qawwal; Bilal Nasir Khan; Natasha Baig; Shehroz Hussain; SomeWhatSuper

=== Fashion ===
Best Model of the Year - Male	Best Model of the Year - Female
Hasnain Lehri; Champ Imi; Animal Khan; Jahan-e-Khalid; Shahzad Noor; Waleed Khalid	Sadaf Kanwal; Amna Babar; Anam Malik; Rabia Butt; Zara Abid
Best Fashion Photographer	Best Hair and Makeup Artist
Shahbaz Shazi; Abdullah Harris; Ali Hassan; Guddu Shani; Nadir Feroz Khan & Maha Burney	Saima Rashid Bargfed; Natasha Khalid; Omayr Waqar; Shammal Qureshi; Shazia Rashid
Best Achievement in Fashion Design - Luxury Prèt	Best Achievement in Fashion Design - Prèt
Shehla Chatoor; Mahgul; Sana Safinaz; Sania Maskatiya; Shamaeel Ansari	Generation; Coco by Zara Shahjahan; Khaadi; Sana Safinaz; Sapphire
Best Achievement in Fashion Design - Lawn	Best Achievement in Fashion Design - Bridal
Elan; Faraz Manan; Sana Safinaz; Shehla Chatoor; Zara Shahjahan	Faraz Manan; Ali Xeeshan; Elan; Mughal; The House of Kamiar Rokni
Best Designer Menswear	Best Emerging Talent in Fashion
Ismail Farid; Ahmed Bham; Amir Adnan; Hassan Sheheryar Yasin; Nauman Arfeen	Hira Shah – Model; Aashna Khan – Photographer; Giti Ara – Model; Imaan Madani – Model; The Pink Tree company – Designer

== Presenters and performers ==
The following individuals presented awards or performed musical numbers.

=== Presenters ===
Name(s)	Role
Noman Ijaz	Presenter of the awards for Best Television Play and Best Television Director
Mahira Khan; Bilal Lashari	Presenters of the award for Best Director (films)

=== Performers ===
Name(s)	Role	Performed
Atif Aslam	Performer	"Qaumi Taranah"
Jimmy Khan	Performer	"Baarish"
Zoe Viccaji	Performer	"Ho Jao Azad"

== Ceremony information ==
In early April 2017, it was announced that Hassan Sheheryar Yasin would be the show's director instead of Frieha Altaf. Altaf had previously been the director for the Lux Style Awards since its inception in 2002 except for the 3rd Lux Style Awards event. On 9 April 2017, in a press conference the show's director Hassan Sheheryar Yasin announced that Atif Aslam would host the ceremony. Aslam expressed that it felt good to host the Lux Style Awards. Osman Khalid Butt was chosen as the scriptwriter for the award ceremony.

In his acceptance speech for the Best TV Actor award, Ahsan Khan paid tribute to Mashal Khan, who was lynched by a charged mob over blasphemy allegations a few days earlier. During the ceremony, the Turkish actor Halit Ergenç was presented the International Icon award. It was the first time an international celebrity was honoured at the LSAs.

M. Nadeem J. was the TV director for LSA in 2017 and has been since 2005. He was also the producer of the show in 2017 and 2018.
