= Foodistan =

2012 Indian television cooking gameshow

- Title poster
- फ़ूडिस्तान فوڈستان
- Genre: Cooking
- Directed by: Various
- Presented by: Alyy Khan, Ira Dubey
- Judges: Merrilees Parker, Vir Sanghvi, Sonya Jehan
- Countries of origin: India; Pakistan
- Original languages: Predominantly English, Some Hindi and Urdu used

Production
- Executive producer: Monica Narula
- Editor: Various
- Production company: BIG Synergy

Original release
- Network: NDTV Good Times; Geo Entertainment
- Release: 23 January 2012 – 21 March 2013

Foodistan is a television cooking game show. It is produced by BIG Synergy for NDTV Good Times and Geo Entertainment. The show puts India and Pakistan's best chefs against each other in a competition. While their individual cuisines are similar, there are differences between the two cuisines. The show aired 26 episodes. The finale was between Manish Mehrotra from India and Poppy Agha from Pakistan; Manish Mehrotra walked away with the title of Foodistan.

== Hosts ==
- Alyy Khan
- Ira Dubey

== Contestants ==
The contestants represented both India and Pakistan and hailed from some renowned hotels groups.

=== India ===
Madhumita Mohanta, Nimish Bhatia, Mehraj Ul Haque, Karan Suri, Rajeev Arora, Sunil Chauhan, Manish Mehrotra, Girish Krishnan Monika Rajput

=== Pakistan ===
Amir Iqbal, Noor Khan, Poppy Agha, Akhtar Rehman, Muhammad Ikram, Mohammad Naeem, Mehmood Akhtar, Muhammad Saqib

Judges included the trio of Merrilees Parker from England, Sonia Jehan from Pakistan and Vir Sanghvi from India, along with some guest judges through the series.

== See also ==
- Sur Kshetra
- MasterChef India
- MasterChef Pakistan
