= Mah e Mir =

2016 film by Anjum Shahzad

- Theatrical release poster
- Directed by: Anjum Shahzad
- Written by: Sarmad Sehbai
- Story by: Sarmad Sehbai
- Produced by: Sahir Rasheed; Khurram Rana; Badar Ikram
- Starring: Fahad Mustafa; Iman Ali; Sanam Saeed; Alyy Khan; Manzar Sehbai; Syed Fazal Hussain
- Cinematography: Rana Kamran
- Edited by: Ehtasham Khan - Waqas Ali Khan
- Music by: Syed Shahi Hasan
- Production company: Miraqsm Media
- Distributed by: Eveready Pictures; Hum Films; Columbia Pictures
- Release date: 6 May 2016 (Pakistan)
- Running time: 150 minutes
- Country: Pakistan
- Language: Urdu
- Box office: Rs 22.5 million

Mah e Mir (Urdu: ماہ میر, lit. 'Moon of Mir') is a 2016 Pakistani biographical romantic drama film directed by Anjum Shahzad, produced by Khurram Rana, Sahir Rasheed, Badar Ikram and written by Sarmad Sehbai. The film is based on the life of the famous 18th-century Urdu poet Mir Taqi Mir, played by Fahad Mustafa. The film also stars Iman Ali, Sanam Saeed, Alyy Khan and Manzar Sehbai in lead roles. It was the official submission by the Pakistani Academy Selection Committee as the country's entry for the Best Foreign Language Film at the 89th Academy Awards, but it was not nominated.

Mah-e-Mir is a story that follows the struggle of a contemporary poet and draws parallels with the events in Mir's life. The film was co-distributed by Hum Films and Eveready Pictures on 6 May 2016 nationwide.

== Plot ==
The film follows Ahmed Jamal (Fahad Mustafa), a contemporary poet and columnist who is struggling with creative stagnation and emotional turmoil. Living in modern-day Pakistan, his best friend is Siraj (Paras Masroor). When Siraj comes to pick him up, Jamal asks why he seems to be in such a hurry, to which Siraj replies that he has to attend a fashion show. When they arrive, a television nearby is broadcasting a program on Urdu literature that features a discussion on the psychoanalysis of the classical poet Mir Taqi Mir.

The program includes a guest scholar, Dr. Kareem (Manzar Sehbai). Curious and somewhat irritated by the discussion, Siraj calls the show but Jamal insists on speaking instead. During the call, Jamal criticizes on the constant obsession with long-dead eighteenth-century poets while modern-day poets struggle to be heard or recognized. His blunt remarks disrupt the programs, forcing the host to abruptly end the segment, after which Dr. Kareem leaves the studio.

Witnessing the commotion, another modern day poet Naina Kamal (Sanam Saeed) approaches Jamal with a mocking tone, claiming she is a fan of his work. She hands him a collection of her "anti-ghazals" and asks him to read them before walking away. Later, Jamal asks Karam Elahi, the tea boy, to bring them Kebabs. Karam refuses, explaining that Jamal's tabs are unpaid and that the owner will become angry. Despite this, Karam admires Jamal and is inspired by his poetry. When he goes to settle the bill for Jamal, the owner scolds him about the unpaid tabs, but Karam explains that he will pay the amount from his own salary.

When traveling on a bus, he sees a girl in a white dress and becomes infatuated by her beauty. He gets off to follow her but loses her quickly. Later on, when Jamal gets to work, he sees Naina talking to Siraj who explains that Naina is getting a front page interview and that Jamal will be the one interviewing her. Jamal explains that he's not the interviewing type and leaves. At a book store, we see Dr. Kareem shuffling through books before finding one that reminds him of his past relationship.

At a literature conference, Jamal is asked to give a speech on present-day literature. The conference is attended by Dr. Kareem, Naina, and several other contemporary poets and scholars. During his speech, Jamal mocks modern day literature and falsely claims that he is constantly booked and busy with writing. During the event, Jamal notices the same woman he had seen on the bus. Before leaving, she writes on a piece of paper and slips away. Jamal reads the note, and finds that it contains a single line of poetry by Mir Taqi Mir. When he tries to follow her, she leaves in a rickshaw. Shortly afterward, Jamal receives a text message from her that contains another line from Mir's poetry. When he calls the number, she does not answer and instead sends him another poetic line.

The next day, Jamal talks about the encounter and admits that he is drawn to women even when they are modestly dressed. He recalls that the woman on the bus was wearing a hijab, yet he noticed her feet and felt attracted to her. Siraj jokes about this, mentioning toe fetishism and how poets in the eighteenth century would write extensively about even the smallest glimpses of women. Their discussion is interrupted by Naina saying that she could not read his column today before walking away. Angered that his column was not published, Jamal visits the editor and asks why the fashion show was reported instead of his column. The editor explains that he had warned him several times before and that his column is now closed.

Jamal then contacts several newspapers looking for work but to no avail. While leaving a building, he runs into Naina again, who asks why he looks so distraught. Jamal explains that the column he wrote about her has now been closed. Naina seems flattered and asks him to have coffee with her, to which Jamal agrees. During their conversation, Naina talks about how her poems and reputation have won over people in the media. When Jamal asks how, Naina reveals that it was not the editor who stopped his column, but her. Hearing this, Jamal leaves in anger.

After 2 months of no work, his landlord demands rent but Jamal asks for time to pay and has his electricity cut off as well due to which he angrily destroys his furniture. Jamal then goes out for a walk and sees the same woman once again in a white dress, he follows her into a shrine and sees her face before losing her in the crowd again. At the same time, Dr. Kareem recites Mir's poetry in his room having bought the book, he has visions of his father scolding him off his love for poetry before leaving.

Jamal, now suffering from writer's block, sits in his room scribbling various notes before angrily tearing them apart. Siraj calls him and asks why he did not come to the café. Jamal explains that he is unable to leave his house and asks Siraj to come over instead, bringing alcohol with him. When Siraj arrives, he asks why the windows are closed and why the room is messy. Jamal explains that he is fed up with the ugliness of the city and wants to hide in his room. He then recites poetry he has written, inspired by the woman he keeps seeing. Siraj tells him that he has fallen in love which is why his poetic style has changed. Jamal replies that he has written many poems similar to this one. Siraj then reveals that this is the last day he will be meeting Jamal, as he is leaving for Dubai the next day and is getting married soon. Jamal, seemingly angered by the news, throws a fit and asks Siraj to leave before eventually passing out from exhaustion.

Sometime later, Jamal is visited by Dr. Kareem. He explains that he has not seen Jamal at the café lately and mentions that an international publisher is looking for rising poets and wants Jamal's poems to be featured. Jamal asks why he is interested in his work, noting that Dr. Kareem did not seem impressed during the literature conference. Dr. Kareem explains that Jamal's essay focused on riwayat (themes) rather than the classical tradition. He adds that riwayat is derived from the idea of the classical and that many twenty-first-century postmodern writers use playful language to explain their themes, while Mirza Ghalib used the term "Shauqiya Ijad". He then gives Jamal a book titled Intikhab-e-Mir. When Jamal questions why he is being given a book about eighteenth-century poets, Dr. Kareem explains that anyone who writes about love without understanding Mir is walking on dangerous territory. He then hands Jamal a check for his poems and leaves. Jamal later begins reading the book. As he reads, the film shifts into a historical sequence in which Jamal imagines himself as Mir Taqi Mir.

In this vision, Mir is shown reciting his poetry in the court of a nawab (Aly Khan), where members of the court and courtesans(tawaifs) listen to his verses in eighteenth century Lucknow. Consequently, the head courtesan is also the same woman that Jamal has fallen for. After hearing his verses at the court, the head courtesan invites Mir to visit her quarters. When Mir arrives, the two speak privately and express their affection for one another. Their moment is interrupted by one of the courtesan's attendants. The attendant informs her that Nawab Sahab has sent jewelry and has requested that she perform in his court. The courtesan accepts the request. She then tells Mir that they cannot be together, explaining that he cannot offer her the wealth and gifts expected of someone in her position. Mir responds that while he may not have riches, he can dedicate countless diwans of poetry to her beauty before taking his leave.

Jamal feels disconnected from his work and increasingly alienated from the world around him. He opens the windows in his room and sees the woman again feeding pigeons on her roof. They meet eyes before Jamal leaves. At a bus stop, Dr. Kareem meets Jamal and asks him to sit in his car. He then takes him to a bookstore, where they meet Kareem's former partner, Zohra (Huma Nawab). Zohra initially mistakes Jamal for Kareem's son before Kareem explains that he is a modern-day poet. Jamal leaves them shortly afterward.

Zohra tells Kareem that he had once given her a book that she has since lost. Since they are meeting again after thirty years, she asks if they could have coffee together, and Kareem agrees. He later takes her to his home and apologizes for the past. Zohra recalls that they had once planned to leave together, but when Kareem did not arrive at the airport, she choose another flight and went away, though she had waited for him. After some time, Zohra decides to leave. Kareem asks her to stay for another drink, but when he briefly steps away, she wanders through the house. Entering his room, she notices that her old photographs are still displayed there, which moves her and prompts her to leave. When she reaches her car, Kareem thanks her for Visiting and gives her a book wrapped in white paper. She assumes it is his newest publication and drives away. On the way, she opens it and realizes that it is the same book he had given her thirty years earlier, now signed by him and containing their favourite quote.

Jamal visits a publisher in hopes of getting his latest poems published. The publisher suggests that poetry does not sell well and advises him to instead write a detective novel or a book about famous personalities. Jamal refuses, explaining that he has no interest in writing such material. At the same time, the narrative shifts to Mir in the court of Nawab Sahab. The Nawab is distracted, playing with fishes in a pond while Mir recites his poetry. Mir's verses are repeatedly interrupted, and the Nawab remarks that he might pay attention if Mir recites a line that truly interests him. Meanwhile, Jamal continues insisting to the publisher that he cannot write about personalities or produce a novel simply for commercial success. In the court, Mir responds that every line of his poetry holds meaning for those capable of understanding it. The Nawab takes offense at the remark, prompting Mir to apologize and say that he will return another time. Back at the publisher's office, Jamal is interrupted by the arrival of Naina Kanwal. The publisher then asks Jamal to leave his manuscript so that the board members can review it before making a decision about publication.

Jamal later visits Dr. Kareem to discuss the book he had given him. During their conversation, Jamal asks how Dr. Kareem interprets Mir's concept of Wahshat (Madness). Dr. Kareem explains it in terms of a kind of divine possession, saying that Mir uses the Kashish (pull) of the moon to reflect his wahshat in his poetry. Jamal responds that, by that logic, modern poetry could also be considered a form of wahsaht, an idea with which Dr. Kareem agrees. Kamal then asks why Kareem himself does not write about it. Kareem replies that it is not easy and that a person must experience the same emotional turmoil that Mir once endured. During the conversation. Kareem accidentally spills his drink on his clothes and leaves the room to change. While waiting, Jamal begins reading Dr. Kareem's book, after which the narrative shifts back to Mir's story.

Mir is later visited by Insha along with messengers from Nawab Sahab. They question why Mir did not stand to greet the Nawab earlier and why he has not visited the court in recent days. They also ask why he is no longer presenting new poetry like Sauda, whose work is gaining favor among the aristocrats. Mir responds that poetry should not belong only to aristocrats but to the common people, and that is why he writes. Insha mentions that Nawab has gifted him a thousand rupees and valuable jewelry. Mir replies that when he previously attended the Nawab's court, the Nawab seemed more interested in playing with fish and ducks than listening to poetry, and therefore he does not belong there. He asks that the money be instead given to the local mosque and the gifts can be kept. Insha warns him that continuing with such an attitude could bring trouble. Mir then declares that there is only one true poet, Mir Taqi Mir. Insha agrees but asks about Sauda, to which Mir replies that Sauda may be second, as he recites poetry for aristocrats while Mir recites for ordinary people sitting on the steps of mosques. INsha also mentions Khwaja Mir Dard and other poets, whom Mir ranks but criticizes the newer poets emerging from Delhi, comparing them to insects and saying that none of them match his caliber. Insha again advises him to be careful before their conversation is interrupted by wild dogs. Mir laughs and remarks that the aristocrats are worse than wild dogs.

The narrative then shifts back to the present day, where Dr. Kareem continues explaining the idea of Wahshat. He says that poetry has the power to drive a person mad if it is pursued deeply enough. Jamal responds that in the modern world poetry has become common in the marketplace and asks what value it holds for people who are hungry or homeless. Dr. Kareem replies that poetry consumes the soul of the poet and that today it is often treated like a commodity. He adds that Mir and Ghalib may no longer be alive, but their poetry continues to live on in a time where the old aristocratic culture no longer exists.

Mir later visits the court of the Nawab, who asks why he has not appeared there recently. Mir replies that he feels happier among ordinary people in the streets than in the Nawab's court. The Nawab responds by praising Sauda, saying that his poetry is as charming as beautiful courtesans. Mir remarks that not only are Sauda's words but he also dresses like one. When the Nawab asks what he means, Mir explains that Sauda does not truly love his poetry the way he does. Offended by the remark, the Nawab accuses Mir of being jealous of his favourite poet and angrily orders him to leave.

Later, the Nawab visits the head courtesan. During their conversation, he notices a book of Mir Taqi Mir's poetry and comments that Mir no longer attends his court but instead visit local gatherings. The courtesan replies that there is a great difference between royal courts and local gatherings, and that Mir writes about love and for the people who listen to him there. The Nawab asks whether Mir has won her affection. She replies that she is a tawaif and does not fall in love with anyone. The Nawab then proposes marriage, but she refuses, prompting him to leave.

In the present day, Jamal lights a cigarette outside a shop while a news broadcast reports on a suicide bombing that has killed several people. When he later goes to the café, he learns that Karam Elahi was among those who died in the attack. Distraught, Jamal speaks with the café, owner and asks to settle his unpaid tabs. The owner explains that the tabs have already been cleared, as Karam had been paying them from his own salary. Shaken by the news, Jamal walks away and begins imagining Mir walking beside him. In this vision, the scene shifts to Lucknow during a British attack, with bodies lying in the streets. Jamal starts writing and increasingly imagines himself as Mir at the same time. Hearing commotion outside, Jamal opens the window and sees the same woman he had been thinking about being taken away in marriage by another man. At the same time, in the parallel narrative, the head courtesan is shown dancing in the Nawab's court, mirroring Jamal's own sense of loss.

Heartbroken and disturbed, Jamal visits Dr. Kareem and asks about his extensive discussion of Mir's wahshat, questioning whether he has ever experienced the same ordeal himself. Kareem replies that everyone goes through Wahshat. Jamal presses him further, asking if that means there is a way to recover from it. In response. Dr. Kareem angrily claims that he does not truly know what wahshat is, hinting that he may have experienced it himself. Overwhelmed, Kareem collapses into a chair and asks Jamal to fetch his medicine from his room. When Jamal goes inside, he notices the room filled with Photographs of Zohra. Jamal returns with the medicine, after which Kareem asks him to leave. Jamal hesitates but eventually goes, while Kareem is left alone in tears.

Later, Jamal is seen walking through the streets under the pale blue light of the moon, suggesting that he too is being consumed by Wahshat. As he walks away, Dr. Kareem suffers a heart attack and dies.

The next day at the café, a television broadcast reports the news of Dr. Kareem's death. Jamal is approached by the publisher, who mentions Kareem and explains that the book Jamal left with him has now been published. He hands Jamal a check for it. Jamal then walks away again into the moonlight, seemingly accepting the state of wahshat.

== Cast ==
The film cast includes:

- Fahad Mustafa as Ahmad Jamal/Mir Taqi Mir
- Iman Ali as Mysterious girl/Mahtab Bai
- Sanam Saeed as Naina Kanwal
- Manzar Sehbai as Dr. Kaleem
- Huma Nawab as Kaleem's ex-wife
- Alyy Khan as Nawab Sahab
- Paras Masroor as Siraj
- Syed Fazal Hussain as Karam Elahi
- Rashid Farooqui as Nawaz

== Music ==
The music album launch ceremony was held in Dubai on 14 April 2016. The first song promo namely Us ka Kharam Dekh Kar was released the very next day. The second song Jaag Musafir was launched on 28 April at Beaconhouse National University followed by next song Ye Dhoan Sa was released on SoundCloud on 2 May.

== Production ==
In November 2013, Sarmad Sehbai told to The Express Tribune that his upcoming draws inspiration from an 18th century poet, but is set in the contemporary world. He further told that the film was written five years ago. The working title of the film was Poora Chand. The principal photography of the film began in the last quarter of 2013 in Karachi.

=== Marketing ===
The teaser trailer of film was released on 9 May 2014. On 23 March, first look poster of film was revealed followed by theatrical trailer the same night. The MaheMir team ran a decent promotional campaign visiting several institutes including Iqra University, Indus University and shows which includes Jeeto Pakistan, Morning Show Sitaray Ki Subah, Jago Pakistan Jago

== Release ==
Earlier, the film was scheduled to release on 6 November 2015 but it was postponed and was released on 5 May 2016 in U.A.E and in Pakistan on 6 May. The film was premiered in Karachi. It was given a Universal (U) rating by the Central Board of Film Censors (CBFC).

== Reception ==
=== Critical reception ===
The film received huge praise for its creativity as The Express Tribune described it as a "once in a blue moon film".

The film received good reviews from critics. Rafay Mahmood of The Express Tribune rated the film 4/5 stars and wrote, "Watch the film with your friends and family. It is worth your money and initiates a constructive discourse."

Mehreen Hasan of Dawn Images gave the film 4/5 stars and described it as "a rather prescient work that anticipates its every challenge in the box office, yet refuses to pander to what sells".

Lisa Tsering from The Hollywood Reporter stated, "The men's performances are strong throughout. Mustafa captures the inner fire of a misunderstood writer (though we never see him, you know, writing) and does a decent job in bringing the Urdu poetry-heavy dialogue to life. Sehbai adds gravitas to his role as the elder poetry professor, and Khan puts in a spirited performance as Nawab. The women do not fare as well — Saeed simpers through her annoyingly mannered performance as the empowered female poet, and Ali's face seems frozen into one expression as she delivers her lines in an unnaturally low growl."

The Nation praised the film's strengths, writing that "two things are clearly the movie's strength: Mir's poetry recitals (both in songs and background) and the cinematography of Karachi," and concluded that "Mah-e-Mir is a major step in the already rejuvenating Pakistani cinema. The movie is great from the subject to acting to direction."

Conversely, Ian Eldred of Daily Times was highly critical, writing that "a movie is not a poetry recitation nor is it a forum to express domineering didactic urges" and that "the production value, cinematography and the sound design are relatively decent but that is not enough to compensate for the gaping wounds that inhere in the structural body of this film."

Writing for The News International (TNS), the reviewer noted that "a thinking film that some reviewers have called 'torturous and boring' and others 'quite unnecessary' with still others commending it for the script written by Sarmad Sehbai but nothing else besides, the film has not gone unnoticed," and observed that "written in a sophisticated Persianised Urdu with poetry by Mir Taqi Mir that is both sung and recited, it is not a biopic or history drama but a mirror for the young poet to look into."

== Accolades ==
Award	Category	Recipient(s)	Result	Ref.
89th Academy Awards	Best Foreign Language Film	Mah-e-Mir	Submitted	
Guam International Film Festival	Best Narrative Film	Mah-e-Mir	Won	
Dada Saheb Phalke Film Festival	Best Feature Film	Mah-e-Mir	Won	
Dada Saheb Phalke Film Festival	Best Music	Syed Shahi Hasan	Won	
_{International Filmmaker Festival of World Cinema MILAN 2016 / Milan IFF 2016 Official}	Best Editing of a Foreign Language Film 2016	Ehtasham Khan - Waqas Ali Khan	Nominated	http://filmfestinternational.com/milan/
16th Lux Style Awards	Best Film	Sahir Rasheed, Khurram Rana & Badar Ikram	Nominated	
16th Lux Style Awards	Best Director	Anjum Shehzad	Nominated	
16th Lux Style Awards	Best Actor	Fahad Mustafa	Nominated	
16th Lux Style Awards	Best Supporting Actor	Manzar Sehbai	Nominated	
16th Lux Style Awards	Best Male Singer – "Piya Dekhan Ko"	Shafqat Amanat Ali	Nominated	
16th Lux Style Awards	Best Male Singer – "Ye Dhuan"	Rajab Ali Khan	Nominated	
3rd Galaxy Lollywood Awards	Best Director	Anjum Shehzad	Nominated	
3rd Galaxy Lollywood Awards	Best Story	Sarmad Sehbai	Nominated	
3rd Galaxy Lollywood Awards	Best Actor in a Negative Role	Sanam Saeed	Nominated	
3rd Galaxy Lollywood Awards	Best Choreography – "Uska Kharam"	Papu Samrat	Nominated	
3rd Galaxy Lollywood Awards	Best On Screen Couple	Fahad Mustafa & Iman Ali	Nominated	
47th Nigar Awards	Best Film	Sahir Rasheed, Khurram Rana & Badar Ikram	Postponed	
47th Nigar Awards	Best Actor	Fahad Mustafa	Postponed	
47th Nigar Awards	Best Supporting Actor	Manzar Sehbai	Postponed	
47th Nigar Awards	Best Debut Director	Anjum Shehzad	Postponed	
47th Nigar Awards	Best Actor in a Negative Role	Sanam Saeed	Postponed	
47th Nigar Awards	Best Story	Sarmad Sehbai	Postponed	
47th Nigar Awards	Best Dialogue	Sarmad Sehbai	Postponed	
47th Nigar Awards	Best Choreographer	Papu Samrat	Postponed	

== See also ==
- List of Pakistani films of 2016
- List of submissions to the 89th Academy Awards for Best Foreign Language Film
- List of Pakistani submissions for the Academy Award for Best International Feature Film
