= Shorr =

Indian television drama series

- Genre: Drama
- Created by: R M Joshi
- Written by: R M Joshi; Mitesh Shah; Swati Shah; Tushar Joshi
- Directed by: Sahil Sharma; Sanjay Zavuri; Rajesh Sharma
- Starring: See below
- No. of episodes: 222

Production
- Producers: Jay Mehta; Kinnari Mehta
- Camera setup: Multi-camera
- Running time: Approx. 24 minutes
- Production company: Jay Production

Original release
- Network: Sahara One
- Release: 14 June 2010 – 3 June 2011

Shorr (transl. Noise) is an Indian television drama series that aired on Sahara One. The series follow the story of speech-impaired girl named Kanku. The series premiered on 14 June 2010 and is produced by Jay Mehta.

== Cast ==
- Snigdha Srivastava as Kanku
- Yasir Shah as Munjal Mahendra Sanghani
- Raj Chhabriya as Mohan
- Roopa Divetia as Pankor Sanghani (Pan Ba)
- Tej Pawa as Dilip
- Rachayita Agrawal as Harsha
- Trishna Vivek as Kaveri
- Neetha Shetty as Aatma
- Aman Verma as Sarang
- Megha Joshi as Vidya Mukund Sanghani
- Sunny Pancholi as Mukund Mahendra Sanghani
- Kishori Shahane as Rudrani Devi
- Sonia Shah as Charubala Mahendra Sanghani, Munjal's Mother
- Mehul buch as Mahendra pankor Sanghani, Munjal's Father
- Adarsh Gautam as Mahendra's brother
- unknown person as Bhulibaai
- unknown person as Radhika
