= Yasir Shah (actor) =

Pakistani actor

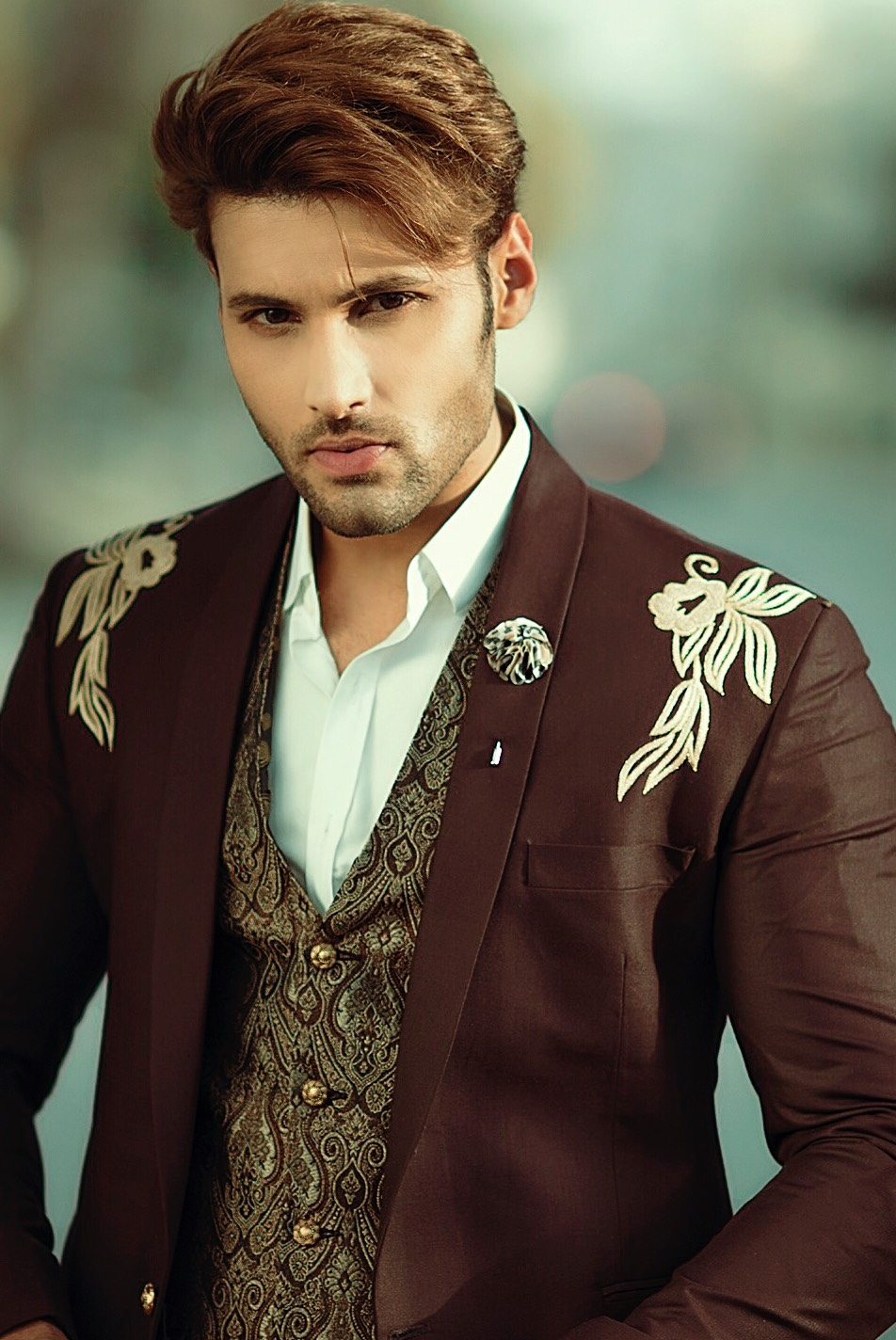
- Yasir, Karachi (2017)
- Born: Syed Yasir Shah; 6 September 1987 (age 39); Dubai, UAE
- Occupations: Actor; Model; Producer; Screenwriter
- Years active: 2006 - present

Syed Yasir Shah is a Pakistani actor, producer, screenwriter and model who started his acting career in India.

== Career ==
=== Early television career in India ===
After doing modelling gigs in Pakistan, he was offered a role by Ekta Kapoor of Balaji Telefilms, the protagonist Azaan Khan in the serial Khwaish (2007), aired on Sony TV, a drama based on an Indian Muslim family in Dubai, which has been a major success and thus marked his debut in India's television industry.

In one of his popular roles in Indian dramas he played the role of Munjaal in the Sahara One TV drama Shorr (2010) as serial protagonist.

Since 2019, he has been exclusively active in Pakistan's entertainment industry, following the ban imposed by The All India Cine Workers Association (AICWA) on Pakistani artists, which prevents them from working in the Indian film industry.

=== Films ===
Yasir Shah made his film debut with the 2016 Pakistani movie Blind Love.

=== Production and screenwriting ===
In 2019, he turned producer as well as screenwriter with the Aaj Entertainment drama Rangdari.

== Filmography ==
=== Television series ===
Year	Serial	Role	Producer	Screenwriter	Production house	Channel	Country
2007	Khwaish	Azaan			Balaji Telefilms	Sony TV	India
2007	Jiya Jale	Yug Suryavanshi			Big Synergy	9X	India
2007	Tujh Sang Preet Lagai Sajna (Star Plus)	Siddharth			Balaji Telefilms	STAR Plus	India
2007	Buri Aurat	Yasir			7th Sky Entertainment	Geo TV	Pakistan
2010	Shorr	Munjaal			Jay Production	Sahara One	India
2011	Thoda Hai Bas Thode Ki Zaroorat Hai	Sambhavv			Rose Audio visuals	Colors	India
2011	Mahima Shani Dev Ki	Ashwabahu			Sagar Films	NDTV Imagine	India
2012	Adaalat	Gaurang			Contiloe Entertainment	Sony TV	India
2012	Ek Maa Ki Agniparkisha	Vikraam			Doordarshan		India
2012	Tere Pyaar Kay Bharose	Ubaid			7th Sky Entertainment	Express Entertainment	Pakistan
2013	Bewafa Hum Na Thay	Nomi			Mushroom Productions	TVOne Global	Pakistan
2013	Khoya Khoya Chand	Farooq			Moomal Productions	Hum TV	Pakistan
2014	Yeh Hai Aashiqui	Shadab			BBC Worldwide	Bindass	India
2014	Dil Nahi Maanta	Raza			iDream Entertainment	ARY Digital	Pakistan
2014	Tumse Mil Kay	Mehroz			iDream Entertainment	ARY Digital	Pakistan
2015	Rishton Ki Dor	Kabeer			A&B Entertainment	Geo TV	Pakistan
2016	Rishta Anjana Sa	Rahil			Six Sigma	ARY Digital	Pakistan
2017	Saanp Seerhi	No		Yes	Misbah Khalid Productions	Express Entertainment	Pakistan
2017	Khan	Haroon			7th Sky Entertainment	Geo Entertainment	Pakistan
2017	Iltija	Razi			Next Level Entertainment	ARY Digital	Pakistan
2019	Rangdari	Rehan	Yes	Yes	RAS Film	Aaj Entertainment	Pakistan
2020	Rockstar	Aazaan	Yes		RAS Film & Yasir Shah Films	TvOne	Pakistan
2021	Khudgharziyan	Arsalan			A&B Entertainment	SAB TV	Pakistan
2024	Bhakt Hazari	Ali				PTV	Pakistan

=== Telefilms ===
Year	Title	Role	Ref.
2014	Tujhsay Hee Raabta	Farhan	
2016	Dulha Mil Gaya	Zaid Malik	
2017	Love Youn Bhi Hota Hai	Hasnain	

=== Film ===
Year	Film	Role	Language
2016	Blind Love	Daniyal	Urdu

=== Web series ===
Year	Title	Role	Network
2022	Ranjish	Farhan	ABK Films

== Awards and nominations ==
Year	Award	Category	Result	Title	Ref.
2017	47th Nigar Awards	Best Debut Male	Nominated	Blind Love	
2022	Nation's Leader Awards	Best On Screen Face (Male) of The Year NLA 2.0	Won	—N/a	
