= Dance Kahani =

- Theatrical poster
- Directed by: Omar Hassan
- Written by: Omar Hassan
- Screenplay by: Shabbir Siraj
- Produced by: Zahir Ali and Omar Hassan
- Starring: Madeleine Hanna; Alamdar Khan; Vernin U'chong
- Cinematography: Asrad Khan
- Edited by: Ahmed Ali
- Music by: Usman Bin Sohail
- Production companies: OSCO FILMS; 99 FILMS; Ion Entertainment
- Distributed by: Summit Entertainment
- Release date: 5 August 2016 (Pakistan)
- Country: Pakistan
- Languages: Urdu, English
- Box office: Rs1.5 crore

Dance Kahani (meaning dance story; previously The Dance Diaries) is a 2016 Pakistan's first dance film directed and written by Omar Hassan. Dance Kahani is produced by OSCO FILMS, 99 FILMS and Ion Entertainment in association with Act One. The film stars Madeleine Hanna, Alamdar Khan and Vernin U'chong. Dance Kahani is the first film exploring the underground dance culture and free running on the streets of Karachi.

== Plot outline ==
"With her dream of pursuing a professional dance career shattered, she must now fight the odds to keep it alive in a society she never wanted to be a part of." This is how Nizzy, an upscale British Pakistani, must survive her predicament.

== Cast ==
- Madeleine Hanna as Nuzhat/Nizzy
- Vernin U'chong as Tipu
- Alamdar Khan as Shobby
- Abdul Ghani as Jo
- Shezi Khan as Saadi
- Ramiz Law as Silent Sid
- Abdul Rahim Langove as Sam
- Ali Parkour as Adnan/Eddie
- Irfan as Aamir
- Imran Shaukat as Jawed Ali
- Rahid Sami as Anwer Ali
- Sabiha Zia as Qurat ul Ain/Annie
- Talat as Asma Jawed
- Niggy Imtiaz as Feroza Anwer
- Barkat Ali as Sunny
- Asifa Ataka as Farida Junaid
- Sajjad Ali as Rickshaw Driver
- Farhan Baig - guest appearance

== Production ==
The film was shot on RED using Carl Zeiss lenses, despite being an independent low budget initiative by a new generation filmmaker from Pakistan. The movie illustrates aspiration, dreams, and talent against the odds.

== Release ==
=== Marketing ===
A film teaser was released on 6 April 2014 along with an official theatrical poster. The movie is also expected to release later in 2015. The character poster featuring Tipu was revealed on 14 November 2015. First look promo of film was revealed online on 17 November. Theatrical trailer was revealed on social media website on 9 July 2016.

== See also ==
- List of Pakistani films of 2016
- Dance films
