= Akhara (TV series) =

2024 Pakistani television series

- Genre: Sports drama; Romance
- Written by: Shahid Dogar
- Directed by: Anjum Shahzad
- Starring: Feroze Khan; Sonya Hussyn; Srha Asghar
- Country of origin: Pakistan
- Original language: Urdu
- No. of episodes: 34

Production
- Production company: Multiverse Entertainment

Original release
- Network: Green Entertainment
- Release: 10 January 2024 – 2024

Akhara is a Pakistani television series directed by Anjum Shahzad. It stars Feroze Khan and Sonya Hussyn in lead roles, alongside Srha Asghar, Waseem Abbas, Shamoon Abbasi and Yasra Rizvi. It premiered on Green Entertainment on 10 January 2024.

== Cast ==
- Feroze Khan as Dilsher
- Sonya Hussyn as Sitara
- Srha Asghar as Hajra
- Hina Afridi as Reshma
- Shamoon Abbasi as Dastageer
- Kashif Hussain as Rustom
- Faraz Farooqui as Sultan
- Shahzad Nawaz as Shahnawaz
- Nazar ul Hassan as Chaudhary Riyasat Ali
- Waseem Abbas as Hakim
- Erum Akhtar as Mehrunnisa
- Yasra Rizvi as Ashu
- Nida Mumtaz
- Srha Asghar
- Naima Khan

== Reception ==
In a review published in Dawn on 14 April 2024, the newspaper described the series as one of Shahid Dogar's more consistent scripts. The review praised Feroze Khan's portrayal of Dilsher and highlighted performances by Hina Afridi and Waseem Abbas. However, it criticised Sonya Hussyn's character as poorly written and described her character's feelings towards the two male leads as confusing. It also expressed concern that the storyline risked becoming repetitive because of its frequent fight sequences.
