= Ho Mann Jahaan =

2016 Pakistani film by Asim Raza

- Theatrical release poster
- ہو من جہاں
- Directed by: Asim Raza
- Written by: Asim Raza
- Screenplay by: Rashna Abidi; Imtisal Abbasi
- Produced by: Sheheryar Munawar; Asim Raza
- Starring: Adeel Hussain; Mahira Khan; Sonya Jehan; Sheheryar Munawar
- Cinematography: Salman Razzaq Khan
- Edited by: Amir Saif
- Music by: Zebunissa Bangash; Atif Aslam; Faakhir Mehmood; Taha Malik
- Production company: The Vision Factory Films
- Distributed by: ARY Films
- Release dates: 31 December 2015 (UAE); 1 January 2016 (Pakistan)
- Running time: 170 minutes
- Country: Pakistan
- Language: Urdu

Ho Mann Jahaan (Urdu: ہو من جہاں 'What the Heart Wills') is a 2015 Pakistani coming of age musical drama film, written and directed by Asim Raza in his directorial debut. The screenplay was written by Rashna Abdi, Imtisal Abbasi and Asim Raza, while dialogues were written by Asim Raza, Imtisal Abbasi, Rashna Abdi and Yasir Hussain. The film stars Adeel Hussain, Mahira Khan, Sheheryar Munawar and Sonya Jehan, along with veterans Bushra Ansari, Arshad Mahmud, Jamal Shah and Munawar Siddiqui as part of the cast. It is produced in Urdu.

The film was released in the Middle East on 31 December 2015 by ARY Films and in Pakistan on 1 January 2016.

== Plot ==
Ho Mann Jahaan is a coming of age urban story set in present-day Karachi, revolving around three friends, Arhan (Sheheryar Munawar), Manizeh (Mahira Khan), and Nadir (Adeel Hussain) whose friendship is born out of shared experiences, a passion for music, and an aspiration for fame. The film reflects the dichotomy in society where individuals seek to exercise free will but are readily drawn to conformity, with parents imposing restrictions because they love their children but at times do not understand them. Arhan comes from a lower-middle-class family and has a strained relationship with his retired government servant father, while Nadir is from a privileged background and is an obedient son and good student. Manizeh lives with her artist mother, as her father once a musician left them and music for religious reasons. The narrative charts their trials and triumphs as they transition from college life to the daunting world of adulthood and its inherent responsibilities, with Sonya Jehan playing Sabina, a powerful independent character symbolising strength and wisdom.

== Cast ==
- Mahira Khan as Manizeh
- Adeel Hussain as Nadir
- Sheheryar Munawar as Arhan
- Sonya Jehan as Sabina
- Bushra Ansari as Nadir's mother
- Arshad Mehmood as Nadir's father
- Nimra Bucha as Shahida
- Jamal Shah as Manizeh's father
- Munawar Siddiqui as Arhan's father
- Fawad Khan (cameo appearance) as Rafael
- Zeb Bangash (cameo appearance) as Xenovia
- Hamza Ali Abbasi (cameo appearance) as Malang Baba
- Syra Yousuf (cameo appearance) in the "Shakar Wandaan" Song
- Bilal Maqsood (cameo appearance)
- Faisal Kapadia (cameo appearance)
- Zoheb Hassan (cameo appearance)
- Ahmed Ali Akbar (extended cameo)
- Ali Zia Naqvi (cameo appearance)
- Syed Faizan Ali (cameo appearance)

== Production ==
The film was primarily shot in Karachi, and some parts were shot in the northern areas of Pakistan. The film was shot using two Alexa cameras with two camera units. The film's first teaser was released on 25 March 2015 where the cast and crew got together for a press event at the film's largest and one of the industry's most expensive sets.

== Soundtrack ==
The soundtrack was digitally released on 1 November 2015. It comprises a total of ten songs by various artists. The album contains only three original tracks, written by Asim Raza; the rest of the songs were re-recorded by artists who had previously performed them. The album was produced by Faakhir and Ehtisham Malick at ET studios. The song "Khush Piya" was dedicated to Malika Pukhraj by Tina Sani.

=== Track listing ===
No.	Title	Lyrics	Singer(s)	Length
1.	"Barish"	Jimmy Khan	Jimmy Khan	3:55
2.	"Mann Ke Jahan"	Asim Raza	Zebunnisa Bangash	4:12
3.	"Ghar Nari"	Amir Khusrau	Fareed Ayaz	4:48
4.	"Dil Kare"	Asim Raza	Atif Aslam	3:31
5.	"Dil Pagla"	Asim Raza	Zebunnisa Bangash	4:34
6.	"Dosti"	Zoheb Hassan	Zoheb Hassan and Zebunnisa Bangash	3:38
7.	"Khush Piya Waseen"	Khwaja Ghulam Farid	Tina Sani	4:19
8.	"Sarak Sarak"	Mai Dhai Band	Mai Dhai	3:25
9.	"Shakar Wandan"	Afzal Sahir	Asrar	3:46
10.	"The Audition"	Louis J. Pinto	Louis J. Pinto (Gumby)	1:12

== Release ==
The film was originally scheduled to be released on the holiday of Eid al-Azha on 25 September 2015, but was rescheduled for release on 1 January 2016. It was also screened at the first-ever Pakistan Film Festival in New York City, held from December 3–4, 2016, at the Asia Society.

== Reception ==
=== Critical reception ===
The film generally received mixed reviews. Rafay Mahmood of The Express Tribune rated it 2 out of 5 stars and criticised its script and camera work, saying: "Ho Mann Jahaan is a failed marriage between advertisement and film, and the rest is just too long to sit and absorb." Hamna Zubair of Dawn News praised its well-selected cast and their acting. She also praised its strong-hitting social message and wrote: "Ho Mann Jahaan succeeds in its aim to entertain, and I'm happy for everyone involved. Go watch the film, you'll like it." Fatima Aleem of The Nation gave it a rating of 7 out of 10 and praised the film's content, marking that: "Movie had a good lesson for parents to let their children choose the career line they want to opt rather than compelling them to fulfill their dreams and live a life they never wished for." The editor of Dunya News praised the direction but criticised its predictable storyline and mainly praised Sheheryar Munawar's acting, but pointed out more negatives than positives. Ujala Ali Khan of The National highly praised the film, writing: "A highly relatable story featuring likeable characters, teamed with great performances by both the lead and supporting actors, makes for an easy, pleasant viewing experience." Galaxy Lollywood rated it 3 out of 5 stars and wrote: "Good performances by the lead actors, great music, some special guest appearances and a slowly moving plot await you. It's not the best that Pakistani Cinema has offered, but then it's not the worst either." The Friday Times criticised the film as part of a category of films that "arrives with a loud roll of drums, promises a lot and delivers nothing but the ordinary," noting that "the movie which lasted for 2 hours and 50 minutes seemed to drag on forever."

=== Accolades ===
Ceremony	Won	Nominated
16th Lux Style Awards	Mahira Khan – Best Actress; Sheheryar Munawar – Best Supporting Actor	Sheheryar Munawar and Asim Raza – Best Film; Asim Raza – Best Director; Sonya Jehan – Best Supporting Actress; Zeb Bangash – Best Female Singer for "Dil Pagla"; Tonight Us and Jimmy Khan – Best Song of the Year for "Barish"; Mai Dhai Band – Best Song of the Year for "Sarak Sarak"; Asrar – Best Song of the Year for "Shakar Wandaan"
3rd Galaxy Lollywood Awards	Mahira Khan – Best Actor in a Leading Role Female; Sheheryar Munawar – Best Actor in a Supporting Role Male; Sheheryar Munawar – Best Male Debut; Asrar – Best Playback Singer Male for "Shakar Wandaan"; Zebunnisa Bangash, Atif Aslam and Faakhir Mehmood – Best Music; "Shakar Wandaan" – Song of the Year; Nigah Hussain – Best Choreography for "Shakar Wandaan"; Adeel Hussain, Mahira Khan and Sheheryar Munawar – Best Dance Performance for "Shakar Wandaan"; Fawad Khan – Best Special Appearance; Mahira Khan and gang singing at Coke Studio with Zohaib Hassan – Cinematic Moment of the Year	Sheheryar Munawar and Asim Raza – Best Film; Asim Raza – Best Director; Adeel Hussain – Best Male Debut; Zeb Bangash – Best Playback Singer Female for "Dil Pagla"; Sonya Jehan – Best Actor in a Supporting Role Female
1st International Pakistan Prestige Awards		Sheheryar Munawar and Asim Raza – Best Film; Asim Raza – Best Director; Sheheryar Munawar – Best Actor Film; Mahira Khan – Best Actress Film; Asrar – Best Singer Male/Female for "Shakar Wandaan"; Sonya Jehan – Best Actor in a Supporting Role Male/Female
47th Nigar Awards	The awards were postponed and did not take place	Sheheryar Munawar and Asim Raza – Best Film; Mahira Khan – Best Actress; Sonya Jehan – Best Supporting Actress; Adeel Hussain – Best Debut Male; Sheheryar Munawar – Best Debut Male; Zebunnisa Bangash, Ehtesham Malik and Faakhir Mehmood – Best Music Director; Asrar – Best Playback Singer Male for "Shakar Wandaan"; Mai Dhai – Best Playback Singer Female for "Sarak Sarak"; Asim Raza – Best Debut Director; Asim Raza – Best Story; Nigah Hussain – Best Choreographer; Salman Razzaq Khan – Best Cinematography

== See also ==
- List of Pakistani films of 2016
