= Blind Love (2016 film) =

- Theatr4ical release poster
- Directed by: Faisal Bukhari
- Written by: M Pervaiz Kaleem
- Produced by: Mian Amjad Farzand; CH.Zulfiqar Ahmed; CH.Ijaz Kamran
- Starring: Yasir Shah; Nimra Khan; Aamir Qureshi; Fawad Jalal; Mathira; Imran Bukhari
- Cinematography: Syed Ali Bukhari
- Production company: Producers Alliance
- Distributed by: IMGC Global Entertainment
- Release date: 5 August 2016 (Pakistan)
- Country: Pakistan
- Language: Urdu
- Box office: Rs0.65 crore

Blind Love is a 2016 Pakistani romantic film directed by Faisal Bukhari. The film has been written by M Pervaiz Kaleem. The film stars Yasir Shah and Nimra Khan in the main lead with Fawad Jalal, Aamir Qureshi, Imran Bukhari and Mathira as supporting actors.

== Plot ==
The story starts in the city of Lahore, where three friends Daniyal (Yasir Shah), Nomi (Imran Bukhari) and Baba (Aamir Qureshi) plan the biggest bank robbery in the city's history. They put their masks on proceed to rob the bank. During the robbery, a girl named Sara (Nimra Khan) who is the bank manager gets injured. She survives the injuries but loses her eyesight. Daniyal learns that he and his gang are responsible for Sara's lost eyesight. Amid his guilt and concern for her, he falls in love with Sara. Neither of them are aware that a police inspector (Fawad Jalal) is continuing to investigate who ran over Sara and would soon conclude that the suspect is none other than Daniyal and his gang.

Daniyal, a gangster helps Sara, a blind girl in fulfilling her dream but will she ever know that the Reason of losing her eyesight was Daniyal?

Watch as events unfold on 5 August 2016 and the impact this will have on Daniyal and Sara.

== Cast ==
- Yasir Shah as Daniyal
- Nimra Khan as Sara
- Aamir Qureshi as Baba
- Malik Naseer
- Fawad Jalal as Inspector
- Mathira (Special Appearance)
- Imran Bukhari as Nomi

== Production ==
The film is the debut of Yasir Shah as a film actor.

== Release ==
The film trailer was released on 24 May 2016 and the movie was set for release on Eid al-Fitr but due to lack of screens on Eid, film was postponed. It was released on 5 August 2016 in cinemas all across Pakistan.

== Awards and nominations ==
Year	Award	Category	Name	Result	Ref.
2016	47th Nigar Awards	Best Debut Male	Yasir Shah	Nominated	
2016	47th Nigar Awards	Best Debut Female	Nimra Khan	Nominated	
2016	47th Nigar Awards	Best Actor In a Negative Role	Aamir Qureshi	Nominated	
2016	47th Nigar Awards	Best Screenplay	Muhammad Pervez Kalim	Nominated	
2016	47th Nigar Awards	Best Cinematography	Ali Bukhari	Nominated	

== See also ==
- List of Pakistani films of 2016
