= Asrar (musician) =

Pakistani singer-songwriter from Lahore

Asrar اسرار
- Born: Syed Asrar Shah; 20 April 1985 (age 41); Azad Kashmir, Pakistan
- Origin: Lahore, Punjab, Pakistan
- Genres: Punjabi, Sufi rock, Pop
- Occupations: Singer, songwriter, composer, music director.
- Instruments: Vocals, guitar, ukulele
- Years active: 2011–present
- Label: Coke Studio Pakistan
- Website: https://asrar.pk

Syed Asrar Shah better known as Asrar (born 20 April 1985) is a Pakistani singer-songwriter, musician, composer and writer based in Lahore. He is known for his Bollywood debut with Afghan Jalebi in the 2015 film Phantom.

== Early life and education ==
Asrar was born on 20 April 1985 in Azad Kashmir. In 1992, his family moved to Hyderabad, Sindh, and in 2007 then to Lahore, in Punjab. From an early age, he was inspired by Sufi music and started writing his songs.

Asrar received training from Ustad Sultan Ahmed Khan in Hyderabad then in 2007 he moved to Lahore where he participated and stood first in Pakistan Musical Conference.

== Career ==
In 2011 he released his debut single "Nai Saiyyo". He joined the television program Coke Studio in 2014 and released his song "Sub Aakho Ali Ali" during the show.

He made his Bollywood debut in July 2015 with a song Afghan Jalebi for the film Phantom.

In 2018 he recorded a track from Bang-e-Dara by Muhammad Iqbal, "Tere Ishq Ki Inteha Chahta Hoon".

Asrar has also started his own music production company named Soul Speaks and Raagbaaz.

He also sang for famous Pakistani drama serials Cheekh and Parizaad's OST.

== Discography ==
Year	Song	Music	Other notes
Singles
2018	"Mast Hua"	J Ali	Audiam
2018	"Lajpaal Ali"	J Ali	Director: Shani Zee
2018	"Sag e Ali"	J Ali	Director: Abdullah
2018	"Elia"	Asrar & Majid Raza	Director: Adnan Tariq
2018	"Murshad"	Asrar & Majid Raza	Director: Adnan Tariq
2018	"Sab Ki Khair"	J Ali	Raagbaaz Production
2018	"O Mastanay"	J Ali	
2018	"Ni Saiyo"	J Ali	Directed By, Nauman Saeed
2018	"Nasha Nasha"	J Ali	
2018	"Malango"	J Ali	Raagbaaz Productions
2019	"Chattan"	Asrar & Majid Raza	Directed by, Adnan Tariq
2019	"Ishq Hawa mean"	J Ali	Lyrics: Wasi Shah
2019	"Hussain Tha, Hussain Hai"	Asrar & Majid Raza	
2020	Chaachi Maasi	Asrar & Majid Raza	Director: Majid Raza
2020	"Ibn-E-Mariyam"	Asrar & Majid Raza	Director: Majid Raza
2021	"Desi Wedding Ho Rahi Hai"	Asrar & Majid Raza	Crimson X Saira Shakira
2021	"Nijat"	Asrar & Majid Raza	Director and Cinematographer: Imran Javed
2021	"Quaid Ka Pakistan"	J Ali	
2022	"Ni Main sadkay"	Asrar & Majid Raza	Director: Majid Raza
2022	"Malang	Asrar & Raafay Israr	Bisconni Music
2023	Apan Dono	Asrar & Majid Raza	Director: Adnan Tariq
Coke Studio & Others
2014	"Sab Akho Ali Ali"	Coke Studio, Season 7	Solo
2014	"Shakar Wandaan Re"	Coke Studio, Season 7	Solo
2017	"Lajpaal Ali"	Pepsi Battle of the Bands, Season 2	Solo
2018	"Gaddiye"	Coke Studio, Season 11	Attaullah Khan Esakhelvi
2018	"Wah Jo Kalaam"	Coke Studio, Season 11	Shamu Bai & Vishnu
Films
2015	"Afghan Jalebi (Ya Baba)"	Phantom	Bollywood movie
2015	"Bhaag Ja"	Wrong No.	Pakistani film
2016	"Shakar Wandan"	Ho Mann Jahaan	Pakistani film
2016	"Funkaraan"	Actor in Law	Pakistani film
2016	Dekh Magar Pyaar Say	Dekh Magar Pyaar Say	Pakistani film
2017	"Bulleya"	Rangreza	Pakistani film
2018	Khotay Da Putar	The Donkey King	Pakistani film
2019	"Peedaan"	Swaarangi	Pakistani film

== See also ==
- Sufi music
- Pakistani pop music
- Pakistani Sufism
- Coke Studio Pakistan (Season 7)
