= Saima =

Saima can be a feminine given name of Arabic origin or a Finnish feminine given name. Notable people with the name include:

== Given name ==
- Saima Agha, Pakistani politician
- Saima Akhtar Bharwana (born 1969), Pakistani politician
- Saima Akram Chaudhry (born 1985), Pakistani screenwriter
- Saima Harmaja (1913–1937), Finnish poet and writer
- Saima Kanwal, Pakistani politician
- Saima Karimova (1926–2013), Russian geologist
- Saima Manzoor (born 1981), Pakistani badminton player
- Saima Mohsin (born 1977), freelance journalist
- Saima Nadeem, Pakistani politician
- Saima Noor (often billed as Saima, born 1967), Pakistani film actress
- Saima Qureshi (born 1978), Pakistani actress
- Saima Razzaq, British political activist and educator
- Saima Saleem, Pakistani civil servant
- Saima Shoukat (born 1984), Pakistani squash player
- Saima Thakor (born 1996), Indian cricketer
- Saima Tiik (born 1957), Estonian athletics competitor
- Saima Wazed (born 1972), daughter of Bangladesh's former prime minister Sheikh Hasina

== See also ==
- Saima (1844–1846), a Swedish language newspaper in Finland
- Saimaa, a lake in southeastern Finland
