= Madhumati Mitra =

Judge of the Calcutta High Court, West Bengal, India

Hon'ble Ms. Justice (Retd.) Madhumati Mitra

Judge of the Calcutta High Court
- In office 12 October 2018 – 30 May 2020
- Nominated by: Ranjan Gogoi
- Appointed by: Ram Nath Kovind

Personal details
- Born: 31 May 1958 (age 68)
- Education: University of Delhi

Madhumati Mitra (born 31 May 1958) is a former judge of the Calcutta High Court, in West Bengal, India. She briefly served as the registrar of the National University of Juridical Sciences as well as of the Calcutta High Court before being appointed as a judge at the High Court. During her tenure as a High Court judge, she adjudicated in a number of significant cases, including in litigation concerning the Saradha Group financial scandal.

== Career ==
Mitra joined the West Bengal Judicial Service in 1987 and adjudicated in civil and criminal courts, as well as in special courts constituted to try offences under the Prevention of Corruption Act and the Narcotic Drugs and Psychotropic Substances Act. She was the district and sessions judge and the chair of the district legal services authority in Purba Medinapur. Mitra was additionally deputed to advise the West Bengal and Andaman & Nicobar governments on legal issues, acting as a deputy secretary for law. She was appointed as the Registrar-General of the Calcutta High Court in 2017.

As an additional-sessions judge, Mitra adjudicated in the case concerning the widely reported Netai massacre, in which nine persons were killed, allegedly by Maoist insurgents.

In 2018, Mitra was appointed as the registrar of the National University of Juridical Sciences in West Bengal, replacing two acting registrars who had briefly occupied the post earlier that year. Mitra held the appointment for three months before resigning. She became an additional judge of the Calcutta High Court on 12 October 2018. Her appointment was made permanent in April 2020.

In 2019, Mitra was one of several judges who adjudicated in litigation concerning the widely reported Saradha Group financial scandal. She refused to grant protection from arrests to the former Kolkata Commissioner of Police, Rajeev Kumar, during these proceedings, holding that his status as a former police officer did not afford him any special privileges during the investigation. In June 2019, Mitra wrote a notable judgment that established the principle that orders of maintenance granted before divorce under the Domestic Violence Act, would continue to be enforced after divorce if the "divorced wife" in question was unable to support herself.

Mitra retired from the Calcutta High Court on 30 May 2020.

== Life ==
Mitra completed her undergraduate education at Serampore College, earning a B.A., and then earned an LL.B. and LL.B. from the University College of Law in Kolkata, West Bengal.
