= Zindagi Kitni Haseen Hay =

2016 Pakistani film by Anjum Shahzad

- Theatrical release poster
- Urdu: زندگی کتنی حسین ہے
- Directed by: Anjum Shahzad
- Written by: Abdull Khaaliq Khan
- Produced by: Rafiq Ahmed Chaudary; Fahmeeda Abdull Khaliq; Jahanzaib Quadir; Kamran Siddiqui
- Starring: Sajal Ali; Feroze Khan
- Cinematography: Asif Khan
- Edited by: Ehtesham Khan (ET); Waqas Ali Khan
- Music by: SOCH; Sohail Haider; Farhan Shah
- Production companies: RC Films; Kingfisher Films
- Distributed by: Geo Films
- Release date: 13 September 2016 (Pakistan); (Eid ul Adha)
- Running time: 150 minutes
- Country: Pakistan
- Language: Urdu
- Budget: Rs. 4 crore (US$140,000)
- Box office: Rs. 3 crore (US$110,000)

Zindagi Kitni Haseen Hay (ZKHH) (Urdu: زندگی کتنی حسین ہے, lit. 'Life is so beautiful') is a 2016 Pakistani romantic drama film directed by Anjum Shahzad, written by Abdul Khaliq Khan while produced by Rafiq Ahmed Choudhary, Fahmeeda Abdul Khaliq, Kamran Siddiqui and Jahanzaib Quadir under the banner of Geo Films. The film's cast included Pakistani television stars Sajal Ali and Feroze Khan in lead roles, in their third project together after the blockbuster drama serials Chup Raho and Gul e Rana. The film was distributed by Geo Films on Eid ul Adha 2016. The film was the remake of the 1979 American film Kramer vs. Kramer.

== Plot ==
Zindagi Kitni Haseen Hy (ZKHH) revolves around the story of a young couple Zain and Mahira who have raised a kid and seem to be struggling with the challenges of life since they married at a very young age. Both of them have their own dreams to follow and appear to be quite passionate about what they wish to achieve in life. Zain, wants to become a filmmaker. However, as their dreams affect their relationship, the two part ways at some point and so goes the story.

Zindagi Kitni Haseen Hay is an emotional roller coaster that tackles the themes of love, life, suffering and passion as the two protagonists try to find a way ahead.

== Cast ==
- Sajal Ali as Mahira Khan
- Feroze Khan as Zain Ahmed
- Nabeel Zuberi as Faraz
- Adil Fayaz as Mangu Seth
- Shafqat Cheema
- Jibraill Ahmed
- Nayyar Ejaz
- Rashid Farooqui
- Alyy Khan

== Production ==
The Film's production is part of a joint venture between an Australian production company RC Films and Rafiq Ahmed Chaudhary's Kingfisher Films. The film's shooting was done in Karachi and Sydney.

== Release ==
The film's teaser was released online on 29 June 2016. Whilst the film's theatrical trailer was released on 5 July 2016. The film was released on 13 September 2016 in Pakistan.

=== Home media ===
The World Television Premiere was held by Geo Entertainment on 27 June 2017, on the occasion of Eid-ul-Fitar.

=== Digital media ===
Zindagi Kitni Haseen Hay is available on Netflix as VOD for streaming.

== Music ==
The film's OST is composed by Soch, Udan Khatola and Sohail Haider.

Track Listing
No.	Title	Singer(s)	Length
1.	"Udasiyan"	Mustafa Zahid	3:57
2.	"Zindagi Kitni Haseen Hai"	Adnan Dhool & Momina Mustehsan	3:57
3.	"Better Half (Chulbul)"	Bilal Saeed & Sana Zulfiqar	3:15
4.	"Kitni Baar"	Sukhwinder Singh	3:55
5.	"Manqabat"	Farhan Shah	3:35
6.	"Tootiya Tara"	Adnan Dhool	3:40
7.	"Udaasiyan" (Slow Version)	Mustafa Zahid	3:00
8.	"Zindagi Kitni Haseen Hay"	Instrumental	4:10
Total length:			29:30

== Box office ==
The film earned Rs. 45 lakh on its opening day in Pakistan. Then on the second and third day, the film grossed more impressively than the first day and collected Rs. 90 lakh on the second day and the same amount on the third day. The weekend gross of the film remained Rs. 1.82 crore. The worldwide lifetime gross of the film is Rs. 3 crore (US$110,000).

== Accolades ==
Ceremony	Won	Nominated
16th Lux Style Awards		Sajal Aly – Best Actress
47th Nigar Awards	The awards were postponed and did not take place	Sajal Aly – Best Debut Female; Feroze Khan - Best Debut Male; Alyy Khan - Best Supporting Actor; SOCH - Tootia Tara - Best Playback Singer Male; Adnan Dhool - Best Lyricist; SOCH - Best Music Director; Abdul Khaliq Khan - Best Story; Abdul Khaliq Khan - Best Screenplay

== See also ==
- List of Pakistani films of 2016
