= Dobara Phir Se =

- Theatrical release poster
- Directed by: Mehreen Jabbar
- Written by: Bilal Sami
- Produced by: Salman Iqbal; Jerjees Seja; Mehreen Jabbar; Ilana Rossein
- Starring: Adeel Hussain; Sanam Saeed; Hareem Farooq; Ali Kazmi; Tooba Siddiqui
- Cinematography: Andreas Burgess
- Edited by: Dipika Kalra
- Music by: Haniya Aslam; Justin Gray
- Production company: ARY Films
- Distributed by: ARY Films
- Release date: 25 November 2016 (Pakistan)
- Country: Pakistan
- Language: Urdu
- Box office: Rs. 10.50 crore (US$380,000)

Dobara Phir Se (Urdu: دوبارہ پھر سے , lit. 'All Over Again') is a 2016 Pakistani romantic drama film directed by Mehreen Jabbar who co-produced it as well, written by Bilal Sami and a production of ARY Films. The film is produced by Salman Iqbal and co-produced by Mohammad Jerjees Seja. The film stars Ali Kazmi, Hareem Farooq, Adeel Hussain, Tooba Siddiqui, Sanam Saeed, Atiqa Odho, Shaz Khan, and child actor, Musa Khan. The film was released on 25 November 2016.

== Plot ==
Film's story revolves around a character of a divorced Pakistani woman based in New York City who meets an ambitious Hammad (Adeel Hussain). The film explores their relationship and eventual challenges as they begin to grow feelings for one another.

== Cast ==
- Hareem Farooq as Zainab Rehman
- Adeel Hussain as Hammad Farooqui
- Sanam Saeed as Samar
- Ali Kazmi as Vassay
- Tooba Siddiqui as Natasha
- Atiqa Odho as Ammi, Zainab step-mother
- Shaz Khan as Asim
- Musa Khan as Zaid
- Adnan Saeed as Jason
- Malika Zafar as Tania
- James Koroni as Choreographer
- Michelle Sohn as Young mother

=== Guest appearances ===
- Shamim Hilaly as Maa Ji, Hammad's mother
- Sonia Rehman as Rabia, Hammad's sister

== Production ==
The director announced film title in July 2015 that she is about to start this project soon. The film is produced by distribution company ARY Films. The director revealed film's cast and crew on 18 August 2015 in her tweet.

=== Filming ===
Film shooting began on 23 August in New York City. On 28 August, a scene was short over Bridge Street Bridge. In the last week of August, scenes were shot at Jennings Beach and Lake Mohegan. First spell of film ended in New York at end of September's first week.

== Release ==
The film was released in Pakistan on 25 November 2016. It was also screened at the first-ever Pakistan Film Festival in New York City, held from December 3–4, 2016, at the Asia Society.

== Reception ==
=== Critical reception ===
The film received mixed to negative reviews from critics, with praise for its performances and technical execution but criticism for its script and pacing. Dawn Images praised the film's "winning attribute" as writer Bilal Sami's "subtle subversion of widely held ideas about love and marriage," noting it "does a great job of showing instead of telling" regarding its divorced protagonist. A separate review for Dawn called it the "first real entrant" in the "NRP (Non-Resident Pakistani) film" genre, praising its "coherent, handsome-looking production" and "refreshingly cliché-free" dialogue. The Express Tribune called it a "must watch" and "a true example of how Pakistani cinema is finally reviving itself," praising the "phenomenal" performances, "beyond comparison" cinematography, and "amazingly written" script. Daily Times described it as a "masterpiece" with "superb" acting, "high quality" sound, and "superb cinematography," though it acknowledged the story "comes across a bit weak."

The Nation was highly critical, calling it "as artificial as it is boring" and "desperate to be an uber cool film." The review criticised the "one-dimensional" characters, "poor screenplay," and "poorer direction," stating the actors' "competent performances are all but wasted." The News International (Instep) gave it 2.5 stars, stating it "doesn't have enough in it to make you watch it phir se." While praising the "good-looking film" and "fine" acting, the review criticised the "self-inflicted" problems of the characters, the dragging plot, and unnecessary product placements, concluding it's "not much more than a minor tele-drama." The Express Tribune's year-end review was scathing, stating the film "failed to make Dobara Phir Se rise to even a respectable level of bad, thanks to a hokey story and poor dialogue," calling it a "long film that subjects its viewers to paralysing boredom."

== Accolades ==
| Ceremony | Category | Recipient | Result | Ref |
|---|---|---|---|---|
| 16th Lux Style Awards | Best Film | Dobara Phir Se | Nominated | |
| 16th Lux Style Awards | Best Film Director | Mehreen Jabbar | Nominated | |
| 16th Lux Style Awards | Best Supporting Actor in a Film | Ali Kazmi | Nominated | |
| 16th Lux Style Awards | Best Supporting Actress in a Film | Sanam Saeed | Won | |
| 16th Lux Style Awards | Best Supporting Actress in a Film | Tooba Siddiqui | Nominated | |
| 16th Lux Style Awards | Best Female Playback in a Film | Haniya Aslam for Dobara Phir Se | Nominated | |

== Soundtrack ==
The Dobara Phir Se soundtrack, composed by Haniya Aslam and released in 2016, is a collection of contemporary Pakistani tracks. Featuring artists like Ali Hamza, Jimmy Khan, and Rekha Bhardwaj.

| No. | Title | Singer(s) | Length |
|---|---|---|---|
| 1. | "Dobara Phir Se" | Haniya Aslam & Ali Hamza | 03:34 |
| 2. | "Lar Gaiyaan" | Zarish Hafeez & Shiraz Uppal | 05:02 |
| 3. | "Rasta Tham Gaya" | Rekha Bhardwaj | 04:16 |
| 4. | "Raske Bhare Tore Nain" | Arooj Aftab | 02:56 |
| 5. | "Khamoshi" | Jimmy Khan | 05:17 |
| 6. | "Wo Kaisi Ho Gee" (Woh Kesi Ho Gee Zindagi) | Jimmy Khan | 04:32 |
| 7. | "Hone Do" (Hone Dou) | Jimmy Khan & Sara Haider | 03:01 |
| Total length: | | | 28:38 |

== See also ==
- List of Pakistani films of 2016
