= Alyy Khan =

British-Pakistani actor (born 1968)

- علی خان
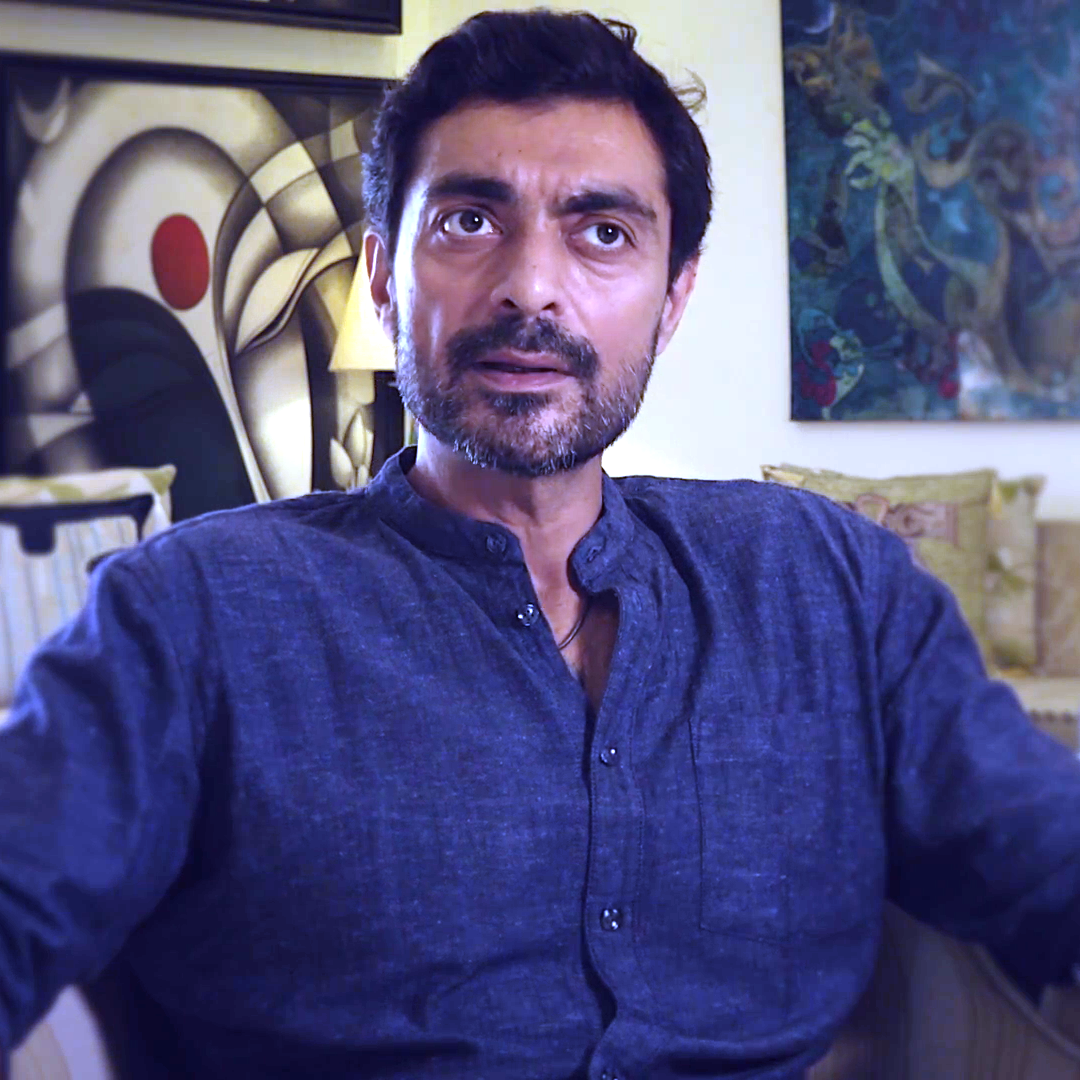
- Khan in 2020
- Born: 6 December 1968 (age 57); Karachi, Sindh, Pakistan
- Education: Pimlico Academy
- Occupation: Actor
- Years active: 1993–present
- Relatives: Junaid Jamshed (cousin)

Alyy Khan is a British-Pakistani actor and host who has worked in Hollywood, Bollywood, and Lollywood films and television series. He is known for his roles in the films A Mighty Heart (2007), Traitor (2008), Don 2 (2011), 3 Bahadur (2015), Actor in Law (2016), and Mogul Mowgli (2020), and also played a parallel lead in the telefilm Anjuman (2013). Khan has also appeared in several television series, including The Bill (2006), Strike Back (2011), Saat Pardon Mein (2012), Indian Summers (2015), Pakeezah (2016), Mere Humsafar (2022) and Mohabbat Satrangi (2024).

In 2012, Khan hosted the television reality show Foodistan for NDTV and Geo TV. His recent work credits include The Serpent (2020) on Netflix, Shantaram (2022) on Paramount/Apple + TV, and The Archies (2023) on Netflix.

== Early life and education ==
Khan was born in Karachi, Pakistan. After his parents divorced, Khan moved with his mother to England and then to his maternal grandmother's home in Mumbai, India when he was about ten years old. He received his education at Bombay Scottish School in Mumbai. He studied drama under the guidance of Hima Devi, who was affiliated with Trinity College London, through the Hima Kala Kendra in Mumbai. Khan also holds a diploma in film and television production from Pimlico Arts and Media College in London.

Singer-turned-Islamic preacher Junaid Jamshed was his cousin.

Fluent in English, Urdu and Hindi, Khan also has a working knowledge of Sanskrit.

== Career ==
=== Actor ===
Khan started his career in the early 1990s in Indian television shows and later theatrical Indian films. He is known for his roles in the films A Mighty Heart (2007), Traitor (2008), Don 2 (2011), 3 Bahadur (2015), Actor in Law (2016), and Mogul Mowgli (2020), and also played a parallel lead in the telefilm Anjuman (2013). Khan has also appeared in several television series, including The Bill (2006), Strike Back (2011), Saat Pardon Mein (2012), Indian Summers (2015), and Pakeezah (2016). Recent acting credits include The Serpent (2020) on Netflix, Shantaram (2022) on Paramount/Apple + TV, and The Archies (2022) on Netflix India.

=== Host ===
From 2012 to 2013, Khan hosted the cooking game show Foodistan, where chefs from both India and Pakistan competed, broadcast simultaneously on NDTV and Geo TV.

=== Theatre director ===
In 2013, Khan directed a play, Aapki Soniya, starring Sajid Hasan and Mehwish Hayat, staged in Karachi's NAPA.

=== Brand ambassador ===
Khan is also engaged in philanthropy and currently serves as the Brand Ambassador of Crossadder Foundation, a 'for youth, by youth' NGO working on awareness, advocacy, and action. Crossadder Foundation is the caretaker of Master Ayub School and facilitates the education of street children.

== Filmography ==
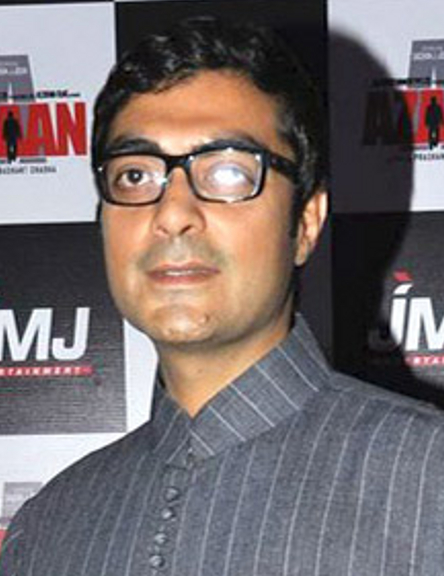
Khan in 2011

=== Films ===
Year	Film	Role	Country	Notes
2001	Deham	Jeetu	India	
2003	Stumped	Major Raghav Seth	India	
2003	Sssshhh...	Akash Rathore	India	
2003	Escape from Taliban		India	
2004	Kiss Kis Ko	BD	India	
2005	Nazar	Dr. Tarun Khanna	India	
2006	Sharpe's Challenge	Mohan Singh	UK	Television film
2007	A Mighty Heart	Sheikh Omar	USA	
2008	Traitor	Fareed	USA	
2009	42 km	Prem	India	Cameo appearance
2009	Luck by Chance	Satish Chaudhary	India	
2009	Do Paise Ki Dhoop, Chaar Aane Ki Baarish	Ali	India	Guest appearance
2010	Dark Relic	Hasan	USA	Television film
2010	Pusher	Scott	USA	
2011	Kingdom of Dust	Dakheel	USA	
2011	Everywhere and Nowhere	Ahmed Khan	UK	
2011	Aazaan	Sam Sharma	India	
2011	Jo Hum Chahein	Vikram Khurana	India	
2011	Don 2	J. K. Diwan	India	
2012	Titlee	Manij	India	Short film
2013	Anjuman	Ahmed	Pakistan	Television film
2013	Oonga	Manoranjan	India	
2014	Blemished Light	Ali	India	
2014	Unfreedom		India	
2015	3 Bahadur	Voice	Pakistan	
2016	Mah e Mir	Nawab Sahab	Pakistan	
2016	Actor in Law	Muddasir Sultan	Pakistan	
2016	Zindagi Kitni Haseen Hay	Zahid	Pakistan	
2016	Team	Zahid Ahmed	Pakistan	
2017	The Valley	Nael Kumar	USA	
2018	Tick Tock	Junaid	Pakistan	Animated movie
2020	Mogul Mowgli	Bashir	UK	
2023	Huey Tum Ajnabi	Colonel Afrasiab	Pakistan	
2023	Iqbal - The Forgotten Story	Zaman Khan	Pakistan	Biographical film on Iqbal Masih
2023	The Archies	Hiram Lodge	India	Netflix India
2024	Taxali Gate	Malik Yaqoob	Pakistan	
2025	Tehran	Neeraj	India	

=== Television ===
Year	Title	Role	Country	Notes
1993	Dekh Bhai Dekh	Vikram	India	
1994	Tanaav		India	
1994	Tehkikaat	Actor Inder Kumar	India	
1994	Banegi Apni Baat	Kabir	India	
1995	Kash-m-kash	Faisal	India	
1997	Bombay Blue	Moeen	India	
1997–1998	Yeh Hai Raaz	Vivek	India	
2001	Dushman	Rohit Raazdan	India	
2001	1st Indian Telly Awards	Host	India	Awards show
2001	Ssshhhh...Koi Hai - Talaash	Rakesh	India	Aired on StarPlus (Episode 46)
2001	Ssshhhh...Koi Hai - Chehre Pe Chehra	Professor Karan & Kapali	India	Aired on Star Plus (Episode 4)
2002	Ssshhhh...Koi Hai - Jinnaat	Ajitabh	India	
2002	Lipstick	Abhay Ahuja	India	Aired on Zee TV
2004	K. Street Pali Hill	Arindum Keshab	Aired on Star Plus (Episode 1–7)	
2006	The Bill	Tariq Mustafa-Ali	UK	"434" (Season 22: Ep57), "435" (Season 22: Ep58)
2008	Yeh Zindagi Hai	Jalaal Ahmed	Pakistan	Aired on Geo TV
2009	Ssshhhh...Phir Koi Hai - Vallabhgarh Ki Rajkumari	Kuwar Ajinkya	India	Part 1 - Part 8
2009	The Philanthropist	Indian Army Commander	USA	Episode: "Kashmir"
2011	Strike Back	Maj. Gen. Kohli	UK/USA	"Strike Back: Project Dawn" (Season 2: Ep01 and Ep02)
2012	Foodistan	Host	India/Pakistan	
2012	Saat Pardon Mein	Badar Suleman	Pakistan	
2013	Zara Aur Mehrunnisa	Hassan	Pakistan	
2013	Kabhi Kabhi	Rehbar	Pakistan	
2014	Do Qadam Door Thay	Salman	Pakistan	
2014	Aap ki Kaneez	Shah Mir Afandi	Pakistan	
2015	Indian Summers	Ramu Sood	UK	
2015	Partners in Crime	Major Khan	UK	
2015	Mohabbat Aag Si	Arshad	Pakistan	
2015	Maryam	Behraam	Pakistan	Aired on Geo TV
2015	Bojh	Ahsan	Pakistan	
2015	Guzaarish	Jaffar	Pakistan	
2016	Pakeeza	Jibran	Pakistan	Aired on Hum TV
2016	Deewana	Agha	Pakistan	
2016	Kitni Girhain Baaki Hain 2	Rashid Ayaz's step-father	Pakistan	Episode "Shatranj"
2016	Asif	Episode "Qubool Hai"	Pakistan	
2016	Shehrnaz	KK	Pakistan	
2017	Kitni Girhain Baaki Hain 2	Parvez	Pakistan	Episode "Jhalli"
2017	Khuda Mera Bhi Hai	Mikael	Pakistan	
2017	Dil-e-Majboor	Azhar	Pakistan	
2017	Woh Aik Pal	Ahsan	Pakistan	
2017	Chanar Ghati	Jalal Rao	Pakistan	
2017-18	Malkin	Yaawar	Pakistan	
2018	Ustani Jee	Noman	Pakistan	Anthology series - Episode 1
2018	Mera Khuda Jane	Shafiq	Pakistan	
2018	Kabhi Band Kabhi Baja	Irfan	Pakistan	Anthology series - Episode 9 & 25
2019	Kam Zarf	Nabeel	Pakistan	
2019	Qadam Qadam Ishq	Aftab	Pakistan	
2019	Aik Aur Sitam Hai	Rashid	Pakistan	
2019	Juda Na Hona	Wasif	Pakistan	
2019	Bewaja	Luqman	Pakistan	
2019	Tu Zindagi Hai	Waseem	Pakistan	
2020	Mera Maan Rakhna	Sajjad	Pakistan	
2021	Mere Humsfar	Nafees Ahmed	Pakistan	
2023	Hadsa	Ghazanfar Malik	Pakistan	Lead role
2024	Mohabbat Satrangi	Shamim	Pakistan	Lead role
2024	BOL Kahani		Pakistan	Anthology series - BOL Network
2024	Sotan	Azaad Hussain	Pakistan	
2025	Meri Zindagi Hai Tu	Irfan	Pakistan	
2026	Sirf Shabana	Tauqeer	Pakistan	
2026	Zabt	Saqib Ahmad	Pakistan	
2026	Laaj	DC Rais Ali	Pakistan	

=== Webseries ===
Year	Title	Role	Country	Notes
2020	The Serpent	Deputy Superintendent Naranda Nath Tuli	UK	Miniseries on Netflix
2021	Dhoop Ki Deewar	Vijay Malhotra	Pakistan	Original series on Zindagi
2022	Shantaram	Qasim Ali	USA/Australia	Miniseries on Apple+
2023	The Trial	Vishal Chaubey	India	JioHotstar series
2025	The Royals	Dhondi Sahab	India	Netflix series

== Awards and nominations ==
Year	Award	Category	Project	Result
2005	Indian Telly Awards	Best Actor in a Negative Role	Guns & Roses	Nominated
2017	Nigar Awards	Best Supporting Actor	Zindagi Kitni Haseen Hay	Nominated
2017	International Filmmaker Festival of World Cinema, Berlin	Best Actor in a Feature Film	The Valley	Nominated
2017	International Filmmaker Festival of World Cinema, Milan	Best Actor	The Valley	Nominated
2017	Northeast Film Festival, US	Best Actor in a Feature Film	The Valley	Nominated
2021	British Independent Film Awards	Best Supporting Actor	Mogul Mowgli	Nominated
