= Asrar =

Persian language daily in Iran

- Type: Daily newspaper
- Founded: 2006
- Political alignment: Reformism (Iranian)
- Language: Persian
- Headquarters: Tehran
- Country: Iran
- Website: Asrar

Asrar (Persian: اسرار, lit. 'The Mysteries') is a Persian-language reformist daily newspaper published in Tehran, Iran.

== Profile ==
Asrar has a reformist political leaning. Following the presidential elections held in June 2009 the paper was banned temporarily along with other reformist publications. In December 2009, the ministry of culture warned the paper for publishing "divisive" material. On 30 May 2010, Jalil Khaskhashi Moghadam, the managing editor of Asrar, was found guilty by the press jury for publishing incorrect news. In June 2016 he was acquitted by the court on the charges of seizing and encouraging individuals and groups to commit acts against the security, dignity and interests of the Islamic Republic of Iran.
