= Janaan =

2016 Pakistani film by Azfar Jafri

- Theatrical release poster
- جاناں
- Directed by: Azfar Jafri
- Written by: Osman Khalid Butt
- Produced by: Reham Khan; Munir Hussain; Imran Raza Kazmi
- Starring: Armeena Khan; Bilal Ashraf; Ali Rehman Khan; Hania Aamir
- Cinematography: Haider A. Rizvi
- Edited by: Mitesh Soni
- Music by: Taha Malik; Ahmed Ali; Armaan Malik; Salim–Sulaiman
- Production company: IRK Films
- Distributed by: ARY Films; B4U Films
- Release date: 12 September 2016
- Running time: 133 minutes
- Countries: France; Pakistan
- Languages: French; Urdu; Pashto

Janaan (Urdu/Pashto: جانان; transl. Beloved) is a 2016 Pakistani romantic comedy film directed by Azfar Jafri, written by Osman Khalid Butt and co-produced by Hareem Farooq, Munir Hussain, Imran Raza Kazmi and Reham Khan, under production banners of IRK Films and Munir Hussain Films – UK. The film stars Armeena Khan, Bilal Ashraf and Ali Rehman Khan in lead roles.

The film was released in Pakistan by ARY Films on 12 September 2016 (Eid al-Adha). B4U Films distributed the film internationally.

== Plot ==
Meena, a Pashtun student living in Vancouver, Canada, travels to Swat, Pakistan for her cousin Palwasha's wedding. Her Canadian friends are worried that she may be married, too. She is met at the airport by the bride's adopted brother, Asafandyar, and taken back to the house, where festivities are taking a swing.

Upon arrival, Palwasha explains to Meena about her meeting and subsequent engagement with her fiancé Samir, a Punjabi. Daniyal, Palwasha's cousin, attempts to impress Meena with some ill-advised stunts (including swallowing a lit cigarette), to Meena's disapproval and derision. The groom's family also arrive for the wedding. Meena breaks a tooth and while having the tooth fixed becomes intoxicated by the painkillers from the dentist- this leads to a chain of events which leads to Samir becoming uncomfortable, mistakenly thinking that Daniyal is attracted to him. Meanwhile, Meena develops a feeling for Asfandyar after seeing his kind nature, at the school where he works, a school funded by wealthy beneficiary Ikramullah.

On the night of Palwasha's mehndi ceremony, Chotu (the driver) reveals to Asfandyar that he was abused by Ikramullah in his childhood and that Ikramullah is a child predator who has been abusing vulnerable children at the school. Upon Ikramullah's arrival at the ceremony, Asfandyar approaches him in anger and punches and slaps him, much to his family's chagrin. This leads to Daniyal's mother denouncing Asfandyar, claiming that his temperament is solely due to his being adopted.

Asfandyar is greatly upset by this but is consoled by Daniyal, who tells him he thinks of him as his real older brother. Before learning about Ikramullah's true nature, Meena slaps Asfandyar out of anger and afterwards regrets this action.

Due to his family's disapproval of his earlier actions, Asfandyar refrains from telling the family of Ikramullah's child abuse and remains detached at the Nikkah ceremony. His father learns of what happened to Chotu and the younger students and decides to pursue a court case against Ikramullah with the help of the students' parents. Ikramullah threatens violence against the family if the charges are not dropped.

Meanwhile, Samir and Asfandyar help Daniyal plan a proposal for Meena, a proposal that she rejects. Later that evening, the car that Palwasha and Meena are driving is stopped by Ikramullah's men. Asfandyar and Daniyal are also driving along this road and are injured in a struggle with Ikramullah's men.

On the day of the wedding, Meena receives a full-time job offer from a Canadian middle school, starting a month after the wedding. After a talk with Daniyal, Asfandyar realizes his feelings for Meena and goes to her room to talk to her where he finds the job offer and leaves, assuming she will leave after accepting the offer.

After the wedding, Ikramullah's men arrive and shoot Chotu, killing him. Asfandyar follows them and finds that they have set the school on fire, in retaliation for Ikramullah's arrest earlier that night. Daniyal and Meena arrive as Asfandyar runs into the flames.

A month later, Meena is seen teaching the children from the burnt school, which is seen being reconstructed. She and Daniyal then travel to a graveyard, where Asfandyar is visiting Chotu's grave, still blaming himself for his death. Asfandyar assumes Meena is planning to return to Canada, having accepted the job offer, but she tells him she wants to stay and help rebuild the school. She then proceeds to propose to Asfandyar. The three then begin to head home.

== Cast ==
- Armeena Khan as Meena Khan
- Bilal Ashraf as Asfandyar Asad Khan
- Ali Rehman Khan as Daniyal Khan
- Hania Aamir as Palwasha Asad Khan/ Palwasha Samir
- Usman Mukhtar as Samir
- Ajab Gul as Asad Khan
- Mishi Khan as Shireen Gul
- Nayyar Ejaz as Ikramullah
- Shafqat Khan as Khan Zaada
- Saad Zia Abbasi as Chotu
- Sabeena Farooq as Imaan, Samir's sister
- Fahad Ali Panni
- Jalal Khan
- Ahsan Farooq
- Hareem Farooq (guest appearance)
- Osman Khalid Butt (guest appearance)

== Music ==
Janaan

Soundtrack album by Salim–Sulaiman, Ahmed Ali & Taha Malik
- Released: 2016
- Recorded: 2016
- Genre: Feature film soundtrack
- Languages: Urdu, Pashto

Track listing
No.	Title	Singer(s) and Composer/Producers	Length
1.	"Janaan"	Armaan Malik
2.	"Jaanan Reprise"	Shreya Ghoshal
3.	"Shor Sharaba"	Shadab Fridi, Bhoomi Trivedi
4.	"Reid-i-Gul"	Yusra Iqbal, Awais Niazi
5.	"Jhoom Le"	Taha Malik featuring Natasha Baig

== Production ==
=== Filming and casting ===
In May 2015, it was announced that a film named Janaan is in pre-production phase. In August, the cast and crew was revealed on Twitter by the producer. Siyaah's team reunited in this film, with Imran Raza Kazmi returning as producer, Azfar Jafri as director, and Osman Khalid Butt as writer. An agreement was signed between the production team and ARY Films to distribute Janaan. The first spell of shooting began on 21 August in Islamabad and lasted till 5 September.

The second spell started in Swat valley. The same month Usman Mukhtar and Hania Amir were cast. Janaan entered the final phase of its production in mid-October after shooting in Islamabad and Swat. Reham Khan's departure from Pakistan after her divorce with Imran Khan questioned the production status of the film but her co-producer Imran Raza Kazmi stated "As the popular phrase goes: 'the show must go on' and putting all and any speculation to rest, I would like to say that this news will not affect the film in any manner whatsoever."

Ajab Gul, Jalal Khan and Mishi Khan were revealed as cast with their character names on 7 November. Three new artists appeared in Janaan for the first time: Hania Aamir, Usman Mukhtar and Saad Zia Abbasi.

=== Marketing ===
Film's first look poster featuring Armeena Khan, Bilal Ashraf and Ali Rehman Khan was revealed online while Teaser Trailer on 18 March 2016.

Janaan is the first Pakistani film whose teaser was shown on UK TV channel Sky Sports 2 during the World T20 Cup match between India and Pakistan on 19 March 2016.

Further the teaser was played on Shreya Ghoshal Concerts in UK.

The film's theatrical trailer was released on 1 July 2016 on Fahad Mustafa's Jeeto Pakistan show. The trailer was appreciated by critics and film is expected to be a successful endeavor to promote Pashtun culture. The trailer was expected to be played on all Arijit Singh's concerts in UK after its release.

== Release ==
The film was distributed by B4U Films in 17 countries. ARY Films distributed it in Pakistan.

The film was released in the United Arab Emirates on 8 September 2016, and was shown on limited screens the next day in the United Kingdom, United States, Canada, Australia, Malaysia, Fiji, Mauritius, New Zealand, South Africa, East Africa, and Singapore. The film was released in Pakistan on 12 September (Eid al-Adha), and in India on 16 September.

=== Box office ===
The film grossed Rs 300 million ($3 million) worldwide, making it the highest-grossing Pakistani film of 2016. It grossed at least Rs 175 million ($1.68 million) in Pakistan and Rs 110 million ($1.05 million) overseas.

In the United Kingdom, the film grossed £400,000 ($540,000) in 2016, making it the year's seventh highest-grossing non-English and non-Hindi film in the UK. The UK accounted for about half of the film's overseas gross.

== Awards and nominations ==
Date of ceremony	Award	Category	Recipient(s) and nominee(s)	Result	Ref.
19 April 2017	16th Lux Style Awards	Best Film	Janaan	Nominated	
19 April 2017	16th Lux Style Awards	Best Director	Azfar Jafri	Nominated	
19 April 2017	16th Lux Style Awards	Best Supporting Actor	Ali Rehman Khan	Nominated	
19 April 2017	16th Lux Style Awards	Best Supporting Actress	Hania Amir	Nominated	
19 April 2017	16th Lux Style Awards	Best Playback Singer – male	Armaan (for the song "Janaan")	Nominated	
19 April 2017	16th Lux Style Awards	Best Playback Singer – Female	Shreya Ghoshal (for the song "Janaan")	Nominated	
2017	5th Hum Awards	Recognition Award – Films	Janaan	Won	
9 September 2017	1st International Pakistan Prestige Awards	Best Film	Janaan	Nominated	
9 September 2017	1st International Pakistan Prestige Awards	Best Director	Azfar Jafri	Nominated	
9 September 2017	1st International Pakistan Prestige Awards	Best Actor	Bilal Ashraf	Nominated	
9 September 2017	1st International Pakistan Prestige Awards	Best Actress	Armeena Rana Khan	Nominated	
9 September 2017	1st International Pakistan Prestige Awards	Best Supporting Actor	Ali Rehman Khan	Nominated	
2018	Pakistan International Film Festival	Best Film	Janaan	Nominated	
2018	Pakistan International Film Festival	Best Director	Azfar Jafri	Nominated	
2018	Pakistan International Film Festival	Best Male Debut	Bilal Ashraf	Nominated	
2018	Pakistan International Film Festival	Best Male Debut	Ali Rehman Khan	Won	
2018	Pakistan International Film Festival	Best Female Debut	Hania Amir	Won	
2018	Pakistan International Film Festival	Best Editor	Mitesh Soni	Won	

== See also ==
- List of Pakistani films of 2016
