= Madhumita Mohanta =

Indian chef

Madhumita Mohanta is an Indian chef. Mohanta is the executive chef at Great Eastern Hotel in Kolkata. She worked and lived abroad for over a decade and has cooked for distinguished personalities from sportspersons such as racing car driver Michael Schumacher to royalty. Mohanta is one of the top women chefs in India today. She is the only female executive chef in a star hotel in Kolkata.

In 2010, she was executive sous-chef at Claridges, Surajkund in Haryana.
