= Rahm (film) =

- Directed by: Ahmed Jamal
- Written by: Mahmood Jamal
- Produced by: Mahmood Jamal
- Starring: Sanam Saeed; Sunil Shanker; Sajid Hasan; Nayyar Ejaz; Khalid Butt; Seerat Jaffri
- Cinematography: Jono Smith
- Edited by: Kant Pan
- Production company: Rahm Films Limited
- Distributed by: HKC Entertainment
- Release date: 18 November 2016
- Running time: 103 minutes
- Country: Pakistan
- Language: Urdu

Rahm (also spelled 'Rehm') is a 2016 Pakistani drama-thriller Film, based on William Shakespeare's play Measure for Measure. It is written and produced by Mahmood Jamal and directed by Ahmed Jamal. Sanam Saeed, Sonil Shanker, Sajid Hasan and Nayyar Ejaz play lead roles in the film. The film's plot is based on honesty, justice, love and unity.

== Synopsis ==
The film's plot resolves around governor (Sajid Hasan) who retires from his post after a heart attack. He is replaced by Qazi Ahad (Sonil Shanker) who rules corruptly, whilst believing that the former governor away. He punishes married couple for fornication after they lose their nikah papers but unknown to him the former governor is watching everything whilst disguised as a Peer.

== Cast ==
- Sanam Saeed as Samina
- Rohail Pirzada
- Sonil Shankar
- Sajid Hasan
- Nayyar Ejaz
- Seerat Jafri
- Khalid Butt

== Production ==
=== Casting ===
Sanam Saeed and Sajid Hassan were cast in the film by the Director Ahmed Jamal, who is a close friend of Sanam's Parents. Whilst Sajid Hassan who was shown the script fell in love with the script and later agreed to be part of the film. Famous Shakespearean UK actress Claire Bloom was of high praise when she saw Sajid in his role, and praised him as a major talent.

=== Filming ===
The Film's entire shooting was done in Studios which are located in Lahore. The film crew used Arri Alexa and Cooke movie camera lenses, in order to capture the amazing atmosphere of the old narrow streets of Lahore and the architecture of Walled City of Lahore. The film's photography direction was done by Jono Smith whilst the editing was done by Kant Pan.

== Reception ==
Rahm released on 18 November 2016. The film did not do well commercially. However, it was highly praised by Pakistani film journalist Adnan Murad. He wrote: "Director Ahmed Jamal keeps the spirit of Measure for Measure alive throughout this feature, trusting his audience to accept the complexities of the tale." Murad also praised the depiction of Lahore in this film. He wrote: "The writer-director duo is unabashedly smitten by the backdrop. They hold your finger and take you through the local neighbourhoods, sites and streets familiar to the people of Lahore, to let the city cast its spell."

== Release ==
The trailer for the film was released in August 2016. The film was released in Pakistan nationwide on 18 November 2016.
