= Anjum Shahzad =

Pakistani director

- Born: Anjum Shahzad; 11 October 1974 (age 52); Islamabad
- Occupations: TV & Film director, producer, writer and actor
- Years active: 1997-present

Anjum Shahzad (Urdu: انجم شہزاد) is a Pakistani TV and film director, producer, writer, actor and philanthropist. Shahzad is best known for his role as Bobby in the critically acclaimed and madly-followed comedy series Family Front in 1997. The situational comedy earned him PTV Award for Best Debut Actor.

== Early life and education ==
Anjum Shahzad was born and raised in Islamabad, where he spent his childhood engaged in outdoor activities such as climbing trees, playing badminton and football, and organizing informal performances with friends during school breaks.

He initially intended to pursue a military career and applied twice to join the Pakistan Army, but was not recommended. He then considered preparing for the civil service examination (CSS) before ultimately deciding against pursuing a traditional career path. He later earned a master's degree in Economics from the University of the Punjab in Lahore.

While studying in Lahore, Shahzad developed an interest in the performing arts. He enrolled in a one-year acting course and participated in several workshops covering theatre acting, theatre direction, television direction, and screenplay writing. In 1996, he joined the Lahore Drama School, where he completed an eight-month theatre program led by prominent figures such as Shoaib Hashmi, Samina Ahmed, Salman Shahid, and Ustad Paras. During this time, he co-founded the theatre group Daastan with fellow student Zain Ahmed, the son of Samina Ahmed.

== Career ==
=== Television ===
Shahzad began his career with the role of Bobby in the 1997 sitcom Family Front. Soon after the success of his character he stopped seeking roles for acting on screen, to pursue a successful career in direction. Shahzad received accoldates for his directoral work, including his 3rd Best TV Director award at 15th Lux Style Awards for Rang Laaga (2015).

=== Cinema ===
He debuted as film director in 2016 with a biopic Mah-e-Mir inspired by the life of a genius Urdu poet of 18th century, Mir Taqi Mir, with semi-fictional elements. The movie was screened as part of the official selection of the Guam International Film Festival, which included around 60 films, according to its website. The film picked up the Best Narrative Film award at the festival. Later that year, it won Best Film and Best Music awards at India's most prestigious awards at the Dada Saheb Film Festival, held in Delhi. Mah e Mir was selected by the Pakistani Academy Selection Committee as the Pakistan's Official entry for the Best Foreign Language Film at the 89th Academy Awards.

Anjum Shahzad's second film Zindagi Kitni Haseen Hai was released in 2016.

== Filmography ==
=== Films ===
| Year | Title | Director | Writer |
|---|---|---|---|
| 2013 | Armaan | Yes | Yes |
| 2016 | Mah-e-Mir | Yes | |
| 2016 | Zindagi Kitni Haseen Hay | Yes | |

=== Television series ===
| Year | Title | Actor | Director | Writer | Producer | Network |
|---|---|---|---|---|---|---|
| 1997 | Family Front | Yes | | | | PTV |
| 1998 | Kyun? | Yes | | | | PTV |
| 2000 | College Jeans | Yes | | | | PTV |
| 2008 | Pehla Chand | | Yes | | | Geo Entertainment |
| 2008 | Satrangi | | | | Yes | Geo Entertainment |
| 2013 | Kabhi Kabhi | | Yes | | | ARY Digital |
| 2014 | Dusri Biwi | | Yes | | | ARY Digital |
| 2015 | Rang Laaga | | Yes | | | ARY Digital |
| 2016 | Mera Yaar Miladay | | Yes | Yes | | ARY Digital |
| 2017 | Dil‑e‑Nadaan | | Yes | | Yes | Express Entertainment |
| 2017 | Khaani | | Yes | | | Geo Entertainment |
| 2018 | Romeo Weds Heer | | Yes | | | Geo Entertainment |
| 2019 | Darr Khuda Say | | Yes | | | Geo Entertainment |
| 2021 | Pehli Si Muhabbat | | Yes | | | ARY Digital |
| 2023 | Jindo | | Yes | | | Green Entertainment |
| 2023 | Idiot | | Yes | | | Green Entertainment |
| 2023 | 22 Qadam | | Yes | | | Green Entertainment |
| 2024 | Akhara | | Yes | | | Green Entertainment |
| 2024 | Abdullahpur Ka Devdas | | Yes | | Yes | Zee Zindagi |
| 2025 | Neeli Kothi | | Yes | | | Hum TV |

== Awards and nominations ==
| Year | Nominated For | Event | Category | Results |
|---|---|---|---|---|
| 1998 | Family Front | PTV Award | Best Debut Actor | Won |
| 2005 | Woh Tees Din | Lux Style Award | Best TV Director - Satellite | Won |
| 2008 | Pehla Chand | 7th Lux Style Awards | Best TV Director - Satellite | Won |
| 2016 | Rang Laaga | 15th Lux Style Awards | Best TV Director | Won |
| 2016 | Mah e Mir | Dada Saheb Film Festival | Best Film Award | Won |
| 2016 | Mah e Mir | Dada Saheb Film Festival | Best Music Award | Won |
| 2016 | Mah e Mir | Guam International Film Festival | Best Narrative Film | Won |
| 2017 | Mah e Mir | Prague Independent Film Festival | Best Director | Nominated |
| 2017 | Mah e Mir | Prague Independent Film Festival | Best Cinematography | Won |
| 2017 | Mah e Mir | 16th Lux Style Awards | Best Film Director | Nominated |
| 2018 | Khaani | 17th Lux Style Awards | Best TV Director | Nominated |
