= Asim Raza =

Pakistani filmmaker

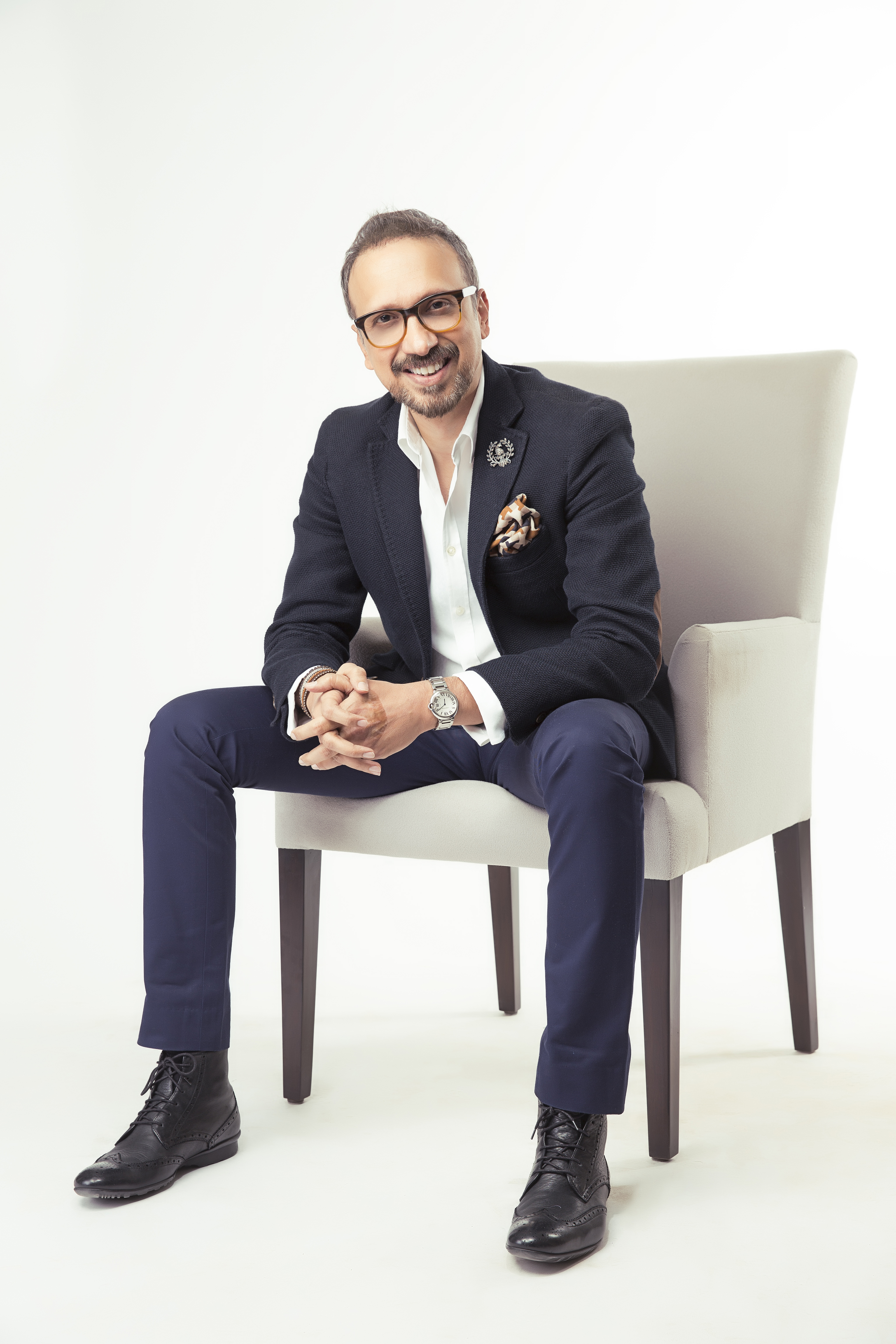
- Raza in 2015
- Born: Asim Raza; Karachi
- Occupations: Director; producer; entrepreneur
- Years active: 1993–present
- Organization: The Vision Factory
- Spouse: Ayla Raza
- Children: Zainab Raza, Maryam Raza
- Relatives: Pervez Musharraf (father in law)

Asim Raza (/rɑːzɑː/; Urdu: عاصم رضا) is a Pakistani film and television commercial director and producer. In 2004, Raza won the Lux Style Award for Best Music Video Director for "Mahi Ve". In 2013, Raza directed a television film, Behadd which won the Hum Award for Best Television Film. Raza marked his feature film debut with a coming-of-age drama Ho Mann Jahaan, Raza owns a production company called The Vision Factory.

== Career ==
=== 1994–1996: TVCs and music videos ===
From 1994 onwards, Raza worked on commercials and videos as a producer/director. He directed a magazine show for television based on advertising and marketing called The Big Idea. Between 1994 -1996 Raza continued making commercials for brands like Coca-Cola, Sprite, Lux, Olay, Cadbury, Mobilink, Sunsilk, Pantene, Head and Shoulders, Garnier and others. He has also worked with musicians from Pakistan such as Junoon, Junaid Jamshed, Najam Sheraz, Abrar-ul-Haq and Hadiqa Kiani.

=== 1997–2012: The Vision Factory and music concerts ===
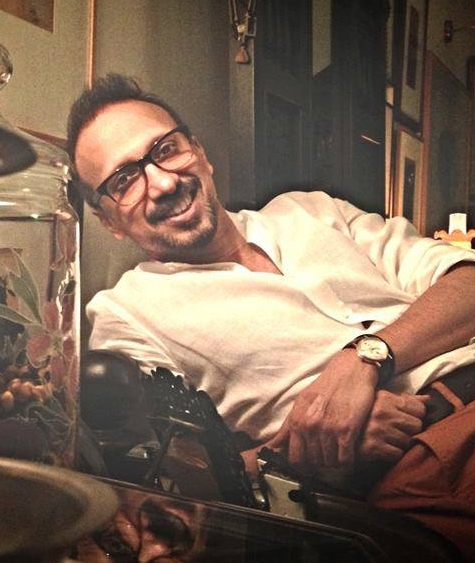
Asim at his studio, The Vision Factory.

In 1997, Raza started his production company, The Vision Factory. Under this banner, he made the music video for the single "Sayonee" for the band Junoon. It stayed at no. 1 on both Channel V and MTV Asia for over eight weeks. Raza then attended various short courses, workshops, and seminars including one at the New York Film Academy. On 4 May 1997, Asim Raza filmed and directed the last concert of Nusrat Fateh Ali Khan, before his death on 17 August 1997, known as "The Pakistan 4 U Concert" aired on Channel V at Karachi Gymkhana. The concert was televised internationally, marking the first ever Pakistani music production which was broadcast beyond South Asia. The concert was made into live album named, "Swan Song-His Final Performance". Following that, Raza filmed the concert performed by Junoon at Central Park, known as "A Tribute to Nusrat Fateh Ali Khan – Junoon Live at Central Park". Raza also directed the 2nd Lux Style Awards ceremony in 2003 and short documentary about Kathak dance called Raqsan showcasing the talent of Pakistani classical dancer Fasih Ur Rehman. In 2008, he became an external board member on the board of studies for the communication design department at the Indus Valley School of Art and Architecture.

=== 2013–present: Behadd and Ho Mann Jahaan ===
In 2013, Raza directed a telefilm Behadd, written by Umera Ahmed under MD Productions for Hum TV. Starring Fawad Khan, Nadia Jamil and Sajjal Ali, Behadd premiered 23 February 2013 on Hum TV. The telefilm went on to win Best Television Film award at second Hum Awards ceremony.

Raza marked his directional debut in the film industry with Ho Mann Jahaan, which Sheheryar Munawar Siddiqui co-produced with him. Ho Mann Jahaan is a coming-of-age drama film, starring Mahira Khan, Sheheryar Munawar Siddiqui, Adeel Hussain and Sonya Jehan The film was released on 1 January 2016. The film opened to great critical reviews and proved to be a huge commercial success at the box office. Ho Mann Jahaan was distributed by ARY Films. Raza also wrote three songs for the Film that were heavily praised by critics. In an interview with The Express Tribune Raza Said, "One should tell a story which is real, relatable and true to life, which is why I opted for a more content-driven film which would touch hearts."

== Personal life ==
Raza is married to Ayla Raza, daughter of former army chief and president of Pakistan Pervez Musharraf. Also an architect by education, Ayla Raza is working for the promotion of traditional performing arts as a director at a not for profit organization, All Pakistan Music Conference (APMC), Karachi. Together they have two daughters, Maryam Raza and Zainab Raza.

== Filmography ==
=== Films ===
Year	Title	Language	Notes
2016	Ho Mann Jahaan	Urdu	Released – 1 January 2016
2019	Parey Hut Love	Urdu	Released – 9 August 2019

=== Television ===
Year	TV
2013	Behadd

== Awards ==
Year	Film	Awards
2013	Behadd	Best Telefilm Director

=== Lux Style Awards ===
Ceremony	Category	Project	Result
1st Lux Style Awards	Best Video Director	N/A	Nominated
4th Lux Style Awards	Best Video Director	Mahi Vay	Won
16th Lux Style Awards	Best Film	Ho Mann Jahaan	Nominated
16th Lux Style Awards	Best Film Director	Ho Mann Jahaan	Nominated
18th Lux Style Awards	Best Film Director	Parey Hut Love	Nominated

== See also ==
- Khalil-ur-Rehman Qamar
