= Thori Khushi Thora Ghum =

- Written by: Abdul Qadir Junejo
- Screenplay by: Zulfikar Sheikh
- Directed by: Zulfikar Sheikh
- Starring: Talat Hussain; Humayun Saeed; Aijaz Aslam; Asad; Nabeel; Arjumand Rahim; Javeria Jalil; Nighat Chaudhry
- Theme music composer: Waqar Ali
- Country of origin: Pakistan
- Original language: Urdu
- No. of episodes: 17

Production
- Producer: Tasmina Sheikh
- Production company: Elysée Productions

Original release
- Network: PTV Home
- Release: April 2002 – 2002

Thori Khushi Thora Ghum is a Pakistani television serial written by Abdul Qadir Junejo, based on a story and screenplay by Zulfikar Sheikh who also directed it. It was produced by Tasmina Sheikh under banner Elysée Productions. The ensemble cast of the serial includes Talat Hussain, Humayun Saeed, Aijaz Aslam, Nabeel, Asad, Arjumand Rahim and Nighat Chaudhry. It aired in 2002 on PTV Home.

== Plot ==
Rana Shamsheer, a mafia don from the UK, uses Dilawar as his right-hand man for his criminal activities. His only daughter and weakness, Malaika, loves Dilawar and wants to marry him. However, Dilawar seems disinterested. After finishing Shamsheer's work, he spends time with a young child, Zain, whose father was murdered by Dilawar in front of him. Since then, Dilawar has adopted him and brought him up.

Jamal, a Multan-based passionate painter, moves to the UK after selling his grandfather's agricultural land. However, in the UK, he experiences a creative block due to a lack of inspiration. His landlady, Marium, initially tries to help him but later asks him to leave her house after becoming afraid of his mental condition. He meets Malaika through Marium's daughter, Alisha, and experiences déjà vu.

Amir, the sole breadwinner of his family belonging to an underprivileged locality of Karachi, moves to the UK to save his life from the criminal mafia he had previously worked for. He informs his family about his move through a letter and finds accommodation in Marium's house. There, he befriends Alisha.

Ather and Rubina, a working-class couple from Lahore, struggle with their daughter's Leukemia. To earn more money for her treatment, Ather moves to the UK. There, he faces legal problems and has no choice but to marry a UK citizen. For his convenience, Seema, a social worker and lawyer who had helped him before, enters into a paper marriage with him to help him. However, back home, his daughter dies before he can send the money for her treatment, and Rubina has no choice but to come to Ather when she fails to contact him despite repeated attempts.

Malaika arranges her engagement to Dilawar, but he still shows no interest. During the ceremony, Shamsheer tries to kill Dilawar, but Amir and Jimmy, one of Shamsheer's workers, save him. Dilawar then ends his relationship with Malaika, telling her that he was never in love with her. Inspired by Malaika, Jamal asks her to sit for a portrait. She agrees, and they begin to grow closer. Shamsheer learns about their closeness and tries to create distance between Malaika and Dilawar by telling her about Dilawar's criminal activities. He also makes Jamal an affluent artist by arranging a fake exhibition of his work and then buying the paintings himself.

Jamal and Malaika eventually marry, and Jamal feels ashamed of his passion when Shamsheer's exhibition scheme is exposed. Dilawar also reveals Shamsheer's true profession to Malaika. Jamal becomes suspicious of Malaika when he finds her with Dilawar, but Dilawar clears the air by telling him that she is a good woman. Shamsheer eventually decides to kill Dilawar and sends Jimmy to do the job. However, Dilawar survives getting a bullet on his arm and is taken to the hospital by Natasha, an officer of the Crime Investigation Department who has been following him for a long time because she wants him to turn state's evidence.

Alisha and Amir fall in love with each other, but are caught in a love triangle when Marium expresses her feelings for Amir. The relationship of both the mother and daughter strains with Amir but they reconcile at the hospital, where Alisha is taken after being involved in an accident. In the hospital, Marium learns that she is suffering from a terminal condition. Her condition deteriorates, and Alisha and Amir learn that she has only a few days to live. Eventually, Alisha and Amir get married after her death.

When Malaika questions Shamsheer, he confesses to his crimes. She also confronts his about marrying her off to a man who does not love her. Jamal, who already feels betrayed by Shamsheer, approaches him and announces that he is leaving behind Shamsheer's privileged lifestyle and his daughter. Shamsheer, however, tries to persuade him to resolve his problems with Malaika. Malaika, who also does not want to live with someone who no longer loves her, plans with Jamal to tell her father that they have merely had some misunderstandings and need time to resolve them. Jamal then returns to Pakistan. In his absence, Malaika eventually realises that he simply wants to escape Shamsheer's wealth because of his self-respect. After some days, Malaika receives Jamal's letter where he reveals that after returning to Multan he has bought back his land to build a studio and a house for her. Shamsheer urges her to go to him.

Meanwhile, Rubina learns about Seema, Ather's second wife. Over time, Seema also falls in love with Ather and wants to continue their relationship. She even converts to Islam for him. Ather faces constant conflicts between his two wives. However, Seema becomes increasingly unhappy when Rubina gives birth to a daughter. Eventually, Seema enters a rehabilitation centre after becoming mentally unstable. Ather does his best to help her recover, but he is advised by the doctor to avoid any contact with her because it worsens her condition. He agrees and distances himself from her for her well-being.

Natasha gathers evidence against Shamsheer after raiding his workplaces. She warns him that she also has Dilawar as a witness against him. Dilawar then kills Shamsheer because Shamsheer had shot Zain, and he surrenders himself at the police station. Natasha arrives there informing him that Zain is alive. Dilawar requests her to take care of him. Amir visits Dilawar in prison, where Dilawar advises him to return to Pakistan. Amir does so, leaving Alisha behind, as she refuses to go with him. At the end, Shamsheer is seen sitting on a roadside bench, reading a newspaper.

== Cast ==
- Talat Hussain as Rana Shamsheer
- Humayun Saeed as Jamal
- Nabeel as Dilawar
- Asad as Ather
- Aijaz Aslam as Amir
- Ayesha Sana as Seema
- Javeria Jalil as Rubina
- Arjumand Rahim as Malaika
- Nighat Chaudhry as Mairum
- Asma Anwar as Alisha
- Humayun Gul as Shafiq
- Kulsoom Sultan as Saleha
- Aurangzeb Leghari as Allah Wasaya
- Ashraf Khan as Jimmy
- Tasmina Sheikh as Natasha

== Production ==
Thori Khushi Thora Ghum was directed by Zulfikar Sheikh as his directorial debut, and was produced by his wife Tasmina Sheikh whose production house has previously produced the serials like Des Pardes and Aansoo.

== Soundtrack ==
The original soundtrack of the serial "Teri Taad" was performed by Sajjad Ali, the music of which was composed by his brother Waqar Ali.

== Reception ==
In a negative review of the serial published in the DAWN Images, the reviewer Shazman Shariff panned it for the highly rushed and formulaic last episode, and found Talat Hussain's portrayal resembling with his previous work overall hailing the serial as "a damp squib".

=== Awards and nominations ===
Year	Awards	Category	Recipient/Nominee	Result	Ref.
2003	Lux Style Awards	Best Television Play	Elysée Productions	Nominated	
