= Meharun Nisa =

- Official poster
- Directed by: Kamran Qureshi
- Written by: Zafar Mairaj
- Produced by: Iram Qureshi
- Starring: Sara Loren; Bushra Ansari; Talat Hussain; Humayun Bin Rather; Uzma Akhter Khanji; Akbar Subhani; Samina Kamal; Taj Niazi and Hareem Qureshi.
- Cinematography: Naeem Ahmad
- Edited by: Adnan Wai Qureshi
- Music by: Mohsin Allah Ditta
- Production company: Evergreen Media Europe
- Distributed by: Indus TV Network
- Release date: 8 February 2004 (Karachi)
- Running time: 46 minutes
- Country: United Kingdom
- Language: Urdu with English subtitles

Meharun Nisa, also known as Born Forbidden, is an Urdu language television drama film. It was written by Zafar Mairaj, directed by Kamran Qureshi and produced by Iram Qureshi.

Meharun Nisa is said to be based on a true story. The main character in the story is Meharun, who was abandoned as a baby. Born to a prostitute, she struggles to shake the stigma associated with the circumstances of her birth.

The film was broadcast in 2004 on Indus TV Network in Pakistan & UAE and in 2005 on Zee TV UK & United States as part of film series 'Maa Aur Mamta', which consisted of 13 films including Meharun Nisa.

External videos
- The trailer of Meharun Nisa

== Plot ==
While purchasing groceries in the market Yousuf's servant, Qadir (Akbar Subhani), overhears that a newborn baby (Hareem Qureshi) has been abandoned in the midst of piles of rubbish in the market. He hears that the baby has been left there as it is the child of a prostitute, and that such a child is left there every one or two months. He is told that it would have been better to have buried the baby, instead of leaving it for the animals.

Qadir takes the baby to the home of a rich man, Yousuf, (Talat Hussain). Yousuf's maid, Zainab (Bushra Ansari), asks Qadir why he brought an 'illegal' baby to Yousuf's home. Qadir reminds Zainab about what Yousuf said when they found a dead baby in the drain. Yousuf had said that no baby is illegal and that only the actions of prostitutes who threw babies away should be seen as illegal.

Zainab decides to bring the baby home and name her Meharun Nisa. Her husband Rajab Ali (Taj Niazi), a nasty, idle drunkard, questions Zainab about why she brought the baby to his home when they already had two children, Vikky (Humayun Bin Rather) and Rabia (Uzma Akhter Khanji). Zainab tries to appease him by telling him that Yousuf will bear the baby's expenses and that he does not have to worry about having less money to buy alcohol.

English documentary filmmakers hear of Meharun's story and a documentary about her is made and aired on BBC. On watching that documentary, Alina (Samina Kamal), who lives in England, decides to visit Pakistan and ask Zainab if she and her husband can adopt the baby. Zainab was attached to Meharun, but she agrees in order to give Meharun a better future. Alina and her husband then bring the baby to England.

Seventeen years later, Meharun Nisa (Sara Loren) grows up and comes across the documentary. For the first time, she understands what happened in her past. She goes to Pakistan to meet Zainab, the lady who cared for her.

== Cast ==
=== Principal cast ===
- Sara Loren as Meharun Nisa (Adult)
- Bushra Ansari as Zainab
- Talat Hussain as Yousuf
- Humayun Bin Rather as Vikky (Adult)
- Uzma Akhter Khanji as Rabia (Adult)
- Akbar Subhani as Qadir (Yousuf's Servant)
- Taj Niazi as Rajab Ali

=== Supporting ===
- Samina Kamal as Alina
- Nabeela as English TV Reporter
- Agha Sohail as English Translator
- Rohit as Vikky (Young)
- Asqa Shakeel as Rabia (Young)
- Yousuf as Vegetable seller
- Hareem Qureshi as Meharun Nisa (young)
- Sajida as Midwife

== Awards ==
The 1st Indus Drama Awards 2005

- Winner: Best TV Series Award for Maa Aur Mamta
- Winner: Best TV Series Writer Award for Maa Aur Mamta
- Winner: Best TV Series Director Award for Maa Aur Mamta

== See also ==
- Murad
- Ishq Ki Inteha
