= Adnan Shah Tipu =

Pakistani actor

- عدنان شاہ
- Born: Adnan Shah; 1 January 1970 (age 56); Faisalabad, Punjab, Pakistan
- Other name: Tipu
- Education: University of the Punjab
- Occupation: Actor
- Years active: 1998–present
- Spouse: Hajra (m. 2010)
- Children: 4

Adnan Shah "Tipu" is a Pakistani actor known for his supporting, comic and villainy roles. Tipu has worked in Pakistani drama and film industry for almost three decades.

== Early life and education ==
Born into a Punjabi family in Faisalabad, Punjab, Tipu left his home at the age of 16 and before becoming an actor he used to do mimicry of stars and celebrities. He graduated from the University of the Punjab, Lahore.

His father Ghazanfar Ali Shah was a politician affiliated with the Pakistan People's Party, even going to jail because of his support for Zulfikar Ali Bhutto, while Tipu himself, during his college days, was active in student politics with the Jamaat-e-Islami.

== Career ==
Having moved to Karachi to work in a bank, Tipu was encouraged to join the entertainment industry by Nighat Chaudhry, later impressing producer Ghazanfar Ali with his singing skills in an informal setting. Through Nighat's recommendation, Tipu started his career as an actor in 1998 with Sassi Punnu. Later, he gained popularity through a sitcom titled Sub Set Hai created by Azfar Ali, which was aired on Indus Vision in 2001.

Tipu has appeared in many television serials in Pakistan such as Makan (2006) and the sitcom series Kis Din Mera Viyah Howay Ga (2011). He made his debut as a film actor in the 2003 film Khamosh Pani. In 2008, he appeared in the drama film Ramchand Pakistani, followed by his Bollywood debut film Kajraare (2010), directed by Pooja Bhatt. Tipu starred in Josh: Independence Through Unity and grabbed a nomination in ARY Film Award for Best Actor.

Tipu played a villain in Dukhtar (2014) and also starred in the Indian film Welcome to Karachi (2015).

In an interview with The Express Tribune, Tipu said regarding the film: "I am impressed by the work, not by the name of an actor. It is true both (Jackky and Arshad) are good actors but even if I end up appearing in the same frame with legendary actors like Marlon Brando, Al Pacino or Dilip Kumar I will not let myself become overawed by their presence but will instead try to do what I do best and give my best performance."

In 2016, he appeared in Ashir Azeem's political-thriller Maalik which was banned in Pakistan within a few days of its release.

== Filmography ==
=== Films ===
Key
†	Denotes films that have not yet been released

List of film credits for Adnan Shan Tipu
Year	Film	Role	Notes
2001	Out of Sync	Squabbling Drive	Short film
2003	Khamosh Pani	Mazhar	
2008	Ramchand Pakistani	Sharma	
2009	Yarana		Pashto language film
2010	Kajraare	Babar Altaf Khan	Bollywood debut
2013	Josh: Independence Through Unity	Gulsher	
2014	Dukhtar	Ghorzang Khan	
2015	Dho Dala: The Sin Washer	Tipu	Short film
2015	Welcome 2 Karachi	Azhar Baloch	Bollywood film
2016	Maalik	Fariday	
2017	Punjab Nahi Jaungi	Shoukat Ali	Cameo appearance
2018	Saat Din Mohabbat In	Sadiq Moti	
2018	Jackpot		
2019	Chhalawa	Chaudhary Nazakut	
2020	Stray Dogs Come Out at Night	Khurram	
2021	Hona Tha Pyar	Tameezuddin	Telefilm
2022	Dum Mastam		
2022	Chaudhry – The Martyr		
2023	Daadal	Abid	
2023	In Flames	Uncle Nasir	
2023	Dhai Chaal		
2025	Hum Sub		
2025	Ghost School		
2026	Mera Lyari	Faiq Khan	
TBA	Zeher-e-Ishq †	TBA	
TBA	Once Upon a Time in Karachi †	TBA	

=== Television serials ===
List of television credits for Adnan Shan Tipu
Year	Title	Role	Channel	Notes
2001	Sub Set Hai	Pintoo	Indus Vision	Sitcom
2006	Makan	Jaffer's friend	Geo Entertainment	
2008	Ab Set Hai	Pintoo	AAG TV	Sitcom
2010	Zerooos	Addu	Hum TV	Sitcom
2011	Jal Pari		Geo Entertainment	
2011–18	Kis Din Mera Viyah Howay Ga	Inspector Saleem	Geo Entertainment	Sitcom
2012	Aitraf	Tanveer	ARY Digital	
2013	Ghundi	Mateen	Hum Sitaray	
2014	Bay Emaan Mohabbat	Naeem	ARY Digital	
2016	Preet Na Kariyo Koi	Mushtaq	Hum TV	
2016–17	Noor-e-Zindagi		Geo Entertainment	
2016–17	Hatheli	Saleem	Hum TV	
2016–17	Khuda Mera Bhi Hai		ARY Digital	
2018	Baby	Saarim	Express Entertainment	
2018	Suno Chanda	Jalal Khan	Hum TV	
2019	Suno Chanda 2	Jalal Khan	Hum TV	
2019	Mein Jeena Chahti Hoon		PTV Home	
2019–20	Tera Yahan Koi Nahin		Hum TV	
2020	Zebaish	Pirzada Qasim	Hum TV	
2021	Dil Na Umeed To Nahi	Ikram	Hum TV	
2021	Yaar Na Bichray	Bashir Uddin	Hum TV	
2021	Parizaad	Akbar	Hum TV	
2022	Kaisi Teri Khudgarzi	Sheru	ARY Digital	
2023	Kabuli Pulao	Qayyum	Green Entertainment	
2024	Standup Girl	Baray Mamu	Green Entertainment	
2024	Zard Patton Ka Bunn	Moulvi Yousuf	Hum TV	
2025	My Dear Cinderella	Mamu	Hum TV	
2026	Sirf Shabana	Nusrat	Hum TV	

== Awards and nominations ==
List of awards or nominations received by Adnan Shan Tipu
Year	Nominee / work	Award	Result
2006	Adnan Shah	1st Indus Drama Awards for Best Supporting Actor	Nominated
2014	Adnan Shah	ARY Film Award for Best Actor	Nominated
2019	Tipu Shah	7th Hum Awards for Best Supporting Actor	Nominated
