= 1st Indus Drama Awards =

Award

The 1st Indus Drama Awards
- Indus Drama Awards Statue and Logo
- Awarded for: Excellence in drama achievements.
- Sponsored by: Dulux
- Date: 23 September 2005; 1 October 2005 (televised in Pakistan and UAE)
- Location: PAF Museum
- Country: Pakistan
- Presented by: Indus TV Network
- First award: 2005
- Website: Indus Media Group

External videos
- Trailer of The 1st Indus Drama Awards

The 1st Indus Drama Awards ceremony, presented by Indus TV Network, sponsored by Dulux, took place on 23 September 2005, at PAF Museum, Karachi. The ceremony was recorded, and was scheduled to be televised in Pakistan and UAE on 1 October 2005, by Indus TV. It was produced by chairman Ghazanfar Ali.

The awards were hosted by actor Shahood Alvi and co-hosted by Sehar Imran.

== Ceremony information ==
The drama awards were a follow-up of the IM Music awards, art of the INDUS NETWORK, which were held at the D.H.A Golf Club. The stage was set against a giant plasma screen and for the first time a live orchestra had been arranged.

The four series competing for the most prestigious honours were 'Maa Aur Mamta', 'Ambulance', 'Mera Naam Hai Mohabbat' and 'Karachi law'. Kamran Qureshi's drama series Maa Aur Mamta was considered most successful with seven awards; Qureshi brought his mother Shagufta Yousuf to receive it on his behalf. Natasha D’souza received her trophy for the best supporting actress in Ambulance. Shafi Mohammad won the best supporting actor for his role in 'Maa aur Mamta'. The best actress in drama series was Shehla Qureshi for her role in Mehak while Humayun Saeed won the equivalent for Mujrim.

Further entertainment was provided by Humayun and Sonu, both of whom danced, Sonu to Atif Aslam's remix song 'Woh Lamhe'. Maa and Mamta also won an extra title when Sohail Asghar was conferred a special award for his role of a eunuch called Saima in Murad.

A tribute was performed for Najam-uz-Zaman, who had died in Canada. Najam was a prominent figure in Indus Music and was also one of Indus TV's founding members, besides the current owner, Ghazanfar.

The best serial writer award went to Umera Ahmed for Wajood-e-Laraib. The best actress in a drama serial went to Afreen for role in Azal, for which her male counterpart was Faisal Rehman for his contributions in Azal.

The Best Serial award went to Wajood-e-Laraib. Adnan Siddiqui, Faisal Qureshi, and Fahad Mustafa received the trophy. Adnan dedicated the trophy to his newborn baby, while the rest thanked the crowd for their involvement.

Qavi Khan received a standing ovation for his contributions to the TV world with the late Shahzad Khalil. Ghazanfar himself presented this award to Khalil's wife Badar Khalil.

=== Awards ===
Winners are listed first followed by nominees.

Best TV Series Categories
Best TV Series	Best Director Series
Winner: Maa Aur Mamta - Iram Qureshi & Kamran Qureshi; Ambulance - Angeline Malik; Mera Naam Hai Mohabbat - Ghazanfar Ali; Karachi law - Ghazanfar Ali	Winner: Kamran Qureshi - Maa Aur Mamta; Angeline Malik - Ambulance; Kashif Jaffri - Mera Naam Hai Mohabbat (Teray Kochay Me); Owais Khan - Karachi law (Anjaam)
Best Actor Series	Best Actress Series
Winner: Humayun Saeed - Maa Aur Mamta (Mujrim); Tauqeer Nasir - Maa Aur Mamta (Mazloom); Imran Abbas - Mera Naam Hai Mohabbat (Teray Kochay Me); Talat Hussain - Karachi law (Anjaam)	Winner: Shehla Qureshi –Maa Aur Mamta (Mehak); Ghazal Salam - Maa Aur Mamta (Mazloom); Rubina Ashraf - Maa Aur Mamta (Masoom); Javeria Saud - Mera Naam Hai Mohabbat (Teray Kochay Me)
Best Supporting Actor Series	Best Supporting Actress Series
Winner: Shafi Muhammad Shah - Maa Aur Mamta (Mannat); Shakeel - Mera Naam Hai Mohabbat (Teray Kochay Me); Sohail Asghar - Karachi law (Anjaam); Adnan Shah (Tipu) - Ambulance (Naya Rang)	Winner: Natasha D’souza –Ambulance (Naya Rang); Sara Loren - Mera Naam Hai Mohabbat (Teray Kochay Me); Tehreem Zuberi - Maa Aur Mamta (Mujrim); Ayesha Sana - Karachi law (Anjaam)
Best TV Series Writer	Special Award
Winner: Zafar Mairaj - Maa Aur Mamta (Masoom); Dr. Waseem - Ambulance (Naya Rang); Zoha Hassan - Mera Naam Hai Mohabbat (Teray Kochay Mein); Pervaiz Watto - Karachi law (Anjaam)	Winner: Sohail Asghar - Special Award for outstanding performance in Murad (Maa Aur Mamta)
Best Serial Categories
Best Serial	Best Director Serial
Winner: Wujood-e-Laraib - Sakina Samo; Bheegi Palkain - Ghazanfar Ali; Azal - Owais Khan	Winner: Sakina Samo- Wujood-e-Laraib; Irfan Ahmad - Bheegi Palkain; Owais Khan - Azal
Best Actor Serial	Best Actress Serial
Winner: Faisal Rehman - Azal; Adnan Siddiqui - Wujood-e-Laraib; Fahad Mustafa - Bheegi Palkain	Winner: Afreen - Azal; Faiza Hasan - Wujood-e-Laraib; Fiza Ali - Bheegi Palkain
Best Supporting Actor Serial	Best Supporting Actress Serial
Winner: Faisal Qureshi - Wujood-e-Laraib; Farhan Ali Agha - Bheegi Palkain; Hameed Sheikh - Azal	Winner: Sonia Khan - Bheegi Palkain; Madiha Gohar - Azal; Zeba Ali - Wujood-e-Laraib
Best TV Serial Writer	
Winner: Umera Ahmed - Wujood-e-Laraib; Tahira Wasti - Bheegi Palkain; Owais Khan - Azal	
Best Sitcom Categories
Best Sitcom Writer	Best Director Sitcom
Winner: Sajid Hasan; Vasay Chaudhry; Syed Nabeel	Winner: Ahmed Zain; Sajid Hasan; Fawad Wyne
Best Actor Sitcom	Best Actress Sitcom
Winner: Behroze Sabzwari; Ismail Tara; Ahmad Ali Butt	Winner: Samina Ahmad; Mehak Ali; Farah Tufail
Best Magazine Show	
Winner: Rizwan Jaffar	

== Honorary Indus Drama Awards ==
The Indus Media Group presented Special Awards during the ceremony. These are usually are not a part of specific category, but a special honor for artists related to drama.

=== Special Contribution for Script Writing ===
- Ashfaq Ahmed

=== Special Contribution for Comedy ===
- Moin Akhtar

=== Special Award for Outstanding Contribution to TV ===
- Shahzad Khalil

=== Special Contributing to Drama ===
- Qavi Khan

=== Special Award for Direction of Fifty Fifty ===
- Shoaib Mansoor

=== Special Award for outstanding performance in Murad ===
- Sohail Asghar

=== Special Award for Tribute ===
- Najam-uz-Zaman (Award received by Najam-uz-Zaman's Mother)

=== Special Award for performance in Fifty Fifty ===
- Zeba Shahnaz

== Multiple awards and nominations ==
=== Series with multiple nominations ===
Nominations	Series
11	Maa Aur Mamta
5	Ambulance
7	Mera Naam Hai Mohabbat
6	Karachi law

=== Series with multiple awards ===
Awards	Series
7	Maa Aur Mamta
1	Ambulance
0	Mera Naam Hai Mohabbat
0	Karachi law

=== Serials with multiple nominations ===
Nominations	Series
7	Wujood-e-Laraib
7	Bheegi Palkain
7	Azal

=== Serials with multiple awards ===
Awards	Series
4	Wujood-e-Laraib
	Bheegi Palkain
2	Azal

== Presenters and performers ==
The following individuals and groups, listed in order of appearance, presented awards or performed musical numbers.

=== Presenters ===
Name(s)	Role
Moin Akhter; Mahnoor Baloch	Presenters of the awards for Best Director Drama Series
Rubina Ashraf; Shakeel	Presenters of the award for Best Writer Drama Series
Fariha Pervez; Faisal Qureshi	Presenter of the award for Best Drama Series Award
Firdous Jamal; Sonia Rehman	Presenters of the award for Best Actress Drama Series in a Leading Role
Aijaz Aslam; Badar Khalil	Presenters of the award for Best Actress Drama Series in a Supporting Role
Saba Hameed; Faisal Rehman	Presenters of the award for Best Actor Drama Series in a Leading Role
Arjumand Rahim; Adnan Siddiqui	Presenters of the award for Best Actor Drama Series in a Supporting Role
Irfan Khoosat	Presenters of the award for Best Director Drama Serial
Shamil Khan; Sania Saeed	Presenter of the award for Best Writer Serial
Ali Azmat; Saira Kazmi	Presenters of the award for Best TV Serial
Sohail Ansar; Qavi Khan	Presenters of the awards for Best Actress Drama Serial in a Leading Role
Ayesha Omer; Ather Ansari	Presenters of the award for Best Actress Drama Serial in a Supporting Role
Vaneeza Ahmad; Bilal Jaudet	Presenters of the awards for Best Actor Drama Serial in a Leading Role
Sohail Asghar; Arjumand Rahim	Presenters of the awards for Best Actor Drama Serial in a Supporting Role
Maria Wasti	Presenters of the award for of Best Director for Sitcom
Sadaf Pervaiz	Presenters of the award for of Best Magazine Show
Humayun Saeed	Presenter of Special Award for performance in Comedy Series Fifty Fifty
Irfan Khoosat; Sania Saeed	Presenter of Special Award for Director of Comedy Series Fifty Fifty
Sultana Siddiqui	Presenter of Special Award for Outstanding Performance in Acting for Murad
Saira Kazmi	Presenter of the award for Special Award for Comedy
Atiqa Odho	Presenters of the award for Special Award for Tribute (After Death)
Nadeem Saeed; Babra Sharif	Presenter of the award for Special Award for Contribution in Drama
Shakeel	Presenter of the award for Special Award for Script Writing
Ghazanfar Ali; Agha Nasir	Presenters of the awards for Special Award for Outstanding Contribution to TV

=== Performers ===
Name(s)	Role	Performed
Humayun Saeed with Dance Group	Performer	on a musical numbers 'O Baby Dance with me' 'Sali to Mani nahi' by Shehzad Roy & 'Us ke Ankhon me Jado'.
Fariha Pervez with Sonu Dangerous	Performer	on a musical number 'Dil Ko Na Rokna'.
Sara Loren with Dance Group	Performer	on a musical number 'Kajraray'.
Aijaz Aslam with Dance Group	Performer	on a musical number 'Kajraray'.
Faisal Qureshi with Dance Group	Performer	on a musical number 'Kajraray'.
Sonu Dangerous with Dance Group	Performer	on a musical numbers 'Meri Ankheyan' 'Ap Ke Kashish' 'Woh Lamhay'.
Nad-e-Ali with Dance Group	Performer	on a musical number 'If You Wanna Live your Life' 'Man Oma Deyam'.

== See also ==
- List of Asian television awards
- Indus Telefilm Festival
- Lux Style Awards
- Hum Awards
