= Dhuwan =

Pakistani television drama show

- Genre: Tragedy; Action; Thriller
- Created by: Ashir Azeem
- Written by: Ashir Azeem
- Directed by: Sajjad Ahmed; Roamer Khan
- Starring: Ashir Azeem; Nabeel; Zubair Khan Achakzai; Nazli Nasr; Asal Din Khan; Wajid Ali Shah; Nayyar Ejaz; Azra Aftab
- Country of origin: Pakistan
- Original language: Urdu
- No. of episodes: 11

Production
- Producer: Sajjad Ahmed
- Camera setup: Tahir Bukhari

Original release
- Network: PTV Home
- Release: 1994 – 1994

Dhuwan (Urdu: دھواں, English: Smoke) is a 1994 Pakistani television series originally aired on Pakistan Television Corporation channel in 1994.

The play is based on a story of five friends, who take up the challenge to fight against terrorists and drug dealers. The serial is known for its neat outdoor shooting and liberal use of ammunition to convey realism.

== Plot ==
The story of this drama revolves around five young friends, each with a different background, who want to bring a positive change in society in order to serve their country. Azhar (Ashir Azeem) is newly appointed as an assistant superintendent of police. Earlier he had completed his engineering degree but to be able to contribute to the society, he opted for the police job. His first placement is in Quetta, where he finds his old friends: Dawood (Nabeel) who is a medical doctor. Their local friend Naveed also known as Nido (Asal Din Khan) who looks after his father's business. One of their old acquaintance Wajid is a crime reporter in a local newspaper. Naveed and Wajid train with their friend Hameed who is the owner of an arms store.

Azhar was being monitored by an undercover officer Sara (Nazli Nasr) posing as a UN worker. She most likely was providing information to the ministry in Islamabad. Their first meeting was on a flight to Quetta. Azhar is handed over a case of narcotics by the ministry and he is advised to assemble a team to carry out operations which cannot be shared with the local police, to avoid any possible tip-offs to the criminals. These five friends begin to train as a crack squad. They also begin to create a computerized database of National Identity Cards, passports, and vehicle data.

== Cast and characters ==
=== Main characters ===
- Ashir Azeem as A.S.P Azhar: An engineer who leaves behind his job at a major corporation and enrolls as a police officer. He is stationed at a precinct in Quetta as an assistant superintendent of police. While in Quetta, he meets his old friends from college and teams up with them to rid the city of major crimes, such as drug trafficking, extortion and similar terrorist activities.
- Nabeel as Dr. Dawood: A medical doctor working at a local clinic. He rents a house along with Azhar and joins his team. He later falls in love with Uzma, a girl they rescue from Abdul Salaam's hideout in Afghanistan.
- Asal Din Khan as Naveed: He is known to his friends as Nido, a nickname for Naveed. Naveed is employed at one of his father's factories.
- Wajid Ali Shah as Wajid: A journalist working for a local newspaper reporting on crimes.
- Zubair Khan Achakzai as Hameed: A local arms dealer who owns an arms and ammunition shop in Quetta.

=== Other characters ===
- Nazli Nasr as Sara: A female undercover agent keeping an eye on Azhar and his team. She works for an official ministerial oversight committee tasked to keep Azhar's operational activities under review and poses as a United Nations worker.
- Nayyar Ejaz as Salman: A business tycoon and drug kingpin who has connections to narcotics and other criminal activities.
- Rija Amir as Rija: She works for Salman.
- Rauf Bhattias Ajmal: The Station House Officer (thaanedar) at the precinct Azhar is stationed at. A seasoned police officer, Ajmal is unnerved to corrupt practices in the police advising Azhar to give in to the same.
- Fayyaz Ahmed Parwana as Bashir: The "singing" housekeeper at Azhar and Dawood's residence.
- Azra Aftab as Dawood's mother

== Production ==
=== Development ===
Ashir Azeem wrote the script for Dhuwan during his time at the Civil Services Academy where he met several police personnel. Being inexperienced at writing scripts for television, Azeem initially wrote the story in the form of a novel and later developed it into a formal script on the advice of a television executive. Azeem's work was primarily written in English and PTV's in-house screenwriters had to translate it into an Urdu script. Azeem later revealed that the translated screenplay couldn't completely realize his conceptualization and he had to rework some parts.

=== Music ===
The background score is composed by Farrukh Abid. The serial also features a popular Punjabi song of Nusrat Fateh Ali Khan, "Kise da yar na vichray (کسے دا یار نہ وچھڑے)".

== Reception ==
The drama serial was praised for its effective use of cinematography in conveying realism, especially for its live action sequences. Its popularity even compelled the Pakistani youth to join up with the police in serving the country.

== Trivia ==
- The five letter Urdu word Dhuwan (دھواں) forms an acronym of the names of the five friends in this order: ﺩ for Dawood, ﺡ for Hameed, ﻭ for Wajid, ﺍ for Azhar and ﻥ for Naveed.
- Ashir Azeem served in Civil Service of Pakistan as AC Customs.
