= Dugdugi =

- Screen title
- Genre: Sitcom
- Created by: Nabeel
- Written by: Khurram Abbas; Wajih Warsi
- Directed by: Rana Rizwan
- Starring: Ashraf Khan; Nausheen Shah; Azfar Rehman; Durdana Butt; Shagufta Ejaz
- Country of origin: Pakistan
- Original language: Urdu
- No. of episodes: 208

Production
- Producer: Nabeel

Original release
- Network: ARY Digital
- Release: 9 July 2011 – 11 September 2015

Dugdugi (Urdu: ڈگڈگی) is a 2011 Pakistani comedy sitcom which was shown on Sundays on ARY Digital. The title refers to a small double-sided handheld drum used by monkey charmers. The show follows Azfar, a jobless youth being humiliated by his in-laws, and stars Azfar Rehman, Durdana Butt, Shagufta Ejaz, Ashraf Khan and Nausheen Shah. The show was conceived and produced by Nabeel.

== Cast ==
- Azfar Rehman as Azfar Rehman "Mr Fraudiya" (2011-2013)
- Agha Shiraz as Agha Shearaz Mr Fraudiya" (2013-2015)
- Durdana Butt as Durdana Butt, Ashraf's mother
- Shagufta Ejaz as Shagufta
- Ashraf Khan as Ashraf
- Nausheen Shah as Nousheen Durdana's daughter
