= Indus Telefilm Festival =

- Excellence in filmmaking
- Opening film: Insan Aur Shaitan
- Closing film: World Ka Center
- Location: Karachi, Pakistan
- Founded: June 2003
- Awards received: Kamran Qureshi for Best TV Film and Director for Murad
- Awards: Indus TV Awards
- Film titles: Insan Aur Shaitan, Jahan Rahmat Qaid Hai, Khuwab Kinara, Murad, Marhoom Colonel Ki Baitiaan, Mera Intizar Karna, and World Ka Center.
- Directors: Jawad Bashir, Shahid Shafaat, Sohail Javed, Kamran Qureshi, Mehreen Jabbar, Jahanzaib Sohail and Faisal Rehman.
- Writers: Shakeel Awan, Shahid Shafaat, Khurram Shariq, Zafar Mairaj, Nasreen Rehman, Arbad Abdul Wakeel and Bilal Manto.
- Starring: Sania Saeed, Humayun Saeed, Samina Ahmad, Yasir Nawaz, Sohail Asghar, Qazi Wajid, Ahsan Khan, Nabeel Zafar, Adnan Siddiqui, Arjumand Rahim, Javeria Abbasi, Zaheen Tahira and many more.
- Hosted by: Indus TV Network
- No. of films: Seven
- Festival date: June - July, 2003
- Language: Urdu

The Indus Telefilm Festival was a Pakistani film festival held in 2003. The festival showed films that had been filmed the previous year. Seven films were shortlisted for the main competition, the winner of which received a prize of RS 500,000.

The event was the first of its kind by the Indus TV Network to promote creativity in storytelling among amateurs as well as professionals, producers and directors. Iqbal Ansari, Director Programmes of Indus TV Network remarked at the conclusion of the Indus Telefilm Festival 2003. "It's up to the director to have the courage to explore various methods. Our objective, which was to encourage diversity of direction and content treatment, was achieved."

== Jury ==
The festival had a jury composed of writers, directors, actors and journalists to judge the three best telefilms. The jury included Ashfaq Ahmed, Bano Qudsia, Talat Hussain, Kanwar Aftab Ahmad, Shafiq Ahmed, Iqbal Ansari, Khursheed Haider and Noorul Huda Shah.

== Winners ==
- Kamran Qureshi - First Winner: Best TV Film and Director for Murad with a cash prize of PKR 500,000/-
- Mehreen Jabbar - Second Winner: Best TV Film and Director for Marhoom Colonel Ki Baitiaan with cash prize of PKR 200,000/-
- Faisal Rehman - Third Winner: Best TV Film and Director for World Ka Center with a cash prize of PKR 100,000/-

== See also ==
- List of Asian television awards
- The 1st Indus Drama Awards
- Lux Style Awards
- Hum Awards
