= Indonesian Broadcasting Commission Awards =

- Awarded for: Excellences in Indonesian television
- Country: Indonesia
- Presented by: Indonesian Broadcasting Commission
- First award: 2006
- Website: www.kpi.go.id

The Indonesian Broadcasting Commission Awards (Indonesian: Anugerah Komisi Penyiaran Indonesia, also known as Anugerah KPI) is an Indonesian radio and television awards presented by the broadcasting regulator Indonesian Broadcasting Commission (KPI). The award is routinely held as a token of appreciation by the KPI for the hard work of broadcasters which strives to present interesting programming while remaining in high quality.

The awards is broadcast in selected television networks, which is different every year.

== System ==
In Anugerah KPI, nominees are divided into two groups: the national television broadcasters (both public and private), and the local radio and television broadcasters. Furthermore, these programs are judged by a team of judges who are "independent, credible and experts in their fields".

For judging, the KPI collaborates with several people who have competence in the broadcasting field, and involve a number of related institutions such as the Indonesian Child Protection Commission, especially in relation to children programming. The KPI members and several appointed persons together in a judging team to provide an assessment of programs, both television and radio, which are considered has the highest quality and educative.

== See also ==
- Panasonic Gobel Awards
- Indonesian Television Awards
- List of Asian television awards
