= Asian television awards =

Asian television awards may refer to:

- Asian Television Awards, a set of awards given in Malaysia each year for the Asian television industry
- List of Asian television awards, a list of awards for television in Asia
