= Kyun Tum Say Itna Pyar Hai =

- Directed by: Ajab Gul
- Written by: Ajab Gul
- Produced by: Saqib Khan; Ajab Gul
- Starring: Arbaaz Khan; Veena Malik; Ajab Gul; Babrak Shah; Nadeem; Tahira Wasti; Nighat Butt
- Cinematography: Waqar Bukhari
- Edited by: Qurbaan
- Music by: Ajab Gul
- Release date: 29 April 2005
- Country: Pakistan
- Language: Urdu

Kyun Tum Say Itna Pyar Hai is a 2005 Pakistani Urdu-language film starring Arbaaz Khan, Veena Malik, Babrik Shah, Ajab Gul, and Sana Nawaz. It was the second directorial project of Ajab Gul after Khoey Ho Tum Kahan. This film was directed by Ajab Gul.

== Plot ==
The families of the two, a former judge (Nadeem) and ex-chief minister (Talat Hussain) are interlinked by nuptials but do not serve as bonds. Talat is a power-hungry politician who resorts to anything—bribery, killings, abductions—to achieve his goals. He is currently under investigation, and the man leading the case is Nadeem's character, a traditional upstanding citizen and a champion of values and justice.

The only blemish in Nadeem’s life is his two wives, one being Ajab Gul’s mother with whom he has a strained relationship. Police officer Babrak Shah by the other wife is acknowledged as his son and so the stepbrothers have a strong dislike for each other. They also share the love of the same girl (Talat's daughter played by Veena Malik) whose marriage to Babrak deepens the enmity and a sense of deprivation in Gul.

Television and film actors such as Tahira Wasti and Nighat Chaudhry play supporting roles in the movie.

== Cast ==
- Arbaaz Khan
- Veena Malik
- Ajab Gul
- Sana Nawaz
- Rasheed Naz
- Babrak Shah
- Asif Khan
- Nadeem
- Tahira Wasti
- Nighat Chaudhry
- Raza
