= Maharaj Ghulam Hussain Kathak =

Pakistani dancer (1905–2001)

Maharaj Ghulam Hussain
- Born: 1899 or 1905; Calcutta, India
- Died: 28 June 2001 or 28 June 2001; Lahore, Pakistan
- Occupations: Dancer, teacher
- Dancing career
- Dances: Kathak

Maharaj Ghulam Hussain Kathak was a classical dancer and teacher.

== Early life ==
Ghulam Hussain was born in Calcutta in a Syed family..

Initially, he worked at Agha Hashar Kashmiri's drama company, where he once saw Acchan Mahraj's performance. This was his first encounter with Kathak. After the downfall of drama in 1930 as an art, he along with other artists gathered there in Rampur where he became ganda band disciple of Acchan Maharaj and learnt from him.

== Migration to Pakistan ==
Maharaj Ghulam Hussain Kathak migrated to Karachi after the partition and lived there before moving to Lahore in his later years. He has been a major exponent in the arts and teaching of classical kathak dance in Pakistan, for over four decades.

== Legacy ==
Maharaj Ghulam Hussain Kathak was the guru of Pakistani classical dancer Nahid Siddiqui, Nighat Chaodhry. Fasih Ur Rehman, a discipline of Ghulam Hussain, has been carrying on his legacy.
