= Fasih Ur Rehman =

Kathak maestro

- Born: Lahore, Pakistan
- Education: Maharaj Ghulam Hussain Kathak; Kumudini Lakhia
- Known for: Kathak
- Relatives: Rehman (uncle); Faisal Rehman (brother)
- Awards: Tamgha-e-Imtiaz 2006
- Website: www.fasihurrehman.com

Fasih Ur Rehman is a Kathak maestro from Pakistan. He has been a disciple of Maharaj Ghulam Hussain Kathak for 20 years, (1977–1998) in Lahore, Pakistan, and later continued his studies with Kumudini Lakhia in London and Ahmedabad, India. He is the main male Kathak dancer of Pakistan with more than 30 years of Kathak experience.

== First years and background ==
From a royal Afghan lineage, his mother was closely related to princess Fatima Sultana of Kaboul, sister of King Amanullah Khan of Afghanistan. Fasih is son of the cinematographer Massud-Ur-Rehman, brother of Faisal Rehman and nephew of Bollywood actor Rehman.

He was born and grew up in Lahore, Pakistan. Since he was a child, he was fascinated with dancing. Encouraged by his close family he decided to observe Maharaj Ghulam Hussein's lessons, and then started learning from him. Later, he also started performing on stage under the direction of Maharaj Ghulam.

== Career ==
Started his public appearances starting the 1980s decade for several embassies and numerous private performances. Then he danced under direction of Kumudini Lakhia in Pakistan and England in the 1990s. Once he started to choreograph in Pakistan he found a difficult sociopolitic environment (see Culture of Pakistan) fact he could get over becoming a leading figure in Kathak scene worldwide). He has participated in events in Italy, U.K., Tunisia, Dubai, U.S., Pakistan, Japan, London, Spain, among others. Worked closely with the Kathak Society TKS) in Karachi during 1998–2001. Continues his professional development teaching regularly in London and other points in Europe and Asia, and performing in diverse international stages

== Awards ==
In 2006 he received Tamgha-e-Imtiaz, Medal of Excellence given by Pakistan State to high achievement for his outstanding career in arts.
