= Nazli Nasr =

Pakistani actress

- نازلی نصر
- Born: 22 March 1979 (age 47); Karachi, Pakistan
- Education: University of Karachi
- Occupation: Actress
- Years active: 1990s – present
- Spouse: Mohsin Mirza (m. 2013)
- Children: 2

Nazli Nasr is a Pakistani actress. She is known for her roles in dramas Dhuwan, Mere Humdum Mere Dost, Zamani Manzil Kay Maskharay and Zip Bus Chup Raho.

== Career ==
Nazli made her debut as an actress on PTV in 1990s. She appeared in drama Dhuwan as Sara in 1994. She was noted her roles in dramas Zip Bus Chup Raho, Mehar Bano aur Shah Bano, Family 93, Hum Tehray Gunahgaar and Meri Dulari. She also appeared in dramas Malika-e-Aliya, Piya Mann Bhaye, Roshini and Mere Humdum Mere Dost. Since then she appeared in dramas Teri Meri Kahani, Hari Hari Churiyaan, Makafaat, Hina Ki Khushboo and Zamani Manzil Kay Maskharay.

== Filmography ==
=== Television ===
Year	Title	Role	Network
1993	Hum Log	Bibi Khatoon	PTV
1994	Dhuwan	Sara	PTV
1995	Red Card	Tahira	STN
1996	Zarb Taqseem	Malka	PTV
1997	Family 93	Faiza	PTV
2004	Ana	Nusrat	Geo Entertainment
2005	Wajood-E-Lariab	Arshi	Indus TV
2009	Tanveer Fatima (B.A)	Tahira	Geo TV
2011	Zip Bus Chup Raho	Munazzah	Geo TV
2011	Dil To Kacha Hay Ji	Parveen's mother	ARY Digital
2012	Be Aemaan	Neelofer	PTV
2012	Mehar Bano aur Shah Bano	Rani Aapa	Hum TV
2012	Behkawa	Sweetie's mother	Geo Entertainment
2012	Sabz Qadam	Rahat Begum	ARY Digital
2013	Dehleez	Reema's mother	ARY Digital
2013	Meri Dulari	Abdar's mother	Geo TV
2013	Khelo Pyar Ki Bazi	Halima	TV One
2014	Hum Tehray Gunahgaar	Ayesha	Hum TV
2014	Main Soteli	Savera's mother	Urdu 1
2014	Chingari	Omer's mother	Express Entertainment
2014	Malika-e-Aliya	Sultana	Geo Entertainment
2014	Mere Humdum Mere Dost	Zainab	Urdu 1
2015	Paiwand	Tabassum	ARY Digital
2015	Dil-e-Barbad	Farhat	ARY Digital
2015	Piya Mann Bhaye	Shaista	Geo Entertainment
2016	Bade Dhokhe Hain Iss Raah Mein	Sania	A-Plus
2016	Aslam Bhai & Company	Shabnam	Express Entertainment
2016	Sangdil	Farkhanda	Geo TV
2016	Roshni	Mumtaz	Geo Entertainment
2017	Agar Tum Saath Ho	Maria's mother	Express Entertainment
2017	Zamani Manzil Kay Maskharay	Ismataara	Geo Entertainment
2017	Rishtay Kachay Dhagoon Se	Zahida	A-Plus
2017	Hina Ki Khushboo	Iffat	Geo Entertainment
2017	Hari Hari Churiyaan	Saleema	Geo Entertainment
2018	Dard Ka Rishta	Rabia	ARY Digital
2018	Teri Meri Kahani	Najima	Hum TV
2019	Bhanwar	Fouzia	Express Entertainment
2019	Makafaat	Naseema	Geo Entertainment
2019	Bhool	Seema	ARY Digital
2020	Mein Rani	Rani's mother	Express Entertainment
2021	Khwaab Nagar Ki Shehzadi	Shamim	ARY Digital
2022	Sirat-e-Mustaqeem Season 2	Aapa Begum	Geo TV
2022	Meri Guriya	Naz Begum	Aan TV
2022	Fraud	Shazia	ARY Digital
2023	Hum 2 Hamaray 100 Season 2	Ayesha	Aan TV
2023	Bewafa	Musarrat	Aan TV
2023	Sar-e-Rah	Amir's mother	ARY Digital
2023	Ahsaas	Jahanara	Express Entertainment
2023	Kalank	Hameeda	Geo Entertainment
2023	Na Tumhain Khabar Na Humien Khabar	Nuzhat	Aan TV
2023	Gumn	Mrs. Shakir	Green Entertainment
2023	Khushbo Mein Basay Khat	Bilqees	Hum TV
2024	Saraab	Nafisa	Aur Life
2024	Dikhawa Season 5	Najma	Geo Entertainment
2024	Meray Ranjhna	Mehwish	Green Entertainment
2024	Kaffara	Najma	Geo Entertainment
2024	Aafat	Mehrunnisa	Geo TV
2025	Na Tum Jano Na Hum	Ali's mother	Green Entertainment
2025	Mohra	Kaneez Begum	Geo TV
2025	Mafaad Parast	Salma	Geo Entertainment

=== Telefilm ===
Year	Title	Role
2011	Gharonda	Shagufta
2012	Teeja Party	Musarrat
2013	Dulha Bana Bakra	Fareeda
2018	Beech Ki Aarh	Ayesha
2018	Band Toh Baje Ga	Amir's mother
2018	Hai Suriya	Batool Bano

=== Film ===
Year	Title	Role
2022	Khushkhabri Kay Baad	Begum
