= Mehar Bano aur Shah Bano =

Pakistani television series

- Title screen
- Genre: Drama
- Written by: Seema Ghazal
- Story by: Noorul Huda Shah
- Directed by: Fahim Burney
- Starring: Mahnoor Baloch; Sara Loren; Noman Ijaz; Adnan Siddiqui; Azfar Rehman
- Country of origin: Pakistan
- Original language: Urdu
- No. of episodes: 17

Production
- Executive producer: Shah Hussain
- Producers: Syed Afzal Ali; Ahtisham Khalid; Sohail Lodhi
- Cinematography: Adnan Ahmed Khan
- Editors: Syed Ovais Alam; Razi Ahmed Afaaq
- Running time: ~40 minutes
- Production companies: Mushroom Productions; Noor ul Huda Shah Productions

Original release
- Network: Hum TV
- Release: 4 January – 25 April 2012

Mehar Bano aur Shah Bano (Urdu: مہر بانو اور شاه بانو) is a Pakistani drama which aired on Hum TV in 2012. It is the story of how the lives of two sisters, Mehar Bano and Shah Bano, change after the death of their parents. It was directed by Fahim Burney and written by Seema Ghazal.

== Plot ==
In a grand haveli, Mehar Bano's life is turned upside down when her childhood fiancé, Nasir, disappears on the eve of their wedding. As her family struggles to cope, her brother's deceitful plan to sell the haveli without their knowledge brings in Faraz, a charming stranger who becomes an unlikely guest. As Shah Bano falls for Faraz's charms, Mehar Bano finds herself inexplicably drawn to him too. Faraz's heart also beats for Mehar, who's still reeling from Nasir's betrayal. As the family's world crumbles, the sisters are forced to flee the haveli, and Mehar must confront her past when she encounters Nasir, who's returned a changed man. Will Mehar's heart forgive Nasir's past abandonment, or will she find love and redemption with Faraz, the man who unwittingly walked into their lives?

== Cast ==
- Mahnoor Baloch as Mehar Bano, the older sister.
- Sara Loren as Shah Bano, the younger sister who falls for Faraz.
- Nauman Ijaz as Faraz, who falls in love with Mehar Bano.
- Adnan Siddiqui as Nasir, Mehar Bano's fiancé.
- Azfar Rehman as the brother of the two sisters.
- Benita David
- Farhan Ali Agha as Hashim, Rano's husband and Haris' father
- Nazli Nasr as Rano Aapi. Her son, Haris provides shelter to Shah Bano.
- Hira Tareen
- Maheen Rizvi
- Farah Nadir
- Ahmed Zeb
- Shaz Khan
- Atif Rathor
- Farooq Zameer
- Afaq Chaudhry
- Parveen Malik
- Afzal Latifi
- Sidra Sajid
