= Faisal Rehman =

Pakistani actor

- فیصل رحمان
- Born: Faisal Rehman; 17 October 1966 (age 59); Lahore, Punjab, Pakistan
- Occupations: Actor; Director; Screenwriter
- Years active: 1980–1991, 1997–present
- Relatives: Rehman (paternal uncle); Fasih Ur Rehman (brother)

Faisal Rehman, commonly known as Faisal, is a Pakistani actor, screenwriter and director.

He has worked in both films and television.

== Early life and education ==
Faisal Rehman's ancestors hail from Afghanistan with roots in the Mohammadzai clan of Kabul belonging to Barakzai branch of the Durrani confederacy, tracing their roots to Ahmad Shah Abdali. His ancestors moved to India in 1905 during British Raj. His father Massud-ur-Rehman was a cinematographer and younger brother of noted Bollywood actor Rehman, while Faisal's brother Fasih Ur Rehman is a classical dancer.

Faisal did his secondary schooling at St. Anthony High School, Lahore.

== Career ==
=== Actor ===
He was only 14 when he landed his first role in Nazar-ul-Islam's 1980 film Nahi Abhi Nahi, also starring famous film actress Shabnam.

He has acted in movies in the 1980s and mostly in television from the 1990s onward; he has called Khalil-ur-Rehman Qamar' s Chandpur Ka Chandoo (1999) his favorite acting role on TV.

He is one of the founding members of "The Actors' Collective (ACT)", an association of actors, including film, theatre and televisions artists, in Pakistan, established in 2009 and based in Lahore.

=== Director and screenwriter ===
He has directed and written numerous telefilms and short films, including World Ka Centre (2002), a portrayal of lower middle-class life in Lahore and young men intending to move to the United States, and which won the Special Jury Award at the 2002 Kara Film Festival.

== Filmography ==
=== Films ===
Year	Movie	Note
1980	Nahin Abhi Nahin	Film debut
1981	Aladdin	
1981	Ye Zamana Aur Hay	
1982	Biwi Ho To Aisee	
1983	Nadani	Joint Pakistan-Bangladesh production
1983	Tina	
1984	Love Story	
1984	Miss Colombo	
1984	Doorian	
1985	Aaposh	Bangladeshi movie
1985	Naraaz	
1985	Mehak	
1985	Jeene Nahin Doonge	
1985	Qasam Munnay Ki	
1985	Palkon Ki Chaaon Mein	
1986	Dhanak	
1986	Miss Singapore	
1986	Beqarar	Remade in 2017 as Chain Aye Na
1986	Baat Baan Jay	
1987	Girebaan	
1988	Chakkar	
1988	Bazar-e-Husn	
1990	Bulandi	
1991	Aandhi	
1991	Piyaar Aur Pasa	
1995	Khotay Sikkay	Film in both Punjabi and Urdu
1999	Ghadaar	
1999	Da Pakhtun Leone	Film in Pashto
1999	Guns and Roses - Ik Junoon	
2014	Kanebaaz	
2014	Bawanshah	

=== Television ===
Telefilms
Year	Title	Role	Director	Screenwriter	Channel and additional notes
1999	Amma Abba Aur Ali				
1999	Laal Baig	Doctor Sahab			
2002	Kaali Shalwar		Yes	Yes	Indus TV, adaptation of Saadat Hasan Manto
2004	Javaid Shampoo		Yes	Yes	Screened at the 4th Kara Film Festival received Ciepie for Special Jurors' Selection
2007	Manay Na Yeh Dill				Hum TV
2009	Home		Yes	Yes	Hum TV
Serials
Year	Title	Role	Director	Screenwriter	Channel and additional notes
1997	Shahpar	Flt Lt Hassan			PAF Drama
1998	Ghulam Gardish	Naveed			PTV
1999	Chandpur Ka Chandoo				PTV
1999	Bulandi	Ali			PTV
2000	Aur Zindagi Badalti Hai	Shehryar			PTV
2002	Sarmaya				Indus Vision
2005	Sussar In Law				PTV
2007	Maanay Na Ye Dil				Hum TV
2007	Qissa-e-Ulfat	Himself			Mini-series on Aaj TV. Rehman played a novel reader along with Jia Ali.
2009	Malaal	Danish			Hum TV
2009	Butter Flies	Faisal			Hum TV
2009	Aik Lamha Chahiye	Ahmar			ATV
2009	Deewangi	Umar			ARY Digital
2010	Khamoshiyan	Arham			Hum TV
2010	Vasl	Salman			Hum TV
2010	Chemistry	Professor Waqar			Geo TV
2010	Aye Ishq Hamein Barbaad Na Kar	Imran			ARY Digital
2010	Saans				ARY Digital
2011	Badtameez	Javed Hayatt			ARY Digital
2012	Zard Mausam	Waqar ul Hasan			Hum TV
2012	Coke Kahani	Mir Asfand Jehangir			Hum TV, PTV, Urdu 1
2012	Dagh-i-Nadamat				PTV
2012	Sitamgar	Zohaib			Hum TV
2013–2014	Ranjish Hi Sahi	Kamal Hassan			Geo TV
2015	Pardes	Makhdoom Shah			Hum Sitaray
2015–2016	Tere Baghair	Wasi			Hum TV
2016	Izn-e-Rukhsat	Ehtishaam			Geo Entertainment
2017	Gumrah	Sarmad			Hum TV
2018	Kaisi Aurat Houn Main	Moiz			Hum TV
2018	Aatish	Sameer			Hum TV
2018	Kahan Ho Tum	Ubaid			A-Plus TV
2019	Wafa Lazim To Nahin	Fateh			TV One
2024	Qarz e Jaan	Asim			Hum TV
2025	Khwabon Mein Mili	Ballay			Hum TV

== Awards and nominations ==
Year	Ceremony	Category	Project	Result
1980	Nigar Awards	Special Award	Nahin Abhi Nahin	Won
2002	Kara Film Festival	Special Jury Award	World Ka Centre	Won
2003	Indus Telefilm Festival	Best TV Film and Director	World Ka Centre	Won
2003	2nd Lux Style Awards	Best TV Actor	Sarmaya	Nominated
2005	1st Indus Drama Awards	Best Actor Serial	Azal	Won
2006	5th Lux Style Awards	Best TV Actor (Terrestrial)	Batain Dil Ki	Nominated
2009	8th Lux Style Awards	Best TV Actor (Satellite)	Khamoshiyan	Nominated
2012	17th PTV Awards	Best Supporting Actor	Phir Bi Na Janay	Nominated
2013	1st Hum Awards	Best Actor	Zard Mausam	Nominated
2014	13th Lux Style Awards	Best TV Actor (Terrestrial)	Daag-e-Nadamat	Nominated

== See also ==
- Ismael Shah, the first dancing hero of Pakistan
