= Yaar Baash =

- Directed by: Liaqat Ali Khan
- Written by: Qadar Khan
- Produced by: Nadir Khan
- Starring: Ajab Gul; Jahangir khan jani (Jani); Alisha; Asima; Nadir Ali Khan
- Cinematography: Haji Parvez Zargar
- Music by: Jalal Sarhadi
- Release date: 2006
- Country: Pakistan
- Language: Pashto

Yaar Baash is a 2006 Pakistani film, and writer is Qadir Khan. In 2006, Mazhar Movies ranked the movie amongst the Top 25 Must See Pollywood Films.

== Cast ==
- Ajab Gul
- Jahangir khan jani
- Alisha
- Asima
- Nadir Ali Khan
