= Ashraf Khan (actor) =

Pakistani comic actor

- اشرف خان
- Born: Lahore, Punjab, Pakistan
- Occupations: Comedian, actor
- Years active: 1960-present
- Known for: Fifty Fifty
- Television: PTV

Ashraf Khan is a Pakistani comic actor who has been working on radio, stage, and television since the 1960s. He is best known for his comedy characters in the TV serial Fifty Fifty (1978 – 1984).

== Life and career ==
Born in Lahore, he started his career at Radio Pakistan Lahore, as a child artist in the mid-1960s. There he found Mirza Sultan Baig as his mentor. He moved to Karachi in the early 1970s. His debut drama at PTV Karachi center was Uncle Urfi (1972). The real breakthrough for him came when he joined the team of the TV comedy show Fifty Fifty, which was aired from 1978 to 1984. His self-created spoofs of famous film songs were a popular part of the show. After Fifty Fifty, he worked in a number of TV plays. Some of his notable dramas include Janjal Pura (1996), Family Front (1997), Double Sawaari (2006), Bulbulay (2009), Dugdugi (2011), and Halla Gulla (2015).

== Filmography ==
=== Television series ===
Year	Drama	Role	Network	Notes
1972	Uncle Urfi	Police Inspector	PTV	Debut drama
1977	Intezar Framaiay	Manager	PTV	
1978	Fifty Fifty	Different roles.	PTV	Sketch comedy
1985	Excuse Me	Different roles.	PTV	Comedy drama
1989	Jangloos	Police officer	PTV	
1993	Fareb	Sheru	PTV	
1994	Naya Qanoon	Mangu Kochwan	PTV	Long-Play
1994	Paharon Ki Barf	Meeray	PTV	Long-Play
1995	Mitti Di Khushbu	Chauhdry	PTV	Punjabi drama
1995	Red Card	Siddiqui	PTV	
1995	Dastak Aur Darwaza	Rungi	PTV	
1996	Janjal Pura	Kareem Bakhsh	PTV	Comedy drama
1997	Akkhar	A.G	PTV	Punjabi drama
1997	Family Front	Doctor Qubool	PTV	Sitcom
1999	Comedy Theater	Different roles.	PTV	Anthology series
2000	Justju	Beeta	PTV	Science fiction
2002	Thori Khushi Thora Ghum	Jimmy	PTV	
2004	Maa	Joginder	PTV	
2006	Gharoor	Ditta	PTV	
2006	Double Sawaari	Kamaalla	PTV	Comedy drama
2009	Gharana Fasana	Shamshad Ahmad	Geo Entertainment	Comedy drama
2009	Muhabbat Yun Bhi Hoti Hai	Hayat Ahmad	A-Plus TV	
2009	Bulbulay	Mustqeem	ARY Digital	Sitcom
2011	Dugdugi	Ashraf	ARY Digital	Sitcom
2011	Afsar Bekaar e Khas	Shafi	PTV	Comedy drama
2011	Chahat	Maama	PTV	
2016	Total Siyapaa	Sami Ullah	ARY Digital	Telefilm
2018	Dil Pe Mat Le Yar	Basharat	ARY Digital	Comedy drama
2019	Apni Jannat	Butt	Inner Pakistan	Short drama
2019	Happy Marriage	Malik Mukhtar Nai		Comedy drama
2022	Ye Laga Sixer	Rasheed	Play Entertainment	Comedy drama
2022	Chaudhry and Sons	Ramzan	Geo Entertainment	Comedy drama
2022	Aap Ka Khadam	Taya	PTV	Comedy drama

=== Films ===
- Halla Gulla (2015)
