= Anjuman (2013 film) =

Pakistani TV series

- Theme Image
- Based on: Anjuman (film) by Safdar Masud
- Directed by: Yasir Nawaz
- Starring: Imran Abbas Naqvi; Sara Loren; Iffat Rahim; Alyy Khan; Sohai Ali Abro; Farah Nadir
- Country of origin: Pakistan
- Original language: Urdu

Production
- Producer: Tarang Housefull
- Editor: Wajahatullah Khan
- Running time: 110 minutes
- Production company: Mastermind

Original release
- Release: 2013

Anjuman is a Pakistani romantic drama telefilm directed by Yasir Nawaz. It is a remake of the 1970 film of the same name, starring Waheed Murad and Rani. The telefilm was produced by Tarang Housefull and stars Imran Abbas Naqvi, Sara Loren, Iffat Rahim, Alyy Khan and Sohai Ali Abro. It was written by Zanjabeel Asim Shah.

In 2013, Anjuman was nominated in four categories at the Tarang Housefull Awards and won three of these.

== Plot ==
The film is a tragedy based on a tawaif 'Anjuman', who was born to a rich noble father and a tawaif mother. After her father's death she and her mother were abandoned by her paternal family. Her mother becomes a tawaif to earn a living and wishes that one day her daughter will join the same profession. Anjuman hides her identity and tries to overcome her situation by pursuing higher education. She joins university with her family's given name of "Anjum Hayat Khan" and leads a respectable life. She always dreams of leave "kotha" after her graduation. At the University, she falls in love with Asif, a classmate of noble birth. Asif is already engaged to be married to his cousin. One day, some university boys along with Asif, learn of Anjuman's family background during a dance show and they reveal her reality in front of the whole university. Anjuman leaves the university out of humiliation and decides to join her mother's dark profession.

A wealthy man, Wajahat, comes into her life as a client and turns out to be the elder brother of Asif. In order to save his elder brother's marriage, Asif decides to visit Anjuman's "kotha" in an "exchange" demanded by Anjuman. Asif initially hates Anjuman but later develops affection for her when he learns that because of him, Anjuman had to quit her studies and join this profession. At the end, Asif reveals everything to his family and decides to marry Anjuman to save her pride and give her a socially respectable life.

== Cast ==
- Imran Abbas Naqvi as Asif Ali
- Sara Loren as Anjum Hayat Khan
- Alyy Khan as Wajahat Ali
- Iffat Rahim as Zarine "Zerri" Wajahat
- Sohai Ali Abro as Mariam
- Farah Nadir as Anjum's mother

== Soundtrack ==
Anjuman

Soundtrack album by Sunidhi Chauhan
- Length: 37:45
- Language: Urdu
- Director: Yasir Nawaz

Anjuman songs are sung by Sunidhi Chauhan, composed by Erphan Qayyum.

Track listing
| No. | Title | Singer(s) | Length |
|---|---|---|---|
| 1. | "Aap Dil Ki Anjuman Mein" | Sunidhi Chauhan | 5:23 |
| 2. | "Dil Dharke Main Tum Se" | Sunidhi Chauhan | 5:38 |

=== Awards ===
| year | Award | Category | Recipient(s) | Result |
|---|---|---|---|---|
| 2013 | Tarang Housefull Awards | Best Telefilm | Yasir Nawaz | Won |
| 2013 | Tarang Housefull Awards | Best Actress in a Leading Role | Sara Loren | Won |
| 2013 | Tarang Housefull Awards | Best Writer | Zanjabeel Asim Shah | Won |
| 2013 | Tarang Housefull Awards | Best Song | "Dil Dharke Main Tum Se" | Won |
| 2013 | Tarang Housefull Awards | Best Song | "Aap Dil Ki Anjuman Mein" | Nominated |
| 2013 | Tarang Housefull Awards | Best Actor in a Leading Role | Imran Abbas Naqvi | Nominated |
| 2013 | Tarang Housefull Awards | Best Supporting Actor (Male) | Alyy Khan | Nominated |
| 2013 | Tarang Housefull Awards | Best Supporting Actor (Female) | Iffat Rahim | Nominated |
