= Indonesian Broadcasting Commission =

- Komisi Penyiaran Indonesia
- Logo of KPI

Agency overview
- Formed: 2002; 24 years ago
- Jurisdiction: Indonesia
- Headquarters: Jl. Djuanda No. 36, Jakarta, Indonesia
- Agency executive: Agung Suprio, Chairman
- Website: kpi.go.id

The Indonesian Broadcasting Commission (Indonesian: Komisi Penyiaran Indonesia, abbreviated as KPI) is an independent broadcasting agency in Indonesia that functions as a regulating body for broadcasting companies in the country. The commission was established in 2002 based on Act No. 32 of 2002 on Broadcasting. KPI consists of the Central Indonesian Broadcasting Commission (KPI Pusat) and the Regional Indonesian Broadcasting Commission (KPID) who work on the provincial level.

== Formation ==
The predecessor of today's KPI was the National Broadcasting Advisory and Controlling Agency (Badan Pertimbangan dan Pengendalian Penyiaran Nasional, or BP3N), mandated upon the provision of Act No. 24 of 1997 on Broadcasting, but it did not came into formation.

The succeeding Act No. 32 of 2002 on Broadcasting is the main basis for the establishment of the KPI. The broadcasting system is managed by an independent body free from any influence of the financiers, powerful people, and political institutions such as the government. In comparison, Section 7 of the former Act No. 24 of 1997 on Broadcasting states that "broadcasting is dominated by the country's structure and operations are undertaken by the government", indicating that the broadcasting agency was subject to the government of Indonesia.

Indonesia's democratization process puts the public as both owner and controller of the broadcasting sphere industry. This is because the frequencies are public property and limited in nature; their use should be for the greater public interest. This means that the media broadcasting services must perform the function of provision of information for public health. The information is varied, ranging from news, entertainment, science, etc. The healthy function of information services, as set out in Act No. 32 of 2002, is based on the principles of diversity of ownership and diversity of content.

== Notable cases ==
- In September 2014, five animated series, namely Tom and Jerry, SpongeBob SquarePants, Crayon Shinchan, Little Krishna, and Bima Sakti (Indonesian name of Chhota Bheem) which air on RCTI, Global TV (now GTV), and ANTV, were reprimanded by KPI after being considered to contain violence, pornography, and material unsuitable for children.
- In December 2018, KPI banned a Shopee advertisement featuring South Korean girl group Blackpink due to the members' revealing outfits.
- In September 2019, the Rabbids Invasion segments of the SpongeBob SquarePants show airing on GTV were reprimanded by KPI for containing violent scenes. However, this caused public outcry and was somewhat inaccurate.
- In late January 2021, KPI imposed sanctions on ANTV after airing foreign shows exceeding the limit of 40% in a day.
- In February 2021, KPI took down a Starmaker advertisement after featuring a man with womanlike appearance.
- In March 2024, SauRans ceased to air after KPI warned it due to rating classification issues.

== Controversy ==
In September 2021, one of KPI employees filed a criminal case regarding sexual abuse he had received, which lasted from 2012.

KPI is also known to possess a questionable morality when it comes to censorship of television. KPI's censorship aspect that has been more emphasized so far in monitoring broadcasts is "morality", which is less clear (abstract) and tends to be cliché; this makes the public tend to view KPI in a negative light. For example, while focusing on enforcing the prohibition on "men dressed in feminine attire", on the other hand, the KPI also banned 42 songs deemed to contain offensive language. The KPI also stumbled upon a sexual harassment case in its institution and seemed to turn a blind eye when the artist who sexually harassed Saiful Jamil was shown on television. The censorship done by KPI is also nonsensically selective, such as censoring SpongeBob SquarePants while "not giving a damn" to uneducative Indonesian soap operas. KPI also overstepped their authority, such as overcensoring and overbluring (especially in anime, swimming events, or even foreign films).

== Awards ==
The KPI organize Indonesian Broadcasting Commission Awards (Anugerah KPI), which is held every year since 2006.
