= Ashir Azeem =

Pakistani-Canadian media personality

- عاشر عظیم
- Born: 1962 (age 63–64); Quetta, Balochistan, Pakistan
- Education: Institute of Business Administration, Karachi
- Occupations: Actor; Film Director; Film Producer; Film Writer; Truck Driver
- Years active: 1993–1994; 2015–present
- Employer: Federal Board of Revenue
- Spouse: Bushra Ashir Azeem
- Children: 2
- Website: Maalik

Ashir Azeem Gill (Urdu: عاشر عظیم) is a Pakistani-Canadian film and television director, actor, writer and former civil services officer who rose to fame through television series Dhuwan in 1994. He now hosts a political reform based web-series on his YouTube channel.

== Early life and career ==
Ashir Azeem was born in Quetta in 1962 where he attended early schooling. He attended the Pakistan Air Force College of Aeronautical Engineering from 1981 to 1984. Later, he received a degree in BBA from Institute of Business Administration, Karachi in 1984–1986. In 1988, Ashir joined Central Superior Services of Pakistan through "16th Common". While working there, he wrote a story about the Pakistan Armed Forces. Later, one of his colleagues advised him to create a television serial on his story. The serial titled Dhuwan based on his story was aired on Pakistan Television Corporation (now PTV Home) in 1994. He appeared in the serial as the lead actor and gained public recognition. Dhuwan became popular all over the country and received positive response. Ashir then moved to Canada in 2016. In 2015, he announced his debut film Maalik which he wrote in 1993. The film was directed, written and co-produced by Ashir. It was released on 8 April 2016. Ashir also acted in Hassan Rana's film Yalghaar.

=== Civil Service ===
In addition to his media work, Ashir Azeem was a Pakistani civil servant. He served in the civil service Federal Board of Revenue by being assiduous and honest. He worked tirelessly to improve Pakistan's economy and took steps by staying in Pakistan Customs and coordinating with CBR and other departments. During his service at Pakistan Customs, in order for Pakistan's industry to proliferate rapidly, he developed a software based on a system that cleared containers in 4 hours where previously it used to be cleared in 12 days. The project developed by Ashir and his colleagues was on par with developed countries like Australia and the United States. Due to this software, Pakistan Customs Department was moving towards transparency. But corrupted individuals after seeing a loss of their interests suspended Ashir from office by making baseless and false allegations. Here, he set a great example of the country's love and did not hold any press conference, did not resort to any propaganda. He quietly fought for his rights in the court for three years. Three years later, the court acquitted him and ordered to be reinstated in the post and dismissed all the allegations as false. However, he resigned from his post and migrated with his family from Pakistan to Canada. Now he is a truck driver in Canada and expresses his views in the love of Pakistan through his video message on YouTube. Every video contains tips for the development of Pakistan and a hopeful message for the youth.

== Personal life ==
He is married to Bushra Ashir Azeem, has two children and is a dual Pakistani-Canadian citizen. He is a Roman Catholic Christian.

On 7 July 2017, through his Twitter account, Azeem revealed that he currently drives a 22-wheeler truck in Canada as his main source of income. He also has a YouTube channel in which he discusses his views about governance, political, and societal issues of Pakistan.

== Filmography ==
No.	Film	Role	Year	Notes
1.	Maalik	Major Asad	2016	director, producer, writer
2.	Yalghaar	Maj. Gen. Ahmed	2017	Cameo role as an infantry general

=== Television ===
No.	Serial	Role	Year	Notes
1.	Dhuwan	Azhar	1994	writer
