= List of Asian television awards =

This list of Asian television awards is an index to articles on notable awards for contributions in various fields of television in Asia. The list is organized by region and country, although some awards are open to television performers or shows from more than one country.

== General ==
Award	Sponsor	Notes
Asia Contents Awards & Global OTT Awards	Ministry of Science and ICT and Busan Metropolitan City	The achievements of excellent content made for TV, OTT, and online across Asia
Asia Artist Awards	South Korean newspaper Money Today	Since 2016. For achievements of Asian artists in television, film and music.
Asia Rainbow TV Awards	Hong Kong Television Association and China Television Production Committee	Since 2011. Asian television awards ceremony.
Asian Academy Creative Awards	Singaporean Media Company Mediacorp	The annual Asian Academy Creative Awards are presented every December as part of the Singapore Media Festival.
Asian Television Awards	Sarawak State Government, Malaysia	Since 1995. To recognize and reward programming and production excellence in the Asian television industry.
Asian Viewers Television Awards	Digi Media Global	Since 2014. Annual award show event held in London which honors the best of Asian Television.

== East Asia ==
Country	Award	Sponsor	Notes
China	China TV Drama Awards	Anhui Television	For excellence in television in China.
China	China TV Golden Eagle Award	China Television Artists Association	On alternate years with the Flying Apsaras Awards.
China	Chunyan Awards	Beijing Government etc.	Biennial in Beijing since 1991 for exceptional achievement in Chinese film and television series.
China	Flying Apsaras Awards	National Radio and Television Administration	Biennial awards ceremony for excellent achievement in Chinese television.
China	Huading Awards	Tianxia Yingcai Cultural Media in Beijing	Presented since 2007 for entertainment media from Chinese television shows to international films and music.
China	Golden Lotus Awards	Macau International Television Festival	Held in conjunction with the Macau International Movie Festival.
China	Magnolia Awards	Shanghai Television Festival	International television festival
China	Gold Panda Awards	Sichuan Television Festival	Held since 1991, bi-annual, features miniseries, made-for-TV movies and TV series.
China	The Actors of China Awards	China Television Artists Association	Presented annually since 2014
Hong Kong	TVB Anniversary Awards	TVB	See also TVB Awards Winners Lists
Japan	Elan d'or Awards	All Nippon Producers Association	Outstanding achievements in domestic motion pictures and television.
Japan	Galaxy Award (Japan)	Japan Council for Better Radio and television	Television programs, radio programs, television commercials, and news programming
Japan	Golden Arrow Award	Japan Magazine Publishers Association	Excellence in domestic media, such as in film, television, and music
Japan	International Drama Festival in Tokyo	Japan Commercial Broadcasters Association	Excellence in television drama production
Japan	Nikkan Sports Drama Grand Prix	Nikkan Sports newspaper	Japanese television dramas.
South Korea	APAN Star Awards	Korea Entertainment Management Association	Excellence in television in South Korea
South Korea	Asia Artist Awards	Money Today, StarNews and MTN	Outstanding achievements and international contributions of Asian artists in television, film and music
South Korea	Asia Contents Awards & Global OTT Awards	Ministry of Science and ICT and Busan Metropolitan City	The achievements of excellent content made for TV, OTT, and online across Asia
South Korea	Baeksang Arts Awards	Ilgan Sports and JTBC Plus	For excellence in film, television and theatre
South Korea	Blue Dragon Film Awards	Sports Chosun	For excellence in cinematic achievements in South Korea.
South Korea	Blue Dragon Series Awards	Sports Chosun	Excellence in streaming television and OTT in South Korea.
South Korea	Grimae Awards	Korean Television Producers Association	Best in Drama, Documentary, TV Commercial and Variety Show
South Korea	KBS Drama Awards	Korean Broadcasting System	Outstanding achievements in Korean dramas aired on the KBS network
South Korea	KBS Entertainment Awards	Korean Broadcasting System	Excellence in variety entertainment
South Korea	Korea Drama Awards	Korea Drama Festival	Excellence in television in South Korea The eligibility period is October of the previous year to September of the current year. Nominees are chosen from Korean dramas that aired on the three major broadcasting networks (KBS, MBC and SBS) and cable channels.
South Korea	Korean Popular Culture and Arts Awards	Korea Creative Content Agency	Contributions to pop culture and the arts
South Korea	MBC Drama Awards	Munhwa Broadcasting Corporation	Outstanding achievements in Korean dramas aired on the MBC network The process has been widely criticized.
South Korea	MBC Entertainment Awards	Munhwa Broadcasting Corporation	Excellence in variety entertainment
South Korea	SBS Drama Awards	Seoul Broadcasting System	Drama
South Korea	SBS Entertainment Awards	Seoul Broadcasting System	Excellence in variety entertainment
South Korea	Seoul International Drama Awards	Korean Broadcasters Association	Excellence in television drama productions worldwide.
South Korea	The Grand Bell Awards	The Motion Pictures Association of Korea	excellence in cinematic achievements. Also known as the Korean equivalent of the American Academy Awards.
South Korea	The Seoul Awards	Sports Seoul	Outstanding achievements in film and television
South Korea	tvN10 Awards	TVN (South Korean TV channel)	Excellence in television in South Korea (only reserved for tvN's programs)
Taiwan	Golden Bell Awards	Bureau of Audiovisual and Music Industry Development	Television production award
Taiwan	Sanlih Drama Awards	Sanlih E-Television	Best in SETTV drama programming.

== South Asia ==
Country	Award	Sponsor	Notes	Ref
India	Asianet Television Awards	Asianet	Excellence in Malayalam cinema & Television	
India	Big FM Tamil Entertainment Awards	Reliance Communications	Tamil industry awards	
India	BIG Star Entertainment Awards	Reliance Broadcast Network	Indian cinema, music, television, sports, theatre and dance awards	
India	Colors Kannada Anubandha Awards	Colors Kannada	Cast and crew of the television serials which air on Colors Kannada	
India	Colors Marathi Awards	Colors Marathi	Cast and crew of the television serials which air on Colors Marathi	
India	FICCI Frames Excellence Awards	Federation of Indian Chambers of Commerce & Industry	Excellence in Film and TV Industry	
India	Gold Awards	White Leaf Entertainment	Best performers in the Hindi-language television industry	
India	Iconic Gold Awards	Indian Television	Best Hindi television, film, and web-series performances	
India	Indian Television Academy Awards	Indian Television Academy	Excellence in Hindi Television	
India	Indian Telly Awards	Indian Television	Best Hindi television performances	
India	IReel Awards	Network18 Group	Excellence of Indian web series	
India	Lions Gold Awards	Lions Clubs International	Excellence in Indian Film and Television Industry	
India	Nandi Awards	Government of Andhra Pradesh	Excellence in Telugu-language Television Industry	
India	Nickelodeon Kids' Choice Awards India	Viacom 18	Indian Film, TV, Music and Sports	
India	People's Choice Awards India	Colors TV	Movies, TV, Music and Sports	
India	Producers Guild Film Awards	Apsara Producers Guild	Excellence in Indian film and television	
India	Sun Kudumbam Viruthugal	Sun TV	Cast and crew of the television serials which air on Sun TV	
India	Star Parivaar Awards	StarPlus	Excellence in characters portrayed by actors in the shows of Star Plus	
India	Star Jalsha Parivar Awards	Star Jalsha	Excellence in characters portrayed by actors in the shows of Star Jalsha	
India	Star Pravah Parivar Awards	Star Pravah	Excellence in characters portrayed by actors in the shows of Star Pravah	
India	Star Maa Parivaar Awards	Star Maa	Excellence in characters portrayed by actors in the shows of Star Maa	
India	Vijay Television Awards	Star Vijay	Excellence in characters portrayed by actors in the shows of Star Vijay	
India	Zee Kannada Kutumba Awards	Zee Kannada	For excellence in drama achievements by the actors of serials on Zee Kannada	
India	Zee Marathi Utsav Natyancha Awards	Zee Marathi	For excellence in drama achievements by the actors of serials on Zee Marathi	
India	Zee Rishtey Awards	Zee TV	For excellence in drama achievements by the actors of serials on Zee TV	
India	Zee Bangla Sonar Sansar Awards	Zee Bangla	For excellence in drama achievements by the actors of the serial on Zee Bangla	
India	Zee Tamil Kudumbam Viruthugal	Zee Tamil	For excellence in drama achievements by the actors of serials on Zee Tamil	
India	Zee Telugu Kutumbam Awards	Zee Telugu	For excellence in drama achievements by the actors of serials on Zee Telugu	
Pakistan	Hum Awards	Hum Network	Excellence in programming of television, fashion and music industry of Pakistan	
Pakistan	Indus Telefilm Festival	Indus TV	Television film awards	
Pakistan	Lux Style Awards	Lux (soap), Unilever	Excellence in media achievements	
Pakistan	Pakistan Media Awards	PMA	Radio, TV, film and theatre achievements	
Pakistan	PTV Awards	Pakistan Television Corporation	Excellence in television, fashion, movie and music achievements	
Sri Lanka	Raigam Tele'es	Kingdom of Raigam	Distinguished individuals involved with the Sri Lanka's television screen	
Sri Lanka	Sumathi Awards	Sumathi Group	Excellence in television program achievements	

== Southeast Asia ==
Country	Award	Sponsor	Notes
Indonesia	Dahsyatnya Awards	RCTI	Best achievement in the entertainment industry
Indonesia	Indonesian Broadcasting Commission Awards	Indonesian Broadcasting Commission	Outstanding achievement in the Indonesian broadcasting industry based on quality
Indonesia	Indonesian Choice Awards	NET.	Outstanding achievement in the Indonesian entertainment industry
Indonesia	Indonesian Television Awards	Media Nusantara Citra	Television programs and performances in Indonesia based on a people's choice poll
Indonesia	Nickelodeon Indonesia Kids' Choice Awards	Nickelodeon	Biggest television, movie, and music acts as voted by viewers of Nickelodeon networks
Indonesia	Panasonic Gobel Awards	Panasonic, Gobel Group	Television programs and performances in Indonesia based on a people's choice poll
Indonesia	SCTV Awards	SCTV	Rapidly growing Indonesian television artists on SCTV
Malaysia	Golden Awards	NTV7	Excellence in the production and performance of Malaysian Chinese television
Philippines	ASAP Pop Viewers' Choice Awards	ABS-CBN	Year's biggest television, movie, and music acts, as voted by Kapamilya fans.
Philippines	Box Office Entertainment Awards	Guillermo Mendoza Memorial Scholarship Foundation	Honors stars and performers simply for their popularity and commercial success in the Philippine entertainment industry
Philippines	Golden Screen TV Awards	Entertainment Press Society	Outstanding programs and personalities from different TV networks in the Philippines including ABS-CBN, TV5, GMA Network, among others.
Philippines	Nickelodeon Philippines Kids' Choice Awards	Nickelodeon	Biggest TV and sports personalities voted by kids and teenagers
Philippines	PMPC Star Awards for Television	Philippine Movie Press Club	Outstanding programming produced by the several TV networks in the Philippines
Singapore	Pradhana Vizha	MediaCorp Vasantham	Rapidly growing Tamil television artists on Mediacorp Vasantham
Singapore	Star Awards	Mediacorp	Outstanding Mediacorp performances of the year
Singapore	Star Awards for Best Director	Mediacorp	Best Director of Mediacorp drama serial
Singapore	StarHub TVB Awards	StarHub, VV Drama, E City	Achievements by Hong Kong television dramas and artists in Singapore
Thailand	Golden Television Awards	Television Promotion Club	Outstanding work on Thai television
Thailand	Kom Chad Luek Award	Kom Chad Luek newspaper	Individuals in the Thai entertainment industry
Thailand	Maya Awards	Maya Channel Magazine	People in the Thai entertainment industry and their achievements in the music, film, television and drama
Vietnam	HTV Awards	Ho Chi Minh City Television (HTV)	Outstanding HTV performances of the year
Vietnam	Kite Awards	Vietnam Cinema Association	Outstanding achievement for Vietnamese feature and television film
Vietnam	National Television Festival	Vietnam Television	Outstanding achievement for Vietnamese television industry
Vietnam	VTV Awards	Vietnam Television	Outstanding VTV performances of the year

== Western Asia ==
Country	Award	Sponsor	Notes
Turkey	Golden Butterfly Award	Hürriyet newspaper	Readers vote for nominees in the fields of Turkish television and music.

== See also ==
- List of television awards
