= Nighat Chaudhry =

Pakistani actress

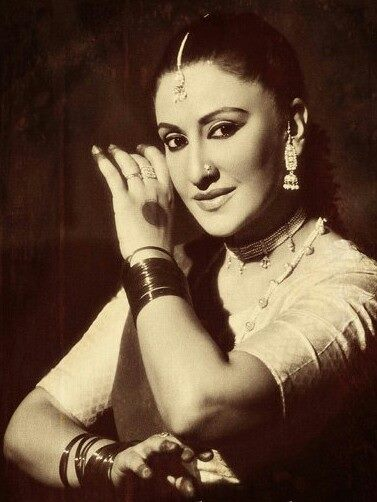
- Born: February 24, 1962 (age 64); Lahore, Pakistan
- Occupation: Kathak classical dancer
- Years active: 1985–present
- Awards: Pride of Performance Award in 2018 by the President of Pakistan
- Website: www.nighatchaodhry.com

Nighat Chaudhry (Urdu: نگہت چودھری) is a Kathak classical dancer who was born on 24 February 1954, in Lahore, Pakistan. She moved to London with her parents when she was one year old. She studied ballet and contemporary dance; but when she was 14, she met Nahid Siddiqui, one of the greatest Kathak dancers, and began training with her. Inspired to learn the classical forms of her own culture, she abandoned ballet. In order to understand and absorb the nuances of the Indian style, she wished to be closer to its origins; and she moved back to Pakistan. She eventually became a trained Sufi & Mystique Kathak classical dancer and has been active as a professional Kathak dancer for over three decades.

== Early life and education ==
=== Personal life ===
She belongs to a literary family on her father's side and to the business world on her mother's side. Her grandfather from her maternal side owned a renowned business by the name of Chaudhry Hosiery Mills before partition in Dacca, Ludhiana, Lahore, and Faisalabad, while her father Abdur-Rehman Chaudhry was a professor who taught mathematics at the University of Agriculture Faisalabad, eventually moving on to becoming a professor at Government College University.

Her brother, Farooq Chaudhry, graduated with a bachelor's in Dance Performance from The Place (Sadler's Wells Theatre), in London, and performed as an international professional dancer in the eighties and nineties. He received an Asian Achievement Award for his work as a performer in 1988. In 1999, he retired from dancing and completed an MA in Arts Management from the City University of London. In 2000, Farooq Chaudhry co-founded the Akram Khan company, with Akram Khan (dancer), and became the company producer. He has had leadership roles as a producer for the English National Ballet in October 2013, and as an international executive director for China's National Dance icon Yang Liping since 2016.

=== Education ===
She completed her formal education in London, where she completed O- and A-levels, and received certification from a Dance Foundation Course at the Laban Centre for Movement and Dance, Goldsmiths College, London. She acquired a master's degree in professional practice in dance technique pedagogy from Middlesex University London and a Certified Skill Diploma In Choreography from Jain University in Bangalore.

=== Kathak training and courses ===
- Certificate in Classical Ballet and Creative Dance at Fulham Gilliatt and Rambert, London. 1970-76
- Classical Kathak Dance training under Nahid Siddiqui, London. 1977-83
- Classical Kathak Dance training under Maharaj Ghulam Hussain Kathak, Lahore. 1983-87
- Trained with two advanced intensive workshops at Kumudini Lakhia, London. 1981/91
- Advanced classical Kathak training under Pandit Durga Lal and Uma Durga at Kathak Kendra, Delhi. 1988-92
- Summer intensive Kathak Workshop at Bharatiya Vidya Bhavan Educational Trust with Saswati Sen, the senior-most disciple of Pandit Birju Maharaj. 2015
- Completed Grade-3 certificate under Pali Chandra Gurukul, the renowned Kathak Guru, Dubai. 2016

== Career ==
=== Professional history ===
In 1985, Chaudhry became an air hostess with British Airways (Karachi Base). In 1996, she was appointed as a lead kathak dancer in Nahid Siddiqui's Dance Company London. In 2001, she started working as a director of the Pakistan National Council of the Arts (PNCA). In 2010, she created a dance syllabus and taught as a performing arts dance instructor at Lahore Grammar School. In 2012, she was a dance teacher at HeadStart School Islamabad. In 2013, she taught at Kuch Khaas Kuch Khaas – The Centre for Arts, Culture & Dialogue, and at Liberal Arts High School, Islamabad. Presently, she is teaching dance at Faiz Ghar and at her own institute, the Institute of Performing Arts.

=== Performances as a cultural artist ===
In 1994, she performed Kathak Solo at the FTC auditorium, Karachi, launching her self-choreographed dance work. In 1995, she accompanied then Prime Minister Benazir Bhutto with a cultural troupe to Turkmenistan, London, and the USA, projecting a strong cultural image of Pakistan through her lectures, workshops, and magnificent dance performances. She choreographed and danced, in Larkana, in a ballet evoking the life of the late Prime Minister Zulfikar Ali Bhutto, on the anniversary of his death, and gained tremendous recognition for her outstanding talent. She performed at all the World Performing Arts Festival in Pakistan hosted by Rafi Peer Theatre Workshop, from 1995 to 2013. In 2003, she performed for the Arts Council of Pakistan to promote cultural events for the Music Committee Karachi. In 2004, she performed a Kathak dance at the Kodak-HRD Congress Serena Hotel, Islamabad. In 2005, she choreographed and performed at the Lux Style Awards and TVOne Global launch show. On 23 March 2005, Pakistan Day, she performed at the Presidency for President Pervez Musharraf. In 2008, she performed at the Pakistan Embassy in Spain, in an event called Qalandarbass, to promote and support Pakistan's cultural diversity. In 2009, she performed, for the World Population Foundation, an evening called International Mother's Night Islamabad. In 2013, she performed for PC (Pearl-Continental Hotels & Resorts) events in Islamabad, Karachi, Lahore, and Peshawar, for the promotion of classical dance in Pakistan. In 2013, she performed a Kathak and Hip-Hop fusion on International Dance Day at Kuch Khaas Islamabad, and performed at the All Pakistan Music Conference, Lahore. She also performed at Gala Evening Pakistan Chest Society, with Rahat Fateh Ali Khan, IBEX Club Lake View, Islamabad. She performed at the South Asia Labour Conference at Hazuri Bagh, Lahore, Pakistan. In 2014, she performed in a Sufi Kathak musical evening, in Multan, organized by the Honorary Consulate General of Paraguay in honor of the Argentinean ambassador. She performed in a tribute to the poet Faiz Ahmad Faiz's book launch in Sindhi by the Government of Sindh, Karachi, Pakistan and performed at the 5th Alhamra International Conference (Beetay Hoay Din Yaad Aatey Hain) at the Al-hamra Cultural Complex. She also performed in Raqs Mein Hai Sara Jahan as "Dancing Away Differences", celebrating International Dance Day at the Art Council, Karachi. She presented Nuqta, a special Sufi dance performance with live music and poetry on the occasion of the 14th Daniel Pearl World Music Day 2015, in collaboration with Kuch Khaas and the U.S. embassy. She participated as a dance choreographer/trainer in the sixth workshop on capacity building and skills development to strengthen local theatre artists' ability to use theatre to promote social change in Southern Punjab, organized by International Alerts Pakistan, in collaboration with SRAM Studios.

=== Performances as a cultural ambassador ===
She was chosen to represent Pakistan at the Asian Advertising Congress in Seoul, South Korea, in 1985 and at the Great hall of China in 1987. In 1995, she was invited by Citibank and performed for the ex-prime minister of Great Britain Margaret Thatcher at the Lahore Fort. In 2016, she choreographed and performed, as cultural ambassador, at the World Cultural Festival, with 155 countries represented at the Art of Living Foundation of Sri Sri Ravi Shankar in Delhi, India. She has performed in places such Japan, China, Sicily, Rome, Singapore, India, England, Austria, France, Germany, Mauritius, and the United States. Apart from participating in a number of the International Dance and Theatre Festivals in Pakistan, she has represented the country at venues such as the American Dance Festival in the United States, the Young Dancer's Festival in India, and many others.

=== Performances of Pakistan television ===
The 1996 Cricket World Cup was hosted in Pakistan, and Chaudhry was chosen to present a cultural festival in all the major cities. She choreographed for a group of 35 dancers where she acted and danced the character Sassi (from a Sindh folk legend) and the legendary Anarkali in a dance ballet that was televised on Pakistan Television (PTV). From 1995 to 2010, she performed on numerous occasions in Pakistan, such as Eid and National Days and Award Ceremonies for PTV and other TV channels. She gave numerous significant thematic performances on PTV. In 2013, she performed on a PTV classical music programme "Raag Gala". In 2014, she gave a solo performance on the anniversary of PTV World, and with Sufi singer Abida Parveen. In 2015, she performed and choreographed for Firdous-E-Gosh, a Classic Musical Soiree, produced by PTV.

=== Performances for fund raising ===
Nighat Chaudhry performed raising funds for many charities in Pakistan such as the Cancer Society, Association for Children with Emotional and Learning Problems, SOS Children's Villages and UNICEF. In 1991, she performed for Imran Khan’s cancer hospital, a Kathak Guitar fusion with Salman of Junoon. In 1995, she performed for UNICEF in Islamabad. In 2012, to promote peace and love, she also performed with the Sufi rock group JUNOON on the platform "United for Peace" a benefit concert for World Peace. In 2013, she also presented a dance to empower women called Strike Dance Rise, a celebration of women's courage and their determination to live and rise for justice, an e global campaign called One Billion Rising for Justice, in collaboration between Kuch Khaas and the Islamabad-based AMAL Human Development Network.

=== Performances at festivals ===
Nighat Chaudhry has performed to great acclaim in many festivals around the world as well as International Dance and Theatre Festivals in Pakistan. She performed in the American Dance Festival Duke University North Carolina and Faiz Ahmad Faiz Mela Karachi in 1991. She performed in the Young Dancer's and Raindrops festival at the Iskon Hare Rama Hare Krishna center Mumbai India in 1992. She performed a Kathak Solo in the first National Dance Festival Held by the Rafi Peer Theatre Karachi in 1995. She performed in the Mauritius Festival of solidarity for children in the Indian Ocean in 1996. She performed in the International Mystic Music Sufi Festival in Karachi Rafi Peer Theatre Workshop in 2007. In 2010, Nighat was invited by the Engendered Dance Festival New York to present her new dance work on women called Purdah. She performed at the Lincoln Centre and Symphony Space. Her performance was reviewed by the ballet review as the most intense dance performance to come out from a country like Pakistan. She performed at the Wief Johor Bahru Malaysia 8th World Islamic Economic Forum 2012. She performed in the 2nd National Dance Festival, Lahore Rafi Peer Theatre workshop in 2013. She performed in a 5-day festival of music, poetry, literature, and dance celebrating Amir Khusro's work Jamal-E-Khusro in 2014. In 2016, she choreographed and performed as Cultural leading ambassador, in the World Culture Festival amongst representatives of 155 countries at the Art of Living Foundation, of Ravi Shankar, in Delhi, India.

=== Acting and on-screen appearances ===
In 1992, she started her career as an actress; she performed in a video of Pakistan's first "Sufi Rock" Junoon (band), for MTV. She acted in the mini-series Mr. D.J. and Shee Jee and in two long plays: Mystery Theatre and Raqeeb. Then she appeared in an interview on TV Asia, London. In 1993, she played a female lead role in the PTV drama Maigh Malhar – a 13-episode love story set at the time of the division of Pakistan in 1971. She was awarded best actress award for her role in this drama. Then she acted in Jaal, Pakistan's first soap opera of 100 episodes, which went on air in Pakistan and on the satellite channel Zee Tv, from London. In 1994, she performed in Network Television Marketing's (NTM) Prime Time Show. She choreographed and danced in a fusion of Kathak and Modern Dance to Nusrat Fateh Ali Khan's song "Mera Piya Ghar Aya". She appeared in an interview on "Weekend Masala" on NTM. In 1996, she danced in a video based on the achievements of women, called "Aurat", choreographed and danced to a concept on communications for NTM's Viewers Awards. In 2000, she acted in the play Neeli Dhoop and the TV serial Sila. In 2002, she performed in a music video for Sufi rock group Junoon. She acted in a serial called Ma shot in Scotland, which showcased poetry by Pakistan's renowned poet and philosopher Muhammad Iqbal. In 2003, she acted in a Pakistani feature film Kyun Tum Say Itna Pyar Hai, which was directed by Ajab Gul.

=== Nighat Chaudhry Foundation (NCF) ===
Chaudhry established her NGO, the Nighat Chaudhry Foundation (NCF), in 2016; Her vision for NCF is to re-connect the people of Pakistan with their cultural identity and their heritage. She wants to establish performing arts as education, to document and preserve cultural heritage, to prevent the decaying of its presence among society. The NCF's goal is to encourage, empower and create a transformation space for youth, women, and all the people of Pakistan, a platform to embrace cultural heritage and performing arts as a means of human development, a healing of cultural wounds and an evolving of communities with a connection back into the cultural fabric and cultural roots of Pakistan. The Nighat Chaudhry Foundation is meant to guide the people of Pakistan towards a true ownership of cultural heritage.

== Awards and certificates ==
Year	Award/Certificate	Organization
1980	Foundation Course Certificate	Laban Centre for Movement and Dance
1991	Certificate for International Choreograph Workshop	American Dance Festival
1994	Faiz Ahmad Faiz Award	Faiz Foundation Trust
1997	Nigar Awards for Best Actress	NTM TV
1997	Certificate for Theatre and Dance Festival	Rafi Peer Theatre
1999	Certificate for International Festival Pakistan	Rafi Peer Theatre
2000	Maharaj Kathak Award	Malik Art Promoter
2002	Certificate for Performing Arts Festival Pakistan	Rafi Peer Theatre
2002	Solidarity of Pakistan Award	Karachi Festival Seasonal Greetings
2006	Certificate for World Performing Arts Festival	Rafi Peer Theatre
2007	Certificate for World Performing Arts Festival	Rafi Peer Theatre
2007	Women Achievers Awards	Indus Plus TV
2007	Certificate for International Mystic Music Sufi Festival	Rafi Peer Theatre
2007	Certificate for Horisont Mela	Horisont Foundation
2007	Mausikaar Award	Mausikaar Welfare Trust
2009	Certificate for National Drama Festival	Pakistan National Council of Arts
2014	Certificate for Mausikaar	Mausikaar Welfare Trust
2014	Certificate for International Dance Festival	Rafi Peer Theatre
2014	Certificate for Journey Dance Training	Journey Dance
2014	Certificate of Achievement	SRAM Studio Pakistan
2015	Certificate for Music Meet Workshop	Lahore Music Meet
2018	Certificate For News Casting, Anchoring and Program Hosting	University Of Central Punjab
2019	Pride of Performance Award	Government of Pakistan
2020	Masters Of Arts In Dance Technique Pedagogy	Middlesex University
2021	Certificate In Advanced Digital Marketing Pakistan	IDM Pakistan
2022	Certified Skill Diploma In Choreography	Jain University
