= Aansoo =

- Genre: Romance
- Written by: Haseena Moin
- Directed by: Ali Rizvi
- Starring: Talat Hussain; Sakina Samo; Noman Ijaz; Nabeel; Shagufta Ejaz
- Opening theme: 'Tanha Tanha' by Ali Azmat
- Composer: Waqar Ali
- Country of origin: Pakistan
- Original language: Urdu
- No. of seasons: 1
- No. of episodes: 18

Production
- Executive producer: Tasmina Sheikh
- Producer: Zulfiqar Sheikh
- Production location: Pakistan

Original release
- Network: Pakistan Television Corporation
- Release: 2000

Aansoo (transl. Tears) is a Pakistani drama television series that aired on Pakistan Television in 2000. The drama was written by Haseena Moin and directed by Ali Rizvi. The drama became popular because of its interesting and romantic story line and the beautiful shooting locations in Pakistan, Scotland and Ireland. It was the first Pakistani serial to be filmed entirely on a digital camera. The drama serial is considered to be a classic and has aired several times on PTV since its initial release.

The title song of the serial 'Tanha Tanha' sung by Ali Azmat, composed by Waqar Ali and written by Sabir Zafar became a rage during its release and remains popular.

== Plot ==
Aansoo is the story of two families as they recover from tragedies that have torn them apart. Two best friends realize that they are in fact brothers living each other's lives. On the other hand, cultural differences leave two sisters living on opposite sides of the world with no knowledge of each other's existence.

== Synopsis ==
Sami Khan is a Pakistani guy who falls in love with a British-born girl Sofie. Sofie marries Sami Khan and moves to Pakistan. In the beginning, everything goes fine but when Sofie gives birth to a baby girl that brings tension because Sami wanted a baby boy. They soon have two daughters, Imaan and their younger daughter Isha. They quarrel quite often and Sofie can't adjust herself in different culture and surroundings anymore and she moves back to Scotland. Imaan stays with her father and Sofie takes Isha along. Sami Khan has a sister Aaliya. She is married and has a son Saram and they live in Scotland.

Dr. Ahsan marries a Pakistani, Sadia, because his mother forces him to marry her. They have a son Aryan. Dr. Ahsan moves to Scotland and leaves Sadia and Aryan alone in Pakistan. He marries another woman Amna but they don't have a child. Dr. Ahsan returns to Pakistan after two years and takes his son from Sadia and divorces her.

Sadia wants her son back and decides to fight for her rights. She moves to Scotland in search of her son. Then Amna learns that she is expecting a child and she gives birth to a baby boy Danial. One day Sadia finds out about Dr. Ahsan and talks to his second wife and is hire as a nanny in his house and kidnaps Amna's son on the first day for revenge.

After 22 years, Aryan and Denial turn out to be friends. Aryan becomes a doctor just like his father and Denial studies for MBA and they fall in love with the same girl – Isha.

Saram is easy going and loves music. He plays guitar and keyboard and he falls in love with Imaan. Imaan loses her self-confidence and becomes very confused and disturb. She feels very lonely, sad and thinks that her mother doesn't love her. Meanwhile, Isha grows up as an independent girl, enjoys her mother's love and studies Law, whereas, Dr. Ahsan loses his memory and his sanity.

== Cast ==
- Talat Hussain as Dr. Ahsan
- Noman Ijaz as Sami Khan
- Asad Malik as Saram
- Nabeel as Danial
- Maheen Ishaq as Isha
- Shagufta Ejaz as Sadia
- Sakina Samo as Amna
- Fareeda Shabbir as Tai
- Tasmina Sheikh as Iman
- Akram Mohammadi as Mamoon
- Zulfikar Sheikh as Aryan
- Ghazala Javed as Chachi
- Huma Tahir as Aliya
- Rashida Yaqoob as Bua
- Sania Hussain as Sofia
- Hugh Sullivan
- Shakeel as Doctor (cameo)

Production crew

- Haseena Moin (writer)
- Zulfiqar Sheikh (producer)
- Ali Rizvi (director)
