= Sara Loren =

Pakistani actress and model (born 1985)

- ساره لورين
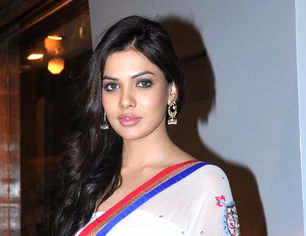
- Loren in 2013
- Born: Sara Hussain; 11 December 1985 (age 40); Kuwait City, Kuwait
- Other name: Mona Lisa
- Occupations: Actress; Model
- Years active: 2003 – present

Sara Hussain (Urdu: ساره لورين), better known as Sara Loren (born 11 December 1985), is a Pakistani actress and model. She appears in Urdu and Hindi movies and television. She played the title role in the film Barkhaa in 2015.

== Early life ==
Loren was born on 11 December 1985 in Kuwait City, in a Rajput family. Her grandfather migrated to Kuwait from Rajasthan following the Partition of India, and her father and mother were born in Pakistan. During an interview in India she said she belongs to a multi-cultural background as her father is a Rajput from Rajasthan, and also said that she goes to the temple. As a teenager, she relocated with her family to Lahore following the death of her father.

== Career ==
Loren made her bollywood debut in the 2010 Pooja Bhatt's romantic thriller film Kajraare opposite Himesh Reshammiya and later played seductress Nisha in the 2013 film Murder 3. The following year she starred in Yasir Nawaz's Anjuman for which she won the Tarang Housefull Awards—Best Actress in a Leading Role. Loren made her acting debut in 2003 with the serial Rabia Zinda Rahegi. She has also appeared in Mahnoor, Meharun Nisa, Makan, Mehar Bano aur Shah Bano, Sandal, Riyasat, Help of a Ghost, Dupatta, Umrao jan-e-adaa, Madhosh and was nominated for Best Drama Actress for her performance in Main Mar Gai Shaukat Ali at 2nd Pakistan Media Awards.

Loren acted in the stage performances of Anarkali, Shahyad Issi Ka Naam Mohabbat Hai Sheiftaa, in Karachi and Delhi. Loren made her screen debut with the 2010 Pooja Bhatt's Bollywood film Kajraare. The following year, she had a cameo appearance in song "Love Mein Ghum" in Reema Khan's Love Mein Ghum. She then played the role of seductress Nisha in the 2013 film Murder 3. The following year, she made her Lollywood debut in Yasir Nawaz's Anjuman. In 2014, she did an item number "Saiyaan" in Syed Faisal Bukhari's Saltanat. She then appeared in Shadaab Mirza's Barkhaa, where she played a small town girl turned into bar dancer. The film ran for 50 days but was commercially declared a disaster. In 2026, she made a comeback for action film Bulleh.

== Filmography ==
=== Television ===
Year	Title	Role	Network
2002	Jannat	Nagina	PTV
2003	Rabia Zinda Rahegi	Rabia	ARY Digital
2003	Jahan Basain Dildar	Nazo	PTV
2003	Umrao Jaan Ada	Umrao Jaan	Geo TV
2005	Mah-e-Neem Shab	Khadija	PTV
2005	Riyasat	Aamna	ARY Digital
2006	Kajal	Kajal	Geo TV
2006	Makan	Nazli	Geo TV
2007	Pyar Mein	Rimal	PTV
2008	Noori	Noori	PTV
2008	Piyaasi	Sajila	Hum TV
2009	Sirf Aik Baar	Maheen	TV One Pakistan
2010	Kisi Ko Maan Liya Apna	Roshni	Hum TV
2010	Madhosh	Lubna	TV One
2010	Tere Liye	Fiza	ARY Digital
2010	Sandal	Sandal	Geo TV
2010	Tumhain Kuch Yaad Hai Jaana	Dariya	Geo TV
2011	Kaisi Yeh Agan	Ramla	PTV Home
2011	Anokhi	Aalan/Aini	A-Plus TV
2011	Main Mar Gai Shaukat Ali	Allah Rakhi	A-Plus TV
2011	Zard Patay Sa Yeh Dil	Neha	TV One Pakistan
2011	Jan-e-Ada	Ada	ATV (Pakistan)
2012	Mehar Bano aur Shah Bano	Shah Bano	Hum TV

=== Telefilms ===
Year	Title	Network
2008	Romeo	Indus TV
2009	Mem Sahab	Indus TV

=== Web series ===
Year	Title	Role	Network
2022	Malika Encounter	Mariya AKA Malika	UrduFlix

=== Film ===
Year	Title	Role	Language	Notes
2004	Mahnoor	Mahnoor	Urdu	Debut
2004	Meharun Nisa	Meharun Nisa	Urdu	
2007	Help of a Ghost	Afshan	Urdu	
2007	Kaafila	Niharika	Hindi	Bollywood debut (as Mona Liza)
2010	Kajraare	Nargis	Hindi	
2011	Love Mein Ghum	Herself	Urdu	Special appearance in song "Love Mein Ghum"
2013	Murder 3	Nisha	Hindi	
2013	Anjuman	Anjum Hayat Khan	Urdu	
2014	Sultanat	Herself	Urdu	Special appearance in song "Saiyaan"
2015	Barkhaa	Barkhaa	Hindi	
2016	Ishq Click	Sophie Dias Vardhan	Hindi	
2018	Jawani Phir Nahi Ani 2	Herself	Urdu	Special appearance in song "Ishq Hoa Jo Taari"
2019	Fraud Saiyyan	Payal	Hindi	
2022	Ishrat Made in China	Jia	Urdu	
2026	Bullah	Sohpie	Urdu	

== Awards and nominations ==
Year	Award	Category	Result	Title	Ref.
2005	4th Lux Style Awards	Best TV Actress (Terrestrial)	Nominated	Mah-e-Neem Shab	
2011	2nd Pakistan Media Awards	Best Drama Actress	Nominated	Main Mar Gai Shaukat Ali	
2013	Tarang Housefull Awards	Best Actress in Leading Role	Won	Anjuman	
