= Ajab Gul =

Pakistani actor and film director (born 1964)

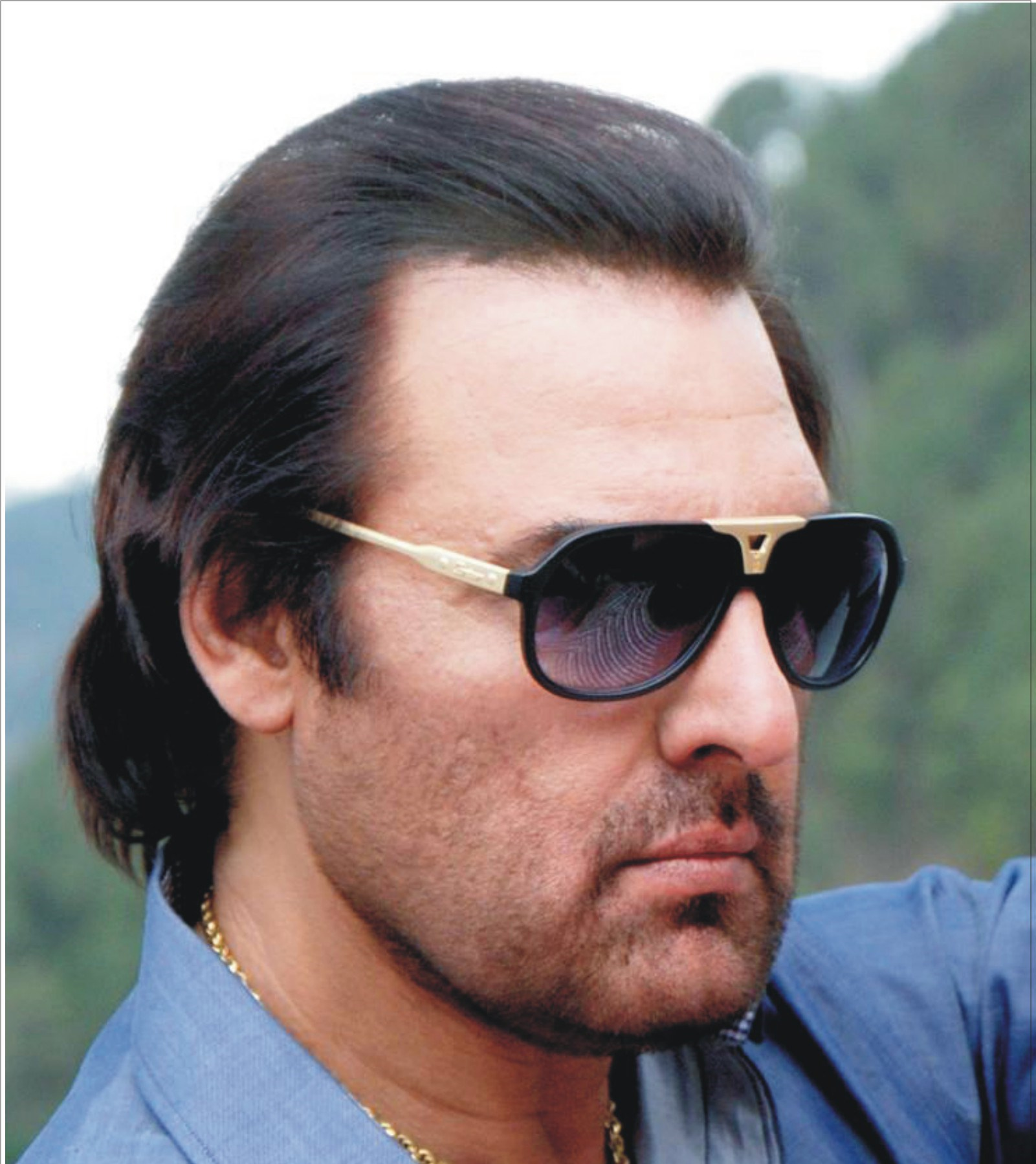
- Born: 12 April 1964 (age 62); Peshawar, West Pakistan (present-day Khyber Pakhtunkhwa, Pakistan)
- Education: Army Public School Peshawar
- Occupations: Actor; film director; producer; music director
- Years active: 1984–present

Ajab Gul (Pashto: عجب گل) is a Pakistani actor, film director, producer and music director who predominantly works in Pashto-language cinema. He has also worked in Urdu-language as well Punjabi-language cinema.

== Early life and education ==
Ajab Gul was born on April 12, 1964, in Peshawar, Khyber Pakhtunkhwa, Pakistan. He completed his primary and secondary education at Army Public School (APS) Peshawar; during his student years, he trained in martial arts, and later earned a Master’s degree in Pashto from the University of Peshawar.

== Career ==
=== Actor ===
Gul began his acting career at the Pakistan Television (PTV) Peshawar Center, making his television debut in the Urdu-language drama serial Mausam (1984).

He has starred in commercial films such as Yaar Baash, Sharabi, and Kyun Tum Say Itna Pyar Hai, as well as critically acclaimed films like Dukhtar. He has also appeared in a number of successful television serials including Farayb, Girift, Pyas, Sooraj Kay Sath Sath, Musafatein, Pathar, Ghulam Gardish, Taawan, Chashman, Dastar, and Sheharzaad.

=== Director ===
Gul made his directorial debut with the film Khoey Ho Tum Kahan (KHTK), which had a modest but successful theatrical run upon its release in 2001. The film was praised for its soundtrack, composed by Zain, and for its cinematography. Its success reportedly inspired a similar Indian production, Humraaz, released in 2002.

==== Theatre ====
His theatrical play Janam Janam ki Maile Chadar set a record in South East Asia with 1,680 consecutive performances.

==== Music direction ====
Ajab Gul also contributed to the music direction of his projects, notably supervising the soundtrack of Kyun Tum Say Itna Pyar Hai.

=== Comeback and later work ===
In 2006, Gul returned with the commercially successful Kyun Tum Say Itna Pyar Hai, considered a follow-up to his earlier film KHTK. In 2012, he directed the stage production Rahman Baba.

== Selected filmography ==
=== Films ===
Year	Film	Language
1988	Qayamat Se Qayamat Tak	Urdu
1990	Jangloos	Urdu
1990	Zehrelay	Urdu/Punjabi
1991	Sar Kata Insan	Urdu
1991	Chattan	Urdu/Punjabi
1994	Sarkata Insaan	Urdu
1995	Ajab Khan	Urdu
1995	Talismi Jazira	Urdu
1996	Charsa karke bharey	Pashto
1996	Ajab Khan	Pashto
1999	Chaskedar	Pashto
1999	Qismat	Urdu
1999	Sarey Stergey	Pashto
2001	Khoey Ho Tum Kahan	Urdu
2005	Kyun Tum Say Itna Pyar Hai	Urdu
2006	Zanzeer	Pashto
2006	Sabar Sha Zargiya	Pashto
2006	Yaar Baash	Pashto
2007	Akhir Zra Day Kana	Pashto
2007	Dunya Mey Sta Sanama	Pashto
2007	Godfather	Urdu
2008	Sharabi	Pashto
2008	I Love You	Pashto
2008	Sharif Badmash	Pashto
2008	Pekhawer Kho Pekhawer Day Kana	Pashto
2009	Gul Soray Soray Karm	Pashto
2009	Zakham	Pashto
2010	Jaal	Pashto
2011	Sholay	Pashto
2012	Intaqaam	Pashto
2013	Qurbani	Pashto
2013	Ghairat	Pashto
2014	Naseebo	Punjabi
2014	Da Badmashno Badmash	Pashto
2014	Dukhtar	Pashto/Urdu
2015	Iqrar	Pashto
2016	Janaan	Pashto/Urdu
2016	Salute	Pashto/Urdu
2017	Zakhmona	Pashto
2017	Lambey	Pashto
2017	Juram Ao Saza	Pashto
2018	Zidi ao Badmash	Pashto
2018	Zandaan	Pashto
2018	Da Gandageero Gandageer	Pashto
2018	Da Badamalo Badamala	Pashto
2019	Di Ta Badmashi Wai	Pashto
2019	Badmashano Sara Ma Chera	Pashto

==== Director ====
Year	Film	Actor	Notes
2001	Khoey Ho Tum Kahan	Yes	Directorial debut
2005	Kyun Tum Say Itna Pyar Hai	Yes	Also writer and music director
2010	Jaal	Yes	
2012	Intaqaam	Yes	
2012	Ma Ba Sanga Hera We	Yes	

=== Television series ===
Year	Title	Role	Network
1988	Sooraj Key Sath Sath	Haris	PTV
1989	Pyas	Jenwra	PTV
1993	Fareb	Yashir Kamal	PTV
1993	Sheharzaad	Faiz	PTV
1994	Maan Chale Ka Soda	Aamir	PTV
1994	Heer Waris Shah	Ranjha	PTV
1998	Ghulam Gardish	Ali Jan	PTV
1999	Kikar Kanday	Chaudhry Khawar	PTV
2000	Tawan	Babar	PTV
2002	Dulhan	Ali Khan	PTV
2002	God Father	Danish	PTV
2004	Dastar	Bakhtiyar	PTV
2006	Chashman	Zarak	Aaj TV
2018	Deedan	Gulbaz Khan	A-Plus TV

== See also ==
- List of Pakistani actors
- List of Lollywood actors
