= Murad (film) =

- Official poster
- Directed by: Kamran Qureshi
- Written by: Zafar Mairaj
- Story by: Zafar Mairaj
- Produced by: Iram Qureshi
- Starring: Sohail Asghar; Qazi Wajid; Nabeel; Zaheen Tahira; Kamran Jilani; Tabraiz Shah; Hareem Qureshi and Sabir Qureshi.
- Cinematography: Irfan Ahsan; Naeem Ahmad
- Edited by: Adnan Wai Qureshi
- Music by: Mohsin Allah Ditta
- Production company: Evergreen Media Europe
- Distributed by: Zee TV Network; Indus TV Network
- Release date: 1 July 2003 (Karachi)
- Running time: 50 minutes
- Country: United Kingdom
- Language: Urdu/Hindi with English Subtitles

Murad, also known as Eunuch's Motherhood, is a 2003 Urdu/Hindi language television drama film directed by Kamran Qureshi, written by Zafar Mairaj and produced by Iram Qureshi.

The film is based on the motherhood of a eunuch, the term to describe a transgender person. Sohail Asghar played the role of a eunuch called Saima, who kept struggling all life and finally succeeded in winning the love of her adopted son, when he became a father himself.

Murad was awarded Best Telefilm of the year, Kamran Qureshi won Best Film Director Award and first prize of Rs. 500,000 in Indus Telefilm Festival 2003. Sultana Siddiqui presented special award to Sohail Asghar in The 1st Indus Drama Awards 2005, on his outstanding performance in Murad.

The film was broadcast in 2004 on Indus TV Network in Pakistan & UAE and in 2005 on Zee TV UK & United States as part of film series 'Maa Aur Mamta', which consist of 13 films including Murad.

== Plot ==
The story revolves around a hijra, Saima, who adopts a child, Murad. Murad dislikes Saima's work as a dancer. Saima tries hard to fit into other professions as a male but people mock her. She then tries and fails to get job as a woman. She takes to begging on the street to earn her living, but this angers Murad. She then sends Murad to hostel and starts dancing again to cover the cost of his education. To avoid his hatred and disapproval, she never visits.

Murad accepts a scholarship and goes abroad. Later Saima receives an invitation to an aqiqah (newborn welcoming ceremony) from an unknown person. She accepts, and when she arrives at the party, Saima learns that it was Murad who invited her, so that she could meet his wife and son, and to thank her for all what she had done for him.

== Cast ==
- Sohail Asghar as Saima
- Qazi Wajid as Bobo
- Nabeel Zafar as Naddo
- Zaheen Tahira as Grandma
- Kamran Jilani as Murad (Adult)
- Tabraiz Shah as Murad (young)
- Hareem Qureshi as Murad (Baby)
- Sabir Qureshi as School headteacher

External videos
- The trailer of Murad

== Awards ==
Indus Telefilm Festival 2003

- Winner: Best TV Film Award - Iram Qureshi
- Winner: Best Writer TV Film Award - Zafar Mairaj
- Winner: Best Director TV Films Award - Kamran Qureshi

The 1st Indus Drama Awards 2005

- Winner: Special Award for outstanding performance in Murad - Sohail Asghar
- Winner: Best TV Series Award for Maa Aur Mamta
- Winner: Best TV Series Writer Award for Maa Aur Mamta
- Winner: Best TV Series Director Award for Maa Aur Mamta
