= Indonesian Television Awards =

- Awarded for: Excellence in Indonesian television
- Country: Indonesia
- Presented by: Media Nusantara Citra
- First award: 2016
- Website: www.indonesiantvawards.com

Television/radio coverage
- Network: RCTI; MNCTV (2016–2020); GTV (2021–present)

The Indonesian Television Awards (abbreviated as ITA) is an annual awards for the most popular television program, television personality and musician in Indonesia. It based on a poll of viewers' top of mind regarding television programs in Indonesia conducted in 22 cities from 17 provinces in Indonesia by Roy Morgan Research. The award was first held in 2016 and broadcast by RCTI and MNCTV.

A total of 12 categories were selected from the results of a survey conducted by the Roy Morgan Research and Provetic team based on a direct survey among the community in 22 cities in 17 provinces. According to Roy Morgan's Client Service Director Ningsih Soemitro, Roy Morgan conducted a direct survey to television viewers to find out which television programs were favorites, seen from top of mind or remembered spontaneously by viewers.

Next, the assessment of each nomination continued by involving the community. Here, the public would determine the most popular award recipients through media social, Twitter, Facebook and the official Indonesian Television Awards website by implementing a one ID one vote system. Voting calculations and analysis were carried out by Provetic to maintain the accuracy of calculations and validation of elections. The voting procedure through Instagram was added in 2017, Twitter was removed in 2018, RCTI+ was added in 2020 and the website was removed in 2021.

The 2018 edition of the award won the 2019 Panasonic Gobel Awards for the most favorite television special program.

== See also ==
- List of Asian television awards
