= Maalik (2016 film) =

2016 film by Ashir Azeem

- Theatrical release poster
- مالک
- Directed by: Ashir Azeem
- Written by: Ashir Azeem
- Produced by: Ashir Azeem; Bushra Ashir Azeem
- Starring: Ashir Azeem; Farhan Ally Agha; Sajid Hasan; Ehteshamuddin; Hassan Niazi; Adnan Shah Tipu; Rashid Farooqui; Tatmain ul Qulb; Shakeel Hussain Khan; Muhammad Abdullah Achakzai
- Cinematography: Imran Ali
- Edited by: Rizwan AQ & Umer Shah Syed
- Music by: Sahir Ali Bagga
- Production company: Media Hub
- Distributed by: Footprint Entertainment
- Release date: 8 April 2016 (Pakistan)
- Running time: 155 minutes
- Country: Pakistan
- Languages: Urdu & English
- Budget: Rs. 4 crore (US$140,000)
- Box office: est. Rs. 7.30 crore (US$260,000) (Pakistan)

Maalik (Urdu: مالک) is a 2016 Pakistani political-thriller film directed, written and produced by Ashir Azeem. It was released on 8 April 2016 in cinemas across Pakistan under the production banner of Media Hub. The film was banned in Pakistan for political reasons after being cleared by all three Censor Boards of the country with Universal (Unrestricted) rating. Opposition parties in Pakistan welcomed the film for showing reality and the KPK govt allowed screening of 'Maalik'. Maalik is the only Pakistani film to be banned by the federal government after it was cleared by all Censor Boards. The film cast includes Ashir Azeem, Farhan Ally Agha, Sajid Hassan, Hassan Niazi, Adnan Shah, Rashid Farooqi, Ehteshamuddin and Tatmain ul Qulb in key roles.

== Synopsis ==
Maalik narrates their stories; A Pathan family that escapes from the ravages of the Soviet war in Afghanistan and settles in Karachi. A Special Services Group SSG officer Major Asad (Ashir Azeem) who undergoes a personal tragedy and starts a private security company (Black Ops Pvt. Ltd) in Karachi. His SSG colleagues keep joining the company on their retirements. An idealist school master who suffers greatly under a cruel feudal lord and settles in Karachi and finally the Feudal Lord who becomes the Chief Minister of Sindh and unleashes a reign of terror on all that cross his path. Maalik is a story of love, loyalty, honor, family value, idealism, courage and dignity against all odds, and across all sections of society from the poor and the struggling to the highest levels of wealth and power.

== Plot ==
The film starts with Master Mohsin telling a judge to take action for the pending cases in court. A kid who is on his way to the gym and is the son of an affluent businessman is being kidnapped by some kidnappers from the road by faking road accident and making unconscious his guard who saw kidnappers face. With not much help from police they contact a private security agency head Major Asad, who runs his security agency and help those who are helpless and law does not take their cases seriously. He told the kid father, he would help him on one condition and that is that if tomorrow someone else will ask for help he will help without any hesitation, he agreed with the help of his highly professional squad he not only led the team to recover the businessman's son but also a minor child who had been held captive by them and was in critical condition

== Cast ==
- Ashir Azeem as Major Asad
- Farhan Ally Agha as Major Haider
- Sajid Hassan as Gen. Amjad
- Mohammed Ehteshamuddin as Master Mohsin
- Hassan Niazi as Chief Minister
- Adnan Shah Tipu as Faridday
- Rashid Farooqui as Inspector
- Tatmain ul Qalb as Sherry
- Abdul Aziz Jamal as Chief Minister's Assistant
- Nosher Samuel as Rasheed
- Shakeel Hussain Khan as Musa
- Naeema Garaj as Asma
- Kashif Hashmi as Jamshed
- Rodney Perrera as Faisal Jamshed
- Owais Sheikh as Shamsher Singh
- Imran Mir as Sheikh Altaf
- Faizan Shaikh as Muneer
- Bushra Ashir Azeem
- Lubna Aslam as Fatima
- Erum Azam as Ayesha ( Master Mohsin's daughter )
- Mariam Ansari as Ujji
- Syed Kumail Raza as Azal
- Sabreen Baloch
- Kaleem Achakzai
- Nazeer Durrani
- Pakiza Khan as Farishtey
- Basit Faryad

== Production ==
=== Filming ===
Shoot of Maalik commenced on 21 September 2014. Maalik is one of the largest films shot in Pakistan and had a scheduled shoot of 100 days. Entire film has been shot on location. The locations of the film are exotic and range from fields and villages of interior Sindh to rugged Mountains of Baluchistan to the corridors of power of the government. The film has been shot on 4k format, using Red and BlackMagic cameras. Extensive use of steadicam and professional drones for aerial filming has been made. Extensive props and hardware have been used in the film including multiple helicopters MI 17 and MI 35 Gunships, T 55 Tanks and C130 Hercules aircraft. Pakistan's Special Forces has provided extensive support including advanced weapons, ammunition and training to the cast and crew.

=== Marketing ===
The first look of film was revealed online in March 2015. Film's teaser trailer was released on Pakistan Independence Day, 2015 on Vimeo. Theatrical trailer of film was released on social media on 7 March 2016 followed by a final poster on 25 March. Few character posters were also released at the end of same month.

== Reception ==
=== Critical reception ===
The film received mixed reviews. Omair Alavi of The News International reviewed the film by saying: "Maalik is a film that has been produced for those who love Pakistan and want it to prosper. The film commands multiple viewing because for die-hard Lollywood fans, this ‘Hollywood’ treatment would be hard to digest. In short, Maalik leaves a lasting impression and is a must-watch." Rafay Mahmood of The Express Tribune called the film "unpolished" and "jingoistic propaganda" that "lacks coherence." He gave it rating of three out of five stars. He said: "‘Maalik’ is not a masterpiece yet isn't something that should be missed. Watch it without any expectations and you might as well be surprised" Moayyed Jafri of The News International wrote that the film, "shows that the armed forces are learning the ropes of using mass media in paving public opinion." Sulman Ali of The Nation said "the movie is for a common Pakistani who has grudges against the country's political leaders and is waiting for a ‘miracle’ to happen." Writing in The Express Tribune, Aliza Qaisar called the film, "a cesspool of ludicrousness.".

=== Ban ===
On 26 April 18 days after releasing the film was banned by Sindh Board of Film Censor, Government of Sindh. However, the Sindh Chief Minister Qaim Ali Shah intervened and asked the ministry not to issue it as it would be 'against the freedom of expression'. On 27 April, The Federal Government of Pakistan has banned Maalik nationwide in a notification issued on Wednesday. In a series of tweets, writer and director of film Ashir Azeem strongly condemned ban on his film. On 7 September 2016 ban on film was lifted by LHC and the film was re-released on limited screens in Karachi, Lahore and Islamabad. The Supreme Court noticed that the (CBFC) overstepped its authority by banning the film Maalik. The Court declined watching the movie and expected the government law officer to watch the film.

== Accolades ==
Ceremony	Category	Recipient	Result	Reference
16th Lux Style Awards	Best Lead Actor in a Film	Ashir Azeem	Nominated	
16th Lux Style Awards	Best Female Playback in a Film	Masuma Anwar for Naina Roye	Nominated	

== Soundtrack ==
Malik's soundtrack consisted of four songs by Masuma Anwar, Rahat Fateh Ali Khan and Sahir Ali Bagga. Lyrics were written by Imran Raza. Sahir Ali Bagga composed the Music. The Soundtrack was a hit.

All lyrics are written by Imran Raza; all music is composed by Sahir Ali Bagga.

No.	Title	Singer	Length
1.	"Maalik"	Sahir Ali Bagga	04:10
2.	"Naina Roye"	Masuma Anwar	05:54
3.	"Man Mora"	Rahat Fateh Ali Khan	05:06
4.	"Nazriya"	Rahat Fateh Ali Khan	04:42
Total length:			15:52

== Box-Office Collection ==
The estimated numbers per city for Maalik on the box-office collected:

- Rs. 40 lakh (US$14,000) in Karachi
- Rs. 35 lakh (US$13,000) in Lahore
- Rs. 25 lakh (US$8,900) in Islamabad
- In other cities – Rs. 20 lakh (US$7,200)

The number adds up to Rs. 1.20 crore (US$43,000). The numbers for the second day and how the movie fared internationally have not been revealed as yet. However, locally the Box Office collections for Maalik's first weekend have been predicted to go beyond the Rs. 5 crore (US$180,000) figure.

Note:- All these conversions of PKR to USD are of 27 December 2016.

== See also ==
- List of Pakistani films of 2016
- List of films banned in Pakistan
