= Nabeel (actor) =

Pakistani actor, writer and director (born 1968)

Nabeel Zafar
- نبیل ظفر
- Born: Muhammad Nabeel Zafar; 1 September 1968 (age 58); Faisalabad, Punjab, Pakistan
- Other name: Nabeel
- Occupations: Actor; Director; Producer; Screenwriter
- Years active: 1990–present
- Known for: Dhuwan (PTV); Bulbulay (ARY Digital)
- Spouse: Salma Nabeel
- Children: Jibraeel Nabeel; Musa Nabeel; Isa Nabeel; Fatima Nabeel

Muhammad Nabeel Zafar (Urdu: محمد نبیل ظفر; born 1 September 1968), known mononymously as Nabeel, is a Pakistani television actor, director, producer and screenwriter.

He is known for the comedy sitcom Bulbulay on ARY Digital in which he plays the role of Nabeel since 2009. He also appeared in the 1994 drama Dhuwan on PTV Home, as well in Honeymoon and Shadi Ka Laddu on Express Entertainment.

== Early and personal life ==
Nabeel Zafar was born on 1 September 1968 in Layallpur (now Faisalabad), Punjab, Pakistan and resides in Karachi.

He married Salma Nabeel on 1 January 2000. They have four children.

== Career ==
Nabeel has been active in the television industry since 1990 in PTV plays such as Din, telecast in 1992. He played a doctor in PTV's popular show Dhuwan in 1994.

Later, he started appearing regularly in the television serials at PTV, playing lead roles in Ajaib Khana, Shahla Kot, Alao and Qissa Saat Raaton Ka. In 2009 he started producing and playing the lead role in ARY Digital's sitcom, Bulbulay. Nabeel joined BOL Entertainment as President and CEO.

== Filmography ==
=== Television series ===
Year	Title	Role	Producer	Director	Screenwriter	Network	Notes
1990	Daldal	Asad				PTV	
1991	Raig Zar	Riaz				PTV	
1992	Din	Zeeshan				PTV	
1993	Agar	Ayaz				PTV	
1993	Sachyar	Fareed				PTV	Anthology: Ajj Di Kahani
1994	Dhuwan	Dawood				PTV	
1994	Alao	Daniyal				PTV	
1994	Lawrence of Thalabia	Saleem				PTV	Anthology: Qami Kahani
1995	Aapa	Tasadduq				PTV	
1995	Uraan	Khalid				PTV	
1996	Qissa Saat Raaton Ka	Majid				PTV	
1996	Sona Mila Na Pee Milay	Nawab				PTV	Anthology: Hairat Kadah
1997	Ajaib Khana	Mohsin Salman				PTV	
1998	Ghareeb-e-Shehar	Nisar				PTV	Anthology: Aik Mohabat Sau Afsanay
1999	Samjhota	Yusuf				PTV	
1999	Dais Pardais	Adil				PTV	
1999	Pindar	Faraz				PTV	
2000	Pehli Khwahish	Mustafa				PTV	
2000	Mein Sach Nahi Boloon Ga	Muhammad Siddiq				PTV	
2000	Aansoo	Danial				PTV	
2001	Badlon Par Basera	Fareedoon				PTV	
2002	Shahla Kot	Chaudhry Sarfraz				PTV	
2002	Thori Khushi Thora Ghum	Dilawar				PTV	
2006	Manzil	Mehroz Shahani				PTV	
2007	Aurat Aur Char Devari	Mureed				PTV	
2009–2017	Bulbulay (Season 1)	Nabeel	Yes			ARY Digital	
2010–2011	Aankh Salamat Andhay Log	Zeeshan				A-Plus TV	
2011	Love Ke Liye	Ali				Hum TV	
2011–2020	Dugdugi		Yes			ARY Digital	
2012	Honeymoon	Sarmad				Express Entertainment	
2012–2013	Shadi Ka Laddu					Express Entertainment	
2013–2014	Dulha Bhai		Yes	Yes	Yes	Urdu 1	
2013–2015	Rasgullay		Yes			ARY Digital	
2014	Mohabbat		Yes			ARY Digital	
2014–2016	Joru Ka Ghulam		Yes			Hum TV	
2019–present	Bulbulay (season 2)	Nabeel	Yes	Yes		ARY Digital	
2023	Sar-e-Rah	Shabbir Ahmed				ARY Digital	
2025	Sher	Chaudhry Shujaat				ARY Digital	

=== Telefilms ===
Year	Title	Role	Reference
1990s	Daldal	Dr. Daud	
2003	Murad	Eunuch Naddo	
2006	Burns Road Ki Neelofar	Hamid	

== See also ==
- List of Pakistani actors
