= Mehman (disambiguation) =

Mehman is a village in Aliabad Rural District, in the Central District of Hashtrud County, East Azerbaijan Province, Iran.

Mehman may refer to:

- Mehman Aliyev, Director of Turan Information Agency, a Baku-based news agency
- Mehman Azizov (born 1976), Azerbaijani judoka
- Mehman Huseynov (born 1992), Azerbaijani journalist and human rights activist
- Mehman Sayadov (1972-1992), Azeri fighter and National Hero of Azerbaijan, and the warrior of the Karabakh war
- Mehman (TV series), 2008 Pakistani television series

== See also ==
- Mehmaan (disambiguation)
- Chak Mehman, a village in Dera Baba Nanak in Gurdaspur district of Punjab State, India
- Mehman Duyeh, a village in Damankuh Rural District, in the Central District of Damghan County, Semnan Province, Iran
