= Sultana Zafar =

Pakistani actress (1955-2021)

- سلطانہ ظفر
- Born: Sultana Begum; 21 February 1935; Hyderabad, Pakistan
- Died: 16 July 2021 (aged 86); Dallas, Texas, United States
- Education: University of Hyderabad
- Occupation: Actress
- Years active: 1972–2021
- Spouse: Zafar Ali (husband)
- Children: 4
- Relatives: Yahya Bakhtiar (cousin); Huma Akbar (niece); Zeba Bakhtiar (niece); Ali Haider (nephew); Azaan Sami Khan (grand-nephew)

Sultana Zafar (21 February 1935 – 16 July 2021) was a Pakistani actress. Sultana acted in numerous television dramas and was known for her roles in the dramas Munkir, Ana, Zid and Tanhaiyaan. She used to run her boutique called Armale Studios in Dallas, Texas.

== Early life ==
Sultana was born on 21 February 1935 in Hyderabad, Pakistan. She completed her studies at the University of Hyderabad.

== Career ==
Sultana started acting in dramas of PTV Centre Karachi in 1972. Sultana was known for being well-mannered, and for her fine speech and graceful and dignified presence, which helped her and became the reasons for her success in the acting career. She was also known for her serious style acting with her Hyderabad accent dialogue delivery. Sultana portrayed characters imbibing family values and traditions of the time on PTV in the 1970s, 1980s and 1990s. She was noted for her roles in dramas Akhri Chattan, Aroosa, Khala Khairan and Aangan Terha. She also appeared in dramas Akhri Chattan, Nadan Nadia, Ana, Zeenat, Tanhaiyaan and Babar. Since then she appeared in dramas Ru Baru, Zid, Haq Meher, Woh and Munkir.

== Personal life ==
Sultana was married to actor Zafar Ali and had three children and she used to live in Dallas in the United States. There she used to run her boutique called Armale Studios. The actress Huma Akbar is her niece, together they worked in drama Shaheen and Huma also appeared in dramas Karawaan, Choti Choti Baatein and Khaleej.

== Death ==
Sultana died at the age of 86 in Dallas, Texas, on 16 July 2021.

== Filmography ==
=== Television ===
Year	Title	Role	Network
1980	Shaheen	Khatoon Begum	PTV
1982	Nishan-e-Haider	Khursheed Begum	PTV
1983	Maikay Ka Bakra	Begum Sahiba	PTV
1984	Aangan Terha	Maryam	PTV
1984	Ana	Nadira	PTV
1985	Akhri Chattan	Malika Begum	PTV
1985	Tanhaiyaan	Zara and Sanya's mother	PTV
1986	Dastak	Akhtar's mother	PTV
1987	Ghar Rama	Dadi	PTV
1988	Khala Khairan	Bipasha	PTV
1991	Studio 2 1/2: Comedy Specialist Anwar Maqsood	Begum Akhtar	PTV
1991	Zeenat	Sara	PTV
1992	Aap Aur Hum	Amna Muneer	STN
1993	Agar	Flora	PTV
1994	Adha Dil	Bilal's mother	PTV
1994	Aroosa	Atiya	PTV
1996	Babar	Aisan Daulat Begum	PTV
1997	Nadan Nadia	Zareen	PTV
1997	Anokhi	Razia	PTV
1998	Samandar Hai Darmiyan	Shahzad's mother	STN
1999	Kangan	Buwa	PTV
1999	Afsoon Khawab	Aapa	PTV
1999	Andheray Darechey	Riffat's mother	PTV
2000	Aur Zindagi Badalti Hai	Bua	PTV
2005	Shiddat	Ismat Ara	Hum TV
2008	Khawab Tooth Jate Hain	Laila's mother	Geo TV
2014	Woh Season 2	Bua Begum	Hum TV
2014	Ru Baru	Jameel's mother	Hum TV
2014	Haq Meher	Zubair's mother	ARY Digital
2014	Zid	Aapa Jan	Hum TV
2017	Munkir	Dado	TV One

=== Telefilm ===
Year	Title	Role
2011	Aurat	Chanda's mother
