= Imran Aslam =

Imran Aslam may refer to:

- Imran Aslam (actor) (born 1981), Pakistani television actor
- Imran Aslam (journalist) (1952–2022), Pakistani journalist and media personality
