= Ali Haider (singer) =

Pakistani singer (born 1967)

- Born: 22 September 1967 (age 59); Karachi, Sindh, Pakistan
- Origin: Karachi
- Genre: Pop
- Occupations: Singer-songwriter; Television host; Actor; Fashion designer
- Instruments: Vocals; Guitar
- Years active: 1988–present
- Label: Mystic Records-Saregama-EMI
- Spouse: Sabeeka Haider (m. 2006)
- Children: 3, including Alishba Haider
- Relatives: Yahya Bakhtiar (uncle); Sultana Zafar (aunt); Zeba Bakhtiar (cousin); Azaan Sami Khan (nephew); Huma Akbar (cousin)
- Website: alihaiderofficial.com

Ali Haider (Urdu: علی حیدر, born 22 September 1967) is a Pakistani pop singer and musician. He had a number of hit songs in the 1990s, including Poorani Jeans, which appears on his 1993 album Sandesa.

== Personal life ==
He married Sabeeka Haider in 2006 and has three children including singer Alishba Haider. After the death of his young son in 2009, Ali Haider quit making music for some time and turned to religion. His autobiography describes this phase of his life.

== Career ==
=== Music ===
He began his music career in 1988 and gained popularity in the 1990s.

In 2012 he returned to mainstream music after a three-year break following the death of his son, a period during he was mainly involved in Islamic music, singing hamd and naat.

In 2025, Haider collaborated with Ali Zafar to recreate the track "Zalim Nazron Se" for Zafar's album Roshni. They also performed the song at the 2025 Hum Awards in Houston, and filmed the music video in Hollywood, Los Angeles.

=== Acting ===
He became an actor in the mid-1990s, with roles in PTV dramas such as Tum Se Kehna Tha.

He acted in a Pakistani film, Chalo Ishq Larain, released in 2002.

In 2013 he returned to TV with the sitcom Ek aur Ek Dhai.

=== Fashion design ===
He has been designing under his own clothing label Qarar.

=== Hosting ===
Having previously hosted religious TV shows on different channels, in 2021 he became the host of his own The Ali Haider Show, running on American channel NTV Houston.

== Discography ==
Studio albums

Year	Album name
1988	Jane Jan Sun
1989	Chahat
1990	Tarang
1991	Qarar
1993	Sandesa
1994	Sanwala Saloona
1994	Zalim Nazron Se
1995	Dastaan
1996	Jania
1998	Mahi
1999	Saiyyaan
2000	Jadoo (also known as Jadu - Dance 2 Trance)
2002	Chandni Raatein
2003	Tera Naam Liya To...
2006	Purani Jeans (Remixes)
2007	Jaanay Do
2009	Stop and Think ...?
2009	Moula Dil Badal Dey
2010	Shor Hai Mehshar Ka
2011	Kee Jana Main Kaun (written by the 18th century Sufi poet Bulleh Shah)
2012	Asgharam Aei Noor
2012	Main Hoon Ghlulam-e-Ali
2012	Ya Mustafa Ya Mustafa
2013	Bachpan Ki Badami Yadein
2013	Jaanay Do
2013	Salam Arz-e-Karbala
2014	Purani Jeans 2
2014	Yaad-E-Muhammad
2014	Pyason Ki Yaad
2017	Kee Jana Main Kaun, Vol. 01
2018	Yareman

Compilation albums

- The Best of Ali Haider

== Filmography ==
Film

Year	Title	Role
2002	Chalo Ishq Larain	

Television series

Year	Title	Role	Channel	Ref
1995	Tum Se Kehna Tha	Bilal	PTV	
2012	Faslay Hain Darmiyan		TV One	
2013	Ek Aur Ek Dhai		ARY Digital	

Telefilm

Year	Title	Role	Channel	Ref
1995	Chand Sa Mukhra		PTV	

== See also ==
- List of Pakistani musicians
- List of Pakistani actors
