= Zeba Bakhtiar =

Pakistani actress

Zeba Bakhtiar زيبا بختيار
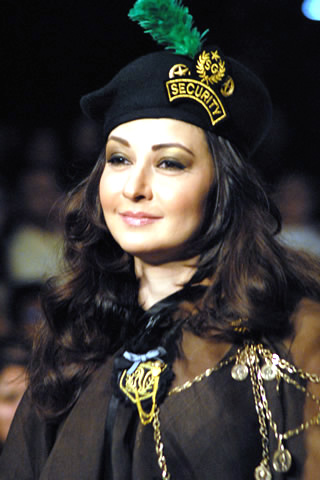
- Born: 5 November 1962 (age 63); Quetta, Pakistan
- Occupations: Actress; producer; director
- Years active: 1988 - present
- Known for: Henna (1991); Sargam (1995)
- Spouse(s): Salman Valliani (m. 1985; div. 1986) Jaaved Jaaferi (m. 1989; div. 1990) Adnan Sami (m. 1993; div. 1997) Sohail Khan Leghari (m. 2009; div. 2010)
- Children: Azaan Sami Khan (son)
- Parent: Yahya Bakhtiar (father)
- Relatives: Sultana Zafar (aunt); Huma Akbar (sister-in-law); Ali Haider (cousin)

Zeba Bakhtiar (Urdu: زيبا بختيار; born 5 November 1965) is a Pakistani film and television actress, producer and director. She is known for her roles in the historical television drama Anarkali (1988), the Bollywood romantic drama Henna (1991), and the Lollywood musical-romance, Sargam (1995). She produced and directed film Babu in 2001. For her performance in Sargam, she won the Nigar Award for Best Actress in 1995.

== Early life and family ==
Zeba is the daughter of Yahya Bakhtiar, a lawyer, politician and pre-independence Muslim League activist who served as the Attorney General of Pakistan, and also played a key role in framing Pakistan's current constitution. Her father belonged to Quetta, while her mother was an English woman born to Hungarian parents. Her father died in 2003, and her mother died in 2011. Her parents met in the UK in the early 1940s and married, with her mother eventually settling in Pakistan in 1949 after graduating from the University College London. Zeba has two brothers, Salim and Karim, who are both doctors, and a sister, Saira. She was raised in Quetta, and moved to Karachi later.

== Career ==
Bakhtiar made her television debut with a Pakistan Television the period-drama, Anarkali in 1988. Her melancholic romantic role in the series was widely appreciated. Bakhtiar was then offered the lead role in Raj Kapoor's film Henna, on Haseena Moin's recommendation after Shehnaz Sheikh and Salma Agha didn't work out. She played Henna, a compassionate rural Kashmiri in the film. Upon its release in 1991, the film emerged as a major critical and commercial success. For her performance, Bakhtiar received the nominations of Best Actress and Best Female Debut at the 37th Filmfare Awards.

Bakhtiar's second film, Nargis, directed and produced by Khalid Mohamed, was completed in 1992 but remained unreleased until 2019 when the lab dues were cleared. Later, she worked in more Bollywood films like Mohabbat Ki Arzoo (1994), Stuntman (1994), Jai Vikraanta (1995), and Muqadama (1996). But her career in Bollywood didn't make any progress after Henna. Then she came back to Pakistan and worked in the Syed Noor-directed film Sargam (1995). Her other Lollywood films include Chief Sahib (1996), Qaid (1996), and Musalman (2001). She produced and directed film Babu in 2001, and in 2014, she produced the spy thriller film O21.

After the big screen, Bakhtiar also appeared in television productions like Tansan, Laag, Abke Hum Bichre tau Shayad and Pehli See Mohabbat.

== Personal life ==
=== Marriages ===
Bakhtiar married four times. Her first husband was Salman Valliani whom she married in the year 1985 and divorced in 1986. Zeba married Indian actor Jaaved Jaaferi in 1989 and divorced in 1990. She came in the limelight because of her marriage to singer and music composer Adnan Sami. Zeba and Adnan got divorced in 1997. They have a son named Azaan Sami Khan. Later she married Sohail Khan Leghari in 2009 but the couple divorced in 2010.

=== Health ===
Zeba was diagnosed with diabetes before her second marriage. She now participates in the diabetes awareness campaigns on various forums.

== Social work ==
She is involved in women's association football in Pakistan as chairwoman of Karachi-based Diya W.F.C.

== Filmography ==
=== Film ===
All films are in Urdu unless otherwise noted.

| Year | Film | Role | Notes |
|---|---|---|---|
| 1991 | Henna | Henna | Hindi |
| 1993 | Nargis | Nargis | Hindi |
| 1994 | Mohabbat Ki Aarzoo | Poonam Singh | Hindi |
| 1994 | Stuntman | Reena B. Tiwari | Hindi |
| 1995 | Jai Vikraanta | Nirmala Verma | Hindi |
| 1995 | Munda Bigra Jaey | | |
| 1995 | Sargam | Zeb-un-Nisa | |
| 1996 | Muqadama | Chanchal Singh | Hindi |
| 1996 | Chief Sahib | | |
| 1999 | Qaid | Khushboo | |
| 2001 | Babu | | |
| 2001 | Musalmaan | Gul | |
| 2008 | The Weeping Queen | Mother Earth | |
| 2014 | O21 | —N/a | Producer |
| 2015 | Bin Roye | Maliha Shafiq | |

=== Television ===
| Year | Title | Role | Notes |
|---|---|---|---|
| 1988 | Anarkali | Anarkali | |
| | Tansen | | |
| 1998–2000 | Laag | Bisaal Indaraabi | |
| | Aabla Paa | | |
| | Kharaash | | |
| 1996 | Muqaddas | | |
| | Be Imaan | | |
| | Takoune | | |
| | Doordesh | | |
| | Aye Mere Pyar Ki Khushboo | | |
| | Ishq Ki Ibtida | | |
| 2000 | Ab Key Hum Bichre Tau Shayad | | |
| 2001 | Pehli See Mohabbat | Sofia | |
| 2005 | Masoori | | Director |
| 2005 | Maa Aur Mamta | Anoushey | Episode "Muskaan" |
| 2009 | Mehman | —N/a | Director & producer only |
| 2009 | Mulaqat | Rabi | Director and producer |
| 2010 | Moum | | |
| 2012 | Main Baba Ki Ladli | | Producer also |
| 2012 | Samjhauta Express | Shaista | |
| 2012 | Hazaron Saal | Zeba | |
| 2012 | Shehr-e-Dil Ke Darwaze | | |
| 2016–17 | Bin Roye | Maliha Shafiq | |

== Accolades ==
| Year | Ceremony | Category | Work | Result | Ref(s). |
|---|---|---|---|---|---|
| 1992 | Filmfare Awards | Best Actress | Henaa | Nominated | |
| 1992 | Filmfare Awards | Best Female Debut | Henaa | Nominated | |
| 1995 | Nigar Awards | Best Actress | Sargam | Won | |
| 2004 | Lux Style Awards | Chairperson's Lifetime Achievement Award | for contributions to Pakistani entertainment industry | Won | |
| 2006 | Lux Style Awards | Best TV Director (Terrestrial) | Masoori | Nominated | |
| 2015 | Lux Style Awards | Best Film | O21 | Nominated | |

== See also ==
- List of Pakistani actresses
