= Huma Akbar =

Pakistani actress

- Born: 23 October 1960 (age 65); Karachi, Sindh, Pakistan
- Education: University of Karachi
- Occupation: Actress
- Years active: 1980–2012
- Spouse: Karim Bakhtiar (m. 1986)
- Children: 2
- Relatives: Yahya Bakhtiar (father-in-law); Zeba Bakhtiar (sister-in-law); Sultana Zafar (aunt); Azaan Sami Khan (nephew); Ali Haider (cousin)

Huma Akbar is a Pakistani actress, who was one of the country's most popular and successful actresses in the 1980s and 1990s. She appeared in PTV productions like Khaleej, Shaheen, Choti Choti Baatein and received a nomination for Best Actress at the 6th PTV Awards for her performance in Karawaan.

== Early life ==
She was born in Karachi, in Pakistan's Sindh province and completed her education from the University of Karachi. Huma's parents got divorced when she was very young and her mother Akhtar Jahan Begum was a principal in a school. Later her mother married Akbar Ali.

Huma's father Jamal Ali Hashmi, also known as Jameel, was a leading film actor in Pakistan during the 1960s and 1970s. He acted in films Saza (1969), Gharnata (1971) and Yeh Aman (1971). Later he moved to India where he worked in some Hindi Cinema films.

She is the older half-sister of Indian actresses Tabu and Farah, both popular actresses in Bollywood and Hindi Cinema.

== Career ==
She made her debut as an actress in 1980 in the historical drama Shaheen. She then appeared in an episode of the series Nishan-e-Haider, based on true events of Rashid Minhas in which she portrayed the role of his younger sister Rukhsana.

In 1985, she acted in the drama Choti Choti Baatein alongside Asif Raza Mir and Begum Khurshid Mirza which written by Haseena Moin. In the same year, she depicted Sukhaan in the biographical-drama Karawaan, based on the life of Sindhi folk singer Fozia Soomro. For her performance, Akbar was nominated for Best Actress at the 6th ceremony of PTV Awards.

In 1986, Akbar portrayed a star-crossed lover with an affluent background in the drama Khaleej opposite Jahanzeb Gurchani. She next appeared in Yeh Kahaan Ki Dosti Hai with Rahat Kazmi and Zaheen Tahira which was written by Anwar Maqsood.

In 1990, she played a college student from an underprivileged family in the drama Badaltay Qalib opposite Sajid Hasan.

In 2012, she returned to television with the romance-drama Mata-e-Jaan Hai Tu on Hum TV, portraying the protagonist's mother. It was based on the eponymous novel by Farhat Ishtiaq and directed by Mehreen Jabbar.

== Personal life ==
Huma married Karim Bakhtiar, son of the lawyer and politician Yahya Bakhtiar. She worked with him in the PTV drama Khaleej. Karim is a doctor based in the United States and brother of actress Zeba Bakhtiar. Huma and Karim later moved to the United States. They have two children. Huma's aunt Sultana Zafar was also an actress.

== Filmography ==
=== Television ===
Year	Title	Role	Network
1980	Shaheen	Angela	PTV
1982	Nishan-e-Haider	Rukhsana	PTV
1985	Choti Choti Baatein	Shehzadi	PTV
1985	Karawaan	Sukhaan	PTV
1986	Khaleej	Zonia	PTV
1988	Yeh Kahaan Ki Dosti Hai	Mehnaz	PTV
1990	Badaltay Qabil	Samina	PTV
2008	Brunch With Bushra Ansari	Herself	Geo News
2012	Mata-e-Jaan Hai Tu	Yasmeen	Hum TV

== Awards and nominations ==
Year	Award	Category	Result	Title	Ref.
1986	6th PTV Awards	Best Actress	Nominated	Karawaan	
