= Main Khayal Hoon Kisi Aur Ka =

Pakistani television series

- Official Title screen
- Genre: Serial drama; Romantic drama
- Written by: Shabana Ghulam Nabi
- Directed by: Emraan Kaleem Mallick
- Starring: Hareem Farooq; Ali Rehman Khan; Alamdar Hussain
- Country of origin: Pakistan
- Original language: Urdu
- No. of seasons: 1
- No. of episodes: 23

Production
- Producers: Syed Imran Raza Kazmi; Hareem Farooq; Arif Lakhani; Momina Duraid Productions
- Production location: Islamabad
- Camera setup: Single-camera setup
- Production company: IRK Films

Original release
- Network: Hum TV
- Release: 23 June – 5 December 2018

Related
- Khamoshi; Aangan

Main Khayal Hoon Kisi Aur Ka (Urdu: میں خیال ہوں کسی اور کا; lit: I am someone else's thought) is a Pakistani romantic drama serial, directed by Emraan Kaleem Mallick and written by Shabana Ghulam Nabi which started airing on Hum TV on 23 June 2018, replacing Khamoshi.

It stars Hareem Farooq and Ali Rehman Khan on their third on-screen appearance together after Diyar-e-Dil and Parchi and is produced by IRK Films.

== Plot ==
The story revolves around the sacrifice of love and a broken relationship.

== Cast ==
- Hareem Farooq as Dania Aziz
- Ali Rehman Khan as Zaryab Safdar
- Alamdar Hussain as Arman Safdar
- Rucksar Naaz as Sonia
- Sabina Ahmed as Anita
- Imran Farooq as Arsal
- Mahjabeen Ahsan
- Anjum Habibi as Aziz
- Zia Gurchani as Safdar
- Shahid Qayyum Mirza
- Rabia Saeed
- Zahra Kazmi
- Shahram Akram
- Jhalak

== Production ==
Speaking about her role Hareem told Instep and Images, "My character is that of a simple girl, Dania, who is in love with this man, Zaryab, but is forced into marriage. She is entangled in a lot of emotions and complications."

== See also ==
- List of programs broadcast by Hum TV
