= Zia Gurchani =

Pakistani television actor and writer

- ضیاء گورچانی
- Born: Quetta, Balochistan, Pakistan
- Occupations: Actor, writer
- Years active: 1999–present
- Relatives: Jahanzeb Gurchani (brother)

Zia Gurchani is a Pakistani television actor and writer. He used to host a children's programme on Radio Pakistan in the early 2000s. Zia was introduced to the showbiz industry by journalist Zafar Samdani. His television appearances include Aangan (2017), Yaqeen Ka Safar (2017), Alif Allah Aur Insaan (2017–18), Mah-e-Tamaam (2018), Nibah (2018), Romeo Weds Heer (2018–19), and Dil Kiya Karey (2019–present).

== Personal life ==
Gurchani was born and raised in Quetta, Balochistan. He is the brother of veteran actor Jahanzeb Gurchani who appeared in PTV Home's classic Urdu serials in the 1990s.

== Television ==
Year	Title	Role	Network
1986	Khaleej	Rizwan	PTV Home
	Husn-e-Jaana		PTV Home
	Betaab		Geo TV
2017	Yaqeen Ka Safar	Gaiti's father	Hum TV
2017	Alif Allah Aur Insaan		Hum TV
2017	Begangi		A-Plus TV
2017	Adhoora Bandhan	Junaid	Geo TV
2017–2018	Khaani	Khaani's lawyer against Mir Hadi	Geo TV
2017–2018	Aangan	Shafiq	ARY Digital
2018	Mah-e-Tamaam		Hum TV
2018	Naik Parveen	Sufiyan Sahib	Geo TV
2018	Nibah		ARY Digital
2018	Main Khayal Hoon Kisi Aur Ka	Safdar	Hum TV
2018	Khwabzaadi		TV One
2018	Mera Ghar Aur Ghardari	Akbar	Geo TV
2018–2019	Romeo Weds Heer	Dr. Raja	Geo TV
2019	Dil Kiya Karay	Armaan's father	Geo TV
2019	Zid	Aiman's father	Express TV
