= Tahira Wasti =

Pakistani actress

Tahira Wasti طاہرہ واسطی
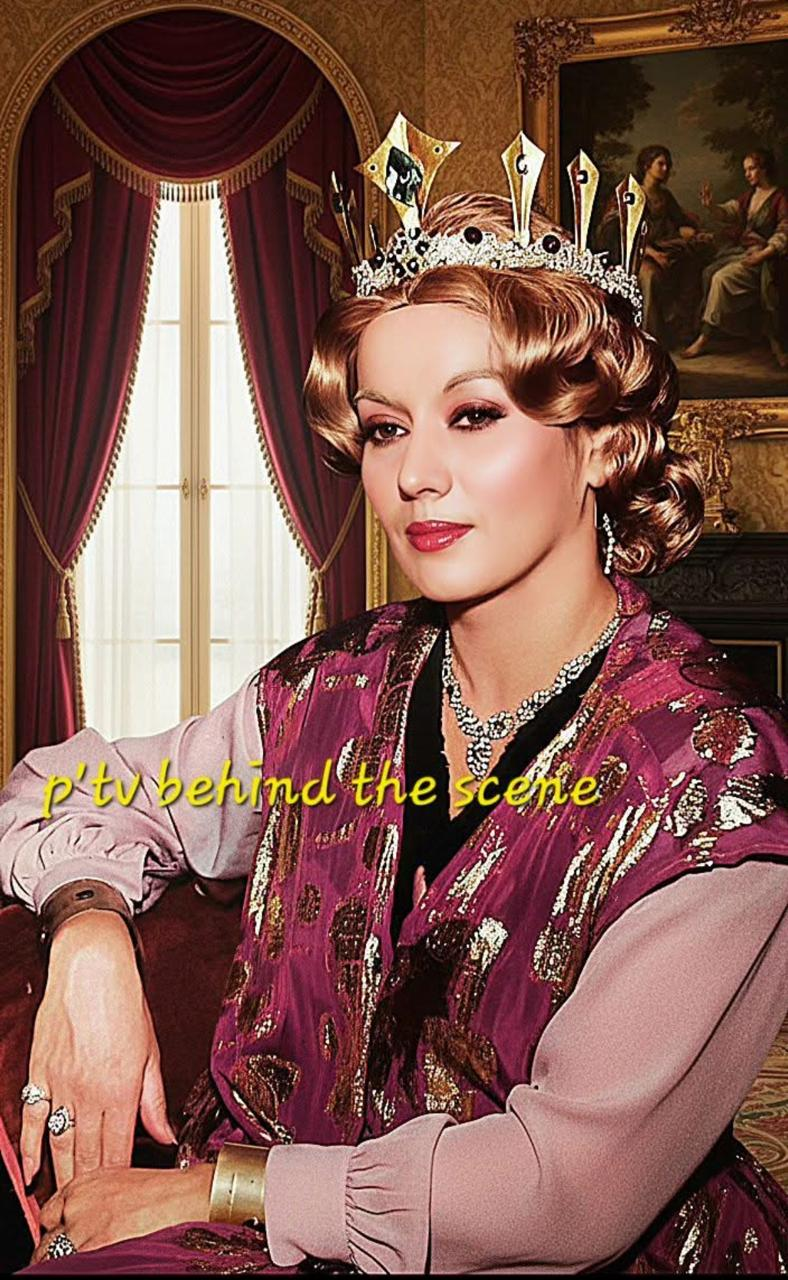
- Born: Tahira Bukhari; 1944; Khushab, Punjab, British India
- Died: 11 March 2012 (aged 67–68); Karachi, Pakistan
- Occupations: Actress; writer; newscaster
- Years active: 1964-2012
- Spouse: Rizwan Wasti (husband)
- Children: Laila Wasti (daughter); Rehan Wasti (son)
- Relatives: Maria Wasti (niece); Fahad Rehmani (son-in-law)

Tahira Wasti (Punjabi, Urdu: طاہرہ واسطی) (1944 – 11 March 2012) was a well-known Pakistani writer and television actress. She was one of the most popular Pakistani TV actresses of her time as well as one of the most successful actresses from the 1960s to the 1990s. She is best known for her portrayal of Isabella of Castile in the historical TV drama Shaheen.

== Early life ==
Tahira was born in 1944 in Khushab, Sargodha District of Punjab, (British India), now in Pakistan. She received her early education from Sargodha, and later moved to Lahore for higher education, then Karachi.

== Career ==
Tahira Wasti started her career with writing articles in a magazine at the age of 16, and also worked as an English newscaster on PTV News in 1964. Tahira started working as an actor in the 1968 Pakistan Television Corporation in 1968 drama serial Jaib Katra based on a novel by Saadat Hasan Manto. She appeared in a number of TV dramas from 1968 until the 1990s, most of them have become classics of PTV, such as Kashkol, Jaangloos, and Daldal. Her prominent personality made her famous for playing regal roles suitable for representing royal, feudal, or upper-class families, as in TV plays like Tipu Sultan: The Tiger Lord, Shaheen, and Aakhri Chatan.

She also wrote plays for television and showed a special interest in science fiction.

== Personal life ==
She was the wife of TV actor and English language newscaster Rizwan Wasti; they are the parents of TV actress Laila Wasti. Maria Wasti, a famous TV actress, is her niece.

== Illness and death ==
Tahira had developed heart ailments, diabetes and had been deeply affected by her husband's death in January 2011. She died of natural causes on 11 March 2012, in Karachi, at the age of 68.

== Filmography ==
=== Television series ===
Year	Title	Role	Notes
1980	Shaheen	Ra'ena	
1981	Afshan	Najmus Sehar	
1983	Shikayatain Hakayatain	Dr. Almas	
1984	Andhera Ujala	Nasir's mother	
1985	Guriya	Begum Waqar	
1985	Raat Gaye	Ahmed's mother	
1985	Aakhri Chatan	Malka-e-Bortai	
1986	Khaleej	Zonia's mother	
1987	Raat	Mariyam Bari	
1988	Flight 033	Passenger	
1989	Jangloos	Nasira	
1989	Pyas	Zainab	
1990	Fishaar	Bilqees Anees	
1991	Chotay Baray Log	Rubina	
1992	Nadan Nadia	Tahira	
1993	Kashkol	Salma	
1994	Daldal	Nadra Masood	
1995	Chand Grehan	Khanum	
1995	Pukaar	Malka-e-Helena	
1996	Awazain	Shireen Gul	
1996	Noori Jam Tamachi	Bela	
1996	Chand Sa Mukhra	Amir's mother	
1996	Fanooni Lateefay	Parveen	
1996	Heer Ranjha	Malki	
1997	Shanakht	Begum Waqar	
1998	Madan-e-Mohabbat	Begum Kahlil	
1998	Operation Dwarka 1965	Begum Commissioner	
1999	Barzakh	Begum Tanveer	
1999	Shaam Say Pehlay	Mehar-un-Nisa	
2000	Tipu Sultan	Rani Lakshra	
2000	Harjaee	Azra	
2004–05	Moorat	Reshma's mother	
2006	Damaad House	Gulnar	
2006	Dil, Diya, Dehleez	Mrs. Khan	
2007	Hyderabad Junction	Samina	
2008–09	Doraha	Samina	

=== Telefilm ===
- Operation Dwarka 1965
- Uss Ki Biwi (telefilm)
- Karwat

=== Film ===
- Kyun Tum Say Itna Pyar Hai

=== As a writer ===
- Kaali Deemak (Long play)
- Parsa (screenplay writer)
- Hazaron Saal (co-writer)
- Bheegi Palkain (writer)
- Waqt Ka Aasman

== Honour ==
In 2021 on 16 August the Government of Pakistan named a street and intersection after her in Lahore.

== Awards and nominations ==
Year	Award	Category	Result	Title	Ref.
2005	1st Indus Drama Awards	Best Writer	Nominated	Bheegi Palkain	
