= Shaheen (Pakistani TV series) =

- Title screen
- Genre: Historical; Islamic
- Based on: Shaeen by Naseem Hijazi
- Written by: Saleem Ahmad
- Country of origin: Pakistan
- Original language: Urdu

Original release
- Network: PTV
- Release: 1980 – 1980

Shaheen is a 1980 Pakistani historical and Islamic drama television series originally broadcast on PTV. The series was based on the novel of the same name by Naseem Hijazi and dramatised by Saleem Ahmad. Set in the 1490s Granada, the series entails the glorious past of the Muslims and revolves around their downfall in Andalus (present-day Spain).

== Premise ==
The series is set in the late 15th century Granada. The story recounts the glorious past of the Muslims in that region, the reasons for their downfall, and their endeavours for the integrity of their crumbling empire.

== Cast ==
- Ismael Shah as Badar Bin Mugheera
- Tahira Wasti as Isabella I of Castile
- Rashid Mehmood as King Ferdinand II of Aragon
- Shakeel as King Abu Abdullah
- Badar Khalil as Meerya
- Sultana Zafar as Khatoon Begum
- Huma Akbar as Angela
- Misbah Khalid as Abu Abdullah's mother
- Mazhar Ali as Bashir Bin Hassan
- Saleem Nasir
- Anwar Iqbal

== Reception ==
The historical events in the series were called as clear misrepresentation by the NCJP.
