= Frieha Altaf =

Pakistani actress

- Born: 21 September 1964 (age 61); Karachi, Pakistan
- Education: Barbizon Institute
- Occupations: Actress; Film director; Host; Human rights activist; Model; Producer
- Years active: 1982–present
- Children: Turhan James (son); Parisheh James (daughter)
- Parents: Altaf H Randhawa (father); Yasmeen Altaf (mother)
- Relatives: Neshmia Ahmed (sister)

Frieha Altaf is a Pakistani actress, former model, host, film director, producer and human rights activist. She is the CEO of Catwalk Event Management and Sahil which she founded in 1989. She has also worked in classic dramas Rozi and Kohar. Altaf has also made guest appearances in films Lahore Se Aagey, Wajood, Baaji and Parey Hut Love.

== Early life ==
She completed her education in US and returned to Pakistan in 1986. In Karachi, she worked as a painter and sculptor. During an exhibition, she was asked by a modeling agent to model for advertising and she agreed. Frieha's mother Yasmeen was a model in the 1960s.

Frieha also went to Canada where she studied fashion design while also teaching there at Barbizon Institute and got a diploma in fashion design.

== Career ==
Frieha started modeling at age 18 before going to the USA and she also did theater and stage plays. Frieha was paired with supermodel Atiya Khan for a jewellery shoot. In 1986, during the match between Pakistan versus India cricket cup in Sharjah, Frieha was sent abroad for a modelling show for Maheen Khan which was a success for Frieha. She also hosted Lux Style Ki Duniya on PTV in 1989. In 1990 she made her debut as an actress in Sahira Kazmi's directed long play Rozi as Shahana.

In 1991 she worked in Haseena Moin's drama Kohar as Neelam with Shakeel, Marina Khan and Fauzia Wahab.

In 2014 she introduced actress and model Areeba Habib to Pakistani fashion industry.

In 2022 Frieha launched her own podcast called FWhy Podcast in which she interviewed many actors and actresses such as Humayun Saeed, Imran Ashraf and Zara Noor Abbas.

== Personal life ==
She married thrice but her three marriages ended in divorce. She has two children from her third marriage and took custody of her children. Frieha's sister Neshmia Ahmed is a former model and the CEO of Grandeur Art Gallery.

In 2018 Frieha revealed in an interview with Nida Yasir and Farah that she was abused by her cook at the age of six when her parents were on vacation in Japan. She informed her mother about it when she returned from Japan, and the cook was later arrested. She said that it was a traumatizing experience for her and it affected her and her mother but later she recovered.

== Filmography ==
=== Television ===
Year	Title	Role	Network
1990	Rozi	Shahana	PTV
1991	Kohar	Neelam	PTV
2022	Stars and Style	Herself	PTV

=== Web series ===
Year	Title	Role	Network
2020	Churails	Botox Lady	ZEE5
2021	Dai	Dai	Urduflix

=== Film ===
Year	Title	Role
2016	Lahore Se Aagey	Herself
2018	Wajood	Mrs. Shafqat
2019	Baaji	Herself
2019	Parey Hut Love	Feroza

=== Music video ===
Year	Song	Singer(s)	Notes
2018	Kiya Darta Hai	Shehzad Roy	CATWALK

=== Host ===
Year	Title	Role	Network
1989	Lux Style Ki Duniya	Herself	PTV
2022	FWhy Podcast	Herself	Youtube

=== Other appearance ===
Year	Title	Role	Network
2018	Mein Nahi Hum	Herself	Hum News
2019	Ek Nayee Subah With Farah	Herself	A-Plus
2019	BOL Nights with Ahsan Khan	Herself	BOL Entertainment
2020	Good Morning Pakistan	Herself	ARY Digital
2022	G Sarkar	Herself	Neo News

== Ambassadorship ==
- Goodwill Ambassador for Sahil in 2018

== Awards and recognition ==
Year	Award	Category	Result	Title	Ref.
2018	17th Lux Style Awards	Lifetime Achievement Award	Won	Fashion	
2019	The Pakistan Leading Ladies Awards	Woman of the Year Award	Won	Herself	
2024	WOW Awards	Business of Fashion	Won	Outstanding Contribution to the Fashion Industry	
