= Laila Wasti =

Pakistani actress and director (born 1977)

- لیلیٰ واسطی
- Born: Syeda Saira Wasti; 3 June 1977 (age 49); Karachi, Sindh, Pakistan
- Education: University of California, Los Angeles
- Occupations: Actress; director
- Years active: 1992–present
- Spouse: Fahad Rehmani (m. 2008)
- Children: 1
- Parents: Rizwan Wasti (father); Tahira Wasti (mother)
- Relatives: Maria Wasti (cousin)

Laila Wasti (born 3 June 1977) is a Pakistani actress and director. She is known for her roles in television series such as Qurban, Hum Kahan Ke Sachay Thay, Sun Yaara and Dunk.

== Early life ==
Wasti was born on 3 June 1977 in Karachi, Pakistan. She completed her studies from Saint Joseph Convent, she graduated with English Literature. Then she went to the United States, studying at University of California, Los Angeles, where she did her masters in filmmaking. Laila's mother Tahira Wasti and father Rizwan Wasti were also actors.

== Career ==
Although initially uninterested to act in television productions, Wasti felt inclination towards it during her first project in the 1990s, PTV's Begum Haveli, a telefilm which was written by her mother Tahira Wasti. She was noted for her roles in PTV's productions such as Eaitraf, Pukaar, Saibaan, Operation Dwarka 1965, Heer Waris Shah and Eendhan. In 2000, she appeared in Badlon Par Basera as a Pakistani-US coping with a failed relationship. Wasti then returned to television after a hiatus of ten years, in television serials such as Sangsar in 2017, followed by Daldal and Qurban in the same year, and Teri Meri Kahani in the following year. In 2020, she portrayed a loving and doting maternal figure in Dil Ruba. In 2021, she played Mahira Khan's mother in Hum Kahan Ke Sachay Thay and Sajal Aly's mother in Ishq E Laa. In 2024, she portrayed a submissive wife of a ruthless tribal man in Khaie.

== Personal life ==
Wasti married Fahad on 27 December 2008. They have one child together. Shortly after her marriage, she was diagnosed with Leukemia. She went to U.S for the treatment, and after 6–7 years of painful treatment, she finally survived cancer. Wasti's father Rizwan Wasti died in 2011 and her mother Tahira Wasti died in 2012. She has two older brothers Rehan Wasti and Adnan Wasti. Her cousin Maria Wasti is also an actress.

== Filmography ==
=== Television ===
Year	Title	Role	Network
1993	Begum Haveli	Girl	PTV
1994	Eendhan	Noreen	PTV
1995	Kali Deemak	Shehla	PTV
1995	Hip Hip Hurrey Season 1	Herself	STN
1995	Pukaar	Princess of Leon	PTV
1995	Aawazain	Rabia	PTV
1996	Eaitraf	Rida	PTV
1996	Hip Hip Hurrey Season 2	Herself	STN
1996	Ilzam	Shahida Asif Ali	PTV
1996	Heer Ranjha	Heer	PTV
1997	Shanakht	Zara	PTV
1999	Saibaan	Mariam	PTV
2001	Badlon Par Basera	Deeba	PTV
2002	Neelma	Neelma	PTV
2014	Tum Bin	Salma	PTV
2016	Khwab Saraye	Farhat	Hum TV
2016	Ahsas	Sanobar	Urdu 1
2016	Kitni Girhain Baaki Hain (season 2)	Wafa	Hum TV
2017	Sun Yaara	Saima	ARY Digital
2017	Sangsar	Nadra	Hum TV
2017	Iltija	Adeela	ARY Digital
2017	Tere Bina	Shan's wife	Geo Entertainment
2017	Paimanay	Ayesha	Urdu 1
2017	Daldal	Rukhsana	Hum TV
2017	Qurban	Shehla	ARY Digital
2018	Teri Meri Kahani	Rabia	Hum TV
2018	Tum Mujrim Ho	Ghazala Zafar	Bol Entertainment
2018	Mazaaq Raat	Herself	Dunya News
2018	Ro Raha Hai Dil	Pinky	TV One
2018	Kabhi Band Kabhi Baja	Iffat	Express Entertainment
2019	Rani Nokrani	Ayesha	Express Entertainment
2019	Qismat Ka Likha	Aisha	Express Entertainment
2019	Bharam	Farah Burhan	Hum TV
2019	Makafaat	Erum	Geo Entertainment
2020	Tamanna	Zakiya	Geo TV
2020	Dil Ruba	Samiya	Hum TV
2020	Makafaat Season 2	Azra	Geo Entertainment
2020	Dunk	Saba	ARY Digital
2021	Azmaish	Almas	ARY Digital
2021	Oye Motti	Shela Idrees	Express Entertainment
2021	Sitam	Faryal	Hum TV
2021	Hum Kahan Ke Sachay Thay	Rabia	Hum TV
2021	Ishq E Laa	Shireen	Hum TV
2021	Bebaak	Nafisa	Hum TV
2022	Sirat-e-Mustaqeem Season 2	Shehla	ARY Digital
2022	Rasme-e-Ulfat	Rabia	PTV
2022	Kaisi Teri Khudgarzi	Naheed	ARY Digital
2022	Mushkil	Marium	Geo TV
2022	Ilzaam	Saima	Aan TV
2023	Mein Kahani Hun	Hiba	Express Entertainment
2023	Bojh	Dilshad	Geo Entertainment
2023	Working Women	Natasha Jahangir Elahi	Green Entertainment
2023	Sukoon	Abida	ARY Digital
2024	Khaie	Bareera	Geo Entertainment
2024	Kitni Girhain Baaki Hain	Mrs. Akmal Siddiqui	Hum TV
2024	Teray Janay Kay Baad	Arfa	ARY Digital
2024	BOL Kahani	Bushra	BOL Network
2025	Dastak	Anika	ARY Digital
2025	Behroopia	Tabinda Dilshad	Green Entertainment
2025	Rasm-e-Wafa	Mehreen	ARY Digital
2025	Biryani	Nighat	ARY Digital
2026	Humrahi	Mariyam	Geo TV

=== Web series ===
Year	Title	Role	Network
2023	Mor Chaal	Jameela	Vidly

=== Telefilm ===
Year	Title	Role
1996	Operation Dwarka 1965	Miss Erum
2002	Kuch Bhi Na Kaha	Abida
2019	Dastak	Romana
2019	In Se Miliye	Fiha
2021	Hangor S-131	Sameera's mother
2022	Mera Pehla Pyar	Amna
2025	Meri Uraan	Zehra

=== Film ===
Year	Title	Role	Notes
2021	Khel Khel Mein	Zara's mother	debut
2022	Ishrat Made in China	Nilofer	
2023	Babylicious	Mom	
2023	Teri Meri Kahaniyaan	Salman's mother	
2024	Daghabaaz Dil	Zoya's mother	

== Awards and nominations ==
Year	Award	Category	Result	Title	Ref.
1995	STN Awards	Best New Talent	Won	Hip Hip Hurrey Season 1	
1996	STN Awards	Best Talent	Won	Hip Hip Hurrey Season 2	
2017	Social Media Drama Awards	Best Supporting Actress	Nominated	Iltija	
