= Sheema Kermani =

Pakistani actress

- شیما کرمانی
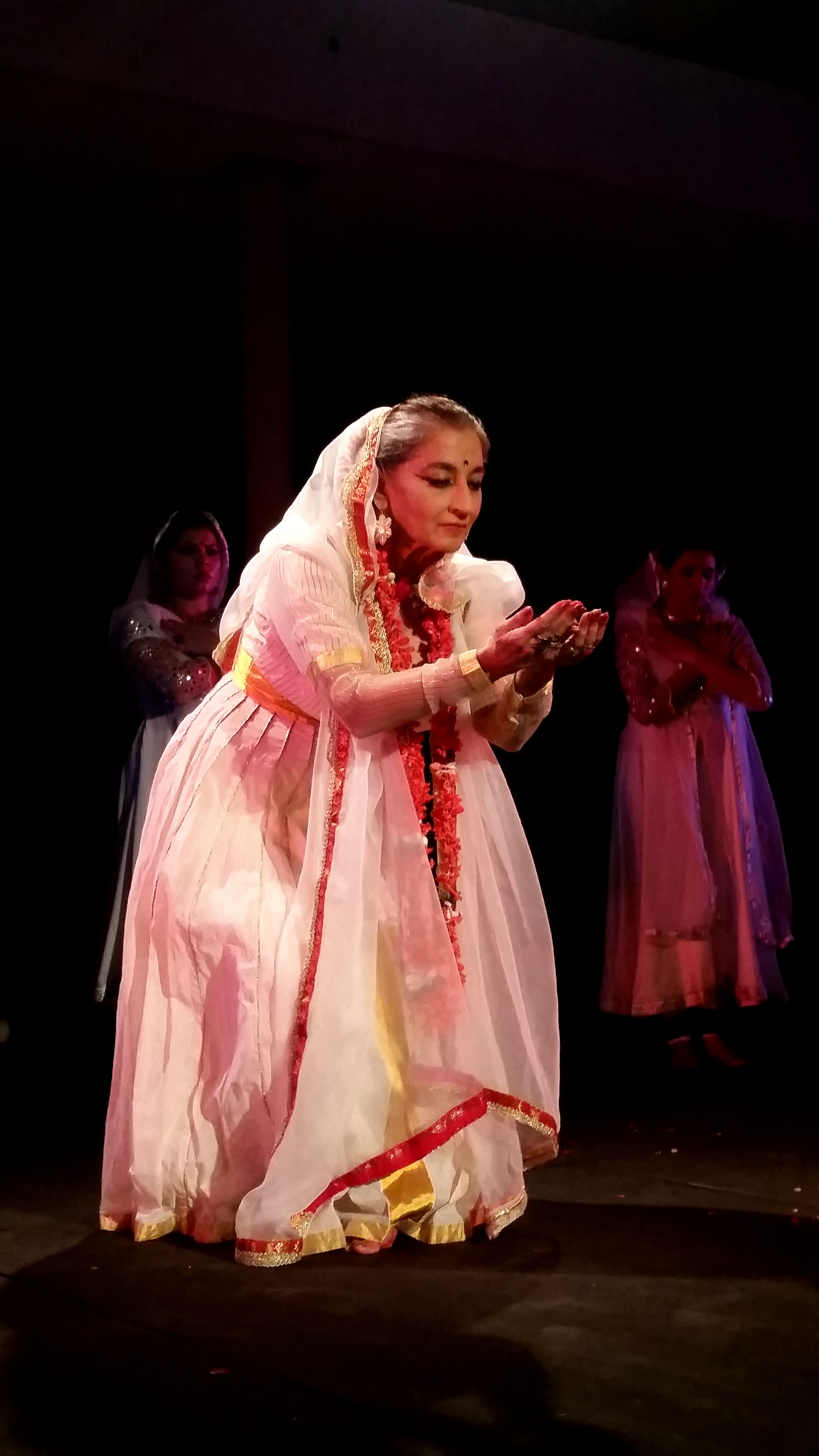
- Kermani performing at the Sufi Conference in Sindh
- Born: 16 January 1951 (age 75); Rawalpindi, Punjab, Pakistan
- Occupations: Classical dancer; social activist; theater director; actress
- Years active: 1959–present
- Spouse: Khalid Ahmed (husband)
- Relatives: Imtiaz Ali (nephew)
- Honours: Pride of Performance (2023)

Sheema Kermani (Urdu: شیما کرمانی; born 16 January 1951) is a Pakistani classical dancer, actress and social activist. She is the founder of Tehrik-e-Niswan Cultural Action Group (Women's Movement). She is also an exponent of Bharatanatyam dance. Kermani is known as a renowned classical dancer, choreographer, dance guru, theatre practitioner, performer, director, producer, and TV actor based in Karachi, Pakistan. She advocates on culture, women's rights, and peace issues.

Her pioneering contribution to the promotion of culture and theatrical performances in Pakistan since 1978 have led to international acclaim.

== Early life and education ==
Kermani was born on 16 January 1951 in Rawalpindi, Punjab, in a Muhajir family. Her parents migrated from India during the Partition of India. Her father served in the Pakistan Army, retiring as a brigadier and then being appointed as chairman of the Karachi Electric Supply Corporation. Her paternal family originates from the city of Lucknow and traces its ancestry to the city of Kerman in Iran, while her maternal side is from Hyderabad.

Kermani has two siblings, an elder brother and a younger sister. She received her education from Convent schools in different cities across Pakistan where her father was posted. During her school vacations, Kermani would visit her maternal grandparents who lived in India and it was there that she developed an interest in the performing arts.

== Career ==
When she was 8 years old, Kermani started to learn piano and Western classical music. From the age of 13, she began to learn classical Indian dance from Mr. and Mrs. Ghanshyam (a couple from Calcutta, who had set up a center for dance and music in Karachi). She later joined their institute as a member of the staff and performing troupe. Kermani was the only dancer in Pakistan throughout the years of General Zia-ul-Haq's martial law, when dance was banned and came to be seen as an activity highly disliked by the state and the clergy.

She received her early education from Presentation Convent Rawalpindi. After doing O-Level from Convent of Jesus and Mary, Karachi, she completed her A- Level from Karachi Grammar School and then proceeded to Croydon College of Art, London to study fine arts. She holds a degree of Bachelor of Arts from the University of the Punjab, Lahore, and a Masters and M. Phil Degree in History from University of Karachi, where she is presently enrolled for PhD.

Kermani started learning Bharatanatyam in the mid-1960s. Her first solo performance was in Pakistan in 1984. In 1988, she proceeded to India on an ICCR (Indian Council of Cultural Relations) scholarship and studied Bharatanatyam under Leela Samson, Kathak under Ram Mohan and Odissi under Guru Mayadhar Raut and Aloka Pannikar. She also conducts theater workshops under the guidance of theater director Prasanna Ramaswamy in Karachi and heads a cultural organization, Tehrik-e-Niswan in Karachi.

On 19 February 2017, Kermani appeared at the Shrine of Lal Shahbaz Qalandar in Sehwan after the barbaric suicide attack there and performed a dhamal (a Sufi dance form). She gave a passionate performance and told the media that nobody can stop music and dance.

She performed at the Faiz Aman Mela, Lahore to pay tribute to Asma Jahangir. She said we can bring peace, harmony and equality by loving each other and by sharing the message of love with each other.

In March 2019, Kermani gave a dance performance on Fehmida Riaz's poem "Aao Humwatno Raqs Karo" at the 10th Karachi Literature Festival.

In February 2022, she appeared in the music video for the song "Pasoori" as part of Season 14 of Coke Studio. This special performance was covered by the leading Indian print media, including ThePrint and The Indian Express.

== Personal life ==
Sheema is married to a theater actor Khalid Ahmed.

== Social activism ==
Kermani identifies as a feminist and Marxist. She realized that women in the Pakistani society were not able to get equality in the society so she started a movement called 'Tehrik-e-Niswan' (Women's Movement) and raised her voice for their rights, health issues, education and equality.

== Filmography ==
=== Television series ===
Year	Title	Role	Network
1986	Dastak	Shazia	PTV
1989	Aab O Saraab	Bahni	PTV
1990	Mai Jioungi Sar Utha Ke	Dadi	PTV
1991	Guzar Jayegi Raat	Aliya Begum	PTV
1992	Manzilein Aur Bhi	Fehmida	PTV
1994	Saibaan	Ayesha	PTV
1995	Chand Grehan	Ameer-ul-Nisa	STN
1996	Tum Meray Pass Raho	Shahnaz	STN
1997	Marvi	Safia Begum	PTV
1998	Raqs-e-Janaan	Lady	PTV
1999	Dhundalka	Party lady	PTV
2007	Khamoshi Jurm Hae	Guru	PTV
2008	Baitiyaan	Ubaida	PTV
2009	Saiqa	Old Najji	Hum TV

=== Telefilm ===
Year	Title	Role
2004	A Rented Child	Bee Bee Jee
2009	Mazloom	Bibi Ji

=== Film ===
Year	Title	Role
2010	Poshak	Madam
2024	The Queen of My Dreams	Dance Instructor
2025	Tum Sy Bulaya Na Gya	Sheema

== Tributes and recognition ==
- In year 2005, Kermani was selected by PeaceWomen Across the Globe as one of the most influential women of Pakistan, and was nominated for Nobel Peace Prize on her services and contributions for Bharatanatyam dance, as well as, for her pioneering contribution to the promotion of culture and theatrical performances in Pakistan.
- In 2012, Kermani received Women of Inspiration Award from Wonder Women Association on her struggle and devotion for well-being of Pakistani women and her passion for gender equality.
- In 2013, Kermani received ACHA Peace Star Award from Oregon-based Association for Communal Harmony in Asia (ACHA) on her life-long contributions for peace, communal harmony and women's rights activism, particularly in South Asia. The ceremony was held at the Arts Council of Pakistan Karachi, organized in cooperation with the Pakistan Peace Coalition and the Pakistan Institute of Labor Education and Research.
- In 2019, Taimur Rahim (a documentary film maker from Pakistan) made a short film (named: With Bells On Her Feet on the life) based on the life of Kermani. The documentary focused on the classical dancer's life and fight for social justice during Zia-ul-Haq's regime and it was released in South Asian Film Festival of Montreal (SAFFM). The film bagged two accolades – Best Short Film and the Audience Choice Award.
- In 2023 at 14 August she was honoured by the Government of Pakistan with the Pride of Performance for her contributions towards the social activist, theatre and television industry.
- In 2024 in February 26, she was honoured with Kashmir HUM Women Leaders Award by President Arif Alvi, recognizing decades of her tireless advocacy for art and her advocacy for women's rights.
- In 2024 at July 10, she was honoured with National Icon Award at 9th Icon of the Nation Award for her contributions towards the social activist and cinema industry.
