= Rozi (TV series) =

1990 Pakistani television long play

- روزی
- Genre: Comedy; Drama
- Based on: Tootsie by Sydney Pollack (film)
- Written by: Imran Aslam
- Directed by: Sahira Kazmi
- Starring: Moin Akhter; Fazila Kaiser; Arsh Muneer; Frieha Altaf
- Country of origin: Pakistan
- Original language: Urdu

Production
- Producer: Sahira Kazmi

Original release
- Network: PTV
- Release: 1990

Rozi (Urdu: روزی) is a 1990 Pakistani television long play written by Imran Aslam, under the pen name Imran Saleem, and produced and directed by Sahira Kazmi. The play was originally produced by Shalimar Television Network (STN) and broadcast on PTV. It is an Urdu adaptation of the 1982 American film Tootsie.

== Plot ==
Haroon (Moin Akhter), a struggling actor unable to find work in the Pakistani television industry, disguises himself as a woman named Rozi in order to secure employment. His ruse proves successful, but the disguise creates complications both in his professional life and in his personal relationships. Along the way, Haroon falls in love with Nazia (Fazila Kaiser) and comes to understand the difficulties that women face in the television industry.

== Cast ==
- Moin Akhter as Haroon / Rozi
- Fazila Kaiser as Nazia
- Frieha Altaf as Shahana
- Arsh Muneer as Bua Begum
- Latif Kapadia as Nasir
- Akbar Subhani as Rasheed
- Hameed Wain as Nazia's father
- Sultan Khan as Maqsood Khan
- Anjum Ahmed as Farzana
- Anwar Kamal as Interviewer
- Sami Aadil as Director
- Ahmed Khan as Advertising
- Abul Kalma as Autographer
- Aamir Akhtar as Haroon's friend
- Sajid Rafi as Haroon's friend
- Masood Zia as assistant director
- Ahmed Memon as Director

== Production ==
The long play was produced by Shalimar Television Network (STN) and subsequently broadcast on PTV. It was filmed in Karachi. Moin Akhter later stated that Sahira Kazmi cast him in the lead role and that he had not viewed Tootsie, the Hollywood film on which the play was based, prior to filming. The play has not been credited in its end titles as an adaptation of Tootsie, and no record of a formal licensing arrangement with Columbia Pictures, the film's distributor, has been identified.

== Legacy ==
Zahid Ahmed has stated that Moin Akhter's performance in *Rozi* informed his preparation for the role of Sameer/Sameera, a character with dissociative identity disorder, in the drama series Ishq Zahe Naseeb (2019).
