= Hazaron Saal =

Pakistani television series

- Title screen
- Original title: ہزاروں سال
- Written by: Tahira Wasti; Zanjabeel Asim Shah; Syeda Shehla Shakoor
- Directed by: Hisham Syed
- Starring: Zeba Bakhtiar; Mohib Mirza; Sajid Hasan; Shakeel; Arij Fatyma
- Country of origin: Pakistan
- Original language: Urdu
- No. of episodes: 18

Production
- Camera setup: Multi-camera
- Production company: Mastermind Productions

Original release
- Network: Geo TV
- Release: 27 February – 6 June 2012

Hazaron Saal (transl. Thousands of Years) is a Pakistani television series co-written by Tahira Wasti and Zanjabeel Asim Shah. It stars Zeba Bakhtiar and Mohib Mirza in the lead roles with Sajid Hasan, Shakeel and Arij Fatyma in the supporting cast. It premiered on Geo Entertainment on 27 February 2012.

== Plot ==
Tired of her hectic college routine, Zeba, a middle-aged college lecturer, goes to Murree on the advice of her doctor. There, she encounters Mohib, a struggling television writer who falls for her despite being many years younger to her. He expresses his feelings for her to which she warns him about her past.

However, his happiness vanishes as Zeba falls into a coma following an accident. To look after their comatose mother, Zeba's three daughters from her first marriage return from abroad. Despite the difficult circumstances, Mohib chooses to face them and is ready to wait for a thousand years for the recovery of her beloved. He develops good terms with Zeba's daughters, who are close to his age. His difficulties increase when Zeba's doctor and her ex-husband enter his life, complicating matters further.

== Cast ==
- Zeba Bakhtiar as Zeba
- Mohib Mirza as Mohib
- Sajid Hasan
- Shakeel
- Shamoon Abbasi
- Qaiser Naqvi
- Arij Fatyma
- Eshita Syed

== Soundtrack ==
The original soundtrack of the series "Kya Hath Laga Pathar Ban Kar" was sung by Sanam Marvi on the lyrics of Tariq Jameel, and music was composed by Ahsan Ali Taj.
