= Ishq E Laa =

Pakistani television series

- Genre: Romantic, social
- Written by: Qaisra Hayat
- Directed by: Amin Iqbal
- Starring: Yumna Zaidi; Azaan Sami Khan; Sajal Aly
- Theme music composer: Azaan Sami Khan
- Country of origin: Pakistan
- Original language: Urdu
- No. of episodes: 31

Production
- Executive producer: Momina Duraid
- Running time: 35-40 minutes
- Production company: MD Productions

Original release
- Network: Hum TV
- Release: 21 October 2021 – 2 June 2022

Ishq E Laa (Urdu: عشقِ لا, lit. 'Inevitable Love') is a Pakistani television drama series produced by Momina Duraid under her banner productions, written by Qaisra Hayat and directed by Amin Iqbal. The serial marks the acting debut of Azaan Sami Khan, with Sajal Aly and Yumna Zaidi in main roles. It was broadcast weekly on Hum TV from 21 October 2021 to 2 June 2022.

Ishq-e-Laa revolves around the spiritual journey of a young man where he ultimately finds divine.

== Plot ==
Shanaya is a dedicated and courageous television journalist who loves her job. As a staunch human rights activist, she often takes on dangerous assignments to expose social issues. She is in love with her childhood friend Azlan, who is a confident and hard-working businessman. Although the two of them are inseparable and have been best friends for years, he does not return her feelings. When a disheartened Shanaya begins to consider a marriage proposal from someone else, Azlan realises that he cannot afford to lose his best friend. He proposes to her, and they marry to the delight of their families. However, their marriage begins to fracture when he fails to understand her passion for social work. Azka is an ambitious student who aspires to be a doctor. She constantly receives unwanted attention from Abid, a young man of dubious morals. Due to misunderstandings caused by Azka's spiteful sister-in-law, Azka almost gets married off to Abid. However, she eventually comes to her senses and calls off the wedding. A businessman's son kills Sultan, Azka's brother. Shanaya helps Sultan's family fight the businessman, Arbab Haroon. Later, Arbab Haroon kills Shanaya to protect his son, destroying all the evidence against him. This tragedy leaves Azlan shattered, and he remains numb and lost for a long time. His parents help him to come to terms with the loss and move on. Later, Azlan brings justice to his wife. In the meantime, he also fulfils the promise made by Shanaya to fund Azka's medical college expenses.

=== 5 years later ===
Azka becomes a doctor. Zain, a friend from college, likes her, and she likes him too. However, Azlan's mother is ill and in need of a renal transplant, and Azka's kidney is a match. Under the law, only close relatives can be organ donors. To be able to voluntarily donate her kidney, she enters into a contract marriage with Azlan. Azlan thinks that Azka only donated her kidney to his mother for money, but she is actually a good daughter-in-law who only cares about her mother-in-law, not the money. Azlan then realises what a good person she is and apologises to her for being rude and arrogant. He also tells Azka how much he loves her, something he was unable to do with Shanaya before she died. The drama ends with Azlan going to Shanaya’s grave with Azka, while Professor Rehman talks about 'Ishq e Laa' (eternal love).

== Cast ==
=== Main ===
- Azaan Sami Khan as Azlan Ahmed : Ghiyas and Sitwat's son; Shanaya's widower; Azka's husband
- Sajal Aly as Shanaya Azlan Ahmed : Azlan's best friend turned first wife
- Yumna Zaidi as Dr. Azka Rahman : Azlan's second wife

=== Supporting ===
- Ghazala Kaifee as Sitwat Ghiyas Ahmad : Azlan's mother
- Zain Ullah as Makeel : Azlan’s old friend
- Uzma Hassan as Kanwal Sultan : Sultan's wife
- Seemi Raheel as Khadija Rahman : Azka's mother
- Ahmad Taha Ghani as Zain Ahmed : Mudassar and Munazzah's son; Zunaira's brother; Azka's class fellow
- Usman Peerzada as Ghiyas Ahmad : Azlan's father
- Sohail Sameer as Sultan Rahman : Azka's brother
- Adnan Samad Khan as Abid Ali : Kanwal's cousin
- Nargis Rasheed as Nusrat Ali : Abid's mother
- Laila Wasti as Shireen : Shanaya's mother
- Nadeem Baig as Prof. Rehman
- Moazzam Ali Khan as Arbab Haroon : a manipulative politician; Shanaya's murderer
- Mehroz Amin as Arslan Haroon : Haroon's son
- Samia Butt as Zunaira Ahmed : Zain's sister; Mudassar and Munzzah's daughter
- Khalid Butt as Mudassar Ahmed: Zain and Zunaira's father; Munazzah's husband
- Shaista Jabeen as Munazzah Ahmed : Zain and Zunaira's mother; Mudassar's wife
- Laila Zuberi as Mehnaz : Shireen's friend; Fahad's mother
- Arslan Asad Butt as Fahad : Mehnaz's son

== Soundtrack ==
"Saathiya"

Single by Azaan Sami Khan
- Language: Urdu
- Released: September 2021
- Length: 3:50
- Label: Hum
- Songwriter: Asim Raza
- Producer: MD Productions

External media

Audio
- Saathiya on JioSaavn
- Ibadaat on JioSaavn

Video
- Saathiya on YouTube
- Ibadat on YouTube

The official soundtrack of the series "Saathiya" was performed by Azaan Sami Khan who also composed the music, while the lyrics were written by Asim Raza. In January 2022, another soundtrack of the series "Ibadat" was released, which was also performed and composed by Khan who also co-wrote the lyrics with AM Turaz.

Track list
No.	Title	Singer(s)	Length
1.	"Saathiya"	Azaan Sami Khan	3:50
2.	"Ibadat"	Azaan Sami Khan	3:03

== Reception ==
=== Reception ===
The series mostly received positive reviews for its performances and script. On premiere, it received mixed reviews for storyline and execution. Critics praised the characters of Aly, Zaidi, Raheel and Hassan, in general the female portrayal.

=== Television ratings ===
Ep#	Broadcast date	TRP(s)
1	21 October 2021	5.5
4	18 November 2021	6.7
6	2 December 2021	7.2
9	23 December 2021	7.0
10	30 December 2021	7.0
12	13 January 2022	8.1
13	20 January 2022	7.0
14	27 January 2022	6.0
15	3 February 2022	6.4
24	7 April 2022	3.5
25	14 April 2022	5.6
26	21 April 2022	5.1
27	28 April 2022	4.7
29	19 May 2022	5.8

== Accolades ==
Year	Awards	Category	Nominee	Result	Ref.
2023	Lux Style Awards	Best TV Writer	Qaisra Hayat	Nominated	
2023	Lux Style Awards	Best Emerging Talent in TV	Azaan Sami Khan	Nominated	
