= 37th Filmfare Awards =

1992 awards for Hindi cinema

- Date: 1992

Highlights
- Best Film: Lamhe
- Critics Award for Best Film: Diksha
- Most awards: Lamhe (5)
- Most nominations: Lamhe (13)

The 37th Filmfare Awards for Hindi cinema were held in 1992.

Lamhe led the ceremony with 13 nominations, followed by Saajan with 11 nominations, Saudagar with 9 nominations, Henna with 8 nominations and Hum with 7 nominations.

Lamhe won 5 awards, including Best Film and Best Actress (for Sridevi), thus becoming the most-awarded film at the ceremony.

Anupam Kher was nominated twice for Best Supporting Actor for his performances in Lamhe and Saudagar, but lost to Danny Denzongpa who won the award for Sanam Bewafa.

== Main awards ==
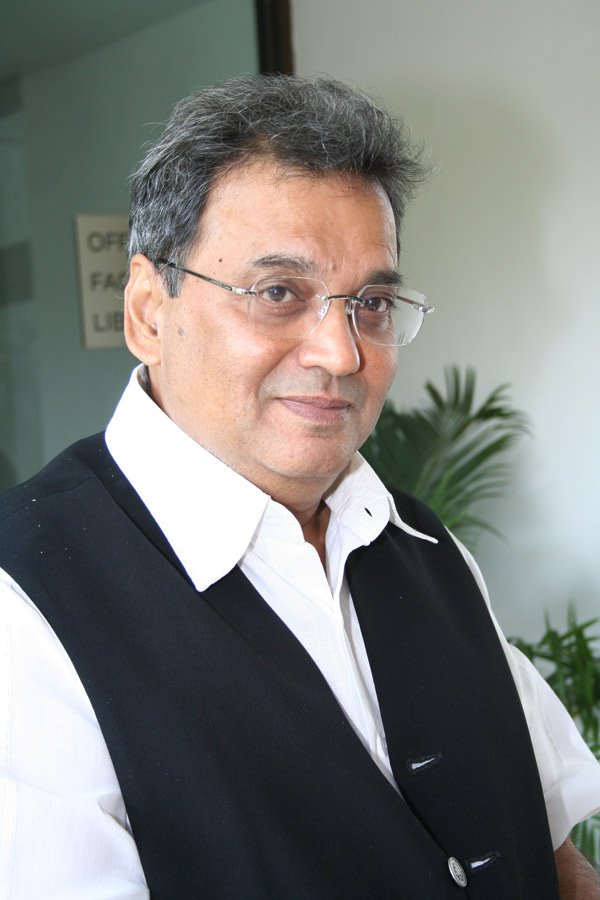
Subhash Ghai — Best Director winner for Saudagar

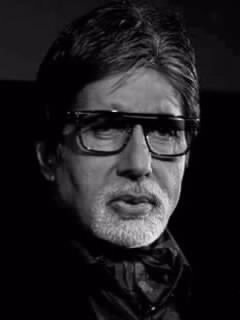
Amitabh Bachchan — Best Actor winner for Hum

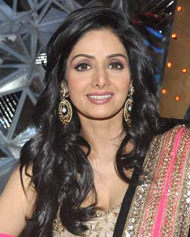
Sridevi — Best Actress winner for Lamhe

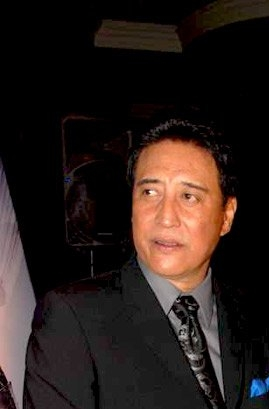
Danny Denzongpa — Best Supporting Actor winner for Sanam Bewafa

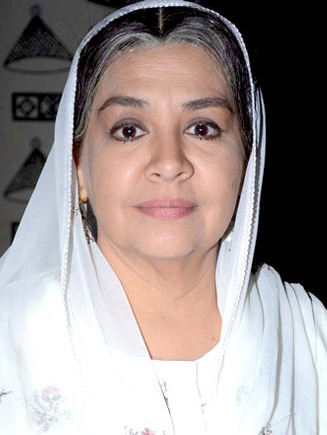
Farida Jalal — Best Supporting Actress winner for Henna

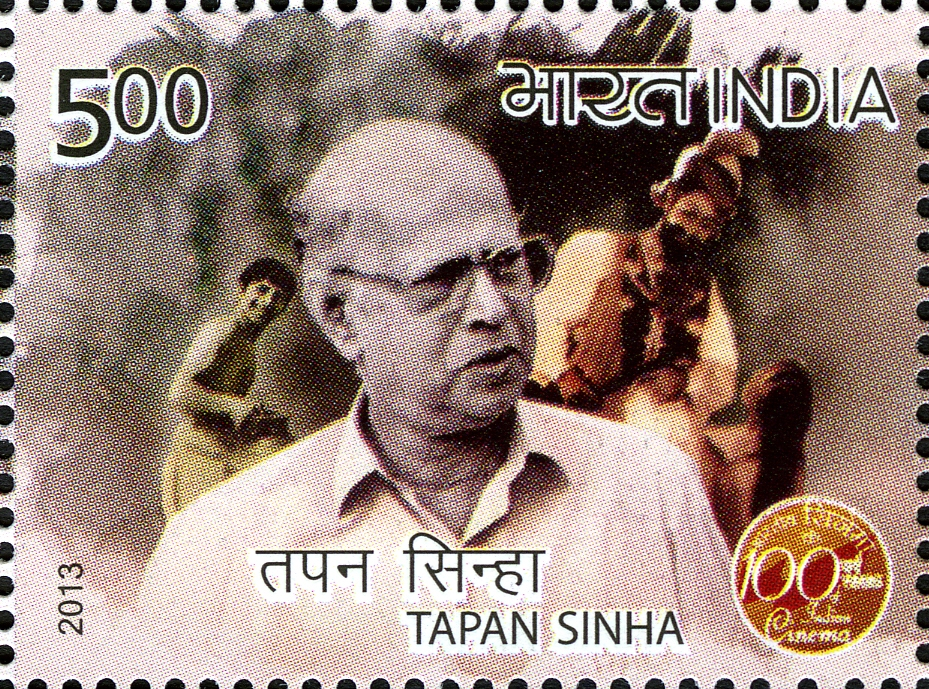
Tapan Sinha — Best Screenplay winner for Ek Doctor Ki Maut

=== Best Film ===
Lamhe

- Dil Hai Ke Manta Nahin
- Henna
- Saajan
- Saudagar

=== Best Director ===
Subhash Ghai – Saudagar

- Lawrence D'Souza – Saajan
- Mahesh Bhatt – Dil Hai Ke Manta Nahin
- Randhir Kapoor – Henna
- Yash Chopra – Lamhe

=== Best Actor ===
Amitabh Bachchan – Hum

- Aamir Khan – Dil Hai Ke Manta Nahin
- Anil Kapoor – Lamhe
- Dilip Kumar – Saudagar
- Sanjay Dutt – Saajan

=== Best Actress ===
Sridevi – Lamhe

- Dimple Kapadia – Lekin...
- Madhuri Dixit – Saajan
- Rekha – Phool Bane Angaray
- Zeba Bakhtiar – Henna

=== Best Supporting Actor ===
Danny Denzongpa – Sanam Bewafa

- Amrish Puri – Phool Aur Kaante
- Anupam Kher – Lamhe
- Anupam Kher – Saudagar
- Saeed Jaffrey – Henna

=== Best Supporting Actress ===
Farida Jalal – Henna

- Deepa Sahi – Hum
- Rama Vij – Prem Qaidi
- Waheeda Rehman – Lamhe

=== Best Comedian ===
Anupam Kher – Lamhe

- Anupam Kher – Dil Hai Ke Manta Nahin
- Kader Khan – Hum
- Laxmikant Berde – 100 Days

=== Best Villain ===
Sadashiv Amrapurkar – Sadak

- Amrish Puri – Saudagar
- Danny Denzongpa – Hum
- Om Puri – Narsimha

=== Best Music Director ===
Saajan – Nadeem-Shravan

- Lekin... – Hridaynath Mangeshkar
- Phool Aur Kaante – Nadeem-Shravan
- Saudagar – Laxmikant–Pyarelal

=== Best Lyricist ===
Lekin... – Gulzar for Yaara Seeli Seeli

- Dil Hai Ke Manta Nahin – Faaiz Anwar for Dil Hai Ke Manta Nahin
- Henna – Ravindra Jain for Main Hoon Khushrang
- Lamhe – Anand Bakshi for Kabhi Main Kahoon
- Saajan – Sameer for Mera Dil Bhi

=== Best Playback Singer, Male ===
Saajan – Kumar Sanu for Mera Dil Bhi

- Hum – Sudesh Bhosle for Jumma Chumma
- Lamhe – Hariharan for Kabhi Main Kahoon
- Saajan – Pankaj Udhas for Jiyen to Jiyen Kaise
- Saajan – S. P. Balasubramaniam for Tumse Milne Ki Tamanna Hai

=== Best Playback Singer, Female ===
Dil Hai Ke Manta Nahin – Anuradha Paudwal for Dil Hai Ke Manta Nahin

- Saajan – Alka Yagnik for Dekha Hai Pehli Baar
- Saajan – Anuradha Paudwal for Bohot Pyaar Karte Hain
- Saudagar – Kavita Krishnamurthy for Saudagar Sauda Kar

=== Best Debut ===
Ajay Devgn – Phool Aur Kaante

=== Lux New Face of the Year ===
Raveena Tandon – Patthar Ke Phool

=== Best Story ===
Lamhe – Honey Irani

- Disha – Sai Paranjpye
- Ek Doctor Ki Maut – Ramapada Choudhary
- Prahaar: The Final Attack – Nana Patekar and Sujit Sen

=== Best Screenplay ===
Ek Doctor Ki Maut – Tapan Sinha

=== Best Dialogue ===
Lamhe – Rahi Masoom Raza

=== Best Art Direction ===
Hum

=== Best Choreography ===
Hum – Chinni Prakash for "Jumma Chumma"

=== Best Cinematography ===
Henna

=== Best Editing ===
Saudagar

=== Best Sound ===
Patthar Ke Insaan

== Critics' awards ==
=== Best Film ===
Diksha

=== Best Documentary ===
Raam Ke Naam

=== Outstanding Performance ===
Dimple Kapadia – Drishti

== Biggest Winners ==
- Lamhe – 5/13
- Hum – 3/7
- Henna – 2/8
- Saudagar – 2/9
- Saajan – 2/11
