= Parey Hut Love =

2019 film by Asim Raza

- Urdu: پرے ہٹ لَو
- Directed by: Asim Raza
- Written by: Imran Aslam
- Screenplay by: Asim Raza; Nasir Aslam
- Produced by: Sheheryar Munawar; Shaiban Haq; Shahbaz Shigri; Mehrunisa Azhar
- Starring: Sheheryar Munawar; Maya Ali; Zara Noor Abbas; Ahmed Ali Butt
- Cinematography: Salman Razzak; Serkan Guller
- Edited by: Alam Azeemi
- Music by: Azaan Sami Khan
- Production company: The Vision Factory Films
- Distributed by: ARY Films; Salman Iqbal Films; B4U Motion Pictures
- Release date: 12 August 2019 (Eid al-Adha)
- Running time: 137 minutes
- Country: Pakistan
- Language: Urdu
- Box office: Rs. 30 crore (US$1.1 million)

Parey Hut Love (transl. Stay Away, Love) is a 2019 Pakistani romantic comedy film, directed by Asim Raza. Written by Imran Aslam, the story revolves around a young free-willed, commitment-phobic, aspiring actor Sheheryar (Sheheryar Munawar) and a strong-willed girl, Saniya (Maya Ali) and their romance as they meet and fall in love over a series of unplanned encounters at the weddings of their friends and family. Parey Hut Love also stars Nadeem Baig, Ahmed Ali Butt, Zara Noor Abbas and Shahbaz Shigri in prominent roles. The film also features a cameo by Mahira Khan and a special appearance by Fawad Khan. There are also cameos from Meera, Sonya Jehan and Ahmed Ali Akbar.

The music is directed by Azaan Sami Khan and the cinematography is by Serkan Güler and Salman Razzaq. The production designer is Hina Farooqui, art director is Saqib Hayat, and stylist is Haani Sharique. The film is loosely based on the 1994 British film Four Weddings and a Funeral. It was released internationally on 8 August 2019 and in Pakistan on Eid al-Azha, 12 August 2019, produced by The Vision Factory Films, and distributed by ARY Films, Salman Iqbal Films, and B4U Motion Pictures.

== Plot ==
The main plot is divided into four chapters

Chapter One: Natasha's wedding

The film starts with the preparations for Natasha's wedding going in full swing. A close cousin of Natasha, Shehryar Aziz is a struggling drama actor. His two friends are Arshad (an aspiring director) and Shabbo. Shehryar is a commitment-phobe and hates it when his mother, Farida, brings up the subject of getting him married.

At Natasha's wedding, he meets Natasha's cousin, Saniya who has come from Turkey. Shehryar is instantly smitten by her and he tries to flirt with her. At night, he takes Saniya to explore Karachi, the city of lights without informing anyone and the two fall in love. When Shehryar asks for her phone number, she jokes that given his nature, she would give him her phone number and then she would keep waiting for his calls and he would ignore her. She, nevertheless, gives him her number. Shehryar learns from Saniya that she will be leaving in two days and was in Pakistan to attend Natasha's wedding and to drop her father, Faisal (who is a famous writer) with his family members in his homeland just as he wished.

Saniya goes back to Turkey. Farida decides to join the drama industry just to 'pass time' which frustrates Shehryar immensely and in his frustration and his friends teasing him about Saniya, he ignores several calls and texts from her. As he is about to receive her call, he is mugged and Saniya comes to believe that Shehryar has used her.

Chapter Two: Rustom's Wedding

Faisal writes the script for a drama titled Parey Hut Love and informs Shehryar that he would be cast as the lead. Shehryar is overjoyed but has no one to finance the production of the film. Meanwhile, Farida makes it big in the industry and becomes famous. Rustom, a distant relative of Shehryar who is a Parsi proposes to Tanaaz, his cousin. Shehryar is elated to learn that Saniya has come for the wedding but is heartbroken when Saniya makes him meet her fiancé, Hassan. She deliberately attempts to make Shehryar jealous by openly praising Hassan.

The wedding takes place. Shehryar confronts Saniya after it and tells her that his phone was stolen. Saniya refuses to believe him and tells him that it is too late and that she will not leave Hassan at any cost.

Shehryar goes to several producers only to be repeatedly rejected for the script of Parey Hut Love. Shehryar's stepfather (who Shehryar calls 'Half Dad') finances the production. Shehryar for the first time calls him 'dad'.

The production of Parey Hut Love begins but Saniya arrives to inform Shehryar of Faisal's increasing brain tumor and gives him the card for her wedding which is to take place in Kashmir, Faisal's hometown. This leads to a major fight between Sheheryar and Arshad who is more focused on his project. Shehryar leaves for Kashmir. Arshad follows him and they reunite. Shehryar tells Saniya that his biological father did not love him at all, even though Shehryar loved him and left him and his mother. Thus, he became a commitment phobe.

Chapter Three: Saniya's Wedding

Saniya's wedding comes up and Sheheryar falls into depression stemming from Saniya's rejection. Shehryar begs her to forgive him and marry him, and to leave Hassan but Saniya implies that she can't. Meanwhile, Faisal passes away. The wedding is immediately postponed and Faisal's funeral is arranged. Saniya leaves in misery, caused by her father's death and Shehryar's fierce love for her.

Chapter Four: Shehryar's wedding

A few years later, Shehryar is a successful actor and is engaged to megastar Zeena, who loves him. Shehryar also reciprocates her feelings but still loves Saniya. Saniya tells Hassan that she is in love with Shehryar and breaks her engagement with him. Hassan forgives her and they continue as friends. Saniya, having learned of Shehryar's wedding (which is to take place in Turkey) from media reports, arrives at the wedding and tells Shehryar that she left Hassan because she told him that she loved someone else. Shehryar's feelings for Saniya rekindle. Zeena realizes Shehryar loves Saniya and not her, after seeing Saniya leave his room. At the wedding, Zeena motivates Shehryar to go after Saniya who was leaving for another city. Shehryar goes after her. Arshad and Shabbo express their liking for each other. Shehryar finds Saniya and tells her that he left Zeena because she found out that he loved someone else. The movie ends on a happy note with Shehryar and Saniya embracing each other.

== Cast ==
- Sheheryar Munawar as Sheheryar Aziz
- Maya Ali as Saniya Faisal
- Ahmed Ali Butt as Arshad
- Zara Noor Abbas as Shabbo
- Nadeem Baig as Faisal Abbas
- Hina Dilpazeer as Farida
- Durdana Butt as Amma Jaan
- Shahbaz Shigri as Hasan
- Munawar Alam Siddiqui as Aziz
- Rachel Viccaji as Tanaaz
- Faheem Azam as Rustom
- Yousuf Bashir Qureshi as Mahmud
- Frieha Altaf as Feroza
- Parisheh James as Natasha
- Jimmy Khan as Anwar

=== Cameo appearances ===
- Fawad Khan
- Mahira Khan as Zeena
- Marina Khan
- Sonya Jehan
- Imran Aslam
- Cybil Chowdhry
- Meera as Karishma Chaudhry
- Saife Hassan
- Mohammed Ehteshamuddin
- Supriya Shukla

== Production ==
=== Development ===
Pre-production of the film began in July 2018. Sheheryar Munawar, who was producing the film, wanted to cast Mahira Khan but due to date issues, she couldn't take the role. Maya Ali was later cast in the same role. Khan, however, made a cameo as Zeena in the film. The film was written by Imran Aslam.

=== Filming ===
Principal Photography took place in Karachi, Bahawalpur, and Muzaffarabad (Azad Kashmir). The second spell of film was shot in Istanbul, Turkey. The shoot concluded with a star-studded wrap up party in Karachi.

== Marketing and release ==
The official theatrical trailer of the film was launched on 21 June 2019 by ARY Digital. The trailer garnered 2.2 million views since its release on YouTube. Its song "Haye Dil Bechara" crossed a total of 10 million views on YouTube.

The film has been certified with a runtime of 137 minutes by the British Board of Film Classification and was released on Eid al-Adha, on 12 August 2019.

=== Home media ===
The World Television Premiere of the film was held by ARY Digital on Eid-ul-Adha, in August 2020.

=== Digital media ===
Parey Hut Love was made available on Amazon Prime Video for streaming.

== Reception ==
=== Critical reception ===
The film received generally positive reviews from audiences, with critics particularly praising its visual grandeur and music. In a review for Dawn Images, the film was described as "two hours of pure rom-com escapism in a beautiful, meticulously crafted world," though the reviewer noted that the showcase of wedding traditions served as an "aesthetic, exhibitionist sensory overload of excess" rather than driving the plot. The review highlighted Sheheryar Munawar's performance for showing refreshing vulnerability, while noting that Maya Ali's character, Saniya, appeared onscreen as "eager to please, palatable and non-threatening." Dawn's Icon review was highly enthusiastic, calling the film "a perfectly orchestrated piece of cinema" and praising director Asim Raza for "sweeping you off your feet" with his visual storytelling and handling of the film's emotional arcs.

The Express Tribune praised the film as "a spectacular visual treat," noting that "every frame of the film is visually astounding," but felt the story was "a little half-baked." In a review for The News International, the soundtrack was praised for focusing on quality over quantity, with Zeb Bangash's "Morey Saiyan" singled out as "the most beautiful song on the album." Audience reactions from American expats, as reported by the same publication, were largely positive, with viewers praising the "beautiful clothes," "colorful" sets, and the film's success in showcasing Pakistani weddings. Internationally, the film grossed $52,262, with $50,412 coming from the United Kingdom and $1,850 from Australia.

== Accolades ==
Year	Ceremony	Category	Recipient	Result
2020	1st Pakistan International Screen Awards	Best Film		Won
2020	1st Pakistan International Screen Awards	Best Director	Asim Raza	Won
2020	1st Pakistan International Screen Awards	Best Actor	Sheheryar Munawar	Won
2020	1st Pakistan International Screen Awards	Best Actress	Maya Ali	Nominated
2020	1st Pakistan International Screen Awards	Best Supporting Actor	Ahmad Ali Butt	Won
2020	1st Pakistan International Screen Awards	Best Supporting Actress	Zara Noor Abbas	Won
2020	1st Pakistan International Screen Awards	Best Song	Jimmy Khan	Nominated
2020	1st Pakistan International Screen Awards	Best Cinematography	Salman Razzak	Won
2020	1st Pakistan International Screen Awards	Best Music	Azaan Sami Khan and Saad Sultan	Nominated
2020	19th Lux Style Awards	Best Film		Nominated
2020	19th Lux Style Awards	Best Film Director	Asim Raza	Nominated
2020	19th Lux Style Awards	Best Film Actor	Sheheryar Munawar	Nominated
2020	19th Lux Style Awards	Best Film Actress	Maya Ali	Nominated
2020	19th Lux Style Awards	Best Playback Singer	Ali Tariq ("Behka Na")	Won

== Soundtrack ==
Parey Hut Love

Soundtrack album by Azaan Sami Khan
- Released: 10 July 2019
- Genres: Filmi Soundtrack; Qawwali
- Length: 26:46
- Language: Urdu

ARY Films chronology
Baaji (2019)	Parey Hut Love (2019)
External audio
- Audio jukebox on YouTube
- Album on SoundCloud

All music is composed by Azaan Sami khan.

No.	Title	Lyrics	Singer(s)	Length
1.	"Ik Pal"	Shakeel Sohail	Hadiqa Kiani, Harshdeep Kaur, Suhas Sawant	4:00
2.	"Haye Dil"	Asim Raza	Jimmy Khan	3:25
3.	"Behka Na"	Asim Raza	Ali Tariq, Harshdeep Kaur	4:23
4.	"Balma Bahgora"	Asim Raza, Ahmed Ali Butt	Aima Baig, Rap by Ahmed Ali Butt and Sheheryar Munawar	3:24
5.	"Morey Saiyan"	Asim Raza	Zeb Bangash	3:22
6.	"Zehal-e-Miskeen" (Original Composition by Nusrat Fateh Ali Khan)	Amir Khusrow	Rahat Fateh Ali Khan	8:08
Total length:				26:46

== See also ==
- List of Pakistani films of 2019
