= Yahya Bakhtiar =

Pakistani politician

Yahya Bakhtiar یٰحیٰی بختيار
- Born: 1921; Quetta, Balochistan, British India
- Died: 27 June 2003 (aged 81)
- Children: Zeba Bakhtiar (daughter)
- Relatives: Huma Akbar (daughter-in-law); Azaan Sami Khan (grandson); Sultana Zafar (cousin); Ali Haider (nephew)

Yahya Bakhtiar (Urdu: یحیی بختیار) was a Pakistani lawyer and politician who served as the Attorney General of Pakistan. Yahya was born in 1921 at Quetta, Balochistan, British India. Yahya Bakhtiar died on 27 June 2003, in Karachi, Sindh, Pakistan.

== Education ==
Yahya Bakhtiyar was born in a Pashtuns family of Mastung. Yahya Bakhtiar studied at schools in Quetta and Lahore. He studied Law in London and was called to the Bar in the United Kingdom. He became a member of the All-India Muslim League in 1941. He is buried in the graveyard of Killi Shekhan located in Mastung.

== Career ==
Yahya Bakhtiar, as the attorney general, played a key role in framing of the 1973 Constitution of Pakistan when he served in Prime Minister Zulfikar Ali Bhutto's cabinet. His biggest contribution was cross-examination of Mirza Nasir Ahmad, leader of the Ahmadiyya group in front of the parliament committee, who voluntarily appeared to record his party's point of view on the motion to declare Ahmadiyya as non-Muslim. This resulted in the Second Amendment to the Constitution of Pakistan, that became a part of the Constitution of Pakistan on 7 September 1974, under the Government of Prime Minister . It declared that Ahmadis were not Muslims. In 1974, he also joined the Pakistan Peoples Party after leaving the Council Muslim League. Yahya Bakhtiar became well known in Pakistan when he defended the former prime minister Zulfikar Ali Bhutto in court trial against the Zia-ul-Haq government starting on 24 October 1977, but Bhutto was sentenced to death on 18 March 1978 and then actually hanged on 4 April 1979. This hanging of a democratically elected prime minister was called a "judicial murder" by many people in Pakistan.

Bakhtiar was elected as a member of National Assembly of Pakistan from the Quetta-Pishin constituency in 1977. Yahya was also appointed to the Senate of Pakistan. He was appointed Attorney General of Pakistan again when Benazir Bhutto became prime minister in 1988. He also represented Nawaz Sharif in the Supreme Court of Pakistan when then president Ghulam Ishaq Khan dissolved the National Assembly by using his powers under Article 58(2)(B).

== Family and survivors ==
Yahya Bakhtiar was married to Eva Bakhtiar and had two sons and two daughters, including actress Zeba Bakhtiar.
