= Mehmaan =

Mehmaan (lit. 'guest') could refer to:

- Mehmaan khana, guest houses in India
- Mehmaan (film), a 1973 Indian film
- Sarkari Mehmaan, a 1979 Indian film

== See also ==
- Mehman (disambiguation)
