= Henna (film) =

1991 Indian film by Randhir Kapoor

- Original poster
- Directed by: Randhir Kapoor
- Written by: Khwaja Ahmad Abbas; Jainendra Jain; Hasina Moin; V. P. Sathe
- Produced by: Randhir Kapoor; Rajiv Kapoor
- Starring: Rishi Kapoor; Zeba Bakhtiar; Ashwini Bhave
- Narrated by: Shammi Kapoor
- Cinematography: Radhu Karmakar
- Edited by: Jethu Mundal
- Music by: Ravindra Jain
- Production company: R. K. Studios Chembur
- Distributed by: R. K. Films Ltd. Digital Entertainment; Eros Entertainment; His Master's Voice
- Release date: 28 June 1991
- Running time: 184 minutes
- Country: India
- Languages: Hindi; Urdu
- Budget: ₹4 crore
- Box office: ₹12 crore

Henna is a 1991 Indian musical romantic drama film written by Khwaja Ahmad Abbas, produced and directed by Randhir Kapoor. It stars Rishi Kapoor, along with Pakistani actress Zeba Bakhtiyar in the title role and Ashwini Bhave. The film was planned and started by director Raj Kapoor, but due to his death before the filming, it was shot by his eldest son Randhir. The dialogues of the film were written by the Pakistani writer Haseena Moin. The film was a major critical and commercial success and was also India's submission for the Academy Award for Best Foreign Language Film, but was not accepted as a nominee.

== Plot ==
Chandar Prakash (Rishi Kapoor), who lives in Srinagar, is due to be engaged and married to Chandni Kaul (Ashwini Bhave), whom he calls 'Chand'. On the day of the engagement, he meets with an accident and mistakenly strays into the Pakistani side of Kashmir. A native girl, Henna (Zeba Bakhtiar), falls in love with him; this is amidst the India-Pakistan tensions in Kashmir, which leads to him being suspected by the Pakistani police of being an Indian spy.

Beautiful Henna Khan lives a transient life near the river Jhelum, in Pakistan, with her widowed dad, Khan Baba, and three brothers, Ashraf, Razzak and Zaman. One day, she comes across an unconscious man who has washed ashore. Khan Baba, Gul Bibi (the village doctor) and Henna take this stranger in and nurse him back to health, only to find out that he has lost his memory. The man, in his sleep cries out the name "Chand!", thus everyone starts calling him by that name. Soon, he is well enough to walk around and starts working for Gul Bibi, helping her make clay pots. Henna falls in love and wishes to marry him, much to the chagrin of Daroga Shahbaaz Khan (Raza Murad), who has already been married twice; according to Shariat law, he can marry twice more. Khan Baba arranges the marriage of Henna and Chand; a day is set for the marriage. On the day of the wedding, Chand finally regains his memory. The family finds out that “Chand” is actually Chandar, and he is neither a Muslim nor Pakistani. He is from India, having strayed across the border into Pakistan after a car accident. The group decides to ensure a safe passage for Chand to get back home.

The first attempt is foiled, due to one of Henna’s brothers colluding with Shahbaaz Khan. The second attempt succeeds, but Henna ultimately loses her life in the chaos.

The film ends with Chandar asking why war must be.

== Cast ==
- Rishi Kapoor as Chandar Prakash / Chand
- Zeba Bakhtiar as Henna Khan
- Ashwini Bhave as Chandni Kaul
- Kulbhushan Kharbanda as Devraj Kaul
- Reema Lagoo as Anuradha Kaul
- Saeed Jaffrey as Khan Baba
- Farida Jalal as Bibi Gul
- Mohnish Behl as Captain Surendra
- Kiran Kumar as Ashraf
- Shafi Inamdar as Pak Police Superintendent Iqbal
- Dilip Dhawan as Razzaq
- Arun Verma as Zaman
- Arun Bakshi as Pak Police Constable Nawabdin
- Raza Murad as Pak Police Daroga Shahbaaz Khan

== Production ==
The Kashmir part of the film was shot in Manali, Himachal Pradesh. Some parts were shot in Pakistan (Murree, Islamabad), Switzerland and Austria.

== Soundtrack ==
Henna

Soundtrack album by Ravindra Jain
- Released: 1991
- Genre: Feature film soundtrack

The music was composed by Ravindra Jain and the lyrics were penned by Jain, Naqsh Lyallpuri and Maulana Qudsi. According to Box Office India, with around 22,00,000 units sold, this film's soundtrack was the year's sixth highest-selling album.

- "Main Hoon Khush Rang Henna" was listed at #7 on Binaca Geetmala annual list 1991.
- "Naar Daana Anar Daana" was listed at #20 on Binaca Geetmala annual list 1991.

#	Title	Singer(s)	Lyricist	Raga
1	"Main Hoon Khush Rang Henna" (Happy)	Lata Mangeshkar	Ravindra Jain	Bhairavi (Hindustani)
2	"Naar Daana Anar Daana"	Lata Mangeshkar	Ravindra Jain	
3	"Der Na Ho Jaye Kahin"	Lata Mangeshkar, Suresh Wadkar, Mohd. Sayeed, Farid Sabri, Satish	Ravindra Jain	Puriya Dhanashree
4	"Chitthiye Ni Dard Firaaq Valiye"	Lata Mangeshkar	Naqsh Lyallpuri	
5	"Marhaba Sayyedi"	Mohammed Aziz	Maulana Qudsi	
6	"Janewale O Janewale"	Lata Mangeshkar, Suresh Wadkar	Ravindra Jain	
7	"Bedardi Tere Pyar Ne"	Lata Mangeshkar	Ravindra Jain	
8	"Vash Malle"	Mohammed Aziz	Ravindra Jain	
9	"Main Hoon Khushrang Henna" (Sad)	Lata Mangeshkar, Mohammed Aziz	Ravindra Jain	Bhairavi (Hindustani)
10	"Main Der Karta Nahin"	Lata Mangeshkar, Suresh Wadkar	Ravindra Jain	

== Production ==
=== Casting ===
The lead role of Henna, before offering to Zeba it was first offered to Hina Durrani to be the lead heroine in Henna after Raj Kapoor met her in India during her visit with her mother Noor Jehan in 1982 but she refused. Later he asked Salma Agha to do the lead role in the film due to her busy schedule so she refused it. Then Kapoor wanted to cast Shehnaz Sheikh but she refused to work in the movie. So after her refusal Haseena Moin recommended Zeba Bakhtiar, thus Zeba was cast in the title role of Henna.

== Reception ==
Henna was a superhit, especially given the locations it was shot in, and for the excellent musical score by Ravindra Jain, which spawned internationally known hits such as "Main Hoon Khush Rang Henna", "Naar Daana Anar Daana" and "Der Na Ho Jaye Kahin".

Zeba Bakhtiar's performance in the title role was much acclaimed, garnering her a nomination under the Best Actress category at the 37th Filmfare Awards. She, alongside Salma Agha and Saba Qamar, is one of the only Pakistani actresses to be nominated at the Filmfare Awards. Farida Jalal's performance as Bibi Gul was also much appreciated; she won the Filmfare Award for Best Supporting Actress. The film also picked up several other nominations, including Best Film and Best Director.

The film marked the debut of actress Ashwini Bhave, who played one of the prominent roles in the story. She subsequently gained much popularity from the success of the film.

== Awards ==
37th Filmfare Awards

Won

- Best Supporting Actress – Farida Jalal
- Best Cinematography – Radhu Karmakar

Nominated

- Best Film – Randhir Kapoor, Rajiv Kapoor
- Best Director – Randhir Kapoor
- Best Actress – Zeba Bakhtiar
- Best Supporting Actor – Saeed Jaffrey
- Best Female Debut – Zeba Bakhtiar
- Best Lyricist – Ravindra Jain for "Main Hoon Khush Rang Henna"

== See also ==
- List of submissions to the 64th Academy Awards for Best Foreign Language Film
- List of Indian submissions for the Academy Award for Best Foreign Language Film
