= Stuntman (1994 film) =

Stunttman
- Directed by: Deepak Balraj Vij
- Screenplay by: Salim Hyder
- Story by: Deepak Balraj Vij
- Produced by: Poonam Sharma
- Starring: Jackie Shroff; Zeba Bakhtiar
- Cinematography: Kishore Kapadia
- Edited by: Vijay Parmar
- Music by: Nadeem-Shravan
- Release date: 21 October 1994
- Running time: 135 minutes
- Country: India
- Language: Hindi

Stunttman is a 1994 Indian Hindi language action film directed by Deepak Balraj Vij and produced by Poonam Sharma. The film stars Jackie Shroff, Zeba Bakhtiar in pivotal roles. It is mainly known for its famous song "Amma Dekh Tera Munda".

== Plot ==
Wealthy Reena falls in love with her brother's (Vijay) friend, Pune-based Bajrang Tiwari, a motorbike stuntman, much to the chagrin of her widowed mother. When Reena adamantly insists on marrying him, her mother attempts to talk Vijay and Bajrang to stop risking their lives as her husband, as well as Bajrang's dad had lost their respective lives living dangerously. She even wants Bajrang to live with her, but he refuses. The marriage takes place, and Reena re-locates to live in the slums with her husband. Shortly thereafter she gives birth to a daughter, Guddi. Then their lives are shattered after Vijay is killed, and evidence points to Bajrang. Reena leaves him and moves in with her mother and wants Guddi to also live with her. More surprises and shocks await her when she finds that Bajrang has absconded with Guddi and she may never see her child again.

== Cast ==
- Jackie Shroff as Bajrang Tiwari
- Zeba Bakhtiar as Reena Tiwari
- Satish Shah as Mastan
- Shakti Kapoor as Roop Kumar "Rocky"
- Tinu Anand as Prem Kumar
- Rita Bhaduri as Reena's Mother
- Sameer Chitre as Vijay
- Jack Gaud

== Soundtrack ==
Stuntman

Soundtrack album by Nadeem-Shravan
- Released: 1994
- Recorded: 1994
- Venue: Mumbai
- Studio: Sunny Super Sound
- Genre: Feature film soundtrack
- Length: 40:41
- Language: Hindi
- Label: Tips Cassettes & Records
- Producer: Nadeem-Shravan

Nadeem-Shravan chronology
Saajan Ka Ghar (1994)	Stuntman (1994)	Andolan (1995 film) (1995)

The music of the film was composed Nadeem-Shravan and the lyrics were penned by Sameer Anjaan. The 7-song soundtrack was released in 1994 on audio cassette, LP & CD in Tips Cassettes & Records Co. Music was very popular especially track "Yeh Aankhen Hai Aaina" sang by Kumar Sanu & Alka Yagnik. The full album was recorded by Kumar Sanu, Alka Yagnik and Sonu Nigam, Bali Brahmbhatt and Suhasini.

#	Title	Singer(s)
1.	"Yeh Aankhen Hai Aaina"	Kumar Sanu & Alka Yagnik
2.	"Aaj Mile Ho Kal Phir"	Kumar Sanu & Alka Yagnik
3.	"Aati Hai Teri Yaad Aati Hain"	Kumar Sanu & Alka Yagnik
4.	"Koi Dil Dukhaye Na Aise Kisika"	Sonu Nigam
5.	"Amma Dekh Tera Munda"	Bali Brahmbhatt & Alka Yagnik
6.	"Yeh Maine Soch Liya"	Kumar Sanu & Suhasini
7.	"Zindagi Kya Hai Ek Nagma"	Kumar Sanu & Alka Yagnik
