= Latif Kapadia Memorial Welfare Trust =

Pakistani nonprofit organization

- لطیف کپاڈیہ میموریل ویلفیئر ٹرسٹ
- Abbreviation: LKMWT
- Named after: Latif Kapadia
- Formation: 2007; 19 years ago
- Founded at: Karachi, Sindh, Pakistan
- Type: nonprofit foundation
- Legal status: Active
- Location: Karachi
- Region served: Sindh, Pakistan
- Chairman: Ahmed Kapadia
- Board of directors: Ahmed Kapadia, Sabir Sami
- Website: lkmwt.org

The Latif Kapadia Memorial Welfare Trust (LKMWT) is a nonprofit organization based in Karachi, Pakistan. Established in 2007, the trust was founded in memory of Latif Kapadia, an actor, to provide affordable healthcare services to underserved communities.

== History ==
The Latif Kapadia Memorial Welfare Trust was founded by the family of Latif Kapadia to honor his contributions to entertainment and social welfare. The trust focuses on improving healthcare accessibility by offering medical consultations, diagnostic services, and affordable medication for low-income individuals.

The current chairman of LKMWT is Ahmed Kapadia, who is also a trustee and the son of Latif Kapadia. Sabir Sami, a former CEO of KFC, serves as the vice chairman of the organization. The trust has collaborated with various organizations to expand its initiatives, including fundraising partnerships and digital payment integration to facilitate donations.

== Healthcare services and initiatives ==
LKMWT operates Medi-Health Clinics in Karachi, providing primary healthcare services, including diagnostics and subsidized medications. The clinics aim to cater to a significant number of patients annually, offering treatment at minimal cost.

In collaboration with The Hunar Foundation (THF), the trust conducts community health programs to educate people about the health risks associated with chewing tobacco. These programs are part of its broader awareness campaigns targeting preventable diseases.

== Awards ==
In 2024, LKMWT received the Black Dragon Award for Best Small Budget Campaign at the Dragons of Pakistan Awards, recognizing its efforts in healthcare outreach and community engagement.
