= Dastak (1986 TV series) =

Pakistani television series

- Title screen of Dastak
- دستک
- Genre: Drama
- Written by: Imran Aslam (credited as Imran Saleem)
- Directed by: Shahzad Khalil
- Starring: Ayaz Naik; Sheema Kermani; Salim Nasir; Zaheen Tahira
- Country of origin: Pakistan
- Original language: Urdu
- No. of seasons: 1
- No. of episodes: 6

Production
- Producer: Shahzad Khalil

Original release
- Network: PTV
- Release: 1986 – 1986

Dastak (Urdu: دستک, lit. 'Knock') is a 1986 Pakistani television drama series written by Imran Aslam, produced and directed by Shahzad Khalil. It aired on PTV.

== Plot ==
Dastak follows Rameez, who falls immediately in love with Reema, but faces conflict when his parents favour another woman, Shazia, as a prospective match.

== Cast ==
- Ayaz Naik as Rameez
- Sheema Kermani as Shazia
- Salim Nasir as Farooq
- Zaheen Tahira as Farooq's Wife
- Qazi Wajid as Akhtar
- Sultana Zafar as Akhtar's Mother
- Arshad Mehmood as Aman
- Shazia Akhtar as Reema
- Yasir Akhtar as Yasir
- Saleem Sheikh as Salman
- Wakeel Farooqi as Abid
- Sharafat Ali Shah as Asad
- Sidra Zaheer as Ayesha
