= Ayaz Naik =

Pakistani actor

- ایاز نائیک
- Born: 12 April 1966 (age 60); Lahore, Pakistan
- Education: University of Lahore
- Occupation: Actor
- Years active: 1970 – 2016
- Spouse: Shazia Akhtar (divorced)
- Parent(s): Naeem Naik (father); Zareena Naik (mother)
- Relatives: Beo Zafar (aunt); Yasir Akhtar (cousin); Rizwana Akhtar (aunt); Mehreen Jabbar (cousin); Kamal Jabber (cousin); Javed Jabbar (uncle); Shabnum Jabbar (aunt); Ejaz Naik (uncle)

Ayaz Naik, also known as Ayaz (Urdu;ایاز; born 1966) is a former Pakistani actor. He has acted in both Urdu and Punjabi films and also appeared in dramas Dastak, Sangchoor, Junoon and Chand Grehan.

== Career ==
Ayaz made his debut as a child actor in drama Ajnabi in 1970 and later appeared in Qurbatain Aur Faslay as Ghufran but his acting career actually began in film. Ayaz started his acting career in 1980, aged 14, when he did his first lead role in the film Nahin Abhi Nahin directed by Nazar-ul-Islam, starring with famous actress Shabnam and Faisal Rehman. The film did well at the box office and as a golden jubilee hit further boasted Ayaz's career.

In the 1980s Ayaz appeared in films Yeh Zamana Aur Hai, as well as Ek Doojay Kay Liye, starring alongside Babra Sharif in both, and Naam Mera Badnam in which he starred with Shabnam, Muhammad Ali, Kaveeta and Sangeeta.

In 1984 Ayaz starred in film Ishq Nachaway Gali Gali with Durdana Rehman. The film was a hit and he won a Nigar Award for Best Actor for his role.

Then Ayaz made his debut in a lead role in drama Dastak written by Haseena Moin and directed by Shahzad Khalil on PTV with Shazia Akhtar.

== Personal life ==
Ayaz married the model and actress Shazia Akhtar, who is also his cousin, with whom he has starred in drama Dastak. They married in the 1990s but divorced after a few years. Ayaz's father, Naeem Naik, was a civil servant in Islamabad but later he also did acting and he acted in drama Qurbatein Aur Fasley; his mother Zareena was also an actress. He is the cousin of Pakistani-British singer Yasir Akhtar and also of television director and producer Mehreen Jabbar. Ayaz's paternal uncle Ejaz Naik was a senior bureaucrat in the foreign ministry.

== Filmography ==
=== Film ===
Year	Film	Role	Language
1980	Nahin Abhi Nahin	Bobby	Urdu
1981	Yeh Zamana Aur Hai	Naeem	Urdu
1982	Aaina Aur Zindagi	Jimmy	Urdu
1982	Ek Din Bahu Ka	Rasheed	Urdu
1983	Ek Doojay Kay Liye	Ayaz	Urdu
1984	Naam Mera Badnam	Shehzad	Urdu
1984	Ishq Nachaway Gali Gali	Afzal	Punjabi
1985	Benazir Qurbani	Askar	Urdu
1985	Palkon Ki Chhaon Mein	Shiraz	Urdu
1987	Saas Meri Saheli	Imran	Urdu
1988	Pyar Tera Mera	Javed	Punjabi

=== Television series ===
Year	Title	Role	Network
1970	Ajnabi	Beta	PTV
1974	Qurbatain Aur Faslay	Young Ghufran	PTV
1986	Dastak	Rameez	PTV
1987	Aaap Ka Zamir	Himself	PTV
1989	Junoon	Rehman	PTV
1991	Sangchoor	Tauqeer	PTV
1994	Sarang	Ahmed	PTV
1995	Chand Grehan	Nasir	STN
1996	Hip Hip Hurrey	Himself	STN
1998	Haqeeqat	Sharjeel	PTV
2000	Kahan Se Kahan Tak	Haider	PTV

=== Telefilm ===
Year	Title	Role
1997	Kajal Such Much Pagal Ho Gai	Dr. Abdur Rauf

== Awards and recognition ==
Year	Award	Category	Result	Title	Ref.
1984	Nigar Award	Best Actor	Won	Ishq Nachaway Gali Gali	
1996	STN Awards	Best New Talent	Won	Hip Hip Hurrey	
