= Nahin Abhi Nahin =

1980 film

- Directed by: Nazar-ul-Islam
- Written by: Syed Noor
- Produced by: M. Aslam Naeem, Usman Okhai
- Starring: Shabnam; Faisal Rehman; Ayaz Naik; Arzoo; Naeema Garaj
- Music by: Robin Ghosh
- Release date: 7 November 1980
- Country: Pakistan
- Language: Urdu

Nahin Abhi Nahin (Urdu: نہیں ابھی نہیں) is a 1980 Pakistani romantic Urdu film directed by Nazar-ul-Islam.

The movie introduced the new actors Faisal, Ayaz Naik, and Arzoo. While the star actress Shabnam was in the lead role. Nahin Abhi Nahin was a golden jubilee hit of the year. The movie song, Saman wo Khawab Sa Saman, composed by Robin Ghosh and vocalized by Akhlaq Ahmed, became a very popular track. The film was based on 1971 American film Summer of '42.

== Plot ==
A teenage student, who is curious about sex and romance, misinterprets the affectionate gestures of an attractive lady and falls in love with her. Meanwhile, he meets another girl of his own age group and she starts liking him, but he continues to be obsessed with that older woman. The girl tries to convince him that it is a mismatch. But then, a naughty friend of his, encourages him to express his feelings to that lady. He actually does that. The angry lady scolds him for his cheap thoughts and makes it clear to him that she was kind to him only because he resembled her deceased younger brother. The ashamed and guilty teenager tries to commit suicide but is saved. Then the girl proposes to him to be her boyfriend but the boy has now learned his lesson. He refuses her offer by saying, "Our elders are right. Flowers that bloom before their time also die prematurely. I shall eat this fruit but ... no, not just yet (nahin abhi nahin).

== Cast ==
- Shabnam
- Faisal
- Ayaz Naik
- Arzoo
- Deeba
- Qavi
- Rangeela
- Mirza Shai
- Garaj Babu
- Naeema Garaj
- Ahmad Ali

Guest stars: Khalid Saleem Mota, Ilyas Kashmiri, Allauddin, Nanha, and Saqi

== Soundtrack ==
All music was composed by Robin Ghosh, film song lyrics by Suroor Barabankvi.

- Kuchh Bhi Karo Yeh Rokain, Koi Buzurgon Ko Samjhaye Koi Inhain Bhi Tokay
  Dunya Ke Sab Mazay Urra Kar, Kharrain Hain Raasta Rokay
- Samaan Woh Khawab Sa Samaan... Singer: Akhlaq Ahmed, Poet: Suroor Barabankvi
- Us Nay Dekha, Main Nay Dekha... Singer: Akhlaq Ahmed, Nayyara Noor
- Woh Waqt Tha Purana... Singer: A. Nayyar, Akhlaq Ahmed

== Reception and box office ==
The movie did well at the box office and became a golden jubilee hit. It completed 60 cumulative weeks in theaters. Cinema fans regarded Nahin Abhi Nahin as one of best romantic and musical Urdu films with an innovative story theme.

== Awards ==
Nahin Abhi Nahin won a Nigar award for the category of Special award for Faisal.

== Impact ==
The film launched the careers of actors Faisal, Ayaz Naik, and Arzoo. After the release of Nahin Abhi Nahin, Faisal and Arzoo also appeared together in the popular Naaz Paan Masala commercial.
