= Latif Kapadia =

Pakistani actor

- لطیف کپاڈیا
- Born: 27 March 1934; Nasik, Maharashtra, British India
- Died: 29 March 2002 (aged 68); Karachi, Sindh, Pakistan
- Occupation: Actor
- Years active: 1957–2002
- Children: 5, including Ahmed Hussain Kapadia

Latif Kapadia (Urdu: لطيف کپاڈیا) (27 March 1934 – 29 March 2002) was a Pakistani stage and television actor.

== Career ==
Born on 27 March 1934 in Nashik, a city in the Maharashtra state of British India, he was of Gujarati descent. His parents originated from Abrama village near Navsari, Gujarat. Latif Kapadia migrated to Karachi at the age of 13 with his family and started his career as a stage actor. In 1953, Kapadia began his acting career.

A few years later, Kapadia started acting with the Avant-Garde Arts Theatre. He then expanded to television plays with Pakistan Television in 1967. During his television career, Kapadia appeared in the following plays:

- Baarish
- Barzakh
- Karawaan
- Fifty Fifty
- Rozi
- Gurez
- Chand Grehan
- Nadan Nadia
- Shikastay Arzoo
- Dhoop Kinare

Kapadia appeared in the 1998 movie Very Good Dunya, Very Bad Log. He was fond of singing also and used to sing the songs of his friend, Ahmed Rushdi, who was a well known singer of the Pakistan film industry. Kapadia received the Pride of Performance in 2001.

== Death ==
On 29 March 29, 2002, Kapadia died from cardio-respiratory arrest, two days after his 68th birthday at age 68. Fellow actor Moin Akhter had earlier taken him to the Liaquat National Hospital for treatment. He was discharged after minor treatment. He later died at his home. Kapadia was married and had five children. He was buried in Karachi at Mewa Shah Graveyard.

== Latif Kapadia Memorial Welfare Trust ==
After his death, his family and friends established Latif Kapadia Memorial Welfare Trust, a non-profit organisation in 2007. The foundation focuses on making essential healthcare accessible for low-income communities.

== See also ==
- Pakistan Television Corporation
- List of Lollywood actors
