= Azaan Sami Khan =

Pakistani musician and actor (born 1993)

- Born: Azaan Sami Khan; 22 May 1993 (age 33); Karachi, Pakistan
- Education: Belmont University
- Occupations: Musician; Composer; Actor; Screenwriter; Editor
- Years active: 2014–present
- Spouse: Sophia Bilgrami (m. 2012; div. 2022)
- Children: 2
- Parents: Adnan Sami (father); Zeba Bakhtiar (mother)
- Relatives: Arshad Sami Khan (paternal grandfather); Yahya Bakhtiar (maternal grandfather); Huma Akbar (aunt); Sultana Zafar (aunt)

Azaan Sami Khan (born 22 May 1993) is a Pakistani musician, composer and actor. Additionally, he has also been a screenwriter and editor. He is best known as a film and television music composer, with credits on the Pakistani films Parwaaz Hai Junoon (2018), Parey Hut Love (2019) and Superstar (2019), and as a singer who released his debut album Main Tera in 2021. He made his television acting debut in 2021 with the Hum TV drama serial Ishq E Laa.

Khan is the son of musician Adnan Sami and actress Zeba Bakhtiar.

== Early life and education ==
Khan was born on 22 May 1993 in Karachi, Pakistan, the only child of musician Adnan Sami and actress Zeba Bakhtiar, who married earlier that year and divorced shortly afterwards. He was raised primarily by his mother in Pakistan and spent part of his teenage years in India with his father, who later acquired Indian citizenship. In interviews, Khan has said that he chose to base his career in Pakistan, describing the country as his home.

Due to his family background, Khan was exposed to the entertainment industry early on, attending production meetings while he was still eight and learning from his mother how to edit (as her production company was developing television series.)

Khan attended school in Karachi and went on to study at Belmont University in Nashville, Tennessee.

== Career ==
=== Cinema ===
Khan began his career in 2014 as co-writer and co-producer of the Pakistani action thriller O21, which was produced by his mother's production company.

He made his debut as a film music composer with Parwaaz Hai Junoon (2018), and went on to compose the soundtracks of the romantic comedy Parey Hut Love and the musical drama Superstar, both released in 2019. Tracks from these films, including "Haye Dil", "Noori" and "Ghalat Fehmi", were widely played in Pakistan. In 2019, he also worked as an assistant director on the Hindi film Kalank.

=== Music ===
Khan is classically trained and his primary performance instruments are the piano and the keyboard, while as a film music composer he arranges and orchestrates a vast array of acoustic, traditional subcontinental, and modern western instruments (such as guitars and eastern orchestral arrangements).

He released his debut album Main Tera in 2022. It was the first production of Hum Records, a record label and music platform launched by the Hum Network. The nine-track album included a collaboration with Rahat Fateh Ali Khan on the song "Meri Sajna Re"; the title track "Main Tera" passed five million YouTube views within a month of release. The same year he released the single "Tu" with actress Mahira Khan, and "Ik Lamha", featuring Maya Ali.

=== Television ===
Khan made his acting debut in the 2021 Hum TV drama serial Ishq E Laa, appearing alongside Sajal Aly and Yumna Zaidi in the role of Azlan Ahmad. He was nominated for Best Emerging Talent in Television at the 22nd Lux Style Awards in 2023 for the role. He went on to appear in the dramas Hum Dono and Meri Tanhai (both 2024–25), and in 2025 starred in Ae Dil and the ARY Digital serial Main Manto Nahi Hoon.

== Personal life ==
Khan married Sophia Bilgrami in 2012; the couple have two children, a son, Ibrahim, and a daughter, Lily. They divorced by mutual consent in 2022.

== Filmography ==
=== Films ===
Year	Title	Actor	Music composer	Producer	Screenwriter
2014	O21	No	No	Yes	Yes
2018	Parwaaz Hai Junoon	No	Yes	No	No
2019	Parey Hut Love	No	Yes	No	No
2019	Superstar	No	Yes	No	Yes
2025	U Turn Wala Love	Dani	No	No	No

=== Television ===
Year	Title	Role	Music composer	Network
2021	Hum Kahan Ke Sachay Thay	No	Yes	Hum TV
2021	Ishq E Laa	Azlan Ahmad	Yes	Hum TV
2023	Kuch Ankahi	No	Yes	ARY Digital
2024	Hum Dono	Asad	Yes	Hum TV
2024	Meri Tanhai	Khizer	Yes	Hum TV
2025	Ae Dil	Rohaam	Yes	ARY Digital
2025	Main Manto Nahi Hoon	Farhad Binyamin	No	ARY Digital

== Discography ==
Year	Album / single / soundtrack	Song
2021	Tu (featuring Mahira Khan)	"Tu"
2021	Tu Hai Mera	"Tu Hai Mera"
2021	Ik Lamha	"Ik Lamha"
2022	Ishq E Laa (OST)	"Ibadat"
2022	Ishq E Laa (OST)	"Saathiya"
2022	Jaadugari	"Jaadugari"
2022	Aashiqui	"Aashiqui"
2022	Mein Tera (album)	"Maahiya" (feat. Meghdeep Bose)
2022	Mein Tera (album)	"Dholna"
2022	Mein Tera (album)	"Main Tera" (feat. Meghdeep Bose)
2022	Mein Tera (album)	"Jaadugari"
2022	Mein Tera (album)	"Aashiqui"
2022	Mein Tera (album)	"Ik Lamha"
2022	Mein Tera (album)	"Meri Sajna Re" (feat. Ustad Rahat Fateh Ali Khan)
2022	Mein Tera (album)	"Zama" (feat. Meghdeep Bose)
2022	Mein Tera (album)	"TU" (feat. Meghdeep Bose)
2023	Kuch Ankahi (OST)	"Kuch Ankahi"
2023	Kuch Ankahi (OST)	"Dildara"
2023	Azaan (album)	"Nadaan Dil"
2023	Azaan (album)	"Beby"
2023	Azaan (album)	"Maa"
2023	Azaan (album)	"Aap Hi Rehte Hain Dil Main"
2023	Azaan (album)	"Husn-e-Jaan"
2023	Azaan (album)	"Hum Dam"
2023	Azaan (album)	"Man Marzi"
2023	Azaan (album)	"Rang Dey"
2024	Hum Dono (OST)	"Hadh Se Zyada"
2024	Meri Tanhai (OST)	"O Piya"
2025	Ae Dil (OST)	"Ae Dil"
2026	Tera Ho Gaya	"Tera Ho Gaya"

== Awards and nominations ==
Year	Award	Category	Work	Result	Ref.
2023	22nd Lux Style Awards	Best Emerging Talent in Television	Ishq E Laa	Nominated	
