= Khaleej (TV series) =

Pakistani television series

- Title screen
- خلیج
- Genre: Family; Drama
- Written by: Imran Aslam
- Directed by: Sahira Kazmi
- Starring: Huma Akbar; Tahira Wasti; Zia Gurchani; Jahanzeb Gurchani; Sajid Hasan
- Country of origin: Pakistan
- Original language: Urdu
- No. of seasons: 1
- No. of episodes: 12

Production
- Producer: Sahira Kazmi

Original release
- Network: PTV
- Release: 1986 – 1986

Khaleej (Urdu: خلیج, lit. 'Gulf') is a 1986 Pakistani television drama series written by Imran Aslam, produced and directed by Sahira Kazmi. It was the debut television serial of Sajid Hasan.

The series is notable for its soundtrack, which featured Tina Sani's rendition of Faiz Ahmed Faiz's ghazal Gar mujhe is ka yakeen ho.... The choice was considered unconventional, as Faiz was subject to an official ban from radio and television during the regime of Muhammad Zia-ul-Haq.

== Plot ==
The drama centres on Zonia, a woman from a wealthy family, and Ayaz, who comes from a modest background. The two marry, but their differing social origins create tensions in their relationship.

== Cast ==
- Huma Akbar as Zonia
- Jahanzeb Gurchani as Ayaz
- Tahira Wasti as Zonia's mother
- Sajid Hasan as Bilal
- Zia Gurchani as Rizwan
- Karim Bakhtiar as Khan Bahadar
- Shahrukh Aftab as Riaz
- Adarsh Ayaz as Daniyal
- Nayyara Niazi as Sehba
- Wakeel Farooqi as Sheikh Sahab
- Sarmadeen Syed as Chotass
- Abid Ali Syed as Manager
- Naeem Siddiqui as Servant
- Anis Raja as Gullu

== Soundtrack ==
The series featured Tina Sani's rendition of Faiz Ahmed Faiz's ghazal Gar mujhe is ka yakeen ho... as its soundtrack.
