= Imran Aslam (journalist) =

Pakistani journalist (1952–2022)

Group President, Geo TV Network and Jang Group

Personal details
- Born: 1951 or 1952 Madras, India (now Chennai)
- Died: 2 December 2022 Karachi, Pakistan
- Education: Government College, Lahore; London School of Economics; SOAS
- Occupation: Journalist; broadcaster; scriptwriter; playwright; media executive
- Known for: Launching The News (English newspaper); launching Geo News, Geo Entertainment, Geo Super

Imran Aslam (Urdu: عمران اسلم; 1952 – 2 December 2022) was a Pakistani journalist, screenwriter and media personality from Pakistan.

== Early life ==
Imran Aslam was born in Madras (now Chennai, India) in 1952. He studied at the Government College, Lahore, where he'd befriend the likes of Salman Shahid and Usman Peerzada, before completing his higher education in London in the 1970s at London School of Economics.

Before he turned to journalism, he worked for Sheikh Zayed bin Sultan Al Nahyan of the UAE. He worked there as the Director of Royal Flight.

== Career ==
=== Journalism ===
He began his journalistic career as the editor of an English language newspaper The Star in 1982. In the 1990s, he was editor of The News, a Karachi-based English daily newspaper.

==== Geo Network ====
In 2015, he became the Group President of GEO Television Network, a subsidiary of Jang Group of Newspapers.

"During his tenure as president, Geo Network launched Geo News channel, Geo Entertainment channel, Geo Super channel, Aag channel, Geo Kahani channel and Geo Tez channel." Aslam was the president of Geo TV Network from 2002. Aslam has been called the creative brain behind Geo Network as a modern media powerhouse.

=== Writing ===
Fluent in Urdu, English, and Bangla, owing to his childhood spent in former East Pakistan (now Bangladesh), Aslam wrote on a wide range of subjects, including sports, business, religious texts, classical literature, Sufism, and comic books. His writing style was noted for its wit.

=== Television series ===
As a screenwriter he wrote over 60 drama scripts for both television and stage. Among his famous PTV dramas were Khaleej in 1986 and Bisaat in 2000, the latter marking the television debut of veteran actor Nadeem.

== Personal life and death ==
Aslam was married to cricket journalist Farishteh Aslam.

Aslam was well-versed in both Indian and Western classical music, including qawwalis, Sufi music, and instrumental compositions. According to his niece, journalist Reema Abbasi, he had memorized works by Shakespeare, Byron, and Keats, as well as Urdu poets such as Ghalib, Mir, and various Sufi poets.

Imran Aslam died on 2 December 2022, at the age of 70.

== Selected filmography ==
=== Television ===
Year	Title	Network	Notes
1986	Khaleej	PTV	
1986	Dastak	PTV	
1990	Rozi	PTV	Based on the 1982 Hollywood film Tootsie
2000	Bisaat	PTV	
2016	Mor Mahal	Geo Entertainment	Concept only

=== Film ===
Year	Title	Notes
2019	Parey Hut Love	

== See also ==
- Mir Shakil ur Rehman
- Mir Ibrahim Rahman
- Mir Khalil ur Rehman
- Daily Jang
- List of Pakistani journalists
