= Karawaan =

Pakistani television series

- کاروان
- Genre: Drama
- Written by: Abdul Qadir Junejo
- Directed by: Iqbal Ansari
- Starring: Huma Akbar; Rahat Kazmi; Bushra Ansari; Talat Hussain
- Country of origin: Pakistan
- Original language: Urdu
- No. of seasons: 1
- No. of episodes: 13

Original release
- Network: PTV
- Release: 1985 – 1985

Karawaan (Urdu: کاروان, lit. 'Caravan') is a 1985 Pakistani television drama series written by Abdul Qadir Junejo and directed by Iqbal Ansari. It is based on the life of Sindhi folk singer Fozia Soomro.

== Plot ==
The drama centres on Sukhaan, a Thari folk singer. Severe drought and the harsh desert climate force Sukhaan's family, friends, and many other inhabitants of the Thar to migrate in search of water. Separated from her companions during the journey, Sukhaan makes her way to the city, where she attempts to establish herself as a professional singer.

== Cast ==
- Huma Akbar as Sukhaan
- Rahat Kazmi as Gul Muhammad Khan
- Bushra Ansari as Sajida
- Talat Hussain as Tofeeq Ahmed
- Ubaida Ansari as Chanal
- Mehmood Siddiqui as Ali Nawaz Khan
- Mazhar Ali as Mansoor
- Malak Anokha as Munshi Muhabbat Khan
- Nisar Qadri as Janu
- Yaqoob Zakria as Mithan
- Sultan Khan as Police Inspector
- Talat Iqbal as Mehmood
- Manzoor Murad as Muhammad Khan
- Imtiaz Niazi as Police Inspector
- Latif Kapadia as Producer
- Arshad Hussain as Rauf
- Saleem Khan as Allah Dad
- Wakeel Farooqi as Editor
- Subhani Ba Yunus as Editor
- Qazi Wajid as Journalist
- Yar Muhammad Shah as Thanedar

== Production ==
Huma Akbar was cast in the lead role after Roohi Bano withdrew from the project. Principal photography took place in the Thar Desert.

== Soundtrack ==
Tina Sani performed the songs of Fozia Soomro for the series.

== Awards and nominations ==
Year	Award	Category	Name	Result	Ref.
1986	PTV Awards	Best Actress	Huma Akbar	Nominated	
1986	PTV Awards	Lighting Expert	Noorundin	Nominated	
1986	PTV Awards	Best Character Actor	Mazhar Ali	Nominated	
1986	PTV Awards	Best Actor	Mehmood Siddiqui	Won	
1986	PTV Awards	Best Writer	Abdul Qadir Junejo	Nominated	
1986	PTV Awards	Best Makeup Artist	Kamal uddin Ahmad	Won	
