= Sajid Hasan =

Pakistani film and television actor

Syed Sajid Hasan
- سید ساجد حسن
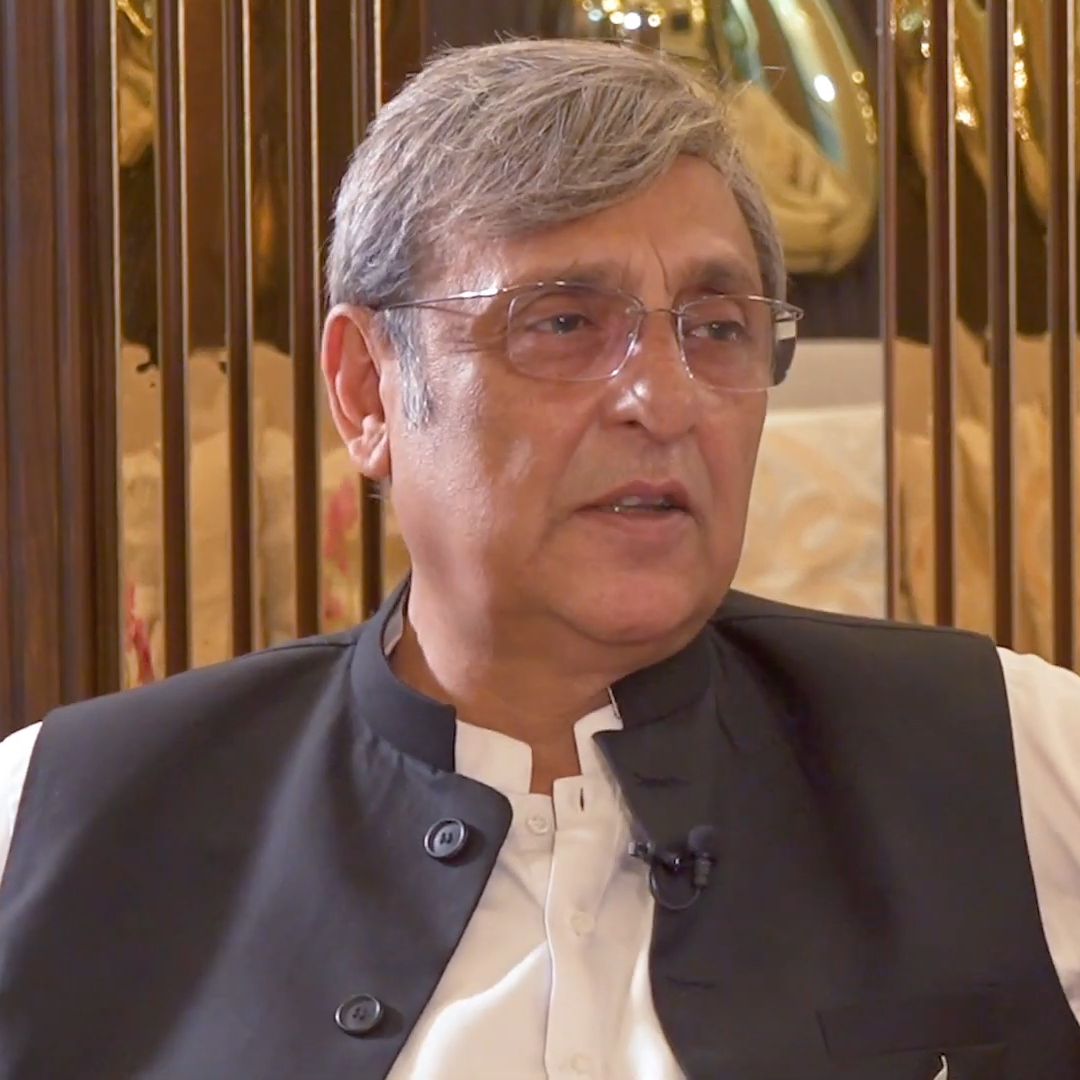
- Hasan in 2024
- Born: 5 January 1958 (age 68); Lahore, Punjab, Pakistan
- Occupations: Actor; Screenwriter; Playwright; Director; TV host; Film producer
- Years active: 1980–present
- Spouse: Shakila Chapra
- Children: 3
- Awards: Pride of Performance (2022); 1st Indus Drama Awards (2005)

Syed Sajid Hasan (born 1958) is a Pakistani actor, screenwriter, film director, TV host, and film producer. He has demonstrated political ambitions, and contested parliamentary elections but has not achieved significant success. As an actor he is best-known for his comic role of Dr. Irfan in the PTV classic Dhoop Kinare (1987).

== Early life and education ==
Hasan was born in Lahore, and raised in Karachi into a Shi'a family and has one sister and three brothers. He completed his masters in English literature from the University of Karachi in 1980.

== Media career ==
=== Actor ===
Hasan began in theatre as a stage actor, collaborating with Rahat Kazmi, with whom he'd open the theatre company Theatre Walley, before making his television debut with the PTV drama Khaleej (1986) and getting his breakthrough with the role of Dr. Irfan, the comic relief in Dhoop Kinare (1987).

He participated in Indian television serials, including Tanha in 1999, becoming the first actor from Pakistan to feature in an Indian drama.

Hasan made his film debut in 2004 with the movie Salakhain, in which he played the antagonist. He also had a role in the Angelina Jolie film A Mighty Heart.

=== Screenwriter and playwright ===
Hasan has written television dramas, including Kachwa aur Khargosh (1989), in which he also acted.

Hasan has also written stage plays, including Hua Kuch Yoon in 2017, described as a love story set before and after the Partition and spanning some 80 years, staged in seven cities for a year.

=== Director and producer ===
Hasan was nominated in the "Best Director for Sitcom" category during the 1st Indus Drama Awards in 2005.

He produced and acted in Dasht-e-Tanhai (2015) for PTV Home.

=== Host ===
In 2021, Hasan began hosting Zindagi With, a talk show airing on ARY Zindagi where he interviews celebrities.

== Political career ==
Hasan has pursued political ambitions multiple times, joining various political parties to contest democratic elections as a candidate.

In April 2018, Hasan joined the Pakistan People's Party (PPP). Two month later, he announced his candidacy for the National Assembly of Pakistan in Karachi’s NA-256 constituency, covering North Nazimabad. He finished seventh out of 16 candidates, receiving 7,587 votes, or 3.82% of the total votes.

In 2024, he joined the Jahangir Tareen-led Istehkam-e-Pakistan Party (IPP).

== Personal life ==
In 2009, one of his brothers and his sister-in-law were killed in a terrorist attack during a Muharram procession on Muhammad Ali Jinnah Road in which the family participated. Hasan himself was injured in the attack.

Hasan is married to Shakila Chapra, a fitness trainer and yoga instructor, and they have three sons.

In 2018, Hasan publicly shared on social media about undergoing a hair transplant surgery. The procedure went wrong, resulting in a severe infection on his scalp and high fever. This incident brought significant attention to the hair transplant industry, raising concerns about its hygienic standards.

== Filmography ==
=== Television serials ===
Year	Title	Role	Screenwriter	Producer	Channel	Country
1986	Khaleej	Bilal			PTV	Pakistan
1987	Dhoop Kinare	Dr. Irfan			PTV	Pakistan
1989	Kachwa aur Khargosh	Ali Asad	Yes		PTV	Pakistan
1990	Tansen				PTV	Pakistan
1992	Sitara Aur Mehrunnisa	Ramis			PTV	Pakistan
1993	Agar	Zaheer			PTV	Pakistan
1993	Nijaat	Ali Asad			PTV	Pakistan
1999	Tanha				StarPlus	India
2000	Thodi Si Bewafai				Sony TV	India
2005	Masuri				PTV	Pakistan
2006	Jaye Kahan Ye Dil				PTV	Pakistan
2008	Rani				PTV	Pakistan
2009	Aashti	Ali Alam			Hum TV	Pakistan
2010	Thori Si Wafa Chahiye	Sheraz			Geo Entertainment	Pakistan
2010	Hum Tum	Asif Mir			Geo Entertainment	Pakistan
2010	Daddy	Jahanzeb			ARY Digital	Pakistan
2011	Akhri Barish				Hum TV	Pakistan
2011	Rok Lo Aaj Ki Raat Ko	Ali Sher			Express Entertainment	Pakistan
2012	Man Jali	Wahab Ahmed			Geo Entertainment	Pakistan
2012	Jannat Se Nikali Hui Aurat				Geo TV	Pakistan
2012	Hazaron Saal				Geo TV	Pakistan
2012	Nadamat	Nawab Shuja-ud-Din			Hum TV	Pakistan
2014	Koi Nahi Apna				ARY Digital	Pakistan
2014	Khata				ARY Digital	Pakistan
2015	Paiwand				ARY Digital	Pakistan
2015	Bay Qasoor	Shehryar			ARY Digital	Pakistan
2015	Unsuni				PTV Home	Pakistan
2015	Dasht-e-Tanhai			Yes	PTV Home	Pakistan
2015	Choti Si Ghalat Fehmi				Hum TV	Pakistan
2016	Yeh Ishq				ARY Digital	Pakistan
2016	Thori Si Bewafai				Express TV	Pakistan
2016	Shehrnaz	Naseeb Gul			Urdu 1	Pakistan
2016	Dekho Chaand Aaya	Abu Jan			Geo Entertainment	Pakistan
2017	Hari Hari Churiyaan	Fasahat			Geo Entertainment	Pakistan
2017	Saanp Seerhi				Express Entertainment	Pakistan
2017	Jao Meri Guriya				A-Plus TV	Pakistan
2017	Mubarak Ho Beti Hui Hai				ARY Digital	Pakistan
2018	Balaa				ARY Digital	Pakistan
2018	Mujhe Qabul Hai				ARY Digital	Pakistan
2018	Kho Gaya Woh				BOL Entertainment	Pakistan
2019	Bandish	Junaid			ARY Digital	Pakistan
2019	Choti Choti Batain	Hassan			Hum TV	Pakistan
2021	Ek Jhoota Lafz Mohabbat	Nasir			Express Entertainment	Pakistan
2022	Aik Sitam Aur	Wahab			ARY Digital	Pakistan
2022	Inaam-e-Mohabbat	Adnan			Geo Entertainment	Pakistan
2024	Jaan Nisar	Aslam			Geo Entertainment	Pakistan
2024	Mohabbat Satrangi	Dilawar Malik			Green Entertainment	Pakistan

=== Telefilms ===
Year	Title	Channel
1997	Putli Ghar	PTV
1999	Neeli Dhoop	PTV
2013	Aur Ghanti Baj Gai	ARY Digital
2018	Baap Bara Na Bhaiya	ARY Zindagi

=== Films ===
Year	Title	Role	Notes
2004	Salakhain	Gang leader Jibran	
2006	Pehla Pehla Pyaar		
2007	A Mighty Heart	Zafir	
2011	Aazaan	Doctor	
2015	Jalaibee	Akbar	
2015	Abdullah: The Final Witness	SP Zaman	
2016	Maalik	Gen. Amjad	
2016	Rahm		
2018	Kaaf Kangana		
2020	Kahay Dil Jidhar		
2024	Jee Ve Sohneya Jee	Adil Parvaiz	Indian Punjabi debut

=== Webseries ===
Year	Title	Role	Network	Notes
2024	Barzakh	Jabbar	ZEE5	Indian co-production
2026	Bait	Parvez	Prime Video	British series

== Awards and nominations ==
- Winner: Best Sitcom Drama Writer in The 1st Indus Drama Awards 2005
- Nominee: Best Director for Sitcom in The 1st Indus Drama Awards 2005
- Pride of Performance from the President of Pakistan 2022

Year	Ceremony	Category	Project	Result
2004	3rd Lux Style Awards	Best TV Actor	Ishq Aatish	Nominated
2005	4th Lux Style Awards	Best TV Actor (Satellite)	Yaad To Ayenge	Nominated
2008	7th Lux Style Awards	Best TV Actor (Satellite)	Shikwah	Nominated
2010	9th Lux Style Awards	Best TV Actor (Terrestrial)	Rani	Nominated
2011	10th Lux Style Awards	Best TV Actor (Satellite)	Thori Si Wafa Chahiye	Nominated

== See also ==
- List of Pakistani actors
