= List of Pakistani films of 2017 =

List of Pakistani films by year 2017

This is a list of Pakistani films released in 2017. Punjab Nahi Jaungi was the highest grossing Pakistani film released on Eid-ul-Azha in 2017. However, it was replaced by Jawani Phir Nahi Ani 2 which was released on Eid-ul-Azha 2018.

== Highest grossing films ==
The top 10 films released in 2017 by worldwide gross are as follows:

Background color indicates the current releases

Highest-grossing films of 2017
Rank	Title	Studio	Gross	Ref.
1.	Punjab Nahi Jaungi	Six Sigma Plus; Salman Iqbal Films	Rs. 51.65 crore (US$1.8 million)	
2.	Mehrunisa V Lub U	Filmwala Pictures; Excellency Films	Rs. 28.20 crore (US$1.0 million)	
3.	Na Maloom Afraad 2	Filmwala Pictures Excellency Films	Rs. 21.00 crore (US$750,000)	
4.	Yalghaar	MindWorks Media	Rs. 20.00 crore (US$720,000)	
5.	Verna	Shoman Productions	Rs. 9.35 crore (US$330,000)	
6.	Chupan Chupai	Huzu Productions	Rs. 7.00 crore (US$250,000)	
7.	Rangreza	Vision Art Films; MH Films; Malkani Films	Rs. 3.50 crore (US$130,000)	
8.	Balu Mahi	Sadia Jabbar Productions	Rs. 3.00 crore (US$110,000)	
9.	Chalay Thay Saath	We Think Films; Hot Water Bottle Films	Rs. 1.50 crore (US$54,000)	
10.	Arth - The Destination	Cinestar; 5th Element	Rs. 1.35 crore (US$48,000)	

== Events ==
=== Award ceremonies ===
Date	Event	Host	Location	Ref.
19 April 2017	16th Lux Style Awards	Atif Aslam	Karachi, Pakistan	
29 April 2017	5th Hum Awards (TV)	Hareem Farooq	Lahore, Pakistan	
17 September 2017	1st IPPA (International Pakistan Prestige Awards)	Yasir Hussain	London, England	
21 October 2017	2nd Hum Style Awards	Saba Qamar	Lahore, Pakistan	

=== Film festivals ===
Date	Event	Host	Location	Ref.
29 to 30 April 2017	The Fashion Expo	Montage Events & Consultants	Ibex Club, Islamabad, Pakistan	
4 to 6 May 2017	ARY Film Festival	ARY Group	Cinepax, Ocean Mall Karachi, Pakistan	

== Releases ==
=== January – April ===
Opening		Title	Genre	Director	Cast	Language	Ref.
J A N
J A N	20	Thora Jee Le	Comedy	Rafay Rashdi	Rizwan Ali Jaffri, Bilal Abbas, Ramsha Khan, Salman Faisal, Fatima Jillani, Kasim Khan, Ahsan Mohsin Ikram	Urdu	
F E B	10	Balu Mahi	Romantic Comedy	Haissam Hussain	Osman Khalid Butt, Ainy Jaffri, Sadaf Kanwal, Javed Sheikh, Shafqat Cheema, Durdana Butt	Urdu	
F E B	17	Whistle	Action Thriller	Ammad Azhar	Sohail Sameer, Farhan Ally Agha, Tatmain Ul Qulb, Imran Ali Mani, Osama Bin Ghaazi, Meerab Awan Meeru, Ihsan Khan, Aamir Kazmi, Daud Khan aurak	Urdu	
M A R	31	Raasta	action-drama film	Sahir Lodhi	Sahir Lodhi, Aijaz Aslam, Abeer Rizvi, Shamoon Abbasi, Mathira, Sana Nawaz, Naveed Raza, Saleem Mairaj, Irfan Motiwala, Saima Azhar	Urdu	
A P R	14	Stirgay Sre Na Manum	Action	Arshad Khan	Shahid Khan, Mehak Noor	Pashto	
A P R	21	Chalay Thay Saath	Romance	Umer Adil	Syra Shehroz, Kent S Leung, Osama Tahir, Zhalay Sarhadi, Behroze Sabzwari, Mansha Pasha, Faris Khalid, Sherbaaz Kaleem	Urdu	

=== May – August ===
Opening		Title	Genre	Director	Cast	Language	Ref.
J U N	26	Yalghaar	war-epic action	Hassan Rana	Shaan Shahid, Humayun Saeed, Adnan Siddiqui, Armeena Khan, Ayesha Omer, Ayub Khoso, Gohar Rasheed, Hassan Rana; Bilal Ashraf, Sikander Rizvi, Sana Bucha, Uzma Khan, Aleeze Nasser, Umair Jaswal, Ashir Azeem	Urdu	
J U N	26	Firasat	Action, Thriller	Atta Shah Hoti	Khursheed Khan, Parveen, Atta Shah Hoti, Jehangir Adil, Bibi Shireena, Badar Munir, Nasir Khan, Arshad Khan, Wahid Khan	Pashto	
J U N	26	Mehrunisa V Lub U	Romantic, Comedy	Yasir Nawaz	Danish Taimoor, Sana Javed, Jawed Sheikh, Nayyer Ejaz, Qavi Khan	Urdu	
J U N	26	Zakhmona	Action Thriller	Shahid Usman	Arbaz Khan, Ajab Gul, Afreen Khan, Laila Khan, Jahangir Khan	Pashto	
J U N	26	Sta Muhabbat Me Zindagi Da	Action Romance	A.K. Khan	Arbaaz Khan, Sobia Khan, Jahangir Khan, Asif Khan	Pashto	
A U G	11	Geo Sar Utha Kay	action-drama	Nadeem Cheema	Babar Ali, Shafqat Cheema, Nayyar Ejaz, Sheharyar Cheema, Umar Cheema, Naeem Khan, Areeba Khan, Ahmad Cheema, Qaynaat Rana, Rashid Mehmood	Urdu	
A U G	11	Chain Aye Na	Romance	Syed Noor	Shehroz Sabzwari, Sarish Khan, Adil Murad, Sobia Khan, Waqar Ali Godhra	Urdu	
A U G	11	Sangat	action-drama	Sami Sarang	Shahid Hammed, Sami Sarang, Naeem Bangulzai, Naheem Albaloshi	Balochi	

=== September – December ===
Opening		Title	Genre	Director	Cast	Language	Ref.
S E P	2	Na Maloom Afraad 2	Comedy, Thriller	Nabeel Qureshi	Urwa Hocane, Fahad Mustafa, Javed Sheikh, Nayyar Ejaz, Saleem Mairaj, Mohsin Abbas Haider, Hania Amir	Urdu	
S E P	2	Punjab Nahi Jaungi	Romantic, Drama	Nadeem Beyg	Humayun Saeed, Mehwish Hayat, Urwa Hocane, Ahmad Ali Butt, Azfar Rehman, Saba Hameed, Waseem Abbas, Sohail Ahmed	Urdu, Punjabi	
S E P	14	Saawan	Drama	Farhan Alam	Syed Karam Abbas, Najiba Faiz, Saleem Mairaj, Imran Aslam, Tipu Sharif	Urdu	
N O V	17	Verna	Social Drama	Shoaib Mansoor	Mahira Khan, Haroon Shahid, Zarrar Khan, Naimal Khawar, Rasheed Naz	Urdu	
D E C
D E C	21	Rangreza	Musical-Romance	Amir Mohiuddin	Bilal Ashraf, Urwa Farhan, Gohar Rasheed, Saleem Mairaj, Akbar Subhani, Seemi Pasha	Urdu	
D E C	21	Arth - The Destination	Romantic Drama	Shaan Shahid	Shaan Shahid, Humaima Malick, Uzma Hassan, Mohib Mirza	Urdu	
D E C	29	Chupan Chupai	Comedy Drama	Mohsin Ali	Ahsan Khan, Neelam Muneer, Adnan Jaffar, Sakina Samo, Rehan Sheikh	Urdu	

== See also ==
- List of highest-grossing Pakistani films
- List of highest-grossing films in Pakistan
- List of Pakistani films of 2018
