= List of Pashto-language films of 2017 =

== January–April ==
Opening	Title	Genre	Director	Cast	Ref.
February 17	Saudagar	Drama-action	Shahid Usman	Shahid Khan, Afreen Pari, Jahangir Khan Jani, Madhu, Asif Khan	
May 17	Khandani Jawarger	Auction	Haji Nadir Khan and	Shahid Khan, Jhangir Jani, Sumbal Khan, Kiran Khan, Asif Khan, Shahjahan, M.H.Swati	
April 7	Aashiqui	Romance	Sidra Noor	Arbaz Khan, Sobia Khan, Jhangir Khan, Sidra Noor, Asif Khan, Jiya Butt, M.H.Swati	
April 14	Stirgay Sre Na Manum	Action	Arshad Khan	Shahid Khan, Mehak Noor	

== May–August ==
Opening	Title	Genre	Director	Cast	Ref
June 26	Zakhmona	Action-thriller	Shahid Usman	Arbaz Khan, Ajab Gul, Afreen Khan, Laila Khan, Jhangir Khan,	
June 26	Dus Khushi Ba Mane	Drama-action	Arshad Khan	Shahid Khan, Dua Qureshi	
June 26	Gul-e-Jana	Romantic-thriller	Liaquat Ali Khan	Aryan Khan, Afreen Pari, Rasheed Naz	
June 26	Giraftar	Action	Haji Nadir Khan	Shahid Khan, Jhangir Jani, Sobia Khan, Asif Khan	
June 26	Sta Muhabbat Me Zindagi Da	Action-romance	A K Khan	Arbaaz Khan, Sobia Khan, Jahangir Khan, Asif Khan	
August 11	Mujrim	Action-romance	Arbaz Khan	Arbaaz Ali Khan, Jhangir Khan	

== September–December ==
Opening	Title	Genre	Director	Cast	Ref.
September 1	Lambay	Action	Shahid Usman	Arbaaz Khan, Jahangir Khan Jani, Ajab Gul, Afreen Fari, Sidra Noor,	
September 1	Juram Ao Saza	Action-thriller	Arbaaz Khan	Arbaz Khan, Jahangir Khan Jani, Ajab Gul, Afreen Fari, Sidra Noor	
September 1	Shadal Zalmay	Drama-Action	Arshid Khan	Shahid Shan, Jahangir Khan Jani, Babrak Shah	

== Expired artists in Pashto cinema ==
Name	Category	Date of death	Ref.
Umar Daraz Khallil	Actor	16 December 2016	
