= Noreen Gulwani =

Pakistani actress

- Born: Noreen Mumtaz Gulwani; 2 October 1997 (age 29); Karachi, Pakistan
- Education: National Academy of Performing Arts
- Occupations: Actress; Model
- Years active: 2020 – present

Noreen Gulwani (born 2 October 1997) is a Pakistani actress who works in films and TV. She is best known for her roles in the dramas Safar Tamam Howa, Bakhtawar, Pyari Mona and Muhabbat Gumshuda Meri.

== Early life ==
Gulwani completed her early education from The City School in Karachi. She later went to Malaysia to pursue further education in social sciences. She returned to Pakistan and worked for an IT company then she went to National Academy of Performing Arts for three years to learn acting and was trained by Zia Mohyeddin. After taking a degree in acting she worked as a model and appeared in commercials.

== Career ==
She made her debut as an actress in drama Mohabbatein Chahtein on Hum TV which was written by Samira Fazal. Then she appeared in drama Bharaas along with Omer Shahzad, Zubab Rana, Furqan Qureshi and Durefishan Saleem in which she played the role of Maira; later she appeared in the film Akeli. In 2021, she appeared in the drama Safar Tamam Howa with Madiha Imam, Ali Rehman Khan and Syed Jibran and played the role of Nazo, the daughter of Nazli Begum and later married to Sami. Then she appeared in the drama Khaab Toot Jaatay Hain, written by Amjad Islam Amjad and directed by Mohammed Ehteshamuddin. It was based on the book The Wastes of Times written by Syed Sajjad Hussain; the story is set in 1970s and is about the Fall of Dhaka. She played the role of a student from West Pakistan.

In 2022 she appeared with Yumna Zaidi and Zaviyar Nauman Ijaz in the drama Bakhtawar, written by Nadia Ahmed; she played the role of Huriya. Then she appeared in dramas Pyari Mona, Daurr, Jhoom and Muhabbat Gumshuda Meri.

== Filmography ==
=== Television ===
Year	Title	Role	Network
2020	Mohabbatein Chahatein	Pari	Hum TV
2020	Bharaas	Maira	ARY Digital
2021	Safar Tamam Howa	Nazo	Hum TV
2021	Khaab Toot Jaatay Hain	University student	Hum TV
2022	Bakhtawar	Huriya	Hum TV
2023	Pyari Mona	Kinza	Hum TV
2023	Muhabbat Gumshuda Meri	Rushna Daniyal	Hum TV
2023	Jhoom	Mahlab	Geo Entertainment
2023	Daurr	Laila	Green Entertainment
2023	Rang Badlay Zindagi	Aima	Hum TV
2023	Grey	Bushra	Green Entertainment
2024	Very Filmy	Mumtaz	Hum TV
2024	Dil Manay Na	Munaza	Green Entertainment
2024	Zard Patton Ka Bunn	Dr. Malaika Rehman	Hum TV
2024	BOL Kahani	Kiran	BOL Network
2025	Pehli Mohabbat	Hania	Hum TV
2025	Sher	Rida	ARY Digital
2025	Dil Dhoondta Hai Phir Wohi	Muqaddas	Express Entertainment
2025	Visaal-E-Ishq	Anoushay	Green Entertainment

=== Film ===
Year	Title	Role	Notes
2020	Paying Guest	Nazia	
2021	Akeli	Sarah	
2024	Nayab	Sadia	
2025	Aasmaan Bolay Ga		
