= Syed Ali Ahsan =

Bengali poet and writer

- সৈয়দ আলী আহসান

Vice-Chancellor of Darul Ihsan University
- In office 1989 – 25 July 2002
- Preceded by: Syed Ali Ashraf
- Succeeded by: Syed Anwar Husain

President of Bangla Academy
- In office 10 October 1977 – 9 October 1979
- Preceded by: Syed Murtaza Ali
- Succeeded by: Abdul Haque Faridi

Vice-Chancellor of the University of Rajshahi
- In office 27 September 1975 – 26 June 1977
- Preceded by: Mazharul Islam
- Succeeded by: Muhammad Abdul Bari

Vice-Chancellor of Jahangirnagar University
- In office 1972–1975
- Preceded by: Mafizuddin Ahmed
- Succeeded by: Muhammad Enamul Haq

Personal details
- Born: 26 March 1922 Alokdia, Magura, Bengal Presidency, British India
- Died: 25 July 2002 (aged 80) Dhaka, Bangladesh
- Relatives: Syed Ali Ashraf (brother); Syed Sajjad Hussain (cousin)
- Education: Dhaka College; University of Dhaka

Syed Ali Ahsan (Bengali: সৈয়দ আলী আহসান; 26 March 1922 – 25 July 2002) was a Bangladeshi poet, writer and university academic. He was awarded Ekushey Padak (1982) and Independence Day Award (1987) by the Government of Bangladesh. In 1987, he was selected as the National Professor of Bangladesh. He was credited as the official English translator of the National Anthem of Bangladesh.

== Early life ==
Ahsan was born on 26 March 1922, to a Bengali Muslim family of Syeds in the village of Alokdia in Magura (formerly under Jessore District), Bengal Province. His father, Syed Ali Hamed, was a school inspector. His mother, Syeda Kamrunnegar Khatun, was the daughter of Syed Mukarram Ali, the Zamindar and Pir of Agla in Nawabganj, Dhaka. His brothers were the Cambridge-educated Islamic philosopher and critic, Prof. Syed Ali Ashraf, and Syed Ali Naqi, also a professor. He grew up in an atmosphere steeped in Sufi traditions inherited from both his paternal and maternal ancestors. While studying at the Armanitola Government High School in 1937, Ahsan published a poem called The Rose in his school magazine. Subsequently, stories, essays and poems written by him in Bengali were published in magazines such as Azad, Mohammadi and Saogat. When he was a student of the department of English in Dhaka University his essay titled 'Kavi Satyendranath Dutta' was published in the quarterly Parichay, a magazine edited by Sudhindranath Dutta. As a student and later as a scholar, he was a key figure in the East Pakistan Literary Society, an influential movement for a more Islamically conscious Bengali literature; his brother Syed Ali Ashraf and his cousin Syed Sajjad Hussain were also involved. Unlike the latter two, Syed Ali Ahsan abandoned his erstwhile support of Pakistan, and became an advocate of Bangladeshi independence.

== Career ==
Ahsan worked in All India Radio. He was a professor of department of Bengali in University of Dhaka and later, head of the department of Bengali of University of Karachi. In Karachi, he edited the Bengali Literary Review, an English-language journal loosely concerned with Bengali Muslim literature and culture; it published many writers associated with the East Pakistan Literary Society.

He was a director of Bangla Academy and was the vice chancellor of Jahangirnagar University, University of Rajshahi and Darul Ihsan University. In addition, he was a National Professor (Jatio Addhapok) of Bangladesh. He was also an adviser of the Nobel prize committee for literature from 1976 to 1982.

He was an editor of the antique book "Bangladesh; a souvenir on the first anniversary of Victory Day, December 16, 1972.", as well.

Soon after the partition of India in 1947, Pakistan PEN was established in the year 1948. Ali Ahsan was its first secretary general while Muhammad Shahidullah was its president. When Bangladesh was born in 1971, PEN Bangladesh started its journey with Ali Ahsan as its president.

== Awards ==
- Bangla Academy Literary Award (1967)
- Ekushey Padak (1982)
- Independence Day Award (1987)

== Death ==
Ahsan died on 25 July 2002. He was buried next to the Jahangirnagar University Mosque with national honour.

== Works ==
=== Books ===
- America Amar Kichu Kotha
- Chorjageeti Proshongo
- Kobita Shomogro
- Kotha Bichitra: Bishyo Shahitto

=== Poetry ===
- Onek Akas
- Ekok Shandhay Bosonto
- Sohosha Sochokit
- Amar Protidiner Shobdo
- Somudrei Jabo

=== Criticism ===
- Nazrul Islam
- Kobitar Kotha
- Iqbaler Kobita

Rabindra kabeyr bhumika

=== Translations ===
- "Oedipus"
- "Whitemaner Kobita"
