= Tazeen Hussain =

Pakistani actress

Tazeen Hussain is a Pakistani actress who works in Pakistani television. The daughter of actor Talat Hussain, she made her acting debut in the late 1990s. After several television appearances, she made her television comeback in 2022.

== Personal life ==
Hussain is the daughter of actor Talat Hussain. Her husband Zahid Hussain died of a heart attack in 2020.

Hussain married for the second time to Amir Syedain in April 2025.

== Career ==
Hussain made her acting debut in 1994 with Shalimar Television Network's telefilm Raqeeb, opposite Faisal Rehman. She then appeared in Syed Mohammad Ahmed's telefilm Aurat. She played a girl with management problems in Shahpar.

She returned to television after a hiatus of more than fifteen years in Mohammed Ehteshamuddin's Yunhi where she played a composed and divorced daughter of a typical Pakistani family. She next appeared in Mehreen Jabbar-directed Jurm as a mother seeking justice for her murdered daughter.

== Filmography ==
=== Films ===
Year	Title	Role	Network	Notes
2024	Daghabaaz Dil	Zohra Phuppo	Hum Films	Debut Film

=== Television ===
Year	Title	Role	Network	Notes / Ref(s)
1995	Itni Si Baat	Sukaina		
1997	Shahpar	Seema		
2001	Mohalt			
2001	Anjanay Raastey	Maryam		
2023	Yunhi	Iqbal "Bali" Karamat	Hum TV	Comeback to television after a hiatus.
2023	Jurm	Naseema Nadeem	Geo Entertainment	
2023	Zulm	Rameen	Hum TV	
2024	Let's Try Mohabbat	Samiya Sher Ali	Green Entertainment	
2024	Khayal		BOL Network	
2025	Qarz-e-Jaan	Bisma	Hum TV	
2025	Jama Taqseem	Zobia	Hum TV	

=== Telefilms ===
Year	Title	Role
1994	Raqeeb	Shahida
1994	Aurat	
1997	Deeda e Purkhoon	
1998	Shaam Say Pehle	
