= Fasi Zaka =

Pakistani political commentator, columnist, radio talk show host and television anchor

- فصیح زکاء
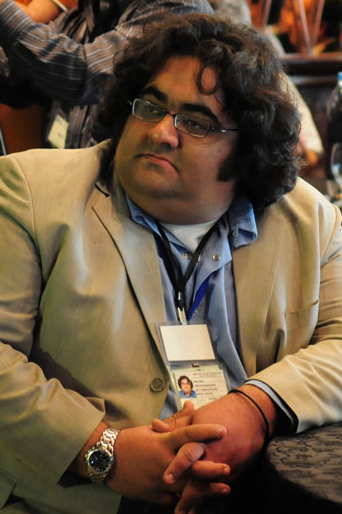
- Born: Charsadda, North-West Frontier Province, Pakistan
- Education: Edwardes College; University of Peshawar; Somerville College, Oxford
- Occupations: Political commentator; columnist; radio talk show host; television anchor
- Years active: 2004–present
- Employers: Dawn News; Radio1 FM91
- Television: News, Views & Confused (2007); Do Raaye (2017)

Fasi Zaka (Pashto: فاسی زاکا; born 9 October) is a Pakistani political commentator, columnist, radio talk show host, and television anchor.

Zaka attended Somerville College, Oxford as a Rhodes Scholar. He rose to prominence for his satirical views of the global war on terror and the 2007 emergency rule in Pakistan, as host of News, Views & Confused on Aaj TV. After featuring as a columnist for The News, Zaka began The Fasi Zaka Show on Radio1 FM91, which became one of the highest-rated radio shows in the country. He returned to television a decade later as co-host of the primetime current affairs programme Do Raaye on Dawn News in 2017.

He was declared a Young Global Leader by the World Economic Forum and has been described as a "media polymath" and "shock jock".

== Early life ==
Born to a Pakhtun family from Charsadda, Zaka received his elementary schooling in Peshawar, where he stayed until he acquired his bachelor's degree from Edwardes College in Peshawar and master's degree from the University of Peshawar. Zaka is also a University of Oxford postgraduate funded as a Rhodes Scholar in the session 2001–03 from Somerville College.

== Career ==
Zaka began his career in 2004 as the host of the off-beat music program On the Fringe, in collaboration with his cousin Zeeshan Pervez. The show aired on Indus Music and later MTV Pakistan.

=== News, Views & Confused ===
On 11 April 2007, Zaka started to host and script a political and social satire show on AAJ TV. The show News, Views & Confused was co-hosted by Nadeem F. Paracha and Mohsin Sayeed, and received significant international attention through The Washington Post and other publications for its programmes during the second emergency declared during President Musharraf's rule in 2007 amidst a severe clampdown on press freedom. The show ended its run in 2008.

=== Columnist ===
Zaka is currently a weekly opinion editorial writer for The Express Tribune, the paper which also brings out the International Herald Tribune in Pakistan. He used to write as a columnist for the leading Pakistani newspaper, The News International, where he wrote the weekly political opinion editorial column, The Pakistan Report Card and the pop culture criticism column titled His Bigness in the Instep segment of the Sunday edition. He wrote a bi-weekly light humour diary column in the weekly magazine The Friday Times under the heading, Man Friday. As a writer some of his prominent themes have included bringing back rationality into civil dialogue, political satire, debunking conspiracy theories that affect the national discourse in Pakistan.

=== Radio ===
Zaka headlines one of Pakistan's most listened to radio shows, The Fasi Zaka and Friends Show, on Pakistan's FM radio station Radio One FM 91, which is aired nationally. The show is aired three times a week, and is known for its absurdist humour and liberal politics embedded in the jokes.

=== Do Raaye ===
Zaka returned to television in 2017 alongside Asad Rahim Khan, as coanchor of Do Raaye on Dawn News, a primetime current affairs programme.
