= Nayab (film) =

2024 film

- Directed by: Umair Nasir Ali
- Written by: Ali Abbasi Naqvi; Basit Naqvi
- Produced by: Rumina Umair; Umair Irfani
- Starring: Yumna Zaidi; Jawed Sheikh; Usama Khan; Noreen Gulwani
- Cinematography: Shajee Hasan
- Production companies: Kenneyz Films; NUM Films
- Release date: 26 January 2024 (Pakistan)
- Running time: 153 minutes
- Country: Pakistan
- Language: Urdu

Nayab is a 2024 Pakistani coming-of-age sports drama film, directed by Umair Nasir Ali in his directorial debut. Set in Karachi, it features Yumna Zaidi in the title role, an aspiring cricketer desiring to play in the Cricket World Cup. Jawed Sheikh, M. Fawad Khan, and Noreen Gulwani appeared in prominent roles. It released theatrically in Pakistan on 26 January 2024, and on 2 February internationally.

== Synopsis ==
Nayab is an aspiring cricketer with a burning desire to play in the World Cup for Pakistan’s national team, but she needs the support of her family, particularly her elder brother. A middle-class girl from Karachi, she rebels against her parent's expectations of a different life, and with her brother’s help a former cricket hopeful himself, she trains to chase her dream of playing for Pakistan.

== Cast ==
- Yumna Zaidi as Nayab
- Jawed Sheikh as Shahid (Nayab's father)
- M. Fawad Khan as Akber
- Usama Khan as Zain
- Huma Nawab as Piyari Baji
- Noreen Gulwani as Sadia
- Hani Taha
- Shaheera Jalil Albasit
- Mahdi Qasmi as Bazil
- Faryal Mehmood as Dancer
- Mohammed Ehteshamuddin as Yawar Kazmi
- Adnan Siddiqui as Sikander Malik

== Production ==
The film was announced by Kenneyz Group on 4 January 2023, in collaboration with NUM Films. Umair Nasir Ali was the director, making his debut role. Though Yumna Zaidi, who played the lead character, has rejected many films offered to her. However, she said it was interesting not to decline the role since the film has a better storyline.

For the filming, she went to many cricket tutorials and practices, and proceeded filming after Tere Bin. The motion poster and trailer was released on 2 and 10 December 2023 respectively.

== Release ==
Nayab was released theatrically in Pakistan on 26 January 2024, followed by an international release on 2 February 2024. Nayab was selected for the 2025 SCO Film Festival in Chongqing, China, where it won the Jury Special Award out of 19 competing films from SCO member states. The Embassy of Pakistan in Madrid hosted a special screening of Nayab as part of the Pakistani Film Festival in Madrid, organised in collaboration with Casa Asia and Amigos de Pakistan.

== Reception ==
=== Box office ===
The film initially collected 46 lacs PKR on its opening weekend, adding 21 lacs PKR in the following four days to reach a first-week total of 67 lacs PKR. By the end of its fourth week, it had grossed 1.55 crore PKR from the domestic market, with an additional 91 lacs PKR from overseas territories including North America, the UK, and the UAE, bringing its worldwide box office to approximately 2.5 crore PKR. A later report noted the film had collected 1.6 crores at the domestic box office.

=== Critical reception ===
The film received mixed reviews, with critics generally praising the performances and technical execution while finding the narrative uneven. Dawn Images praised the film's script for showcasing real issues and the director's attention to minor details, noting that "the movie has laughs, tears and powerful messages about determination, resilience, and the pursuit of dreams." A separate review in Dawn (The Icon) called Nayab "a family drama with its feet firmly set on the ground" rather than a sensationalised sports film, praising Fawad Khan's performance as "excellent" and the film's "subtle" strength in developing every character, even minor ones, while acknowledging the director's "preference for quick conclusions" and the lengthy 2.5-hour runtime. The Express Tribune praised the acting performances of Fawad Khan, Ehteshamuddin, and Jawed Sheikh but was critical of Yumna Zaidi's performance, stating she lacks the "conviction and mannerism" to make the character convincing; the reviewer further criticised the film's pace, the "hurried and rushed" climax, the romantic track of the lead, and the lack of impactful sports-related scenes. The News International noted the banality of its story and the humanising of the film's characters. Diva Magazine gave the film 3.5 out of 5 stars, praising its strong first half and "palpable energy of Karachi" but criticising the post-intermission melodrama and excessive runtime, concluding that "Nayab, even with its shortcomings, is a strong story that needed to be told."

== Accolades ==
Award	Date of ceremony	Category	Result	Ref(s)
World Film Festival, Cannes	May 2024	Best Foreign Film	Won	
World Film Festival, Cannes	May 2024	Best First Time Filmmaker	Won	
South Asian International Film Festival Florida	February 2025	Best Feature Film	Won	
South Asian International Film Festival Florida	February 2025	Best Actress (Yumna Zaidi)	Won	
SCO Film Festival, Chongqing, China	July 2025	Jury Special Award	Won	
South Asian Film Festival of Montreal	May 2025	Special Mention (Feature Fiction)	Won	
Listapad – Minsk International Film Festival	Nov 2024	Special Jury Diploma	Won	

== See also ==
- List of Pakistani films of 2024
