= Gohar Rasheed =

Pakistani actor

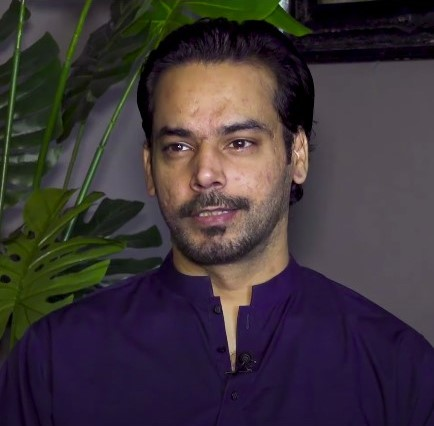
- Rasheed in 2023
- Born: Mirza Gohar Rasheed; Lahore, Punjab, Pakistan
- Education: Government College University; Beaconhouse National University
- Occupation: Actor
- Years active: 2007–present
- Spouse: Kubra Khan (m. 2025)
- Relatives: Ghulam Ahmed Perwez (grandfather)

Mirza Gohar Rasheed is a Pakistani actor.

He is known for the 2013 film Seedlings, which earned him a nomination for best actor in a supporting role at the 2012 New York Film Festival and the 1st ARY Film Awards, and nomination for best actor at the 13th Lux Style Awards. He also appeared in the 2022 film The Legend of Maula Jatt.

== Early life and education ==
Rasheed was born in Lahore, Pakistan. The famous Islamic scholar Ghulam Ahmed Perwez was his maternal grandfather. Rasheed's parents wanted him to join a family stock trading business, but Rasheed declined, favouring media studies. He attended Government College University, Lahore and received an undergraduate degree, majoring in theatre, film, television, minoring in journalism from Beaconhouse National University. He later moved to Karachi for further studies. He subsequently got a job as a line producer at Hum TV, but quit after three years to pursue theatre acting.

== Personal life ==
Rasheed married actress Kubra Khan on 12 February 2025 in Saudi Arabia.

== Career ==
=== Acting ===
Rasheed made his theatre debut in Bombay Dreams directed and produced by Shah Sharabeel in 2008, where he played an Indian character of Vikram. His first major theatre role was musical Moulin Rouge, playing The Duke of Monroth. He later acted in a 2013 political play by Anwar Maqsood and Dawar Mehmood The Sawa 14 August as a General Zia-ul-Haq. He took the role of Iftekhar in comical play Half Plate by Anwar and Dawar in 2014.

Rasheed also marked his acting career as a supporting character along with Samiya Mumtaz in Daddy, and received wide acclaim in television through drama serial, Shikwa. He played Shaukt in Hum TV's blockbuster serial Digest Writer and appeared in the serials: Goyaa, Khuda Na Karay and Nazdeekiyan. According to Gohar, theatre and films are his domain, and "TV needs to grow up first, because I am not going to end up with roles that have been done hundreds of times." After praise for Digest Writer Gohar signed several 2015 dramas of ARY Digital, Bismil alongside Hareem Farooq and Aitraz (previously entitled Tum Rahay Na Tum) opposite Imran Abbas, Sana Javed and Sania Saeed, and Paiwand. In 2016, he appeared in Mann Mayal as Meekail with Maya Ali, Hamza Ali Abbasi and Ayesha Khan.

His film credits include Seedlings and Main Hoon Shahid Afridi, receiving significant praise for his acting in Seedlings. He received his role in ensemble film Main Hoon Shahid Afridi from Humayun Saeed for his performance in Moulin Rouge.

In 2013, Gohar was chosen to play Babar in Zeba Bakhtiar's film O21 alongside Bilal Ashraf and Ayaz Samoo as a trio of antagonists. Gohar starred as corrupt SHO Jibroun, alongside Humayun Saeed, as Shafqat Cheema in Hamza Ali Abbasi's yet-unreleased action-comedy film Kambakht and as Baran in Hassan Waqas Rana's war epic Yalghaar. He features as a dholak player in Aamir Mohiuddin's Rangreza alongside Sana Javed and Bilal Ashraf. He stars as famed Pakistan fast bowler Shoaib Akhtar in the 2023 film Rawalpindi Express.

=== Radio ===
Outside his acting career, Gohar is an active RJ at Radio1 FM91 for Karachi Station and has run the Pakistanwalah program.

== Filmography ==
=== Films ===
Key
†	Denotes films that have not yet been released

Year	Movie	Role	Notes	Ref(s)
2013	Seedlings	Anil Kumar		
2013	Main Hoon Shahid Afridi	Kashif Ali a.k.a. Kaali Andhi		
2014	O21	Babar		
2015	Jawani Phir Nahi Aani	XYZ (fashion designer)	Cameo appearance	
2017	Yalghaar	Baran		
2017	Rangreza	Waseem Wallay		
2020	Lockdown			
2022	London Nahi Jaunga	Bhatti		
2022	The Legend of Maula Jatt	Maakha Natt		
2023	Money Back Guarantee	Nawaz Sindhi		
2025	Neelofar	Firoz Ashraf		
TBA	Kambakht	SHO Jabrone	Post-production	

=== Television ===
Year	Serial	Role	Channel	Ref
2014	Shikwa		ARY Digital	
2014	Goya	Adnan	ARY Digital	
2014	Digest Writer	Shaukat	Hum TV	
2014	Khuda Na Karay	Kashif	ARY Digital	
2014	Nazdeekiyan		ARY Digital	
2015	Khilona	Umer	ARY Digital	
2015	Mere Jevan Sathi	Moed	ARY Digital	
2015	Paiwand	Ali	ARY Digital	
2015	Aitraaz	Arsalan	ARY Digital	
2016	Mann Mayal	Mikaeel	Hum TV	
2017	Mujhay Jeenay Do	Naseeb	Urdu 1	
2018	Meri Nanhi Pari		ARY Digital	
2018	Noor Bibi	Raja Sameer Ali	Geo Entertainment	
2019	Ramz-e-Ishq	Umer	Geo Entertainment	
2020	Ishqiya	Azeem	ARY Digital	
2020	Raaz-e-Ulfat	Ismail	Geo Entertainment	
2021	Pardes	Asim	ARY Digital	
2021	Laapata	Daniyal	Hum TV	
2021	Amanat	Qaiser	ARY Digital	
2021	Dil-e-Momin	Gohar	Geo Entertainment	
2023	Jannat Se Aagay	Nauman	Geo Entertainment	
2023	Jindo	Hasrat	Green Entertainment	
2024	Let's Try Mohabbat	Azlan Ali	Green Entertainment	
2024	Mann Jogi	Chaudhry Shabbir	Hum TV	
2025	Ae Dil	Kabir	ARY Digital	
2025	Goonj	Nabeel	Hum TV	
2025	Case No. 9	Inspector Shafiq	Geo Entertainment	
2026	Aik Aur Pakeezah	Barrister Zubair	Geo Entertainment	
2026	Punch		ARY Digital	

=== Theater ===
Year	Play	Place	Role	Notes
2008	Bombay Dreams	NAPA, Lahore	Vikram	Center Stage Production – Directed & Produced by Shah Shahrabeel
2009	Tom Dick and Harry	NAPA, Lahore	Constable Down's	Center Stage Production – Directed & Produced by Shah Shahrabeel
2010	Moulin Rouge	NAPA, Karachi	Duke	Center Stage Production – Directed & Produced by Shah Shahrabeel
2011	Bombay Dreams	NAPA, Karachi	Akash	Center Stage Production – Directed & Produced by Shah Shahrabeel
2013	Sawa 14 August	NAPA, Karachi; NAPA, Lahore; NAPA, Islamabad	General Zia-ul-Haq	Kopy Kats Production – Written by: Anwar Maqsood – Directed by: Dawar Mehmood
2014	Half Plate	NAPA, Karachi; NAPA, Lahore; NAPA, Islamabad	Iftekhar Ahmed	Kopy Kats Production – Written by: Anwar Maqsood – Directed by: Dawar Mehmood

=== Radio ===
Year	Station Show Name	Radio station	Role
2007–present	Pakistanwallah	Radio1 FM91	Radio Jockey / RJ

== Awards and nominations ==
Year	Award	Category	Work	Result	Ref(s)
2012	New York Film Festival	Best Actor in a Supporting Role	Seedlings	Nominated	
2014	ARY Film Awards	Best Actor in a Supporting Role	Seedlings	Nominated	
2014	13th Lux Style Awards	Best Film Actor	Seedlings	Nominated	
2017	5th Hum Awards	Best Supporting Actor	Mann Mayal	Nominated	
2017	1st International Pakistan Prestige Awards	Best Supporting Actor	Mann Mayal	Won	
2018	17th Lux Style Awards	Best Supporting Actor in a Film	Rangreza	Nominated	
2021	2nd Pakistan International Screen Awards	Best Supporting Actor	Rangreza	Raaz-e-Ulfat	Nominated
2021	ARY People's Choice Awards	Favorite Actor in the Role of Damad	Ishqiya	Won	
2023	5th International Pakistan Prestige Awards	Best Supporting Role - Film	London Nahi Jaunga	Nominated	
2023	1st Kya Drama Hai Icon Awards	Outstanding Negative Roles (Critics Choice)	Jindo	Nominated	
2025	2nd Kya Drama Hai Icon Awards	Best Performance in a Negative Role (Critics’ Choice)	Mann Jogi	Nominated	

== See also ==
- List of Lollywood actors
