= Qurram Hussain =

- Born: 10 March 1976 (age 50); Muscat, Oman
- Occupations: singer; musician
- Years active: 1998–present

Qurram Hussain is a Pakistani Canadian musician and member of JoSH, a Montreal-based South Asian fusion band, which has released four albums and 17 music videos internationally. Hussain has created remixes with Domeno, Priyanka Chopra, Pitbull, Nelly Furtado, and Komal Rizvi. He has performed live internationally. He also performs solo and has written for film.

== Biography ==
Hussain has an engineering degree and worked in a software development company for seven years, while doing music and school on the side as head of web Technologies. Hussain joined JoSH, formed by Rupinder Magon in 1998. The duo focused on fusing the musical genres of R&B, hip hop, drum n' bass, and qawwali such as that being created by Nusrat Fateh Ali Khan. He released one of his first compositions for JoSH, "Main Hoon Tanha", which ended up being the title track for their eight track debut album released in 2001. JoSH's second album, Kabhi was released in 2003 and awarded the MTV India's 2004 "Immie" award for Best New Non-Film Artist. In 2006, Josh released the 11 track album Mausam in 2006 that included the songs "Mahi Ve", "Rock Your World", and "Nasha Payar Da".

After a 5-year hiatus, Josh returned with their fourth album Beyond Kismat, which included the songs "Pyar Hogaya" and "Achi Ajeeb Ho Tum".

Josh has collaborated with Grammy winner Nelly Furtado with bhangra remixes of her singles "Powerless (Say What You Want)" (2003), "Promiscuous" (2006), and "Maneater" (2006). They were also featured in Nelly Furtado's tour in India.

In 2011, Hussain was appointed the music director for the Pakistani film, Rangreza. He is the voice of lead character, Bilal Ashraf, in the film, while performing four songs. In July, Hussain collaborated with the singer Komal Rizvi on a reworking of the song "Desan Da Raja", which was originally sung by Naseem Begum for the 1959 film Kartar Singh.

Qurram is married to Saima Chaudhry, and has a son named Keyaan Karim and a daughter named Inaara. He resides in Toronto, Canada, and is of Pakistani descent.

He won the Canadian Screen Award for Best Original Song at the 12th Canadian Screen Awards in 2024 for "Ishq Ki Na Koi Bhi Hud Hai", a song he contributed to the film The Queen of My Dreams.

== See also ==
- Rup Magon
