= Syed Anwar Husain =

Bangladeshi academic and historian (born 1947)

- সৈয়দ আনোয়ার হোসেন
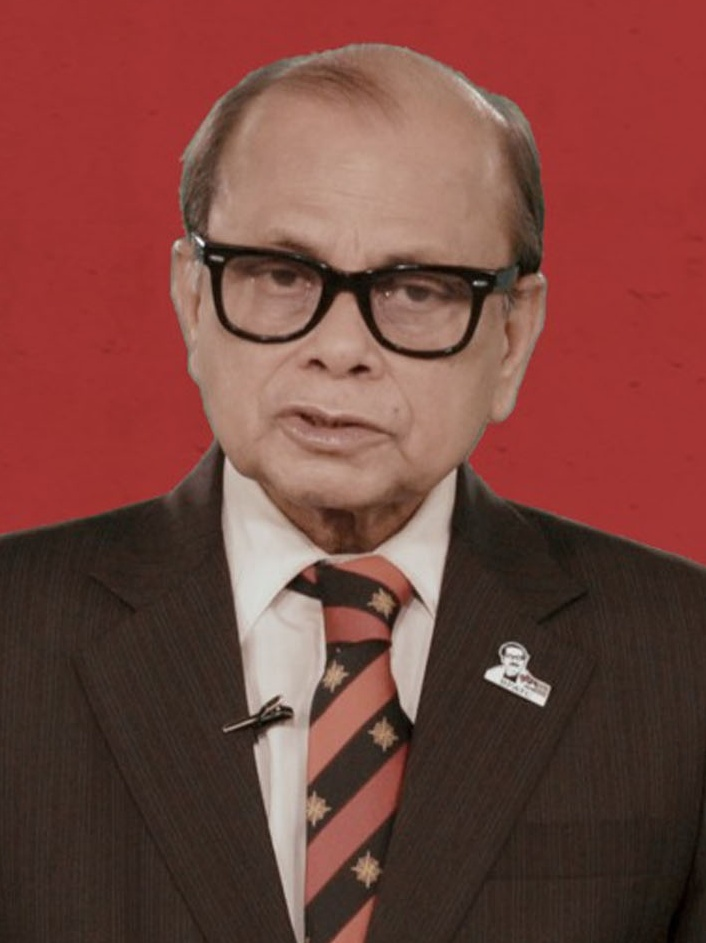
- Husain in 2021

Director General of Bangla Academy
- In office 17 February 1997 – 16 February 2001
- Preceded by: Abul Mansur Muhammad Abu Musa
- Succeeded by: Rafiqul Islam

Vice-Chancellor of Darul Ihsan University
- In office 2004–2005
- Preceded by: Syed Ali Ahsan

Personal details
- Born: 5 November 1947 (age 78) Bogra District, Rajshahi Division, Dominion of Pakistan
- Education: University of Dhaka; University of Edinburgh; University of London; University of California, Berkeley

Syed Anwar Husain (Bengali: সৈয়দ আনোয়ার হোসেন; 5 November 1947) is a Bangladeshi academic and historian. He is a former director general of the Bangla Academy. He is the president of the Bangladesh Itihas Samiti.

== Early life and education ==
Husain was born on 5 November 1947 to a Bengali Muslim family of Syeds from the Bogra District in Rajshahi Division, Dominion of Pakistan. He has a bachelor's and master's from the University of Dhaka. He also has a master's in international history from the University of Edinburgh. He completed his PhD from University of London in British administrative history. He studied at the University of California, Berkeley on a Fulbright scholarship.

== Career ==
Husain joined the University of Dhaka in 1970 as a lecturer in the Department of History. He was promoted to professor in 1985. From 1993 to 1996, he served as the chairperson of the Department of History at the University of Dhaka. He was the director general of Bangla Academy from 1997 to 2001.

From 2004 to 2005, he worked as the vice-chancellor of Darul Ihsan University. He was a visiting professor at the American University, Columbia University, and University of Pennsylvania. He retired from the University of Dhaka in 2014 and was appointed a supernumerary professor there. He was awarded the Ekushey Padak in 2009.

From 2010 to 2012, he was the founder editor of Daily Sun. He is the Bangabandhu Chair at the Bangladesh University of Professionals.
