= Superstar (2019 film) =

2019 Pakistani film by Mohammed Ehteshamuddin

- Theatrical release poster
- Directed by: Mohammed Ehteshamuddin
- Screenplay by: Azaan Sami Khan
- Produced by: Momina Duraid
- Starring: Mahira Khan; Bilal Ashraf
- Music by: Azaan Sami Khan & Saad Sultan
- Production company: Momina & Duraid Films
- Distributed by: Hum Films
- Release dates: 6 August 2019 (Premiere); 12 August 2019 (Eid al-Adha)
- Running time: 135 minutes
- Country: Pakistan
- Language: Urdu
- Budget: Rs. 15 crore (US$540,000)
- Box office: Rs. 30 crore (US$1.1 million)

Superstar is a 2019 Pakistani romantic, musical-drama film, starring Bilal Ashraf and Mahira Khan. It is directed by Mohammed Ehteshamuddin, produced by Momina & Duraid Films, and the music and screenplay are by Azaan Sami Khan. The story of the film follows Noori (played by Mahira Khan), who works in a theatre run by her uncle Agha Jan (played by Nadeem Baig), her entry into films and her romance and betrayal. The principal photography of the film began in March 2019. It was released on the occasion of Eid al-Adha on 12 August 2019 by Hum Films under Momina & Duraid Films.

== Plot ==
The story is about Noori, a struggling theatre actress who dreams of working in film. She has been doing adverts alongside theatre work. One day, she is scheduled to appear in an advertisement alongside Sameer. While the crew wait for him, Noori practises with props and costumes backstage. Sameer sees her and is attracted to her. During the shoot, however, the director disapproves of Noori's performance and asks her to leave. Sameer insists that he will only work if Noori is taken back. Eventually, they start going out together. However, Noori's life takes a turn and she has to choose between family and her career.

== Cast ==
- Mahira Khan as Noori
- Bilal Ashraf as Sameer Khan
- Alizeh Shah as Chutki
- Nadeem Baig as Saleem Malik alias Agha Jaan
  - Wahaj Ali as Young Saleem Malik
- Jawed Sheikh as Zulfiqar Khan
- Marina Khan as Laila Khan
  - Syra Yousuf as Laila Khan (young)
- Asma Abbas as Choti Ammi
- Saife Hassan as Zahid Malik
- Ali Kazmi as Shaan
- Waqar Hussain as Bobby

=== Special appearances ===
- Kubra Khan
- Hania Aamir
- Osman Khalid Butt
- Ahad Raza Mir
- Wahaj Ali
- Mani
- Fahim Burney
- Adnan Shah Tipu
- Humayun Saeed

== Production ==
The film was announced in August 2018 by producer Momina Duraid. She stated that her next film titled Superstar, starring Mahira Khan and Bilal Ashraf, was to be directed by Ehtishamuddin on the screenplay of Azaan Sami Khan was at the pre-production stage. In an interview she said that Azaan who has written the screenplay was behind the project. She added, "It’s a genre that hasn’t been made in Pakistan yet, very theatrical and something I had been wanting to do for a while.”

Filming began in March 2019. The lead actress, Mahira Khan, shared pictures from the set on her Instagram account.

== Marketing and release ==
The official trailer of the film was released by Hum TV on 15 July 2019. It garnered 4 million views since its release on YouTube. The official teaser of the song "Ghalat Fehmi" was launched by Hum TV on 25 July 2019. It garnered 6 million views since its release on YouTube.

Superstar has been certified with a runtime of 135 mins by the British Board of Film Classification and was released theatrically on Eid al-Adha, on 12 August 2019 by Hum Films under Momina & Duraid Films.

== Soundtrack ==
Superstar

Soundtrack album by Azaan Sami Khan and Saad Sultan
- Released: 9 August 2019
- Recorded: 2019
- Genre: Feature film soundtrack
- Language: Urdu
- Label: Hum Films
- Producer: Shafaat Ali
External audio
- Video song on YouTube
- Audio song on SoundCloud

The music of the film is composed by Azaan Sami Khan and Saad Sultan. While the lyrics are by Shakeel Sohail, the qawwali lyrics are by A. M. Turaz in the song "Ghalat Fehmi".

Track listing
No.	Title	Lyrics	Music	Singer(s)	Length
1.	"Bekaraan"	Shakeel Sohail	Azaan Sami Khan, Saad Sultan	Ali Sethi, Zeb Bangash	4:10
2.	"In Dinon"	Shakeel Sohail	Azaan Sami Khan	Atif Aslam	4:10
3.	"Noori"	Shakeel Sohail	Azaan Sami Khan	Sunidhi Chauhan, Jabar Abbas	3:30
4.	"Ghalat Fehmi"	Shakeel Sohail, Qawwali lyrics by A. M. Turaz	Azaan Sami Khan and Saad Sultan	Asim Azhar, Zenab Fatimah Sultan	4:26
5.	"Dharak Bharak"	Shakeel Sohail	Azaan Sami Khan	Shiraz Uppal and Raktima Mukherjee	2:13
6.	"Doston"	Shakeel Sohail	Azaan Sami Khan and Saad Sultan	Mustahsan Khan and Mustafa Zahid	1:50
7.	"Anjaana"	Shakeel Sohail	Azaan Sami Khan and Saad Sultan	Atif Aslam	3:04

== Reception ==
=== Box office ===
The film grossed Rs. 2 crores in its opening day in Pakistan taking its total 2 days collection to Rs. 4 crores. The film collected a total of Rs. 6.3 crore at the domestic box office and a total of Rs. 5.1 crore from overseas markets. Its worldwide box office collection as of 14 August was Rs. 11.4 crore.

After 7 days, the film had grossed Rs. 13.2 crore domestically. As of 23 August 2019 its worldwide gross stood at Rs. 21.15 crore. As of September 4, Superstar has collected 20.5 crores from Pakistan and 6.41 crores from overseas for a total of 26.91 crores. Superstar became the highest grossing Pakistani film of 2019. The film in its lifetime run managed to cross PKR 300 Million on local and international box office both.

=== Critical response ===
Hassan Kazmi of Masala.com rated the film 4 out of 5 stars and stated, "Mahira Khan and Bilal Ashraf have blown away everyone with how good they are in this film with excellent music and screenplay from Azaan Sami Khan". He further mentioned, "it has some of the best acting performances, brilliant music, and remarkably executed storyline. Director Mohammed Ehtehshaamuddin deserves every bit of the praises for this wonderful jewel". Shahjehan Saleem of Diva Magazine Pakistan rating the film 4 out of 5 stars, praised it for its cinematography and overall acting skills and stated, "While both Bilal and Mahira in the past have received critique over their acting skills, Superstar will prove to be the turning point in their careers. Bilal especially has overshadowed everyone in the film." He further added, "Superstar is definitely not a typical Pakistani movie made these days. It has a soul in it. Kudos to the director Ehteshamuddin."

Aamna Haider Isani of Something Haute rated 4/5 stars and remarked, "Superstar is like a well cut and perfectly polished diamond that sparkles from every angle". She further stated that, "This is Mahira at her phenomenally best, and this should put all naysayers and critics to rest". She also praised Bilal Ashraf and wrote, "Bilal Ashraf is the dark horse of the movie". She concluded by saying, "One can go on and on about the strengths of the film but conclusively, not wanting to give anything away, I do have to say that Superstar is one of the best Pakistani films I have ever seen".

Yousuf Mehmood of Pakistani Cinema.net rated the film 3/5 and wrote, "Subtle nods to the film industry of yesterday, clever dialogues, charming details, an overall freshness to the script despite a formula we’ve seen a hundred times, and some great performances by Mahira Khan and Nadeem Baig, give the film the emotional weight it needs to resonate with the masses.". Mohammed Kamran Jawaid of Dawn gave a positive review by stating, "With its emotion-raising climax, director Ehteshamuddin’s Superstar is an intelligently crafted film that has only a few snags"

Shafiq-ul-Hassan of The Express Tribune Blogs rated 3.5/5 stars and praised the performances, direction and writing thoroughly and remarked, "It won’t be wrong to say that Superstar is one of Mahira’s best performances since Humsafar" and concluded by writing, "On the basis of content, performance, storytelling and music, Superstar is a brilliant entertainer". Asjad Khan of Oye Yeah heavily praised Mahira Khan's performance and wrote, "To surmise, Superstar is an uncomplicated but dreamy love story with excellent performances, and beautiful music". Omair Alavi of Box Office Insights rated 4/5 stars and wrote, "On the whole, Superstar is a film that is time to perfection for the audience". He further added, " The combo of Ehteshamuddin and Mustafa Afridi also guarantees quality writing and direction which is their specialty, and with Superstar they have entered filmdom, hopefully for good".

Rafay Mehmood of The Express Tribune rated 2.5/5 stars and criticised it by writing, "Despite some very creative blocking choices by Ehtesham and relatable incidents within the context of Pakistan’s film industry, Superstar, to repeat the same old story, is a film flawed on paper. Don’t confuse it for being a bad story, in fact, it has a semblance of a story which is a big deal by Pakistani standards. However, the film as a whole is unsure about what it wants to be and that is perhaps its curse." Sonia Ashraf of Images Dawn giving a mixed review stated, "Not only did it humanise the industry, it was a nice break from the desperate attempts at wacky plot twists aimed to shock the audience. Superstar is a simple love story and there's nothing wrong with that. Had the treatment been better, the script detailed, this would've been the film of the year".

Omair Alavi further writing for Hum Spotlight remarked, "The verdict is out – Mahira Khan’s Superstar makes you fall in love again". Writing for Brandsynario he rated the film 4/5 stars and stated, "There are films that inspire and films that lead, and then there is SUPERSTAR that does both. Mahira Khan's latest is probably her best work so far, even better than Raees".

== Accolades ==
Year	Ceremony	Category	Recipient	Result
2020	1st Pakistan International Screen Awards	Best Film		Nominated
2020	1st Pakistan International Screen Awards	Best Director	Mohammed Ehteshamuddin	Nominated
2020	1st Pakistan International Screen Awards	Best Actor	Bilal Ashraf	Nominated
2020	1st Pakistan International Screen Awards	Best Actress	Mahira Khan	Won
2020	1st Pakistan International Screen Awards	Best Supporting Actor	Ali Kazmi	Nominated
2020	1st Pakistan International Screen Awards	Best Supporting Actress	Alizeh Shah	Nominated
2020	1st Pakistan International Screen Awards	Best Song	Asim Azhar	Nominated
2020	1st Pakistan International Screen Awards	Best Cinematography	Khizar Idrees	Nominated
2020	1st Pakistan International Screen Awards	Best Music	Azaan Sami khan	Won
2020	19th Lux Style Awards	Best Film		Nominated
2020	19th Lux Style Awards	Best Film Director	Mohammed Ehteshamuddin	Nominated
2020	19th Lux Style Awards	Best Film Actor	Nadeem Baig	Nominated
2020	19th Lux Style Awards	Best Film Actress- Viewer's Choice	Mahira Khan	Won
2020	19th Lux Style Awards	Best Film Actress- Critic's Choice	Mahira Khan	Won
2020	19th Lux Style Awards	Best Playback Singer	Ali Sethi (Song: Bekaraan)	Nominated

== See also ==
- List of Pakistani films of 2019
