= Syed Ali Ashraf =

Bangladeshi Islamic scholar and academic

- সৈয়দ আলী আশরফ

Personal life
- Born: 30 January 1924 Dacca, Bengal Presidency
- Died: 7 August 1998 (aged 74) Dhaka, Bangladesh
- Education: Dacca University; Fitzwilliam College, Cambridge
- Relatives: Syed Ali Ahsan (brother); Syed Sajjad Hussain (cousin)

Religious life
- Religion: Islam
- Denomination: Sunni

Vice-Chancellor of Darul Ihsan University
- In office 1989 – 7 August 1998
- Succeeded by: Syed Ali Ahsan

Syed Ali Ashraf (30 January 1924 – 7 August 1998) was a Bangladeshi-born Islamic scholar and academic. He was the Professor of English and Head of the Department of English, Karachi University, and later became Director-General, World Centre for Islamic Education at Jeddah, Saudi Arabia in 1980. He was also the founder and director-general of Islamic Academy, Cambridge. He was also the founder vice-chancellor of Darul Ihsan University from its founding to before his death in 1998 in Bangladesh.

== Early life and family ==
Ashraf was born on 30 January 1924 in Dacca, Bengal Province. He belonged to a Bengali Muslim family of Syeds originally from the village of Alokdia in Magura (formerly under Jessore District), Bengal Province. His father, Syed Ali Hamed, was a school inspector. His mother, Syeda Kamrunnegar Khatun, was the daughter of Syed Mukarram Ali, the Zamindar and Pir of Agla in Nawabganj, Dhaka. His brothers were academic and poet Syed Ali Ahsan, and university professor Syed Ali Naqi. He grew up in an atmosphere steeped in Sufi traditions inherited from both his paternal and maternal ancestors.

== Education ==
He obtained his master's degree in English from the University of Dhaka and his Honours and PhD in English literature from Fitzwilliam College, Cambridge.

== Career ==
He started out teaching at a university in what is now Bangladesh. He went on to hold the following positions:

- Lecturer and Reader in English at Dacca University (1949)
- Head of the Department of English at University of Rajshahi (1954–56)
- Professor and Head of the Department of English at University of Karachi (1956–73)
- Professor and Head of the Department of English at King Abdulaziz University, Mecca (1974–77)
- Professor at King Abdulaziz University, Jeddah (1977–84)
- Visiting professor at Harvard University (1971)
- Visiting Professor University of New Brunswick (1974)

== Works ==
He was a distinguished author and editor, and has written as well as edited several books and many articles. Some of them include:

- Crisis in Muslim Education, 1979, London: Hodder and Stoughton (Syed Ali Ashraf and Syed Sajjad Husain eds.)
- New Horizons in Muslim Education, 1985, London: Hodder and Stoughton
- Islam – Teacher's Manual – The Westhill Project, 1989, Leckhamptom: Stanley Thomas
- Religion and Education: Islamic and Christian Approaches, 1994, Cambridge: Islamic Academy (Syed Ali Ashraf and Paul H. Hirst eds.)
