= HSY (disambiguation) =

HSY may refer to:

- Hassan Sheheryar Yasin, Pakistani fashion designer
  - HSY Studio, his fashion label
- Hellenic Shipyards Co., a Greek shipyard
- The Hershey Company, an American chocolatier
- Horsley railway station, in England
