= Shahpar (TV series) =

Pakistani television series

- شہپر
- Written by: Mustansar Hussain Tarar
- Directed by: Qaiser Farooq; Syed Shakir Uzair
- Country of origin: Pakistan
- Original language: Urdu
- No. of episodes: 6

Original release
- Network: PTV
- Release: 1997 – 1997

Shahpar is a Pakistani television series, based on the lives of Pakistan Air Force (PAF) cadets, first broadcast on Pakistan Television Corporation in 1997. It is directed by Qaiser Farooq and Syed Shakir Uzair, and written by Mustansar Hussain Tarar. The series chronicles the journey of three cadet fighter pilots played by Faisal Rehman and real-life Pakistan Air Force officers, Flight Lieutenant Sarfaraz Usman and Flight Lieutenant Arif Kazmi.

The soundtrack of the series was sung by Najam Sheraz. The script of the series was later made available as a book.

== Plot ==
Umer, Usman and Hassan, three air force cadet friends, talk about their passing out ceremony, being held the following day. Hassan becomes sad on realising that no one from his family will be attending as his parents have died. On the day of the ceremony, Mohsin meets his mother and inquiries about the disappearance of his father, a flight lieutenant who had gone missing during a combat mission. Umer goes out to the house of his father's friend who lives near the academy. He lives with her daughter whose only passion is to grow vegetables by modern techniques. Umer develops a great bond with them and returns to the academy while promising to bring his friends there one day.

== Cast ==
- Rizwan Ullah Khan as Officer Commanding No. 11 Squadron PAF, (mirroring his real-life position at the time)
- Flight lieutenant Sarfaraz Usman as Mohsin
  - Usama Aziz as young Mohsin
- Flight lieutenant Arif Kazmi as Umer
- Faisal Rehman as Hassan
- Tazeen Hussain as Seema
- Zahra Farooq as Zaryab
- Saima Shafiq as Saima
- Shamim Hilaly as Mohsin's mother
- Ainne Hali as Flight Lieutenant Aysha
- Rubina Badar as Mrs. Jehangir
- Flight Lieutenant Ahmad Mohsin as Tanvir
- Flying officer Muzamil Jibran as Mubashir
- Flight Lieutenant Sharaf Ali as Sharaf
- Jalal Malik as Azam Khan
- Jahangir Khan as Khalid Saif ul Islam
- Abid Majeed as Baba Nazar
- Wing Commander Jamshed as Office commander F-7
- Squadron leader Mujeeb Bhagiyo as Flight commander
