= Muhammad Abdul Bari (academic) =

Bangladeshi academic (1930–2003)

- মুহাম্মাদ আব্দুল বারী

Vice-chancellor of Rajshahi University
- In office 19 July 1971 – 8 January 1972
- Preceded by: Syed Sajjad Hussain
- Succeeded by: Khan Sarwar Murshid
- In office 7 July 1977 – 17 February 1981
- Preceded by: Syed Ali Ahsan
- Succeeded by: Maqbular Rahman Sarkar

Vice-chancellor of Bangladesh National University
- In office 21 October 1992 – 20 October 1996
- Preceded by: Position established
- Succeeded by: Aminul Islam

Personal details
- Born: 1930 Syedpur, Bogra District, Bengal Presidency
- Died: 4 June 2003 (aged 72–73)
- Parent: Muhammad Abdullahil Baqi (father)
- Relatives: Muhammad Abdullahil Kafi

Muhammad Abdul Bari (1930 – 4 June 2003) was a Bangladeshi academic, linguist and Islamic scholar.

== Background and education ==
Abdul Bari was born in 1930, to a Bengali Muslim family in the village of Syedpur in Shibganj, Bogra District, Bengal Province. His grandfather, Sayed Abdul Hadi, had founded the village of Nurul Huda in Dinajpur and was one of the pioneers of the Ahl-i Hadith movement in Bengal. His father, Muhammad Abdullahil Baqi, was the vice-president of Muslim League, a member of Bengal Legislative Assembly, Pakistan General Assembly and East-Pakistan Legislative Council.

Abdul Bari passed the Islamic intermediate examination from Dhaka Intermediate Government College (now Kazi Nazrul Islam College) in 1946. He completed his bachelor's and master's in Arabic from the University of Dhaka in 1949 and 1950 respectively. He then moved to Oxford University to conduct research under the two orientalists professor Hamilton Alexander Rosskeen Gibb and professor Joseph Schacht. He obtained the DPhil degree in 1953.

== Career ==
Abdul Bari served as a teacher during 1954–1977 and as an academic administrator during 1977–1996. He was appointed the vice-chancellor of Rajshahi University twice in 1971 and in 1977 and of Bangladesh National University in 1992. He was also the chairman of Bangladesh University Grants Commission during 1981–1989. He was head member of Islamic University establishing Planning Committee in January 1977.

== Awards ==
- Nilkanta Sarkar Gold Medal
- Bahrul Ulum Ubaidi Suhrawardi Gold Medal
- Dhaka University Gold Medal
- President's Gold Medal (1969)
