= Mian Hamid Yasin =

Pakistani politician

Mian Hamid Yasin MNA

Member of the National Assembly of Pakistan
- In office 1972–1977

Personal details
- Party: Pakistan Peoples Party
- Relations: Hassan Sheheryar Yasin (son)

Mian Hamid Yasin (died 2022) was a Pakistani politician who had been a member of the National Assembly of Pakistan between 1972 and 1977. He was the father of Pakistani fashion designer and host Hassan Sheheryar Yasin.

Yasin was elected to the National Assembly of Pakistan from NW-67 Shekhupura-II as a candidate of Pakistan Peoples Party (PPP) in the 1970 Pakistani general election.

Yasin died in 2022.
