= Maria B =

Pakistani clothing brand

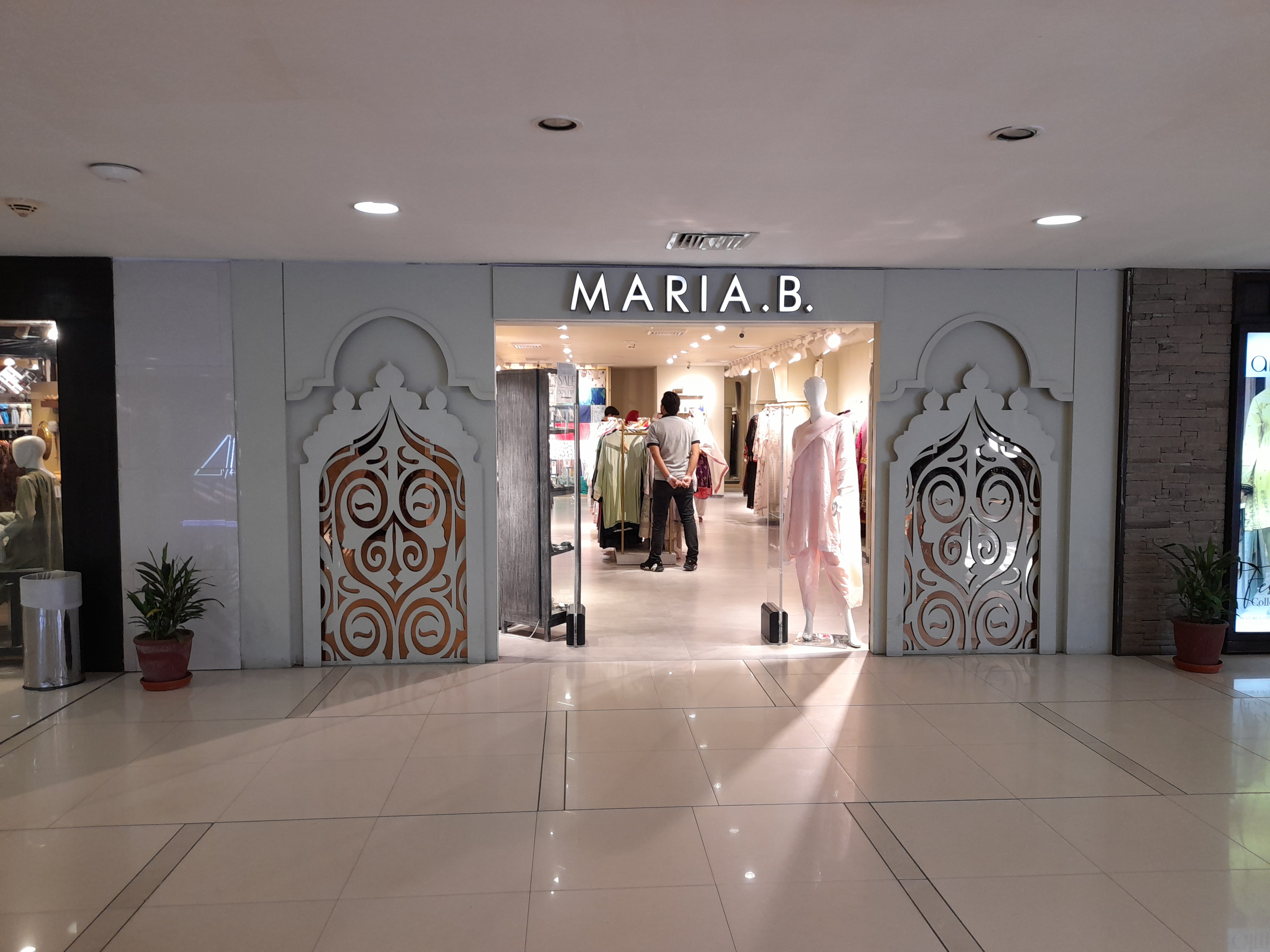
- Maria B outlet at Dolmen Mall
- Type: Private
- Industry: Fashion
- Founded: 1999 (27 years ago) in Lahore, Pakistan
- Founder: Maria Butt
- Headquarters: Lahore, Pakistan
- Number of locations: 38 (as of 2025)
- Area served: Pakistan
- Key people: Maria Butt (CEO)
- Products: Clothing, accessories
- Owner: Maria Butt
- Number of employees: 860 (2024)
- Website: mariab.pk

Maria B (Note: ماریہ بی) stylized as Maria.B., is a Pakistani clothing and accessories brand based in Lahore. Its product lines include ready-to-wear, footwear, accessories, jewelry, and home decoration. It is based in Lahore, Pakistan. It has outlets all over the country.

== History ==
Founding

Maria B was founded in 1999 by Maria Butt, a graduate of the Pakistan Institute of Fashion and Design, in Lahore.

== Controversy ==
Designer Maria B, whose real name is Maria Butt, sent a Rs100 million defamation notice to Turkish influencer Türkan Atay, who publicly accused her of failing to pay her in full for a brand shoot in Turkey earlier this year. Atay issued a legal notice to Maria Butt for 401,130 Turkish liras and a formal apology.

== Collections ==
=== Swarovski prêt-à-porter collection ===
In 2016, Maria B became the first designer in Pakistan who incorporated the Austrian-based global leader of crystals Swarovski in their embroidered, chiffon and lawn collections. They signed their deal in 2014 with the Austrian giant.

The collection was launched on 27 August 2016.

== Other Specialities ==
Maria B is known for the following lines:

- Mkids
- MPrints
- Evening Wear
- Lawn
- Linen
- MBasics
- Mbroidered
- Maria B Jewellery
- Maria B Perfumes
- Sateen
- Silk
- Eid Lawn
- Casuals
- Couture
- Bridals
