= Khaab Toot Jaatay Hain =

Pakistani television series

- Genre: Period drama Political drama
- Based on: The Wastes of Times by Syed Sajjad Hussain
- Written by: Amjad Islam Amjad
- Directed by: Mohammed Ehteshamuddin
- Country of origin: Pakistan
- Original languages: Urdu; Bengali
- No. of episodes: 4

Production
- Executive producer: Momina Duraid
- Producers: Mohammad Ehteshamuddin; Bilal Ashraf

Original release
- Network: Hum TV
- Release: 27 December 2021 – 17 January 2022

Khaab Toot Jaatay Hain (transl. Dreams fall apart) is a Pakistani television historical drama miniseries co-produced by Bilal Ashraf and Mohammed Ehteshamuddin under banner Behive Transmedia. The series is based on the book The Wastes of Times by Syed Sajjad Hussain, who was vice chancellor in Dhaka University in the 1970s. The story follows his memoirs about the Fall of Dhaka. The screenplay is written by Amjad Islam Amjad. The series started airing weekly on Hum TV on 27 December 2021.

== Plot ==
The story unfolds through the eyes of Professor Dr. Syed Sajjad Hussain, the former Vice-Chancellor of Dhaka University, as he recounts his experiences from his jail cell in Dhaka Central Jail. The narrative follows his perilous journey from Rajshahi to Dhaka, driven by his unwavering belief in a united Pakistan. This stance puts him at odds with his faculty colleagues and Bengali activists, notably Professor Anand. As the tale unfolds, it vividly depicts the bloodshed, violence, and chaos that ultimately led to the separation of East Pakistan and the birth of Bangladesh.

== Cast ==
- Mohammed Ehteshamuddin as Professor Syed Sajjad Hussain
- Nadeem Baig as Education secretary general
- Kulsoom Aftab as Mrs. Sajjad
- Peerzada Salman
- Noor ul Hassan as Professor Aanand
- Syed Mohammad Ahmed as Chief of Police
- Saleem Mairaj as Doctor
- Eman Ahmed as younger daughter of Sajjad
- Hania Ahmed as elder daughter of Sajjad
- Noreen Gulwani as University student from West Pakistan
- Saad Fareedi as Separatist of Mukti Bahini
- Sunil Shankar as Separatist of Mukti Bahini
- Ali Rizvi
- Sharjil Baloch
- Nazar ul Hassan
- Hammad Siddique
- Manan Hameed
- Shabir Bhatti

== Production ==
The series is based on the book The Wastes of Times by Dr. Sajid Hussain which is about his memos about the events of Fall of Dhaka. The screenplay is written by famous poet and author Amjad Islam Amjad. The series marked his return on television as a writer after several years as he wrote classic plays such as Waris and Dehleez for the television back in 1970s to 1990s.

In September 2021, Bilal Ashraf announced that he will venture into production with his newly found "Behive Transmedia", a production house that he co-owns along with filmmaker and actor, Mohammed Ehteshamuddin. Thus, the series marks Ashraf's debut as a producer. It also marks Ehteshamuddin's return on television as a director after period-drama Aangan (2018) and as an actor after Yaqeen Ka Safar (2017).

== Soundtracks ==
Track list
No.	Title	Singer(s)	Length
1.	"Naye Hain Rastay"	Shuja Haider
2.	"Raahi"	Sami Khan
3.	"Dhukka Chaand"	Shanzay Faryal, Aleezay Nisar, Muqaddas Azeem

== See also ==
- Mujib: The Making of a Nation
