= Aik Hai Nigar =

Pakistani telefilm

- Television release poster
- Urdu: اک ہے نگار
- Genre: Biography; Drama
- Based on: Nigar Johar
- Screenplay by: Umera Ahmad
- Directed by: Adnan Sarwar
- Starring: Mahira Khan; Bilal Ashraf
- Country of origin: Pakistan
- Original language: Urdu

Production
- Producers: Nina Kashif; Mahira Khan
- Running time: 100 minutes
- Production company: Soul Fry Films

Original release
- Network: ARY Digital
- Release: 23 October 2021

Aik Hai Nigar is a Pakistani television biographical-drama film based on the three-star general of the Pakistan Army, Nigar Johar, and centers on her life and career from 1975 (when Johar was young) to the present time. The telefilm is directed by Adnan Sarwar, written by Umera Ahmad, and first aired on ARY Digital on 23 October 2021. The telefilm marked the Mahira Khan's debut as a producer, who also played the title role in the film. It also stars Bilal Ashraf in his television debut as Johar's husband. The telefilm was well-received by the audience and received mixed reviews from critics.

== Plot ==
Nigar Johar is a girl who aspires to be big. Even though she has to face hardships of misogyny and personal despair, Nigar is determined to achieve her goal in life. Along the journey, she meets her life partner, Johar Ali Khan, who encourages her to pursue her career goal and make history.

== Cast ==
- Mahira Khan as Nigar Johar
  - Anoosheh Rania Khan as young Nigar (child star)
- Bilal Ashraf as Johar Ali Khan, Nigar's Husband
- Khushhal Khan as Shahid, Nigar's Brother
- Sohail Sameer as Nigar's Father
- Dr Sarah Nadeem as Nigar's mother
- Tauqeer Nasir as Qamar Javed Bajwa
- Iman Shahid

== Soundtrack ==
The music of the telefilm is composed by Haroon Shahid, while Abbas Ali Khan is the music producer.

Track listing
No.	Title	Lyrics	Singer(s)	Length
1.	"Pyar Tera"	Haroon Shahid	Haroon Shahid, Lalarukh Abbas Ali Khan	3:26
2.	"Mitti/Judai Sahi na jaye"	Haroon Shahid	Haroon Shahid	3:45

== Reception ==
On television broadcast, the telefilm received 5.2 TRPs at its timeslot.

The telefilm mostly received positive reviews from critics, with major praise towards the acting performances. A review in The News International praised Khan's acting performance and the heartwarming portrayal of the relationships. The Express Tribune criticized the film's narrative and shallow depiction on Johar's life, stating, "The film lacks severely in the narrative department, which couldn't have been salvaged by the cast even if they tried".

== See also ==
- Ek Thi Marium
