= Firasat =

- Directed by: Atta Shah Hoti
- Written by: K. Khan
- Produced by: Atta Shah Hoti
- Starring: Khursheed Khan; Atta Shah Hoti; Parveen; Jehangir Adil; Bi Bi Shireena; Badar Munir; Nasir Khan; Arshad Khan; Wahid Khan
- Edited by: Yellow Chillies Entertainment
- Production company: ASK Media Production & ESK Studio
- Release date: June 25, 2017
- Running time: 156 min
- Language: Pashto

Firasat is a 2017 Pashto action and thriller film made by Atta Shah Hoti. The film stars Khursheed Khan, Parveen and Atta Shah Hoti in lead roles. It will release on 25 June 2017 in cinemas under the production banner of ASK Media Production and ESK Studio.

== Cast ==
- Khursheed Khan
- Atta Shah Hoti
- Parveen
- Jehangir Adil
- Bi Bi Shireena
- Badar Munir
- Nasir Khan
- Arshad Khan
- Wahid Khan

== See also ==
- List of Pakistani films of 2017
