= Yalghaar =

- Teaser poster
- Urdu: یلغار
- Directed by: Hassan Rana
- Written by: Hassan Rana
- Screenplay by: Iman Ali
- Produced by: Hassan Rana; Syed Mujtaba Tirmizi; Inter-Services Public Relations
- Starring: Shaan Shahid; Humayun Saeed; Adnan Siddiqui; Bilal Ashraf; Armeena Khan; Gohar Rasheed; Ayesha Omer; Ayub Khoso; Uzma Khan; Ali Rehman Khan
- Cinematography: Waleed Ughur
- Music by: Syed Ali Hafeez
- Production company: MindWorks Media
- Distributed by: Hum Films; Sony Pictures
- Release date: 26 June 2017
- Running time: 158 minutes
- Country: Pakistan
- Language: Urdu

Yalghaar (English: "Assault" or "Attack"; previously known as Delta Echo Foxtrot) is a 2017 Pakistani war epic film directed by Hassan Rana. The film is produced by MindWorks Media and is based on the true story of Pakistan Army's Swat Operation against Tehrik-e-Taliban militants. Yalghaar was facilitated by Brigadier Syed Mujtaba Tirmizi from Inter-Services Public Relations (ISPR).

The film "explores what happens in the lives of those involved, including the militants, and how all of them are affected at a personal level because of the ongoing operation". It stars Shaan Shahid in the lead role, along with Humayun Saeed, Adnan Siddiqui, Armeena Khan, Aleeze Nasser, Ayesha Omer, Sana Bucha, and Bilal Ashraf. It is the most expensive Pakistani movie to date. Apart from budget and extensive cast, the film features 150 written characters. On 19 December 2014, Hassan Waqas Rana said his film was a tribute to the children slain by terrorists in the 2014 Peshawar school attack.

== Plot ==
The film is based on an actual military operation conducted in the Piochar region of Swat district.

== Cast ==
- Shaan Shahid as Colonel Asad in Special Services Group of Pakistan Army
- Humayun Saeed as Torjan - A Militant leader of the local area who has established himself as an Ameer of the area
- Adnan Siddiqui as Lt Col. Imran
- Bilal Ashraf as Capt. Bilal (SSG)
- Ahmad Taha Ghani as Capt. Asif - Combat Group Pilot Pakistan Army
- Wali Yousaf as Capt. Abdullah - Combat Group Pilot Pakistan Army
- Ali Rehman Khan as Capt. Ali - A technical expert who conducts location from army headquarter
- Ali Sohail as Capt. Asif - A technical expert who conducts location from army headquarter
- Sana Bucha as Sadia - A Reporter, and love interest of Col. Asad
- Aleeze Nasser as Fareeha - Wife of Lt Col. Imran
- Armeena Khan as Jero
- Uzma Khan as Capt. Samia - A Military Doctor
- Ayesha Omer as Zarmina
- Gohar Rasheed as Baran
- Syed Irfan Gilani as DG MI Sohail - Military Intelligence Director General.
- Hassan Rana as Maj. General Hassan
- Ashir Azeem as Maj. General Ahmed
- Talib Rizvi as Maj. General Taimur
- Ayub Khosa as Colonel Jogezai
- Sikander Rizvi as Azhar
- Zarrar Azeem as Capt. Zarrar
- Umair Jaswal as Capt. Umair (cameo appearance)

== Production ==
=== Development ===
Soon after the release of Waar back in 2013, Hassan Rana signed two more films with ARY Films, a sequel to Waar known as Waar 2 and Delta Echo Foxtrot, later known as Yalghaar. ISPR was approached in order to get more insight into the facts and figures of the Swat Operation. Hassan Rana wanted to know how it feels to be a soldier who is fighting on the front lines of war.

The movie went into production after about 3 years of extensive research. Apart from using a vast number of choppers and heavy ammunition, an artificial tunnel was dug in Karachi to replicate one found in North Waziristan.

In preparation for their roles, all actors spent time with their real-life alter egos. Humayun Saeed, who plays the role of a militant, spent days with captured militants in order to prepare for his role.

Duraid Qureshi, the CEO of Hum Network Limited announced at the 4th Hum Awards that the film will be distributed under the banner of Hum Films.

== Release ==
Yalghaar was officially released on 25 June 2017 coinciding with Eid al-Fitr holiday. It was also released in 22 countries at the same time including United States, UK, and UAE.

== Reception ==
=== Box office ===
The film collected Rs 1.75 crores on day 1, Rs 2.40 crore on day 2 and Rs 2.20 crore on day 3.

=== Critical reception ===
Rafay Mahmood of The Express Tribune said that the film had its "heart in the right place", depicting "what an average soldier goes through in order to serve his country while taking care of his friends, love life and family" while "engaged on two different fronts with two different kinds of enemies — external and internal." However, he criticized the film's loose plot, describing it as an "omelette", as well as forced English dialogues, and the director's romanticism of the "posh side of the army lifestyle". He noted that if done right, the film "had the potential to wake up the sleeping giant that the Eid box-office can be." Faraz Talat of Dawn praised the acting of Adnan Siddiqui, Sana Bucha and Ayub Khoso, but said the movie suffered from an incoherent storyline, in addition to weaknesses in choreography, dialogues, production, and certain aspects of character development. While noting Yalghaar's expensive production value, he concluded that the "film industry needs more than just patriotism; it needs a will to explore new artistic territory."

Sana Gilani of Daily Pakistan called Yalghaar "one of the most promising movies of [the] year" and viewed all characters positively, save for the female extras and the antagonist role played by Humayun Saeed, which she described as "aloof". According to Gilani, critics appeared to miss the fact that the movie relayed true events, which made the storyline and narrative obvious.

== See also ==
- List of directorial debuts
- List of Pakistani films of 2017
