= Pyari Mona =

Pakistani television series

- Original title: پیاری مونا
- Written by: Haseeb Ahmed
- Directed by: Ali Hasan
- Starring: Sanam Jung; Adeel Hussain; Mashal Khan; Adnan Jaffar; Hunbal Khan
- Opening theme: Sar Pe Mere Hai Ab Khula Aasmaan by Annural Khalid
- Composer: Adrian David Emmanuel
- Country of origin: Pakistan
- Original language: Urdu
- No. of episodes: 24

Production
- Executive producer: Momina Duraid
- Editor: Muhammad Mustafa Majeed
- Camera setup: Multi-camera
- Production company: MD Productions

Original release
- Network: Hum TV
- Release: 19 January – 6 July 2023

Pyari Mona (transl. Dear Mona) is a Pakistani television series directed by Ali Hasan. It features Sanam Jung in the titular role along with Adeel Hussain, Sabeeka Imam, Mashal Khan and Adnan Jaffar in prominent roles. It first aired on Hum TV from 19 January 2022. It focuses on body shaming and revolves around the struggle of an overweight girl.

== Plot ==
After moving from Karachi to Lahore, Mona does a number of jobs despite hailing from an affluent family and then looks for another after quitting the previous one. She wants to work as her passion but her mother doesn't like it and wants her to marry a suitable guy and is also worried due to her overweight. Her father however supports her through thick and thin and ensures she helps when she decides to come back to Karachi and start a business here.

Her worried mother and health conscious brother-in-law just see her as an overweight girl. Her fitness freak brother-in-law Babar at times controls her sister Samia as well and bullies her. She observes some health problems but ignores them due to Babar's attitude, resulting her death. After Samia's death, Mona is persuaded to marry Babar so that she can take better care of her niece, Ayaan. She gets caught in a loveless marriage while Babar on the other hand remains egoistic and self-centred despite his wife's death. He then begins an affair with a supermodel Zee with whom he works. He blames Mona again when some of his pictures with Zee go viral.

== Cast ==
- Sanam Jung as Mona Khalid
- Hunbal Khan as Irfan
- Adeel Hussain as Babar
- Sabeeka Imam as Samia
- Mashal Khan as Zee
- Uzma Beg as Shaista
- Adnan Jaffar as Khalid
- Salma Asim as Lubna
- Shaheen Khan as Irfan's mother
- Noreen Gulwani as Kinza
- Khadija Shahbaz as Ayaan

== Production ==
The first teaser of the show was released on Hum TV's official pages and was met with positive reviews for its unconventional storyline and relatable character portrayal. However, it later garnered criticism due to the casting of Sanam Jung, who is not plus size and wore a fatsuit to portray the character. Jung later gave a statement explaining as to why she wore the fat suit and clarified that she did in fact gain weight to fit the role but was restricted to 5-7kgs due to health conditions.
