= Yunhi =

2023 Pakistani television series

- Title Card
- Urdu: یونہی
- Genre: Drama; Romance
- Written by: Sarwat Nazir
- Directed by: Mohammed Ehteshamuddin
- Starring: Bilal Ashraf; Maya Ali
- Opening theme: "Yunhi" by Sami Khan & Shae Gill
- Country of origin: Pakistan
- Original language: Urdu
- No. of episodes: 34

Production
- Executive producer: Momina Duraid
- Producer: Momina Duraid
- Cinematography: Khizer Gul
- Camera setup: Multi-camera
- Running time: approx. 40 min
- Production company: MD Productions

Original release
- Network: Hum TV
- Release: 5 February – 1 October 2023

Yunhi (Urdu: یونہی, lit. 'Just so') is a 2023 Pakistani family drama television series, directed by Mohammed Ehteshamuddin, written by Sarwat Nazir, and produced by Momina Duraid under the banner MD Productions. It features Maya Ali and Bilal Ashraf in leading roles. The first episode of the series originally aired on Hum TV on 5 February 2023. The story of Yunhi revolves around a typical urban Pakistani family whose norms and outdated traditions are questioned by a USA returnee relative.

== Plot ==
Haji Karamat is the patriarch of the house where he lives with the family of his son Basharat and a divorced daughter Iqbal. His other child, Firdous lives with her family near the house. Khursheed, another daughter, died years ago due to tuberculosis after her cousin Naveed had denied marrying her. Naveed, who has now become a surgeon in the United States, returns to Pakistan to marry off his daughter Kim, who wanted to marry a non-Muslim boy in the U.S.

Naveed returns to Karamat, his uncle, and asks for forgiveness. His daughter Kaneez Fatima a.k.a. Kim experiences unfamiliar situations there such as Daniyal's concern for Suraiya's purdah and not for hers and certain other hypocritical actions. However, she gets intrigued by Basharat's elder son Dawood's getup who is a pious man and a doctor by profession. His introduction to Kim creates a rift between them. On Naveed's wish, Dawood's grandfather decides on his marriage with Kim. But he conditions that after his return he will marry Iqbal. Naveed agrees to it and Kim also agrees to marry him, taking it as an experiment. Daniyal gets sad about his brother's marriage as he wants to marry her to get American nationality. But, not only his this wish remain incomplete but his ex-beloved Husna, Fridous's daughter also starts to ignore him completely.

After marriage, Kim is attracted to Dawood who keeps trying to fulfill this relationship with his heart. But, she constantly keeps going to meet with his father's friend Zulfi, who later becomes her friend as well, knowing that the Grandfather doesn't like him. She learns that her father has taken all of her documents including the passport with him in the USA so that she couldn't return. In the USA, he has a cardiac arrest.

Kim deals with Dawood that she will not leave him if she is influenced by him. Dawood agrees with it and learns of her horrific past and how her teacher had abused her in her childhood. After days, she takes a stand for Suraiya when her elders decide to marry her with Firdous and Mudassir's son, Hamid without her consent. Kim learns of Suraiya's fellow Owais with whom she wants to marry, and fully supports her. She denies marrying Hamid and everyone in the house blames Kim for it. On a dark night before the day of her forced nikkah, Suraiya tries to elope from the house but Daniyal catches her.

Suraiya accuses Kim of advising her to elope, in front of everyone. Everyone blames Kim but Dawood supports her. He confirms it by unintentionally hearing Suraiya's discussion with Iqbal. She complains that marriage by choice is the basic right of every girl. After offering his Fajr prayer, Dawood is astonished to see Kim who starts offering her prayer. Suraiya realises her mistake and apologizes to her. Kim appreciates and morally supports her and makes it realize to Dawood that it is not justified at all to marry her without her consent. She and Dawood go to Owais' house where they realise that he is not a good match for her as his family members don't respect them at all. Suraiya also decides to not marry him. Dawood and Kim convince the grandfather to call off her nikkah with Hamid.

== Cast ==
- Bilal Ashraf as Dr. Dawood "David" Basharat: Basharat and Razia's son; Daniyal and Suraiya's brother; Kaneez's husband
- Maya Ali as Kaneez "Kim" Fatima: Naveed's daughter; Dawood's wife
- Manzoor Qureshi as Haji Karamat: Basharat, Iqbal, Firdous and Khursheed's father
- Behroze Sabzwari as Basharat Ali: Karamat's son; Iqbal, Firdous, Khursheed's brother; Dawood, Daniyal and Suraiya's father
- Tahira Imam as Razia Basharat: Basharat's wife; Dawood, Daniyal and Suraiya's mother
- Maha Hasan as Suraiya Basharat; Basharat and Razia's daughter; Dawood and Daniyal's sister
- Khaqan Shahnawaz as Daniyal "Dani" Basharat: Basharat and Razia's son; Dawood and Suraiya's brother
- Deepak Parwani as Dr. Naveed Ali : Kaneez's father
- Tazeen Hussain as Iqbal "Bali" Karamat: Karamat's daughter; Basharat, Firdous and Khursheed's sister
- Uzma Beg as Firdous Mudassir: Karamat's daughter; Mudassir's wife; Hamid's mother; Basharat, Iqbal, Khursheed's sister
- Saad Zameer Fareedi as Mudassir: Firdous's husband; Hamid's father
- Laiba Khurram as Husna
- Kulsoom Aftab as Azra
- Ali Rizvi as Sajjad
- Majida Hameed as Naseema
- Kausar Siddiqui as Uzma
- Shazia Qaiser as Uzma's mother

== Soundtrack ==
The original soundtrack was composed by Sami Khan, and sung by Sami Khan and Shae Gill.

"Yunhi"

Song by Shae Gill and Sami Khan
- Language: Urdu
- Released: 24 January 2023
- Length: 4:11
- Label: Hum
- Producer: MD Production
External videos
- Video on YouTube

== Production ==
On 28 August 2022, Hum TV announced that the network's upcoming series Yunhi will star Bilal Ashraf in his television series debut, opposite Maya Ali who will return to the channel after six years, since Sanam (2016). The principal photography wrapped on 10 June 2022.

== Reception ==
=== Television rating ===
Ep#	Date	TRP(s)	Rank#	Ref.
1	5 February 2023	8	1	
2	12 February 2023	6.6	1	
3	19 February 2023	6.0	1	
4	26 February 2023	4.2	1	
5	5 March 2023	5	1	
6	12 March 2023	5.5	1	
12	30 April 2023	5.9	1	
13	7 May 2023	6.6	1	
15	21 May 2023	8.6	1	
20	25 June 2023	7.2	1	
21	2 July 2023	7.2	1	
22	9 July 2023	7.6	1	

=== Critical reception ===
A reviewer from The News International stated that the series started off on a promising note but found the climax as "little too unbelievable". A reviewer from the Redbrick found that the series have a meaningful storyline with an impact and further stating that the series "really stuck with me".
