= Kamiar Rokni =

Pakistani fashion designer

- کامیار روکنی
- Born: 15 October 1976 (age 49)
- Education: Pakistan School of Fashion Design
- Label: 'The House of Kamiar Rokni'

Kamiar 'Kami' Rokni (Urdu: کامیار روکنی; born 15 October 1976) is a Pakistani fashion designer and media personality. He is the founder of his eponymous label, The House of Kamiar Rokni.

== Career ==
In late 2007, he launched his own fashion label, The House of Kamiar Rokni.

In 2008, Kamiar began hosting a show called No Reservations on Dawn News, where celebrities were invited for a candid talk about their lives.
