= Pakistan Institute of Fashion and Design =

Fashion school in Lahore, Pakistan

- انسٹی ٹیوٹ مد و طراحی پاکستان
- Former names: Pakistan School of Fashion and Design (1994–2008)
- Motto in English: Read in the name thy Lord who creates!
- Type: Public
- Established: 1994; 32 years ago
- Affiliations: HEC Pakistan; MoFed Pakistan; CUMULUS; Erasmus+ The Association of Commonwealth Universities
- Chancellor: Asif Ali Zardari
- Vice-Chancellor: Prof. Ms. Hina Tayyaba Khalil
- Location: Lahore, Punjab, Pakistan
- Campus: 3.25 hectares; Urban
- Website: pifd.edu.pk

Pakistan Institute of Fashion and Design, also referred to as PIFD, is a public design institution primarily located in Lahore, Punjab, Pakistan. It was established in 1994 as the Pakistan School of Fashion Design (PSFD) by the Trade Development Authority of Pakistan, a department within the Ministry of Commerce, becoming Pakistan’s first institution dedicated to fashion design education. The close collaboration among the textile industry, Erasmus+, Commonwealth Association, and business and arts communities is intended to foster multi-disciplinary education and research.

The Pakistan government, in May 2011, set out to grant the institute a degree-awarding charter enabling to provide degrees recognized by the Higher Education Commission of Pakistan.

The institute has 1000+ students, making it Pakistan's only design institute. PIFD is a member of the Cumulus Association, a global network of universities and colleges teaching art, design, and media.

== History ==
With the growth of Pakistani textiles industry, there was a shortage of trained professionals to develop the industry. In 1994 the Trade Development Authority of Pakistan (formerly EPB) with guidance from the government of Pakistan, established the Pakistan School of Fashion Design (PSFD) in rented premises on Sunder Das Road, Lahore. Mr. Ismail Qureshi, then Economic Minister at the Pakistan Embassy in Paris, played a key role in bringing fashion designer Mr. Olivier Lapidus on board as a co-founder. This collaboration led to the establishment of the PSFD as Pakistan's first dedicated institution for fashion education. The Pakistan School of Fashion and Design was named "Pakistan Institute of Fashion and Design" and incorporated under Section 42 of Companies Ordinance 1984, in 2008 under the sponsorship of Ministry of Commerce, the government of Pakistan. The No Objection Certificate was issued from the Higher Education Commission (Pakistan) (HEC) for degree-awarding status in 2007.

The institute was granted the 'charter for degree-awarding status' by the National Assembly in November 2010. This is a significant milestone in the endeavor to acquire Charter status which will enable the Institute to provide an HEC recognised degree.

== Schools ==
The institute comprises a four-year B. Des/BS. degree programme, divided into four schools:

- Faculty/School of Fashion Design
- Faculty/School of Fashion Marketing and Promotions
- Faculty/School of Textile Design
- Faculty/School of Accessories and Products
  - Department of Gems and Jewelry
  - Department of Furniture Design and Manufacturing
  - Department of Leather Accessories and Footwear
  - Department of Ceramics and Glassware

== Programme ==
The Foundation Year programme is a base for students before opting to pursue their major in any of the four schools (six disciplines). Students go abroad on exchange programmes and attend training and workshops in Paris; in Borås, Sweden; and at the Asian Institute of Gemological Sciences in Thailand.

The faculty portfolio consists of teachers, trained at L'Ecole Superieur Chamber Syndical de la Couture, Paris, and at affiliated schools.

Students from Punjab, Sindh, Khyber Pakhtunkhwa, Balochistan, Azad Jammu and Kashmir, FATA and Gilgit Baltistan, and from outside of Pakistan are enrolled at PIFD. Financial assistance is available: Rs. 3.8 million were given to 91 students in 2008–2009, and in 2009–2010, Rs. 8 million in financial aid was given to 161 students.

== Affiliations ==
The institute is affiliated with the Ecole de la Chambre Syndicale de la Couture Parisienne for Fashion Design, with the MOD'SPE Paris for Fashion Marketing and Promotions, with the Swedish College of Textile & Sciences in Borås, Sweden since 2007 for student exchange and curriculum development; and with the Asian Institute of Gemological Sciences, Thailand for the Gems and Jewelry programme.

Local partnerships include Ministry of Commerce, Ministry of Industries, Ministry of Textile, SMEDA, PIDC, AHAN, Pakistan Gems & Jewellery Development Company (PGJDC), Pakistan Fashion Design Council (PFDC), Fashion Pakistan, Footwear Association, Leather Accessories and Footwear Designers Community, Pakistan (LAFDCP), Pakistan Leather Garment Manufacturers and Exporters Association (PLGMEA), Pakistan Gloves Manufacturing Association, Ready Made Garment Association, USAID, GTZ, and Pakistan Council of Scientific and Industrial Research (PCSIR).

PIFD's collaboration with international universities and institutions:

- L'Ecole de la Chambre Syndicale de la Couture, Paris, France
- Mod'Spe Institute, Paris, France
- Milano Fashion Institute, Milan, Italy
- Moda Pelle Academy, Milan, Italy
- ARS SUTORIA, Milan, Italy
- Asian Institute of Gemological Sciences, Bangkok, Thailand
- University College of Boras, Sweden
- Aalto University, Finland
- Konstfack University, Sweden
- Fashion Institute of Technology, New York
- London College of Fashion, UK
- Embassy of Republic of Indonesia, Islamabad
- Institute of Industrial Design Co. Ltd., Poland

PIFD has been granted full membership of the Association of CUMULUS as decided by the General Assembly on 30 April 2016 in Nottingham, UK and became pioneer to have this membership in Pakistan.

PIFD's collaboration with national universities and institutions:

- University of Engineering and Technology, Peshawar
- Government of Punjab, PSDF Short Course Program
- Lahore Chamber of Commerce and Industry (LCCI)
- Pakistan Leather Competitiveness Improvement Program (PLCIP)
- The Punjab Educational Endowment Fund (PEEF)
- Fashion Central Media Group
- Hum TV Network
- Pakistan Fashion Design Council (PFDC)

== Alumni ==
PIFD graduates are the highest paid graduates in the country and have a 100% employment ratio. They teach at Dubai, Shanghai, and Cairo fashion schools and are working in the industry as creative directors, designers, pattern makers, merchandisers, and managers. PIFD alumni serve as faculty in seven fashion schools of Pakistan.

== Notable alumni ==
Among its notable alumni are the designers Hassan Sheheryar Yasin, Maria B, Kamiar Rokni, Nomi Ansari, Ali Munawar, Saira Shakira, Ali Xeeshan, Mohsin Ali, Akif Mahmood, Sara Rohale Asghar and Humza Bokhari.

== Network ==
An initiative has been taken to establish six affiliated colleges, in six cities of the country, in 2011. This project is being rolled out with collaboration from the Trade Development Authority of Pakistan.

- Islamabad College offers Fashion Design, and Gems and Jewellery studies
- Faisalabad College offers Fashion Design and Textile Design
- Peshawar College offers Gems and Jewellery, and Furniture
- Multan College offers Textile Design and Ceramics
- Quetta College offers Gems and Jewellery, and Furniture Design
- Hala College offers Ceramics
