= Rup Magon =

- Born: Montreal, Quebec, Canada
- Occupations: Singer-songwriter, record producer, composer, musician, actor, author
- Instruments: Tabla, harmonium, piano, dholak
- Years active: 1996-present
- Website: planetjosh.com

Rupinder "Rup" Singh Magon is an Indian-Canadian singer, songwriter, producer, actor and author born and raised in Montreal, Quebec. He is a co-lead singer of JoSH, a South Asian fusion band.

== Music career ==
Rup founded Josh in 1996 with his brother, Rik Magon, and good friend Shiraz 'Shazi' Hussain. They were joined by Qurram 'q' Hussein, Rup's current band-mate, in 1998, and two years later Rup and Q embarked on their own path for JoSH without Rik and Shiraz.

Rup's love and drive for music and the arts, and his unquestioned belief that he could make a career for himself singing South Asian Fusion music, despite being based in Canada, was initially met with doubt and skepticism from friends and family, who wanted him to pursue a more traditional 'North American' career not based in the arts. Rup never relented, working tirelessly with Q to produce their first compositions for Josh, "Main Hoon Tanha", which also ended up being the title track for their debut album.

Rup and Q have continued to produce successful music and albums, including Kabhi (2004), Josh's much-anticipated second album, Mausam (2006), JoSH's third album, and Beyond Kismat, JoSH's most-recent fourth album released in 2010. JoSH has worked on various other projects as well, including a remix of Grammy winner Nelly Furtado's latest singles, "Promiscuous Girl" and "Maneater".

Among Rup's accomplishments as a member of JoSH include becoming the first Canadian Sikh to win both MTV India and MTV Pakistan awards.

Rup has also ventured outside of the realm of music to expand his career within the umbrella of the Performing Arts.

== Solo Career ==
In October 2026, Magon announced Disrupt, his debut solo EP, developed over more than five years. He describes its style as "Sufi funk", a fusion of funk rhythms with Eastern melodies. The EP was introduced by the singles "Flight Mode" and "Without You".

== Acting ==
Rup is in the 2011 sports comedy film Speedy Singhs (also known as Breakaway), directed by Robert Lieberman, starring Vinay Virmani, Russell Peters, Camilla Belle, and Anupam Kher. Rup plays the role of Jassi Singh, a member of the Speedy Singhs hockey team featured in the film. Akshay Kumar, Drake, and Ludacris also make cameo appearances in the film.

JoSH recorded the title track for the Speedy Singhs/Breakaway film, titled "Chaddi Wale Yaar".

In 2015, Magon appeared in Deepa Mehta's crime film Beeba Boys. The same year, he played the lead role in the short film Bonjour Ji, about prejudice and communication between Montreal's cultural communities. The film won Best Short at the International Film Festival of South Asia, and Best North American Short at the Vancouver International South Asian Film Festival and the DC South Asian Film Festival.

In the 2017 historical drama The Black Prince, directed by Kavi Raz, Magon played Arur Singh, the personal attendant and confidant of Maharaja Duleep Singh.

In 2020, he appeared as Amandeep in the comedy web series Decoys.

== Author ==
Rup's cookbook Ten Easy Desi Recipes for Guys featuring Indian cuisine, is planned for release in 2027.
