= Josh (band) =

Canadian Bhangra music group

- Also known as: Jösh, JoSH
- Origin: Montreal, Quebec, Canada
- Genre: Bhangra
- Years active: 2000–present
- Label: Universal
- Members: q (Qurram Hussain); Rup (Rup Magon)
- Past members: Rik Magon; Shazi Hussain
- Website: planetjosh.com

Josh, sometimes stylized as JoSH or as Jösh, is a Canadian Bhangra music group formed in 2000 in Montreal, Quebec. Present members are "Rup" (Rup Magon) and "Q" (Qurram Hussain). Their songs showcase both modern and bhangra beats and music, but are strongly influenced by hip hop and pop music.

== Career ==
Josh was founded in 1996 by Rup Magon with his brother, Rik Magon, and friend Shiraz 'Shazi' Hussain. They were joined by Qurram 'q' Hussein, Rup's in 1998, and two years later Rup and Q embarked on their own path for JoSH as a duo without Rik and Shiraz.

While JoSH may be less known in their home country of Canada, they are very popular in South Asia, particularly in India and Pakistan. Their second album, Kabhi, as well as its title track, remained in both Indian and MTV World Top 20 lists for 26 weeks from October 2004 to January 2005. Additionally, JoSH was awarded MTV India's 2004 "Immie" award for Best New Non-Film Artist.

JoSH has collaborated with Grammy winner Nelly Furtado with bhangra remixes of her singles "Powerless (Say What You Want)", "Promiscuous", and "Maneater". They were also featured in Nelly Furtado's tour in India.

JoSH has also been involved with numerous multi-cultural initiatives, such as appearing on stage at Toronto's Yonge-Dundas Square (now Sankofa Square) as headliners of the 2007 South Asian Canadian Music Festival 'desiFest', founded by youth entrepreneur Sathish Bala. At the event, JoSH was introduced by special guest Sitara Hewitt, star of the hit Canadian television comedy sitcom Little Mosque on the Prairie.

In 2009, JoSH performed in Coke Studio along with Pakistani leading artist Shafqat Amanat Ali. In 2017, Josh made an appearance in the Grand Final episode of the revamped Pepsi Battle of the Bands played in Karachi.

== Discography ==
- 2001 - Main Hoon Tanha
- 2004 - Kabhi
- 2006 - Mausam
- 2010 - Beyond Kismat

== See also ==
- Qurram Hussain
- Rup Magon
