= Hassan Sheheryar Yasin =

Pakistani fashion designer and television host

Hasan Sheheryar Yasin
- حسن شهریار یاسین
- Born: 26 October 1978 (age 48); Islamabad, Pakistan, Pakistan
- Education: Pakistan School of Fashion Design
- Label: HSY
- Parent: Mian Hamid Yasin (father)
- Awards: Lux Style Fashion Designer of the Year (2005)
- Website: theworldofhsy.com

Hassan Sheheryar Yasin, often referred to by his initials, HSY, (born 26 October 1978) is a Pakistani fashion designer, television host and actor.

Hassan was born to an Arain family who were active in politics. His father, Mian Hamid Yasin, was a chief whip in Zulfikar Ali Bhutto government. His parents separated when he was in his early age. After their separation, he moved with his mother to the United States. He received his early schooling in New York, USA. He was salutatorian of the Pakistan School of Fashion Design (class of 2000). Yasin is affiliated with the La Chambre Syndicale De La Couture Parisienne in France. He holds an honours degree in couture and serves on the board of directors and the executive committee of the fashion institute he graduated from. Hassan Shehryar hosts a prime-time talk show Tonite with HSY on Hum Sitaray.

Starting as a fashion choreographer in 1994, Yasin worked both as a choreographer and designer to various shows within Pakistan and international shows including Dubai, London, New York City and Toronto.

== HSY ==
2000 marked the introduction of Yasin's own fashion label, HSY. Starting as a bridal and formal wear couture house, it became one of Pakistan's most recognized fashion labels and employs over 350 people and six stores internationally (including Dubai), with the flagship housed in Lahore. In 2003, Karachi-based Diva Magazine placed Yasin on the cover of their "Most Powerful People" issue and as one of their 10 "Faces of the Year".

In 2007, Yasin introduced a jewellery line under the HSY brand.

In October 2026, Pakistan International Airlines announced that designs by HSY had been selected for its new cabin crew uniforms, which will officially enter service on October 31. The airline described the uniforms as “engineered for long-haul durability and ergonomic movement,” featuring “soft, breathable fabrics [and] structured tailoring.”

== Awards and nominations ==
=== National and Industry Awards ===
Year	Award / Recognition	Category / Details	Result
2005	Lux Style Award	Fashion Designer of the Year	Winner
2009	Lux Style Award	Best Achievement in Fashion Design	Winner
2010	Lux Style Award	Best Dressed Male	Special Award
2013	Hum Awards	Best Designer Womenswear	Winner
2016	Lux Style Award	Best Designer Menswear	Nominated
2017	Lux Style Award	Best Designer Menswear	Nominated
2018	Lux Style Award	Best Menswear Designer	Nominated
2020	Pakistan International Screen Awards (PISA)	Best Designer	Winner
2021	ARY People's Choice Awards	Best Designer of the Year	Winner
2022	Critics Choice Awards	Best Designer – Bridal	Winner

=== Committee Appointments and Other Recognitions ===
Member of Oscars 2020 Selection Committee: HSY was appointed to the committee selecting Pakistan's official submission for Best International Feature Film at the Oscars 2020.

Goodwill Ambassador for NOWPDP (2021): Appointed as a Goodwill Ambassador for the National Organisation for Welfare of the Physically Disabled Pakistan (NOWPDP) in 2021.

== Filmography ==
=== Television ===
Year	Title	Role	Notes
2021	Pehli Si Muhabbat	Akram	Television debut
2024	Ijazat	TBA	Telefilm

=== Films ===
Year	Title	Role
2022	Ishrat Made in China	Master Mangshi
