= Rangreza =

2017 film

- Urdu: رنگریزا
- Written by: Akhtar Qayyum
- Produced by: Akhtar Qayyum; Yasir Mohiuddin; Usman Malkani
- Starring: Gohar Rasheed; Bilal Ashraf; Urwa Hocane; Ghana Ali
- Cinematography: Sadiq Azeem & Usman Malkani
- Edited by: Mohammad Arif Adnan Ali Khan
- Music by: J Ali (Score)
- Production companies: Vision Art Films; MH Films; Malkani Films
- Distributed by: ARY Films; B4U Motion Pictures
- Release dates: 21 December 2017 (Pakistan); 22 December 2017 (Worldwide)
- Country: Pakistan
- Language: Urdu
- Box office: Rs. 3.50 crore (US$130,000)

Rangreza is a 2017 Pakistani musical romantic drama film directed by Amir Mohiuddin, and written by Akhtar Qayyum under the production banner of Vision Art Films. The film features Gohar Rasheed, Bilal Ashraf, Urwa Hocane and Ghana Ali in the main cast. It is also produced by Yasir Mohiuddin and Usman Malkani under the MH Films and Malkani Films respectively.

The film released on 22 December 2017, and was distributed by ARY Films in Pakistan and by B4U Motion Pictures worldwide. It is said to be one of the most expensive Pakistani films of the year.

== Plot ==
The story revolves around Reshmi, who belongs to a traditional Qawwal family and has been engaged since childhood to her cousin, Waseem. Conflict arises when Ali, a famous popstar falls in love with Reshmi. The film is a journey of how two different classes and schools of thought come together.

== Cast ==
- Bilal Ashraf as Ali Zain
- Urwa Hocane as Reshmi
- Gohar Rasheed as Waseem Wallay
- Ghana Ali as Saba
- Saleem Mairaj as Waseem's friend
- Akbar Subhani
- Humaira Bano
- Seemi Pasha
- Alyzeh Gabol (cameo appearance)
- Villayat Hussain - Uncredited (Screen Only)
- Saba Faisal as Aapa

== Production ==
=== Casting ===
Sana Javed was signed for the film to play the lead female role but due to some reasons she opted herself out of the film and the producers signed Urwa Hocane. In an interview, Hocane told that she will play the role of a kind girl named Reshmi. Bilal Ashraf will essay the role of a Rockstar, whilst in an interview with The Express Tribune Ashraf stated, "I have put my heart and soul into the film. Even though it was really difficult playing a musician, I was convinced I could do it. I hope the audience like my attempt."

Ghana Ali said in an interview with HIP that she will play the role of Saba. Alyzeh Gabol will make her debut in film by a cameo appearance.

=== Filming ===
The shooting of the film began in Karachi.

== Release ==
The film had a limited release in Pakistan on 21 December 2017, a day before its worldwide release on 22 December. World television premier of the movie was held by TV One on Eid ul Adha 2018.

=== Box office ===
Rangreza opened to Rs. 9 lakh in its limited release on Thursday in Pakistan. It opened to Rs. 40 lakh in overseas markets on Friday. It ended its first Saturday and Sunday with collecting about Rs. 38 lakh internationally and Rs. 60 lakh nationwide; to make the total collection of about Rs. 2.5 crore worldwide on 25 December; completing the extended weekend.

=== Critical reception ===
The film was premiered on 19 December 2017 in Karachi. For The Express Tribune, Rahul Aijaz praised the music, however, rated the film 1.5 stars out of 5, saying "a sad case which delivers on a few fronts but fails by a large margin on major ones, therefore diluting its experience". Shafiq Ul Hasan rated only 1 star out of 5 and wrote, "Rangreza is a tasteless, colourless and soulless failure […] the film simply cannot be categorised under any genre." Sonia Ashraf of DAWN Images too praised the music and some actors, and commented, "while the film was simple," it has "its moments and drawbacks" that "could have been improved with a tighter script and attention to detail". Shahjehan Saleem of Something Haute criticized its 3-hour-long length, and rated 2.5 stars out of 5, saying "an inept effort due to the weak script and direction," which "proves to be a wasted opportunity for the cast", however, he praised the cast and noted that "The stylization of the film is very strong".

Shyama Sudra of BizAsia rated 4.5 out of 5 stars, and praised it saying "a wonderful film that represents brilliant film-making at its core." Manal Faheem Khan of The News International praised the cast and music, and said, "Rangreza had a lot of potential and could have been saved with better editing, but the film is jumpy and awkward sometimes." Faizan Javed of The Nation praised the film and said, "a blockbuster with spices for all age groups, social backgrounds and genders", the movie "offered a number of social messages for the masses". Abdullah Ejaz of Dunya News rated 3.5 out of 5 stars and commented that Mohiuddin and Qayyum "deserve a pat on the back for the cast they took", adding "Qayyum being a composer was bound by Mother Nature to channel some music-related plot in his writing" and "there's nothing wrong here." Ally Adnan of Daily Times rated 0 out of 5 stars, he wrote in a negative review that "Rangreza has three big problems:" Hocane, "who cannot act;" Rasheed, "who acts a little too much;" and Ashraf, "who does not make any effort to act."

=== Accolades ===
Ceremony	Nominated
17th Lux Style Awards	Gohar Rasheed – Best Supporting Actor; Jonita Gandhi – Best Female Singer for "Bagiya Mein Mor"
4th Galaxy Lollywood Awards	Gohar Rasheed – Best Actor in a Supporting Role Male; Abida Parveen – Best Playback Singer Female for "Phool Khil Jaein"; Akhtar Qayyum – Best Music; "Phool Khil Jaein" – Song of the Year; Alyzeh Gabol – Best Special Appearance

== Soundtrack ==
Rangreza

Soundtrack album by various artists
- Released: 13 December 2017
- Recorded: 2016–17
- Genres: Soundtrack, Qawwali
- Length: 23:15
- Label: B4U Motion Pictures
- Producers: J Ali, Qurram Hussain, Hamza Akram Qawwal

Score of the film is composed by its writer Akhtar Qayyum. The film soundtrack was released by B4U Motion Pictures on 13 December 2017 via iTunes, but qawwali "Janasheen" was not included in it.

No.	Title	Lyrics	Music	Singer(s)	Length
1.	"Phool Khil Jaayein"			Abida Parveen, Asrar	5:12
2.	"Rangreza"	Azam Pasha	J Ali	J Ali	4:13
3.	"Bulleya"		J Ali	Asrar	4:12
4.	"Bagiya Mein Mor"	Tauqeer Bhinder	Qurram Hussain, Tauqeer Bhinder	Jonita Gandhi	4:02
5.	"Balamwa"		Hamza Akram Qawwal	Fareed Ayaz, Abu Mohammad, Hamza Akram Qawwal	5:36
6.	"Janasheen"	Qurram Hussain, Akhtar Qayyum	Qurram Hussain	Qurram Hussain	5:42
Total length:					28:57

== See also ==
- List of Pakistani films of 2017
