= Bilal Ashraf =

Pakistani actor, producer, and director (born 1979)

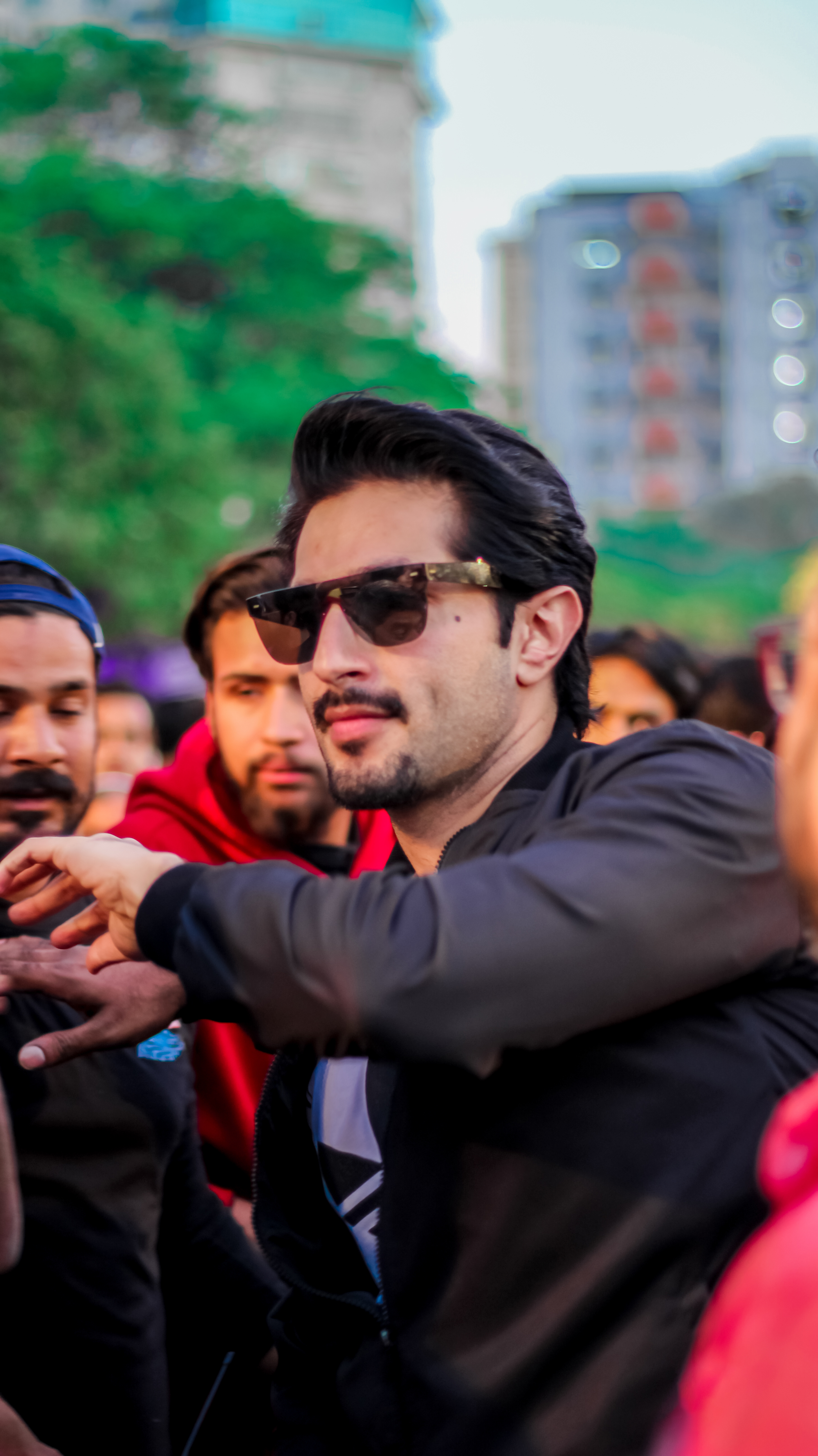
- Ashraf promoting Janaan in 2016
- Born: 10 October 1979 (age 46); Karachi, Sindh, Pakistan
- Education: Franklin & Marshall College
- Occupations: Actor; Visual director; Producer
- Years active: 2014 – present
- Relatives: Sadia Ashraf (sister)

Bilal Ashraf (Urdu: بلال اشرف; born 10 October 1979) is a Pakistani actor, producer, and visual effects director. After studying visual effects at Franklin Marshall College, he started his career as a visual effects director and then pursued his career in acting after making a brief appearance in the 2014 thriller O21. Ashraf has since starred in the romantic comedy Janaan (2016), the acclaimed war drama Yalghaar (2017), and the musical romance Superstar (2019).

== Early life and education ==
Bilal Ashraf was born in Karachi into an Urdu speaking family of Punjabi origins. Playing a Pashtun character in Janaan (2016) but himself not being one, he learnt some Pashto for his role, enough to "look comfortable lip-syncing to songs."

Ashraf received his early education from St. Michael's Convent School in Karachi. He studied visual effects direction at Franklin & Marshall College in Pennsylvania, United States. He did a double major in finance and arts. Later, he went to Escape Studios in London to learn animation. He has ten years of experience behind the camera.

== Career ==
Ashraf initially worked as a hedge consultant in New York, but he later quit his job and moved to London in order to study animation and visual effects at the insistence of his late sister, Sadia Ashraf, a director as well as a teacher of filmmaking at the New York University, who wanted to improve Pakistan's cinema and with whom he created Radical Films. She is the reason he decided to become an actor. Ashraf has named Pink Floyd as his all-time favourite band, and has chosen Scent of a Woman as the movie that pushed him to become an actor, while he also described sculpting and painting as his "hidden talents."

Ashraf made a cameo appearance in the 2014 thriller film O21. In 2016, Ashraf made his lead acting debut in Janaan, a romantic comedy, alongside Armeena Khan and Ali Rehman Khan, which was appreciated by critics as well as by the audiences. The next year he appeared in the war film Yalghaar, which had a decent opening at the box office, while his other 2017 release, Rangreza, was both a critical and commercial failure.

In 2019, he played the leading role in Ehteshamuddin's directorial debut, Superstar, produced by Momina Duraid and with Mahira Khan as co-star. Superstar became the highest-grossing film for Bilal Ashraf. Explaining his long absence since Rangreza, he said that, considering its missed potential, he'll look more seriously at the scripts, and also shared the fact that he took acting classes in the United Kingdom as well as theater classes with actor Sunil Shankar in the NAPA, in Karachi.

In 2021, he launched his acting career on television with Aik Hai Nigar and also became a producer, founding the production house Behive Transmedia with director-actor Ehteshamuddin, their first release being the historical drama Khaab Toot Jaatay Hain.

In 2026, he reunited with Ehteshamuddin for the action film Khan Tumhara, which was initially scheduled for an Eid al-Adha release. He performed his own stunts during filming, sustaining injuries. The film was delayed, and no new release date has been announced.

== In the media ==
In 2019, he was featured in the magazine Eastern Eye's listing in the United Kingdom and was ranked No. 7th on "Sexiest Asian Men", which included Ali Zafar, Hrithik Roshan, Zayn Malik, and Ali Rehman Khan.

== Filmography ==
=== Film ===
Year	Title	Role	Director(s)	Notes
2014	O21	Ahmad	Jami; Summer Nicks	Cameo appearance
2016	Janaan	Asfandyar	Azfar Jafri	Debut film as a lead
2017	Yalghaar	Captain Bilal	Hassan Rana	
2017	Rangreza	Ali Zain	Amir Mohiuddin	
2019	Superstar	Sameer	Mohammed Ehteshamuddin	
2026	Khan Tumhara	Yusuf Khan	Mohammed Ehteshamuddin	

=== Television series ===
Year	Title	Role	Producer	Network	Notes
2021	Khaab Toot Jaatay Hain	No	Yes	Hum TV	Debut as producer
2023	Yunhi	Dr. Dawood Basharat		Hum TV	Debut as television actor

=== Web series ===
Year	Title	Role	Network	Ref(s)
2026	Jo Bachay Hain Sang Samait Lo	Waqar Khan	Netflix	

=== Telefilm ===
Year	Title	Role	Network	Notes
2021	Aik Hai Nigar	Johar Ali Khan	ARY Digital	Debut television

=== Other appearance ===
Year	Title	Role	Network	Notes
2017	Mazaaq Raat	Himself	Dunya News	Guest
2017	Tonite with HSY	Himself	Hum TV	Guest
2020	Jeeto Pakistan League Season 1	Himself	ARY Digital	Guest

== Awards and nominations ==
Year	Award	Category	Work	Result	Ref.
2017	1st International Pakistan Prestige Awards	Best Actor Debut	Janaan	Nominated	
2017	3rd Pakistani Music and Media Awards	Best Actor	Janaan	Won	
2017	International Pakistan Prestige Awards	IPPA Style Icon of the Year	—N/a	Nominated	
2020	1st Pakistan International Screen Awards	Favourite Actor Film	Superstar	Nominated	
2021	5th Kashmir Hum Style Awards	Most Stylish Actor in Film	—N/a	Won	
2022	Pakistan Digital Awards	Host for Jubiliee	—N/a	Won	
2022	Pakistan Digital Awards	Best Actor	—N/a	Won	
