= Syed Sajjad Hussain =

Pakistani-Bangladeshi academic (1920–1995)

- সৈয়দ সাজ্জাদ হোসেন (Bengali) سید سجاد حسین (Urdu)

4th Vice Chancellor of University of Rajshahi
- In office 5 August 1969 – 18 July 1971
- Preceded by: Muhammad Shamsul Huq
- Succeeded by: Muhammad Abdul Bari

13th Vice Chancellor of University of Dhaka
- In office 18 July 1971 – January 1972
- Preceded by: Abu Sayeed Chowdhury
- Succeeded by: Muzaffar Ahmed Chowdhury

Personal details
- Born: 14 January 1920 Alokdia, Magura, Bengal Presidency
- Died: 12 January 1995 (aged 74) Dhaka, Bangladesh
- Relatives: Syed Ali Ahsan (cousin); Syed Ali Ashraf (cousin)
- Education: University of Dhaka; University of Nottingham
- Occupation: Academic

Syed Sajjad Hussain (14 January 1920 – 12 January 1995) was a Bangladeshi academic and writer. He served as the 4th Vice-chancellor of the University of Rajshahi.

== Early life ==
Hussain was born on 14 January 1920, to a Bengali Muslim family of Syeds in the village of Alokdia in Magura (formerly under Jessore District), Bengal Province to Syed Ahmad Hussain and Khurshida Talat Banu, who died when Hussain was five. When he was four, his parents moved to the Dhaka District.

== Education ==
Hussain received his secondary education at Dhaka High Madrassah. He earned his master's in English from the University of Dhaka in 1942, earning a BA the year before in the same subject. During his masters studies, the East Pakistan Literary Society was founded by Hussain with him as chairman which aimed to disseminate the message of Pakistan and forge a distinct Bengali Muslim literary idiom and held a successful conference in 1943 and presided over a EPLS conference in 1944 in Calcutta; Hussain also contributed to a Bengali fortnightly called Pakistan as well as to other newspapers like Azad, which he was invited to contribute by the invitation of Abul Kalam Shamsuddin. He obtained his Ph.D. from the University of Nottingham in 1952, where he wrote a thesis on Kipling and India, later published as a book.

== Career ==
Hussain debuted his teaching career at Calcutta Islamic College in 1944. In September 1947, Hussain was transferred to Sylhet's M.C. College where he spent a year teaching. He was a professor at Department of English of the University of Dhaka during 1948–1969. He was then appointed the Vice-Chancellor of the University of Rajshahi in 1969, a post he held until being appointed Vice-Chancellor of Dhaka University in July 1971.

Hussain worked as a professor of English at Umm al-Qura University in Makkah, Saudi Arabia during 1975–1985. He moved back to Bangladesh in the late 1980s, where in retirement wrote for English and Bengali newspapers in Dhaka, reviewed books for the Muslim World Book Review published from Leicester, and published many of his books (including in collaboration with Dr Matiur Rahman), and lived in Dhaka until his death in January 1995, while he was writing a biography of the Islamic prophet Muhammad.

Hussain travelled across the world during his career. In 1954 he visited Burma as part of a student delegation. In 1954, he attended a PEN conference in Holland and a year later organised a PEN conference in Dhaka. In 1956, he visited the USA on a leadership grant. In 1962, he visited India as a member of the Pakistan Delegation to the Commonwealth Educational Conference. He was a member of a Pakistani delegation to the October Day Celebrations in China. In 1970, he visited Japan to attend a conference on Religion. He visited Iran twice, firstly in 1970 as leader of the RCD team and in 1971 to attend the 2500 anniversary of monarchy Iran celebrations. He visited Poland in 1971 as a delegate to the Professors of English conference in Pozniak. In 1977, Hussain participated in the conference on education in Makkah, Saudi Arabia.

Hussain was one of the founding members of the Asiatic Society of Pakistan, in which he served a term as its secretary.

== Controversy ==
Hussain took stance against the separation of East Pakistan as an independent country during the Bangladesh Liberation War. In March 1971, the then Vice-chancellor of the University of Dhaka, Justice Abu Sayed Chowdhury resigned from the post protesting the killing of two students by Pakistani Army. Pakistani Government immediately put Hussain in the vacant position. After the surrender of Dhaka in December 1971, Hussain was seized by guerillas and tortured. He however managed to survive albeit he was paralysed and admitted to Dhaka Medical College Hospital by the order of the Indian army. He was imprisoned after the independence of Bangladesh, but released on 5 December 1973. While in prison, he wrote his memoir which was later published in 1995 titled "The Wastes of Time: Reflections on the Decline and Fall of East Pakistan", which provides a detailed account and genesis of the decline and fall of East Pakistan. On his release, he moved to England, where he was briefly a fellow at Cambridge University.

== Views ==
Hussain was thus an active supporter of the Pakistan Movement in his youth and embodied the idealism of the youth during the 1940s. Indeed, when Muhammad Ali Jinnah visited Dhaka in the winter of 1936 on his mission to reorganise the Muslim League, Hussain had his first opportunity of hearing Jinnah and was immediately won over to the cause of Muslim nationalism. He was one of the first to welcome the Pakistan scheme in a letter to the Statesman of Calcutta in June 1941. Hussain remained dedicated to the idea and ideology of Pakistan throughout his life.

== In popular culture ==
In 2021 Pakistan’s Hum TV released an historical drama based on Hussain’s book Wastes of Times, a miniseries called Khaab Toot Jaatay Hain.

== Bibliography ==
=== English ===
- Hussain, Syed Sajjad (1960). Descriptive Catalogue of Bengal Muslims.
- Hussain, Syed Sajjad (1962). East Pakistan: a Profile.
- Hussain, Syed Sajjad (1963). Nixed Grill: A Collection of Essays on Religion and Culture.
- Hussain, Syed Sajjad (1965). Kipling and India: An Inquiry into the Nature and Extent of Kipling's Knowledge of the Indian Sub-Continent.
- Hussain, Syed Sajjad (1965). Homage to Shakespeare.
- Hussain, Syed Sajjad (1969). Drama in a Developing Society.
- Hussain, Syed Sajjad (1969). Books on the Quaid-e-Azam.
- Hussain, Syed Sajjad; et al. (Abdel-Hamid El-Khoreiby) (1983). A Guide to Literary Criticism.
- Hussain, Syed Sajjad (1984). An Annotated Anthology of English Poetry for Arab Students.
- Hussain, Syed Sajjad (1992). A Young Muslim's Guide to Religions in the World.
- Hussain, Syed Sajjad (1994). Civilisation and Society.
- Hussain, Syed Sajjad (1996). The Wastes of Time: Reflections on the Decline and Fall of East Pakistan.

=== Bengali ===
- Hussain, Syed Sajjad (1960). মা (in Bengali).
- Hussain, Syed Sajjad (1970). নির্ঘণ্ট-অভিধান (in Bengali).
- Hussain, Syed Sajjad (1993). একাত্তরের স্মৃতি (in Bengali). ISBN 9789848126295.
- Hussain, Syed Sajjad. আরবী সাহিত্যে ইতিবৃত্ত (in Bengali).
