= Stirgay Sre Na Manum =

Stirgay Sre Na Manum (English; Red Eyes Not Acceptable) is a 2017 Pakistani Pashto-language Action film directed by Arshad Khan and Shahid Khan and Mehak Noor in the lead role. It was released on 14 April 2017.
