= Tonite with HSY =

- Written by: Ahsan Raza Firdousi
- Directed by: Muhammad Jamal Khan
- Presented by: Hassan Sheheryar Yasin
- Starring: Hassan Sheheryar Yasin
- Original languages: Urdu; English
- No. of seasons: 5
- No. of episodes: 62

Production
- Executive producers: Sultana Siddiqui; Khalid Soorty
- Producer: Muhammad Talal Hashmi
- Production locations: Hum TV Studio in I.I Chundrigar Road, Karachi.
- Running time: 40 minutes

Original release
- Network: Hum Sitaray Hum TV Hum Europe
- Release: 13 September 2014 – present

Tonite with HSY (Urdu: آج رات حسن شہریار یاسین کے ساتھ) is a Pakistani prime time talk show hosted by Hassan Sheheryar Yasin (HSY) on Hum Sitaray. The show premiered on 13 September 2014. It is presented by Djuice and produced by Hum Television Network. Tonite with HSY represents the debut of prominent fashion designer HSY as a television host. Prior to the show, HSY had only made brief television appearances other than as a designer on fashion shows. The show's associate producers are Nida Lakhani and Sara Bhatti, of Hum TV, and its executive producers are Hum TV CEO Sultana Siddiqui and Hum Sitaray vice president Khalid Soorty. Tonite with HSY is recorded at Hum TV Studio in I.I Chundrigar Road, Karachi.

Tonite with HSY opens with a monologue by HSY. It then transitions into guest introductions, concluding with guest interviews and fun interactive segments. The debut episode attracted positive reviews from television critics and was viewed by millions of people in Pakistan.

From Season 1-3, Hum Sitaray aired one episode a week, on Saturdays at 9:10 p.m Pakistan Standard Time (PST). Season 4 aired on Hum TV every Sunday at 10.20pm PST. Season 5 premiered on Hum TV on 15 July 2018, and was broadcast at 9.10pm every Sunday. The finale was scheduled to air on 7 October 2018, concluding the 13 episodes of Season 5. Tonite with HSY is aired in Europe at 9:00 pm on Hum Europe.

== Background ==
Talk shows in Pakistan focus mainly on news and current affairs. There are few late-night, prime time or daytime entertainment talk shows similar to those produced elsewhere in the world.

Tonite with HSY marks the television debut of its host, Hassan Sheheryar Yasin (HSY). HSY is one of Pakistan's most prominent fashion designers, with 20 years in the fashion industry. When the show premiered on 13 September 2014, HSY said in an interview: "I have been offered shows many times before but I never had the time...I love TV and everyone knows that I love talking, so it seemed like a great time to start this up."

According to HSY, the show was conceived as an escape from the daily hustle and bustle of life, offering a completely different platform for conversation between the host and guests. In an interview HSY said:

"There is a lot of despair in our country and TV in Pakistan is a constant reminder of all the wrong things happening in our part of the world. This new show is one way to get people to focus on the positive and take a break from all the negativity in our lives. The new show is based on an entirely new format; it’s literally like walking into my house and having a chat with me. The set is very creatively designed and looks just like my house; hence, it is an ideal place to have intimate conversations with yours truly."

The show, intended as popular entertainment, was designed to air once a week, with a running time of around one hour or 40 minutes.

== Format ==
Episodes of Tonite with HSY usually open with a brief introduction of the invited guests, followed by an initial conversation between the host and guests. After around fifteen minutes, the main part of the episode begins. Episodes are divided into three segments:

- "Love 'em Hate 'em": the first segment, in which guests are shown a series of pictures of celebrities, and have five seconds to say for each whether they love or hate that person
- "Ajnabi Kaun Ho Tum": the second segment, in which each guest receives an anonymous phone call from family, friends, or colleagues and must guess the caller's name
- "Tarka": the third and final round, a Question and Answer session in which guests are given questions written on a card, and must take turns firing questions at each other

== Episodes ==
=== Debut episode ===
The debut episode of Tonite with HSY premiered on 13 September 2014. It featured two of Pakistan's best-known faces, Mahira Khan and Fawad Khan.

In the episode, without introducing himself, HSY conducts a spontaneous interview with the guests before launching into the show's standard three-segment format. Mahira and Fawad are asked about their life, success, and achievements after their groundbreaking serial Humsafar. HSY then launches the show's three segments, running each with Mahira first and then Fawad. Mahira wins the game, taking the prize of a PKR 50,000 voucher/gift-hamper from the Contradictions furniture store.

== See also ==
- TUC The Lighter Side of Life
