= FM91 =

Pakistani radio station

- Pakistan

Ownership
- Owner: Air Waves Media (Pvt) Ltd
- Sister stations: TV One, News One (Pakistani TV channel), Waseb TV

History
- First air date: 2005
- Former names: Radio1 FM 91

Links
- Website: fm91.com.pk

FM91 is a radio station in Pakistan, covering Karachi, Lahore, Islamabad and Gwadar with its transmissions. It is owned by Air Waves Media (Pvt) Ltd, the media wing of the Interflow Group. The station is headquartered in Karachi with production facilities in Lahore, Islamabad and Multan.

Sara Taher Khan is the CEO.

== Radio shows ==
- Infinite Imaginations
