= Diva Magazine (Pakistan) =

Diva Magazine Pakistan
- Editor In Chief: Raheel Rao
- Categories: Fashion, Beauty and Entertainment
- Frequency: Monthly
- First issue: 1999
- Company: Diva Online
- Country: Pakistan
- Based in: Karachi
- Language: English
- Website: https://www.divaonline.com.pk/

Diva Magazine (Urdu: دیوا میگزین) is a fashion, entertainment, travel, lifestyle and beauty magazine of Pakistan, a monthly publication that is published from Karachi and is distributed across Pakistan.

== History ==
Diva Magazine Pakistan was founded by Raheel Rao in 1999 but the magazine started publishing in 2002. Diva Magazine is only Pakistan's fashion and entertainment magazine that launched new faces. Diva Magazine Pakistan has been known for its magazine covers that cover divas. Its headquarters are located in DHA, Karachi, Pakistan.

== Main categories ==
Diva Magazine main categories are E-Diva, Fashion, Entertainment, Beauty, Lifestyle, Travel, Food, and Interviews.
