= Sta Muhabbat Me Zindagi Da =

- Directed by: A.K. Khan
- Written by: Sajjad Ali
- Produced by: Muzaffar Khan; Shahjehan Khan; Arshad Khattak
- Edited by: Asad Zada
- Release date: 26 June 2017 (Pakistan)
- Country: Pakistan
- Language: Pushto

Sta Muhabbat Me Zindagi Da (English; Your love is my life) is a Pashto 2017's romantic film made by A.K Khan. It was released on 26 June 2017 on Eid al-Fitr.
