= Darul Ihsan University =

University in Dhaka, Bangladesh

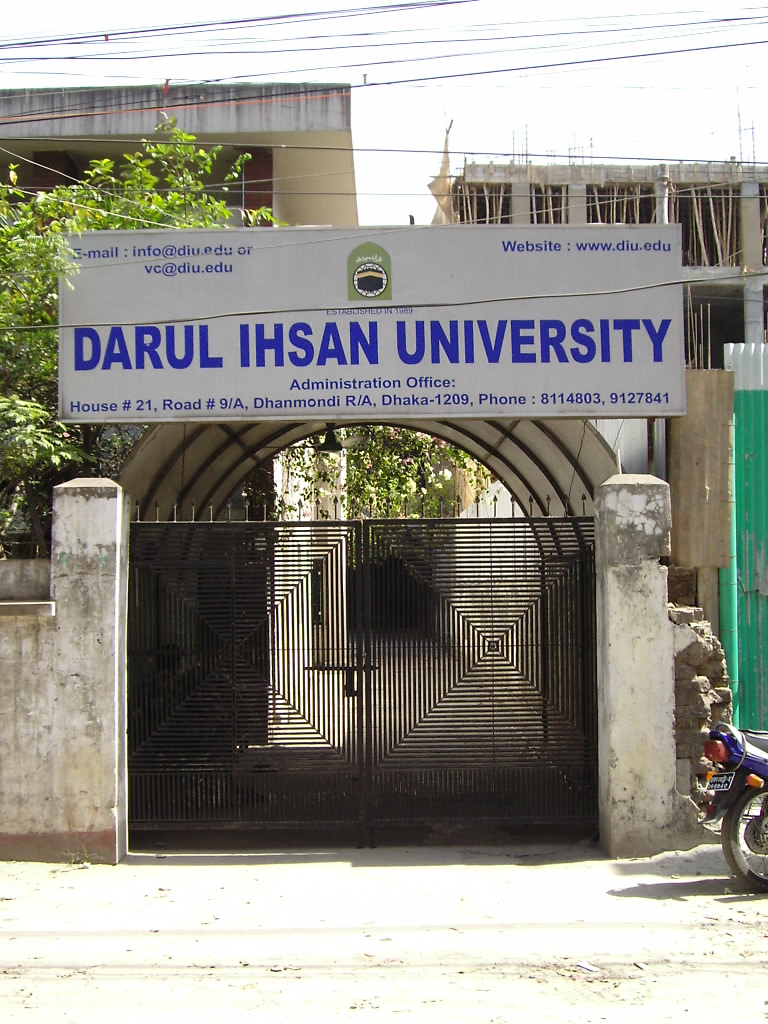
- Main gate of the university
- Type: Private
- Active: 1993; 33 years ago–2016
- Founder: Syed Ali Ashraf
- Chancellor: President Hafiz Uddin Ahmad
- Vice-Chancellor: None
- Location: House No. 21, Road No. 9/A, Dhanmondi R/A, Dhaka, 1209, Bangladesh; 23.7469°N 90.3756°E
- Campus: Urban

Darul Ihsan University (Bengali: দারুল ইহসান বিশ্ববিদ্যালয়) or DIU was a private university in Dhaka, Bangladesh. It was founded by Syed Ali Ashraf in 1989. The government of Bangladesh accredited it as a private university in 1993. The Education Ministry shut down the university on 26 July 2016 for illegally operating numerous branch campuses and for selling higher degree certificates.

== Areas of studies ==
=== Faculties ===
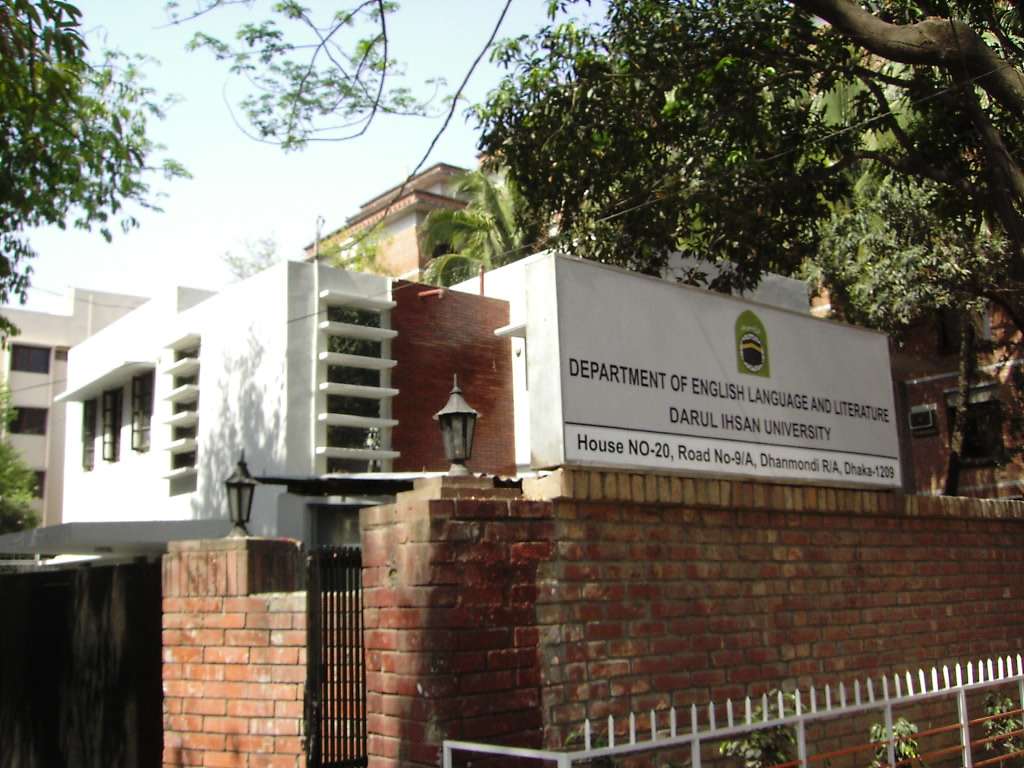
Department of English Language and Literature, Darul Ihsan University

1. Faculty of Religious Sciences
2. Faculty of Human Sciences
3. Faculty of Natural Sciences
4. Faculty of Business Administration

== Convocation ==
- 1st Convocation was held on 13 March 1997 in the BaliBhadra, Savar, Dhaka. The number of graduating students was 244.
- 2nd Convocation was held on 27 March 2002 in the Bangladesh National Museum, Dhaka. The number of graduating students was 601.
- 3rd Convocation was held on 21 December 2003 in the Bangladesh China Friendship Conference Center, Sher-e Bangla Nagar, Dhaka.

== Controversy ==
An undercover team of ETV, a Bangladeshi television channel, was able to purchase certificates with 40,000 taka.

The University Grants Commission (UGC) repeatedly warned students to be careful about admission to Darul Ihsan University. The authorities of the university were divided in four separate groups and running their activities form different campuses. As of August 2017, the university was functioning under a stay order from the court. The university is legally closed.

== See also ==
- List of Islamic educational institutions
