= Zakhmona =

- Directed by: Shahid Usman
- Release date: June 26, 2017
- Country: Pakistan
- Language: Pashto

Zakhmona (Urdu: زخمونہ) is a 2017 Pashto action thriller film made by Shahid Usman. It was released on 26 June 2017.
