= Alokdia, Jhalokati =

Alokdia
- Village
- Location in Bangladesh
- Coordinates: 22°43′N 90°16′E
- Country: Bangladesh
- Division: Barisal Division
- District: Jhalokati District
- Time zone: UTC+06:00 (Bangladesh Time)

Alokdia is a village in Jhalokati District in the Barisal Division of southern-central Bangladesh. It also shares the same name with another village in Magura, Khulna and Feni, Chittagong.
