= Mohammed Ehteshamuddin =

Pakistani TV director

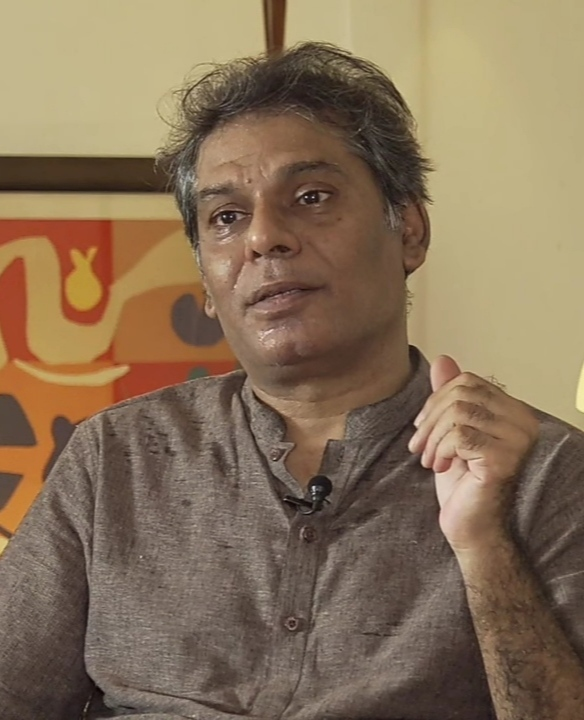
- Ehteshamuddin in 2023
- Born: Karachi, Pakistan
- Occupations: Director; Producer; Screenwriter; Actor
- Years active: 1990-present

Mohammed Ehteshamuddin (Urdu: محمد احتشام الدین) is a Pakistani director, producer, screenwriter and actor who works in cinema and television.

Ehtesham's short films Shahrukh Khan Ki Maut (2005) and Mein Sawa Paanch Bujay Aai Thi (2006) featured at the 2005 and 2006 Kara Film Festival. In addition, his two dramas and a film, Sadqay Tumhare (2014), Aseerzadi and Chambaili (2013) won Hum Award and ARY Film Award nominations. In 2015, he won the Hum Award for Best Director Drama Serial for Sadqay Tumhare.

== Early life ==
Ehteshamuddin was born in Karachi, growing up in a colony with a lot of migrants from Hyderabad State, including many writers, which he says influenced his early artistic inclination, because as a child he used to frequent literary gatherings involving the rehearsal of classical plays as well as short stories and poetry.

He graduated with a degree in commerce from the Karachi University, working for the Sui Southern Gas Company, and also joined various theater groups, including Tehrik-e-Niswan, Katha and Theatre Circle. In 1998, he was selected by United Nations Development Programme, Pakistan for a course in television production at the Pakistan Television Academy, Islamabad.

== Career ==
In 2013, he played the lead role of a visionary journalist and poet in the film Chambaili, for which he was nominated in the Best Supporting Actor and Best Star Debut - Male categories at the 1st ARY Film Awards.

== Filmography ==
=== Television ===
Year	Title	Role	Credited as			Notes	Ref.
Year	Title	Role	Director	Writer	Producer	Notes	Ref.
2005	Shahrukh Khan Ki Maut	—	Yes	Yes		Short film	
2005	Victoria Ka Ticket	—		Yes		Short film	
2006	Duniya Goal Hai	—		Yes		Short film	
2006	Mein Sawa Paanch Bujay Aai Thi	—	Yes	Yes		Short film	
2007	Chandda	—	Yes			Short film	
2007	Daar Se Bichray	—	Yes			Short film	
2007	Yeh Hindustan Woh Pakistan	—	Yes	Yes		Short film	
2008	Mukti	—	Yes			Short film	
2010	Baitullaham	—	Yes			Short film	
2010	Perfume Chowk	—	Yes				
2010	Zaibu ke Paas	—	Yes			Short film	
2011	Chup ka Shor	—	Yes			Short film	
2011	Zaahra	—	Yes			Short film	
2012	Thandi Deewarain	—	Yes			Telefilm	
2013–14	Aseerzadi	—	Yes				
2013	Zindagi Ab Bhi Muskurati Hai	—	Yes			Telefilm	
2014	Sadqay Tumhare	—	Yes				
2015–16	Preet Na Kariyo Koi	—	Yes				
2015–16	Abro	Zafar					
2016	Udaari	—	Yes				
2016	Kitni Girhain Baaki Hain (season 2)	Saleem				Episode 7	
2017	Yaqeen Ka Safar	Khalil					
2017	Mohabbat.PK	—	Yes				
2017	Yeh Raha Dil	Dilber Jahangir 'DJ'					
2018–19	Aangan	—	Yes				
2021–22	Khaab Toot Jaatay Hain	Syed Sajjad Hussain	Yes		Yes	Mini-series	
2023	Kuch Ankahi	Shagufta's father					
2023	Yunhi	—	Yes				
2023	Kabuli Pulao	Haji Mushtaq					
2024	Inspector Sabiha	DIG Akbar				Mini-series	

=== Films ===
Year	Title	Role	Director	Notes	Ref.
2013	Chambaili	Moosa			
2016	Maalik	Master Mohsin			
2016	Actor in Law	Lawyer		Cameo	
2019	Superstar	—	Yes	Directorial debut	
2021	Yorker	Policeman		Short film	
2022	Dum Mastam	—	Yes		
2026	Khan Tumhara	—	Yes		

== Awards and nominations ==
Year	Award	Category	Work	Result	Ref.
2013	ARY Film Awards	ARY Film Award for Best Supporting Actor	Chambaili	Nominated	
2013	ARY Film Awards	ARY Film Award for Best Star Debut - Male	Chambaili	Nominated	
2015	Hum Awards	Best Director Drama Serial	Sadqay Tumhare	Won	
2016	Lux Style Awards	Best TV Director	Sadqay Tumhare	Nominated	
2017	Hum Awards	Best Director Drama Serial	Udaari	Won	
2017	Lux Style Awards	Best TV Director	Udaari	Won	
2020	Lux Style Awards	Best Film Director	Superstar	Nominated	
2020	Lux Style Awards	Best TV Director	Aangan	Nominated	
