= Shahid Khan (actor) =

Pakistani film actor

- Born: Peshawar, Pakistan
- Citizenship: Pakistani
- Occupation: Actor
- Years active: 1991

Shahid Khan is a Pakistani film actor and producer.

== Early life ==
He was born into a Pushtoon family in Khazana village, of Peshawar, in the Khyber Pakhtunkhwa province.

== Film career ==
Shahid Khan has been acting in the Peshawar film industry of Pakistan since the 1990s and has contributed to various films of the industry. He and his brother Arshad Khan produce and direct Pashto films as well. Khan has contributed to the Pashto film industry, headquartered in Peshawar, at a time of its revival in Pakistan.

Khan has spoken of the importance of making Pashto films more suitable for city audiences, saying "We cannot limit our films to Pashtun culture as we have to exhibit them in other markets."

In 2015, Khan was prevented from filming in the Hazara District due to government restrictions. Khan released a statement saying that there were only a handful of film makers left in the industry and that the government should support them rather than putting sanctions on them.

== Filmography ==
Year	Film	Language
1991	Adam khor	Pashto
1992	Bala	Pashto
2008	Yarana	Pashto
2012	Fakhar-e-afghan	Pashto
2013	Ziddi Pakhtun	Pashto
2013	Sarkar	Pashto
2013	Mast Malang	Pashto
2013	Pekhawray Badmash	Pashto
2013	Dirty Girl	Pashto
2013	Gandagir	Pashto
2013	Love Story	Pashto
2013	Super Girl	Urdu
2015	Daagh	Pashto
2015	Nawe Da Yawe Shpe	Pashto
2015	Ma Cheera Ghareeb Sara	Pashto
2015	Charta Khanan Charta Malangan	Pashto
2016	Haidar Khan	Pashto
2016	Anjaam	Pashto
2016	Lewane pakhtoon	Pashto
2016	Khabara da izzat da	Pashto
2016	Raja	Pashto
2016	Badmashi Ba Mani	Pashto
2017	Sudagar	Pashto
2017	Khanadani Jawargar	Pashto
2017	Stargi Sri Na Manam	Pashto
2017	Giraftar	Pashto
2017	Duskhushi Ba Mani	Pashto
2017	Shaddal Zalmy	Pashto
2020	Yo bal dedan	Pashto
2024	cha kram badamala	Pashto
