= List of Pakistani films of 2018 =

List of Pakistani films by year 2018

This is a list of Pakistani films released in 2018. Jawani Phir Nahi Ani 2 was the all time grossing Pakistani film released on EidulAzha for this year.

== Highest grossing films ==
The top 10 films released in 2018 by worldwide gross are as follows:

Background color indicates the current releases

Highest-grossing films of 2018
Rank	Title	Studio	Gross	Ref.
1	Jawani Phir Nahi Ani 2	Six Sigma Plus; Salman Iqbal Films; ARY Films	Rs. 73.00 crore (US$2.6 million)	
2	Teefa in Trouble	Lightingale Productions; Geo Films	Rs. 50.00 crore (US$1.8 million)	
3	Parwaaz Hai Junoon	Momina & Duraid Films	Rs. 43.20 crore (US$1.5 million)	
4	The Donkey King	Talisman Studios; Geo Films	Rs. 40.20 crore (US$1.4 million)	
5	Parchi	IRK Films; ARY Films	Rs. 17.10 crore (US$610,000)	
6	Load Wedding	Filmwala Pictures	Rs. 13.50 crore (US$480,000)	
7	7 Din Mohabbat In	Excellency Films; Dawn Films	Rs. 13.00 crore (US$470,000)	
8	Cake	Parvez Malik Films; Excellency Films	Rs. 12.00 crore (US$430,000)	
9	Azaadi	Excellency Films; ARY Films	Rs. 8.40 crore (US$300,000)	
10	Wajood	Jawed Sheikh Films	Rs. 8.00 crore (US$290,000)	

== Events ==
=== Award ceremonies ===
Date	Event	Host	Location
22 February 2018	17th Lux Style Awards	Vasay Chaudhry	Karachi, Pakistan
28 July 2018	6th Hum Awards	Bushra Ansari and Ahmad Ali Butt	Hamilton, Ontario, Toronto, Canada
1 September 2018	3rd Hum Style Awards	Syra Shehroz	Karachi, Pakistan
9 September 2018	2nd IPPA Awards	Ali Kazmi	London, England

=== Film festivals ===
Date	Event	Host	Location	Ref.
30 March - 2 April	Pakistan International Film Festival (PIFF)		Karachi, Pakistan	
6 to 9 July	2nd Pakistan Film Festival (New York)	Maliha Lodhi	New York, United States	

== Releases ==
=== January – April ===
Opening		Title	Director	Cast	Ref.
JAN	5	Parchi	Azfar Jafri	Hareem Farooq, Ali Rehman Khan, Shafqat Cheema, Ahmed Ali, Usman Mukhtar, Shafqat Khan, Faiza Saleem	
FEB	2	Allahyar & The Legend of Markhor	Uzair Zaheer Khan	Produced by 3rd World Studios :- Characters voiced by: Natasha Humera Ejaz, Ali Noor	
FEB	2	Maan Jao Na	Aabis Raza	Elnaaz Norouzi, Adeel Chaudhry, Ayaz Samoo, Hajra Yameen, Ghana Ali, Naeem Haq, Asif Raza Mir, Asma Abbas, Nayyer Ejaz	
FEB	2	Pari	Syed Atif Ali	Qavi Khan, Rasheed Naz, Saleem Mairaj	
FEB	9	Azad	Rehan Sheikh	Sanam Saeed, Rehan Sheikh, Nimra Bucha, Angeline Malik, Zahid Ahmed, Salman Shahid, Sabreen Hisbani, Imran Abbas	
FEB	16	Aks	Asif Parvez	Roma Khan, Faiza Asif, Arslan Sheraz, Jyoti Doger, Shyraa Roy, Meera, Fahad Rajpoot	
MAR	23	Tick Tock	Umer Hassan	Ahsan Khan, Alyy Khan, Maria Memon and Ghulam Mohiuddin	
MAR	30	Cake	Asim Abbasi	Aamina Sheikh, Sanam Saeed, Adnan Malik, Faris Khalid, Hira Hussain	
APR	20	Motorcycle Girl	Adnan Sarwar	Sohai Ali Abro, Samina Peerzada	
APR	25	Your Order Has Arrived	Hassan Islma	Hassan Islam, Many More	

=== May – August ===
Opening		Title	Director	Cast	Ref.
JUN	EID	7 Din Mohabbat In	Meenu Gaur & Farjad Nabi	Mahira Khan, Sheheryar Munawar, Jawed Sheikh, Amna Ilyas, Ayesha Omer, Hina Dilpazeer, Mira Sethi, Imran Aslam, Rimal Ali, Aamir Qureshi.	
JUN	EID	Azaadi	Imran Malik	Moammar Rana, Sonya Hussain, Nadeem Baig	
JUN	EID	Na Band Na Baraati	Mehmood Akhtar	Mikaal Zulfiqar, Shayan Khan, Qavi Khan, Ali Kazmi and Atiqa Odho	
JUN	EID	Wajood	Jawed Sheikh	Danish Taimoor, Saeeda Imtiaz	
JUN	29	Shor Sharaba	Hasnain Hyderabadwala	Adnan Khan, Rabi Peerzada, Meera	
JUL	6	Jackpot	Shoaib Khan	Jawed Sheikh, Noor Hassan Rizvi, Sanam Chaudhry, Sana Fakhar	
JUL	20	Teefa in Trouble	Ahsan Rahim	Ali Zafar, Maya Ali	
AUG	EID	Jawani Phir Nahi Ani 2	Nadeem Baig	Humayun Saeed, Ahmed Ali Butt, Fahad Mustafa, Mawra Hocane Kubra Khan, Vasay Chaudhry, Uzma Khan, Sarwat Gilani	
AUG	EID	Load Wedding	Nabeel Qureshi	Fahad Mustafa, Mehwish Hayat, Samina Ahmed, Noor Ul Hasan, Faiza Hasan, Qaiser Piya	
AUG	EID	Parwaaz Hai Junoon	Haseeb Hassan	Hamza Ali Abbasi, Ahad Raza Mir, Hania Amir, Kubra Khan	
AUG	15	Indus Blues	Jawad Sharif	Mai Dhai, Krishan Laal Bheel, Faqir Zulfiqar, Ejaz Sarhadi, Sachu Khan, Zohaib Hassan, Ustad Ziauddin	

=== September – December ===
Opening		Title	Director	Cast	Ref.
OCT	13	The Donkey King	Aziz Jindani	Jan Rambo, Ismail Tara, Hina Dilpazeer, Ghulam Mohiuddin, Jawed Sheikh	
OCT	15	72 Ghantay	Anjum Parvez	Mohsin Mushtaq, Anjum Parvez, Rukhsar Ali, Diya Butt, Honey Albela, Sadaf, Shahzada Baghi, Ibrar Hashmi, Mishi	
NOV	23	Altered Skin	Adnan Ahmed	Robin Dunne, Salman Shahid, Nimra Bucha, Khalid Aman, Mansha Pasha, Ali Kazmi and Aamir Qureshi.	
DEC	7	Pinky Memsaab	Shazia Ali Khan	Hajra Yamin, Kiran Malik, Adnan Jafar, Khalid Ahmed, Hajra Khan and Shameem Hilaly	
DEC	14	3 Bahadur: Rise of the Warriors	Sharmeen Obaid-Chinoy	Zuhab Khan, Arisha Razi, Bashar Shafi, Mehwish Hayat, Fahad Mustafa, Sarwat Gillani, Nimra Bucha, Behroze Sabzwari, Sarwan Ali Palijo	
DEC	17	Nagin	Ahmad Virk	Kiran Malik, Farooq Ali Sheikh, Usman Chaudhary, Maqsood Anwar, Naveed Khan, Asif Shahzad	
