= 18th Lux Style Awards =

Entertainment industry awards in Pakistan

- Date: 7 July 2019
- Site: Expo Center, Karachi
- Hosted by: Sheheryar Munawar; Maya Ali; Mehwish Hayat
- Produced by: Catwalk Event Management & Productions; NJ Productions
- Directed by: Frieha Altaf
- Organized by: Unilever Pakistan

Television coverage
- Network: Geo Entertainment

The 18th Lux Style Awards was an award ceremony presented by Lux to honour the best in fashion, music, films and 2018 in Pakistani television, took place on 7 July 2019 at Expo Center, Karachi, Sindh and broadcast by Geo Entertainment.

- 17th Lux Style Awards

== Film ==
Nominees for 18th Lux Style Awards were announced on 4 March 2019.

Category	Winners	Nominations
Best Film	Cake-Syed Zulfikar Bukhari	Jawani Phir Nahi Ani 2-Salman Iqbal, Humayun Saeed and Shahzad Nasib; Load Wedding-Fizza Ali Meerza; Motorcycle Girl-Adnan Sarwar; Teefa in Trouble-Ali Zafar
Best Film Director	Ahsan Rahim-Teefa in Trouble	Asim Abbasi - Cake; Haseeb Hassan-Parwaaz Hai Junoon; Nabeel Qureshi-Load Wedding; Nadeem Baig-Jawani Phir Nahi Ani 2
Best Film Actor	Viewers' Choice: Ali Zafar–Teefa in Trouble; Critics' Choice: Fahad Mustafa–Load Wedding	Syed Mohammad Ahmed–Cake; Ahmed Ali Butt–Jawani Phir Nahi Ani 2; Adnan Malik-Cake
Best Film Actress	Viewers' Choice: Mehwish Hayat-Load Wedding; Critics' Choice: Sohai Ali Abro–Motorcycle Girl	Aamina Sheikh–Cake; Hajra Yamin–Pinky Memsaab; Sanam Saeed–Cake
Best Film Playback	Atif Aslam-'Thaam Lo'-Parwaaz Hai Junoon	Mulazim Hussain & Missal Zaidi-'Good Luck'-Load Wedding; Arif Lohar-'Tillay Wali Jooti'-Jawani Phir Nahi Ani 2; Shuja Haider-'Donkey Nacha'-The Donkey King

== Television ==
Category	Winner	Nominations
Best Television Play	Suno Chanda (Hum TV)	Dil Mom Ka Diya (ARY Digital); Aisi Hai Tanhai (ARY Digital); Dar Si Jaati Hai Sila (Hum TV); Khaani (Geo TV)
Best Television Director	Kashif Nisar-Dar Si Jaati Hai Sila-(Hum TV)	Shahid Shafaat-Dil Mom Ka Diya (ARY Digital); Anjum Shahzad-Khaani (Geo TV); Ahson Talish-Suno Chanda (Hum TV); Qasim Ali Mureed-Aangan (ARY Digital)
Best Television Actor	Viewers' Choice: Feroze Khan-Khaani (Geo TV); Critics' Choice: Noman Ijaz (Dar Si Jaati Hai Sila-Hum TV)	Qavi Khan-Aangan (ARY Digital); Sami Khan-Khudgarz (ARY Digital); Bilal Abbas-Balaa (ARY Digital)
Best Television Actress	Viewers' Choice: Iqra Aziz-Suno Chanda (Hum TV); Critics' Choice: Iqra Aziz-Suno Chanda (Hum TV)	Sana Javed-Khaani (Geo TV); Sonya Hussain-Aisi Hai Tanhai (ARY Digital); Neelam Muneer-Dil Mom Ka Diya (ARY Digital); Ushna Shah-Balaa (ARY Digital)
Best Television Writer	Bee Gul-Dar Si Jaati Hai Sila-Hum TV	Zanjabeel Asim Shah-Balaa (ARY Digital); Faiza Iftikhar-Aangan (ARY Digital); Asma Nabeel-Khaani (Geo TV); Amna Mufti-Ghughi (TV One)
Best Emergening Talent in Television	Rida Bilal-Khudgarz (ARY)	Osama Tahir-Dar Si Jaati Hai Sila (Hum TV); Nabeel Zubairi-Suno Chanda (Hum TV); Amar Khan-Belapur Ki Dayan (Hum TV); Zubab Rana-Mere Khudaya (ARY Digital)
Best Television Track	Khaani (Geo TV)	Naulakha (TV One); Ghughi (TV One); Dar Si Jaati Hai Sila (Hum TV); Aangan (Hum TV)

=== Criticism ===
Criticism came from audience that Yumna Zaidi was snubbed for not being nominated despite giving a powerful performance in Dar Si Jaati Hai Sila.Many have argued that Suno Chanda (Best Television Play winner) did not age well compared to the other nominated dramas like Dar Si Jaati Hai Sila and Dil Mom Ka Diya, both of which were the most acclaimed dramas of that year. There is also a discourse over Iqra Aziz's double win for Suno Chanda, accordingly to critics Neelam Muneer could have easily won either of the awards as she gave a much more dynamic performance in Dil Mom Ka Diya.

== Music ==
Category	Winner	Nominations
Best Song of the Year	Ya Qurban-Khumariyan	Rang De-Chand Tara Orchestra
Best Singer of the Year	Mohsin Abbas Haider & Sohail Asghar-Na Ja	Khurram-Oki Jane; Bilal Ali of Kashmir-Khuwab; Shamoon Ismail-Marijuana
Best Emergening Talent in Music	Saakin	Abdullah Sidiqui; Nehaal Naseem; Amna Aslam; Sami Imiri

== Special ==
=== Chairperson's Lifetime Achievement Award ===
- Shabnam
