= Sorry: A Love Story =

Upcoming Pakistani romantic drama film

- Directed by: Sohail Javed
- Written by: Sohail Javed; Asma Nabeel
- Starring: Faysal Qureshi; Faryal Mehmood; Zahid Ahmed; Aamina Sheikh
- Production companies: SJ Films; Faysal Qureshi Films
- Country: Pakistan
- Language: Urdu

Sorry: A Love Story is an unreleased Pakistani romantic drama film. The film features Faysal Qureshi, Faryal Mehmood, Zahid Ahmed and Aamina Sheikh in leading roles. Sorry: A Love Story is written and directed by Sohail Javed. Production of the film was interrupted by the COVID-19 pandemic. It was later announced to be discontinued in July 2022.

== Cast ==
- Faysal Qureshi
- Faryal Mehmood
- Zahid Ahmed
- Aamina Sheikh
- Sonya Hussyn
