= Tick Tock (film) =

- Film poster
- Directed by: Omar Hassan
- Written by: Omair Alavi and Sana Tauseef
- Produced by: Sana Tauseef
- Starring: Ahsan Khan; Alyy Khan; Maria Memon
- Music by: Imran – Emu
- Production company: S4 Solutions Productions
- Distributed by: Hum Films; Eveready Studios
- Release date: 23 March 2018
- Country: Pakistan
- Language: Urdu

Tick Tock (Urdu: ٹک ٹک) is a Pakistani animated film directed by Omar Hassan and written by Omair Alavi and Sana Tauseef. The film is produced by Sana Tauseef. The story follows history buffs Hassan and Daanya, who embark upon a time travel adventure along with their teacher KK. The film casts Ahsan Khan, Alyy Khan and Maria Memon is the lead roles. The film was released on 23 March 2018 under the Hum Films Banner.

== Plot ==
The story evolves into a fun-filled adventure as they meet the greatest heroes of Pakistani history and overcome all the negative forces to keep the timeline intact. Adventurous twists and turns packed with fun and action makes this movie a spellbinding and unique experience for kids.

== Production Studio ==
The film is produced by S4 Solutions which is a media production house which is well known for pioneering marketing and musical events, recently it has won the 2016 Kara Film Award for its documentary 'Returning Home'.

== Cast ==
- Ahsan Khan
- Alyy Khan
- Maria Memon
- Ghulam Mohiuddin

== Release ==
The film was distributed by Hum Films and Eveready Studios throughout Pakistan on 23 March 2018; The film also had a TV Premiere on World TV on 9 September 2018.

== See also ==
- List of Pakistani animated films
- List of Pakistani films of 2018
