= Dil Diyan Gallan (disambiguation) =

Dil Diyan Gallan (transl. Talks of the heart in Punjabi) may refer to:

- "Dil Diyan Gallan" (song), a Punjabi and Hindi-language romantic song by Vishal–Shekhar and Atif Aslam from the 2017 Indian film Tiger Zinda Hai
- Dil Diyan Gallan (film), a 2018 Pakistani Urdu-language television film
- Dil Diyaan Gallaan, a 2022 Indian Hindi-language television series
- Dil Diyan Gallan with Sonam Bajwa, an Indian Punjabi-language television talk show hosted by Sonam Bajwa
