= Parwaaz Hai Junoon =

2017 Pakistani film by Haseeb Hassan

- Film poster
- Directed by: Haseeb Hassan
- Written by: Farhat Ishtiaq
- Produced by: Momina Duraid
- Starring: Hamza Ali Abbasi; Ahad Raza Mir; Hania Aamir; Shaz Khan; Kubra Khan
- Cinematography: Kaka Tong; Salman Razzak; Farhan Hafeez
- Production company: Abdul Mannan
- Distributed by: Hum Films
- Release date: 22 August 2018 (Eid al-Adha)
- Running time: 130 min
- Country: Pakistan
- Languages: Urdu; English
- Budget: Rs. 12 crore (US$430,000)
- Box office: Rs. 43.25 crore (US$1.5 million)

Parwaaz Hai Junoon (Urdu: پرواز ہے جنون; lit: Soaring is Passion) is a 2018 Pakistani aerial combat-war romantic film, directed by Haseeb Hassan (in his directorial debut), produced by Momina Duraid and written by Farhat Ishtiaq. The film features an ensemble cast of Hamza Ali Abbasi, Ahad Raza Mir, Hania Aamir, Kubra Khan, Alamdar Khan, Marina Khan, Shamoon Abbasi, Adnan Jaffar, Shaz Khan, Shafaat Ali, and Mustafa Changazi in pivotal roles. Earlier, Osman Khalid Butt was also a part of the film but had to withdraw as the film's shoot schedule clashed with his promotions for Balu Mahi. The film is a tribute to Pakistan Air Force.

It was released on Eid al-Adha, 24 August 2018, under Momina & Duraid Films and was distributed by Hum Films. It is the seventh-highest-grossing Pakistani film of all time.

== Plot ==
In the picturesque mountainsides on the outskirts of Islamabad, Pakistan, Sania (Hania Amir) finds solace in watching PAF jets soar through the skies. The narrative opens with an intense dogfight between PAF JF-17s, piloted by Hamza Haider Ali (Hamza Ali Abbasi) and Nadir Kirmani (Shaz Khan), and enemy Mirage 2000s infiltrating Pakistani airspace. Hamza’s daring manoeuvres lead to victory and, despite being reprimanded for taking dangerous risks, he draws inspiration from the legacy of Squadron Leader Sarfaraz Ahmed Rafique.

A group of aspiring PAF fighter pilots, including Saad Khan (Ahad Raza Mir), Rashid Minhas Yousufzai (Sikander Vincent Khan Yousafzai), Zaid Ali (Shafaat Ali), Shamir Hamid, and female cadets Sania and Ujala, begin their journey at the PAF Academy. Sania faces scepticism because of her physical attributes, but her unwavering love for Pakistan earns her a place. The diverse group undergoes rigorous training, marked by humorous encounters and Saad’s initial arrogance, particularly towards Sania and the female cadets.

Meanwhile, Hamza, while preparing for Nadir’s wedding to Fiza, Sania’s cousin, meets Sania. Their playful interactions gradually blossom into a romance, with motorcycle rides and tea in the mountains becoming cherished moments for them both. Hamza’s commitment to serving as a fighter pilot, like his father before him, sparks playful banter about choosing between love and duty. As terrorist attacks increase, Hamza and Nadir are selected for critical bombing missions against Taliban militants.

Back at the academy, Saad’s jealousy intensifies, particularly as Rashid continues to excel. Zaid leaves the Air Force, emotionally affecting his friends. Sania faces numerous challenges, with Saad occasionally mocking her while also offering genuine advice. The plot takes a poignant turn when Hamza’s marriage plans encounter parental opposition, leading to a life-altering decision.

A Taliban attack near civilians prompts Hamza to carry out a heroic low-altitude strike, resulting in critical injuries and his eventual martyrdom. Hamza’s father, initially dismissive, undergoes a transformation after meeting Sania at Hamza’s grave. The narrative reveals that Sania’s journey, driven by both patriotism and her relationship with Hamza, had always been intertwined with fulfilling Hamza’s dream.

In the present day, Saad confronts his misplaced jealousy and learns about Rashid’s fiancée, Sherbatgul. Realising the baselessness of his fears, Saad apologises, and a humorous dinner scene follows. At the graduation ceremony, Sania, Saad, and Rashid receive honours, with senior officers, including a decorated Nadir, in attendance. The film concludes with Sania finding peace in the mountains while reminiscing about Hamza, alongside a hopeful scene of Saad and Sania, now flying JF-17s, hinting at a possible romance. The final vision of Hamza’s spirit saluting encapsulates the enduring impact of their journey.

== Cast ==
- Hamza Ali Abbasi as Sq/Ldr Hamza Ali Haider
- Hania Aamir as Flying officer Sania Taimoor
- Ahad Raza Mir as Flying officer Saad Khan
- Shaz Khan as Sq/Ldr Nadir Kirmani
- Kubra Khan as Fizza Nadir Kirmani
- Shafaat Ali as Aviation Cadet Zaid Ali
- Sikandar Vincent Khan as Flying officer Rashid Minhas Yousafzai
- Rachel Viccaji as Flying officer Ujala
- Mustafa Changezi as Flying officer Rashid
- Sabeena Syed as Diya
- Alamdar Khan as Adil
- Adnan Jaffar as OC Flying Taimoor
- Arslan Asad Butt as Air Force student

=== Special appearance ===
- Marina Khan as Sania's mother
- Asif Raza Mir as Haider Ali
- Hina Khawaja Bayat as Shehla
- Annie Zaidi as Sania's aunt
- Farhan Ally Agha as Ali
- Rasheed Naz as waiter
- Shamoon Abbasi
- Irfan Ahmed
- Faisal Nawaz
- Solat Hameed
- Asif Samad
- Jibran
- Shahnawaz Khan
- Ahsen Abdul Sattar
- Israr Shaheed

== Production ==
=== Development and casting ===
According to director of media affairs PAF Syed Mohammad Ali and Momina Duraid, the film is intended to be a tribute to Pakistan Air Force with stories inspired from real life. Duraid also announced that all of the major earnings from the film will be donated to PAF funds. The casting of Hamza Ali Abbasi and Osman Khalid Butt was announced at the launch event of the film, with real-life members of the Pakistan Air Force comprising the rest of the cast. Few days later Osman had to withdraw as the film's shoot schedule clashed with his promotions for Balu Mahi and was replaced by Ahad Raza Mir. Farhat Ishtiaq wrote the film's script. The final cast includes Hamza Ali Abbasi, Ahad Raza Mir, Kubra Khan, Hania Aamir, Shaz Khan, Marina Khan and Shamoon Abbasi.

=== Filming ===
In an Interview to Daily Pakistan, Hamza Ali Abbasi confirmed that much of the filming was done at various places in Pakistan such as cities which included Saidpur, Murree, Sargodha and Lahore, as well as Karachi. The director Haseeb Hassan also revealed that some parts of the film were shot on K2 and the Karakoram Highway.

== Release ==
Two separate teasers of the film was released, first teaser, featuring Hamza Ali Abbasi and Shaz Khan was released on 19 April 2018, while the second teaser featuring Ahad Raza Mir and Hania Amir was released on 23 April 2018. The trailer of the film was released on 6 July 2018. Initially, the film was set to release on Eid al-Fitr 2018, but due to the limited screens available, it was postponed until Eid al-Adha 2018. After the delay, the film was released on Eid al-Adha worldwide, 22 August 2018. It had a premiere event in London on the same day, after previous premieres were cancelled due to some issues with Central Board of Film Censors. It is the second Pakistani film after Parchi which is screened in Saudi Arabia and the first in China after forty years.

=== Box office ===
Parwaaz Hai Junoon opened to a good response on the first day of its release and managed to collect Rs. 1.79 crore despite massive clash at the local box office. The film also collected Rs. 34 lac Internationally, taking its first day total collection to Rs. 2.132 crores. Worldwide figures after two days were around Rs. 5.45 crore after collecting Rs. 2.66 crore and Rs. 66 lac from local box office and from overseas markets respectively on second day. On its third day of release, it grossed around Rs. 2.43 crores from Pakistan and Rs. 86 lac from international markets respectively, bringing the total nett collections to Rs. 8.74 crores. Film grossed Rs. 12.684 crores worldwide, after four days of its release. Film's global nett gross after one week was around Rs. 18.18 crores. Within second week of release, it collected Rs. 21.11 crores at local box office, breaking the record of Teefa in Trouble and Punjab Nahi Jaungi of fastest to Rs. 200 crores locally. After ten days, It collected Rs. 28.12 crores at global box office. It collected Rs. 360.2 crore locally until the end of 2018. After its release in China in November 2020, the film collected US$248,000 there lifetime.

=== Critical response ===
Shahjehan Saleem of Something Haute rated the film 2.5 stars out of 5 and said, "despite having major problems script-wise, the film is extremely strong in its aesthetics and acting skills".

Omair Alavi rated the film 3 out of 5 stars and wrote to Brandsynario, "It is shot like a TV drama and comes out as one too, despite some very attractive aerial shots where cadets train and pilots unleash their weapons on enemies". Hamza Shafique of Dubai Desi rated the film 3.5 out of 5 stars and wrote, "Overall a very well made, performed and directed product which suffers only from it's [sic] TV drama serial style screenplay and story telling. The performances by the principle cast [sic] and the infused patriotism through brilliantly shot Pakistan Air force sequences never let you get bored but doesn't excite you either". The editor of Oye yeah gave a somewhat positive review and praised the direction and marked, " as a film PHJ has little novelty to offer. The recipe has been over been oversold. The changing the sides didn’t much of a difference.It’s a story we have heard before, wanting us to shed tears we have shed before!". Asjad Khan of HIP gave a positive review but criticised the script and praised the performances.

Hamna Zubair of Images Dawn gave a mixed review and wrote "PHJ may leave the audience with renewed respect for the air force but as a viewer, you may only truly enjoy its silly bits, and that's troubling for a film that's not a comedy".

=== Accolades ===
Ceremony	Won	Nominated
18th Lux Style Awards	Atif Aslam for "Thaam Lo" – Best Playback Singer	Haseeb Hassan – Best Director

== Soundtrack ==
All lyrics are written by Shakeel Sohail; all music is composed by Azaan Sami khan.

No.	Title	Singer(s)	Length
1.	"Bhulleya"	Mustehsan Khan	2:53
2.	"Thaam Lo"	Atif Aslam
3.	"Naache Re"	Zeb Bangash, Jabar Abbas	4:18
4.	"Main Urra"	Shuja Haider	3:43
5.	"Aik Hai"	Shahid Amin	4:41
6.	"Musafir"	Farhan Saeed, Zenab Fatimah Sultan	4:00

== See also ==
- List of Pakistani films of 2018
- Aircraft in fiction
- Fighter (2024 film)
