= Hajra Khan =

Hajra Khan may refer to one of the following

- Hajra Khan (footballer), Pakistani footballer
- Hajra Khan (actress), Pakistani actress
