= Sadqay Tumhare =

2014 Pakistani biographical television series

- صدقے تمہارے
- Written by: Khalil-Ur-Rehman Qamar
- Directed by: Mohammed Ehteshamuddin
- Starring: Mahira Khan; Adnan Malik
- Theme music composer: Mad Music
- Opening theme: Haaye Re Hum Sadqay Tumharay by Rahat Fateh Ali Khan and Akmal Khan
- Composers: Sahir Ali Bagga; Sohail Haider
- Country of origin: Pakistan
- Original languages: Urdu; Punjabi
- No. of seasons: 1
- No. of episodes: 27

Production
- Producers: Momina Duraid; Samina Humayun Saeed; Tariq Shah
- Production locations: Lahore, Interior Punjab, Sialkot, Sambrial
- Cinematography: Illyas Kashmiri; Tameen Nizami
- Editors: Mehmood Ali; Tanveer Ali; Afzal Fayaaz
- Camera setup: Multi-camera setup
- Running time: 36–43 minutes

Original release
- Network: Hum TV
- Release: 10 October 2014 – 10 April 2015

Sadqay Tumhare (Urdu: صدقے تمہارے, lit. 'May My Years Be Added To Yours') is a Pakistani autobiographical drama television series based on the life of the series' writer Khalil-Ur-Rehman Qamar. It is directed by Mohammed Ehteshamuddin and co-produced by Momina Duraid, Samina Humayun Saeed and Tariq Ahmad Shah. It stars Mahira Khan, Samiya Mumtaz and Adnan Malik, who made his acting debut with this serial.

Based on the writer's real life love story, the series set in the 1980s, revolves around Shano and Khalil who have been engaged since childhood but their families' past threatens their love.

Sadqay Tumhare was one of the most popular and acclaimed programs of the year 2014–15. At the annual Hum Awards, it won 10 out of 15 nominations while at Lux Style Awards it won 2 awards out of five including Best Actress for Khan and Best Writer for Qamar.

== Plot ==
Set in 1980s Pakistani society and based on the writer’s real-life story, Sadqay Tumhare follows Shano and Khalil, cousins whose engagement was arranged at birth by their families. Shano, a simple village girl, is deeply devoted to the engagement, while Khalil, an arrogant city boy raised as the “Prince of Punjab,” initially dismisses her feelings. After years of separation, Shano’s yearning to meet Khalil grows. Although Khalil is indifferent, a dream prompts him to visit her. At their first meeting in over a decade, they fall in love, but Shano’s parents oppose their union, preferring her marriage to her paternal cousin Fayaz.

Khalil’s family proposes formally, but Shano’s parents reject it. Amid escalating tensions, Fayaz and his accomplices brutally beat Khalil, but Khalil retaliates. Despite their love, Shano and Khalil face continuous interference, including Rasheeda, Shano’s manipulative mother, who emotionally blackmails Khalil into renouncing Shano. Plans to marry in court fail as Shano’s mother fakes a suicide attempt, halting their union. Shano’s best friend Humaira later reveals that Rasheeda orchestrated Shano’s earlier escape to damage her reputation. Khalil is accused of kidnapping, but Shano testifies in court to clear his name.

Rasheeda’s confession of her lingering love for Khalil’s father, Abdul Rehman, leads to further turmoil. Amin, Shano’s father, suffers a stroke upon learning this. Humaira, secretly in love with Khalil, convinces Shano to give up Khalil to save her father’s health, which improves after Shano’s sacrifice. The tragic backstory of Khalil’s illegitimacy is revealed—his mother, Inayat, was pregnant with another man’s child when she married Abdul Rehman, further complicating the families’ relationship. Inayat’s death shortly after worsens the heartbreak.

Shano and Khalil are forced into separate marriages. Years later, in 1994, Khalil, now a successful banker, learns of Shano’s death, attributed to depression over their separation. At her funeral, Khalil forgives her husband and estranged family members, though he remains angry with Rasheeda. Shano’s sister introduces Khalil to her son, named Khurram, a tribute to their unrealized love. As Khalil leaves, he sees Shano’s spirit watching over him, symbolizing their enduring but tragic connection.

== Cast and characters ==
- Samiya Mumtaz as Rasheeda Amin - Shano's mother. She is the main person who opposes marrying Shano and Khalil, although she is the one who initially promised it. Over time, we see that Shano's mother has quite a few secrets she hides. Her character is displayed as being very quick tempered and aggressive to Shano, often hitting and yelling at her daughter. She is very abusive, and only engaged Shano and Khalil for revenge. She always lures towards Abdul Rehman.
- Mahira Khan as Rukhsana Amin a.k.a. Shano - Eighteen-year-old girl from the village of Balgan. She is the daughter of Rasheeda & Amin. Also, eldest sister of Raziya, Kauser, Haider and Maimoona. Shano wishes to marry her childhood fiancé; Khalil. However, her parents insist she never see him again. Shano is at first quiet and dreamy, but becomes stronger and braver.
- Adnan Malik as Khalil-ur-Rehman Qamar - Khalil is a highly educated and outspoken young man from Lahore. He is portrayed as an angry young man having a tough and pampered personality. Although on the outside Khalil behaves in a macho manner, on the inside he is very caring and good-hearted.
- Rehan Sheikh as Mohammad Amin Janjua- Shano's father. He is seen as clueless and unintelligent, as his wife is more clever than him and controls him.
- Tahira Imam as Inaayat Bibi - Khalil's mother and Rasheeda's older sister. Inaayat is a kind and mature woman. Inaayat loves her son Khalil and is very kind to Shano, but her relationship with her sister is damaged after Rasheeda's mistreatment of Khalil.
- Farhan Ali Agha as Abdul Rehman Qamar- Khalil's stepfather. He is a very understanding and decent man. He wants the best for his family and always treats Shano kindly. He supports Shano and Khalil's attempt to marry.
- Shamil Khan as Doctor Maqsood Ahmed Mughal- Shano & Khalil's cousin who is six years older than him. He is a medical student living with Khalil's family. He is good friends with Khalil. Maqsood acts as Khalil's voice of reason.
- Saniya Shamshad as Humaira Batool - Shano's best friend and classmate. She is a very good friend to Shano and they discuss everything. Humaira only wants to see Shano's happiness and she tries to help Shano and Khalil. However, we later learn that everything is definitely not what it seems. This is because Humaira later creates problems between Shano and Khalil as she falls in love with Khalil and wants to marry him. Shano is shocked when she gets to know the truth.
- Mukarram Kaleem as Fayaz - Mukarram plays his role as Shano's paternal cousin. It is seen that he is interested in marrying Shano from the very beginning. After learning of Khalil he acts as a rebel in the relationship of the two, but eventually doesn't succeed and gives up on Shano.
- Imran Ashraf as Mushtaq - Humaira's cousin. He wants to marry Shano and plans against her and Khalil.
- Naghma as Bee Ji - Rasheeda and Inayat's mother. She loves Khalil and Shano very much and supports them at every turn.
- Qavi Khan as Maulvi Sanaullah
- Sara Razi as Raziya - Shano's sister
- Arisha Razi as Kauser - Shanno's younger sister
- Irfan Khoosat as Chacha Mir, Tangay wala
- Haris Waheed as Imtiaz - Fayaz's elder brother
- Saife Hassan as Mustaq's father
- Birjees Farooqui as Samina
- Anoushey Ashraf as Journalist (cameo appearance)
- Kaif Ghaznavi as Ruby Naz (Khalil's wife) (cameo appearance)

== Production ==
Writer of the serial, Khalil-Ur-Rehman Qamar said that the serial is based on a true story, his own life, "There is no scene that has been added for the sake of the drama"

The serial was shot in many locations including rural areas of Interior Punjab. Other locations include Sialkot, Sambrial, Kotri and Karachi.

== Broadcast and release ==
Besides the serial's airing on TV, it was also uploaded on YouTube. All the episode were available on YouTube which were later removed in 2017. Netflix launched Pakistani dramas in 2016 and the series rights was acquired by Netflix to stream it as VOD.

The series broadcast in India on Zindagi.

== Awards and nominations ==
Year	Award	Date	Category	Recipient(s)	Result	Ref.
2015	Lux Style Awards	September 30, 2015	Best Original Soundtrack	Momina Duraid	Nominated	
2015	Hum Awards	April 9, 2016; 23 May 2016 & 24 May 2016 (televised)	Best Drama Serial	Momina Duraid; Samina Humayun Saeed; Tariq Ahmed Shah	Nominated	
2015	Hum Awards	April 9, 2016; 23 May 2016 & 24 May 2016 (televised)	Best Director Drama Serial	Ehteshamuddin	Won	
2015	Hum Awards	April 9, 2016; 23 May 2016 & 24 May 2016 (televised)	Best Actor Jury	Adnan Malik	Nominated	
2015	Hum Awards	April 9, 2016; 23 May 2016 & 24 May 2016 (televised)	Best Actress Jury	Mahira Khan	Nominated	
2015	Hum Awards	April 9, 2016; 23 May 2016 & 24 May 2016 (televised)	Best Supporting Actor	Rehan Sheikh	Won	
2015	Hum Awards	April 9, 2016; 23 May 2016 & 24 May 2016 (televised)	Best Supporting Actress	Saniya Shamshad	Nominated	
2015	Hum Awards	April 9, 2016; 23 May 2016 & 24 May 2016 (televised)	Best Writer Drama Serial	Khalil-ur-Rehman	Won	
2015	Hum Awards	April 9, 2016; 23 May 2016 & 24 May 2016 (televised)	Best Television Sensation Male	Adnan Malik	Won	
2015	Hum Awards	April 9, 2016; 23 May 2016 & 24 May 2016 (televised)	Best Negative Actor	Samiya Mumtaz	Won	
2015	Hum Awards	April 9, 2016; 23 May 2016 & 24 May 2016 (televised)	Most Impactful Character	Samiya Mumtaz	Won	
2015	Hum Awards	April 9, 2016; 23 May 2016 & 24 May 2016 (televised)	Best Onscreen Couple	Mahira Khan; Adnan Malik	Won	
2015	Hum Awards	April 9, 2016; 23 May 2016 & 24 May 2016 (televised)	Best Original Soundtrack	Rahat Fateh Ali Khan	Won	
2015	Hum Awards	April 9, 2016; 23 May 2016 & 24 May 2016 (televised)	Best Drama Serial Popular	Momina Duraid; Samina Humayun Saeed; Tariq Ahmed Shah	Won	
2015	Hum Awards	April 9, 2016; 23 May 2016 & 24 May 2016 (televised)	Best Actor Popular	Adnan Malik	Nominated	
2015	Hum Awards	April 9, 2016; 23 May 2016 & 24 May 2016 (televised)	Best Actress Popular	Mahira Khan	Won	
2016	Lux Style Awards	July 29, 2016; 20 August 2016 (televised)	Best Television Play	Momina Duraid; Samina Humayun Saeed; Tariq Ahmed Shah	Nominated	
2016	Lux Style Awards	July 29, 2016; 20 August 2016 (televised)	Best Television Director	Ehteshamuddin	Nominated	
2016	Lux Style Awards	July 29, 2016; 20 August 2016 (televised)	Best Television Actor	Adnan Malik	Nominated	
2016	Lux Style Awards	July 29, 2016; 20 August 2016 (televised)	Best Television Actress	Mahira Khan	Won	
2016	Lux Style Awards	July 29, 2016; 20 August 2016 (televised)	Best Television Writer	Khalil-ur-Rehman	Won	

== See also ==
- Mera Naam Yousuf Hai starring Imran Abbas and Maya Ali
- Pyarey Afzal starring Hamza Ali Abbasi and Ayeza Khan
- Bunty I Love You starring Saba Qamar and Noman Habib
- Tum Kon Piya starring Imran Abbas and Ayeza Khan
