= Summer Nicks =

- Born: 17 April 1972 (age 54); Byron Bay, Australia
- Occupations: Director, producer, screenwriter
- Years active: 1972–present
- Children: 1
- Relatives: Ajaya Thapa Nicks (son)

Summer Nicks is an Australian television, film and commercial director, best known for writing and directing O21, Shambhala and Sedition as well as writing and producing Seedlings, Damaged and co-producing 3 Holes and a Smoking Gun. He has had a key involvement in the Pakistani film industry, where he lived for eight years.

In 2012–13, Seedlings won "Best Film", "People's Choice Award" at the New York City Film Festival and the South Asian Association for Regional Cooperation Film Festival with his leading lady, Aamina Sheikh winning the "Best Actress Award" twice. The film also won "Best Film" at the DC South Asian Film Festival and the London South Asian Film Festival.

In 2014, he wrote and directed the spy thriller 021. In 2015, his second directorial venture, Shambhala, a mystical action adventure being shot in northern India was put on hold so Jonathan Rhys Meyers could be recast. During that period he wrote and co-directed the action thriller Sedition.

== Filmography ==
Year	Title	Note(s)
2012	Seedlings	Writer//Director/Producer
2013	Main Hoon Shahid Afridi	Actor
2013	O21	Writer/director
2014	Damaged	Writer/producer
2015	3 Holes and a Smoking Gun	Co-producer
2016	Shambhala	Writer/director
2017	Sedition	Writer/director

== Awards ==
Awards
Venue	Recipient	Category	Result
SARCC Film Festival	Summer Nicks, Meher Jaffri	Best Film	Won
SARCC Film Festival	Aamina Sheikh	Best Actress in a Leading Role	Won
People's Choice Award	Summer Nicks, Meher Jaffri	Best Film	Won
New York Film Festival	Aamina Sheikh	Best Performance by an Actress	Won
New York Film Festival	Mansoor Mujahid	Best Director	Nominated
New York Film Festival	Mohib Mirza	Best Actor in a Leading Role	Nominated
New York Film Festival	Gohar Rasheed	Best Actor in a Supporting Role	Nominated
New York Film Festival	Summer Nicks	Best Original Screenplay	Nominated
New York Film Festival	Usman Riaz	Best Original Score	Nominated
New York Film Festival	Summer Nicks, Meher Jaffri	Best Film	Nominated
Vancouver Film Festival	Summer Nicks, Meher Jaffri	Best Film	Nominated
London Asian Film Festival	Summer Nicks, Meher Jaffri	Best Film	Nominated
Washington DC South Asian Film Festival	Summer Nicks, Meher Jaffri	Best Film	Won
Washington DC South Asian Film Festival	Mansoor Mujahid	Best Director	Nominated
Washington DC South Asian Film Festival	Summer Nicks	Best Screenplay	Nominated
