= Mehram =

- Genre: Pakistani drama Telenovela
- Written by: Zafar Mairaj
- Directed by: Siraj ul Haq
- Starring: Ayesha Khan; Zahid Ahmed; Agha Ali; Moammar Rana; Sajida Syed
- Country of origin: Pakistan
- Original language: Urdu
- No. of seasons: 1
- No. of episodes: 25

Production
- Producer: Moomal Shunaid
- Production locations: Karachi, Sindh, Pakistan
- Production company: Moomal Productions

Original release
- Network: Hum TV
- Release: 29 November 2014 – 5 March 2015

Mehram is a Pakistani television series that aired on Hum TV from 29 November 2014 to 5 March 2015. The 25-episode series stars Ayesha Khan and Zahid Ahmed in leading roles, along with Agha Ali and Moammar Rana in supporting roles. The serial was a critical and commercial success and earned several nominations, with Ayesha Khan being nominated for the Hum Award for Best Actress Popular and the Hum Award for Best Actress, and Zahid Ahmed was for the Hum Award for Best Television Sensation Male.

== Synopsis ==
Mehram is the story of an unobtrusive family where Hamza is living with his brother's dowager, Iqra, subsequently becoming the brunt of doubts. Hamza has ample respect for Iqra, yet they covertly tie knots to hush all the idle discussions. Not long after their paper marriage, Iqra understands that Hamza needs somebody he adores and demands that he marry Maya, for whom Hamza has sentiments. The story takes a turn as Maya and Hamza marry, and Maya finds out about his paper marriage to Iqra. Maya leave the house, saying she can't live in the same house as his first wife, and he has to choose between her and Iqra. Seeing the tension between the newlywed couple, Iqra also left the house. Hamza became mentally disturbed and tried to shoot himself, after which both started to look after him until he recovered. After recovering, Maya asked him to choose between her and Iqra. Iqra leaves the house again and starts living with his father. Meanwhile, at the request of Iqra, Hamza decides to divorce her. But later that day, Iqra's father dies. Hamza decides not to divorce her and bring her back but when he came to Iqra's house, he found that she had already left. After some years, Hamza and Maya have a daughter. And Iqra starts to publish her poetry to earn a living.

== Cast ==
- Ayesha Khan as Iqra
- Zahid Ahmed as Hamza
- Moammar Rana as Zubair
- Shazia Naz as Maya
- Agha Ali as Areeb
- Sajida Syed as Romana
- Hina Rizvi as Habiba
- Ayesha Khan as Faiza
- Erum Azam as Iqra's sister
