= Mein Hari Piya =

- Genre: Romantic; Drama
- Written by: Jahanzaib Qamar
- Directed by: Asad Mumtaz Malik
- Starring: Soniya Hussain; Agha Ali; Zeba Ali; Syed Jibran; Farah Nadeem; Anum Fayyaz; Fazila Qazi; Munawar Saeed
- Opening theme: Mein Hari Piya performed by Sara Raza Khan
- Composer: Sahir Ali Bagga
- Country of origin: Pakistan
- Original language: Urdu
- No. of episodes: 70

Production
- Producer: MNM Enterprises
- Production location: Karachi

Original release
- Network: Hum TV
- Release: 4 February – 13 May 2013

Mein Hari Piya (Urdu: میں ہاری پیا, lit. 'I lost, my beloved') is a Pakistani Urdu language soap opera, which aired on Hum TV. It stars Soniya Hussain and Agha Ali in lead. The theme music was sung by Sara Raza Khan. It was also aired in India on Zee Zindagi.

At the annual Hum Awards in 2014, it was nominated for Best Soap Actor and Best Soap Actress.

== Cast ==
- Agha Ali as Zawar
- Soniya Hussain as Parisa
- Hamza Sohail as Saud
- Zeba Ali
- Syed Jibran
- Munawar Saeed
- Ayesha Toor
- Anum Fayyaz
- Fazila Qazi
- Mohsin Gilani
- Yasir Shooro
- Farah Nadeem
- Faisal Jameel
- Javeria
