= Churails =

Pakistani drama web series

- Official Poster
- Genre: Drama; Thriller
- Written by: Asim Abbasi
- Directed by: Asim Abbasi
- Starring: Sarwat Gilani; Mehar Bano; Nimra Bucha; Yasra Rizvi
- Composer: Taha Malik
- Country of origin: Pakistan
- Original languages: Urdu; English
- No. of seasons: 1
- No. of episodes: 10

Production
- Executive producers: Mo Azmi; Shailja Kejriwal
- Producer: Asim Abbasi
- Editors: Kamal Khan; Kamran Shahnawaz
- Camera setup: Multi-camera
- Running time: Approx. 60 minutes
- Production company: A Glasshouse Production

Original release
- Network: Zindagi
- Release: 11 August 2020

Churails (transl. Witches / Demons [female] / Banshees) is a 2020 Pakistani drama web series released through the Indian platforms ZEE5 and Zindagi. It is written and directed by Asim Abbasi. The web series stars Sarwat Gilani, Mehar Bano, Nimra Bucha, and Yasra Rizvi in lead roles. It is produced by Asim Abbasi along with Mo Azmi and Shailja Kejriwal. It revolves around Karachi's secret detectives, whose mission is to expose the city's unfaithful, elite husbands. It was available for streaming on the OTT platform ZEE5 from 11 August 2020 to mid 2025, after which it was made available on Begin to stream.

== Premise ==
The series focuses on the lives of four women: Sara (Sarwat Gilani), a lawyer who gave up her career to be the "perfect wife," Jugnu (Yasra Rizvi), a wedding planner, Zubaida (Mehar Bano), a boxer seeking independence and love, and Batool (Nimra Bucha), an ex-convict who was sentenced to twenty years in prison for murder. Their lives become intertwined when Sara discovers her husband cheating on her, after which the four decide to set up a detective agency to catch cheating husbands in action. They run this agency covertly under the guise of a retail burka store called "Halal Designs" and call themselves Churails. When one of them goes missing, their investigation leads them to something much bigger than themselves, dominated by Karachi's most powerful.

== Cast ==
=== Main ===
- Sarwat Gilani as Sara Khan
- Mehar Bano as Zubaida
- Nimra Bucha as Batool Jan
- Yasra Rizvi as Jugnu Chaudhry

=== Supporting ===
- Meher Jaffri as Laila
- Omair Rana as Jamil Khan
- Sarmed Aftab Jadraan as Dilbar
- Kashif Hussain as Shams
- Dimeji Ewuoso as Jackson
- Shabana Hassan as Resham
- Mareeha Safdar as Sheila
- Amtul Baweja as Munni
- Zara Khan as Baby Doll
- Bakhtawar Mazhar as Pinky
- Sameena Nazir as Babli
- Adnan Malik as Khawar Kureishi "KK"
- Hina Khawaja Bayat as Sherry
- Tara Mahmood as Shumaila
- Maha Hasan as Rida
- Fawad Khan as Inspector Jamshed
- Alycia Dias as Jiya

=== Guest ===
- Farah Nadir as Razia (Episode 1–2)
- Akbar Islam as Ishtiaq (Episode 1–2)
- Sami Khan (Episode 1–2)
- Faiza Gillani as Bilquis (Episode 2, 9)
- Adnan Jillani as Abdul Majeed (Episode 2)
- Nadia Afgan as Aasia (Episode 3)
- Adnan Shah Tipu as Sheila's father (Episode 3)
- Emaan Khan as Young Batool (Episode 3, 4)
- Sania Saeed as Shehnaz Khalid (Episode 4, 5)
- Sarmad Sultan Khoosat as Ehtisham Khalid (Episode 4)
- Hamzah Tariq Jamil as Naeem (Episode 4)
- Daniyal Raheal as Ro (Episode 5)
- Adnan 'Reddy' Saeed as Ho (Episode 5)
- Frieha Altaf as Botox Lady (Episode 6)
- Fahad Mirza as Shahnawaz (Episode 6)
- Shamim Hilaly as Jehanara (Episode 7, 10)
- Laila Zuberi as Tabinda Rafi (Episode 7)
- Anoushay Abbasi as Saima (Episode 7)
- Faris Shafi as Abdullah (Episode 8)
- Mahira Khan as Shagufta (Episode 9)
- Eman Suleman as Mehak Hussain (Episode 9, 10)
- Syed Mohammad Ahmed as Iftikhar's lawyer (Episode 10)
- Khalid Ahmed as Iftikhar Chaudhary (Jugnu’s uncle)

== Episodes ==
Season	Episodes	Originally released
1	10	August 11, 2020

=== Season 1 ===
No.	Title	Directed by	Written by	Original release date
1	"The Unusual Team/Wafa"	Asim Abbasi	Asim Abbasi	11 August 2020
2	"The Fight For A Cause/Aika"	Asim Abbasi	Asim Abbasi	11 August 2020
3	"A Gruesome Crime/Ghulami"	Asim Abbasi	Asim Abbasi	11 August 2020
4	"Batool's Blast From The Past/Izzat"	Asim Abbasi	Asim Abbasi	11 August 2020
5	"The Churails in Danger/Hudood"	Asim Abbasi	Asim Abbasi	11 August 2020
6	"The Much-Needed Reunion/Husn"	Asim Abbasi	Asim Abbasi	11 August 2020
7	"Zubaida Goes Undercover/Qurbani"	Asim Abbasi	Asim Abbasi	11 August 2020
8	"The Deadly Secret/Tabedaari"	Asim Abbasi	Asim Abbasi	11 August 2020
9	"Zubaida's Rescue Mission/Qaaboo"	Asim Abbasi	Asim Abbasi	11 August 2020
10	"The Animal Club/Taaqat"	Asim Abbasi	Asim Abbasi	11 August 2020

== Production ==
=== Development ===
The web series was announced in the first quarter of 2019 to be directed by Asim Abbasi.

=== Filming ===
Principal photography commenced with the lead actors Sarwat Gilani, Mehar Bano, Nimra Bucha, Yasra Rizvi and they had been spotted shooting in summer 2019.

Director Asim Abbasi announced the wrap up of Churails in an Instagram post on 4 September 2019.

== Marketing and release ==
=== Promotion ===
The official trailer of the web series was launched on 31 July 2020 by ZEE5 on YouTube.

=== Release ===
Churails was released on ZEE5, an Indian streaming platform available to audiences across the world. The series started streaming from 11 August 2020. Amid the 2025 India-Pakistan conflict, all the Indian platforms were ordered to remove all Pakistani shows, after which the series was removed from ZEE5 and was made available on Begin.

== Reception ==
BBC Urdu documentary about the series.

The series has been praised for its sensitive and nuanced depictions of LGBTQ characters, with gay men, lesbian women and transgender characters. Abbasi said, "Because we are showing such a diverse range of women, it was important to show the entire spectrum of sexuality. It would have been wrong if they were all straight because not all women in Pakistan are straight."

Shaheera Anwar at The Express Tribune gave the series 4.5/5 stars, writing, "Without compromising on the storytelling, Churails is a feminist masterpiece."

Shubhra Gupta at The Indian Express wrote, "To watch free-spirited, cussing-out-loud, hockey-sticks and rifle-toting, burqa-clad women beating the bejesus out of violent, murderous men, is one of the high points of Churails".

=== Streaming removal and reinstatement ===
In October 2020, the series was briefly removed from streaming on ZEE5 without explanation, reportedly in response to complaints from the Pakistan Electronic Media Regulatory Authority (PEMRA) and Pakistan Telecommunication Authority (PTA). However, the series returned to the streaming platform within a day or two. ZEE5 released a statement regarding the removal and reinstatement: "The show was taken off the platform in Pakistan purely in compliance with a directive that we received. We have now addressed the matter and reinstated the show on our platform."
