= Azaadi =

2018 Pakistani film

- film poster
- آزادی
- Directed by: Imran Malik
- Written by: Imran Malik
- Screenplay by: Wajid Zuberi
- Produced by: Irfan Malik; Imran Malik
- Starring: Moammar Rana; Sonya Hussain; Nadeem Baig
- Cinematography: Benjamin Jasper
- Edited by: M. Arif
- Music by: Sahir Ali Bagga
- Production company: Pervez Malik Films
- Distributed by: ARY Films
- Release date: 16 June 2018 (Eid al-Fitr)
- Running time: 152 min
- Country: Pakistan
- Language: Urdu
- Budget: Rs. 70 million (US$250,000)
- Box office: Rs. 84 million (US$300,000)

Azaadi (Urdu: آزادی; transl. Freedom) is a 2018 Pakistani action thriller war film, that was released on 16 June 2018. It is written, directed and co-produced by Imran Malik with his brother Irfan Malik under the banner of Pervez Malik Films. Based on the Kashmir conflict and the insurgency in Jammu and Kashmir, the film stars Moammar Rana, Sonya Hussain and Nadeem Baig in the leading roles. Dialogues for the film are written by Wajid Zuberi, and the film has been distributed by ARY Films.

== Cast ==
- Moammar Rana as Azaad, a character based on the Kashmiri militant Burhan Wani
- Mariyam Khalif
- Sonya Hussain as Zara; a Pakistani-origin British journalist, Azaad's wife
- Nadeem Baig as Azaad's father
- Mariam Ansari
- Ali Bilal
- Erum Azam as Sheena
- Ali Fateh
- Samama Randhawa
- Waseem
- Zeeshan Khan
- Saddam ul Haque as Major Sunil
- Omer Shahzad as Raj (cameo)

== Production ==
=== Casting ===
Danish Taimoor was originally cast opposite lead female Sonya Hussain, as the lead male character of the film. But due to the fallout with the makers of the film he was later replaced by Moammar. Pakistani television actress Sonya Hussain, plays the lead female role of a Pakistani-origin British journalist. Veteran Pakistani actor Nadeem Baig will essay the father figure role in the film who devotes his life to the Kashmir struggle and passes on his vision of struggle to the youth.

=== Development ===
In an interview with DAWN Images, director Imran highlighted that a film of such a big canvas has never been attempted before in Pakistan, and that the film had elements of patriotism, action scenes and a very powerful love story. The cinematography has been done by Ben Jasper.

=== Filming ===
The film has been shot in Azad Kashmir and Northern Areas of Pakistan.

== Music ==
The music of the film has been done by Sahir Ali Bagga, Jabar Abbas, Shafqat Amanat Ali Khan and Afshan Fawad. Singers Rahat Fateh Ali Khan and Qurat-ul-Ain Balouch have also lent their voices for the soundtrack. Natasha Khan from Coke Studio was the audio engineer of the movie.

No.	Title	Music	Singer(s)	Length
1.	"Mahiya Ve"	Bobby Wazir	Afshan Fawad, Jabar Abbas
2.	"Lagiyaan"	Sahir Ali Bagga	Sahir Ali Bagga

== Release ==
The Film was released on Eid-ul-Fitr in Pakistan.

== Reception ==
=== Box office ===
The film collected 64 million in its first week despite having tough competition from Bollywood movie Race 3 and three other Pakistani films including 7 Din Mohabbat In, Wajood and Na Band Na Baraati.

=== Critical reception ===
Omair Alavi of Samaa TV praised the film for its worthy cause, excellent cinematography, and powerful performances from Nadeem Baig and Moammar Rana, but the film's weak action sequences, special effects, lengthy first half, which damaged the overall impact of the film, inaccurate portrayal of Kashmiri culture and some unrealistic elements in the storyline were critiqued.

== See also ==
- List of Pakistani films of 2018
