= Band Khirkiyan =

Pakistani television series

- Written by: Seema Munaf
- Screenplay by: Shahzad Javed
- Directed by: Asad Jabbal
- Starring: Agha Ali; Sarah Khan; Anum Fayyaz
- Theme music composer: Joshu Keith Benjamin
- Opening theme: "Band Khirkiyan"; Singer(s); Ahmed Jahanzeb; Lyrics by Ali Moeen
- Country of origin: Pakistan
- Original language: Urdu
- No. of episodes: 30

Production
- Producer: Moomal Shunaid
- Camera setup: Multi-camera setup
- Production company: Moomal Entertainment

Original release
- Network: Hum TV
- Release: 20 July 2018 – 22 February 2019

Band Khirkiyan (Urdu: بند کھڑکیاں, transl. Closed windows) is a Pakistani Urdu-language romantic drama series, written by Seema Munad, developed by Shahzad Javed, produced by Moomal Shunaid under her banner Moomal Entertainment with Rafay Rashdi as managing partner. The drama aired a weekly episode on Hum TV every Friday and replaced Parchayee. It stars Sarah Khan and Agha Ali.

== Plot ==
Subuhi accepts the proposal of her cousin Zain, an extremely loving but arrogant and possessive man. Their love vanishes with jealousy, doubts and suffocation, which overpowers their relationship.

== Cast ==
- Agha Ali as Zain
- Sarah Khan as Saboohi
- Anum Fayyaz as Middat
- Agha Mustafa Hassan as Mohid
- Seemi Pasha as Zain's Mother
- Mariam Mirza as Mohid's Mother
- Sajid Shah as Zain's Father
- Akbar Islam as Saboohi's Father
- Raeed Muhammad Alam as Sameer

== Soundtrack ==
The title song of Band Khirkiyan was composed by Joshu Keith Benjamin, lyrics for the song were given by Ali Moeen. The OST was performed by Ahmed Jahanzeb who previously sang De Ijazat OST for Hum TV. The first soundtrack is released on 12 July 2018. The soundtrack was produced along with series production by Moomal Entertainment.

Band Khirkiyan - OST

Soundtrack album by Ahmed Jahanzeb
- Released: 12 July 2018
- Recorded: 2018
- Genre: Television soundtrack
- Length: (3:16)
- Language: Urdu
- Label: Hum TV

Music video
- "Band Khirkiyan" OST on YouTube

All lyrics are written by Ali Moeen; all music is composed by Joshu Keith Benjamin.

Track listing
No.	Title	Artist(s)	Length
1.	"Band Khirkiyan"	Ahmed Jahanzeb	3:16
