= Zahid Ahmed (actor) =

Pakistani television actor and former radio jockey

Zahid Ahmed PP
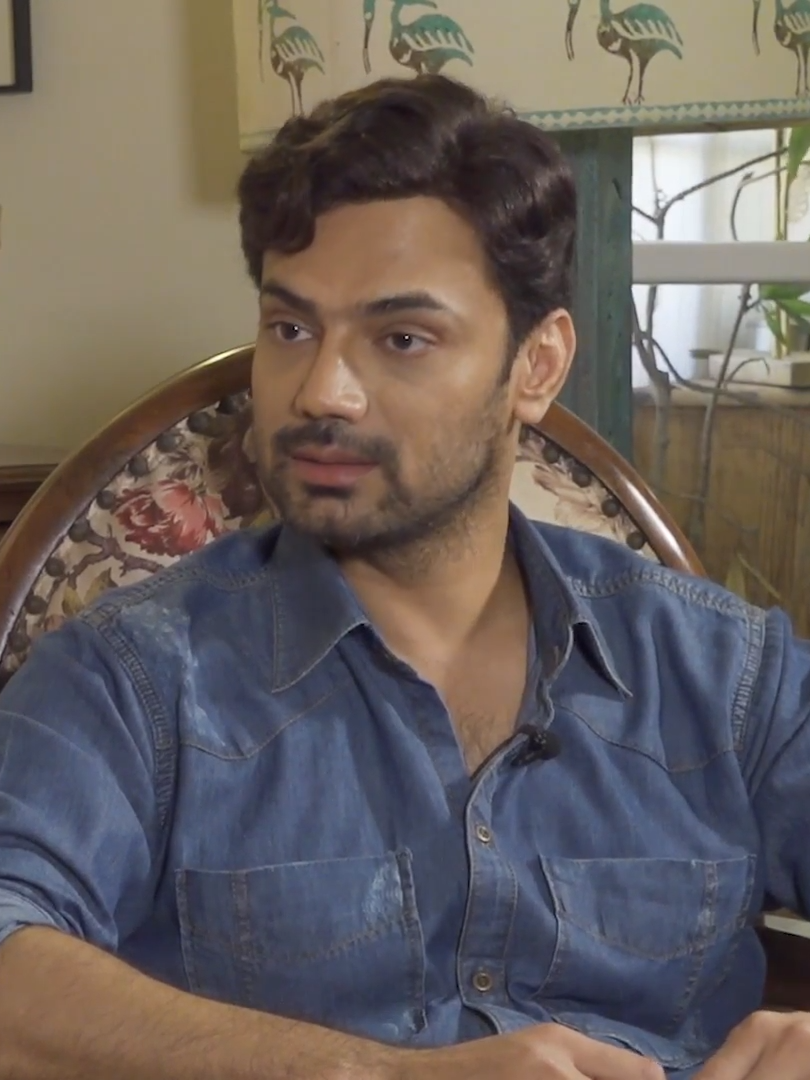
- Zahid in 2024
- Born: Zahid Iftikhar Ahmed; Rawalpindi, Punjab, Pakistan
- Education: Preston University
- Occupations: Actor, radio jockey
- Years active: 2006–present
- Height: 183 cm (6 ft 0 in)
- Spouse: Amna Zahid
- Children: 2

Zahid Iftikhar Ahmed is a Pakistani television actor and former radio jockey. Ahmed worked as a creative manager for PTV World, and later became a radio jockey. He later left it to pursue a career in acting, and made his Broadway debut with a leading role in the play It Runs in the Family (2006). He also portrayed Muhammad Ali Jinnah in Anwar Maqsood's Sawa 14 August and its sequel Pawnay 14 August (both 2014). That same year, he made his television debut with the romantic series Mehram.

== Early life and education ==
Zahid received his early education in Rawalpindi and graduated from Preston University in marketing. From 2003 to 2011, Zahid worked as a COO facilitator (corporate trainer) for sales and customer service operations in an IT company, however he left the job when the company was discovered to be fraudulent and joined Pakistan Television Network's flagship channel PTV Home and later as a creative manager to launch an PTV World, where he met Anwar Maqsood and accepted the offer to play Muhammad Ali Jinnah in Maqsood's one-act play Sawa 14 August.

== Career ==
Ahmed started his career as a radio jockey where he hosted Pakistani version of Australian morning shows The Breakfast Show and The Rush Hour for a year from 2002 to 2003, but left the show due to his job at call center in ISB. Due to his experience at radio, Zahid is a professional voice-over artist and has worked on various commercials for BBC, Nokia and is an official member of Voices.com. He also plays a small role in unreleased film Cedare a joint production of Canada and Pakistan.

In 2006, Ahmed made his stage debut in a Pakistani adaptations of Ray Cooney's comedy play, It runs in the family where he portray Dr. David, and in 2007's musical, Bombay Dreams as Vikram. His performances in these plays earned him critical appraisal and in 2008, he went on to play Raoul de Chagny in universally acclaimed musical, Phantom of the Opera and John Smith in Cooney's magnum-opus, Run For Your Wife in 2011, while he continued to work as a trainer. However, his claim to fame came later when he accept the role of Muhammad Ali Jinnah in Anwar Maqsood's hit political-drama play, Sawa 14 August in 2013. Losing 48-pounds for the role he successfully plays the role in over 200 shows performed in Karachi, Lahore and Islamabad. He then quit his job at PTV to become a full-time actor and played Butt Sahab - a fat, bald blundering buffoon in another Maqsood's comedy-play Half Plate and reprise his role as Jinnah in Sawa 14 August's prequel Pawnay 14 August.

Ahmed made a television debut with series Mehram alongside Ayesha Khan, that earned him widespread acclaim and recognition. Sultana Siddiqui offered him the role after watching him at theater. He went on to star in hit drama serial Alvida alongside Imran Abbas Naqvi and Sanam Jung, where he portrayed the character Rameez a mentally disturbed husband of Jung, describing his character Ahmed said, "Rameez's passion for Haya is similar to Zahid's passion for acting." He established himself as a lead actor with these roles and appeared in four drama series in 2015 for Hum TV including Jugnoo, Tum Mere Paas Raho, Sangat (where he played the role of a rapist), and Zara Yaad Kar. For his debut work he was among the Best Television Sensation Male at 3rd Hum Awards but due to awards rules only winners received nomination and award, which he lost to Adnan Malik. He received three nominations at 4th Hum Awards including Best actor in a Supporting Role for Alvida, Best Actor in a Negative Role for Alvida and Sangat.

In 2016, he played Haider Bakht in ARY Digital's drama series Besharam. His performance received critical acclaim. He was cast in Geo Entertainment high-budget fantasy period drama series, Mor Mahal directed by Sarmad Sultan Khoosat where he portrayed the role of Kabeer.

In 2026, Ahmed was awarded with the Pride of Performance by President Zardari

== Filmography ==
=== Television ===
Year	Title	Role(s)	Channel	Notes
2014	Mehram	Hamza	Hum TV	Television debut
2015	Alvidaa	Rameez	Hum TV	
2015	Jugnoo	Zulfi	Hum TV	
2015	Tum Mere Paas Raho	Tabish	Hum TV	
2015	Sangat	Shavez	Hum TV	
2016	Zara Yaad Kar	Hadi	Hum TV	
2016	Kitni Girhain Baaki Hain (Season 2)	Hassaam	Hum TV	
2016	Mor Mahal	Kabir	Geo Entertainment	
2016	Besharam	Haidar	ARY Digital	
2016	Naimat	Babar	ARY Digital	
2016	Mera Kya Qasoor Tha	Rohail	Geo Entertainment	
2017	Dil e Jaanam	Shavez	Hum TV	
2017	Pujaran	Aabis	TV One	
2017	Tau Dil Ka Kia Hua	Saif	Hum TV	
2017	Gustakh Ishq	Sikandar	Urdu1	
2017	Daldal	Shuja	Hum TV	
2018	Pukaar	Sarang	ARY Digital	
2018	Visaal	Akram “Akku”	ARY Digital	
2018	Dil Diyan Gallan	Hassan	Hum TV	Telefilm
2019	Choti Choti Batain	Fahad	Hum TV	Anthology series
2019	Ishq Zahe Naseeb	Sameer	Hum TV	
2019	Mein Na Janoo	Zulqarnain "Nain"	Hum TV	
2020	Mohabbat Tujhe Alvida	Shahaan	Hum TV	
2020	Faryaad	Muraad	ARY Digital	
2021	Hangor S-131	Cdr Ahmad Tasnim	ARY Digital	Telefilm
2022	Mor Moharan	Ahmed Khan Ghardezi	TV One	
2022	Dil Phisla Rey	Razi	Geo TV	Telefilm
2023	Mere Ban Jao	Zaki	Hum TV	
2023	101 Talaqain	Rustam Kavasji	Green Entertainment	
2024	Jaan Se Pyara Juni	Junaid "Juni"	Hum TV	
2024	Gentleman	ACP Faris Ahmed	Green Entertainment	
2025	Humraaz	Ahmer	Geo Entertainment	
2025	Dil Dhoondta Hai Phir Wohi	Ali	Express Entertainment	
2026	Mirza Ki Heer	Z.A. Dilnawaz	ARY Digital	Negative role
2026	Rutba	Meer	ARY Digital	

=== Films ===
Year	Title	Role(s)	Notes
2018	Altered Skin	Riaz	
2022	Ghabrana Nahi Hai	Sikandar	
TBA	Jhol		
2022	Sorry: A Love Story	—	Discontinued

=== Stage ===
Year	Production	Role
2006	It Runs in the Family	Dr. David
2007	Bombay Dreams	Vikram
2008	Home is where your Clothes Are	Ronnie
2009	Phantom of the Opera	Raoul de Chagny
2011	Run for Your Wife	John Smith
2013	Sawa 14 August	Muhammad Ali Jinnah
2013	Half Plate	Butt Sahab
2014	Pawnay 14 August	Muhammad Ali Jinnah

=== Radio shows ===
Year	Show	Station	Role
2002-03	The Breakfast Show	City FM 89	Host, radio jockey
2002-03	The Rush Hour	City FM 89	Host, radio jockey
2011	The Bumper2Bumper Gaming Show	Drive FM 89.9	Host, radio jockey

== Awards and nominations ==
Year	Awards	Category	Nominated work	Result	Ref(s)
2016	4th Hum Awards	Best actor in a Supporting Role	Alvida	Nominated	
2016	4th Hum Awards	Best Actor in a Negative Role	Alvida	Won	
2016	4th Hum Awards	Best Actor in a Negative Role	Sangat	Nominated	
2017	16th Lux Style Awards	Best Television Actor	Besharam	Nominated	
2017	ARY Viewers Choice Awards	Best Couple with Saba Qamar	Besharam	Nominated	
2017	ARY Viewers Choice Awards	Best Actor	Besharam	Nominated	
2018	6th Hum Awards	Best Actor	Daldal	Nominated	
2020	19th Lux Style Awards	Best TV Actor - Critic's choice	Ishq Zahe Naseeb	Won	
