= Pari (2018 Pakistani film) =

- Directed by: Syed Atif Ali
- Written by: Muhammad Ahsan; Syed Atif Ali
- Produced by: Syed Atif Ali; Mubeen Mahmood
- Starring: Qavi Khan Rasheed Naz Saleem Mairaj; Khushi Maheen
- Music by: Masood Alam
- Production companies: MIG Media Company; Screenshots Productions
- Release date: 2 February 2018
- Country: Pakistan
- Language: Urdu
- Budget: 2.3crore PKR
- Box office: 5crore PKR

Pari (Urdu: پری, lit. 'Fairy') is a 2018 Pakistani horror film directed by Syed Atif Ali, who also co-wrote the script with Muhammad Ahsan. The film features Pakistani television actors Qavi Khan, Rasheed Naz and Saleem Mairaj.

The film was originally scheduled to be released on 31 October 2017; however, it was released after a delay on 2 February 2018.

== Cast ==
- Qavi Khan
- Khushi Maheen
- Rasheed Naz
- Saleem Mairaj
- Azekah Daniel
- Junaid Akhtar
- Faiq Asim

== Production ==
The movie was shot on location at Ayubia National Park. The house where the movie was shot is said to be haunted.

== Reception ==
Rahul Aijaz of The Express Tribune rated 0 stars and said, "The film, in all honesty, is a new low for Pakistani cinema." HIP in Pakistan gave the film a more favourable review and a rating of 7/10, saying "It was a very good attempt by Pakistanis to make a horror movie".

== See also ==
- List of Pakistani films of 2018
