= Mor Moharan =

Pakistani television series

- Written by: Ali Moeen
- Directed by: Owais Khan
- Starring: Sonya Hussyn; Zahid Ahmed
- Theme music composer: Naveed Nashad; Wajid Saeed
- Country of origin: Pakistan
- Original language: Urdu
- No. of episodes: 33

Production
- Executive producer: Seema Taher Khan
- Producer: Babar Qayyum
- Production location: Bahawalpur, Punjab
- Cinematography: Zulfiqar Ali
- Camera setup: Multi-camera setup

Original release
- Release: 10 May 2022 – 3 January 2023

Mor Moharan is a Pakistani television series premiered on TV One on 10 May 2022. It is directed by Owais Khan and written by Ali Moeen. It stars Sonya Hussyn and Zahid Ahmed, with supporting cast including Mustafa Changazi, Samiya Mumtaz, Adnan Jaffar, Babar Ali and Firdous Jamal. The series aired simultaneously on PTV Home.

== Synopsis ==
Rohi (Sonya Hussyn) is featured as a graduate of environmental science from Punjab University who comes to her ancestral land. She observes that the women in her area must travel long distances to fetch water. She decides to help them and asks for assistance from her father, a respectable and well-known man of the region. She uses her education and her father's position to solve this problem.

== Cast ==
- Sonya Hussyn as Rohi
- Zahid Ahmed as Gurdezi
- Mustafa Changazi as Sikandar
- Samiya Mumtaz as Almas
- Baber Ali as Sher Aalam
- Adnan Jaffar as Nawab Feroze
- Firdous Jamal as Malook Shah
- Salma Asim as Heer

== Production ==
Principal photography began on 4 February 2021 in Cholistan, Bahawalpur.

Mor Moharan is the third collaboration of Hussyn with Ahmed after Ishq Zahe Naseeb (2019) and Mohabbat Tujhe Alvida (2020) and marked her second collaboration with Khan after Marasim (2014).

The initial teasers were released on 28 October 2021. It was slated to air in December 2021; however, its release got postponed and later premiered in May 2022.
