= Masoom (Pakistani TV series) =

Pakistani television series

- Written by: Content Line
- Directed by: Barkat Siddiqui
- Starring: Imran Ashraf; Sonya Hussyn; Mikaal Zulfiqar; Sidra Niazi; Waseem Abbas; Naveen Naqvi; Shaista Jabeen; Abu Hurairah
- Country of origin: Pakistan
- Original language: Urdu
- No. of seasons: 1

Production
- Producers: Barkat Siddiqui; Momina Duraid
- Production company: MD Productions

Original release
- Network: Hum TV
- Release: 10 August 2025

Masoom is a Pakistani television drama series that premiered on Hum TV on 10 August 2025. Directed by Barkat Siddiqui, the series was written by Content Line and produced by Barkat Siddiqui and MD Productions. It stars Imran Ashraf, Sonya Hussyn and Mikaal Zulfiqar in lead roles, alongside Sidra Niazi, Waseem Abbas, Naveen Naqvi and Shaista Jabeen.

The series follows Dilshad Faisalabadi, a folk singer who travels from Faisalabad to Karachi in pursuit of a musical career. There, he meets Neelo, and the two develop a relationship. Their lives become complicated when Neelo is married to Wijdan, creating a conflict involving love, family expectations and personal choices.

== Cast ==
- Imran Ashraf as Dilshad Faisalabadi
- Sonya Hussyn as Neelo
- Mikaal Zulfiqar as Wijdan
- Sidra Niazi
- Waseem Abbas
- Naveen Naqvi
- Shaista Jabeen
- Abu Hurairah

== Reception ==
In its review of the opening episode, Dawn described the series as an uneven production, while praising Imran Ashraf's performance as Dilshad. The review also expressed reservations about aspects of the other lead performances and the overall presentation of the story.
