= Kiran Malik =

Pakistani actress

- Born: 2 November 1989 (age 36); Karachi, Sindh, Pakistan
- Occupations: Model; Actress; HR consultant
- Years active: 2018 - present
- Spouse: Farooq Malik
- Children: 1

Kiran Malik is a Pakistani model and film actress. She made her acting debut with the movie Pinky Memsaab.

== Early life ==
Born and raised in Karachi, she moved to Dubai and started her professional career as HR consultant and later started modeling. As a model she worked for various leading brands in industry.

== Career ==
In 2018 she debuted in acting with the film Pinky Memsaab which couldn't perform well at box office but her role was appreciated. Though her first film to be shot was Zarrar which got delayed and was later released in 2022. Her role in Pinky Memsaab gave her a breakthrough in the industry and she also got film Money Back Guarantee. She also appeared in a song in the 2022 film Dum Mastam.

== Personal life ==
Kiran married Farooq Malik and together they have a daughter, Imaan.

== Filmography ==
=== Television series ===
Year	Title	Role	Network
2023	Jaisay Aapki Marzi	Natasha	ARY Digital

=== Film ===
Key
†	Denotes films that are not released

Year	Film	Role	Director	Notes
2018	Pinky Memsaab	Mehr Chughtai	Shazia Ali Khan	debut film
2022	Dum Mastam	Dancer	Mohammed Ehteshamuddin	Special appearance in song "Kash Aisa Ho"
2022	Zarrar	Kiran	Shaan Shahid	
2023	Money Back Guarantee	Sanam Baloch	Faisal Qureshi	

== Awards and nominations ==
Year	Award	Category	Result	Title	Ref.
2020	Hum Awards	Most Stylish Film Actor Female (Jury)	Won	—N/a	
