= Umm-e-Kulsoom =

Pakistani television series

- Genre: Drama
- Written by: Sarwat Nazir
- Directed by: Babar Javed
- Starring: Aamina Sheikh; Neelam Muneer; Sami Khan; Faysal Quraishi; Zaheen Tahira; Hasan Ahmed; Jahanara Hai; Ismat Zaidi
- Country of origin: Pakistan
- Original language: Urdu
- No. of episodes: 22

Production
- Producers: Asif Raza Mir; Babar Javed
- Production locations: Karachi, Sindh
- Camera setup: Multi-camera setup
- Running time: 36 - 43 minutes

Original release
- Network: ARY Digital
- Release: 29 May – 23 October 2011

Umm-e-Kulsoom (ام کلثوم) is a Pakistani television series aired during 2011 on ARY Digital. It is directed and co-produced by Babar Javed under banner A&B Entertainment. Aamina Sheikh played the titular role of a hafiza who later develops a passion for singing. The ensemble supporting cast of the series consisting of Hasan Ahmed, Neelam Muneer, Sami Khan and Faysal Quraishi.

== Plot ==
Umm-e-Kulsoom, a university student and a hafiza of the Quran is the apple of her mother's eye. She is engaged to Moosa, the son of her mother's friend, Sajida. One day, Moosa is injured in a car accident and develops a permanent limp. The disability changes him and makes him grumpy. It makes Umme-e-Kulsoom's mother rethink her daughter's future who has to spend her whole life with him. She decides to marry Umm-e-Kulsoom with Arham, a proposal that her daughter-in-law Mehwish brings for her. Misunderstandings arise between her and Moosa and he calls off the engagement upon fixing her marriage with Arham. At the wedding night, it dawns on Umm-e-Kulsoom that Arham is an epilepsy patient. In Arham's house, she is mistreated by her mother-in-law and Arham who teases her due to his mental illness. Her family learns about their truth but Umm-e-Kulsoom decides to live with him due to her brother Atif's honour who had taken money from them. One day due to the torture of her in-laws, Umm-e-Kulsoom gets injured and is admitted to the hospital where she comes across Nihaal Mubarak, an affluent businessman and the same person who has dropped her to her house on her wedding night. He is impressed by her simplicity and contacts her frequently after his encounter with her. Umme-e-Kulsoom's mother-in-law doubts her when she learns about Nihaal. The matter gets worse and she takes divorce when it comes to her self-respect.

She comes back to her mother's house and rejoins her college. Moosa regrets of calling of his relationship with her and sends his proposal to Umme-e-Kulsoom's house. Umm-e-Kulsoom denies to marry again. Nihaal's mother, Begum Raana also brings the proposal of his son to her when he learns that he is the reason for her divorce. Considering the likeness of her younger sister Ruqaiyya for Moosa, Umm-e-Kulsoom finally agrees to marry Nihaal and denies for Moosa. After marriage, the true colour of Nihaal appears and he appears to be a gas lighter and coquettish. On pregnancy, he orders her to abort but she refuses. On the other hand, Rukaiyya's obsession with Moosa brings fruit for her when she is married off with him but he doesn't accept her heartedly. When Nihaal learns of Umm-e-Kulsoom and Moosa's past relationships he starts taunting her constantly. Just considering her as a mare showpiece, he doesn't respect her and tortures her mentally. Nihaal mother's dies meanwhile and she decides to stand for herself and gets a job. Wherever she gets a job, Nihaal fires her by his connections. Ultimately, she decides to become a singer and gets the help of a music teacher. Earlier she was not fond of singing being a Hafiza but later after her miscarriage which happens due to the mistreatment of Nihaal, she decides to take it as a profession and make an identity of herself. Her singing on television make her an overnight star. After achieving stardom, she replies every mistreatment of Nihaal equally. Her grandmother dies and everyone including her mother refuses to accept her due to her singing. The financial condition of her mother gets worse when Atif leaves the house due to the conspiracy of Mehwish. She secretly helps Atif when he meets with a road accident and in the marriage of younger sister Zainab's wedding. She gets tired of her fame and popularity sooner. Nihaal again tries to control her but she doesn't let her to do so. Nihaal then meets with an accident and dies in hospital where she starts reciting the Quran in front of him but forgets suddenly.

After some time, Moosa and Rukaiyya bring a young girl to a madrasa to Umm-e-Kulsoom and tell her that she will read the Quran from her.

== Cast ==
- Aamina Sheikh as Umm-e-Kulsoom
- Faysal Quraishi as Nihaal Mubarak
- Zaheen Tahira as Dadi
- Neelam Muneer as Rukaiyya
- Hasan Ahmed as Atif
- Ismat Zaidi as Maryam
- Jahanara Hai as Begum Raana
- Sami Khan as Moosa
- Aimen Tariq as Mehwish
- Rida Isfahani as Zainab
- Saleem Mairaj as Arham
- Afshan Qureshi as Mehwish's mother
- Hajra Khan as Nina Jamal

== Awards ==
Year	Awards	Category	Recipient/ nominee	Result	Ref.
2012	Lux Style Awards	Best TV Actress (Satellite)	Aamina Sheikh	Nominated	
