= Cake (2018 film) =

2018 Pakistani film

- Directed by: Asim Abbasi
- Written by: Asim Abbasi
- Produced by: Sayed Zulfiqar Abbas Bukhari
- Starring: Sanam Saeed; Aamina Sheikh; Adnan Malik; Beo Zafar; Syed Muhammad Ahmad
- Cinematography: Mo Azmi
- Edited by: Aarti Bajaj
- Music by: The Sketches
- Production companies: Indus Takies; ZAB Films
- Distributed by: B4U Motion Pictures; Excellency Films
- Release date: 30 March 2018 (Pakistan)
- Running time: 125 minutes
- Countries: Pakistan; United Kingdom
- Languages: Urdu; Sindhi
- Budget: Rs. 5 crore (US$180,000)

Cake is a 2018 Pakistani romantic comedy-drama mystery film directed by Asim Abbasi. The film is a joint production by Zulfikar Abbas Bukhari, Asim Abbasi's United Kingdom-based production company Indus Talkies, and a Pakistani film production company ZAB Films. The film stars Sanam Saeed and Aamina Sheikh as lead characters alongside Adnan Malik in his film debut.

A five-part prologue webisodes short-series was also released on YouTube, focusing on the lives of Zara and Adnan in London. It was selected as the Pakistani entry for the Best Foreign Language Film at the 91st Academy Awards, but it was not nominated.

== Cast ==
- Aamina Sheikh as Zareen
- Sanam Saeed as Zara
- Adnan Malik as Romeo
- Mikaal Zulfiqar as Shehryar
- Syed Mohammad Ahmed as Zareen's father
- Beo Zafar as Habiba
- Faris Khalid as Zain
- Hira Hussain as Sana
- Gianbruno Spena as Adnan (Webisodes)

== Production ==
=== Filming ===
The majority of the filming was done in Karachi, interior Sindh, and London.

In a first for Pakistani cinema, the climax scene of the film is a continuous 10 minute, one-take shot with no edits, spanning multiple rooms and multiple characters. In an interview, actress Aamina Sheikh who played Zareen, shared that experience ''That one-take scene was not only about the actors moving – it's about the lights, camera crew, location, frames and all the invisible figures. One-takes are not used in films often, worldwide, so this was quite an experience for us.''

== Release and reception ==
=== Promotions ===
The film is the first ever Pakistani film which had its premiere at Leicester Square, London with national and international media covering the event. The cast of the film toured Bradford where they visited Radio Sangam, Odeon Cinema Leeds, Trafford Centre, Star City and various other places for film promotion.

=== Home media ===
The film was released on Netflix on 15 May 2019.

=== Critical reception ===
Cake released in Pakistan on 30 March 2018, with highly positive reviews from critics.

Areebah Shahid writing for Bolo Jawan praised the film's direction and the performances of the female protagonists, stating, "Cake stands tall among the films that Pakistan can rightly take pride in and showcase for a wider, international audience."

Mike Cahill of The Guardian gave it 4 out of 5 stars. He praised Asim's debut: "Pakistani cinema has long struggled to match its Indian cousin’s commercial reach, but this impressive debut from Asim Abbasi feels like a sound bet, and even quietly revolutionary in places."

Shahjehan Saleem of Something Haute gave it 4.5 out of 5 stars: "Cake shines as a prime example of acting, cinematography, great music, and impeccable direction assimilating into perfection on the silver screen."

Turyal Azam Khan for The Diplomat wrote, "The strong response to the film in its home country has sent an important message to the filmmakers of Pakistan: it is okay to experiment, break barriers and test the audience. The formula is risky and might not always work, but art has no boundaries and that is what Cake displays."

Rahul Aijaz of The Express Tribune gave it 4.5/5 stars. "One slice just won't be enough"

== Accolades ==
The film was showcased at the London Asian Film Festival, now known as the UK Asian Film Festival where it won Best Director for Asim Abbasi.

Award	Category	Recipients and nominees	Results
London Asian Film Festival	Best Director	Asim Abbasi	Won
8th Annual South Asian Film Festival of Montreal	Best Feature - Fiction	Sayed Zulfiqar Abbas Bukhari	Won
18th Lux Style Awards	Best Film	Sayed Zulfiqar Abbas Bukhari	Won
18th Lux Style Awards	Best Director	Asim Abbasi	Nominated
18th Lux Style Awards	Best Actor	Adnan Malik	Nominated
18th Lux Style Awards	Best Actor	Muhammad Ahmed	Nominated
18th Lux Style Awards	Best Actress	Aamina Sheikh	Nominated
18th Lux Style Awards	Best Actress	Sanam Saeed	Nominated
18th Lux Style Awards	Best Playback Singer (Deducted)	The Sketches and Natasha Baig for "Meri Dunya"	Nominated
5th Galaxy Lollywood Awards	Best Film	Sayed Zulfiqar Abbas Bukhari	Nominated
5th Galaxy Lollywood Awards	Best Director	Asim Abbasi	Nominated
5th Galaxy Lollywood Awards	Best Story	Asim Abbasi	Nominated
5th Galaxy Lollywood Awards	Best Actor in a Leading Role Female	Aamina Sheikh	Nominated
5th Galaxy Lollywood Awards	Best Actor in a Supporting Role Male	Adnan Malik	Nominated
5th Galaxy Lollywood Awards	Best Actor in a Supporting Role Male	Syed Mohammad Ahmed	Nominated
5th Galaxy Lollywood Awards	Best Actor in a Supporting Role Female	Beo Rana Zafar	Nominated
5th Galaxy Lollywood Awards	Best Actor in a Supporting Role Female	Sanam Saeed	Won
5th Galaxy Lollywood Awards	Best Male Debut	Adnan Malik	Nominated
5th Galaxy Lollywood Awards	Best Playback Singer Male	The Sketches – "Meri Dunya"	Nominated
5th Galaxy Lollywood Awards	Best Lyricist	The Sketches – "Meri Dunya"	Nominated
5th Galaxy Lollywood Awards	Best Music	The Sketches	Nominated

== Soundtrack ==
All music is composed by The Sketches.

Track list on YouTube
No.	Title	Lyrics	Singer(s)	Length
1.	"Meri Duniya"	The Sketches	The Sketches	4:32
2.	"Sajan Mo Khay"	Shah Abdul Latif Bhittai	Bhagat Bhoora Lal, Rajab Fakeer, Zanwar Hussain	5:26
3.	"Bol" (Male version)		The Sketches	4:47
4.	"Sartyoon"	Shah Abdul Latif Bhittai	Bhagat Bhoora Lal, Shamu Bai	4:19
5.	"Bol" (Female version)		Natasha Humera Ejaz	4:47
6.	"Tiri Pawanda" (Cover)	Shaikh Ayaz	The Sketches	5:13
Total length:				29:04

The film also featured "Piya Tu Ab To Aaja".

== See also ==
- List of Pakistani films of 2018
- List of submissions to the 91st Academy Awards for Best Foreign Language Film
- List of Pakistani submissions for the Academy Award for Best International Feature Film
