= Sonya Hussyn =

Pakistani actress (born 1996)

- سونیا حسین
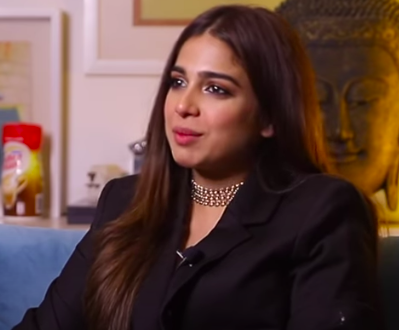
- Hussyn in 2020
- Born: Sonya Hussyn Bukharee; Karachi, Sind, Pakistan
- Education: University of Karachi
- Occupation: Actress
- Years active: 2011–present

Sonya Hussyn Bukharee is a Pakistani actress. She made her acting debut with a supporting role in the 2011 television series Dareecha. She then played leading roles in several series, including Marasim (2014) and Nikah (2015). Hussyn's career progressed with the acclaimed series Aisi Hai Tanhai (2017) and Tinkay Ka Sahara (2022), and the comedy drama film Tich Button (2022). The first of these earned her two Lux Style Award nominations. She was presented with Icon Award by then Prime Minister Shehbaz Sharif in August 2023.

== Career ==
Hussyn has appeared in television series aired on ARY Digital and Hum TV. She is known for her work on the series Mere Hamrahi, Mein Hari Piya, Marasim, and Angeline Malik's Kitni Girhain Baaki Hain. Moreover, she is known for portraying supporting roles in Meri Behan Meri Dewrani, Nadamat, Dareecha, Umm-e-Kulsoom and Shehryar Shehzadi. She has appeared in period drama Aangan, portraying the role of Salma. She made her debut on the big screen with Jami's Moor in which she played the supporting character of Amber and later starred in the leading role in Azaadi. She has since starred in the films Tich Button (2022) and Sorry: A Love Story (2023).

== Filmography ==
=== Film ===
Key
†	Denotes film/serial that have not yet been released

Year	Title	Role	Notes	Ref.
2015	Moor	Amber	Debut film	
2018	Azaadi	Zara		
2022	Tich Button	Shakeela		
2023	Daadal	Haya Baloch		
2025	Deemak	Hiba - Faraz's wife		
2026	Psycho	Sarah		

=== Television ===
Year	Title	Role	Notes	Ref(s)
2011	Dareecha	Surraya	Debut	
2011	Mujhay Sandal Kar Do	Rida		
2012	Nadamat	Anam		
2012	Don't Jealous	Alishba		
2012	Kitni Girhain Baaki Hain	Various	Episode: 6, 19, 31, 33, 38 & 42	
2012	Sasural Ke Rang Anokhay	Various	2 episodes	
2012	Meri Behan Meri Dewrani	Neha		
2012	Shehryar Shehzadi	Sanam		
2013	Teesri Manzil	Zenia		
2013	Mere Harjai	Maheen		
2013	Mein Hari Piya	Parisa		
2013	Mere Hamrahi	Haniya Ahmed		
2014	Aise Jale Jiya	Lubna		
2014	Sharek-e-Hayat	Recurring	3 episodes	
2014	Shikwa	Meher Saqib		
2014	Khuda Na Kare	Abrish		
2014	Marasim	Momina		
2015	Nikah	Ayesha		
2015	Mamta			
2015	Farwa Ki ABC	Farwa		
2015	Nazo	Nazish		
2015	Surkh Jorra	Abiha/Zimmal		
2016	Main Kamli	Zulekha		
2016	Mera Dard Bayzuban	Savera		
2016	Kisay Chahoon	Mehru Ameer		
2016	Haasil	Rimsha		
2017	Aisi Hai Tanhai	Pakeeza Islam		
2017	Kitni Girhain Baaki Hain 2	Jhalli	Episode 11	
2018	Meri Guriya	Safeena		
2018	Aangan	Salma	Extended cameo	
2019	Ishq Zahe Naseeb	Gohar		
2020	Mohabbat Tujhe Alvida	Ulfat		
2020	Saraab	Hoorain		
2022	Mor Moharan	Rohi		
2022	Tinkay Ka Sahara	Qadar		
2022	Tere Bina Mein Nahi	Noor-ul-Ain		
2024	Aik Chuban Si	Naila		
2024	Akhara	Sitara		
2025	Masoom	Neeli		

=== Telefilm ===
Year	Title	Role	Network	Notes	Ref(s)
2015	Lucknow Wale Lateefullah	Maira Ahmed			
2022	Siwaiyaan	Surraya	Neelo	ARY Digital	
2022	Dil Phisla Rey	Rida	Maya		

== Awards and nominations ==
Year	Nominee / work	Award	Result	Ref.
ARY Film Awards
2016	Moor	Best Actor Female	Nominated	
Lux Style Awards
2018	Aisi Hai Tanhai	Best Television Actress - Viewers	Nominated	
2018	Aisi Hai Tanhai	Best Television Actress - Critics	Nominated	
Pakistan International Screen Awards
2021	Saraab	Best Television Actress - Jury	Won	

Year	Award	Category	Work	Result	Ref(s)
2025	Eurasian Open Award "Diamond Butterfly"	Best Actor Award	Deemak	Won	
