= Aagha Ali =

Pakistani actor, presenter and singer

Agha Ali
- Born: Agha Ali Abbas; 4 December 1985 (age 40); Lahore, Punjab, Pakistan
- Education: Forman Christian College, BA
- Occupations: Actor; singer; writer; composer; director
- Years active: 2006–present
- Father: Agha Sikandar
- Relatives: Ali Abbas (cousin); Waseem Abbas (maternal uncle); Inayat Hussain Bhatti (maternal grandfather); Kaifee (maternal granduncle); Ali Sikandar (brother); Ali Azmat (mother's cousin)

Aagha Ali Abbas (Urdu: آغا علی عباس; born 4 December 1985) is a Pakistani television actor, singer, presenter, writer, song writer, and director.

== Early life and background ==
Aagha Ali was born on 4 December 1985 in Lahore, Punjab.

He is the youngest son of the widely known actor of the 1980s, Agha Sikandar (d. 1993), himself the son-in-law of the legendary singer, actor, and producer Inayat Hussain Bhatti, who is thus Aagha Ali's maternal grandfather, making him a nephew of the television actor Waseem Abbas as well as a cousin of Ali Abbas and also the grandnephew of actor Kaifee. His brother Ali Sikandar is also an actor and writer while singer-turned-actor Ali Azmat is his mother's cousin.

Aagha graduated with a Bachelor's degree in Arts from the Forman Christian College.

== Career ==
Aagha started his journey in the entertainment industry while still in college, at the age of 19. He became active in theater and performed as an actor/singer in 15 to 20 theater plays.

Officially his TV career started as an anchor-host in 2006 with the channel ATV, and with the successful program Total Round Up. He won the Best Anchor Award for the same program at the ATV Awards in 2006.

He started his acting career with Yaad Piya Ki Aaye (2005) as Sameer, and then Satrangi (2008).

He took a hiatus of about three years for his education, and during that time made the music video, "Mera Pehla Rock Song", which was launched at the platform of the national television PTV Home in the show Morning With Juggan on 9 January 2013.

His leading role in the romantic series Mein Hari Piya (2012), on Hum TV, was well received by the critics and the public, and earned him a nomination for the Hum Award for Best Soap Actor. Rukhsaar, a television series on Geo TV, gained him further success. This was followed by the musical covers "Khwab Adhoore Sahi" and "Aaj Bhi". In 2014, he starred in Mere Meherbaan, Mehram and Digest Writer.

His career further advanced with the role of a rockstar in the 2015 religious drama series, Khuda Dekh Raha Hai, opposite Sajal Aly, for which he also sang the title song. Agha then played leading roles in several successful series, including Andaaz-e-Sitam (2017), Tumhare Hain (2017), Band Khirkiyan (2019), and Dil-e-Gumshuda (2019), which added to his popularity.

Recently, he played the lead in the very popular drama Mujhe Khuda Pay Yakeen Hai which aired on Geo Entertainment.

== Personal life ==
Aagha's struggle story and his perseverance in the media industry have made headlines, as it was a challenging journey for him to establish himself. He was also in the news for a couple of years for his relationship with co-actor Sarah Khan, and they were a popular couple at the time, but things changed when they broke up.

In 2019, he met Hina Altaf during the filming of the drama series Dil-e-Gumshuda. The couple tied the knot in a private Nikah ceremony on 22 May 2020, in Karachi.

As of 2023, Aagha and Hina were rumored to have separated. He mentioned in one of his interviews with Ayaz Samoo about living alone. However, an official announcement was made later by Aagha himself that they are no longer together.

== Filmography ==
=== Television ===
Year	Serial	Role	Channel	Notes
2006	Yaad Piya Ki Aaye	Sameer	PTV Home	
2008	Satrangi	Khayyam	Geo TV	
2008	Teri Ik Nazar	Rameez	Geo TV	
2009	Jinnah Ke Naam	Sameer	PTV Home	
2010	Mujhe Hai Hukum-e-Azan	Jimmy	Hum TV	
2013	Mein Hari Piya	Zawar	Hum TV	Nominated—Hum Award for Best Soap Actor
2013	Halki Si Khalish	Aamir	Hum TV	
2013	Agar Tum Na Hote	Hammad	A-Plus TV	
2013	Kami Reh Gaee	Rizwan	PTV Home	
2013	Ghundi	Rehan	Hum Sitaray	
2014	Shehr-e-Yaran	Ahsan	ARY Digital	
2014	Arranged Marriage	Ahmad	ARY Digital	
2014	Shab-e-Zindagi	Yasir	Hum TV	
2014	Rukhsaar	Amaar	Geo TV	
2014	Bay Emaan Mohabbat	Baber	ARY Digital	
2014	Mere Meherbaan	Zeeshan	Hum TV	
2014–2015	Mehram	Areeb	Hum TV	Also playback singer for the song "Dararien"
2014–2015	Digest Writer	Shehreyar	Hum TV	
2014–2015	Noori	Tariq	TVOne	
2015	Mere Khuda	Yasir	Hum TV	
2015	Khuda Dekh Raha Hai	Junaid	A-Plus TV	Also playback singer, writer and composer for the song "Akhiyan Num Num" The OST of the project
2015	Maamta	Maaz	ARY Digital	
2015	Kis Se Kahoon	Fahad	PTV Home	
2015	Tum Yaad Aye	Shehreyar	Ary Digital	
2015	Tere Mere Beech	Fahad	Hum TV	
2016	Ghalti	Saim	A-Plus TV	
2017	Andaaz e Sitam	Wamiq	Urdu 1	
2017	Tumhare Hain	Rayan	ARY Digital	
2017	Be Inteha	Zaid	Urdu 1	
2017	Bedardi Saiyaan	Shaani	Geo TV	
2018	Mere Bewafa	Shahmeer	A-Plus TV	Also playback singer, writer and composer for the song "Duhaiyaan" The OST of the project
2018	Khatti Methi Love Story	Bilal	Express Entertainment	
2018	Band Khirkiyan	Zain	Hum TV	
2019	Dil-e-Gumshuda	Daniyal	Geo TV	
2020	Teray Pyar Mai	Zaman	Geo TV	Telefilm
2020	Khoob Seerat	Samar	Geo TV	
2020	Dikhawa	Danish	Geo TV	Episode: "Keraye Ki Izzat"
2020	Haqeeqat	Armaan	A-Plus TV	Episode:"Anna"
2020	Aik Aur Munafiq	Rashid	Geo TV	Episode Jholi
2021	Mujhe Khuda Pay Yaqeen Hai	Hammad	Geo TV	
2021	Makafaat Season 3	Salman	Geo TV	Episode: "Usool Aur Sachai"
2022	Zakham	Sikander	Geo TV	
2023	Dhoka	Ahmed	ARY Digital	
2024	Ishqaway	Shahrukh Amin	Geo TV	
2024	Habil aur Qabil	Haris Qazalbaash	Geo TV	
2025	Mohra	Sikander Hamdani	Geo TV	

=== Web series ===
Year	Title	Role	Network	Notes
2021	Raat	Ali	UrduFlix	Also The Writer and Director of the project.

=== Films ===
Agha started shooting for his Debut Action Film under the direction of (Late) Iqbal Kashmiri. Kashmiri died and the film was left incomplete.

Year	Serial	Role	Channel	Notes
2021	Zoya Nay Haan Kardi	Ashir	Geo TV	Teleflim
2021	Shadi hai Impossible		ARY Digital	Teleflim
2022	Love Life Ka Law	Agha	Geo TV	Telefilm
2022	Bhagam Bhag	Shahmir	ARY Digital	Telefilm
2024	Kabhi Aar Kabhi paar		ARY Digital	Telefilm
2024	Band Baja aur Bajiya		Express Entertainment	Telefilm
