= Nikah (serial) =

Pakistani television series

- Genre: Drama; Family drama Romance film Revenge
- Written by: Nasir Hussain
- Directed by: Ahmed Bhatti
- Starring: Junaid Khan; Sonya Hussain; Sanam Chaudhry; Tipu Shah; Shehreyar Zaidi; Saba Faisal; Seemi Pasha
- Theme music composer: Waqar Ali
- Opening theme: "Hum Tere Nikah Mein Hain"
- Country of origin: Pakistan
- Original language: Urdu
- No. of seasons: 1
- No. of episodes: 23

Production
- Producer: Wajahat Rauf
- Cinematography: Ali Shah
- Running time: approx. 40 minutes

Original release
- Network: Hum TV
- Release: 4 January – 14 June 2015

Nikah (Eng Marriage) is a Pakistani television series aired from 2014 to 2015 on Hum TV. It is presented by Momina Duraid, written by Nasir Hussain, and stars Sonya Hussain and Junaid Khan in leads.

== Synopsis ==
The story revolves around Ayesha and Rohail, who are engaged to each other. Being first cousins, they have spent their childhood in the same house and are quite close. Rohail has always dreamt of going abroad for higher studies and his dreams come true after he completes his schooling. With priorities changing over time, Rohail finds himself attracted to Zara and marries her without letting his family know, fearing that they would not approve of it.

== Cast ==
- Junaid Khan as Rohail
- Sonya Hussain as Ayesha (Rohail's First Wife)
- Sanam Chaudhry as Zara (Rohail's Second Wife)
- Tipu Sharif as Nadeem
- Shehryar Zaidi As Rohail's Dad
- Saba Faisal as Nadeem's mother
- Seemi Pasha as Rohail's Mom
- Kiran Tabeir as Zubi
- Rahma Khan as Young Ayesha

== See also ==
- List of programs broadcast by Hum TV
