= Seedlings (film) =

- Theatrical release poster
- Urdu: Lamha
- Directed by: Summer Nicks Mansoor Mujahid and Meher Jaffri
- Screenplay by: Summer Nicks
- Story by: Summer Nicks
- Produced by: Meher Jaffri; Summer Nicks; Craig Peter Jones
- Starring: Mohib Mirza; Aamina Sheikh; Gohar Rasheed; Hira Tareen; Mehreen Rafi; Tara Mahmood
- Edited by: Wajahatullah (Waji) Khan
- Music by: Usman Riaz
- Production company: Bodhicitta Works Production
- Distributed by: ARY Films
- Release date: 20 September 2013
- Country: Pakistan
- Language: Urdu

Seedlings (Urdu: لمحہ, romanized: Lamha; lit. 'Moment'), is a 2013 Lollywood social drama film directed by Summer Nicks, Meher Jaffri and Mansoor Mujahid and produced by Meher Jaffri and Summer Nicks. The film stars leading Pakistani TV actors and then married couple Mohib Mirza and Aamina Sheikh. The film was released in Pakistan (Karachi) on 20 September 2013. It also had its world premiere in the United States at the New York Film Festival.

== Plot ==
The story of Lamha revolves around a happy couple whose lives are left reeling for stability after a devastating accident.

== Cast ==
- Mohib Mirza as Raza
- Aamina Sheikh as Maliha
- Gohar Rasheed as Anil
- Hira Tareen
- Tara Mahmood
- Mehreen Rafi

== Awards ==
The film premiered in the New York Film Festival and won or was nominated for several awards. It went on to be nominated for many other awards and in various international film festivals across the globe.

Awards
Venue	Recipient	Category	Result
SARCC Film Festival	Summer Nicks, Meher Jaffri	Best Film	Won
SARCC Film Festival	Aamina Sheikh	Best Actress in a Leading Role	Won
People's Choice Award	Summer Nicks, Meher Jaffri	Best Film	Won
New York Film Festival	Aamina Sheikh	Best Performance by an Actress	Won
New York Film Festival	Mansoor Mujahid	Best Director	Nominated
New York Film Festival	Mohib Mirza	Best Actor in a Leading Role	Nominated
New York Film Festival	Gohar Rasheed	Best Actor in a Supporting Role	Nominated
New York Film Festival	Summer Nicks	Best Original Screenplay	Nominated
New York Film Festival	Usman Riaz	Best Original Score	Nominated
New York Film Festival	Summer Nicks, Meher Jaffri	Best Film	Nominated
Vancouver Film Festival	Summer Nicks, Meher Jaffri	Best Film	Nominated
London Asian Film Festival	Summer Nicks, Meher Jaffri	Best Film	Nominated
Washington DC South Asian Film Festival	Summer Nicks, Meher Jaffri	Best Film	Won
Washington DC South Asian Film Festival	Mansoor Mujahid	Best Director	Nominated
Washington DC South Asian Film Festival	Summer Nicks	Best Screenplay	Nominated
Lux Style Awards	Mohib Mirza	Best Film Actor	Nominated
Lux Style Awards	Gohar Rasheed	Best Film Actor	Nominated
Lux Style Awards	Aamina Sheikh	Best Film Actress	Won
Pakistan Media Awards	Lamha	Best Film	Nominated
Pakistan Media Awards	Summer Nicks	Best Film Director	Nominated
Pakistan Media Awards	Mohib Mirza	Best Film Actor	Won
Pakistan Media Awards	Aamina Sheikh	Best Film Actress	Nominated
