= Pinky Memsaab =

- Directed by: Shazia Ali Khan
- Written by: Shazia Ali Khan
- Screenplay by: Shazia Ali khan and Babar Ali
- Produced by: Fahad Shaikh; Umr Khan; Raza Namazi; Shazia Ali Khan; Yusuf Ali Khan
- Starring: Hajra Yamin; Kiran Malik; Sunny Hinduja; Khalid Ahmed; Shamim Hilaly
- Cinematography: Humza Yousaf
- Edited by: Suraj Gunjal
- Music by: Abbas Ali Khan
- Production company: Shoot at Sight
- Distributed by: Vox Cinema
- Release date: 7 December 2018
- Running time: 124 minutes
- Country: Pakistan
- Language: Urdu

Pinky Memsaab (transl. Pinky Madam) is a 2018 Urdu-language Pakistani drama film. The film stars Hajra Yamin, Kiran Malik, Adnan Jaffar, Sunny Hinduja, Khalid Ahmed and Shamim Hilaly. It was distributed by Eveready Pictures on 7 December 2018.

== Plot summary ==
A gullible, young Punjabi woman (Pinky) from a small village in Pakistan, is brought to work as a maid for the glamorous Dubai socialite (Mehr) and her affluent investment banker husband (Hassan). Burdened by her preconceived notions and lack of exposure, Pinky initially struggles but as time passes, she begins to enjoy her new life, makes unusual friends and becomes increasingly fascinated with the privileged yet unhappy Mehr. The story takes a turn when Mehr, who is secretly an aspiring writer decides to play puppet master to her adoring disciple and takes Pinky under her wings to bring about an astonishing transformation...Things go a bit too far and one fateful evening, the lives of both women along with others around them are thrown into a series of uncontrollable events that threaten to destroy them. The film twists and turns through a cross section of characters and locations; from the seductive and glamorous lives of Jumeirah, to the ugly and harsh realities of Bur Dubai's struggling working class; to the lush green hills of Islamabad and the wisdom of returning home to heal, as the mistress and her muse face their inner demons and realize who they truly are.

== Cast ==
- Hajra Yamin as Pinky
- Kiran Malik as Mehr Chughtai
- Adnan Jaffar as Hassan Chughtai
- Sunny Hinduja as Santosh
- Shamim Hilaly as Jahaan Ara, Mehr's step-mother
- Khalid Ahmed as Qutb
- Mariel Bianca Salazar as Grace
- Hajra Khan as Kulsoom

== Accolades ==
Award	Category	Recipients and nominees	Results	Ref.
18th Lux Style Awards	Best Film Actress	Hajra Yamin	Nominated	
