= Zarrar =

2022 film by Shaan Shahid

- Cinematic Poster
- Directed by: Shaan Shahid
- Written by: Shaan Shahid
- Produced by: Ejaz Shahid; Adnan Butt
- Starring: Shaan Shahid; Kiran Malik; Nadeem Baig; Nayyar Ejaz; Shafqat Cheema; Rasheed Naz
- Cinematography: Timothy Hallam Wood
- Edited by: Majid Cheema
- Music by: Yasir Jaswal; Thomas Farnon
- Production companies: Jehan Films; Pinewood Studios
- Distributed by: ARY Films
- Release date: 25 November 2022
- Running time: 148 minutes
- Country: Pakistan
- Languages: Urdu; English
- Box office: Rs. 12.90 crore (US$460,000)

Zarrar is a 2022 Pakistani spy action thriller film written and directed by Shaan Shahid and produced by Ejaz Shahid and Adnan Butt under the banner of Jehan Films. It stars Shaan Shahid as the titular character along with Kiran Malik, Nadeem Baig, Nayyer Ejaz and Shafqat Cheema in supporting roles. The film was officially released worldwide on November 25, 2022.

The idea for 'Zarrar' initially began in 2016 as the ISI's response to alleged RAW-sponsored Bollywood films. Zaraar is considered to be Pakistan's second spy thriller action film after the release of 2014's O21.

The film has received mixed to negative reviews.

== Plot ==
A secret agent named, Zarrar (Shahid) has gone rogue after his homeland, Pakistan has been plunged with corruption when he finds out that a secret international operation has plans to dismantle the Pakistani government and subsequently gain control of its Nuclear Weapons Programme. Aiming to end the seemingly endless cycle of threats, he gets help from a close friend, Colonel Mustajab (Baig). With time running out, Zarrar must act fast in terminating the greatest threat Pakistan has come up against since its inception.

== Cast ==
- Shaan Shahid as Zarrar: A former secret agent gone rouge.
- Kiran Malik as Kiran: A journalist and love interest of Zarrar.
- Nadeem Baig as Major General Mustajab of the ISI, the mentor of the protagonist.
- Shafqat Cheema as Ravinder Kaushik
- Rasheed Naz as Fahimullah Khan
- Nayyar Ejaz as Salman Shah as the main antagonist.

== Release ==
It was released on 25 November 2022. It was originally set for release sometime in 2020 but was delayed due to the COVID-19 pandemic. The film was then moved to release on September 23, 2022, but was moved from that date due to the 2022 Pakistan Floods. After multiple delays, the film was then moved to its current release date in November.

== Production ==
=== Development ===
Development of the project started in 2016 when behind the scene shots of the film were shared by Shaan himself.

UK based Director of Photography (DOP) Tim Wood was hired for the project.

Shaan had chosen Pinewood Studios UK, for the post production of the film after which he did with his earlier film, Arth - The Destination which was a remake of the original Arth.

== See also ==
- List of Pakistani films of 2022
- List of highest-grossing Pakistani films
- Cinema of Pakistan
- Lollywood
