= Hajra Yamin =

Pakistani actress (born 1990)

- حاجرہ یامین
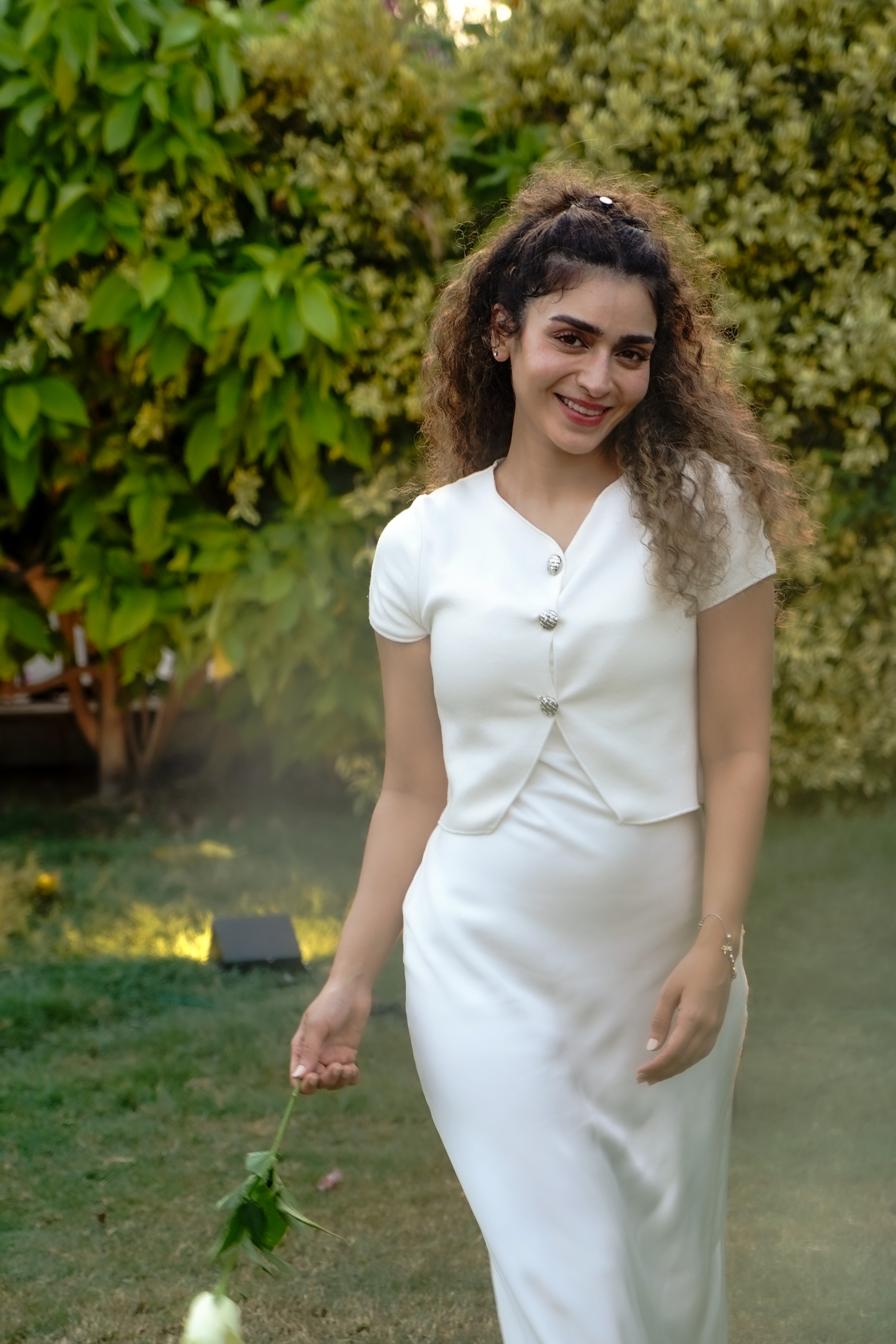
- Pronunciation: Huh-jrah Yuh-meen
- Born: 17 July 1990 (age 36); Multan, Punjab, Pakistan
- Education: Fatima Jinnah Women University & Roots College International
- Occupations: Actress, model
- Years active: 2016–present

Hajra Yamin (Urdu: ہاجرہ یامین; born 17 July 1990) is a Pakistani actress who has appeared in Urdu television serials. She made her film debut with a supporting role in Maan Jao Na (2018). She later appeared as a leading lady in Pinky Memsaab (2018), which earned her a nomination for Best Actress at Lux Style Awards. Her other notable roles are in the drama Ehd-e-Wafa (2019) and Noor Jahan (2024).

== Philanthropy ==
Hajra Yamin is an ambassador and spokesperson for the Indus Hospital and Health Network, participating in fundraising campaigns to support children battling illness at the hospital. She collaborates with Sania Saeed to raise funds and awareness for the hospital's mission to provide free healthcare for the poor, particularly children.

== Filmography ==
=== Film ===
Year	Title	Role	Notes	Ref(s)
2018	Maan Jao Naa	Sara		
2018	Pinky Memsaab	Pinky	Nominated–Lux Style Awards for Best Film Actress	
2022	Zarrar			
2023	Money Back Guarantee			

=== Television ===
Year	Title	Role	Network	Notes	Ref(s)
2016	Haya Kay Rang	Fizza			
2017	Bholi Bano	Shela			
2017	Tau Dil Ka Kia Hua	Lubna			
2017	Teri Raza	Rameez's sister			
2017	Pujaran	Ariba			
2018	Kabhi Band Kabhi Baja	Jia		Episode 25	
2018	Tabeer	Sania			
2018	Ishq Na Kariyo Koi	Maryam			
2018	Baandi	Rameen		Nominated–Hum Award for Best Supporting Actress	
2019	Choti Choti Batain	Anaya Saif	Hum TV	Episode "Dil Hi Tou Hai"	
2019	Naqab Zan	Farhat Aamir			
2019	Ehd-e-Wafa	Ramsha Jaffer	Hum TV		
2019	Aas	Hania			
2020	Sheher-e-Malal	Rameen Shazir			
2020	Jalan	Areej Ahmer			
2020	Tera Ghum Aur Hum	Maheen Shakeel			
2020	Be Adab	Sheena Akram			
2021	Mere Apne	Neha			
2021	Mohabbat Chor Di Maine	Komal Omer			
2022	Hum 2 Hamary 100	Noor			
2023	Shanaas	Aneesa	Green Entertainment		
2023	Hum 2 Hamaray 100 Season 2	Noor			
2023	Jindo	Falak Hasrat	Green Entertainment		
2023	Wonderland	Sunehri	Green Entertainment		
2024	Chand Nagar	Shiza			
2024	Noor Jahan	Sumbul Kumail Shah (nee Javed)	ARY Digital		
2025	Main Manto Nahi Hoon	Ifra	ARY Digital		
2025	Pehli Barish		Geo Entertainment		
2026	Doctor Bahu	Minha	ARY Digital		
2026	Humrahi	Raniya	Geo Entertainment		
2026	Aik Mohabbat Aur		Green Entertainment		

=== Web series ===
Year	Title	Role	Notes	Ref.
2021	Qatil Haseenaon Ke Naam	Dolla		
