= Dil Diyan Gallan (film) =

2018 television film

- Genre: Drama; Comedy; Romance
- Written by: Atiq Inayat
- Screenplay by: Shahzad Javed
- Directed by: Faheem Burney
- Starring: Zahid Ahmed; Saba Qamar
- Country of origin: Pakistan
- Original language: Urdu

Production
- Producer: Momina Duraid
- Production company: Momina Duraid Productions

Original release
- Network: Hum TV
- Release: 18 June 2018

Dil Diyan Gallan (transl. Matters of the heart; previously titled Naiki Kar Doob Marr) is a 2018 Pakistani drama television film directed by Fahim Burney. The film was released on Eid-ul-Fitr 2018 and written by Atiq Inayat, with Shahzad Javed developing the screenplay. The telefilm was produced by Momina Duraid under their production banner Momina Duraid Productions, and stars Saba Qamar and Zahid Ahmed in lead roles.

== Plot ==
Raniya (Saba Qamar) calls her boyfriend Vicky (Asad Arsalan) and asks him to meet her at a railway station. After packing her clothes, she reaches the station, but cannot find Vicky there. While waiting for him, she meets Hassan (Zahid Ahmed), a writer. Dejected, Raniya is about to commit suicide, but Hassan talks her out of it, citing the effects it would have on her family.

Raniya explains her situation to Hassan, who suggests posing as Vicky in front of her family so that they can reject him. She agrees and takes him to meet her family, but the opposite happens. They get married.

After getting married, they gradually start to have feelings for each other, but don't express them. One day, Hassan plans to express his feelings, but finds Raniya meeting Vicky. Seeing as how Raniya still likes Vicky, he decides not to tell her.

Later, the couple tell the truth to their family, while Raniya confides in her paternal aunt (Phuppo) that she actually loves Hassan, who sends a letter to her expressing his love. Phuppo advises her to follow her heart. Therefore, she meets Hassan at the railway station and finally expresses her feelings.

== Cast ==
- Zahid Ahmed as Hassan
- Saba Qamar as Raniya
- Saife Hassan as Raniya's father
- Durdana Butt as Daadi; Raniya's grandmother
- Arslan Asad Butt as Vicky; Raniya's love interest
- Najia Baig as Phuppo; Raniya's aunt
- Raju Jamil as Hassan's friend

== Production ==
The film was initially named Naiki Kar Doob Marr but the makers changed the title to Dil Diyan Gallan.

In early June 2018, Qamar announced on her social media about the project. Speaking about the film, Zahid revealed to a magazine, "It's a comedy film that will be fun to watch", the actor also informed that he has never done any comic role but Qamar was the reason he accepted that offer. Talking about the story of the telefilm, Zahid added "It's a story about a romantic relationship of young couple and targeted at young generation who are not ready to compromise in relationships".

Both the actors will be sharing the screen for the third time as they previously appeared in successful drama serials Sangat and Besharam. Talking to hip, Qamar added, "It's highly interesting and going to be one of the happening projects".

Filming began in early June. First spell took place in Karachi, Pakistan. The film released on third day of Eid in June 2018 by Hum TV.
