= Balgan =

Balagan
- Village
- Location in Pakistan
- Coordinates: 32°42′5″N 74°33′6″E
- Country: Pakistan
- Province: Punjab
- District: Sialkot
- Time zone: UTC+5 (PST)

Balagan (also spelled Balaggan) is a village in Sialkot District in the Punjab province of Pakistan. It is situated 23.5 km from Sialkot city. Agriculture is the primary industry, and rice, wheat, potatoes, sugarcane and watermelon the main crops. Mustard or Saag and rice are staple foods.
