= Adnan Malik =

Pakistani actor

- Born: 9 June 1984 (age 42); Islamabad, Punjab, Pakistan
- Education: Vassar College, United States, & International School of Islamabad
- Occupations: Actor, model, VJ, documentary filmmaker, Video producer, music video producer, commercial director, music video director and visual storyteller
- Years active: 2002–present
- Parent: Perveen Malik (mother)
- Relatives: Saqib Malik (brother)
- Website: amp.com.pk

Adnan Malik (Urdu: عدنان ملک) is a Pakistani film and television actor, director, and producer under his own company's banner, AMP. He is also WWF Pakistan's goodwill ambassador and an Asia Society, Asia 21 Fellow and Young Leader of the World. Malik has also served on the board for the Citizen's Archive of Pakistan.

As an actor, he made his television debut with the hit series Sadqay Tumhare for Hum TV. Portraying the writer of the drama, Khalil-ur-Rehman Qamar, in an autobiographical piece, Malik earned three nominations at 3rd Hum Awards, winning two including Best Television Sensation Male and Best Onscreen Couple opposite Mahira Khan. He received his first Best TV Actor nomination at 15th Lux Style Awards. He followed up the series by playing a wanderlust photographer, Sikander in romantic drama series Dil Banjaara for Hum Network, alongside Sanam Saeed and Mira Sethi.

In 2018, he made his film debut with Cake, which was directed by Asim Abbasi. He played the character called Romeo in the film.

As a director, his documentary Bijli earned him the Best Short Film award at Kara Film Festival in 2003. He directed The Forgotten Song or Bhuli Hui Hoon Daastan, the first feature-length documentary on Pakistani cinema, that played at festivals around the world, is an integral part of film syllabi across the country and was also instrumental in allowing Indian films to be re-screened in Pakistan after a 42-year ban. He also directed the promotional music video for Jawani Phir Nahi Ani and has directed television commercials for brands like Coca-Cola, Nescafé, Cornetto, Fanta, and Oye Hoye! among others.

== Early life and education ==
His ancestral roots lie in the Shamsabad village, near Attock.

His father is a cardiologist and his mother Parveen Malik is an early childhood educator and part-time TV actress.

His brother Saqib Malik is a director.

== Career ==
=== Documentaries ===
After studying film-making in US, he started working on directing documentaries, such as Why We Fight which cited as one of a "best American Documentary" at Sundance Film Festival 2005. Adnan came back to Pakistan in 2005 but before coming made a short subject documentary Bijli which won Best Short Film at Kara Film Festival, Delhi Digital Film Festival and was finalist at United States Student Academy Awards 2003. His second documentary, Bhuli Hui Hoon Dastaan (The Forgotten Song), was commissioned by Geo TV and played at festivals around the world. After Mushtaq Gazdar's book on Pakistani Cinema, this documentary was the only other major research piece on the subject.

=== TV commercials and music videos ===
Malik has modelled with clothing brands and was a VJ at MTV. He serves as an associate video producer and behind the scene producer at Coke Studio for four years. Malik then directed and produced TV commercials for Pepsi, Djuice, Telenor, Wall's, Cornetto, Nescafe, LUX etc. He also directed a music video for Levi's Mera Bichra Yaar in collaboration with Strings and Zoe Viccaji which earned him a Best Music Video Director at 11th Lux Style Awards. In 2012 he directed/produced a video My Punjabi Love For You for Bumbu Sauce, featuring Aamina Sheikh and Rizwan Ali Jaffri. In addition he has also directed Lux Style Awards ceremonies for four years. In 2016, he directed critically acclaimed short-film Love is in the Air for Cornetto under advertising agency Ogilvy & Mather Pakistan, Adnan said, "I never expected such a response but I did believe it would have an empowering impact on some people. Multiply this by ten and you get a feature film, that's the goal...one day!."

=== Acting ===
Malik marked his professional-acting debut in 2007 with Zibahkhana: Hell's Ground and followed that with an appearance in Slackistan in 2008. Later he appeared in 2014 Hum TV's drama serial Sadqay Tumhare written by Khalil-ur-Rehman based on his own life-story and directed by Mohammed Ehteshamuddin, portraying Khalil opposite to Mahira Khan, as her love interest. He describes his experience in the serial as "personal growth". and he received three Hum Award nominations winning two including Hum Award for Best Television Sensation Male, Hum Award for Best Onscreen Couple and was nominated for Hum Award for Best Actor Popular. Malik received his first Best TV Actor nomination at 15th Lux Style Awards. Before the serial he played a supporting role in controversial film Slackistan. In 2016, he was cast in a role of Sikandar an aspiring photographer in romantic drama series Dil Banjaara, opposite Sanam Saeed and Mira Sethi. In an interview with Dawn News, Malik describes, "I play the role of Sikander, who's an aspiring photographer, a part of him that resonates with me because that's what peaked my interest in the arts, when my father bought me my first camera. He's a very rugged, outdoorsy kinda guy, very different from Khalil. There's just this lightness to him. So the show revolves around this guy who's a bit of a wanderer and his equation with two ladies, a non-traditional love triangle of sorts."

=== Production house ===
Malik owns a boutique media production house called Adnan Malik Production (AMP), where he directs and produces TV commercials, documentaries, music videos and photography.

== Non-film work ==
=== Fashion design ===
While in New York City he owned a tee-shirt company named Urban Turban, his products being popular enough to attract the attention of famed fashion designer and stylist Patricia Field.

== Filmography ==
=== Documentaries ===
- Bijli
- Bhuli Hui Hoon Dastaan
- Social Circus
- Telephone Payar

=== Music videos and short films ===
- Mera Bichra Yaar –
- Phir Milli Tanhai
- My Punjabi Love for You
- Phir Se Game Utha Dain
- Love is in the Air

=== Film ===
Year	Title	Role	Notes
2007	Zibahkhana: Hell's Ground	Yuppy Victim	
2010	Slackistan	Guest appearance	Also assistant camera and associate producer
2011	Love Mein Ghum	Guest appearance	
2018	Cake	Romeo	Proper film debut, as a main role

=== Television ===
Year	Title	Role
2014–15	Sadqay Tumhare	Khalil
2016	Dil Banjaara	Sikander
2016	Bin Roye	Aamir

=== Webseries ===
Year	Title	Role	Notes
2020	Churails	KK	Released on ZEE5

== Awards and nominations ==
Year	Nominated work	Award	Result
2003	Bijli	Kara Film Festival Award for Best Short Film	Won
2003	Bijli	Delhi Digital Festival Best Short Film	Won
2005	N/A	Lux Style Award for Best Model of the Year (male)	Nominated
2006	N/A	Lux Style Award for Best Model of the Year (male)	Nominated
2012	Mera Bichra Yaar	Lux Style Award for Best Music Video Director	Nominated
2014	My Punjabi Love for You	Lux Style Award for Best Music Video Director	Nominated
2015	Sadqay Tumhare	Hum Award for Best Actor Popular	Nominated
2015	Sadqay Tumhare	Hum Award for Best Television Sensation Male	Won
2015	Sadqay Tumhare	Hum Award for Best Onscreen Couple	Won
2015	Phir Mili Tanhai	Hum Award for Best Music Video	Nominated
2016	Sadqay Tumhare	Lux Style Award for Best TV Actor	Nominated
2019	Cake	Lux Style Award for Best Film Actor	Nominated

== See also ==
- List of Lollywood actors
