= Rasheed Naz =

Pakistani film and television actor (1948–2022)

- رشید ناز
- Born: 9 September 1948; Peshawar, North-West Frontier Province, Pakistan
- Died: 17 January 2022 (aged 73); Islamabad, Pakistan
- Occupations: TV actor, film actor
- Years active: 1971 – 2017
- Family: Madiha Rizvi (daughter-in-law, Divorced 2022)
- Awards: Pride of Performance Award by the President of Pakistan (2009)

Rasheed Naz (9 September 1948 – 17 January 2022) was a Pakistani film and television actor. He started his television career in 1971 in a Pashto television play and went on to work in several Pashto, Hindko and Urdu-language plays.

== Early life ==
Rasheed Naz was born on 9 September 1948 in Peshawar, NWFP (now Khyber Pakhtunkhwa), Pakistan.

== Career ==
Rasheed Naz's acting career spanned nearly five decades.

=== Television ===
In 1971, he started his television career as an actor in a Pashto television play. His first Urdu play was Aik Tha Gaoon (1973). His first popular play was Namoos. He also worked in Pakistan's first private television play Dasht, telecast on NTM TV channel. Rasheed Naz also worked in a Shoaib Mansoor's video song "Ishq Mohabbat Apna Pan" with Iman Ali.

=== Cinema ===
In 1988, he worked in his first Pashto film Zama Jang (English: "My War"). His first Urdu film was Syed Noor's Dakait ("Dacoit"). He also worked in Shoaib Mansoor's 2007 film Khuda Ke Liye ("For God's Sake"). Raheed Naz also starred in the Bollywood film Baby in 2015 alongside Akshay Kumar, Anupam Kher, and Madhurima Tuli.

== Death ==
Rasheed Naz died in Islamabad, Pakistan on 17 January 2022 at the age of 73. He had been suffering from health issues for some time. He was buried in Peshawar, the city of his birth.

== Personal life ==
His son Hasan Noman is an actor as well. Noman, who shared the screen with Rasheed Naz in Baby, was married to actress Madiha Rizvi from 2013 to 2022.

== Awards and recognition ==
- Pride of Performance Award by the Government of Pakistan for his services as television and film actor.

== Notable television plays ==
- Teri Rah Mein Rul Gaye
- Sabith Ali
- Namoos
- Dasht
- Dosra Asman
- Ghulam Gardish (PTV)
- Manzil
- Pinjra
- "Phir Kab Milo Gay"
- "Angoori"
- "Anokhi"
- "Khushi Ek Roag"
- "Khuda Zameen Se Gaya Nahi Hai"
- "Saiban Sheshay ka"
- "Pathar"
- "Aann"
- "Apnay Huay Paraye"
- "Angels"
- "Inkaar"
- "Tawan" (Pashto)
- "Hum Pe Jo Guzarti Hay"
- Dayar-e-Dil
- "Khwab Saraye" as Abrar Khan

== Filmography ==
| Year | Title | Role | Language | Notes |
|---|---|---|---|---|
| 1988 | Zama Jang | | Pashto | |
| 2001 | Dakait | | Punjabi | |
| 2003 | Larki Punjaban | | Urdu | |
| 2003 | Qayamat – A Love Triangle In Afghanistan | | Urdu | |
| 2007 | Khuda Ke Liye | Maulana Tahiri | Urdu | |
| 2008 | Kashf (The Lifting of the Veil) | Sufi Pir | Urdu | |
| 2009 | Kandahar Break | Ashiq Khan | English | |
| 2012 | Arman | Khan sahab | Pashto | |
| 2015 | Baby | Maulana Mohammad Abdul Rahman | Hindi | Main antagonist; based on Hafiz Saeed |
| 2015 | Karachi se Lahore | Khan Sahib | Urdu | |
| 2017 | Gul E Jana | | Pashto | |
| 2017 | Pari | | Urdu | |
| 2017 | Verna | | Urdu | |
| 2022 | Zarrar | Fahimullah Khan | Urdu | |
| 2023 | Dhai Chaal | | Urdu | |
| 2023 | 72 Hoorain | Maulvi | Hindi | Posthumous |

== See also ==
- List of Pakistani actors
