= Asim Abbasi =

British-Pakistani film director, writer, and producer

- Born: Karachi, Pakistan
- Education: Karachi Grammar School; London School of Economics; SOAS
- Occupations: Director, Writer, Producer
- Years active: 2012–present
- Website: www.asimabbasi.com

Asim Abbasi is a Pakistani-British film director, screenwriter and producer who also has his own production company, Indus Talkies.

== Career ==
In 2012, he made the short film Anathema. In 2013, he made two more short films, Once A Man and Whore. Two years later, he made his fourth short film named Little Red Roses. All four were shot in the United Kingdom.

In 2018, Abbasi's first feature film, Cake, was lauded by critics. The Guardian's Mike McCahill wrote "Uncommonly alert to small, telling details, while more expansive in its attitudes, the result proves far richer and worldlier than anything previously observed coming down the Khyber Pass." Cake was also selected to be Pakistan's submission to the 91st Academy Awards for best Foreign Language Film.

In 2020, Abbasi further established himself as a writer and director with his critically acclaimed web series, Churails (witches), which was hailed as a radically progressive shift from the mainstream narrative of Pakistani television.

In 2026, Abbasi directed episodes six through ten of the acclaimed BBC One television series The Other Bennet Sister.

== Filmography ==
=== Films ===
Year	Film	Director	Producer	Writer	Notes
2012	Anathema	Yes	Yes	Yes	Short film
2013	Once A Man	Yes	Yes	Yes	Short film
2013	Whore	Yes	Yes	Yes	Short film
2015	Little Red Roses	Yes	Yes	Yes	Short film
2018	Cake	Yes	Yes	Yes	Debut as film director

=== Web series ===
Year	Title	Role	Notes
2020	Churails	Director/Producer/Writer	Web Series on ZEE5 and Zindagi
2024	Barzakh	Director/Producer/Writer	Web Series on ZEE5 and Zindagi

=== Television ===
Year	Title	Role	Notes
2026	The Other Bennet Sister	Director (5 episodes)	Television series on BBC One

== Awards and nominations ==
Year	Award	Category	Nominated work	Result	Ref(s)
2018	London Asian Film Festival	Best Director	Cake	Won	
2019	18th Lux Style Awards	Best Director	Cake	Nominated	
