= Hajra Khan (actress) =

Pakistani actress

- Born: Quetta, Balochistan, Pakistan
- Occupation: Actress
- Years active: 2011–present

Hajra Khan is a Pakistani television and film actress, writer and filmmaker. She made her debut in film with the 2018 movie Pinky Memsaab. Her debut TV series Buri Aurat aired on Geo TV in 2010. She has written a memoir, Where the Opium Grows. She is the producer of the film Floating Birds.

== Personal life ==
Khan was born in Quetta to a Pashtun family. She studied Business Management at the Dublin Business College, Ireland.

== Filmography ==
=== Film ===
Year	Title	Role	Notes
2018	Pinky Memsaab	Kulsoom	

=== Television ===
Year	Title	Role	Network	Ref(s)
2010	Dolly Ki Ayegi Baraat	Malka Rani	Geo Entertainment	
2010	Buri Aurat	Chut Bin Nisha	Geo TV	
2011	Nawabzadiyan		Geo TV	
2011	Parizad		Geo TV	
2012	Jahez	Roshaney	Geo Entertainment	
2013	Teesri Manzil		A-Plus TV	
2014	Marasim	Almas	A-Plus TV	
2016	Sangdil	Suhaina	Geo Entertainment	
2016	Laaj		Hum TV	
2016	Bay Khudi	Faiza	ARY Digital	
2016	Mann Mayal	Naureen; Minahil's aunt	Hum TV	
2016-17	Faltu Larki	Anwer	A-Plus TV	
2017	To Dil Ka Kya Hua	Maya and Lubna's friend	Hum TV	
2017	Saaya	Shela	Geo Entertainment	
2017	Laut Ke Chalay Aana	Naseem	Geo TV	
2018	Khasara	Arzoo	ARY Digital	
2019	Ishq Zahe Naseeb	Zakia	Hum TV	
2019	Surkh Chandni	Aadia's lawyer	ARY Digital	
2020	Mein Jeena Chahti Hoon	Rabia	Express Entertainment	
2020	Kashf	Aisha; Kashf's Aunt	Hum TV	
2022	Pehchaan	Fareeha	Hum TV	
2022	Wehem	Naseem	Hum TV	
