= Aamina Sheikh =

Pakistani actress (born 1981)

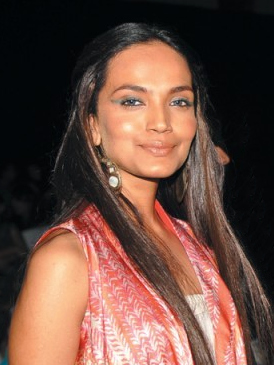
- Sheikh in 2016
- Born: 28 August 1981 (age 45); New York, United States
- Education: Hampshire College
- Occupation: Actress
- Years active: 2007–present
- Spouse: Omer Farooqi (m. 2020)
- Children: 2

Aamina Sheikh (Urdu: آمنہ شیخ) is an American-Pakistani actress, songwriter and former fashion model. Sheikh has received critical appreciation for her acting prowess, and has won four Lux Style Awards from nine nominations.

Born in New York City and raised in Karachi and Riyadh, Sheikh studied video production at Hampshire College. After working as an assistant at Curious Pictures, she returned to Pakistan and started her career as a fashion model, during which she was a spokesperson for the French brand L'Oreal and received a Lux Style Award for Best Model nomination. She then featured as the female lead in the 2008 telefilm Baarish Mein Deewar and the Geo TV series Dil-e-Nadan. Sheikh had roles in television productions, including Daam (2010), Maat (2010), Uraan (2010), Mera Saaein (2010), Main Abdul Qadir Hoon (2010), Mera Saaein 2 (2012), Mirat Ul Uroos (2013) and Jackson Heights (2014).

Sheikh made her film debut with the 2012 acclaimed social drama Seedlings. Her performance in the film garnered critical appreciation and earned her many national and international awards, including the Lux Style Award for Best Film Actress, New York Film Festival Award and SAARC Film Festival Award. She achieved further success with her portrayal in the social drama Josh: Independence Through Unity (2014), a critical and commercial success. Sheikh was widely praised for her role and received nominations in the Best Actress category at the Lux Style Awards and the Silent River Film Festival. Her greatest commercial success came with the family drama Cake (2018). In 2015, she served as one of the committee members of the Pakistani Academy Selection Committee.

== Personal life ==
She is an ethnic Sindhi. Sheikh married actor Mohib Mirza in Karachi in 2005. Mirza and Sheikh met on the set of a show which Mirza was hosting and she was directing. In an interview to Jang, Mirza revealed he had a difficult time convincing Sheikh's father to accept his plans for marriage. Mirza and Sheikh have a daughter, Meissa, born in 2015. The couple announced their separation in 2018 and divorced in 2019. Sheikh remarried to a businessman, Omer Farooqi, in August 2020, and the couple have a son, named Issa, born in 2021.

== Career ==
After returning to Pakistan, Sheikh landed a job with Geo Entertainment, where she directed and produced the children talk show, called Bachey Man Ke Sachey. In 2007, Sheikh made her on-screen debut in Sharjil Baloch and Khalid Ahmed's telefilm, Gurmukh Singh ki Waseeyat. It was based on Saadat Hassan Manto's short story, The Will of Gurmukh Singh. Centered on the events after the partition of India, Sheikh played Sughra, the member of a traumatised family who have left alone in a predominantly Sikh neighborhood. She subsequently garnered international recognition as a spokesperson for the French beauty brand L'Oreal.

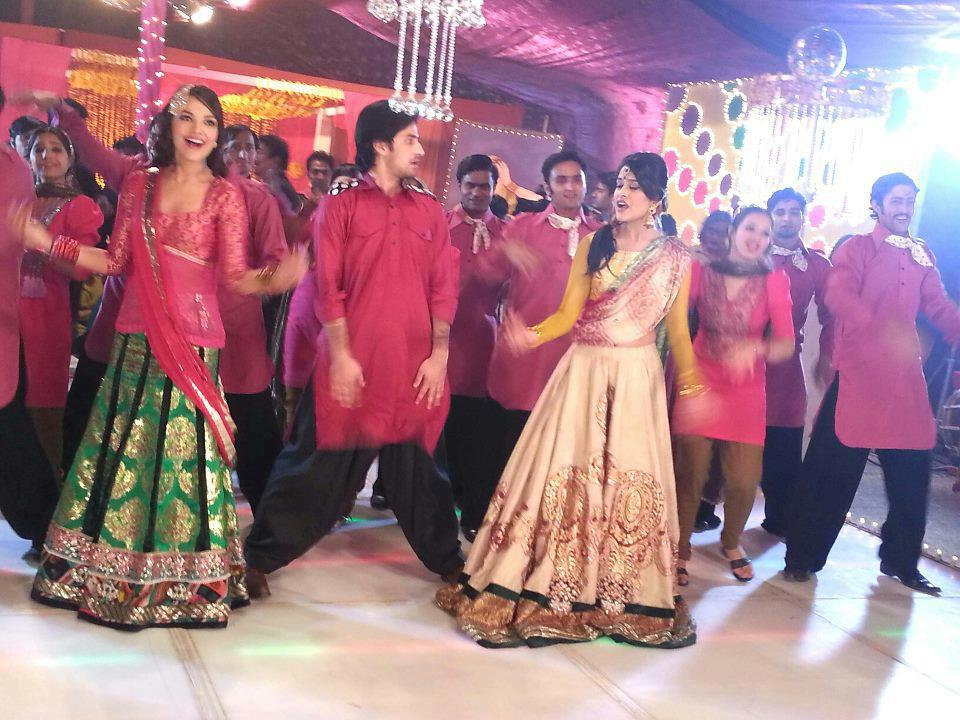
Sheikh performing the song "Ko Ko Korina" in 2013 (on the left most).

In 2008, Sheikh appeared in three major telefilms: Aasmaan Chu Lay, Pachees Qadam Pe Maut and Baarish Mein Deewar. Sheikh played a rickshaw driver who's determined to become the sole breadwinner of the family, in Syed Ali Raza Usama's "Aasmaan Chu Lay". Sheikh had to learn and drive a rickshaw on Karachi's busiest M. A. Jinnah Road and Garden Area, with a massive camera attached to it and had to attract real passengers. In the same year, Sheikh made her runaway debut with Rehana Saigol's fashion show. She has done extensive print work for fashion designers, such as Deepak Perwani, Amir Adnan, Nomi Ansari, Niche Lifestyle, Khaadi, Teejays, The Men's Store, Fahad Hussayn, Hang Ten, Maheen Khan, Umbereen Sharmeen, Chinyere, Crossroads and Limited Edition. In the following year, she did her second photoshoot for Niche Lifestyle, with Atif Aslam. Her appeared in the romantic series Agar Tum Na Hote in 2009. In 2010, Sheikh returned to telefilms depicted the titular role of an enthusiastic athlete based on Naseem Hameed in the biographical-drama Bhaag Amina Bhaag.

Sheikh played an unprivileged Sunni girl coping with the obstacles of her court marriage to his Shia classmate in the drama Ek Hatheli Pe Hina Ek Hatheli Pe Lahoo.

In 2012, Sheikh played the titular religiously inclined lower middle-class girl who eventually becomes a famous singer in the drama Umm-e-Kulsoom. Sheikh was praised for her performance, and received a nomination of Best TV Actress - Satellite at the 11th Lux Style Awards. In 2013, she played the lead in the drama Kuch Is Tarah. The performance earned her a nomination of Best TV Actress - Terrestrial at the 13th Lux Style Awards. She achieved further critical and commercial success for her role of portrayal of Zarnab, in the romance Armaan (2013), which earned her a nomination for the Tarang Housefull Award for Best Actress.

In 2013, Sheikh played the role of a grieving mother in Summer Nicks-produced multi award-winning feature film Seedlings and went on to win New York Film Festival Award for Best Actress and SAARC Film Festival Award for Best Actress. She then went on to play the lead in Iram Parveen Bilal's feature art film Josh: Independence Through Unity, before taking on the role of Natasha in the high-octane action spy thriller, 021, produced by Zeba Bakhtiar and directed by Australian filmmaker, Summer Nicks. In 2013, Sheikh was awarded Miss Photogenic Award at the Veet Celebration of Beauty Awards.

In 2016, she played the titular submissive painter housewife in the drama Pakeezah. Due to the unoriginality of the role and the fear of typecasting, Sheikh was initially hesitant to take it and expressed feeling pressured to fulfill others' expectations rather than pursuing her own artistic aspirations.

In 2018, she starred in Asim Abbasi's drama film Cake, alongside Sanam Saeed, which was a major critical and commercial success. While praising her performance, along with Saeed's, The Guardian wrote that they, "rank first among equals in an assured ensemble.", while, The Daily Times-based reviewer found that she "amalgamated Zarine’s character really well and made it look believable on screen." The film earned her a Best Actress nomination at the Lux Style Awards.

In 2025, Sheikh returned to television with the portrayal of an upright and talented lawyer of a rape survivor in the crime-drama Case No. 9.

== Filmography ==
=== Films ===
Year	Title	Role	Notes
2011	Love Mein Ghum	Herself	Special appearance in song "Love Mein Ghum"
2013	Seedlings	Maliha	
2013	Josh: Independence Through Unity	Fatima	
2013	Armaan	Zarnab	
2014	O21	Natasha	
2015	Good Morning Karachi	Mehwish	Cameo appearance
2018	Cake	Zareen	
2019	Heer Maan Ja	Saba	Cameo appearance

=== Television ===
Year	Title	Role	Channel	Notes
2007	Partition Stories	Sughra	PTV Home	Episode "Gurmukh Singh Ki Wasiyat"
2008	Wilco	Megha	PTV Home	
2008	Qisson Ki Chadar	Aimen	Hum TV	Episode: "Tum Aurat Mein Mard"
2008	Wapsi		ARY Digital	Telefilm
2008	Mera Naam Hai Muhabbat	Huma	Geo TV	Episode: "Ashiq Pan Shop"
	Boltay Afsanay	Razia	TVOne Global	Episode: "Daayin"
2009	Dil-e-Nadan	Seema	Geo TV	
2009	Agar Tum Na Hotay	Shireen	Indus Vision	
2009	Qisson Ki Chadar	Hajra	Hum TV	Episode: "Ghutan"
2010	Haal-e-Dil	Seerat	ARY Digital	
2010	Daam	Maliha	ARY Digital	
2010	Bhaag Amina Bhaag	Amina	Geo TV	
2010	Saleena	Bushra	ATV	
2010	Tere Liye	Simran	ARY Digital	
2010	Ishq Gumshuda	Neha	Hum TV	
2010	Hum Tum	Ammal	Geo Entertainment	
2010	Uraan	Sana	Geo Entertainment	
2010	Mera Saaein	Naina Wajahat	ARY Digital	
2010	Main Abdul Qadir Hoon	Nell	Hum TV	
2011	Maat	Aiman	Hum TV	
2011	Umm-e-Kulsoom	Umm-e-Kulsoom	ARY Digital	
2011	Kuch Kami Si Hai	Asmee	Geo Entertainment	
2011	Mora Piya	Ujala	Geo Entertainment	
2011	Ek Hatheli Pe Hina Ek Hatheli Pe Lahoo	Hijab	Geo Entertainment	
2012	Mera Saaein 2	Naina Wajahat	ARY Digital	
2013–12	Mirat Ul Uroos	Aiza	Geo TV	
2013	Silvatein	Zaib	ARY Digital	
2013	Kitni Girhain Baaki Hain	Anoushay	Hum TV	Episode: "Gunhagar Dil"
2013	Kuch Is Tarah	Alizeh	PTV Home	
2014	Jackson Heights	Salma	Urdu 1	
2016	Pakeezah	Pakeeza	Hum TV	
2017	Khudgarz	Ayera	ARY Digital	
2018	Nibah	Sofia	ARY Digital	
2025	Case No. 9	Beenish Ali	Geo Entertainment	

== Awards and nominations ==
Year	Title	Award	Category	Result	
2012	Seedlings	New York Film Festival Awards	Best Performance by an Actress	Won	
2012	Seedlings	SAARC Film Festival Awards	Best Actress in a Leading Role	Won	
2013	Armaan	Tarang Housefull Awards	Best On Screen Couple with Fawad Khan	Won	
2013	Armaan	Tarang Housefull Awards	Best Actress	Nominated	
2013		Veet Celebration of Beauty Awards	Miss Photogenic	Won	
2013	Maat	Hum Awards	Best Actress	Nominated	
2013	Seedlings	Pakistan Media Awards	Best Film Actress	Nominated	
2013	Josh: Independence Through Unity	Pakistan Media Awards	Best Film Actress	Won	
2013	Josh: Independence Through Unity	Silent River Film Festival	Best Actress	Won	
2014	Seedlings	ARY Film Awards	BestActress	Nominated	
2014	Seedlings	ARY Film Awards	Best Star Debut Female	Nominated	
2015	021	Tribune Cine Awards	Best Supporting Actress	Won	
2017	021	Pakeezah	Hum Awards	Best Actress	Nominated
2019	Cake	Galaxy Lollywood Awards	Best Actor in a Leading Role Female	Nominated	

=== Lux Style Awards ===
Ceremony	Category	Project	Result
2009	Best Emerging Talent in Fashion	—N/a	Won
2010	Best Model of the Year (female)	—N/a	Nominated
2011	Best Dress Female	—N/a	Won
2011	Best Television Actress - Satellite	Agar Tum Na Hotay	Nominated
2012	Best Television Actress - Satellite	Umm-e-Kulsoom	Nominated
2014	Best Television Actress - Terrestrial	Kuch Is Tarah	Nominated
2014	Best Dress Female	—N/a	Won
2014	Best Film Actress	Josh: Independence Through Unity	Nominated
2014	Best Film Actress	Seedlings	Won
2019	Best Film Actress	Cake	Nominated

== See also ==
- List of Pakistani actresses
