= Maria Memon =

Pakistani TV journalist and newscaster

- Born: Karachi, Sindh, Pakistan
- Occupation: TV newscaster/News Anchor
- Years active: 2008 - present
- Employer: ARY News (2015-present)
- Website: mariamemon.com

Maria Memon (Urdu: ماریہ میمن) is a Pakistani newscaster, currently working as an anchor for ARY News.

== Career ==
She made her Lollywood debut with the animated film Tick Tock. She worked as a voice-over artist in an animated film Tick Tock with other Pakistani actors including Ahsan Khan and Ghulam Mohiuddin.

Originally she joined Geo TV as a program coordinator, but the project got shelved and her management shifted her to the newsroom and thus Maria began her journey as an anchor/reporter. She intended to work on social topics throughout her career. Her position allowed her to reach a large audience and discuss various social and environmental issues.

== Personal life ==
In May 2020, Maria Memon tested positive for Coronavirus disease 2019 and stated that she only had mild symptoms but decided to keep herself isolated. She was quoted as saying, "It is very important to discourage social stigma related to COVID. Be socially responsible. Isolate, get tested and let people know your condition."
