= Zeb Bangash =

Zeb-un-Nisa Bangash
- Born: Zebunisa Bangash; Kohat, Khyber Pakhtunkhwa, Pakistan
- Education: Smith College; Mount Holyoke College
- Occupation: Singer-songwriter
- Relatives: Haniya Aslam (cousin)
- Musical career
- Genres: Pop, Sufi
- Years active: 2007–present
- Labels: Fire Records, Coke Studio

Zebunisa Bangash (Urdu: زیب النسا), better known as Zeb Bangash (Urdu: زیب بنگش), is a Pakistani singer-songwriter from Lahore, Punjab celebrated for her soulful vocals, versatility, and contributions to the South Asian indie and mainstream music scenes. Her family originally comes from Khyber Pakhtunkhwa. Apart from her solo career, she was a member of the music group Zeb and Haniya along with Haniya Aslam, her first cousin.

She has been active since 2008 and is the first Pakistani artist to work as a music director for a Bollywood movie, the 2016 dark comedy movie Lipstick Under My Burkha, which received 18 film awards. She has built a highly distinct identity as a cross-cultural vocalist and recorded songs in Urdu, Pashto, Punjabi, Turkish, Persian, Saraiki, Hindko and Kashmiri. She has often been seen on the Pakistani television shows Coke Studio, Pakistan Idol, and, Pepsi Battle of the Bands.

== Career ==
Zebunisa Bangash began her career with her cousin Haniya Aslam as Zeb and Haniya. They released their debut album Chup! in 2008. In 2013, Zeb did a song for the film Madras Cafe, making her debut in Bollywood. She continued her solo career after Haniya left to study in Canada. She sang for the soundtrack of Highway (2014), Bin Roye (2015), Manto (2015), Ho Mann Jahaan (2016), Fitoor (2016), Lala Begum (2016), Verna (2017), Parwaaz Hai Junoon (2018), Baaji (2019), Parey Hut Love (2019), Superstar (2019) and Kamli (2022). She also made a cameo appearance as Xenovia in Ho Mann Jahaan, and appeared as the party singer in the video for "Shaam Nasheeli" from Baaji. She also sang the title track of television series Diyar-e-Dil which won Lux Style Award for Best Original Soundtrack and the Hum Award for Best Original Soundtrack in 2016.

She has sung several songs for Coke Studio, including Paimona, Chup, Chal Diyay, Bibi Sanam Janem, and Tann Dolay. She then also performed a single in the second season of Pepsi Battle of the Bands. In 2019, she performed "Roshe", a Kashmiri ode to loss in Coke Studio Pakistan season 12.

Zeb Bangash is the first Pakistani artist to serve as music director of an award-winning Bollywood film. She is part of the Brooklyn-based ensemble Sandaraa, with the klezmer clarinetist/composer Michael Winograd and a number of other leading Brooklyn-based musicians. In 2026, she served as one of the judges on the second season of Pakistan Idol, alongside Fawad Khan, Rahat Fateh Ali Khan, and Bilal Maqsood.

Following the death of Haniya Aslam in August 2024, Bangash paid tribute to her cousin and former bandmate, remembering her as "the most brilliant, God-gifted musician". She reflected on the legacy of Zeb and Haniya, stating that Haniya was the "wind beneath my wings" and that the duo's music continues to resonate with listeners.

== Personal life ==
Zeb was born in Kohat, Khyber Pakhtunkhwa, and is of ethnic Pashtun heritage. She is the first cousin of the late Haniya Aslam, with whom she formed the musical duo Zeb and Haniya. She studied at Mount Holyoke College and Smith College in Massachusetts, earning a degree in Economics and History of Art. She married a US-based psychiatrist on 5 November 2017 in an intimate ceremony in Lahore; because her husband was completing his residency at Duke University at the time, the couple exchanged their vows over Skype.

== Discography ==
=== Soundtracks ===
Year	Name	Song	Co-singer	Notes
Films
2013	Madras Cafe	"Ajnabi"		Bollywood debut
2014	Highway	"Sooha Saaha"	Alia Bhatt	
2015	Bin Roye	"Maula Maula"	Abida Parveen	
2015	Manto	"Kya Hoga"	Ali Sethi	
2016	Ho Mann Jahaan	"Mann Ke Jahan"		
2016	Ho Mann Jahaan	"Dil Pagla"		
2016	Ho Mann Jahaan	"Dosti"	Zoheb Hassan	
2016	Fitoor	"Haminastu"		
2016	Fitoor	"Hone Do Batiyaan"	Nandini Srikar	
2016	Lala Begum	"Lala"	with Haniya Aslam (as Zeb and Haniya)	Short film
2017	Verna	"Sambhal Sambhal Kay"	Richie Robinson	
2017	Verna	"Khushi Ki Baat"	Haroon Shahid	
2018	Parwaaz Hai Junoon	"Naache Re"	Jabar Abbas	
2019	Baaji	"Shaam Nasheeli"	Saad Sultan	
2019	Baaji	"Ik Tu"	Saad Sultan	
2019	Baaji	"Khilti Kali"	Taha Malik	
2019	Baaji	"Badlaan"	Saad Sultan	
2019	Parey Hut Love	"Morey Saiyan"		
2019	Superstar	"Bekaraan"	Ali Sethi	
2022	Kamli	"Aag"	Amna Rahi, Farah Naz, Shamim Akhtar	
2022	Kamli	"Kaash"	Sohail Shahzad	
2024	Rautu Ka Raaz	"Tere Bina Batiya"	Shafqat Amanat Ali	
2025	Vadakkan	"Rang Likha"		Malayalam film
2026	Mango Jutt	"Mein hoi Dawandol"		Punjabi film
Television
2010	Daam	"Daam Tha"	with Haniya Aslam (as Zeb and Haniya)	ARY Digital
2013	Behadd	"Chal Diye"	with Haniya Aslam (as Zeb and Haniya)	Hum TV
2015	Tum Mere Paas Raho	"Tum Mere Paas Raho"		Hum TV
2015	Diyar-e-Dil	"Yaar-e-Mann"	Momim Durrani	Hum TV
2016	Ek Thi Marium	"Pankh Laga Ke"		telefilm title track
2016	Kösem Sultan	"Kösem Sultan"		Urdu 1
2017	Sammi	"Jag Khed'da Phire"	Zaheer Abbas	Hum TV
2018	Noor ul Ain	"Dil Ko Bhoolay"	Ali Sethi	Ary Digital
2018	Kaisa Hai Naseeban	"Kaisa Hai Naseeban"		Ary Digital
2020	Dulhan	"Kya O Mein Dulhan"		Hum TV
2021	Sinf-e-Aahan	"Sinf-e-Aahan"	Asim Azhar	Ary Digital
2022	Meray Humnasheen	"Meray Humnasheen"		Geo Entertainment
2023	Serial Killer	"Kahani"		Green Entertainment
2024	Khaie	"Parwardigara"		Geo Entertainment
2026	Doctor Bahu	"Mil Hi lo"	Faisal Kapadia	Ary Digital
2026	Hurmat	"Khud Se Kyun Dooriyan"	Sami Khan	Hum TV

=== Singles and Coke Studio appearances ===
Year	Album / Show	Song	Notes
2009	Coke Studio Season 2	"Paimona"	with Haniya Aslam (as Zeb and Haniya)
2009	Coke Studio Season 2	"Chup"	with Haniya Aslam (as Zeb and Haniya)
2009	Coke Studio Season 2	"Chal Diyay"	with Haniya Aslam and Javed Bashir
2009	Coke Studio Season 2	"Rona Chor Diya"	with Haniya Aslam and Javed Bashir
2010	Coke Studio Season 3	"Bibi Sanam Janem"	with Haniya Aslam (as Zeb and Haniya)
2010	Coke Studio Season 3	"Tann Dolay"	with Haniya Aslam and Noori
2010	Coke Studio Season 3	"Nazaar Eyle"	with Haniya Aslam (as Zeb and Haniya)
2013	Coke Studio Season 6	"Laili Jaan"	with Haniya Aslam (as Zeb and Haniya)
2016	Coke Studio Season 9	"Aja Re Moray Saiyaan"	with Noori
2016	Coke Studio Season 9	"Dilruba Na Raazi"	with Faakhir
2017	Pepsi Battle of the Bands	"Sureela Samundar"	
2019	Coke Studio Season 12	"Roshe"	a Kashmiri ode to loss
2019	Chan Kithan	"Chan Kithan"	Released by Zeb Bangash Music; Punjabi single
2021	Lamha	"Lamha"	with Asad Ul Haq; commercial jingle for Peek Freans Pik ("Banao Har Lamha Khaas")
2022	Shireen Guftaar Daari	"Shireen Guftaar Daari"	with Shamali Afghan; Persian folk song
2022	Saafhawa Haq Humara	"Saafhawa Haq Humara"	with Shantanu Moitra; clean air anthem for Sustainable World Inc.
2022	Dil Ki Baat	"Dil Ki Baat"	featuring Saad Sultan; 7up Pakistan
2024	Coke Studio Season 15	"Mehmaan"	with Nizam Torwali & Noorima Rehan

== Awards and nominations ==
Year	Nominee / work	Award	Result	Ref.
Lux Style Awards
2016	"Kya Hoga" – Manto	Best Female Playback	Nominated	
2016	"Yar-e-Mann" – Diyar-e-Dil	Best OST	Won	
2017	"Dil Pagla" – Ho Mann Jahaan	Best Singer (Female)	Nominated	
2020	"Gudi Wang" – Baaji	Best Playback Singer (Film)	Nominated	
2020	"Kaisa Hai Naseeba" – Kaisa Hai Naseeban	Best Original Soundtrack (TV)	Nominated	
Hum Awards
2016	"Yar-e-Mann" – Diyar-e-Dil	Hum Award for Best Original Soundtrack	Won	

== See also ==
- Zeb and Haniya
- Haniya Aslam
- Chup!
