= Syed Mohammad Ahmed =

Pakistani screenwriter, lyricist, actor, and director

Mohammad Ahmed
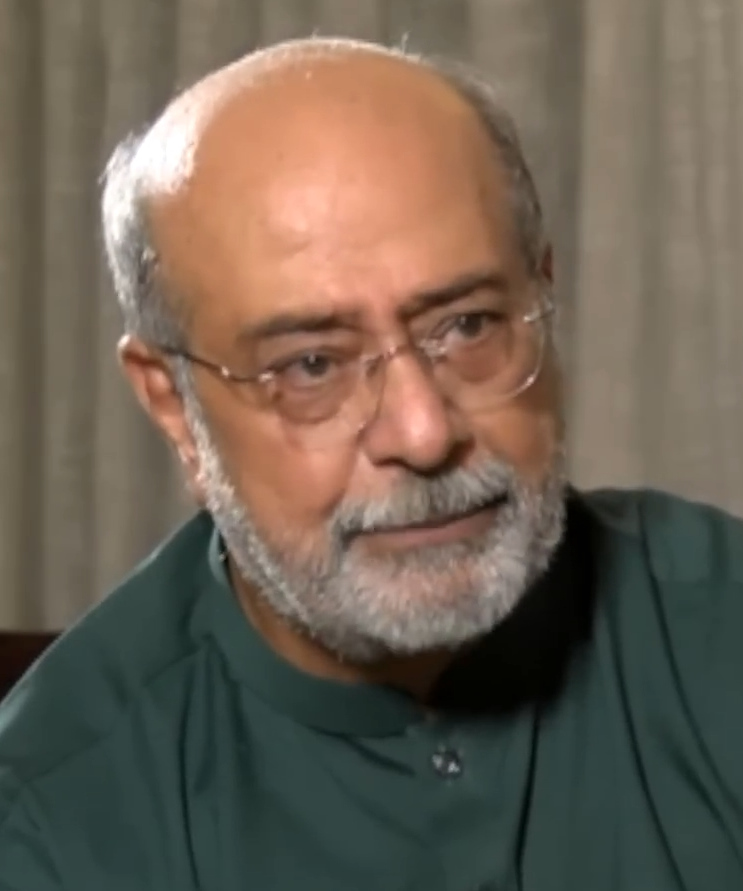
- Ahmed in 2020
- Born: 8 March 1957 (age 69); Karachi, Sindh, Pakistan
- Occupations: Director, actor, screenwriter
- Years active: 1980–present
- Notable work: Mystery Theater, Tanhaiyan Naye Silsilay, Ramchand Pakistani, Tere Bin Laden

Syed Mohammad Ahmed, frequently credited as Mohammad Ahmed, is a Pakistani screenwriter, lyricist, actor, and director. He is best known for Mystery Theater, Badtameez, Tum Se Kehna Tha, Shaista Shaista, Azar Ki Ayegi Baraat, Annie Ki Ayegi Baraat, Tanhaiyan Naye Silsilay, Dareecha, Goya, and many other series and telefilms such as Khamoshi, Ghoongat and Ramchand Pakistani. His appearance as Shah Jahan/Agha Jan in Suno Chanda was praised by critics, and he went on to reprise his role in the sequel Suno Chanda 2. He has written dialogue for the Indian movie Tere Bin Laden, and has written screenplays for several television series. In 2019, he received a nomination for Best Actor for his role in the 2018 film Cake, at the 18th Lux Style Awards.

== Career ==
Ahmed's first original script for the screen was of the tele-play Rahne Do, the tale of a famous actress around the time of partition. He wrote the script of his first serial Tum Se Kehna Tha which aired on PTV in 1995. He wrote the romantic-comedy Azar Ki Ayegi Baraat centered around the wedding of the protagonist, aired in 2009, and considered it as his most popular work. In 2011, his serial the mystery Dareecha on-aired, and for the series he was asked to write about the women suffering and plights but he infused the "mystery" element in it.

Desi Rants n Raves wrote "Mohammed Ahmed is a seasoned writer and his flair for penning relatable and real stories is on full display in most of his work. With no black or white extremes, a simple story on the surface, his script appears to have layers of meaning embedded within crisp and meaningful dialogues."

He returned to acting with the family-drama film Cake. He has also acted in various drama series including Ehd E Wafa, Suno Chanda, Mere Paas Tum Ho, Aulaad and Sabaat. His performance in these series has received praise from viewers and critics.

== Filmography ==
=== Films ===
Year	Title	Director	Notes	Ref(s)
2008	Ramchand Pakistani	Mehreen Jabbar	Writer	Laal Kabootar
2010	Tere Bin Laden	Abhishek Sharma	Writer	
2016	Lala Begum	Mehreen Jabbar	Writer and actor	
2017	Mehrunisa V Lub U	Yasir Nawaz	Actor	
2017	Punjab Nahi Jaungi	Nadeem Baig	Special appearance	
2018	Cake	Asim Abbasi	Actor	
2019	Laal Kabootar	Kamal Khan	Actor	

=== Television ===
Year	Title	Character	Director(s)	Notes	Ref(s)
2008	Shaista Shaista				
2008	Doraha	Sara's father	Mehreen Jabbar		
2010	Dolly Ki Ayegi Baraat	Nabeel's father	Nadeem Baig		
2011	Daam	Sami	Mehreen Jabbar		
2012	Annie Ki Ayegi Baraat	Nabeel's father	Marina Khan, Nadeem Baig		
2012	Durr-e-Shehwar	Sami	Haissam Hussain		
2012	Coke Kahani	Mutmain	Mehreen Jabbar		
2013	Ghoonghat	Lateef	Mehreen Jabbar	Telefilm	
2017	Dhund	Nana Syed	Farrukh Faiz		
2018	Nibah	Sofia's father	Aabis Raza		
2018	Suno Chanda	Shah Jahan "Agha Jaan"	Aehsun Talish		
2018	Hum Chale Aaye	Sila's father	Mehreen Jabbar	Telefilm	
2018	Dilara	Akbar Ali	Khalid Ahmed		
2019	Suno Chanda 2	Shah Jahan "Agha Jaan"	Aehsun Talish		
2019	Deewar-e-Shab	Ustaad Faraghat Baig	Iqbal Hussain		
2019	Meray Paas Tum Ho	Mateen	Nadeem Baig		
2019	Rishtay Biktay Hain	Sharafat	Syed Atif Hussain Shah		
2019	Ruswai	Mehmood	Rubina Ashraf		
2019	Ehd-e-Wafa	Malik Allahyar	Saife Hassan		
2019	Yeh Dil Mera	Dr. Arslan	Aehsun Talish		
2020	Sabaat	Aziz Ahmad	Shahzad Kashmiri		
2020	Jalan	Tanveer	Aabis Raza		
2020	Dulhan	Amal's father	Adeel Siddiqi		
2020	Aulaad	Jalaal Ahmed	Aabis Raza		
2020	Ek Jhoothi Love Story		Mehreen Jabbar	Web-Series	
2021	Dikhawa		Ali Akbar	Episode: "Zid"	
2021	Neeli Zinda Hai	Faheem	Qasim Ali Mureed		
2021	Pardes	Sadeeq	Marina Khan		
2021	Parizaad	Mirza Sahab	Shahzad Kashmiri		
2021	Qissa Meherbano Ka	Asghar Ali Mehtab	Iqbal Hussain		
2021	Sinf-e-Aahan	Arzoo's father	Nadeem Baig		
2021	Khaab Toot Jaatay Hain	Police Chief	Mohammed Ehteshamuddin		
2022	Hum Tum	Safiullah aka Daddu Handsome	Danish Nawaz		
2022	Dikhawa (season 3)	Ali Akbar	Episode: "Jhoot"		
2022	Pehchaan	Adnan's father	Asad Jabal		
2022	Betiyaan	Naeem	Meesam Naqvi		
2023	Kuch Ankahi	Agha Jaan	Nadeem Baig		
2023	Gumn	Sohail Baig	Sarmad Khoosat		
2024	Radd	Alam	Ahmed Bhatti		
2024	Zard Patton Ka Bunn	Nofil's father	Saife Hassan		
2024	Contractors	Rashid	Mehreen Jabbar	Eid special Mini Series, Writer Also	
2024	Sunn Mere Dil	Naamdar Mirza	Hasan Hasib		
2025	Judwaa	Nana Mia	Furqan Adam		
2025	Ek Jhooti Kahani	Habib Sahab	Shehrazade Sheikh		
2026	Doctor Bahu		Mehreen Jabbar		
2026	Maa	Saif	Ali Farhan Anchan		
2026	Bas Tera Saath Ho			Special appearance	

== Screenwriting ==
Year	Title	Director(s)	Other notes
1995	Tum Se Kehna Tha	Sahira Kazmi	
2000	Tum Hi To Ho	Marina Khan	
2002	Kahaniyaan	Mehreen Jabbar	
2005	Tere Siwa	Rubina Ashraf	
2009	Azar Ki Ayegi Baraat	Marina Khan	
2011	Badtameez	Rana Rizwan	
2011	Dareecha	Farrukh Faiz	
2012	Coke Kahani	Mehreen Jabbar	
2012	Tanhaiyan Naye Silsilay	Marina Khan	co-writer
2013	Ghoonghat	Mehreen Jabbar	Telefilm
2015	Goya	Farrukh Faiz	
2016	Teri Meri Jodi	Syed Ali Raza Usama	
2017	Dhund	Farrukh Faiz	
2017	Chanar Ghati	Syed Ghazanffar Ali	co-writer
2023	Kuch Ankahi	Nadeem Baig	
2024	Very Filmy	Ali Hassan	
2024	Contractors	Mehreen Jabbar	
