= Kaif-e-Baharan =

Pakistani television series

- Genre: Family drama
- Created by: Faysal Manzoor Khan
- Written by: Almas-ul-Ain Khalid
- Directed by: Nadeem Siddique
- Starring: Aiman Khan; Marina Khan; Huma Nawab; Ayesha Gul
- Country of origin: Pakistan
- Original language: Urdu
- No. of episodes: 25

Production
- Producer: Babar Javed
- Production location: Pakistan
- Running time: Approx 40 Minutes

Original release
- Network: Geo Entertainment
- Release: 25 February – 1 September 2018

Kaif-e-Baharan (Urdu: کیف بہاراں, lit. 'The Joy of Spring') is a 2018 Pakistani television serial that premiered on Geo Entertainment on 25 February 2018. It is produced by Babar Javed under A&B Entertainment. It stars Aiman Khan, Marina Khan and Huma Nawab, the latter two starred together in a series since Nijaat (1993) and Farar (1996).

== Plot ==
The drama revolves around a girl named Seerat Fatima who is left by her mother at the age of three and she is brought up by an addict father. Twenty three year old Fatima is now a school teacher with an ill father. Kamran is the son of Shaista who is a heart patient and single parent. She wishes to marry off her son to her niece Farwa despite Kamran's lack of interest in her. Kamran is attacked by a gangster mob and Fatima saves him by sending him to the hospital. Kamran looks for his saviour and finds Fatima. Shahnawaz is the gangster who attacked Kamran and is interested in marrying Fatima. Kamran falls in love with Fatima and marries her to protect her from Shahnawaz's clutches. Due to his mother's health condition he keeps his marriage and Fatima's pregnancy a secret from his family. Shahnawaz comes back with a vengeance and shoots Kamran. He forces Fatima to marry him by threatening her with the life of her newborn son and telling her that Kamran is dead. Kamran survives but Fatima is unaware of that. She runs away with her son. Shahnawaz kills her father and aunt in a fire and goes to jail. Kamran assumes Fatima is dead in the fire with her father. Kamran leaves his mother's home after learning that Shaista ruthlessly rejected Fatima's plea for help. Fatima, homeless and helpless, on the run faces a lot of troubles and attempts on her honour but with a twist of fate lands in the house of Kamran's mother. What will happen to Fatima and Kamran? Will they be able to find each other again? Who is Fatima's mother and will Fatima finally meet her mother or not?

== Cast ==
- Aiman Khan as Seerat Fatima
- Marina Khan as Shaista Fatima
- Muhammad Ali as Kamran
- Huma Nawab as Farah
- Mohsin Gilani as Azhar
- Jahanzeb Khan as Ahmer
- Asad Mehmood
- Malik Raza as Aleem Shahnawaz
- Dr.Ayesha Gul as Asma
- Faiza Ali as Farwa
- Talat Iqbal as Zubair
- Sana Humayun as Anila
