= Chup =

Chup may refer to:

- Chup!, a 2008 album by Zeb and Haniya
- Chup: Revenge of the Artist, a 2022 Indian film
