= Haniya Aslam =

Pakistani musician (1978- 2024)

- ہانیہ اسلم
- Born: Haniya Aslam; April 28, 1978; Karachi, Pakistan
- Died: August 11, 2024 (aged 46)
- Education: Smith College; NCA; SOAS
- Occupation: Musician
- Relatives: Zebunnisa Bangash
- Musical career
- Genres: Pop, Sufi
- Years active: 2007–2024
- Label: Fire Records (former)

Haniya Aslam (28 April 1978 – 11 August 2024) was a Pakistani musician. She first came to the public's attention as a member of the musical duo Zeb and Haniya along with her cousin Zebunnisa Bangash in 2007. In 2014 she left the group and moved to Canada for studies, and pursued a solo music career in Canada.

Later, she returned to Pakistan, becoming a successful musician, producer, engineer and composer, including for some of the country's leading music shows, such as Coke Studio.

She began her career as a studio intern for well-known Pakistani guitarist, producer and bandleader Mekaal Hasan. She also served as a co-author on one of the few in-depth histories of contemporary youth music in Pakistan.

Haniya died from cardiac arrest on 11 August 2024, at the age of 46.

== Filmography ==
Key
†	Denotes films that have not yet been released

Films
Year	Film	Role	Notes
2013	Madras Cafe	Collab with Shantanu Moitra	
2014	Highway	Ukulele and guitar for "Maahi Ve"	
2014	In Difference	composer	short film
2015	Loev	Soundtrack (Chal Diye)	
2016	Lala Begum	sound designer	short film
2016	Maypole Rose	sound recordist	short film
2016	Dobara Phir Se	Background score	debut

=== Television ===
Television
Year	Television Series	Role	Notes
2013	Behadd	performed the song Chal Diye	as Zeb and Haniya
2013	Coke Studio (season 6)	singer	as Zeb and Haniya
2009	Coke Studio (season 6)	singer	as Zeb and Haniya
2009	Nestlé Nesvita Women of Strength '09	guest	talk show

== Discography ==
=== Albums ===
Albums
Year	Album	Label	Notes
2008	Chup!	Fire Records	debut album as Zeb and Haniya
2011	Kya Khayal Hai	MTV India	single
