= Aye Ishq e Junoon =

- Aye Ishq e Junoon Launch Episode
- Genre: Thriller - Romantic
- Written by: Sadia Akhter
- Directed by: Qasim Ali Mureed
- Starring: Sheheryar Munawar, Ushna Shah
- Country of origin: Pakistan
- Original language: Urdu
- No. of seasons: 1
- No. of episodes: 35

Production
- Executive producer: Nadeem Baig
- Producer: Six Sigma Plus Productions - Humayun Saeed
- Editor: Zafar Ali Sodhar
- Running time: 35 - 40 minutes

Original release
- Network: ARY Digital
- Release: November 11, 2024 – March 10, 2025

Aye Ishq e Junoon is a romantic, thriller Pakistani television series directed by Qasim Ali Mureed, written by Sadia Akhter and produced by Six Sigma Plus Productions. It aired from November 11, 2024, to March 10, 2025, on ARY Digital, starring Sheheryar Munawar and Ushna Shah in the lead roles. The final episode of the series was broadcast on March 10, 2025.

== Plot ==
The narrative centers on Aiman, a diligent young woman from a lower-middle-class family who works tirelessly to support her ailing brother. Her life intersects with that of Rahim Nawaz, a responsible and mature individual managing his family's hotel business, and Shahroz, Rahim's spoiled and carefree brother.

A pivotal incident occurs when Shahroz harasses Aiman, an event that sets off a chain reaction affecting all involved. Rahim's internal struggle between family loyalty and moral integrity intensifies, especially as his mother, Afiya, consistently defends Shahroz's actions, highlighting the family's complex dynamics.

The storyline also introduces Maheen, Rahim's possessive fiancée, whose presence adds further tension to the evolving relationships. As secrets unravel and true intentions surface, each character is forced to confront their own beliefs, leading to transformative decisions that reshape their futures.

== Cast ==
- Sheheryar Munawar as Rahim Ali Nawaz - Aiman's husband; Ali and Daniya's son; Afiya's step-son; Shahroz's half-brother & Ali Jr's Father
- Ushna Shah as Aiman Rahim Nawaz (nee Hafeez) - Rahim's wife; Hafeez & Kulsoom's daughter; Nosheen & Samar's sister & Ali Jr's Mother
- Mehmood Aslam as Ali Nawaz - Daniya's ex-husband; Afiya's husband; Rahim and Shahroz's father & Ali Jr's Grandfather (Dead)
- Shuja Asad as Shahroz Ali Nawaz - Ali & Afiya's son; Rahim's half-brother (Dead)
- Mahenur Haider as Maheen Zulfiqar - Zulfiqar and Fareeda's daughter; Rahim's ex-fiancée
- Isra Ghazal as Afiya Ali Nawaz (nee Kamal) - Ali's wife; Shahroz's mother; Rahim's step-mother; Farooq & Faiza's sister
- Shabbir Jan as Mir Zulfiqar - Maheen's father; Fareeda's ex-husband
- Furqan Qureshi as Jamal Ahmad - Aiman's cousin and ex-fiancé
- Syed Mohammad Ahmed as Mohammad Hafeez - Aiman, Nosheen and Samar's father; Kulsoom's husband
- Kinza Malik as Kulsoom Hafeez - Aiman, Nosheen & Samar's mother; Hafeez's wife
- Sohail Sameer as Farooq Kamal - Afiya's brother
- Dodi Khan as Inspector Khan

== Reception ==
Gaitee Ara Siddiqi of The News International gave a mixed review of the series, with praise for the direction and the acting of almost all the actors. Saba Noor, in a mixed review Youlin, found: "While the central idea of Aye Ishq-e-Junoon follows a familiar pattern of rich versus poor, the drama manages to take a different route by focusing more on the complexities of family dynamics, rather than relying on the typical Saas Bahu (mother-in-law and daughter-in-law) drama, which often revolves around jealousy and rivalry.". Rasti Amena, of the Siasat Daily, praised the performances in a list of the most popular Pakistani shows in December 2024 and wrote "While the drama had a strong start, some recent episodes have seen a drag in the plot. Despite that, Sheheryar’s performance as Rahim Ali Nawaz has been widely praised." The performance of Usher Shah was criticised by Sadia Imam as lacking subtlety. Various viewers drew comparisons between the series and the 2023 Korean production King The Land.
