= Pehchaan (2006 TV series) =

Pakistani TV drama series

- Original title: پہچان
- Genre: Drama
- Written by: Azra Babar
- Directed by: Mehreen Jabbar
- Starring: Sonia Rehman; Rehan Sheikh; Deepti Gupta; Ismail Bashey; Nasreen Qureshi
- Composer: Shaun Ilahi
- Country of origin: Pakistan
- Original language: Urdu
- No. of episodes: 13

Production
- Producers: Asma Hashmi; Humayun Saeed
- Editors: Vishesh Sharma; Mehreen Jabbar
- Running time: ~38 minutes

Original release
- Network: Hum TV
- Release: 2006 – 2006

Pehchaan (transl. Identity) is a Pakistani drama television series which aired on Hum TV in 2006. The serial was directed by Mehreen Jabbar and written by Azra Babar. The serial follows the journey of three expatriates who find their true identities. It stars Sonia Rehman, Ismail Bashey, Rehan Sheikh, Deepti Gupta and Nasreen Qureshi in the lead roles. It tackles themes such as miseries of women married to foreigners, adopted children and people with lost identities.

In 2011, it was retitled as Aks (lit. "Reflection") and aired on the channel as a soap serial (splitting each episodes into two episodes of approximately 20 minutes each).

== Plot summary ==
Pehchaan is the journey of three friends, Nina, Amir and Kiran who are expatriates living in New York and discover their true identities. Amir is caught in a cold marriage and is attracted to Nina, who knows his conditions. Kiran is fleeing from her life partner and goes to America to live with Nina. She engages with Asad who is a road artist and a RJ on a nearby radio broadcast. The serial also deals with the story of film star, Sam who is Nina's real mother but Nina is unaware of it.

== Cast ==
- Sonia Rehman as Nina
- Rehan Sheikh as Asad
- Deepti Gupta as Kira
- Ismail Bashey as Amir
- Nasreen Qureshi as Sam
- Neshmia Alam (Child)
- Minha Warsi
- Khalid Nizami
- Padma Khanna
- Sunny Sharif
- Ritu Mishra
- Bittou Walia
- Chanda Gangwani

== Production ==
Humayun Saeed revealed in an interview that Indian actress Juhi Parmar would play the lead role in his next production Pehchaan, and Mehreen Jabbar would direct the serial. However, Sonia Rehman was later selected to play the lead, and she was approached by Jabbar in the U.S. It marked the debut of Indian actress Deepti Gupta, who later went to starred in other Pakistani TV dramas, such as Manay Na Ye Dil, (2007) Malaal (2009) and Neeyat (2011). Besides Gupta, the series also features some other foreign actors including American and Indian ones. It was the final collaboration of Jabbar with writer Babar after which the latter didn't write any script, with their previous collaborators include Putli Ghar, Zaib un Nisa and Amma, Abba aur Ali.

== Accolades ==
Year	Awards	Category	Recipient(s)/ nominee(s)	Result	Ref.
2007	Lux Style Awards	Best TV Play - Satellite	Pehchaan	Nominated	
2007	Lux Style Awards	Best TV Actress - Satellite	Sonia Rehman	Nominated	
