= Gharoor =

Pakistani drama television series

- Written by: Hassan Nisar
- Directed by: Tehsin Ahmed, Shabbir Ahmed
- Starring: Zia Khan; Saba Qamar; Ahsan Khan; Savera Nadeem; Jana Malik
- Theme music composer: Shehzad, Timmy
- Opening theme: Riaz Ali Khan, Hina Khan
- Country of origin: Pakistan
- Original language: Urdu
- No. of episodes: 13

Production
- Producer: Muhammad Munir

Original release
- Network: PTV Home
- Release: 2006 – 2006

Gharoor is a Pakistani drama television series broadcast on PTV Home in 2006. It was written by Hassan Nisar and directed by Tehsin Ahmed and Shabbir Ahmed. The series stars Saba Qamar, Ahsan Khan, Savera Nadeem, Jana Malik, Saba Hameed, Ashraf Khan, and Shakeel in the leading roles. The title track was composed by Shehzad and Timmy, and sung by Riaz Ali Khan and Hina Khan.

== Cast ==
- Saba Qamar as Sadia
- Ahsan Khan as Haris
- Jana Malik as Naqsheen
- Savera Nadeem as Bawi
- Saba Hameed as Bakht Begum
- Shakeel as Seth Abdullah
- Rashid Mehmood as Ghulam Qadir
- Ashraf Khan as Ditta
- Fareeha Jabeen
- Nayyar Ejaz as Basa Chaudhary
- Ali Tahir as Aulia
- Zia Khan as Tabu Khan

== Awards and nominations ==
Year	Award	Category	Recipient(s) / Nominee(s)	Result	Ref.
2007	Lux Style Awards	Best TV Actor – Satellite	Shakeel	Nominated	
2007	Lux Style Awards	Best TV Actress – Satellite	Saba Hameed	Nominated	
2007	Lux Style Awards	Best Television Play	Gharoor	Nominated	
2007	Lux Style Awards	Best Television Director	Tehsin Ahmed	Nominated	
