= Sonia Rehman =

Pakistani actress (born 1985)

- Born: 29 January 1985 (age 41); Lahore, Punjab, Pakistan
- Education: New York Film Academy
- Occupations: Actress; Host; Director
- Years active: 2002 – present
- Children: 2

Sonia Rehman is a Pakistani actress, host and director. She is known for her roles in dramas Coke Kahani, Aks, Band Khirkyon Kay Peechay and Doraha.

== Early life ==
Sonia was born in 1985 on 29 January in Lahore, Pakistan. She completed her studies from University of Lahore. Later she went to the United States with her husband and went to New York Film Academy to study black and white photography and direction.

== Career ==
She made her acting debut in 2002 on PTV. She was noted for her roles in dramas Umrao Jan Ada, Ambulance, Ghar Beetiyan and Mohabbat Karne Walon Ke Naam. She also appeared in dramas Ik Naye Mor Par, Pehchaan and Humsafar. Since then she has appeared in dramas Coke Kahani, Doraha, Band Khirkyon Kay Peechay and Aks. In 2019 she appeared in drama Dil Kiya Karay with Yumna Zaidi, Marina Khan and Feroze Khan. She also appeared in movies Khuda Kay Liye, Dobara Phir Se and Lala Begum. She also hosts Conversation With Sonia Rehman at Aaj Entertainment.

== Personal life ==
Sonia is married and has two children.

== Filmography ==
=== Television ===
Year	Title	Role	Network
2003	Umrao Jan Ada	Khursheed Begum	Geo Entertainment
2004	Ambulance	Doctor	PTV
2006	Pehchaan	Nina	Hum TV
2008	Mohabbat Karne Walon Ke Naam	Amal's mother	Hum TV
2008	Doraha	Sara	Geo Entertainment
2009	Ghar Beetiyan	Shaista's older sister	PTV
2009	The First Blast	Herself	Dawn News
2010	Ik Naye Mor Par	Jamila	PTV
2011	Aks	Anum	Hum TV
2012	Humsafar	Ammi	Indus Vision
2012	Coke Kahani	Maya	Hum TV
2013	Band Khirkyon Kay Peechay	Javeria	TV One
2015	Band Khirkyon Kay Peechay Season 2	Javeria	TV One
2019	Dil Kiya Karay	Rabia	Geo TV
2020	Conversation with Sonia Rehman	Host	Aaj Entertainment

=== Film ===
Year	Title	Role
2007	Khuda Kay Liye	Khala
2008	Small Voices	Reporter
2016	Lala Begum	Seher
2016	Dobara Phir Se	Aapi
2018	Feel In the Blanks	Sundus

== Awards and nominations ==
Year	Award	Category	Result	Title	Ref.
2004	3rd Lux Style Awards	Best TV Actress	Nominated	Ambulance	
2007	6th Lux Style Awards	Best TV Actress (Satellite)	Nominated	Pehchaan	
2009	8th Lux Style Awards	Best TV Actress (Satellite)	Nominated	Mohabat Karne Walon Ke Nam	
2010	9th Lux Style Awards	Best TV Actress (Satellite)	Nominated	Doraha	
