= Fitna (TV series) =

Pakistani television series

- Genre: Family; Soap opera
- Written by: Seema Sheikh
- Directed by: Haseeb Ali
- Starring: Maria Malik; Sukaina Khan; Shuja Asad; Danial Afzal Khan; Omer Shahzad
- Music by: SK Salman Khan
- Country of origin: Pakistan
- Original language: Urdu
- No. of episodes: 61

Production
- Producer: Momina Duraid
- Cinematography: Zakir Mir
- Camera setup: Multi-camera setup
- Running time: 35-40 minutes

Original release
- Network: Hum TV
- Release: 15 September – 13 November 2023

Fitna (Urdu: فتنہ, lit. 'Persecution') is a Pakistani drama series that premiered on Hum TV on 15 September in 2023. Directed by Haseeb Ali and written by Seema Sheikh, it is produced by Momina Duraid.

== Synopsis ==
The story follows two friends with contrasting dispositions, drawn into a lifelong conflict. As Warda seeks to make Huda’s life unbearable, the notion of friendship for Huda is shaken to the core.

== Cast ==
- Maria Malik as Huda
- Sukaina Khan as Warda
- Shuja Asad as Azmir
- Danial Afzal Khan as Shaheer
- Omer Shahzad as Arez
- Qudsia Ali as Maham
- Nadia Hussain as Talat
- Farhan Ally Agha as Ismail
- Ayesha Khan as Sarwat
- Fahima Awan as Rizwana
- Komail Anam as Azmi
- Rehana Kaleem as Rizwana's mother
- Akhtar Husnain as Harris
- Shazia Gohar as Saba
- Wahaj Khan as Salman
- Sarah Neelam as Natalia
