= Dhoop Mein Sawan =

Pakistani drama series

- Original title: دھوپ میں ساون
- Genre: Drama
- Written by: Azra Babar
- Directed by: Mehreen Jabbar
- Starring: Nadia Jamil; Yasir Nawaz; Humayun Saeed; Huma Nawab
- Theme music composer: Farrukh Abid
- Country of origin: Pakistan
- Original language: Urdu
- No. of episodes: 6

Production
- Producer: Mehreen Jabbar
- Cinematography: Anu Malik
- Production company: Tasveer Productions

Original release
- Network: Pakistan Television Corporation
- Release: 1998 – 1998

Dhoop Mein Sawan (Urdu: دھوپ میں ساون, lit. 'Monsoon in Sunshine') is a 1998 Pakistani television drama mini-series written by Azra Babar and produced and directed by Mehreen Jabbar under her production company Tasveer Productions. It aired on Pakistan Television Corporation in 1998.

== Plot ==
Saba and Asim are cousins engaged to be married. Saba is reluctant, wishing to marry someone else whose lower financial standing makes him unacceptable to her parents. Asim works at his father's production company, where Batool, a video editor, is his closest associate. Batool is in love with Asim, though he does not reciprocate. On learning of his engagement, she resorts to underhand means to prevent the marriage, including consulting a peerni.

Asim's elder brother Taimoor returns from abroad to attend the wedding. Saba's father seeks her consent before the engagement; she agrees, but later — encouraged by her sister Sara — contacts Asim to say they are incompatible and she is unwilling to continue the arrangement. Devastated, Asim calls Batool seeking comfort; she refuses. He subsequently takes his own life by overdosing on sleeping pills.

Following Asim's death, Batool tells Maryam that Saba bears responsibility for breaking off the engagement, and Maryam severs ties with Saba's family. Taimoor, however, attempts to console Saba; the two grow close and eventually marry. When Maryam discovers this, she pressures Saba to end the relationship, but Saba's mother supports her daughter. Batool, having initially tried to keep the couple apart, eventually acknowledges the harm caused by her conduct and confesses to Maryam, who is reconciled with the family.

== Cast ==
- Nadia Jamil as Saba
- Yasir Nawaz as Asim
- Huma Nawab as Batool
- Humayun Saeed as Taimoor
- Sajida Syed as Mehmooda
- Akbar Subhani as Ahmed
- Samina Ahmad as Maryam
- Salma Hassan as Sara
- Affan Qureshi as Zain
- Shakeel
- Ubaida Ansari as Rani
- Mumtaz Kanwal

== Reception ==
Sumera S.Naqvi in her review for the Dawn Images noted the performances of Ahmad, Syed Subhani and Shakeel, and found it as an interesting attempt but was critical of the superficiality.
