= Pyar Deewangi Hai (TV series) =

Pakistani TV series

- Title screen
- Urdu: پیار دیوانگی ہے
- Genre: Drama
- Written by: Misbah Ali Syed
- Directed by: Aabis Raza
- Starring: Sami Khan; Neelam Muneer; Shuja Asad
- Music by: SK Salman Khan
- Composer: Sk Salman Khan
- Country of origin: Pakistan
- Original language: Urdu
- No. of episodes: 30

Production
- Producers: Fahad Mustafa; Dr. Ali Kazmi
- Production company: Big Bang Entertainment

Original release
- Network: ARY Digital
- Release: 9 May – 5 December 2022

Pyar Deewangi Hai (Urdu: پیار دیوانگی ہے, transl. Love is madness) is a Pakistani drama series that aired on ARY Digital in 2022. Written by Misbah Ali Syed, the series was directed by Aabis Raza and produced by Ali Kazmi and Fahad Mustafa under the banner of Big Bang Entertainment. It features Sami Khan, Neelam Muneer and Shuja Asad in lead roles.

== Plot ==
Rabi and Mateen are cousins who want to get married. Rabi's family includes her mother Saima, her brother Iqbal and her sister Sara, and Mateen's family includes his mother Naseem and his father Aslam. After Naseem rejects Rabi, Saima recommends that Rabi should marry her other cousin Dawood instead, and Dawood's family only includes his mother Sajida. But, after Mateen almost commits suicide, Naseem is forced to get Rabi and Mateen married. Dawood is heartbroken after this since he likes Rabi. After their marriage, Naseem starts to physically and mentally abuse Rabi. Naseem starts to make up lies about Rabi and Dawood having an affair, turning Mateen against Rabi.

After a while, Naseem keeps abusing Rabi, and lying about it to Mateen and Aslam. Mateen finds out eventually and threatens to leave the house with Rabi, but Naseem starts fake crying in order for Mateen and Rabi to stay. Naseem even tries to make Rabi incapable of having a child. Naseem starts driving Rabi so insane that one day, Rabi, after having had enough, declares war against Naseem. Naseem decides to get Mateen married to her niece, Zebi. Mateen swears on Rabi that he won't marry Zebi, but after falling for his mother's lies, Mateen ultimately marries Zebi, unbeknownst to Rabi.

Mateen overhears Naseem and Zebi's conversation about how they made Rabi crazy and didn't make Rabi have children, which leaves Mateen heartbroken. Mateen then confronts his mother, yells at her, and leaves. After Mateen returns home, Rabi finds out that Mateen married Zebi, and when she goes to confront Mateen, Mateen asks for forgiveness from Rabi. But, she then says that whenever someone falsely swears on someone, then that person dies. So, due to this, Rabi decides to kill herself because Mateen falsely swore on Rabi that he wouldn't marry Zebi but he did marry her anyway. Rabi grabs the knife but Mateen tries to stop her, and when Aslam and Dawood arrive at the house, Rabi, uncontrollably and accidentally, slits Mateen's throat.

At the hospital, Mateen dies. Rabi is then taken to jail since she murdered Mateen. Zebi returns home with her mother after a while since she didn't want to leave Naseem alone. Saima and Sara feel worried, while Iqbal says he doesn't care about Rabi and she should rot in jail after what she did. Iqbal's wife Farwa starts to hate Rabi, as well. Sara's husband, Riyaz, left her five years ago and never came back. Sara then gets the news that Riyaz has died in a car accident, but while Sara is marrying Farwa's brother, Dawood gets a call, and learns that Riyaz is alive. Dawood then goes and stops the wedding and tells everyone Riyaz is alive, and Sara then goes to live with Riyaz. Rabi then gets the news in jail that she is pregnant, but she doesn't believe this since Naseem tried to make her incapable of having a child. Rabi starts seeing Mateen in her mind and starts going insane.

Dawood then brings Rabi out of jail, with Aslam's help, and after Iqbal rejects Rabi, she goes back to Naseem's house, where Naseem starts to abuse Rabi again for murdering Mateen. Aslam's brother Akram arrives, and he learns about Mateen's death from the neighbors. Akram starts to manipulate Rabi and says that he will help her meet Mateen. Aslam starts having suspicions on Akram's intentions. When Akram is grabbing Rabi, Aslam witnesses this, but when he goes to slap Akram, Aslam suffers a heart attack and dies. Rabi then gives birth to her new son named Hasan and she and her mother move to Dawood's house. Naseem starts to go crazy after losing both her son, Mateen, then her husband, Aslam, together one-by-one.

Iqbal then asks for forgiveness from Saima and Rabi for his ignorance towards Rabi after his newborn daughter's right leg becomes paralyzed, to which they both forgive him. Akram then sells Naseem's house, which makes her homeless and makes her go to Saima's house, where Rabi is not crazy anymore and is taking care of Hasan. Naseem plays with Hasan, thinking that Hasan is Mateen, but overnight Naseem kidnaps Hasan and takes him to a rooftop, where Dawood and Iqbal then take him back. Sara starts convincing Rabi to marry Dawood.

Naseem starts digging up Mateen's grave, which is witnessed by a man who calls someone to take Naseem away, implying that she was either arrested or taken into a mental asylum. Rabi and Dawood finally wed, but after a while, Rabi overhears a woman with her boyfriend, whose name is also Mateen. This saddens Rabi, implying that no matter how far Rabi moves on with her life with Dawood and Hasan, she can never forget Mateen. Rabi and Dawood then look away from the couple and forward at Hasan, hoping for a good future.

== Cast ==
- Sami Khan as Dawood
- Neelam Muneer as Rabi
- Shuja Asad as Mateen
- Sabahat Ali Bukhari as Sajida (Dawood's mother)
- Urooj Fatima as Sara (Rabi's sister)
- Hassan Niazi as Iqbal (Rabi's brother)
- Saba Faisal as Saima (Rabi's mother)
- Gul-e-Rana as Naseem (Mateen's mother)
- Javed Sheikh as Aslam (Mateen's father)
- Nida Khan as Zebi (Mateen's second wife-turned-widow)
- Faiza Khan
