= Malaal =

Pakistani TV series

- Opening title screen
- Genre: Family drama Romance
- Written by: Umera Ahmad
- Directed by: Mehreen Jabbar
- Starring: Faisal Rehman; Sarwat Gilani; Deepti Gupta; Imran Abbas Naqvi; Tania Kazi; Adeel Ahmed
- Opening theme: Behti Naar by Rushk
- Country of origin: Pakistan
- Original language: Urdu
- No. of episodes: 15

Production
- Producer: Momina Duraid
- Production locations: Karachi, Pakistan; New York City, USA
- Running time: 40-45 minutes
- Production company: Moomal Productions

Original release
- Network: Hum TV
- Release: 9 October 2009 – 13 March 2010

Malaal (Urdu: ملال, lit. 'Regret') is a Pakistani drama television series that premiered on Hum TV on October 9, 2009. Produced by Momina Duraid, Malaal is a story that shows how wrong decisions can affect everyone's lives and how being self-serving gets you nowhere.

It revolves around two friends, Zinia and Danish, who love each other but are forced to part ways when Danish marries Mahi at her mother's insistence, leaving Zinia heartbroken. The series marked the return of the duo, writer Umera Ahmad and director Mehreen Jabbar, who previously collaborated on the hit serial Doraha.

== Plot ==
The storyline revolves around Zinia and Danish, who have been close friends for ten years and live in the US. Both are secretly in love with each other. But when Danish goes to Pakistan to meet his mother, Afia, she rejects Zinia as she is too old to be married. Then Danish is married to a very young woman, Mahi, due to his mother's insistence. She happily marries him, and they both go to the US. Mahi also has an Internet friend, Saifi, who falls in love with Mahi and Savera her maternal cousin and best friend. When they arrive in the US, Mahi and Zinia become good friends, and Zinia moves on.

Zinia makes friends with Jawad, who turns out to be Mahi's cousin. Mahi, Zinia, and Jawad start meeting frequently, and so Jawad realises that he is in love with Zinia, although she is a decade older than him. Zinia frequently meets with Jawad, which upsets Danish and he starts fighting with Jawad and Mahi. But Zinia warns him and tells him not to interfere in her personal life as he is married now. Mahi conceives and is pregnant.

One time, Zinia's best friend Lily came to visit Zinia with her brother. Mahi also comes at the same time. Her brother is none other than Saifi. He now starts blackmailing Mahi and calling her. She disconnects the wire, which causes disputes between Danish and her. One time, Zinia also heard her phone call, and so Mahi begged her not to say anything to Danish. She agrees.

Meanwhile, Jawad proposes to Zinia, to which she reluctantly disagrees, as she is older than him by 8 years and his mother won't allow this marriage. She also starts liking him, but she is scared as she can not hear another rejection. He says that he will convince her mother. Lily also thinks that Jawad is a perfect choice for Zinia. Danish tells Mahi that Zinia will never marry Jawad because she used to love him, making Mahi upset.

On the other hand, Saifi has sent all the emails to Danish and now Danish, knows that Mahi previously had a boyfriend. He divorces her. He doesn't listen to anyone. Even Lily asks for forgiveness, but he divorces Mahi. But now Mahi starts to hate him after learning that he loves Zinia and that he wanted an excuse to leave her, and she is also able to convince her mother Aliya and her father.

Jawad comes to Pakistan. Aliya's sister and Jawad's mother also tell Savera that Aliya wouldn't have done Mahi's marriage with Danish. Danish also proposes to Zinia, but Zinia starts hating him now. Danish sees a card on which Mahi has written Happy birthday Danish. He goes to Pakistan to convince Mahi, but Mahi rejects him because she knows that he is a selfish person and is doing as Zinia had rejected him.

On the other hand, when Jawad expresses feelings for Zinia to her mother, she rejects them and starts shouting at him. She doesn't listen to her husband, Ibrahim. She talks to Afia about the same. But when Jawad says that he will only marry Zinia and that he will marry her only if his mother is convinced, She is convinced but gives a condition. He goes back to New York to meet Zinia, and so she tells to him that she has married Danish, and he says that his mother has rejected her. After few days they meet each other where Zinia says she hadn't married Danish and had lied because she knew that Jawad's mother has rejected her. Jawad says that he also lied. His mother had given Zinia the condition to Zinia that she had to leave New York. She can work in Pakistan. Zinia accepts, and they end the show together.

== Cast ==
- Imran Abbas as Jawad Ibrahim
- Faisal Rehman as Danish
- Sarwat Gilani as Mahi
- Deepti Gupta as Zinia
- Tania Kazi as Lily, Saifi's sister
- Adeel Ahmed as Saifi
- Shamim Hilaly as Afia
- Shehryar Zaidi as Mahi's father
- Badar Khalil as Mahi's mother
- Ismat Zaidi as Jawad mother
- Sanam Agha as Jawad's sister
- Raju Jamil as Ibrahim Ahmed, Jawad's father

== Broadcast and release ==
Malaal was dubbed in Arabic with name "حب و ندم" and was broadcast by MBC in the Middle East. It was also aired in India on Zindagi, premiering on 19 October 2015. The show ended its run in India on 4 November 2015. The television serial was also made available on streaming platform MX Player.

== Accolades ==
- Lux Style Awards - Best TV Serial - Nominated

== See also ==
- Noorpur Ki Rani
- Aashti
- Mannchalay
- Doraha
- Manay Na Ye Dil
- Dil, Diya, Dehleez (TV series)
