= Dil Kiya Karay =

2019 Pakistani television series

- Title screen
- دل کیا کرے
- Genre: Family drama
- Written by: Asma Nabeel
- Directed by: Mehreen Jabbar
- Starring: Feroze Khan; Yumna Zaidi
- Country of origin: Pakistan
- Original language: Urdu
- No. of seasons: 1
- No. of episodes: 30

Production
- Producers: Abdullah Kadwani; Asad Qureshi
- Camera setup: Multi-camera setup
- Running time: 40 minutes (episode 1-16); 55-75 minutes (episode 17-21); 37 minutes (episode 22-30)
- Production company: 7th Sky Entertainment

Original release
- Network: Geo Entertainment
- Release: 14 January – 8 July 2019

Dil Kiya Karay (Urdu: دل کیا کرے, lit. 'What should the heart do?') is a 2019 Pakistani television series directed by Mehreen Jabbar, produced by 7th Sky Entertainment and written by Asma Nabeel of Khaani fame. The series features Feroze Khan and Yumna Zaidi in lead roles.

== Plot ==
Armaan is a handsome young man, who lives with his joint family in Pakistan. He has always been in love with his childhood best friend Aiman who lives in the US. Armaan and Aiman share the same birthday and he collects gifts every year to give to her since she left at the age of twelve . He lives with his parents, grandmother, sister Faryal and his uncle’s widow Rabia. Armaan also has a best friend Saadi, who he loves like a brother and whose parents Raza and Talat he considers his own ‘Baba’ and ‘Mama’. When Aiman finally returns from the US, soon her parents die, causing Armaan’s sister Faryal’s marriage to break due to superstitions, making his mother resentful. Armaan acts as a support system to Aiman and plans to confess his feelings to her. But soon he discovers that Aiman and Saadi are in love with each other since their university days in the US, causing him to keep his feelings for her to himself. Armaan’s mother Rumaisa is a selfish and mean woman, who blames Aiman for his daughter’s marriage being broken and for ruining her son’s life. She misbehaves with Aiman, causing Armaan to become bitter to her.

Saadi marries Aiman and Armaan is heartbroken but sacrifices his love for his friends’ happiness. Saadi later finds out that Armaan loved Aiman and is disappointed that Armaan never told him and feels as betrayed. Armaan moves to China to try to surround himself with work and forget Aiman. Aiman and Saadi, meanwhile lead a happy married life and are about to become parents. Armaan’s widow aunt Rabia meets a widower, Hussain who is a nice respectful man, who falls in love with her. But Rabia asks for some time in deciding to marry him. Saadi, who has joined his father’s trust, faces a lot of threats due to land possession disputes that worry his family. Some time later, Saadi is kidnapped by a politician due to a land dispute. Armaan comes back and tries to save him but during the exchange of ransom, Saadi is shot while in Armaan’s arms. Aiman holds Armaan accountable for Saadi’s death. Armaan is mentally deranged after this and blames himself. He even becomes suicidal due to guilt. But when consoled by his own father as well as Saadi’s parents Raza and Talat, Armaan decides he should be there for Aiman and her child. He begins to take care of them, and begins their fight for justice against Saadi’s murderers. After a lot of effort they finally prove that the man is guilty and he is punished. During this time, Aiman realizes the depth of Armaan’s love for her, and also falls in love with him. Rabia marries Hussain and her life becomes joyful again. After Aiman saves Faryal from a rapist; Rumaisa realises her faults and apologises to everyone. Faryal finds her satisfaction in her work and realises that she doesn’t need a man to ‘complete her and also makes her mother realise this. Aiman decides to marry Armaan, and finally opens the presents he saved for her. They live happily, and bring up Saadi’s child with love.

== Cast ==
- Feroze Khan as Armaan Salman - Salman and Rumaisa's son; Faryal's brother; Aiman's childhood friend turned second husband; Saadi's childhood friend.
- Yumna Zaidi as Aiman Armaan (formerly Saadi) : Saadi's widow; Armaan's childhood friend turned wife.
- Mariyam Nafees as Faryal Salman - Salman and Rumaisa's daughter; Armaan's sister.
- Mirza Zain Baig as Saadi Raza - Raza and Talat's son; Aiman's husband; Armaan's childhood friend. (Dead)
- Marina Khan as Rumaisa Salman - Salman's wife; Armaan and Faryal’s mother.
- Shamim Hilaly as Sohana Begum - Salman's mother; Armaan and Faryal's grandmother.
- Lubna Aslam as Talat Raza - Raza's wife; Saadi’s mother.
- Abid Ali as Raza - Talat's husband;Saadi’s father.
- Sonia Rehman as Rabia - Hussain's wife.
- Sarmad Khoosat as Hussain - Rabia's second husband.
- Tanveer Jamal as Salman - Sohana's son; Rumaisa's husband; Armaan and Faryal's father.
- Mizna Waqas as Zunaira
- Saman Ansari as Aiman's mother (Dead)
- Zaheen Tahira as Bua
- Aliee Shaikh as Bilal - Saadi’s murderer.

== Soundtrack ==
The original soundtrack of Dil Kiya Karay is composed by Shahzad Ali and arranged and produced by Saad Sultan. Mustafa Zahid and Sharvari Deshpande have provided the vocals while the lyrics are by Shakeel Sohail. The song is available on Patari.

== Awards and nominations ==
- Mehreen Jabbar - Best Television Director at Pakistan International Screen Awards - Nominated
