= Shuja Asad =

Pakistani television actor

- Born: 18 September 1994 (age 32); Karachi, Pakistan
- Occupations: Actor, model
- Years active: 2021–present
- Spouse: Maheen Saeed (m. 2019)

Shuja Asad is a Pakistani television actor. He has been recognised for his performances in the dramas Khaie (2024), Aye Ishq e Junoon (2024), Tan Man Neel O Neel (2024) and Dr Bahu (2026).

== Personal life ==
Shuja was born on 18 September 1994 in Karachi, Pakistan. He married his childhood friend Maheen Saeed in 2019.

== Career ==
Shuja began his career as a model, featuring in television commercials, before switching to acting with Danish Ali's comedy sketches.

Shuja made his television debut in 2022 with Pyar Deewangi Hai. He then featured in dramas like College Gate (2023), Bandish 2 (2023), and Fitna (2023).

He gained recognition for his performances in dramas Khaie (2024) as Barlaas Khan, Aye Ishq e Junoon (2024–25) as Shehroz Ali Nawaz and Tan Man Neel O Neel (2024—25) as Sonu Danger. In 2025, he also featured in the lead role in the drama Paradise opposite Iqra Aziz.

Shuja will be next seen in lead role in drama Doctor Bahu opposite Kubra Khan.

== Filmography ==
=== Television ===
Year	Title	Role	Network	Notes	Ref(s)
2021	Dil Dharkan Aur Tum	Ahmed	Aaj Entertainment	Debut	
2022	Pyar Deewangi Hai	Mateen	ARY Digital	Negative lead	
2023	College Gate	Bilal	Green Entertainment	Supporting role	
2023	Gumn	Ali	Green Entertainment	Supporting role	
2023	Bandish 2	Ahmer	ARY Digital	Supporting role	
2023	Fitna	Azmir	Hum TV	Supporting role	
2024	Khaie	Barlaas Khan	Geo Entertainment	Supporting role	
2024	Aye Ishq e Junoon	Shahroz Ali Nawaz	ARY Digital	Negative lead	
2024	Tan Man Neelo Neel	Salman "Sonu Danger" Shaukat	Hum TV	Lead role	
2025	Paradise	Taimoor	Express Entertainment	Lead role	
2026	Fasaana Mart Ka	Rizwan	Green Entertainment	Lead role	
2026	Doctor Bahu	Salman "Sunny" Shahnawaz	ARY Digital	Lead role	

=== Telefilms ===
Year	Title	Role	Network	Notes	Ref(s)
2024	Achari Mohabbat	Sikander	ARY Digital	Lead role	

=== Music videos ===
Year	Song	Artist	Notes
2022	Main Aur Tum	Dino Ali	
2025	Sun Mere Mahiya	Aima Baig	

== Awards and nominations ==
Year	Award	Category	Work	Result	Ref.
2025	23rd Lux Style Awards	Best Emerging Talent	College Gate	Nominated	
2025	2nd Kya Drama Hai Icon Awards	Best Supporting Actor (Critics’ Choice)	Khaie	Nominated	
2025	2nd Kya Drama Hai Icon Awards	Best Supporting Actor (Popular Choice)	Khaie	Nominated	
