= Coke Kahani =

Pakistani television series

- Coke Kahani cover
- Genre: Dramedy
- Written by: Syed Mohammad Ahmed and Yasir Rana
- Directed by: Mehreen Jabbar
- Starring: Sonia Rehman; Faisal Rehman; Syra Yousuf; Syed Mohammad Ahmed; Yasir Hussain; Ahmed Zeb; Shamim Hilaly
- Country of origin: Pakistan
- Original language: Urdu
- No. of seasons: 1
- No. of episodes: 13

Production
- Production location: Karachi
- Camera setup: Multi-camera setup
- Running time: 20 min

Original release
- Network: Broadcast syndication
- Release: 3 November 2012

Coke Kahani (Urdu: کوک کہانی) is a 2012 Pakistani comedy drama sitcom directed by Mehreen Jabbar broadcasting on Broadcast syndication including PTV Home, Hum TV, Geo TV, and other networks. The sitcom is written by Syed Mohammad Ahmed and Yasir Rana, starring Sonia Rehman, Faisal Rehman, Syra Yousuf, Syed Mohammad Ahmed, Yasir Hussain, Ahmed Zeb and Shamim Hilaly. The sitcom was first aired on November 3, 2012.

== Plot ==
The TV series details the life of a young woman (Zoya) who is trying to resolve tensions between her father (Asfand), who runs a restaurant in the city of Karachi called Alfonso, and her mother (Maya), an artist residing in Florida. With the help of friends, she takes on the task of saving her family restaurant from going under and her family from breaking up. The simple story of human emotions of belonging, compassion, and love, sheds light on various social realities pertaining to the South Asian region: identity politics, patriotism, and the evolution of a hybrid culture of modernity and traditionalism. It is not the story of landlords and big business tycoons, nor does it focus on glamorous lifestyles; it is an everyday tale of ordinary people tackling ordinary issues. The story revolves around the lives and dreams of characters from diverse socio-economic and ethnic backgrounds – reflecting the multicultural metropolis that is Karachi.

== Cast ==
- Sonia Rehman as Maya
- Faisal Rehman as Asfand Jehangir
- Syra Yousuf as Zoya
- Syed Mohammad Ahmed as Mutmain Sahib
- Yasir Hussain as Beydil
- Ahmed Zeb as Raiyaan
- Shamim Hilaly as Nusrat
- Almas Fidai as Ruqaiya
- Mahira Khan as Herself (Special appearance)
