= 6th Lux Style Awards =

2007 Pakistani awards ceremony

- Date: 25 May 2007
- Site: Genting Highlands, Kuala Lumpur, Malaysia
- Hosted by: Moammar Rana and Reema Khan

Television coverage
- Channel: ARY Digital

The 6th Lux Style Awards ceremony was held in Malaysia. The show was hosted by Sana Nawaz, Shoaib Mansoor and from the members of Banana News Network.

== Film ==
Category	Winner
Best Film	Majajan
Best Film Director	Syed Noor-Majajan
Best Film Actor	Shaan-Majajan
Best Film Actress	Saima Noor-Majajan

== Television ==
Category	Winner	Nominations
Best Television Play (PTV)	Kath Putli	Malangi; Sadoori; Gharoor; Gul Bashra
Best Television Director (PTV)	Sajjad Ahmed-Gul Bashra	Kazim Pasha-Kath Putli; Ataullah Balouch-Sadoori; Tahir-Gharoor; Shahid Zahoor-Malangi
Best Television Actor (PTV)	Noman Ijaz-Malangi	Ayub Khoso-Sadoori; Shakeel-Gharoor; Farhan Ali Agha-Kath Putli; Imran Urooj-Gul Bashra
Best Television Actress (PTV)	Samina Peerzada-Kath Putli	Beenish Chohan-Sadoori; Saba Hameed-Gharoor; Sophia Mirza-Gul Bashra; Sara Chaudhry-Malangi
Best Television Play (Satellite)	Kuch Dil Ne Kaha-Geo TV	Noori-Indus Vision; Pehchaan-Hum TV; Dohri-ARY Digital; Dil, Diya, Dehleez-Hum TV
Best Television Director (Satellite)	Babar Javed-Kuch Dil Ne Kaha (Geo TV)	Allah Bachayo Kalhoro-Noori (Indus Vision); Saleem Deswali-Dohri (ARY Digital); Kamran Qureshi-Makan (Geo TV)
Best Television Actor (Satellite)	Noman Ijaz-Dohri (ARY Digital)	Javed Sheikh- Kuch Dil Ne Kaha (Geo TV); Sohail Asghar-Noori (Indus Vision); Shafi Muhammad-Noori (Indus Vision); Humayun Saeed-Tere Ishq Mein (Geo Tv); Moammar Rana-Dil, Diya, Dehleez (Hum TV)
Best Television Actress (Satellite)	Bushra Ansari-Kuch Dil Ne Kaha (Geo TV)	Saba Hameed-Tere Ishq Mein (Geo TV); Sadia Imam-Dohri (ARY Digital); Sonia Rehman-Pehchaan (Hum TV); Maria Wasti-Kuch Dil Ne Kaha (Geo TV)

== Music ==
Category	Winner	Nominations
Best Album of the Year	Doorie-Atif Aslam	Sun Re-Abbas Ali Khan; Wajj-Arieb Azhar; One Light Year at Snail Speed-Sajid & Zeshan; Masty-Ali Zafar; Raeth-Raeth
Best Video Director	Sohail Javed-Ishq	Sohail Javed-Chal Rein De; Uns Mufti-Sailing Fast; Zeeshan Parwez-Teri Parchaiyan; Mandana Zaidi-Mere Log
Best Live Act	Mekaal Hasan Band	Atif Aslam; Strings; Overload; Sajid & Zeeshan

== Special ==
Chairperson's Lifetime Achievement Award Naheed Akhtar
