= Daam =

Television series

- Promotional image
- Genre: Drama
- Written by: Umera Ahmad
- Directed by: Mehreen Jabbar
- Starring: Sanam Baloch; Aamina Sheikh; Adeel Hussain; Nimra Bucha; Sanam Saeed; Faisal Shah; Pari Hashmi khan
- Opening theme: "Daam Tha" by Zeb and Haniya
- Country of origin: Pakistan
- Original language: Urdu
- No. of episodes: 18

Production
- Producers: Humayun Saeed; Abdullah Kadwani
- Production company: 7th Sky Entertainment

Original release
- Network: ARY Digital
- Release: 11 June – 15 October 2010

Daam (Urdu: دام, lit. 'Trap') is a Pakistani drama television series which premiered on ARY Digital on 11 June 2010 and its last episode aired on 15 October 2010. The 18-episode series is directed by Mehreen Jabbar, written by Umera Ahmad and produced by Humayun Saeed and Abdullah Kadwani's production house 7th Sky Entertainment.

It was rebroadcast by ARY Network on ARY Zauq in 2013 and was also aired in India on Zindagi, premiering on 26 October 2015. The show ended its run in India on 29 November 2015.

== Cast and characters ==
- Sanam Baloch as Zara Hidayatullah; a hardworking student of MBBS, Maleeha's best friend and classmate who hails from an underprivileged family
- Aamina Sheikh as Maleeha Sami; a confident student, Zara's best friend and classmate and Junaid's sister
- Adeel Hussain as Junaid Sami; Maleeha's brother
- Nimra Bucha as Aasma Hidayatullah; Zara's elder sister who works harder as a breadwinner of her family
- Sanam Saeed as Fiza; Maleeha's stubborn and arrogant cousin and classmate
- Pari Hashmi as Mano; Zara's intellectually challenged younger sister
- Muhammad Yasir as Jamaal; Zara's brother who aspires to be an actor
- Lubna Aslam as Amna; Zara's mother
- Shahid Naqvi as Hidayatullah; Zara's good-for-nothing father
- Faisal Shah as Yasir; Maleeha's fiancé and Fiza's brother
- Syed Mohammad Ahmed as Sami; Maleeha's father who is doctor by profession
- Parveen Malik as Maleeha's mother
- Behroze Sabzwari as Haji Sahab; Amna's brother who pretends to be pious
- Atif Badar as Ghulam Ali; Shopkeeper from Zara's neighborhood
- Farah Nadir as Sajida; Haji Sahab's wife
- Ahmed Zeb as Jibran; Fiza's fiancé
- Mohib Mirza as himself
- Gohar Rasheed as himself
- Azfar Rehman as himself
- Shehrzade Sheikh as himself
- Humayun Saeed as Hassan; Zara colleague in hospital (cameo)
- Aijaz Aslam as Fareed; Aasma's husband (cameo)

== Plot ==
Zara Hidayatullah and Maleeha Sami have been two close friends for seven years. Zara belongs to a lower-middle-class family while Maleeha comes from an upper-class household, but their class difference does not threaten their friendship. Maleeha has been there for her friend through many hardships, but she never really realized the extent of anguish which plagued Zara's life. A great blow to their friendship comes when Maleeha's elder brother Junaid shows interest in marrying Zara. Their parents have no objection to the union, but it comes as a shock to Maleeha. She thought that Zara was trapping her brother, who could live a better life. Maleeha's cousin Fiza, who is also Zara and Maleeha's class fellow, starts manipulating her against Zara. Meanwhile, Zara's family found the perfect suitor for her older sister Aasma, whose marriage was a reason for depression for anyone. She promises Junaid that his family can approach hers with their proposal after her sister's marriage. But things didn't go as planned. Zara's father is imprisoned for deceit in a business scheme he was involved in. Her family needed to accumulate a large amount of money to pay for his bail, which they couldn't afford. Zara asks Maleeha for help, but Maleeha makes a bargain with her. She decides to give Zara the money only if she breaks things up with Junaid. Insulted, disdained and helpless, Zara agrees and gives Maleeha the pendant Junaid gifted to her as a token of his love. Junaid's family later approaches Zara, but she turns them down by saying that she is committed to one of her cousins. Meanwhile, Fiza starts to develop feelings for Junaid. When Junaid refuses, Fiza makes life miserable for Maleeha and her husband Yasir, who is also Fiza's brother. Meanwhile, Zara receives a 100% scholarship and shifts to Glasgow for her further education. Moving to the UK after a short period of time, Zara returns to Maleeha every single penny that Maleeha had spent on her in the seven years of their friendship.

Seven years later, a professionally successful Zara reconnects with Junaid, who is unhappily married to Fiza. Junaid discovers that Zara lied about her engagement and was single all along. He confronts Maleeha and decides to divorce Fiza. Yasir threatens Maleeha with their own divorce if Junaid abandons Fiza. Maleeha visits Zara to apologize for what she made her do.

Zara, who had no intentions of marrying Junaid, tells Maleeha how deeply she loved him and how unfair Maleeha had been. Maleeha regrets her behavior and realizes that she had lost two important people in her life. Thus she tells Junaid the truth and leaves Yasir on her own. Zara moves back to the UK, rejecting Junaid but saying it would be impossible for her to forget the memories that she made with him.

Zara tells Maleeha that Maleeha actually has no regrets about her actions, despite hurting her best friend. Maleeha's apology is solely motivated by fear of losing her own husband if Zara accepts Junaid's proposal. Maleeha tearfully confesses her jealousy, admitting that Zara has always been the winner, leaving Maleeha in second place. Consumed by insecurity upon learning of Junaid's feelings for Zara, Maleeha's actions shattered Zara's dreams. Zara explains that falling for Junaid wasn't a choice, but an escape from the reality of Zara into a picture-perfect family of Maleeha.

A year later, Maleeha calls a happily married Zara to wish her a happy birthday. When her husband asks who the caller is, Zara talks of her as an old classmate and not her former best friend, symbolizing she has moved on for the better.

== Reception ==
A reviewer from Dawn praised the several performances of the actors, including that of Baloch, Sheikh, Naqvi and Bucha but criticised the slow pace. Aslam's portrayal as a mother who always stands by her daughter was also praised.

While praising Jabbar's direction and Ahmad's screenplay, DAWN Images listed it among the 10 iconic TV dramas.

== Accolades ==
Year	Award	Category	Recipient(s)/ nominee(s)	Result	Ref.
2010	Lux Style Awards	Best Television Play - Satellite	Daam	Nominated	
2010	Lux Style Awards	Best Television Director	Mehreen Jabbar	Nominated	
