= Huma Nawab =

Pakistani actress

- Born: 1 December 1969 (age 56); Islamabad, Pakistan
- Education: University of Islamabad
- Occupation: Actress
- Years active: 1982 - Present
- Parent: Fatima Nawab (mother)

Huma Nawab is a Pakistani actress. She is one of the most popular actresses of her time and was one of the most successful actress of the 1980s and 1990s. She played major roles in TV dramas Chand Grehan, Aahat, Nijaat, Hawain, and Silsila.

== Early life ==
Nawab was born in 1969 in Islamabad, Pakistan. She completed her education at the University of Islamabad.

== Career ==
Huma did theatre plays at school, and Chand Grehan was her most successful drama, and her pairing with Ayaz Naik was quite popular. She is noted for her husky voice, well-suited to the strong characters she played in dramatic works. Nijaat and Dhoop Mein Sawan are other famous drama serials she performed in. She started her career in the mid-80s with Silsila and continued working till 1999, after which she went to the United States. Huma returned to Pakistan briefly in 2012, again in 2014, and permanently in 2015. Since then, she has been a prolific actor, with some of her noted projects being Yaqeen Ka Safar, Deedan, Surkh Chandni, Mein Na Janoo, Dil Ruba, and Hum Kahan Ke Sachay Thay.

== Personal life ==
In 2012, she came back to Pakistan, fulfilling her mother's wish who wanted to be buried next to her husband after being diagnosed with blood cancer. Huma is unmarried and lives in Islamabad. Huma's mother Fatima Nawab was also an actress.

== Filmography ==
=== Television ===
Year	Title	Role	Network
1982	Eshaan	Riffat Nagina	PTV
1983	Silsila	Seemi	PTV
1990	Dasht	Mehrunisa	PTV
1991	Aahat	Fouzia	PTV
1992	Baat Banaye Na Bane	Annie	PTV
1993	Nijaat	Zareena	PTV
1994	Hum Kahan Ke Daana Thay	Nazi	PTV
1994	Memon Seth Ki Doosri Shadi	Farzana	PTV
1995	Chand Grehan	Shehrbano	PTV
1995	Aawazain	Shabana	PTV
1996	Chotay Baray Loag	Shakeela	PTV
1996	Farar	Amber	PTV
1997	Hawain	Saima	PTV
1998	Dhoop Mein Sawan	Batool	PTV
2000	Tum Hi To Ho	Zaib	PTV
2014	Susraal Mera	Salman's mother	Hum TV
2014	Zid	Omer's mother	Hum TV
2014	Jeena Dushwar Sahi	Hammad's mother	PTV
2015	Inteha	Shehryar's mother	Express Entertainment
2015	Kitna Satatay Ho	Hammad's Khala	Hum TV
2015	Mere Ajnabi	Aayan's mother	ARY Digital
2015	Googly Mohalla	Bhaya coach	PTV
2015	Aik Thi Misaal	Asma	Hum TV
2016	Socha Na Tha	Amna	ARY Zindagi
2016	Mere Humnawa	Nasra	ARY Digital
2016	Kuch Na Kaho	Nayyara	Hum TV
2016	Tum Milay	Farida	ARY Digital
2016	Bin Roye	Safeer's mother	Hum TV
2016	Judai	Saman	ARY Digital
2017	Thori Si Wafa	Seemal's mother	Hum TV
2017	Tumhare Hain	Kiran	ARY Digital
2017	Mera Aangan	Shaista	ARY Digital
2017	Shikwa Nahin Kissi Se	Ammi	A-Plus
2017	Begangi	Mahi's mother	A-Plus
2017	Yaqeen Ka Safar	Mahjabeen	Hum TV
2018	Tum Mujrim Ho	Komal's mother	BOL Entertainment
2018	Deedan	Gul Makai	A-Plus
2019	Kaif-e-Baharan	Farah	Geo Entertainment
2019	Surkh Chandni	Safina	ARY Digital
2019	Muthi Bhar Chahat	Eman's mother	Express Entertainment
2019	Haqeeqat	Saira's mother	A-Plus
2019	Mein Na Janoo	Farah	Hum TV
2020	Rockstar	Maryam	TV One
2020	Dil Ruba	Junaid's mother	Hum TV
2021	Aks	Imran's mother	LTN Family
2021	Hum Kahan Ke Sachay Thay	Saleha	Hum TV
2021	Parizaad	Shehla	Hum TV
2022	Aitebaar	Bilal's mother	Hum TV
2022	Beqadar	Farzana	Hum TV
2022	Rasm-e-Ulfat	Arsam's mother	PTV
2022	Dil Bhatkay	Zain's mother	TV One
2022	Pehchaan	Bano	Hum TV
2022	Ilzaam	Mrs. Haleem	Aan TV
2022	Bakhtawar	Shareefa	Hum TV
2023	Ahsaas	Nazi's mother	Express Entertainment
2023	Ghao	Hina's mother	PTV
2023	Samjhota	Azra	ARY Digital
2023	Kahain Kis Se	Zubaida	Hum TV
2024	Pagal Khana	Noor's mother	Green Entertainment
2024	Raaz	Shoaib's mother	Green Entertainment
2024	BOL Kahani	Shahzad's mother	BOL Network
2025	Raaja Rani	Shaziya	Hum TV
2025	Behroopia	Tabbasum	Green Entertainment
2025	Sharakat	Azra	Green Entertainment
2026	Mere Pass Raho Tum	Zahida	Express Entertainment

=== Telefilm ===
Year	Title	Role
1985	Bazgasht	Sania
1990	Gul Phenke Hein	Rida
1994	Aaseb	Ashi
1999	Samjhota	Madiha Kamran
2017	Eid Sharaba	Azmat
2018	Glass Tora Bara Aana	Urwa's mother
2023	Budhi Ghori Laal Lagam	Ashi's mother

=== Film ===
Year	Title	Role	Notes
2015	Bin Roye	Safeer's mother	
2016	Mah e Mir	Dr Kaleem's ex-wife	
2017	Kambakht Dil	Amna Ehsaan	
2019	Dastak	Soldier's mother	
2024	Nayab	Piyari Baji	

== Awards and nominations ==
Year	Award	Category	Title	Result	Ref.
1983	PTV Award	Best Actress	Merchant of Venus	Won	
