= Noor ul Ain (TV series) =

Pakistani television series

- Genre: Drama; Romance
- Written by: Edison Idrees Masih
- Directed by: Sarmad Sultan Khoosat
- Starring: Imran Abbas; Sajal Aly
- Opening theme: Zeb Bangash; Ali Sethi
- Country of origin: Pakistan
- Original language: Urdu
- No. of episodes: 24

Production
- Producer: Abdullah Seja
- Production location: Lahore
- Running time: 40 Minutes
- Production company: Idream Entertainment

Original release
- Network: ARY Digital
- Release: 10 February – 3 July 2018

Noor ul Ain (Urdu: نور العین, lit. 'Light of the Eye') is a Pakistani romantic drama television series that started airing on ARY Digital on 10 February 2018. It is produced by Abdullah Seja and directed by Sarmad Khoosat. It stars Imran Abbas and Sajal Aly in the leading roles. The drama was first aired on 10 February on ARY Digital every Saturday, then moved to a Tuesday time slot at 9:00 P.M.

== Plot ==
The story of Noor ul Ain and Khizer is about how their chance meeting changes their lives completely, and how they fall in love with each other. They elope, thinking they can make it work, but their decision results in serious consequences.

== Cast ==
- Sajal Ali as Noor ul Ain
- Imran Abbas as Khizar Hayat
- Iffat Rahim as Ghazala
- Marina Khan as Khizar's mother
- Irfan Khoosat as Qasim; Noor and Sofi's father
- Maryam Noor as Sofiya "Sofi"
- Tahira Imam as Tanvir Fatima; Noor & Sofi's mother
- Ammad Hassan Mir as Nauman

== Soundtrack ==
Noor ul Ain OST

Soundtrack album by Zeb Bangash, Ali Sethi
- Released: 27 February 2018
- Recorded: 2018
- Genre: Television soundtrack
- Length: (3:12)
- Language: Urdu
- Label: ARY Digital

Music video
- "Noor ul Ain" OST on YouTube

Music is composed by Saad Sultan, and OST is sung by singers Zeb Bangash and Ali Sethi. According to Gulf News, Zeb Bangash got an old melody project for this OST.

== Broadcast ==
The show is available on the MX Player app, and in 2018, it was also aired on ARY Digital's sister channel ARY Zindagi.

== Awards and nominations ==
Year	Award	Category	Recipient(s)	Result	Ref.
2019	ARY Digital- Social Media Drama Awards 2018	Best OST	Noor ul Ain	Nominated	
2019	ARY Digital- Social Media Drama Awards 2018	Best Couple	Imran Abbas and Sajal Ali	Nominated	
