= Jahanara Hai =

Pakistani actress

- جہاں آرا حئی
- Born: Jahanara Begum; 23 December 1939 (age 86); Karachi, Pakistan
- Education: University of Karachi
- Occupation: Actress
- Years active: 1964 – present
- Spouse: Farooq Hai
- Children: Ayaz Hai (son)

Jahanara Hai (Urdu: جہاں آرا حئی) is a Pakistani actress. She is known for her roles in dramas Mere Humdam, Aatish, Ek Hi Bhool and Mehndi.

== Early life ==
Jahanara was born on 23 December 1939 in Karachi, Pakistan. She completed her studies from University of Karachi.

== Career ==
She started her acting career in 1964, having previously in theatre. She appeared in dramas on PTV. She is known for her roles in dramas Zard Mausam, Rishtay Kuch Adhooray Se, Mehndi, Aik Thi Misaal, Dil-e-Beqarar, Maikay Ki Yaad Na Aaye, Khalish, and Mere Humdam. She also appeared in the 2016 film Lala Begum.

== Personal life ==
Jahanara is married to Farooq and has a son.

== Filmography ==
=== Television ===
Year	Title	Role	Network
1986	Saaey	Nadia	PTV
1990	Waqt Ka Aasman	Zareen	PTV
1991	Aahat	Naheed's mother	PTV
1991	Sassi Punnu	Gul Bibi	PTV
1992	Kasak	Shamim	PTV
1993	Kashkol	Ms. Shah	NTM
1994	Ghar Aik Nagar	Aliya	PTV
1995	Yeh Zindagi	Bee Shab	PTV
1995	Mandi	Principal	PTV
1996	Babar	Qutlugh Nigar Khanum	PTV
1996	Farar	Tania's mother	PTV
1997	Waqat Ka Asmaan	Fatima	PTV
1998	Hayat-e-Javed	Syeda	PTV
1999	Tania	Mano	PTV
2000	The Castle Eik Umeed	Sumeet's grandmother	PTV
2002	Pathjhar Ki Chaaon	Sheenam	PTV
2003	Sahil Ki Tamana	Lubna's aunt	PTV
2003	Mehndi	Sauleha Begum	PTV
2007	Saheli	Nushaba	PTV
2009	Nestlé Nesvita Women of Strength '09	Herself	Geo TV
2010	Chain Aye Na	Seep's mother	Geo TV
2010	Wafa Kaisi Kahan Ka Ishq	Umer's mother	Hum TV
2010	Yeh Bhi Kisi Ki Bayti Hai	Shahzaib's mother	Geo TV
2010	Rishtay Mohabbaton Kay	Hajra	Hum TV
2011	Pul Sirat	Sitwat	ARY Digital
2011	Umm-e-Kulsoom	Rahna	ARY Digital
2012	Nadamat	Kiran's mother	Hum TV
2012	Bilqees Kaur	Maham	Hum TV
2012	Khushi Ek Roag	Adan's mother	ARY Digital
2012	Zard Mausam	Aiman's mother	Hum TV
2013	Chadar	Sahiba Begum	Urdu 1
2013	Kohar	Sitara's mother	Urdu 1
2013	Rishtay Kuch Adhooray Se	Kiran's grandmother	Hum TV
2013	Jazeera	Hasan's mother	Urdu 1
2015	Aik Thi Misaal	Missal's grandmother	Hum TV
2016	Dil-e-Beqarar	Sajida	Hum TV
2016	Rab Razi	Irshad sahiba	Express Entertainment
2016	Maikay Ki Yaad Na Aaye	Fareeda Begum	Geo TV
2017	Chandni Begum	Tabassum Begum	ARY Digital
2017	Apnay Paraye	Sufyan's mother	Express Entertainment
2017	Ek Hi Bhool	Waqar's mother	ARY Digital
2018	Be Rehem	Ashi's grandmother	Geo Entertainment
2018	Aik Mohabbat Kaafi Hai	Khushbakht's mother	BOL Entertainment
2018	Meri Baji	Sundus	ARY Digital
2018	Aatish	Sameer's mother	Hum TV
2018	Khalish	Mukhtar Begum	Geo Entertainment
2019	Mere Humdam	Zaidi's mother	Hum TV
2020	Gustakh	Jalil's mother	Express Entertainment

=== Telefilm ===
Year	Title	Role
2009	Mutthi Bhar Mitti	Amma
2012	Rangrez Mere	Dadu
2013	Ooper Gori Ka Makaan	Adeel's mother

=== Film ===
Year	Title	Role
2016	Lala Begum	Meher's mother
