= Doctor Bahu =

2026 Pakistani television series

- Showrunner: Humayun Saeed
- Written by: Sanam Mehdi Zaryab
- Directed by: Mehreen Jabbar
- Starring: Kubra Khan; Shuja Asad
- Country of origin: Pakistan
- Original language: Urdu
- No. of series: 1
- No. of episodes: 35

Production
- Executive producer: Nadeem Baig
- Production company: Six Sigma Plus

Original release
- Network: ARY Digital
- Release: 27 March – 31 July 2026

Doctor Bahu is a Pakistani television series directed by Mehreen Jabbar. It is produced by Six Sigma Plus, and stars Kubra Khan and Shuja Asad as leads, with Adeel Hussain, Saba Hamid, Shahzad Nawaz and Hajra Yamin in the ensemble supporting cast. It premiered on ARY Digital on 27 March 2026.

== Plot ==
Dr. Sania is a hardworking and talented doctor, who besides her practice in a hospital, is preparing for the FCPS. Her family is looking for a reasonable match for her marriage and the family comes across the proposal of Salman, a budding businessman by profession and the younger son of a family of all doctors which is led by his father Dr. Shahnawaz. He has bitter relationship with his father who had always wanted him to become a doctor, but he didn't opt for it due to his interest for business. He gets a shock when learns that the family is planning to getting him married to Dr. Sania. However, on the day of the fixation of their marriage Sania gets busy in an emergency in the hospital while Salman flees to Islamabad for approving loan of his company. There, Sania's family shows apprehension for the relationship upon learning that except Salman all in the family are doctors. Shahnawaz and Farheen agree on their wedding considering that Sania would bow her head in front of them and will join their hospital as their elder daughter-in-law Minha did.

== Cast ==
- Kubra Khan as Dr. Sania Salman: Salman's wife.
- Shuja Asad as Salman "Sunny" Shahnawaz: Sania's husband; Shahnawaz & Farheen's son; Faizan's brother
- Adeel Hussain as Dr. Faizan Shahnawaz: Minha's husband; Shahnawaz & Farheen's son; Salman's brother.
- Shahzad Nawaz as Dr. Shahnawaz Khan: Farheen's husband; Salman & Faizan's father.
- Syed Mohammad Ahmed as Riaz
- Marina Khan as Zainab
- Bakhtawar Mazhar as Saeeda
- Saba Hameed as Dr. Farheen Shahnawaz: Shahnawaz's wife; Salman & Faizan's mother. (Dead)
- Hajra Yamin as Dr. Minha Faizan: Faizan's wife.
- Usman Hidayat
- Mira Sethi as Dr. Amber
- Tayyab Shah

== Production ==
In January 2022, Humayun Saeed revealed that he's considering to highlight the issue of pressurising women after marriage to prioritise it over her medical career through a project. In 2023, Saeed and Nadeem Baig pitched the idea to director Mehreen Jabbar, which she liked and ultimately agreed to direct a 30-episodes series after a long hiatus. Jabbar revealed in November 2024 that after Nadaan she would direct a 25 to 30 episodes sereis.

The project was first announced in March 2025 with Kubra Khan and Shuja Asad as leads and Jabbar as director. Initially having reservations about the title Doctor Bahu, it was eventually finalised after Jabbar was convinced by Baig, who believed the title captured the essence of the story. Principal photography for the series was wrapped up on November 5, following the completion of the first spell in May. The teasers were released in March 2026 after completion of the post-production work. The series premiered on March 27, succeeding Meri Zindagi Hai Tu on its timeslot.

== Reception ==
=== Critical reception ===
In her review for The News International, Gaitee Ara Siddiqi praised the acting performances of the lead cast and their on-screen chemistry, noting that the series was "off to a promising start." Sarwat N. Shah of the Dawn praised the series for its mature and realistic portrayal of patriarchal control, coercive family dynamics, and women’s struggle for individual identity, the acting performances of Saba Hameed, Shuja Asad and Kubra Khan, and Mehreen Jabbar’s "precise" direction.
