= Kuch Dil Ne Kaha =

Pakistani television series

- DVD cover
- Urdu: کچھ دل نے کہا
- Written by: Bushra Ansari
- Directed by: Babar Javed
- Starring: Bushra Ansari; Jawed Sheikh; Maria Wasti; Noman Masood; Kanwaljit Singh
- Theme music composer: Waqar Ali
- Opening theme: Bushra Ansari
- Country of origin: Pakistan
- Original language: Urdu

Production
- Executive producer: Moomal Shunaid
- Producer: Momina Duraid
- Cinematography: Shahzad Kashmiri
- Camera setup: Multi-camera
- Production company: Moomal Entertainment

Original release
- Network: Geo Entertainment
- Release: 2006 – 2006

Kuch Dil Ne Kaha (Urdu: کچھ دل نے کہا; lit: The heart said something) is a Pakistani television series, directed by Babar Javed, produced by Moomal Shunaid under the banner Moomal Entertainment, and written by Bushra Ansari who also played the leading role in the series. Along with Ansari, it also stars Jawed Sheikh and Maria Wasti. It revolves around a middle-aged woman who is in an unloved marriage.

It won three awards at the 6th Lux Style Awards including Best TV Play - Satellite.

== Plot ==
Savera, who is in an unfulfilled marriage, becomes friends with a stranger during her holidays. After the holidays, when she returns to her house she learns that her husband is having an affair with her cousin, Shaista. She calls her new friend who consoles her.

== Cast ==
- Bushra Ansari as Savera
- Jawed Sheikh as Ahsan
- Maria Wasti as Shaista
- Noman Masood as Kabeer
- Kanwaljit Singh as Savera's love interest

== Awards and nominations ==
Year	Award	Category	Recipient(s)/ nominee(s)	Result	Ref.
2007	Lux Style Awards	Best TV Play - Satellite	Kuch Dil Ne Kaha	Won	
2007	Lux Style Awards	Best TV Director - Satellite	Babar Javed	Won	
2007	Lux Style Awards	Best TV Actor - Satellite	Jawed Sheikh	Nominated	
2007	Lux Style Awards	Best TV Actress - Satellite	Bushra Ansari	Won	
2007	Lux Style Awards	Best TV Actress - Satellite	Maria Wasti	Nominated	
