= Mehreen Jabbar =

Pakistani director & producer (born 1971)

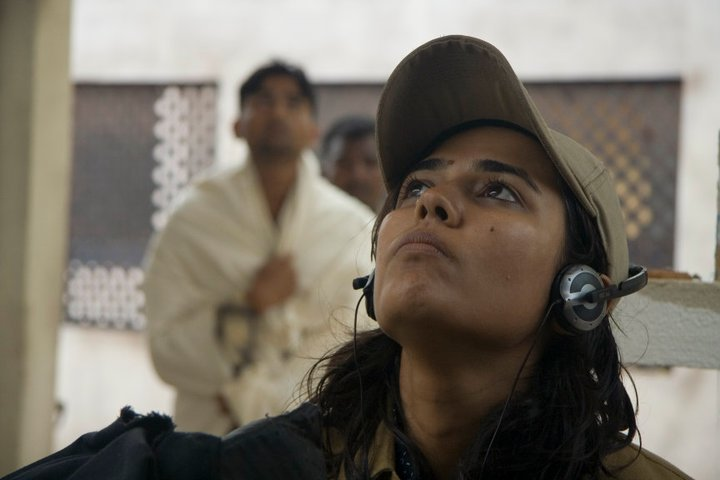
- Jabbar at the shoot of Ramchand Pakistani
- Born: 29 December 1971 (age 54); Karachi, Pakistan
- Occupations: Television producer, director, film director
- Years active: 1994–present
- Parent: Javed Jabbar (father)
- Relatives: Beo Zafar (aunt); Yasir Akhtar (cousin); Ayaz Naik (cousin)
- Website: Official website

Mehreen Jabbar (Urdu: م‍ﮩ‍رين جبار) (born on 29 December 1971) is a Pakistani film and television director and producer based in New York City. She is a daughter of the Pakistani media-person Javed Jabbar, niece of Beo Zafar and first cousin of the famous Pakistani-British singer, actor and director, Yasir Akhtar. Active since 1994, Jabbar established herself as a prolific television director. Her work for 2008 TV series Doraha earned her Lux Style Award for Best TV Director.

== Early life ==
Born in Karachi, Jabbar grew up around Pakistan's show business. Her father Javed Jabbar was born in the princely state of Hyderabad in British India and migrated to Pakistan after India annexed the state. He has been a filmmaker, and a successful ad man apart from being a former Pakistani senator and a cabinet minister. After receiving a BA degree from Saint Joseph's College in Karachi, Mehreen Jabbar went to the US to study film and completed a two-year program at University of California Los Angeles in 1993, with a Film, Television and Video certificate. She returned to Pakistan, directed and produced drama serials under the banner of TasVeer Productions, almost all of which were critically acclaimed by the Pakistani press.

== Career ==
Jabbar is a Pakistani-American director who is a 25-year veteran of the industry, with a prolific career as a Director/Producer of gritty, hard-hitting films and TV series for Pakistani and South Asian Television which have earned her both critical and commercial success. She has also made a number of narrative shorts that have been screened internationally in film festivals as well as on TV. Her award-winning short films and TV dramas include Marhoom Colonel Ki Betiyaan, Beauty Parlor, Doraha, and Daam, amongst others. In 2008, Mehreen directed her debut feature film Ramchand Pakistani for which she was awarded the ‘Global Film Initiative Grant’. The film premiered in competition at the Tribeca Film Festival and continued a successful festival run. It was later released theatrically in Pakistan, India and the United Kingdom in 2008-09 to wide critical and audience acclaim. ‘Ramchand Pakistani’ was awarded the ‘Fipresci Prize’ by the ‘International Federation of Film Critics’, the ‘Audience Award’ at the ‘Fribourg Film Festival’, Switzerland and an ‘Honorable Mention’ by the 13th Annual Satyajit Ray Award at the London Film Festival. In 2010, Mehreen was invited to screen her film at the Museum of Modern Art, New York.

Her second feature film Dobara Phir Se which was shot in New York and Karachi had a successful theatrical release in Pakistan, the UK, USA and the UAE in December 2016.

Jabbar has been a member of the National Board of Film Censors in Karachi, a founding member of the KaraFilm Festival in Karachi, Pakistan and a founder member of the NGO WAR (War Against Rape). In 2011, she was invited to the Maisha Film Lab in Uganda - a non-profit training lab founded by director Mira Nair to be a directing mentor. She is the recipient of several awards for her work and has served as a jury member in many local and international film festivals.

=== Ramchand Pakistani ===
Ramchand Pakistani was Jabbar's first feature-length film, which was released in Pakistan, India and the UK to wide critical and audience acclaim. The film premiered in the competition section of the Tribeca Film Festival in New York in 2008. It won the FIPRESCI PRIZE from the International Federation of Film Critics and received Honourable Mention by the 13th Annual Satyajit Ray Awards at the London Film Festival, 2008 as well as the Audience award at the Fribourg International Film Festival. The film recently had a week-long screening at the MOMA (Museum of Modern Art) in New York.

Jabbar directed the web drama series Ek Jhoothi Love Story which was released on ZEE5 in October 2020.

== Filmography ==
=== Film ===
Year	Title	Notes
2008	Ramchand Pakistani	
2013	Dil Mera Dhadkan Teri	Telefilm
2016	Dobara Phir Se	
2016	Lala Begum	Short film
2018	Dino Ki Dulhaniya	Telefilm
2018	Hum Chale Aaye	Telefilm

=== Web series ===
Year	Title	Platform	Notes
2020	Ek Jhoothi Love Story	ZEE5	
2025	Farar	ZEE5	

=== Television ===
Year	Title	Network	Notes	Ref(s)
1996	Ab Tum Ja Saktey Ho			
1997	Farar			
1998	Dhoop Mein Sawan		Miniseries	
2000	Aur Zindagi Badalti Hai			
2001	Kahaniyaan			
	Chalo Phir Se Muskurain			
	Afsoon Khawab			
	Beauty Parlor			
	Marhoom Colonel Ki Betiyaan			
	Deeda-e-Purkhoon			
	Harjai			
	New York Stories			
	Lal Baig			
	Abba Amma Aur Ali			
	Putli Ghar			
	Sanam Gazida			
2006	Pehchaan			
2008	Doraha			
2009	Malaal			
2010	Vasl			
2010	Wapsi		Telefilm	
2010	Daam			
2011	Daam			
2012	Mata-e-Jaan Hai Tu			
2012	Coke Kahani			
2013	Ghoonghat		Telefilm	
2013	Rehaai			
2014	Jackson Heights			
2015	Mera Naam Yousuf Hai			
2019	Dil Kiya Karay			
2020	Meray Dost Meray Yaar Season 2	Geo Entertainment	Miniseries	
2023	Jurm	Geo Entertainment	Miniseries	
2024	Nadaan	Hum TV	Miniseries	
2026	Doctor Bahu	ARY Digital		

== Awards and nominations ==
- Ramchand Pakistani wins FIPRESCI Award from the International Federation of Film Critics and receives Honourable mention by the 13th Annual Satyajit Ray Awards at the London Film Festival (2008)
- Won – Indus Drama Awards (2004) Best Director for Harjai
- Won – IndusVision Young Achievers Award (2002)
- Won – Kara Film Festival (2001) Best Director & Best medium-length Film for Daughters of the Late Colonel
- Won – Pakistan Media Award (2010) Best Drama – Satellite Malal
- Nominated - Hum Awards (2012) Best Director for Mata-e-Jaan Hai Tu

=== Lux Style Awards ===
Ceremony	Category	Project	Result	Ref.
9th Lux Style Awards	Best TV Director	Doraha	Won	
10th Lux Style Awards	Best TV Director	Daam	Nominated	
13th Lux Style Awards	Best TV Director	Rehaai	Nominated	
16th Lux Style Awards	Best Film Director	Dobara Phir Se	Nominated	

== Festival screenings ==
Beauty Parlor screened at:

- Hong Kong International Film Festival
- Pusan Film Festival, South Korea
- San Francisco Asian American Film Festival, USA
- Trikone Festival, USA
- New Orleans Film Festival, USA
- Toronto Inside Out Film Festival, Canada
- Regent Park Film Festival, Canada
- Leeds Film Festival, UK
- Bite the Mango Festival, UK
- Travelling Film Festival of the British Film Institute. UK
- Screenings at Pioneer Theatre, and the Queens Museum of Art, New York .

Daughters of the Late Colonel screened at:

- KaraFilm Festival, Pakistan

Ramchand Pakistani Official Selection at:

- Tribeca Film Festival
- Seattle International Film Festival
- Osian Film Festival
- Rhode Island International Film Festival
- Pusan International Film Festival
- London International Film Festival
- South Asian International Film Festival
- Third I Film Festival, San Francisco
- Cairo International Film Festival
- Dubai International Film Festival
- Kerala Film Festival
- Fribourg Film Festival

Lala Begum screened at:

- Jagran Film Festival, Delhi, India
- MISAAF Film Festival, Canada
- Dallas South Asian Film Festival, USA
- Washington DC South Asian Film Festival, USA (Winner, Best Story)

Dobara Phir Se screened at:

- Chicago South Asian Film Festival, USA
- Tasveer Seattle South Asian Film Festival, USA
