= Doraha (TV series) =

Pakistani television series

- Opening title screen
- Genre: Romance; Drama
- Written by: Umera Ahmad
- Directed by: Mehreen Jabbar
- Starring: Humayun Saeed; Sonia Rehman; Sanam Baloch; Adnan Siddiqui
- Opening theme: Tum Kahan Chal Diye by Jal
- Ending theme: Duniya
- Composers: Ilahi & Delorenzo
- Country of origin: Pakistan
- Original language: Urdu
- No. of episodes: 14

Production
- Producers: Humayun Saeed & Abdullah Kadwani
- Editor: Mehreen Jabbar
- Production company: 7th Sky Entertainment

Original release
- Network: Geo Entertainment
- Release: 17 October 2008 – 23 January 2009

Doraha (Urdu: دوراہا) (English: Crossroads) is a Pakistani drama television series which premiered on Geo Entertainment on 17 October 2008. It is an adaptation of an Urdu novel Mein Ne Khawabon Ka Shajar Dekha Hai, written by Umera Ahmad. The serial is produced by Humayun Saeed and Abdullah Kadwani's production house 7th Sky Entertainment and directed by Mehreen Jabbar.

The official soundtrack is called Tum Kahan Chal Diye, composed and performed by Jal the band. It was one of the tracks in Jal's album Boondh, released in 2007 and was well received by the listeners.

In an audio interview given to Raju Jamil, Humayun Saeed revealed that given the success of Doraha, 7th Sky Entertainment is planning to produce a second season of the serial with the same cast. However, the sequel was never made and the reasons remain unknown.

== Synopsis ==
Shahla (Sanam Baloch) and Umer (Humayun Saeed) are cousins living in the same neighbourhood. They both belong to middleclass families, but as Shahla is the only girl of her parents, her family is better off than Umer's. Umer is six years older than Shahla and adores her like a little sister. But Shahla fancies him and tries to show him her feelings again and again by making him Biryani and many other delicious dishes. Umer is doing his graduation and is in love with his fellow university mate Sara (Sonia Rehman), who belongs to a sound family and when she tells her parents (Mohammed Ahmed, Ismat Zaidi) about Umer's proposal, they immediately refuse to give permission. But that gets sorted and her parents give their permission for this marriage. However, Umer's mother (Badar Khalil), who wanted Shahla and Umer to marry, refuses to accept her new daughter-in-law and doesn't even pretend to be happy on their wedding day.

Shahla however, shows no sign of hurt and gets on with her new bhabhi. Sara's new house is nothing like where she used to live before. Even the food is not the same. But Sara adjusts to the new environment in a mature way and doesn't throw tantrums or make demands to her husband. But her mother-in-law is anything but appreciative towards her, since she always thinks that Sara stole Umer away. The first time Sara cooks meal, Umer's mother calls it badly cooked in front of Shahla who doesn't stop bringing meal from her house for Umer and his family, even though her mother (Parveen Akbar) tells her off for that. Umer who loved Shahla's food prefers having his wife's meal that night. Sara's father-in-law (Qazi Wajid) is also supportive of her, but soon Sara loses his support too, when she helps her sister-in-law marry the man she loves.

After two years of marriage and household chores Sara talks to Umer about taking up a day job. Umer refuses at first but reluctantly agrees later on. This gives his parents another point of mocking Sara because they worry too much of what the society thinks. Shahla, who has been engaged recently, pours oil on the fire and talks ill with her aunt (Umer's mother) about working women. One day she brings qorma for Umer but he is not at home. Sara tells her not to bring food from her home whenever she visits and Shahla starts weeping over it. Shahla comes back the next day when Sara's mother comes to see her daughter, only to hear Umer's mother ridicule Sara. All limits are crossed when everyone starts blaming each other for everything. Umer gets fed up of this constant fighting at home and ends it all by divorcing Sara.

Umer marries Shahla in the next few days. Now is the perfect time for her to tell Umer about her feelings for him since her childhood. But she never gets a chance to do so because the marriage doesn't turn out to be as magical as she thought it would. Shehla is delighted and happy on finally getting what she wanted and takes over the reins of the house and the new wife of Umer. Shehla and her mother in law do not get along and Shehla convinces Umer to keep her in a new and separate house, this makes Umer's mother realize what a gem Sara was, who despite so much opposition from her was living with them and serving them. Sara also marries again, this time to Asfar (Adnan Siddique). Though she takes a little while to make the decision unlike Umer. One day accidentally Umer sees Sara (this was their first encounter after the divorce), at a hospital where she's being treated for wounds caused by her husband's beating. Asfar was a divorcee as well and a mentally unstable person with trust issues with his previous wife. Umer blames himself for her condition and quickly lets Sara's parents know about this and this is how Sara's second marriage, which was more painful than the first, ends. Umer who is still in love with his ex-wife and having a tough time with his new wife, divorces Shahla, despite having a daughter with her. And it all comes back to where it all started. Umer and Sara start a new life together, for the second time.

== Cast and characters ==
- Humayun Saeed as Umer
- Sonia Rehman as Sarah
- Sanam Baloch as Shahla
- Badar Khalil as Umer's mother
- Qazi Wajid as Umer's father
- Parveen Akbar as Shahla's mother
- Ismat Zaidi as Samra, Sarah's mother
- Syed Mohammad Ahmed as Hussain, Sarah's father
- Adnan Siddiqui as Azfar
- Javeria Abbasi as Sofia, Sarah's sister
- Tahira Wasti as Smaina

== Broadcast ==
Doraha originally broadcast on Geo Entertainment from 2008 to 2009, airing a weekly episode.

It re-aired in UK on Geo TV UK, following the success of the highly-rated Meray Paas Tum Ho, also starring Saeed and Siddiqui.

== Reception ==
=== Critical reception ===
In the journal of January 2010 of The Herald, a reviewer praised the series for its storyline, dialogues and strong performances, stating that it has "broke ground in more than one way".

== Awards and nominations ==
Year	Awards	Category	Recipient(s)/ nominee(s)	Result	Ref.
2010	Lux Style Awards	Best TV Play - Satellite	Doraha	Nominated	
2010	Lux Style Awards	Best TV Director	Mehreen Jabbar	Won	
2010	Lux Style Awards	Best TV Actor - Satellite	Humayun Saeed	Nominated	
2010	Lux Style Awards	Best TV Actress - Satellite	Sonia Rehman	Nominated	
