= Nijaat =

Pakistani television drama serial

- Opening title screen
- Genre: Drama, Family
- Written by: Asghar Nadeem Syed
- Directed by: Sahira Kazmi
- Starring: Atiqa Odho; Huma Nawab; Latif Kapadia; Marina Khan; Noman Ijaz; Sajid Hasan; Durdana Butt
- Country of origin: Pakistan
- Original language: Urdu
- No. of episodes: 13

Production
- Producer: Sahira Kazmi
- Production locations: Gharo and Karachi in Pakistan
- Editor: Naeem Siddiqui

Original release
- Network: PTV
- Release: 1993

Nijaat (Urdu: نجات; lit. 'Salvation') is a 13-episode 1993 Pakistani television drama serial produced and broadcast by Pakistan Television. The drama shows the different roles of women in Pakistan. Through focusing on the lives of three women, it compares the lot of women in the rural and urban life. It emphasizes family planning, ending child labor and initiating community health reforms.

== Plot ==
This drama is based on the interwinding stories of three families in a town Gharo in Pakistan: Zareena, a health worker, and her family; Huzoor Bakhsh and Sajida, who has had so many children that she has very poor health; and Ali Asad, an Assistant Commissioner and his wife Tania. The drama follows their hopes and frustrations as they strive for a better future while trying to hang on to the past.

== Cast and characters ==
| Character | Played by | Notes |
|---|---|---|
| Huzoor Bakhsh | Noman Ijaz | A fox hunter and later tries to establish a shop. |
| Sajida | Atiqa Odho | Housewife facing maternity and other domestic issues. She helps Tania in her handicrafts (embroidery) institute. |
| Zareena | Huma Nawab | Nurse at the local clinic |
| Ali Asad | Sajid Hasan | Assistant Commissioner of the Tehsil. Before coming to the town, he was a medical doctor. |
| Akram | Khawaja Akmal | P.A to Assistant Commissioner. |
| Tania | Marina Khan | Wife of Assistant Commissioner. Previously, she was a model. |
| Jivan/Makhdoom | Latif Kapadia | Father of three children, including Zareena. Seen as a character with no consideration of his family. He tried to marry young Kulsoom, in exchange for his daughter Razia for Qadir Baksh. |
| Qadir Bakhsh | Yousuf Ali | Brother of Huzoor Bakhsh. He came from Dubai. He helps set up a shop for his brother. He was involved in criminal smuggling including child smuggling. Typical man who likes to boast and share his good times with his people. |
| Masi Taqdeera | Salma Zafar | Match-maker and midwife |
| Ustad Pardesi | Malik Anokha | Owner of the local hotel |
| Shafqat | Durdana Butt | She is called Aapa. |
| Zehra Khatoon | Rehana Akhtar | Religious preacher |
| Kashi | Sajjad Hassan | Son of Huzoor Bakhsh. He tries to flee for the city. He is kidnapped by a criminal mafia in the city which trains him to pick pockets. Later, he ends up on the Qadir Bakhsh's boat with many other children, who are being smuggled to the Middle East. |
| Taari | Emad Hassan | Son of Huzoor Bakhsh |
| Kulsoom | Qurat Ul Ain | Sister of Huzoor Bakhsh |
| Razia | Aisha Saqib | Daughter of Jivan |
| Master Khadim Hussain Bahar | Nisar Qadri | Teacher at the local school. |
| Rasheed | Naeem Siddiqui | Compounder (pharmacist) at the local clinic. |
| Sansi Baba | Yaqoob Zakria | A nomad Sansi skinning and drying hunted foxes. |
| Luchmi | Najma Ali | Daughter of Sansi Baba |
| Nabeel Noor | Nanha | Son of Jivan and friend of Kashi. |
| Baalla Dubai Wala | Aamir Ali | Involved in child trafficking. |
| Saith Razzaq | Sultan Jilani | Aarhti |
| Sarmad | Aslam Latar | Labour union leader |
| Maulvi | Tariq Tirmazi | Custodian of a local Madrasa. |

== Music ==
The background score is composed by Arshad Mehmood. The drama features the following songs:

Track listing
| No. | Title | Lyrics | Singer(s) | Length |
|---|---|---|---|---|
| 1. | "Mera dard naghma-e-bay-sada" | Faiz Ahmad Faiz | Nayyara Noor |
| 2. | "Zard mitti ki aghosh mein" | | Tina Sani |
| 3. | "Dekhte hi dekhte hamein pyar hua" | | Alamgir |
| 4. | "Phool barsein pyar ki raahon main" | | Alamgir |

== Social Impact ==
A study was undertaken to evaluate the social impact of this drama on contract to Johns Hopkins University/Population Communication Services (JHU/PCS) by Aftab Associates (Pvt.) Ltd., Lahore, Pakistan. The support for this study was provided by International Development Research Center (IDRC), Canada. The usefulness of findings from qualitative evaluations of 'Nijaat' (and Alang-Alang in Indonesia) has led to further collaborations between JHU/PCS and filmmakers.
