= Farar =

Pakistani television film

- Title screen
- Original title: فرار
- Genre: Drama
- Screenplay by: Azra Babar
- Story by: Azra Babar; Mehreen Jabbar
- Directed by: Mehreen Jabbar
- Starring: Marina Khan; Sania Saeed; Huma Nawab
- Country of origin: Pakistan
- Original language: Urdu

Production
- Producer: Mehreen Jabbar
- Cinematography: Anu Malik
- Editor: Pervaiz Piyar Ali
- Production company: Tasveer Productions

Original release
- Network: Pakistan Television Corporation
- Release: 1996

Farar (Urdu: فرار, lit. 'Escape') is a 1996 Pakistani television film written by Azra Babar and directed by Mehreen Jabbar, produced under her company Tasveer Productions. It starred Marina Khan, Sania Saeed, and Huma Nawab in the leading roles. The telefilm first broadcast on Pakistan Television in 1996 and was later screened on Indus Vision. Set in Karachi, it follows three friends of contrasting personalities as they navigate love, ambition, and the pressures of the city.

== Plot ==
Farar centres on three friends living in Karachi. Amber is a divorcee who lives with her mother and pursues various schemes, including carpet selling and real estate, to raise money to go abroad, only to be deceived each time. Natasha, whose family is settled in London, lives with Amber and works in an office. She has been in love with her colleague Ali since their college days, though he is married and makes no commitment to her. Tania lives with her parents and is drawn to the arts; she studies Kathak and frequently feels constrained by her parents' disapproval of her interests.

In her Kathak class, Tania grows close to Asad, a fellow student who shares her passion. She wishes to marry him, but her parents object to his involvement with dance. Meanwhile, Amber and Tania attempt to make Natasha see that Ali is leading her on; she resists out of fear of losing him. She eventually confronts Ali about their relationship and, shortly afterwards, sees him dining with his wife on their wedding anniversary, prompting her to acknowledge the situation.

Tania's parents insist Asad abandon Kathak as a condition of marriage; she refuses to ask this of him. Natasha ultimately decides to join her family in London. Her friends see her off at the airport, where Tania promises to bring her back for her wedding, and Amber announces her latest venture: animal farming.

== Cast ==
- Marina Khan as Natasha
- Sania Saeed as Tania
- Huma Nawab as Amber
- Humayun Saeed as Asad
- Shabbir Jan as Ali
- Badar Khalil as Amber's Mother
- Jahanara Hai as Tania's Mother
- Dawood Nawaz as Tania's Father
- Fasih Ur Rehman as himself

== Remake ==
In 2022, Mehreen Jabbar directed a web series based on the telefilm, released on ZEE5. The series featured Sarwat Gillani, Mariam Saleem, and Maha Hassan in the leading roles.

== Reception ==
The telefilm was noted for its feminist perspective and its unconventional portrayal of female characters. A reviewer in The Nation praised the treatment of classical dance as respectful and considered.
