= Hassan Nisar =

Pakistani journalist and columnist (born 1951)

Hassan Nisar حسن نثار
- Born: 5 July 1951 (age 75); Faisalabad, Punjab, Pakistan,
- Education: Government College University Faisalabad, University of the Punjab
- Occupations: Journalist, Political commentator

Hassan Nisar (Punjabi, Urdu: حسن نثار; born 5 July 1951) is a Pakistani journalist, newspaper columnist, TV news analyst, and Urdu poet.

== Early life and education ==
Hassan Nisar was born on July 5, 1951 in Faisalabad, Punjab into a literary Punjabi Arain family, Nisar being one of six children. The family had migrated from Amritsar following the 1947 partition. His grandfather was an intellectual fluent in English and Persian, who gave his name to the Farid Chowk in Amritsar.

He completed his Matriculation and FA from Faisalabad and then studied Journalism and Economics at the University of the Punjab, Lahore.

== Career ==
=== Journalism and literature ===
Nisar's father wanted him to become a civil servant but he himself wanted to become a movie writer, beginning his professional career in 1972 when he was offered a job as a journalist, before writing poetry, film songs and editing a monthly magazine called Zanjeer.

=== Television dramas ===
He has written television dramas, including Hawa Pe Raqs (2000), directed and produced by Abid Ali, a story about the conflict between a feudal father and his revolutionary son.

=== Politics ===
He was a supporter of Zulfikar Ali Bhutto, eventually being put in jail by Zia-ul-Haq and forced into exile in Saudi Arabia for some time, and more recently he has been a supporter of Imran Khan.

=== Food business ===
Because his salary as a journalist was low, Hassan Nisar used to operate businesses selling dahi vada and tikka kebab.

=== Host ===
In more recent years, he became a TV talk show host on Choraha for Geo News in 2008 and a political commentator on TV talk show Meray Mutabiq.

== Books ==
=== Politics ===
- Chauraha, 1996. Collection of columns published in Daily Jang newspaper.
- Zindah Insan ka Alamiyyah, 1999. Collection of early political columns.
- Bibi, Babu aur Bay Bas Awam, 2022.

=== Literature ===
- Kaley Qol, 2017.
- Adamkhor Nizam Ka Noha, 2021.
