= Lala Begum =

- Release poster
- لالا بیگم
- Directed by: Mehreen Jabbar
- Written by: Syed Mohammad Ahmed
- Produced by: Shailja Kejriwal; Mehreen Jabbar; Vikas Sharma
- Starring: Marina Khan; Sonia Rehman; Humayun Saeed; Syed Mohammad Ahmed; Shehryar Zaidi; Jahanara Hai
- Cinematography: Mo Azmi
- Music by: Haniya Aslam
- Distributed by: Zee5
- Release date: 6 August 2016 (MISAFF)
- Running time: 58:00
- Country: Pakistan
- Language: Urdu

Lala Begum (Urdu: لالا بیگم) is a 2016 Pakistani drama short film directed by Mehreen Jabbar, written by Syed Mohammad Ahmed and co-produced by Shailja Kejriwal, Mehreen Jabbar and Vikas Sharma.

== Plot ==
The story revolves around the bitter relationship of two sisters, Meher and Seher in the 1970s. They have not been speaking to each other for the last 20 years. As Seher becomes a widow, she returns home to claim her share of the family estate but Meher refuses to share the estate, because she believes her sister brought dishonor to the family by marrying her husband, Ahmed, and holds the grudge to this day. Meher has stayed single to honor her father’s legacy. According to him, if she were to marry, then a suitor could potentially swindle the family out of their estate. In order to protect it, she chose to be single. This sacrifice came with a sense of loneliness and estrangement. As for Seher, who believed in breaking the walls that Meher and her father put up in the family, things have not been hunky dory. However, her situation and the opposition from her family left her helpless.

== Cast ==
- Marina Khan as Meher / Lala Begum
- Sonia Rehman as Seher
- Jahanara Hai as Meher's mother
- Humayun Saeed
- Syed Mohammad Ahmed
- Shehryar Zaidi

== Release ==
The film premiered at the Mosaic International South Asian Film Festival on 6 August 2016 under the Zeal for Unity banner. It is scheduled for public release on 4 November 2016.

== Reception ==
=== Critical reception ===
Lala Begum received a positive review from Swati Sharan of India.com after the film was premiered at MISAFF. She said ″Overall, Jabbar has manufactured a film with great tones of suspense alongside a revelation of how much precious time we waste hanging on to our false prestige without truly enjoying ourselves.″
