= Zeb and Haniya =

Musical Duo

- Origin: Kohat, Khyber Pakhtunkhwa, Pakistan
- Genres: Pop rock, alternative rock, sufi rock, folk rock, classical music, blues
- Years active: 2007–2014
- Labels: Fire Records, True Brew Records
- Past members: Zebunnisa Bangash; Haniya Aslam
- Website: zebandhaniya.com

Zeb and Haniya (Pashto: زیب اور حانیا, pronounced as "Zayb aur Haa-nee-ya") was a Pakistani music duo from Kohat, active from 2007 to 2014. The pair sang songs in Pashto, Urdu, Dari and Turkish, combining pop with folk music to create a diverse body of work. Their music has been described as alternative, art folk, ethnic blues and easy listening by international reviewers and critics.

The band was a project started by two cousins, Zebunnisa Bangash and Haniya Aslam (1978–2024), both ethnic Pashtuns. Brought up with music, they began writing together when studying as undergraduates at Smith College and Mount Holyoke College in the United States.

While their family came from Kohat, Khyber Pakhtunkhwa, much of the band's work took place in Islamabad and Lahore. Touring in 2009, they performed mostly in Dubai, and in some parts of Sindh and Punjab.

== History ==
=== Formation (2000–2007) ===
Zebunnisa Humayun Bangash has been singing since age eight and has been training as a vocalist since 1998 with acclaimed Ustad Mubarak Ali Khan. Her fellow musician and first cousin, Haniya Aslam, was a guitarist, vocalist and songwriter. Zeb and Haniya was conceived while the pair attended college in the United States; Zeb studied Economics and History of Art and Haniya studied Computer Science and Anthropology. Chup, their first song, came to life in sessions at an abandoned café in the basement of Zeb's dorm. After a positive response from the college community, Zeb and Haniya recorded a rough version of Chup and another song titled Yaad with Mekaal Hasan (of Mekaal Hasan Band). They spread via the internet and soon found their way onto Pakistan's City FM 89 radio waves.

After the success of Chup and Yaad, Zeb and Haniya began performing live. The first performance was commissioned by the American Consulate in Islamabad, followed by their first full-length concert in Lahore.

=== Chup! (2008) ===
In 2007, the girls began the process of recording their debut album, releasing Chup! in Pakistan in July, 2008. Nine of the album's 10 songs are original compositions. Produced by Mekaal Hasan, the accompanying musicians included: former Noori drummer, Louis 'Gumby' Pinto on percussion, Shallum Asher Xavier of Fuzon on lead guitar, and bass by Kamran 'Mannoo' Zafar. Mauj's Omran Shafique contributes blues lead guitar on one song, and Co-Ven's Hamza Jafri, Sikander Mufti and Sameer Ahmed feature on the album's closing number, a high-spirited fusion track. The Norwegian jazz trumpeter, Hildegunn Øiseth, makes an appearance on five tracks.

In addition to recording the album and shooting for videos, 2007 and 2008 were marked by a multitude of appearances on Pakistani television networks, including Geo, Dawn, Aaj, and CNBC. After the album launch, Zeb and Haniya toured Pakistan, promoting their album with live shows and media appearances. Zeb and Haniya also graced print media, with multiple appearances in local Pakistani newspapers and magazines, including The News International, Dawn News, The Friday Times, Newsline, and numerous others, including a feature in the cover story of The Herald's 2008 Annual Issue. The band also appeared in international publications, including Newsweek International, BBC Online World Service, Rolling Stone India, Khaleej Times and The Hindu. They were also featured in their respective alumnae magazine, Smith College and Mount Holyoke College, as well as on an NPR radio show, The World.

The band said that they attempt to produce a diverse body of work, combining pop music with Pushto and Dari folk music. Their debut album received positive reviews in most of Pakistan's major newspapers, and they were hailed as one of the (if not the) first all-female bands from Pakistan.

=== Coke Studio (2009–2010) ===
In 2009, they performed "Paimona", "Chup" and "Chal Diye" at Coke Studio Sessions along with the artists Javed Bashir, Noori, Atif Aslam, Ali Zafar, and Strings. On 14 August 2009, The group performed at the last Coke Studio Session with their song, "Rona Chor Diya".

On 15 May 2010, they featured in the third season along with Noori, Aunty Disco Project, Karavan, Entity Paradigm, and Abida Parveen. On 1 June 2010, Zeb & Haniya recorded and released a soundtrack, also named "Daam", for the Pakistani TV serial Daam. On 6 June 2010, at the third season of Coke Studio Zeb and Haniya performed among with artists Arieb Azhar, Abida Parveen, Meesha Shafi (of Overload), Karavan and Arif Lohar, playing an Afghan folk song, "Bibi Sanam Janem". On 20 June 2010, Zeb & Haniya performed a duet "Tann Dolay" with Noori on the third season second episode, "Will". On 18 July 2010, Zeb & Haniya performed "Nazaar Eyle", a cover of a song sung by Turkish singer Barış Manço, at the Coke Studio third season fourth episode, "Form".

=== The Happy Song (2011–present) ===
On 7 April 2011, while talking to NPR Music, the band discussed music in a time of extremism in Pakistan. The duo concluded regardless of the country situation they are fully focused on their work and are working on releasing an album. "It is relevant to us, this is the world that we are living in, this is the situation that we are surrounded by and we are responding in someway or the other. This song we just wanted it to be a lovely pleasant song that makes you smile and makes you feel good", said Haniya Aslam. Zebunnisa Bangash added "Despite everything, there are beautiful things happening in this country, there are moments of happiness, there's happiness all around, so we thought it might actually be nice to bring that together into a song".

On 11 May, in an interview with the newspaper The Express Tribune, Zeb and Haniya confirmed that they would be releasing a seven track extended-play, The Happy Song, in fall through the record label True Brew Records. Bangash said: "We are feeling a bit more confident, so we are taking a few experimental steps here and there, kind of pushing our envelope a little bit", and in regard to the album said "It's going to be a collaborative effort, and several known as well as lesser known people will be involved. Aslam added: "It's going to be exciting because the writings are being done without the aim of releasing an album, so the spirit in which things are being done has excited us". The band stated that they were looking forward to making a career in India; Bangash said "India has a huge classical music tradition, which is one of my passions".

Bangash contributed to "Sooha Saha" for A.R. Rahman's Highway Hindi film music in 2014.

In 2016, Bangash released the previously recorded, but unreleased track, "Dadra".

Haniya died from cardiac arrest on 11 August 2024, at the age of 46.

== Discography ==
=== Studio albums ===
- Chup! (2008)

=== Singles ===
- "Paimona" (Coke Studio 2)
- "Chup" (Coke Studio 2)
- "Rona Chor Dia" (Coke Studio 2)
- "Chal diyay" (Coke Studio 2)
- "Bibi Sanam Jaanam" (Coke Studio 3)
- "Nazar Eylee" (Coke Studio 3)
- "Kya Khayal Hai" (The Dewarists)
- "Laili Jaan" (Coke Studio 6)

== Awards ==
- Zeb and Haniya won the Best Live Act Award at MTV Music Awards in 2009.
- Zeb and Haniya were nominated for the Best Live Act Award at Lux Style Awards in 2008.
- Zeb and Haniya were nominated for the Best Singer at 3rd Pakistan Media Awards in 2012.
- Zeb and Haniya were nominated for the Best Singer Female at Pakistan Media Awards in 2011.

== See also ==
- List of Pakistani music bands
