= Ramchand Pakistani =

- Theatrical release poster
- Directed by: Mehreen Jabbar
- Written by: Javed Jabbar
- Screenplay by: Mohammad Ahmed
- Produced by: Javed Jabbar
- Starring: Rashid Farooqui; Nandita Das; Syed Fazal Hussain; Maria Wasti; Nouman Ijaz; Hassan Niazi; Adnan Shah; Shahood Alvi; Zhalay Sarhadi; Saleem Mairaj; Saife Hassan; Sajid Shah
- Cinematography: Sofian Khan
- Edited by: Aseem Sinha
- Music by: Debojyoti Mishra
- Distributed by: Geo Films
- Release dates: 20 April 2008 (Tribeca); 1 August 2008 (Pakistan)
- Running time: 103 minutes
- Country: Pakistan
- Language: Urdu
- Budget: Rs. 6.0 crore (US$210,000)

Ramchand Pakistani (Urdu: رام چند پاکستانی) is a 2008 Urdu-language Pakistani drama film directed by Mehreen Jabbar and produced by Javed Jabbar.

The film features Nandita Das, Rashid Farooqi, Syed Fazel Hussain, Maria Wasti and Noman Ijaz in lead roles. The film is based on the true story of a boy who inadvertently crosses the border between Pakistan and India and the following ordeal that his family has to go through. Ramchand Pakistani was also released in India.

== Plot ==
Champa is a Hindu woman left desolate when her young son and husband disappear one day from their village at the India-Pakistan border near Nagarparkar, in the Tharparkar district of Sindh province. The film depicts the crossing of the India–Pakistan border during a period of war-like tension between the two countries in June 2002 by two members of a Pakistani Hindu family belonging to the 'untouchable' Dalit caste, and the extraordinary consequences of this unintended act on the lives of a woman, a man, and their son.

The film centres on a Hindu Dalit family living peacefully in Pakistan. Ramchand, the main protagonist, is an 8-year-old boy and the son of Shankar and Champa. One day, following an altercation with his mother, Ramchand runs away in anger and accidentally crosses the Indo-Pakistan border into India. His father follows him and also crosses the border into India.

After being arrested by border security personnel, they are sent to a prison in India, where they remain for a long time. They soon receive a release order, but it later proves to have been issued in error, and they are sent back to prison. Ramchand, the 8-year-old boy, and his father Shankar remain unregistered prisoners during much of their stay in India. Meanwhile, Ramchand’s mother, Champa, leads a lonely life and, although she takes a temporary job in a distant place, eventually returns to her village.

Finally, after five years, by which time Ramchand has grown older, he is released and returns home to his mother. His father, Shankar, is also released soon afterwards. The family is reunited, and the film ends there.

== Cast ==
- Nandita Das as Champa
- Syed Fazal Hussain as Younger Ramchand
- Navaid Jabbar as Older Ramchand
- Rashid Farooqui as Shankar
- Maria Wasti as Kamla
- Nouman Ijaz as Abdullah
- Adnan Shah as Sharma
- Adarsh Ayaz as Moti
- Farooq Pario as Suresh
- Shahood Alvi as Asif Hussain
- Zhalay Sarhadi as Lakshmi
- Atif Badar as Lalu
- Saleem Mairaj as Vishesh
- Saif-e-Hasan as Murad
- Rao Saleem as Interrogator
- Karim Bux Baloch as Baloch
- Master Yaqub as Baba Gul
- Tahiirz as son
- Hassan Niazi as Deepak
- Kazim Raza as Professor
- Muhammad Rafiq as Bengali
- Sajid Shah as Inspector
- Iqbal Motilani as Maulvi
- Anis Chachar as Captain Saleem

== Film screenings ==
This film had six screenings at the Museum of Modern Art in New York City in 2010.

== Soundtrack ==
The soundtrack is composed by Debojyoti Mishra and include the following songs:

Track	Song	Singers	Composer	Duration
01	Teri Meri Preet	Shubha Mudgal	Debojyoti Mishra	5:34
02	Allah Megh De	Shubha Mudgal & Shafqat Amanat Ali	Debojyoti Mishra	4:41
03	Phir Wahi Raste	Shafqat Amanat Ali	Debojyoti Mishra	5:52
04	Khari Neem Key Neechay	Mai Bhagi	Debojyoti Mishra	5:24
05	Tarrin Paunda	Allan Fakir	Debojyoti Mishra	6:09
06	Meri Maat	Instrumental	Debojyoti Mishra	4:19

== Reception ==
Muniba Kamal of The News on Sunday critiqued the promotional strategy of the film, stating it's been misrepresented as a political drama, whereas it's a heartwarming story of human relationships and emotions but praised Jabbar's direction, particularly in portraying characters and emotions, and applauds performances by Syed Fazal Husain, Navaid Jabbar, Nandita Das, and Maria Wasti, finding the film a "fantastic cinematic experience" and a "great film" that focuses on human aspects of the conflict rather than politics.

== Awards ==
This film won the following awards:

- FIPRESCI Prize from the International Federation of Film Critics at the Osian Film Festival, July, 2008
- Winner of Honourable Mention by the 13th Annual Satyajit Ray Award at the 2008 London Film Festival.
- Winner of Audience Award at the Fribourg International Film Festival, Switzerland, March 2009.
- Winner of Special Mention by the Eucumenical Jury at the Fribourg International Film Festival March 2009.
- Winner of Special Mention by the E-Changer Award at the Fribourg International Film Festival in March 2009
- Ramchand Pakistani won Best Film Award on Pakistan Media Award in 2010.

=== Lux Style Awards ===
Ceremony	Category	Recipient	Result
8th Lux Style Awards	Best Film	Javed Jabbar	Won
8th Lux Style Awards	Best Film Actor	Rashid Farooqui	Nominated
8th Lux Style Awards	Best Film Actor	Syed Fazal Hussain	Nominated
8th Lux Style Awards	Best Film Actress	Nandita Das	Nominated
8th Lux Style Awards	Best Film Actress	Maria Wasti	Won

== See also ==
- Gori temple, the site of Meri Maati song.
- Nagarparkar Bhodesar temple: the site of Tarrin Paunda song.
