= Marina Khan =

Pakistani actress

- ﻣﺭﯾﻨﮧ ﺧﺎﻥ
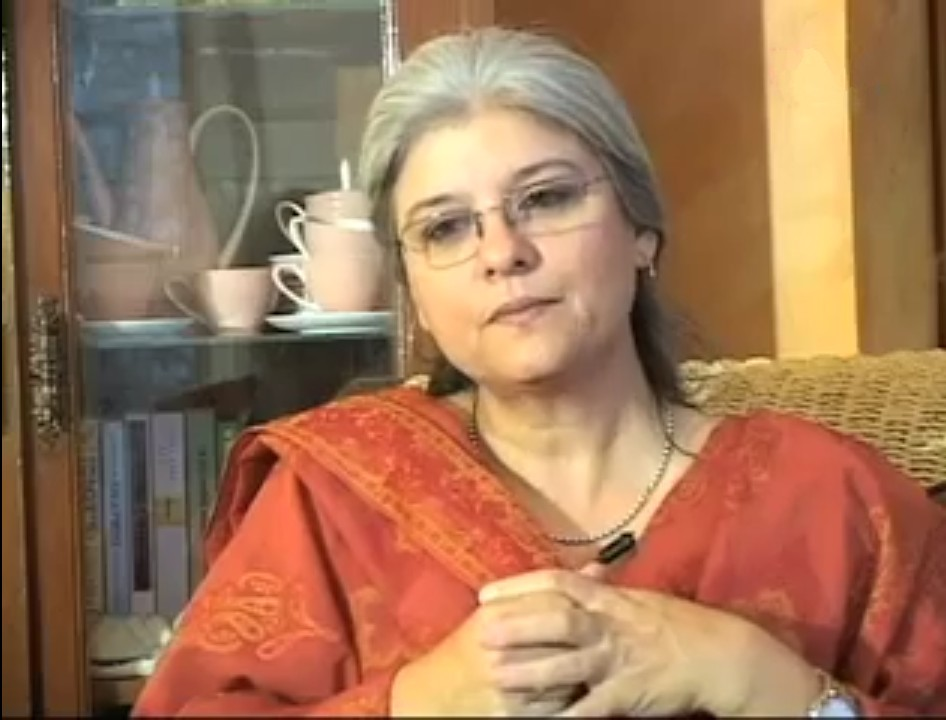
- Khan in 2012
- Born: 26 December 1962 (age 63); Peshawar, KPK, Pakistan
- Occupations: Actress; director; producer; television presenter
- Years active: 1982–present
- Known for: Tanhaiyaan as Sanya Ahmed; Dhoop Kinare as Dr. Zoya Ali Khan
- Spouse: Jalil Akhtar (m. 1989)

Marina Khan (born 26 December 1962) is a Pakistani television and film actress, director, and producer. She is one of the most popular actresses of her time and was one of the most successful actresses of the 1980s and 1990s. Her television shows include Tanhaiyaan (1985), Dhoop Kinare (1987), Kohar (1991), Nijaat (1993), Tum Se Kehna Tha (1995) and Tanha (1997). She went into a hiatus in the mid-2000s and made a comeback on-screen with Tanhaiyan Naye Silsile (2012) which was the sequel to her debut series, Tanhaiyan. Khan made her film debut with a title role in the 2016 drama Lala Begum.

== Early life and family ==
Marina Khan was born on 26 December 1962 in Peshawar, Khyber Pakhtunkhwa province of Pakistan. Her father Rehmat Khan came from a Pashtun family from Tank district, Dera Ismail Khan, while her mother Anna Rehmat was of English descent but settled in Peshawar. She is the granddaughter of Nawab of Tank Nawab Qutubdin Khan. Her father worked for the Pakistan Air Force and the family had to relocate almost every two years depending upon his job assignment. Marina and Kehkashan Awan were childhood friends since their junior school days and both of them went to the Karachi College. In an interview, Khan said that due to constant relocation she did not have long-term childhood friends.

== Acting career ==
=== Television career ===
Khan made her acting debut in the PTV series Nishan-e-Haider, appearing in an episode based on Rashid Minhas Shaheed, Pakistan's national hero from the Indo-Pakistan War of 1971. Her breakthrough performance came in 1985 with the hit series Tanhaiyaan, portraying the lively and materialistic yet sensitive Sanya. Khan has fondly referred to the series as her "all-time favorite" project, crediting it for introducing her to the audience.

The massive popularity of Tanhaiyaan led to the star cast reuniting for another series, the medical-drama Dhoop Kinarey, which aired on PTV. Khan played the role of Dr. Zoya Ali Khan, a carefree and young doctor, in the series.

Khan's subsequent television projects featured her in different roles as a television personality. She took on directing and production roles, and even hosted her own cooking show. In 2007-2008, she hosted the talk show Marina Mornings on ARY Digital.

In 2018, Khan portrayed strict maternal roles in several projects, including Kaif-e-Baharan, Noor ul Ain, and Qaid. She also appeared as a superstitious mother in Dil Kiya Karay. In 2019, her performance of a devoted housewife in the horror-drama Bandish was acclaimed critically. In 2020, Khan played an emotionally charged older mother in the family-drama Aulaad.

=== Film career ===
In 2016, Khan appeared in Mehreen Jabbar-directed short film Lala Begum, premiered at the Mosaic International South Asian Film Festival. Featuring in the titular role, Khan depicted a bitter lady in the film. The following year, she made a cameo appearance in Punjab Nahi Jaungi and had recurring roles in the 2018 releases Na Maloom Afraad 2 and Parwaaz Hai Junoon. Khan played a loveable maternal role in the 2022 release Yaara Vey.

== Personal life ==
Marina married Jalil Akhtar, a producer and director, in 1989.

== Filmography ==
=== Films ===
Year	Title	Role	Notes	Ref(s)
2016	Lala Begum	Meher / Lala Begum		
2017	Punjab Nahi Jaungi	Lady in restaurant	Special appearance	
2018	Na Maloom Afraad 2	Sona		
2018	Parwaaz Hai Junoon	Sania's mother		
2019	Parey Hut Love	Herself	Cameo	
2019	Superstar	Laila Khan		
2021	Khel Khel Mein	Mrs. Haque		
2022	Tich Button	Pammi		
2022	Yaara Vey	Soni		
2023	Teri Meri Kahaniyaan	—N/a	Director; "Pasoori"	
2025	Love Guru			

=== Television ===
Year	Title	Role	Director	Network	Notes	Ref(s)
1982	Nishan-e-Haider	Farhat			Episode "Rashid Minhas Shaheed"	
1985	Tanhaiyaan	Sanya Ahmed				
1986	Show Time	Herself				
1987	Ehsas	Miss Saima				
1987	Dhoop Kinare	Dr. Zoya Ali Khan				
1989	Kaliyan	Herself				
1991	Kohar	Shamin				
1992	Parosi	Roshan Ara "Munni"				
1993	Nijaat	Tanya				
1995	Yun Chaha Tha Magar	Naira				
1995	Tum se Kehna Tha	Hira			Adaptation of While You Were Sleeping	
1995	Bewafaiyan	Rubab				
1997	Khaali Haath	Jiya				
1997	Tanha	Ramsha				
1999	Kaise Kahoon	Hina				
2000	Tum Hi To Ho	Jenny				
2009	Azar Ki Ayegi Baraat	—	Yes			
2010	Dolly ki Ayegi Baraat	—	Yes			
2011	Takkay ki Ayegi Baraat	Dr Fariha Hashim	Yes			
2012	Tanhaiyan Naye Silsilay	Sanya Ahmed	Yes			
2012	Annie Ki Ayegi Baraat	—	Yes			
2014	Jackson Heights	Michelle				
2018	Kaif-e-Baharan	Shaista Fatima				
2018	Noor-ul-Ain	Khizar's mother				
2018	Qaid	Sofia				
2019	Dil Kiya Karay	Romaisa				
2019	Cheekh	Herself			Special appearance in series promo	
2019	Bandish	Madiha Junaid				
2019	Gustakh Ishq	Pari's mother				
2020	Munafiq	Sabiha Begum				
2020	Dil Ruba	Ghazala				
2020	Aulaad	Zakiya				
2020	Meray Dost Meray Yaar Season 2	Zoya's mother			Mini series	
2021	Pardes	—	Yes			
2021	Mein Hari Piya	Fawad's mother				
2022	Mushkil	—	Yes			
2024	Yahya	Sabra				
2025	Dastak		Yes	ARY Digital		
2026	Doctor Bahu			ARY Digital		

=== Telefilms ===
Year	Title	Role	Ref(s)
1996	Farar	Natasha	
1999	Abba, Amma Aur Ali	Misha	
2002	Mere Dost	Teacher	
2002	Lamha	Meher	
2018	Hum Chale Aaye	Nusrat	

=== Reality shows ===
Year	Show	Role	Channel	Notes
1988	Yes Sir No Sir	Guest	PTV	
1999	Kahani Corner	Host	PTV	
2006	Dil Pe Mat Le Yaar	Guest	ARY Digital	Special
2007–2008	Marina Mornings	Host	ARY Digital	Rise & Shine, Summer
2009	Always Girls Can	Host	Broadcast syndication	
2009	Nestle Nesvita Women of Strength '09	Guest	Broadcast syndication	
2009	Kaun Banegi Cooking Queen	Judge	Indus TV	
2009	The Shareef Show	Guest	Geo TV	
2011	Utho Jago Pakistan	Guest	Geo TV	
2018	Breaking Weekend	Guest	ARY Zindagi	
2017	Mazaaq Raat	Guest	Dunya TV	
2020	Bol Nights with Ahsan Khan	Guest	BOL Network	
2020	Good Morning Pakistan	Guest	ARY Digital	

== Awards and nominations ==
Year	Award	Category	Work	Result	Ref(s)
1986	Nigar Award	Best TV Actress	Tanhaiyaan	Won	
2002	1st Lux Style Awards	Best Television Actress	—N/a	Nominated	
1987	PTV Award	Best Actress	Dhoop Kinare	Won	
2023	22nd Lux Style Awards	Lux Changemaker's Award	Contribution to Media Industry	Won	

== See also ==
- List of Pakistani actresses
