= Chup! =

Studio album by Zeb and Haniya
- Released: July 2008
- Recorded: 2007–2008 at Digital Fidelity Studio in Lahore, Pakistan
- Genres: Pop rock, folk
- Length: 48:54
- Label: Fire Records
- Producer: Mekaal Hasan

Alternative cover
- Fire Records Cover

Singles from Chup!
- 1. "Aitebar" Released: December 2008

Professional ratings
Review scores
Source	Rating
Pakistani Music Channel	3.0/5 stars

Chup! (Urdu: چپ, literal English translation: Hush!) is the debut album by the Pakistani female pop duo Zeb and Haniya, released in July 2008. The only single from this album is "Aitebar".

== Concept ==
All the songs are sung in Urdu, except for "Paimana Bitte" which is sung in Pashto and Dari. "Aitebar", the sole single from the album, is accompanied by a music video, directed by Saqib Malik.

== Track listing ==
All music written & composed by Haniya Aslam.

Chup!
No.	Title	Length
1.	"Chup!"	4:09
2.	"Rona Chor Diya"	4:21
3.	"Kabhi Na Kabhi"	5:07
4.	"Paimana Bitte"	4:38
5.	"Kahan"	5:24
6.	"Chal Diye"	5:33
7.	"Ahaan"	5:09
8.	"Seh Na Sakay"	4:03
9.	"Aitebar"	6:20
10.	"Ban Ke Teri"	4:11

== Personnel ==
All information is taken from the CD.

Zeb and Haniya

- Zebunnisa Bangash: lead vocals
- Haniya Aslam: guitars, vocals

Additional musicians

- Guitars and Bass: Shallum Asher Xavier, Omran Shafique, Hamza Jafri, Sameer Ahmad and Kamran Zafar
- Drums and Percussion: John "Gumby" Louis Pinto and Sikander Mufti
- Flute: Mohammad Ahsan Papu
- Trumpet and Goat Horn: Hildegunn Øiseth

Production

- Produced by Mekaal Hasan
- Recorded & Mixed at Digital Fidelity Studio, Lahore, Punjab
