= List of Pakistani films of 2023 =

List of Pakistani films by year 2023

This is a list of Pakistani films that are scheduled to be released in 2023.

== Box office collection ==
The top ten highest-grossing Pakistani films released in 2023, by worldwide box office gross revenue, are as follows.

Background color indicates the current releases

Highest-grossing films of 2023
Rank	Title	Studio	Gross	Ref.
1	Money Back Guarantee	Zashko Films and Game Over Productions	Rs. 26 crore (US$930,000)	
2	Teri Meri Kahaniyaan	SeePrime	Rs. 13.02 crore (US$470,000)	
3	Super Punjabi	SSR & 5Abbi Picture Film Production	Rs. 4 crore (US$140,000)	
4	Huey Tum Ajnabi	Shahid Films	Rs. 2 crore (US$72,000)	

== January–March ==
Opening		Title	Director	Cast	Studio (production house)	Ref.
J A N	13	Rang Ishqay Da	Pervez Kalim	Ali Abbas; Zaria Khan; Iftikhar Thakur; Madiha Shah	United Dreams Films	
J A N	20	Shotcut	Abu Aleeha	Gohar Rasheed; Juggan Kazim; Sana Fakhar; Naseem Vicky	KK Films Productions	
F E B	10	Super Punjabi	Abu Aleeha	Saima Baloch; Nasir Chinyoti; Sana Fakhar; Mohsin Abbas Haider	Pictures & 5 Abbi	
F E B	10	Combativo	Shahzel Syed	Shahzel Syed; Shabbir Shah; Bashir Raja	Shah Productions	

== April–June ==
Opening		Title	Director	Cast	Studio (production house)	Ref.
A P R	21	Money Back Guarantee	Faisal Qureshi	Fawad Khan; Mikaal Zulfiqar; Wasim Akram	Zashko Films, Game Over Productions	
A P R	21	Daadal	Abu Aleeha	Shamoon Abbasi; Adnan Shah; Maira Khan; Mohsin Abbas Haider	Neha Laaj's production	
A P R	21	Dorr	Nadeem Cheema	Shafqat Cheema; Asad Mahmood; Saleem Mairaj; Urooj Chuhdhry; Kamran Mujahid; Waseem Ali; Kamran Mujahid; Hafsa Rajput; Aslam Hassan; Sardar Kamal; Azhar Rangeela; Ameer Ali; Achhi Khan; Ali Khan; Rashid Mehmood; Sidra Noor; Soha	Nadeem Cheema Films, Cosmo Films, HF Films	
A P R	23	Huey Tum Ajnabi	Kamran Shahid	Shamoon Abbasi, Sohail Ahmed, Mehmood Aslam, Shafgat Cheema, Adan Jilani, Mikaal Zulfiqar, Samina Peerzada, Ayesha Omar, Zayn Khan, Sadia Khan, Alyy Khan	Riaz Shahid Films	
J U N	2	Kukri	Abu Aleeha	Yasir Hussain, Ayesha Omar	K K Films	
J U N	28	Teri Meri Kahaniyaan	Nadeem Baig, Marina Khan, Nabeel Qureshi	Babar Ali, Wahaj Ali, Mehwish Hayat, Mawra Hocane, Ramsha Khan, Hira Mani, Irfan Motiwala, Sheheryar Munawar	SeePrime	
J U N	28	Allahyar and the 100 flowers of God	Uzair Zaheer Khan	Ali Zafar, Iqra Aziz, Humayun Saeed, Meera, Bushra Ansari, Anjum Zaidi	3rd World Studios	
J U N	28	VIP	Rana Kamran & Saqib Zafar	Mohammed Ehteshamuddin, Salem Mairaj, Irfan Motiwala, Namrah Shahid	Xpose Films	
J U N	29	Babylicious	Essa Khan	Shehroz Sabzwari, Syra Yousuf, Ankur Rathee, Adnan Jaffar, Aamir Qureshi, Shehzeen Rahat, Sabeena Syed, Laila Wasti	Coconut Production	
J U N	29	Aar Paar	Sameem Daad	Erum Akhtar, Areej Chaudhry, Shamil Khan, Mashood Qadri, Moammar Rana	Kalakaar Entertainment	
J U N	29	Madaari	Seraj us Salikin	Paras Masroor, Ibad Alam Sher, Hammad Siddiq	Enigma Motion Pictures	

== July–December ==
Opening		Title	Director	Cast	Studio (production house)	Ref.
D E C	8	Dhai Chaal	Taimoor Sherazi	Shamoon Abbasi; Ayesha Omer; Humayoun Ashraf; Adnan Shah Tipu	Faisal Production	
D E C	15	Gunjal	Shoaib Sultan	Ahmed Ali Akbar; Amna Ilyas; Resham; Ahmed Ali Butt	Adur Productions	
D E C	22	Chikkar	Zaheer Uddin	Usman Mukhtar; Ushna Shah; Faryal Mehmood; Adnan Shah Tipu; Saleem Mairaj; Nausheen Shah	Dareechay Films	

== See also ==
- List of highest-grossing Pakistani films
- List of highest-grossing films in Pakistan
- Lists of Pakistani films
