= List of Pakistani films of 2019 =

This is a list of Pakistani films released in 2019.

== Highest grossing films ==
The top films released in 2019 by worldwide gross are as follows:

Background color indicates the current releases

Highest-grossing films of 2019
Rank	Title	Studio	Gross	Ref
1	Superstar	Momina & Duraid Films; HUM Films	Rs. 30.05 crore (US$1.1 million)	
2	Parey Hut Love	ARY Films; Salman Iqbal Films; B4U Motion Pictures	Rs. 30.00 crore (US$1.1 million)	
3	Wrong No. 2	Mastermind Films; Geo Films	Rs. 21.65 crore (US$770,000)	
4	Chhalawa	Showcase Films; Hum Films	Rs. 18.90 crore (US$680,000)	
5	Sherdil	NK Pictures; ARY Films	Rs. 12.61 crore (US$450,000)	
6	Baaji	Page 33 Films; ARY Films	Rs. 12.50 crore (US$450,000)	
7	Heer Maan Ja	Geo Films; Distribution Club	Rs. 12.00 crore (US$430,000)	
8	Sirf Tum Hi To Ho	Sangeeta Productions	Rs. 5.00 crore (US$180,000)	
9	Laal Kabootar	Nehr Ghar Films Geo Films	Rs. 3.40 crore (US$120,000)	
10	Kataksha	FlashFilm Productions G Films	Rs. 2.01 crore (US$72,000)	

== Events ==
=== Award ceremonies ===
Date	Event	Host	Location
7 July 2019	18th Lux Style Awards	Fahad Mustafa	Karachi, Pakistan
5 October 2019	7th Hum Awards	Mikaal Zulfiqar	Houston, Texas, United States
7 December 2019	3rd IPPA Awards	Ahmad Ali Butt	Oslo, Norway

== Releases ==
=== January – April ===
Opening		Title	Director	Cast	Production House	Ref
J A N	11	Gumm: In the Middle of Nowhere	Amar Lasani	Sami Khan, Shamoon Abbasi, Shameen Khan, Anjum Habibi, Aleeza Syed	Starstruck Films	
F E B	22	Shanakht	Muhammad Zubair Shaukat	Masood Akhtar, Waseem Akram, Faiz Chohan, Nayyar Ejaz	Double Fire Productions	
M A R	15	Khed Muqadran Di	Naveed Raza	Saima Jan, Madhu, Shams Rana, Sultan Bila, Nayab, Arif Gondal, Mithu Baral, Abida Baig	Moon Productions	
M A R	22	Laal Kabootar	Kamal Khan	Ahmed Ali Akbar, Mansha Pasha, Rashid Farooqui, Syed Mohammad Ahmed	Nehr Ghar Films	
M A R	22	Sherdil	Azfar Jafri	Mikaal Zulfiqar, Armeena Rana Khan, Hassan Niazi, Sabeeka Imam	NK Pictures	
M A R	29	Project Ghazi	Nadir Shah	Humayun Saeed, Sheheryar Munawar, Syra Shehroz, Adnan Jaffar, Talat Hussain	GYR Films	
A P R	12	Junoon e Ishq	Naseem Haider Shah	Adnan Khan, Maahi Khan, Aamir Qureshi, Wajid Zubairi, Aftab Ahmad	Usman Umar Production	

=== May - August ===
Opening		Title	Director	Cast	Production House	Ref
J U N	4	De Te Badmashi Wei	Shahid Usman	Arbaz Khan, Jahangir Khan, Ajab Gul, Asif Khan, Afrin, Laila, Tariq Jamal	Musafir Films	
J U N	4	De Te Loafari Wei	Arshad Khan	Shahid Khan, Arbaz Khan, Jahangir Khan, Sahiba Noor, Laiba, Asif Khan, Shenaz	Shahid Films	
J U N	4	Khandani Gandageer		Arbaz Khan, Shahid Khan, Jahangir Khan, Sahiba Noor, Jiya Ali, Imran Khatak	Bisma Productions	
J U N	5	Chhalawa	Wajahat Rauf	Azfar Rehman, Mehwish Hayat, Zara Noor Abbas, Asad Siddiqui, Mehmood Aslam, Sarwan Ali Palijo	Showcase Films	
J U N	5	Wrong No. 2	Yasir Nawaz	Sami Khan, Neelam Munir, Sana Fakhar, Jawed Sheikh, Shafqat Cheema; Mahmood Aslam	Mastermind Films	
J U N	5	Sharikay Di Aag	Muhammad Yaqoob	Moamar Rana, Khushboo, Haidar Sultan, Jahangir Khan, Shahid, Nawaz Khan, Raheela Agha, Achhi Khan	Umar Production	
J U N	21	Kataksha	Abu Aleeha	Saleem Meraj, Kiran Tabeir, Nimra Shahid Kasim Khan, Mubeen Gabool	Flashfilm Productions G Films	
J U N	28	Baaji	Saqib Malik	Osman Khalid Butt, Amna Ilyas, Mohsin Abbas Haider, Ali Kazmi, Meera, Nayyar Ejaz, Aamir Qureshi	Page 33 Films	
JUL	19	Ready Steady No	Hisham Bin Munawar	Amna Ilyas, Faisal Saif, Zain Afzal, Ahmad Bilal, Ismail Tara, Salman Shahid, Nargis Rasheed	Obsessive Compulsive Dreamers	
JUL	19	Sirf Tum Hi To Ho	Sangeeta	Danish Taimoor, Qurat ul Ain, Mathira, Saim Ali, Sangeeta	Sangeeta Productions	
JUL	26	Tevar	Abu Aleeha	Sukynah Khan, Taqi Ahmed, Mathira, Sharique Mehmood, Akbar Subhani	FlashFilm Productions	
A U G	11	Heer Maan Ja	Azfar Jafri	Ali Rehman Khan, Hareem Farooq, Faizan Shaikh, Abid Ali	IRK Films Arif Lakhani Films	
A U G	11	Parey Hut Love	Asim Raza	Sheheryar Munawar, Maya Ali, Ahmad Ali Butt, Zara Noor Abbas	The Vision Factory Films	
A U G	11	Superstar	Mohammed Ehteshamuddin	Bilal Ashraf, Mahira Khan, Nadeem Baig; Jawed Sheikh	Momina & Duraid Films	

=== September – December ===
Opening		Title	Director	Cast	Production House	Ref
OCT	4	Daal Chaawal	Awais Khalid	Shafqat Cheema, Salman Shahid, Momina Iqbal, Ahmed Sufyan	Fun Club Productions	
OCT	18	Durj	Shamoon Abbasi	Shamoon Abbasi, Sherry Shah, Maira Khan, Nouman Javaid, Dodi Khan, Hafeez Ali	Shaam Films Blunt Digital	
OCT	23	24 Hours	Sharf M.Z.	Muqeet Khan, Fawad Aslam Khan, Asma Nawab, Ali Bhatti, Arshad Khan	Passionedia FZ StratGurus Group	
OCT	25	Kaaf Kangana	Khalil-ur-Rehman Qamar	Sami Khan, Eshal Fayyaz, Ayesha Omer, Fiza Ali, Naseem Vicky	KRQ Productions	
N O V	15	Talash	Zeekay	Noaman Sami, Faria Hassan, Zeb Ahmad, Saleem Mairaj, Adnan Shah Tipu, Mustafa Qureshi	Zeekay Films	
N O V	29	Betabiyan	Abdul Majid Khan	Babar Ali, Hiba Ali, Syed Arez, Jawed Sheikh; Saima Baloch	Prodigy Art Studios	
D E C	20	Sacch	Zulfikar Sheikh	Asad Zaman Khan, Humayoun Ashraf, Elysée Sheikh, Jawed Sheikh, Arisha Razi	Hum Films	
D E C	20	Bau Jee	Amjad Malik	Minhal, Amjad Rana, Zulfi Ali, Shazaib Mirza, Tayyab Ali, Ejaz Baig, Babr Jutt, Lilah Khan	Sky Motion Pictures	
D E C	21	Filmsaaz	Naseer Rind	Sultan Ahmed, Lala Anwar, Naseer Rind	Pawaal Films	
