= Taxali Gate (film) =

2024 Pakistani film

- Directed by: Abu Aleeha
- Written by: Abu Aleeha
- Produced by: Ayesha Omar; Waqas Rizvi
- Starring: Ayesha Omar; Yasir Hussain; Mehar Bano; Nayyar Ejaz; Umer Aalam
- Cinematography: Asrad Khan
- Music by: Ali Allah Ditta
- Release date: 16 February 2024
- Country: Pakistan
- Language: Urdu

Taxali Gate is a 2024 Pakistani crime thriller film directed and written by Abu Aleeha. The film was co-produced by Ayesha Omar, who starred in it alongside Yasir Hussain, Mehar Bano, Nayyar Ejaz and Umer Aalam.

== Plot ==
In the densely packed neighborhood of Taxali, a young woman named Zainab quietly visits her boyfriend, Kamran, the privileged son of powerful politician Chaudhary Shehryar. What starts as a routine meeting turns violent when Kamran and his close friend assault Zainab.

Shattered, she returns home. Her father, Hameed — known locally as Meeda — takes her to the police station to file a report. Their efforts stall almost immediately. Kamran’s political influence is one obstacle, but Meeda’s family ties are another: his brother Shafiq works as a pimp in the nearby red-light district of Heera Mandi, and arrives with Muskaan, a prominent escort from the area and longtime family confidante, to support them.

At first, officers refuse to register the case. They cite procedural delays and unspoken pressure, while judging Meeda for his association with Shafiq and Muskaan because of their professions. Only after the SHO intervenes and overrules his subordinates is the FIR finally registered. The SHO appears principled, but his tone changes once he learns who the accused is.

As word spreads, Chaudhary Shehryar moves fast to protect his son. He offers Zainab’s family twenty lakh rupees to withdraw the case. The offer is blunt and unapologetic. Insulted that his daughter’s trauma is being given a price, Meeda refuses. With the neighborhood watching and rumors spreading, the family decides to seek justice in court.

Barrister Shehla Raza, a respected but cautious lawyer, takes the case. In their first meeting, Shehla warns Zainab that the legal process may deepen her trauma and bring public humiliation. Zainab says nothing and simply nods. Her quiet resolve says enough.

The trial draws public attention. Barrister Yakoob Malik, representing the Chaudharys, aggressively attacks Zainab’s credibility. He uses her family background and connection to Muskaan to question her moral standing. Zainab is visibly shaken during cross-examination but doesn’t back down. In a key session, Muskaan unexpectedly appears in court. Calm but firm, she counters Malik’s insinuations with sharp, direct answers that briefly silence him. Her testimony strengthens Zainab’s case and shifts the courtroom dynamic, casting doubt on the defense’s narrative.

Outside court, pressure builds. Kamran and his friend track Zainab and Muskaan to Muskaan’s home. The meeting turns hostile. Kamran’s friend mocks Muskaan’s profession to belittle her and undermine Zainab. In the heat of the moment, Zainab slaps him. A violent struggle follows. Kamran’s friend is fatally injured. Kamran tries to flee but is overpowered. Rather than report it, Zainab and her family — worn down by failing institutions — take justice into their own hands. In the early morning, they bury Kamran alive next to his friend’s body.

A tense silence follows. Word spreads that the case has quietly collapsed. Zainab, now composed, agrees to withdraw the complaint. Before the next hearing, she meets Chaudhary Shehryar privately and gives him an ultimatum: transfer the full amount to her father, or she will hold a press conference exposing his buried secrets. Knowing the risk, Shehryar pays. Meeda and Shafiq leave the city without ceremony. They have no illusions about justice, but feel they’ve finally reclaimed some control in a system built to deny it.

Days later, Zainab goes to the shrine at Data Darbar. She sits in the outer courtyard, where incense mixes with the call to prayer. An older stranger strikes up light conversation. Elsewhere, Shafiq visits Muskaan at home. The tension of recent weeks is gone. He recites a quiet poem about forgotten cities and surviving storms. Muskaan, wiping a table, pauses to listen. No promises are made, but the moment hints at a chance to start over.

== Cast ==
- Ayesha Omar as Muskaan
- Yasir Hussain as Shafiq
- Mehar Bano as Zainab
- Nayyar Ejaz as Abdul Hameed/ Meeda
- Umer Aalam as Kamran
- Babar Ali as Chaudhary Shehryar
- Iffat Omar as Barrister Shehla Raza
- Alyy Khan as Barrister Yakoob Malik
- Iftikhar Thakur as ASI Saeed
- Sheheryar Cheema as Babar Jatt

== Music ==
The background score of the film was composed by Bilal Allahditta and Ali Allahditta and the songs were composed and produced by Ali Allahditta. "Mera Haq Kidhar Hai" was the lead anthem of the film performed by Eva B. "Akhir Jind Hai Apni" was performed by Yashal Shahid

== Production ==
The film was shot in Lahore's Taxali Gate, and the shooting was wrapped in May 2023. Omar, who was the co-producer of the film as well, shared that the crew wanted to keep the film's details under wraps till the major portions of the film were shot. Abu Aleeha told a local publication that the film, a combination of dark humour and tragedy with the locales of Heera Mandi, revolves around the investigation and events surrounding a murder.

The official teaser of the film was released on 9 January 2024, and the official trailer was released on 19 January.

== Release ==
The film was theatricality released on 16 February 2024.

Special free of cost screenings for women on the occasion of International Women's Day were held in Karachi's Cinepax Ocean Mall, Islamabad's Cinepax Jinnah Park and Lahore's Cinepax Packages Mall. The full length version of the film titled 'Director's cut' was slated to release in April 2024 on Eid-ul-Fitr.

== Reception ==
=== Critical reception ===
Mohammad Kamran Jawaid of Dawn praised the film for the acting performances of Ayesha Omer, Alyy Khan and Babar Ali but noted the rushed screenplay and some technical flaws in direction. Sara Danial of DAWN Images praised the performances of Omer, Khan and Yasir Hussain, the background score and Aleeha's portrayal of the societal issues, but noted the rough flow of the film. While reviewing for The Express Tribune, Manahil Tahira noted the performances of the lead actors and Eva B's background score but criticised it for its technical flaws. In a review for VOA Urdu, Omair Alavi praised the cast performances, especially Omer, Bano, and Hussain, tight runtime, dialogues and filming of the historic Heera Mandi area, but critiqued the film for TV drama-style opening titles, lack of any dance number despite the Heera Mandi setting, and poor editing choices.
