= Tevar (2019 film) =

- تیور
- Directed by: Abu Aleeha
- Written by: Abu Aleeha
- Produced by: Ali Sajjad Shah
- Starring: Sukaina Khan; Taqi Ahmed; Mathira; Shariq Mehmood; Akbar Subhani
- Music by: Ali Allahditta
- Production company: FlashFilm Productions
- Release date: 26 July 2019
- Country: Pakistan
- Language: Urdu
- Budget: Rs. 7.5 million

Tevar is a 2019 Pakistani action, revenge-thriller film. It is written and directed by Abu Aleeha and produced by Ali Sajjad Shah. The film features Sukaina Khan, Taqi Ahmed, Mathira, Shariq Mehmood and Akbar Subhani in pivotal roles.

== Cast ==
- Sukaina Khan
- Akbar Subhani
- Mathira
- Taqi Ahmed
- Sharique Mehmood

== Production ==
The working title was Arifa.

== Music ==
The film features the song "Mohay Rung De" by Amir Khusrow and Sajid Abbas and performed by Abbas.

== Reception ==
A review in Dawn panned the film, finding it "unsurprisingly minimalistic (as all [of Abu Aleeha's) films are), and yet, after his last endeavour Kataksha, surprisingly well-made". A review on Pakistanicinema.net was very critical of the film.

== See also ==
- Cinema of Pakistan
- Lollywood
- List of highest-grossing Pakistani films
- List of Pakistani films of 2019
