= Huang Yong =

Huang Yong may refer to:

- Huang Yong (murderer) (1974–2003), Chinese serial killer
- Huang Yong (footballer) (born 1978), Chinese footballer
