= Bhanwar (2026 TV series) =

2026 Pakistani television series

- Written by: Rida Bilal
- Directed by: Abu Aleeha
- Starring: Mansha Pasha; Asad Siddiqui; Areeka Haq
- Country of origin: Pakistan
- Original language: Urdu

Production
- Production location: Pakistan
- Production companies: Full Frame Productions; Alpha Productions

Original release
- Network: Express Entertainment
- Release: 3 June – 27 August 2026

Bhanwar is a 2026 Pakistani television drama series directed by Abu Aleeha and written by Rida Bilal. The series stars Mansha Pasha, Asad Siddiqui and Areeka Haq in prominent roles. It premiered on Express Entertainment on 3 June 2026.

== Plot ==
The series explores the misuse of digital technology, including online harassment, cybercrime, identity theft and blackmail. Its narrative connects the experiences of several women whose lives are affected by online exploitation. An investigative journalist attempts to uncover the people responsible for these incidents, leading him into a wider investigation involving digital deception and manipulation.

== Cast ==
- Mansha Pasha as Shaheen
- Asad Siddiqui
- Areeka Haq
- Laiba Rehman
- Ali Safina as Haris
- Ismat Zaidi
- Saleem Mairaj
- Saima Qureshi
- Hina Rizvi
- Shehzad Malik

== Production ==
The series was produced under the banners of Full Frame Productions and Alpha Productions. Rida Bilal wrote the screenplay, while Abu Aleeha directed the production.

Mansha Pasha portrayed Shaheen, a widowed mother who operates a home-based food business. Her storyline examines the difficulties faced by women seeking financial independence and the risks associated with online business dealings.

== Reception ==
The series received coverage for its portrayal of cybercrime and the exploitation of women through digital platforms. Dawn discussed its suspense-driven narrative and the characters' involvement in scams and trafficking-related schemes.
