= Ru Baru =

Pakistani TV series

- Title Screen
- Genre: drama Romance
- Written by: Hoor Shumail
- Directed by: Saife Hassan
- Starring: Saira Yousuf; Faizan Khawaja; Adnan Siddiqui
- Music by: Furqan and Imran
- Opening theme: Main Jeeliya
- Country of origin: Pakistan
- Original language: Urdu
- No. of episodes: 16

Production
- Producer: Momina Duraid
- Production locations: Karachi, Islamabad
- Editor: Adeel Khalid
- Running time: 35–45mins (up to 60–70 mins without TV commercial)
- Production company: Momina Duraid Productions

Original release
- Network: Hum TV
- Release: 9 January 2014 – 2014

Ru Baru (transl. Face-to-Face) is a Pakistani television drama series that aired on Hum TV, written by Hoor Shumail, produced by Momina Duraid, directed by Saife Hassan. Furqan and Imran provided background music. It featured Syra Yousuf, Adnan Siddiqui and Faizan Khawaja as leads. The series premiered on 9 January 2014, with the prime slot on the network.

== Plot ==
The series revolves around Shabeeh, a young orphan girl who resides with her maternal grandmother, two uncles, and their respective families. The series starts with Shabeeh's cousin Tipu, who lives in the same house as of Shabeeh, returning from Turkey after his graduation with his friend Sarmad.

Shabeeh is an introvert and spends her time in art work. Her cousins, Tipu and Kiran love each other and want to get married, but her grandmother would like to see Shabeeh engaged before they marry. Her family receives a proposal from her uncle Jameel's friend's son, Usman, and they get engaged. One day, while visiting Tipu, Sarmad see Shabeeh and convinces Tipu that he likes her and wants to marry her. Tipu sees Sarmad as a better match for Shabeeh, and convinces his family to break off Shabeeh's engagement with Usman and have her marry Sarmad.

After Shabeeh's marriage with Sarmad, she realizes that he has severe mood swings and psychological issues. On their wedding night, he drags her out of the house and leaves her outside in the cold all night. Sarmad often wakes up screaming while sleeping and blames Shabeeh for ruining his life. One day, he eventually reveals to her that her mother had ruined her life and shows her pictures of her mother and his father together. Intrigued and confused, Shabeeh seeks Sarmad's uncle and legal guardian, and asks him about Sarmad's parents.

The story goes in flashback, Sarmad's father, Taimoor loves Shabeeh's mother, Neelam who is his student in university in Turkey. Neelam struggles for what she wanted most in her life, Taimoor. Even though Taimoor was married and had a son, Neelam kept persuading him to leave his wife. Taimoor's Wife couldn't see him having an affair with Neelam so she becomes depressed. Neelam goes back to Pakistan and there her parents get to know her relationship with Taimoor, they are very upset because of this and her brother forces her to marry who ever will bring her a proposal. Neelam's mother tells him not to force her and wait for better proposal but he doesn't agree and she is married right away to a not so good looking guy. She doesn't love him even though her husband loves and cares for her a lot. Taimoor decides to come to Pakistan because he couldn't live without Neelam and his wife becomes extremely depressed and becomes mentally disturbed and that is how she falls from upstairs and dies. After her death Taimoor tells Neelam to leave her husband and marry him. Initially, Neelam refuses as she is pregnant. Neelam very cleverly takes divorce and leaves her husband and marries Taimoor and leaves her new born daughter, Shabeeh to her husband. On knowing this her husband commits suicide by shooting himself with a gun on his head and her child is given back to Neelam' mother to care of her. Sarmad who is very young at the time, saw his mother dying in front of him and he becomes mentally disturbed and has mental issues. When Neelam lives with them her treatment with Sarmad is very harsh and it affects Sarmad and later he gets required to go to psychiatrist. Sarmd's father dies as Sarmad had planned to add poison in Neelam's tea but father drinks it and dies. On seeing this Neelam kills herself by drinking the tea which has poison. Sarmad in later years is brought up by his uncle. This was the story of Shabeeh's mother in the past and how Sarmad had become what he was in present. Shabeeh struggles and goes through a very hard time with Sarmad.

== Cast ==
- Syra Yousuf as Shabeeh & Neelam
- Adnan Siddiqui as Taimoor, Sarmad's Father
- Faizan Khawaja as Sarmad, Shabeeh's Husband
- Saba Faisal as Tipu's Mother
- Behroze Sabzwari as Jameel, Tipu's father and Shabeeh's Uncle
- Sultana Zafar as Jameel's mother, Shabeeh's Grandmother
- Tipu Shareef as Tipu
- Shameen Khan as Kiran
- Tabassum Arif as Salima, Kiran's mother
- Mehwish Hayat as Seema, Sarmad's Mother
- Palwasha Yousuf as Annie
- Saleem Mairaj as Karam-din
- Madiha Imam as Neha, Sarmad's ex-fiancé
- Hanzala Shahid as Young Sarmad
- Atif Badar as Parvaiz, Shabeeh's father

== Broadcast ==
The series originally peremied on 9 January 2014 on Hum TV, airing a weekly episode.

It broadcast in India on Zindagi in 2015.
