= Fasaana Mart Ka =

2026 Pakistani television series

- Genre: Comedy; Drama; Family
- Written by: Mansoor Saeed
- Directed by: Abu Aleeha
- Creative director: Sami Qahar
- Starring: Shuja Asad; Aena Khan; Faryal Mehmood; Omair Rana; Qudsia Ali; Saad Zameer
- Country of origin: Pakistan
- Original language: Urdu
- No. of seasons: 1

Production
- Cinematography: Shahzad Baloch
- Production companies: Multiverse Entertainment; Stimulus Productions Worldwide

Original release
- Network: Green Entertainment
- Release: February 2026

Fasaana Mart Ka (also spelled Fasana Mart Ka) is a 2026 Pakistani television comedy-drama series. The series is set in a supermarket in Karachi and follows the lives of its employees and customers during Ramadan. It features Shuja Asad, Aena Khan, Faryal Mehmood, Omair Rana, Qudsia Ali and Saad Zameer in prominent roles.

== Plot ==
The series revolves around employees working at a supermarket in Karachi during Ramadan. Its storyline explores their professional and personal interactions, alongside everyday challenges and relationships within the workplace.

== Cast ==
- Shuja Asad
- Aena Khan
- Faryal Mehmood
- Omair Rana
- Qudsia Ali

== Production ==
The story is set primarily inside an Imtiaz Supermarket outlet in Karachi.

== Reception ==
In its review published on 15 March 2026, Dawn described the series as having a reasonable script and some entertaining performances. The review praised the pairing of Aena Khan and Shuja Asad, as well as the performances of Faryal Mehmood and Omair Rana. However, it criticised the show's slow pacing, direction and limited focus on the characters' lives outside the supermarket. It also noted the prominent presence of product sponsorships in the series.
