= Peechay Tou Dekho =

- Directed by: Syed Atif Ali
- Written by: Muhammad Yasir
- Produced by: Syed Atif Ali
- Starring: Yasir Hussain; Sarah Khan
- Edited by: Salman Tehzeeb
- Production company: Screenshots Productions
- Release date: 17 June 2022 (Pakistan)
- Country: Pakistan
- Language: Urdu

Peechay Tou Dekho is a Pakistani horror-comedy film. It is written and directed by Syed Atif Ali, co-written by Muhammad Yasir, and edited by Salman Tehzeeb. The film features Yasir Hussain and Sarah Khan. It was released on 17 June 2022.

== Plot ==
Peechay Tou Dekho is a horror comedy that revolves around two friends who, out of curiosity, visit a haunted house. There, they encounter a lady witch, played by Waqar Hussain, who lives with two girls.

== Cast ==
- Yasir Hussain
- Aadi Adyeal Amjad
- Waqar Hussain
- Sarah Ali Khan
- Junaid Akhter
- Aamir Qureshi
- Malik Raza
- Sharique Mehmood
- Asghar Khoso
- Sarwan Ali Palijo
- Yasir Taj
- Nawal Saeed
- Hammad Siddiqui

== Production ==
Peechay Tou Dekho was filmed in Karachi. Yasir Hussain confirmed that the film was shot in Karachi. The director Syed Atif also confirmed the shooting areas. The film was shot in various parts in Karachi. Eveready Pictures and Screenshots Productions are the production companies.

There are five songs in the film. Four of them are composed by A.Q Artisan, written by Shamim Bazil and sung by Misaal Zaidi, Martina and A.Q Artisan and one song is written, composed and produced by Noman Jalal.

== Reception ==
Faisal Ali from PAK Cinema reviewed it as: It attempts to offer a unique horror-comedy experience with strictly middling results.
