= Taha Malik =

American record producer (born 1987)

- Born: Taha Malik
- Other name: KOSTAL
- Occupations: Record producer; rapper; singer; songwriter; film music director; musical artist
- Musical career
- Genres: Hip hop; Funk; R&B; Pop; Folk; Soul; Film Score; Experimental
- Instruments: Drum machine; keyboards; synthesizer; bass guitar; piano; sampler; vocals
- Years active: 2003–present
- Label: Independent
- Website: www.tahamalik.com

'Taha Malik was born on 31 March 1987, in the United States. He is a Pakistani-American record producer, musician, rapper, and Film score composer. On completing his formal education, he began his career as a record producer.

== Early life ==
During high school, Malik began exploring music-making on a desktop computer at home. In high school, he was DJing. He got a RadioShack MIDI keyboard and a Roland MC-909. This was the turning point in my career in music production. Still, Malik does not define his music as "electronic music." He says: "I like experimenting...I like to bend genres."

== Career ==
=== Advertising ===
Malik has worked with Ogilvy and Mather as music director, strategist, and consultant, and with multinational brands. Malik has produced content television, radio, and digital campaigns. He has worked with longtime collaborator Adnan Malik, and filmmakers Ahsan Rahim, Kamal Khan, Asim Raza, and Sharmeen Obaid-Chinoy.

=== Cinema ===
In 2019, Malik created songs in the films Laal Kabootar and Baaji. Malik's singing in Laal Kabootar was described by Something Haute as "power-packed vocals." According to the Express Tribune: "Laal Kabootar isn't only an impressive visual experience but its sound and production design further break new ground.

Laal Kabootar has been selected as Pakistan's official submission for the 92nd Academy Awards (Oscars), and is a candidate for nomination in the best International Feature Film category. Laal Kabootar (The Red Pigeon) was screened at the 2020 Palm Springs International Film Festival in California. It was also screened at the Singapore International Film Festival and won best feature at the Vancouver International South Asian Film Festival.

=== TV/Digital ===
In 2020, Malik wrote the original music score for YouTube's Season 1 of "Fundamental. Gender Justice. No Exceptions," which has been nominated for two DayTime Emmy Awards in 2021.

=== Installations ===
In 2017, Malik contributed to HOME 1947, an exhibition in collaboration with the British Council, Citizens' Archive of Pakistan, and Sharmeen Obaid. "Before arriving in Karachi, Home 1947 was showcased in Manchester in July, followed by Mumbai in August and Lahore in October."

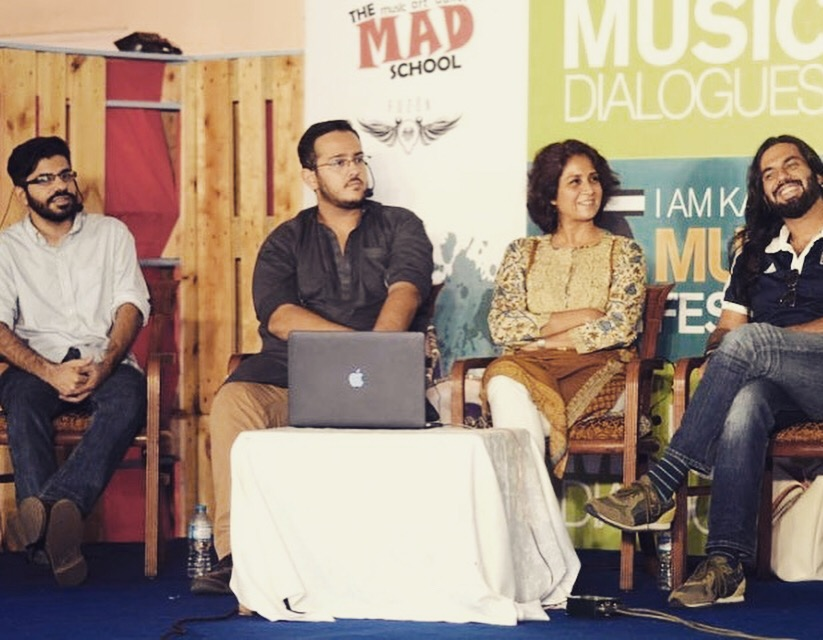
Malik discussing film and music, alongside Azaan Sami, Ayla Raza, and Babar Sheikh in Karachi.

== Credits ==
=== Filmography ===
- It's a Wonderful Afterlife (Remix)
- Jalaibee
- Ho Mann Jahaan
- Janaan
- Laal Kabootar
- Baaji

=== Discography ===
Year	Title	Network	Notes
2003	Street Beats Vol. 1.	Bootleg ft. RDB
2004	Labh Janjua: The King
2010	Mauj: Now in Technicolor.	Fire Records
2010	Stereo Nation: Twist & Shout	Universal Records

=== Singles ===
- Jaan Jaye ft. Lil Mike (2005)
- Aajana ft. Najam Sheraz (Remix)
- Nahi Hai Yeh Pyar ft. Haroon
- Holi Holi ft. Stereo Nation & Bohemia
- Jalaibee ft. Umair Jaswal
- Laal Kabootar ft. Zoe Viccaji
- Jugart ft. Jabar Abbas
- Raag Murli ft. Mai Dhai
- Sanwal ft. Sanam Marvi
- Khilti Kali ft. Zeb Bangash
- Gangster Guriya ft. Sunidhi Chauhan
- Baby, Take It Easy ft. Sajjad Ali
- Churails ft. Zoe Viccaji

=== Television ===
Year	Title	Role	Notes
	Mangoes Series		Canada
2016	Lux Style Awards	Music Director
2016	Hum Style Awards	Music Director
2020	Churails		Original series on ZEE5
