= Yasir Hussain =

Pakistani actor and screenwriter

- یاسر حسین
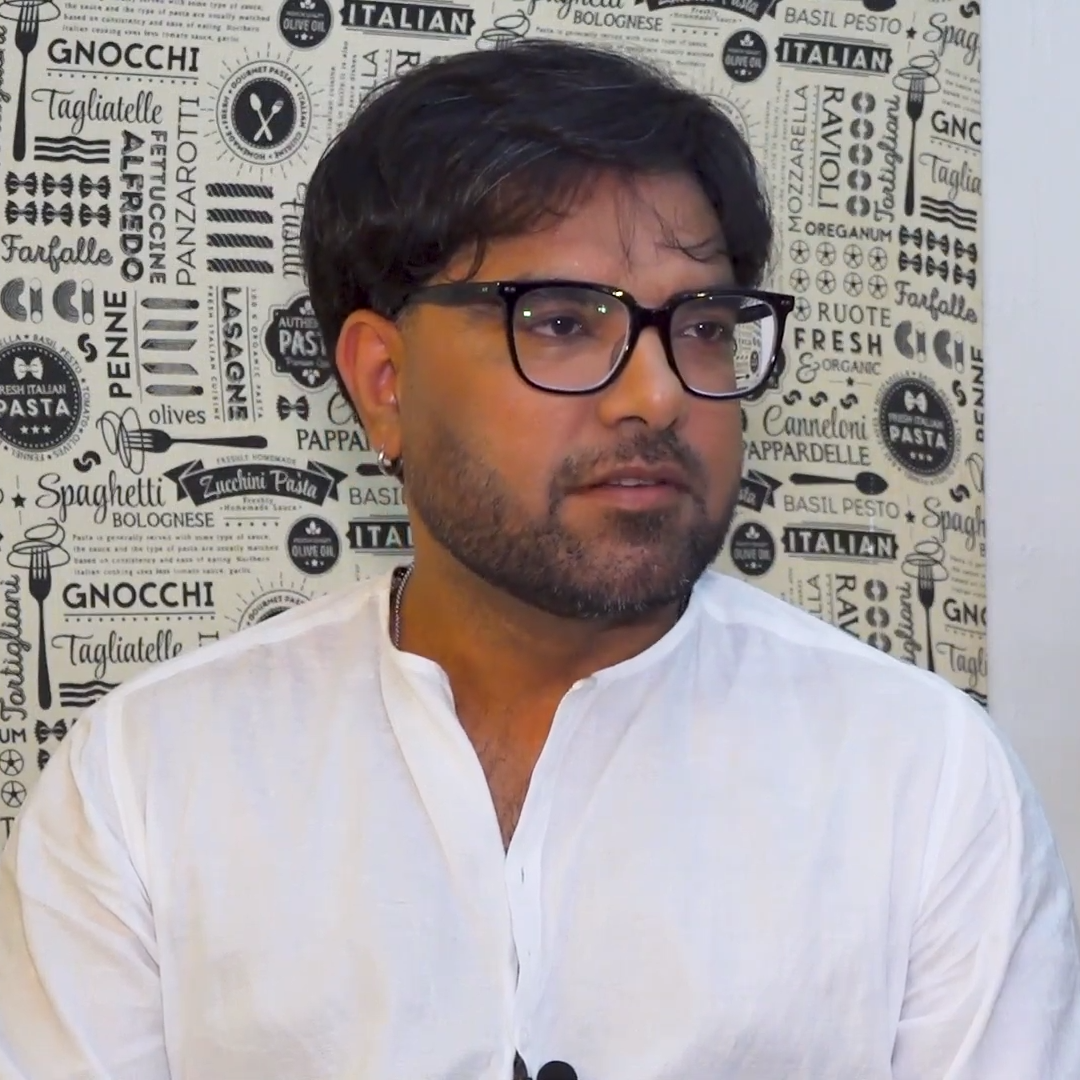
- Hussain in 2024
- Born: Karachi, Pakistan
- Occupations: Actor; Director; VJ; host; Screenwriter; Playwright
- Years active: 2010–present
- Spouse: Iqra Aziz (m. 2019)
- Children: 2

Yasir Hussain (Urdu: یاسر حسین) is a Pakistani screenwriter, actor, director, playwright and host from Karachi best known for his comic roles. He hosted The After Moon Show on Hum TV. He is also known for playing the antagonist in the 2018 social drama Baandi.

== Early life and family ==
Hussain was born in Karachi into a Rajput family originally from Azad Kashmir that moved to Rawalpindi when he was five.

He's the youngest in a family of twelve siblings, including a sister who's a Dubai-based singer, Schumaila Hussain, and a brother who's a scriptwriter. In recent years, Schumaila has gained attention for singing the OSTs of dramas Muqabil (2016) and Khamoshi (2017-2018) while she has also done works for Lollywood and Bollywood.

== Career ==
=== Theatre ===
Hussain remains associated with Kopycats Production as they produced some of the great plays for theatre which were written by Anwar Maqsood like Half Plate, Pawney 14 August, Sawa 14 August and Saichin and the most popular Aangan Terha in which Yasir Hussain played the role of Akbar which was originally played by Salim Nasir.

=== Cinema ===
Hussain made his Lollywood debut as Moti in the film Karachi Se Lahore (2015) written by himself and directed by Wajahat Rauf. He reprised his role as Moti in Lahore Se Aagey (2016) was a spin-off to Karachi Se Lahore and was released on 11 November 2016.

=== Television ===
Hussain has acted in television serials including sitcom Coke Kahani (2012) and drama serial Dareecha (2011-2012). He appeared in multiple telefilms and a drama serial Shaadi Mubarak Ho (2017), opposite Kubra Khan, directed by Wajahat Rauf and written by Yasir Hussain himself.

He has been noted for his role as an antagonist in drama serial Baandi (2018-2019).

He made his directorial debut with the drama serial Koyal (2021-2022).

=== Host ===
Beginning in 2018, Hussain hosted two seasons of The After Moon Show.

== Personal life ==
Yasir Hussain publicly proposed to TV actress Iqra Aziz at the Lux Style Awards. They were married in Karachi on 28 December 2019.

== Controversies ==
=== Jokes about Pathans ===
Yasir Hussain has received criticism from Pathan community for mocking their language Pashto and trying to elicit racist responses from audiences toward Pathan jokes.

=== Comments about Turkish actors ===
Yasir Hussain was also criticized for his unwelcoming attitude towards Turkish actors and actresses when they came to act in Pakistani ads. He got trolled on every post for his fights but some celebrities agreed he was being bullied and the trolling was getting too much.

== Filmography ==
=== Films ===
| Year | Title | Role | Screenwriter | Notes |
|---|---|---|---|---|
| 2015 | Karachi Se Lahore | Moti | Yes | Film debut |
| 2016 | Ho Mann Jahaan | | Dialogues only | |
| 2016 | Lahore Se Aagey | Moti | Yes | |
| 2017 | Arth 2 | | | Special appearance |
| 2019 | Chhalawa | | Yes | |
| 2019 | Baaji | | | Special appearance |
| 2022 | Parde Mein Rehne Do | | | Special appearance |
| 2022 | Peechay Tou Dekho | | | |
| 2022 | Chaudhry – The Martyr | Kashan | | |
| 2023 | Kukri | Javed Iqbal | | |
| 2024 | Taxali Gate | Shafiq | | |

=== Television series ===
| Year | Title | Role | Director | Screenwriter | Network | Ref(s) / Notes |
|---|---|---|---|---|---|---|
| 2012 | Coke Kahani | Beydil | | | Numerous channels | |
| 2012 | Dareecha | Shahrukh Khan | | | ARY Digital | |
| 2012 | Kiya Life Hai | John | | | ARY Digital | |
| 2014 | Happily Married | Multiple guest appearances | | | ARY Digital | |
| 2017 | Shadi Mubarak Ho | Nyle | | Yes | ARY Digital | |
| 2017 | Baaghi | Sami Ahmad (guest appearance) | | | Urdu1 | |
| 2018 | The After Moon Show | Host | | | Hum TV | |
| 2018 | Baandi | Tahawar | | | Hum TV | |
| 2020 | Jhooti | Ali | | | ARY Digital | |
| 2021 | Koyal | No | Yes | | Aaj Entertainment | |
| 2022 | Badshah Begum | Pir Qaiser | | | Hum TV | |
| 2022 | Aik Thi Laila | Inspector Sajid | Yes | | Express Entertainment | |
| 2024 | Inspector Sabiha | Inspector Sajid | | | Express Entertainment | |
| 2025 | Paradise | No | Yes | Yes | Express Entertainment | |
| 2025 | Case No. 9 | News anchor | | | Geo Entertainment | |

=== Theatre ===
| Year | Title | Role |
|---|---|---|
| 2008 | Bombay Dreams | |
| 2008 | Come Again | |
| 2013 | Aangan Terrha | Akbar |
| 2013 | Ponay 14 August | |
| 2013 | Sawa 14 August | Sindhi politician; Pashtun poet |
| 2013 | Halfplate | Mirza Nafees Barelvi |
| 2013 | Siachein | |
| 2019 | Naach Na Jaanay | Akbar |
| 2025 | Monkey Business | Waseem, Mrs. Waseem, Bachan sahab |

=== Telefilms ===
| Year | Title | Role | |
|---|---|---|---|
| 2012 | Family Man | Mohsin | Hum TV |
| 2014 | Arranged Shadi ki Love Story | Haider | Hum TV |
| 2015 | Tum Milay Ho Yoon | Jamal | Hum TV |
| 2016 | Dilwali Dulha Le Jayegi | Aadi | Hum TV |
| 2017 | Aisa Bhi Hota Hai | Shoukat | Hum TV |
| 2017 | Dildarian | Dildar Hussain | Hum TV |
| 2017 | Zor Laga Kay Haiyya | Wajdan | Hum TV |
| 2018 | Photocopy | Faraz | Aaj Entertainment |
| 2018 | Band Toh Baje Ga | Amir | Hum TV |
| 2019 | Help Me Durdana | Dino/Durdana | ARY Digital |
| 2022 | Siwaiyaan | Ahsan | ARY Digital |
| 2023 | Daku Bangaya Gentleman | Sawal Daku/Sunny | ARY Digital |

== Awards and nominations ==
| Year | Ceremony | Category | Project | Result |
|---|---|---|---|---|
| 2016 | 15th Lux Style Awards | Best Supporting Actor in a Film | Karachi Se Lahore | Nominated |
| 2017 | 16th Lux Style Awards | Best Lead Actor in a Film | Lahore Se Aagey | Nominated |
| 2019 | 7th Hum Awards | Best Actor in a Supporting Role | Baandi | Won |
| 2019 | 7th Hum Awards | Best Actor in a Negative Role | Baandi | Nominated |
| 2023 | 22nd Lux Style Awards | Best Television Director | Aik Thi Laila | Nominated |
| 2023 | 22nd Lux Style Awards | Best Television Actor - Critics' choice | Aik Thi Laila | Nominated |
