= Baaji (2019 film) =

- Theatrical release poster
- Urdu: باجی
- Directed by: Saqib Malik
- Written by: Irfan Ahmed Urfi
- Story by: Irfan Ahmed Urfi
- Produced by: Saqib Malik; Angeline Malik
- Starring: Meera; Osman Khalid Butt; Amna Ilyas; Mohsin Abbas Haider; Ali Kazmi; Nayyar Ejaz
- Edited by: Adnan Ali Khan
- Music by: Taha Malik
- Production company: Page 33 Films
- Distributed by: ARY Films
- Release date: 28 June 2019
- Running time: 132 minutes
- Country: Pakistan
- Language: Urdu
- Budget: Rs. 60 million (US$210,000)
- Box office: Rs. 125 million (US$450,000) (Domestic)

Baaji (transl. elder sister) is a 2019 Pakistani romantic drama film, directed by Saqib Malik and produced by his Production company Page 33 Films. The film features Meera as Shameera, Osman Khalid Butt as Rohail Khan/ Khalid Osman, Amna Ilyas as Neha, Mohsin Abbas Haider as Ajji, Ali Kazmi as Rammy, Nayyar Ejaz, and Nisho in pivotal roles. It is a dramatic tale of a fading Lollywood actress Shameera (Meera), who is not accepting that now her position in the industry is not valuable. The story revolves around the relationship of Shameera with a Salon girl Neha (Amna Ilyas) who later becomes an assistant of Shameera and makes this opportunity happen to work with an American-based Pakistani Director Rohail Khan (Osman Khalid Butt). Neha who belongs to a conservative lower-middle-class family then also make herself involved in Shameera's comeback movie titled Waapsi by helping them in rehearsals and script making so far she gets a chance to take a supporting role in the movie. The film includes Ali Kazmi as Raamy (Shameera's Boyfriend) who is highly aggressive about Shameera. Mohsin Abbas Haider plays the love interest of neha's character, while the Legendary actor Nayyer Ejaz supports the film by his great comics and unforgettable role as Chand Kamal, film also includes numerous well-known faces from the industry as in cameo appearances.

== Cast ==
- Meera as Shameera
- Osman Khalid Butt as Rohail Khan
- Amna Ilyas as Neha
- Mohsin Abbas Haider as Ajji
- Ali Kazmi as Rameez Aslam (Rammy)
- Nayyar Ejaz as Chand Kamal
- Nisho as Dilshad Aapi
- Irfan Khosat as Stage Owner
- Ruhi Khan as Neha's Mother
- Nirvaan Nadeem as Neha's brother
- Aamir Qureshi as Police Inspector

== Cameos ==
- Mehwish Hayat as herself
- Mahnoor as Item Girl
- Ali Saleem as Begum
- Ayesha Sana as Salon Owner
- Humayun Saeed as himself
- Zeb Bangish as herself
- Yasir Hussain as Director
- Sania Saeed as Neha's Lawyer
- Mustafa Qureshi As Pehalwaan
- Tapu Javeri as himself
- Tariq Amin as himself
- Frieha Altaf as herself
- Ali Azmat as himself
- Angeline malik as herself
- Juggan Kazim as herself
- Deepak Perwani as himself
- Muhammad Mubarik Ali as himself

== Release ==
The first look teaser of the film was released on 23 April 2019. The teaser was highly appreciated by audiences on every social media platform and received millions of shares on various sites. Later, the Theatrical trailer, published on 30 May 2019, truly inspired cinema lovers all around. Critical response was also appreciative and in support of the film. The response from the general audiences changes right after the release of controversial song Gangster Guriya, however the Mehwish Hayat featured song controversy was sort of blessing in disguise for the movie, as films gets a huge public response on its release. The film was released on 28 June 2019 under the banner of ARY Films nationally and was also had an international release by B4U Films. Baaji wasn't the first film which was distributed internationally by B4U Films as other Pakistani films such as Rangreza, Janaan, 7 Din Mohabbat In, Cake were also released by the same banner.

=== Home media ===
Baaji was made available for streaming on Amazon Prime Video in United States and United Kingdom in August, 2020. The film had a Television Premier on Eid al-Fitr, 26 May 2020, on ARY Digital.

== Reception ==
=== Box office ===
The film collected 0.9 crores on its opening day and 0.95 crore on its second day. On its third day it collected 0.95 crore making a total gross of Rs 2.80 crores by the end of its opening weekend. It collected Rs 2.10 crores by the end of its second weekend. After the end of its run it earned Rs 12 crores domestically. The film was declared a commercial success.

=== Critical reception ===
Hassan Hassan of Galaxy Lollywood rated the film 3.5 out of 5 stars saying that "Baaji may just be the best cinematic work that portrays Lollywood's forgotten cinematic heritage on a colorful yet a dark palette". He praised the performances of Meera and Ilyas.

== Soundtrack ==
The soundtrack for the 2019 film Baaji, composed by Taha Malik, offers a vibrant mix of original compositions and stylish reimaginings of Pakistani classics, including a disco-infused take on Runa Laila's "Don't Be Silly" in "Khilti Kali" and a jazzy rendition of Naheed Akhtar's "Yeh Aaj Mujhko Kya Hua." Featuring a diverse vocal lineup that spans Zeb Bangash, Sunidhi Chauhan, Naseebo Lal, and Osman Khalid Butt, the album balances soulful, trance-like numbers like "Badlaan" with high-energy, foot-tapping tracks such as "Gangster Guriya," all while maintaining a contemporary yet nostalgic flavor that complements the film's bold narrative.

| No. | Title | Singer(s) | Length |
|---|---|---|---|
| 1. | "Khilti Kali" | Taha Malik feat. Zeb Bangash & Osman Khalid Butt | 03:19 |
| 2. | "Badlaan" | Zeb Bangash & Saad Sultan | 03:30 |
| 3. | "Gangster Guriya" | Taha Malik feat. Sunidhi Chauhan | 02:53 |
| 4. | "Ik Tu" | Zeb Bangash & Saad Sultan | 01:43 |
| 5. | "Ye Aaj Mujh Ko Kya Hua" | Jamal Rahman feat. Natasha Noorani & Aima Baig | 02:49 |
| 6. | "Shaam Nasheeli" | Zeb Bangash & Saad Sultan | 02:09 |
| 7. | "Tak Way" | Naseebo Lal | 06:31 |
| Total length: | | | 22:54 |

== Accolades ==
| Date of ceremony | Award | Category | Recipient(s) and nominee(s) | Result | Ref. |
|---|---|---|---|---|---|
| December 31, 2020 | Lux Style Awards | Best Film | Saqib Malik / Page 33 Films | Nominated | |
| December 31, 2020 | Lux Style Awards | Best Director | Saqib Malik | Nominated | |
| December 31, 2020 | Lux Style Awards | Best Actress | Meera | Nominated | |
| December 31, 2020 | Lux Style Awards | Best Actress | Amna Ilyas | Nominated | |
| December 31, 2020 | Lux Style Awards | Best Playback Singer | Zeb Bangash ("Gudi Wang") | Nominated | |

== See also ==
- List of Pakistani films of 2019
- Baaji (1963 film)
