= The After Moon Show =

Pakistani television series

- Written by: Umer Mukhtar, Yasir Taj
- Directed by: Asad Buksh
- Presented by: Yasir Hussain
- Opening theme: Asim Azher
- Original languages: Urdu; English
- No. of seasons: 2
- No. of episodes: 28

Production
- Executive producer: Maimoona Siddiqui
- Producer: Kaleem Khan
- Production location: Karachi
- Running time: 40 minutes

Original release
- Network: Hum TV
- Release: 10 February – 24 November 2018

The After Moon Show was a Pakistani prime time talk show hosted by Yasir Hussain on Hum TV. The show premiered on 10 February 2018. It was produced by Hum Television Network. The show was Yasir Hussain's debut as a television host.

== Seasons ==
Season 1 of the show premiered on 10 February 2018 and concluded on 17 June 2018 with an Eid Special finale episode. Season 2 started on 14 July 2018 in the same time slot.

== Format ==
The show was divided into six segments. Chit Chat Couch Session had Yasir in conversation with the guests. Chai Ya Thanda challenged celebrities with interesting riddles and they were given brain boosters if they got stuck. The Puppet segment had a puppet character who liked to share jokes which were silly but he thought they were funny. Kathera was a segment where celebrities had to stand in a katehra (witness box) and clarify funny accusations put on them by the public which were asked by Yasir. Urta Teer was another segment where rapid fire questions were aimed at celebrities who had to give quick answers. Two Minutes of Fame invited a new singer on every show who had a chance to showcase his talent.

== Episodes ==
=== Season 1 ===
Episode No	Guest
Episode 1	Sanam Jung & Adnan Siddiqui
Episode 2	Soniya Hussain & Asim Azhar
Episode 3	Humayun Saeed & Kubra Khan
Episode 4	Hareem Farooq & Ali Rehman Khan
Episode 5	Iqra Aziz & Shahzad Sheikh
Episode 6	Imran Abbas & Reema Khan
Episode 7	Zara Noor Abbas & Asad Siddiqui
Episode 8	Nadia Khan & Azfar Rehman
Episode 9	Sanam Saeed & Aamina Sheikh
Episode 10	Bushra Ansari & Aijaz Aslam
Episode 11	Maya Ali & Osman Khalid Butt
Episode 12	Aiman Khan & Minal Khan
Episode 13	Urwa Hocane & Mawra Hocane
Episode 14	Best Of The Season Episode (BTS)
Episode 15	Ayeza Khan & Danish Taimoor

=== Season 2 ===
Episode No	Guest
Episode 1	Hania Amir & Mohsin Abbas Haider
Episode 2	Ayesha Omar & Hina Dilpazeer
Episode 3	Sanam Baloch & Shoaib Akhtar
Episode 4	Sarah Khan & Agha Ali
Episode 5	Sania Saeed & Sarmad Khoosat
Episode 6	Mahira Khan & Mikaal Zulfiqar
Episode 7	Javed Sheikh & Shaista Lodhi
Episode 8	Veena Malik & Yasir Nawaz
Episode 9	Vaneeza Ahmad & Anwar Maqsood
Episode 10	Sami Khan & Momal Sheikh
Episode 11	Aima Baig & Momina Mustehsan
Episode 12	Sarwat Gillani & Wasim Akram
Episode 13	Asad Siddiqui, Asim Azhar & Iqra Aziz

== Reception ==
The show garnered positive response from the public and critics. It is termed as a "light hearted evening show". From episode 1 the ratings were high enough to beat competitive channels including ARY Digital and GEO TV.
