= Young Malang =

- Film poster
- Directed by: Rajdeep Singh
- Screenplay by: Rajdeep Singh; Manshendra Kailey
- Story by: Manshendra Kailey
- Produced by: Rahulinder Singh Sidhu
- Starring: Yuvraj Hans; Vinaypal Buttar; Balli Riar; Neetu Singh; Anjana Sukhani; Anita Kailey
- Cinematography: Anshul Chobey
- Edited by: Omkar Nath Bhakri
- Music by: Sanjoy Chaudhry; Anjan Biswas
- Production companies: RSG Studios; Glimpse Motion Pictures
- Release date: 20 September 2013
- Running time: 140 minutes
- Country: India
- Language: Punjabi

Young Malang is a 2013 Punjabi language Indian romantic comedy film, directed by Rajdeep Singh, written by Manshendra Kailey and produced by Rahulinder Singh Sidhu. The film stars Yuvraj Hans, Neetu Singh, Vinaypal Buttar, Anita Kailey, Balli Riar and Anjana Sukhani, and debuted on 20 September 2013. Singers Mika, Javed Ali, Shafqat Amanat Ali and three actors in the movie, Yuvraj Hans, Balli Riar and Vinaypal Buttar, sung the songs in the flick. The film marks singer Balli Riar's debut in Punjabi films.

== Cast ==
- Balli Riar as Jaskaran Brar
- Yuvraj Hans as Jazz
- Vinaypal Buttar as Kashmeer Singh
- Anita Kailey as Annie
- Neetu Singh as Brittany Begowal
- Anjana Sukhani as Kiran
- Yograj Singh as Maulla Jatt
- Chacha Raunki Ram as Prof. Laathi
- Leena Sidhu
- Mathira as Dancer in the Song ''Lakk Ch Current''
- Kiran Kumar
- Tej Sapru
- Aryajeet Sapru
- Sunita Dhir

== Production ==
It was announced in April 2013 that filming had commenced and would continue on primary locations in Chandigarh, Zirakpur, Kasauli, Himachal Pradesh, with some shooting taking place in Italy. Producer Rahulinder Singh Sidhu, who made a career change from politics to film production with this project, explained the spirit behind the film's name, stating "It's not just a title; it's a state of mind. Those who are young will relate to it and those who are not so young will be able to take a nostalgic trip down the memory lane".

== Release ==
Young Malang was theatrically released on 20 September 2013.

=== Home Media Release ===
For the digital audience, the movie is available for streaming on the Chaupal OTT platform.

== Music ==
The songs of this film were sung by Mika, Javed Ali, Shafqat Amanat Ali, Sonu Kakkar, and J Riaz, along with the songs by the heroes of the film Yuvraj Hans, Balli Riar & Vinaypal Buttar. Young Malang introduced the trio of Raptilez 1O1, the Punjabi Rap Group that "rocked the nation" with their appearance on India's Got Talent.

=== Soundtrack ===
1. "Young Malang", Singer: Mika Singh, Music: Gurmeet Singh, Lyricist: Daljit Singh
2. "Chori Chori", Singer': Javed Ali, Music: Vicky Bhoi, Lyricist: Rajdeep Singh
3. "Hawa Vich Mehkan", Singer: Vinaypal Buttar, Music: Gurmeet Singh, Lyricist: Vinaypal Buttar
4. "Ishq Di Kitaab", Singer: Gurmeet Singh, Music: Gurmeet Singh, Lyricist: Sandy Kharal
5. "Sapno Ka Saya", Singers: Vicky Bhoi, Yuvraj Hans, Vinaypal Buttar, Raptilez 1O1, Music: Vicky Bhai, Lyricist: Gurjinder Dhillon, Raptilez 1O1
6. "Rabb Janda Hai", Singer: J Riaz, Music :Gurmoh Lyricist: Gurjeet Khosa
7. "Ishq Di Kitaab", Singer: Navraj Hans, Music: Gurmeet Singh, Lyricist: Sandy kharal
8. "Doli", Singer: Vicky Bhoi, Music: Vicky Bhai, Lyricist: Gurjinder Dhillon
9. "Preetma", Singers: Vicky Bhoi, Shallu Jain, Music: Vicky Bhai, Lyricist: Prem Chand
10. "Lakk Ch Current", Singer:

== Reception ==
The first review to come out for the film was mixed where the reviewer gave the film 3 stars. The reviewer wrote "Technically, the film will surprise you", offering that the film was "on par with any Bollywood film". They noted that the film's producer, "has left no stone unturned in giving the film a grand look and together as a team, producer and director have employed some of the best technicians for the film." The reviewer concluded, "Overall, Very Good!"
