= Furqan and Imran =

Pakistani musical band

Furqan and Imran عمران اور فرقان
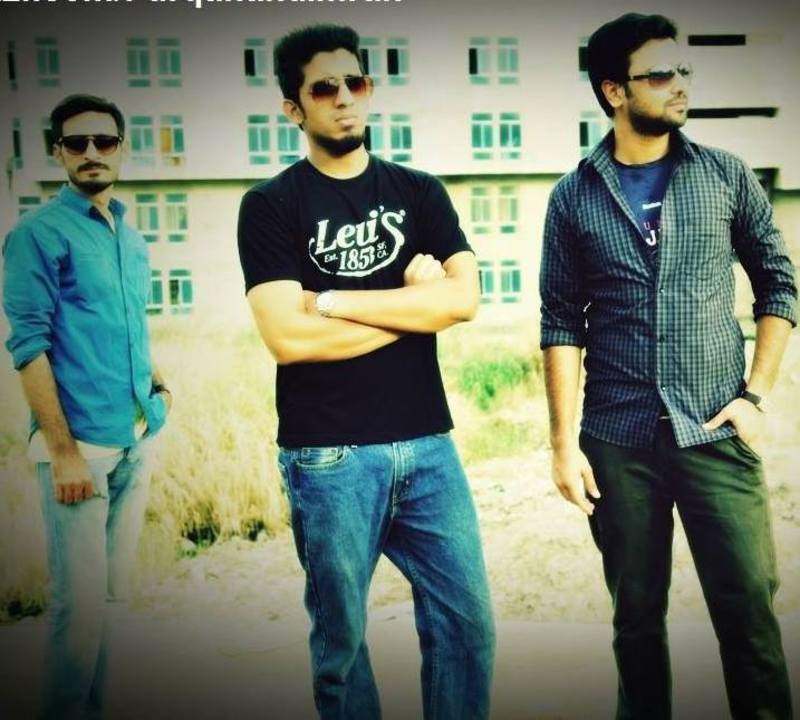
- From right to left: Imran Butt, Furqan Tunio and Anas Imtiaz, Karachi, 2015.

Background information
- Origin: Karachi, Pakistan
- Genres: Pop; Rock; Classical
- Years active: 2013–Present
- Labels: Flash and Bang Productions
- Website: www.reverbnation.com/fnimusic

Furqan and Imran (Urdu: فرقان اور عمران), commonly known as F&I) is the Pakistani musical band from Karachi which originated in 2013. The band mainly covers genres like Rock, Pop and Classical. The founding members of the band are Imran Butt as vocalist and Furqan Tunio as guitarist/lyricist/composer

== History ==
The band released its first song "Main Jeeliya" in 2013, after some time it was selected for the soundtrack of the drama serial Ru Baru produced under the banner of Moomal Productions on Hum TV.

The band released their second track "Piya Re" in 2014 by featuring Pakistani actress Mathira on it, by paying the tribute to Adnan Sami Khan's song "Bheegi Bheegi Raaton Mein". The band also produced a mashup cover track by combining two famous songs from India and Pakistan, "Teri Deewani" by Kailash Kher and "Awari" by the band Soch.

== Band members ==
- Imran Imtiaz Butt - vocals (2013–present)
- Furqan Hussain Tunio - Lead guitar, lyrics / composition (2013–present)

== Discography ==
=== Singles ===
- Main Jeeliya
- Main Jeeliya OST Ru Baru
- Piya re feat. Mathira
- Teri Deewani/Awari cover

== See also ==
- List of Pakistani music bands
