= Laal Kabootar =

2019 Pakistani Urdu-language film

- Laal Kabootar film poster
- Directed by: Kamal Khan
- Screenplay by: Ali Abbas Naqvi
- Produced by: Kamil Chima Hania Chima Syed Falak
- Starring: Ahmed Ali Akbar; Mansha Pasha; Rashid Farooqui
- Music by: Taha Malik (music director); Danial Hyatt (background music)
- Production company: Nehr Ghar Films
- Distributed by: Geo Films
- Release date: 22 March 2019
- Running time: 102 min
- Country: Pakistan
- Language: Urdu
- Box office: Rs. 3.40 crore (US$120,000)

Laal Kabootar (Urdu: لال کبوتر, lit. 'Red Pigeon') is a 2019 Pakistani action crime thriller film directed by Kamal Khan, produced by Hania Chima and Kamil Chima, and written by Ali Abbas Naqvi. Taha Malik is the music director while Danial Hyatt, son of Rohail Hyatt, provides the background score. The film features Ahmed Ali Akbar, Mansha Pasha, Rashid Farooqui, Raza Gillani, Syed Mohammad Ahmed, and Ali Kazmi. The film was released on 22 March 2019.

Laal Kabootar's TV premiere was on 31 August 2019 on Geo Entertainment. It was Pakistan's official entry for the 92nd Academy Awards, but it was not nominated.

== Plot ==
When Alia's (Mansha Pasha) husband, Noman Malik (Ali Kazmi), is murdered in a brutal target killing in Karachi, she seeks answers and revenge. Up against a lazy justice system, as well as a social structure that isn't kind to single women, she pushes ahead in fury. Finally, she comes across Adeel (Ahmed Ali), a cab driver with his own set of troubles. Adeel's dreams of going to Dubai aren't materializing, even though he indulges in petty crimes. He offers to help Alia find her husband's killer in return for money. Alia offers double in return if he kills the assassin instead. Left with no choice, Adeel starts to try and find the assassin with the help of other criminals around him.

Alia reaches out to Inspector Ibrahim (Rashid Farooqui), a corrupt police officer who doesn't seem much interested in her case and instead mocks her for struggling to find the assassin. However, the inspector is investigating a case involving Adeel on the other side, resulting in a raid on his house that he narrowly escapes. The two cases become connected when it's discovered that a business tycoon is behind all these crimes. A greedy Inspector Ibrahim arranges a meeting with him and tries convincing him for a bribe, but the man rejects his offer and gives him a measly 5000 rupees, asking him to leave. Infuriated, Ibrahim smashes his car's windows and puts forth his demand: if he isn't paid 20 million, he will now charge the man with murder and land theft.

On the other hand, Adeel finally tracks down Noman's assassin. He poses as an innocent man visiting his place, but the assassin already has a trap planned for him. Adeel is threatened to be killed unless he reveals Alia's identity but he stays steadfast and doesn't do so. As the assassin is about to kill him, Adeel reveals a hidden pistol and shoots one of the men in the leg, causing panic. He manages to shoot the assassin through the ear as well and narrowly escapes.

The business tycoon sends gangsters to attack Inspector Ibrahim's house who survives but his daughter is killed in the confusion, leaving the inspector completely heartbroken. Enraged and hopeless, he plans a grand attack on the tycoon's mansion, and sneaks in with a lot of police. However, they discover that the man already has a lot of security in place.

An injured Adeel is taken to the hospital, where Alia arrives to face the assassin who is looking for her. She narrowly escapes him, but he catches up and starts strangling her. Adeel crawls out of his bed but unable to help, he is left with no other choice than to start the smoke alarms. The assassin is distracted for a while, giving Alia enough time to get free. A weak Adeel tries to fight the assassin but is knocked out. However, not before he pushes the assassin, making him drop his gun. Alia swoops at it, and shoots the assassin dead, her mission complete.

The police and the business tycoon's security ensue an elaborate battle which seems to be in the hands of Inspector Ibrahim's forces but slowly, the guards turn the tide and both sides suffer heavy losses. However, Ibrahim is able to shoot both the man and his son, completing his revenge, before he himself is shot in the back and collapses.

The film ends with phone footage showing Noman and Alia's happy memories together, before cutting off to Adeel seemingly enjoying his life in Dubai. He then records a video message for Alia saying he thinks life in Dubai is fun, but he can't fit in, and will return to Karachi soon.

== Cast ==
- Ahmed Ali Akbar as Adeel Alam
- Ali Kazmi as Noman Malik
- Mansha Pasha as Aaliyah Malik
- Syed Mohammad Ahmed
- Rashid Farooqui as Inspector Ibrahim
- Mojiz Hasan as Mugged Passenger
- Shamim Hilaly as Aliya's mother
- Saleem Mairaj as Asad
- Syed Arsalan as Monu
- Hammad Siddiq as Irshad
- Ishtiaq Omar as Sandeep
- Kaleem Ghour as Shani
- Faiza Gillani as Nasreen

== Production ==
=== Filming ===
Laal Kabootar was filmed in Karachi. Ahmed Ali Akbar confirmed that the film was shot in Karachi.

== Release ==
The trailer of Laal Kabootar was released on 18 March 2019. Many teasers of Laal Kabootar came in February and Ahmed Ali Akbar himself visited many cinemas to promote the film.

=== Home media ===
Laal Kabootar had the world television premiers on 31 August 2019 on Geo Entertainment at 8:00 PST.

== Reception ==
=== Box office ===
After its first week it earned Rs. 1.30 crore, while the numbers went to Rs. 2.11 cr after its second week, Rs. 2.41 cr at the end of the third week, and Rs. 2.91 cr at the end of the fourth week.

=== Critical reception ===
Laal Kabootar opened to roaring applause and critical acclaim from both the audience and critics alike.

Rahul Aijaz of The Express Tribune rated 5 out of 5 stars. While praising the film's cast he wrote, "Akbar and Pasha make a formidable on-screen pair. The former's finally getting the limelight he deserves and the latter is only beginning to tap into her potential." He further praised the direction and cinematography and marked, "Khan, on the other hand, oversees the project to perfection and let the film breathe on its own. Stunningly shot by acclaimed cinematographer Mo Azmi, the film shows how camera can play an active ‘character’ in the film." and concluded that "Laal Kabootar will make you regain your faith in Pakistani cinema. Must watch!."

Namrata Joshi of The Hindu praised the film for its gritty portrayal of Karachi's class conflicts, drawing parallels with South Korean actioners and Bollywood's Mumbai noir, and commended the strong performances by the cast especially Rashid Farooqui's, and the film's music.

== Soundtrack ==
All lyrics are written by Taha Malik, Sabir Zafar; all music is composed by Taha Malik.

| No. | Title | Singer(s) | Length |
|---|---|---|---|
| 1. | "Jugart" | Taha Malik | 2:55 |
| 2. | "Raag Murli" | Mai Dhai | 3:07 |
| 3. | "Sanwal" | Sanam Marvi | 4:15 |

== Accolades ==
| Date of ceremony | Awards | Category | Result | Ref(s) |
|---|---|---|---|---|
| September 2019 | Washington DC South Asian Film Festival | Best Actor Male – Ahmed Ali Akbar | Won | |
| October 2019 | Tasveer South Asian Film Festival | Archana Soy Audience Award for Best Feature Film – Laal Kabootar | Won | |
| 17 November 2019 | Vancouver International South Asian Film Festival | Best Feature Film – Laal Kabootar | Won | |
| 31 December 2020 | Lux Style Awards | Best Film – Laal Kabootar | Won | |
| 31 December 2020 | Lux Style Awards | Best Actor (Viewers' Choice) – Ahmed Ali Akbar | Won | |
| 31 December 2020 | Lux Style Awards | Best Actor (Critics' Choice) – Rashid Farooqui | Won | |
| 31 December 2020 | Lux Style Awards | Best Director – Kamal Khan | Won | |
| 31 December 2020 | Lux Style Awards | Best Playback – Taha Malik ("Jugart") | Nominated | |
| 31 December 2020 | Lux Style Awards | Best Playback – Mai Dhai ("Raag Murli") | Nominated | |
| 31 December 2020 | Lux Style Awards | Best Actress – Mansha Pasha | Nominated | |

== See also ==
- List of Pakistani films of 2019
- Ahmed Ali Akbar
- List of submissions to the 92nd Academy Awards for Best International Feature Film
- List of Pakistani submissions for the Academy Award for Best International Feature Film
