= Mohabbat Rooth Jaye Toh =

- Title screen
- Also known as: Ruswaiyaan in India
- Genre: Drama
- Written by: Faiza Iftikhar
- Directed by: Roomi Insha
- Starring: Humayun Saeed; Mahnoor Baloch; Adnan Siddiqui
- Theme music composer: Ifti
- Opening theme: Song written & performed by Ifti
- Composer: Ifti
- Country of origin: Pakistan
- Original language: Urdu
- No. of episodes: 19

Production
- Editors: Mahmood Ali; Salman Masood
- Running time: ~40 minutes

Original release
- Network: Hum TV
- Release: 29 May – 2 October 2011

Mohabbat Rooth Jaye Toh (Urdu: مُحبت رُوٹھ جاۓ تو) (Transl. If love turns away) is a Pakistani drama which aired on Hum TV from 29 May 2011 to 2 October 2011.

This drama was also selected for Indian Channel Zindagi and ran from 11 June 2015 Mon-Sat 10:00pm under the title "Ruswaiyaan".

== Story ==
This serial tackles head-on the many cultural traditions – such as child marriage and marriage to the Quran and honour killings – that continue to plague women in our society. Zain, Shumail and Shahnawaz are friends who live abroad. Shahnawaz loves Shumail but after her rejection he goes back to Pakistan where his parents force him to marry his childhood fiancée. However, Shahnawaz runs away before the wedding and in due course Shumail too confesses her love and they get married, and move abroad. Meanwhile, Shahnawaz's sister Bhaag Bhari is made to marry the Quran. And his brother is killed by a rival family. Shahnawaz visits his father, who forces him into a second marriage with a girl from the family of the killer for revenge. He agrees on the condition that he is permitted to take Bhag Bhari with him, but discovers too late that his father has plans that lead to the destruction of their lives. Shahnawaz marries the girl without even looking at her until the wedding night where he learns she is an 8-year-old girl. He asks his mother but she couldn't explain anything except asking him to go back to Shumail. But his father choked her sister to death to prevent Shahnawaz from taking her away and when Shahnawaz and his mother found out they were devastated. Shahnawaz took off with the girl and left for Karachi where he left her with a Sister Veronica, he knew and promised to take care of her expenses and studies. He returned to Shumail but when he got the news of her pregnancy he got worried that he, as his father's blood, would treat her daughter the same. So he made Shumail abort the child but regretted it later after Shumail was heartbroken on that. This incident along with all others in Pakistan made Shahnawaz cut off from everyone. 10 years passed and one day Shahnawaz asked Shumail to leave him and marry their friend Zain(Adnan Siddiqui), who is divorced, and be mother to his daughter. And subsequently told about the abortion he caused. Shumail did not divorced him but got angry and Shahnawaz returned to Pakistan. There he found out, his parents died, his sister has been regarded as a peer, and her grave is famous as a mazaar. After stopping those ceremonies on her sister's grave, he went to Karachi for the girl he married, Mariam(Syra Yousuf). After taking the sister's permission he took her in his home to Karachi where he started living and doing a job. Mariam was fascinated and had developed a respect for Shahnawaz as she knew he was his only relative from childhood, though she didn't know the relation. Her friend Asad(Azfar Rehman) wanted her to marry her, though she didn't love him that way. Her constant efforts made Shahnawaz happier and even smile that he had stopped long before. But Shumail who decided to divorce Shahnawaz got hold of his diary and got to know how he suffered all these years so she came back to him in Pakistan. On meeting Mariam she thought her as the child he adopted and also accepted her as her guardian. Mariam accepted Asad's marriage proposal but Shahnawaz rejected Asad knowing his family belongs to Zamindari. Mariam accepted his decision but Shumail got suspicious. Later she found his nikaahnama and told mariam about it, but Mariam was overjoyed and confessed she has romantic feelings for Shahnawaz since he saw him but now she knows why. Shahnawaz told Mariam he loves her just as a guardian nothing else, and he loves only Shumail. He told Shumail everything and with the help of Sister Veronica, they also made Mariam understand Shahnawaz's reasons and made her sign the divorce papers. Later Asad met Shahnawaz and made him realise not all families are stereotyped and his family has woman at successful places. Shahnawaz after this accepted his proposal and thus show ends on a happy note.

== Cast ==
- Humayun Saeed as Shahnawaz. The eldest son of Chaudhary Rabnawaz. Husband of Shumail
- Mahnoor Baloch as Shumail
- Adnan Siddiqui as Zain, Shahnawaz and Shumail's friend
- Rashid Mehmood as Shahnawaz's father, Chaudhry Rabnawaz
- Azra Aftab as Shahnawaz's mother
- Sunita Marshall as Shahnawaz's sister.
- Azfar Rehman as Asad
- Syra Yousuf as Mariam, Shahnawaz's second wife.
- Rashid Mehmood as Chaudhary Rabnawaz. Father of Shahnawaz
- Raju Jamil as Shumaila's father
- Humaira Zaheer as Shumaila's mother
- Naima Khan
- Sohail Umer
- Agha Waheed
- Taj Niazi
- Nasreen Jan
- Saima Kanwal
- Durdana Butt as Sister Veronica, a nun at a boarding school where Mariam lives

== Reception ==
Iftikhar's script received critical acclaim due to the sensitive portrayal of several issues such as marriage to Quran and child marriages, and writer's other perspections.
