= Super Punjabi =

- Poster
- Directed by: Abu Aleeha
- Screenplay by: Abu Aleeha
- Story by: Abu Aleeha
- Produced by: Safdar Malik; Iftikhar Thakur
- Starring: Saima Baloch; Mohsin Abbas Haider; Iftikhar Thakur; Nasir Chainyoti; Rukhma Maryam; Adnan Shah Tipu
- Cinematography: Arsad Khan
- Edited by: Sheraz Mehboob
- Music by: Dr. Zeus; Ajaydeep Sindhu; Sami Khan
- Production companies: Pictures & 5 Abbi; Eveready Pictures
- Distributed by: Eveready Pictures
- Release date: 12 May 2023
- Country: Pakistan
- Language: Punjabi

Super Punjabi is a 2023 Pakistani Punjabi-language comedy drama film written and directed by Abu Aleeha and produced by Muhammad Safdar Malik and Iftikhar Ahmed Thakar. It stars Saima Baloch, Mohsin Abbas Haider, Iftikhar Thakur, Nasir Chinyoti, Rukhma Maryam, Adnan Shah Tipu.

== Cast ==
- Mohsin Abbas Haider
- Saima Baloch
- Iftikhar Thakur
- Sana Fakhar
- Nasir Chanioti
- Rukhma Maryam
- Saleem Albela
- Goga Pasrori
- Nawaz Anjum
- Goga Pasrori

== Release ==
Super Punjabi was released internationally on 12 May 2023, across 860 screens in Pakistan and overseas. Prior to its theatrical premiere, the film's trailer and music were launched at a promotional event in Lahore.

== Reception ==
=== Critical response ===
Writing for Dawn, Mohammad Kamran Jawaid gave "Super Punjabi" a mixed review, calling it a lighthearted and family-friendly comedy superior to director Abu Aleeha's earlier dark works. He commended the performances of Mohsin Abbas Haider, Nasir Chanioti, and Iftekhar Thakur, but criticized the predictable storyline and lead female performances.

Writing for Youlin Magazine, Muhammad Suhayb noted that "Super Punjabi" is specifically tailored for Punjabi-speaking audiences, praising its music, cinematography, and stage-style comedic performances. However, Suhayb criticized the film for its half-baked plot, weak screenplay, and inconsistent pacing, which he felt diminished the overall cinematic experience.
