= Siwaiyaan =

- Genre: Thriller, Comedy, Mystery
- Written by: Bilal Atif Khan
- Directed by: Bilal Atif Khan
- Starring: Sonya Hussyn; Yasir Hussain
- Music by: SK Salman Khan
- Country of origin: Pakistan
- Original language: Urdu

Production
- Producers: Fahad Mustafa; Ali Kazmi
- Production company: Big Bang Entertainment

Original release
- Network: ARY Digital
- Release: 4 May 2022

Siwaiyaan (Urdu: سویّاں, lit. 'Vermicelli') is a Pakistani telefilm that released on Eid ul Fitr 2022 on ARY Digital. It is directed by Bilal Atif Khan in his directorial debut who also wrote the film. It stars Sonya Hussyn and Yasir Hussain in leading roles.

== Plot ==
The telefilm revolves around a household where the wife mistakenly kills a person and then tries, with her husband's help, to hide the dead body from the guests who have come to celebrate Eid with them.

== Cast ==
- Sonya Hussyn
- Yasir Hussain as Ahsan
- Nayyar Ejaz
- Saife Hassan
- Zeba Shehnaz as Ahsan's grandmother
- Hina Rizvi as Rani

== Production ==
The telefilm is the debut of Bilal Atif Khan as a director and writer. The film is produced by Big Bang Entertainment. Hussain revealed in conservation with DAWN Images that script is heavily inspired by Ray Cooney's work.
