= Mahnoor (stage actress) =

Pakistani actress

Mahnoor is a Pakistani stage actress and dancer. She has also appeared in some films and dramas. She married a businessman.

== Career ==
She started her acting career with the PTV drama Mausam. Then she acted in the Al-Falah Theatre for almost a year. She also performed in the Tamaseel Theatre, Shalimar Theatre, Mehfil Theatre, Alhamra Arts Council, and other theatres of Punjab.

Her notable appearances in films include Sher Dil (2012), Halla Gulla (2015), Geo Sar Utha Kay (2017), and Junoon-e-Ishq (2019), and in television include, Mausam, Mammy, Afsar Bekar-e-Khas and Hum Sub Umeed Se Hain.

== Filmography ==
#	Year	Title	Director	Language	Notes
1	2012	Sher Dil	Iqbal Kāshmiri	Punjabi	debut
2	2014	Lafanga	Naseem Haidar Shah	Punjabi	leading role
3	2015	Halla Gulla	Kamran Akbar Khan	Urdu	
4	2017	Geo Sar Utha Kay	Nadeem Cheema	Urdu	
5	2019	Junoon-e-Ishq	Naseem Haidar Shah	Urdu	
6	2019	Baaji	Saqib Malik	Urdu	
