= Monkey Business (play) =

Pakistani play

- Original language: Urdu
- Written by: Yasir Hussain
- Genre: Farce Comedy

Premiere
- Date: 5th April 2025
- Directed by: Yasir Hussain
- www.instagram.com/monkeybusinesstheplay

Monkey Business is a Pakistani farce comedy stage play written and directed by Yasir Hussain. It was produced by Sajeel Meer Kazmi and Asiyah Majeed, and premiered on 5 April 2025 at the Arts Council of Pakistan Karachi. The play features an ensemble cast including Yasir Hussain, Umer Aalam, Yusra Irfan, Bilal Yousufzai, Osama Bin Atiq, Khizr Ansari, Abdullah Wahab, and Hafsa Baksh. Following its initial run, Monkey Business toured multiple major cities across Pakistan, including Karachi, Islamabad, Lahore, and Faisalabad, with additional performances continuing throughout the year.

== Plot ==
Monkey Business follows Wasim, a small-scale con artist who maintains several parallel scams by adopting different identities to manipulate the circumstances around him. As his overlapping lies and disguises begin to collide, misunderstandings grow and the characters are drawn into escalating comedic confusion. The narrative culminates when Haroon's wife discovers his schemes, resulting in a humorous confrontation and the unravelling of his deceptions.

== Cast ==
Actor	Role	Notes
Yasir Hussain	Wasim	
Umer Aalam	Sherry	
Yusra Irfan	Sana	
Bilal Yousufzai	Sajid	Investigation Officer
Khizr Ansari	Gulfam	Super Fan
Osama Bin Atiq	Charlie	Community Worker
Abdullah Wahab	Sumair	Cousin
Hafsa Baksh	Annie	

== Production ==
The production of Monkey Business was led by producers Sajeel Meer Kazmi and Asiyah Majeed, who were responsible for the development, planning, and execution of the play.

== Reception ==
Dawn described the play as a refreshing entry into contemporary Pakistani stage comedy.

Mag The Weekly highlighted Yasir Hussain's direction and writing as "confident and self-assured", noting that the production pays homage to classic Karachi stage comedy while remaining contemporary.

Arab News emphasized the strong cast chemistry, particularly between Yasir Hussain and Umer Aalam, calling their performances "electric and charming."

Coverage from Biz Today and The Current praised the pacing and comedic timing, stating that the play kept audiences "laughing throughout."

Youlin Magazine described the play as a "riotous homage" to Umer Sharif, interpreting it as part tribute, part modern revival of Karachi comedic theatre.

The News International also reported strong audience turnout, noting lively crowd reactions and repeated applause during the performance.
