= Band Toh Baje Ga =

- Genre: Comedy; Family
- Written by: Ali Moeen
- Directed by: Misbah Khalid
- Starring: Hania Aamir; Yasir Hussain
- Country of origin: Pakistan
- Original language: Urdu

Production
- Producer: Moomal Productions

Original release
- Network: Hum TV
- Release: June 2018

Band Toh Baje Ga (Previously titled: Go To Hell) is a Pakistani television film released on Eid-ul-Fitr in 2018. Produced by Moomal Productions, the telefilm stars Hania Aamir and Yasir Hussain in lead roles.

== Cast ==
- Hania Aamir as Mariyam aka Momi.
- Yasir Hussain as Amir Hussain Malkani.
- Zainab Qayyum as Naila: Mariyam's mother.
- Noman Masood as Jahanzaib: Mariyam's father.
- Nazli Nasr as Amir's mother.
- Malik Raza as Allah Ditta: Amir's father.

== Production ==
The film was initially titled Go to Hell but the producers changed it to Band Toh Baje Ga. The film is directed by Misbah Khalid and produced by Moomal Productions, who previously produced successful drama serials Zindagi Gulzar Hai, Shehr-e-Zaat and Ishq Junoon Deewangi. In early May 2018, Amir posted her video of being part of the project. Talking about the project and his character, Yasir said, "It's a fun and light-hearted film and was easy for us to work in, my character will be a young man who's come from a rural background and accomplished a lot but still has a conservative family".
