= Project Ghazi =

2019 Pakistani Urdu language science fiction action film

- Theatrical release Poster
- Directed by: Nadir Shah
- Written by: Syed Mohammed Ali Raza
- Produced by: Syed Mohammed Ali Raza
- Starring: Humayun Saeed; Sheheryar Munawar; Syra Yousuf; Adnan Jaffar; Talat Hussain
- Production company: GYR Films
- Distributed by: Distribution Club
- Release date: 29 March 2019
- Running time: 100 minutes
- Country: Pakistan
- Language: Urdu
- Box office: Rs. 10 crore (US$360,000)

Project Ghazi (Urdu: غازی; meaning Hero and Conqueror) is a 2019 Pakistani science fiction action film. The film is directed by Nadir Shah and produced by Syed Mohammed Ali Raza who are known for their work on TV commercials as well as short films. The film stars Humayun Saeed, Shehryar Munawar and Syra Shehroz.

== Synopsis ==
The film revolves around a team of scientists and soldiers aiming to produce a new breed of advanced weaponized soldiers code named Project Ghazi, until a group of rogue men try to seize the project. United with a team of dedicated scientist Zara Iftikhar (Syra Shehroz) and distinguished soldiers Major Zain (Sheheryar Munawar) and Salaar Salahuddin (Humayun Saeed) along with other people, they try to stop the rogue men. Little do they know that a major disaster is headed their way.

== Cast ==
- Humayun Saeed as Salaar Salahuddin
- Sheheryar Munawar as Major Zain
- Syra Yousuf as Zara Iftikhar
- Adnan Jaffar as Qataan
- Talat Hussain as Dr. Ziyaad
- Aamir Qureshi as Major Dilawar
- Nusrat Hidayatullah
- Raza Hyder as Colonel Armaghan

== Production ==
=== Development ===
During a live Facebook session with The Express Tribune, director Nadir Shah explained that "It's a story of an advanced soldier project and it spans over a period of 20 years." He also revealed that there was an element of espionage genre in the film as well.

=== Casting ===
On 12 April 2016 Sheheryar posted a picture of the script on his Instagram account. In an interview with HIP Pakistan he revealed that he will play the lead in the film. "Though I'm not allowed to speak about the project or my character, but I play the protagonist in Project Ghazi. It's basically an action film, and is about to go on floors in a few days." Later Syra Shehroz, veteran actor Talat Hussain and Aamir Qureshi were also chosen to play complex characters, and Adnan Jaffar was cast to play the main antagonist in the film. Humayun Saeed was later cast to play the role of Colonel Salaar in a lead role.

=== Filming ===
Project Ghazi was filmed in Pakistan.

== Release ==
Project Ghazi was initially scheduled for release on 14 July 2017. But at the premiere event, a day before its general release, it was postponed due to technical issues, particularly the sound design. The film was released on 29 March 2019.

== Reception ==
=== Critical reception ===
Sonia Ashraf of DAWN Images praised the performances of Saeed and Munawar and wrote, "Project Ghazi on its own does have its flaws but knowing the journey the movie made, it feels glad to see the progression.

== See also ==
- List of highest-grossing Pakistani films
- List of Pakistani films of 2019
