= Akbar Subhani =

Pakistani actor

- Born: 30 December 1957 (age 68)
- Occupation: Actor
- Years active: 1970–present
- Parents: Dr. Major Naeemuddin Khan Subhani (father); Rahim Un Nisa Subhani (mother)

Akbar Subhani is a veteran Pakistani actor of film and television. Known for his supporting roles, he is best recognized in PTV's most acclaimed serials such as Sitara Aur Mehrunissa and Uncle Urfi and has worked in critically acclaimed films Josh: Independence Through Unity and Manto for which he received ARY Film Award for Best Actor in a Negative Role nomination at 2nd ARY Film Awards.

== Filmography ==
=== Films ===
- Josh: Independence Through Unity
- Manto
- Arifa
- Moor

=== Television ===
- Sitara Aur Mehrunissa
- Uncle Urfi
- Meharun Nisa
- Moorat
- Mahnoor
- Riyasat
- Sabz Qadam
- Dil-e-Nadaan
- Dhoop Main Sawan
- Shama
- Akhri Joint Family
- Uroos Paroos
- Hum Pe Jo Guzarti Hai
- Colony 52
- Rozi
- Bay Iman
- Muhabbat Kaun Rookay
- Kachra Kundi
- Perfume Chowk
- Aitbaar
- Chaap Tayar Hai
- Ishq Zahe Naseeb
- Malaal E Yaar (Cameo Role)
- Tarap

== Awards and nominations ==
- 2nd Lux Style Awards - Rabiya Zinda Rahay Gi (nom)
- 2nd ARY Film Awards - Manto (pending)
