= Sirf Tum Hi To Ho =

Tum Hi To Ho
- Film poster
- Directed by: Sangeeta
- Written by: Sooraj Baba
- Produced by: Sangeeta
- Starring: Danish Taimoor; Qurat ul Ain; Mathira; Saim Ali; Sangeeta
- Cinematography: Khalid
- Production company: Sangeeta Productions
- Release date: 19 July 2019
- Running time: 130 minutes
- Country: Pakistan
- Language: Urdu
- Box office: 5 Crore

Sirf Tum Hi To Ho is a 2019 Pakistani romantic drama film, directed by Sangeeta and written by Sooraj Baba. The film starred Danish Taimoor, Qurat ul Ain, and Mathira in leading roles. The film was released on 19 July 2019.

== Plot summary ==
Taimoor stars as the love interest of a vamp (Mathira), while instead, being in love with a librarian played by Qurat ul Ain.

== Cast ==
- Danish Taimoor as Noor
- Qurat ul Ain as Roshni
- Mathira as Shiza
- Saim Ali
- Sangeeta as herself (special appearance)
- Lucky Ali (cameo appearance)
- Ghana Ali (cameo appearance)
- Maryam (cameo appearance)

== Production ==
Principal photography on the film began on 29 September 2015 in Karachi, while it would also be shot in Lahore and Murree. Sangeeta served as director and producer, Pappu Samrat as choreographer and Khalid as its director of photography. Danish Taimoor and Qurut ul ain were playing the lead cast of the film, set in a college, while Maryam would appear in an "item number." Mathira was also cast in the film, who would be playing the villainous role opposite Qurutulain in the love triangle. Sana was also cast in for the item number Koi Mayi Ka Laal Hai Tou Saamne Aye, but was replaced by Lucky Ali, Ghana Ali, and Maryam who was also previously announced.

== Music ==
Music of the film was done by several singers. An 'item number' Koi Mayi Ka Laal Hai Tou Saamne Aye will also feature in the film.

== Release ==
Initially, Sirf Tum Hi To Ho was set to release in July 2016, two days before Eid. Later, Sangeeta confirmed to Entertainment Website HIP Pakistan that the film will be released in December 2016 and it will be distributed in Pakistan by Geo Films. In a 2017 interview, Sangeeta on being asked about the film's delay, revealed she is facing trouble with the film's distributor, and said My distributor backed out at the last moment and asked me to finance the distribution myself. I refused.

The film was released on 19 July 2019.

== Reception ==
=== Critical reception ===
Mohammad Kamran Jawaid of Dawn remarked that, ''Director Sangeeta's Sirf Tum He Toh Ho may have been a sufferable idea 15 years ago, but even then the script would have needed a re-write, and a better cinematographer, editor and director. Hassan Hassan of Galaxy Lollywood gave the verdict as, Watch Sirf Tum Hi Tou Ho if you are an ardent Danish Taimoor or Mathira fan or more rarely, if you love the cinema of yesteryear in any of its forms.
