= Mathira =

Pakistani actress and model

- متھیرا
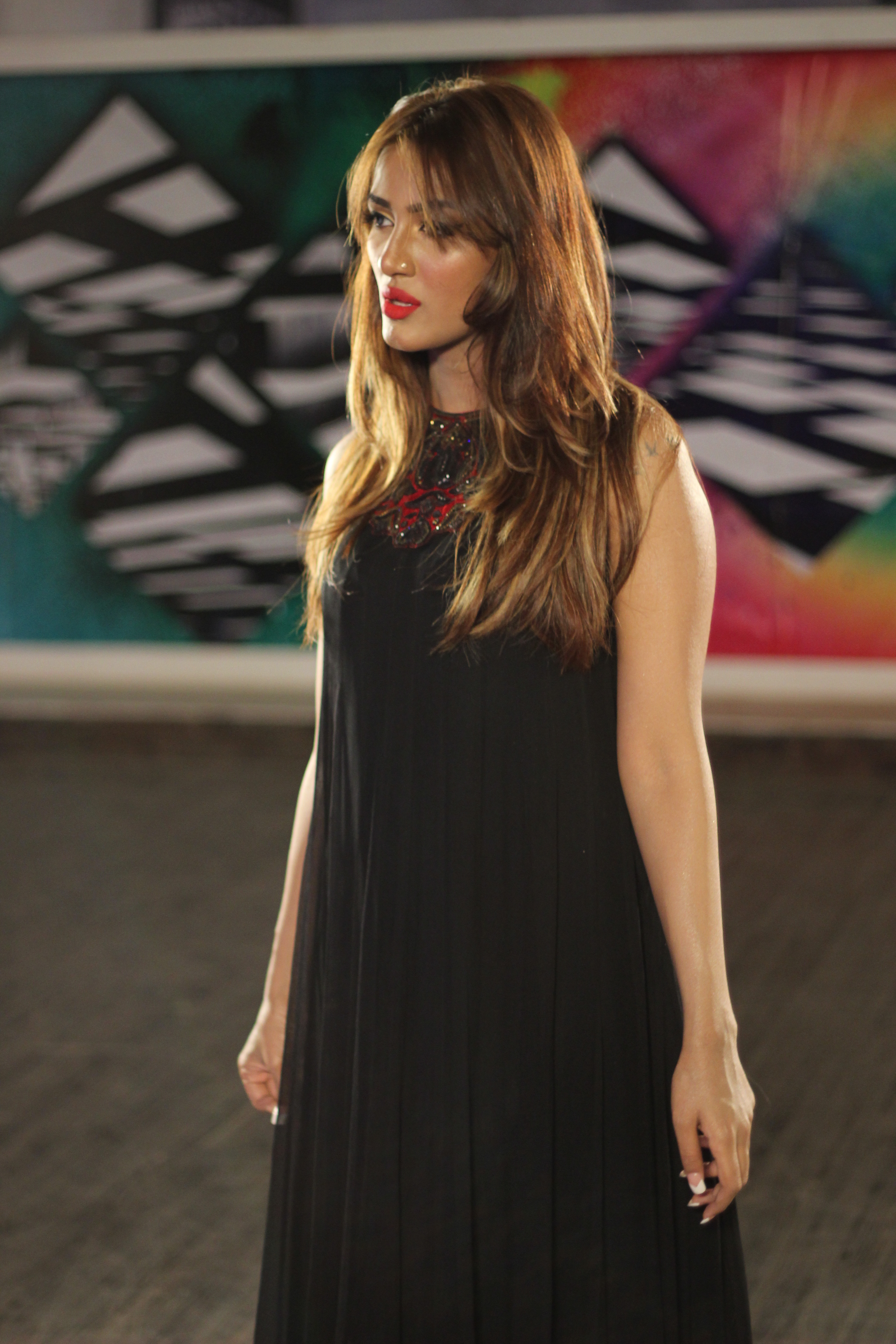
- During the video shoot of "Piya Re" by Furqan and Imran
- Born: Mathira; 25 February 1992 (age 34); Harare, Zimbabwe
- Citizenship: Pakistani
- Occupations: actress; television hostess; singer
- Years active: 2007–present
- Spouse: Farran J. Mirza (Flint J) (m. 2014; div. 2018)
- Relatives: Rose Mohammad (sister)

Mathira Mohammad, mononymously known as Mathira, is a Pakistani-Zimbabwean model, dancer, television hostess, singer, and actor. She has hosted several television shows and appeared in music videos. She is known for her item songs in Main Hoon Shahid Afridi and the Indian Punjabi film Young Malang.

== Early life and career ==
Mathira was born into a Muslim family in Harare, Zimbabwe to a South African father and a Pakistani mother. Her sister Rose Muhammad is also an actress. She was educated in Zimbabwe before moving to Pakistan with her family amid unrest in Zimbabwe. She made her debut in music videos of Jadugar, Desi Beat and "Nachdi Kamal" by Malkoo and Woh Kaun Thi by Rizwan-ul-Haq, and "Jotha Tu Hai" by Arbaz Khan. In March 2011, she got a chance to host a late-night programme Love Indicator on Vibe TV.

Mathira then shot for the cover of a leading Pakistani fashion magazine. In 2011, she also hosted an AAG TV's show Baji Online. In 2013, she made her debut in Bollywood by doing an item song "Lakk Ch Current" in Indian Punjabi film Young Malang. She has also done an item number "Masti Mein Doobi Raat Hai" in the film Main Hoon Shahid Afridi starring Humayun Saeed. She then appeared in the music video of the song "Jhootha" with young rapper Arbaz Khan, which was released on 30 December 2013.

In 2014, she acted in a film directed by Vipin Sharma. In 2015, she featured in the song "Piya Re" with Furqan and Imran by paying tribute to Adnan Sami Khan's song "Bheegi Bheegi Raaton Mein".

From 2017 to 2019, she played a supporting character in Geo Kahani's series Naagin. In 2019, she was seen in the romance-thriller film Sirf Tum Hi To Ho opposite Danish Taimoor.

== Personal life ==
Mathira married Punjabi singer Farran J. Mirza (also known as Flint J) in 2012. The couple has a son, Aahil Rizvi who was born in September 2014. Mathira shared the news of their divorce in an Instagram post in January 2018.

== Filmography ==
=== Films ===
Year	Title	Role	Notes	Ref.
2013	Young Malang	Dancer in the Song "Lakk Ch Current"	Bollywood Movie	
2013	Main Hoon Shahid Afridi	Dancer	Special appearance	
2016	Blind Love		Special appearance	
2017	Raasta	Dancer in the Song "Pee Lay"	Special appearance	
2019	Sirf Tum Hi To Ho	Shiza		
2019	Tevar			
TBA	Sikander			

=== Television ===
Year	Title	Role	Notes	Ref.
2011	Love Indicator	Host		
2017–2019	Naagin	Mastaani		
2017	Biwi Se Biwi Tak	Guest appearance		
2020	Game Show Aisay Chalay Ga League	Team captain (Quetta Wolves)	Runner-up	
2020	Khush Raho Pakistan 2020 Cup (Season 2)	Team captain (Team Gilgit Baltistan)	Runner-up	
2020	The Insta Show with Mathira	Host		
2020	Desi Rapper	Host		

=== Music videos ===
Year	TItle	Artist(s)	Ref.
2012	"Desi Beat"	Malkoo, AK The Punjabi Rapper	
2013	"Jhootha"	Arbaz Khan	
2013	"Nachidi Kamal"	Malkoo	

== Discography ==
Featured in

- "Piya Re" – Furqan and Imran feat. Mathira

== See also ==
- List of Pakistani actresses
- Meera
- Veena Malik
