= Huang Yong (murderer) =

Chinese serial killer

- 黄勇
- Born: November 18, 1974; Zhumadian, Henan, China
- Died: December 26, 2003 (aged 29); Zhumadian, Henan, China
- Cause of death: Execution by shooting
- Penalty: Death

Details
- Victims: 17–25+
- Span of crimes: September 2001 – November 2003
- Country: China
- State: Henan
- Date apprehended: November 12, 2003

Huang Yong (Chinese: 黄勇; pinyin: Huáng Yǒng; November 18, 1974 – December 26, 2003) was a Chinese serial killer convicted of murdering 17 teenage boys and young men (although he is suspected of at least 25 murders) between September 2001 and November 2003. He was executed in December 2003.

== Early life ==
Huang was a migrant worker from Zhumadian, Henan, who was employed in southern China. After serving a tour of duty in the Chinese Army, Huang became a migrant worker, doing agricultural jobs throughout southern China.

== Murders and modus operandi ==
In September 2001, Huang started to lure teenage boys and young men from video halls, Internet cafes and video arcades to his house by offering to recommend them for well-paying jobs or to fund their schooling or sightseeing tours. In his house, Huang drugged the youths or would trick them onto a device he named the "Intelligent Wooden Horse" sometimes as part of a game he called "God riding on a Wooden Horse" before restraining them and strangling them with a rope, often reviving them multiple times to torture them before ultimately killing them. Other sources say he would engage in acts of coercive sexual violence and humiliation often with foreign objects as another form of torture once his victims were restrained; sometimes lasting for several hours, hence why it is referred to as rape.

Huang told investigators that he chose to victimize boys and young men because killing women and girls would make him see himself as less of a "hero," and he did not kill elderly men because they were too vigilant.

== Final victim, capture, and execution ==
In November 2003, a 16-year-old boy named Zhang Liang went to the police. Investigators at first were not convinced of Liang's story but the boy claimed that Huang had invited him to his apartment by offering him a job. Once he got there, Zhang said that Huang strangled him to unconsciousness three times. Afterwards, when the young boy awoke, Huang said to him, "I killed at least 25 people. You're number 26", but Liang talked Huang out of killing him, after which Huang gave Liang enough money to get home. Instead, Liang reported his torture and attempted murder to the police.

While initially skeptical of Liang's claims, the police believed Liang's story and arrested Huang, who was convicted of 17 murders and sentenced to death on December 9, 2003. He was executed by a bullet to the head on December 26, 2003. After his execution, authorities found two more bodies in Huang's home.

Huang described the motive for his crimes by saying, "I've always wanted to be an assassin since I was a kid, but I never had the chance."

== See also ==
- List of serial killers in China
- List of serial killers by number of victims
- Javed Iqbal (serial killer)
- Dennis Nilsen
