= Taxali Gate =

Former gate of the Walled City of Lahore, Pakistan

- ٹکسالی دروازه
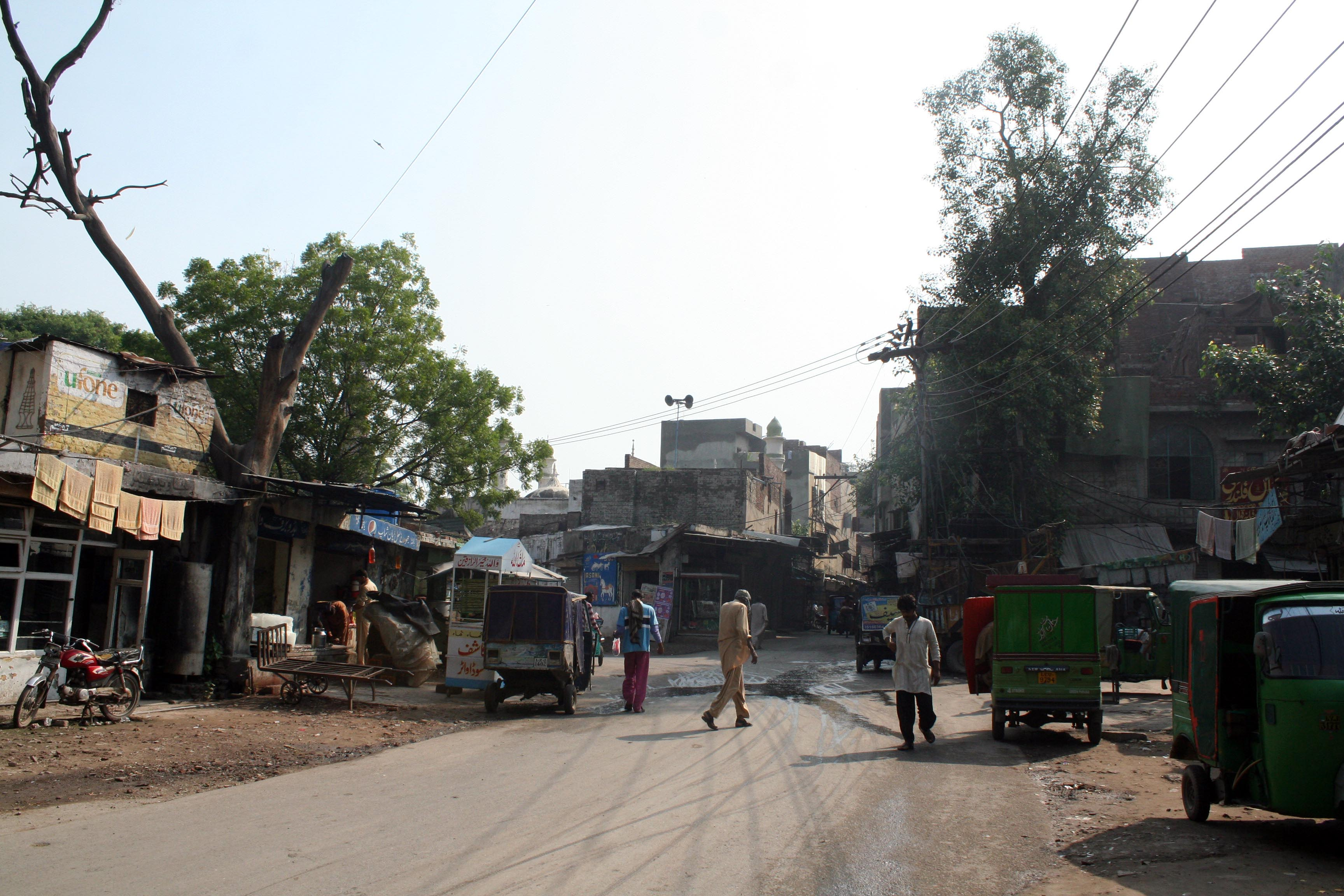
- The gate no longer exists
- Interactive map of Taxali Gate
- Location: Lahore, Punjab, Pakistan
- Coordinates: 31.58595°N 74.30779°E
- Type: City gate

Taxali Gate (Urdu: ٹکسالی دروازه, Taxali Darwaza) is one of the 13 historic gates of the Walled City of Lahore, Pakistan.

== History ==
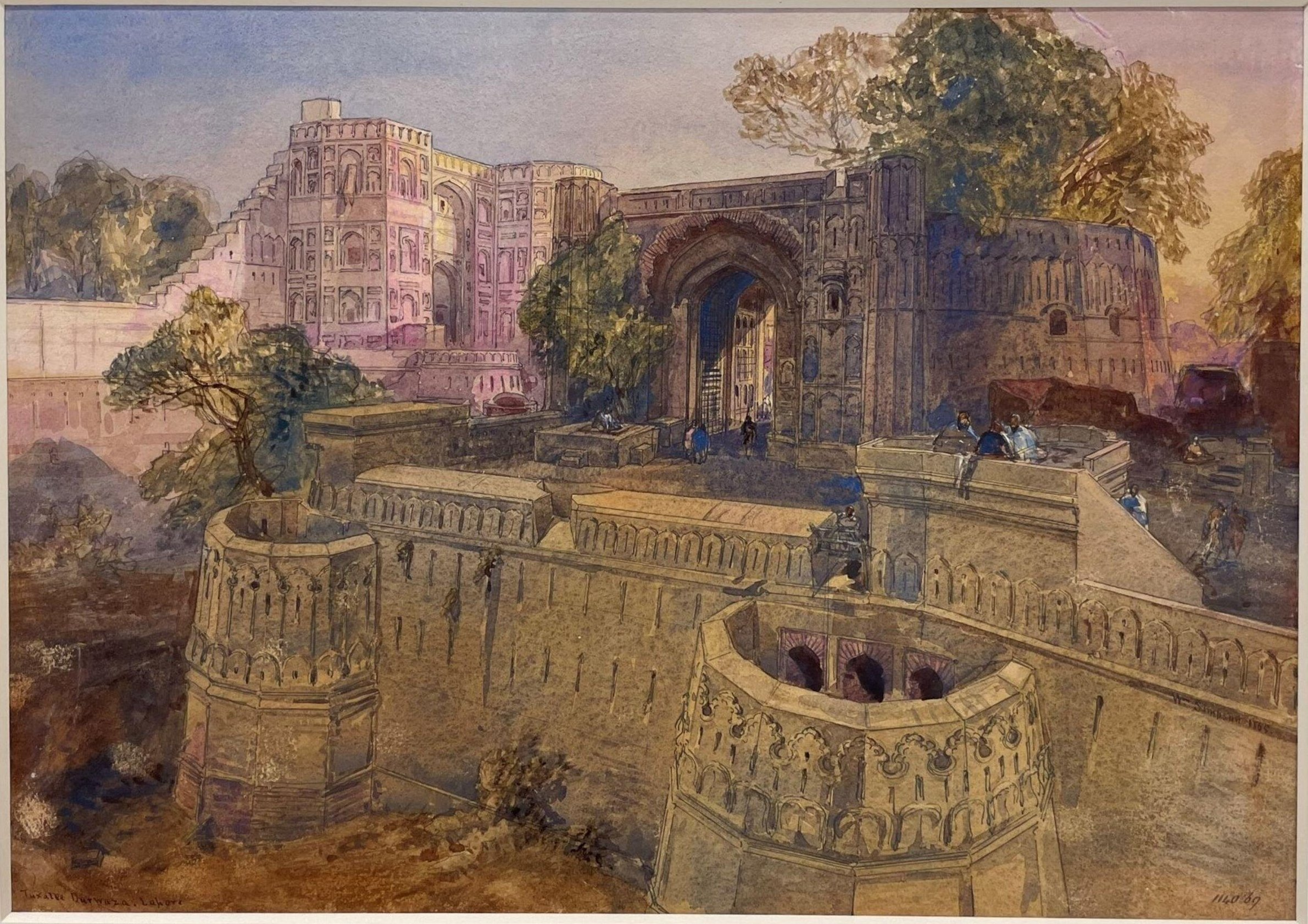
Watercolour painting titled 'Taxali Darwaza, Lahore', painted in 1865 by William Simpson

Also known as the 'Taxal', or royal mint, it was built from 1575 -1585 during the reign of the Mughal emperor Akbar. A wholesale shoe market located here, known as Sheikhupurian Bazaar, offers a wide range of footware including khussa and Peshawari Chappal. Taxali Gate area was also known for the promotion of art, music and literature, and eateries serving a variety of traditional cuisine, including Sri Pai of Fazal Din commonly known as 'Phajja' and 'Andaaz Restaurant' on Fort Road Food Street. A large musical instrument market called Lahnga Mandi is also located here.

There are many food points in Chowk Heera Mandi. Among specialist sweets stores are Taj Mahal Halwa Puri, Shahabuddin Halwai and Bhola Lassi Wala. Heera Mandi also called 'Shahi Mohalla', a defunct red light district, used to lie close to this gate, where Mughal Emperors used to house their royal consorts. Taxali Gate also serves as Union Council 30 (UC 30) in Tehsil Ravi Town of Lahore City District of Punjab, Pakistan. There is a sense of religious harmony that once was in this area. A gurdawara, mosque and a church are there in the same vicinity.

"Taxali Gate was not always famous for its brothel houses or the dancing girls. It was once the nucleus of literature, art, music and many noble and prominent personalities lived there".

Famous Fort Road Food Street is also located inside the Taxali Gate area.

== Notable people from the area ==
- Ustad Daman, Pakistani Punjabi-language poet (1911-1984)
- Shah Hussain, Punjabi Sufi poet (1538-1599)
- Maulana Altaf Hussain Hali, Famous Urdu-language poet (1837-1914)
- Allama Iqbal (1877-1938)
- Yousuf Salahuddin, A renowned socialite and a grandson of Allama Iqbal who resides in the historical building 'Haveli Barood Khana'
- Noor Jehan, Famous film actress and playback singer (1926-2000)
- Sir Ganga Ram, Builder of modern Lahore (1851-1927)

== See also ==
- Lahore Fort
- Walled City of Lahore
- Badshahi Mosque
- Bhati Gate
