= Daadal =

- Poster
- Directed by: Abu Aleeha
- Written by: Abu Aleeha
- Produced by: Neha Laaj; Asif Malik
- Starring: Shamoon Abbasi; Mohsin Abbas Haider; Sonya Hussyn; Rizwan Ali Jaffri; Maira Khan
- Cinematography: Asrad Khan
- Edited by: Diginext
- Music by: Ali Allahditta
- Production companies: Laaj Productions; B13 Productions
- Distributed by: Eveready Pictures
- Release date: 21 April 2023
- Country: Pakistan
- Language: Urdu

Daadal is a 2023 Pakistani crime thriller film written and directed by Abu Aleeha and produced by Neha Laaj and Asif Malik. It stars Shamoon Abbasi, Mohsin Abbas Haider, Sonya Hussyn, Rizwan Ali Jaffri, Maira Khan. The film follows a female boxer from Lyari who becomes a contract killer targeting abusive men.

== Cast ==
- Shamoon Abbasi
- Mohsin Abbas Haider
- Sonya Hussyn
- Rizwan Jaffari
- Maira Khan
- Adnan Shah Tipu

== Reception ==
Mohammad Kamran Jawaid of Dawn Images, praised Sonya Hussyn's intense performance and Mohsin Abbas Haider's dominant presence, along with the film's decent cinematography. However, he felt the narrative struggled after a strong pre-intermission sequence, ultimately leading to a weak climax that underutilized the supporting cast.

Hurmat Majid of Youlin Magazine, praised Daadal as a bold exploration of abuse and revenge, highlighting Sonya Hussyn's strong lead performance and the film's gritty cinematography. However, Majid noted that the story felt rushed and underdeveloped in the second half.
