= Sheheryar Munawar =

Pakistani actor

- شہریار منور صدیقی
- Born: Sheheryar Munawar Siddiqui; 9 August 1988 (age 38); Karachi, Sindh, Pakistan
- Occupations: Actor, filmmaker
- Years active: 2012–present
- Spouse: Maheen Siddiqui (m. 2024)
- Relatives: Siddiqui family

Sheheryar Munawar (Note: شہریار منور) (born Shereyar Munawar Siddiqui; 9 August 1988) is a Pakistani film and television actor, director and producer. He is the recipient of a Lux Style Award and a Hum Award.

The nephew of Hum Network founder Sultana Siddiqui, Munawar pursued finance and marketing from the Institute of Business Administration. Aspiring to take up a career in acting, he worked as a model for various brands and made his acting debut with the acclaimed television series Meray Dard Ko Jo Zuban Miley (2012), winning the Hum Award for Best Television Sensation.

Munawar then went on to play the romantic interest of female leads in the romance Kahi Un Kahi (2013), and received praise for portraying a struggling husband in the Geo TV series Aasmanon Pay Likha (2014). He followed it by starring and co-producing the coming-of-age musical film Ho Mann Jahaan (2016) and the romantic comedy film Parey Hut Love (2019). For the former, he won the Lux Style Award for Best Supporting Actor, and the latter earned him two Best Actor nominations at Lux Style, and both the films rank among the highest-grossing Pakistani films.

== Early life and background ==
Sheheryar Munawar was born in Karachi, Sindh, Pakistan on 9 August 1988. His father, air commodore Munawar Alam Siddiqui, was in the Pakistan Air Force before turning to business after retirement, and his mother is a housewife. His father, Munawar, is also a board member of Hum Network, founded by his aunt Sultana Siddiqui. His sister, Nadia, is a business graduate, while his elder brother, Asfandyar, who died in a car accident on 23 December 2012, was an investment banker. His younger brother, Manoucheher, was wounded in a café shooting in 2011.

In a 2018 interview with Samina Peerzada, he revealed that he's of Sindhi descent from his paternal side and Brahui maternally. One of his uncles, Mazhar ul Haq Siddiqui, is one of Pakistan's senior most civil servants and an eminent educationist, who also served as the vice-chancellor of Sindh University and is a board member of Hum Network as well, while another of his uncle, Jahangir Siddiqui, is the founder of JS Group. Ali Jehangir Siddiqui, an entrepreneur who also served as ambassador of Pakistan to the United States for few months in 2018, and the businessmen Shunaid Qureshi and Duraid Qureshi, are his cousins.

Munawar relocated to Islamabad along with his family for a brief period of time, when he was young. He was educated at The City School with O Levels there. The family moved back to Karachi a few years later, and he finished his A levels from the Southshore School in Karachi. Munawar later graduated with a bachelor's degree in finance and marketing with a minor in advertising from the Institute of Business Administration (IBA).

== Career ==
While studying at IBA, Munawar had acted in television commercials during his advertising classes. After graduating from IBA, he worked for some time at Engro Foods and later at a German venture capitalist company in Karachi, Rocket Internet, which had launched the e-commerce portal Daraz, during this time he participated and won an advertisement-making competition for KFC, and then appeared in an advertisement for Omoré.

Munawar later quit his job to pursue acting and appeared in several advertisements for various brands and products. He soon received offers for acting roles and made his acting debut in 2012 with the Hum TV's drama series Meray Dard Ko Jo Zuban Miley, in which he played the character of a deaf and dumb boy. He later played leading and supporting roles in several television series, including the ensemble social drama Tanhaiyan Naye Silsilay (2012), a spiritual sequel to the 1986 series Tanhaiyaan, the romantic series Kahi Unkahi (2012), opposite Ayeza Khan and Urwa Hocane, and played the friend of the lead character (played by Fawad Khan), on his aunt Sultana Siddiqui's insistence, in one of the highest-rated television dramas of the country, the romance Zindagi Gulzar Hai (2013). Munawar then gained nationwide success with the Geo TV's critically acclaimed melodrama series Aasmanon Pay Likha (2013), opposite Sajal Aly.

Three years later, Munawar starred and produced the coming-of-age musical drama Ho Mann Jahaan (2016), a film about three college friends who are passionate about music and face difficulties for their common dream. Co-starring opposite Adeel Hussain and Mahira Khan, he was cast as a struggling musician who falls in love with his best friend. Upon release, the film received mixed reviews from critics, however Munawar was praised for his performance in the film. Commercially, the film went on to become one of the highest-grossing films of 2016. At the annual Lux Style Awards, Munawar was awarded the Lux Style Award Best Supporting Actor for his performance and received an additional nomination in the Best Film category. Following the success of Ho Mann Jahaan, he starred in the romantic comedy 7 Din Mohabbat In (2018). Directed by Meenu–Farjad, his role was of an introverted man who is romantically involved with three women, played by Mahira Khan, Mira Sethi and Amna Ilyas, at different stages of his life. Amna Zaidi of Siddy Says praised Munawar, stating that "Tipu played by Sheheryar is the highlight of the film, not only does he act like a dorkey 29 year old to perfection, he looks amazing on screen". The film, despite receiving mixed to negative reviews, was a commercial success, with a worldwide earning of Rs. 13 million (US$47,000).

In 2019, Munawar featured alongside Humayun Saeed and Syra Yousuf in the science fiction Project Ghazi, a film about a group of rogue men try to seize a project. The film was a commercial disappointment. Munawar next played the role of one of a self-confessed aspiring actor in Asim Raza's romantic comedy Parey Hut Love (2019). The film, divided in four chapters, tells the story of a commitment phobic guy who falls in love with an already engaged girl (played by Maya Ali). The film received positive reviews from critics, and Munawar earned critical acclaim for his performance. The Express Tribune wrote that "[Sheheryar] has come a long way and that's evident in this movie — he is not the best but definitely not the worst". Dawn noted that "He takes the emotional highs and lows of his character in stride to look within and struggle with introspection and repeated career and personal setbacks." Mahwash Ajaz thought that the film is a "stunning cinematic experience" and added that Munawar is "definitely the new heartthrob of the nation. He's the it boy you've been waiting for. His eyes and vulnerability express a lot and you can't help but root for him and his struggle." Parey Hut Love earned over Rs. 300 million (US$1.1 million) to emerge as one of the highest-grossing Pakistani films. Pehli Si Mohabbat, which he stars opposite Maya Ali started airing on Hum TV in 2021. In 2026, he starred in Dar-e-Nijaat, released on ARY Digital through his production house Three’s Entertainment, which he owns alongside Salman Iqbal, the head of ARY Digital Network, and Salman's wife Sonya Khan.

== Personal life ==
Munawar announced his engagement to Hala Soomro, a doctor, on his social media account in March 2019. However, the engagement was called off in October the same year and no reason was given.

On 27 December 2024, Munawar married actress Maheen Siddiqui in a traditional Sindhi wedding in Karachi after a courtship of 1 year.

== Filmography ==
=== Films ===
Year	Title	Role	Producer	Ref.
2015	Ho Mann Jahaan	Arhan	Yes	
2018	7 Din Mohabbat In	Tipu		
2019	Project Ghazi	Zayn		
2019	Parey Hut Love	Shahryar	Yes	
2021	Khel Khel Mein	Wajih Karamullah (Dada)		
2023	Teri Meri Kahaniyaan	Salman		

=== Television series ===
Year	Title	Role	Producer	Network	Notes	Ref.
2012	Meray Dard Ko Jo Zuban Miley	Arooj		Hum TV	Supporting role	
2013	Tanhaiyan Naye Silsilay	Zarak Khan		ARY Digital	Supporting role	
2013	Kahi Unkahi	Shahryar		Hum TV	Leading role	
2013	Zindagi Gulzar Hai	Osama		Hum TV	Supporting role	
2014	Aasmanon Pay Likha	Aaliyan		Geo Entertainment	Leading role	
2021	Pehli Si Muhabbat	Aslam		ARY Digital	Leading role	
2021	Sinf-e-Aahan	Major Usama		ARY Digital	Supporting role	
2023	Aik Thi Laila	Qais		Express Entertainment	Cameo	
2023	Kuch Ankahi	Asfar Motiwala		ARY Digital	Leading role	
2024	Radd	Salaar Shah		ARY Digital	Leading role	
2024	Aye Ishq e Junoon	Rahim Ali Nawaz		ARY Digital	Leading role	
2026	Dar-e-Nijaat	Abu Bakar Aman	Yes	ARY Digital	Leading role	
2026	Lagan Lagi	No	Yes	ARY Digital	Producer	

=== Telefilms ===
Year	Title	Role	Director	Screenwriter	Network	Ref.
2023	Budhi Ghori Laal Lagam	No	Yes	Yes	Geo Entertainment	

=== Web ===
Year	Title	Role	Director	Screenwriter	Platform	Notes	Ref.
2021	Prince Charming	No	Yes	Yes	See Prime on YouTube	Short film; Directorial debut	
2021	Qatil Haseenaon Ke Naam	Bilal			ZEE5	Web series	
2023	Likhari	Kabir Khan			See Prime on YouTube	Short film	

== Awards and nominations ==
Year	Award	Category	Program	Result	Ref(s).
2013	1st Hum Awards	Best New Sensation Male	Meray Dard Ko Jo Zuban Miley	Won	
2016	1st Hum Style Awards	Most Stylish Film Actor	Ho Mann Jahaan	Nominated	
2017	16th Lux Style Awards	Best Supporting Actor	Ho Mann Jahaan	Won	
2017	Galaxy Lollywood Awards	Best Male Debut	Ho Mann Jahaan	Won	
2017	Galaxy Lollywood Awards	Best Actor in a Supporting Role	Ho Mann Jahaan	Won	
2017	International Pakistan Prestige Awards	Best Actor Film	Ho Mann Jahaan	Nominated	
2017	Nigar Awards	Best Debut Male	Ho Mann Jahaan	Nominated	
2020	Pakistan International Screen Awards	Best Actor in a Leading Role	Parey Hut Love	Won	
2020	19th Lux Style Awards	Best Actor Viewer's Choice	Parey Hut Love	Nominated	
2020	19th Lux Style Awards	Best Actor Critic's Choice	Parey Hut Love	Nominated	
2021	Filmfare Middle East Awards	Best Debutante Filmmaker	Parey Hut Love	Won	
2021	International Pakistan Prestige Awards	Best On-Screen Film Couple (with Maya Ali)	Parey Hut Love	Won	
2025	2nd Kya Drama Hai Icon Awards	Best Actor (Critics’ Choice)	Radd	Nominated	
2026	3rd Pakistan International Screen Awards	Best Actor - TV (Popular)	Radd	Nominated	
