= Javed Iqbal (serial killer) =

Pakistani serial killer (1961–2001)

- Iqbal in custody, March 2000
- Born: Javed Iqbal Mughal; 1961 (Note: BBC News lists Iqbal as 38 years old on 31 December 1999, establishing his approximate date of birth as 1961.); Lahore, Punjab, Pakistan
- Died: 8 October 2001 (aged 39–40); Lahore, Punjab, Pakistan
- Cause of death: Suicide by hanging
- Other name: Kukri
- Convictions: Child sex abuse Murder (100 counts)
- Penalty: Death

Details
- Victims: 100
- Span of crimes: 20 June 1999 – 13 November 1999
- Country: Pakistan
- Date apprehended: 30 December 1999

Javed Iqbal Mughal (1961 – 8 October 2001) was a Pakistani serial killer and child molester who confessed to the sexual abuse and murder of 100 young boys, ranging in age from 6 to 16. His victims were strangled, dismembered, and then dissolved in acid to destroy any evidence.

== Early life ==
Iqbal was the sixth of eight children of his businessman father. He grew up in Lahore, Pakistan. In 1978, while still a student, he started a steel recasting business. Iqbal lived, along with boys, in a villa that his father had purchased for him in the Alter area of the city.

== Murders ==
In December 1999, Iqbal sent a letter to the police and to the chief news editor of a Lahore newspaper, Khawar Naeem Hashmi, in which he confessed to the rape and murder of 100 vulnerable boys, all aged between 6 and 16. He wrote that he had strangled and dismembered the victims, who were mostly runaways or orphans living on the streets of Lahore, after sexually assaulting them, and had then disposed of their bodies using vats of hydrochloric acid that he later emptied into a local river.

Inside Iqbal's house, police and reporters found bloodstains on the walls and floor, a chain with which Iqbal claimed to have strangled the boys, and photographs of many of his victims in plastic bags. These items were neatly labelled, with names and ages on handwritten pamphlets. Two vats of acid with partially dissolved human remains were also left for the police to find, a note claiming that the bodies in the house had deliberately not been disposed of so that authorities would find them.

In his letter, Iqbal stated that, with his crimes completed, he now planned to drown himself in the Ravi River; however, after unsuccessfully dragging said river with nets, police launched the largest manhunt in Pakistani history. Four accomplices, teenage boys who had shared Iqbal's three-bedroom flat, were arrested in Sohawa. Within days, one of them died in police custody, a post-mortem suggesting that force had been used against him; the police said he had jumped of his own accord from a window.

"My count has reached 100. He was a handsome 16-year-old Pathan boy ... he came from Peshawar. With the grace of God, my mission is complete. Tears roll down my cheeks. I will make sure that my mission, and my message reaches the world."

— One of the final entries within Iqbal's journal in which he documented his murders.

=== Motive ===
Iqbal claimed that the motive for committing the murders was his anger over a perceived injustice at the hands of Lahore police: they had arrested him on charges relating to an act of sodomy against a young runaway boy in the 1990s. The victim of this sexual assault had severely bludgeoned Iqbal—predominantly about the head—rendering him unconscious. Though no charges were brought in relation to this offence, Iqbal's mother had "been forced to watch [his] decline" before suffering a fatal heart attack. According to Iqbal's confession, his mother's death after watching his social, economic and symbolic status deteriorate following his attack and arrest had "broken a hell" over him; he therefore resolved to make 100 mothers "suffer and cry" for their sons as his late mother had been forced to for him.

== Trial and sentencing ==
It was a month before Iqbal turned himself in at the offices of the Daily Jang on 30 December 1999. He was subsequently arrested. He stated that he had surrendered to the newspaper because he feared for his life and was concerned that the police would kill him.

Iqbal was sentenced to death; the judge passed the sentence saying, "You will be strangled to death in front of the parents whose children you killed[;] your body will then be cut into 100 pieces and put in acid, the same way you killed the children." Interior Minister Moinuddin Haider contradicted the sentence by stating that Pakistan is a signatory of the Human Rights Commission, so "such punishments are not allowed".

== Death ==
On 9 October 2001, Iqbal and an accomplice, Sajid Ahmed, were found dead in their respective cells at the Kot Lakhpat Jail in Lahore. The pair were officially ruled to have hanged themselves with their own bedsheets. Autopsies revealed that they had been beaten prior to death. Iqbal's body went unclaimed.

== In popular culture ==
A film based on the notorious serial killer titled, Javed Iqbal: The Untold Story of A Serial Killer (2023) follows the trial of Javid Iqbal. Scheduled for release on 28 January 2022, the film faced a ban from the Punjab government and the Central Board of Film Censors. It was removed from cinemas a day prior to its release due to its portrayal of the government and police.

After public backlash to the banning and the support of several actors for the film, it was finally released on 2 June 2023.

== See also ==
- List of serial killers by country
- List of serial killers by number of victims
- Luis Garavito
- Dennis Nilsen
- Huang Yong (murderer)
