= Kataksha =

- کتاکشا
- Directed by: Abu Aleeha
- Written by: Abu Aleeha
- Starring: Saleem Meraj; Kiran Tabeir; Kasim Khan; Nimra Shahid; Mubeen Gabol
- Cinematography: Junaid Mehmood
- Edited by: Muhammad Muneeb
- Music by: Bilal Allah Ditta; Ali Allah Ditta
- Production companies: Flashfilm Productions; G Films
- Release date: 21 June 2019
- Running time: 95 minutes
- Country: Pakistan
- Language: Urdu

Kataksha is a 2019 Pakistani psychological horror film. Directed and written by Abu Aleeha (in his directorial debut), the film stars Saleem Meraj, Kiran Tabeir, Kasim Khan, Nimra Shahid and Mubeen Gabol as a group of news crew on a mission to investigate haunted locations. During their journey, they explore the Katas Raj Temple near the town of Kallar Kahar, encountering the peculiar groundskeeper in charge.

== Synopsis ==
Four colleagues encounter problems while on a road trip to make a television documentary.

== Cast ==
- Saleem Mairaj
- Kiran Tabeir
- Kasim Khan
- Nimra Shahid
- Mubeen Gabol

== Production ==
This film has been directed by Abu Aleeha.

=== Production team ===
- Director & Producer: Abu Aleeha
- Editor: Muhammad Muneeb
- Color Grading: Sheikh Moin Ud Din
- Cinematographer: Junaid Mehmood
- Background Music: Bilal Allah Ditta / Ali Allah Ditta.

== Release ==
The film was released on 21 June 2019.

=== Box office ===
The film recorded the good opening in Pakistan despite limited shows. This film collected Rs.10.7 million in the first weekend. In first 10 days film earned 19.3 million rupees.

=== Screenings ===
- Kataksha will be shown at the London FrightFest Film Festival in August 2019.

== Reception ==
A very negative review in Dawn concluded, "Kataksha self-professes to be Pakistan’s first psychological horror. The psychological aspect is nowhere to be found here. It is, quite evidently, lost, like the horror and the storytelling." while another review found it was a "story-less trip to the Katas Raj Temples that pretends to be a horror flick".

A review on PakistaniCinema.net, however, was more positive.

== See also ==
- Cinema of Pakistan
- Lollywood
- List of highest-grossing Pakistani films
- List of Pakistani films of 2019
