= Kukri (film) =

2023 Pakistani Crime film

- Theatrical release poster
- Directed by: Abu Aleeha
- Written by: Abu Aleeha
- Produced by: Javed Ahmed
- Starring: Yasir Hussain; Ayesha Omar
- Production company: KK films
- Distributed by: Metro Live Movies
- Release date: 2 June 2023
- Country: Pakistan

Kukri, originally titled Javed Iqbal: The Untold Story of A Serial Killer, is a 2023 Pakistani biographical crime film based on the life of Javed Iqbal, a convicted serial killer and sex offender. The film was written and directed by Abu Aleeha and produced by Javed Ahmed under K K films banner. It depicts the events surrounding Iqbal's arrest and trial for the sexual abuse and murder of 100 boys. Yasir Hussain stars in the title role, with Ayesha Omar portraying Zara, a fictional police officer. The title Kukri refers to a nickname associated with Javed Iqbal.

The film's trailer was released on 8 December 2021, and its initial theatrical release was scheduled for 24 December 2021. This was later postponed to January 2022, with a new release date set for 28 January 2022, following a planned premiere in Karachi.

Prior to its release, the film was banned by the Punjab Government and the Central Board of Film Censors. Despite the ban, it was selected for screening at the Berlin International Film Festival. After the ban was lifted, the filmmakers revised the film and shortened its title to Kukri. It was officially released in cinemas on 2 June 2023. The uncensored cut of Javed Iqbal was released on 27 May 2026 coinciding with Eid ul Adha on the SeePrime YouTube channel.

== Synopsis ==
In December 1999, letters containing chilling confessions were sent to the Lahore police and a local newspaper by the now-infamous serial killer and pederast Javed Iqbal, graphically detailing how he murdered and dismembered 100 runaway boys and dissolved their remains in vats of hydrochloric acid. The film presents a fictional dramatisation of the subsequent police investigation, which raised far more questions than it answered, centring on a female police officer named Zara (Ayesha Omar) who leads the inquiry into one of Pakistan's most disturbing criminal cases. Iqbal was ultimately found guilty and sentenced to death in the same manner in which he killed his victims.

== Cast ==
- Yasir Hussain as Javed Iqbal
- Ayesha Omar as Zara
- Kaleem Ghori
- Rabya Kulsoom
- Paras Masroor
- Khalid Bin Shaheen
- Aamir Yamin

== Ban ==
The film was pulled out of theatres a day before its release, owing to the ban by the Punjab government and the Central Board of Film Censors. Pakistani celebrities such as Iqra Aziz, Ali Rehman Khan and Osman Khalid Butt came out in the support of the makers and protested against the ban.

== Sequel ==
In October 2022, the makers announced the sequel titled "Javed Iqbal 2" will be released on an OTT platform, targeting an international audience, with Yasir Hussain reprising his role as Javed Iqbal, and will explore a more detailed and brutal story about the serial killer's life.
