= Abu Aleeha =

Pakistani director and actor

- Occupations: film director; writer
- Years active: 2019–present

Abu Aleeha (born Ali Sajjad Shah) is a Pakistani filmmaker and writer. He made his directorial debut with the 2019 film Kataksha. He has since directed the films Tevar, Udham Patakh, and Taxali Gate.

== Career ==
In 2022, the director announced that he was working on Javed Iqbal 2, a planned sequel to Javed Iqbal: The Untold Story of a Serial Killer but the project came to a halt later that year.

== Filmography ==
Key
| † | Denotes films that have not yet been released |

=== Director and Writer ===
| Year | Title | Notes |
|---|---|---|
| 2019 | Kataksha | |
| 2019 | Tevar | |
| 2021 | Sheenogai | |
| 2022 | Udham Patakh | |
| 2023 | Kukri | |
| 2023 | Daadal | |
| 2023 | Shotcut | |
| 2023 | Super Punjabi | |
| 2024 | Taxali Gate | |
| 2026 | Mera Lyari | |
| 2026 | Fasaana Mart Ka | |
