= Syra Yousuf =

Pakistani model, actress, and singer (born 1988)

- سائرہ یوسف
- Born: 20 April 1988 (age 38); Peshawer, Khyber Pakhtunkhwa, Pakistan
- Occupations: Actress; model
- Years active: 2006–present
- Spouse: Shahroz Sabzwari (m. 2012; div. 2020)
- Children: 1
- Relatives: Alishba Yousuf (sister)

Syra Yousuf (Urdu: سائرہ یوسف) is a Pakistani model, former VJ, an actress and Singer who works in Urdu television series and films.

== Career ==
Syra began her career in 2006 by appearing in a Cornetto TV commercial. Following that, she worked as a model for a year, appearing in various commercial.

In 2007, she started hosting as a VJ at MTV Pakistan for the shows Bheja Fry and Most Wanted.

Syra made her acting debut in 2011 with Hum TV's Mera Naseeb. She played the impactful character of Nazia in the drama, which was directed by Adnan Ahmed. Furthering her career, she played the role of Mariam in the drama series Mohabbat Rooth Jaye Toh (2011) and Soha in Bilqees Kaur (2012). Both projects received significant critical acclaim for their narratives and the cast's performance.

Subsequently, she played selected roles, that challenged her as an actress. Opting for characters such as Sarena in Tanhaiyaan Naye Silsilay (2012) alongside Marina Khan, Zoya in Coke Kahani (2012), and taking on the role of two characters Shabeeh/Neelam in the psychological drama Ru Baru (2014). Yousuf has garnered audience attention with her powerful performance in Sinf-e-Ahaan (2021) as Arzoo Daniel.

Syra has appeared in a number of films such as Chalay Thay Saath (2017) and Project Ghazi (2019). Her recent film Babylicious (2023), in which she stars alongside her ex-husband Sabzwari, has been released on Eid al-Adha in 2023.

== Personal life ==
On 21 October 2012, she married Shehroz Sabzwari, in a private nikah ceremony in Karachi. Their daughter, Nooreh, was born in 2014. In December 2019, the couple announced their separation and got divorced in February 2020.

== Filmography ==
=== Television ===
Year	Serial	Role	Ref(s)
2011	Mera Naseeb	Nazia Fahad/Nazia Shahbaz	
2011	Mohabbat Rooth Jaye Toh	Maryam	
2012	Bilqees Kaur	Soha Sultan	
2012	Tanhaiyan Naye Silsilay	Sarena	
2012	Coke Kahani	Zoya	
2013	Darmiyaan	Aalia	
2014	Ru Baru	Shabeeh/Neelam	
2016	Pasheman	Zartashaa	
2016	Rishta Hai Jaise Khawab Sa	Mehak	
2019	Meray Dost Meray Yaar	Zoya	
2021	Sinf-e-Aahan	Arzoo Daniel	

=== Films ===
Year	Film	Role	Notes	Ref(s)
2016	Ho Mann Jahaan	Herself	Special appearance in the song "Shakar Wandaan"	
2017	Chalay Thay Saath	Resham		
2019	Project Ghazi	Zara		
2019	Superstar	Laila Khan	Special appearance	
2022	Yaadein	Herself		
2023	Babylicious	Sabiha		

== Awards and nominations ==
Year	Serial/Film	Award	Category	Result	Ref(s)
2011	Mera Naseeb	Pakistan Media Awards	Best New Actress	Nominated	
2013	—N/a	Veet Celebration Of Beauty Awards	Most Beautiful Smile	Won	
2016	—N/a	2st Hum Style Awards	Most Stylish Actress - TV	Won	
2017	—N/a	Hum Style Awards	Most Stylish Actress - Film	Nominated	
2018	Chalay Thay Saath	Galaxy Lollywood Awards	Best Female Debut	Won	
2018	Chalay Thay Saath	Galaxy Lollywood Awards	Best Actor in a Leading Role Female	Nominated	
2022	Sinf-e-Aahan	Conclave Pakistan			
