= Iqraar =

Pakistani television series

- Title screen
- Genre: Social drama Family drama
- Written by: Sarwat Nazir
- Directed by: Babar Javed
- Starring: Resham; Faysal Qureshi; Maheen Rizvi
- Country of origin: Pakistan
- Original language: Urdu
- No. of seasons: 1
- No. of episodes: 22

Production
- Producers: A & B Entertainment
- Production location: Karachi
- Running time: 45–50 minutes

Original release
- Network: Geo Entertainment
- Release: 21 October 2014 – 24 March 2015

Iqraar (Urdu: اقرار, lit. 'Confession') is a 2014 Pakistani drama television series directed by Babar Javed which aired on Geo TV on Tuesday nights at 8:00 p.m. The first episode was aired on 24 October 2014. The series is written by Sarwat Nazir, produced by A&B Productions and stars Resham, Faysal Qureshi and Maheen Rizvi in lead roles. The story is about a married couple, Shahbaz and Shiza, who are living a happy life, but Shahbaz marries his rich cousin Hajra, whose husband has died, which opens a new chapter in their life.

== Synopsis ==
Iqraar chronicles the lives of Shahbaz and Shiza, a perfect couple living in love and harmony. However, things start to take a bitter turn when Shiza finds out about Shahbaz's second marriage to Hajra. Hajra hails from a wealthy family in a village, however, after her husband's death she is left alone to safeguard her inherited wealth. Hajra doubts and fears that her brother-in-law would harm her and take her money away. To protect Hajra, Shahbaz agrees to marry her as he himself suffers from a series of financial constraints. Appalled by Shahbaz's second marriage, Shiza finds comfort in the presence of her ex-lover Safeer however Safeer further complicates the matter which leaves Shiza with no choice but to return to Shahbaz. Hajra welcomes her with an open heart and Shiza appreciates her kind behaviour. The three of them find their peace with each other but how long will they continue to coexist together?

== Cast ==
- Resham as Hajra
- Faysal Qureshi as Shabaaz
- Maheen Rizvi as Shiza
- Shamoon Abbasi
- Qaiser Naqvi as Naila's mother
- Umair Leghari
- Seemi Pasha
- Ali Tabish
- Ashan (Child Actor)
- Aijaz Aslam (Cameo)

== Soundtrack ==
The original soundtrack of Iqrar is composed by Waqar Ali and the vocals are provided by Hina Nasrullah.
