= List of Bashar Momin episodes =

The following is the list of episodes for Geo television drama serial Bashar Momin. The drama serial formally began 14 March 2014. Serial Individual episodes are numbered as follow.

== Drama Overview ==
| Series | Episodes | Direction | Writer | Channel | Lead Cast | Originally released | |
| Series | Episodes | Direction | Writer | Channel | Lead Cast | First released | Last released |
|---|---|---|---|---|---|---|---|
| 1 | 32 | Syed Ali Raza Usama | Zanjabeel Asim | Geo TV | Faisal Qureshi; Sami Khan; Mazhar Yasir; Ushna Shah; Sundas Tariq; Mahin Rizvi | 14 March 2014 | 8 November 2014 |

== Episode list ==
Following is the listing of episodes with short summaries.

=== Synopsis ===
Set in 2014, the engagement ceremony of Rudaba (Ushna Shah) is held with none other than Buland Bakhtiar (Sami Khan), who lives in America and works at the World Bank on a reputed post but Rudaba thinks that he is going to be some arrogant and rude brat, who doesn’t possess any love for his home country and values family. Her father tries his level best to make her understand that Buland is a good person and that he is not an inch of what she thinks of him. Buland is Bakhtiar’s son, and Bakhtiar loves Rudaba like his own daughter. Rudaba is one simple, innocent, down to earth and family oriented girl whose life revolves around her father and brother Adil (Yasir Mazher). Adil lives with his wife Sahira (Maheen Rizvi) who is big-headed, swollen with pride, rude and an outspoken women, living a luxurious life with her husband on her brother’s expenses. Adil works for Bashar Momin (Sahira’s brother). He makes his black money white illegally, which is why he lives in a separate house as Adil and Rudaba’s father has been a sincere and an honest bureaucrat throughout his life, so he wouldn’t allow his son to do such illegal stuff. No father would want such a life for his son. Furthermore, after Rudaba’s engagement, Sahira felt insulted as Rudaba’s father gave an insulting answer to Adil’s questions regarding Rudaba’s engagement. So Sahira tries her best and somehow succeeds in manipulating Rudaba’s mind and filling her brain with crap against Buland and his character. Rudaba, being innocent, actually believes what so ever Sahira says to her and complains to her father saying that no one can be that merciless, not even with his own daughter, but then he makes her understand that Sahira has this ability to control other’s mind, and that don’t let her do this to you. Bashar Momin’s appearance was unkind, arrogant, rude, and cruel. He has everything, be it money – power – status – fame and name but, he didn’t have happiness (this was obvious). Tayabba (Sundas Tariq), Sahira and Bashar’s younger sister, had been engaged twice, with those engagements being called off because of Bashar’s reputation. His pride once again leads to the engagement being broken off. He may be stiff, rude and arrogant from the outside but there is a soft heart that possess kindness, which is present there for her sister. Conclusively, Rudaba’s father and father-in-law get murdered by probably a mobile snatcher.

=== Season 1 ===
| No. overall | No. in series | Title | Setting | Original release date |
|---|---|---|---|---|
| 1 | 1 | "Introduction to Characters" | 2014 | 14 March 2014 |
Rudaba (Ushna Shah) gets engaged with her father's (Shehryar Zaidi) friend's (Anwar Iqbal) son Buland (Sami Khan), who lives in America. Rudaba is reluctant on her engagement as she had considered that Buland has had a western brought up. Rudaba's sister in law, Sahira (Mahin Rizvi), creates misunderstandings between her and Buland saying that she does not know anything about her fiance. Sahira's sister, Tayyaba (Sundas Tariq), brought a birthday gift for Sahira on the behalf of his brother, Bashar (Faisal Qureshi), where she gets to know that Tayyaba's second fiance has not been contacting her since a few days. Sahira invites the parents of Salman, where they face the humiliating behaviour of Bashar. They break the engagement on grounds of the family's ill reputation and black-money business. Rudaba's and Buland's fathers go on a drive on the sea side where they are robbed and killed.
| 2 | 2 | "...Death of Rudaba and Buland fathers" | 2014 | 21 March 2014 |
Rudaba is shocked after the death of his father, while everyone is wondering why Buland didn't show up at the funeral. Rudaba shifts to her brother's house which is owned and was gifted by Bashar to her sister on her marriage as a gift. Tayyaba mourns over the breaking of her engagement with Salman, Bashar tries to bribe Salman and forces him to marry Tayyaba, but he refuses to do so. Bashar comes to Sahira to discuss about Tayyaba where he encounters Rudaba, who gets frightened by the behaviour of Bashar. Sahira tries to make Tayyaba understand that Bashar will find a groom for her while she consistently blames Bashar for her ceased engagement, due to his behaviour towards others.

== See also ==
- Bashar Momin
- List of Pakistani actresses
- List of Pakistani actors
- List of Pakistani television serials
