= Mera Pehla Pyar =

- Genre: Drama
- Written by: Syed Zain Raza; Jewairia Hafeez
- Directed by: Sohail Javed
- Starring: Faysal Quraishi; Shazia Naz; Sana Javed; Nausheen Shah
- Opening theme: "Naina Tere" by Shiraz Uppal and Qurat-ul-Ain Balouch
- Country of origin: Pakistan
- Original language: Urdu
- No. of episodes: 19

Production
- Producers: Babar Javed; Asif Raza Mir
- Production location: Karachi, Sindh
- Cinematography: Kaleem Hussain
- Editor: Abbas Naqvi
- Running time: 40 minutes
- Production company: A&B Entertainment

Original release
- Network: ARY Digital
- Release: 20 October 2012 – 16 March 2013

Mera Pehla Pyar is a Pakistani television drama series aired on ARY Digital. It is written by Syed Zain Raza and Jewairia Hafeez, directed by Sohail Javed, and produced by Asif Raza Mir and Babar Javed. It stars Faysal Quraishi, Shazia Naz and Sana Javed.

== Plot ==
Hamid and Amna have arrived from Islamabad to visit their son Taha, his wife Aisha and their nine-year-old daughter Hira. Amna notices the consistent absence of Aisha from the house and it is obvious to her that her granddaughter is being neglected. Taha has been married upon the wishes of his strict, yet loving mother, to her niece, Aisha, who is struggling to balance her family life and her career as a model. Taha is a compassionate and compromising husband who understands his wife's commitment to her career and tries to find a balance between his job and the family and ends up playing the role of both the mother and father to their daughter. Taha's charm also extends at his workplace as his co-worker Zara is enthralled by his ability to manage his work and married life; however he makes it very clear to her that she is just a colleague to him. However, for Taha things are not going well in their marriage as Hira begins to feel insecure about her mother's love and neglect, causing confrontations between Taha and Aisha as they struggle to maintain a balance in their married life.

== Cast ==
- Faysal Qureshi as Taha
- Nausheen Shah as Aisha
- Shazia Naz as Maira
- Sana Javed as Zaara
- Seemi Pasha as Zarva
- Laila Zuberi as Amna
- Shehryar Zaidi as Hamid
- Arisha Razi as Hira
- Aijaz Aslam as Irfan

== Soundtrack ==
The show's theme song Naina Tere was composed by Shiraz Uppal and sung by Shiraz Uppal and Qurat-ul-Ain Balouch with lyrics by Sabir Zafar. The song plays in the last episode during Taha and Maira's wedding.

Track list
No.	Title	Singer(s)	Length
1.	"Naina Tere"	Shiraz Uppal and Qurat-ul-Ain Balouch	3:57
