= Kis Din Mera Viyah Howay Ga season 4 =

Kis Din Mera Viyah Howay Ga
- Season 4
- Poster Card of Season 4
- Starring: Aijaz Aslam; Faysal Qureshi; Fakhr-e-Alam; Ghana Ali
- No. of episodes: 31

Release
- Original network: Geo Entertainment
- Original release: 17 May – 18 June 2018

Kis Din Mera Viyah Howay Ga (Season 4) is a Pakistani comedy series that aired on Geo Entertainment which is the fourth season of Kis Din Mera Viyah Howay Ga as Ramadan special sitcom. Previously the series has premiered its season 1, 2 and 3 in 2011, 2012, and 2013 respectively. Every year new female leads are introduced whereas the main characters of Nazaakat (Aijaz Aslam) and Sheedo (Faysal Qureshi) remain the same.

The serial premiered it 4th season after a gap of five years on 17 May 2018. Comedy serial re-run on the channel from 25 August 2018 followed by Tohmat and aired weekly.

This season marks the first appearance of Ghana Ali, internet sensation Shafaat Ali, Fakhr-e-Alam and Yashma Gill in this comedy series franchise. This season is produced by Aijaz Aslam's own production house, Ice Media and Entertainment. Aijaz Alsam also reprises a double role in the sitcom as antagonist Don Bhai and Salman Khan die-hard fan Chaudhary Nazakat.

== Plot ==
Don, totally homomorphic and alike person of Nazakat, is here on Earth. Can Nazakat have a wedding in this season, or will Don have a day?

== Cast and characters ==
Actors	Character	Role
Aijaz Aslam	Chaudhary Nazakat/Don	Son of Ch.Takat, and brother of Don and Ch.Barkat
Faysal Qureshi	Sheeda/Sheedo/Jabar Khan/Samso Sehgawara	Real name is Sheeda but he disguises himself into several characters like Sheedo, Jabar Khan, Samso Sehgawara.
Maira Bangash	Jeanie	Johny Dollar's Girlfriend
Fakhr-e-Alam	Maseedo/KaKa/Maddy	Disguiser in the DIG Ejaz House, just like Sheedo.
Ghana Ali	Hania	Taniya's Sister
Hashim Butt	Chaudhary Barkat	Son of Ch.Takat and brother of Ch.Nazakat and Don
Sangeeta	Zubaida/Chaudrain	1st wife of Ch.Barkat.
Yashma Gill	Taniya	Haniya's Sister
Shafaat Ali	Shafaat/Chacha Hero	Bhateeja of Ch.Nazakat and Son of Ch.Barkat and Hameeda
Shermeen Ali	Masooma Pyaari	Don Secretary
Salahudin Tunio	DIG Ejaz	Father of Haniya and Taniya
Naveed Raza	Johnny dollar/Rose Marry	
Sophia Ahmed	Shahnaz Phupho	Sister of DIG Ejaz
Ali Salman	Chaudhary Takat	Father of Ch.Nazakat, Don and Ch.Barkat
Humaira Zahid	Hameeda	2nd wife of Ch.Barkat and Mother of Shafaat
Adnan Shah Tipu	Inspector Saleem	An Inspector in the city.
Ayaz Ahmed	Subugtageen	Male Mad in DIG's House
Asma Saif	Gulabo	Female Mad in DIG's House
Wajhi Farooqi	Sata	Guy of Don.
Faysal Mehmood Khan	Wata	Guy of Don.

== Season overview ==
Season	No. of episodes	Originally broadcast (Pakistan)	
Season	No. of episodes	First episode	Last episode
4	31	17 May 2018	18 June 2018

== Broadcasting Overview ==
Country	Network	Series premiere	Note
Pakistan	Geo Entertainment	17 May 2018	Urdu

== See also ==
- List of programs broadcast by Geo TV
- Geo Entertainment
- Suno Chanda
