= Shazia Naz =

Pakistani model and actress

- Born: Shazia Naz; 5 August 1988 (age 37); Karachi, Sindh, Pakistan
- Occupations: Actress, model
- Years active: 2012–present

Shazia Naz is a Pakistani model and actress. She made her on-screen debut in ARY Digital's Mera Pehla Pyar opposite Faysal Quraishi and since then has appeared in many television series. She made her cinematic debut with the 2017 film Josh: Independence Through Unity.

Naz is keen to work in dramas that focus on the struggles of women in both their professional and personal lives and highlight social issues and taboos. Some issues closest to her heart are the dowry culture and feminine hygiene issues.

== Filmography ==
- Josh: Independence Through Unity

=== Television ===
| Year | Title | Role | Notes |
|---|---|---|---|
| 2012–13 | Mera Pehla Pyar | Maira | |
| 2013 | Ishq Mein Teray | Cuckoo | |
| 2014 | Dil Majboor Sa Lagay | | |
| 2014 | Mausam | Mehreen | |
| 2014 | Mehram | | |
| 2015 | Meray Dil Meray Musafir | | |
| 2016 | Tum Meri Ho | | |
| 2016 | Bin Roye | Soniya | |
| 2017 | Kuch Na Kaho | Sajal | |
| 2021 | Dikhawa | | Episode "Rishtey Naatay"; 1 May 2021 |
| 2021 | Makafaat | | Episode "Main"; 25 March 2020 |
