= Ahsas =

- Genre: Romantic; Family Drama
- Written by: Qaisara Hayat
- Directed by: Najaf Bilgrami
- Starring: Ghana Ali; Noman Ijaz; Sarah Khan; Fariya Hassan; (For entire cast see below)
- Opening theme: Nandini Srikar; Lyrics by Ayub Khawar
- No. of episodes: 24 episodes

Production
- Producer: Aijaz Aslam
- Cinematography: Kashif Jabbar; Sarfaraz Ahmed
- Production companies: Ice Media & Entertainment

Original release
- Network: Urdu 1
- Release: 19 October 2016

Ahsas (Urdu: احساس, lit. 'Realization') is a Pakistani romantic drama serial aired on Urdu1. Produced by Ice Media & Entertainment and directed by Najaf Bilgarami. The series premiered on 19 October 2016.

== Plot ==
Adil, a successful businessman, leads a peaceful life with his wife, Akira. Adil's son, Zohaib, is unhappy with his career-minded wife, Marium, while his daughter, Nimra, leads a miserable life with her controlling husband, Saqib. Hina is the sole breadwinner of her family, comprising her mother, Ishrat, two younger sisters, Huma and Manaal and a brother Hannan. Hina works as a salesgirl in a jewellery shop. She gets engaged to her colleague, Babar.

Adil gets introduced to Hina when he buys a necklace for Akira from her shop. Akira dies in the next few days, leaving Adil heartbroken. Adil is very depressed and his health deteriorates after the death of Akira. Marium, Zohaib, Saqib and Nimra are too busy in their lives to take care of him. So Marium and his sister comes with up an idea of getting Adil married to one of her known aunt who is well settled in life, similar age and widowed. They also prepared an agreement to get her signed specifying that she or her sons wouldn’t get any share in their property. But after meeting her, Adil doesn’t feel any bonding with her even after her constant perusals.

On the other hand, after Seeing Babar's selfish behaviour, Hina breaks her engagement and quits the job. She starts working at a restaurant. One day, she bumps into Adil, who informs her about Akira's death. Adil hires Hina as a tutor for his grandson, Zeeshan. Hina’s aunt gets one prospective groom for her but his family turns out to be greedy. They don’t support her decision of helping her maternal family after the wedding makes especially her desire to get her siblings study hard and then settle in life. Finally she denies to marry that guy. She asks Adil to marry her so that she can fulfil her responsibility towards her family even after marriage. By seeing Hina’s commitment towards her family, her selfless spirit and a dream of Akira approving Hina as her wife convinces Adil to marry her. Adil marries Hina against his children's wishes.

Hina eventually gives birth to a son. Adil dies, leaving a significant part of his property in Hina's name. Nimra, Saqib, Zohaib and Marium conspire against Hina but eventually give up seeing her kindness. Nimra and Zohaib feel touched by Hina's selfless behaviour.

== Cast ==
- Noman Ijaz as Adil
- Sarah Khan as Hina
- Ghana Ali as Marium
- Wahaj Ali as Zohaib
- Yasir Mazhar as Saaqib
- Fariya Hassan as Nimra
- Manzoor Qureshi as Bhai jaan
- Nida Mumtaz as Hina's mother
- Humera Zahid as Huma
- Rida Khan as Manaal
- Yasir as Hanaan
- Heena as Natasha
- Samia Naz as Appa ( Saakim's elder sister )
- Falak (Child actor) as Aima
- Shifa (Child actor) Zeeshaan

=== Guest appearances ===
- Faysal Qureshi as Sarmad
- Zeba Bakhtiar as Akira
- Laila Wasti as Sanobaar
- Faiza Gillani as Di (Marium's elder sister)
- Noman Habib as Babar
