= Yaariyan =

Yaariyan may refer to:

- Yaariyan (2008 film), an Indian Punjabi-language film
- Yaariyan (2014 film), an Indian Hindi-language film
  - Yaariyan 2, a 2023 Indian Hindi-language film, a stand alone sequel to the 2014 film
- Yaariyan (TV series), a 2019 Pakistani drama series

== See also ==
- Yariyan, a 2010 Pakistani TV series
