= Samiya Mumtaz =

Pakistani actress

- سمیعہ ممتاز
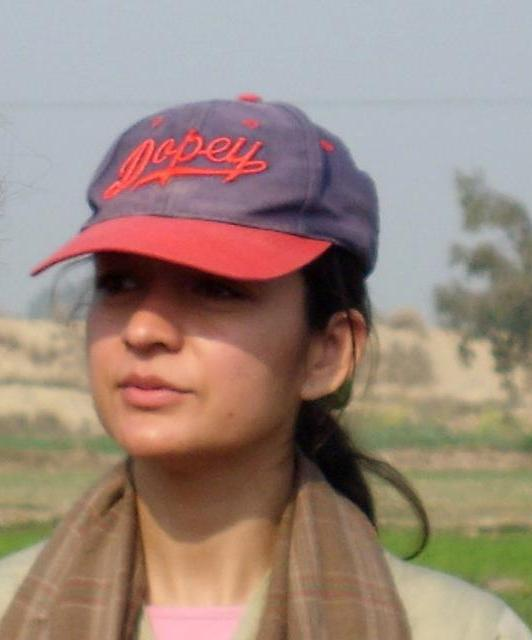
- Samiya Mumtaz in 2010
- Born: Samiya Khan Mumtaz
- Occupation: Film actress

Samiya Mumtaz (Urdu: سمیعہ ممتاز) is a Pakistani film and television actress. She has performed in several TV dramas. Her accolades include two Hum Awards and three Lux Style Awards nominations.

== Career ==
Initially appearing in several musicals shows and in recurring roles in television serials of Pakistan Television Corporation, Mumtaz had her major role as an adult in the Shahid Nadeem-directed drama serial Zard Dopehar, which aired in 1995. While hosting a talk show, she was noticed by Umera Ahmed who chose her as the lead of the television adaptation of her book Meri Zaat Zarra-e-Benishaan. Mumtaz played the role of an ill-fated woman in the eponymous series which aired in 2009–10 on Geo Entertainment, the role earning her the Best Television Actress nomination at the 10th Lux Style Awards. She is also notable for her performance in drama serials such as Yaariyan. She also started off as a theater personality and then moved to television. Mumtaz then depicted a selfless mother in the drama Maaye Ni, playing the mother of Sami Khan and Fahad Mustafa's characters. Her antagonistic role in the biographical-romance Sadqay Tumhare as a short tempered and abusive Rasheeda earned her praise from critics and a Hum Award as well. She then appeared in the titular role of Maryam in drama Ali Ki Ammi portraying a hard-hitting and selfless woman. Little praise come from her performance of a timid yet supportive mother of a sexually abused child in social dramaUdaari. In 2022, her performance in the mystery drama Sang-e-Mah was well-received by critics where she appeared as Zarsanga, a character loosely based on Gertrude.

Mumtaz made her film debut in 2014 in a drama thriller film Dukhtar, written and directed by Afia Nathaniel. She also starred in a family drama film Moor directed by Jami, released in 2015. She will play the role of Fatima Jinnah in Danial K Afzal's upcoming web series based on her life.

== Early life and ancestry ==
Samiya is the daughter of Khawar Mumtaz, a member of Women's Action Forum (WAF) and the chairperson of National Commission on the Status of Women (NCSW) for three consecutive terms from 2013 to 2019. Her father is Kamil Khan Mumtaz, a prominent architect and writer. Her mother's great-aunt was Ismat Chugtai. Her aunt is Kausar S. Khan, another WAF member and prominent researcher in Karachi.

== Filmography ==
=== Film ===
Key
†	Denotes films that have not yet been released

Year	Film	Role	Language	Notes	Ref(s)
2013	Zinda Bhaag	Elite Woman	Urdu/Punjabi	Cameo	
2014	Dukhtar	Allah Rakhi	Urdu/Pashto		
2015	Moor	Palwasha	Urdu/Pashto		
2016	Jeewan Hathi	Samiya	Urdu		
2019	Zindagi Tamasha	Farkhanda	Urdu/Punjabi		
2022	Kamli	Aalima	Urdu	Cameo	
2022	Tich Button	Kulsoom	Urdu		
2023	Gunjal	Najma	Urdu		
2025	Neelofar	Dr. Shagufta Hussain	Urdu		
2026	Mera Lyari	Shakira			

=== Television ===
Year		Role	Network	Ref(s).
1992	Tansen	Jodha Bai	PTV	
1995	Zard Dopehar	Sanyya	PTV	
2009	Dil-e-Nadan	Farah		
2009	Meri Zaat Zarra-e-Benishan	Saba Kareem	Geo Entertainment	
2010	Haal-e-Dil	Farah		
2010	Yariyan	Rida		
2010	Daddy	Anya		
2011	Maaye Ni	Sabiha		
2012	Pathjar Ke Baad	Hadiya	Urdu 1	
2012	Teri Raah Main Rul Gai	Zehra		
2013	Ranjish Hi Sahi	Yumna		
2013	Zindagi Teray Bina	Samina		
2014	Bay Emaan Mohabbat	Marya		
2014	Do Saal Ki Aurat	Hajra		
2014	Sadqay Tumhare	Rasheeda	Hum TV	
2015	Ali Ki Ammi	Maryam Nadir		
2016	Udaari	Sajida	Hum TV	
2016	Faltu Larki	Mah Para		
2017	Chanar Ghati	Jahan Ara		
2021	Dil Na Umeed To Nahi	Najma	PTV Home / TV One	
2022	Sang-e-Mah	Zarsanga	Hum TV	
2022	Mor Moharan	Almas		
2023	Jindo	Bandi	Green Entertainment	
2023	Wonderland	Narani Bi		
2023	Ishq Murshid	Zubaida Sikandar	Hum TV	
2023	Rang Badley Zindagi	Samina		
2024	Zard Patton Ka Bunn	Nasreen	Hum TV	
2024	BOL Kahani	Rehana		
2024	Tan Man Neel o Neel	Farah	Hum TV	
2025	Pehli Barish	Maleeha	Geo Entertainment	
2026	Zanjeerain	Bibi Jan	HUM TV	
2026	Mitti De Baway	Mai Pathaan	Green Entertainment	

=== Telefilm ===
Year	Title	Role	Notes
2015	Tum Miley Ho Yun	Aliya's mother	Hum TV

=== Web series ===
Year		Role	Platform	Notes
2020	Aagay Barho	Nadia	YouTube	
2021	Dhoop Ki Deewar	Sunanda	ZEE5	
2021	Qatil Haseenaon Ke Naam	Mai Malki	ZEE5	
2023	Rukhsana	Rukhsana	Deikho	
2023	Khoj	Officer Zainab	Shoq	

== Awards and nominations ==
Year	Award	Category	Work	Result
2011	10th Lux Style Awards	Best TV Actress (Satellite)	Meri Zaat Zarra-e-Benishan	Nominated
2011	3rd Pakistan Media Awards	Best TV Actress	Mai Nee	Nominated
2015	14th Lux Style Awards	Best Film Actress	Dukhtar	Nominated
2015	1st Galaxy Lollywood Awards	Best Actor in a Leading Role (female)	Dukhtar	Nominated
2015	3rd Hum Awards	Best Performance in a Negative Role	Sadqay Tumhare	Won
2015	3rd Hum Awards	Most Impactful Character	Sadqay Tumhare	Won
2016	15th Lux Style Awards	Best Lead Actress in a Film	Moor	Nominated
2016	2nd Galaxy Lollywood Awards	Best Actor in a Leading Role (female)	Moor	Nominated
2017	5th Hum Awards	Best Supporting Actress	Udaari	Nominated
2017	5th Hum Awards	Most Impactful Character	Udaari	Nominated
2017	3rd Galaxy Lollywood Awards	Best Actor in a Supporting Role (Female)	Jeewan Hathi	Nominated
2024	9th Hum Awards	Best Supporting Actress	Sang-e-Mah	Won
