= Dil Ka Kia Rung Karun =

- دِل کا کیا رنگ کروں
- Genre: Drama Serial
- Written by: Khurram Abbas
- Directed by: Saife Hassan
- Starring: Noor Hassan Rizvi; Sana Javed, Aijaz Aslam; Sidra Batool
- Opening theme: "Dil Ka Kya Rang Karun" (×2)
- Country of origin: Pakistan
- Original language: Urdu
- No. of episodes: 19

Production
- Producer: Momina Duraid
- Running time: 30–45 minutes

Original release
- Network: Hum TV
- Release: 1 March – 10 July 2015

Dil Ka Kia Rung Karun (Urdu: دِل کا کیا رنگ کروں), is a Pakistani romantic drama serial that was first aired on 1 March 2015. It had 19 episodes. The last of its 19 episodes aired on 10 July 2015. The show stars Noor Hassan Rizvi, Sana Javed, Aijaz Aslam and Sidra Batool in leading roles. It aired on every Sunday at 9:10 pm.

== Cast ==
- Noor Hassan Rizvi as Danyal
- Sana Javed as Aizah
- Aijaz Aslam as Dr. Imaad
- Sidra Batool as Horiya
- Amber Wajid as Zareen
- Emmad Irfani as Shoaib
- Khalid Anam
- Seemi Pasha
- Azra Mansoor as Zareen's mother
- Mariyam Khalif as Dua (child star)

== Plot ==
The Story revolves around a young girl, who has just started her married life, faces a dreadful accident. The accident left her with the dead body of her beloved husband and a label, "widow." Now, all she can do is to go through the taunts and sympathy, people throw towards her. What will she do to change all this? Will she be able to change her position? Will this male dominant society let her live on her own?
