= Qaid-e-Tanhai =

Pakistani TV series

- Title screen
- Genre: Romance; Family
- Directed by: Babar Javed
- Starring: Savera Nadeem; Faisal Qureshi; Saba Hameed; Sunita Marshall; Neelam Muneer
- Country of origin: Pakistan
- No. of episodes: 20

Production
- Executive producer: Momina Duraid
- Running time: 45–50 minutes
- Production company: A & B Productions

Original release
- Network: Hum TV
- Release: 22 October 2010 – 18 March 2011

Qaid-e-Tanhai (Urdu: قید تنہائی , lit. 'Solitary Confinement') is a Pakistani drama serial that originally aired on Hum TV from 22 October 2010 to 18 March 2011. It was written by Umera Ahmad and directed by Babar Javed. The drama serial was produced by A & B Productions.

== Plot ==
Qaid-e-Tanhai is the story of a couple, Aisha and Moiz, who love each other. They want to marry each other, but Moiz's mother, Aliya, gives a condition that if her daughter Maliha marries Aisha's brother, she will agree.

They get married but are later separated due to family and financial pressures that Aisha's mother in law had on Moiz. Aisha does not want Moiz to go overseas, insisting that the family isn't in a major financial trouble.

Influenced by his mother, Moiz goes overseas to earn money for his family, leaving Aisha devastated along with their daughter. Overseas, although he is working hard, he also befriends a female named Aneela. Moiz annoys Aisha by telling her about Aneela, and Aisha is mad at him. Aneela and Moiz are obviously dating at this point.

Worried, depressed Aisha waits for Moiz to come to Pakistan to visit her, but he does not come; years pass, but he doesn't come, influenced by his mother. In the meantime, Noor, Aisha's daughter, is growing up. She is fond of Jawad and thinks him as his father. Moiz's responsibility of raising his kids and supporting his wife, was fulfilled by another man, Jawad. Jawad eventually falls in love with Aisha and proposes her. She rejects but later softens by his talk.

Her mother-in-law overhears her and tells Moiz. He comes to Pakistan telling Aneela about Aisha, who is mad at him for not informing her about his marriage and child. But Jawad's mother rejects Aisha, and he leaves her. Aisha goes to her mother's house, where Maliha and her husband, i.e. Aisha's brother, insult her. Moiz in anger marries Aneela. He lies to Aneela that he has given divorce to Aisha.

Meanwhile, Moiz's sister Maliha's is about to get married. Aneela calls Maliha but Aisha answers. Aneela throws Moiz out of the house. After four to five years, she meets Moiz as Farhan, their child, wished to meet his father. Aneela dies in a car accident, and so Moiz goes to Pakistan.

There he meets Aisha. Noor is a grown up but is rebellious. She hates her father. Moiz introduces Farhan to everyone. Meanwhile, Aisha and Farhan develop a good bond. Moiz takes Aisha and Noor to London. In London, Noor spoils all the photos in Farhan's room. She becomes more immature and challenging.

Meanwhile, in Pakistan, Aliya feels sorry and realizes that she is being treated the same way by her other son Haseeb, Madiha and Maliha, the way she had treated Aisha. Noor gets admission in a university, and it is time for Aisha to leave UK.

In the last episode, Moiz apologizes to Aisha, and she also does the same. Moiz requests her not to go, and she doesn't. They all (Moiz, Aisha, Noor, and Farhan) are a happy family and are together.

== Cast ==
=== Main ===
- Aisha (Savera Nadeem)

She is a good daughter of her mother and falls in love with her maternal cousin Moiz. She marries Moiz, and her mother is also happy, although she shows some resistance first. But it is Moiz's mother who hates Aisha and troubles her. The whole family harasses her. She agrees to Jawad's marriage proposal by seeing his affection towards her daughter, but then her mother-in-law starts torturing her. She is treated like a servant.

- Moiz (Faisal Qureshi)

He falls in love with Aisha. But his mother and sister oppose this marriage. Problems arise when he leaves for the United Kingdom.

- Aliya (Saba Hameed)

Moiz's mother. She is the person who hates Aisha and creates differences between Aisha and Moiz. She doesn't see that Aisha is her sister's daughter and treats Aisha as a servant. Noor hates her because of her evil nature. She loves only her daughter.

- Aneela (Sunita Marshall)

She is the second wife of Moiz. She likes Moiz but becomes mad when she learns he is already married. But Moiz marries her, and she gives birth to a child. She later dies in an accident.

- Jawad (Syed Jibran)

He is engaged to be married to Moiz's sister. But due to his caring nature, Noor starts liking him and treats him like her father. Aisha, too, starts falling for him. But when Moiz's mother listens to a phone call, she starts harassing Jawad, too.

- Noor (Neelam Muneer)

She is Moiz's and Aisha's daughter. She is a disturbed child as she never got her father's love. She hates her Dadi (Moiz's mother) and talks to her rudely. She starts liking Jawad and treats him like her father. She hates Moiz and Aneela's son.

=== Supporting ===
- Asif Raza Mir as Moiz's friend

Moiz's friend in London who respects Aisha

- Lubna Aslam as Maliha

Moiz's sister, who marries Aisha's brother. She is the principal troublemaker, even worse than her mother. She is adamant that her son marry Noor, but Noor declines.

- Ismat Zaidi as Ammi/ Khala (Aisha's mother)

Aisha's mother, Moiz's khala, and later mother-in-law of Moiz's sister. She hates her younger sister and warns Aisha not to marry Moiz, not because she is conservative but because her sister is evil. She is a good mother-in-law, but her strained relationship with her younger sister leads to problems in Aisha's life. She is shocked when Aisha says she will marry Jawad but is happy when she learns that Aisha is going to the UK.

- Farhan

Moiz and Aneela's son. He is a sober child. He wants to befriend his step-sister Noor and respects his step-mother, Aisha.

== Release ==
=== Broadcast ===
Qaid-e-Tanhai originally premiered on Hum TV from 22 October 2010, to 18 March 2011.

It also aired in India on Zindagi from 28 September 2015 to 5 November 2015.

=== Digital release ===
- In July 2020, it was made available for streaming on Hum TV's Official YouTube Channel.

== Reception ==
=== Critical reception ===
A Substack-based reviewer praised the characters' portrayal, but critiqued its unprofound story, exaggerated characters, and weak screenplay.

=== Awards and nominations ===
Year	Awards	Category	Nominee(s)/ Recipient(s)	Result	Ref.
2012	Lux Style Awards	Best TV Actress - Satellite	Savera Nadeem	Won	
2012	Lux Style Awards	Best TV Writer	Umera Ahmed	Nominated	
2012	Lux Style Awards	Best Original Soundtrack	Riaz Ali Khan	Nominated	

3rd Pakistan Media Awards

- Nominated-Pakistan Media Award for Best TV Actress to Savera Nadeem
- Nominated-Pakistan Media Award for Best Supporting Actress to Neelam Muneer
