= Diya Jalay =

Pakistani television series

- Title screen
- Urdu: دِیا جلے
- Written by: Faiza Iftikhar
- Directed by: Babar Javed
- Starring: Savera Nadeem; Asif Raza Mir; Adnan Siddiqui
- Country of origin: Pakistan
- Original language: Urdu
- No. of episodes: 20

Production
- Producers: Asif Raza Mir; Babar Javed
- Running time: 35–40 minutes
- Production company: A & B Entertainment

Original release
- Network: ARY Digital
- Release: 4 January – 17 May 2010

Diya Jalay is a Pakistani television series directed by Babar Javed, who also co-produced it with Asif Raza Mir under their banner A & B Entertainment. It stars Savera Nadeem, Mir, Adnan Siddiqui and Faysal Quraishi in leading roles. It aired on ARY Digital from 4 January 2010 to 17 May 2010, with a total of 20 episodes.

Diya Jalay brought Nadeem back into the limelight, and she received a nomination for Best Television Actress – Satellite at the 10th Lux Style Awards for her performance.

== Plot ==
After a rift with her childhood fiance Sameer, Nadia refuses to marry him. She is criticized for this decision and forced to marry a middle aged widower Faizan Ali Shah due to her increasing age. He treats her not more than a known person and insults her due to her middle-class background but she tries to fulfill her duties and manages to get along with his children.

After years, when the children grow up Faizan decides her daughter Hania's marriage with Asfand but things get complicated when Asfand mistakes Nadia as Hania and falls for her. Faizan blames her to mess up his daughter's life to which she decides to leave him.

== Cast ==
- Savera Nadeem as Nadia
- Asif Raza Mir as Faizan Ali Shah
- Adnan Siddiqui as Asfand
- Faysal Quraishi as Sameer
- Neelam Muneer as Hania
- Babar Khan Hamza
- Maria Wasti as Seemab
- Ismat Zaidi as Nadia's mother
- Natash D'Souza

== Reception ==
A review from Dawn praised several performances including that of Nadeem, Mir, Siddiqui and Wasti but criticised some loop holes in the story and the slowly moving plot.

== Accolades ==
Year	Award	Category	Recipient(s)/ nominee(s)	Result	Ref.
2010	Lux Style Awards	Best Television Actress - Satellite	Savera Nadeem	Nominated	
