= Noor Bano (serial) =

Pakistani television series

- Genre: Family drama Romance
- Written by: Seema Ghazal
- Directed by: Fahim Burney
- Starring: Imran Abbas; Mahnoor Baloch
- Theme music composer: Rahat Fateh Ali Khan
- Country of origin: Pakistan
- Original language: Urdu
- No. of episodes: 18

Original release
- Network: Hum TV
- Release: 19 February – 18 June 2010

Noor Bano (Urdu: نور بانو) is a Pakistani drama television series written by Seema Ghazal and directed by Fahim Burney. It began airing from 19 February 2010 on Hum TV. The series was shot in New York City and Lahore. It has Imran Abbas and Mahnoor Baloch in lead roles.

== Plot ==
Noor Bano centres around an orphaned girl, Noor Bano, who is raised by her paternal uncle, Agha Ji, after her parents die in a car accident. Years later, Agha Ji forces her to marry his younger son, Murash, who sees Noor as an older sister and is uninterested in the marriage. He agrees only because of his father's promise to care for Noor. Murash leaves Pakistan right after their Nikah, without consummating their marriage. Noor, sensing his disinterest, urges him to marry the woman he loves. In New York, Murash marries his classmate Alvina.

Years later, Murash returns to Pakistan with Alvina, and Noor Bano convinces Agha Ji not to punish him. Alvina grows jealous of Murash’s attention towards Noor and demands a child. She eventually gives birth to a daughter, and after Agha Ji passes away, Murash inherits his role. Murash proposes to Noor Bano, but after spending a night with him, Noor disappears, leaving behind her jewellery by the seashore, making everyone believe she has drowned.

Five years later, Alvina receives a call from a school in Karachi about a boy named Hamza Murash Ali, which shocks her. Upon investigating, she finds Noor Bano alive and raising Hamza. Murash, learning his son has a heart condition, reconnects with Noor and Hamza. Alvina becomes jealous, leading to tensions between her and Murash. After a confrontation, Murash divorces Noor Bano, bringing their complicated relationship to a close.

== Cast ==
- Mahnoor Baloch as Noor Bano
- Imran Abbas as Agha Murash Ali Khan
- Nadia Hussain as Sarah Khan
- Tooba Siddiqui as Alvina
- Mustafa Qureshi as Agha Murad Ali Khan “Agha Ji”
- Bindiya as Alvina's mother
- Samina Ahmad as Bi Jaan
- Saad Imran as Hamza Ali Khan (Noor Bano & Murash's Son)

== International broadcast ==
The series was telecast in India on Zindagi in 2015, while also aired across MENA on MBC Bollywood in Arabic with the same title.

== Critical reception ==
While reviewing for the Dawn, a reviewer praised Imran Abbas's acting and the soundtrack but critiqued Tooba Siddiqui's acting, calling her a disappointment and also criticized Bindiya's performance and the predictability of the storyline.
