= Meri Saheli Meri Bhabi =

- Title screen
- Genre: Soap opera Family drama Romantic drama
- Created by: Babar Javed
- Written by: Tabseer Nishat
- Directed by: Nasir Wali
- Country of origin: Pakistan
- Original language: Urdu
- No. of seasons: 02
- No. of episodes: 231

Production
- Producer: Babar Javed
- Camera setup: Multi-camera setup

Original release
- Network: Geo Tv
- Release: 6 July 2016 – 24 May 2017

Meri Saheli Meri Bhabi is a Pakistani drama soap that first aired on Geo Tv on 6 July 2016 (first day of Eid). It is produced by Babar Javed. It aired from Monday to Friday at 7:30pm.The last episode aired on 24 May 2017. The total number of episodes was 231. The show also re-run on Geo Kahani under the title Bhabi Saath Nibhana.

== Series overview ==
Season	No. of episodes	Originally broadcast (Pakistan)	
Season	No. of episodes	First aired	Last aired
1	96	6 July 2016	18 November 2016
2	135	21 November 2016	24 May 2017

== Cast ==
- Aleezay Tahir as Fareeha
- Rida Isfahani/Amna Malik as Mehreen
- Hafsa Butt as Aiza
- Ikram Abbasi as Aryan
- Shahid Naqvi
- Shazia Gohar as Begum Agha
- Ali Ansari as Hammad
- Adil Wadia
- Fareeha Jabeen as Salma
- Syed Ali Hasan as Saarim
- Parveen Akbar as Shabana
- Neelam Gul
- Umar Hussnain
- Yashma Gill as Mooni
- Ramsha Khan as Sara
- Rohail Khan as Fawad

== See also ==
- Geo TV
- List of Pakistani television series
- List of programs broadcast by Geo Entertainment
