= Mariyam Khalif =

Pakistani actress (born 2007)

Mariyam Khalif مریم خلیف
- Born: 11 April 2007 (age 19); Karachi, Pakistan
- Occupations: Actress, model
- Years active: 2012–present
- Known for: Bashar Momin
- Website: http://mariyamkhalif.com/

Mariyam Khalif (Urdu: مریم خلیف), also known as Maryam, is a Pakistani former child actress who started her acting career on the television drama Parchayian aired on ARY Digital. Mariyam Khalif was born on 11 April 2007. She also worked in some TV commercials. She played the role of Pareezah in Bashar Momin, and of Shiza in ARY Digital drama serial Koi Nahi Apna. Her most popular role is of young Farah in Diyar-e-Dil later played by Maya Ali.

== Television ==
Year	Serial	Role	Channel
2012	Parchayian	Mariyam	ARY Digital
2013	Meri Beti	Iraj	ARY Digital
2013	Koi Nahi Apna	Shiza	ARY Digital
2014	Bashar Momin	Pareezay	GEO TV
2015	Dil Ka Kia Rang Karun	Dua	Hum TV
2015	Karb	Eman	Hum TV
2016	Sanam	Fatima	Hum TV
2016	Gila	Zubi	Hum TV
2017	Gustakh Ishq	Dua	Urdu1

== Films ==
- Shab-e-Zulmat as Guriya (Dead)

== TV commercials ==
Year	Product/Brand
2013	Sunsip Thanda Orange
2013	PTCL Broadband
2013	Olpers-Omang Dobaala Cream
2013	Tiger Biscuit
2013	Delux Paints
2014	Seasons Canola Oil
2014	QMobile G200
2015	Servis Shoes
2015	Needo Milk

== See also ==
- Bashar Momin
- Dil Ka Kia Rang Karun
- Karb
- Diyar-e-Dil
