= Babar Javed =

Pakistani producer and director

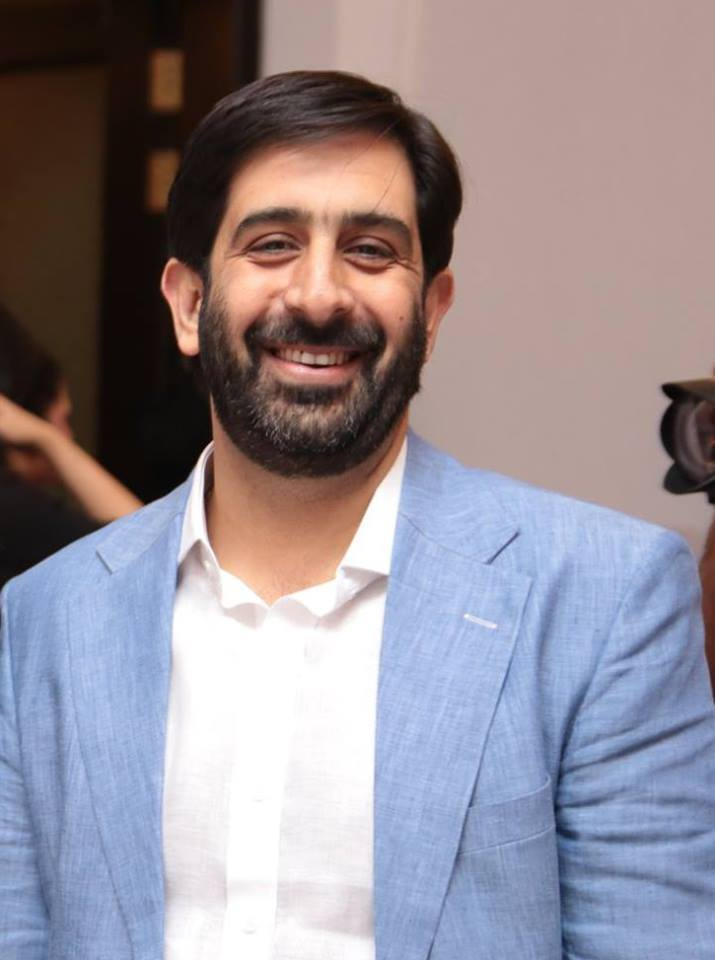
- Born: Babar Javed Mughal; Karachi, Sindh, Pakistan
- Education: Diploma in Production/Direction and TV Journalism from Asian Academy of Film & Television AAFT (India); Diploma in Film School from London Academy of Radio, Film and TV (UK); Director's course in Cinematography from Brighton School
- Occupations: film producer, television producer, television director, concept creator Production house A&B Entertainment GEO Entertainment, GEO Kahani, BJ Productions, and Big Magic
- Years active: 2001-present

Babar Javed (Urdu: بابر جاوید) is a Pakistani television and film producer and director. He has produced and directed series such as Meri Zaat Zarra-e-Benishan, Qaid-e-Tanhai, Mera Saaein, Main Abdul Qadir Hoon, Aasmanon Pay Likha, Bashar Momin, Adhoora Bandhan, and Mor Mahal, all under his production company A&B Entertainment that he co-founded with actor turned filmmaker Asif Raza Mir. Javed has earned eight Lux Style Awards as a director and producer. In 2016, he received his first ARY Film Award nomination for the producing 2015 biopic film Manto.

== Career ==
Javed started his career in 2001 as a director and producer, and later in 2009, he co-founded a production company A&B Entertainment with actor Asif Raza Mir and produced projects for Hum TV, ARY Digital, and Geo Entertainment. Their debut project, Diya Jalay, starring Savera Nadeem, earned them critical praise, and their claim to fame came with the 2010 ensemble cast drama serial starring Samiya Mumtaz, Meri Zaat Zarra-e-Benishan, by Umera Ahmed, that earned the duo as producers recognition and positive appraisal. In 2013, the duo merged their production company with Geo Entertainment for producing and directing the channel's projects only, prior to the merger they usually created projects for ARY Digital and Geo Entertainment. In 2026, he directed Humrahi, his first work as a director in 13 years.

== Filmography ==
=== Film ===
Film
Year	Title	As
2015	Manto	Producer

=== Television series ===
As producer and/or director
Year	Title	Director	Producer	Channel	References
2001	Game	Yes		PTV	
2006	Kuch Dil Ne Kaha	Yes		Geo TV	
2007	The Ghost	Yes		Hum TV	
2007	Manay Na Ye Dil	Yes		Hum TV	
2007	Man-o-Salwa	Yes		Hum TV	
2008	Meri Zaat Zarra-e-Benishan	Yes		Geo TV	
2009	Ishq Junoon Dewaangi	Yes		Hum TV	
2010	Main Abdul Qadir Hoon	Yes	Yes	Hum TV	
2010	Yaariyan	Yes	Yes	Geo TV	
2011	Khuda Aur Muhabbat		Yes	Geo TV	
2011	Ek Hatheli Pe Hina Ek Hatheli Pe Lahoo	Yes	Yes	Geo Entertainment	
2012	Mera Saaein (Season 2)	Yes	Yes	ARY Digital	
2014	Bashar Momin		Yes	Geo TV	
2016	Mera Dard Bayzuban		Yes	Geo TV	
2016	Shaam Dhaley		Yes	Geo TV	
2016	Yeh Chahatein Yeh Shiddatein		Yes	Geo TV	
2016	Meri Saheli Meri Bhabi		Yes	Geo TV	
2016	Babul Ka Angna		Yes	Geo TV	
2016	Joru Ka Ghulam		Yes	Geo TV	
2016	Sangdil		Yes	Geo TV	
2016	Iss Khamoshi Ka Matlab		Yes	Geo TV	
2016	Wafa (TV series)		Yes	Geo TV	
2016	Dhaani		Yes	Geo TV	
2016	Mor Mahal		Yes	Geo TV	
2017	Aao Laut Chalein		Yes	Geo TV	
2017	Hina Ki Khushboo		Yes	Geo TV	
2017	Adhoora Bandhan		Yes	Geo TV	
2017	Khan		Yes	Geo TV	
2018	Kaif-e-Baharan		Yes	Geo TV	
2018	Saaya season 1		Yes	Geo TV	
2018	Be Rehem		Yes	Geo TV	
2018	Umm-e-Haniya		Yes	Geo TV	
2024	Chand Nagar		Yes	BOL Network	
2024	Let's Try Mohabbat		Yes	Green TV	
2024	Yaar-e-Mann		Yes	Green TV	
2025	Raaja Rani		Yes	Hum TV	
2025	Judwaa		Yes	Hum TV	
2025	Meri Bahuain		Yes	Hum TV	
2026	Ghulam Bashah Sundari		Yes	Green Entertainment	
2026	Maa		Yes	Green Entertainment	
2026	Humrahi	Yes	Yes	Green Entertainment	
2026	Mere Paas Raho Tum		Yes	Express Entertainment	

==== Recurring television series ====
Year	Title	Channel	Season(s)	Role	References
Multi-Season Productions
2011–2012	Khuda Aur Muhabbat	Geo TV	Season 1	Producer	
2012–2013	Kis Din Mera Viyah Howay Ga	Geo TV	Season 1–2	Producer	
2014–2015	Malika-e-Aliya	Geo TV	Season 1–2	Producer	
2020	Tarap	Hum TV	Season 1–2	Producer	
2023-2024	Main Kahani Hoon	Express Entertainment	Season 1-2	Producer	

==== Uncredited ====
Television series
Year	Title	Channel	Role
2016	Thora Sa Aasman	Geo TV	Producer
2016	Dekho Chaand Aaya	Geo TV	Producer
2017	Bholi Bano	Geo TV	Producer
2017	Bedardi Saiyaan	Geo TV	Producer
2017	Rani	Geo TV	Producer
2017	Mera Haq	Geo TV	Producer
2017	Malkin (TV series)	Geo TV	Producer
2017	Tere Bina	Geo TV	Producer
2018	Khalish	Geo TV	Producer
2018	Zamani Manzil Kay Maskharay	Geo TV	Producer
2018	Meri Guriya	ARY Television	Producer
2018	Silsilay	Geo TV	Producer
2024	Mora Piya	Green TV	Producer
2024	Saraab	Aurlife TV	Producer

== Awards and nominations ==
List of accolades received by Babar Javed
Year	Award / Ceremony	Category	Work	Result	Ref(s)
2016	15th Lux Style Awards	Best Film	Manto	Nominated	
2016	15th Lux Style Awards	Best Director (Sarmad Sultan Khoosat)	Manto	Nominated	
2016	15th Lux Style Awards	Best Actor (Sarmad Sultan Khoosat)	Manto	Nominated	
2016	15th Lux Style Awards	Best Actress (Sania Saeed)	Manto	Nominated	
2016	15th Lux Style Awards	Best Supporting Actress (Nimra Bucha)	Manto	Nominated	
2016	15th Lux Style Awards	Best Playback Singer - Male (Ali Sethi - Aah Ko Chahiye)	Manto	Nominated	
2016	15th Lux Style Awards	Best Playback Singer - Female (Zebunnisa Bangash - Kya Hoga)	Manto	Nominated	
2016	2nd ARY Film Awards	Best Actor Jury (Sarmad Sultan Khoosat)	Manto	Won	
2016	2nd ARY Film Awards	Best Actress Jury (Sania Saeed)	Manto	Won	
2016	2nd ARY Film Awards	Best Film	Manto	Nominated	
2016	2nd ARY Film Awards	Best Director	Manto	Nominated	
2016	2nd ARY Film Awards	Best Actor (Sarmad Sultan Khoosat)	Manto	Nominated	
2016	2nd ARY Film Awards	Best Actress (Sania Saeed)	Manto	Nominated	
2016	2nd ARY Film Awards	Best Supporting Actress (Saba Qamar)	Manto	Nominated	
2016	2nd ARY Film Awards	Best Actor in a Negative Role (Akbar Subhani)	Manto	Nominated	
2016	2nd ARY Film Awards	Best Male Playback Singer (Ali Sethi - Aah Ko Chahiye)	Manto	Nominated	
2016	2nd ARY Film Awards	Best Female Playback Singer (Meesha Shafi - Mehram Dilaan De Nahi)	Manto	Nominated	
2016	18th Jaipur International Film Festival	Best Actor (Sarmad Sultan Khoosat)	Manto	Won	
2016	18th Jaipur International Film Festival	Best Editing	Manto	Nominated	
2016	18th Jaipur International Film Festival	Best Sound	Manto	Nominated	
2015	14th Lux Style Awards	Best Television Actor (Faisal Qureshi)	Bashar Momin	Nominated	
2014	4th Pakistan Media Awards	Best Sitcom	Kis Din Mera Viyah Howay Ga	Won	
2014	13th Lux Style Awards	Best TV Play (Satellite)	Daagh	Won	
2013	12th Lux Style Awards	Best TV Play (Satellite)	Mera Yaqeen	Nominated	
2012	11th Lux Style Awards	Best TV Play (Satellite)	Mera Saaein	Won	
2012	11th Lux Style Awards	Best TV Director	Mera Saaein	Nominated	
2012	11th Lux Style Awards	Best TV Play (Satellite)	Kis Din Mera Viyah Howay Ga	Nominated	
2012	11th Lux Style Awards	Best Original Soundtrack	Khuda Aur Mohabbat	Nominated	
2012	11th Lux Style Awards	Best Original Soundtrack	Qaid-e-Tanhai	Nominated	
2012	11th Lux Style Awards	Best Original Soundtrack	Main Abdul Qadir Hoon	Nominated	
2010	9th Lux Style Awards	Best TV Director	Ishq Junoon Deewangi	Nominated	
2009	8th Lux Style Awards	Best TV Director (Satellite)	Jhumka Jaan	Won	
2009	8th Lux Style Awards	Best TV Director (Satellite)	Khamoshiyan	Nominated	
2009	8th Lux Style Awards	Best TV Director (Satellite)	Manay Na Ye Dil	Nominated	
2008	7th Lux Style Awards	Best TV Director (Satellite)	Man-O-Salwa	Nominated	
2007	6th Lux Style Awards	Best TV Director (Satellite)	Kuch Dil Nay Kaha	Won	

== See also ==
- List of programs broadcast by Geo TV
