= Bashar Momin =

- Promotional poster
- Genre: Romance; Hatred; Thriller
- Written by: Zanjabeel Asim Shah
- Directed by: Syed Ali Raza Usama
- Starring: Faysal Qureshi; Ushna Shah; Sami Khan; Maheen Rizvi; Jinaan Hussain; Mariyam Khalif; Hina Khawaja Bayat; Nauman Ijaz; Hina Rizvi; Zeba Shehnaz
- Theme music composer: Waqar Ali
- Opening theme: "Man Moji" by Nida Arab and Abu Muhammad
- Composer: Mohsin Allah Ditta
- Country of origin: Pakistan
- Original language: Urdu
- No. of episodes: 32 (list of episodes)

Production
- Executive producers: Asif Raza Mir; Babar Javed
- Producer: Faysal Qureshi
- Production location: Karachi
- Cinematography: Farhan Golden; Adnan Bukhari
- Editors: Faizan Ghori; Waqas Karim
- Camera setup: Multi-camera setup
- Running time: 37 - 38 minutes
- Production company: A&B Entertainment

Original release
- Network: Geo TV
- Release: 14 March – 8 November 2014

Bashar Momin (Urdu: بشر مومن) is a 2014 Pakistani television series directed by Ali Raza Usama, written by Zanjabeel Asim Shah, and produced by Asif Raza Mir and Babar Javed under the production company A&B Entertainment. It stars Faysal Qureshi, Sami Khan, Maheen Rizvi, Jinaan Hussain, and Ushna Shah as leads.

Bashar Momin is one of the most expensive dramas ever made in Pakistan. It has been categorized in several genres due to its themes of jealousy, love, hatred, romance, and suspense. The drama first aired on Geo Entertainment on 14 March 2014 and ended on 8 November 2014. Due to its popularity, it also aired in India on Zindagi under the title Aks.

== Series overview ==
Rudaba is engaged to her father's best friend's son, Buland Bakhtiar, but is unhappy because she thinks she will not like him. Her brother, Adil, is married to Saira, who is a clever and manipulative woman. Saira is the sister of Bashar Momin, a rich money launderer who loves his sisters and wants them to be happy at any cost. He is looking for a suitable match for his little sister, Tayyaba, whose two engagements have been ruined by his bad reputation.

Rudaba's father and future father-in-law died in a street robbery accident. Adil has no way to contact Buland and carries out the burial. Rudaba, left alone, is forced to live with her brother despite her reluctance. In Adil's home, Saira tries to keep Adil apart from Rudaba.

Meanwhile, 90 crores of Bashar's money is at stake, which is stored in Adil's account. Adil and Saira go to America to save the money, and Rudaba now has to live in Bashar's house. She must also take care of Pareezay, Adil's daughter. Bashar scolds Rudaba often, but he eventually falls for her.

Buland, worried that his father has not been responding to his calls, returns to Pakistan. He learns that his father has died. He meets Rudaba, who falls in love with him. Buland also turns out to be Tayyaba's college fellow. Bashar, now in love with Rudaba, does not like Buland's and Rudaba's meetings. When Tayyaba mentions that Buland is a good person to Bashar, he, now in love with Rudaba, decides to separate Buland from Rudaba, for Tayyaba. He gets close to Rudaba, who considers him "bhai", to create misunderstandings between them. Buland, feeling sick of Rudaba's closeness to Bashar, ignores Rudaba. Rudaba realizes Bashar's intentions and clears the misunderstandings between her and Buland.

When Bashar knows Buland is meeting Rudaba, he comes out of Rudaba's bathroom unexpectedly to find Rudaba in the presence of Buland. Later, when Buland meets Rudaba, he turns off the power supply, and Rudaba accidentally says what she planned to say to Buland. Buland is heartbroken and returns to America. Soon Adil returns, and Rudaba returns to his home. Bashar tells Adil that he wants to marry Rudaba.

Saira and Bashar convince Adil, without letting him talk to Rudaba, that Rudaba and Bashar were too involved, manipulating the fact that Buland returned to America because he had no interest in the marriage. Meanwhile, Rudaba emails Buland the truth that Bashar did this so that Tayyaba could marry him. Adil agrees to Rudaba's marriage with Bashar. A day before the nikah, Rudaba tells her brother the truth. Back in the office, Adil is unable to refuse nikah in fear of Bashar's power. At the nikah ceremony, Buland returns after reading the email. After nikah, Bashar forces Rudaba to tell Buland that she actually loves Bashar and keeps him as a second option in case Bashar does not marry her. After learning this, Buland marries Tayyaba. After a few months, Tayyaba is pregnant, but Rudaba's rukhsaty is being ignored. On Adil's suggestion, Saira talks to Bashar about Rukhsaty, who tells her that he will divorce Rudaba because he cannot marry a woman who has been in love with another man.

Adil is infuriated when Bashar announces on a live program that he is single. He argues with Bashar who is determined to divorce Rudaba. Adil threatens that if Bashar divorces Rudaba, he will also divorce Saira. Adil leaves Saira with Bashar and moves into his father's home, saying that he will change his mind only if Bashar marries Rudaba. Buland learns that Rudaba had been forced, and offers Rudaba to divorce Tayyaba after delivery, and they would marry again. Bashar discovers their plan and decides not to divorce Rudaba. He says sorry to Adil and marries Rudaba. Back at home, Buland flies to America, leaving Tayyaba behind. Bashar, who is unsatisfied with the marriage, takes revenge on Rudaba and treats her harshly. When Rudaba learns of Bashar's past life and the reason behind his attitude and anger she eventually falls in love with him. Meanwhile, Bashar becomes attracted to her innocence and but resists.

On his father's anniversary, Bashar fulfills everyone's wishes. Rudaba also wants to ask him for something, but he refuses to listen because he thinks she will ask for a divorce. She asks him to give her a normal life. He does so, but keeps his distance from her. She tries to tell him that she loves him, but he does not believe her.

Bashar plays piano every night and thinks of his mother, who, in love with her old college mate Zafar, left his father and her four children. While he loves Rudaba for her beauty and innocence, he also thinks of her as his mother. He fears that Rudaba will also leave him for Buland. One day he notices Rudaba seeing her in the piano room and he screams at her. Rudaba falls faint and the doctors announce that she is pregnant. Bashar fears that Rudaba will leave his child as his mother had done, and convinces and threatens her to drink juice which contains drugs that cause an abortion. Rudaba expresses her anger towards him. Feeling guilty, he regrets his decision and starts loving her but is reticent to express his love.

Due to corruption, a raid is carried out on his house, but Bashar flees just in time. Meanwhile, Rudaba, who is angry at Bashar, stays at home. In a TV conference, Tayyaba says that Bashar is corrupt and causes trouble for her. In contrast, Rudaba says that she loves her husband and does not believe in Buland's rallies that she has been forced to marry him rather than marrying for love. Bashar's unexpressed love for Rudaba is strengthened and he surrenders. For political reasons and his influential power he is spared punishment. He returns home to express his love to her and starts a new life with her. Tayyaba's son is born and Buland comes to live with her, after which Bashar tells him of his relationship with Rudaba, apologies to him and advises him to live happily with what he has.

Bashar takes Rudaba to his father's grave and decides to be a good person and leave behind all of his illegal business and start a new life with her. He leaves his ring with the BM stamp on the grave and they live their life happily.

== Episodes ==
Series	Episodes	Direction	Writer	Channel	Lead Cast	Originally released	
Series	Episodes	Direction	Writer	Channel	Lead Cast	First released	Last released
1	32	Syed Ali Raza Usama	Zanjabeel Asim	Geo TV	Faisal Qureshi; Sami Khan; Mazhar Yasir; Ushna Shah; Sundas Tariq; Mahin Rizvi	14 March 2014	8 November 2014

== Cast and characters ==
- Faysal Quraishi as Bashar Momin

Bashar is a rich, money laundering businessman who is involved in corruption. He loves his two sisters and does anything for them. Rudaba's Husband

- Ushna Shah as Rudaba:

Adil's younger sister, whose brother is married to Sahira, Bashar's sister. Rudaba is initially engaged to her father's best friend's son, but circumstances change when her father is murdered during a robbery. Bashar's wife

- Sami Khan as Buland Bakhtyar:

Originally engaged to Rudaba but later marries Bashar's younger sister, Tayyaba.

- Maheen Rizvi as Sahira Momin:

Sahira is the elder sister of Bashar and is the wife of Adil, brother of Rudaba. She is very loudmouthed and cunning. Being in the shadow of Bashar, she boasts about her wealth and tries to create trouble between her husband and his sister.

- Jinaan Hussain as Tayyaba Momin:

Tayyaba is the younger sister of Bashar and is very rude and proud. Her two engagements are ruined by her brother's shady business affairs. Bashar fulfills each of Tayyaba's demands. He forces Buland to marry Tayyaba on the request of his sister, otherwise, Rudaba has to face the consequences of his negative response.

- Yasir Mazhar as Adil Qureshi:

Yasir is the elder brother of Rudaba and husband of Bashar's elder sister, Sahira. Adil is a henpecked husband and favors Bashar in every matter until he is forced to stand up against Bashar for the sake of Rudaba's love.

- Mariyam Khalif as Pareezah Qureshi:

She is the only child of Adil and Sahiraa and is very much attached to Rudaba.

- Anwar Iqbal as Bakhtiyar:

Father of Buland Bakhtiyar and ex father-in-law of Rudaba, who dies in a robbery.

- Shehryar Zaidi as Qureshi:

Father of Rudaba and ex-father-in-law of Buland, who dies in a robbery along with Buland's father.

=== Guest appearances ===
The following are the actors who appear as a cameo/guest in the series, which is separately acknowledged and credited by production department and head:

- Noman Ejaz as Zafar
- Hina Rizvi as Zafar's wife
- Zeba Shehnaz as Bashar's Tai
- Hina Khawaja Bayat as Bashar's mother
- Shehzad Raza as Momin, Bashar's Father
- Naveed Raza as Tayyaba's ex-fiancée
- Salahuddin Tunio as Politician
- Saife Hassan as Politician

Additional roles are portrayed by Ikram Abbasi Khwaja Saleem, Fazal, Farah Zeba, Mehmood Jaffery, Nighat Naz, Muhammad Irfan, Shahid Ali, Faras, Kamaal Rizvi, Shakeel Peerzada, Wajahaat, Zawaar Khan and Shahzaib.

== Production ==
Bashar Momin is produced by A&B Entertainment. The story was written by Zanjabeel Asim and directed by Syed Ali Raza. The director of photography is Syed Adnan Bukhari, the associate director is Tahseen Khan, and the production designer is Tehmina Lodhi. It aired in India on Zindagi under the title Aks.

== Theme song and music ==
Soundtrack album by Various Artists
- Released: 8 March 2012
- Recorded: 2012
- Genres: Theme song, soundtrack
- Length: 4:15
- Language: Urdu
- Director: Syed Ali Raza Usama
- Producer: A&B Productions

The theme song of Bashar Momin was composed by Waqar Ali, and the background music was written by Mohsin Allah Ditta and edited by Faizan Ghori. All songs were produced by Asif Raza Mir and Babar Javed by A and B Entertainment. The song is sung by the talented Nida Arab & Abu Muhammad. The lyrics were penned by Ali Moin. Bashar Momin compromises a total of four songs, including its theme song. All the album credits are separately mentioned and credited by the series management. The music tracks received favourable reviews and received critical acclaim due to the different arrangements of the music sections. Except for theme song of the serial, all of the other music tracks are sung by various artists. The music was composed by Sherry Raza, Zaki, Shahbaz, Raheel, Asim and Saqib, lyrics penned by S.K Khalish, Sherry and Amir Khusro, and sung by Sherry, Raza, Asim, and Saqib, Ali Taji.

=== Track listing ===
The following is the listing of complete soundtracks, including the theme and the serial's music. Waqar Ali and Mohsin Allah Ditta serve as head music technicians for all the music tracks in the serial.

Theme Song
No.	Title	Lyrics	Music	Artist(s)	Length
1.	"Mann Moji" (Original serial theme song.)	Ali Moin	Waqar Ali	Nida Arab and Abu Muhammad	5:36

Soundtrack
No.	Title	Lyrics	Music	Artist(s)	Length
2.	"Basant Aye Ray" (soundtrack used in serial)	Sherry Raza	Sherry Raza & Zaki	Sherry Raza	1:23
3.	"Tu Hi Tu Sapna Hai Mera"	S.K Khalish	Shahbaz Raza and Raheel Nizami	Kashif Ali	0:44
4.	"Chaap Tilak"	Amir Khusrau	Saqib and Asim Ali Taji	Saqib and Asim Ali Taji	1:05
Total length:					4:15

== Nomination ==
- 14th Lux Style Awards - Best Television Actor - Faysal Qureshi (Nominated)

== See also ==
- List of Pakistani actresses
- List of Pakistani actors
- List of Pakistani television serials
