= Gustakh =

Pakistani television drama

- Genre: Romance; Drama
- Written by: Saima Akram Chudhery
- Directed by: Najaf Bilgrami
- Starring: Faysal Quraishi; Yashma Gill; Faryal Mehmood; Jinaan Hussain; Muhammad Faizan Sheikh
- Theme music composer: Ayaz Sheikh
- Composer: Syed Adeel Ali
- Country of origin: Pakistan
- Original language: Urdu
- No. of episodes: 29

Production
- Producer: Aijaz Aslam
- Running time: approx. 38–40 minutes
- Production companies: Ice Media & Entertainment

Original release
- Network: Express Entertainment
- Release: 9 July 2020 – 22 January 2021

Gustakh (Urdu: گستاخ, lit. 'Impudent'), previously titled Shaam Se Pehlay, is a Pakistani television drama serial produced under the banner of Aijaz Aslam's production house, Ice Media & Entertainment. It is written by Saima Akram Chudhery and directed by Najaf Bilgrami. It stars Faysal Quraishi, Yashma Gill, Faryal Mehmood, Jinaan Hussain, and Muhammad Faizan Sheikh. The series aired on Express Entertainment from 9 July 2020 to 22 January 2021.

== Cast ==
- Faysal Quraishi as Rohail
- Yashma Gill as Aaniya
- Faryal Mehmood as Muntaha
- Jinaan Hussain as Arisa
- Muhammad Faizan Sheikh as Shahmeer
- Ali Ansari as Emaad
- Mariam Mirza as Gulnaz
- Gul-e-Rana as Iffat
- Jahanara Hai as Jalil's mother
- Tanveer Jamal as Jalil
- Tariq Jameel

== Soundtrack ==
Gustakh OST: Dil Be Parwa

Soundtrack album by: Fabiha Hashmi; Ayaz Sheikh
