= Muskurati Morning =

- Also known as: She's on One with Faysal Qureshi
- مسکراتی مارننگ
- Genre: Morning Show; Breakfast Television
- Presented by: Faysal Qureshi & Ayesha Khalid
- Country of origin: Pakistan
- Original language: Urdu
- No. of seasons: 3
- No. of episodes: 317

Production
- Production locations: Karachi, Pakistan

Original release
- Network: TVOne Global
- Release: November 2010 – 30 September 2014

Muskurati Morning is a TV show hosted by Faysal Qureshi and Ayesha Khalid. It seeks to entertain, educate and expresses the voice of Pakistani woman.

== Synopsis ==
The show discusses health issues, fitness advice, legal problems and relationship hiccups. Herbalist Abdul Ghaffar Agha offers tips and possible cures, dermatologist Dr. Khurram Shahzad discusses skin care and beautician Gul-e-Rana offers personal aesthetic advice.

The Kismat Connection segment shows couples discussing their lives. Pop Korn discusses movies and celebrity gossip. Silver Screen discusses Pakistani cinema. Be My Guest discusses celebrities. Public Opinion allows viewers to ask questions of experts or request a makeover.
