= Sangdil (TV series) =

Pakistani television series

- Genre: Family drama Romantic drama
- Created by: Asif Raza Mir; Babar Javed
- Written by: Sadia Akhtar
- Directed by: Asad Jabal
- Starring: Kiran Haq; Naeem Haq; Ghana Ali
- Country of origin: Pakistan
- Original language: Urdu
- No. of episodes: 77

Production
- Producers: Asif Raza Mir; Babar Javed
- Camera setup: Multi-camera setup
- Running time: 15-40 minutes
- Production company: A&B Productions

Original release
- Network: Geo Entertainment
- Release: 29 February – 23 September 2016

Sangdil is a Pakistani television family drama serial that first aired on Geo Entertainment on 29 February 2016. It is produced by Asif Raza Mir and Babar Javed under their production banner A&B Productions. It features Kiran Haq, Naeem Haq and Ghana Ali in pivotal roles.

== Cast ==
- Kiran Haq as Sofia
- Ghana Ali as Zoobia
- Naeem Haq as Zohaib
- Qaiser Khan Nizamani as Touseef
- Nazlin Soomro as Farkhanda
- Hammad Farooqui as Shahzaib
- Hajra Khan as Suhaina
- Qurat-ul-Ain as Sonia
- Nazli Nasr as Farkhanda
- Mehak Ali
- Danial Afzal Khan
- Gul-e-Rana
- Faisal Naqvi
- Saqlain Bashr
- Parveen Soomro
- Shahzaib Ali Khwaja
- Danish Wakeel

== Production ==
=== Release ===
The show aired twice a week, releasing an hour episode, every Monday & Tuesday at 10:00 PM on Geo Entertainment. From 15 August, runtime of each episode was reduced to half an hour, and the frequency increased to five episodes a week as the drama soap Maikay Ki Yaad Na Aaye started airing at 10:30 PM.
