= Dukhtar =

2014 film by Afia Nathaniel

- Theatrical release poster
- دختر
- Directed by: Afia Nathaniel
- Written by: Afia Nathaniel
- Produced by: Afia Nathaniel; Muhammad Khalid Ali
- Starring: Samiya Mumtaz; Mohib Mirza; Adnan Shah Tipu; Saleha Aref; Asif Khan; Ajab Gul; Samina Ahmad
- Cinematography: Armughan Hassan; Najaf Bilgrami
- Edited by: Armughan Hassan; Afia Nathaniel
- Music by: Sahir Ali Bagga; Peter Nashel
- Production companies: Zambeel Films; The Crew Films
- Distributed by: Geo Films
- Release dates: 5 September 2014 (TIFF); 18 September 2014 (Pakistan)
- Running time: 93 minutes
- Country: Pakistan
- Languages: Urdu; Pashto
- Budget: Rs. 6.5 million (US$23,000)
- Box office: Rs. 1.65 crore (US$59,000)

Dukhtar (Urdu: دختر; transl. Daughter) is a 2014 Pakistani drama thriller film directed by Afia Nathaniel. The film stars Samiya Mumtaz, Mohib Mirza, Saleha Aref, Asif Khan, Ajab Gul and Samina Ahmad. The film is Nathaniel's feature directorial debut; she also wrote and produced the film. It is the story of a mother and her ten-year-old daughter, who leave their home to save the girl from an arranged marriage to a tribal leader.

The film was premiered at the 2014 Toronto International Film Festival on 5 September 2014. Geo Films released the film in Pakistan on 18 September 2014. It was selected as Pakistan's official entry in the category Best Foreign Language Film for the 87th Academy Awards, but was not nominated. It became Pakistan's second consecutive submission to the Oscars and was accepted after Zinda Bhaag in the same category.

== Plot ==
At the age of fifteen, Allah Rakhi (Samiya Mumtaz) was given in marriage to the much older tribal chieftain Daulat Khan (Asif Khan), who took her from her family in Lahore to live with him in the mountains. Now, two decades later, Dawlat Khan is presented with the opportunity to make peace with rival tribe leader Tor Gul (Abdullah Jaan), and the deal is to be sealed by a deal for Tor Gul's marriage to Daulat Khan's ten-year-old daughter Zainab (Saleha Aref). Tormented at the prospect that her daughter's life might be a repetition of her own, Allah Rakhi flees with the oblivious young girl in tow. Pursued by Daulat Khan and Tor Gul's henchmen, and knowing that she is highly conspicuous as an unaccompanied woman on a mountain road, Allah Rakhi sneaks on board a truck. When discovered she manages to get a lift for her and Zainab by initially lying to a sympathetic truck driver, Sohail (Mohib Mirza). When Sohail learns of the real reason for Allah Rakhi's flight, he is forced to decide whether he will endanger his own life to deliver mother and daughter to safety in Lahore.

== Cast ==
- Samiya Mumtaz as Allah Rakhi
- Mohib Mirza as Sohail
- Saleha Aref as Zainab
- Asif Khan as Daulat Khan
- Ajab Gul as Shehbaz Khan
- Samina Ahmad as Rukhsana
- Adnan Shah as Ghorzang Khan
- Abdullah Jaan as Tor Gul / Hikmatullah
- Omair Rana as Zarak Khan
- Mahira Khan/Ayesha Omer as AYEZA Worker of unicef

== Production ==
On 24 June 2014, it was announced that Geo Films had acquired the domestic distribution rights to the film. Norway's Sorfund provided the funds for the film after years of seeking funds, on which director said,

"Our local film industry is in shambles and financiers want to see Masala films with women wearing almost nothing dancing and gyrating on the screen."

The film was shot entirely in Gilgit–Baltistan northern areas, included locations Skardu, Hunza, Gilgit, Ghizer and Kallar Kahar.

== Marketing ==
On 26 June 2014, a teaser trailer was released on Vimeo by Zambeel Films.

== Release ==
Dukhtar was premiered at the 2014 Toronto International Film Festival in Discovery section on 5 September 2014. Director Afia Nathaniel said,

"It's a great honour for a Pakistani film to be selected for Toronto. We hope audiences all over the world get to enjoy this beautiful film with a beautiful heart. It will make you laugh, it will make you cry. It will make you sit on the edge of the seat until the very last scene of the film. I am so looking forward to bringing Dukhtar home right after Toronto,"

The film was previously slated for 14 August 2014 release, but later Geo Films shifted the film's date back and released domestically on 18 September 2014 in 9 major cities i.e. Karachi, Lahore, Islamabad, Rawalpindi, Multan, Hyderabad, Faisalabad, Gujranwala and Sialkot.

In October, Dukhtar was premiered in Busan Film Festival (South Korea), London Film Festival (European premiere), Films from the South (Scandinavian premiere) and São Paulo International Film Festival (Latin American premiere).

Mara Pictures, a distributor of South Asian cinema in the United Kingdom, acquired the British distribution rights to the film and released it in British cinemas in April 2015. It was also screened at the first-ever Pakistan Film Festival in New York City, held from December 3–4, 2016, at the Asia Society.

== Reception ==
=== Critical response ===
The film received positive reviews from all over the world.

On the review aggregator website Rotten Tomatoes, 93% of 15 critics' reviews are positive, with an average rating of 7.3/10/10. Deborah Young of The Hollywood Reporter reviewed the film glowingly, "The story has all the makings of a great against-all-odds adventure tale, abetted by spectacular location shooting and an outcome that is never a foregone conclusion...Afia Nathaniel's feature directing debut generates enough tension to fuel a harrowing real-life story while adding another unforgettable heroine to cinema from the region with Samiya Mumtaz's measured portrayal of a Muslim woman taking charge of her life."

Theodora Munroe of The Upcoming gave it five stars and said, "Well-acted and beautifully written, Dukhtar thrills and stirs."

Writer Mohsin Hamid said, "Dukhtar is a wonderful, impressive film. It shows how quickly Pakistani cinema is progressing." Samina Peerzada said of young actress Saleha Aref, "The little girl in Dukhtar – a star is born." Academy award winner director Sharmeen Obaid-Chinoy said, "Dukhtar has set a new precedent in filmmaking in Pakistan. The film's powerful narrative is met with equally strong visuals that collectively showcase what Pakistani talent is all about. I have no doubt that the story will resonate with people locally and internationally." Actress Meesha Shafi praised the film, actress and director, "Simple yet full of impact. Dukhtar highlights a subject that desperately needs attention. Sensitive yet spirited portrayal of Allah Rakkhi by Samia Mumtaz. The Pakistani landscape is shot with a beautiful eye. Afia Nathanial has arrived." Film producer Iram Parveen Bilal said, "Dukhtar is a story told with visually striking images, sensitive characters and most importantly, with a heart. I wish it all my best for its Oscar submission."

Maliha Rehman reviewed the film for "Dawn" newspaper, "Dukhtar or 'daughter' has a title that is self-explanatory to a large extent...What the title does not relay, though, are the subtle nuances that flow through the storyline, the direction that seamlessly traverses the breathtaking landscape of Northern Pakistan all the way down to urban Lahore and the acting that holds it all together. All this, coupled with a heartrending storyline, makes Dukhtar well worth the watch." She also said, "As a harbinger to the much-touted 'Revival of Pakistani Cinema', Dukhtar highlights the strengths of the industry. A strong plot, coupled with fabulous music, some very good actors and watertight direction – Dukhtar has no allusions towards Bollywood or Hollywood and it doesn't need to. With its highs and few lows, its stronger elements and faults, it's a completely Pakistani story, told from a completely Pakistani perspective; a story well-told."

Nicholas Bell of Ion Cinema reviewed the film, "Samiya Mumtaz manages to be rather mesmerizing as a soft-spoken wife that surprises herself with her own survival skills."

Dushka H Saiyid reviewed the film for Youlin Magazine, "From a country that is being swept by floods, and pushed towards anarchy, comes an indie film called Dukhtar, showcased at the International Toronto Film Festival. Making her debut with this creative offering, Afia Nathaniel has written, directed and produced Dukhtar. Like some of its recent predecessors, Khuda Kay Liye, Bol and Zinda Bhaag, it deals with a social issue. The underlying theme of this film is swara, a custom practiced in Pakistan's northern areas, where a girl child is given away in marriage to settle a blood feud between families or tribes."

Salman Junejo reviewed the film for his The Express Tribune blog, "Rarely do movies of such calibre come along that transcend generations and provoke our greater thought process, not because of impressive visuals, A-list actors, extravagant set pieces and locales but because of its strong story-driven narrative – narrative that is deeply entrenched into the harsh realities of life, as opposed to a work of fiction." J Hurtado said that the film "finds peace and passion in the plight of the downtrodden in this remote part of the world. To reward that passion with attention and acknowledgement is the least we can do. Highly recommended."

== Accolades ==
On 18 September the Pakistani Academy Selection committee selected Dukhtar for the Oscar consideration at 87th Academy Awards in the category Best Foreign Language Film. Nominees will be chosen on 8 January 2015, and the final list will be announced on 15 January. On being chosen as Pakistan's entry for the Academy Awards, director Nathaniel said,

"It's so overwhelming to hear about this news right after our world premiere at Toronto and during our theatrical release in Pakistan. My deep gratitude to the Pakistan Academy Selection Committee for their support and for our audiences everywhere who have embraced us so warmly."

Dukhtar was screened at the 11th South Asian International Film Festival (SAIFF) on 22 November, won two awards at the festival, Best Director and Audience Award for Best Feature.

The film won Jury Special Award for Asian Cinema at Bengaluru International Film Festival.

Ceremony	Won	Nominated
87th Academy Awards	Submitted as Pakistan's entry for Best Foreign Language Film	Not nominated
11th South Asian International Film Festival (SAIFF)	Afia Nathaniel – Best Director; Audience Award for Best Feature	
7th Bengaluru International Film Festival	Jury Special Award for Asian Cinema	
14th Lux Style Awards	Saleha Arif – Best Actress	Best Film – Dukhtar; Afia Nathaniel – Best Director; Samiya Mumtaz – Best Actress; Muhammad Khalid Ali & Afia Nathaniel – Best Original Soundtrack

== See also ==
- List of highest-grossing Pakistani films
- List of Pakistani films of 2014
- List of submissions to the 87th Academy Awards for Best Foreign Language Film
- List of Pakistani submissions for the Academy Award for Best International Feature Film
