= Yaariyan (2010 TV series) =

- Genre: Family
- Created by: A&B Entertainment
- Written by: Sameena Ejaz
- Starring: Samiya Mumtaz; Faisal Qureshi; Aijaz Aslam; Asif Raza Mir; Sadia Khan
- Country of origin: Pakistan

Production
- Producers: Asif Raza Mir; Babar Javed
- Running time: 45–50 minutes (per episode)
- Production company: A&B Entertainment

Original release
- Network: Geo TV
- Release: 14 June 2010 – 6 December 2010

Yaariyan is a Pakistani drama serial directed by Babar Javed and produced by A & B Productions. Retitled as Bhula Diya, it also aired in India on Zindagi. The story revolves around three friends: Babar, Shah-Jahan and Rida, played by Faisal Qureshi, Aijaz Aslam and Samiya Mumtaz, respectively.

== Synopsis ==
Yaariyan is a story about three friends and the twists and turns that life throws at them. Rida, Jahan and Babar are the best of friends. The fact that they come from three completely different backgrounds only serves to bring them closer together and complement each other in every aspect of life.

Jahan is a wealthy young man who loves to party and live life to the fullest. His biggest weakness is having a soft spot for the ladies and always having a new girl by his side.

However, although Jahan may seem all bright and bubbly on the surface, he does have a cross to bear. Jahan's parents' split up when he was young, and he now lives with his father and step-mother. His relationship with them is far from perfect, as his father is hardly ever at home, while he can't stand his step-mother. This leaves Jahan feeling unwanted and looking to his friends for support, his closest ally being Babar.

Babar is a hardworking guy who has his feet firmly on the ground. After having been scarred for life during his childhood, because his mother left his father due to financial issues, Babar has deep psychological problems. For him, his friends are his only family and people he can rely on through thick and thin.

Rida meanwhile is a self–made young girl who has worked her way through college with a lot of dignity and self-respect. For Rida, life is all about living from the heart, and taking decisions on impulse rather than thinking them through logically. A trait her friends sometimes find it very hard to deal with.

'Yariyan' is the story of how Jahan, Rida and Babar's friendship is tested as they go through life. Whether it's Rida's decision to marry an HIV patient; Jahan's decision to let Babar look after his newly inherited family business; or the love of Babar's life, who soon catches Jahan's eye and becomes the reason he reforms himself; life's twists and turns make all three friends question their friendship more than once.

A story full of lies, deceit, conspiracy, intrigue and how they all, at some point, come in the way of a deep and beautiful friendship.

== Cast ==
- Samiya Mumtaz
- Faisal Qureshi
- Aijaz Aslam
- Asif Raza Mir
- Sadia Khan
- Khayyam Sarhadi
- Rubina Ashraf
