= Aashti =

Pakistani television series

- Title screen
- Genre: Romance; Family drama
- Written by: Seema Ghazal
- Directed by: Adnan Wai Qureshi
- Starring: Resham; Faisal Qureshi; Humayun Saeed; Madiha Iftikhar; Sajid Hasan; Fahad Mustafa
- Country of origin: Pakistan
- Original language: Urdu
- No. of episodes: 27

Production
- Producer: Mehroz Karim
- Production locations: Karachi, Pakistan
- Running time: 45 minutes

Original release
- Network: Hum TV
- Release: 22 March – 27 September 2009

Aashti (Urdu: آشتى) is a Pakistani drama television series that was aired on Hum TV. The producer is Mehroz Karim; it is written by Seema Ghazal and directed by Adnan Wai Qureshi. Aashti depicts the lives of Bengalis settled in Pakistan, showcasing their lifestyle.

== Plot ==
Aashti is a Bengali girl from an underprivileged family of Karachi, working as a maid for a wealthy family of Ali Alam. Despite being engaged to Nazr-ul-Islam, Aashti has secret feelings for the Ali Alam's son, Abrash, who supports her dreams and encourages her to pursue education.

However, Aashti's world is turned upside down when she discovers Abrash's impending marriage to Zarnish. After his marriage, their relationship faces challenges and Zarnish departs for London, with Abrash following close behind to resolve their issues once and for all.

Due to some circumstances, Aashti also travels to London, where Abrash's father Ali Alam, also arrives who complicates the matter further.

== Cast ==
- Resham as Aashti
- Faysal Quraishi as Nazar ul Islam
- Humayun Saeed as Abrash
- Sajid Hasan as Ali Alam; Abrash's father
- Seemi Pasha as Sherry; Abrash's mother
- Angeline Malik as Zarnish; Abrash's father
- Madiha Iftikhar as Aqeela; Saeed's wife
- Fahad Mustafa as Saeed ul Islam; Aqeela's husband
- Salma Zafar as Zamani, Nazar and Saeed's mother
- Parveen Akbar as Jameela, Aashti's mother
- Sohail Asghar as Aashti's father
- Waqar Kayani as Saeed and Nazar's father
- Rashid Farooqui
- Farah Nadir as Khala

== Production ==
Mustafa describes the role as his "filthiest role and also the best experience of his career". Playing Saeed ul Islam, a Karachi-based Bengali poor worker, he became deeply immersed in the character, often adopting Bangla undertones in his speech even after filming.

== Reception ==
=== Critical reception ===
In a review by Herald, the reviewer praised the series for its authentic portrayal of Bengali culture and attention to detail, but criticizes the script for relying on clichés and unnecessary plot complications.

=== Accolades ===
Year	Award	Category	Recipient(s) / nominee(s)	Result	Ref.
2010	Lux Style Awards	Best Television Play - Satellite	Aashti	Nominated	
2010	Lux Style Awards	Best Television Writer	Seema Ghazal	Nominated	
2010	Lux Style Awards	Best Television Director	Adnan Wai Qureshi	Nominated	
2010	Lux Style Awards	Best Television Actress - Satellite	Resham	Nominated	

== See also ==
- Noorpur Ki Rani
- Mannchalay
- Manay Na Ye Dil
- Malaal
