= Pathjar Ke Baad =

Pakistani television series

- Title screen
- Genre: Drama
- Written by: Maha Malik
- Directed by: Adnan Wai Qureshi
- Country of origin: Pakistan
- Original language: Urdu

Production
- Producer: Mehroz Karim
- Production locations: Karachi, Sindh
- Running time: 40 min
- Production company: Mehroz Karim Films

Original release
- Network: Urdu 1
- Release: 2012

Pathjar Ka Baad (Urdu: پت جھڑ کے بعد, lit. 'After Autumn') is a Pakistani television series aired on Urdu 1. It stars Samiya Mumtaz, Noman Ijaz and Adnan Siddiqui in pivot roles.

== Plot ==
It is a story of an unlucky girl Hadiya, who was unknowingly married to a mentally ill man, Zariyab. Zariyab is an unlucky son of a billionaire, who always kept his mental illness secret and after arranging his marriage with Hadiya, they spread the news that she is a depression patient. They even called a renowned psychiatrist, Shah Mir, to treat her. But fate had other plans as Shah Mir turned out to be her ex-lover and college mate. He gradually came to know that Hadiya has been trapped but this time he helped Hadiya by treating Zariyab's illness but no therapy or medication worked on him. During the process, Hadiya once again fell for Shah Mir and Zariyab's family finally realized their mistake which was later put right with her divorce from Zariyab.

== Cast ==
- Noman Ejaz
- Adnan Siddiqui
- Samia Mumtaz
- Shakeel
- Saba Faisal
- Rehan Sheikh
- Sabreen Hisbani
- Angeline Malik
