= Kis Din Mera Viyah Howay Ga =

- کس دن میرا ویاہ ہووے گا
- Genre: Comedy; Romance; Drama
- Developed by: Rizwan Siddique; Faysal Manzoor Khan
- Written by: Samra Bukhari; Kazim Zaidi; Asad Bukhari; Tabsir Nishat
- Directed by: Iftikhar Iffi; Danish Nawaz; Faisal Mehmood Khan
- Opening theme: Kis Din Mera Viyah Howay Ga
- Composer: Mohsin Javed's Kaliyan Composers
- Country of origin: Pakistan
- Original languages: Urdu; Punjabi
- No. of seasons: 4
- No. of episodes: 135

Production
- Producers: Asif Raza Mir; Babar Javed
- Cinematography: Raheel Mirza
- Editor: Muhammad Ashraf
- Camera setup: Multi
- Running time: 45–50 minutes
- Production companies: A&B Production

Original release
- Network: Geo Entertainment
- Release: 2 August 2011 – June 18, 2018

Kis Din mera Viyah Howay Ga (meaning, "When will I get married?") is a Pakistani sitcom series first aired on Geo TV in August 2011. The series was first directed by Muhammad Iftikhar Iffi and starred Faisal Qureshi, Aijaz Aslam, Jana Malik, and Sangeeta. The plot revolves around the Chaudhary family who live in a mansion together in a small village near Lahore, Pakistan. Much of the humor centers around the character Sheeda who disguises himself as a girl named Sheedo to hide from his former gang members, and to protect himself from being arrested. The final episode of season one of Kis Din Mera Viyah Howay Ga aired on 15 September 2011, and returned for a second season in late July 2012. The second season ended on 23 August 2012, after a decline in viewership, but it was renewed and the third season started on 11 July 2013.

It first aired on 2 August 2011, and had 4 seasons before ending on 18 June 2018. The OST was composed by Mohsin Javed. Each season consisted of 35–40 hour-long episodes, and aired at 8:00 pm from Monday to Thursday. Kis Din Mera Viyah Howay Ga aired every Ramadan and was among the top prime-time, weekday dramas in Pakistan. The show was aired on weekdays and aired for an hour, when first season ended, second season came out next year with some new cast members and few new different crew members this season also aired on same time slot. After a year third Season came out and this one also ran on same bases with some changed casting members. The fourth season was released in 2018.

== Premise ==
The series is set in a village in Lahore, Pakistan. The main characters are Chaudhary Nazakat, Bilo, and Shehzadi are family members living in a large house with their maid Pino. A gang of burglars convinces the teenager, Sheeda, to join their gang because he looks similar to their dead boss, Jabar Khan. After accepting a bribe, Sheeda has second thoughts when he learns the police are searching for Jabar Khan. In order to hide, he disguises himself as a girl named Sheedo. When Sheedo enters the Mansion, he unwittingly causes his best friend Nazakat fall for him.

== Cast and characters ==
Character	Portrayed By			
Character	Season 1	Season 2	Season 3	Season 4
Chaudhry Nazakat/ Don	Aijaz Aslam	Aijaz Aslam	Aijaz Aslam	Aijaz Aslam
Sheeda/Sheedo/Jabar Khan/ Aunty Shades/Shamso Goshwara	Faysal Qureshi	Faysal Qureshi	Faysal Qureshi	Faysal Qureshi
Chaudhry Karamat	Hashim Butt	Hashim Butt	Hashim Butt	Hashim Butt
Zubaida Begum/Chuadraein	Sangeeta	Sangeeta	Sangeeta	Sangeeta
Inspector Saleem	Adnan Shah Tipu	Adnan Shah Tipu	Adnan Shah Tipu	Adnan Shah Tipu
Pinno	Aiman Tariq	N/A	N/A	N/A
Billo	Jana Malik	N/A	N/A	N/A
Shehzadi	Sadia Ghaffar	N/A	N/A	N/A
Razia	Ghazal Javed	N/A	N/A	N/A
Nawab Sahab	Ali Rizvi	N/A	N/A	N/A
Kami	Saqib Sumeer	N/A	N/A	N/A
Taefee	Syed Fazal Hussain	N/A	N/A	N/A
Peer Sahab	Rashid Farooqui	N/A	N/A	N/A
Munawwara	Noshaba Javed	N/A	N/A	N/A
Saira	N/A	Arij Fatyma	N/A	N/A
Naik Parveen	N/A	Sumbul Iqbal	N/A	N/A
Sawera	N/A	Sana Askari	N/A	N/A
Dolly	N/A	Ayesha Gul	N/A	N/A
Laila	N/A	N/A	Yasra Rizvi	N/A
Millie	N/A	N/A	Nimra Khan	N/A
Cheeno	N/A	N/A	Sana Fakhar	N/A
Pinky	N/A	N/A	Eshita Syed	N/A
Safina	N/A	N/A	Maheen Rizvi	N/A
Maseedo	N/A	N/A	N/A	Fakhr-e-Alam
Hania	N/A	N/A	N/A	Ghana Ali
Tania	N/A	N/A	N/A	Yashma Gill
Bhateeja	N/A	N/A	N/A	Shafaat Ali
Subaqtageen	N/A	N/A	N/A	Ayaz Ahmed
Shehnaaz Phupho	N/A	N/A	N/A	Sophiya Ahmed
DIG Ejaz	N/A	N/A	N/A	Salahuddin Tunio
Gulabo	N/A	N/A	N/A	Asma Saif
Masooma	N/A	N/A	N/A	Sharmeen Ali
Chaudhry Takat	N/A	N/A	N/A	Ali Salman
Hameeda	N/A	N/A	N/A	Humaira Zahid
Wata	N/A	N/A	N/A	Faysal Mehmood Khan
Sata	N/A	N/A	N/A	Wajhi Farooqi

=== Guest appearance ===
==== Season 1 ====
- Sami Khan as Anwar
- Noman Habib as Feekay
- Seemi Pasha as Maasi Khaira
- Hira Shaikh as Noori

== Series overview ==
Season	No. of episodes	Originally broadcast (Pakistan)	
Season	No. of episodes	First episode	Last episode
1	20	2 August 2011	15 September 2011
2	36	19 July 2012	23 August 2012
3	35	11 July 2013	14 August 2013
4	31	17 May 2018	18 June 2018

=== Season 1 ===
Kis Din Mera Viyah Howay Ga season 1 was aired in Ramadan 2011 from 2 August and went off air on 15 September after 20 episodes. It was written by Samra Bukhari. It aired Monday to Thursday at 9:00 P.M. This season starred Aijaz Aslam, Faisal Qureshi, Jana Malik, Aiman Tariq, Sangeeta, Sadia Ghaffar, and Hashim Butt.

=== Season 2 ===
After the success of season 1, it came back with season 2 which on aired in Ramadan 2012 from 19 July to 23 August. It was written by Kazim Zaidi. This season had some changes in cast of the play. It stars Qavi Khan as Mirza Sahab, Gul e Rana as Sahibaan, Faysal Qureshi as Sheda/Jabir Khan/Aunty Shades, Aijaz Aslam as Choudry Nazakat, Sumbul Iqbal as Naik Perveen, Sana Askari as Sawera, Arij Fatima as Mooni, Tipu Shah as Inspector Saleem, Yasira Rizvi as Laila, Ayesha Gul as Dolli, Shakeel Siddiki as DON 2. This season ends after 36 episodes and got better ratings.

=== Season 3 ===
In 2013, it come back on 11 July and went off air on 14 August after 35 episodes. This season was written by Asad Bukhari. Lead cast was same but few new characters were also introduced like Sana Fakhar, Eshita Syed, Maheen Rizvi, Sara Omair, Nimra Khan, and Taifoor Khan. This season declined in viewership, therefore its end came soon after Season 4 was started.

=== Weekend special ===
According to pattern KDMVHG on air every Ramadan once in year but after end of Season 3 in August, from 15 September 2013 it started on air weekly on Sunday but didn't gain TRPs due to decline in viewership and off air on 3 November after 13 episodes. This season was directed by Danish Nawaz while Neelam Muneer, Naved Raza, Erfan Motiwala and others were also added in the cast along with Aijaz and Faisal.

=== Season 4 ===
After gap of 5 years, KDMVHG is back with season 04. This time it is about the sister of Sheedo, Maseedo portrayed by Fakhar-e-Alam. The other names of cast include: Ghana Ali, Yashma Gill, Naveed Raza, Shafaat Ali, Sofia Ahmed and others. It premiered from 17 May 2018.

== 11th Lux Style Awards ==
- Best TV Play (Satellite)-Nominated

== Indian adaption ==
An Indian adaption of sitcom with same titled premiered on Zee Magic on 25 November 2013.
