= Syed Ali Raza Usama =

TV, film, commercial & music director

- Born: 26 May 1980 (age 46); Karachi, Pakistan
- Other name: Usama
- Occupation: Director
- Parent: Seema Ghazal
- Relatives: Shamoon Abbasi (cousin)

Syed Ali Raza Usama (Urdu: سید علی رضا اسامہ) is a Pakistani television director.

A former creative director at AAJ TV, Usama has directed acclaimed drama serials such as Bashar Momin (2014) and Khuda Aur Muhabbat (season 2) (2016-2017).

== Direction credits ==
=== Television serials ===
Year	Title	Network	Note
2011—2012	Kash Mein Teri Beti Na Hoti	Geo TV	
2014	Bashar Momin	Geo TV	
2014—2015	Sultanat-e-Dil	Geo TV	
2015	Maryam	Geo TV	
2015	Dil Ishq	Geo Entertainment	
2015—16	Teri Meri Jodi	Geo Entertainment	
2016	Khuda Aur Muhabbat (season 2)	Geo Entertainment	
2017	Tere Bina	Geo TV	
2017–18	Shayad	Geo Entertainment	
2018	Khalish	Geo Entertainment	
2018–19	Ab Dekh Khuda Kya Karta Hai	Geo Entertainment	
2019	Dil-e-Bereham	A-Plus TV	
2020	Mera Dil Mera Dushman	ARY Digital	
2020–2021	Faryaad	ARY Digital	
2021	Aakhir Kab Tak	Hum TV	
2022	Yeh Na Thi Hamari Qismat	ARY Digital	

=== Films ===
Year	Title
2013	Main Hoon Shahid Afridi
