= Ishq Junoon Deewangi =

2009 Pakistani television series

- Title screen
- Also known as: Ijaazat
- Genre: Family; Romance
- Starring: Humayun Saeed; Humaima Malick; Faisal Qureshi; Aijaz Aslam; Adnan Siddiqui
- Country of origin: Pakistan
- Original language: Urdu
- No. of episodes: 21

Production
- Production locations: Karachi, Pakistan; Mauritius, Cape Town
- Running time: 45–50 minutes
- Production company: Moomal Productions

Original release
- Network: Hum TV
- Release: 15 May – 16 October 2009

Ishq Junoon Dewangi (Urdu: عشق جنون ديوانگى, lit. 'Love, Passion, Madness') is a Pakistani drama serial that aired on Hum TV in 2009. It was written and produced by Momina Duraid and directed by Babar Javed. The 21-episode serial tells the story of a couple, where a director husband falls for the fictional character, written by his writer wife.

It was filmed in Mauritius and Cape Town. At the 9th Lux Style Awards, the series won Best TV Play and Best Actor for Saeed.

== Cast ==
- Humayun Saeed as Sahil Sher; Seep's first husband
- Deepti Gupta as Seep; Sahil's wife
- Humaima Malick as Pares Usmani; Zain's wife
- Adnan Siddiqui as Zain Khan; Pares' husband
- Pooja Kumar as Mariam; Sahil's friend
- Ismail Bashey as Behram Omar; Sahil's friend and Seep's second husband
- Faysal Qureshi as Sahil's musician
- Nadia Hussain as Zain's girlfriend
- Aijaz Aslam

== Production ==
The role of Pares was also offered to Ayesha Khan but she declined the part.

== Broadcast ==
- Ishq Junoon Deewangi originally broadcast on Hum TV from May 15 to October 16, 2009.
- It was also aired in India on Zindagi, premiering on 20 January 2015.

== Awards and nominations ==
=== 9th Lux Style Awards ===
- Best TV Play - Ishq Junoon Deewangi
- Best TV Actor - Humayun Saeed
- Best TV Director - Babar Javed - Nominated
