= Maheen Rizvi =

Pakistani television actress and model

Maheen Khalid Rizvi
- Born: Maheen Khalid Rizvi; Karachi, Sindh
- Occupation: Actress
- Years active: 2011- Present

Maheen Rizvi is a Pakistani television actress and model. She is best known for her role as Saahira in the 2013 drama serial Bashar Momin. She has also appeared in Bilqees Kaur (2011), Adhuri Aurat (2013), Zindagi Gulzar Hai (2013), Digest Writer (2015), and Iqraar (2015). For her work in Digest Writer, she was nominated in the Best Supporting Actress category at the 3rd Hum Awards.

== Career ==
In 2011, Maheen made her debut in the hit drama serial Maat. Despite her brief role, her performance made an impact on the viewers. During the same year, she bagged a supporting role in Zard Mausam and the highly acclaimed drama Bilqees Kaur where she played the role of a college student. Her Punjabi getup, body language, and dialogue delivery made an impact on the viewers. Not only did she act in Bilqees Kaur but also assisted the director during the New York spell. In 2012 she was offered the serial Adhoori Aurat which aired on Geo TV in 2013. She was appreciated for her role as a vamp and also received an award for it in 2014. It was after this particular serial that people started taking her work very seriously. In 2013, Rizvi did a TVC for Pampers which was shot in Cape Town, South Africa. Upon return, she was offered the role of an Antagonist in a Pakistani Drama Serial titled 'Bashar Momin'. The Drama became a worldwide success and her character of Saahira was acclaimed as one of the best negative roles in Pakistani Drama Industry and her style was copied by many. Maheen took an extended break at the peak of her career to raise a family and re-settled in the US in 2015. She’s indicated making a comeback once her children are older.

== Education ==
Rizvi had early schooling at St.Joseph's Convent High School and then left for the USA after completing college at DCW. She received her Bachelor's degree in Television Production and Film making from Denver, Colorado.

== Personal ==
She married American entrepreneur Rehman Saiyed on 22 December 2014. They are said to have been in a relationship since early 2014. Rizvi now resides in Baltimore with her husband and two daughters.

== Filmography ==
- Bilqees Kaur (2011)
- Maat (2011)
- Zard Mausam (2012)
- Coke Kahani (2012)
- Pehli Aandhi Mausam Ki (2012)
- Silvatein (2012)
- Adhuri Aurat (2012)
- Kis Din Mera Viyaah Season 3 (2013)
- Kalmoohi (2013)
- Bashar Momin (2013)
- Zindagi Gulzar Hai (2013)
- Digest Writer (2014)
- Nazdeekiyan (2014)
- Koi Nahi Apna (2014)
- Iqraar (2015)
- Zinda Dargor (2015)

Telefilms-

Express Telefilms - Darr

Aasha ki asha - Tv one

== Awards and nominations ==
- 4th Pakistan Media Awards: Best Emerging Talent Female - won
- 3rd Hum Awards: Best Supporting Actress - Nominated
