= Afia Nathaniel =

Pakistani filmmaker

- Born: 1974 (age 51–52); Quetta, Pakistan
- Education: Lahore University of Management Sciences; Convent of Jesus and Mary, Lahore; Kinnaird College for Women University; Columbia University School of the Arts
- Occupation: Filmmaker
- Website: afianathaniel.me

Afia Serena Nathaniel (born 1974) is an independent Pakistani filmmaker who works primarily as a writer, director, producer and editor. She is a graduate of the Film Division at the Columbia University School of the Arts (2006).

== Early life ==
Afia Nathaniel was born in Quetta, Pakistan. She is the eldest of three girls. Her father was in the Armed Forces and her mother a professor of English. Afia was brought up and educated in Lahore.

== Education ==
Afia did her Senior Cambridge from the Convent of Jesus and Mary, Lahore. She then attended Kinnaird College from 1991 to 1994, graduating with a BSc degree. She majored in Mathematics with a minor in Physics. In college, Afia participated actively in debating forums, poetry competitions and dramatics. She was elected the President of Science Club by the students at Kinnaird. Afia was awarded the prestigious Mangat Rai Gold Medal in 1994 in recognition of her outstanding academic record and extracurricular achievements.

In August 1994, Afia joined Lahore University of Management Sciences (LUMS) to pursue a BSc in Computer Science. She graduated from LUMS in 1997.

In 2001, Columbia University offered Afia Nathaniel a two-year Dean's fellowship enabling her to join their MFA Film programme. Afia won several accolades for her short films which spurred the growth of New Wave of Pakistani independent cinema.

== Early career ==
In the absence of any film schools in Pakistan, Afia Nathaniel, joined Publicis Pakistan (formerly Headstart) and began a career in advertising soon after graduating from LUMS. She was quickly promoted to head the Creative Department at Publicis Pakistan.

In 1999, Afia left Pakistan to work with the World YWCA, an international women's non-profit organisation based in Geneva, Switzerland. She attended the UN Commission on Human Rights from 1999 to 2001 and worked with women in over 100 countries in the areas of peace, justice, health, human rights and environment. Afia was appointed as the Communications Manager for the endowment campaign of the World YWCA.

== Film career ==
In 2008, Afia founded Zambeel Films, a film production company in Pakistan, specialising in producing local independent films for a global audience. Afia is a member of Film Fatales independent women filmmakers.

- Dukhtar (2014)

=== Don’t Be Late, Myra (2024) ===
Afia wrote and directed the short film Don’t Be Late, Myra, inspired by experiences from her childhood in Lahore. Shot on location in the city, the film explores themes of fear and social pressures faced by young girls. It screened internationally, winning several festival awards, and qualified for consideration at the 98th Academy Awards.

== Personal life ==
Afia is currently based in New York City. She teaches in the visual arts department at Princeton University. She lives with her husband and daughter .

== Awards ==
Film Awards/Honours/Grants

- 2015 Best Film Director – Dukhtar (awaiting result)
- 2010 NYFA Geri Ashur Screenwriting Award
- 2006 Milos Forman Finishing Fund
- 2006 Hollywood Foreign Press Association Grant
- 2005 IFP Market Screenplay Award
- 2005 Ezra Litwak Award for Distinction in Screenwriting at the Columbia University Film School Student Film Festival
- 2005 HBO Development Award
- 2005 Finalist, Tribeca Connect, New York
- 2003 Nadah, Nominee Golden Reel Award, VC Filmfest

Academic Awards/Fellowships/Grants

- 2004-6 World Studio Foundation Fellow
- 2003-4 AAUW International Fellow
- 2003-4 MMMF (James Wolfensohn) Fellow, World Bank
- 2003-4 WIL Fellow, International House, New York
- 2001-3 Dean's Fellow, School of Arts, Columbia University, New York
- 1994 Mangat Rai Gold Medal, Kinnaird College, Lahore, Pakistan

== Film festivals ==
- Nadah (Short Film) – Director, Producer, Editor
- International Film Festival Rotterdam, 2003 (World Premiere)
- Reel-World Film Festival, Toronto, 2003 (Canadian Premiere)
- Clermont-Ferrand Film Market 2003
- 19th VC FilmFest, Los Angeles, 2003 (Nominee Golden Reel Award)
- 9th International Film Festival Dortmund, Germany 2003
- Anthology Film Archive, New York, 2003
- Commonwealth International Film Festival 2003 (UK Premiere)
- 1st Asian Pacific Short-Film Festival 2003 Barcelona (Spain Premiere)
- 9th Asian Film Festival, 2003, Lyon (French Premiere)
- 3rd KaraFilmFestival, 2003, Karachi, Pakistan (Pakistan Premiere)
- Cinemasia, 2004, Netherlands
- Mateela Film Festival, 2004, Lahore, Pakistan (Lahore Premiere)

Toba Tek Singh (Short Film) – Writer, director, producer, editor, Executive Producer

- New York Asian American International film festival 2005 (World Premiere)
- VC FilmFest 2006, Los Angeles, US (American Premiere)

Long After... (Muntazir) (Short Film) – Writer, director, producer, editor, Executive Producer

- Montreal World Cinema Film Festival 2007
- ReelWorld Film Festival, Toronto, 2008
- Clermont-Ferrand Short Film Market 2008
- Asian American International Film Festival, New York, 2008
- New Jersey International Film Festival 2008

Butterfly (Short Film) – Writer

- Asia-Expo film festival, Lyon France (Winner Audience Choice Award)
- Napa Valley Wine Country Film Fest (Winner Best International Short Film)
- Black Maria Film Festival 2003 (Winner Honourable Mention)
- Ivy Film Festival 2003 (Winner best graduate student film)
- 19th VC Film Fest, LA, 2003 (Nominee Golden Reel Award)
- San Francisco International Film Festival 2003
- Mumbai International Film Festival, 2003
- Palm Springs Short Film Festival, 2003
- Hawaii International Film Festival, 2003
- Greenwich Film Festival, 2003
- Indian Film Festival of Los Angeles, 2003
- San Francisco International Asian American Film Festival, 2003
- Vancouver Asian Film Festival, 2003
- Cinema Paradiso Film Festival, 2003
- ACV New York Asian American Film Festival, 2003
- San Diego Asian Film Festival, 2003
- DC Asian Pacific American Film Festival, 2003
- Dallas Asian American Film Festival, 2003

== Awards and nominations ==
Year	Title	Award	Category	Result
2015	Dukhtar	14th Lux Style Awards	Best Director	Nominated
