= Green.tv =

Green.TV is a multi-channel video publishing network for clean tech, conservation and sustainability stories. It launched in partnership with the United Nations Environment Programme.

All content on Green.TV is available on multiple platforms including connected TVs and handheld devices. Films are typically 2 – 6 minutes long and further information and links to relevant sources are provided for each.

Green.TV has published videos in editorial channels on Apple iTunes, Aol, Huffington Post, Vewd App Store, Sony TV, Amazon Fire TV, Amazon Fire for Android, TiVo and Samsung Blu-ray.

It produces and/or distributes content for organisations in the clean tech, conservation and sustainability space. It works with organisations such as Nissan, Siemens Energy, Vestas, the RSPB, the National Trust, the World Business Council for Sustainable Development, DNV GL, the Sierra Club, Ramsar, Cisco, World Wide Fund for Nature and Greenpeace .

== History ==
- March 2006 - Green.TV Launches in partnership with the United Nations Environment Programme
- September 2006 - Green.TV establishes a formal partnership with Greenpeace International, establishing a relationship to show all Greenpeace International films on green.tv.
- November 2006 - Green.TV establishes new 'Partner channel' functionality giving organisations the ability to have their own channel within green.tv. Partner channels include UNEP, Greenpeace International, Free Range Studios, Toyota and New Consumer magazine
- January 2007 - Green.TV's podcast becomes the number one video podcast in its category on iTunes.
- April 2007 - Friends Provident sponsor Green.tv's 'People' channel. Ecover sponsor Green. TV's 'Water' channel.
- September 2007 - Green.TV was nominated for two prestigious awards: Best Website at the BEMAs (British Environment and Media Awards) and Best New Media at the Green Awards
- November 2007 - Green.TV launches its user-generated channel, YourGreen.TV, with funding from the Esmee Fairburn Foundation.
- February 2011 - Green.TV becomes an official 'Featured Provider' for iTunes with a permanent link on the Podcast homepage.
- September 2011 - Green.TV launches a series of apps for Nokia phones receiving worldwide promotion on the Nokia store
- December 2011 - Green.TV becomes an official partner with Dailymotion making all videos available to users of this platform.
- April 2012 - Green.TV becomes an official partner with AOL and launches the Green.tv branded channel on the AOL On curated video platform.
- April 2012 - Green.TV has become an official partner with TES (Times Educational Supplement) providing videos to teachers and pupils around the world.
- May 2012 - Green.TV launches on connected TVs and set-top boxes across Europe including Hitachi, Sharp and JVC (via the Netrange portal)
- October 2012 - Green.TV launches on Sony connected TVs and Blu-rays as a flagship channel alongside BBC, YouTube and LoveFilm across the UK, Europe, USA, Canada, Latin America and CIS states.
- November 2012 - Green.TV launches on Bizu.tv - the video platform of the International Business Times
- August 2013 - Green.TV launches one of the featured channels on Sony Smart TV
- September 2014 - Green.TV launches on Amazon Fire TV, Amazon Fire for Android
- October 2014 - Green.TV launches on TiVo
