= Seema Ghazal =

Pakistani writer (born 1964)

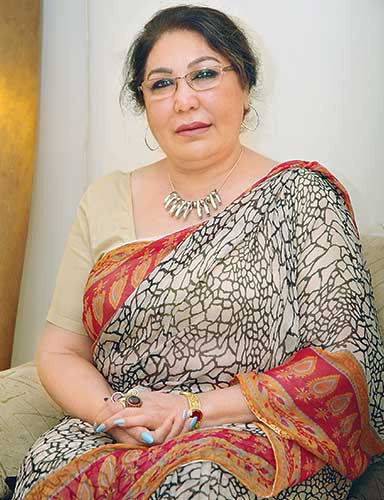
- Seema Ghazal
- Native name: سیما غزل
- Born: February 17, 1964 (age 62)

Seema Ghazal (born 17 February 1964) is an Urdu-language poet, novelist, and story and drama writer from Lahore, Punjab, Pakistan. She is best known as the writer of TV series such as Dil-e-Jaanam, Aashti, and Noor Bano.

== Filmography ==
=== Television ===
Year	Show	Role	Notes
2017	Dil-e-Jaanam	Writer	TV Serial
2009	Aashti	Writer	Television Series
2010	Noor Bano	Writer	Television Series
2016	Khoobsurat	Writer	Television Series
2016	De Ijazat Jo Tu	Writer	TV Serial
