= Ghana Ali =

Pakistani actress

Ghana Ali Raza
- غنا علی رضا
- Born: Ghana Ali Raza; 26 January 1995 (age 31); Lahore
- Occupations: Actress, model
- Years active: 2015–present

Ghana Ali Raza (Urdu: غنا علی رضا) is a Pakistani television, film and theater actress. She is known for her work in Pakistani dramas. Ali earned commercial success with lead role in the Geo TV drama serial Sangdil. She made her film debut with the musical drama Rangreza, which was released in 2017.

== Acting career ==
On the experience of acting in her first drama serial, Ali described it as "tough" and considers 2015 as one of the most challenging years of her career . In 2017, based on her series of hit drama serials, she was reported to be "definitely one of the actresses to watch out for". She is known for playing intense roles. She made her comeback after a brief hiatus in 2024 for Hum TV and 2025's critically acclaimed 'Naqaab' February–May 2025.

== Filmography ==
Key
†	Denotes films that have not yet been released
	Denotes films that are currently running

Year	Film	Role	Notes
Films
2017	Rangreza	Saba	
2018	Maan Jao Na	Selena	
2019	Kaaf Kangana		
2019	Sirf Tum Hi To Ho		
2020	Gawah Rehna	TBA	
Television
2015	Ishqaaway		
2016	Main Kamli		Aaj Entertainment
2016	Aap Ke Liye	Areesha	
2016	Sangdil	Zobia	
2016	Dharkan	Esha	
2016	Saya-e-Dewar Bhi Nahi	Shiza	
2016	Besharam	Saba	
2016	Ahsas	Maryam	Urdu 1
2016	Jaan'nisar	Saara	
2017	Be Inteha	Zara	
2017	Sun Yaara	Tania	
2017	Sawera	Sawera	
2017	Bedardi Saiyaan	Baila	
2017	Agar Tum Saath Ho	Maria	
2018	Ustani Jee	Abeera	
2018	Kis Din Mera Viyah Howay Ga 4	Hania	
2018	Saaya	Maheen	
2018	Kabhi Band Kabhi Baja		
2018	Kyunke Ishq Baraye Farokht Nahi		
2019	Hania	Maira	
2019	Choti Choti Batain		
2019	Bhool	Raniya	
2020	Dil Ruba	Natasha	Hum TV
2020	Saraab	Warda	Hum TV
2020	Mohabbatain Chahatein		Hum TV
2021	Ajnabi Humsafar	Kinza	
2021	Benaam		
2025	Naqaab	Zara	
