= Aijaz Aslam =

Pakistani television actor, model, and producer

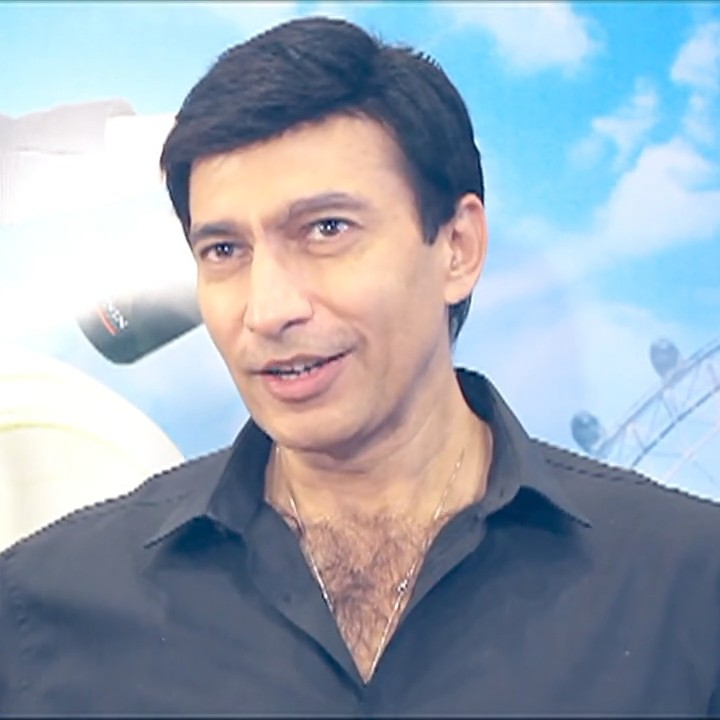
- Aslam in 2014
- Born: 3 October 1966 (age 60); Karachi, Sindh, Pakistan
- Occupations: Actor; Model; Fashion Designer; Producer
- Years active: 1989-present
- Notable work: Kashkol; Mehndi; Shehr-e-Dil Ke Darwaze; Kis Din Mera Viyah Howay Ga
- Height: 182 cm (6 ft 0 in)

Aijaz Aslam (born 3 October 1966; Urdu: اعجاز اسلم) is a Pakistani television actor and model. He is best known for playing the lead in his drama debut Kashkol, which was telecasted on NTM in 1993, in PTV's 2003 drama Mehndi and Geo TV's 2011 sitcom Kis Din Mera Viyah Howay Ga.

== Early life ==
Born to a father who acted in some television plays, Aijaz began his career as a model in 1989.

He belongs to a family of Kashmiri descent.

== Career ==
=== Acting and production ===
Aijaz made his television debut in the 1993 drama series Kashkol. He then went on to star in popular television serials such as Kahaan Se Kahaan Tak on PTV, Khahish-e-Benaam and Mehndi. His comedy drama, Main Aur Tum on ARY Digital, was extremely popular.

In 2015, Aijaz became a producer with ICE Media and Entertainment.

=== Fashion design ===
Aijaz Aslam is also a fashion designer and model in the Pakistan show business industry. Prior to entering the media industry, Aijaz completed a fashion designing course in London in 1989. He has made a name for himself in the fashion industry, and has his own clothing brand called Aijaz Aslam.

=== Business ===
In 2020, Aijaz established his second business venture, a personal care line 'Aijaz Aslam Fragrances' in collaboration with the skincare brand Hemani, in addition to the clothing brand he had already launched.

== Selected filmography ==
=== Films ===
Year	Title	Role	Notes	Refs.
2002	Daira	Raider	Adaptation of Mohsin Hamid's Moth Smoke	
2017	Raasta	Inspector Sultan		

=== Television serials ===
Year	Title	Role	Producer	Channel	Notes	Ref
1993	Kashkol	Roshu		NTM	Debut drama	
1995	Yeh Jahan			PTV		
1996	Tumharay Saharay	Danish		PTV		
1999	Aik Teray Milnay Sey Phelay			PTV		
2002	Thori Khushi Thora Ghum	Amir		PTV		
2003	Doosri Aurat			PTV		
2003	Mehndi	Rameez		PTV		
2004	Bezaban			PTV		
2004	Phir Youn Love Hua			PTV		
2005	Hum Se Juda Na Hona			PTV	Lux Style Awards winning play	
2005	Dharkan			Geo TV		
2005	Tum Kahan Hum Kahan			Geo TV		
2005	Dost			ARY Digital		
2005-08	Main Aur Tum	Sherry		ARY Digital		
2008	Mujhe Apna Bana Lo			Hum TV		
2008	Sherdil			ARY Digital		
2009	Muhabbat Kon Rokay			ARY Digital		
2009	Khawahish e Bay Naam			Geo TV		
2009	Rishtay Mohabbaton Kay			Hum TV		
2009	Ishq Junoon Deewangi			Hum TV		
2009	Meri An Suni Kahani			Hum TV		
2010	Shehre-Dil Key Darwazay			ARY Digital		
2010	Tere Liye			ARY Digital		
2010	Saraab			ARY Digital		
2010	Yariyan	Shah Jahan	Yes	Geo TV		
2010	Barish Kay Aansoo			Geo TV		
2011	Tere Ishq Mein			Hum TV		
2011	Kiya Meri Shadi Shahrukh Say Hogi			Geo TV		
2011	Kaisi Hain Doorian			ARY Digital		
2011	Bulbulay	Rosho		ARY Digital	Cameo appearance	
2012	Shadi Mubarak			ARY Digital		
2012	Band Bajay Ga			ARY Digital		
2012	Baandi	Malik Shehryar		ARY Digital		
2012	Topi Drama			ARY Digital		
2012	Dil Tou Bhatkay Ga			Geo TV		
2012	Bano Bazaar			Geo TV		
2011-2018	Kis Din Mera Viyah Howay Ga	Chaudhry Nazakat		Geo TV		
2012–13	Mera Pehla Pyar	Irfan		ARY Digital		
2013	Meri Zindagi Hai Tu			Geo TV		
2013	Aye Dasht e Junoon			Hum TV		
2013	Dil-e-Muztar	Dr. Imaad		Hum TV		
2013	Lamha			Hum TV		
2013	Pul Siraat			ARY Digital		
2013	Kahani Aik Raat Ki			ARY Digital		
2013	Parchaiyan			ARY Digital		
2013	Siskiyan			ARY Digital		
2013	Band Khirkyon Kay Peechay	Daniyal		TV One		
2014	Pachtawa		Yes	ARY Digital		
2015	Zara Si Bhool			TV One		
2015	Dil Ka Kia Rung Karun	Ahmer		Hum TV		
2015	Dil Ishq	Mansoor	Yes	Geo TV		
2016	Jab Tak Ishq Nahi Hota			Express TV		
2016	Ahsas	No	Yes	Urdu 1		
2016	Dekho Chand Aaya	Mamoo	Yes	Geo Entertainment		
2017	Khan	Jameel		Geo Entertainment		
2017	Tere Bina	No	Yes	Geo Entertainment		
2017	Malkin	No	Yes	Geo Entertainment		
2017	Pujaran			TVOne		
2017	Wafa Ka Mausam			TVOne		
2017	Dil Nawaz	No	Yes	A-Plus TV		
2017	Shiza	Faraz		ARY Digital		
2018	Khalish	No	Yes	Geo Entertainment		
2019	Cheekh	Yawer Taseer		ARY Digital		
2019	Dolly Darling	Mustaqeem		Geo TV		
2019	Ramz-e-Ishq	Wajahat Ali		Geo TV		
2019	Qismat Ka Likha	Obaid	Yes	Express TV		
2020	Suffer	Asif		Web series		
2020	Log Kya Kahenge	Haseeb		ARY Digital	Cameo	
2020	Nand	Jehangir		ARY Digital	Supporting role	
2020	Gustakh	No	Yes			
2020	Uraan	Atif Nawaz		Geo TV	Antagonist	
2021	Teri Behisi	Nadeem		Geo TV	Lead role	
2022	Noor			Express TV	Supporting role	
2023	Mein	Amir		Geo TV	Supporting role	
2024	Fanaa	Gul Hayat Khan		Green TV	Lead role	
2025	Jab Tak Ishq Nahi Hota	Qasim		Express TV	Lead role	
2025	Baray Bhaiya	Kabir		Geo TV	Lead role	
2025	Kaarzar-e-Dua	Ali		Geo TV	Supporting role	
2025	Pehli Barish	Behzad		Geo TV	Lead role	

==== Anthology series ====
Year	Title	Role	Channel	Notes	Ref
2012	Kitni Girhain Baaki Hain	Abbas	Hum TV		
2017	Kitni Girhain Baaki Hain (season 2)	Mansoor	Hum TV	Ep:14	
2018	Kabhi Band Kabhi Baja		Express Entertainment	Ep:20	
2018	Ustani Jee	Zubair	Hum TV	Ep:6	
2024	Raaz		Green TV	Ep:7	

=== Telefilms ===
Year	Title	Role	Channel	Notes	Ref
2012	Eid Pe Aao Na	Sajid	ARY Digital	Eid special	
2012	Pyar Mein Twins	Ali	ARY Digital	Eid special	
2017	J.I.T	Jimmy	ARY Digital	Eid special	
2018	Hum do Hamare Saw		ARY Digital	Eid special	
2019	Apni Apni Love Story	Umar	ARY Digital	Eid special	
2020	Ranchor Line Ki Rajjo		ARY Digital	Eid special	
2023	Benaqab	Safdar	Hum TV		

=== Reality shows and game shows ===
Year	Title	Notes	ref
2018	Mazaaq Raat	Special appearance	
2018	Tonite with HSY	Special appearance	
2018	The After Moon Show	Special appearance	
2019	Croron Mein Khel	Special appearance	
2019	Jeeto Pakistan	Special appearance	
2019	Bol Nights with Ahsan Khan	Special appearance	
2020	Good Morning Pakistan	Special appearance	
2021	Jeeto Pakistan League (Season 2)	Quetta Knights Captain	
2022	Jeeto Pakistan League (Season 3)	Gujranwala Bulls Captain	
2025	Tamasha (Season 4)	Temporary Baadshah Salamat	
2026	Tamasha (Season 5)	Special appearance	
