= Faysal Quraishi =

Pakistani actor, producer and television host

- فیصل قریشی
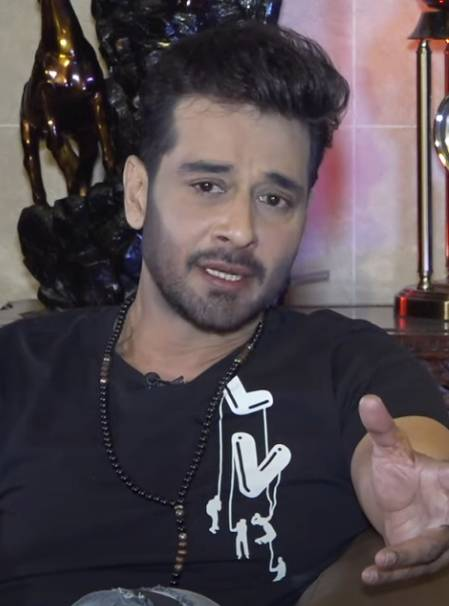
- Qureshi in 2022
- Born: 26 October 1973 (age 53); Lahore, Punjab, Pakistan
- Occupations: Actor; Producer; Host
- Years active: 1984–present
- Notable work: Boota from Toba Tek Singh (1999); Meri Zaat Zarra-e-Benishan (2010); Bashar Momin (2014); Kis Din Mera Viyah Howay Ga (2011-2018); Muqaddar (2020); Fitoor (2022); Khaie (2024)
- Spouses: Rozina (m. 1992; div. 2000) Aisha Agha (m. 2001; sep. 2003) Sana Faysal (m. 2010)
- Children: 3, including Hanish Quraishi
- Mother: Afshan Qureshi
- Relatives: Rozina Qureshi (aunt); Saima Qureshi (cousin)

Faysal Quraishi (Urdu: فیصل قریشی; born on 26 October 1973) is a Pakistani actor and television host. He is one of Pakistan's highest-paid actors. He is the recipient of more than 20 nationally recognised awards. He first gained recognition for playing the leading role of Boota in the television series Boota from Toba Tek Singh (1999) and has been a part of more than 200 projects. Quraishi hosted a morning show called Muskurati Morning with Faisal Qureshi from 2010 to 2014 on TV One. From 2016 to 2019, he hosted the morning show Salam Zindagi on ARY Zindagi. He was also the host of a game show called Jeet Ka Dum on Hum TV and is currently hosting another game show, Khush Raho Pakistan, on BOL TV.

== Early life ==
Quraishi was born to actress Afshan Qureshi and Abid Quraishi, who had a brief career as an actor. Abid Qureshi died when Faysal was quite young. Faysal's other relatives in the entertainment industry include Rozina Qureshi, his aunt, as well his cousin Saima Qureshi and her son Daniyal Khan, who have all acted.

== Career ==
=== Television ===
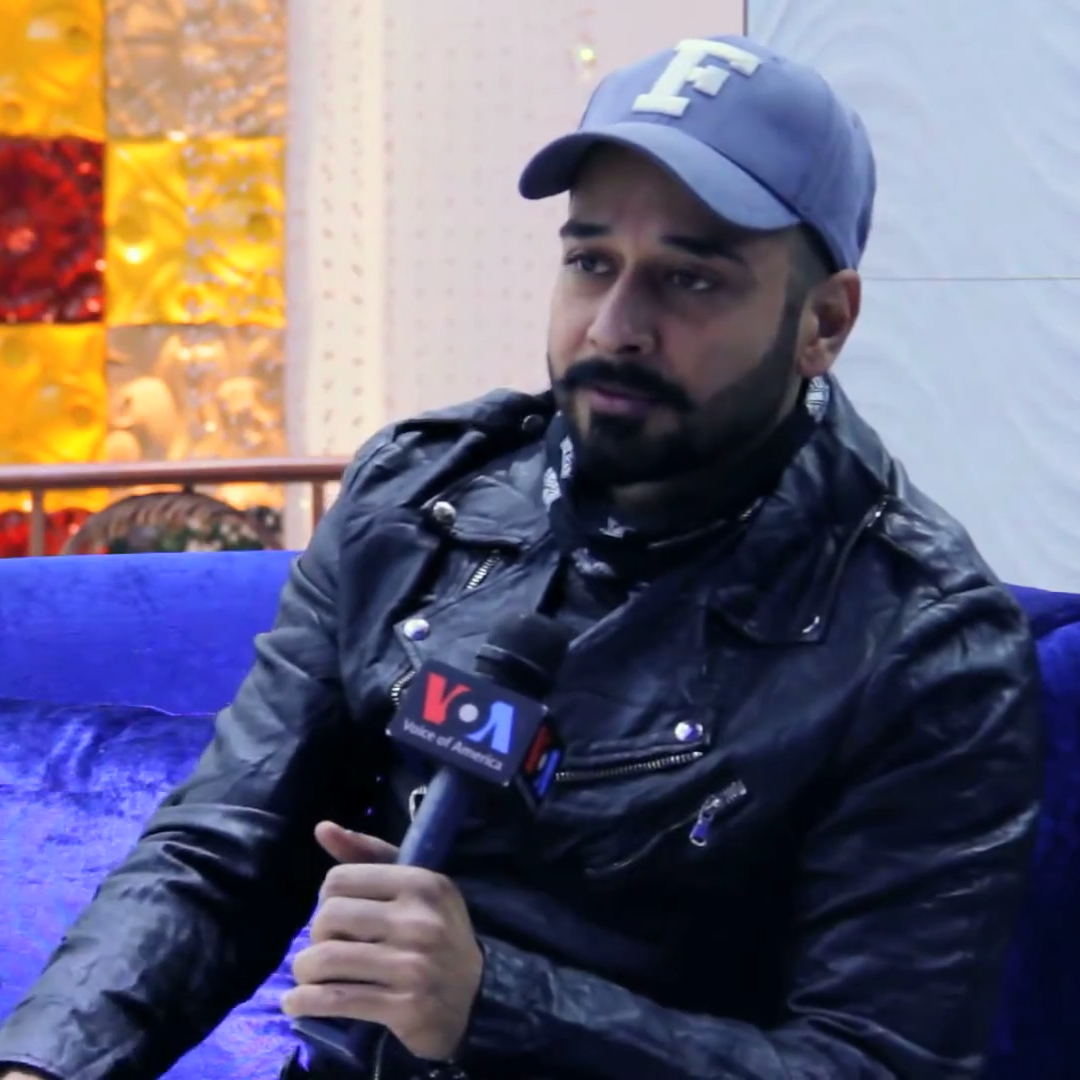
Quraishi in 2016

Quraishi began his career as a child artist and appeared in the plays Emergency Ward and Andhera Ujala for PTV. He first played minor roles in television serials before landing his first lead role as Boota in Boota from Toba Tek Singh in 1999, which made him an overnight star. Faysal also played the leading role in Bashar Momin (2014), the first Pakistani drama to air on Indian television. He also played a variety of characters in many critically acclaimed dramas, including Meri Zaat Zarra-e-Benishan (2009), Meri Ansuni Kahani (2009), Masuri (2005), Roag (2014), Main Abdul Qadir Hoon (2010), Qaid-e-Tanhai (2010), Kis Din Mera Viyah Howay Ga (2011–2018), Rang Laaga (2015), Khalish (2018), Muqaddar (2020), and many others. In 2015, Daily Pakistan reported that Faysal had become one of the highest-paid artists in television, charging Rs. 3 million per episode. He continues to be one of the most sought-after and highest-paid actors in Pakistan today.

Faysal has appeared as a judge on competition shows Dum Hai To Entertain Kar and Nachle. He also hosted the reality show Hero Banney Ki Tarang and the morning show Muskurati Morning on TV One. From 2016 to 2019, Quraishi hosted the morning show Salam Zindagi on ARY Zindagi. He was appointed Children's Literature Festival (CLF) Goodwill Ambassador on 30 July 2019.

=== Films ===
He made his film acting debut in 1992. He became a producer in 2017 with the production house Connect Studios, and owns a film production house named Faysal Quraishi Films.

In 2023, it was announced that he would make his Punjabi debut with Abu Aleeha's action-thriller Mango Jatt.

=== Music ===
In 2021, he appeared in the musical television series Kashmir Beats, performing the duet "O Yaara" alongside actress Faryal Mehmood; the song was featured as part of Season 1 of the show's studio format and explores themes of love and heartbreak.

== Filmography ==
=== Films ===
Year	Movie	Role	Notes	Ref.
1995	Panah	Honey		
1996	Sazaa	Faysal		
1996	Cheez Bari Hey Mast Mast			
1996	Do Jee Dar			
1997	Chand Girhan			
1997	Dil Bhi Tera Hum Bhi Teray			
1997	Dil Kisi Ka Dost Nahin			
1997	Miss Kalashankof			
1999	Insaniyat Kay Qatil	Kamran		
1999	Ghaddar			
2000	Marvi			
2000	Ham Khilari Pyar Kay			
2001	Sajan Ka Pyar			
2013	Aina	Nadeem	Remake of Aina (1977)	
2015	Good Morning Karachi	Shavaiz		
2015	Manto	Asim		
2016	Laloolal.com	Rameez		
2023	Money Back Guarantee		Cameo	
2025	Deemak	Faraz		
TBA	Sorry: A Love Story	—	Also co-producer	

=== Television ===
Year	Title	Role	Producer	Channel	Ref.
1983	Dour-e-Junoon	Aamir		PTV Home	
1984	Mirza And Sons	Mota		PTV Home	
1985	Andhera Ujala			PTV Home	
1985	Emergency Ward			PTV Home	
1995	Jin Pe Takiya Tha			PTV Home	
1999	Boota from Toba Tek Singh	Boota		PTV Home	
1999	Chandpur Ka Chandoo	Sohna		PTV Home	
2000	Good Bye Raishman	Daani		PTV Home	
2000	Harjaee			Indus TV	
2000	Chamak			PTV Home	
2001	Sawan	Yasir		PTV Home	
2003	Deewar			PTV Home	
2003	Umrao Jaan Ada	Gohar Mirza		Geo Entertainment	
2004	Khamosh	Saleem		PTV Home	
2004	Shahla Kot	Janu Dholia			
2005	Wajood e Laraib	Sheharyar		Indus TV	
2005	Tum Kahan Hum Kahan			Geo TV	
2005	Masuri	Sarang		PTV Home	
2005-2007	Main Aur Tum	Shams		Ary Digital	
2006	Lagan	Zoraiz		PTV Home	
2007	Man-o-Salwa	Sheraz		Hum TV	
2008	Jhumka Jaan			Hum TV	
2008	Kitni Door Kitne Paas			PTV Home	
2008	Chaar Chand			Geo Entertainment	
2008	Ab Ghar Jaane Do			Geo Entertainment	
2008	Abhi Abhi			Ary Digital	
2008	Madham Madham			Ary Digital	
2008	Dil Kay Afsanay			Ary Digital	
2009	Meri Zaat Zarra-e-Benishan	Aarfeen		Geo Entertainment	
2009	Aashti	Nazrul Islam		Hum TV	
2009	Baarish Kay Aansoo	Asim		Geo Entertainment	
2009	Meri Unsuni Kahani			Hum TV	
2009	Phir Kho Jaye Na			Ary Digital	
2009	Tere Liye			Ary Digital	
2009	Tikon			Ary Digital	
2009	The Ghost	Ayaan Daniyal		Hum TV	
2009	Ishq Junoon Deewangi	Musician		Hum TV	
2010	Tere Jaane Kay Baad			Hum TV	
2010	Sandal			Geo Entertainment	
2010	Diya Jalay	Sameer		ARY Digital	
2010	Qaid-e-Tanhai	Moiz		Hum TV	
2010	Main Abdul Qadir Hoon	Faiz Rasul		Hum TV	
2010	Yariyan	Babar		Geo Entertainment	
2010	Haal-e-Dil			Ary Digital	
2010-11	Dil Hai Chota Sa	Ahmer		Geo TV	
2011	Ishq Ibadat			Geo TV	
2011	Kya Meri Shaadi Shahrukh Se Hogi			Geo TV	
2011	Ek Hatheli Pe Hina Ek Hatheli Pe Lahoo	Najeeb		Geo TV	
2011	Mera Saaein	Aarish		Ary Digital	
2011	Roag	Ayaz		Ary Digital	
2011	Umm-e-Kulsoom	Nihal		Ary Digital	
2011	Akhri Barish	Nihal		Ary Digital	
2011	Khushboo Ka Ghar	Sikander		Ary Digital	
2011	Kis Din Mera Viyah Howay Ga	Sheedo		Geo Entertainment	
2012	Sabz Pari Laal Kabootar	Rafiq		Geo Entertainment	
2012	Mera Yaqeen	Asfar		Ary Digital	
2012	Kis Din Mera Viyah Howay Ga	Sheedo		Geo Entertainment	
2012-13	Mera Pehla Pyar	Taha		Ary Digital	
2013	Pachtawa			Ary Digital	
2013	Adhoori Aurat	Zayyan		Geo Entertainment	
2013	Kis Din Mera Viyah Howay Ga	Sheedo		Geo Entertainment	
2013	Mann Ke Moti	Rahil		Geo Entertainment	
2014	Mein Bushra	Faraz		ARY Digital	
2014	Bashar Momin	Bashar	Yes	Geo Entertainment	
2014	Iqraar	Shahbaz		Geo Entertainment	
2015	Maryam			Geo Entertainment	
2015	Bheegi Palkein	Hassan	Yes	A-Plus TV	
2015	Mol	Sheharyar		Hum TV	
2015	Rang Laaga	Aashiq Hussain		Ary Digital	
2015	Naraz	Azlan		Ary Digital	
2016	Tum Meri Ho	Zayyan		Ary Digital	
2016	Mera Yaar Miladay	Dabbu		Ary Digital	
2016	Waada	Shahab		Ary Digital	
2016	Aap Ke Liye	Shaheer		Ary Digital	
2017	Zaakham	Khawar		Ary Digital	
2017	Mein Aur Tum 2.0	Shams		Ary Digital	
2018	Main Manto	Asim		Geo TV	
2018	Kis Din Mera Viyah Howay Ga (Season 04)	Sheedo		Geo TV	
2018	Khalish	Sahil		Geo TV	
2018	Baba Jani	Asfand	Yes	Geo TV	
2018	Haiwan	Hameed		ARY Digital	
2018	Satrangi			A-Plus Entertainment	
2020	Muqaddar	Sardar Saif-ur-Rehman		Geo Entertainment	
2020	Gustakh	Rohail		Express Entertainment	
2020	Log Kya Kahenge	Saad		ARY Digital	
2021	Fitoor	Haider		Geo Entertainment	
2021	Dil-e-Momin	Momin Shahzad		Geo Entertainment	
2022	Farq	Kamal Hassan		Geo Entertainment	
2022	Hook	Jaffar Ilahi		ARY Digital	
2022	Aik Thi Laila	Azeem Ullah		Express Entertainment	
2023	Siyaah	SSP Rana Farrukh		Green Entertainment	
2023	Shikaar	Malik Bakhtawar		Green Entertainment	
2023	Zulm	Malik Ajlal		Hum TV	
2024	Khaie	Channar Khan		Geo Entertainment	
2025	Raaja Rani	Zaviar		Hum TV	
2025	Behroopia	Mikail / Taimur / Kabir / Junaid / Neha / Sameer / Waleed		Green Entertainment	
2025	Case No. 9	Kamran Haider		Geo Entertainment	

==== Other appearances ====
Year	Title	Role	Channel	Notes	Ref.
2007	Kaun		STN TV	In episode 5 Honeymoon	
2008	Resham Si Shaam	Ahsaan	Hum TV	An episode for Qissaon ki Chaadar mini-series	
2009	Mutthi Bhar Mitti	Muzaffar	Hum TV	An independence day special telefilm	
2009	Babies Unlimited	Humdum	Geo TV	An Eid special telefilm	
2009	Nass Baliye	Himself	ARY Digital	An Eid special telefilm	
2010	Talluq	Armaan	Geo TV	Appeared in Episode 2	
2010	Hum Kahani Meri Zubani		ARY Digital		
2010	Phir Kab Milo Ge		TV one		
2011	Dum Hai Tou Entertain Kar	Judge	ARY Digital	Reality show	
2012	Main Aur Tum Phir Se		ARY Digital	Comedy sitcom	
2015	Jeet Ka Dum	Host	Hum TV		
2017	Jimmy Immy Timmy (JIT)	Timmy	ARY Digital	Television film	
2016–2019	Salam Zindagi	Host	ARY Zindagi	Morning show	
2019	Jeeto Pakistan	Guest	ARY Digital		
2019	Bol Nights with Ahsan Khan	Guest	Bol TV		
2019	Khush Raho Pakistan	Host	Bol TV	Game show	

== Awards and nominations ==
=== Lux Style Awards ===
Year	Ceremony	Category	Work	Result	Ref(s)
2003	Lux Style Awards	Best TV Actor	Deewar	Nominated	
2004	Lux Style Awards	Best TV Actor	Harjaee	Nominated	
2004	Lux Style Awards	Best TV Actor	Umrao Jaan Ada	Nominated	
2005	Lux Style Awards	Best TV Actor (Satellite)	Main Aur Tum	Won	
2006	Lux Style Awards	Best TV Actor (Satellite)	Jaye Kahan Ye Dil	Nominated	
2006	Lux Style Awards	Best TV Actor (Terrestrial)	Masuri	Nominated	
2009	Lux Style Awards	Best TV Actor (Satellite)	Manay Na Ye Dil	Nominated	
2011	10th Lux Style Awards	Best TV Actor (Satellite)	Meri Zaat Zarra-e-Benishan	Won	
2012	11th Lux Style Awards	Best TV Actor (Satellite)	Roag	Won	
2013	12th Lux Style Awards	Best TV Actor (Satellite)	Jahez	Nominated	
2015	14th Lux Style Awards	Best TV Actor	Bashar Momin	Nominated	
2016	15th Lux Style Awards	Best TV Actor	Rang Laaga	Won	
2017	16th Lux Style Awards	Best TV Actor	Bheegi Palkein	Nominated	
2021	20th Lux Style Awards	Best TV Actor (Critics' Choice)	Muqaddar	Nominated	
2021	20th Lux Style Awards	Best TV Actor (Viewers' Choice)	Muqaddar	Nominated	

=== Other awards ===
Year	Ceremony	Category	Work	Result	Ref(s)
2014	Pakistan Media Awards	Best Television Actor	Adhoori Aurat	Won	
2023	1st Kya Drama Hai Icon Awards	Best Supporting Actor (Mini-Series)	Aik Thi Laila	Won	
2025	2nd Kya Drama Hai Icon Awards	Best Actor (Popular Choice)	Khaie	Nominated	
2025	2nd Kya Drama Hai Icon Awards	Best Actor (Critics’ Choice)	Khaie	Won	
2025	10th Hum Awards	Best Actor - Popular	Zulm	Nominated	
2025	10th Hum Awards	Best Actor - Jury	Zulm	Nominated	
2025	10th Hum Awards	Best Actor in a Negative Role	Zulm	Won	
2025	10th Hum Awards	Most Impactful Character	Zulm	Nominated	
2026	4th Pakistani Cinema Awards	Best Actor in Supporting Role (Male)	Deemak	Won	

== See also ==
- List of Pakistani actors
- List of people from Lahore
- Kis Din Mera Viyah Howay Ga
- Kis Din Mera Viyah Howay Ga (season 04)
