= Asif Raza Mir =

Pakistani film actor

- آصف رضا میر
- Born: Asif Raza Mir; 26 September 1959 (age 67); Lahore, Pakistan
- Education: St. Anthony High School, Lahore
- Occupations: Actor; Producer
- Years active: 1976-present
- Children: 2, including Ahad Raza Mir
- Father: Raza Mir

Asif Raza Mir (Urdu: آصف رضا میر) is a Pakistani film and TV actor and producer.

He is known for his roles in TV plays Samundar (1983), Tanhaiyaan (1985) and Ishq Gumshuda (2010) and the films Daaman (1980), Badaltay Mausam (1980), and Maan Jao Na (2018).

In 2020, he made his international debut with the British crime-drama series Gangs of London.

== Early and personal life ==
Asif Raza Mir was born and brought up in Lahore, Punjab but later shifted to Karachi due to his professional work. For many years, he has also resided in Calgary, Canada where he has business interests.

He is the son of film director Raza Mir, who was the cinematographer for the first ever Pakistani film, Teri Yaad (1948). He is married to Samra Asif. They have two sons, Ahad Raza Mir and Adnan Raza Mir, both actors.

== Career ==
=== Actor ===
Since starting his acting career aged 17, he has worked in several films and has also been part of several famous TV series.

Asif Raza Mir's international debut was in 2020 with the British series Gangs of London. He is a series regular on this project.

=== Producer ===
At the height of his popularity as a leading actor, he expanded into advertising and became the co-owner, alongside actress Uzma Gilani, of the advertising and production company Blazon. The company was among the pioneers in Pakistan to digitize its art department and was involved in various projects, including the music program Gold Leaf Rhythm Whythm, which featured some of the country's earliest music videos. Notably, Blazon also produced videos for Ustad Nusrat Fateh Ali Khan. After approximately a decade of operations, the company ceased its activities, and he subsequently relocated to Canada.

In 2009, he founded A&B Entertainment with Babar Javed, a television production house which in 2013 was considered the "second-largest television studio" in Pakistan, after Moomal Productions. The company played a significant role in reshaping Pakistan's drama industry by developing content for multiple networks, introducing new talent, and experimenting with diverse storytelling formats. Around five years after its inception, A&B ceased operations.

== Selected filmography ==
=== Films ===
Year	Movie	Language	Note	Ref.
1978	Playboy	Urdu	Leading role	
1980	Daaman	Urdu	Leading role	
1980	Badalte Mausam	Urdu	Leading role	
1980	Saathi	Urdu	Leading role	
1980	Haye Yeh Shohar	Urdu	Supporting role	
1980	Vadda Thanedar	Punjabi	Supporting role	
1981	Wafa	Urdu	Leading role	
1981	Mere Apne	Urdu	Leading role	
1983	Chorun Qutab	Punjabi	Leading role	
1983	Kainaat	Urdu	Supporting role	
2018	Maan Jao Na	Urdu	Supporting role	
2018	Parwaaz Hai Junoon	Urdu	Supporting role	
2022	London Nahi Jaunga	Urdu	Supporting role	
2027	Inspector Jamshed: The Secret Parchment	English; Urdu	Lead role	

=== Television series ===
Year	Title	Role	Producer	Network	Notes
1983	Wadi-e-Purkhar	Ahmar		PTV	Leading role
1983	Samundar	Nasir		PTV	Leading role
1984	Aangan Terha	Bunty		PTV	Guest appearance
1985	Tanhaiyaan	Zain		PTV	Leading role
1992	Tansen	Tansen		PTV	Leading role
2001	Badlon Par Basaira	Asif		PTV	Supporting role
2007	Sarkar Sahab	Sarkar Sahab		ARY Digital	Leading role
2010	Diya Jalay	Faizan Ali Shah	Yes	ARY Digital	Supporting role; also producer
2010	Ishq Gumshuda	Alizeh's father		Hum TV	Supporting role
2010	Qaid-e-Tanhai	Moiz's friend		Hum TV	Supporting role
2010	Main Abdul Qadir Hoon	Abdul Qadir's father	Yes	Hum TV	Supporting role; also producer
2011	Roag	Abid	Yes	ARY Digital	Leading role; also producer
2012	Tanhaiyan Naye Silsilay	Zain		ARY Digital	Leading role; sequel to the 1985 series Tanhaiyaan
2014	Bashar Momin	No	Yes	Geo Entertainment	Producer
2016	Sangdil	No	Yes	Geo Entertainment	Producer
2016	Muqabil	Masood		ARY Digital	Leading role
2016	Kitni Girhain Baqi Hain	Hameed Azfar / Atif		Hum TV	Anthology series: appears in episodes 8 & 30
2017	Parchayee	Khawar		Hum TV	Supporting role
2018	Khalish	Altamash		Geo Entertainment	Supporting role
2020-2025	Gangs of London	Asif Afridi		Sky Atlantic	Leading role; British series
2023	Jhok Sarkar	Peeral		Hum TV	Leading role
2024	Meem Se Mohabbat	Abid Ahmed		Hum TV	Supporting role
2025	Main Manto Nahi Hoon	Siraj Amritsari		ARY Digital	Supporting role
2026	Winter Love	Gulzar		Hum TV	Supporting role

== Awards and nominations ==
He and Ahad Raza Mir are the only father-son duo to win Best TV Actor at the Lux Style Awards.

Year	Ceremony	Category	Project	Result
2008	7th Lux Style Awards	Best TV Actor (Terrestrial)	Meray Dard Ko Jo Zuban Miley	Won
2009	8th Lux Style Awards	Best TV Actor (Satellite)	Sarkar Sahab	Nominated
2024	9th Hum Awards	Most Impactful Character	Jhok Sarkar	Nominated
2024	9th Hum Awards	Best Supporting Actor	Jhok Sarkar	Won
