= List of programmes broadcast by Zee Zindagi =

The following is a list of programmes that were broadcast by Zee Zindagi, also known as Zindagi TV.

== Current programming ==
=== Zindagi Originals ===
Series	Premiere
Churails	11 August 2020
Dhoop Ki Deewar	25 June 2021
Qatil Haseenaon Ke Naam	10 December 2021
Mrs. & Mr. Shameem	11 March 2022
Barzakh	19 July 2024

=== Acquired series ===
Year	Show	Notes
2020	Baaghi	
2020	Tum Kon Piya	
2020	Mera Naam Yousuf Hai	
2020	Diyar-e-Dil	
2020	Baba Jani	
2020	Bunty I Love You	
2020	O Rangreza	
2020	Goodbye to Goodbye	
2020	My Secret Terrius	
2020	Partners for Justice	
2020	Queen of Mystery	
2020	My Golden Life	
2020	Witch at Court	
2020	Rukhsaar	
2021	Meri Behan Maya	
2021	Piya Mann Bhaye	
2021	Iqrar	
2021	Choti	
2021	Numm	
2021	Ek Kasak Reh Gayi	
2021	Gohar-e-Nayab	
2021	Nanhi	
2021	Manjali	
2021	Jo Chale To Jaan Se Guzar Gaye	
2021	Aasmanon Pay Likha	
2021	Mere Humdum Mere Dost	
2021	Deedan	
2021	Umm-e-Haniya	
2021	Be Aib	
2021	Mi Raqsam	
2018	Pablo Escobar, The Drug Lord	
2018	Relationship Status:It's Complicated	
2018	Bread, Love and Dreams	
2018	Descendants of the Sun	
2018	Boys Over Flowers	
2018	Snowdrop	
2018	The Girl	

Above dramas listed are not aired by Zindagi channel when it is used to air on Television platform. However, these dramas are broadcast by ZEE5 without any prior advertisement.

From 1 May 2025, Zindagi channel started airing Zee Classic Shows from ZEE library.

== Former programming ==
Year	Show	Notes
2017	A Love Story	
2015-2016	Aadhe Adhoore	
2014	Aaina Dulhan Ka	
2015	Aaj Rang Hai	
2015	Aaja Sajna Miliye Juliye	
2016	Aapki Antara	
2016-2017	Agar Tum Saath Ho	
2016	Arranged Marriage	
2015	Ashk	
2014	Aunn Zara	
2015	Azar Ki Ayegi Baraat	
2015	Badalte Rishtey	
2016	Babul Ki Duwayen Leti Jaa	
2014	Badi Aapa	
2014	Behadd	
2014-2015	Bezubaan	
2015-2016	Bhaage Re Mann	
2016	Bhaage Re Mann	
2015	Bilqees Kaur	
2016	Bin Tere	
2017	Boys Over Flowers	
2015	Daagh	
2015	Daam	
2015	Darmiyaan	
2015	Deewana Kise Banayegi Yeh Ladki	
2017	Descendants of the Sun	
2014	Dhoop Chhaon	
2015	Dil-e-Muztar	
2016	Do Qadam Door Thay	
2015	Dolly Ki Ayegi Baraat	
2016	Ek Kasak Reh Gaee	
2016	Ek Mohabbat Ke Baad	
2016	Ek Tamanna Lahasil Si	
2016-2017	Fatmagül'ün Suçu Ne?	
2015-2016	Feriha	
2016	Feriha	
2014-2015	Gauhar	
2015	Gulon Mein Rang	
2014	Humsafar	
2015	Ijaazat	
2014	Ishq Gumshuda	
2016	Ishq Mein Teray	
2016	Ishqaaway	
2015	Izzat	
2015-2016	Jab We Wed	
2015	Jackson Heights	
2016	Kaash Aisa Ho	
2014	Kaash Main Teri Beti Na Hoti	
2015	Kabhi Aashna Kabhi Ajnabi	
2015	Kabhi Kabhi	
2014	Kahi Unkahi	
2014-2015	Kaisi Ye Qayamat	
2016	Kankar	
2015	Kashmakash	
2015	Khoya Khoya Chand	
2016-2017	Khwaabon Ki Zamin Par	
2015	Khwahishein	
2015	Kisi Ki Khatir	
2014-2015	Kitni Girhain Baaki Hain	
2016	Kuch Pyar Ka Pagalpan	
2016-2017	Kuzey Güney	
2017	Kuzey Güney	
2015	Ladki Hona Gunaah Nahin	
2016-2017	Little Lord	
2014	Maat	
2016	Maaye Ni	
2014	Madiha Maliha	
2016	Main Abdul Qadir Hoon	
2016	Main Bushra	
2015	Malaal	
2016	Malika-e-Aliya	
2015	Mann Ke Moti	
2016	Mann Ke Moti	
2014	Mastana Mahi	
2015	Mausam	
2016	Mein Hari Piya	
2015	Meri Behan Maya	
2014	Mera Naseeb	
2014	Mera Saaya	
2016	Mere Harjai	
2016	Mere Humdum Mere Dost	
2015	Mere Hamrahi	
2014	Meray Qatil Meray Dildar	
2016	Meri Beti	
2015	Mata-e-Jaan Hai Tu	
2015	Meri Talaash	
2016	Meri Zindagi Hai Tu	
2016	Mohabat Subh Ka Sitara Hai	
2016	Na Kaho Tum Mere Nahi	
2015-2016	Namak Paray	
2016	Nanhi	
2015-2016	Neeyat	
2015	Nirmala's Spice World	
2015	Noor Bano	
2014	Noorpur Ki Rani	
2016	Numm	
2016	Pani Jaisa Piyar	
2015	Piya Re	
2015	Pyaar Ka Haq	
2015	Pyarey Afzal	
2015	Qaid-e-Tanhai	
2015	Ranjish	
2015	Rehaai	
2015	Ru Baru	
2015	Ruswaiyaan	
2015	Saare Mausam Tumse Hee	
2015	Sabki Laadli...Laraib	
2015	Sasural Ki Galli	
2016	Shehr-e-Ajnabi	
2015	Shehr-e-Zaat	
2015	Shikkan	
2015-2016	Shukk	
2015	Shukriya	
2015	Simply Beautiful	
2015	Sitamgar	
2017	Snowdrop	
2014	Tere Ishq Mein	
2016	Teri Berukhi	
2015	Teri Raza	
2015	Tanhai	
2014	Thakan	
2017	Total Dreamer	
2016-2017	TV Ke Uss Paar	
2016	Vasl	
2015	Waqt Ne Kiya Kya Haseen Sitam	
2014-2015	Ye Galiyaan Ye Chaubaara	
2015	Yeh Phool Sa Naazuk Chehra	
2015	Yahan Pyar Nahin Hai	
2015	Yeh Sasuraal Bemisaal	
2014	Yeh Shadi Nahi Ho Sakti	
2014	Zindagi Gulzar Hai	
2015	Zindagi Teletime	
