= 2nd Hum Awards =

2014 Pakistani entertainment awards

- The promotional logo of the Service; 2nd Hum Awards, 2014
- Date: 29 March 2014; 25 May 2014 (televised)
- Site: Expo Center, Karachi; Sindh, Pakistan
- Hosted by: Meekal Zulfiqar; Sanam Saeed; Vasay Chaudhry (co-host); Sanam Jung (co-host)
- Produced by: Nazeer Saeed Janjua
- Directed by: Hajji Al Balos; Nazeer Saeed Janjua
- Organized by: Humawards

Highlights
- Best Drama Serial (Jury): Zindagi Gulzar Hai
- Best Drama Serial (Popular): Zindagi Gulzar Hai
- Most awards: Zindagi Gulzar Hai (9)
- Most nominations: Zindagi Gulzar Hai, Dil-e-Muztar and Aseerzadi (13)

Television coverage
- Channel: Hum TV
- Network: Hum
- Duration: 2 hours, 45 minutes

The 2nd Hum Awards ceremony, presented by the Hum Television Network and Entertainment Channel (HTNEC), sponsored by Servis and Telenor Talkshawlk, honored the best in fashion, music and Hum Television Dramas of 2013. The ceremony took place on 29 March 2014 at Expo Center in Karachi, Sindh beginning at 7:30 PST. The ceremony was recorded and was broadcast on 25 May 2014. During the ceremony, Hum Television Network and Entertainment Channel presented awards in 29 regular categories along with 2 in honorary and 1 in special category. The ceremony was televised in Pakistan by Hum TV, while Servis returned as a main sponsor of the show.

Television personalities Meekal Zulfiqar and Sanam Saeed hosted the show along with Sanam Jung and Vasay Chaudhry. Meekal Zulfiqar and Vasay Chaudhry hosted the show for a second time, having hosted the previous ceremony. During the ceremony, Hum also held its annual Honorary Awards, which were presented by host Fahad Mustafa.

Zindagi Gulzar Hai won nine awards, the most for the ceremony, including Best Director Drama Serial for Sultana Siddiqui and Best Drama Serial Jury and Best Drama Serial Popular for Momina Duraid. Aseerzadi won three awards including Best Actress and Best Supporting Actor, for Sania Saeed and Salman Shahid respectively. Dil-e-Muztar and Ek Pagal Si Larki won two awards each. While others dramas to win one award were Rehaai, Ishq Humari Galion Main, Extras – The Mango People, Rishtay Kuch Adhorey Se, Behadd and Ullu Baraye Farokht Nahi.

== Winners and nominees ==
The nominees of the 2nd Hum Awards were announced on 2 March 2014 at the bloggers meeting by GM Public Relations and Publications Shehnaz Ramzi, In meeting, only four categories were announced which were set open for public voting on channels official website, while the rest of the categories were announced during the ceremony. Television categories were split into Viewers Choice and Jury Choice portions. Zindagi Gulzar Hai, Aseerzadi and Dil-e-Muztar tied for the most nominations with thirteen each, and Zindagi Gulzar Hai bags nine awards in all of its nominations.

Noman Ejaz and Samina Peerzada became the second time winner of Best Actor and Best Supporting Actress awards, respectively. Sania Saeed and Salman Shahid wins in the Best Actress and Best Supporting Actor categories respectively made Aseerzadi the second drama to win both leading acting awards. Umera Ahmad won Best Writer Drama Serial for Zindagi Gulzar Hai, which was her second successive win. Umera was the only individual whose work were nominated in all main categories, including Best Actor and Best Actress (Viewers/Jury), Best Supporting Actor/Actress, and Best Television Film which ultimately won for director Asim Raza.

Sanam Saeed and Fawad Khan won the Best Actress Popular and Best Actor Popular receptively. Fawad and Sanam won both Jury and Viewers Choice category of Best Onscreen Couple. Arij Fatyma was the only soap actress to be nominated consecutive for Best Soap Actress and ultimately won. Humayoun Ashraf won the Best Soap actor for the Soap Ishq Humari Galiyoun Mein. Momina Duraid, Fawad Khan, Sanam Saeed and Noman Ejaz were the only individuals to win multiple awards, with two trophies each.

=== Awards ===
Winners are listed first and highlighted in boldface.

==== Television ====
Jury Choice Categories
Best Drama Serial	Best Director Drama Serial
**Momina Duraid for MD Productions – Zindagi Gulzar Hai**; Momina Duraid for MD Productions – Dil-e-Muztar; Momina Duraid for MD Productions – Aseerzadi; Momina Duraid for MD Productions – Humnasheen; Humayun Saeed and Shahzad Nasib for Six Sigma Entertainment – Kankar; Noman Masood for MD Productions – Ullu Baraye Farokht Nahi; Momina Duraid for MD Productions – Rehaai; Momina Duraid for MD Productions – Rishtay Kuch Adhoray Se; Barkat Siddiqui for MD Productions – Mujhe Khuda Pe Yaqeen Hai	**Sultana Siddiqui – Zindagi Gulzar Hai**; Shehzad Kashmiri – Dil-e-Muztar; Ehteshamuddin – Aseerzadi; Siraj-ul-Haq – Humnasheen; Abis Raza – Kankar; Kashif Nisar – Ullu Baraye Farokht Nahi; Mehreen Jabbar – Rehaai; Barkat Siddiqui – Mujhe Khuda Pe Yaqeen Hai; Farooq Rind – Rishtey Kuch Adhoray Se
Best Actor	Best Actress
**Noman Ejaz – Rehaai** as Akram; Ahsan Khan – Mujhe Khuda Pe Yaqeen Hai as Arham; Adnan Siddiqui – Humnasheen as Munir; Mikaal Zulfiqar – Mujhe Khuda Pe Yaqeen Hai as Shaiq; Imran Abbas Naqvi – Dil-e-Muztar as Adil; Fahad Mustafa – Kankar as Sikandar; Fawad Khan – Zindagi Gulzar Hai as Zaroon	**Sania Saeed – Aseerzadi** as Bari Sarkarni; Sanam Saeed – Zindagi Gulzar Hai as Kashaf; Sanam Jung – Dil-e-Muztar as Silah; Saba Qamar – Ullu Baraye Farokht Nahi as Gul-e-Rana; Yumna Zaidi – Rishtay Kuch Adhooray Se as Kiran; Sanam Baloch – Kankar as Kiran; Samina Peerzada – Rehaai as Shameem Beghum
Best Supporting Actor	Best Supporting Actress
**Salman Shahid – Aseerzadi** as Peer Jalaal; Deepak Perwani – Kadurat as Mehmood; Mehmood Aslam – Rishtay Kuch Adhooray Se as Abd-ul-Manan; Waseem Abbas – Zindagi Gulzar Hai as Murtaza; Noor Hassan Rizvi – Aseerzadi as Shahaab; Danish Taimoor – Rehaai as Akmal	**Samina Peerzada – Zindagi Gulzar Hai** as Rafia; Maria Wasti – Rehaai as Shehnaz; Sakina Samo – Aseerzadi as Amna; Saniya Shamshad – Rehaai as Kulsoom; Saniya Shamshad – Aseerzadi as Fatima; Yumna Zaidi – Ullu Baraye Farokht Nahi as Asia; Arij Fatyma – Humnasheen as Mehrunisa; Isra Ghazal – Ullu Baraye Farokht Nahi as Aapi
Best Soap Actor	Best Soap Actress
**Humayun Ashraf – Ishq Hamari Galiyon Mein** as Haroon; Agha Ali – Mein Hari Piya as Salman; Azfar Rehman – Ek pagal Si Larki as Afaan; Bilal Qureshi – Chubhan as Shehryar	**Arij Fatyma – Ek Pagal Si Larki** as Roomi; Soniya Hussain – Mein Hari Piya as Parizah; Sidra Batool – Ishq Hamari Galiyon Mein as Falak; Nimra Khan – Chubhan as Zara; Urwa Hocane – Ek pagal Si Larki as Imaan
Best Comic Sitcom	Best Soap Series
**Danish Nawaz – Extras (The Mango People)**; Salman Abbas (Nomi) – Halka Na Lo; Zahida Khan – Namak Paray	**Ek Pagal Si Larki – Misbah Khalid**; Ishq Hamari Galiyon Mein – Misbah Khalid; Mein Hari Piya – Misbah Khalid; Chubhan – Humayun Saeed and Shehzad Naseeb
Best Writer Drama Serial	Best Television Film
**Umera Ahmad – Zindagi Gulzar Hai**; Umera Ahmad – Kankar; Farhat Ishtiaq – Rehaai; Aliya Bukhari – Dil-e-Muztar; Mustafa Afridi – Aseerzadi; Shehla Shakoor – Humnasheen; Amna Mufti – Ullu Baraye Farokht Nahi; Nadia Akhtar – Rishtay Kuch Adhooray Se	**Behadd –MD Productions**; Jub Hum Millay –Show Case Communications; Ek Mamoli Si Larki – MD Productions; Zarra Si Aurat – Angelic Films; Saaya – Show Case Communications; Souten Meri Saheli –Evolution Media
Best Negative Actor	Best Impactful Character
**Noman Ejaz – Ullu Baraye Farokht Nahi** as Ghulam Fareed; Sarwat Gillani – Dil-e-Muztar as Zoya; Imran Aslam – Jia Na Jaye as Sadiq; Sanam Saeed – Kadurat as Minah; Ayesha Khan – Mujhe Khuda Pe Yaqeen Hai as Narmeen; Faiza Hasan – Humnasheen as Asmat Aara	**Sakina Samo – Aseerzadi** as Amna; **Irsa Ghazal – Ullu Baraye Farokht Nahi** as Aapi; Sania Saeed – Aseerzadi as Bari Sarkar; Sohail Ahmed – Ullu Baraye Farokht Nahi as Chachajee
Best Television Sensation Male	Best Television Sensation Female
**Ali Rehman Khan – Rishtay Kuch Adhooray Se** as Arsal	**Sanam Jung –Dil-e-Muztar** as Silah
Best Onscreen Couple	Best Original Soundtrack
**Fawad Khan and Sanam Saeed – Zindagi Gulzar Hai** as Zaroon and Kashaf; Imran Abbas Naqvi and Sanam Jung – Dil-e-Muztar as Adil and Silah; Fahad Mustafa and Sanam Baloch – Kankar as Sikandar and Kiran	**"Dil-e-Muztar" from Dil-e-Muztar – Alycia Dias**; "Jalta Asman Sulagti Zamin" from Mujhe Khuda Pe Yaqeen Hai – Shariar Tiwana; "Zindagi Gulzar Hai" from Zindagi Gulzar Hai - Ali Zafar; "Mil Gae Dukh Se Rehaai" from Rehaai – Tahira Syed & Roshana Fayaz; "Reet Riwaj Ke Zewar Hain Ye" from Aseerzadi – Fariha Pervez & Sherry Raza; "Kabhi Ashna Kabhi Ajnabi" from Humnasheen – Rekha Bhardwaj
Popular or Viewers Choice Categories
Best Drama Serial Popular	Best Onscreen Couple Popular
**Momina Duraid for MD Productions – Zindagi Gulzar Hai**; Momina Duraid for MD Productions – Dil-e-Muztar; Momina Duraid for MD Productions – Aseerzadi; Momina Duraid for MD Productions – Humnasheen; Humayun Saeed and Shahzad Nasib for Six Sigma Entertainment – Kankar; Noman Masood for MD Productions – Ullu Baraye Farokht Nahi; Momina Duraid for MD Productions – Rehaai; Momina Duraid for MD Productions – Rishtay Kuch Adhoray Se; Barkat Siddiqui for MD Productions – Mujhe Khuda Pe Yaqeen Hai	**Fawad Khan and Sanam Saeed – Zindagi Gulzar Hai** as Zaroon and Kashaf; Imran Abbas Naqvi and Sanam Jung – Dil-e-Muztar as Adil and Silah; Fahad Mustafa and Sanam Baloch – Kankar as Sikandar and Kiran
Best Actor Popular	Best Actress Popular
**Fawad Khan – Zindagi Gulzar Hai** as Zaroon; Noman Ejaz – Rehaai as Akram; Ahsan Khan – Mujhe Khuda Pe Yaqeen Hai as Arham; Adnan Siddiqui – Humnasheen as Munir; Mikaal Zulfiqar – Mujhe Khuda Pe Yaqeen Hai as Shaiq; Imran Abbas Naqvi – Dil-e-Muztar as Adil; Fahad Mustafa – Kankar as Sikandar	**Sanam Saeed – Zindagi Gulzar Hai** as Kashaf; Sanam Jung – Dil-e-Muztar as Silah; Sania Saeed – Aseerzadi as Bari Sarkarni; Saba Qamar – Ullu Baraye Farokht Nahi as Gul-e-Rana; Yumna Zaidi – Rishtay Kuch Adhooray Se as Kiran; Sanam Baloch – Kankar as Kiran; Samina Peerzada – Rehaai as Shameem Beghum

==== Music ====
Viewers Choice Categories
Best Solo Artist	Best Music Video
**Sajjad Ali – "Hur Zulm"**; Bilal Khan – "Do Gharee"; Abbas Ali Khan – "Bolay"; Falak - "Mujh Mian Hai Tu"; Farhan Saeed – "Kyun Gae"	**"Main Sufi Huoon" – Adnan Kandhar**; "Kyun Gae" – Usman Mukhtar; "Waikh Bandya" – Taimoor Mirza; "Bolay" – Natasha Ejaz and Yasir Jaswal
Best Music Band
**Overload – Farhad Humayun, Sheraz Siddiqui and Nasir Sain**; SYMT – Haroon Shahid, Hassan Omer and Farhan Ali; Jal – Goher Mumtaz; The Sketches – Saif Samejo and Naeem Shah

==== Fashion ====
Viewers Choice Categories
Best Model Male	Best Model Female
**Jahan-e-Khalid**; Abbas Jafri; Muhammad Mubarik Ali; Rizwan Ali Jaffri; Omer Shahzad; Shahzad Noor	**Amna Ilyas**; Ayyan; Rabia Butt; Fouzia Aman; Saima Azhar
Best Designer Menswear	Best Designer Womenswear
**Ismail Fareed – Ismail Farid**; Amir Adnan – Amir Adnan; Emran Rajput – ԐR-EMRAAN RAJPUT; Humayun Alamgir – ER; Ahmed Bham – AB-ΛHMED BHΛM	**Hassan Sheheryar Yasin – HSY**; Sana Safinaz – SANA SAFINAZ; Deepak Perwani – DP-Deepak Perwani; Kamiar Rokni – ΚK; Rizwan Baig – Rizwan BAIG

=== Honorary Hum Awards ===
The Hum presented its honorary awards during the ceremony by holding the tradition of honoring the extravagant works of artists across the country. During the ceremony two Hum Honorary Awards and Lifetime Achievement Award were presented.

==== Hum Honorary Lifetime Achievement Award ====
- Zia Mohyeddin

==== Hum Honorary Award in Television ====
- Bushra Ansari

==== Hum Honorary Special recognition ====
Special Hum trophies were presented by Hum Television Network and Entertainment Channel to Bilal Lashari and Humayun Saeed for their record breaking success of films which helps the revival of Pakistani Cinema after a period.

- Bilal Lashari – Waar
- Humayun Saeed – Main Hoon Shahid Afridi

=== Dramas with multiple nominations and awards ===
The following 14 dramas received multiple nominations:

Nominations	Drama
13	Aseerzadi
13	Dil-e-Muztar
13	Zindagi Gulzar Hai
12	Rehaai
11	Ullu Baraye Farokht Nahi
10	Humnasheen
10	Kankar
8	Rishtey Kuch Adhorey Say
8	Mujhe Khuda Pe Yaqeen Hai
4	Ek Pagal Si Larki
4	Mein Hari Piya
4	Ishq Humari Galiyoon Main
4	Chubhan
2	Kadurat

The following four dramas received multiple awards:

Awards	Drama
9	Zindagi Gulzar Hai
3	Aseerzadi
2	Dil-e-Muztar
2	Ek Pagal Si Larki

== Presenters and performers ==
=== Presenters (in order of appearance) ===
The following individuals were chosen to present awards:

Name(s)	Presented
Imran Momina; Gia Ali	Presenters of the award of Best Music Band.
Alamgir Shah; Ayesha Omer	Presenters of the award of Best Solo Artist and Best Original Soundtrack
Faakhir Mehmood; Amna Ilyas	Presenters of the awards of Best Music Video.
Samina Peerzada	Presenters of the award of special recognition to Bilal Lashari and Humayun Saeed for their incredible success of ground breaking films.
Tapu Javeri; Nabila	Presenters of the award of Best Designer Womenswear
Ali Xeeshan; Saba Ansari	Presenters of the award of Best Designer Menswear
Shahbaz Khan; Nadia Hussain	Presenters of the awards of Best Model Male & Best Model Female
Wiqar Ali Khan; Sarwat Gillani	Presenters of the award of Best Sitcom
Shehroz Sabswari; Syra Yousuf	Presenters of the award s of Best Television Sensation Male & Best Television Sensation Female
Farhan Ali Agha; Savera Nadeem	Presenters of the awards of Hum Best Soap Actor & Hum Best Soap Actress
Deepak Perwani; Misbah Khalid	Presenters of the award of Best Soap Series
Sultana Siddiqui	Presented Lifetime Achievement Award to Zia Mohyeddin
Mahira Khan	Presenters of the award of Best Telefilm
Ahsan Khan; Maria Wasti	Presenters of the award of Best Supporting Actress
Angeline Malik; Noor Hassan Rizvi	Presenters of the award of Best Supporting Actor
Ejaz Aslam; Sadia Imam	Presenters of the award of Best Actor in a Negative Role
Hina Dilpazeer; Noor Hassan Rizvi	Presenters of the award of Best Impactful Character
Azfar Ali; Naveen Waqar	Presenters of the Award of Best Onscreen Couple Viewers Choice
Behroze Sabzwari; Shagufta Ejaz	Presenters of the Award of Best Drama Serial Viewers Choice
Moammar Rana; Maria Wasti	Presenters of the Award of Best Actress Viewers Choice
Atiqa Odho	Presenters of the Award of Best Actor Viewers Choice
Sameera Fazal; Seema Ghazal	Presenters of the Award of Best Writer Drama Serial
Sarmad Sultan Khoosat; Sabiha Sumar	Presenters of the Award of Best Director Drama Serial
Hamza Ali Abbasi; Saba Qamar	Presenters of the Award of Best Onscreen Couple
Asim Raza; Zeba Bakhtiar	Presenters of the Award of Best Drama Serial
Humayun Saeed; Umair Mustafa	Presenters of the Award of Best Actress
Vaneeza Ahmad; Farooq Haider Sheikh	Presenters of the Award of Best Actor

=== Performers ===
The following individuals were chosen to perform musical numbers:

Name(s)	Role	Performed
Javed Sheikh; Bushra Ansari	Performer	Both performed a dance number on a medley of "Gari Ko Chalana"
Ahsan Khan (actor); Mehwish Hayat	Performer	Performed on Bollywood songs '"Tu Ney Mari Ebtry Yaar" from Gunday, "Kamli" from Dhoom 3, and "Mere Maat Mari" from R... Rajkumar.
Tanura Dance Group	Traditional Egyptian Dance Form	Egyptian Tanura Dancer Hamada and his troupe performed
Shehroz Sabswari and Sohai Ali Abro	Performer	Performed on a Bollywood number "Malang Malang" from Dhoom 3, "Gun Gunna Re" from Agneepath and "Gandi Baat" from R... Rajkumar.
Noor Bukhari	Performer	Performed on a medley of "Humari Araiya".
Rahat Fateh Ali Khan	Singer	Performed his own musical number.

== See also ==
- 12th Lux Style Awards
- 4th Pakistan Media Awards
