= Kahin Chand Na Sharma Jaye =

- Also known as: Yeh Phool Sa Naazuk Chehra
- Genre: comedy
- Written by: Muhammad Ahmad
- Directed by: Siraj-ul-Haque
- Starring: Sanam Saeed; Nausheen Shah
- Country of origin: Pakistan
- No. of episodes: 1

Production
- Producer: Momina Duraid
- Production company: MD Productions

Original release
- Network: Hum TV
- Release: 2013

Kahin Chand Na Sharma Jaye (Urdu: کہیں چاند نہ شرما جاے , lit. 'Lest it Makes the Moon Blush') is a Pakistani comedy telefilm which is originally broadcast in Pakistan by Hum TV on the occasion of Eid-ul-Fitr in 2013. Sanam Saeed plays a double role in it.

It was also telecast in India by Zindagi Channel on 11 January 2015 under the title Yeh Phool Sa Naazuk Chehra. It could not be broadcast in India with the same name due to copyright issues. Due to Sanam Saeed's popularity in India, the telefilm aired again on Zee Zindagi under the title Teletime on 15 November 2015, along with other hit telefilms like Behadd and Main Kukkoo Aur woh.

Zindagi TV gave the film the title of Double Trouble.

== Cast ==
- Sanam Saeed as Mishal (Salman's wife) / Sameer (Mishal's brother)
- Gohar Mumtaz as Salman
- Nausheen Shah

== Music ==
The telefilm had only one song, "Yeh Phool Sa Nazuk Chehra", which was played a number of times throughout the film.

As Zee Zindagi could not use the telefilm's original name, they decided to change its name to the name of this song.

The song was sung by Omair Alam of Taraaz Band.

== Promotion ==
For the promotion of the film the main cast posted videos of the promo as well as the title cards on social networking sites. Hum TV showed promos on the channel and its Facebook page. Even one of Sanam Saeed's most successful dramas, Zindagi Gulzar Hai, promoted the telefilm on its Facebook page.

== See also ==
- 2013 in Pakistani television
- List of programs broadcast by Hum TV
- List of programmes broadcast by Zindagi TV
