= Zard Mausam =

Pakistani TV series (2012)

- Genre: Romance; Drama
- Based on: Zard Mausam by Rahat Jabeen
- Written by: Rahat Jabeen
- Directed by: Aabis Raza
- Starring: Sania Saeed; Faisal Rehman; Ayeza Khan; Sajida Syed; Mohib Mirza; Ubaida Ansari; Jahanara Hai
- Theme music composer: shabl
- Opening theme: Zard Mausam: Lyrics Nadeem Asad; Singer Rajab All Khan
- Country of origin: Pakistan
- Original language: Urdu

Production
- Producer: Momina Duraid
- Cinematography: Shahzad Kashmiri
- Editors: Safeer Jaffri; Afzal Fayyaz

Original release
- Network: Hum TV
- Release: 3 May – 11 October 2012

Zard Mausam (Urdu: زرد موسم) is a Pakistani drama serial directed by Aabis Raza, based on the Urdu novel Zard Mausam written by Rahat Jabeen and produced by Momina Duraid. It began airing from 3 May 2012 on Hum TV. Zard Mausam is the story of an arrogant girl, Aiman, whose life changes after her mother's death.

It aired in India on Zindagi, titled as Suno ik Kahani Badi Purani.

== Plot ==
After her mother's death, Aiman is mistreated by her stepmother, and even a reunion with her grandfather does not bring her the happiness she had hoped for.

Aiman is engaged to Affan, but she falls in love with her cousin, Tahir Mehmood. Her father gets her married to his junior colleague Tariq. She continues loving Tahir who is interested only in her wealth. There is another kind person in the story called Shahmir, he saves Aiman from Tahir. On learning the truth, Aiman tells her husband about Tahir, upon which he divorces her.

In the end, Aiman marries Shahmir.

== Cast ==
- Sania Saeed as Mehrunnisa "Mehru"
- Faisal Rehman as Waqar ul Hasan
- Ayesha Khan as Mehru's mother
- Mohib Mirza as Tahir Mehmood
- Ayeza Khan as Aiman
- Yasir Shoro as Babar
- Maheen Rizvi as Momal "Momo"
- Anum Fayyaz as Birjees "Jojo"
- Jahanara Hai as Waqar's mother
- Ubaida Ansari as Khadija Bi
- Amir Qureshi as Tariq
- Arisha Razi as Momo (young)
- Agha Shairaz as Ateeq
- Manzoor Qureshi as Aiman's grandfather
- Hassan Ahmed as Shahmir

== Production ==
=== Casting ===
Faysal Quraishi was first approached to play the role of Waqar ul Hasan, but after his rejection Faisal Rehman played the role. Sania Saeed was selected to portray Mehrunnisa, marking her second appearance with Rehman as a couple after Khamoshiyaan (2009).

== Reception ==
A reviewer from Dawn added it among the best serials of 2012, and praised Saeed's performance. while reviewing it, TV Kahani praised Saeed's performance and direction, but criticized the writing and slow pace of the series.
