= Dil Mera Dharkan Teri =

Dil Mera Dharkan Teri may refer to:

- Dil Mera Dharkan Teri (2013 film), a 2013 Pakistani romantic drama
- Dil Mera Dharkan Teri (1968 film), a Pakistani Urdu-language musical romance film
