= Ek Jhooti Kahani =

2025 Pakistani television series

- Genre: Romantic comedy; Family drama
- Written by: Amna Mufti
- Directed by: Shehrazade Sheikh
- Starring: Mohib Mirza; Zara Noor Abbas
- Country of origin: Pakistan
- Original language: Urdu

Production
- Producer: Momina Duraid
- Production company: Momina Duraid Productions

Original release
- Network: Hum TV
- Release: July 22, 2025

Ek Jhooti Kahani is a Pakistani television series written by Amna Mufti and directed by Shehrazade Sheikh. Produced by Momina Duraid, the series stars Mohib Mirza and Zara Noor Abbas in the lead roles. It premiered on Hum TV in July 2025.

== Plot ==
The story follows Irfan, a man who assumes responsibility for his five sisters after the death of their parents. Their difficult behaviour makes it challenging for him to maintain order in the household, particularly when his attempts to arrange a marriage repeatedly encounter obstacles.

Meanwhile, Bushra is an aspiring actress who wants to pursue formal training in theatre but lacks the financial resources to do so. When their paths cross, Irfan offers her one million rupees in exchange for pretending to be his wife and living with his family for a month.

Bushra accepts the proposal, viewing it as an opportunity to finance her ambitions. Her arrival disrupts the established household dynamics, particularly her interactions with Irfan's sisters. As the arrangement continues, the relationship between Irfan and Bushra develops beyond its original purpose.

== Cast ==
- Mohib Mirza as Irfan
- Zara Noor Abbas as Bushra
- Syed Muhammad Ahmed as Habib Sahab
- Uzma Beg as Safiya
- Qudsia Ali as Nasira
- Amna Youzasaif as Bindiya
- Sabeena Syed as Samiya
- Laiba Shah
- Nawal Pervaiz Malik
- Kaif Ghaznavi
- Behroze Sabzwari
- Taimoor Akbar
- Hamza Tariq Jamil
- Haider Shah

== Production ==
Zara Noor Abbas was first offered the female lead but she declined the part due to the birth of her daughter. Sanam Saeed was then approached, but she passed; first because of her baby, and later due to scheduling conflicts with ARY’s Main Manto Nahi Hoon. Ahsan Khan was offered the male lead around the same time but also declined due to scheduling conflicts. The project eventually returned to Zara Noor Abbas, who accepted it, while Khan was replaced by Mohib Mirza.

Amna Mufti wrote the script of the serial, who termed it as a social satire. The series was directed by Shehrazade Sheikh of Dil-e-Momin fame, and marked Abbas' return to television following her pregrancy and subsequent birth of her daughter.

== Reception ==
The series received mixed to negative critical assessments. In a review published by Dawn in January 2026, Amber Javed Malik described Ek Jhooti Kahani as tedious and criticised its clichéd premise, forced comedy and slow pacing. The review noted that the performances of the lead cast could not compensate for weaknesses in the writing and storytelling.

In a review published in August 2025, Youlin Magazine discussed the series' staged-marriage premise, performances and portrayal of domestic relationships. The review praised the lead performances while identifying weaknesses in the development of some supporting characters and the execution of the comedy.
