= Barzakh (TV series) =

- Also known as: برزخ
- Genre: Fantasy; Drama; Mystery
- Created by: Asim Abbasi
- Written by: Asim Abbasi
- Directed by: Asim Abbasi
- Starring: Fawad Khan; Sanam Saeed; Salman Shahid
- Country of origin: Pakistan
- Original language: Urdu
- No. of seasons: 1
- No. of episodes: 6

Production
- Executive producer: Shailja Kejriwal
- Producers: Shailja Kejriwal; Waqas Hassan
- Cinematography: Mo Azmi

Original release
- Network: Zindagi
- Release: 19 July – 6 August 2024

Barzakh (Urdu: برزخ, lit. 'Purgatory') is a 2024 Pakistani fantasy drama television series directed and written by Asim Abbasi. The series stars Fawad Khan and Sanam Saeed in lead roles. The six-episode series which premiered on 19 July 2024 was produced by Waqas Hassan and Shailja Kejriwal for Zindagi.

== Cast ==
- Fawad Khan as Shehryar
- Sanam Saeed as Scheherezade
- Salman Shahid as Jafar Khanzada; Afroz's and Firdaus's husband; Mahtab's lover
  - Khushhal Khan as young Jafar Khanzada
- Faiza Gillani as Tasleem
- Eman Suleman as Leena
- Anika Zulfikar as Mahtab
- Sajid Hassan as Jabbar
- Muhammad Fawad Khan as Saifullah
- Uzma Beg as Afroz; Jafar's second wife; Shehryar mother
- Nighat Chaudhary as Firdaus: Jafar's first wife; Saifullah's mother

== Production ==
The Pakistani and Indian co-produced series was first announced in December 2021. After the 2013 series Zindagi Gulzar Hai, Fawad Khan and Sanam Saeed were announced as the leads under Asim Abbasi's directorial to mark their second on-screen appearance.

On 16 June 2024, the network ZEE5 announced the release date of the series.

== Release ==
Its first episode premiered on 19 July 2024 on Zee5 and the YouTube channel of Zee Zindagi.

== Reception ==
=== Critical response ===
Shilajit Mitra of The Hindu praised Barzakh for its "achingly, unabashedly artful" approach, noting how it intertwines past and present through its characters' stories. He highlighted Fawad Khan’s portrayal of Shehryar, mentioning his "wintry handsomeness with a comic cynicism." However, Mitra criticized the series for losing its "sustained mysticism" in a "psychedelic freak-out" sequence.

Hafsah Sarfraz of DAWN Images commended the series' high production value and storytelling, highlighting the stunning visuals of the Hunza Valley and the strong performances of Fawad Khan, Sanam Saeed, and Salman Shahid. She described the series as having "the right levels of lighting, colours and hues to such perfection." Conversely, Mahwash Ajaz of Khaleej Times appreciated the artistic ambition and beautiful cinematography, describing the frames as "like Renaissance paintings coming alive." She praised Fawad Khan's performance but criticized the pacing and overuse of allegories, noting the series' slow pace akin to "live theater" and hoping for more cohesion in future episodes.

=== Backlash ===
Within two weeks of its release, Barzakh received severe criticism over its LGBTQ-themed content from its viewers in Pakistan. The homosexual love angle was not taken lightly by the audience and it was decided by the production to remove the series from YouTube. An official statement was issued to remove Barzakh from YouTube Pakistan on 9 August 2024.
