= Deedan =

2018 Pakistani television series

- دیدن
- Written by: Attiya Dawood
- Directed by: Amin Iqbal
- Starring: Sanam Saeed; Mohib Mirza
- Country of origin: Pakistan
- Original language: Urdu
- No. of episodes: 29

Production
- Producer: Sarfaraz Ashraf
- Production locations: Hunza Valley; Gilgit-Baltistan
- Camera setup: Multi-camera setup
- Production company: 9th Degree Entertainment

Original release
- Network: A-Plus TV
- Release: 13 October 2018 – 27 April 2019

Deedan (Urdu: دیدن) is a Pakistani television drama series written by Attiya Dawood and directed by Amin Iqbal. It stars Sanam Saeed and Mohib Mirza in lead roles. It premiered in October 2018 on A-Plus Entertainment.

It marks the third on-screen appearance of Sanam and Mohib after Firaaq (TV series) and Lollywood film Bachaana (2016).

== Cast ==
=== Main ===
- Sanam Saeed as Resham
- Mohib Mirza as Zardaab

=== Recurring ===
- Minsa Malik
- Huma Nawab as Gul Makai
- Laila Zain
- Ajab Gul
- Rasheed Naz
- Tipu Sharif
- Sarfraz Asharaf
- Tariq Jamal
- Ishrat Abbas
- Jamal Afridi

== Production ==
Speaking to The News International director Amin Iqbal said, "I have tried to convey a lot of important theme through Deedan and I wish it leaves some impact and resonates well with viewers".
