= Z Living =

American digital cable and satellite television network

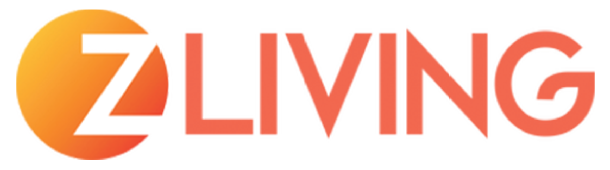
- Country: United States
- Broadcast area: Nationwide
- Headquarters: New York City, New York, U.S.

Programming
- Language: English
- Picture format: 1080i (HDTV); 480i (SDTV)

Ownership
- Owner: NIA Broadcasting, Inc.

History
- Launched: October 2, 2007; 19 years ago (cable/satellite); 2025; 1 year ago (OTA)
- Closed: October 24, 2025 (cable/satellite)
- Former names: Veria Living (2007–2014)

Z Living (formerly Veria Living) is an American digital multicast television network and former digital cable and satellite television network. The channel previously focused on health and wellness programming, but after a 2020 ownership change from Essel Group to NIA Broadcasting (owned by former Equity Media Holdings and Luken Communications executive Neal Ardman), the network shifted focus to classic TV series (much of it shared by family-oriented sister network Binge TV, formerly FOLK TV) and low-profile contemporary entertainment and lifestyle programming from independent producers.

In October 2018 plans to discontinue its linear channel in January 2019 were announced. Z Living was revived in 2025 as an over-the-air television network and is available in select television markets in the United States. The channel terminated its remaining carriage on pay TV providers on October 24, 2025.

== Programming ==
=== Current ===
- 21 Jump Street
- Acapulco H.E.A.T.
- The Adventures of Ozzie & Harriet
- Annie Oakley
- The Beverly Hillbillies
- Bonanza
- The Carol Burnett Show
- The Commish
- Conan the Adventurer
- Daily Flash
- Danger Man
- Fish the Dish
- Four Star Playhouse
- Havin' a Beer with Mike
- Hunter
- I Married Joan
- The Jim Bakker Show
- Josh Lambo's Rona Workouts
- Live with Martin Gramatica and Rock Riley
- The Lucy Show
- My Little Margie
- Mystery Science Theater 3000
- Namaste Yoga
- Nashville Insider
- Petticoat Junction
- The Red Skelton Show
- Renegade
- Route 66
- The Saint
- Silk Stalkings
- Space: 1999
- Tarzan
- Tarzan: The Epic Adventures
- Wiseguy

=== Former ===
- Altar'd
- Bedside Manor
- The Big Fat Truth
- Birth Days
- Cook Like a Chef
- Championship Wrestling from Hollywood
- Chasing the Yum
- Desperate for a Miracle
- The Doctors
- The Dr. Oz Show
- Dueling Doctors
- Empty Nesters
- Family Food Challenge
- Family Style with Chef Jeff
- Flip My Food
- Good Food America
- Health Soup
- Hemsley+Hemsley
- I Beat the Odds
- Junk Brothers
- The Juice
- License to Grill
- The Lisa Oz Show
- Myth Defying with Dr. Holly
- Peggy K's Kitchen Cures
- Nirmala's Spice World
- Naturally Beautiful
- Road Grill
- Rock Your Yoga
- Spencer's Big 30
- Sweat the City
- Urban Vegetarian
- Workout From Within with Jeff Halevy
- What Would Julieanna Do?
- Yoga Girls
- Yoga For Life
