= Bachaana =

- Teaser poster
- بچانا
- Directed by: Nasir Khan
- Written by: Saad Azhar
- Produced by: Rizwan Saeed
- Starring: Mohib Mirza; Sanam Saeed; Adeel Hashmi; Rasheed Ali; Acktar Ghi; Jean Paul Jacquin
- Cinematography: Asrad Khan
- Edited by: Sagheer Ahmed; Sami Ullah; Ahsan Sardar
- Music by: Ali Sher
- Production company: Big Film Entertainment
- Distributed by: Hum Films
- Release date: 26 February 2016
- Running time: 115 minutes
- Country: Pakistan
- Language: Urdu
- Budget: Rs. 4 crore (US$140,000)
- Box office: Rs. 10 crore (US$360,000)

Bachaana (Urdu: بچانا, Literally. Save Me) is a 2016 Pakistani romantic thriller film starring Mohib Mirza and Sanam Saeed. It was directed by Nasir Khan and produced by Rizwan Saeed. The film was released worldwide on 26 February 2016 under the production banner Big Film Entertainment.

== Plot ==
A bubbly Indian girl named Aalia (Sanam Saeed) in trouble is forced by circumstances involving her husband Jhangir 'J' (Adeel Hashmi) to place her faith in a Pakistani cab driver, Vicky (Mohib Mirza), who she meets by chance in Mauritius Airport, who then takes it upon himself to make Aalia's safe return to India possible. Along the way, the two find themselves in a whirlwind of doubt, narcotics, illegally fast driving, secrets and of course, romance.

== Cast ==
- Mohib Mirza as Waqar "Vicky"
- Sanam Saeed as Aalia
- Adeel Hashmi as Jahangir "Jay"
- Rasheed Ali
- Acktar Ghi
- Jean Paul Jacquin

== Production ==
=== Development ===
The film was a feature directorial debut of Nasir Khan, who previously directed a documentary titled Made in Pakistan. Rizwan Saeed produced the film through his banner Big Film Entertainment, which starred Sanam Saeed as Aalia, Mohib Mirza as Vicky and some other actors from India and Pakistan including Adeel Hashmi. In May 2015, filming was underway in Mauritius.

Bachaana was originally produced by Rizwan Saeed. Nasir Khan previously directed a documentary titled Made in Pakistan. The project was finalized in 2014 while Development and concept was being planned by the team by past three years, the director on his interview stated “I have been working on this project for over three years and with the release just round the corner, I don't have anything to say, but to wait for people’s response,” while casting and development were carried out in min 2014. The screen play was done by Saad Azhar. The film was filmed in Mauritius, Pakistan and India. Other development crew and song composition was chosen from both Pakistan and India. In mid 2015, Hum TV's head Sultana Siddique came abroad as partner with Big films, regarding the film she stated "We are excited to partner with Big Films for the release of feature film Bachaana under Hum Films banner. HUM Network has always supported new talent and we have great expectations from Nasir and Rizwan. It's a delight to release Sanam Saeed and MohibMirza's feature film as we consider them an integral part of HUM Family she further added, "I hope the audience will enjoy the movie and will keep supporting Pakistani productions. I also request our press and cinema owners to keep encouraging local productions as they have been bearing fruit in last few months. It's an exciting time for people in the film making business and we hope to bring more films with a Pakistani identity in the future. Best of luck to the entire team of Bachaana!". Along with her Rizwan Saeed stated regarding his first direction "Bachaana is a fun and entertaining ride that will leave you asking for more. I am excited for both Sanam Saeed and Mohib Mirza. Their chemistry in the film is something everyone will connect with immediately. Adeel Hashmi is also making an entertaining debut with Bachaana." He further added, "We have partnered with the stalwart of the Pakistani Media Industry Sultana Siddiqui and her team at Hum Films for this venture. They have played an important role in promoting Pakistan's entertainment industry and with Bachaana we look forward to promote it further.” . According to several sources, it was also said that the series is made on the footsteps of Bollywood film, Bajrangi Bhaijan for this the leading character, Mohib Mirza stated, “Bachaana's script was in my email before anyone had even heard about Bajrangi Bhaijaan. So, let me assure you that it has not been inspired by the Indian flick at all.” Neil Sadwelkar Bollywood's post production guru who has worked on films such as Slumdog Millionaire, Bhaag Milkha Bhaag, Omkara, Don & The Reluctant Fundamentalist had this to say about Bachaana, "The trailer of Bachaana looks fantastic. The film looks so fresh and entertaining and judging from the visuals I haven’t seen Mauritius shot this well in a very long time."

=== Casting ===
The production team conducted the largest talent hunt to find actors in the neutral landscape. With eye-catching scenery, music composed by top Pakistani talent, and a new-take on Indo-Pak relations. Casting was mutually done between the producers, Pakistani actor Mohib Mirza best known for his roles in Hum TV shows Meray Dard Ko Jo Zuban Miley, Shehr-e-Zaat and Firaaq was selected to portray the role of Vicky In an interview Mirza spoke "The character I play in 'Bachaana' has been the most entertaining one in my career so far. It was beautiful driving through the exotic island. Acting and being shot in such an environment certainly excited me. But apart from all the fun and performance, the role also demanded strenuous prepping. I underwent physical training and practiced sprinting before the shoot started. I worked with the team for weeks together in finalizing the character’s look, hairstyle, accent, gestures, wardrobe and the minutest of details that would give life to it. It was heartening to see the team enjoy my spontaneity and improvisations for the role". "It is very seldom that you see the energy and synchronicity across the team as we all had. Everyone came very well prepared on the set; script was rehearsed, we barely needed prompting and the shoot flew superbly smooth. Despite being shot beyond borders of India and Pakistan in Mauritius, a joint crew from both the countries seamlessly wrapped the project within the exact committed time,” He further added. As of female lead, the award-winning actress Sanam Saeed who is well known for her roles in shows like Zindagi Gulzar Hai, Dayar-e-Dil, Mera Naseeb and Firaaq was selected to portray the role of an Indian girl named Alia. It was Saeed's film debut in Baachana, when asked if she had bid adieu to television, she stated I can not leave television as it has given me an identity and fame, but it is true that I have not signed any project lately because I have been busy with this film and other projects. It was Actress's first comedy role for which she said “I thoroughly enjoyed the script and Aalia’s character, she was very unlike the roles I had played before. All of us in whatever way we can are wanting to and trying to bridge the gaps and differences between India and Pakistan. We have been die-hard fans of their movies for decades, and now they are enjoying our story telling through the small screens. Our actors are crossing borders and so are our stories now. And that is what I saw in Bachaana, the film is light and easy. I was really enjoying getting in to Aalia’s character with the mannerisms and clothes and diction. I had tons of help and references and advice on authentic Indian girls from the team we were working with. At the end of the day though, Aalia is a south Asian girl that I am very familiar with, whether she be Indian or Pakistani. This is a contemporary easy, breezy, feel good rom com. I’m sure audiences for India and Pakistan will both enjoy this fun zesty story.” 123

=== Filming and Locations ===
After Development and Casting, the series commenced for its shoot. The shoot began in August 2014 in Mauritius. The series was the first film to pack shoot within 35 days, rest of photography was delayed. Bachaana's official poster launch ceremony date conducted on 10 December 2015, across Pakistan. Shooting locations were overseen by the director and cinematographer.

== Release ==
The official trailer of Bachaana was released on 5 January 2016. The film was released in both Indian and Pakistani cinemas on 26 February 2016. Upon release the film mostly received positive reviews.

=== Home media ===
The film have it world TV premiere on 13 September (Eid al-Adha) on the channel Urdu 1.

=== Digital media ===
Bachaana was made available on Amazone prime video for online streaming.

== Accolades ==
Ceremony	Won	Nominated
16th Lux Style Awards		Mohib Mirza – Best Actor; Sanam Saeed – Best Actress
3rd Galaxy Lollywood Awards		Rizwan Saeed – Best Film; Nasir Khan – Best Director; Mohib Mirza – Best Actor in a Leading Role Male; Sanam Saeed – Best Female Debut; Shafqat Amanat Ali – Best Playback Singer Male for "Yaari"; Mohib Mirza and Sanam Saeed – Best On Screen Couple; Larki Larki Hoti Hai – Cinematic Moment Of The Year
47th Nigar Awards	The awards were postponed and did not take place	Mohib Mirza – Best Actor; Sanam Saeed – Best Debut Female

== Soundtrack ==
With promotions, only three soundtracks were released while the others were set release along with the film.

All lyrics are written by Ali sher.

Bachana
No.	Title	Singer(s)	Length
1.	"Mujhe Bachana"	Benny Dayal	TBD
2.	"Yaari"	Shafqat Amanat Ali	TBD
3.	"Koi Labda"	SYMT	TBD
Total length:			TBD

== See also ==
- List of Pakistani films of 2016
