= Maan Jao Naa =

- Urdu: مان جاؤ ناں
- Directed by: Aabis Raza
- Written by: Asma Nabeel; Ahsan Raza Firdousi
- Produced by: Muhammad Khalid Ali
- Starring: Adeel Chaudhry; Elnaaz Norouzi; Ghana Ali
- Cinematography: Asraad Khan
- Edited by: Faisal Hussain
- Music by: Shuja Haider; Asim Raza; Vicky Haider
- Production companies: The Crew Films & Crew Motion Pictures
- Distributed by: Hum Films; Eveready Pictures
- Release date: 2 February 2018
- Running time: 130 mins
- Country: Pakistan
- Language: Urdu
- Box office: est. Rs. 3.16 crore

Maan Jao Naa (Urdu: مان جاؤ ناں, meaning "Believe then!") is a 2018 Pakistani, romantic comedy film, directed by Aabis Raza and produced by Muhammad Khalid Ali. The film is jointly written by Ahsan Raza Firdousi and Asma Nabeel. It stars Elnaaz Norouzi, Adeel Chaudhry and Ghana Ali in leads.

Principal photography took place from January to March 2017. The film was released on 2 February 2018 under the Hum Films banner.

== Cast ==
- Muhammad Ejaz as Faris's father
- Elnaaz Norouzi as Rania
- Adeel Chaudhry as Faris
- Ghana Ali as Selina
- Ayaz Samoo as Asim
- Hajra Yamin as Sara
- Naeem Haq
- Asif Raza Mir as Rania's father
- Asma Abbas as Neelo
- Sabahat Ali Bukhari as Faris's mother

== Release ==
On 21 November 2017 the film had its trailer released online. The film was released in Pakistan on 2 February 2018. World television premier of the movie was held by Geo Entertainment on Eid ul Adha 2018.

=== Critical reception ===
For The Express Tribune, Yusra Jabeen rated the film 3.5 out of 5 stars and said, "Maan Jao Naa is visually pleasing and demands very little of your mental energy." Shafiq Ul Hasan rated only 1.5 stars out of 5 and said, "With storytelling that fails to engage, sloppy performances that fail to impress, and pathetic dialogues backed by forgettable music which fails to entertain, Maan Jao Naa is no less than a disaster." Umair Sohail of Dunya News said, "It is hard to imagine the reason why one would make such a movie." Omair Alavi of VeryFilmi rated 2.5 out of 5 stars and said that the film "fails to impress when it comes to storytelling as whatever happens on the screen used to happen decades ago". Hamza Khalid of HIP commented that it "fails at building characters and drags around for way too long."

== Music ==
Maan Jao Naa

Soundtrack album by various artists
- Released: 4 December 2017
- Genres: Indie Pop, Soundtrack
- Length: 21:40
- Label: Elements Media

No.	Title	Lyrics	Music	Singer(s)	Length
1.	"Rung Laga"	Asma Nabeel, Shuja Haider	Shuja Haider	Asim Azhar, Rasmia Baloch	3:40
2.	"Some Say I'm Sweety"			Vicky Haider	3:54
3.	"Ishq Bekaar" (Traditional Wedding Folk)	Asma Nabeel	Asim Raza, Umair Hassan	Sana Zulfiqar, Asma Abbas, Damia Farooq	4:54
4.	"Dil Be Sabra"			Sehar Gul Khan, Saqib Riaz Ali Khan	5:04
5.	"Chal Para"	Asma Nabeel, Shuja Haider	Shuja Haider	Shuja Haider	4:08
6.	"Bijli"			Vicky Haider
Total length:					21:40
