= Bewafa (TV series) =

Pakistani television series

- Written by: Radain Shah
- Directed by: Aabis Raza
- Starring: Naveen Waqar; Ali Rehman Khan; Ushna Shah; Sajida Syed
- Music by: Background Score: SK Salman Khan; Deniss Tanveer; Sk Studio
- Composer: SK Salman Khan
- Country of origin: Pakistan
- Original language: Urdu
- No. of episodes: 26

Production
- Producers: Fahad Mustafa; Dr. Ali Kazmi
- Camera setup: Multi-camera setup
- Production company: Big Bang Entertainment

Original release
- Network: ARY Digital
- Release: 16 September 2019 – 5 March 2020

Bewafa (Urdu: بے وفا, lit. 'Disloyal') is a 2019 Pakistani romantic drama television series, produced by Fahad Mustafa and Dr. Ali Kazmi under the banner of Big Bang Entertainment, and directed by Aabis Raza. It has Naveen Waqar, Ali Rehman Khan and Ushna Shah in lead roles. It airs Monday evenings on ARY Digital. The serial is based on extra-marital affairs.

== Cast ==
- Naveen Waqar as Kinza
- Ali Rehman Khan as Ahaan
- Ushna Shah as Shireen
- Maira Khan as Sharmeen
- Sajida Syed as Shireen's mother
- Zarmeena Ikram as Nimra
- Laila Zuberi as Ahaan's mother
- Daniyal Khan as Zeeshan
