= Shukk =

Pakistani television series

- Written by: Samira Fazal
- Directed by: Yasir Nawaz
- Opening theme: Agar Shukk Dil Mein Ajaye by Nabeel Shaukat Ali and Alycia Dias
- Country of origin: Pakistan
- Original language: Urdu
- No. of seasons: 1
- No. of episodes: 28

Production
- Producers: Humayun Saeed; Shehzad Naseeb
- Camera setup: Multi-camera setup
- Production company: Six Sigma Plus

Original release
- Network: ARY Digital
- Release: 4 August – 21 September 2014

Shukk, also known as Shak, (Urdu: شک, lit. 'Suspicion') is a 2013 Pakistani television mystery drama, aired on ARY Digital, and directed by Yasir Nawaz. It starred Adeel Hussain, Sanam Saeed and Ayesha Khan in the leading roles while Syed Jibran played a pivotal role. The drama was a big hit and includes in the highest rated Pakistani serials.

== Plot ==
The story revolves around Sehrish and Ehtishaam, a happy couple. Suddenly, Sania, the once fiance of Ehtishaam arrives in their neighborhood.

== Cast ==
- Adeel Hussain as Ehtisham
- Sanam Saeed as Sania
- Ayesha Khan as Sehrish
- Syed Jibran as Ali
- Shamim Hilaly as Sania's aunt
- Badar Khalil as Sania's mother
- Ayesha Khan as Kulsoom
- Meher Jaffri
- Syed Wajdan Shah
- Birjees Farooqui as Sherish's aunt
- Bilal Khan (child star) as roman

== Production ==
The role of Ehtisham was earlier offered to Fawad Khan but due to his ongoing projects in India he rejected it.

== Broadcast ==
The show was also aired in India on Zindagi (TV channel) premiering in January 2016. It also aired on ARY Zindagi.

== Reception ==
=== Critical reception ===
Fatima Majeed of The Express Tribune critiqued the series, implying that it portrays women as dependent on men and unable to survive without them.

In an year-ender poll conducted by the Dawn, the series was voted for "Best camera work critics' choice" and "Best actress - critics' choice" for Ayesha Khan's portrayal.

=== Legacy ===
Khan found Shukk among personal favourite from her own work.

== Accolades ==
- Nominated - 14th Lux Style Awards - Best Television Director - Yasir Nawaz
