= Laila Zuberi =

Pakistani actress

Laila Zuberi لیلیٰ زبیری
- Born: Laila Zuberi; 18 August 1957 (age 68); Karachi, Pakistan
- Occupation: TV actress
- Years active: 1984-present
- Spouse: Tariq Zuberi
- Children: 2

Laila Zuberi (born 18 August 1957) is a Pakistani TV actress who has worked in many drama series and also appeared in the 2016 film Teri Meri Love Story. She was among the most popular and successful actresses of the 1980s and 1990s.

== Early life ==
Laila Zuberi was born on 18 August 1957, in Karachi.

== Career ==
Laila Zuberi started her career as a radio artist. Then in the 1980s, she came to television with dramas like, "Chhayon" (1984) and "Koshish" (1985). Since then, she has established herself as a TV actress through a number of television series. She appeared in the Geo TV show "Annie Ki Ayegi Barat" in 2012. She also appeared in another popular Hum TV drama, "Durr-e-Shehwar" in the same year. She also had an appearance in the Hum TV show "Kankar Shaista" in 2013. In 2014, she appeared in the film "Mohabbat Ab Nahin Hogi" in which she played a mother. The serial was broadcast on Hum TV. She also worked on "Laa", another Hum TV project, in the same year. In 2015, she gave another appearance as Ghazala's mother in the film "Jugnoo". The serial was broadcast on Hum TV. She also appeared in the 2016 film "Man Mayal". Laila Zuberi also appeared in "Sila" and the most-watched television serial "Udaari" in the same year. In 2017, she appeared in films such as "Aashna", "Baaghi", and others that are worth mentioning.

She is currently appearing in the serial "Sabaat," which stars Sarah Khan, Usama Khalid, Mawra Hussain, and others.

She has recently appeared in web series The Ending featuring Hassan Niazi, Faizan Shaikh, Haseeb Abbasi

== Personal life ==
She is married to her cousin, Tariq Zuberi. Both have two daughters.

== Filmography ==
=== Television ===
Year	Serial	Role	Channel
1984	Aabroo	Hameeda	PTV
1984	Chhaon	Saira	PTV
1985	Koshish	Zaib	PTV
1991	Guest House	Zebunnisa Alam	PTV
2009	Tere pehlu main		Geo TV
2011	Jeena Tu Hai		PTV Home
2012	Annie Ki Ayegi Baraat		Geo TV
2012	Durr-e-Shehwar	Mrs. Habib	Hum TV
2012–13	Mera Pehla Pyar	Amna	ARY Digital
2013	Kankar	Shaista	Hum TV
2014	Laa		Hum TV
2014	Bay Emaan Mohabbat	Shagufta	ARY Digital
2014	Muhabbat Ab Nahi Hugi	Arham's mother	Hum TV
2016	Mann Mayal	Rahila	Hum TV
2016	Sila		Hum TV
2015	Jugnoo	Ghazala's mother	Hum TV
2015	Zinda Dargor	Tehmina	ARY Digital
2016	Udaari	Muneera Khalid	Hum TV
2017	Aashna	Erum's mother	Play Entertainment
2016	Bay Khudi	Saabra	ARY Digital
2017	Baaghi	Shehreyar‘s mother	Urdu 1
2018	Pukaar	Samra's mother	ARY Digital
2018	Mah-e-Tamaam	Taqi's Mother	Hum TV
2018	Tajdeed e Wafa		Hum TV
2018	Deedan	Zardaab's mother	A-Plus TV
2018	Maryam Periera		TVOne
2019	Bewafa		ARY Digital
2020	Qurbatain	Zamal's mother	Hum TV
2021	Qissa Meherbano Ka	Safiya	Hum TV
2023	Muhabbat Gumshuda Meri	Sajida	Hum TV
2024	Pagal Khana	Zubaida	Green Entertainment
2024	Tan Man Neel O Neel	Shazia	Hum TV

=== Film ===
Year	Title	Role
2016	Teri Meri Love Story	Baby Aunty

=== Web series ===
Year	Title	Role	Notes
2020	Churails	Tabinda Rafi	Episode 7; released on Zee5

== Awards ==
Laila received Pakistan Excellency Award in 2019.
