= Ishq Hamari Galiyon Mein =

- Also known as: Yeh Galiyan Yeh Chaubara
- Genre: Soap opera: Romance
- Written by: Mustafa Hashmi
- Directed by: Qazi Latif
- Starring: Sidra Batool; Sanam Chaudhry; (For entire cast see the section on cast below)
- Opening theme: Ishq Hari Galiyon Mein by Sara Raza Khan
- Country of origin: Pakistan
- Original language: Urdu
- No. of seasons: 1
- No. of episodes: 101

Production
- Production company: MNM Productions

Original release
- Network: Hum TV
- Release: 12 August 2013 – 6 February 2014

Ishq Hamari Galiyon Mein (Urdu: عشق ہماری گلیوں میں , lit. 'Love in our streets') is a 2013 Pakistani television soap series broadcast on Hum TV.

== Synopsis ==
Rashid is a very conservative man, who does not support women's education. He has two daughters, Falak and Sitara. Despite her father's beliefs, Falak determines to get an education. Her mother, Amna, convinces her father to allow her to get an education. In this way, Falak starts her studies. She goes into the neighbourhood to a professor's house, where she falls for Haroon, the professor’s son. On the other hand, Rashid forces her to marry another boy. She refuses and elopes from her house with Haroon.

== Cast ==
- Sidra Batool as Falak
- Humayun Ashraf as Haroon
- Sanam Chaudhry as Sitara, Falak's Sister
- Yasir Shoro as Saad, Sitara's Husband
- Kashif Mehmood as Rashid, Falak's Father
- Javeria Abbasi as Aamna, Falak's Mother
- Tabbasum Arif as Nuzhat
- Yasir Ali Khan as Awais, Falak's ex-husband
- Salma Qadir as Teacher
- Farah Nadeem as Farzana, Haroon's mother
- Saife Hassan as Saad's father
- Rimal Kazmi (Child Artist) as Haidar

== International broadcast ==
It was telecast on Zindagi TV channel in India under the title, Yeh Galiyan Yeh Chaubara, from 8 December 2014.

== Accolades ==
- 2nd Hum Awards-Best Soap Actor-Humayun Ashraf
- 2nd Hum Awards-Best Soap Actress-Sidra Batool-Nominated
