= Firaaq (TV series) =

- Title screen
- Genre: Drama
- Written by: Mustafa Afridi
- Directed by: Aabis Raza
- Starring: Mohib Mirza; Sanam Saeed; Junaid Khan; Cybil Chaudhry; Noor Hassan Rizvi; Hira Saleem; Uzma Gillani; S. Mazhar Ali
- Theme music composer: Shaibi
- Opening theme: "Sifarish Hai ye dil ki" Rajab Ali Khan
- Composer: Shaibi
- Country of origin: Pakistan
- Original language: Urdu
- No. of episodes: 17

Production
- Producer: Momina Duraid
- Production locations: Panama City, Florida, United States
- Cinematography: Illyas Kashmiri; Haider Raza Arif; Syed Zafar; Nadeem Kasmiri
- Editors: Mehmood Ali; Faisal Saleem; Saqib Qureshi
- Camera setup: Multi-camera setup
- Running time: 35–40 minutes

Original release
- Network: Hum TV
- Release: 6 September – 28 December 2014

Firaaq (Urdu: فراق:دوریاں محبت کا زوال نہیں, lit. 'Separation: Separation is not a Comeuppance of Love') is a 2014 Pakistani family drama television serial. The serial is directed by Aabis Raza, written by Mustafa Afridi, and produced by Momina Duraid. Uzma Gillani, Syed Mazhar Ali, Mohib Mirza, Sanam Saeed, Junaid Khan, Noor Hassan Rizvi, Hira Saleem, and Cybil Chaudhry play the lead roles. Set in the United States, it follows the life of a broken family living in Panama City, Florida, and Paiman who struggles to live according to her own will amid boundaries set by her mother.

== Plot ==
The plot revolves around the story of a broken Pakistani American family settled in Florida, United States. The story is about Paimaan, Imroze, Rumi, Sarah, Shams, and Hareem. Paimaan and Shams are siblings. Their father had died when they were very young. Their mother, whom they call "Maa Jee", marries another man, Haider. At 10 years old, Shams realizes this and leaves the home in anger. Years pass, and Paimaan grows up into a mature, quiet, and depressed girl due to her mother's behavior. Her mother is strict and does not allow her to go anywhere, as she thinks that the atmosphere of America will spoil her, but her stepfather is friendly with her, understands her problems, and advises her to move out. This makes her mother angry, as she believes that he is poisoning her mind. On the other hand, Shams has married a Pakistani girl, Sarah. Sarah is an orphan, and she and Shams love each other, but before they marry, Shams puts a condition that he does not want a child. Sarah agrees, but after a few years of marriage she begins to demand a baby from Shams. Then, she goes to Shams family and meets other. When Shams realises this, he takes Paimaan with him to his house.

== Cast ==
- Uzma Gillani as Maa Jee
- S. Mazhar Ali as Haider
- Mohib Mirza as Imroze
- Sanam Saeed as Paiman
- Junaid Khan as Shams
- Noor Hassan Rizvi as Roomi
- Hira Mani as Hareem
- Cybil Chaudhry as Sara
- Dr. Ismail Zahij
- Kenyon Bozeman
- Malik Qayyum Anwar
- Maik Rose
- Sabrina Rose
- Asleen Nelson
- Faizan
- Hania Ikram
- Muzamil Salman Sheikh

== Production ==
=== Background and development ===
The story was written by Mustafa Afridi. It was the second serial of Hum Television that was shot in the same place outside of the country, as the first being was Vasl. It marked the second appearance of Junaid Khan and Sanam Saeed together after Mata-e-Jaan Hai Tu, where he plays Sanam's abusive husband. Model turned actress, Cybil marks his debut in acting with this serial. Veteran actor Syed Mazhar Ali returns to TV after a massive heart attack, and Uzma Gillani also appears on Hum TV after a long time.

=== Filming and promotion ===
The serial was shot mostly in Panama City, Florida, in the United States, with some portion also taking place in Pakistan. Production and shooting began between May and June. Principal photography started in mid-July and finished in mid-August, with other editing processes.

The first teaser trailer was released on 24 August 2014, and OST of the drama serial was released on 29 August 2014.

=== Broadcast ===
On 14 December 2014, Firaaq began to broadcast on Sundays at 8 pm – 10:20 pm (PST) instead of on Saturdays at 8 pm – 9:10 pm (PST). Its last episode aired on Sunday, 28 December 2014 at 8 pm.

== Original soundtrack ==
Firaaq: Original Soundtrack (OST)

Soundtrack album by Rajab Ali Khan
- Released: 27 August 2014
- Recorded: 2013
- Genres: Theme song, Television soundtrack
- Length: 1:48
- Language: Urdu
- Label: M.D Productions
- Producer: Momina Duraid

The Theme song of Firaaq is its original soundtrack, written by Azal Band and Abis Raza the director of serial, and composed by Shebi. The music is a label of Momina Duraid Productions. The song is sung by Razab Ali.

=== Track listing ===
All lyrics are written by Azal Band and ABis Raza; all music is composed by Shaibi.

No.	Title	Artist(s)	Length
1.	""Firaaq""	Rajab Ali Khan	1:48

== See also ==
- List of Pakistani actresses
- List of Pakistani actors
- List of Pakistani television serials
