= Kadoorat =

- Kadoorat intertitle
- Also known as: Ranjish
- Genre: Mystery
- Written by: Zoha Hassan
- Directed by: Aabis Raza
- Starring: Sanam Saeed; Deepak Perwani; Angeline Malik; Imran Aslam; Momal Sheikh; Junaid Khan; Hira Pervaiz
- Country of origin: Pakistan
- Original language: Urdu
- No. of seasons: 1
- No. of episodes: 18

Production
- Producer: Momina Duraid
- Camera setup: Single-camera setup

Original release
- Network: HumTV
- Release: 17 July – 20 November 2013

Kadoorat (English: Hate; Urdu: کدورت) is a 2013 Pakistani mystery television series produced by Momina Duraid. It is written by Zoha Hassan and directed by Aabis Raza. Kadoorat premiered on Hum TV on 17 July 2013.

== Synopsis ==
Kadoorat is the story of a girl, Minah (Sanam Saeed), whose mother dies in a car accident when she is eight. Her father remarries to Atiqa (Angeline Malik), a mother of two. Minah’s father has married Atiqa so that she can take care of his child along with her two children. But Minah cannot accept them as her new family, so she creates problems for her step-family. In return, her father sends her to a hostel. The heartbroken Minah can think of nothing but vengeance from her father and his new family. After some years, when she returns home after completing her education, she deliberately tries to create problems for the family. She takes help from Shaheen (Nida Khan), her friend who secretly envies her for her money. With Shaheen's help, she jeopardises the lives of everyone around her, only to be fooled and trapped by Shaheen. This opens her eyes as her family stands by her. She seeks forgiveness from her family and tries to right all her wrongs.

== Cast ==
- Sanam Saeed as Minah
- Zhalay Sarhadi as Minah's Mom
- Deepak Perwani as Mahmud
- Imran Aslam as Asad
- Momal Sheikh as Alina
- Angeline Malik as Atiqa
- Junaid Khan as Daniyal
- Hira Pervaiz as Aasma
- Nida Khan as Shaheen
- Sohail Hashmi as Daniyal's father
- Seemi Pasha as Daniyal's mother
- Adnan Jaffar as Dr.Zohaib
- Muneeb Butt as Adnan

== Broadcast and release ==
The show was broadcast in India on Zindagi from 27 March 2015 Monday – Saturday 10:00 pm under the title Ranjish. It ended its run on 1 May 2015. It was aired on MBC Bollywood in Arab world under the title مرآة ذات وجهين. It was released on MX Player app to stream online.

== Reception ==
=== Critical reception ===
An reviewer from the Firstpost panned the series but praised Saeed's performance stating that the series is "so breathtakingly absurd that even Sanam Saeed finds it a hard slog". In an article by The Express Tribune published in 2024, Saeed's performance as an antagonist was counted among four best performances by her.
