= Sanam Saeed =

Pakistani actress, singer and model (born 1985)

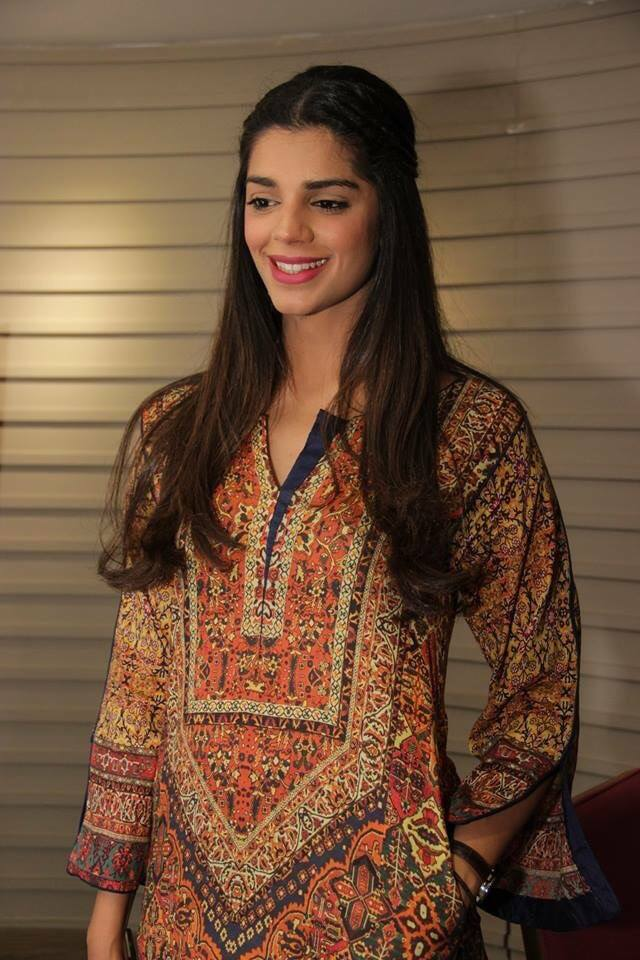
- Saeed on the sets of Diyar-e-Dil in 2015
- Born: 2 February 1985 (age 41); London, England, UK
- Occupation: Actress
- Years active: 2007–present
- Height: 1.75 m (5 ft 9 in)
- Spouses: Farhan Hassan (m. 2015, divorced) Mohib Mirza (m. 2021)
- Children: 1

Sanam Saeed (born 2 February 1985) is a Pakistani actress, singer and former model who predominantly works in Urdu cinema and television.

She is best known for portraying the role of Kashaf Murtaza in Momina Duraid's Zindagi Gulzar Hai, for which she received numerous accolades, including Lux Style Awards for Best Television Actress.

Saeed made her television debut in the 2010 romance Daam. Saeed had her first commercial success with the 2013 romantic television series Zindagi Gulzar Hai. She rose to prominence by featuring as the female lead in several top-grossing series, including Mata-e-Jaan Hai Tu (2013), Talkhiyaan (2013), Zindagi Gulzar Hai (2013) and Kadoorat (2013), Kahin Chand Na Sharma Jaye (2013), Firaaq (2014). She received critical recognition for playing an antagonist in the 2015 family drama Diyar-e-Dil, that earned her a nomination for Best Villain at Hum Awards. Saeed was last seen playing the main protagonist in Deedan (2018) opposite Mohib Mirza, whom she married in 2021.

After establishing herself as a leading actress in television, Saeed made her film debut with the 2016 romantic comedy Bachaana and later appeared in a supporting role in Dobara Phir Se in the same year. Both of which earned her nomination for Best Actress and Best Supporting Actress respectively at Lux Style Awards. Her other film appearances include the biographical drama Mah-e-Mir, the period drama film Rahm (both 2016), the melodrama Azaad (2017) and the family drama Cake (2018). In 2019, Saeed was named "Pride of Pakistan" by Daily Times.

== Early life and education ==
Sanam Saeed was born in London, England, in 1984 or 1985. Her father is a retired interior designer, while her mother was an art teacher. She has a brother and a sister. The multi-ethnic family (her father is a Punjabi while her mother is a Memon) moved back to Karachi in 1990 or 1991.

Saeed did her O-levels at Bay View High School, Karachi and her A-levels at L'Ecole College, also in Karachi. She acted on stage in school plays.

She started modelling at the age of 17; she said that her height, at 5'9", helped. She later said that she had quit modelling because she was becoming increasingly conscious about her looks for the first time in her life. She said it was a "great way to earn money, but [she] never particularly enjoyed it".

== Career ==
=== Live comedy and theatre ===
In 2004 Saeed was a member of Pakistan's first English-speaking improv comedy troupe, Blackfish. Created by Saad Haroon, the troupe represented Pakistan in an international youth theatre festival called "Contacting the World" at Contact Theatre in Manchester, England, in 2004.

Saeed has worked on stage in various types of theatre. She performed in Nida Butt's successful musicals, Chicago (2007), and Mamma Mia! (2009), which required her to sing, act, and dance. In 2010, she joined the Coke Studio entourage as a background vocalist.

She also acted in the stage plays Carnage (2009), Dhaani (2013), and Grease (2013).

=== VJing ===
Saaed became a VJ on the Indus Music channel soon after its launch in 2003.

=== Television ===
Saeed started her acting career with a supporting role in the 2010 ARY Digital serial, Daam, the adaption of Umera Ahmad's novel of the same name, opposite Aamina Sheikh and Sanam Baloch. Directed by Mehreen Jabbar, Saeed played the role of Fiza, a "selfish and arrogant girl" who develops feelings for her sister-in-law's brother, which later become a burden for her.

The following year she played the lead female role in Adnan Ahmed's Hum TV serial Mera Naseeb, along with Syra Yousuf, Imran Aslam and Imran Abbas Naqvi. Her portrayal of Shazia, an outspoken and rebellious girl, was particularly praised.

Saeed followed with the role of Yamina, a British Pakistani who is married to a materialistic snob, a wife beater (played by Junaid Khan) in Mehreen Jabbar's Mata-e-Jaan Hai Tu an adaptation of Farhat Ishtiaq's novel of the same name. Sultana Siddiqui's romantic drama Zindagi Gulzar Hai an adaption of Umera Ahmad's novel of the same name was Saeed's next series. Co-starring Fawad Khan, she was cast as Kashaf Murtaza, a very sensible and mature girl, coming from a middle-class family background. It marked a departure from the glamorous characters that she had a reputation for portraying. The pairing of Saeed with Khan proved a major commercial success, as well as earning her three Best Actress awards.

Saeed played Bibi, a Syrian Christian single mother in Bee Gul's 2013 drama series, Talkhiyan, based on Arundhati Roy's novel The God of Small Things. The series, which was directed by Khalid Ahmed and set in Murree, received positive feedback from the critics and Saeed's performance was especially praised.

Saeed next played opposite Junaid Khan in the 2013 mystery drama Kadoorat, aired on Hum TV from Momina Duraid. Her role was Minah, who took revenge from her stepmother and stepsister and later felt guilty. The same year, she appeared in Geo TV serial Ek Kasak Reh Gaye opposite Mikaal Zulfiqar and ARY Digital's Shukk opposite Adeel Hussain and Ayesha Khan.

Saeed next appeared opposite Ahsan Khan and Sarwat Gilani in the romantic telefilm Dil Mera Dhadkan Teri, her third collaboration with Mehreen Jabbar. The telefilm was the remake of Waheed Murad's 1968 film of the same name. She featured in the role of "a rich and spoiled brat". The telefilm received mixed reviews from critics, but Saeed's performance was praised by both critics and viewers. Saeed also starred in two other Eid special telefilms Kahin Chand Na Sharma Jaye opposite Goher Mumtaz and Tamana ki Tamana opposite Bilal Khan and Mathira. Her only serial of 2014 was the Hum TV serial Firaaq, opposite Mohib Mirza, Noor Hassan Rizvi, and Junaid Khan.

In the highly successful 2015 series Diyar-e-Dil, Saeed portrayed Ruhina Behroze Khan, a young middle-class girl who marries her rich class fellow Behroze Khan (played by Zulfiqar), against his family members and leaves home and gives birth to new rivalry in both families. Directed by Haseeb Hassan, and based on Farhat Ishtiaq's novel of the same name, she was cast alongside Maya Ali, Mikaal Zulfiqar, Osman Khalid Butt, and Abid Ali.

=== Film ===
In 2016, she was seen in four Pakistani films. She made her film debut in Nasir Khan's romantic thriller Bachaana with Mohib Mirza

She next appeared in Anjum Shahzad and Sarmad Sehbai's Mah-e-Meer, along with Fahad Mustafa and Iman Ali, describing it as the first "glamorous" role of her career. She was also seen in Ahmed Jamal's Rahm. She then appeared in Mehreen Jabbar's Dobara Phir Se, alongside Adeel Hussain, Hareem Farooq, Ali Kazmi and Tooba Siddiqui, which earned her an award for Best supporting actress (film) at the 16th Lux Style Awards.

In 2018, she appeared as the younger sister Zara in the critically acclaimed film Cake. Reviewing the film for The Express Tribune, critic Rahul Aijaz appreciates Saeed's extraordinary performance in the film and wrote "Saeed portrays Zara with suppressed emotions, running away from her past. Hers is the journey we try to keep digging into, slowly. The actor's naturally calm exterior and controlled style of speaking aid her project Zara's insecurities".

=== Music ===
Saeed briefly appeared in the third season of Coke Studio Pakistan, where she sang background vocals on "Alif Allah (Jugni)" by Arif Lohar and Meesha Shafi, "Aisha" by Amanat Ali and "Chori Chori" by Meesha Shafi as a backing vocalist.

== Other activities ==
In 2010, Saeed was selected to be the brand spokesperson for the international cosmetics brand L'Oréal Paris, the only one in Karachi.

== Personal life ==
Saeed married her childhood friend, Farhan Hassan, a banker from Karachi, on 2 January 2015. In 2018, Saeed stated that they had divorced.

In 2021, Saeed married actor Mohib Mirza in a private ceremony, and announced their wedding in 2023. Their son, Vali Hasan Mirza, was born in May 2025.

== Filmography ==
=== Films ===
Key
| † | Denotes films that have not yet been released |

| Year | Title | Role | Director | Notes | Ref(s) |
|---|---|---|---|---|---|
| 2016 | Bachaana | Aalia | Nasir Khan | Film Debut | |
| 2016 | Mah-e-Meer | Naina Kanwal | Anjum Shahzad | Based on the life of Mir Taqi Mir | |
| 2016 | Dobara Phir Se | Samar | Mehreen Jabbar | | |
| 2016 | Rahm | Samina | Ahmed Jamal | | |
| 2017 | Azad | Sabreen Hisbani | Rehan Sheikh | Screened at South Asian International Film Festival | |
| 2018 | Cake | Zara | Asim Abbasi | | |
| 2022 | Ishrat Made in China | Akhtar | Mohib Mirza | | |
| 2024 | Umro Ayyar - A New Beginning | Meena | Azfar Jafri | | |
| 2025 | The Martial Artist | Pash | Shaz Khan | | |
| TBA | Aan † | TBA | | Filming | |

=== Television ===
| Year | Title | Role | Notes | Ref(s) |
|---|---|---|---|---|
| 2010 | Daam | Fiza | Debut | |
| 2011 | Mera Naseeb | Shazia | | |
| 2012 | Mata-e-Jaan Hai Tu | Yamina Sajjad | | |
| 2012 | Talkhiyaan | Bibi | | |
| 2012 | Zindagi Gulzar Hai | Kashaf Murtaza | | |
| 2013 | Kadoorat | Minah | | |
| 2013 | Ek Kasak Reh Gayi | Paras | | |
| 2013 | Shukk | Sania | | |
| 2014 | Firaaq | Paimaan | | |
| 2015 | Diyar-e-Dil | Ruhina Behroze Khan | | |
| 2016 | Dil Banjaara | Nida Nafees | | |
| 2018 | Aakhri Station | Tehmina | Mini Series | |
| 2018 | Deedan | Resham | | |
| 2025 | Doosra Chehra | Zara | Mini Series | |
| 2025 | Main Manto Nahin Hoon | Professor Maria Chauhan | Drama Comeback after 8 year hiatus | |
| 2025 | Kafeel | Zeba Jamshed | | |
| 2026 | Gulbahar | Sara Sheheryar | | |

=== Other appearances ===
| Year | Title | Role | Channel | Director | Notes | Ref(s) |
|---|---|---|---|---|---|---|
| 2013 | Dil Mera Dharkan Teri | Beenish | Geo Entertainment | Mehreen Jabbar | Telefilm | |
| 2013 | Kahin Chand Na Sharma Jaye | Mishal / Sameer | Hum TV | Siraj-ul-Haque | Telefilm | |
| 2013 | Tamanna ki Tamanna | Zainab | Hum TV | Siraj-ul-Haque | Telefilm | |
| 2015 | Mr. Shamim | Maya | Hum TV | Hassan Saqib | Sitcom | |
| 2020 | Ab Buss | Maya | SeePrime | Mohsin Talat | Short Film | |
| 2021 | Full Circle | Zehra | Digestive Showtime | Mukhtar Zaidi | Short Film | |

=== Web Series ===
| Year | Title | Role | Platform | Director | Ref(s) |
|---|---|---|---|---|---|
| 2021 | Qatil Haseenaon Ke Naam | Zuvi | Zee5 | Meenu Gaur | |
| 2024 | Barzakh | Scheherezade | Zee5 | Asim Abbasi | |
| TBA | Jo Bachay Hain Sang Samait Lo † | Vittoria Akhtar | Netflix | Momina Duraid | |
| TBA | Shandur † | TBA | SonyLiv | Asim Raza | |

=== Theatre ===
| Year | Theatre Play | Role | Ref(s) |
|---|---|---|---|
| 2007 | Chicago | Roxie Hart | |
| 2009 | Mama Mia | Rosie | |
| 2009 | Carnage | Veronica | |
| 2013 | Grease | Rizz | |
| 2013 | Dhaani | Ruqayya | |

== Discography ==
| Year | Song | Notes | Ref(s) |
|---|---|---|---|
| 2010 | "Alif Allah (Jugni)" | on Coke Studio Pakistan (Season 3) as a backing vocalist | |
| 2010 | "Aisha" | on Coke Studio Pakistan (Season 3) as a backing vocalist | |
| 2010 | "Chori Chori" | on Coke Studio Pakistan (Season 3) as a backing vocalist | |

== Awards and nominations ==
| Year | Award | Category | Work | Result | Ref(s) |
|---|---|---|---|---|---|
| 2012 | L'Oréal Paris Awards | Model of the Year | —N/a | Won | |
| 2013 | Tarang House Full Awards | Best Female In Supporting Role | Dil Mera Dharkan Teri | Won | |
| 2014 | 2nd Hum Awards | Best Actor in a Negative role | Kadoorat | Nominated | |
| 2014 | 2nd Hum Awards | Best Actor Female - Jury | Zindagi Gulzar Hai | Nominated | |
| 2014 | 2nd Hum Awards | Best Actor Female - Popular | Zindagi Gulzar Hai | Won | |
| 2014 | 2nd Hum Awards | Best On-screen Couple - Jury (with Fawad Khan) | Zindagi Gulzar Hai | Won | |
| 2014 | 2nd Hum Awards | Best On-screen Couple - Popular (with Fawad Khan) | Zindagi Gulzar Hai | Won | |
| 2014 | 13th Lux Style Awards | Best Television Actress - Satellite | Zindagi Gulzar Hai | Won | |
| 2016 | 4th Hum Awards | Best Actor in a Negative role | Diyar-e-Dil | Nominated | |
| 2016 | 1st Hum Style Awards | Most Stylish Actress - Film | Dobara Phir Se | Nominated | |
| 2017 | 16th Lux Style Awards | Best Supporting Actress in a Film | Dobara Phir Se | Won | |
| 2017 | 16th Lux Style Awards | Best Actress in a Film | Bachaana | Nominated | |
| 2017 | 3rd Galaxy Lollywood Awards | Best Female Debut | Bachaana | Nominated | |
| 2017 | 3rd Galaxy Lollywood Awards | Best Onscreen Couple (with Mohib Mirza) | Bachaana | Nominated | |
| 2017 | 3rd Galaxy Lollywood Awards | Best Actor in a Supporting Role - Female | Dobara Phir Se | Won | |
| 2017 | 3rd Galaxy Lollywood Awards | Best Performance in a Negative Role | Mah-e-Meer | Nominated | |
| 2017 | Eastern Eye Awards | Best Film Actress | Rahm | Won | |
| 2017 | 2nd Hum Style Awards | Most Stylish Actress - Film | Cake | Won | |
| 2019 | 18th Lux Style Awards | Best Film Actress | Cake | Nominated | |
| 2019 | 5th Galaxy Lollywood Awards | Best Actor in a Supporting Role - Female | Cake | Won | |
| 2026 | 3rd Pakistan International Screen Awards | Best Actress - Film | Umro Ayyar - A New Beginning | Nominated | |
| 2026 | 3rd Sunday Special Icon Awards | Fashion Icon of the year | —N/a | Nominated | |
| 2026 | 3rd Sunday Special Icon Awards | Best Supporting Female of the Year | Main Manto Nahin Hoon | Nominated | |

== Other recognitions ==
| Year | Award | Category | Ref(s) |
|---|---|---|---|
| 2019 | Daily Times | Pride of Pakistan | |
| 2025 | Hello! Hot 100 | Trailblazer | |
