= Aabis Raza =

Pakistani television and film director

- Born: Karachi, Pakistan
- Education: University of Sindh
- Occupations: Television editor; Television director; Film director
- Years active: 2000–present

Aabis Raza is a Pakistani television and film director. He is best known for his work in Urdu-television industry. Raza has been working as a TV director since 2000 and later he made his cinematic debut by directing 2018 rom-com Maan Jao Na.

== Early life ==
After completing his bachelor's degree, Raza started a web development business.

== Career ==
Raza made his debut as filmmaker by directing four plays for Pakistan Arts Council. He started his television career as an editor in 2000. After directing several sitocms, Raza directed Coke, marking his foray into serious subjects. Some of his popular work that also received critical acclaim include Zard Mausam (2012) which was a tragic Cinderella story, Kankar (2013) which focuses on domestic abuse faced by women, and a youth-based family drama Firaaq (2014). In 2015, he directed Nazo which tells the story of an intellectually challenged girl.

In 2019, he directed Khudparast, which deals with the underlying hypocrisy in society, and supernatural horror Bandish; both were commercial as well as critical successes.

In 2020, Raza directed Jalan, the story of an illicit affair of a woman and her brother-in-law, faced extreme negativity and controversy due to its storyline, leading to a temporary ban by Pakistan Electronic Media Regulatory Authority, but after its reinstatement, it gained popularity and topped ratings.

== Notable work ==
=== Film ===
- Maan Jao Na

=== Television series ===
Year	Title	Network	Notes
2011	Mujhay Roothnay Na Daina	Hum TV	
2012	Zard Mausam	Hum TV	
2013	Kankar	Hum TV	
2013	Kadoorat	Hum TV	
2014	Main Deewani	Hum TV	
2014	Firaaq	Hum TV	
2015	Nazo	Urdu 1	
2016	Tum Yaad Aaye	ARY Digital	
2016	Teri Chah Main	ARY Digital	
2016	Zindagi Tujh Ko Jiya	Hum TV	
2016	Sila	Hum TV	
2016	Bay Khudi	ARY Digital	
2017	Teri Raza	ARY Digital	
2018	Nibah	ARY Digital	
2018	Khudparast	ARY Digital	
2019	Bandish	ARY Digital	
2019	Hasad	ARY Digital	
2019	Bewafa	ARY Digital	
2020	Jalan	ARY Digital	
2020	Aulaad	ARY Digital	
2021	Ishq Hai	ARY Digital	
2022	Pyar Deewangi Hai	ARY Digital	
2023	Hum Dono	Express Entertainment	
2023	Bandish (season 2)	ARY Digital	
2023	Mujhay Qubool Nahi	Geo Entertainment	
2025	Sirf Shabana	Hum TV	
