= Sana Sarfaraz =

Pakistani actress and model

Sana Sarfaraz is a Pakistani actress and model, known for her role as Shehnila in the drama serial Zindagi Gulzar Hai (2013). She has played the lead role of Areen in Dil Hi To Hai (2017). As a model, she has been nominated for several awards, including Lux Style Award.

== Early life and education ==
Sarfaraz was brought up in Abu Dhabi and moved to Pakistan when she was 10. She has been working in the media since 2012.

She received her bachelor's degree in Media Sciences from Iqra University and her Masters in Advertising from SZABIST in Karachi.

== Awards and recognition ==
SHOWS	YEAR	TITLE
Lux Style Awards	2012	Nominated - Best Emerging Talent
Veet Celebration of Beauty Awards Launching of Suzuki Ciaz	2013 2017	Nominee, Most Promising Model Of The Year: Host of the event

== Modelling and commercial work ==
Sarfaraz has established a career as a model. She has appeared in several TV commercials for international and local brands.
