= Sidra Batool =

Ambassador

- Born: 8 December 1996 (age 29); Quetta, Pakistan
- Education: Iqra University
- Occupation: Actress
- Years active: 2012–present
- Height: 1.65 m (5 ft 5 in)
- Spouse: Ahsan Qureshi

Sidra Batool is a Pakistani actress known for her roles in television serials such as Daagh (2012), Yeh Zindagi Hai (2012), Ishq Hamari Galiyon Mein (2013), and Parvarish (2014).

Her performance in Ishq Hamari Galiyon Mein earned her a nomination for Hum Award for Best Soap Actress.

== Filmography test ==
Year	title	Role	Notes
2015	Halla Gulla	Irum	debut
2015	Bin Roye	Saba's friend Shiza	

== Television ==
- 2012 Daagh as Uroosa on ARY Digital
- 2012 Yeh Zindagi Hai as Jannat "Jenny" Shirazi on Geo TV
- 2013 Khuda Dil Mein Hai as Ayesha on ARY Digital
- 2013 Ishq Hamari Galiyon Mein as Falak on Hum TV
- 2014 Parvarish as Isbah on ARY Digital
- 2014 Arranged Marriage as Meeral on ARY Digital
- 2014 Agar as Zara on ARY Digital (Telefilm)
- 2015 Dil Ka Kia Rung Karun Ka Kya Rung Karun as Hooriya on Hum TV
- 2015 Aye Zindagi as Nimra on Hum TV
- 2015 Wafa Na Ashna as Saman on PTV Home
- 2015 Love Mein Twist as Usva on PTV Home
- 2015 Shikkast as Mariam on Hum TV (Telefilm)
- 2016 Bin Roye as Mahnoor (cameo appearance)
- 2017 Shikwa Nahi Kissi Se as Navaal
- 2020 Umeed as Umeed, on Har Pal Geo
