= Mohib Mirza =

Pakistani actor (born 1979)

- Born: 18 August 1979 (age 47); Karachi, Pakistan
- Occupations: Actor; Director; TV host; Comedian; Playwright
- Years active: 1999–present
- Spouses: Aamina Sheikh (m. 2005; div. 2019) Sanam Saeed (m. 2021)
- Children: 2

Mohib Mirza (Urdu: محیب مرزا) (born 18 August 1979) is a Pakistani actor, director, playwright, television host and comedian.

He is known for his work in the film and television industry of Pakistan for which he has been nominated for various awards.

== Career ==
Mirza started off as a theatre actor in 1999. He was doing Bachelors in Commerce and ran out of funds for the next semester which made him and his friends start a theatre company of their own called Dramaybaaz. They wrote and directed an Urdu play, One Way Ticket, which ran in PACC for 7 days receiving an overwhelming response. Mirza managed to raise more than thrice the amount of money he needed for the next semester.

Mirza made his debut on television in Sahira Kazmi's popular PTV drama serial Zebunnisa, about a girl who becomes the victim of domestic violence. Since then Mirza has acted in numerous television serials, telefilms, sitcoms and TV commercials.

He earned international recognition with his film Insha Allah (2009), winning the award in Best Supporting Actor category at the International Filmmaker Film Festival held in Kent, England. Mirza is the first Pakistani actor to be awarded at the festival.

In 2018, he returned to TV serials after four years with the drama Deedan.

He turned to direction with the movie Ishrat Made in China, an action comedy released in 2022.

== Personal life ==
Mirza married actress Aamina Sheikh, at Karachi, in 2005. Their wedding was a three-day event taking place from 30 April to 2 May 2005. He had met Sheikh on the sets of a show which he was hosting and Sheikh was directing. In an interview given to Jang, Mohib revealed that he had the hardest time convincing Aamina's father and that each meeting with him involved "extensive grilling". Amid rumors of their divorce, Mirza himself confirmed in October 2019 that they had parted ways.

In 2021, Mirza married actress Sanam Saeed in a private ceremony. They announced their wedding in 2023.

His father Mohsin Mirza, who studied law, worked as a corporate employee, was an Urdu poet, painter, and inspired Mohib to become an artist, died in 2022.

== Filmography ==
=== Films ===
Key
Film are currently on Cinema

Year	Title	Role(s)	Director	Producer	Screenwriter	Notes
2009	Insha'Allah	Farhan				Kara Film Festival Award for Best Supporting Actor
2011	Love Mein Ghum	Himself				Special Appearance in song "Love Mein Ghum"
2013	Seedlings	Raza				Pakistan Media Award for Best Film Actor; Nominated–New York Film Festival Award for Best Actor in a Lead Role
2013	Josh: Independence Through Unity	Aamir				Nominated–Pakistan Media Award for Best Film Actor
2014	Dukhtar	Sohail				
2016	Bachaana	Vicky				
2016	Teri Meri Love Story	Nael				
2017	Arth - The Destination	Umar				
2022	Ishrat Made in China	Ishrat	Yes	Yes	Yes	

=== Television ===
Year	Title	Role	Network	Notes	Ref(s)
1999	Zaib-un-Nisa	Aamir			
1999	Faisla				
2000	Lipton Humsafar				
2003	Dunya Hai Dilwalon Ki				
2004	Enjoy Kar Ke				
2004	Faasley Gar Hongay Darmayan				
2005	Sultanat				
2005	Kehta Hai Dil			Episode: "Bribery & Society"	
2006	Jo Bat Ghar Mein Hai	Jehanzaib			
2006	Minglish				
2006	Ishrat Baji	Ishrat			
2006	Ranjish Hi Sahi	Shahaab			
2006	Kehta Hai Dil			Episode: "Gender Equality"	
2007	Khuda Ki Basti				
2007	Koi To Ho				
2007	Qissa-e-Ulfat			Episode: "Ajnabi"	
2008	Qissoun ki Chaddar	Nauman - Bakar		Episode: "Patriyaan"; Episode: "Aik Aur Akela"; Episode: "Tum Aurat Mein Mard"	
2008	Saba aur Fareeda				
2008	Grayhan				
2008	Tumhein Yad Karte Karte				
2008	Shehzadi	Sajju			
2008	Dil-e-Nadan	Faisal		Nominated–Lux Style Award for Best TV Actor (Satellite)	
2008	Agar Tum Na Hotay	Daniyal			
2008	Boltay Afsanay	Narrator		Episode: "Daayin"	
2009	Libaas	Shayaan		Episode: "Sattaeeswaan Ghar"	
2009	H.I.T	Zarak		Episode: "The Hacker"	
2010	Tumhein Kuch Yaad Hai Jaana	Romi			
2010	Phir Se Jeena Seekh Le				
2010	Meray Anganay Main	Sikandar			
2010	Anoushka				
2010	Daam	as himself		Cameo appearance	
2010	Hum Tum	Ali			
2010	Nadaaniyaan			One episode	
2010	Love Kay Liye	Mohib		Episode: "Pilot"	
2010	White Gold				
2010	Madhosh				
2010	Mera Saaein	Farhad			
2010	Neeli Chattri	Rustam		Episode: "Gairat Case"	
2010	Woh Chaar	Afzaal		Episode: "Sidra ki Kahani"	
2011	Zip Bus Chup Raho	Raij			
2011	Tere Bina	Ali			
2011	Ladies Park	Narrator			
2011	Tootay Huway Per	Samir			
2011	Roag	Faiq			
2012	Hazaron Saal	Mohib			
2012	Sabz Pari Laal Kabootar	Anjay/Anjum			
2012	Meray Dard Ko Jo Zuban Miley	Junaid			
2012	Shehr-e-Zaat	Hamza		Hum Award for Best Supporting Actor; Nominated–Pakistan Media Award for Best Supporting Actor	
2012	Aks	Shahnawaz			
2013	Kaash Aisa Ho	Shayyan			
2013	Shab-e-Arzoo Ka Alam	Dawood			
2013	Roshni Andhera Roshni	aafaq			
2013	Yeh Shadi Nahi Ho Sakti	Sikander			
2014	Firaaq	Amroze	Hum TV		
2018	Deedan	Zardaab	A-Plus TV		
2020	Dil Ruba	Sabi ul Hassan	Hum TV		
2020	Dushman e Jaan	Hatim	ARY Digital		
2021	Neeli Zinda Hai	Aman	ARY Digital		
2023	Razia	Razia's father	Express Entertainment		
2024	Jafaa	Hassan Aehsan	Hum TV		
2024	Tark e Wafa	Sabtain	ARY Digital		
2025	Ek Jhooti Kahani	Irfan	Hum TV		
2026	Rahguzar		Green Entertainment		

=== Telefilms ===
Year	Title	Role	Notes
2003	Ehteram-e-Muhabbat		
2003	Babli Ghar Se Bhaag Gayi		Gep TV
2004	Jin Pe Takiya Tha		
2004	Dhundalka		Screened at the 4th Kara Film Festival
2004	Kya Khoya Kya Paaya		
2004	Gurd		
2004	Pyaar Chahiye		
2005	Bandar Sher Bakri		
2005	Kafan		
2005	Ward No. 7		Screened at the 5th Kara Film Festival
2005	14 August Telefilm		
2005	Roothe Ho Tum		
2006	Maut		Screened at the 6th Kara Film Festival
2006	Babli Ghar Se Kyun Bhagi		Geo TV
2006	Ward No. 7 – Ek Naya Din		Aaj TV
2006	The Butcher		ARY Digital
2006	Gulabi Sari		TV One
2006	Blackboard		TV One
2007	Legend of Santa Bakra	Qurbaan Guru	Aaj TV
2007	Tohfa	Abrar	Nominated–TVOne Award for Best Actor
2007	Maid-2		TV One
2007	Chinaal		Hum TV
2007	Adbi Kahaniyaan	Faiz-ud-Deen	Episode Aulaad, Hum TV
2007	Bey Aasman Sitara		Geo TV
2007	Kharian Se KharaCut		Aaj TV
2007	Mulaqaat		PTV
2007	Aik Pakistani Mehman		PTV
2007	Short Cut		ARY Digital
2007	Sauda Aur Saudai	Karamat	ARY Digital
2007	Baabu Bhai Ka Bayl	Sallu	
2008	Phir Baabu Bhai Ka Bayl	Sallu	
2008	Zoja Akbar	Akbar	
2008	Baarish Mein Deewar	Haider Zaman	
2008	Aasman Choo Lay		
2008	Khwaabon Kay Ameer		
2008	Shanaakht		
2008	Ab Kya Karain		
2008	25 Kadam Par Maut		
2008	Sibghat Ki Dulhan	Sibghat	
2008	Mohandas		
2008	Once Upon A Time		
2008	Husn-e- Behijaab	Israr Baig	
2008	Raasta		
2008	Suddha Ki Katha		
2008	Billo Ki Eid Ho Gayi	Sikandar	
2008	Billo Ka Tickey Kat Gaya	Sikandar	
2009	Mout Se 2-Minute Pehle		Screened at the 7th Kara Film Festival
2009	Saans		
2009	Zindagi Mein Kuch Life	Mohsin	
2009	Farishta Or Shaitan	Shehanshah	
2009	Dus Din	Hamid	
2009	Babies Unlimited	Waheed-ud-din	
2010	Twins	Sajal	
2010	Patli Gali	Adil	
2010	32 March	Kamran	
2010	I Hate You	Ali	
2010	One Way Ticket	Ahmar	
2010	Pyaar Mein Twist	Jimmy	
2010	Mera Mian Bolay Maen	Asif	
2011	Inteha	Farhan	
2014	Kanebaaz	Aslam	
2022	Full Fry	Salman	ARY Digital

== Theater ==
Year	Title	Director	Organisation
1999	One Way Ticket	Yaseen Bizenjo	Dramay Baaz – The Theatre Company for Youth
2003	Kya Khoya Kya Paaya	Shahid Shafaat	Katha
2006	Sahib-e-Karamaat – a story by Munto	Munto	Dramay Baaz – The Theatre Company for Youth
2006	Hattak – a story by Munto	Munto	Dramay Baaz – The Theatre Company for Youth

== Music ==
- Hadiqa Kiani's Saraiki single "Dholan" for album Rung (2004)
- Akhter Qayyum's remix video "Kali Kali Rat Mein" (In darkness of the night), for brand Tulsi, directed by Sohail Javed (2006)
- Abrar-ul-Haq's music video "Nachaan Me Ode Naal" (I will dance with her), for brand Coca-Cola Pakistan (2008)
- Call's music video Mere Paas Kuch Nahi (I have nothing), as a mental man (2007)
- Tania and Omer's music video "Tere Liye" (for you), also featured Aamina Sheikh (2009)

== Awards and nominations ==
Year	Ceremony	Category	Project	Result	Ref(a)
2010	9th Lux Style Awards	Best TV Actor (Satellite)	Dil-e-Nadaan	Nominated	
2014	13th Lux Style Awards	Best TV Actor (Terrestrial)	Roshni Andhera Roshni	Nominated	
2014	13th Lux Style Awards	Best Film Actor	Seedlings	Nominated	
2017	16th Lux Style Awards	Best Lead Actor in a Film	Bachaana	Nominated	
2025	10th Hum Awards	Best Actor - Popular	Jafaa	Nominated	
2025	10th Hum Awards	Best Actor - Jury	Jafaa	Nominated	
2025	10th Hum Awards	Best Onscreen Couple - Popular (with Mawra Hocane)	Jafaa	Nominated	
2025	10th Hum Awards	Best Onscreen Couple - Jury (with Mawra Hocane)	Jafaa	Nominated	
2025	10th Hum Awards	Best Actor in a Negative Role	Jafaa	Nominated	

== See also ==
- List of Lollywood actors
