= Nirmala's Spice World =

- Genre: Cooking Show
- Created by: Veria Living
- Starring: Nirmala Narine
- Country of origin: United States
- Original language: English

Production
- Production location: United States
- Production company: Veria

Original release
- Network: First-run syndication
- Release: 14 January 2013

Nirmala's Spice World is an American syndicated Cooking show from the United States. The half-hour-long primetime program is produced and distributed in the U.S. by Veria.

This show also aired in Indian on Zindagi under the segment "Fursat Ke Pal".

== Plot ==
Nirmala's Spice World is a culinary adventure that takes the viewer into a world of exotic spices from around the globe. The "Queen of Spice," Nirmala Narine, opens her spice cabinet to reveal ancient secrets of spices that for generations have transformed plain dishes into unique and flavorful experiences. Each episode is dedicated to a single spice, and Nirmala shares recipes accentuated by both their exotic flavor and their curative properties. With an Ayurvedic approach, she unveils the secrets of how each featured spice not only flavors your food, but may also heal your body and mind.
