= Qatil Haseenaon Ke Naam =

- Genre: Crime fiction; Drama
- Created by: Meenu Gaur
- Written by: Farjad Nabi; Meenu Gaur
- Directed by: Meenu Gaur
- Starring: Rubya Chaudhry; Sanam Saeed; Sarwat Gilani; Eman Suleman; Faiza Gillani
- Composer: Saad Hayat
- Country of origin: Pakistan
- Original language: Urdu
- No. of seasons: 1
- No. of episodes: 6 (list of episodes)

Production
- Producers: Hasan Raza Abidi; Shailja Kejriwal
- Running time: 49 mins

Original release
- Release: 10 December 2021

Qatil Haseenaon Ke Naam is a Pakistani, crime fiction, drama, original web series available on ZEE5. The six-episode series was created and directed by British-Indian director Meenu Gaur and cowritten by her and Pakistani writer/director Farjad Nabi. It is produced by Hasan Raza Abidi and Shailja Kejriwal. It was released on 10 December 2021 and stars Rubya Chaudhry, Sanam Saeed, Sarwat Gilani, Eman Suleman and Faiza Gillani in the lead roles.

== Plot ==
Mai Maalki is an aggrieved woman who punishes deceitful, opportunistic and/or violent men for their crimes and sins. There are many such villainous male characters in the series.

== Cast ==
- Samiya Mumtaz as Mai Malki
- Sanam Saeed as Zuvi
- Sarwat Gilani as Mehek
- Mehar Bano as Anarkali
- Faiza Gillani as Kanwal
- Beo Raana Zafar as Massey Ma
- Eman Suleman as Zehra
- Rubya Chaudhry as Natasha
- Saleem Mairaj as Najji Shah
- Ahsan Khan as Gulab
- Osman Khalid Butt as Aftab
- Sheheryar Munawar as Bilal
- Kashif Hussian as Amar
- Fawad Khan as Abdullah
- Omar Rahim as Jojji
- Hajra Yamin as Dolla
- Tara Mahmood as Dr. Naheed

== Episode list ==
No. overall	No. in season	Title	Directed by	Written by	Original release date
1	1	"Mehek"	Meenu Gaur	Farjad Nabi, Meenu Gaur	10 December 2021
After Najji Shah's young bride Zehra is killed, he escapes and leaves his first wife, Mai Maalki to clean up the bloody mess. Mehek, a married woman, is unaware that her marriage is built on a lie.
2	2	"Kanwal"	Meenu Gaur	Farjad Nabi, Meenu Gaur	10 December 2021
Mai Maalki distributes blood-soaked packages of Zehra's remains to the entire neighbourhood to get rid of the evidence. Meanwhile, Kanwal, a newcomer, begins to settle into her new job as a nurse.
3	3	"Zuvi"	Meenu Gaur	Farjad Nabi, Meenu Gaur	10 December 2021
Mai Maalki threatens the residents in the neighbourhood when they show reluctance to destroy the evidence of Zehra's murder. Meanwhile, Zuvi, a high-society woman, discovers a secret in her marriage.
4	4	"Massey Ma"	Meenu Gaur	Farjad Nabi, Meenu Gaur	10 December 2021
While the blood from Zehra's murder has dried, more has been spilt. Massey Ma, a terminally ill woman, wants to set the scales of justice right before she dies when she realises her mistake.
5	5	"Zehra"	Meenu Gaur	Farjad Nabi, Meenu Gaur	10 December 2021
While Zehra's body is disposed of, little is known about her life and death. In the past, Najji Shah meets Zehra, setting off a chain of events. Who is Mai Maalki, and what's Anarkali's connection to her?
6	6	"Anarkali aur Mein Maalki"	Meenu Gaur	Farjad Nabi, Meenu Gaur	10 December 2021
All tales have led to the bloody endgame. Soon, the truth about the night of Zehra's murder is revealed.

== Release ==
ZEE5 and Zindagi released on 18 November 2021 a trailer for the series launch; the series itself was released on the 10th of the following month.

== Reception ==
=== Critical reviews ===
Professional ratings
Review scores
Source	Rating
Ottplay	4/5 stars
Cinestaan	2.5/5 stars

Akhila Damodaran of OTTPlay has given it 4/5 stars stating that the web series is a feminist, bold and unconventional Pakistani noir. The series has many surprises. It has bold and heretical as it shows that women are also drinking and smoking, never seen in Pakistani dramas. It is well written and edited. The actors' performances were impressive, and the main highlight was the background score. The web series is a definite watch that has a rare subject dealt in Urdu cinema and dramas and comes with a pleasant surprise.

Roushni Sarkar of Cinestaan gave 2.5/5 stars stating that the web series is an aesthetic, audacious depiction of women seeking revenge and serving justice. The well-written series boasts of power-packed performances by the entire cast, though it gains momentum and intensity a little late. Series with a power-pack performance by all the actors, music composer has played well, the climax moment of each story and the jaw-dropping twists reward the viewer's patience.

Archi Sengupta of Leisurebyte says that the stories involving women are usually wild, scary or shocking or a mixture of all three. The web series has some great performances. In a femme fatale story, the actresses are absolutely wonderful and great to watch. Set in one neighbourhood, these women form the backbone of the story that keeps everything together. The characters are interesting and their lives’ problems are shocking enough to warrant at least one watch.
