= Dil Mera Dharkan Teri (2013 film) =

2013 album

- Poster
- Based on: Dil Mera Dharkan Teri by Waheed Murad
- Directed by: Mehreen Jabbar
- Starring: Sanam Saeed; Ahsan Khan; Sarwat Gilani
- Country of origin: Pakistan
- Original language: Urdu

Production
- Producers: Tarang Housefull; Humayun Saeed
- Editor: Wajahatullah Khan
- Running time: 90 minutes
- Production company: Six Sigma Entertainment

Original release
- Release: 28 March 2013

Dil Mera Dharkan Teri (Urdu: دل میرا دھڑکن تیری, lit. 'The Heart is Mine, the Heartbeat Yours') is a 2013 Pakistani romantic drama telefilm directed by Mehreen Jabbar. Film is a remake of the same name released in 1968, starred by Waheed Murad and Rani. The film is produced by Humayun Saeed and Tarang Housefull. Film stars Sanam Saeed, Ahsan Khan and Sarwat Gilani.

== Cast ==
- Ahsan Khan as Saad
- Sarwat Gilani as Saira
- Sanam Saeed as Beenish
- Zeenat Yasmin
- Shamim Hilaly as Amma
- Zaheen Tahira as Ammi (Cameo)
- Manzoor Qureshi (Cameo)

== Soundtrack ==
Dil Mera Dhadkan Teri

Soundtrack album by Rahat Fateh Ali Khan and Shaan
- Length: 37:45
- Language: Urdu
- Producer: Humayun Saeed

Dil Mera Dhadkan Teri songs are sung by Rahat Fateh Ali Khan and Shaan.

Track list
No.	Title	Singer(s)	Length
1.	"Kiya Hai Jo Pyar To Padega Nibhana"	Shaan	5:23
2.	"Juda Juda"	Rahat Fateh Ali Khan	5:38
