= Dil Mera Dharkan Teri (1968 film) =

1968 Pakistani film

- Film poster
- Directed by: M.A. Rasheed
- Produced by: Murtaza Aftab
- Starring: Waheed Murad; Shamim Ara; Rani; Lehri; Nighat Sultana; Salma Mumtaz; Talish
- Music by: Inayat Hussain
- Production companies: M.A.R. and N.N. Productions
- Release date: 1 April 1968
- Running time: approx. 3 hours
- Country: Pakistan
- Language: Urdu

Dil Mera Dharkan Teri (transl. My heart, your heartbeat) is a 1968 Pakistani Urdu-language musical romance film produced by Murtaza Aftab and directed by M. A. Rasheed.

Waheed Murad and Shamim Ara played the star-crossed lovers in the film with Rani as an antagonist and Lehri as a comedian. In 2017, the film was screened at Lok Virsa Museum in Pakistan.

== Plot ==
Najma and Shakeel love each other and want to marry. However, Najma's father is against this marriage due to the poor family background of Shakeel. Najma then decides not to marry him to avoid causing any distress to her father who is a heart patient. When her father learns that she has decided to never marry because of Shakeel, he suffers a fatal cardiac arrest. After the father's death, she works hard to make her career and becomes a doctor.

On the other hand, Shakeel doesn't understand her reason of not marrying and blames her considering her unfaithful. Nadira, Shakeel's class fellow who also likes him and belongs to a rich family becomes close to him after Najma's departure. She teases Shaeekl when Najma doesn't come to him and in return, he slaps her.

One day, Shakeel's mother has a road accident with Najma's car. Najma brings her to the hospital with an engineer which disturbs Shakeel and he blames her, falsely considering that she has married. On the deathbed, Shakeel's mother advises him to marry Nadira and she considers her a good match for her son. They got marry and after their marriage, Nadira's behavior changes altogether and she reveals it to Shakeel that she has just married him to avenge his earlier slap. Shakeel then leaves home, falls on the road due to weakness and is taken to the clinic. The clinic comes out of Najma where she discovers that he is suffering from tuberculosis. She decides to bring him back to a healthy life and for this purpose, she takes the help of Shahid, Shakeel's close friend. Najma disguises herself as a nurse and looks after him, considering that he hates her now and would not even like to see her. Shahid tells Shakeel about Najma that she has not married yet due to him and she was compelled just like he was, due to his mother's last wish. When he recovers completely and leaves the hospital, Najma sings the same song that he used to sing for her from which he realises that she is her Najma and the both reunite there.

== Cast ==
- Waheed Murad - Shakeel
- Shamim Ara - Najma
- Rani - Nadira
- Lehri
- Salma Mumtaz
- Nighat Sultana
- Talish

== Release ==
Dil Mera Dharkan Teri was released by Naila Films on 1 April 1968, in Pakistani cinemas. The film completed 18 weeks on the main cinema and 58 weeks on the other cinemas in Karachi and thus became a golden jubilee film.

== Remake ==
It was remade in 2013 with the same name, which starred Ahsan Khan, Sanam Saeed, Sarwat Gilani, directed by Mehreen Jabbar and produced by Humayun Saeed.

== Music ==
The music was composed by Master Inayat Hussain and the songs were written by Qateel Shifai. Playback singers are Ahmed Rushdi, Mala, Mehdi Hassan and Masood Rana.

=== Discography ===
- Kiya Hai Jo Pyar Tau Padega Nibhana by Ahmed Rushdi
- Kiya Hai Jo Pyar Tau Padega Nibhana by Ahmed Rushdi and Mala
- Dil ka dard beich ke... by Mala
- Rooth gayi kyun mujh se... by Ahmed Rushdi and Mala
- Guzrey na sham akeli... by Ahmed Rushdi and Mala
- Ab to aaja keh tujhe yaad kiya hai dil ne... by Mehdi Hassan
- Jhoom aye dil woh mera jaan-e-bahar aaye ga... by Masood Rana
