= Hum Network =

Pakistani television network

Hum Network Limited
- Type: Public
- Traded as: PSX: HUMNL
- Industry: Media
- Founded: 12 February 2004; 22 years ago
- Founder: Sultana Siddiqui
- Headquarters: Karachi, Sindh, Pakistan, Pakistan
- Number of locations: Islamabad, Pakistan
- Key people: Mazhar-ul-Haq Siddiqui (Chairman); Duraid Qureshi (CEO)
- Products: TV channels; Magazines; Online stores
- Revenue: ▲ Rs. 6.82 billion (US$24 million) (2023)
- Operating income: ▲ Rs. 2.43 billion (US$8.7 million) (2023)
- Net income: ▲ Rs. 2.14 billion (US$7.7 million) (2023)
- Total assets: ▲ Rs. 8.25 billion (US$30 million) (2023)
- Total equity: ▲ Rs. 7.245 billion (US$26 million) (2023)
- Number of employees: 721 (2023)
- Subsidiaries: Hum TV, Inc. Hum Network FZ LLC; Hum Network UK Limited; HUMM Co. Limited; Tower Sports Limited; Skyline Publications
- Website: humnetwork.tv
- Footnotes; Financials as of 30 June 2023

Hum Network Limited (Urdu: شبکه ہم محدود) is a Pakistani media company based in Karachi, Pakistan. It was established in February 2004 by Sultana Siddiqui.

It is a member of Asia-Pacific Broadcasting Union (APBU), Association for International Broadcasting (AIB), and Commonwealth Broadcasting Association (CBA).

== History ==
Hum Network Limited was established in February 2004 with the name of Eye TV Limited by Siddiqui. The name was later changed to Eye Television Network Limited on 18 November 2004. The present name, Hum Network, was adopted on 21 January 2011. It was registered with Pakistan Electronic Media Regulatory Authority in October 2004 to operate its first satellite channel Hum TV which went live in January 2005. In June 2005, it was listed on the Karachi Stock Exchange, following an initial public offering for a price of PKR 10 per share.

In February 2013, Hum Awards were launched.

In September 2014, the Network launched Hum Films. Its debut film released under banner was Na Maloom Afraad in October 2014.

== TV channels ==
=== TV Channels Pakistan ===
- Hum TV (HD General entertainment channel Pakistan & South Asia)
- Hum Sitaray (HD secondary General entertainment channel Pakistan & South Asia)
- Hum News (HD 24 hours Urdu News channel Pakistan & South Asia)
- Hum Masala (HD Pakistan's no.1 Food channel Pakistan & South Asia)
- Hum Pashto 1 (HD Pashto General entertainment channal Pakistan & South Asia)
- Ten Sports (HD 24 hours 7 days Sports channel Pakistan & South Asia)

=== International channels ===
- Hum Europe (Europe HD General entertainment channel)
- Hum World (United States) (HD General entertainment channel)
- Hum MENA (Middle East & North Africa) (HD General entertainment channel)

== Hum Films ==
Hum Films is a film production and distribution company working under the Hum Network Limited. It was launched in September 2014, with setting a film Na Maloom Afraad to release domestically on 5 October 2014. The second film, banner released was a romance Bin Roye on 18 July 2015.

=== Distributions ===
Release Date	Title	Notes
6 October 2014	Na Maloom Afraad	
2 February 2015	Bilal: A New Breed of Hero	International
18 July 2015	Bin Roye	
18 December 2015	Dilwale	International
12 February 2016	Sanam Re	International
26 February 2016	Bachaana	
22 April 2016	Hijrat	
6 May 2016	Mah e Mir	
20 May 2016	Aksbandh	
7 July 2016	Sawal 700 Crore Dollar Ka	co-distribution with Eveready Pictures
22 July 2016	Ishq Positive	
2 September 2016	Teri Meri Love Story	co-distribution with Summit Entertainment
9 September 2016	Freaky Ali	International
20 January 2017	Thora Jee Le	Distribution
Eid-ul-Fitr 2017	Yalghaar	
Eid-ul-Adha 2017	Parwaaz Hay Junoon	
17 November 2017	Verna	Shoaib Mansoor Film
29 December 2017	Chupan Chupai	Distributor
2 February 2018	Maan Jao Na	co-distribution with Eveready Pictures
9 February 2018	Azad	co-distribution with Eveready Pictures
23 March 2018	Tick Tock	Distribution
16 June 2018	Na Band Na Baraati	Distribution
21 December 2018	Zero	International
28 December 2018	Simmba	International
5 June 2019	Chhalawa	Distribution
19 July 2019	Ready Steady No	Distribution
12 August 2019	Superstar	Distribution
4 October 2019	Daal Chawal	Distribution
20 December 2019	Sacch	Distribution
May 2022	Dum Mastam	
May 2026	Khan Tumhara	Production and Distribution

=== Hum Mart ===
HumMart was an online retailer which was launched on 20 April 2018 by Duraid Qureshi.

=== Others ===
- Hum Awards
- Hum Style Awards
- Hum Films
