= Kankar (TV series) =

Pakistani drama television series aired in 2013

- Genre: Romance; Social; Serial drama
- Based on: Woh Dil Ke Tehar Kane Ka Mausam by Umera Ahmad
- Written by: Umera Ahmad
- Directed by: Aabis Raza
- Starring: Fahad Mustafa; Sanam Baloch
- Country of origin: Pakistan
- Original language: Urdu
- No. of episodes: 25

Original release
- Network: Hum TV
- Release: 31 May – 6 December 2013

Kankar (Urdu: کنکر, lit. 'Pebble') is a 2013 Pakistani drama television serial that originally aired on Hum TV from 31 May 2013 to 6 December 2013. It tackles the subject of domestic violence. Directed by Aabis Raza and written by Umera Ahmad, the serial starred Fahad Mustafa and Sanam Baloch.

Danish Taimoor was first offered the main role of Sikandar which was later played by Fahad Mustafa .

== Plot ==
It is the story of two best friends who are paternal cousins, Arzoo and Kiran. Arzoo is a rich girl who is in love with her rich maternal cousin, Sikandar. On the other hand, Kiran's cousin Adnan likes her but cannot ask for her hand in marriage due to his poor financial conditions and his sister's upcoming marriage. Sikandar falls in love with Kiran when he meets her at the wedding of Arzoo's brother's and insists that his mother should go and talk to Kiran's parents for him. This leads to a dispute between the families. Arzoo breaks her friendship with Kiran and envies her. Kiran and Sikandar are married, but they soon start getting into huge fights, which end in Kiran being physically abused by Sikandar. Furthermore, she is even scolded by her mother-in-law for her expressions of concern and complaints. The couple's fights lead to Kiran suffering a miscarriage when Sikandar, in a fit of rage, throws her to the ground. He tries to apologize, but Kiran asks Sikandar for a divorce. The families try their best to change her mind, but Kiran is adamant, and Sikandar unwillingly divorces her. After his divorce, Sikandar's mother quickly gets him married to Arzoo. Arzoo is pleased with the marriage but is bothered by Sikandar's feelings for his ex-wife. People start blaming Kiran for her broken marriage and compliment Arzoo for her luck. Adnan's sister finally gets married after her long-term engagement but still lives with her mother and brother as her husband is abroad. Adnan tries to convince his mother into asking for Kiran's hand in marriage for him, but she disapproves as she doesn't want a divorcee to marry her only son. Despite the negativity associated with Kiran being a divorcee, Adnan is able to persuade both families, and they are married in a simple ceremony. Upon finding out about Kiran's second marriage to her cousin, Sikandar's jealousy makes him explode in anger, which leads to intense arguments with Arzoo. Arzoo leaves the house and breaks down in front of her mother. Sikandar's mother scolds her son for the embarrassment that she had to face in front of Arzoo's parents because of his behavior. Sikandar asks for Arzoo to pardon him and gets her back. Kiran finds it difficult to adjust in Adnan's house because of his sister's rude behaviour and tantrums. Soon, even Adnan and Kiran start having arguments but end up sorting everything out. Arzoo is soon blessed with a baby boy and sweetmeats are distributed in the family. Kiran too receives a box from Arzoo's mother which angers Adnan. Sikandar overhears Arzoo talking to her mother about Kiran's fights with Adnan and this fills him with glee. When his wife asks to be told the reason for his joy, Sikandar cannot help but become the ultimate epitome of narcissism. This causes the couple to fight. Sikandar ends up abusing Arzoo and she leaves again with her baby. Sikandar's behavior is exposed to the family, and they realise Kiran was right for leaving him. Adnan's brother-in-law calls his wife and tells her that her paperwork has been completed and that she can finally move with him. She is filled with joy and tries to make up for her previous rotten treatment with Kiran. Arzoo visits Kiran and tells her that she made the right decision of leaving Sikandar. Kiran advises her to think wisely before taking any decision as she also has a child to care for. One day, Kiran, with her sister-in-law, is in the market & happens to stumble into Sikandar. He confesses that he truly loves her and would even divorce Arzoo just to get her back which warrants a slap from her, and she warns him to never disrespect a woman or raise his hand on anyone ever again. Sikandar realises his mistakes and begs for Arzoo's forgiveness. Adnan's sister apologizes to her brother and his wife for all the trouble that she caused between them. At the end, Kiran and Adnan are thrilled as they are expecting a child together.

== Main characters ==
- Fahad Mustafa as Sikander Waqar - Waqar and Shaista's son, Kiran’s ex and Arzoo’s husband, Asher’s Father
- Sanam Baloch as Kiran Sikandar Waqar/Adnan - Jamal and Aisha's daughter; Iram's sister, Sikandar’s ex-wife and Adnan’s wife
- Ismat Zaidi as Aisha Jamal - Jamal's wife; Kiran and Iram's mother.
- Behroze Sabzwari as Jamal - Aisha's husband; Kiran and Iram's father; Kamal and Aapa's brother.
- Diya Mughal as Iram Jamal - Jamal and Aisha's daughter; Kiran's sister.
- Shakeel as Kamal - Fayka's husband; Arzoo's father; Jamal and Aapa's brother.
- Sheheryar Zaidi as Waqar - Shaista's husband; Sikander's father.
- Sabahat Ali Bukhari as Fayka Jamal - Jamal's wife; Arzoo's mother; Alisha's sister.
- Humaira Ali as Aapa - Jamal and Kamal's Sister; Adnan and Rukhsar's mother.
- Uroosa Siddiqui as Rukhsar - Aapa's daughter; Adnan's sister.
- Maha Warsi as Arzoo Sikandar Waqar - Kamal and Fayka's daughter, Sikandar’s wife and Asher’s mother
- Hassan Niazi as Adnan - Aapa's son; Rukhsar's brother.
- Laila Zuberi as Shaista Waqar - Waqar's wife; Sikander's mother.

== Broadcast and release ==
Kankar originally aired on Hum TV from May 31 to December 6, 2013.

It aired on Zindagi in India from April 13, 2016.

After being removed from iflix in 2019, it was released on Starzplay and later on Hum TV's app in April 2020.

== Reception ==
=== Critical reception ===
Kankar received positive reviews from critics with praise for Baloch's performance as Kiran, Mustafa's performance as Sikandar and major appraisal towards the script. Express Tribune praised the empowered portrayal of the victimised women of domestic abuse, and praised the story line stating, "The main factor that makes Kankar different from serials portraying a similar story line is that in spite of social and family pressure, Kiran stands up for herself and asks Sikandar for a divorce". Another reviewer of the same publication praised the Baloch portrayal as Kiran. DAWN Images praised its storyline and listed it in "Exemplary Urdu dramas".

== Accolades ==
Date of ceremony	Award	Category	Recipient(s) and nominee(s)	Result	Ref.
December, 04 2014	Lux Style Awards	Best Television Actor	Fahad Mustafa	Nominated	
