= Momina Duraid =

Pakistani director and producer

- Occupations: Producer; director
- Known for: Senior producer and creative head of television network Hum TV; CEO Momina Duraid Productions
- Spouse: Duraid Qureshi
- Children: 5
- Family: Sultana Siddiqui (mother-in-law)

Momina Duraid (Urdu: مُومِنہ دُرید) is a Pakistani director and producer. She is a senior producer and creative head of television network Hum TV and CEO of her own production company MD Productions. She has produced and created several series including Dastaan (2010), Qaid-e-Tanhai (2010–11), Humsafar (2011–12), Shehr-e-Zaat (2012), Zindagi Gulzar Hai (2012–13), Diyar-e-Dil (2015), Sadqay Tumhare (2015), Mann Mayal (2016), Udaari (2016), Bin Roye (2016), Yaqeen Ka Safar (2017), Suno Chanda (2018) and Ehd-e-Wafa (2019).

In 2015, Momina ventured into film direction and co-directed Bin Roye. Later that year, she founded film production house, Hum Films. She is married to Duraid Qureshi and is a daughter-in-law of Hum Network president and founder, Sultana Siddiqui. In 2015, she was named among the Pond's list of Miracle Journey: The 100 Most Inspirational Women.

== Career ==
Before joining the media industry, Momina was working as a marketing executive at a bank, she said, "Media was the last thing I thought I would do. My mother-in-law, Sultana Siddiqui, has been definitely associated with the industry as she worked for PTV but at the beginning, I was only looking after finances. I didn't know that I would be stepping into the creative side of things." She produced Samira Fazal's Mere Paas Paas as her first independent drama series, that earned her critical acclaim. In 2010 she produced partition based drama series Dastaan based on the novel Bano by Razia Butt, the series starred then newcomer Fawad Khan with Sanam Baloch playing the title character of Bano. Dastaan received extravagant reception from critics and became one of the most acclaimed series of all time. At 1st Hum Awards ceremony serial was awarded Hum Honorary Most Challenging Subject Award, and received five nominations at 10th Lux Style Awards, winning Best Director for Haissam Hussain Momina then produced number of series and founded her own production company Momina Duraid Productions and became the senior producer of Hum TV.

In 2011, Momina convinced Farhat Ishtiaq to dramatize her novel Humsafar into a television series, which was previously rejected by two production houses. After its release Humsafar gained instant popularity and received an overwhelming response from critics and people all over the world. Critics regarded Humsafar as revival of drama industry. Sabahat Zakariya of Dawn News wrote, "If Haseena Moin was the benchmark of mass popularity back then, then Humsafar is an indicator of our endemic regressiveness." The series has a cult following with huge fan following especially in India, Europe and North America. The series lead actors Mahira Khan and Fawad Khan went on to become most popular actors in Pakistani film and television industry. Hum TV honored the craft and crew of serial giving them a special Hum Honorary Phenomenal Serial Award.

In 2015, Momina co-directed her first film Bin Roye under her production house Hum Films, that earned her rave reviews, and became the third highest-grossing Pakistani film of all time. After the release of Bin Roye, Hum Films has distributed and produced over fifteen films both domestically and internationally.

In 2016, seven of ten-scheduled drama series that Momina produced including, Dastaan (2010), Humsafar (2011–12), Zindagi Gulzar Hai (2012–13), Sadqay Tumhare (2015) are set to release on online streaming service Netflix.

== Filmography ==
=== Films ===
- Bin Roye (2015) as co-director
- Superstar (2019) as producer
- Khan Tumhara (2026) as producer

=== Television ===
- Fareb (1993)
- Man-o-Salwa (2007)
- Malaal (2009)
- Dastaan (2010)
- Qaid-e-Tanhai (2010–11)
- Mera Naseeb (2011)
- Humsafar (2011–12)
- Shehr-e-Zaat (2012)
- Zindagi Gulzar Hai (2012–13)
- Kankar (2013)
- Dil e Muztar (2013)
- Behadd (2013)
- Mohabat Subh Ka Sitara Hai (2013–14)
- Muhabbat Ab Nahi Hugi (2014)
- Laa (2014)
- Digest Writer (2014–15)
- Sadqay Tumhare (2014–15)
- Alvidaa (2015)
- Diyar-e-Dil (2015)
- Mann Mayal (2016)
- Udaari (2016)
- Bin Roye (2016)
- Bad Gumaan (2016–2017)
- Yaqeen Ka Safar (2017)
- Gumrah (2017–2018)
- Dar Si Jaati Hai Sila (2018)
- Suno Chanda (2018)
- Ranjha Ranjha Kardi (2018–19)
- Aangan (2018–19)
- Suno Chanda 2 (2019)
- Ehd-e-Wafa (2019)
- Sabaat (2020)
- Chupke Chupke (2021)
- Parizaad (2021–22)
- Hum Tum (2022)
- Chand Tara (2023)
- Fairy Tale (2023)
- Very Filmy (2024)
- Mohabbat Reza Reza (2024–25)
- Judwaa (2025)
- Meem Se Mohabbat (2025)
- My Dear Cinderella (2025)
- Dil Wali Gali Mein (2025)

=== Web Series ===
- Jo Bachay Hain Sang Samait Lo (2026)

== Awards and nominations ==
List of Accolades received by Momina Duraid
Year	Award / Ceremony	Category	Work	Result	Notes	Ref(s)
2012	Hum Awards	Best Drama Serial	Shehr-e-Zaat	Won		
2013	Hum Awards	Best Drama Serial	Zindagi Gulzar Hai	Won		
2013	Hum Awards	Best Drama Serial Popular	Zindagi Gulzar Hai	Won		
2014	Hum Awards	Best Drama Serial	Bunty I Love You	Won		
2014	Hum Awards	Best Drama Serial Popular	Sadqay Tumhare	Won	shared with Samina Humayun Saeed and Tariq Shah	
2015	Hum Awards	Best Drama Serial	Diyar-e-Dil	Won		
2015	Hum Awards	Best Drama Serial Popular	Diyar-e-Dil	Won		
2010	Lux Style Awards	Best TV Serial - Satellite	Dastaan	Nominated		
2010	Lux Style Awards	Best TV Serial - Satellite	Malaal	Nominated		
2012	Lux Style Awards	Best TV Serial - Satellite	Humsafar	Won	shared with Nina Kashif	
2012	Lux Style Awards	Best TV Serial - Satellite	Shehr-e-Zaat	Nominated		
2013	Lux Style Awards	Best TV Serial - Satellite	Rehaai	Nominated	shared with Kashf Foundation	
2014	Lux Style Awards	Best Original Soundtrack	Sadqay Tumhare	Nominated	Shared with Samina Humayun Saeed and Tariq Shah	
2015	Lux Style Awards	Best Director - Film	Bin Roye	Nominated		
2015	Lux Style Awards	Best TV Play	Diyar-e-Dil	Won		
2015	Lux Style Awards	Best Original Soundtrack	Diyar-e-Dil	Won		
2021	Lux Style Awards	Best TV Play	Ehd-e-Wafa	Won	shared with ISPR	
2021	Lux Style Awards	Best TV Play	Yeh Dil Mera	Won		
2021	Lux Style Awards	Best TV Play	Sabaat	Nominated		
2021	Lux Style Awards	Best TV Play	Pyar Ke Sadqay	Won		
