= Zindagi Gulzar Hai =

2012-13 Pakistani television series

- Urdu: زندگی گلزار ہے
- Portuguese: A vida é bela
- Arabic: الحياة جميلة
- en-pirate: Hall
- Genre: Romance; Social
- Based on: Zindagi Gulzar Hai by Umera Ahmad
- Written by: Umera Ahmad
- Directed by: Sultana Siddiqui
- Starring: Sanam Saeed; Fawad Khan; (For entire cast see below)
- Opening theme: "Zindagi Gulzar Hai" by Ali Zafar
- Ending theme: "Zindagi Khaak Na Thi" by Hadiqa Kiani
- Country of origin: Pakistan
- Original language: Urdu
- No. of episodes: 26

Production
- Producer: Momina Duraid
- Cinematography: Shahzad Kashmiri
- Camera setup: Multi-camera
- Running time: Approx. 40–45 minutes
- Production company: Moomal Productions

Original release
- Network: Hum TV
- Release: 30 November 2012 – 24 May 2013

Zindagi Gulzar Hai (Urdu: زندگی گلزار ہے, English: "Life is a rose garden") is a Pakistani television series directed by Sultana Siddiqui, produced by Momina Duraid under the banner Moomal Productions, which was first broadcast on Hum TV. Based on the novel of the same name by Umera Ahmad, who also wrote the screenplay, it originally aired from 30 November 2012, to 24 May 2013, in Pakistan. The story revolves around two people, opposite in thoughts and financial status, and has a strong female protagonist, contributing to its popularity amongst women.

The series gained immense popularity across the Indian subcontinent, particularly in Pakistan, India, and Bangladesh, and topped the charts as the most searched item on Google in Pakistan, as per the end-of-year Google Trends report. It was listed by the DAWN Images among the iconic Pakistani dramas.

== Plot ==
The story revolves around the lives of Kashaf Murtaza and Zaroon Junaid. Kashaf comes from a lower-middle-class background and lives with her mother, Rafia, and her two sisters, Sidra and Shehnila. Rafia's husband, Murtaza, abandoned her because she did not give birth to a son. Murtaza married another woman, who eventually gave birth to his son, Hammad. The family faces many hardships, leaving Kashaf embittered, insecure, and distrustful of men. Rafia works as the principal of a government school and gives tuition to children in the evenings to make ends meet. Her daughters also make various sacrifices in order to maintain a basic standard of living.

Zaroon Junaid's family consists of his father, Junaid, who is calm and mature, and his mother, Ghazala Junaid, an independent working woman. Zaroon's sister, Sara, shares her mother's views on life, leading to clashes with Zaroon and his views on societal standards. Zaroon's close circle of friends consists of Asmara and Osama. He remains unaware that Asmara is in love with him. Their families arrange their engagement, but it is eventually broken off due to irreconcilable lifestyle differences. Meanwhile, his sister's marriage also fails. As a result, Zaroon develops certain notions about his ideal wife.

Zaroon and Kashaf eventually become acquainted and initially dislike each other. Through a series of events, they fall in love, and Kashaf learns not to be so bitter, secretive, and insecure. Zaroon, meanwhile, learns not to be impulsive and judgemental. A few months later, Kashaf gives birth to twin girls.

== Cast ==
- Sanam Saeed as Kashaf Murtaza/ Kashaf Zaroon: Zaroon's wife; Murtaza and Rafiya's; Sidra and Shehnila's sister; Tooba, Tanzeela and Hammad's half sister.
- Fawad Khan as Zaroon Junaid: Kashaf's husband; Junaid and Ghazala's son; Sara's brother; Asmara's ex fiancé; Osama's friend.
- Ayesha Omer as Sara Junaid: Junaid and Ghazala's daughter; Zaroon's sister; Farhan's ex wife. Ghufran's wife.
- Mehreen Raheel as Asmara Tariq: Zaroon's ex fiancée; Osama's friend.
- Sheheryar Munawar Siddiqui as Osama: Zaroon and Asmara's friend.
- Mansha Pasha as Sidra Murtaza: Murtaza and Rafiya's daughter; Kashaf and Shehnila's sister; Tooba, Tanzeela and Hammad's half sister.
- Sana Sarfaraz as Shehnila Murtaza: Murtaza and Rafiya's daughter; Kashaf and Sidra's sister; Tooba, Tanzeela and Hammad's half sister.
- Samina Peerzada as Rafiya Murtaza: Murtaza's first wife; Kashaf, Sidra and Shehnila's mother.
- Waseem Abbas as Murtaza: Rafiya's husband; Kashaf, Sidra, Shehnila, Tooba, Tanzeela and Hammad's father.
- Javed Shaikh as Junaid: Ghazala's husband; Zaroon and Sara's father.
- Hina Khawaja Bayat as Ghazala Junaid; Junaid's wife, Zaroon and Sara's mother.
- Behroze Sabzwari as Abrar: Junaid's friend.
- Maheen Rizvi as Maria Khan: Kashaf's university friend.
- Shazia Afgan as Nigar Murtaza: Murtaza's second wife; Tooba, Tanzeela and Hammad's mother.
- Muhammad Asad as Hammad Murtaza: Nigar and Murtaza's son; Kashaf, Sidra and Shehnila's half brother.
- Kanwar Nafees as Farhan Zaid: Sara's ex husband.
- Khalid Ahmed as Wahab: Murtaza's elder brother.

== Soundtrack ==
The Zindagi Gulzar Hai title song is sung by Ali Zafar and Hadiqa Kiani, composed by Shani Arshad with lyrics by Naseer Turabi.

== Release ==
=== Broadcast ===
Zindagi Gulzar Hai was originally broadcast on Hum TV in December 2012. It was later broadcast on Netflix for a few years.

== Production ==
Zindagi Gulzar Hai was author Umera Ahmad's first story written for the digest magazine. In an interview, she stated that the character of the lead female, Kashaf, in the novel is based on her own character. The story captured the interest of readers, and Ahmad was approached to write a full-length novel by Moomal Productions. In 2012, the production of the series began with Sultana Siddiqui as the director. It was Siddiqui's return to direction after a hiatus of eleven years.

== Reception ==
=== Television rating points (TRPs) ===
Zindagi Gulzar Hai started very well, averaging 6.4 TRPs, but after the climax episode, i.e., EP. 7, ratings increased dramatically, averaging and topping the charts each week. Then, after the marriage of the protagonists, ratings started increasing further, and later, Zindagi Gulzar Hai averaged 6+ TRPs, with 6.6 TRPs as the maximum until then. But, on 3 May 2013, Zindagi Gulzar Hai achieved 8.7 TRP, as declared by Hum TV. Many said it would set a new record when its last episode aired. And it did by reaching a point of 9.5. It became one of the highest-rated Pakistani television series of 2013.

=== Critical reception ===
Izzah Khan of The Express Tribune praised Sanam Saeed and Samina Peerzada's acting and the portrayal of the middle-class family but criticized the depiction of the elite family as self-righteous and unrealistic, with some scenes and dialogues being overdone and irksome, and the performances of Mehreen Raheel and Ayesha Omar. While writing for Dawn, Nadeem F. Paracha compared it with the blockbuster Humsafar and praised the series for the strong female character and the non-judgmental discourse of competing ideas of class, morality, and faith. Sabahat Zakariya of The Friday Times critiqued the series for perpetuating submissive female stereotypes, failing to depict the range of experiences of Pakistani women, and projecting a restrictive image of Pakistani womanhood, contrary to the real-life achievements and independence of the women involved in the production of the series.

Samina Peerzada's character of an abandoned wife yet supporting mother was widely praised. In the year-ender list by The Express Tribune, the reviewer described that her performance "stole many hearts with its emotional depth and true-to-life portrayal." In a 2015 article published by DAWN Images, the author credits the success of Pakistani television serials of that time to compelling storytelling and relatable characters like Kashaf, who inspire and resonate with audiences.

In May 2020, DAWN Images listed it among the iconic Pakistani TV series.

While reviewing for The News International in July 2025, Gaitee Ara Siddiqi praised the series its strong female protagonist, the on-screen chemistry between the leads, commends the performances of supporting cast mainly Samina Peerzada, script, dialogues, and direction, and the portrayal of social issues, such as women's treatment and class divides.

== Awards and accolades ==
| Year | Award | Category | Result | Ref |
|---|---|---|---|---|
| 2013 | Lux Style Awards | Best Original Soundtrack Zindagi Gulzar Hai | Won | |
| 2014 | Pakistan Media Awards | Best Drama of the year 2013 Zindagi Gulzar Hai | Won | |
| 2014 | Pakistan Media Awards | Best Director to Sultana Siddiqui | Won | |
| 2014 | Pakistan Media Awards | Best Writer to Umera Ahmad | Won | |
| 2014 | Hum Awards | Best Director Drama Serial to Momina Duraid | Won | |
| 2014 | Hum Awards | Best Drama Serial to Sultana Siddiqui | Won | |
| 2014 | Hum Awards | Best Supporting Actress to Samina Peerzada | Won | |
| 2014 | Hum Awards | Best Writer Drama Serial to Umera Ahmad | Won | |
| 2014 | Hum Awards | Best Onscreen Couple to Fawad Khan and Sanam Saeed | Won | |
| 2014 | Hum Awards | Best Drama Serial Viewers Choice to Momina Duraid | Won | |
| 2014 | Hum Awards | Best Onscreen Couple Viewers Choice to Fawad Khan and Sanam Saeed | Won | |
| 2014 | Hum Awards | Best Actor Viewers Choice to Fawad Khan | Won | |
| 2014 | Hum Awards | Best Actress Viewers Choice to Sanam Saeed | Won | |
| 2014 | Hum Awards | Best Actor to Fawad Khan | Won | |
| 2014 | Hum Awards | Best Actress to Sanam Saeed | Won | |
| 2014 | Hum Awards | Best Supporting Actor to Waseem Abbas | Won | |
| 2014 | Lux Style Awards | Best Television Actor – Satellite to Fawad Khan | Won | |
| 2014 | Lux Style Awards | Best Television Actress – Satellite to Sanam Saeed | Won | |
| 2014 | Lux Style Awards | Best Television Writer to Umera Ahmad | Nominated | |
| 2014 | Lux Style Awards | Best Television Director to Sultana Siddiqui | Nominated | |
