= Zindagi (TV channel) =

Indian television channel

Zee Zindagi
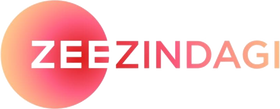
- Logo used since 2020
- Country: India

Programming
- Language: Hindi
- Picture format: 576p SDTV

Ownership
- Owner: Zee Entertainment Enterprises
- Sister channels: &TV; ZEE5; Zee TV (For full list see, list of channels owned by ZEEL)

History
- Launched: 23 June 2014; 12 years ago

Links
- Website: Official website on ZEE5

Zee Zindagi (also known as Zindagi TV) is an Indian general entertainment channel, owned by the Zee Entertainment Enterprises (ZEEL). It also promoted itself as a television channel broadcasting short-run programming and as India's new Hindi entertainment channel, rather than on-going, indefinite serials.

It has syndicated content from various countries including Brazil, Pakistan, South Korea, Turkey and Ukraine. It launched on 23 June 2014, ZEEL invested ₹100 crores to launch the network. Zindagi's shows Dhoop Ki Deewar and Qatil Haseenaon Ke Naam won big at Promax 2022 Awards.

== History ==
Its syndicated Pakistani soap opera, Aunn Zara, premiered on 23 June 2014, the day the channel was launched and ended its run on Zindagi on 12 July 2014, thus, making Zindagi the first Hindi general entertainment channel in India, to end a show in 20 days. In early-May 2015, Zindagi for the first time in its history launched two lifestyle shows of American origin, dubbed in Hindi. They were Simply Beautiful, a health and beauty tips show hosted by Roni Proter, and Nirmala's Spice World, a cookery show hosted by Chef Nirmala Narine. The channel also launched its first original Indian production, Shukriya, a reality show, in early-August 2015. Shukriya provides a platform for common people to come on television, share their personal stories, and say 'thank you' to their dear and loved ones. Zindagi also formed a partnership with BIG FM 92.7 for seven weeks, starting on 27 July 2015 (nearly two weeks before Shukriya's launch), to promote Shukriya through the radio using various methods, programmes, and special segments. This promotion on BIG FM spanned across its 24 radio stations based in various cities of India.

Following the 2016 Uri terror attack, Zindagi removed all Pakistani shows from their line up.

Zindagi became a digital only channel starting from 1 July 2017, with the content becoming accessible only on OZEE app.

With the launch of ZEE5, Zindagi has been rebranded as Zindagi Digital and streams digital exclusive international shows from Turkey, South Korea, Spain, Colombia, Ukraine, Pakistan, Brazil etc. in 12 major languages starting 15 February 2018. All content is accessible on ZEE5 app with premium membership

On 16 July 2020 it was announced that, Zindagi channel is relaunching on ZEE5. A channel new tagline is "Zindagi Mil Ke Jiyenge". The Zindagi brand was launched on 21 May 2020 worldwide excluding India and on 27 May 2020 in India on ZEE5 app.

On 4 September 2020, Shailja Kejriwal, Chief creative officer- special projects Zee Entertainment Enterprises announced there were no plans for Zindagi channel to return on a television platform. All content is for ZEE5 app only.

Zindagi launched Dhoop Ki Deewar on 25 June 2021 starring Sajal Aly and Ahad Raza Mir. The show highlights the grief and loss war brings to people no matter which side of the border they are from.

On 15 March 2021, Shailja Kejriwal, Chief Creative Officer (Special Projects) Zee Entertainment made another announcement related to Zindagi channel by saying "The new avatar of Zindagi not just has acquired content from the subcontinent, but also original shows produced in Pakistan and Bangladesh. Zindagi would produce 6-7 original shows every year and a large part would consist of content from neighbouring countries such as Pakistan and Bangladesh."

On 16 March 2022, Shailja Kejriwal, Chief Creative Officer (Special Projects) Zee Entertainment Enterprises hinted that in 2022 Zindagi channel will get back on television for its loyal audience.

From 23 May 2022, Zindagi channel launched as a DTH active services on Tata Play, Dish TV, D2H and Airtel Digital TV. On Tata Play it was launched as a Tata Play Zindagi, as Zindagi Special on Airtel Digital TV and on Dish TV as well as d2h as Zindagi Active.

Since 1 May 2025, Pakistani YouTube channels are inaccessible in India such as HUM TV, ARY Digital, Har Pal Geo, etc. and its content is unavailable citing an order from the government related to national security. Followed by this ZEE Zindagi has been removed its all Zindagi Original shows from ZEE5 and YouTube along with its DTH counterpart started airing Indian shows from his library amid India-Pakistan tension.

== See also ==
- List of Hindi-language television channels
- List of Indian TV stations
