= Chokher Bali =

Chokher Bali (lit. 'Sand in The Eyes') may refer to:

- Chokher Bali (novel), a Bengali-language novel by Rabindranath Tagore
  - Chokher Bali (1938 film), a Bengali drama film
  - Chokher Bali (2003 film), an Indian film adaptation by Rituparno Ghosh
  - Chokher Bali (TV series), an Indian television serial adaptation
