= Sang-e-Mar Mar =

2016 Pakistani television series

- Genre: Social; Romantic drama
- Written by: Mustafa Afridi
- Directed by: Saife Hassan
- Starring: Noman Ijaz; Sania Saeed; Mikaal Zulfiqar; Kubra Khan; Omair Rana
- Country of origin: Pakistan
- Original language: Urdu
- No. of seasons: 1
- No. of episodes: 28

Production
- Producer: Momina Duraid
- Production locations: Ronyal, Swat district
- Cinematography: Saife Hassan; Khizer Idrees
- Editor: Saad Bin Jawed
- Camera setup: Multi-camera setup
- Running time: 32-41 minutes

Original release
- Network: Hum TV
- Release: 1 September 2016 – 9 March 2017

Sang-e-Mar Mar (Urdu: سنگِ مر مر, transl. Marble), previously titled Daasi, is a Pakistani drama serial that aired on Hum TV from 1 September 2016 to 9 March 2017. It stars Nauman Ijaz, Sania Saeed, Mikaal Zulfiqar, and Kubra Khan in leading roles with Omair Rana, Paras Masroor, Uzma Hassan, Tipu Sharif and Kaif Ghaznavi in supporting roles. It is directed by Saife Hassan and written by Mustafa Afridi. Focussing on the honour culture in tribal areas, it states how love and revenge annihilate relations.

A spiritual successor titled Sang-e-Mah aired on the same channel from January 2022 to July 2022.

== Synopsis ==
Sang-e-Mar Mar is centred around childhood friends Shireen and Aurang. Shireen mistakenly believes that Aurang is the love of her life since their youth, even though they have not seen each other for many years. Aurang, much to the disapproval of his father, has moved to the city to study and is completely unaware of Shireen's love for him. He has feelings for Palwasha, his brother-in-law's sister. Other important characters include Aurang's sister (Bano) and her husband (Torah), Aurang's mother (Shameem), father (Gulistan Khan), and brothers (Saifullah and Goher).

== Plot ==
Sang-e-Mar Mar follows a Pashtun family, which is headed by Gulistan Khan and his wife Shameem. They have three sons—Safiullah, Aurang, and Goher—and a daughter, Bano. The drama begins with the death of Gulistan's aged father Baran Khan whom he kills with his own hands at Baran's request.

Gulistan follows strict Pashtun traditions, such as avoiding western clothing, which is considered a threat to Pashtun traditional values. Gulistan's youngest son Aurang was sent to Peshawar University and, unlike his elder siblings, possesses urban and literal views. His only emotional attachment is to his mother, who is the reason he often visits his village Garhi Baran.

A second storyline involves Shireen (nicknamed Shiri), the younger sister of Saif-ur-Rehman, a contractor. Shireen lives with her elder brother and his scheming and selfish wife, Pari. As a child, Shireen had a crush on Aurang when they studied at the same madrasa, but since both families live in different villages and Saif-ur-Rehman despises Gulistan, it has been difficult for Shireen and Aurang to interact.

The third storyline involves Gulistan Khan's daughter, Shehr Bano (nicknamed Bano), who is in a forced marriage with Torah Khan (her cousin) by his late grandfather. Bano is an abusive wife who hates her husband, as she feels she is too beautiful for him (because of her light skin and "pure" Pashtun heritage). Torah is Gulistan's nephew, and is ostracized by the family due to his mother's Bengali heritage.

The storylines converge with Gulistan's second son Goher, a womanizer who sets his sights on Durkhanay (Shireen's friend). He writes love letters to Durkhanay, who falls in love with him and confides to Shireen. Shireen warns Durkhanay in vain that he is conning her. Pari, Shireen's sister-in-law, manipulates Shireen. Torah finds out about Goher's love affair and sends one of his spies, Bulbul, after him. Goher meets Durkhanay by a stream where he tries to trap Durkhanay but she refuses to show her veiled face. Goher asks Durkhanay to meet him again next week, and gifts her with bangles and a pranda ('braid band').

Bulbul sees Goher and Durkhanay together. When she leaves for her home, Bulbul starts spying on her. Durkhanay goes to Shireen's home (typically known as Saif-ur-Rehman's home), and Bulbul mistakenly assumes that Shireen is the girl, and reports back to Torah. Meanwhile, Durkhanay shows Shireen the bangles and pranda and asks her to keep the pranda for herself. Despite Shireen's protests, Durkhanay ties the pranda in Shireen's braid. A village midwife arrives at Shireen's home to see Pari, who is pregnant. The woman, Gul, sells prandas and recognizes the pranda in Shireen's braid. She tells Pari that Gulistan's son bought the pranda from her some days ago for someone, and suggests Shireen must be having an affair with him. Pari plans to tell Saif-ur-Rehman so that Shireen is married off as soon as possible.

Torah decides to tell Saif-ur-Rehman about his sister's affair while Aurang plans to leave for Peshawar. Shireen and Durkhanay learn that Goher is Gulistan's son and that he is going to cheat Durkhanay, so both girls decide to return the gifts to him. Pari reveals that she "knows" about Shireen's affair, confronting her about it. This time, Shireen wants to go on behalf of Durkhanay to meet Goher and return the gifts, but Durkhanay insists she should go instead. Torah's spy lies to Saif-ur-Rehman about Shireen meeting Goher, and in a rage, he leaves to go kill them in the name of honor. Durkhanay returns the gifts to Goher and tells him that if he truly loves her to send a proposal to her house. He makes excuses and eventually tries to grab her. Saif-ur-Rehman arrives with his men, catch Goher, and kill him. They do not find Durkhanay, but Saif-ur-Rehman believes it was Shireen. Durkhanay is left heartbroken, and Shireen, Durkhanay, and Pari are the ones who know that Shireen is innocent. Shireen takes the blame for Durkhanay when she discovers the villagers have already been gossiping about her, and no one tells the truth.

Gulistan and his eldest son, Safiullah, are enraged by Goher's murder and decide to kill Saif-ur-Rehman when they find out that he is the killer. However, Pari goes to Gulistan, begs for mercy, and offers Shireen as vani. Shireen is overjoyed thinking that she is going to marry the love of her life, Aurang, but finds out that she has to marry Safiullah on her wedding day as the Mullah reads her nikah. Heartbroken and betrayed, she leaves to start her new life as Safiullah's wife and a woman who was given in vani. Shireen is harassed by Bano and Gulalai.

Shameem reveals to Aurang about Gulistan's past killing of his sister-in-law Rakhi (Torah's mother) because she wore a sari and danced in the rain, which he felt was inappropriate. Bulbul tells Safiullah that it was Goher who met with his new wife Shireen, not knowing it was actually Durkhanay.

Safiullah asks Aurang to secretly take Gulalai to the city to see a gynecologist. Shameem overhears and stops Aurang from taking Gulalai; if Gulistan found out, he would be angry, as he finds the city corrupt. Gulalai accuses Shireen of eavesdropping on the conversation and reporting it to Shameem. Although Shireen is innocent, Safiullah believes Gulalai and hits Shireen. Shameem tells Gulalai that Shireen did not report any conversation and forces Gulalai to apologize to Shiri for blaming her, and Gulalai gives a fake apology to Shireen and promises Shameem that she will not go to the city. Aurang witnesses Shireen's abuse, but only supports her on a minimal level. Gulalai leaves for her brother's house in another village at Gulistan's request. Gulalai and Safiullah have other plans: she is to leave with Aurang for the city from her brother's house.

Before Aurang leaves for the city, he and Shameem visit Bano. Aurang and Palwasha have a romantic conversation between them, and Bano interrupts angrily when Aurang says that he one day is going to marry Palwasha. When Bano tells her mother, Shameem is secretly happy but appeases Bano by telling her Aurang is not interested in marrying a village girl. Later, when an overjoyed Shameem tells this to Shireen, she is heartbroken but aware there is no future between her and Aurang, since she is his brother's wife. Shireen gives Palwasha the peacock feather that Aurang gave to Shiri when they were young, a sign that Shireen understands that Aurang is destined to be Palvasha's and not hers.

To get his revenge for his brother's death, Safiullah kills Saif-ur-Rehman, goaded on by Torah who eventually kills Saifullah, setting up the deaths of both Saif-ur-Rehman and Safiullah. Torah's true intentions are revealed as he wants to amass more property, believing it belonged to his own father, and despises Gulistan for killing his mother and the family for using him and making snide remarks about his mother and her skin colour, as well as his own. Aurang and Gulalai return to their village from the city, after discovering that she is only anaemic. On the way home, Gulalai is hit by a fast-approaching truck and dies. As the news of the three deaths is revealed to the respective families, everyone mourns.

Aurang is now the only remaining son of Gulistan, and the two repair their relationship. Gulistan reveals the "mad dog" that he feels is cursing his life, and partakes in the haram practice of usury. Shameem breaks down at dinner, begging Gulistan to stop taking interest under the guise of business; Aurang wraps all of his father's accounting books with the yellow sheet traditionally laid over someone that has been infected by rabies and burns them. Palvasha arrives at Aurang's house at night under the guise of bringing Shameem food, but Aurang sees through her attempts. Unbeknownst to them, Shireen stands outside and becomes heartbroken as they flirt.

Zarri, one of Pari's aunts, convinces her to set up her son, Kalimullah, with Durkhanay. Pari agrees in order to eliminate the last person who knows the truth about Goher's affair, and when Durkhanay's brother Sharifullah, a laborer from Dubai, arrives, he consents to the proposal. Durkhanay mourns the deaths happening around her and blames herself for Shireen's suffering; she goes to offer Shireen her condolences, and at her brother's request, vows to cheer her up. Shiri insists that Durkhanay look forward to the life ahead of herself instead of craving death, wistfully reciting the days of the wedding Durkhanay will have that Shiri herself did not experience. Meanwhile, Sharifullah stays in Pakistan and works for Pari as a zameendar, and at first wanted to remarry Shirreen, but is dissuaded by Pari's hateful words against her, who she resents again for having a share in Saif-ur-Rehman's will. Sharifullah forbids Durkhanay to visit Shireen again.

Gulistan asks a confused Shireen if she would like to marry Aurang. Durkhanay tells Sharifullah that she used to see Gauhar, not Shireen, and gives him a pistol and a Quraan, expecting him to kill her. He does not as he hears the call to prayer and decides against killing her. He says he would like to marry Shireen and Durkhanay, and he goes to Gulistan's house to ask for Shireen's hand in marriage without Pari's knowledge. When Durkhanay and Shireen meet, Shiri tells Durkhanay that her childhood dream of marrying Aurang is coming true. Durkhanay tells Shiri that her brother wants to marry Shireen after learning the truth, but after hearing about the possible match between Shiri and Aurang, she backs off and is happy for her.

The relationship between Gulistan and Aurang slightly improves but Aurang overhears his father telling Shameemm that he killed Baran Khan as a mercy killing. He is angry and leaves the house. Pari hears about Aurang and Shireen's match and contacts Bano, who tells Aurang that Shireen is "impure" and is responsible for the murders of Safiullah and Gauhar because her warped thoughts are suggesting that Shireen is responsible for all her problems. Pari falsely swears on the Quran and subsequently gives birth to a stillborn child. She slowly loses touch with reality and becomes completely delusional. Durkhanay sees this and is afraid of her own fate since she also has concealed the truth. She goes to Garhi Baran and speaks to Gulistan. Meanwhile, Aurang tells Shireen that he has never loved her but fell in love with Palwasha for as long as he knew what love was. Shireen becomes angry and curses Aurang. As she appears to have lost everything, she holds scissors to Bano's throat after Bano taunts her about telling everyone she was responsible for all her brother's deaths. Bano causes a commotion and tells everyone that Shireen attacked her. Shireen lies and tells everyone that she is indeed responsible for the death of Gauhar since she was the one who had an affair with him. Shameem slaps her and Bano attacks her with a stick while Aurang, Palwasha, Gulistan Khan, Shamim and Torah quietly watch this happen. Torah intervenes after getting flashbacks of his mother being beaten by Gulistan. When Bano hits Torah in the head, Palwasha stops Aurang from intervening.

Durkhanay arrives with the letter that Goher gave her and confesses the entire truth about Goher. Upon hearing this, everyone feels stricken. Shameem begs for Shireen's forgiveness on a prayer mat, as Aurang leaves for the city with Palwasha. Torah asks Shireen to marry him as he is tired of getting bullied for his skin colour, but Shireen refuses. A day later, Torah tells Bano that if she does anything wrong he will divorce her in the name of Allah; at that moment, Shireen arrives and says she accepts Torah's request for marriage. Bano, heartbroken, goes to her father's house. The day after, Torah wants Shireen to wear his mother's sari but is uncomfortable with the idea and makes excuses. He tells her he would help her and slaps her saying that she tried to hurt his sister Palwasha by loving Aurang. Both of them go to Gulistan's house; where after Shireen goes inside, he points his gun at Gulistan to avenge his mother's death, saying that if he did not let Bano go with him, he will kill him just like he killed Safiullah and Goher. As he is about to shoot Gulistan, Shameem overhears that Torah Khan killed her sons, and shoots and kills him, claiming that she took Safiullah's and Goher's deaths in revenge.

== Cast ==
- Noman Ejaz as Gulistan Khan: husband of Shameem, father of Aurang, Bano, Safiullah, Goher, and the father-in-law of Torah, Shireen and Gulalai
- Sania Saeed as Shameem: wife of Gulistan Khan, mother of Aurang, Bano, Safiullah, Goher, and the mother-in-law of Torah and Gulalai
- Mikaal Zulfiqar as Aurangzeb "Aurang" Khan: the youngest son of Shameem and Gulistan Khan and the love interest of Shireen and Palwasha.
- Kubra Khan as Shireen: the younger sister of Saif Ur Rehman who has a crush on Aurang and widow of Safiullah and wife of Torah.
- Omair Rana as Safiullah Khan: the oldest son of Shameem and Gulistan Khan and Gulalai's husband
- Paras Masroor as Torah Khan: the deceiving nephew of Gulistan Khan; ostracised for his Bengali heritage
- Shermeen Ali as Palwasha: the sister of Torah who also has a crush on Aurang
- Uzma Hassan as Shehrbano "Bano": the good for nothing sister of Aurang and the wife of Torah
- Beenish Raja as Durkhanay: Shireen's best friend who is Goher's love interest
- Tipu Sharif as Saif Ur Rehman: a contractor and Shireen's older brother
- Kaif Ghaznavi as Pari: the good for nothing wife of Saif Ur Rehman and the sister-in-law of Shireen
- Najiba Faiz as Gulalai: wife of Safiullah and the daughter-in-law of Shameem and Gulistan Khan
- Agha Mustafa Hassan as Goher Khan: the middle son of Shameem and Gulistan Khan and a womanizer who is in love with Durkhanay
- Naik Muhammad as Kaleemullah
- Abdullah Khan as Baru Kaka: the driver of Saif Ur Rehman
- Khalida Yasmeen as Zareen: Kaleemullah's mother
- Hassan Noman as Bulbul
- Zahida Tanha as Gul Bibi
- Shaharyar Irfan as Subhan: Aurang's best friend
- Iffat Siddiqui as Durkhanay's mother
- Arshad Hussain as Shareefullah: Durkhanay's brother
- Ahmed Ali
- Nasir
- Amjad
- Shehzad Khalil

=== Guest appearance ===
- Qazi Wajid as Baran Khan: Gulistan Khan's father (seen only in flashbacks)
- Suhaee Abro as Rakshi: Torah's and Palwasha's mother (seen only in flashbacks)

=== Child stars ===
- Wajdan as Aurang
- Roshina as Shireen
- Dilawar Khan as Goher
- Sanan as Bano
- M Asad Khan as Saif Ur Rehman
- Ijaz Gul as Nakli Angraiz

== Production ==
=== Development ===
Sang-e-Mar Mar was developed by Hum TV's senior producer Momina Duraid of MD Productions. The channel hired the director Saife Hassan to direct the series who previously directed Tum Mere Paas Raho for the same channel. The story of the series was Written by Mustafa Afridi who also wrote the series such as Firaaq and Aseerzadi for the channel while script composing is done by Muhammad Wasi-ul-Din who previously scripted Diyar-e-Dil. The show approximately airs weekly episode for 35–40 minutes (minus commercials) every Thursday.

Song composition is done by Sahir Ali Bagga who previously composed Sajna ve Sajna for channel's 2016 series Udaari. while background music is given by MAD Music. Rahat Fateh Ali Khan was finalised to perform the OST, it marks his return to Hum TV after he performed the OST of Zara Yaad Kar. The series was given the Pakeezah time slot of Thursdays 8:00pm.

=== Casting ===
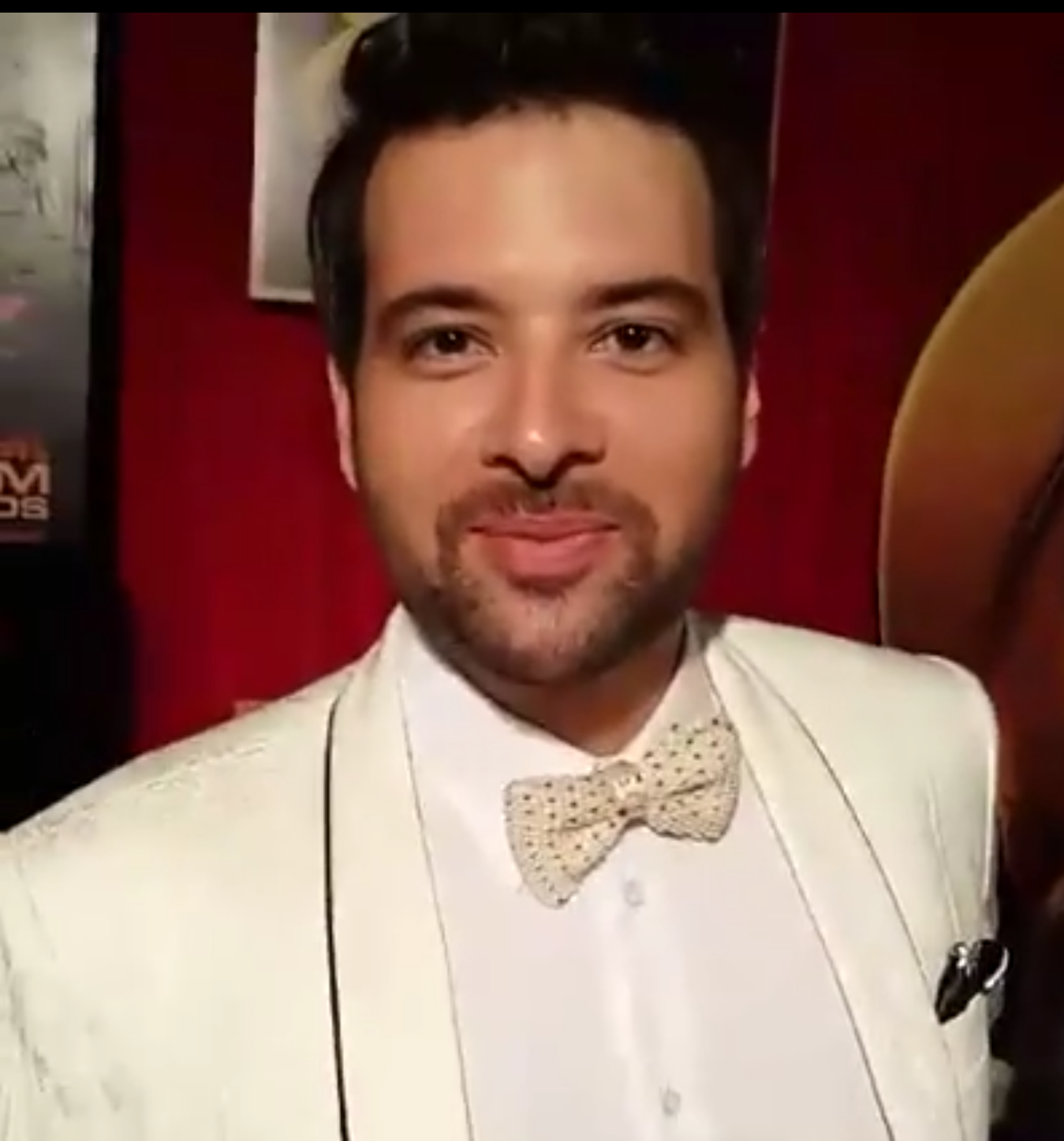
Mikaal Zulfiqar plays the male lead

Producer Momina Duraid, and director Saife Haasan mutually chose the cast which includes Mikaal Zulfiqar, From 2015, Zulfiqar was given several shows for the channel including Diyar-e-Dil, Maan and Sangat all of which were a commercial success for the channel itself, after channels 2015's success in Sangat, Zulfiqar once again was finalised to portray the role of Aurang. Alongside Zulfiqar, Kubra Khan was finalised to portray Shireen, marking her television debut by this serial. Khan was finalised to portray the character after her debut performance in 2014 film Na Maloom Afraad. The role was earlier offered to Armeena Rana Khan who could not play it due to date issues.

Veteran actors Noman Ijaz and Sania Saeed were finalised to portray Gulistan Khan and Shameen respectively, marking their fourth on-screen appearance as a couple after Jhumka Jaan, Khamoshiyan and Aao Kahani Buntay Hain. Uzma Hassan was selected to portray Shehrbano, marking her second appearance with Ijaz and Saeed after Aao Kahani Bunatay Hain and her second with Tipu Sharif as well after Mohabbat Aag Si. The actress also made her second appearance with Zulfiqar after her appearance in Tum Meray Hi Rehna. Theater actor Paras Masroor was selected to portray a negative role of Tora Khan, earlier offered to director Mohammed Ehteshamuddin, who rejected it due his date clashes as he was on the shoot of Udaari at that time. Actor Omair Rana was selected to portray the character of Safiullah, who made her third appearance with Mikaal Zulfiqar after Maan and Tum Mere Kya Ho. Sharmeen Ali and Kaif Ghaznavi were selected to play supporting roles of Plawasha and Pari respectively while PTV famed actress and host Najiba Faiz was chosen to play Gulalai.

=== Filming and locations ===
The entire production was shot in the Swat District, mainly in the village of Ronyal and its outskirts.

== Music ==
"Sang-e-Mar Mar OST"

Song by Rahat Fateh Ali Khan
- Language: Urdu
- Released: 26 August 2016
- Recorded: 2016
- Genre: Television soundtrack
- Length: 4:50
- Label: M.D Productions
- Producer: Momina Duraid

The title song of Sang-e-Mar Mar was composed by musician Sahir Ali Bagga. The lines of the song are frequently used during the course of the show. The original soundtrack was released on 28 September 2016. The song along with production is produced by Momina Duraid under her production company M.D Productions.

First half soundtrack teaser of the serial was released on 13 August 2016 while full soundtrack was released on 26 August 2016. The OST of the serial received critical acclaim and became the best television OST for 2017 Television season.

=== Track listing ===
All lyrics are written by Imran Raza; all music is composed by Sahir Ali Bagga.

| No. | Title | Artist(s) | Length |
|---|---|---|---|
| 1. | "Sang-e-Mar Mar" | Rahat Fateh Ali Khan | 4:50 |

== Broadcast and release ==
=== Broadcast ===
Sang-e-Mar Mar premiered on 1 September 2016. Sang-e-Mar Mar airs a weekly episode on every Thursday succeeding Pakeezah, starting from its premiere date, with time slot of 8:00 pm. It was aired on Hum Europe in UK, on Hum TV USA in USA and Hum TV Mena on UAE, with same timings and premiered date. All International broadcasting aired the series in accordance with their standard timings.

The show was dubbed in Pashto and was broadcast by Hum Pashto 1 under the title سنک مرمر in 2020.

=== Digital release and streaming service ===
Sang-e-Mar Mar was also uploaded on YouTube alongside its airing on TV but In 2017, Hum Network protected all its episodes from YouTube and the series had no episodes available in the Pakistani region. iflix contracted Hum Network and screened all of Hum TV's Shows after syndication, the series remained the part of the same contract. In April 2020, the drama serial was made available on Hum TV's Official site. It is also available on Indian streaming platform MX Player.

== Reception ==
=== Episode ranking (TRPs) ===
Sang-e-Mar Mar episode rankings in the PAK television market
| Ep # | Airing date | TRP | rank | ref. |
|---|---|---|---|---|
| 11 | 10 November 2016 | 5.6 | #1 | |
| 13 | 24 November 2016 | 5.9 | #1 | |
| 14 | 1 December 2016 | 5.7 | #1 | |
| 15 | 8 December 2016 | 5.0 | #1 | |
| 16 | 15 December 2016 | 4.7 | #1 | |
| 17 | 22 December 2016 | 4.3 | #1 | |
| 23 | 2 February 2017 | 5.3 | #1 | |
| 24 | 9 February 2017 | 4.2 | #1 | |
| 26 | 23 February 2017 | 3.9 | #1 | |
| 28 | 9 March 2017 | 6.1 | #1 | |

=== Critical reception ===
Sadaf Haider of Dawn praised Sang-e-Mar Mar saying it is the best critique about honor. Express Tribune wrote, "What's brilliant about the play is that it uncovers the various social connotations that go into the construct of ‘honour’. The play doesn't offer judgment but humanises characters and shows just how powerful the effect of revenge can be."

Writing for Express Tribune, Mahwash Badar called it a MASTERPIECE and praised the writing of Mustafa Afridi and performances of Sania Saeed and Noman Ijaz stating, "The drama heartrendingly explains how abuse becomes a set DYNAMIC IN HOUSEHOLDS and how it ruins so many families and lives. The performances are categorically flawless and no doubt we see that Sania Saeed and Noman Ijaz are one of the best actors of our generation". Rizina Bhutto of HIP praised the stellar performances and storyline of the serial stating, "It is a well-made drama serial with beautiful locations, simple dialogues, strong performances, and a gripping story".

Sadaf Haider of DAWN Images praised the Sang-e-Mar Mar's direction and writing stating, "Like the recent Udaari, this serial is set on a broad canvas, touching on social issues, exploring the lives of many characters; introducing us to a world as cold and beautiful as the marble in its title." While reviewing 10th episode of the serial, Mahwah Ajaz of The Nation praised the series's dialogues and writing saying, "The dialogues in the play and the situations depicted are brutal and honest and heartbreaking."

== Sequel ==
In June 2021, Saife Hassan revealed in an exclusive interview that he was set to revive the serial Sang-e-Mar Mar with a sequel, titled as 'Sang-e-Mah'. The series premiered on 22 January 2022 and feature cast of Nauman Ijaz, Sania Saeed, Samiya Mumtaz, Atif Aslam, Kubra Khan and Hania Amir. It is basically a trilogy including the upcoming third sequel 'Sang-e-Siyah'. Sang-e-Mah was to be the debut of the singer Atif Aslam on television.

== Accolades ==
| Year | Award | Date | Category | Recipient(s) | Result | Ref. |
|---|---|---|---|---|---|---|
| 2017 | Hum Awards | 29 April 2017; 22 July 2017 (televised) | Best Supporting Actress | Sania Saeed | Won | |
| 2017 | Hum Awards | 29 April 2017; 22 July 2017 (televised) | Best Supporting Actor | Paras Masroor | Won | |
| 2017 | Hum Awards | 29 April 2017; 22 July 2017 (televised) | Most Impactful Character | Noman Ejaz | Won | |
| 2017 | Hum Awards | 29 April 2017; 22 July 2017 (televised) | Best Writer Drama Serial | Mustafa Afridi | Won | |
| 2017 | Hum Awards | 29 April 2017; 22 July 2017 (televised) | Best Drama Serial | Momina Duraid | Nominated | |
| 2017 | Hum Awards | 29 April 2017; 22 July 2017 (televised) | Best Drama Serial Popular | Momina Duraid | Nominated | |
| 2017 | Hum Awards | 29 April 2017; 22 July 2017 (televised) | Best Director Drama Serial | Saife Hassan | Nominated | |
| 2017 | Hum Awards | 29 April 2017; 22 July 2017 (televised) | Best Actor | Mikaal Zulfiqar | Nominated | |
| 2017 | Hum Awards | 29 April 2017; 22 July 2017 (televised) | Best Actor Popular | Mikaal Zulfiqar | Nominated | |
| 2017 | Hum Awards | 29 April 2017; 22 July 2017 (televised) | Best Actor in a Negative Role | Uzma Hassan | Nominated | |
| 2017 | Hum Awards | 29 April 2017; 22 July 2017 (televised) | Best Onscreen Couple | Mikaal Zulfiqar and Kubra Khan | Nominated | |
| 2017 | Hum Awards | 29 April 2017; 22 July 2017 (televised) | Best Onscreen Couple Popular | Mikaal Zulfiqar and Kubra Khan | Nominated | |
| 2017 | Hum Awards | 29 April 2017; 22 July 2017 (televised) | Best Original Soundtrack Popular | Sang-e-Mar Mar | Nominated | |
| 2018 | Lux Style Awards | 20 February 2018 | Best TV Director | Saife Hassan | Won | |
| 2018 | Lux Style Awards | 20 February 2018 | Best TV Writer | Mustafa Afridi | Won | |
| 2018 | Lux Style Awards | 20 February 2018 | Best TV Play | Sang-e-Mar Mar | Nominated | |

== See also ==
- List of programs broadcast by Hum TV
- 2016 in Pakistani television
