= List of Numm episodes =

The following is the list of episodes for Geo television drama serial Numm. The drama serial formally began 24 August 2013. Individual episodes are numbered.

Set in 2013, Wali Bakht is an Oxford graduate, belongs to a traditional, strict feudal family, his grandfather Sikander Bakht (Bade Sahab) is the head of family and decision maker, after the death of Wali's father in his childhood due to unreveal circumstances his mother become mentally ill and Wali's get married with a girl named Mahjabeen triple of his age to take care of him, through the illegal costume vani. After his return from London he is forced to remarried with Neelum Akbar Khan to maintained and for the survival of his creed, Neelum is a daughter of Wali's uncle, a rebel and proud girl who hates her family customs and traditions and want to get rid off, but fate doesn't allow her and she marries Wali. Mahjabeen has its position in house nothing more than of servant and she seems to happily perform her duties toward Wali and his house, In future it will reveal what actually has happened with family in past, for now story is revolving around three characters Wali, Neelum and Mahjabeen.

== Series overview ==
Series	Episodes	Originally released			Direction	Screenplay	Lead Cast
Series	Episodes	First released	Last released	Network	Direction	Screenplay	Lead Cast
1	6	24 August 2013	28 September 2013	Geo TV	Ahson Talish	Myra Sajid	Fawad Khan; Sania Saeed; Kanza Wayne; Usman Peerzada

== Episodes ==
No. overall	No. in season	Title	Setting	Original release date
1	1	"Introduction"	2013	24 August 2013
After graduating from England, Wali Bakht returns home and meets Mahjabeen to whom he was married in childhood. Sikander Bakht announces that Wali will have to marry Neelum to whom he was betrothed as a child. Both Neelum and Wali do not want to marry each other. Sikander threatens Wali to marry Neelum.
2	2	"Wali and Neelum Marriage"	2013	31 August 2013
Neelum and Wali get married. Neelum taunts Mahjabeen for being her co-wife. Neelum's family visits Bakht house and did breakfast with them. Amtul scolds Neelum. Wali tells Sikander that Neelum is not suitable for their family. Sikander asks Neelum and Wali about their honeymoon. Neelum misbehaves with Sikander and antagonizes him.
3	3	"Conflict between Neelum and Wali"	2013	7 September 2013
Neelum continue her unawareness and carelessness towards house and wali. Bare Sahab is patient with the behaviour of Neelum as he is confident that she will be adapted to Hawayli's environment and customs. Neelum orders servant to seek her permission only in any task just in fit of rage with Mahjabeen. Mahjabeen reflects on her past, revealing she loves someone related to bare Sahab family, Mahjabeen and bare Sahab have conversation while Wali tries to talk with Neelum about the things going in ways, but, due to her altitude from the wedding day he gets furious and slap Neelum as she didn't pay any attention.
4	4	"Neelum Disappearance"	2013	14 September 2013
Shocked Neelum leaves the house after the incident at night, Mahjabeen gets worried about her disappearance as she feels herself responsible for this, Wali went out in search of Neelum meanwhile worried Mahjabeen once again draws back in her past where shows that she and her lover were about to get married, Wali returned home as he fails to find her. Next day, sister (school's principal) calls Neelum's mother from her boarding school to inform her that she is in school. Wali and Farhat went to school to meet Neelum, sister tell Wali about Neelum and her personality, while Farhat tries to convince neelum to come home as her grandmother is not well, she didn't listen as she thinks that her mother emotionally blackmailing her, in fit of fury Neelum saw Wali and run toward woods, but Wali catch her and apologize to her for his behaviour.
5	5	"Neelum's Grandmother Death"	2013	21 September 2013
Neelum returns to her house along Wali and her mother, both meet Ammu (Neelum's grandmother) as she became contented to see her granddaughter, Ammu makes Wali understand about their marital life and how to conceive their relationship in future. Wali returns to his home and ordered servants and Mahjabeen not to give any information of house to Bade Sahab, disheartened by the behavior of Wali once again Mahjabeen fallen between cracks in her past where she reminisces of Wali's childhood. Neelum prepares to return to her in-laws' house but death of Ammu shattered her, Neelum gets upset to see Mahjabeen on Ammu's soyem, Wali and Neelum visit Ammu's grave. At the end of episode it was shown that, Mahjabeen met a boy in clandestineness who seems both have some strong consanguinity as Mahjabeen was very fond of that boy.
6	6	"Mahjabeen Antecedent"	2013	28 September 2013
After Neelum's Ammu death, Wali leaves Neelum at her hostel as they decided Neelum would be educated after marriage. Bade Sahab met with his friends on issues of properties. Mahjabeen waited for Wali the whole night as they didn't come, in while she lost in hers past, Mahjabeen, where it was shown that guy with whom Mahjabeen was about to get married, was upset, as she cannot spoke about relation with him, until he first seeks permission for his marriage with her to Bade sahab. Wali come home next day, Mahjabeen asked him where he was, he scolded Mahjabeen and ask her not to interfere in his life or in Hawayli he also stated that her duty has over now for which she was brought.
