= Piyari Bittu =

- Written by: Saji Gul
- Directed by: Mazhar Moin
- Starring: Sania Saeed; Atiqa Odho; Saniya Shamshad
- Theme music composer: Wajid Saeed
- Opening theme: Rahat Fateh Ali Khan
- Country of origin: Pakistan
- Original language: Urdu
- No. of episodes: 28

Production
- Producers: Musharaf Jaffery; Naveed Arshad
- Camera setup: multi-camera setup
- Running time: 35-40 minutes

Original release
- Network: Express Entertainment
- Release: 9 September 2017 – 24 March 2018

Piyari Bittu (transl. Dear Bittu), is a Pakistani psychological drama television series, written by Saji Gul, directed by Mazhar Moin and aired on Express Entertainment from September 2017 to March 2018. It features Saniya Shamshad in the title role of Bittu with Atiqa Odho and Sania Saeed in pivotal roles, in their second project together since Sitara Aur Mehrunnisa. It deals with the subject of the complexity of human relations and people suffering from Alzheimer's disease.

== Plot ==
Shakra loves her niece Bittu very much who suffers from Alzheimer's disease. Bittu's father is also very ill and is on his deathbed. Bittu's mother, Sakina is very clever and has greedy nature who does nothing expect pray for the death of her husband. Before his death, Bittu's father takes promise from his sister Shakra that she will takes care of Bittu after him. After his death, Sakina marries another man and takes Bittu with her. She then marries Bittu with a pshyco man in return of heavy amount. When Shakra finds out she goes and brings Bittu back with her. She sacrifices her all happiness for Bittu and even ignores her husband and children without knowing that in near future all of her sacrifices will cause troubles for him.

== Cast ==
- Saniya Shamshad as Bittu
- Sania Saeed as Shakra
- Atiqa Odho as Shakila
- Farah Shah as Rukhsana
- Nayyar Ejaz as Bittu's father
- Rashid Farooqui as Mushtaq
- Fawad Khan as Mehboob
- Kaif Ghaznavi as Shazia
- Tipu Sharif as Shahid
- Shamim Hilaly as Mehboob's mother
- Zaib Rehman as Khala
- Fazal Hussain as Adil

== Production ==
The series marked the collaboration of Saeed and Odho after 25 years, previously appeared in Anwar Maqsood's Sitara Aur Mehrunnisa in 1992. Director Mazhar Moin cast Odho and Saeed together by chance, with Saeed playing Shakira, and was delighted when she agreed, realizing they'd work together after a long time.

== Reception ==
Fouzia Nasir Ahmad of the Dawn listed the series among those having a different story from the others.
