= Kalmoohi =

Kalmoohi may refer to:

- Kalmoohi (2010 TV series), a Pakistani TV drama
- Kalmoohi (2013 TV series), a Pakistani TV drama
