= Phir Chand Pe Dastak =

- Title screen
- Genre: Comedy
- Written by: Mustafa Afridi
- Directed by: Saife Hassan
- Starring: Qavi Khan; Durdana Butt; Mehwish Hayat; Azfar Rehman; Javeria Abbasi; Nida Khan; Ayesha Gul
- Theme music composer: Sohail Haider
- Opening theme: Song written & performed by Sohail Haider
- Country of origin: Pakistan
- Original language: Urdu
- No. of episodes: 29

Production
- Editor: Kashif Ahmed
- Running time: ~21 minutes

Original release
- Network: Hum TV
- Release: 2 August – 30 August 2011

Related
- Chand Pe Dastak

Phir Chand Pe Dastak (Urdu: پھر چاند پہ دستک, lit. 'A Knock on the Moon Again') is a comedy drama directed by Saife Hassan and written by Mustafa Afridi. It broadcast on Hum TV during Ramadan 1432, from 2 August 2011, to 30 August 2011. It is a sequel to the Ramadan special Chand Pe Dastak which was broadcast during Ramadan the previous year.

== Cast ==
- Qavi Khan
- Durdana Butt
- Khalid Anam
- Seemi Pasha
- Shama Askari
- Mehwish Hayat
- Azfar Rehman
- Javeria Abbasi
- Ihtisham Uddin
- Danish Nawaz
- Tabbasum Arif as Rozi's mother
- Ayesha Gul
- Nida Khan
- Akbar Khan
- Amber Nausheen
- Aamir Qureshi
