= Kalmoohi (2010 TV series) =

Pakistani television series

- Urdu: کلموہی
- Based on: Chokher Bali by Rabindranath Tagore
- Written by: Seemal Nauman
- Directed by: Sarmad Sultan Khoosat
- Creative director: Kanwal Khoosat
- Starring: Sania Saeed; Sohail Sameer; Shamil Khan; Samina Peerzada
- Country of origin: Pakistan
- Original language: Urdu
- No. of episodes: 15

Production
- Producer: Irfan Khoosat

Original release
- Network: PTV Home
- Release: 13 February 2010 – 2010

Kalmoohi (Urdu: کلموہی, lit. 'Ill-Omened') is a Pakistani television series directed by Sarmad Sultan Khoosat and based on Rabindranath Tagore's Chokher Bali. It stars Sania Saeed as a widow and the series depicts her relationship with three individuals, two friends played by Shamil Khan and Sohail Sameer and a friend of her own played by Seemab Muzaffar. The series premiered on 13 February 2010 on PTV Home.

== Plot ==
Noor Bano is a young widow and a deep human being, living in a hostel in Murree. Her tragic past disturbs her mentally. She has an emotional relationship with Nun Josephine, and they have great affection for each other. In Sheikhupura, the matriarchs of a haveli, Sultana and Saeeda (called Bey Ji by her children), decide to marry the former's step-son Adil to Sultana's orphan niece Aliya, who lives in Lahore with her uncle Faheem. However, Bey Ji's spoiled and only son Shani gets attracted to her beauty and wants to marry her. Bey Ji doesn't want to break Adil's heart by doing so, but takes this step forcefully when Shani goes away, leaving the house. She also convinces Adil to agree to the marriage.

Noor Bano, the daughter of Saeeda's deceased childhood friend, comes to attend the wedding and actively takes part in the preparations. She helps Bey Ji with the household work and Aliya with her marital and personal affairs. After the marriage, Shani starts spending more time with his wife and, consequently, gets away from Bey Ji. Bey Ji gets angry over it and reprimands him in front of everyone through Adil. Due to Noor Bano's helpful behavior towards Aliya, the latter becomes attached to her. They become good friends and start calling each other by the common nickname 'Kalmoohi'.

When Bey Ji rebukes Aliya for not knowing housework, she starts learning things. Upon observing his wife too busy with work, Shani forbids Bey Ji from making Aliya do housework and insists she will study further instead. Bey Ji again gets angry with Shani, and he becomes busy teaching English to Aliya. Bey Ji asks Adil to make him understand, but they become bitter when they face each other.

Mother Josephine sends a letter to Noor Bano, and she returns to Murree. To avoid the conflict in her house, Bey Ji goes to Farooqabad, her ancestral house. After her departure, Sultana's foot gets injured, after which Aliya has to manage all the work. As she becomes unable to manage the work, Sultana goes to Lahore, to Faheem's house. Adil brings Bey Ji back to the haveli, and Noor Bano also returns from Murree. Upon her return, several incidents related to her force Shani to think about her, and he gets attracted to her.

Noor Bano decides to organize a picnic for the family, and she, along with Aliya, Adil, and Shani, goes to Hiran Minar, where Aliya notices her husband's inclination towards Noor Bano. On their return to the haveli, Shani tells Aliya that Noor Bano is becoming a part of their lives, and without her, it will be difficult to live. She suggests that they should get Noor Bano and Adil married so that she can never go away from them. However, a misunderstanding arises between Shani and Aliya, and he sends her to Lahore to spend a few days there.

Shani is then completely lured by Noor Bano, and, unwillingly, she too feels the same. He tells her that he loves her, but she shows hesitation, as she had a soft spot for Adil in her heart. Aliya wants to return to Sheikhupura, but Shani forbids her. She returns by herself at night and catches Shani and Noor Bano red-handed, engaged in a close conversation in the room at night. Bey Ji gets angry and blames Noor Bano solely for it. She, in return, tries to inform her about the nature of her son, who had an eye on her since her arrival, but she doesn't want to hear anything. She instantly leaves the haveli and goes to Adil, who drops her at the station in the morning to leave for Murree.

Upon reaching Murree, she shares the incident with Mother Josephine, who tells her it's her fault. Shani reaches Murree too, after her. She denies him and tells him to go back to pursue her married life. Later, she calls Adil and apologizes.

== Cast ==
- Sania Saeed as Noor Bano
- Samina Peerzada as Mother Josephine
- Sohail Sameer as Dr. Adil
- Shamil Khan as Shayaan "Shani"
- Kinza Malik as Sultana "Bee Ji"
- Nasreen Qureshi as Saeeda "Bey Ji"
- Seemab Muzaffar as Aliya
- Tasneem Kausar as Attiya
- Irfan Khoosat as Faheem
- Rashid Mehmood as Sohrab

== Production ==
After completing the shooting of Khamoshiyan and The Ghost, Saeed was approached by Sarmad Sultan Khoosat to play a seductress in the adaptation of Rabindranath Tagore's Chokher Bali. Khoosat described it as a Kitchen-centered adaptation of Tagore's novel. The series was produced by Irfan Khoosat, while Kanwal Khoosat served as the art director. Principal photography and post-production wrapped up in late January 2010.
