= Ronyal =

Coordinates: 34°57′N 72°22′E

- Village
- Interactive map of Ronyal
- Country: Pakistan
- Province: Khyber Pakhtunkhwa
- District: Swat

Population (2017)
  - Total: 8,650
- Time zone: UTC+5 (PST)

Ronyal or also referred to as Ronial, Runial or Rondyal is a village, situated in the Sebujnei area of Swat Valley's Matta Tehsil, which is an administrative unit of the Swat Valley, known as Union council, of Swat District in the Khyber Pakhtunkhwa province of Pakistan.

In the Pakistan Army's Operation Rah-e-Rast against terrorists in Swat (back in 2008), this village was the settlement of the Pakistan Army's Brigade and was proved to be the best control hubs in the operation for reconnaissance and surveillance due to its strategic location.

== See also ==
- Swat District
- Sange Mar Mar
