= Mobile Jin =

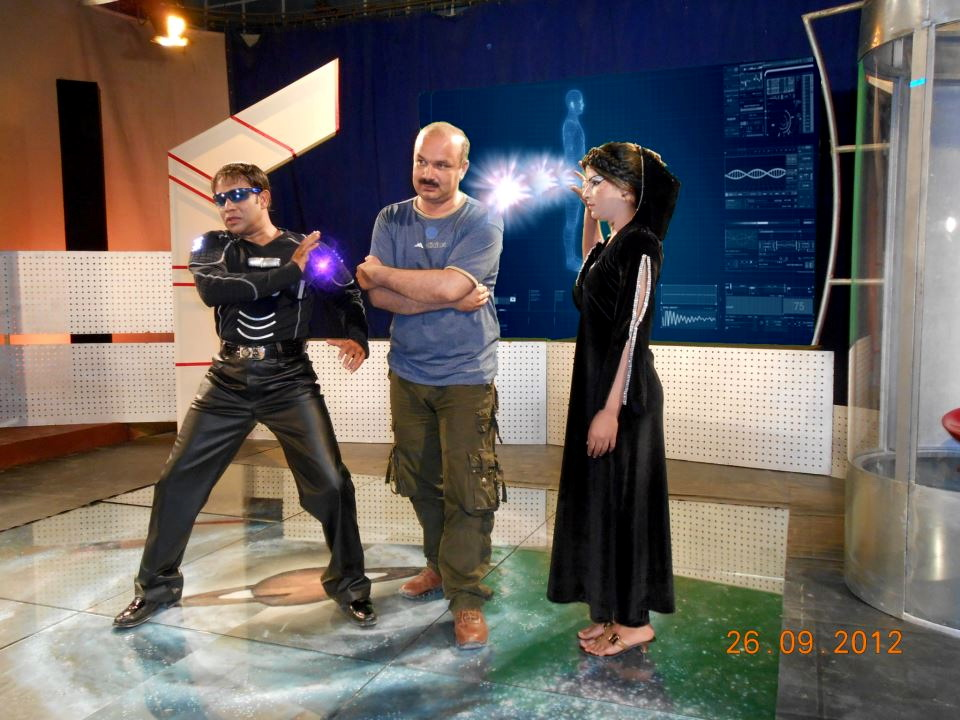
- Mobile Jin Pakistan's Superhero (Kids drama serial by PTV)
- Written by: Riaz Sagar
- Directed by: Gul Shah Bukhari
- Starring: Riaz Sagar; Ashraf Sulehri; Aisha; S. M Afzal; Nighat Riaz; Fiza Gill; Gul Ahmed Gul
- Country of origin: Pakistan
- Original language: Urdu

Production
- Producer: Gul Shah Bukhari
- Production location: Quetta
- Cinematography: Nasir William
- Editor: Hashim Kurd
- Running time: 25 Minutes each episode
- Production company: PTV Quetta Center

Original release
- Network: PTV Home
- Release: 14 March 2013

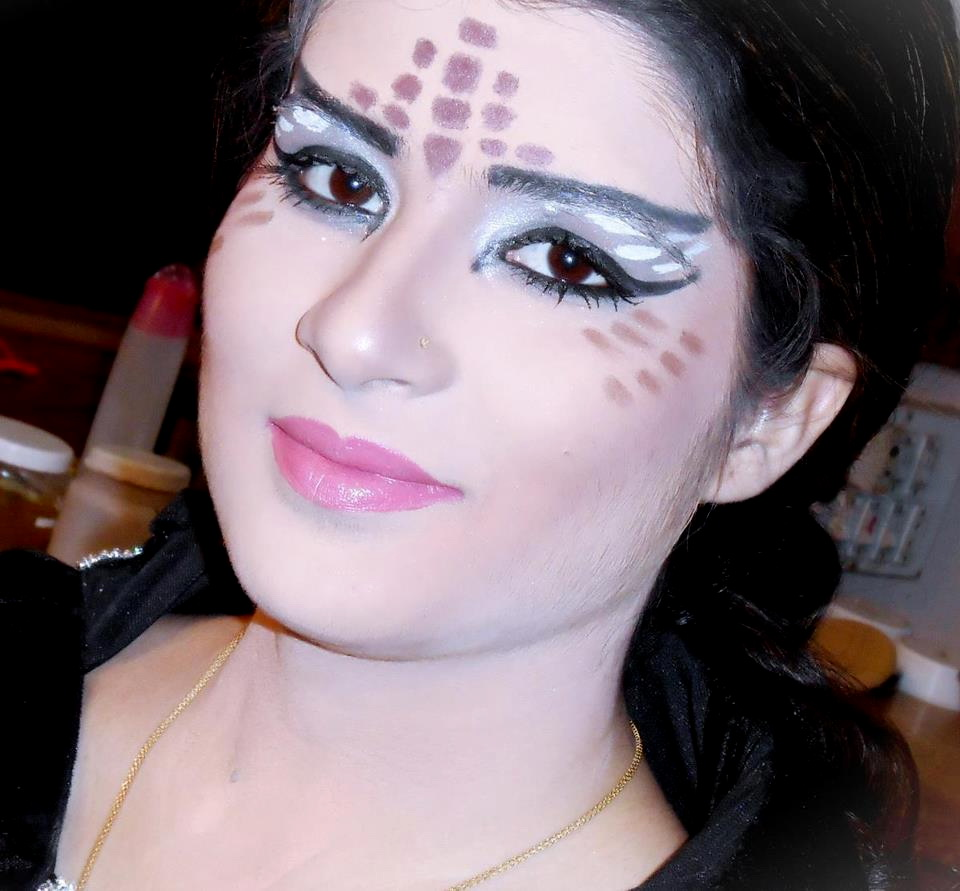
Yurika ..... The Alien Lady

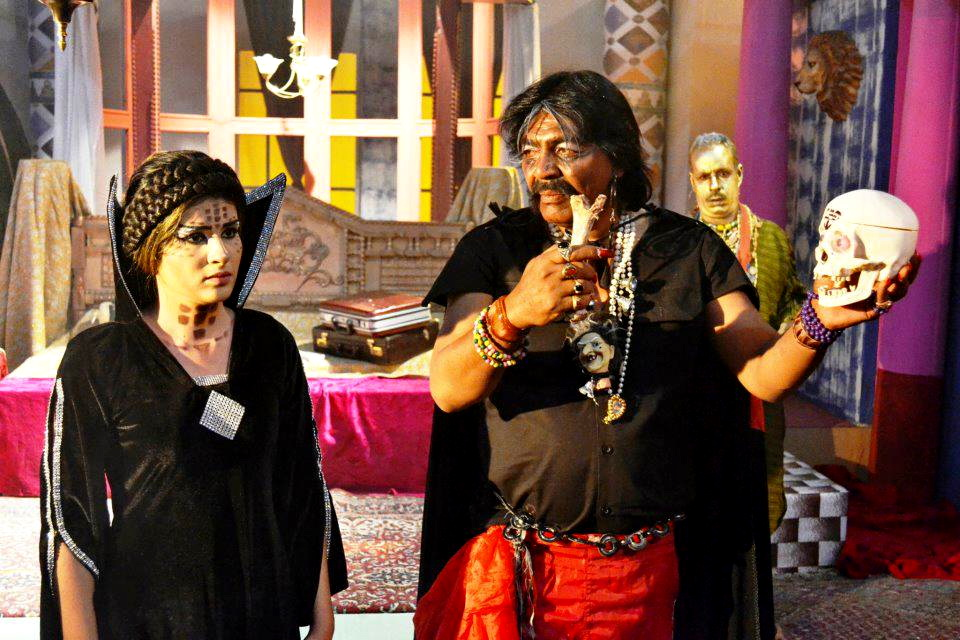
Yurika & Lal Jadugar

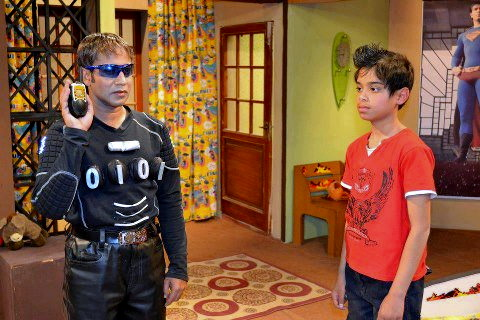
Mobile Jin & Babloo

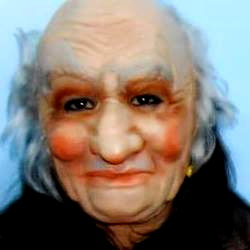
Mask Lady

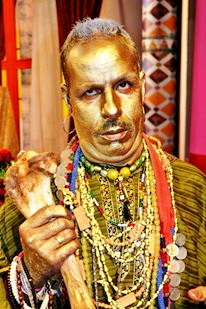
Mangoo Jadugar

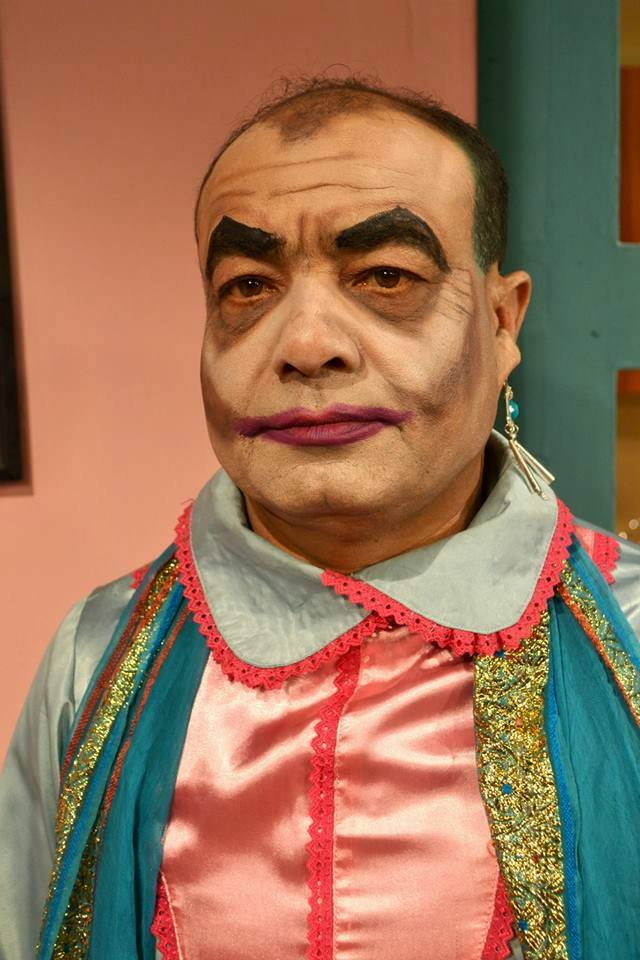
Lali Jadugar

Mobile Jin (Urdu: موبائل جن, English: Mobile Genie) is a 2013 Pakistani children's fantasy television serial aired on PTV Home. The serial is directed by Gul Shah Bukhari and written by Riaz Sagar.

Mashhood Bin Shahzad is the hero of this drama. The cast includes:

- Riaz Sagar
- Ashraf Sulehri
- Aisha
- S. M Afzal
- Nighat Riaz
- Fiza Gill
- Gul Ahmed Gul
- Abas Malik
- Asad Khan Kakar
- Samroon
- Behroz
- Kanwal
- Ramzan
- Neelam
