= Numm =

Pakistani TV series

- Television release poster
- Also known as: Urdu: نم
- Genre: Drama
- Written by: Myra Sajid
- Directed by: Ahson Talish
- Creative director: Hamza Ansari
- Starring: Fawad Khan; Sania Saeed; Kanza Wayne; Usman Peerzada; Farah Shah; Munazzah Arif
- Theme music composer: Muhammad Agha
- Opening theme: "Mumkin hai chashm-e-nam" by Faiza Mujahid
- Composer: Muhammad Agha
- Country of origin: Pakistan
- Original language: Urdu
- No. of seasons: 1
- No. of episodes: 18 (list of episodes)

Production
- Executive producer: Saleem Memon
- Producer: Amjad Hashmi
- Production location: Karachi
- Cinematography: Sajad Kashmiri
- Editor: Numan Anwar
- Camera setup: Multi-camera setup
- Running time: 43 minutes
- Production companies: Agha Talish Productions; Q Links Post Productions

Original release
- Network: Geo Entertainment
- Release: 24 August – 28 September 2013

Numm (Urdu: نم) is a 2013 Pakistani drama serial that portrays social issues. It was directed by Ahson Talish, produced by Amjad Hashmi and written by Myra Sajid. The show stars Fawad Khan, Sania Saeed and Kanza Wayne.

The show tells the story of strict customs and rituals of feudal times and their impact. The plot revolves around three people: Wali Bakht Khan, Mahjabeen and Neelum. It shows the effect of unwise traditions and old customs on this triangle relationship. Numm aired on 24 August 2013 worldwide by Geo Entertainment. Ahson Talish also acted in small scenes as the father of the male protagonist (Fawad Khan). The theme song of drama gained popularity among fans and viewer. It received mixed reviews from the critics.

== Cast ==
- Fawad Khan as Wali Bakht Khan, the youngest and strongest child of his family. After Khan returns from Oxford with a graduation degree, he is forced to marry with Neelum Akbar Khan. It is later revealed that he was first married to Mahjabeen who is now a servant in his household.
- Sania Saeed as Mahjabeen

Female protagonist and first wife of his cousin and Male lead, Wali Bakht, a hopeless and quiet girl who is seemingly satisfied with her life.

- Kanza Wayne as Neelum Akbar Khan

Second female protagonist and childhood fiance of Wali Bakht and later his wife, a panic and rebel character who is against her family traditions and customs.

- Usman Peerzada as Sikander Bakht:

A landlord/feudal head of a family and grandfather of male lead Wali bakht, who is a decision maker and proud family head of his breed's traditions.

- Ahson Talish as Jahangir Bakht:

Father of male lead Wali Bakht and son of Sikander Bakht, a flashback character who actually died and just be shown in postscript scenes and drawbacks.

- Farah Shah as Amtul Jahangir Bakht:

Mother of Wali bakht and mentally ill widowed of Jahangir Bakht, an educated woman who is also a victim of her family customs.

- Munazzah Arif as Rahat Akbar Khan:

Mother of female protagonist Neelum Akbar Khan, and widow of Akbar khan.

- Nasreen Qureshi as Ammu:

Mother of Akbar khan, thus grandmother of Neelum Akbar khan.

- Other cast includes, Shireen Zahid, Malik Tanveer, Sitara, Maryam Shah, Hashir, Jawad Butt, Raiz Balouch, Muhammad Agha and Ali Javed in less prominent and narrow supporting scenes.

== Production ==
=== Development ===
The Numm Drama serial was planned to go on-air in mid 2012 or early 2013, but due to cast selection and other technical issues, productions goes late. Ahson Talish son of Pakistani legendary actor late Agha Talish starts direction in late November 2012 and starts directing in early December with its assembled cast Fawad Khan, Sania Saeed and new up-comer and VJ, Kanza Wayne. Saeed took on the part because she believed her character was important and impactful, even though she wasn't the lead, and it was a story she could stand behind. The serial is produced by Agha Talish Productions and Q Link Productions. The serial is produced by Amjad Hashmi and co-produced by Ahson Talish's son Raza Talish and Tasneem Ahson. Ahson hired screenwriter Myra Sajid which starts her career as a playwright previously with Ahson's another project.

=== Dramatization ===
Ahson Talish began his direction in late December 2012 and finished it July 2013. Most of the drama was shot in Lahore and Abbottabad. Numm released its promos in late July until its airing.

== Episodes ==
Series	Episodes	Originally released			Direction	Screenplay	Lead Cast
Series	Episodes	First released	Last released	Network	Direction	Screenplay	Lead Cast
1	6	24 August 2013	28 September 2013	Geo TV	Ahson Talish	Myra Sajid	Fawad Khan; Sania Saeed; Kanza Wayne; Usman Peerzada

== Original soundtrack ==
Numm: Original Soundtrack (OST)

Soundtrack album by Faiza Mujahid
- Released: 12 August 2013
- Recorded: 2013
- Genres: Theme song Television soundtrack
- Length: 5:54
- Language: Urdu
- Label: Maann Production Studio
- Producers: Haider Hashmi; Imran Khalil

Faiza Mujahid chronology
Khuda Kay Liye (2012)	Numm: Original Soundtrack (OST) (2013)	Meri Zindagi (2013)

The Theme song of Numm is its original soundtrack, written by Ahson Talish the director of serial, and composed by Muhammad Agha. The music is separately produced by Haider Hashmi and co-produced by Imran Khalil. The song is sung by talented Faiza Mujahid who rose to fame by Bandya Ho from the 2012 Critically acclaimed Pakistani movie Khuda Kay Liye. The lyrics were penned down by Ahson beautifully and gain a huge acclaim.

=== Track listing ===
All lyrics are written by Ahson Talish; all music is composed by Muhammad Agha.

No.	Title	Artist(s)	Length
1.	"Mumkin hai Chashm-e-Numm"	Faiza Mujahid	5:54
