= Agha Mustafa Hassan =

Pakistani television and film actor

- Born: 17 March 1992 (age 34); Abbottabad, Khyber Paktunkhwa, Pakistan
- Education: Bachelor of Business Administration
- Occupation: Actor
- Years active: 2013–Present

Agha Mustafa Hassan is a Pakistani television and film actor.

He is known for his roles in the revenge drama such as Sang-e-Mar Mar (2016), the horror series Neeli Zinda Hai (2021), the mystery thriller Dour (2021) and the romance series Tere Bin (2022).

He was also seen in the web series Mrs. & Mr. Shameem opposite Saba Qamar and Nauman Ijaz.

== Career ==
Born to an army officer father, Agha Mustafa was initially interested in cricket but went into acting in 2013 while studying at NUST, Islamabad, when his sister pushed him to act in a play. He gained recognition with Anwar Maqsood's 2016 play Siachen. That same year, he made his television debut in Hum TV's Sang-e-Mar Mar.

== Filmography ==
=== Films ===
Year	Title	Role	Ref(s)
2016	Revenge of the Worthless	Sher Khan	
2022	Dum Mastam		

=== Television series ===
Year	Title	Role	Network	Ref(s)
2016	Sang-e-Mar Mar	Gohar Khan	Hum TV	
2016	Moray Saiyyan		ARY Digital	
2017	Pinjra	Waqar	A-Plus TV	
2018	De Ijazat	Faizan (Faizi)	Hum TV	
2018	Mohabbat.PK		Hum TV	
2018	Band Khirkiyan	Mohid	Hum TV	
2018	Visaal	Taimoor	ARY Digital	
2019	Kaisa Hai Naseeban	Affan	ARY Digital	
2019	Mehboob Aapke Qadmon Main	Sarim	Hum TV	
2020	Kahin Deep Jaley	Farhan	Geo Entertainment	
2021	Neeli Zinda Hai	Nawab	ARY Digital	
2021	Mere Apne		ARY Digital	
2021	Dour	Bilal	Geo Entertainment	
2021	Sila-e-Mohabbat	Shahmeer	Hum TV	
2022	Tere Bin	Malik Zubair	Geo Entertainment	
2023	Sar-e-Rah	Faraz	ARY Digital	
2023	Mein	Mohib	ARY Digital	
2023	Gumn	Sameer	Green Entertainment	
2023	Khumar	Rayyan	Geo Entertainment	
2024	Jaan Nisaar	Zawwar	Geo Entertainment	
2024	Sunn Mere Dil	Faraz	Geo Entertainment	

=== Telefilms ===
Year	Title	Role	Network	Ref(s)
2016	Ek Thi Marium	Qaiser (flight engineer)	Urdu1	

=== Web series ===
Year	Title	Role	Notes
2022	Mrs. & Mr. Shameem	Bilal	Opposite Saba Qamar and Nauman Ejaz
