= Abhi Tou Main Jawan Hoon =

Pakistani movie

- Original title: ابھی تو میں جوان ہوں
- Based on: Abhi Tou Main Jawan Hoon by S. Suleman
- Written by: Vasay Chaudhry
- Directed by: Nadeem Baig
- Starring: Mikaal Zulfiqar; Ayesha Khan; Atiqa Odho; Bushra Ansari; Saba Hameed; Usman Peerzada
- Country of origin: Pakistan
- Original language: Urdu

Production
- Producers: Humayun Saeed; Shehzad Naseeb; Tarang Houseful
- Running time: 123 minutes
- Production company: Six Sigma Plus

Original release
- Release: 2013

Abhi Tou Main Jawan Hoon is a 2013 Pakistani television film directed by Nadeem Baig and written by Vasay Chaudhry. The telefilm stars Mikaal Zulfiqar and Ayesha Khan in lead roles, with Bushra Ansari, Atiqa Odho, and Saba Hameed in prominent roles. The film is a remake of an old classic of the same name released in 1978, starring Shabnum, Shahid, and Sabiha Khanum.

== Plot ==
Faisal is a young and handsome man with a promising career in acting who is in love with Zehra (Ayesha Khan). However, in order to convince Zehra's father to give her daughter's hand in marriage, Faisal is forced to lie to him about his profession saying that he is general manager at a hotel; however, Zehra's father asks him to prove his employment there. Faisal's life becomes even more problematic when he finds out that the minimum age requirement for the post is 15. To keep up with his lie, Faisal disguises himself as an old man, however, a new problem is waiting for him around the corner.

== Cast ==
- Mikaal Zulfiqar as Faisal
- Ayesha Khan as Zara
- Bushra Ansari
- Saba Hameed
- Atiqa Odho
- Usman Peerzada
- Humayun Saeed (cameo)
