= Atiqa Odho =

Pakistani actress

- عتیقہ اوڈھو
- Atiqa Odho in 2025
- Born: 12 February 1968 (age 58); Karachi, Sindh, Pakistan
- Occupations: Actress and TV host
- Years active: 1989–present
- Spouses: Javed Akhund (m. 1989; div. 1999) Samar Ali Khan (m. 2012)

Atiqa Odho (Urdu: عتیقہ اوڈھو; born 12 February 1968) is a Pakistani television and film actress, television host, and the namesake of her own founded cosmetics brand Odho Cosmetics. She debuted in Anwar Maqsood's TV series Sitara aur Mehrunissa and later appeared in dramas like Dasht, Nijaat, Harjaee and later in Humsafar. She also starred in a string of films, including Jo Darr Gya Woh Marr Gya, Mummy and Mujhe Chand Chahiye.

== Early life and career ==
Born in 1968 into a Sindhi family, being the granddaughter of the Sardar of Jacobabad, she started her professional life as a make-up artist and hairstylist in 1989.

== Career ==
=== Acting ===
While working as a make-up artist for various advertising agencies in Karachi, she was discovered by television personality, Anwar Maqsood. She starred in his play Sitara Aur Mehrunissa in 1992. In 1995, she made her film debut in Jo Darr Gya Woh Marr Gya.

In 2008, Odho produced and acted in social problem film Chalo Phir Se Jee Lain, a telefilm based on breast cancer awareness.

In 2022, Atiqa Odho joins the Turkish drama Koyu Beyaz in which she will make her debut on the world stage.

=== Politics ===
She was close to the late Pervez Musharraf, even serving as secretary information of his party, the All Pakistan Muslim League.

=== Social work ===
Since 2016, she has also been engaged in philanthropic activities. She has been working for Shaukat Khanum Memorial Hospital, Fatmeed Foundation, and as a social worker in "Hamara Mulk, Hamaray Log". She is currently the CEO of Odho Cosmetics and Odho Productions. She is also the ambassador for a campaign on awareness of breast cancer in Pakistan.

In June 2021, Atiqa was elected as the chairperson of Actors Collective Trust that aims at the betterment of the artist community.

== Personal life ==
=== Marriages ===
Atiqa first married at the age of 15. She gave birth to her first daughter at the age of 16, and to a son at the age of 19. Her first marriage lasted six years.

Odho later married Javed Akhund at the age of 21 and had one daughter and a son. She gave birth to her son at the age of 29. A few years later, they were divorced.

In July 2012, she married Samar Ali Khan.

=== The liquor case controversy ===
In June 2011, Odho was detained and then released shortly after, by the Airport Security Force at the Benazir Bhutto International Airport for allegedly carrying two liquor bottles in her luggage. After a court trial for 9 years, she was finally acquitted by a Rawalpindi civil court in August 2020.

== Filmography ==
=== Films ===
| Year | Title | Role | Notes |
|---|---|---|---|
| 1995 | Jo Darr Gya Woh Marr Gya | | |
| 1997 | Mummy | | |
| 2000 | Mujhe Chand Chahiye | Maima-Javed' Sheikh aka Raziuddin's first wife | |
| 2016 | Lahore Se Aagey | Shama Rani | |
| 2016 | Dobara Phir Se | | |
| 2017 | Chain Aye Na | Ruba's mother | |
| 2018 | Na Band Na Baraati | Zoya's mother | |
| 2020 | Kahay Dil Jidhar | Shahana Farooqi | |
| 2025 | Neelofar | Begum Kashif | |

=== Television series ===
| Year | Title | Role | Notes |
|---|---|---|---|
| 1992 | Sitara Aur Mehrunissa | Sitara | |
| 1993 | Dasht | Shahtaaj | |
| 1993 | Nijaat | Sajida | |
| 1994 | Talaash | Sarah Ahmed | |
| 1994 | Angar Wadi | Dr. Hajra Hamza Shafee | |
| 2000 | Junoon | | |
| 2001 | Aan | | |
| 2002 | Kirchiyan | | |
| 2002 | Tum Hi To Ho | | |
| 2003 | Chahtain | | |
| 2003 | Umrao Jaan Ada | | |
| 2003 | Nasl | | |
| 2004 | Harjai | | |
| 2006 | Dhool | | |
| 2007 | Karishmay | | |
| 2008 | Atiqa O | | |
| 2008 | Kisay Awaz Doon | | |
| 2010 | Hum Tum | Shagufta | |
| 2011 | Saans | | |
| 2011 | Humsafar | Farida Hussain | |
| 2012 | Band Baje Ga | | |
| 2013 | Siskiyaan | | |
| 2013 | Ishq Samandar | | |
| 2013 | Aarzoo-Jeene Ki To Nahi | | |
| 2013 | Ghalti Se Mistake Ho Gai | | |
| 2015 | Dil Hi To Hai | | |
| 2015 | Nazo | | |
| 2016 | Mera Kya Qasoor Tha | | |
| 2016 | Iss Khamoshi Ka Matlab | Salma | |
| 2016 | Mushrik | | |
| 2016 | Besharam | Sara | |
| 2017 | Khan | Shabana | |
| 2017 | Laikin | | |
| 2017 | Piyari Bittu | Shakila | |
| 2018 | Khatakaar | | |
| 2018 | Ro Raha Hai Dil | | |
| 2019 | Hania | Saira | |
| 2020 | Pyar Ke Sadqay | Mansura | |
| 2021 | Pardes | Raheela | |
| 2022 | Angna | Zaiba | |
| 2022–23 | Kaisi Teri Khudgarzi | Mehwish | |
| 2022–23 | Meri Shehzadi | Shahana | |
| 2023 | Jurm | Shahana Mujib | |
| 2023 | Ehsaan Faramosh | Hamza's mother | |
| 2023 | Rang Badlay Zindagi | Samiya | |
| 2023 | Sukoon | Raza and Shanzeh's mother | |
| 2023 | Dhoka | Ahmed mother | |
| 2025 | Sher | Naima-Shahzaman's first wife | |
| 2025 | Neeli Kothi | Neelofar | |

=== Television long-plays/ telefilms ===
| Year | Title | Role | Network | Notes |
|---|---|---|---|---|
| 1991 | Aaks | | PTV | |
| 1992 | Talaash | | PTV | |
| 1995 | Zikar Hay Kayi Saal Ka | Neelofer | PTV | |
| 2001 | Tu Laak Chalay Re Gorey | | PTV | |
| 2002 | Aab Yaha Koi Nahi Aye Ga | | Indus Vision | |
| 2003 | Baykhabri | | Indus Vision | |
| 2004 | Marium | | Indus Vision | |
| 2007 | Tum Intezar Karna | | Aaj TV | |
| 2008 | Chalo Phir Se Jee Lain | | Ary Digital | |
| 2013 | Abhi Tou Main Jawan Hoon | Tasneem Tariq (TT) | PTV, Geo TV | |
| 2013 | Main Hu Pyar Tera | | Hum TV | |
| 2014 | Tum Na Miltay To | | Hum TV | |
| 2017 | Principal Nadira 19 Grade | Mrs. Nadira | Hum TV | |

=== Television shows ===
| Year | Title | Notes |
|---|---|---|
| 2006 | Karishma | |
| 2008–10 | Nestlé Nido Young Stars | |
| 2010 | Passion | |
| 2010 | Let's Makeup | |
| 2011 | In the spotlight with Atiqa Odho | |
| 2013 | Aap Ki Bat Atiqa Kay Sath | |

== Awards and recognition ==
| Year | Award | Category | Result | Film | Ref. |
|---|---|---|---|---|---|
| 2000 | Nigar Award | Best Supporting Actress | Won | Mujhe Chand Chahiye | |
| 2005 | Lux Style Awards | Best Television Actress | Nominated | Dhool | |
| 2021 | Pakistan International Screen Awards | Best Supporting Actress (Television) | Nominated | Pyar Ke Sadqay | |

== See also ==
- List of Pakistani actresses
