= Aseerzadi =

Pakistani drama television series

- Genre: Drama
- Written by: Mustafa Afridi
- Directed by: Mohammed Ehteshamuddin
- Starring: Sania Saeed; Ainy Jaffri; Salman Shahid; Noor Hassan Rizvi; Sakina Samo; Farah Shah
- Opening theme: "Reet Riwaj Ke Zewar Hain Ye" by Fariha Pervez & Sherry Raza
- Country of origin: Pakistan
- Original language: Urdu
- No. of seasons: 1
- No. of episodes: 24

Production
- Producer: Momina Duraid

Original release
- Network: Hum TV
- Release: 17 August 2013 – 25 January 2014

Aseer Zadi (Urdu: اسیر زادی, lit. 'Daughter of a Prisoner') is a Pakistani television drama series written by Mustafa Afridi and directed by Mohammed Ehteshamuddin. It was produced by Momina Duraid and aired on Hum TV from 17 August 2013 to 25 January 2014. The series features an ensemble cast, including Sania Saeed, Ainy Jaffri, Sakina Samo, Salman Shahid, Farah Shah, and Noor Hassan Rizvi. The story follows a girl who challenges the traditional norms and values of the family she has recently married into.

The show was selected to run in India on Zindagi under the title Pyar Ka Haq. It marked the last on-screen appearance of veteran actor Farooq Zameer following his death in February 2017. In January 2024, the series was celebrated in a week-long event in Paris, Texas, becoming the first Pakistani series to receive official recognition in the US at a governmental level.

== Plot ==
"Aseer Zadi" is a story about a family that prides itself on its traditions, and all the men of the family have married three time since their first and second wives were not capable of bearing them children. The family only thinks that the third wife can give birth to a child, and even if the first or second wife gives birth to a child, the child is killed. The head of the family, Great Peer, marries Amna, who becomes pregnant, but her child is killed. He marries Naseem who is incapable, and finally he marries Bari Sarkar, who gives birth to a boy named Shahaab, while Amna and Naseem are treated as living deadbodies wearing only a white suit. Many years pass and Shahaab has grown up.

The same is going to happen with him, but he hates this principle. His third wife will be Fatima, daughter of Bari Sarkar's brother. Bari Sarkar loves her more than Shahaab, but Shahaab hates her. Fatima always teases Amna and Naseem. Shahaab is married to Yasmeen, but as she could not bear a child, he is being married to Maira. Maira at first rejects because of the family principle, which makes Amna and Naseem happy. Although Maira, and Yasmeen are wives of the same man, they are good friends. Shahaab starts liking Maira whereas Maira's cousin Bilal calls her at her in-laws house. Fatima manipulates the situation in such a way that Shahaab starts doubting Maira. Bari Sarkar abuses Maira, but Peer Jalal supports her. Seeing both of them alone, Amna suspects an affair between them, which creates misunderstandings between Peer Jalal and Bari Sarkar, but all that is resolved as Amna was thinking wrong. Maira and Shahaab have a nice relationship. They both go on a honeymoon.

Now Shahaab has to marry Fatima. He returns, but Maira faints, so he goes back and doesn't come till 1 am. On the other hand, the doctor says to Shahaab that Maira is pregnant. When he tells the truth to Bari Sarkar, she throws Maira in a room. Bari Sarkar says that she will take her to a doctor. But Amna warns Maira by saying what had happened with her. Amna starts blackmailing Peer Jalal while Naseem abuses Peer Jalal and Bari Sarkar by saying the incident that happened with Amna. She says what happened with me should not happen to Maira. He agrees. On the other hand, Shahaab calls Dr. Mehrunnisa in their home. While Naseem says to Amna that she has taken advantage of this situation, but Amna says that she has done right. Bari Sarkar goes to her brother's house for forgiveness, but to no avail, while Fatima supports Bari Sarkar. Upon hearing the truth, Bari Sarkar is shocked. Fatima starts crying while Maira ridicules Fatima. Yasmeen comes and threatens Maira by saying that she is just pregnant and there is no full guarantee that she will give birth to this child. Maira is shocked by Yasmeen's behaviour. Now Amna, Naseem, and Yasmeen are no more living dead bodies who wear white suits as widows but wearing expensive, colourful suits. Yasmeen lures towards Shahaab, which makes Maira suspicious. Her mother tells her to keep some distance from Yasmeen. At first she ignores, but later believes. While coming from her mother's home to her in-laws house, she forgets the cloth, which is compulsory for all the girls of the house, and so Bari Sarkar is furious at her. Maira taunts her by saying that her husband has no problem, so what's her problem. Shahaab is angry with Maira. Bari Sarkar, in anger, leaves the house and goes to her brother Sikandar's house. Fatima supports Bari Sarkar, which makes Sikandar angry. Shahaab comes to take Bari Sarkar, but Fatima refuses by saying that if anyone from the mansion comes to pick Bari Sarkar, he/she should be thrown out of the house. Peer Jalal creates problems between Maira and Shahaab by saying that the child in Maira's womb does not belong to Shahaab. Maira goes to her house, where Bilal tells Maira to go to her in-laws house, which makes Maira angry. He calls her twice, and then again her phone rings; she thinks it's Bilal and she abuses Bilal, but it is of Shahaab. Maira becomes tensed.

Now Naseem starts behaving as the Bari Sarkar of the house. Fatima takes care of Bari Sarkar and goes to bring breakfast. Bari Sarkar sees her laptop as an audio clip is opened, and she presses the Play Button. She hears that Fatima has insulted Shahaab and is happy. She feels dejected, as she had loved her more than anyone, and she betrayed her by saying that no one has arrived to pick her up. She goes to her house, but now she is no more arrogant and a vamp but a good woman. She learns of Peer Jalal's lies and tells Shahaab to pick Maira. While Yasmeen wants a child from Shahaab, Amna requests Naseem to forgive Peer Jalal, and finally she forgives him. Maira meanwhile is angry with Shahaab, so Bari Sarkar consoles her.

On the other hand, Fatima goes mentally ill. So Sikandar vows to take revenge from Maira. Yasmeen's jealousy is increased so much that she asks for divorce from Shahaab, but he doesn't give her one. Maira tells Shahaab to spend some time with Yasmeen, as she is also his wife. Maira is going to the doctor, so Bari Sarkar also joins her. Peer Jalal calls Sikander and says that this is the right time as Maira is going out. Bari Sarkar says to Maira that both boys and girls are the same. Meanwhile, Sikandar shoots the car in which Maira is going and sees a bloodied hand. He is very happy. Shahaab gets a call, and he and Yasmeen go to the hospital where it is revealed that Bari Sarkar, not Maira, was fatally struck by the bullet. Peer Jalal commits suicide.

Many years have passed, and Maira has three kids-two sons and one daughter. Yasmeen, on the other hand, is unhappy, so Maira gives her son to Yasmeen forever. Yasmeen is happy. When Shahaab asks Maira that what should be our daughter's name, she replies that it will be Zeenat Shahabuddin as this was Bari Sarkar's original name. Maira and Shahaab live happily forever.

== Cast ==
- Sania Saeed as Bari Sarkar/Zeenat Begum, Peer's third wife, Shahaab's mother and Fatima's paternal aunt
- Ainy Jaffri as Maira, Shahaab's second wife
- Farooq Zameer as Maira's father
- Noor Hassan Rizvi as Shahaab, Maira's husband and Bari Sarkar's son
- Salman Shahid as Peer Jalal
- Sakina Samo as Amna, Peer's first wife
- Farah Shah as Naseem, Peer's second wife
- Eshita Mehboob as Yasmeen, Shahaab's first wife
- Saniya Shamshad as Fatima, Bari Sarkar's niece. Likes Shahaab and ridicules Amna and Naseem
- Yasir Shoro as Bilal, Maira's paternal cousin and love interest
- Saife Hassan as Bari Sarkar's brother and Fatima's father
- Mehak Ali as Fatima's mother
- Humaira Zaheer as Firdous, Blial's mother and Maira's paternal aunt
- Ghazala Javaid as Maira's mother

== Reception ==
A reviewer from the TV Kahani praised the characterisation, cinematography, dialogues, script, and performances of the actors particularly Salman Shahid, Ainy Jaffri and Sakina Samo but critiqued the editing, pace and lengthy scenes.

== Awards ==
Year	Award	Category & Nominee/recipient	Result	Ref.
2014	Hum Awards	Best Drama Serial to Momina Duraid	Nominated	
2014	Hum Awards	Best Director to Mohammed Ehteshamuddin	Nominated	
2014	Hum Awards	Best Supporting Actress to Saniya Shamshad	Nominated	
2014	Hum Awards	Best Writer Drama Serial to Mustafa Afridi	Nominated	
2014	Hum Awards	Best Original Soundtrack to Fariha Pervez and Sherry Raza	Nominated	
2014	Hum Awards	Best Drama Serial Viewers Choice to Momina Duraid	Nominated	
2014	Hum Awards	Best Supporting Actor to Noor Hassan Rizvi	Nominated	
2014	Hum Awards	Best Actress Jury to Sania Saeed	Won	
2014	Hum Awards	Best Actress Viewers Choice to Sania Saeed	Nominated	
2014	Hum Awards	Best Supporting Actress to Sakina Samo	Nominated	
2014	Hum Awards	Most Impactful Character to Sania Saeed	Nominated	
2014	Hum Awards	Most Impactful Character to Sakina Samo	Won	
2014	Hum Awards	Best Supporting Actor to Salman Shahid	Won	
