= Dour (2021 serial) =

2021 Pakistani mystery and thriller drama

- Title screen
- Genre: Romance; Mystery; Drama
- Written by: Saji Gul
- Directed by: Mazhar Moin
- Starring: Sania Saeed; Azfar Rehman; Hina Altaf; Ali Abbas; Iffat Rahim
- Country of origin: Pakistan
- Original language: Urdu
- No. of seasons: 1
- No. of episodes: 41

Production
- Producers: Abdullah Kadwani; Asad Qureshi
- Running time: 38 minutes approx.
- Production company: 7th Sky Entertainment

Original release
- Network: Geo Entertainment
- Release: 29 June – 23 November 2021

Dour (Urdu: ڈور transl. Thread) is a 2021 Pakistani mystery and thriller drama television series produced by Abdullah Kadwani and Asad Qureshi under the banner of 7th Sky Entertainment. It is directed by Mazhar Moin and written by Saji Gul. It stars Sania Saeed, Azfar Rehman, Hina Altaf, Ali Abbas and Iffat Rahim in lead roles. The drama serial broadcasts on Geo Entertainment after it premiered on 29 June 2021. It is available to watch digitally on YouTube.

== Plot ==
Mrs. Ehtishaam has provided her sons with every luxury in the world. One of her sons, Abaan, is unable to live life to the fullest as he happens to be handicapped. However, her sons are unaware of a tragic secret she has been withholding from them, especially from Romaan who is always at his best behavior and is an asset to the family business. After years of causing distress to his family, Abaan finds a new target after Romaan introduces his family to the love of his life, Asma.

== Cast ==
- Azfar Rehman as Abaan
- Hina Aagha as Asma
- Ali Abbas as Romaan
- Sania Saeed as Mrs. Ehtisham (Abaan & Romaan's mother)
- Adla Khan as Yasmeen
- Iffat Rahim as Kulsoom
- Haris Waheed as Adil
- Saleem Mairaj as Shokat
- Nayyar Ejaz as Sabir (Asma & Yasmeen's father) (Dead)
- Emaan Ahmed as Guriya
- Hania Ahmed as Haniya
- Mizna Waqas as Geeti
- Nataliya as Poro Chisti
- Hameedullah Khan as Hameed
- Musazam Shah as Rehmat Bibi
- Salman Arif as Salman
- Meesam Naqvi as Hashim
- Fazila Qazi as Ruqaiyya (guest appearance)
- Javed as Yasir (guest appearance)
- Agha Mustafa Hassan as Bilal
