= Sania Saeed =

Pakistani actress (born 1972)

- ثانیہ سعید
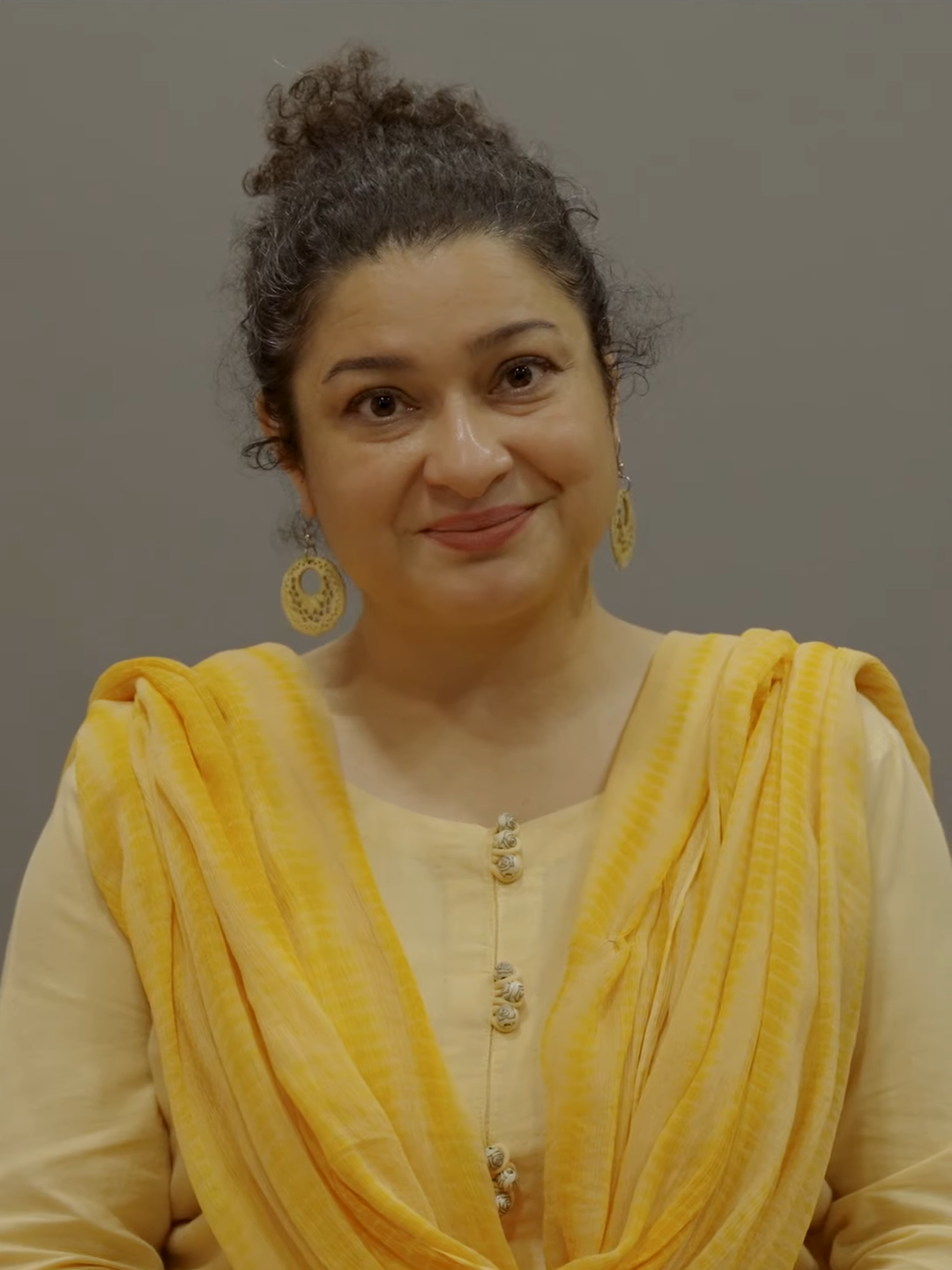
- Saeed in 2024
- Born: 28 August 1972 (age 54); Karachi, Pakistan
- Education: University of Karachi
- Occupations: Actress; Anchor
- Years active: 1989–present
- Spouse: Shahid Shafaat (m. 1998; div. 2025)

Sania Saeed (Urdu: ثانِیہ سعِید) is a Pakistani actress and television host who works mainly in television and theatre. Saeed is the recipient of numerous accolades including one PTV Award, four Hum Awards and four Lux Style Awards.

She first appeared on television in a street theatre play, televised for 8 March, for the program Aadhi Duniya in 1989. The play was Aurat. She was the first announcer for Network Television Marketing, Karachi center. She then appeared in Haseena Moin's serial Aahat, directed by Sahira Kazmi, followed by Anwar Maqsood's Sitara Aur Mehrunissa directed by Zark in 1991 and 1992 respectively, which shot Sania to stardom in the Pakistani television Industry. Sania has been working in theatre and television for over three decades.

== Early life and education ==
Saeed was born on 28 August 1972 in Karachi, Pakistan. Her father Mansoor Saeed was a playwriter and a theater practitioner being an active member of the theater group Dastak which was formed in 1982.

Saeed started her career at a young age by performing in street theatre and as a voice over artist for other productions. She could understand and speak Punjabi as well.

== Other work ==
Saeed works for social causes with various nonprofit organisations including Kashf Foundation, The Citizens Foundation, Indus Hospital and Sindh Institute of Urology & Transplantation.

== Career ==
=== Early work and breakthrough ===
Saeed had her first role in 1989 in the political-drama Tapish, written by Noorul Huda Shah. She first rose to prominence in 1991 with her debut lead role in Haseena Moin's written Aahat, based on the theme of family planning. Saeed portrayed the mother of sevens in it when she herself was of seventeen years.

=== Established actress ===
In 1992, her role of a housewife coping with the marital problems in Anwar Maqsood's written family-drama Sitara Aur Mehrunissa further cemented her position as a leading star of the television. She termed the role as one of her favourites in her career.

In 2000, she paired opposite Humayun Saeed in drama Aur Zindagi Badalti Hai as a Pakistani expat who looks for her lost sister in Spain. In 2003, she portrayed Sarah, a headstrong lawyer in Haseena Moin's written social-drama Shayad Ke Bahar Aaye. Her performance in the series was praised by critics. In 2005, Saeed played Sabah in romance Thodi Si Mohabbat. For her performance in the series, she received a nomination of Best TV Actress - Satellite at the 3rd Lux Style Awards; but couldn't win due to the network unavailability in rural areas, leading the awards management to come up with separate categories for Satellite and Terrestrial networks in the following year. In 2009, she depicted an eponymous young to older dancer in the romance-drama Jhumka Jaan. Although personally dissatisfied with her performance due to her inexpertise to dance, Saeed won Best Television Actress trophy for the performance at the 8th Lux Style Awards. The same year, she appeared in the romance-drama Khamoshiyaan opposite Nauman Ijaz and Faisal Rehman. Saeed portrayed a doting housewife whose life changes altogether when her daughter meets with a road accident.

Saeed began the year 2010 with her portrayal of a dutiful investigation officer in the murder-mystery Qatil, an adaptation of Agatha Christie's bestseller And Then There Were None. Her next appearance in that year was in the thriller-drama The Ghost, where she portrayed Maya Kapoor, a headstrong Indian from 1940s who travels to Scotland in search of her fiance. The series was an adaptation of Danielle Steel's novel of the same name, and Saeed portrayed the split version of the original character as in the novel. She then appeared as a seductress widow in the drama Kalmoohi, an adaptation of Rabidranath Tagore's Chokher Bali. In 2011, she played a newlywed bride coping with her marital life problems in the family-drama Hawa, Rait aur Aangan opposite Adnan Siddiqui, winning her, her fourth Best Actress tophy at the 10th Lux Style Awards. The same year, she played up to sixteen characters alongside Nauman Ijaz in theatrical-drama Aao Kahani Buntay Hain. Saeed then played the calm and resilient Sabeen opposite Humayun Saeed in family-drama Lamha Lamha Zindagi. She reworked her character in the series, turning the potentially weak character due the script's limitations into a powerful one. In 2012, she played a reckless stepmother in drama Zard Mausam, based on Rahat Jabeen's novel of the same title. In 2013, she paired with Adnan Siddiqui in her second collaboration in the romance Darmiyaan as a doting housewife caught in a horrible conflict. It was followed by a role opposite Fawad Khan in social-issue drama Numm, where she portrayed a quiet and hopeless victim of the feudalism. In 2014, Saeed played an impulsive housewife coping with the turbulent marital life in the drama Oos.

=== Critical acclaim and further career ===
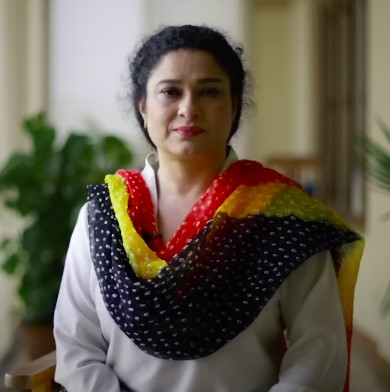
Saeed in 2020

Saeed made her cinematic debut with the biographical-drama Manto, based on the Indian-Subcontinent's eminent writer Saadat Hassan Manto. Saeed played Manto's wife Safiya Manto in the film, and found the role challenging due to the limited information available about her. In a review of the film, Khusro Mumtaz of The News International found her "unassumingly effective as the writer’s long-suffering wife". For her performance, Saeed received a nomination of Best Film Actress at the 15th Lux Style Awards.

In 2016, she played an oracle alongside an ensemble cast in Sarmad Khoosat's directed fantasy-drama Mor Mahal. She termed the role as the weirdest thing of her career she has ever done. The same year, she portrayed an oppressed Pashtun housewife from the tribal areas in the revenge-drama Sang-e-Mar Mar. The series earned her critical praise.

Her first performance of 2017 was in the Johns Hopkins's co-produced social-issue drama Sammi. Saeed's performance of a stern beautician earned her Hum Award for Most Impactful Character at the 6th Hum Awards. She then portrayed a doting aunt to her niece, a patient of Alzheimer's disease in the psychological-drama Piyari Bittu. The series was her reunion with Atiqa Odho since Sitara Aur Mehrunnisa. Saeed then respired her role of Safiya Manto in Manto, the television remake of her eponymous film.

In 2018, she starred as a caring mother seeking justice for her sexually abused and murdered daughter in the crime-drama Meri Guriya. Due to the emotional troll of the role in the series, Saeed had to take a break from acting of one and half year. Her next role was a guest appearance of a supportive aunt of the orphan protagonist in Chakkar, directed by Kanwal Khoosat.

In 2020, she appeared in a supporting role in the romance Mehar Posh, depicting Nusrat, the loving and resilient mother of the protagonist. Saeed worked with the director Mazhar Moin to infuse the character with elements of fun and familial love, adding nuance to the role that was initially conceived differently. Her next appearance in that year was a brief role in Asim Abbasi's-helmed web-series Churails, as a wife who makes Nihari of her infidel husband.

In 2022, saeed played a strong-willed, tolerant wife welcoming her husband's ex-beloved in the romance Raqeeb Se. The series was written by Bee Gul, and Saeed was paired opposite Nauman Ijaz. She next appeared as a controlling and cunning matriarch in Saji Gul's written mystery-thriller Dour.

In 2022, she appeared in the revenge-drama Sang-e-Mah, second series of the trilogy preceded by Sang-e-Mar Mar. Saeed depicted a strong willed Pashtun widow in the series. While reviewing the series, Maham Sajid of The Friday Times found her "in a truly remarkable avatar". Saeed then appeared in her second film, Joyland as Fayyaz, a tradition elderly Lahori woman caught between traditions and her personal desires. She next appeared in her third feature Kamli as a blind pious lady who doesn't let her sister-in-law remarry after her brother's disappearance for the past eight years.

Saeed begun 2023 with the portrayal of patriarch of a family who faces some paranormal experiences in the horror-drama Bandish. She then appeared in the Yasra Rizvi-directed mystery-drama Shanaas, as the loving adoptive mother of the protagonist.

== Filmography ==
=== Films ===
Year	Title	Role	Notes	Ref(s)
2015	Manto	Safiya Manto		
2019	Baaji	Neha's lawyer	Cameo	
2022	Joyland	Fayyaz		
2022	Kamli	Sakina		

== Television ==
Year	Title	Role	Network	Notes	Ref(s)
1989	Tapish	Beena	PTV		
1991	Aahat	Rabya	PTV		
1992	Sitara Aur Mehrunissa	Mehrunissa	NTM		
1994	Talaash	Tabassum	PTV	Telefilm	
1994	Sherry And Jozy	Hadia	PTV	Telefilm	
1996	Ab Tum Ja Saktey Ho	Raheela	PTV	Telefilm	
1997	Putli Ghar	Saima	PTV	Telefilm	
1997	Farar	Tania	PTV	Telefilm	
2000	Us Paar	Zeenat	PTV		
2000	Zaib-un-Nisa	Saba	PTV		
2000	Chhoti Chhoti Batain		PTV	Sitcom	
2000	Aur Zindagi Badalti Hai	Isra	PTV		
2001	Kahaniyan	different roles.	PTV	Anthology series	
2003	Shayad Ke Bahar Aaye	Sara	PTV		
2004	Thori Si Mohabbat		Geo Entertainment		
2007	Jaal		Geo Entertainment		
2007	Jhumka Jaan	Jhumka Jaan	Hum TV		
2008	Khamoshian	Rubab	Hum TV		
2010	Bebaak		Hum TV		
2010	The Ghost	Maya Kapoor	Hum TV		
2010	Roshan		PTV		
2010	Kalmoohi	Noor Bano	PTV		
2010	Zinnia	lawyer	PTV		
2010	Hawa Rait Aur Angan	Arfa	PTV		
2011	Aao Kahani Buntay Hain	different roles.	PTV		
2011	Lamha Lamha Zindagi	Sabeen	ARY Digital		
2011	Hum Pe Jo Guzarti Hai		Express Entertainment		
2012	Zard Mausam	Mehr-un-Nisa	Hum TV		
2013	Darmiyaan	Nida	ARY Digital		
2013	Zindagi Udaas Hai Tu	Amber	Geo Entertainment	Episode: Kya Karun Ammi	
2013	Aseerzadi	Bari Sarkar / Zeenat Begum	Hum TV		
2013	Numm	Mah Jabeen	Geo Entertainment		
2013	Kitni Girhain Baqi Hain	Zohra, Salma	Hum TV	Episodes: Jharan, Zindagi Hai, Behne Do	
2013	Shareek-e-Hayat	Ruqaiyya	Hum TV	Episode: Har Qadam Tumhare Saath	
2014	Oas	Maham	PTV Home		
2015	Aitraz		ARY Digital		
2016	Mor Mahal	Akhtari	Geo Entertainment		
2016	Sang-e-Mar Mar	Shameem	Hum TV		
2017	Sammi	Chandi	Hum TV		
2017	Bubu Ki Beti		A-Plus Entertainment		
2017	Piyari Bittu	Shakra	Express Entertainment		
2017	Manto	Safiya Manto	Geo Entertainment		
2018	Meri Guriya	Shehnaz	ARY Digital		
2018	Chakkar	Nuzhat/ Nuzhi Aapa	BOL Entertainment		
2019	Gul-e-Rana Ki Bhawajain	Sanjeeda Begum	ARY Digital		
2020	Mehar Posh	Nusrat	Geo Entertainment		
2020	Mera Maan Rakhna	Momina	TV One		
2020	Be Adab	Rohail's mother	Hum TV		
2021	Raqeeb Se	Hajra	Hum TV		
2021	Dour	Mrs. Ehtisham	Geo Entertainment		
2022	Sang-e-Mah	Zarghuna	Hum TV		
2023	Bandish 2	Humera	ARY Digital		
2023	Shanaas	Mahrukh	Green Entertainment		
2023	Kitni Girhain Baaki Hain	Nazia	Hum TV	Episode: Paiwand	
2024	Dil Manay Na	Dr. Shabana	Green Entertainment		
2025	Ae Dil		ARY Digital		
2026	Bombay Trailors	Tabbasum	Hum TV		
2026	Aap Ki Izzat	Tabish's Mother	Hum TV		
2026	Dar-e-Nijaat	Khushbakht (Bella)	ARY Digital		

=== Talk shows ===
Year	Title	Network	Ref.
2000	Ariel Maa (season I)	PTV	

=== Telefilms ===
Year	Title	Role	Network	Notes	Ref(s)
1994	Talaash	Tabassum	PTV		
1996	Ab Tum Ja Saktey Ho	Raheela	PTV		
1997	Putli Ghar	Saima	PTV		
1997	Farar	Tania	PTV		
2025	Badru Chacha Ka Makan	Kaneez Begum	ARY Digital		

=== Theater ===
Year	Title	Notes	Ref(s)
2008	Prem Kahani		
2009	Main Adakara Banu Gi		
2015	Lorilei	Monodrama	Monodrama
2018	Likhay Jo Khat Tujhay		
2021	Yaar Julahay		

=== Web series ===
Year	Title	Role	Notes	Ref(s)
2020	Churails	Shehnaz Khalid	Released on ZEE5	
2023	The Pink Shirt	Neelam	Released on ZEE5	

== Awards and nominations ==
Year	Award	Category	Work	Result	Ref(s)
1999	PTV Awards	Best Acteess	Aik Thi Mehroo	Won	
2001	1st Lux Style Awards	Best TV Actress	–	Nominated	
2003	2nd Lux Style Awards	Best TV Actress	Shayad Kay Bahar Aaye	Won	
2004	3rd Lux Style Awards	Best TV Actress	Thori Si Mohabbat	Nominated	
2009	8th Lux Style Awards	Best TV Actress - Satellite	Jhumka Jaan	Won	
2010	9th Lux Style Awards	Best TV Actress - Satellite	The Ghost	Won	
2011	PTV Awards	Best Actress Outsource	Roshan	Won	
2011	10th Lux Style Awards	Best TV Actress - Terrestrial	Hawa Rait Aur Aangan	Won	
2012	11th Lux Style Awards	Best TV Actress - Terrestrial	Aao Kahani Buntay Hain	Nominated	
2013	1st Hum Awards	Best Actress	Zard Mausam	Nominated	
2014	2nd Hum Awards	Best Actress - Jury	Aseerzadi	Won	
2014	2nd Hum Awards	Best Actress - Popular	Aseerzadi	Nominated	
2014	2nd Hum Awards	Most Impactful Character	Aseerzadi	Nominated	
2016	2nd ARY Film Awards	Best Actor Female (Jury)	Manto	Won	
2016	15th Lux Style Awards	Best Film Actress	Manto	Nominated	
2017	5th Hum Awards	Best Supporting Actress	Sang-e-Mar Mar	Won	
2018	6th Hum Awards	Most Impactful Character	Sammi	Won	
2022	8th Hum Awards	Most Impactful Character	Raqeeb Se	Won	
2024	9th Hum Awards	Most Impactful Character	Sang-e-Mah	Won	
2024	5th Hum Women Leaders Awards	Kashmir Golden Plate of Excellence		Won	
