= Mustafa Afridi =

Screenwriter and actor from Pakistan

- Born: Dera Ismail Khan, Khyber Pakhtunkhwa, Pakistan
- Education: National Academy of Performing Arts
- Occupations: Screenwriter; Actor
- Writing career
- Notable works: Aseerzadi (2013–2014); Sang-e-Mar Mar (2016–2017); Aangan (2018–2019); Ehd-e-Wafa (2019–2020)

Mustafa Afridi (Urdu: مصطفیٰ آفریدی) is a screenwriter and occasional actor from Pakistan, known for his television plays in Urdu television industry such as Aseerzadi (2013–2014), Sang-e-Mar Mar (2016–2017) and Ehd-e-Wafa (2019–2020). He is the recipient of a Hum Award and two Lux Style Awards for Best Television Writer.

== Early life and education ==
Afridi joined the industry as writer after getting education from National Academy of Performing Arts.

== Career ==
His first project as a writer was an episode named Mukti in PTV's Partition Stories. He aspired to become an actor but his teachers found him more suited for writing.

He also played the role of Azhar in Hum TV's pre-partition period play Aangan, for which he wrote the screenplay as well.

== Notable work ==
Key
†	Denotes Series that have not yet been released

Year	Title	Network	Actor	Notes	Ref.
2007	Partition Stories	PTV Home		Episode "Mukti"	
2009	Dil-e-Nadan	GEO Entertainment			
2010	Chaand Pe Dastak	Hum TV		Ramadan special	
2011	Khandaan-e-Shuglia	ARY Digital			
2011	Phir Chand Pe Dastak	Hum TV		Ramadan special	
2013	Aseerzadi	Hum TV			
2014	Firaaq	Hum TV			
2016	Sang-e-Mar Mar	Hum TV			
2017	Yeh Raha Dil	Hum TV		Based on the Turkish series İlişki Durumu: Karışık	
2017	Mohabbat.PK	Hum TV		Miniseries	
2018	Laila			Short film	
2018	Aangan	Hum TV	Yes	Based on Khadija Mastoor's novel Aangan (1962); also played the recurring role of Azhar	
2019	Superstar			Feature film, wrote dialogues only	
2019	Ehd-e-Wafa	Hum TV			
2022	Sang-e-Mah	Hum TV		Inspired by William Shakespeare's Hamlet (1599-1601)	
2024	Zard Patton Ka Bunn	Hum TV			
2024	Faraar	Green TV			
2024	Tan Man Neel o Neel	Hum TV	Yes	Miniseries; also played the role of Kamal Murad, a cameo appearance in the last episode (11)	
2026	Khan Tumhara			Screenwriter	
TBA	Firon †				

== Awards and achievements ==
Year	Ceremony	Category	Project	Result	Ref.
2012	Hum Awards	Best Television Writer	Aseerzadi	Nominated	
2017	Hum Awards	Best Television Writer	Sang-e-Mar Mar	Won	
2018	Lux Style Awards	Best Television Writer	Sang-e-Mar Mar	Won	
2020	Pakistan International Screen Awards	Best Television Writer	Ehd-e-Wafa	Nominated	
2020	Lux Style Awards	Best Television Writer	Ehd-e-Wafa	Nominated	
2023	Lux Style Awards	Best Television Writer	Sang-e-Mah	Won	
