= Aur Zindagi Badalti Hai =

Pakistani television series

- Title screen
- Original title: اور زندگی بدلتی ہے
- Written by: Nasreen Rahman
- Directed by: Mehreen Jabbar
- Starring: Sania Saeed; Nadia Jamil; Humayun Saeed; Faisal Rehman
- Theme music composer: Ustaaz
- Country of origin: Pakistan
- Original language: Urdu
- No. of episodes: 13

Production
- Producer: Sultana Siddiqui
- Cinematography: Anu Malik
- Production company: Moomal Entertainment

Original release
- Network: Pakistan Television Corporation
- Release: 2000 – 2000

Aur Zindagi Badalti Hai (Urdu: اور زندگی بدلتی ہے, lit. 'And the Life Changes') is a Pakistani television series directed by Mehreen Jabbar and produced by Sultana Siddiqui. It is based on a short story by Nadia Jamil and was written by Nasreen Rahman. It stars Sania Saeed, Nadia Jamil, Humayun Saeed, and Faisal Rehman. The 13-episodes series originally broadcast on Pakistan Television Corporation in 2000.

At the 1st Lux Style Awards, it received the Best TV Play nomination.

== Plot ==
Isra lives with her ailing father, the only member in her house. Dr. Omair, who regularly checks her father, falls for her and they both get married. Soon after their marriage, her father dies due to deteriorated health. After her father's death, she discovers that she has a sister who is currently living in Spain. She goes there in search of her where she meets her sister, Anna. While there, Isra also comes across Lali (a friend of Anna's mother), Zain (Lali's brother), and Shehryar who loves Anna. Things take a complicated turn when Isra falls for Zain.

== Cast ==
- Sania Saeed as Isra
- Nadia Jamil as Anna
- Humayun Saeed as Zain
- Faisal Rehman as Shehryar
- Sakina Samo as Lali
- Shabbir Jan as Bash
- Saife Hassan as Omair
- Sultana Zafar as Bua
- Masood Zia as Siddiqui
- Mehroze Karim as Ehtisham

== Production ==
Saeed described the series as a "psychological and emotional play". Besides Pakistan, the series was shot in Spain also.

== Awards and nominations ==
Year	Awards	Category	Recipient(s)/ nominee(s)	Result	Ref.
2002	Lux Style Awards	Best TV Play	Aur Zindagi Badalti Hai	Nominated	
