= Talaash (Pakistani TV series) =

- Title screen
- Written by: Anwar Maqsood
- Directed by: Atiqa Odho
- Starring: Salman Ahmad; Atiqa Odho; Ali Azmat; Brian O'Connell; Sania Saeed
- Country of origin: Pakistan
- Original language: Urdu

Production
- Executive producers: Salman Ahmad; Atiqa Odho
- Running time: Approx. 110 minutes

Original release
- Network: PTV
- Release: 1994

Talaash (Urdu: تلاش, lit. 'The Search') is a 1994 Pakistan television film based on and featuring Junoon, a popular Pakistani sufi rock music group. It was written by Anwar Maqsood and directed by Atiqa Odho.

== Cast ==
- Salman Ahmad as Salman
- Atiqa Odho as Sara Ahmad
- Ali Azmat as Ali
- Sania Saeed as Tanveer Tabassum "TT"
- Brian O'Connell as Brian
- Ayesha O'Coneell as Aliya
- Badar Khalil as Salman's mother
- Ali Akhtar Zaidi as Salman's father

=== Guest appearances ===
- Shafi Muhammad Shah as Ahmad
- Nauman Ijaz as Saleem

== Reception ==
A reviewer from The Herald commended the performances of all the actors especially Sania Saeed, but considered Noman Ejaz's performance as unimpressive.
