= Sitara Aur Mehrunissa =

- Title screen
- Genre: Romance; Drama; Tragedy
- Written by: Anwar Maqsood
- Directed by: Zarak
- Starring: Atiqa Odho; Sania Saeed; Sajid Hassan; Azra Sherwani; Anwar Maqsood; Latif Kapadia; Akbar Subhani
- Country of origin: Pakistan
- Original language: Urdu
- No. of episodes: 6

Production
- Producer: Zaheer Khan
- Production location: Pakistan
- Running time: 50 min. (excluding commercials)

Original release
- Network: NTM
- Release: 1992

Sitara Aur Mehrunissa (Urdu: ستارہ اور مہر النساء, lit. 'Sitara and Mehrunissa') is a Pakistani Urdu television series written by Anwar Maqsood. It starred Sania Saeed as Mehrunissa and Atiqa Odho as Sitara in her debut performance. Other members of the cast included Anwar Maqsood, Azra Sherwani and Sajid Hassan. Sitara Aur Mehrunissa was very popular and was screened during prime time television. It telecast in 1992 on NTM

== Synopsis ==
The story was about two cousins Sitara and Mehrunnisa and what problems they have to face after their marriages. Sitara has to go through a mental turmoil whereas Mehrunnisa has to suffer at the hands of her abusive and greedy husband.

== Cast ==
- Atiqa Odho as Sitara
- Sania Saeed as Mehrunissa
- Sajid Hassan as Ramis Hussain
- Azra Sherwani as Roshan Ara Begum
- Anwar Maqsood as Sitara's father
- Latif Kapadia as Shakil uddin
- Akbar Subhani as Irfan

== Production ==
Atiqa Odho stated that when Anwer Maqsood offered her the part in the series, she felt a deep connection to the series viewing it as a life-changing opportunity to bring meaningful characters to life on screen.

== See also ==
- Network Television Marketing (NTM TV Channel)
