= Aao Kahani Buntay Hain =

2011 Pakistani TV series

- Title screen
- Original title: آؤ کہانی بنتے ہیں
- Developed by: Sarmad Khoosat
- Written by: M. Afzal Bashir
- Directed by: Kanwal Khoosat
- Starring: Sania Saeed; Nauman Ijaz; Uzma Hassan
- Country of origin: Pakistan
- Original language: Urdu
- No. of episodes: 15

Production
- Producer: Irfan Khoosat
- Editor: Sarmad Khoosat
- Running time: 35–45 minutes
- Production company: Khoosat Films

Original release
- Network: PTV Home
- Release: 2011 – 2011

Aao Kahani Buntay Hain (Urdu: آؤ کہانی بنتے ہیں, lit. 'Let's Spin a Yarn') is a 2011 Pakistani television series directed by Kanwal Khoosat and produced by Irfan Khoosat. It was broadcast by PTV Home. It stars Nauman Ijaz and Sania Saeed in lead roles in the characters of a writer husband and a historian wife respectively, who play roles in their own conceived stories.

At the 12th Lux Style Awards, it won Best TV Actor-Terrestrial to Ijaz, out of four nominations.

== Plot summary ==
The series revolves around a married couple who has artistic nature. The historian wife and the writer husband, has a warm relationship and share a close bond with each other. At every night, they conceived their stories and themselves play the roles of the characters of these stories.

== Cast ==
- Nauman Ijaz
- Sania Saeed
- Uzma Hassan

== Production ==
Sarmad Khoosat, the producer, shared that the series faced rejection from multiple networks due to its unique and creative content, which was considered unconventional.

== Awards and nominations ==
Year	Awards	Category	Nominee(s)/ recipient(s)	Result	Ref.
2012	Lux Style Awards	Best TV Play-Terrestrial	Aao Khanai Buntay Hain	Nominated	
2012	Lux Style Awards	Best TV Director	Kanwal Khoosat	Nominated	
2012	Lux Style Awards	Best TV Actor-Terrestrial	Nauman Ijaz	Won	
2012	Lux Style Awards	Best TV Actress-Terrestrial	Sania Saeed	Nominated	
