= Chokher Bali (2003 film) =

- Directed by: Rituparno Ghosh
- Based on: Chokher Bali by Rabindranath Tagore
- Produced by: Shrikant Mohta; Mahendra Soni
- Starring: Aishwarya Rai; Raima Sen; Prosenjit Chatterjee; Tota Roy Chowdhury; Lily Chakravarty
- Cinematography: Avik Mukhopadhyay
- Edited by: Arghyakamal Mitra
- Music by: Debojyoti Mishra
- Production company: Shree Venkatesh Films
- Release date: 2 October 2003 (India)
- Running time: 143 minutes
- Country: India
- Language: Bengali
- Budget: ₹25 million

Chokher Bali (Bengali pronunciation: [tʃokʰer bali]; lit. 'A grain of sand in the eyes'; transl. Eyesore) is a 2003 Indian Bengali-language epic period romantic drama film co-written and directed by Rituparno Ghosh. Produced by Shrikant Mohta and Mahendra Soni under the banner of Shree Venkatesh Films, the film is based on Rabindranath Tagore's 1903 eponymous novel. It stars Prosenjit Chatterjee, Aishwarya Rai, Tota Roy Chowdhury and Raima Sen in lead roles, while Lily Chakravarty, Tina Dutta, Mousumi Saha play supporting roles, with Swastika Mukherjee in a special appearance. The film explores the extramarital affair between Binodini (Rai), a young widow, and Mahendra (Prosenjit), an old suitor of hers, the complicated friendship with Asha (Raima), Mahendra's wife, and her mutually conflicting feelings with Behari (Tota), Mahendra's childhood best friend. The film was later dubbed into Hindi and was released internationally in that language.

Upon release, Chokher Bali met with critical review and positive box office reception.

Chokher Bali won the National Film Award for Best Feature Film in Bengali, National film award for best costume design, and National film award for best art direction. It was nominated for the Golden Leopard (Best Film) award at the Locarno International Film Festival in 2003. The film screened at the 34th International Film Festival of India on 19 October. It was the Official Selection at the Chicago International Film Festival in 2003 and was showcased in over 25 international festivals, including the Toronto International Film Festival.

== Plot ==
In the early 20th century, Binodini is a young Bengali Hindu girl who is left to her own devices when her sickly husband dies on the day after their wedding. She returns to her village and lives there for a couple of months until she sees one of her aunts, another Bengali Hindu widow named Rajalakshmi passing by. Binodini hails Rajalakshmi and she agrees that it would be best if Binodini came to live with her and her family at their North Kolkata residence. Rajalakshmi's son, Mahendra, an aspiring medical practitioner studying in the Calcutta Medical College, was one of the first suitors to see Binodini's photo when she was proposed as a prospective bride for him, yet he refused her on account of his being "unready for marriage."

When Binodini arrives with her aunt, Mahendra and his new bride Ashalata (whom Binodini befriends & call each other by the nickname (Note: In the olden days in Bengal, women and girls who were best friends would often set a common nickname for themselves and address each other by that name.) of Chokher Bali, literally meaning 'grain of sand in the eye', figuratively meaning 'eyesore' in Bengali) are constantly sneaking off to be alone together. Mahendra's infatuation with Ashalata makes him introduce cooking non-vegetarian food into the household, to which the conservative Vaishnavite Rajalakshmi protests by leaving the house & going away to Kashi (Note: Many old Hindus, following the ideal of vanaprastha would withdraw themselves away from their families to live out the last days of their life in a secluded manner, in a tirtha performing religious activities. For Bengali Hindus, the most common destinations for this purpose were Varanasi & Vrindavana.) to live out the rest of her life. However, this infatuation does not last long, and the thoroughly Westernised Mahendra soon begins to see that the English-speaking, witty Binodini is more his type than his traditionalist, naive housewife Ashalata. Mahendra also feels insecure when Ashalata expresses appreciation for Mahendra's childhood best friend Behari's physical features & Behari, in turn, expresses appreciation for Binodini's beauty. To spite Behari, Mahendra starts an affair with Binodini, and this is soon revealed to Ashalata who, unaware of her pregnancy, leaves Mahendra out of grief to live with Rajalakshmi. On coming to know about the affair, Rajalakshmi expels Binodini from the house. That night, Binodini seeks out Behari and pleads him to marry her, but the traditionalist Behari, true to his values, rejects her advances (since at that time he harboured feelings for Ashalata, for whom he was initially chosen as a groom before Mahendra was infatuated with her photo). With no other option left, Binodini leaves Kolkata for her village. Mahendra comes there to mend their relationship which she refuses. Instead, she makes him promise to take her to Behari, who had gone to Kashi on being informed about Rajalakshmi's failing health. At Kashi, Mahendra gets to know about Rajalakshmi's death, he apologizes to Ashalata & takes her back to Kolkata. Binodini meets Behari who, after some incidents, agrees to marry her. However, on the day of their wedding, Binodini vanishes, leaving a letter for Behari & another for Ashalata, apologising for interrupting in her marital bliss.

== Soundtrack ==
The film's background score is by Debojyoti Mishra and, notably, it contains no playback singing. Sreela Majumdar dubbed for Aishwarya Rai and Sudipta Chakraborty dubbed for Raima Sen.

== Cast ==
- Aishwarya Rai as Binodini (Voice dubbed by Sreela Majumdar)
- Prosenjit Chatterjee as Mahendra
- Raima Sen as Ashalata (Voice dubbed by Sudipta Chakraborty)
- Lily Chakravarty as Rajalakshmi, Mahendra's mother
- Tota Roy Chowdhury as Behari
- Shuchita Roychowdhury as Annapurna, Ashalata's maternal aunt (Voice dubbed by Rituparno Ghosh)
- Mousumi Saha as Swarna
- Tina Dutta as Manorama
- Ratna Ghoshal the woman accompanying the English missionary
- Swastika Mukherjee as a young courtesan
- Anindya Chatterjee and Upal Sengupta occur as the students
- Sudeshna Roy as Kamal

== Critical reception ==
Aishwarya received critical acclaim for her performance as Binodini. In Anandabazar Patrika, Chandril Bhattacharya praised the film for its direction, screenplay, background score, sound design, cinematography, production design as well as the dubbing by Sudipta Chakraborty. Margaret Pomeranz of ABC Australia gave it 3 out of 5 stars, saying that "the insight it gives into Indian culture and customs, is interesting and that tends to overcome the slight impatience with the overload of emotions." David Stratton, also of ABC, gave the film 3.5 out of 5 stars, commenting on how the film version was edited 40 minutes shorter but that it was beautifully acted and fascinating.

== Box office ==
The film was declared a hit at the box office.

== Other titles ==
- Chokher Bali: A Passion Play (International: English title)
- Sand in the Eye (India: English title)
