= Chokher Bali (novel) =

Novel by Rabindranath Tagore

- Author: Rabindranath Tagore
- Translator: Krishna Kripalani; Surendranath Tagore
- Language: Bengali
- Genre: Novel
- Published: Serialised 1902-03; Book form 1903
- Publication place: India
- English publication date: 1959
- Media type: Print

Chokher Bali (চোখের বালি) is a 1903 Bengali novel by Rabindranath Tagore that revolves around the central character Binodini and her relationships with three individuals. It explores the extramarital affair between Binodini, a young widow, and Mahendra, an old suitor of hers, the complicated friendship with Asha, Mahendra's wife, and her mutually conflicting feelings with Behari, Mahendra's childhood best friend. The novel also highlights issues of female literacy, child marriage, patriarchy within the family, and the fate of widows during that era.

== Title ==
The title of the book can be translated as "a grain of sand", a "constant irritant to the eye", or an "eyesore". "Eyesore" was used as the title for its first English translation by Surendranath Tagore published in 1914. Tagore used Binodini as a working title before its publication.

== Writing and publication history ==
Tagore prepared himself for writing the novel by writing a spree of short stories and it was his first serious effort at a novel. He began working on the novel in 1898 or 1899, and a draft version was completed in 1901.

It was first serialized from 1902 to 1903 in the periodical Bangadarshan, then published as a full book in 1903. Some passages were deleted in the initial serialization and publication, but partly restored in the anthology Rabindra Rachanabali published in 1941, with more restored in an independent edition in 1947.

Tagore wrote of it: "I have always regretted the ending".

== Translation and adaptations ==
Promotional booklet for a production of Chokher Bali, 1938

=== Translations ===
The first English translation of Chokher Bali was by Surendranath Tagore which appeared in The Modern Review in 1914. It was then translated into English by Krishna Kripalani and published under the title of Binodini in 1959 by the Sahitya Akademi. It was also translated under its original title by Sukhendu Ray (2005) and Radha Chakravarty (2012). It has been translated into other non-Indian languages including Russian (1959) and Chinese (1961); and into most of the Indian languages including Hindi, Gujarati, Kannada, Kashmiri ,Malayalam, Marathi, Punjabi, Sindhi, Tamil, Telugu, Assamese (translated by Mahendra Bora, 1968) and Urdu. A transliteration in Devanagari script, with footnotes in Hindi, was also published by the Sahitya Akademi in 1961.

=== Adaptations ===
==== India ====
Chokher Bali has been adapted a number of times in film, television and theatre. A stage adaptation was first performed in 1904, and the movie Chokher Bali (1938 film) directed by Satu Sen was released in 1938, which Tagore saw and he expressed his satisfaction with the performance in the film. Other versions have been produced on screen and television, for example, Chokher Bali by Rituparno Ghosh in 2003, and in the television series Stories by Rabindranath Tagore in 2015 by Anurag Basu. The Indian Bengali-language television serial Chokher Bali, which aired on Zee Bangla from 2015 to 2016, was adapted from the novel.

==== Pakistan ====
In Pakistan, the novel was adapted in 2010 by Sarmad Khoosat as a television series, Kalmoohi.
