= Chokher Bali (1938 film) =

1938 film

Chokher Bali is a Bengali drama film directed by Satu Sen based on the same name novel of Rabindranath Tagore. This film was released on 30 July 1938 under the banner of Associated Producers. This is the first film adaptation of Chokher Bali.

== Plot ==
This movie revolves around an extramarital affair between a young widow, Binodini, and Mahendra. Mahendra's wife Ashalata is a good friend of Binodini. For her feelings of love and affection, Binodini comes to stay with Mahendra's family. Behari, Mahendra's best childhood friend also gets mentally involves with Binodini.

== Cast ==
- Chhabi Biswas as Bihari
- Rama Banerjee as Annapurna
- Manoranjan Bhattacharya as Sadhucharan
- Haren Mukherjee as Mahendra
- Suprava Mukherjee as Binodini
- Santilata Ghosh as Rajlakshmi
- Indira Roy as Ashalata
- Atri Guha Thakurta
- Sibkali Chatterjee

== Reaction of Tagore ==
Rabindranath himself watched the movie while staying at Jorasanko and later he wrote a letter on 4 August 1938 from Santiniketan that:

while staying in Calcutta I had the opportunity to see the ''cinema -natya'' Chokher Bali in the Jorasanko House. I was especially satisfied with the praiseworthy acting skill. The way the actors were able to express the tremendous inner conflict of the hero-heroines leading to an exciting document speaks of real credit on their part...
