= Nida Khan =

Indian activist

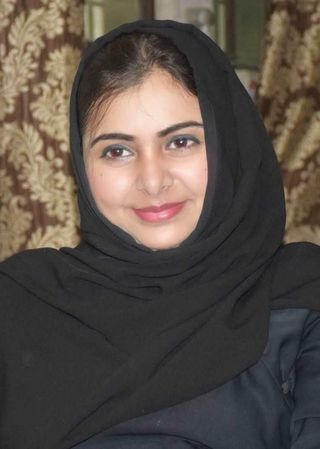
- Born: 30 April 1994 (age 32); Bareilly, Uttar Pradesh
- Education: M.Com & LLB
- Alma mater: St. Francis Convent School Bareilly
- Known for: Social activism
- Title: Indian Malala
- Spouse: Sheeran Raza Khan (2015-2016)

Nida Khan is Indian women’s rights activist known for her advocacy against practices such as instant triple talaq, polygamy, domestic violence, and nikah halala within the Muslim community. She is the founder of the non-profit organization Ala Hazrat Helping Society, through which she works to support and counsel Muslim women facing social and marital challenges.is an Indian women's rights activist who experienced the Instant triple talaq. A fatwa was issued by Khurshid Alam Razvi, a Mufti calling for social boycott of Nida for speaking out against practices of Triple Talaq. She is the founder of Ala Hazrat Helping Society, a non-governmental organization.

== Personal life and controversies ==
Nida Khan got married on February 18, 2015, after which she was pressured for dowry. She claimed, her husband assaulted her which led to her having a miscarriage. Later her husband gave her an instant triple talaq, and she was kicked out of the home on July 17, 2015.

Through her new non-profit group, Ala Hazrat Helping Society, Nida Khan now counsels other Muslim women to protect them from harmful traditions like triple talaq, polygamy, domestic violence, and Nikah halala, a practice which is forbidden in Islam, which involves a female divorcee marrying another man, consummating the marriage, and then getting a divorce – all to allow her former husband to remarry her.

She has also been involved in forced religious conversion of hindu women assisted by AIMIM.
