= Myra Sajid =

- Born: Sajid Zaki; 10 June 1975 (age 51); Lahore, Pakistan
- Citizenship: Pakistan
- Education: Graduate
- Occupations: Director, editor, actor and playwright
- Spouse: Myra Asad
- Relatives: Shahid Zaki
- Writing career
- Pen name: Myra Sajid
- Language: Urdu
- Period: 2001 to present
- Genre: Male
- Notable works: Neeli Chatri; Numm

Myra Sajid (Urdu: مائرہ ساجد) (born as Sajid Zaki) is a Pakistani dramatist, playwright and scriptwriter. He is well known for his drama series Neeli Chatri (Blue Umbrella) about women's social issues, directed by Ahson Talish. His screenplay for the serial Numm was his second collaboration with Talish.

== Personal life ==
Sajid Zaki was born into a Muslim family to Muhammad Zaki and Naeema Akhter in Lahore. His father was a shoe maker. He did his graduation in commerce. Afterward he realised his inner and did two year diploma in sculpture then one year diploma in multimedia and 3d animation.

In October 2009, he married Myra Asad, who encouraged his career and Sajid started writing for TV dramas with the pseudonym Myra Sajid.
