= The Ghost (TV series) =

Pakistani television drama series

- Based on: The Ghost by Danielle Steel
- Written by: Umera Ahmad
- Directed by: Babar Javed
- Starring: Sania Saeed; Faysal Quraishi; Samina Peerzada; Savera Nadeem
- Opening theme: "Tanha Chala" by K. K.
- Country of origin: Pakistan
- Original language: Urdu
- No. of episodes: 20

Production
- Producer: Momina Duraid
- Cinematography: Shahzad Kashmiri
- Running time: 30–40 minutes
- Production company: Moomal Productions

Original release
- Network: Hum TV
- Release: 2008 – 2009

The Ghost is a 2008 Pakistani television series directed by Babar Javed and written by Umera Ahmad, based on eponymous novel by Danielle Steel. It stars Faysal Quraishi, Sania Saeed, Savera Nadeem, Samina Peerzada, and Nadia Jamil. The Ghost revolves around an architect who, after his divorce, goes to Scotland and discovers an old castle where he learns to realise the meaning of love.

At the 9th Lux Style Awards, Saeed won Lux Style Award for Best TV Actress - Satellite for her performance.

== Premise ==
A wealthy businessman lives a happy life with his wife. However, after ten years of marriage, she falls for her office colleague and decides to separate from her husband. After divorce, the heartbroken husband goes to Scotland to distract from the pain of the broken marriage. There, he becomes intrigued by a peculiar old castle owned by an older lady. There he meets another beautiful lady and becomes smitten with her. Discovering revelations one and after another, he comes to realise nothing is as it seems.

== Plot ==
In the last seven years of his married life Ayaan Danyal has focused on his career of architect and almost ignored his wife Ayeza. On the occasion of their tenth wedding anniversary, Ayeza demands of him a divorce due to the loveless marriage. She wants to marry her colleague Sameer Gardezi after the divorce. Despite having ignored his wife so much, Ayaan is truly loyal to her, loves her and doesn't want to divorce her. Despite giving him a second chance on his request, Ayeza becomes a victim of conflict between Sameer and Ayaan, and one day goes away from him and sends him the divorce papers when he is outside the city. He tries to converse her but she is not ready for anything. On his friend's insistence, he also signs the divorce papers. After their divorce, Ayeza stills cares for her and asks for his condition frequently.

To forget the bitter memories of his past, he goes to the UK, where he does nothing except roam and wander. In Scotland he faces a minor road mishap and comes across Miss Marina who lives alone there in a nearby castle. She tells him that her husband has passed away and her son lives in another city. He experiences several spooky incidents; one night, he hears the sound of violin, and in the morning compliments Marina on her violin playing, however she states she doesn't know to play the violin. When he goes outside, Marina says to someone that Ayaan heard them playing violin. While looking for the books of Marina's deceased husband in a room, he finds booklet, a personal diary of Maya according to Marina, who had lived there as a paying guest.

Through the diary, he comes to know that Maya lived in India with her parents and was waiting for Aryan who was brought up by her parents and now wants to marry her. However, at the time of wedding it becomes known that Aryan will not come and the marriage is called off. The depressed Maya considered going to the UK to know the reason for his refusal. She received a letter from Aryan's friend, Adam, where he told her that Aryan wanted to marry someone else in the UK. A few days later, she received the letter from Aryan where he told her that he missed her. Upon seeing the date on the letter, which was just one week before Adam's letter, she wondered what could have happened in that one week to have changed everything. Further, she was sure of the love that she observed in his eyes. For many days, she kept dreaming of Aryan caught up in trouble near a castle. Eventually, she decided to go to the UK to ascertain the matter without telling her parents.

The diary ends but Ayaan is left with suspense and is curious to learn more about Maya's story. He asks Marina about her but she claims to know nothing. In a nearby park, he comes across a child, Rumaiyya, and becomes her friend, but her mother Sana scolds her for playing with him and seems to dislike Aryaan. Sana has a traumatic past due to her relation with her husband, Mansoor Kareem, who is a popular singer in Pakistan. During a difficult phase of his career, Sana used to encourage him, but upon gaining stardom he started hiding his married status which upset Sana badly. It created a conflict between, affected their relationship and they divorced, with Sana and her daughter moving to the UK.

While looking for some instruments, Ayaan finds another of Maya's diaries, where he comes to know that Maya reached Scotland and looked for Aryan at the address listed on the letters, but couldn't find him. While wandering, she came across a Hindustani man, Michael, who helped her.

Mansoor comes to the UK and promises to Rumaiyya, his daughter, that he'll meet her. Despite his promise, he doesn't come and she locks herself in the room. Sana then calls Ayaan who convinces her to come out of the room and promises to bring her to meet with her father. He and Sana take her to Mansoor who yells at them for bringing her to him. Rumaiyya learns that her parents have divorced.

Maya goes to the castle with Michael where Aryan supposedly lives with his friend Adam but finds nobody there. It was the same castle that she often saw in her dreams. On returning to his house, Maya falls ill, and again starts looking for him after her recovery. After trying for many days she was about to return home, but decides to go to the castle one last time. On arrival, they decide to stay in the castle due to it getting dark outside. Maya goes to sleep and wakes up anxiously after seeing the clear visual of her past dream. She sees that Michael has shot Aryan outside the castle. She comes to know that he is actually Adam who has been helping her under the name Michael for all this time. During her interrogation of him, he confesses that while hunting birds, he had accidentally shot Aryan and killed him. He burnt Aryan's dead body and didn't tell anyone due to the fear of being arrested. He keeps begging for forgiveness but she refuses, and returns to Hindustan.

Ayaan feels sympathy for Sana due to her situation being similar to his own. They share their bitter past experiences with each other and bond, becoming friends.

In her house, Maya feels anxious and starts thinking about Adam. She realises that she loves him, and thus leaves for Scotland. She forgives the already ashamed Adam and eventually marries him. After their marriage, they spend their life in the castle.

Ayaan looks for the bakery which Miss Marina had told him about a few days ago, but can't find it. He wonders, knowing that the bakery had been here about forty years ago. Miss Marina gets worried and tells Ayaan that her son, who was coming to meet her, has died in a train accident. Ayaan brings it up with Sana who tells him that there wasn't any news about a train accident on any news channel, nor did the Railway authorities know anything about the supposed accident. The castle telephone rings and Miss Marina, from the other side of the line, tells Ayaan that he has gone to his son's house and will not soon return. If he wants to go back, he can. The phone cuts and Ayaan is shocked to realise that the telephone has no connection. The scared Ayaan leaves the castle and goes to Sana, who is stunned to know that he has been living in that castle for so many days with Miss Marina, who died some forty years ago. Sana tells him that the castle was taken by a man on lease for his Indian wife and that after her accidental death, it went to Miss Marina. Her husband returned twenty years after their marriage and their son died in a train accident upon returning from London. He understands the mystery of the castle and goes back there one last time before returning to Pakistan. He tells Sana that the story of Maya has taught him the true meaning of love.

Eleven months have passed since Ayaan came to Pakistan. He visits Ayeza who meets him with her newborn and they discuss on different things. In the end, he tells her about the pregnancy of his wife Sana.

== Cast ==
- Faysal Quraishi as Ayaan Danyal
- Nadia Jamil as Ayeza Farooqi
- Asif Raza Mir as Sameer Gardezi
- Samina Peerzada as Miss Marina
- Sania Saeed as Maya Kapoor
- Badar Khalil as Mrs. Kapoor
- Shehryar Zaidi as Mr Kapoor
- Amber Khan as Mahima
- Rehan Sheikh as Aryan
- Savera Nadeem as Sana
- Ahmed Jahanzeb as Mansoor Kareem
- Ismail Bashay as Adam
- Farah Nadir as Ayaan's PA (Episode 1)
- Mahjabeen Habib as Samiya (Episode 1)

== Soundtrack ==
The OST of the series "Tanha Chala" is sung by K. K. Momina Duraid wrote the lyrics. Farrukh Abid and Shoaib Farrukh composed the music.

== Production ==
The Ghost was based on eponymous novel by Danielle Steel with screenplay by renowned Pakistani screenwriter Umera Ahmad. The roles played Sania Saeed and Samina Peerzada were originally a single one in the novel which was split for the television adaptation. Immediately after working on Jhumka Jaan, Saeed flew to Scotland for the filming of The Ghost and Khamoshiyaan one after the other.

The serial was shoot in Karachi and Scotland.

== Reception ==
=== Reviews ===
In a review of the drama, Masala.com stated that it is an underrated show and described it as highly female oriented show.

=== Awards ===
Year	Award	Category	Recipient(s)/ nominee(s)	Result	Ref.
2010	Lux Style Awards	Best TV Actress - Satellite	Sania Saeed	Won	

== Legacy ==
Faysal Quraishi listed The Ghost among his best performances. Sania Saeed stated that The Ghost was one of her favourite serials.
