= Chokher Bali (TV series) =

2015 Indian TV series

- Title Screen
- Genre: Romance, Drama
- Based on: Chokher Bali by Rabindranath Tagore
- Screenplay by: Anuja Chatterjee; Dialogues; Anuja Chatterjee
- Starring: Rezwan Rabbani Sheikh; Rohit Samanta; Sudipta Roy; Tania Ganguly
- Voices of: Madhuraa Bhattacharya
- Opening theme: Chokhe Amaar Trishna
- Composer: Debjit Roy
- Country of origin: India
- Original language: Bengali
- No. of seasons: 1
- No. of episodes: 249

Production
- Producer: Shibaji Panja
- Production locations: West Bengal; Varanasi
- Running time: 22 Minutes
- Production companies: Vandana Films and enterprises

Original release
- Network: Zee Bangla
- Release: 30 March 2015 – 9 January 2016

Related
- Rai Kishori

Chokher Bali (English: Sands in the eye) is a Bengali language television serial which aired on the Indian general entertainment channel Zee Bangla.

== Synopsis ==
Set in the early twentieth century, the story revolves around the lives of Mahendra, Ashalata, Binodini and Behari. Binodini, a beautiful young widow happened to stay with a newlywed couple, Mahendra and Ashalata. The beauty and charm of Binodini soon enchants Mahendra towards her. But as time progresses, Binodini gets drawn towards Mahendra's friend, the idealist Behari. How Binodini becomes the Chokher Bali for Ashalata forms the trajectory of the story. The story, carved beautifully by Tagore, is a reflection of man-woman relationship and much more.

== Cast ==
- Rezwan Rabbani Sheikh as Bihari
- Rohit Samanta as Mahendra
- Sudipta Roy as Ashalata
- Tania Ganguly as Binodini
- Nandini Ghoshal / Chaitali Mukhopadhyay as Rajlaxmi
- Kaushiki Guha as Annapurna
- Neel Mukherjee as Bipin
- Shyamoupti Mudly as Sarju
- Rumpa Chatterjee as Choto Kakima
- Ritoja Majumder as Binodini's Aunt
- Animesh Bhaduri as Phulu
- Nibedita Biswas as Jamuna
- Sujoy Saha as Somu
