= Farooq Zameer =

Pakistani actor

- فاروق ضمیر
- Born: 1941
- Died: 23 February 2017 (aged 75–76); Lahore, Pakistan
- Occupation: Actor
- Years active: 1965–2013

Farooq Zameer was a Pakistani actor.

== Early life and education ==
After earning his Masters in English literature from the Government College University, Lahore, he began his acting career in the 1960s while also being a businessman by profession.

His uncle Ghori was also an actor, better known for his comic roles in the 1930s and the 1940s in pre-partition India, while another uncle Fazal Kamal was a director and producer associated with the state-run broadcaster Pakistan Television (PTV).

== Career ==
=== Actor ===
Beginning his career with PTV in the 1960s, he was better known for his roles in the 1980s and the 1990s.

=== Director, producer and playwright ===
He also directed and produced serials and wrote more than 40 plays.

== Other work ==
=== Professional career ===
For some time he was the head of the publications division of the National Engineering Services Pakistan Limited (NESPAK).

== Illness and death ==
He died in February 2017, at the age of 76. He was survived by his wife, three sons and a daughter.

== Awards and nominations ==
He was awarded the Pride of Performance award in 2001.

== Notable serials ==
Following are some his notable serials:

- Guriya
- Shamail and Suragh-i-Zindagi
- Mukmala Aur Mahira
- Khandan-i-Shughlia
- Tum Bhi Kaho
- Kaghaz Ki Nao
