= Mahendra Bora =

Assamese poet, critic and educationist (1929–1996)

- মহেন্দ্ৰ বৰা
- Born: 22 August 1929; Tingkhang, Dibrugarh district, Assam, British India
- Died: 9 April 1996 (aged 66)
- Education: Cotton College; University of Calcutta; Gauhati University
- Occupations: Poet, critic, essayist, translator, educationist
- Writing career
- Language: Assamese
- Notable works: Jatismar (1961); The Evolution of Assamese Script

Mahendra Bora (22 August 1929 – 9 April 1996) was an Assamese-language poet, literary critic, essayist, translator, and educationist from India. He presided over the Pathsala session of the Asam Sahitya Sabha, the premier literary body of Assam, in 1987.

== Early life ==
Mahendra was born at Tingkhang in Dibrugarh district. He graduated from Cotton College in 1951, took a master's degree in English from the University of Calcutta in 1953, and received a doctorate from Gauhati University in 1971.

== Career ==
He taught at Cotton College and in Dibrugarh, served as principal of Goalpara College and Bilasipara College, and later held the Bezbaroa Chair of professorship at Dibrugarh University.

As a poet, Bora belonged to the modernist generation associated with the literary magazine Ramdhenu in the 1950s. His poetry collections include Jatismar (1961), Ei Nodiyedi (1973), Rupar Tilingar Mat (1983), Nila Dhaturar Phul (1987), and Jiban Ek Astabal (1995). His critical and scholarly works include Asomiya Kabitar Chandar Silpatatva, a study of metre in Assamese poetry, and the English-language monographs Fundamentals of Assamese Metre and The Evolution of Assamese Script. He translated works including the Mahabharata, the Gita, and Don Quixote into Assamese. He wrote his autobiography, Upala Nadir Dare in 1990.

== Honours and Awards ==
His honours included recognition as a poet at the national symposium of All India Radio in 1968 and the Sankardeva Award of the Government of Assam in 1994.

== See also ==
- Assamese literature
