= 1st Hum Awards =

2013 Pakistani entertainment awards

- The promotional logo of the 1st Hum Awards, 2013
- Date: 12 March 2013; 28 April 2013 (televised)
- Site: Expo Center, Karachi, Sindh, Pakistan.
- Hosted by: Mikaal Zulfiqar (main); Mahira Khan (main); Vasay Chaudhry (co-host)
- Produced by: Naseer Saeed Janjua
- Directed by: Nadeem J.

Highlights
- Best Drama Serial (Jury): Shehr-e-Zaat
- Most awards: Meray Qatil Meray Dildar and Shehr-e-Zaat (3)
- Most nominations: Meray Qatil Meray Dildar (10)

Television coverage
- Channel: Hum TV
- Network: Hum
- Duration: 2 hours, 30 minutes (approx.)
- Ratings: 5 million 4.4

The 1st Servis Hum Awards Ceremony (referred to as Hum Awards), presented by the Hum Television Network and Entertainment Channel (HTNEC) honour the best dramas of 2012 of Hum and to honour achievement in Fashion and Music. The ceremony took place on 12 March, 2013, at the Expo Center in Karachi and was televised on 28 April 2013. During the ceremony, the Hum Channel presented Awards in 24 regular categories along with in 3 honorary and in 2 special categories. The ceremony was televised in Pakistan by Hum TV.

The events were hosted by Mikaal Zulfiqar, Mahira Khan, Vasay Chaudhry.

Shehr-e-Zaat won three awards including Best Drama Serial for Momina Duraid, Abdullah Kadwani & Asad Qureshi. Mere Qatil Mere Dildar won two awards, including Best Supporting Actress for Shagufta Ejaz. Sanjha won two awards including Best Director for Farooq Rind. Humsafar also won two awards. Mahira Khan won the Best Actress award for her role in Shehr-e-Zaat. Noman Ejaz won Best Actor for portraying the promising character in Bari Aapa.

== Winners and nominees ==
The nominees for public voting were announced on 20 February, 2013, and the rest of the categories were announced on 12 March 2013, through the official website of HUM TV and by Mikaal Zulfiqar Host of 1st Annual Hum Awards, and actress Mahira Khan. Seven categories were set to be open for voting by viewers.

=== Awards ===
Winners are listed first.

==== Television ====
Best Drama Serial	Best Director Drama Serial
Shehr-e-Zaat –Momina Duraid, Asad Qureshi and Abdullah Kadwani; Mere Qatil Mere Dildar – Momina Duraid; Maat – Amna Nawaz Khan; Roshan Sitara – Abdullah Kadwani and Humayun Saeed; Yahan Pyar Nahi Hai – Syed Afzal Ali; Bari Aapa – Momina Duraid	Farooq Rind –Sanjha; Sarmad Sultan Khoosat –Shehr-e-Zaat; Fahim Burney –Yahan Pyar Nahi Hai; Amna Nawaz Khan –Maat; Asim Ali –Mere Qatil Mere Dildar; Siraj ul Haq –Roshan Sitara; Haissam Hussain –Durr-e-Shahwar; Mehreen Jabbar –Mata-e-Jaan Hai Tu; Adnan Haroon – Bilqees Kaur; Saif-e-Hassan –Bari Aapa
Best Actor	Best Actress
Noman Ejaz –Bari Aapa; Ahsan Khan –Mere Qatil Mere Dildar; Adnan Siddiqui –Mere Qatil Mere Dildar; Mikaal Zulfiqar –Shehr-e-Zaat; Imran Aslam –Sanjha; Faisal Rehman –Zard Mausam	Mahira Khan –Shehr-e-Zaat; Mehwish Hayat –Mere Qatil Mere Dildar; Saba Qamar –Yahan Pyar Nahi Hai; Saba Qamar –Maat; Aamina Sheikh –Maat; Sanam Baloch –Roshan Sitara; Sania Saeed –Zard Mausam; Savera Nadeem –Bari Aapa
Best Supporting Actor	Best Supporting Actress
Mohib Mirza – Shehr-e-Zaat; Kashif Mehmood – Bilqees Kaur; Imran Aslam – Mohabbat Jaye Bhar Mein; Rehan Sheikh – Sanjha; Babar Khan – Ek Tamanna Lahasil Si	Shagufta Ejaz – Mere Qatil Mere Dildar; Samina Peerzada – Roshan Sitara; Saba Hameed – Ek Tamanna Lahasil Si; Sadia Imam – Bilqees Kaur; Sajjal Ali – Mere Qatil Mere Dildar; Hina Dilpazeer – Mohabbat Jaye Bhar Mein
Best Soap Actor	Best Soap Actress
Imran Aslam – Nikhar Gaye Gulab Sare; Danish Taimoor – Raju Rocket; Farhan Ali Agha – Mar Jain Bhi To Kya; Junaid Khan – Mujhay Roothnay Na Daina	Sumbul Iqbal – Raju Rocket; Komal Rizvi – Mujhay Roothnay Na Daina; Arij Fatyma – Mar Jain Bhi To Kya; Mawra Hocane – Nikhar Gaye Gulab Sare
Best Comic Actor	Best Comic Sitcom
Uroosa Siddiqui – Fun Khana; Ismail Tara – One Way Ticket; Danish Nawaz – Extras (The Mango People); Barkat Ali Siddiqui – Halka Na Lo	Danish Nawaz – Extras (The Mango People); Samina Ahmad – One Way Ticket; Salman Abbas (Nomi) – Halka Na Lo; Momina Duraid – Fun Khana
Best Drama Series	Best Soap Series
Kitni Girhain Baqi Hain – Angeline Malik (Solo Nominee)	Mujhay Roothnay Na Daina –Momina Duraid; Raju Rocket – Eveready Pictures; Nikhar Gaye Gulab Sare – Momina Duraid; Mar Jain Bhi To Kya – Momina Duraid
Best Writer Drama Serial	Best Host of the Year
Umera Ahmad – Maat; Umera Ahmad – Shehr-e-Zaat; Farhat Ishtiaq – Mata-e-Jaan Hai Tu; Aliya Bukhari – Mere Qatil Mere Dildar; Faiza Iftikhar – Yahan Pyar Nahi Hai; Faiza Iftikhar – Bilqees Kaur; Sarwat Nazir – Roshan Sitara; Syed Wasi Shah – Ek Tamanna Lahasil Si; Samira Fazal – Bari Aapa	Fahad Mustafa –Jago Pakistan Jago (Solo Nominee)
Best Television Sensation Male	Best Television Sensation Female
Shehryar Munawar Siddiqui –Meray Dard Ko Jo Zuban Miley	Suhaee Abro –Sanjha
Best Onscreen Couple	Best Original Soundtrack
Fawad Afzal Khan and Mahira Khan – Humsafar; Mikaal Zulfiqar and Mahira Khan – Shehr-e-Zaat; Ahsan Khan and Mehwish Hayat – Mere Qatil Mere Dildar	"Mere Qatil Mere Dildar" from Mere Qatil Mere Dildar – Sara Raza Khan and Sohail Haider; "Jab Se Roshan" from Roshan Sitara - Bilal Khan and Qurat-ul-Ain Balouch; "Mata-e-Jaan Hai Tu" from Mata-e-Jaan Hai Tu – Bilal Khan; "Babul angana preetam" from Sanjha –Sanam Marvi; "Ye nadamat kyun hai" from Nadamat – Rahat Fateh Ali Khan; "Jeet uski Hui" from Maat – Muhammad Ali

==== Music ====
Best Solo Artist	Best Music Video
Shehzad Roy – Apne Ullo; Abbas Ali Khan – Per Mein Hun Ruka Sa; Hadiqa Kiani – Jab say Tum; Faakhir Mehmood – Baliye	Baliye – Sayed Ali Raza; Ye zameen – Maram & Aabroo; Per main Hun Ruka Sa – Usman Mukhtar; Apne Ullo – Ehsan Rahim

==== Fashion ====
Best Model Male	Best Model Female
Abbas Jafri; Muhammad Mubarik Ali; Iffy; Athar Amin; Abdullah Ejaz	Ayyan; Neha Ahmed; Rabia Butt; Fouzia Aman; Nadia Ali; Amna Ilyas
Best Designer Menswear	Best Designer Womenswear
Deepak Perwani – DP-Deepak Perwani; Arsalan Yahseer – AY-Arsalan & Yahseer; Emran Rajput – ԐR-EMRAAN RAJPUT; Nauman Arfeen – Naushemian	Nomi Ansari – DNA-Diffusion by Nomi Ansari; Asifa and Nabeel – Asifa & Nabeel; Ali Xeeshan – Ali Xeeshan Signature Weddings; Fahad Hussain – Fahad Hussayn Trousseau; Nadia Azwar – Nadia Azwer Atelier; Zaheer Abbas – ÁΖ-Zaheer Abbas

=== Honorary Hum Awards ===
Hosted by Bushra Ansari, the honorary awards in TV and Music categories are presented to Pakistani artists.

Lifetime Achievement Award

- Moin Akhtar

Hum Honorary Award in Music

- Ustad Rais Khan

Hum Honorary Most Challenging Subject Award

- Razia Butt (Posthumous Award)
- Momina Duraid
- Haissam Hussain
- Samira Fazal

Hum Honorary Award in Television

- Nayyer Kamal
- Zaheen Tahira
- Munawer saeed
- Badar Khalil
- Qazi Wajid
- Qavi Khan
- Talat Hussain
- Anwar Maqsood
- Shakeel
- Abid Ali

Hum Honorary Phenomenal Serial Award

- Momina Duraid
- Farhat Ishtiaq
- Sarmad Sultan Khoosat
- Mahira Khan
- Fawad Khan
- Atiqa Odho
- Naveen Waqar
- Hina Khawaja Bayat
- Qaiser Naqvi
- Saba Faisal
- Sara Kashif
- Noor Hassan Rizvi
- Qurat-ul-Ain Balouch
- Waqar Ali
- Naseer Turabi
- Shehzad Kashmiri
- Tanveer

=== Dramas with multiple awards and nominations ===
The following 21 Dramas received multiple nominations:

Nominations	Drama
10	Mere Qatil Mere Dildar
6	Maat
6	Shehr-e-Zaat
6	Roshan Sitara
5	Bari Aapa
4	Yahan Pyar Nahi Hai
4	Bilqees Kaur
4	Sanjha
3	Mata-e-Jaan Hai Tu
3	Ek Tamanna Lahasil Si
3	Mujhay Roothnay Na Daina
3	Raju Rocket
3	Mar Jain Bhi To Kya
3	Nikhar Gaye Gulab Sare
2	Mohabbat Jaye Bhar Mein
2	Zard Mausam
2	Extras (The Mango People)
2	One Way Ticket
2	Humsafar
2	Halka Na Lo
2	Fun Khana

The following four dramas received multiple awards:

Awards	Drama
3	Shehr-e-Zaat
2	Humsafar
2	Sanjha
2	Mere Qatil Mere Dildar

== Presenters and performers ==
The following individuals were presented awards or performed musical numbers.

=== Presenters ===
Name(s)	Presented
Asim Raza; Ayyan	presenter of the awards of Hum Best Solo artist & Hum Best music video
Shebaz Khan (brand manager Telenor talk shalk); Nadia Hussain	Presenter of the award of Hum best model female
Ammar Ahmad (Marketing manager Nokia Pakistan); Vaneeza Ahmad	Presenter of the award of Hum Best model male
Tapu Javeri (Designer); Nabeela	Presenter of the awards of Hum Best designer Women's wear & Hum Best designer men's wear
Anwar Maqsood	presenter of the award of Hum lifetime Achievement Award
Shebaz Khan (brand manager Telenor talk shalk); Alamgir (pop singer)	Presenter of the award of Hum Best Original Sound Track
Adeel Hussain; Ayesha Omar	Presenter of the award of Hum best New TV sensation
Imran Momina (Fuzon Band pianist); Ayesha Omer	Presenter of the awards of Hum best comic actor & hum best Sitcom
Aijaz Aslam; Alishba Yousuf	Presenter of the awards of Hum Best Host & Hum best Drama series
Deepak Perwani; Angeline Malik	Presenter of the award of Hum Best Soap actor
Imran Abbas; Sanam Jung	Presenter of the award of Hum Best Soap actress
Misbah Khalid; Saqib Malik	Presenter of the award of Hum Best Soap series
Bushra Ansari; Duraid Qureshi (CEO Hum Network)	Presenter of the awards of Hum Special Recognition to Pakistan Television (TV Stalwarts)
Qavi Khan; Sanam Saeed	presenter of the awards of Hum most challenging subject
Sultana Siddiqui	Presenter of the awards of Phenomenal serial
Samina Peerzada; Javaid Sheikh	Presenter of the award of Hum Special Recognition In Music
Noor ul Huda Shah (writer)	Presenter of the award of Hum Best writer Drama serial
Saba Qamar; Noman Ejaz	Presenter of the award of Hum best director drama serial
Zeba Bakhtiyar; Ejaz Aslam	presenter of the award of Hum Best Supporting actress
Asif Raza Mir; Hina Khawaja Bayat	presenter of the award of Hum Best Supporting actor
Aamina Sheikh; Mohib Mirza	presenter of the award of Hum Best On Screen Couple
Atiqa Odho; M. Akram (Advisor to CEO Servis Sales Corp.)	Presenter of the award ofHum best drama serial
Samina Peerzada; Mian Shahzad (head of communication Servis corp)	Presenter of the award of Hum Best actor
Hasan Khaild (Comm. and trade mark. manager in service); Humayun Saeed	Presenter of the award of Hum Best actress

=== Performers ===
Name(s)	Role	Performed
Humayun Saeed	Performer	Performed on song with Noman Habib in order to promote his upcoming movie Mian Shahid Afridi Hun.
Ahsan Khan (actor); Mehwish Hayat	Performer	Performed on Bollywood songs "Mujhe To Teri Lut Lag Gaye" from Race 2, Matru Ki Bijlee Ka Mandola from the film by the same name and Biddu's remix of Nazia Hassan's and Zohaib Hassan's "Disco Deewanay"
Group Dancers	LED Act	An LED wear dress act by a girls on a musical Beats
Umer Sharif	Performer	Comic Act by himself.
Rabbi Shergill	Performer	Punjabi Indian artist Rabbi Shergill performed Challa, Bulla Ki Jana Mein Kaun, Tere Bin Sanu Sohniya and Challa again.
Fahad Mustafa	Performer	Tribute to Pakistani acclaimed singers Alamgir (pop singer), Atif Aslam, Ali Zafar and Zohaib Hassan
Humaima Malik	Performer	Performed on different Indian songs
Abida Parveen	Singer	Sang Naraye Mastana.

== Ceremony Information ==
The 1st Hum Awards were presented by Servis and powered by Telenor, Talk Shawlk and Nokia Lumia. The music was composed by Waqar Ali. In addition to hosting, the co-host Vasay Chaudry was the script writer, arranger, and writer of the ceremony. The main hosts were nominated for Best Actor in a lead role and Best Actress in a lead role.

=== Voting Trend and Summary ===
Voting Trend for 1st Hum Awards was very genuine and authentic. Awards have both involvement of Jury and Audience. At launching of Hum Awards Shazia Ramzi announces the voting trend and Categories for which the actors were nominated. Out of the 32 categories, seven categories are Viewers' Choice. Voting for viewers' choice was did through IVR, SMS & on Hum TV official Website from 20 February – 5 March 2013 (Voting and Nominations are closed now) The other categories will be judged by a specialist jury and includes, Best On-Screen Couple for which Fawad Khan and Mahira Khan are nominees for their appearance in the extremely popular series, Humsafar among others.

== Reception ==
The show received a mixed reception from media outlets and print publications, generally lauding Mahira Khan as a Host. People praise her much as a host. Mikaal also did a good job being doing a first full-fledged hosting. The whole ceremony was praised and watched by Pakistanis with full zenith, zeal and zest across the Globe.

=== Ali Pir Gul nomination ===
Pakistani comedian turned singer Ali Pir Gul was nominated at Hum awards in Music field but the team and management skips his nomination without knowing him which turned this news to a controversy.

== See also ==
- Lux Style Awards
- Nigar Awards
- Pakistan Media Awards
- PTV Awards
- Hum Awards
- List of Hum Awards Ceremonies
