= Mera Naseeb =

Pakistani television series

- Written by: Samira Fazal
- Directed by: Adnan Ahmed
- Starring: Syra Yousuf; Sanam Saeed; Imran Abbas; Adeel Hussain; Imran Aslam
- Country of origin: Pakistan
- Original language: Urdu
- No. of episodes: 21

Production
- Producer: Momina Duraid
- Camera setup: Multi-camera
- Running time: 38-42 minutes
- Production company: Momina Duraid Productions

Original release
- Network: Hum TV
- Release: 1 April – 21 August 2011

Mera Naseeb (transl. My fate) is a Pakistani television series, written by Samira Fazal, inspired by the novel Sister of My Heart by Chitra Divakaruni. It originally broadcast on Hum TV from 1 April 2011 to 21 August 2011. The serial has an ensemble cast of Syra Yousuf, Sanam Saeed, Imran Abbas, Adeel Husain, Sakina Samo, Samina Peerzada, Rubina Ashraf, Imran Aslam and Bushra Ansari. The story revolves around two half-sisters who were born at same time and whose fate is bound by a family secret.

== Plot ==
Sitting in the garden of their house, Shazia and Nazia are listening to the stories of their Phupi Ammi that they were born at the same time to different mothers. One day, Shazia decides that both her and Nazia should go and see the movie against their elders' permission. When they are told to pay the bill, Shazia refuses and starts a fight with the cashier. There a man comes who pays her bill and next day waits for her outside the college however they do not have enough money so Nazia tells him that she will pay him off in installments.

The man, Shehbaz starts to like Nazia and gives her his number. Nazia's mother Salima stops her from going to college thereafter. Both Shazia's and Nazia's weddings get fixed, Shazia's to an American educated man called Moeez and Nazia's to a man called Fahad, who has an overbearing mother. However, on the night of the wedding, Nazia's plans to flee with Shehbaz, only to be caught in the nick of time by her phoopi ammi.

After marriage, Moeez loses his job and ends up living in a small flat, whilst Shazia takes up a job in a primary school as a means of financial support. In Nazia's household, her husband finds out about Shehbaz, but does nothing. Things continue to get worse to Shazia, when her husband starts drinking and beating her, eventually they have to move back to Moeez's parents house because of money worries where Moreez is unable to stand for Shazia and is emerges that he only married Shazia to spite his father.

Whilst all this is happening, Nazia gets pregnant and her mother-in-law goes crazy as she wants a boy but Fahad forbids her to tell his mother that the baby is female, that they came to know by Sonography. Shazia has an argument with Moeez and moves back to her maternal home.

Moeez gets badly beaten up by Shehbaz, for harassing Nazia on the phone which makes him realise how much Shazia cares for him when she tends to his wounds. On Nazia's baby shower, the truth gets revealed about the baby's gender and Nazia's mother in law kicks her out and claims that the baby isn't even Fahad's. She then pesters Fahad to divorce Nazia, when he has already promised to stick by Nazia whatever happens. He then commits suicide due to the pressurised situation. On his funeral, his mother breaks down and begs Nazia's family for forgiveness, finally having realised her mistake.

When Nazia hears of his suicide she goes into early labour. Nazia takes her daughter to meet Fahad's mum, who apologises for what she has done and also encourages Nazia to marry Shehbaz. Shehbaz then meets Nazia and says that he is moving abroad, which prompts her to accept his proposal and make him stay.

== Cast ==
The cast of the series include:

- Syra Yousuf as Nazia
- Sanam Saeed as Shazia
- Samina Peerzada as Salima
- Sakina Samo as Habiba
- Rubina Ashraf as Sajida
- Imran Abbas as Moeez
- Adeel Hussain Shahbaz
- Imran Aslam as Fahad
- Bushra Ansari as Fahad's mother
- Sabahat Ali Bukhari as Moeez's mother
- Sajid Hassan as Moeez's father
- Ayesha Gul as Rafia
- Shagufta Ejaz
- Maheen Rizvi

=== Cameo ===
- Rehan Sheikh as Nazia's Father
- Ali Afzal as Shazia's Father

== Production ==
=== Casting ===
The role of Nazia was first supposed to be played by Mahira Khan in her television debut but as she was selected for Mehreen Jabbar's Neeyat, the role went to Syra Yousuf which marked her acting debut.

=== Controversy ===
The screenwriter of the series Samira Fazal was alleged to plagiarize the Indian author Chitra Banerjee Divakaruni's novel Sister of My Heart.

== Reception ==
A reviewer from Dawn praised its story and listed it among the dramas that challenge the stereotype. In an article by Mangobaaz, the main theme of the series was praised.

== Awards and nominations ==
Year	Awards	Category	Nominee(s)/ Recipient(s)	Result	Ref.
2012	Lux Style Awards	Best TV Writer	Samira Fazal	Won	
2012	Lux Style Awards	Best TV Serial Satellite	Mera Naseeb	Nominated	
2012	Lux Style Awards	Best TV Director	Adnan Ahmed	Nominated	
