= Durr-e-Shehwar =

Urdu-language Pakistani drama television series

- Also known as: Dhoop Chhaon
- Urdu: دُرّ شہوار
- Genre: Drama; Romance
- Written by: Umera Ahmad
- Directed by: Haissam Hussain
- Starring: Sanam Baloch; Samina Peerzada; Mikaal Zulfiqar; Qavi Khan; Nadia Jamil; Nauman Ijaz
- Country of origin: Pakistan
- Original language: Urdu
- No. of episodes: 15

Production
- Producers: Momina Duraid; Humayun Saeed; Shehzad Naseeb
- Running time: approx. 40:00
- Production companies: MD Productions; Six Sigma Plus

Original release
- Network: Hum TV
- Release: 10 March – 16 June 2012

Durr-e-Shehwar is a Pakistani drama series directed by Haissam Hussain and written by Umera Ahmad. First broadcast in Pakistan by Hum TV, Durr-e-Shehwar premiered on 10 March 2012 and was produced by Momina Duraid and Six Sigma Entertainment. The cast included Sanam Baloch, Samina Peerzada (both in title roles), Qavi Khan, Meekal Zulfiqar, Nauman Ejaz, and Nadia Jamil in lead roles. The last of the 15 episodes was aired on 16 June 2012.

The show was written and produced by the makers of Man-o-Salwa, Qaid-e-Tanhai, Malaal, Maat and Zindagi Gulzar Hai. The story explores the challenges of married life, whether in modern cities or traditional settings, highlighting the universal issues that can affect any relationship, and revolves around a strong-willed protagonist who navigates her marriage with patience and determination.

The series received critical acclaim with praise for Hussain's direction and the performances of the lead cast.

== Plot ==
Durr-e-Shehwar's daughter, Shandana, and her husband, Mansoor's nephew, Haider, have been married to each other for the last eight years. But recently, there has been a breach in their relationship so Shandana decides to spend some time at her maternal home in Murree along with her young daughter, Sophia.

Both Durr-e-Shehwar and Mansoor love Shandana and Sophia a lot. But Shandana envies her mother thinking she led a comfortable and happy life with a loving husband and nothing to worry about. And thus, she often compares Haider with her father. Shandana also undergoes a stage of semi-depression and evens thinks of divorcing Haider. When Mansoor gets to know this, he gets angry with Haider. He reports this matter to his sister, Haider's mother, thus, further complicating the situation. Unable to see Shandana in such a devastated condition, one-day Durr-e-Shehwar decides to narrate her own life story to Shandana and explain that life for her wasn't as easy as Shandana thinks it to be.

When Durr-e-Shehwar got married and moved to Mansoor's house, she faced many problems and lost all the comforts and respect that she took for granted in her father’s house. Durr E Shahwar, who’d thought that after her marriage, she’d move with Mansoor to his army-allotted house, had to stay with her in-laws, away from him. Mansoor's mother was cold towards her and did not appreciate her for her good qualities. Mansoor also saw her through the eyes of his mother and therefore disregarded all her efforts. Durr-e-Shehwar had struggled for years to gain her mother-in-law's acceptance and the true love of Mansoor, who had earlier neglected her because of his mother. Once or twice she even considered moving to her father’s house, but she persisted. Through these hardships, what gave her strength was her father’s letters and advice. The greatest advice he gave her when she told him she didn’t love Mansoor was to pretend until she did. Soon, Mansoor’s attitude changed, and he took her away with her, and her in-laws realised her worth. And when Shahwar saw that the average husband and man, Mansoor was a great father, she forgave him, although she never forgot.

Hearing this story, Shandana realised the difficulty of her mother's life. Shandana saw her father in a different light, but it calmed her and gave her the morale to start a new life with Haider, with her grandfather’s letters, which she inherited from her mother.

== Cast ==
- Sanam Baloch/ Samina Peerzada as Durr-e-Shehwar Mansoor: Mansoor's wife; Sami and Shehla's daughter; Mahnoor and Seher's sister; Mateen and Shandana's mother.
- Mikaal Zulfiqar/ Qavi Khan as Mansoor: Durr-e-Shehwar's husband; Safia's son; Saud, Fazeelat and Hafsa's brother; Mateen and Shandana's father.
- Nadia Jamil as Shandana Haider: Durr-e-Shehwar and Mansoor's daughter; Haider's cousin turned wife; Sophia's mother; Mateen's sister.
- Nauman Ejaz as Haider Qaiser: Fazeelat and Qaiser's son; Shandana's husband; Sophia's father.
- Sophia Syed as Sophia Haider: Shandana and Haider's daughter.
- Umer Naru as Saud : Mansoor, Fazeelat's and Hafsa's brother; Safia's son.
- Syed Mohammad Ahmed as Sami: Durr-e-Shehwar, Mahnoor and Seher's father; Shehla's husband.
- Saima Kanwal as Shehla Sami: Durr-e-Shehwar and Mahnoor's mother; Sami's wife.
- Saba Faisal as Safia: Mansoor, Saud, Fazeelat and Hafsa's mother.
- Khalid Butt as Mansoor, Saud, Fazeelat's and Hafsa's father
- Kiran Haq as Fazeelat: Mansoor, Saud and Hafsa's sister; Safia's daughter; Qaiser's wife; Haider's mother.
- Shazde Sheikh as Hafsa: Mansoor, Saud and Fazeelat's sister; Safia's daughter.
- Maya Ali as Mahnoor Sami: Durr-e-Shehwar and Seher's sister; Sami and Shehla's daughter.
- Nasreen Qureshi as Sami's sister.
- Sumbal Jamil as Farwa Hassan: Durr-e-Shehwar's neighbor in Murree
- Osman Khalid Butt as Hassan: Farwa's husband.
- Laila Zuberi as Mrs. Habib; Durr-e-Shehwar's friend.
- Sonia Nazir as Nazia: Durr-e-Shehwar's friend.

== Broadcast and release ==
It aired in India on Zindagi under the title Dhoop Chhaon, premiering on 21 October 2014.

Since mid-2020, it is available for online streaming on ZEE5 under the title Dhoop Chhaon.

== Reception ==
Durr-e-Shehwar received mostly positive reviews throughout its broadcast; gathered praise for its storyline, direction and performances (especially of the female leads, Peerzada and Baloch). Critics praised the storyline regarding the struggles of women towards marital relations and criticised the same for the depiction of working women as "selfish" and the constant sufferings of a girl. Hussain's direction was widely praised, with DAWN Images praising it in the words, "Using a clever balance of past, present and near past, director Haissam Hussain kept the momentum going in what might have been just another mazloom aurat (helpless woman) story."

=== Accolades ===
Date of ceremony	Award	Category	Recipient(s) and nominee(s)	Result	Ref.
2013	Hum Awards	Best Television Director	Haissam Hussain	Nominated	
2013	Lux Style Awards	Best Television Director	Haissam Hussain	Nominated	
