= Sarmad Masud =

British filmmaker

Sarmad Masud, also known as Sam Masud, is a British filmmaker whose 2017 movie My Pure Land was the first Urdu language film nominated by the UK for a Foreign Language Oscar award.

== Personal life ==
Sarmad Masud was born in Bradford to immigrant parents from Pakistan. He grew up in Nottingham. He studied filmmaking at Hull School of Art and Design in Yorkshire.

In 2012, he moved to London. In 2013, he married Caroline Bailey, a film art director and production designer.

== Career ==
After graduation, Masud wrote and directed Adha Cup (2009), a short film in Urdu about two men ineptly trying to reunite the cast of a Bollywood musical. According to the Macau Daily Times, it was "the first Urdu-language drama commissioned by British broadcaster Channel 4, which was later developed into a six-part series at the BBC." One reviewer called it "a delightful comedy adventure, a sort of bilingual Bollywood Blues Brothers by way of Nottingham."

Two Dosas (2014) was Masud's second short film as a director (he co-wrote it with Nikesh Shukla) and was funded by Film London. It is a comedy of an awkward date in an Indian restaurant, where Pavan had hoped to impress his English girlfriend. The film won both the London Calling Plus "Jury Award" (2014) and the Aspen Shortsfest's "Best Comedy" Short Film.

My Pure Land (2017), Masud's first feature-length film, was filmed in Pakistan. After reading a 2012 news story titled "Meet Nazo Dharejo: The toughest woman in Sindh," Masud wanted to make a movie about her armed defense of her family's land against her male relatives. The movie was filmed in Urdu rather than Sindhi. Sindhi classical dancer Suhaee Abro played the lead role of Nazo Dharejo. Masud's wife Caroline Bailey was the film’s production designer. Masud describes the film as "a modern-day feminist Western set in Pakistan, based on the extraordinary true story of one woman and her family who defended their home and land from 200 bandits".

After its debut showing at the 2017 Edinburgh International Film Festival, My Pure Land was selected as the British entry for the Best Foreign Language Film at the 2018 Oscars. It was the first Urdu-language film submitted by the UK for a Foreign Language Oscar. It did not, however, advance to the Academy's shortlist.

In 2017, Masud told an interviewer that he was planning two more movies to be filmed in Pakistan, as well as "a feel good underdog sports film".

In 2020, the BBC has scheduled Masud to direct a new four-part crime drama, based on the courtroom novel You Don’t Know Me. Masud's previous television directing experience includes season two of Sky One's police drama Bulletproof and several episodes of Channel 4's comedy-drama Ackley Bridge.
