= Samira Fazal =

Pakistani author and screenwriter

Samira Fazal سمیرا فضل
- Born: Karachi, Pakistan
- Occupations: Author, screenwriter, playwright
- Writing career
- Language: Urdu
- Notable works: Bari Aapa, Mera Naseeb, Dastaan, Mera Saaein
- Notable awards: 11th Lux Style Awards; Best Writer TV; 2012:Mera Naseeb; 1st Hum Awards; Brest Writer Drama Serial; 2013: Dastaan (Honorary Award for scripting Razia Butt Novel)
- Website: samirafazal.weebly.com

Samira Fazal (Urdu: سمیرا فضل) is a Pakistani author and screenwriter. She is best known for writing the scripts for the dramas Dastaan, Vasl, Khamoshiyan, Bari Aapa, and Mera Naseeb. She earned a Lux Style Award for Best TV Writer 2012.

== Early life and career ==
Fazal was born on 10 December 1976 in Sialkot, Punjab, Pakistan.

In 2014, Indian author Chitra Divakaruni claimed that the script of Fazal's drama serial Mera Naseeb was a plagiarized version of Divakaruni's book Sister of My Heart.

== Dramas and plays ==
Samira Fazal's works include:

- Alvida
- Badi Aapa
- Band Khirkyon Kay Peechay
- Chup Raho
- Dastaan, (Scripted for TV of Razia Butt one of 4 Famous Feminist Novel Bano)
- Mera Naseeb
- Mera Saaein
- Manay Na Ye Dil
- Mastana Mahi
- Mere Paas Paas & Mere Paas Paas Sequel,
- Meri Unsuni Kahani
- Milay Kuch Yun
- Mastana Mahi
- Millee Ali Ko Mili
- Noor Pur Ki Rani
- Vasal
- Sanjha
- Silvatein
- Meri Jaan
- Khamoshyaan.
- Teri Surat
- Tum Say Kaisay Kahoon
- Mujhey Sochta Koi Aur Hai
- Mohabbatain Chahatein
- Mann Mayal
- Aitraaz
- Anaa
- Woh Aik Pal
- Mohlat

== Awards and nominations ==
=== Awards ===
- Best Writer Most Challenging Subject Awards for Dastaan at 1st Hum Awards 2012 (won)
- Best Writer Drama Serial for Bari Aapa at 1st Hum Awards 2012 (nominated)

=== Lux Style Awards ===
Ceremony	Category	Project	Result
11th Lux Style Awards	Best Television Writer	Mera Naseeb	Won
11th Lux Style Awards	Best Television Writer	Mera Saaein	Nominated
14th Lux Style Awards	Best Television Writer	Chup Raho	Nominated
16th Lux Style Awards	Best Television Writer	Mann Mayal	Nominated
