= Nazo Dharejo =

Iron lady of Sindh, who fought for her land against 200 dacoits

Waderi Nazo Dharejo
- Born: Qazi AhmedSindh
- Occupation: Landlord Social work Politics
- Known for: Dare women which fought with Dacoits for her own land

Naz Mukhtiar Dharejo (Sindhi: نازُو ڌَاريجو, born 1976/1977), also known as Waderi Nazo Dharejo, is a Pakistani activist and politician. Her defense of her agricultural land against male relatives inspired her moniker "Pakistan's toughest woman" and also the 2017 film My Pure Land.

== Biography ==
Nazo Dharejo's father Haji Khuda Buksh Khan Dharejo was a landlord from a Zamindar family that owned agricultural land in Pakistan's Sindh Province. Nazo Dharejo is his oldest daughter with his second wife Waderi Jamzadi. She was born in a haveli in Qazi Ahmed.

Haji Khuda Baksh hired tutors for his daughters, so Nazo Dharejo learned Urdu and English in addition to Sindhi. She then earned her Bachelor of Arts in economics at Sindh University.

Haji Khuda Baksh taught his daughters as well as his son to use firearms in case they might need to defend the family's land. The father of Haji Khuda Baksh (Nazo Dharejo's grandfather) had four wives and several other sons. The grandfather's death created strong disputes about inheritance. After Nazo Dharejo's only brother was killed, and her father was jailed, some male relatives tried to take over the land where Nazo Dharejo was living with her mother and sisters. Instead of yielding the land, Nazo Dharejo with her sisters and her husband Zulfiqar Dharejo (they are first cousins) defended themselves by shooting at their attackers.

Then Nazo Dharejo's male relatives recruited 200 dacoits to attack the farm at night, in August 2005. Nazo Dharejo led the armed defense against them, firing her Kalashnikov rifle when they tried to approach the buildings. According to the Singapore Straits Times: "The gunfight which followed earned her the moniker 'Pakistan's toughest woman'". In legal battles that followed these armed attacks, Dharejo and her family won half a million rupees (S$6,459) in compensation.

Nazo Dharejo has been active in politics with the PML-N party under the name Mukhtiar Nazo Dharejo. In 2013, she was listed as one of the women on their reserved seats for Sindh.

== My Pure Land ==
After reading a 2012 newspaper article titled "Meet Nazo Dharejo: The toughest woman in Sindh," British-Pakistani filmmaker Sarmad Masud wanted to make a movie about her defense of her family's land. The movie was filmed in Urdu rather than Sindhi. Sindhi classical dancer Suhaee Abro played the lead role of Nazo Dharejo. Masud describes the film as "a modern-day feminist Western set in Pakistan, based on the extraordinary true story of one woman and her family who defended their home and land from 200 bandits."
