= Flock Edit =

British film editing company

- Company type: Private
- Industry: Film; Media; Advertising
- Founded: 2017
- Headquarters: London, United Kingdom
- Key people: Arlinda Craven; Olly Stothert; Matt Brady; Alexandra Wood
- Products: Post-production; Film editing Filmmaking; Film Consultants
- Website: www.flockedit.com

Flock Edit is a British independent out-of-house film editing company.

== History ==
Flock Edit was established in 2017.

Flock was founded by four London-based film editors as an independent editing company offering location-flexible post-production services. The company's model allowed film producers to conduct editing in location of their choice rather than at fixed in-house facilities. In addition to work in the advertising sector, Flock has contributed to film productions, including Dunkirk, Edie, and My Pure Land.

The company began sourcing new talent and has grown exponentially, its editors winning numerous awards and nominations across the media industry. One of its films being selected as the British entry for Best Foreign Language Film at the 90th Academy awards.

The company also services the charity, music and advertising industries. Notably brands such as Apple, BMW, Vodafone, Unilever, Spotify and Age UK.

== Previous film Projects ==
- Dunkirk
- Edie
- My Pure Land
- A Song Called Hate
- The Offering
- Unlucky Plaza
- Trafficker

== Previous advertisement projects ==
- Age UK
- Apple
- Audi
- Avon
- Bacardi
- BMW
- Ford
- Lexus
- Rimmel
- RSPCA
- Spotify
- Unilever
- Vodafone
- Yves Saint Laurent
