= Fun Khana =

- Genre: Sitcom
- Written by: Saqib Khan; Babar Jamal; Mansoor Saeed
- Creative director: Saqib Khan
- Starring: Hina Dilpazeer; Behroze Sabzwari; Uroosa Siddiqui; Firdous Jamal; Gohar Rasheed
- Opening theme: "Ye Ghar Fun Khana sa lagay dostoo"
- Country of origin: Pakistan
- Original language: Urdu
- No. of seasons: 1
- No. of episodes: 26

Production
- Producer: Momina Duraid
- Production locations: Karachi, Sindh, Pakistan
- Running time: 17–25 minutes

Original release
- Network: Hum TV
- Release: 27 January – 24 August 2012

Fun Khana is a Pakistani sitcom produced by Momina Duraid, directed by Saqib Khan, who also wrote it with Babar Jamal, and Mansoor Saeed. It was broadcast on Hum TV.

== Cast ==
- Hina Dilpazeer as Kausar (Head of the Ahmad family)
- Uroosa Siddiqui as Warda Ahmad
- Behroze Sabzwari as Qizalbash Ahmad
- Firdous Jamal as Rustam Ahmad
- Gohar Rasheed as Mustaqeem Ahmad

== See also ==
- Halka Na Lo
- Extras (The Mango People)
