= Jahez (TV series) =

Pakistani TV series

- Title card
- Genre: Family drama Social drama
- Written by: Amna Mufti
- Directed by: Babar Javed
- Starring: Hina Dilpazeer; Abid Ali; Faysal Qureshi; Beenish Chohan
- Country of origin: Pakistan
- Original language: Urdu
- No. of episodes: 22

Production
- Producer: A&B Entertainment
- Running time: Approx 40 Minutes

Original release
- Network: Geo TV
- Release: 9 February – 14 July 2012

Jahez (Urdu: جہیز, lit. 'Dowry') is a 2012 Pakistani social drama television serial directed by Babar Javed, written by Amna Mufti and produced by A&B Entertainment. The drama stars Hina Dilpazeer, Abid Ali and Faysal Qureshi in lead roles, and was first aired on 9 February 2012 on Geo Entertainment.

== Plot summary ==
The series focuses on the social issues surrounding the dowry system, with the main character endeavouring to give her son a great future despite the many hardships she faces. It centers on the life of a couple who manage the dowry for their daughters with the help of their son.

== Cast ==
- Hina Dilpazeer as Badar-un-Nisa "Baddo"
- Abid Ali as Baddo's husband
- Faysal Qureshi as Sheikhoo
- Jana Malik as Saira
- Uroosa Siddiqui as Sana
- Fizza Zehra as Hina
- Sadia Ghaffar as Nida
- Tehreem Zuberi as Afsheen
- Shahid Naqvi as Babu Bhai
- Hajra Khan as Roshaney
- Aamir Qureshi as Atif
- Noshaba Javed as Saira's Mother
- Shehzad Mukhtar Saira's Father
- Gul e Rana
- Beenish Chohan
- Afshan Qureshi

== Awards and nominations ==
Date of ceremony	Award	Category	Recipient(s) and nominee(s)	Result	Ref
February 18, 2013	Lux Style Awards	Best Television Actor – Satellite	Faysal Qureshi	Nominated	
February 18, 2013	Lux Style Awards	Best Television Writer	Amna Mufti	Nominated	
