= Tipu Sharif =

Pakistani actor and singer of Turkish and Pakistani descent

Syed Yörgüç Tipu Sharif
- Born: Istanbul, Turkey
- Education: Institute of Business Administration, Karachi
- Occupations: Actor; Singer
- Years active: 2007–present

Syed Yörgüç Tipu Sharif (Urdu: سیّد یورگُچ ٹیپو شریف), better known as Tipu Sharif (Urdu: ٹیپو شریف), is a Pakistani actor and singer-songwriter. His mother is from İzmir, Turkey, while his father is from Karachi, Pakistan.

== Career ==
Tipu has been active in the Pakistani television industry since 2005, and has acted in various drama serials, in which he has portrayed diverse characters. He made his film debut in 2015 with the biographical film Manto. He was also in a supporting role in the film Saawan (2016), which was directed by Farhan Alam.

Beyond acting, Tipu's debut album Ilham released in the summer of 2016. Before its release, Tipu released a music video for the single Lamhay from the album to positive reviews.

== Filmography ==
- Ballay Ki Bali (2011)
- Manto (2015)
- Saawan (2016)

=== Television ===
- Meri Behan Meri Dewrani
- Kahi Unkahi as Zeeshan
- Main Abdul Qadir Hoon as Pasha
- Tum Jo Miley as Jawad
- Man-o-Salwa as Sohail
- Hotel
- Ru Baru as Tipu
- Mere Meherbaan as Waleed
- 2015: Nikah as Nadeem
- Mohabbat Aag Si as Sharafat
- Anabiya as Munib
- Ghayal as Faiz
- Sang-e-Mar Mar as Saif Ur Rahman
- Izn-e-Rukhsat as Daniyal
- Pujaran
- Chanar Ghati as Sajid
- Naseebon Jali as Aslam
- Mohabbatain Chahatein
- Jab We Wed as Ranjha
- Baba Jani as Nasir
- Guddu as Zaheer
- Kaisi Teri Khudgarzi as Dara
- Bas Tera Saath Ho (2026)
- Humrahi

== Awards ==
- 14th PTV Awards - Best Actor - won
