= Imran Aslam (actor) =

Pakistani television and film actor

- ﻋﻤﺮﺍﻥ ﺍﺳﻠﻢ
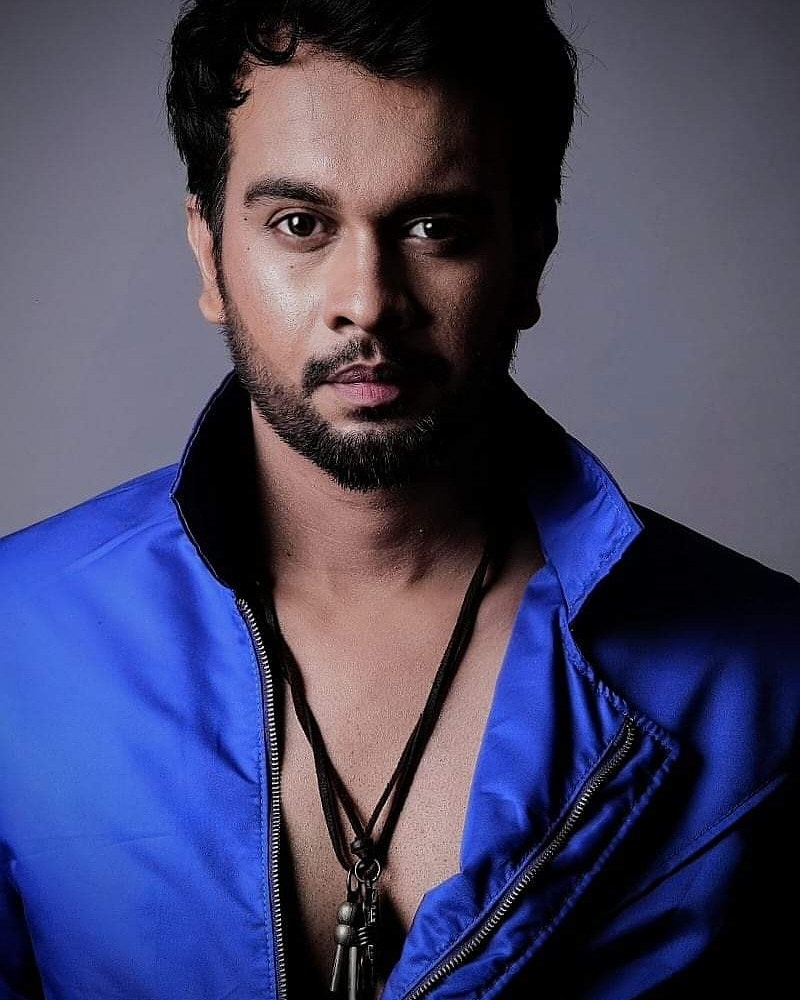
- Born: 8 July 1986 (age 39); Karachi, Pakistan
- Occupations: Actor; writer
- Years active: 2007–present
- Height: 6 ft 0 in (183 cm)
- Spouse: Sana Imran Aslam (m. 2011)
- Children: 2
- Awards: 1st Hum Awards – Best Actor Soap; 3rd Hum Awards – Best Actor Soap

Imran Aslam (Urdu: ﻋﻤﺮﺍﻥ ﺍﺳﻠﻢ) is a Pakistani television actor working in Pakistani television and film industry. Aslam has worked in numerous shows and won accolades for his performances including two Hum TV Awards. He was also nominated "Best Actor" in Lux Style Award for the drama series Sanjha.

== Filmography ==
=== Films ===
- Saawan (2016)

=== Shows ===
Show(s)	Role	Additional notes
H.I.T Hifazat Intelligence Team	Inspector Rana	Geo Entertainment
Sanjha	Murad / Weeda	Nominated 12th Lux Style Awards for Best Actor. Nominated 1st Hum Awards for Best Actor.
Mohabbat Jaye Bhar Mein	Naseer Anwar	Nominated 1st Hum Awards for Best Supporting Actor.
Jia Na Jaye	Sadiq	Nominated 2nd Hum Awards for Best Actor in Negative Role.
Nikhar Gaye Gulab Sare	Sikandar	Won 1st Hum Awards for Best Soap Actor.
Susraal Mera	Salman	Won 3rd Hum Awards for Best Soap Actor along Danish Taimoor (tie-up).
Akeli		Nominated 4th Hum Awards for Best Soap Actor.
Dareecha	Faizan	ARY Digital
Shehryar Shehzadi	Jibraan	Urdu 1 & Zee Zindagi
Kahi Unkahi	Shazeb	Hum TV
Kadurat	Asad	Hum TV
Mera Naseeb	Fahaad	Hum TV
Meenu Ka Susral	Saarim	ARY Digital
Susraal Meri Behan Ka	Wajid	Geo Entertainment
Dil-e-Barbaad	Faisal	ARY Digital
Marium Kaisay Jiye	Mohsin	ARY Digital
Kaala Jaadu	Irshad	ARY Digital
Mushrik	Rahul	Aaj Entertainment
Khuda Dekh Raha Hai	Adnan	A-Plus TV
Be Aib	Ahmed	Urdu 1
Mera Kya Qasoor Tha	Sheeraz	Geo Entertainment
Naik Parveen	Ruhaab	Geo Entertainment
Mein Mehru Hoon	Azhar	ARY Digital
Judai	Zaryaan	ARY Digital
Woh Chaar		Hum TV
Pehla Chand		Geo Entertainment
Ijazat		ARY Digital
Aross Paross		ARY Digital
Sapnon Ki Oat Main		
Rukhsaar	Zaheer	Geo Entertainment
Mera Naseeb	Fahad	Hum TV
Rishtay Kachay Dhagoon Se		A-Plus TV
Champa Aur Chambeli		Geo Entertainment
Love In Gulshan e Bihar	Babo	TV One Pakistan
Jallan		A-Plus TV
Nalaiq		Hum TV
Jeenay kay liye	Zaviyaar	Aaj Entertainment
Beti Jaisi	Sarim	Geo Entertainment
Meri Shadi Karwao	Ikhlaq	Play Entertainment
Bisaat e Dil	Mazhar	Hum TV
Jannat Chour De Meinay		SAB TV
Ajnabi Humsafar	Zain	SAB TV
Benaam	Babar	ARY Digital
Chahat Hui Tere Naam	Ashar	Geo Entertainment
Chhoti Chhoti Khushiyan	Nabeel	Geo Entertainment
Habs	Talal	ARY Digital
