= 12th Lux Style Awards =

Pakistani film awards ceremony

- Date: 18 February 2013– 20 February 2013
- Site: Expo Centre, Lahore
- Hosted by: Ahmed Ali Butt
- Produced by: Frieha Altaf
- Directed by: Frieha Altaf
- Organized by: Unilever Pakistan

Television coverage
- Network: ARY Digital

The 2013 Lux Style Awards, officially known as the 12th Lux Style Awards, honoured the best Pakistani films of 2012 and took place on 12 October 2013 at Expo Centre, Lahore.

During the ceremony, Lux Style Awards were awarded in 27 competitive categories.

== Background ==
The Lux Style Awards is an award ceremony held annually in Pakistan since 2002. The awards celebrate "style" in the Pakistani entertainment industry, and honour the country's best talents in film, television, music, and fashion. Around 30 awards are given annually.

== Winners and nominees ==
Winners are listed first and highlighted in boldface.

== Television ==
Best Television Serial – Terrestrial	Best Television Serial – Satellite
**Paayal (PTV)**; Qeemat (A Plus); Talafi (PTV); Mein (PTV); Mein Mohabbat aur Tum (A Plus)	**Humsafar (Hum TV)**; Man Jali (Geo TV); Mera Yaqeen (ARY Digital); Shehr-e-Zaat (Hum TV); Maat (Hum TV)
Best Television Actor – Satellite	Best Television Actress – Satellite
**Fawad Khan – Humsafar (Hum TV)**; Shahood Alvi – Mere Huzoor (Express Entertainment); Imran Aslam – Sanjha (Hum TV); Adnan Siddiqui – Mere Qatil Mere Dildar (Hum TV); Faisal Qureshi – Jahez (Geo TV)	**Mahira Khan – Humsafar (Hum TV)**; Mehwish Hayat – Mere Qatil Mere Dildar (Hum TV); Saba Hameed – Man Jali (Geo TV); Hina Dilpazeer – Quddusi Sahab Ki Bewa (ARY Digital); Saba Qamar – Maat (Hum TV)
Best Television Actor – Terrestrial	Best Television Actress – Terrestrial
**Noman Ejaz – Qeemat (A Plus)**; Babar Ali – Mein (PTV); Sami Khan – Mein (PTV); Kashif Mehmood – Love, Life Aur Lahore (A Plus); Saleem Sheikh – Anokha Ladla (PTV)	**Mahnoor Baloch – Talafi (PTV)**; Fiza Ali – Love, Life Aur Lahore (A Plus); Beenish Chohan – Chalo Phir Se Jee Kar Dekhain.(PTV); Mehwish Hayat – Mein (PTV); Resham – Ik Yaad Hay Baqi (A Plus)
Best Television Director	Best Television Writer
**Sarmad Khoosat –Humsafar (Hum TV)**; Amna Nawaz Khan – Maat (Hum TV); Kashif Nisar – Mein (PTV); Nadeem Beyg – Man Jali (Geo TV); Haissam Hussain – Durr-e-Shehwar (Hum TV)	**Khalil-ur-Rehman Qamar – Man Jali (Geo TV)**; Amna Mufti – Jahez (Geo TV); Umera Ahmad – Maat (Hum TV); Seema Munaf – Talafi (PTV); Faiza Iftikhar – Bilqees Kaur (Hum TV)
Best Television Track
**Ali Zafar – Zindagi Gulzar Hai (Hum TV)**; Qurat-ul-Ain Balouch – Roshan Sitara (Hum TV); Bilal Khan – Mata-e-Jaan Hai Tu (Hum TV); Abida Parveen – Shehr-e-Zaat (Hum TV); Zoe Viccaji – Tanhaiyan Naye Silsilay (ARY Digital)

== Music ==
Best Album	Best Music Video Director
**Khamoshi – Ayesha Omer**; Chahar Balish – Sajjad Ali; Circus in the Sky – Usman Riaz; Naubahar – Dynoman; The Harvest – Sajjad and Zain	**Farhad Humayun – Ankahi**; Hammad Khan – Ane De; Sohaib Akhtar – Khamoshi; Taimoor Salahuddin – Kahani Purani; Taimoor Salahuddin – Awam
Best Song of the Year	Best Emerging Talent in Music
**"Katna Nae" – by Sajjad Ali**; "Ankahi" – by Overload; "Pi Jaun" – by Farhan Saeed; "Jaag" – by Jarar Malik; "Kahani Puraani" – Mooroo	**Ahmed Sadiq**; Faris Shafi; Mooroo; Sibti; Naseer and Shahb

== Fashion ==
Best Model of the Year - Male	Best Model of the Year - Female
**Shahzad Noor**; Ather Amin; Abbas Jaffri; Waleed Khalid; Jahan-e-Khalid	**Mehreen Syed**; Cybil Choudhry; Amna Illyas; Ayyan; Rabia Butt
Best Achievement in Fashion Design - Luxury Prèt	Best Achievement in Fashion Design - Prèt
**Iman Ahmed of Body Focus**; Saniya Maskatiya; Shehla Chatoor; Maheen Karim; Khadija Shah	**Iman Ahmed of Body Focus**; Warda Saleem; Sanam Chaudhri; Sania Maskatiya; Feeha Jamshed
Best Achievement in Fashion Design - Lawn	Best Achievement in Fashion Design - Menswear
**Sana Safinaz**; Deepak Perwani for Orient; Kamal Lawn; Khaadi; Mahnoush	**Ammar Bilal**; Amir Adnan; Ahmaed Bham; Republic by Omer Farooq
Best Fashion Photographer	Best Hair and Makeup Artist
**Guddu Shani**; Ayaz Sani; fayyaz Amed; Nadir Feroz Khan; Rizwan Ul Haq	**Creative Team at Nabila**; Tariq Amin; Maram Azmat; Rana Khan; Shammal Qureishi; Aabroo Hashimi
Best High Street Brand	Best Emerging Talent in Fashion
**Khaadi**; Ggulabo; Daaman; Rang Ja; The Working Woman	**Saima Azhar**; Misha Lakhani; Sana Sarfaraz; Natasha's Salon; Abdullah Haris

== Special awards ==
- Best Dressed Celebrity (Female): **Aamina Sheikh**
- Best Dressed Celebrity (Male): Ali Zeeshan
