= Saawan =

Pakistani movie (2017)

- ساون
- Directed by: Farhan Alam
- Written by: Mashood Qadri
- Produced by: Mashood Qadri; Asma Qadri
- Starring: Saleem Mairaj; Tipu Sharif; Imran Aslam; Syed Karam Abbas; Arif Bahalim; Najiba Faiz
- Cinematography: Farhan Alam
- Edited by: Aseem Sinha
- Music by: Emir Işılay
- Production company: Kalakar Films
- Distributed by: Geo Films
- Release dates: 8 July 2017 (Madrid); 15 September 2017 (Pakistan)
- Running time: 137 minutes
- Country: Pakistan
- Language: Urdu

Saawan (Urdu: ساون) is a 2017 Pakistani drama film directed by Farhan Alam and produced and written by Mashood Qadri under the production banner of Kalakar Entertainments. The film is based on a true story of a disabled child, who faced difficulties in the deserts of Pakistan. The film stars Saleem Mairaj, Syed Karam Abbas, Arif Bahalim, Najiba Faiz and Imran Aslam in the lead roles. The other cast includes Tipu Sharif, Hafeez Ali, Sehrish Qadri, Sohail Malik, Shahid Niazmi, Muhammad Abbas, Danial Yunus, Mehek Zulfiqar and Syed Muhammad Ali. A special appearance is made by Lt. Gen. S. A. A. Najmi (R).

Saawan won the Best Film award at four international festivals, the Social World Film Festival, the Salento International Film Festival, the Madrid International Film Festival where it won Best Foreign Language Feature Film and the Alexandria Film Festival where it won Best Foreign Film. It was selected as the Pakistani entry for the Best Foreign Language Film at the 90th Academy Awards, but it was not nominated. Following its successful international festival run, Saawan was officially released in cinemas across Pakistan on Friday, 15 September 2017 under the banner of Geo Films.

== Plot ==
The film tells the story of a disabled child, who is up against all kinds of obstacles and cruelty.

== Cast ==
- Saleem Mairaj as Child abductor
- Syed Karam Abbas as Sawan
- Arif Bahalim as Jishar
- Najiba Faiz as Arzoo
- Imran Aslam as News reporter
- Tipu Sharif
- Hafeez Ali
- Sehrish Qadri as Sana
- Sohail Malik as Sardar Ghazwaan
- Shahid Niazmi as Zakir
- Muhammad Abbas as Rehmat
- Danial Yunus as Mirzaad
- Mehek Zulfiqar
- Syed Muhammad Ali as Humbal
- Lt. Gen. S. A. A. Najmi (R)
- Liam as Tripod dog

== Production ==
The official trailer of the film was released in early March 2016. The film was shot in Pakistan's Northern region (Gilgit-Baltistan and Shigar) and the Balochistan province (Quetta district and Ziarat district).

== Release ==
The film was scheduled for release in 2017 in Pakistan as well as United Arab Emirates, United States, United Kingdom and India under the production banner of Kalakar Films. Rehmat K Fazli, the head of Geo Films in an Interview confirmed that film will release in late September 2017.

=== Home media ===
Saawan was made available for streaming on Netflix.

== Reception ==
=== Critical reception ===
The Express Tribune rated the film 2/5, calling it an "ambitious mess that falls face first." The review criticised the poorly-structured screenplay and the cluttering of themes, stating that "in cluttering up the story with so many themes and redundant subplots, Qadri distracts from the main story of Saawan and dilutes its intensity." However, it praised Syed Karam Abbas as "probably the only child actor in Pakistan who I believe can give most mainstream TV and film stars a run for their money," and Najiba Faiz as "brilliant." A separate review for the same publication declared that the film "lacks entertainment, execution and presentation," predicting it would fail at the box office.

Dawn noted that the film "has great potential but far greater problems," observing that "the screenplay by Mashood Qadri moves back and forth in time while including related events into the main plot" and that "by the halfway mark, the story of the boy's resilience becomes a nearly forgotten priority." The review praised Farhan Alam's cinematography, writing that he "captures unending vistas of cascading mountaintops" and that "his actors do the rest, ranging from good to nearly great."

The News International (Instep) commended the film for "presenting compelling issues that are extinct in most parts of the world but continue to persist in this particular country." The review praised the performances of Karam Abbas and Najiba Faiz, but noted that "the one drawback is the film's length and at more than 137 minutes, it needed crisper editing." A separate review for the same publication called it a film that "merits applause" for portraying the harsh reality of children with special needs "with immediacy" and without manipulating emotions.

Youlin Magazine wrote that "what the film lacked in story, dialogue and production value, it made up for in cinematography and art direction," praising shots such as "the aerial view of the landscape, silhouetted figures against a setting sun." The review concluded that "Saawan had potential, but it seems to have been lost somewhere in its genre-jumping, tragedy-documenting, futile theatrics."

MAG The Weekly praised the film's "solid performances" while noting that "had Saawan been 30 minutes short, it would have appealed to the cinema going audience who seem to be more interested in commercial flicks."

== Accolades ==
Year	Award / Film Festival	Category	Recipient(s)	Result	Ref.
2017	Madrid International Film Festival	Best Foreign Language Feature Film	Saawan	Won	
2017	Social World Film Festival	Best Film	Saawan	Won	
2017	Social World Film Festival	Best Director	Farhan Alam	Won	
2017	Salento International Film Festival	Best Film	Saawan	Won	
2017	Salento International Film Festival	Best Musical Score	Saawan	Won	
2017	Alexandria Film Festival	Best Foreign Film	Saawan	Won	
2017	Pakistan International Film Festival	Best Director	Farhan Alam	Nominated	
2017	Pakistan International Film Festival	Best Male Debut	Syed Karam Abbas	Nominated	
2017	90th Academy Awards	Best Foreign Language Film	Saawan	Submitted	
2018	4th Galaxy Lollywood Awards	Best Film	Saawan	Nominated	
2018	4th Galaxy Lollywood Awards	Best Director	Farhan Alam	Nominated	
2018	4th Galaxy Lollywood Awards	Best Story	Mashood Qadri	Nominated	
2018	4th Galaxy Lollywood Awards	Best Actor in a Negative Role	Saleem Mairaj	Nominated	

== See also ==
- List of Pakistani films of 2017
- List of submissions to the 90th Academy Awards for Best Foreign Language Film
- List of Pakistani submissions for the Academy Award for Best International Feature Film
