= Edie (film) =

- Film poster
- Directed by: Simon Hunter
- Written by: Elizabeth O'Halloran
- Produced by: Mark Stothert; Tim Dennison; Edward Little
- Starring: Sheila Hancock; Kevin Guthrie; Paul Brannigan; Amy Manson; Wendy Morgan
- Cinematography: August Jakobsson
- Edited by: Olly Stothert
- Music by: Debbie Wiseman
- Production company: Cape Wrath Films
- Distributed by: Arrow Films (UK)
- Release dates: 26 June 2017 (Edinburgh International Film Festival); 25 May 2018
- Running time: 102 minutes
- Country: United Kingdom
- Language: English
- Box office: $2.9 million

Edie is a 2017 British drama film directed by Simon Hunter and written by Elizabeth O'Halloran. The film stars Sheila Hancock, Kevin Guthrie and Paul Brannigan. The soundtrack was written by Debbie Wiseman. Principal photography began in the Scottish Highlands in 2016.

== Plot ==
Edith Moore (Edie) is a bitter, gruff woman in her eighties. In the months following her husband George's death, Edie's strained relationship with her daughter Nancy begins to worsen. The question over Edie's future looms large; while Edie tries hard to convince Nancy she can manage fine by herself, Nancy is making plans for her mother to move to a retirement home. Edie feels like it is the beginning of the end. It seems she will die with all the regrets of her past intact and one regret haunts her most of all. When Edie was married, her father planned a hiking trip for them to climb Suilven in the Scottish Highlands. Edie yearned to go, but her husband George, an abusive and controlling man, made her stay at home. Nearly thirty years later, Edie decides to make the trip herself alone.

== Cast ==
- Sheila Hancock as Edie
- Kevin Guthrie as Jonny
- Paul Brannigan as McLaughlin
- Amy Manson as Fiona
- Wendy Morgan as Nancy

== Production ==
Principal photography on the film began in May 2016. The primary filming location was the village of Lochinver and the mountain Suilven in the Northern Scottish Highlands. Sheila Hancock completed the trek up the mountain herself, and claims to have been the oldest person to do so. The film was completed in March 2017.

== Reception ==
The film received a good audience reception on release. On review aggregator Rotten Tomatoes, the film holds an approval rating of 62% based on 42 reviews, with an average rating of 6.07/10.
