= Attiya Dawood =

Sindhi poet, writer, feminist and activist (born 1958)

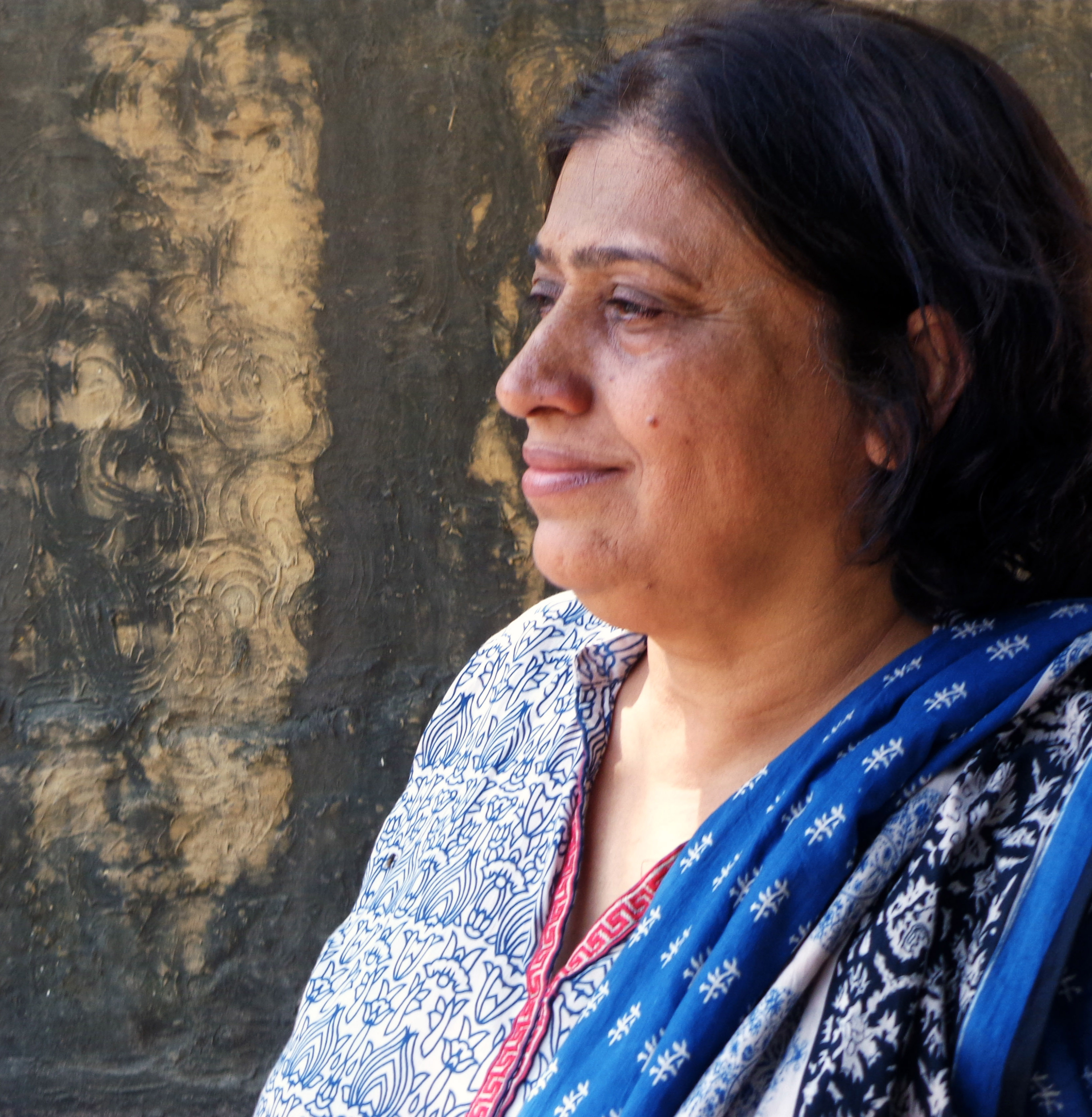
- Dawood in 2012
- Native name: عطیہ داؤد
- Born: Attiya Dawood Larik; April 1, 1958 (age 68) Moledino Larik, Naushahro Feroze, Sindh, Pakistan
- Occupation: Poet, writer, feminist, activist
- Subject: Women's rights
- Years active: 1980–present
- Children: 2, including Suhaee Abro

Attiya Dawood (Urdu: عطیہ داؤد; born April 1, 1958) is a Sindhi poet, writer, feminist and activist. She has been hailed as one of the most important feminist Sindhi writers of her time. Attiya uses her poetry to highlight the oppression of women in Sindhi society in the name of tradition. She has been writing poetry since 1980.

== Personal life ==
=== Early life ===
Attiya Dawood Larik was born in Moledino Larik, a small village in Naushero Feroze District, Sindh. Her mother, Arbab Khatoon, was the third wife of her father, Muhammad Dawood Larik. Muhammad was a Hafiz and a poet who ran away from home to become a schoolteacher. He died in 1964, when Attiya was 6 years old. In 1975, Attiya's family moved to Karachi, where she took admission in a college. During this time, she struggled both socially and financially, and worked in a towel factory to bear her school expenses. She started writing poetry when she was introduced to Ahmed Saleem by her friend Rupa. From there, she became a member of Sindhi Adabi Sangat. She has written poetry regularly since the 1980s.

Attiya published her first poem in a Sindhi-language newspaper when she was in 8th grade, under the name Attiya Larik. Her brothers became angry with her for the publication, and in response she decided to only use her father's name, Dawood, for future publications.

=== Education ===
Attiya holds an M.A in Sindhi Literature.

=== Marriage ===
Attiya Dawood is married to Khuda Baksh Abro, a well known artist and designer who graduated from National College of Arts, Lahore. She has two daughters with him.

== Career ==
Attiya began her career as a writer and poet in the 1980s. She has been a regular contributor to Hilal e Pakistan and its women pages Sartiyun. She has also contributed to workshops and seminars by writing papers on subjects such as folk artists and men of letters in Sindhi language. She has published six books, and her articles on women's rights, peace, justice, and gender issues have appeared in major national dailies and literary journals. She has also been comparing in radio programs on women and their problems.

=== Writing ===
Attiya's poetry career began in the 1980s, when she started contributing to a local magazine. In 1995, Attiya published her first collection of poetry, Raging to be free, which contained English translations of her works in Sindhi.

She draws inspiration from her traumatic girlhood experiences in rural Sindh. Both her 1995 poetry collection Raging to be free and her 2002 book Sindh ki Aurat discuss the struggles of women through the lens of Attiya's experiences.

In 2000, Attiya wrote an autobiography during a three-month residency at the Sanskriti Kendra in New Delhi. It was published in Urdu in 2009 as Ainay Kay Saamnay (lit. 'Before the Looking Glass'). It was earlier published in Hindi in India by the same title by Rajkamal Prakashan. In Ainay kay Saamnay, Attiya narrates her early life in the rural Sindh, her frustrations over the patriarchal society and culture as a young girl. In 2012, Oxford University Press published an English translation by Amina Azfar under the title Images in My Mirror.

Her 2019 book, Sindhi Adab, is a book about the history of Sindhi literature. It covers the Soomra period literature and its poets such as Jam Lakho and Mehar Rai.

Attiya's poetry is noted for its sincerity, zeal and the feminism touch it contains. Through her poetry and writings, she speaks about Women's rights.

=== Activism ===
Attiya Dawood is known as a feminist writer and poet. Her poetry and writings challenge the society and contains verses that support her opinions on women and their rights. In a literary sitting in Larkana, Attiya said: “I am proud to be a feminist poet but I am afraid male-dominated society interprets it wrongly.” She mentioned that male critics often found negativity in her work but the criticism will not stop her from her objectives.

Attiya participated in the NGO segment of a Conference in Beijing, as one of the representatives of ASR Resource Centre, a Lahore-based NGO. The NGOs consisted of 130 workshops, each one on a separate topic.

== Selected works ==
Attiya Dawood has published regularly since the 1990s. She writes mostly in Sindhi. Her poems have been translated into German by Annemarrie Schimmel who is known for her works in Sufism and Islam. Her works have also been translated in English and Urdu. Two of her poems have appeared in Jane Goodwin's "The Price of Honor".

Works
Year	Title	Publisher	ISBN	Notes
1995	Raging to be Free	Maktab-e-Danyal, Karachi		English translation by Asif Farrukhi
1997	Sharafat Jee Pulsarat	Suhaee Books		Sharafat Ka Pul-e-Sarat - Urdu translation by Fahmida Riaz
	Aap ka jism aur sehat	Wada Kitab Ghar		
2001	Sindhi aurat kee kahani	Seen Publishers		
2002	Sindh ki aurat: sapney sai such tak	Shehrazad		lit. 'Sindhi Woman: From Dream to Truth'
2002	Un poori chadar	Koonj Publications		
2009	Ainay kay Saamnay	Oxford University Press	978-0-19-547571-5	Autobiography
2019	Sindhi Adab: aik mukhtasar tareekh	Oxford University		History

Poetry (selected works)
Title	Urdu	German	English
Sharafat Jee Pulsarat	Sharafat Ka Pul-e-Sarat	Der schmale Steg der Ehre	
Amar Geet	Amar Geet		A Song Everlasting
Safar		Die Reise	
Be-rang Tasveer		Farbloses Bild	
Preet Ji Reet		Geschichte der Liebe	

== Awards ==
Awards
Year	Title	By	Notes
2001	Sindhi Adeeb Award	Akhil Bharat Sindhi Boli and Sahit Sabha, India	Two literary sittings conducted in her honor at the Sahitya Academy, Bhopal, November 2001
