= Sanjha =

Pakistani drama series (2011–2012)

- Title screen
- Genre: Drama; Social
- Written by: Samira Fazal
- Directed by: Farooq Rind
- Starring: Suhaee Abro; Sabreen Hisbani; Imran Aslam; Noman Ijaz; Fahad Mustafa
- Theme music composer: Waqar Ali
- Opening theme: Song written by Ayyub Khawar performed by Sanam Marvi
- Composer: Bilal Allah-Datta
- Country of origin: Pakistan
- Original language: Urdu
- No. of episodes: 24

Production
- Executive producer: Farooq Rind
- Editors: Shiraz Fayaz; Rao Rizwan; Adeel
- Running time: ~40 minutes per episode

Original release
- Network: Hum TV
- Release: 17 November 2011 – 26 April 2012

Sanjha (Sindhi: سنجھا, lit. 'The Sunset'; Urdu: سنجھا) is an Urdu-language Pakistani drama series that aired on Hum TV from November 2011 to April 2012. Written by Samira Fazal and directed Farooq Rind, the series focused on human trafficking. The series starred Suhaee Abro in the title role of Sanjha, a woman who comes to the Karachi city from the Thar Desert and is forced to work in a brothel; the kotha.

== Plot summary ==
Sanjha is a poor girl from the Thar Desert in the Sindh province of Pakistan. Bakshu, the husband of Sanjha's sister Sarah, sells Sanjha to brothel owner Mumtaz, and tells Sarah, that he has sent Sanjha away to the city to earn a living. At first, Sanjha believes she has been hired as a maid. At the brothel, Sanjha is renamed Reshmi and meets Waheed, "Weeda" Murad, who lives at the brothel with his mother and brother and has a passion for art.

Sarah asks Shabana and her son, Dr. Ammar, for assistance finding Sanjha. Mumtaz allows Shabana, who is writing a book on courtesans, to visit the brothel on the condition that she will not take photos or ask the women about their lives before the brothel. Meanwhile, Weeda and Sanjha begin to fall in love.

Mooda, a human trafficker, wants to sell Sanjha, but Mumtaz opposes the plan. Mooda sends his men to take Sanjha, but they take another prostitute, Rosie, instead. Mooda brutally murders Rosie.

Mumtaz holds an event at which Sanjha performs. Impressed by her dancing and innocence, Seth Sugarwala decides that he wants to purchase Sanjha. Ammar had planned to raid the event but was betrayed by Weeda, who informed Mumtaz of the plan in a fit of jealousy. Ammar and Weeda argue because they are both in love with Sanjha, but Murad forgives Ammar because Ammar had helped his mother when she was sick. Weeda threatens to kill Mumtaz if she doesn't release Sanjha, so Mumtaz sells Sanjha to Sugarwala.

Sarah, convinced that her sister will never return, commits suicide. Weeda is also heartbroken over Sanjha's fate. Weeda's friend Narmeen convinces Murad show his painting at an exhibition, which leads a man at the show to offer Weeda a job as a professional artist.

The man who hired Weeda turns out to be Hukum. Sanjha meets Weeda, and angrily confronts him. Hukum's aide Laeeq tries to defend Weeda, but she turns on him. Meanwhile, Weeda's lover tells Weeda that she wants to marry him, but Weeda says he does not love her. With the help of Laeeq, Weeda sends his lover a letter about his dark past, ending the relationship. Hukum learns of Weeda and Sanjha's former relationship and confronts Sanjha, who says that she do not love him. To make Weeda jealous, Sanjha asks Hukum to marry her. Eventually, Hukum makes her realise her love for Weeda, and Weeda's love for her. Sanjha is set free and runs to find Weeda. She hugs Weeda and ask him for forgiveness.

== Cast ==
- Imran Aslam as Waheed Murad a.k.a. Weeda
- Suhaee Abro as Sanjha a.k.a. Reshmi
- Fahad Mustafa as Dr. Ammar; Shabana's son
- Naila Jaffri as Shabana; Ammar's mother
- Sabreen Hisbani as Sarah a.k.a. Addi (Dead)
- Seemi Pasha as Shabo (Dead); Weeda and Deema's mother
- Malik Raza as Laeeq
- Shazia Afgan as Rosie (Dead)
- Salma Zafar as Shasta
- Resham as Mumtaz
- Noman Ijaz as Hukum
- Rehan Sheikh as Bakshu; Sara's husband
- Eshita Mehboob as Narmeen
- Ayeshah Alam as Fehmeeda; Hukum's wife
- Ayesha Toor as Aneeta
- Rashid Farooqui as Mehmood a.k.a. Muda
- Yasir Shooro as Badal
- Zuhab Khan as Deema
- Humaira Zaheer as Murad's mother
- Maan Alina

== Production ==
According to Abro, the character was especially written for her after her photographs in Thar costumes inspired the producer Momina Duraid.

== Reception ==
In a year-ender article for the Newsline, author Amna R. Ali included the serial in her list of the best of 2011, stating that its beauty lies "in its inclusion of original locales and socially relevant themes reminiscent".

In a review of the serial after its conclusion, a reviewer Mag The Weekly praised the serial for its strong performances, particularly by Suhaee Abro, Imran Aslam, Noman Ejaz, and Resham, but criticised for its slow pace, weak storyline, and further noticed the lack of promotions that led to a decline in audience interest in the halfway.

=== Awards and nominations ===
- Hum Awards - Best Director Drama Serial - Farooq Rind - Won
- Hum Awards - Best Television Sensation Female - Suhaee Abro - Won
- Lux Style Awards - Best Television Actor - Imran Aslam
