= Kahi Unkahi =

- Written by: Nadia Akhtar
- Directed by: Asim Ali
- Starring: Ayeza Khan; Sheheryar Munawar; Urwa Hocane (For entire cast see below)
- Opening theme: Kahi Unkahi
- Country of origin: Pakistan
- Original language: Urdu
- No. of episodes: 23

Production
- Running time: Approx. 40 mins

Original release
- Network: Hum TV
- Release: 6 November 2012 – 9 April 2013

Kahi Unkahi (Urdu: کہی ان کہی) (transl. what is said and unsaid) is a 2012 Pakistani telenovela broadcast on Hum TV. The first of the 23 episodes aired on 6 November 2012, and was broadcast every Tuesday. Written by Nadia Akhtar and directed by Asim Ali, Kahi Unkahi starred Ayeza Khan, Shehryar Munawar Siddiqui and Urwa Hocane in the lead roles. The last episode aired on 9 April 2013.

Kahi Unkahi was also broadcast in India, where it premiered on the channel Zindagi on 13 August 2014. The show premiered on 26 December 2019 on Hum Europe.

== Plot ==
Kamaal Nizami is a haughty and arrogant wealthy businessman who believes that relations should be made in equal class only. His wife Saira has an opposite opinion from him, as she thinks that all humans are equal and hence everyone should be treated equally. Their elder son Ansar is much like his father in beliefs and mannerisms but the younger son, Sherry, is quite close to his mother and often indulges in playing with the kids of the household servants, thinking that all kids are like him. He befriends Zoya, who happens to be the only daughter of their driver Bashir Ahmed and affectionately refers to her as ‘Zoyi’. This fact is not looked upon favourably by Kamaal, as he wants Sherry to make friends among the elite and renowned families.

Zoya, though coming from a low-income background, is a diligent, friendly girl who wins Saira's heart with her dedication towards academics and to support her, Saira gets Zoya admitted to Sherry and Ansar's school, where most of the children belong to rich families. No matter how much Kamaal feels furious, this doesn’t stop Sherry from playing with Zoya and even exchanging his lunchbox with her.

Parvez and his wife Nyla, family friends and business partners of Kamaal, find Saira's decision of having admitted Zoya to their children's high-class school insulting. Anam, their daughter, is jealous of Zoya and as Zoya excels in academics and wins the Student of the Year trophy, Anam's jealousy worsens.

Things take a turn at Sherry's birthday party, where Zoya is humiliated by Anam and Zeeshan, her brother, as they call her a ‘servant’s kid’ and comment that she is not worthy of attending such parties of wealthy families. Parvez and Nyla support their children saying that Kamaal and Saira should not have invited Zoya to the party, even if Sherry likes spending time with her. This incident takes a toll on Kamaal's mind, and as a result, he decides to send Sherry abroad to boarding school so that he can be away from Zoya and develop some upper-class mannerisms.

A few years later, a grown-up Sherry returns for his brother's wedding. Kamaal informs Bashir about Sherry's return, stating that he should refrain from sending Zoya to their house till Ansar is married. Unknown to the family, Ansar has been harassing Zoya. He often invades her personal space, holds her hand when alone or stops her way, which makes her fear and dislike him.

One night, Sherry happens to meet Zoya when they’re in the garden and collide with each other. He holds her to stop her from falling but Kamaal witnesses this and misunderstands. He gets agitated, confronting Sherry about the incident. Though Sherry assures him that he has nothing to do with Zoya and that they accidentally came across each other, he can’t stop thinking about her.

On the other hand, a grown-up Anam is still arrogant and spoilt. She is interning in Kamaal's office and he is very fond of her. She instantly likes Sherry when she sees his photo and quickly befriends him when he comes to Kamaal's office. Sherry has mostly forgotten his childhood in Pakistan and has only vague memories of his time with Zoya. But he is slowly recollecting and is drawn to Zoya.

Zoya's college friend Aiman's brother Shahzeb shows interest in marrying Zoya due to her kind nature, and he even invites her through Aiman to their place for dinner. Anam, too, is invited there and is shocked to realise that Zoya is the same girl for whom Shahzeb rejected her. She then indirectly insults Zoya by asking her about her family background in front of everyone, and on knowing about her father being a driver, Shahzeb's mother refuses to allow Zoya from becoming Shahzeb's wife but Shahzeb is unaffected by this revelation and is still interested in marrying Zoya.

During Ansar's functions, Anam leaves no chance to humiliate or insult Zoya, which makes Sherry feel sorry for her. Ansar marries Mariam, following which Anam persuades Sherry to believe that he is in love with her, and thus, being confused about his feelings, he proposes to her. Anam declares this proposal to her parents, compelling them to go to Kamaal's place and discuss their wedding.

However, seeing Anam in such a hurry and her behaviour towards the poor, helpless and needy people, Sherry is forced to rethink his relationship with her. He develops a soft corner for Zoya by learning about her friendly and helping nature. He invites her to his birthday party, thrown by Anam. Seeing Zoya with him at the party, Anam blasts out at her angrily, which makes Sherry defend her, admitting that Zoya is a good friend to him and since the birthday party is for him, it is his right to invite all his close friends. Zeeshan misbehaves with Zoya at the party. Sherry comes to her rescue leading to a fight between both the guys, seeing which Zoya gets tensed, but this makes Anam sadistically happy.

On the other hand, Saira and Mariam are taken aback by Sherry's proposal to Anam, as they assume that he never showed any interest in her and Mariam even senses that he loves Zoya but remains silent. She discusses this matter with Ansar, who warns her not to speak anything in front of Kamaal. Saira dislikes Anam because of her arrogance and attitude but doesn’t dare to say anything in front of her husband.

Kamaal is elated that Sherry has proposed to Anam and starts the preparations for their engagement. But on the evening of their engagement, Sherry refuses to get engaged to Anam, saying that he was too confused while making a decision, which shocks everyone. He wastes no time in proposing to Zoya, who says that she would need some time to think about it.

A disheartened Anam and Kamaal decide to create differences between Sherry and Zoya. Anam calls Zoya at Shahzeb's place through Ayeza, her best friend and Shahzeb's younger sister, saying that he is not feeling well and no one is at home to look after him. The next moment, she calls Sherry, saying that Zoya is having an affair with Shahzeb without anyone's knowledge. This evil plan works, and Sherry is heartbroken to see Zoya with Shahzeb alone at his home.

After seeing his daughter being humiliated by Kamaal in front of everyone, Bashir decides to leave for his village. Anam tries to talk to Sherry, but heartbroken by Zoya's betrayal, he doesn’t want to talk to anyone. Her anger deepens so much that she faces an accident by rash driving. Shahzeb learns about Anam's plan through Ayeza and even scolds her for being a part of this disgusting plan. He calls Sherry to tell him everything, but all his efforts go in vain as Sherry doesn't believe him.

On the other hand, Ansar confesses to Mariam that he has been having an affair with his secretary Seema (Nida Khan), sensing that she would disclose this to his wife if he didn’t marry her. He assumes that Mariam would be mad at him and tell everything to Saira and Kamaal, but to his surprise, she visits Seema's place and talks to her peacefully, apologising for whatever Ansar did with her. This incident brings a change in Ansar, and he apologises to Mariam.

Realising his wrongdoings towards Sherry and Zoya, he decides to tell the truth to Sherry, who has finally decided to leave Pakistan forever to settle in London against his parents' wishes. On reaching the airport, Ansar discloses the truth to his brother, which disappoints Sherry. He returns to confront his father at his office and then at Parvez's home to talk to Anam about her disgusting plan, which heightens her anger, and she goes into a state of depression. Kamaal is astonished to learn that Sherry is heading off to Zoya's village to apologise and marry her. After an argument with his father, he leaves the home, much to Saira's sadness.

Zeeshan is enraged to see his sister in depression and sets out to find Sherry. Mariam is delighted to learn about her pregnancy and waits for Ansar to come home so that she would give this news to him face-to-face. Zeeshan comes to Kamaal's home and finds Ansar stepping out of his car. He demands Sherry apologise to Anam, but Ansar suggests he solve the matter peacefully rather than arguing unnecessarily. Enraged, Zeeshan shoots Ansar to death. He is shocked at his action.

Kamaal and his family are heartbroken after Ansar's death. Sherry, unaware of his brother's death, reaches Zoya's place to apologise to Bashir and her. He is shocked that Bashir has fixed Zoya's marriage with her paternal cousin Liyaqat, a typical chauvinist.

Zeeshan is arrested by the police, after which Parvez suffers a heart attack and gets admitted to the hospital. Kamaal and Saira miss Sherry even more after Ansar's death. On the other hand, Liyaqat learns about Sherry's feelings for Zoya and Bashir about his daughter's feelings for Sherry. Liyaqat confronts Sherry angrily, after which the entire matter comes to the villagers. Hence the final decision is left to be taken by the Panchayat. After listening to Sherry's innocent wish to marry Zoya, the Panchayat asks him to bring his parents to the village within seven days to ask her hand in marriage, or else she will be married off to Liyaqat.

With the hope of taking help from Ansar and Mariam, Sherry reaches his home, only to find his deeply broken parents who inform him about Ansar's death, hearing that he is too shocked to say anything. He talks to Mariam, offering condolences to her and telling her about whatever happened in Zoya's village. Seeing his son and daughter-in-law being helpful towards each other, Kamaal decides to get Mariam married to Sherry so that Ansar's child would remain in their family.

Anam is distressed to see her father in critical condition and her brother behind bars. Nyla blames her for all this mess, in reply to which Anam retorts that her arrogance and attitude are because of her upbringing. Nyla realises her mistake. Anam meets Zeeshan in jail, where he asks her to talk to Kamaal for his bail as he will agree to her plea since he likes her. He confesses that he didn’t mean to shoot Ansar and that whatever happened was an accident.

When Sherry comes to his father to talk about Zoya, before even listening to him, Kamaal pleads with him to marry Mariam for the sake of Ansar's child. Seeing him helpless and asking his son for something with much pleading, Sherry unwillingly agrees to his wish. Upon knowing this, Mariam is astonished since she knows Sherry loves Zoya and asks Kamaal to get them married instead of forcing Sherry into a relationship where neither he nor Mariam would remain happy. She further says that she has always looked at Sherry as a little brother, and she would be like a daughter to Kamaal and Saira, thus living with them forever with Ansar's child.

On the other hand, a dejected Anam sadly pleads to a road beggar to pray for all her problems to be solved soon since she has heard that God listens to the prayers of the needy and helpless. The beggar replies that the Almighty listens to everyone's prayers if we pray with a pure heart. It makes Anam realise her impolite behaviour towards such helpless and needy people.

Saira senses that Sherry is not happy with the idea of marrying Mariam, and she tries to talk to him when Kamaal comes to them and surprises them by agreeing to get Sherry and Zoya married. A delighted Sherry then heads off to Zoya's village along with his family, and receiving this news, both Bashir and Zoya are elated.

A week later, Zoya is serving tea to everyone as Kamaal praises her hand-made tea. Just then, Nyla and Anam reach there, pleading with Kamaal to forgive Zeeshan. Kamaal gives Mariam the right to decide since she is Ansar's wife. She is about to leave from there when Zoya stops her and says that one can never bring back the dead and forgiving someone is the greatest gift anyone can give. Mariam agrees to get Zeeshan out of jail. Upon hearing this, Anam apologises to Zoya and Sherry for her rude behaviour towards both, especially Zoya.

Sherry feels happy to have a life partner like her, while Kamaal is proud of Zoya as he hugs her lovingly, and the show ends on a happy note.

== Cast ==
- Ayeza Khan as Zoya
- Sheheryar Munawar as Sheheryar a.k.a. Sherry
- Urwa Hocane as Anam
- Usman Peerzada as Kamal
- Irsa Ghazal as Saira
- Hasan Ahmed as Ansar
- Zhalay Sarhadi as Mariam
- Khalid Anam as Parvez
- Imran Aslam as Shahzeb
- Seemi Pasha as Parvez's wife
- Tipu Sharif as Zeeshan
- Mansoor Sikandar
- Rashid Mehmood as Bashir
- Hina Javed as Zoya's college friend
