= My Pure Land =

2017 film

- Film poster
- Directed by: Sarmad Masud
- Written by: Sarmad Masud
- Produced by: Bill Kenwright
- Starring: Suhaee Abro; Salman Ahmed Khan; Razia Malik; Tayyab Ifzal; Eman Fatima
- Cinematography: Haider Zafar
- Edited by: Olly Stothert
- Music by: Tristan Cassel-Delavois
- Distributed by: Bill Kenwright Films
- Release dates: 24 June 2017 (EIFF); 15 September 2017 (UK)
- Running time: 92 minutes
- Country: United Kingdom
- Language: Urdu
- Box office: $17,157

My Pure Land is a 2017 Urdu-language British drama film directed by British Pakistani filmmaker Sarmad Masud. It was selected as the British entry for the Best Foreign Language Film at the 90th Academy Awards, but it was not nominated. It was the first time the United Kingdom had submitted an Urdu-language film.

== Inspiration ==
British-Pakistani filmmaker Sarmad (Sam) Masud, born in Bradford to immigrant parents, based the film on the life of Nazo Dharejo, after reading a 2012 story in The Express Tribune that called her "the toughest woman in Sindh." Masud describes the film as "a modern-day feminist Western set in Pakistan, based on the extraordinary true story of one woman and her family who defended their home and land from 200 bandits."

== Plot ==
Nazo Dharejo lives on a farm in rural Sindh, with her parents, two sisters, and an older brother. Early in the film, her father encourages his daughters as well as his son to value the land and be prepared to defend it: ""No matter what happens, you need to protect this land. This isn't just land. This is your honour." After Nazo's father and brother are arrested, a scheming uncle tries to lay claim to the family farm. Nazo, with her mother and sisters, defends their land, even when it is attacked by 200 mercenaries, hired by the uncle.

== Reception ==
After its debut showing at the 2017 Edinburgh International Film Festival, My Pure Land was selected as the British entry for the Best Foreign Language Film at the 90th Academy Awards, marking the first time the United Kingdom had submitted an Urdu language film. Although it did not become one of the Academy's nominees, the "Oscar connection" helped to boost the film's profile.

Reviewers generally praised the film's beauty, its emotional impact, and the acting of Pakistani dancer Suhaee Abro as the teenaged protagonist Nazo Dharejo. The extensive use of flashbacks was interesting to some and confusing to others. The Guardian gave the film two stars out of five, calling it "a good idea gone slightly awry." The Times, giving it four out of five stars, called the film "lyrical, heart-poundingly tense and strikingly feminist."

On Rotten Tomatoes, the film has an approval rating of 94% based on reviews from 17 critics.

== Cast ==
- Suhaee Abro as Nazo
- Salman Ahmed Khan as Amir
- Tanveer Hussain Syed as Baba
- Razia Malik as Waderi
- Tayyab Ifzal as Zulfiqar
- Eman Fatima

== See also ==
- List of submissions to the 90th Academy Awards for Best Foreign Language Film
- List of British submissions for the Academy Award for Best Foreign Language Film
