= Mein Mehru Hoon =

Pakistani television series

- Genre: Soap opera
- Written by: Saira Arif; Sohail Younus
- Directed by: Naeem Qureshi
- Starring: Ahmed Hassan; Imran Aslam; Sidra Batool
- Country of origin: Pakistan
- Original language: Urdu
- No. of episodes: 265

Production
- Production location: Karachi

Original release
- Network: ARY Digital
- Release: 11 July 2016 – 28 September 2017

Mein Mehru Hoon is a Pakistani soap opera directed by Naeem Qureshi and written by Saira Arif. It aired on ARY Digital in 2017 every Monday to Thursday. It was first aired on 11 July 2016 and concluded on 28 September 2017.

== Cast ==
- Ahmed Hassan/Arsalan Faisal as Shakeel
- Imran Aslam as Azhar
- Sidra Batool as Mehru
- Tipu Shareef as Khaleel
- Nazia Malik
- Zaheen Tahir
- Sundas Guzlzar
- Shahzeen Tariq
- Ayaz Samoo
- Syed Fazal Hasnain
