= Maat (TV series) =

Pakistani teledrama

- Title screen
- Also known as: Title screen
- Genre: Romance; Drama
- Written by: Umera Ahmad
- Directed by: Amna Nawaz Khan
- Starring: Saba Qamar; Adnan Siddiqui; Aamina Sheikh; (For entire cast see below)
- Theme music composer: Farrukh Abid; Shoaib Farrukh
- Opening theme: Maat by Muhammad Ali
- Country of origin: Pakistan
- Original language: Urdu
- No. of episodes: 25

Production
- Executive producer: Asfar Sanjrani
- Producer: Momina Duraid
- Cinematography: Shahzad Kashmiri
- Editor: Husnain
- Running time: Approx. 40 minutes
- Production company: MD Productions

Original release
- Network: Hum TV
- Release: 9 September 2011 – 24 February 2012

Maat (Urdu: مات, lit. 'Defeat') is a Pakistani television series that premiered on Hum TV on 9 September 2011. The series is based on an Urdu novel of the same name by Umera Ahmad. It stars Saba Qamar and Aamina Sheikh as the contrasting sisters who take divergent paths driven by their choices and actions. The last episode of the series was telecasted on 24 February 2012.

Maat garnered mixed critical response, with praise for the leads' performances, but criticism for lacking nuance. The series earned numerous award nominations, including four at the 12th Lux Style Awards and five at the 1st Hum Awards, where it won Best Writer.

== Plot ==
Maat follows the contrasting lives of two sisters, Aiman and Saman, from a lower-middle-class family. Aiman, the elder, is polite and respectful toward her elders, while the younger Saman is ambitious and believes she can defeat (“maat”) anyone to achieve her desires.

Their cousin Faisal, engaged to Aiman, becomes infatuated with Saman’s beauty. Though Saman initially rejects him, she changes her mind after his financial situation improves, and they marry. The marriage is strained by Saman’s demanding nature, though the couple have a son, Hadeed. Unable to manage her responsibilities, Saman relies on Aiman to care for Hadeed.

Saman begins an affair with Faisal’s business partner, Azar, who is wealthier than her husband. After Faisal slaps her during an argument, Saman files for divorce and later marries Azar, leaving her family disheartened. Aiman eventually marries Faisal so that Hadeed will have a maternal figure.

Twenty-five years later, Faisal is a wealthy businessman and Hadeed, now 27, is also successful. Following Azar’s death, Saman resumes a relationship with Faisal. He decides to leave Aiman, offering her financial support and falsely claiming that Hadeed wants Saman back in their lives. Distraught, Aiman departs, while Faisal remarries Saman.

Hadeed discovers the truth, condemns both Faisal and Saman for their selfishness, and brings Aiman to live with him. Initially reluctant, Aiman accepts, recognizing that Hadeed was not responsible for his parents’ actions.

Four years later, Hadeed is married with a son, and Aiman lives peacefully with his family. Saman contacts her by phone, expressing regret for her and Faisal’s choices. Aiman forgives them but reminds Saman that their unhappiness was the result of their own actions. With this, she hangs up, happy to have finally given maat to Saman, after all.

== Cast ==
- Aamina Sheikh as Aiman
- Saba Qamar as Saman
- Adnan Siddiqui as Faisal
- Noor Hassan Rizvi as Hadeed
- Shamim Hilaly as Faisal's mother
- Rabia Noreen as Afia
- Asad Malik as Aazar
- Maheen Rizvi as Shaila
- Sadia Ghaffar as Munazzah
- Diya Mughal as Noreen

== Production ==
Aamina Sheikh and Saba Qamar were selected to portray the leads, where Sheikh portrayed Aimam, the giving elder sister to the younger selfish sibling, Saman, depicted by Qamar. Sheikh shared her insights that she initially find the character unrealistic and feeling trapped as a submissive self-sacrificing sister. However, viewers feedback made her realize the importance of portraying the complex story.

During the filming of the series, Saba Qamar briefly left the set after a disagreement with the director, but returned on Adnan Siddiqui's intervention, ensuring production continued smoothly.

== Broadcast and release ==
Maat originally aired on Hum TV in 2011.

It later premiered in the UK and Ireland on Colors Rishtey in August 2013. The show debuted in India on Zindagi on July 19, 2014, replacing Zindagi Gulzar Hai.

Maat is available to stream on MX Player, and since mid-2020, also on ZEE5 and Hum TV's official YouTube channel.

== Reception ==
=== Critical reception ===
Eefa Khalid of Dawn praised the series, noting that the dialogues are "full of impact" and the performances by Sheikh and Qamar are "excellent".

A reviewer from the Bollywood Life praised Saman's character, the mother's personality, and Aiman's potential, however, the pacing, moral posturing and overdramatic moments were critiqued.

In a mixed review published in The Caravan, the reviewer criticised the series for lacking nuance and sophistication, presenting characters in a simplistic and unambiguous manner, and relying on conventional storytelling, but praised the fascinating, albeit flawed, characters.

=== Accolades ===
Year	Awards	Category	Recipient(s)/ nominee(s)	Result	Ref.
2013	Lux Style Awards	Best Television Play - Satellite	Maat	Nominated	
2013	Lux Style Awards	Best Television Actress - Satellite	Saba Qamar	Nominated	
2013	Lux Style Awards	Best Television Director	Amna Nawaz Khan	Nominated	
2013	Lux Style Awards	Best Television Writer	Umera Ahmad	Nominated	
2012	Pakistan Media Awards	Best Drama Serial	Maat	Nominated	
2012	Pakistan Media Awards	Best Drama Director	Amna Nawaz Khan	Nominated	
2012	Pakistan Media Awards	Best Drama Actor	Adnan Siddiqui	Nominated	
2012	Pakistan Media Awards	Best Drama Actress	Aamina Sheikh	Nominated	
2012	Pakistan Media Awards	Best Drama Supporting Actor	Asad Malik	Nominated	
2012	Pakistan Media Awards	Best Drama Supporting Actress	Saba Qamar	Nominated	
2013	Hum Awards	Best Drama Serial	Maat	Nominated	
2013	Hum Awards	Best Director	Amna Nawaz Khan	Nominated	
2013	Hum Awards	Best Actress	Saba Qamar	Nominated	
2013	Hum Awards	Best Actress	Aamina Sheikh	Nominated	
2013	Hum Awards	Best Writer	Umera Ahmed	Won	
2013	Hum Awards	Best Original Soundtrack	Muhammad Ali	Nominated	
