= Nayyar Kamal =

Pakistani actress

- Born: Nayyar Kamal; 3 December 1944 (age 81); Sialkot, Pakistan
- Other name: Nayyar
- Occupations: Television actress, radio presenter
- Years active: 1964 – 1990s
- Spouse: Fazal Kamal (veteran PTV director)
- Awards: Pride of Performance Award by the President of Pakistan in 2006; Hum Awards Lifetime Achievement Award in 2013

Nayyar Kamal is a Pakistani television actress. She was the first actress who appeared in Pakistan's state-run PTV's first television play Aik Khaat on 28 November 1964.

== Serials ==
She appeared in a number of plays and dramas in the late 1990s and earlier in the 1970s. She only appeared in one film in her entire acting career:

- Duhundlay Rastay
- Aik Khaat

== Awards and recognition ==
=== Awards ===
- Nigar Award for Best Actress in 1970
- Hum Awards for Lifetime Achievement in Television in 2013
- PTV Award for Best Actress 1973 for the play Naatak
- PTV awards (Fifth PTV Awards) for Best Actress in 1984 for the play Chappar Chaaon
- PTV Silver jubilee award for acting for 50 years (1989)
- PTV Best character portrayal 2006 for the play Aadhi Dhoop
- Pride of Performance Award by the President of Pakistan in 2006
- PTV lifetime achievement award in 2009
- President award in 2013
