= Servis =

British white goods brand

- Company type: Private
- Industry: Home appliances
- Founded: 1929
- Defunct: 2020
- Headquarters: Windsor, Berkshire, UK
- Area served: United Kingdom
- Products: Domestic home appliances
- Parent: Vestel
- Website: www.servis.co.uk

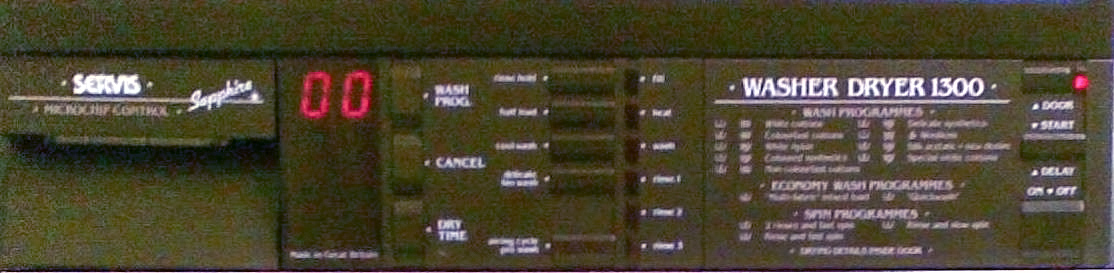
Servis Sapphire 9635 control panel(1989)

Servis was a British white goods brand. The company was founded in 1929 in Darlaston, an area of the West Midlands renowned for manufacturing. The company started out as a manufacturer, but fell into difficulties in the 1980s. From 1991 to 2008, the brand was owned and manufactured by Italian white goods company Antonio Merloni SpA. Antonio Merloni entered administration in 2008 and ceased manufacturing Servis appliances. In 2011, the brand was sold to Turkish white goods and TV manufacturer Vestel who relaunched the brand in 2012.

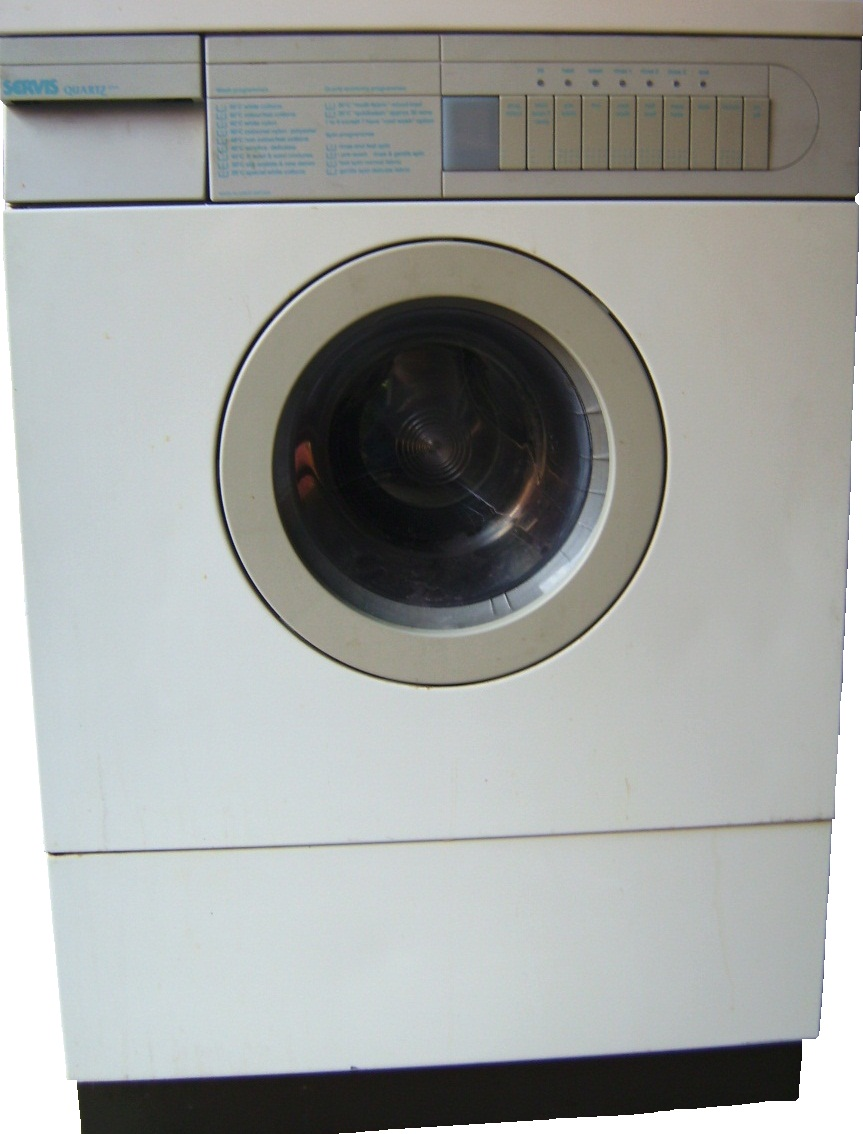
Servis Quartz Plus 4KG 1000 6033, one of the 'piano key' Servis machines.

== As a manufacturer ==
Servis Domestic Appliances manufactured washing machines (and later tumble driers). It acquired a patent on electronic controls for washing machine drums and the Servis Quartz & Servis Sapphire models were the first washing machines & washer dryers to be controlled by a microchip. The company went into liquidation in 1991. The Servis name was then acquired by Antonio Merloni SpA. In 2008 Servis appliances from Antonio Merloni SpA disappeared from stores. The Servis name is now owned by Vestel, who bought the group in 2011.

== Origins of name ==
One source suggests that the name was the result of a staff competition. A more plausible explanation is that the spelling differentiates the name for trademark purposes. During a staff training course in the 1970s, employees were told that the name of the company was derived from one of the manager's children, who had spelt "service" incorrectly.

However, back in the late 1960s/early 1970s, the Servis family lived at Flint House, Goring on Thames, now the Police Rehabilitation Centre. They were always understood to be “the Servis family of Servis washing machines”

== Liquidation ==
In October 2008, Merloni announced that it would be placing the Servis operation into liquidation with the loss of 150 jobs.

In September 2011, Vestel of Turkey was reported to have purchased the Servis brand from Antonio Merloni SpA.

In November 2020, Servis brand was shut down in favour of Sharp.
