= Haissam Hussain =

Pakistani film and television director

- Born: Haissam Hussain; Lahore, Pakistan
- Occupations: Film/TV director; TV producer; screenwriter
- Years active: 2007–present
- Awards: Lux Style Award

Haissam Hussain is a Pakistani television and film director known for television serials such as Noorpur Ki Rani (2009), Akbari Asghari (2011), Durr-e-Shehwar (2012) and Aunn Zara (2013). He made his cinematic debut by directing romantic-comedy Balu Mahi (2017).

== Personal life ==
Hussain was born to a Muslim family in Lahore, Pakistan. He has studied at the Army Burn Hall College in 1992, Punjab University in 1996, West Herts College in 2002 and Middlesex University in 2006. He directed his first telefilm Beetay Pal in 2007. He is married and the couple has 2 daughters and one son.

== Career ==
Hussain got fame with television serial Noorpur Ki Rani. He then directed romance Ishq Gumshuda, period-romance Dastaan, social domestic-drama Durr-e-Shehwar, coming of age Aik Nayee Cinderella, dark humour Akbari Asghari and romantic comedy Aunn Zara.

In 2017, he ventured into cinema by directing the romantic comedy Balu Mahi. He also directed small part of Bin Roye and then left it for unknown reasons.

In 2021, Hussain debuted as a producer and made a television comeback by directing the political-period drama Jo Bichar Gaye.

== Filmography ==
- Taming of the Shrew (2012)
- Bin Roye (2015)
- Balu Mahi (2017)

== Television ==
Year	Title	Network	Notes
2008	Choudaween Ka Chand	Hum TV	
2009	Noorpur Ki Rani	Hum TV	
2009	Jeevan Ki Rahoan Mein	Hum TV	
2010	Dastaan	Hum TV	
2010	Ishq Gumshuda	Hum TV	
2011	Kuch Pyar Ka Pagalpan	ARY Digital	
2011	Akbari Asghari	Hum TV	
2012	Aik Nayee Cinderella	Geo Entertainment	
2012	Durr-e-Shehwar	Hum TV	
2013	Aunn Zara	A-Plus TV	
2016	Bin Roye	Hum TV	
2021	Jo Bichar Gaye	Geo Entertainment	
2024	Gentleman	Green Entertainment	

=== Telefilms ===
Year	Telefilms
2008	Mutthi Bhar Mitti

== Awards and accolades ==
Year	Award	Category	Work	Result	Ref.
2011	Lux Style Awards	Best TV Director	Dastaan	Won	
2013	Lux Style Awards	Best TV Director	Durr-e-Shehwar	Nominated	
2014	Lux Style Awards	Best TV Director	Aunn Zara	Nominated	
2018	Lux Style Awards	Best Film Director	Balu Mahi	Nominated	
