= Bilqees Kaur =

Pakistani television series (2012)

- Genre: Family drama Romance
- Written by: Faiza Iftikhar
- Directed by: Adnan Ahmad
- Starring: Bushra Ansari; Khalid Ahmed; Ahsan Khan; Syra Yousuf; Sadia Imam; Kashif Mahmood; Maheen Rizvi
- Theme music composer: Waqar Ali
- Opening theme: Bullah Ki Jaana written by Bulle Shah performed by Farah Anwar
- Composer: MAD Music
- Country of origin: Pakistan
- Original language: Urdu
- No. of episodes: 19

Production
- Producer: Momina Duraid
- Production locations: Pakistan, United States
- Cinematography: Shahzad Kashmiri
- Editor: Kashif Ahmed
- Running time: ~35 minutes
- Production company: Moomal Productions

Original release
- Network: Hum TV
- Release: 15 April – 26 August 2012

Bilqees Kaur (Urdu: بلقيس كور) is a Pakistani drama television series directed by Adnan Ahmad, written by Faiza Iftikhar, and produced by Momina Duraid. It aired from 15 April 2012 to 26 August 2012 on Hum TV. Set in New York City, Karachi, Lahore, and Gujranwala, the series focuses on a conservative Pakistani family living in New York whose domineering matriarch finally meets her match in her youngest daughter-in-law.

== Overview ==
Bilqees Kaur is the story of Balwant Kaur and Iqbal Bhatti, a Pakistani-origin couple with a conservative lifestyle living in New York for 30 years. To maintain their traditional ways, the couple gets their son and daughter married into Pakistani families. However, the younger son, Sultan, thinks differently and chooses the bold and confident Soha as his wife.

== Cast and characters ==
=== Main cast ===
- Bushra Ansari as Bilqees Bhatti

Born Balwant Kaur, Bilqees is a converted Muslim who is shown to follow the religion but goes to the Gurudwara once a week to pray for her late parents. She is shown to be a controlling and oppressing mother and seemingly holds traditional views. However, in the end, it is revealed that she is overprotective, as she wants her children to do well. Bilqees's actions are driven by her guilt for eloping with Iqbal and hurting her family. Ironically, in trying to keep her new family close and subdued, she has been driving them away.

- Ahsan Khan as Sultan

Sultan wants to pursue a white-collar job and is continuing his studies meanwhile. He is shown to be attracted to his boss Liz at the start and proposes to her, but she believes in cohabiting over marriage. Sultan rejects her because of this idea and goes to Pakistan to attend his friend's wedding. There, he falls in love with Soha and marries her without his family's presence.

- Syra Yousuf Soha Sultan

She is an orphan and lives with her sister, brother-in-law, and their son. She realises her brother-in-law has wrong intentions towards her, and in a rushed decision to save her sister's married life, she marries Sultan without her sister knowing the real cause of her rushed marriage to Sultan. After marriage, she comes to New York, where she clashes with Bilqees, her mother-in-law.

- Sadia Imam as Parveen, aka Peeno

Peeno is married to Sultan's older brother Inayat (also her first cousin) and works tirelessly in Bilquees' restaurant without recognition. Despite being married for eight years, she has no children nor her husband's love and attention. However, things start to improve for her after Soha's arrival.

- Kashif Mehmood as Inayat

Bilqees' eldest son. He is a nighttime taxi driver in New York and has little feelings for his wife Peeno and does nothing for her when his mother beats her up occasionally. He enjoys going to dance shows of Pakistani actresses and gambling.

- Maheen Rizvi as Anjuman

Bilqees' youngest daughter. She goes to college, and her mother seems proud of her lack of interest in fashion and boys. However, she has fallen in love with a foreign Indian-Muslim student who has come to study in America.

- Khalid Ahmed as Iqbal Bhatti. Seemingly docile and easily cowed husband of Bilqees. He is generally good but often drinks excessively during the day. While he does try to talk for his children sometimes, he is usually met with harsh words by Bilqees, to which he never fights back. We later learn this is due to guilt for occurrences earlier on in their marriage.

=== Other credited cast ===
- Farhan Ally Agha as Kuljeet Mama-ji: Bilqees's Sikh brother also lives in New York. He loves his sister and her family. His family had disowned her when she converted. He is the only link to Bilqees's past. He is often the voice of reason and understanding for his sister. He convinces her that Sultan and Anjuman won't be coerced and have their view of life, often speaking out on their behalf. He tries to persuade her to accept Anjuman's choice of spouse, whom he treats as a daughter. He allows her to moved in when she has nowhere to go and goes so far as to arrange her marriage with her beau.
- Fawad Jalal as Hasan: Sultan's friend. He came to New York as a student and moves back to Lahore at the end of his course to marry his true love, his cousin Shafaq.
- Nadia Afghan as Mumtaz: the oldest daughter. When she was 16, Bilqees married her off to Zia, and she now lives in Punajb with Zia and their children and is tasked with finding Sultan a bride in the family when he comes to Pakistan.
- Shazia Afghan as Sobia-Aapi: Soha's older sister, wife of Farooq. While she loves her family, she is not the best housekeeper and can't seem to stay on top of things like cooking and cleaning. She is often found sleeping in the daytime with no sense of time, possibly indicating that she is going through depression. Her apparent apathy is a bone of contention with Farooq. After the death of their parents, Soha lives with Sobia and her family and is a welcome relief, helping out with the children and just generally picking up Sobia's slack. While Soha wishes her sister was better at her duties, the two sisters do love each other, and Sobia is quite hurt and upset by Soha's sudden marriage.
- Saleem Sheikh as Farooq: Sobia's husband, Soha's brother-in-law. His marriage to Sobia seems to be rocky, especially with her poor housekeeping. He actively lusts after Soha, causing her to flee.
- Adnan Gillani as Zia: Iqbal's nephew, Mumtaz's husband and Peeno's brother. Originally he seems like an affable brother-in-law/cousin helping out with the spouse hunt for Sultan and Anjuman, though we learn otherwise when he finds out about Anjuman running away, and Sultan marrying Soha.
- Maha Warsi as Elizabeth "Liz". Sultan's superior at work and, initially, a friend. While she turned Sultan down, she seems to be unduly disrespectful to Soha, and to Sultan's values which differ from her own. She originally believes Sultan caved to family pressure and married someone of their choice, and is skeptical when Sultan tells her otherwise. On meeting Soha, she immediately assumes and states that she is jealous of Sultan's knowing her, or must know all the details of his life, insinuating that she is backwards and inferior to herself.
- Jahanara Hai as Maham
- Naeem Shaikh
- Anum Fayyaz as Seemi
- Amna Khan
- Rukhsar
- Adeel Ahmed

== Broadcast and release ==
Bilqees Kaur originally premiered on Hum TV from April 15, 2012 to August 26, 2012 and aired a weekly episode every Sunday.

In India, the show was aired on Zindagi premiering from September 18, 2015.

In July 2020, the show was made available for streaming on Hum TV's Official YouTube Channel.

== Reception ==
The series received critical acclaim with major praise towards the script and Ansari's performance and character. A reviewer while reviewing the series for The Express Tribune praised her performance stating, "I must commend Ansari on her fluent and thick Punjabi accent. I think she could fool anyone in to thinking that she is really a Sikh from Punjab, such is her skill." While writing for The News International, Sadaf Haider praised the writing, for the nuanced and realistic portrayal of a minority character, specifically a Muslim convert, and the complexities of her identity and faith.

== Accolades ==
Year	Awards	Category	Nominee(s) & Recipient(s)	Result	Ref.
2013	Lux Style Award	Best Television Writer	Faiza Iftikhar	Nominated	
