= Meray Qatil Meray Dildar =

- Genre: Romance; Drama
- Written by: Aliya Bukhari
- Directed by: Asim Ali
- Starring: Mehwish Hayat; Ahsan Khan; Adnan Siddiqui; Sajal Aly
- Theme music composer: Sohail Haider
- Opening theme: Meray Qatil Meray Dildar: performed by Sara Raza Khan and Sohail Haider; Lyrics Sabir Zafar
- Country of origin: Pakistan
- Original language: Urdu
- No. of seasons: 1
- No. of episodes: 26

Production
- Production location: Pakistan
- Cinematography: Kaleem Hussain
- Editor: Kashif Ahmed
- Running time: Aprrox. 40 minutes
- Production company: MD Productions

Original release
- Network: Hum TV
- Release: 9 October 2011 – 8 April 2012

Meray Qatil Meray Dildar (Urdu: ميرے قاتل ميرے دلدار, lit. 'My slayer, my beloved'), also written as Mere Qatil Mere Dildar, is a Pakistani drama television series broadcast on Hum TV. It premiered on 9 October 2011 and ended its run on 8 April 2012.

At the annual Hum Awards, the series received ten nominations.

== Plot ==
The story revolves around Maham, a young lady in her 20s. She is madly in love with Umar, who loves her back. Umar's family does not approve of this relationship. But the young lovers finally get married after Umar's elder brother persuades them to consent. But after the marriage, Maham faces her in-laws, Umar's father, his elder brother Bakhtyar, Bakhtyar's wife Rubab, Umar's paternal aunt Durdaana and her daughter Shifa. After Maham meets Bakhtyar, she realises he has been stalking her for quite a long time. Durdhaana wanted Umar to marry Shifa. To take revenge Durdaana starts hatching plots against Maham so that all the family members turn against the young bride but never for once does Umar speak against Durdaana, even if he knows that she is wrong and is lying. Meanwhile, Bakhtyar keeps on stalking Maham and threatens her that if she informs anyone then he will get her into big trouble.

A year later, Umar's father finally asks Umar to marry Shifa and take her as a second wife after requests from Durdaana's side. However, Umar disagrees and asserts that he may leave his entire family for Maham. After this, his father suffers a heart attack and dies. Now Bakhtyar, the head of the family, exercises his authority and keeps on misbehaving with Maham. Umer blindly believes his brother and is just a puppet in his hands. Neither Maham nor Rubab dare speak out. When Bakhtyar is caught red-handed trying to harass Maham, he succeeds in putting the entire blame on her. Umar ends up divorcing Maham. Once she leaves, the family convinces Umar to marry Shifa, and he complies, even though he does not love her. Later to take revenge, Maham marries Bakhtyar. One by one, Maham avenges all her insults. Durdaana and Shifa find themselves at the receiving end. Maham even convinces the infatuated Bakhtyar to transfer his family home in her name. Meanwhile, Umar is deeply disturbed by the sight of Maham as his brother's wife.

In the end, Umar overhears Bakhtyar and Durdaana talking about how an innocent Maham had become the victim of their conspiracies. Filled with remorse, Umar rushes to apologise to Maham and begs her for another chance, but she does not respond. He divorces Shifa and leaves her with Durdaana in a dilapidated old house. Shifa goes insane, and Durdaana is left lamenting her bad luck. Meanwhile, Maham vanishes, leaving a letter explaining to Bakhtyar what she had done and why. Bakhtyar goes berserk trying to find her and dies in an accident. Rubab inherits the entire wealth and takes charge. Umar decides to go away to London, hoping against hope that he might meet Maham one day and beg for her forgiveness.

== Cast ==
- Mehwish Hayat as Maham
- Ahsan Khan as Umer
- Adnan Siddiqui as Bakhtyar
- Semra Zubair as Rubab
- Shagufta Ejaz as Durdhaana Phoopoo
- Sajal Aly as Shifa
- Qavi Khan as Umar's father
- Badar Khalil as Maham's mother
- Farhan Ali Agha as Ayaz (Maham's elder brother)
- Madiha Rizvi as Faria (Maham's sister-in-law and Ayaz's wife)
- Affan Waheed as Rehaan (Maham's brother)
- Aasma Jahangir Khan as Sana (Maham's friend and Rehaan's wife)
- Zaheen Tahira as Sana's paternal grandmother

== Broadcast ==
In UK and Ireland, the show was broadcast by several channels, Colors TV UK, Rishtey and Hum Europe. In Arab countries, the show was dubbed in Arabic and aired on MBC 4. In Mauritius, the show was broadcast by MBC Network Mauritius Broadcasting Corporation.

In India, the show was hugely popular when it first aired on 5 August 2014 on Zindagi. The show started running again in India from 27 July.

== Reception ==
=== Critical reception ===
Afreen Seher of The News International praised the portrayal of the protagonist's resilience and transformation in the face of bullying and abuse, showcasing her ultimate triumph over her abusers.

=== Awards and nominations ===
Year	Award	Category	Recipient(s) / nominee(s)	Result	Ref.
2013	Lux Style Awards	Best Television Actor - Satellite	Adnan Siddiqui	Nominated	
2013	Lux Style Awards	Best Television Actress - Satellite	Mehwish Hayat	Nominated	
