= Sadia Imam =

Pakistani television actress

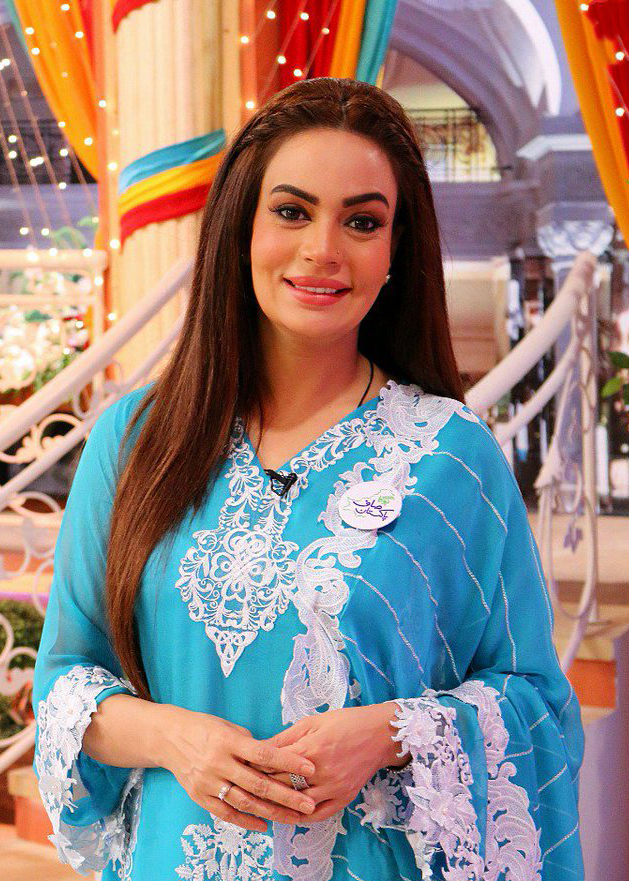
- Imam at the set of Jago Pakistan Jago.
- Born: 27 October 1976 (age 49); Rawalpindi, Punjab, Pakistan
- Occupations: Actress, television presenter, model
- Spouse: Adnan Haider (m. 2013)
- Relatives: Aliya Imam
- Awards: PTV Award in 2002

Sadia Imam is a Pakistani television presenter, actress, and model.

== Early life ==
Sadia Imam was born in Rawalpindi, Punjab, Pakistan. She has appeared in commercials, dramas, and music videos.

== Personal life ==
Sadia Imam married Adnan Haider in 2013. Sadia's key to a perfect marriage reportedly is... "as in a chess game, getting your way with a life partner requires time and patience". She is a Shia Muslim.

== Career ==
Sadia has starred in several famous dramas, such as Jab Jab Dil Miley, Colony 52, Dorhi, Tapish, Anokha Bandhan, Aangan Bhar Chandni, Koonj, and Aasman. She is one of the most popular stars in the media right now, and she also performs as a model for famous fashion houses. Regarded as one of the most dashing models on the ramp, Sadia also did a comic role in a guest appearance on the popular ARY Digital drama serial Mai Aur Tum. Since her return from Germany, she has working with GEO TV and HUM TV on their upcoming serials, and she is currently also a TV host for the Samaa TV show 'Samaa Kay Mehmaan' where she interviews celebrities and famous faces of Pakistan.

== Television Presenter ==
- Samaa Kay Mehmaan on Samaa TV in 2015.
- Mast Mornings TV show for Dawn News

== Television ==
- Choti Si Kahani
- Naseeb (PTV Home)
- Umeed (PTV Home)
- Pehli Barish
- Bande Ali Khan Aur Bandgi (PTV Short Drama)
- Saat Sur Rishton Ke
- Diya
- Ghareeb e Shehr
- Thora Sa Aasman
- Paani Pe Naam
- Pyar Mein
- Adha Chehra
- Singhar
- Kahan Se Kahan Tak
- Umrao Jan Ada (serial)
- Dil Dard Dhuan
- Rani Beti Raaj Karey
- Anokha Bandhan
- Kinara Mil Gaya Hota
- Usay Bhool Ja
- Wafa aka Loyalty
- Hum Se Juda Na Hona
- Aangan Bhar Chandni
- Dohri
- Sirf Aik Baar
- Colony 52
- Maamta
- Jab Jab Dil Milay
- Uljhan
- Ijazat
- Chahat (PTV Home)
- Abhi Door Hai Kinara (PTV Home)
- Bilqees Kaur (Hum TV)
- Ishq Junoon Deewangi
- Khaali Haath (STN)
- Musafat
- Roshan Sitara
- Khawahishon Kay Sarab

== Awards and nominations ==
- Won PTV Award at the 12th PTV Awards ceremony organized to mark 40 years of Pakistan Television ('Best Actress' PTV Award for the year 2002).
- Nomination for Best Actress in a Leading Role for Dohri on ARY TV in 2007 Lux Style Awards.

=== Lux Style Awards ===
Ceremony	Category	Project	Result
1st Lux Style Awards	Best TV Actress	N/A	Won
4th Lux Style Awards	Best TV Actress (Terrestrial)	Hum Se Juda Na Hona	Won
6th Lux Style Awards	Best TV Actress (Satellite)	Dohri	Nominated

== See also ==
- List of Pakistani actresses
