= Halka Na Lo =

2012 Pakistani sitcom

- Title screen
- Genre: Drama; Comedy
- Written by: Rizwan Hassan
- Directed by: Salman Abbas
- Starring: Agha Sheraz; Zhalay Sarhadi; Barkat Ali
- Country of origin: Pakistan
- Original language: Urdu
- No. of episodes: 72

Production
- Producer: Momina Duraid
- Production company: MD Productions

Original release
- Network: Hum TV
- Release: 31 August 2012 – 15 March 2014

Halka Na Lo (Urdu: ہلکا نہ لو, English: Don't take it easy) is a 2012 Pakistani sitcom aired every Friday on Hum TV. It was first aired on 31 August 2012 directed by Salman Abbas and written by Rizwan Hassan. The sitcom stars Agha Sheraz, Zhalay Sarhadi, Barkat Ali and Uzmi.

== Cast ==
- Agha Sheraz as Amir
- Zhalay Sarhadi as Zobi
- Barkat Ali as Salman
- Uzmi as Ghalib
