= Suhaee Abro =

Pakistani dancer and actress

- Education: The Lyceum School
- Occupations: Classical and modern contemporary dancer, actress
- Known for: Sanjha, My Pure Land
- Mother: Attiya Dawood

Suhaee Abro (Sindhi: سھائي ابڙو, Urdu: سہائی ابڑو) is a Pakistani dancer and actress. She specialises in the field of dance and is a trained classical dancer. Suhaee works in television plays, theatre, documentaries and music videos. She won the Best New Television Sensation Award (Female) at the 1st Hum Awards 2013. She is the daughter of Sindhi poet and activist Attiya Dawood.

== Early life ==
Suhaee Abro was born and raised in Karachi, Pakistan. Her mother (Attiya Dawood) is a well-known poet. Her father (Khuda Bux Abro), a visual artist, introduced her to many different kinds of world music.

Abro began her training in classical dance at the age of seven from classical dancer Sheema Kermani, and performed in her first music video at the age of eight. She began appearing in telefilms when she was twelve.

In 2010, after an injury that required surgery to her tailbone, Abro's doctor warned her not to dance. Because she had promised to perform a dance at her school, however, Abro performed sitting on the edge of the stage, just moving her hands and face, earning applause from the audience.

Abro was diagnosed with epilepsy in her late teens.

== Career as a dancer ==
Having already performed in many music videos, Abro gave her first public solo performance in 2011, at Karachi's T2F, at an evening of some of her mother's poetry.

Abro specialises in Bharatanatyam, and has also learnt Kathak and Odissi, three of eight forms of Indian classical dance and also choreographs and performs Sufi, folk, modern/contemporary as well other genres of classical dance. Abro is also one of the founders and Dance Director/Performing Artist of the group Nritaal

== Dances and choreography ==
Year	Dance Production	Choreographed and Produced	Performed in
2001–2008	Classical Dance Demonstration	Sheema Kermani	Karachi
2008	A classical dance night, 'Jugalbandi	Sheema Kermani	Karachi
2006–2011	A dance drama ballet, 'Raqs Karo' based on Fehmida Riaz's poetry	Sheema Kermani	Karachi/Lahore/Islamabad/India
2008–2010	Dance ballet – Aaj Rung Hai	Sheema Kermani	Karachi/Lahore/Islamabad
2010	Back to our beginnings	Suhaee Abro and Rajab Ali Sayed	Karachi
2010	Point of No Return	Suhaee Abro and Rajab Ali Sayed	Karachi
2011–2012	Urraan Sey Pehley' (After Flight) A 60-minute solo dance and music performance, based on feminist poet Attiya Dawood's poetry	Suhaee Abro	Karachi
2011	Khusrau-i-Nasl-i-Nau' – A dance and music performance based on the eminent Sufi poet, Hazrat Ameer Khusrau's works	Suhaee Abro and Nritaal	Karachi
2011	FAIZ CENTENNIAL CELEBRATIONS PROGRAM	Suhaee Abro and Nritaal	Karachi
2013	Raqs Mein Hai Sara Jahan – World Dance Day Celebration 2013	Suhaee Abro (Some dance pieces were choreographed by participing dancers themselves)	Karachi
2015	The Lyceum School's Annual Urdu Drama	Suhaee Abro	The Lyceum School Karachi

== Filmography ==
Year	TV Play	Role	Channel
2006	Guddi	Guddi	Hum TV
2007	Shali	Shali	Hum Tv
2007	Amtul Ki Gali	Maria Wasti's daughter	ARY Digital
2008	Bhopal wali Bilquis	Munni	Hum TV
2009	Meri Beti	Kaali	Hum TV
2011	Sanjha	Sanjha	Hum TV
2012	Tum Mujh mein Zinda ho	Nimra Bucha's teenage	Express Entertainment
2012	Jashn ka Din Hai	Insha	Express Entertainment
2012	Anamta	Anamta	Hum TV (Not aired yet)
2012	Kis Mausam ki Talash Main	Aashi	Hum TV
2013	Mann Ke Moti	Hina	Geo TV
2013	Kitni Girrhein Baqi Hain	Komal	Hum TV (Not aired yet)
2013	Jannat Ki Jannat	Jannat	(Not aired yet)
2016	Baba Ki Rani	Inshaal Feroze	ARY Zindagi
2016–2017	Sang-e-Mar Mar	Rakshi	Hum TV
2017	Yaqeen Ka Safar	Noori	Hum TV
2017	My Pure Land	Nazo	

== Theatre ==
Year	Play	Theater Name/Organizer/Festival
2007	Jinney Lahore Nahien Vaikhya	Rafi Peer Performing arts Festival
2008	Family Function	Froebel Education Center (Pakistan Arts Council Center)
2008	A Thing of Beauty by Charles Cray	Froebel Education Center (Pakistan Arts Council Center)
2011	Jung Ab Nahee Hogi	Tehrik-e-Niswan
2011	Khusrau-e-Nasl-e-Nau	Nritaal Group
2011	Uraan Se Pehlay	The Second Floor (T2F), Karachi
2012	KAFKA	National Academy of Performing Arts (NAPA) festival

== Music videos ==
Year	Music Video	Band/Organization
2002	Aseer Shahzadi' based on feminist poet, Fehmida Riaz's poetry	Tehrik-e-Niswan (Sheema Kermani)
2012	Aurat aur Mard barabar hain' based on the feminist poet, Fehmida Riaz's poetry	Tehrik-e-Niswan (Sheema Kermani)
2012	Ishq Da Kalma	The Sketches Band
2013	Mein Sufi Hoon	The Sketches Band
