= Sister of My Heart =

Novel by Chitra Banerjee Divakaruni

- First edition (US)
- Author: Chitra Banerjee Divakaruni
- Published: 1999
- Publisher: Doubleday (US); Black Swan (UK)
- ISBN: 0552997676

Sister of My Heart is a novel by Chitra Banerjee Divakaruni. First published in 1999, this novel was followed in 2002 by a sequel The Vine of Desire.

The story centers on two Indian girls, Anju and Sudha. The girls narrate their life stories in alternating chapters. The book follows Sudha and Anju through childhood, adolescence, and early adulthood. Although some of the characters immigrate to the United States, most of the story is set in India.

== Plot summary ==
=== Book one ===
Princess in the Palace of Snakes follows two cousins from birth until their wedding day. The sudden death of their fathers on a hunt for rubies sends Anju and Sudha's mothers into premature labor, and the two girls are born twelve hours apart. From a young age the girls become best friends, sisters, and each other's constant companion.

Anju and Sudha grow up in a household run by their three mothers: Pishi, Gouri, and Nalini. Even though Anju and Sudha call each other sisters, they are technically cousins. Pishi is the girls’ aunt. Pishi's youngest brother, Bijoy Chatterjee, married Gouri. Anju is their daughter. So in addition to Pishi and Gouri, there is Nalini, Sudha's mother.

Beautiful and calm, Sudha is a storyteller and dreams of designing clothes and having a family. Anju has a fierce spirit and longs to study literature in college. The girls get caught skipping school and this event, along with a health scare in the family, suddenly changes plans for college to plans of marriage. Book one ends with Anju and Sudha getting married on the same day. Sudha will move in with her husband and in-laws who live in another part of India. Anju's husband works in the United States, and she plans to join him after getting a visa.

Sudha learns a dark secret about their family's past. Shame and guilt over keeping this secret causes Sudha to pull away from Anju. But her love for her sister does not falter, and she even refuses to elope for fear it would damage Anju's reputation. On the night of their double wedding, Anju becomes aware of her husband's attraction to Sudha. Anju does not blame Sudha, but it is with some relief the two young women begin to live separate lives.

=== Book two ===
In The Queen of Swords Sudha quickly learns the ways of her demanding and controlling mother-in-law. After five long years, Sudha is elated to learn she is pregnant. Meanwhile, Anju's life in the United States has not entirely turned out as she expected. Anju and Sudha exchange regular letters and short phone calls, but their old intimacy is missing. The friends discover they are pregnant at the same time and both seem finally happy.

Sudha's mother-in-law finds out that Sudha's child is a girl. She demands Sudha abort the baby, believing the first child should be a son. Sudha has nowhere to turn, leaving her husband would be grounds to talk to each other again as true sisters. Refusing to tie her life to another man and realizing Anju needs her, Sudha and her daughter decide to go to the United States. After many years, the sisters are reunited, but future obstacles still loom.

== Characters ==
- Anjali / Anju – from a higher caste than her sister Sudha, she loves books, and is known for speaking her mind and being stubborn
- Ashok Ghosh – devoted to Sudha, he proposes several times, he is rejected by the mothers as a potential husband because of his lower caste status and money made in trade
- Basudha / Sudha – loyal to her family, Sudha is a storyteller and dreamer, and is known for her beauty.
- Bijoy Chatterjee – Anju's father and Gouri's husband, Pishi's brother, welcomes Gopal into his family like a brother.
- Gopal – Sudha's father and Nalini's husband, he persuades Bijoy to go on the doomed hunt for rubies, his past is not what it seems
- Gouri – Anju's mother, she holds the Chatterjee family together by running the family bookstore despite struggles with her health
- Nalini – Sudha's mother, she means well but can have an abrasive personality
- Pishi – widowed at a young age she joins her brother Bijoy's household and helps raise Anju and Sudha, she is a source of information and support for the girls
- Ramesh Sanyal – Sudha's husband, often travels with his job building railroads and bridges, a kind man, but unable to protect Sudha from his mother
- Ramur Ma – loyal servant and chaperone to the young girls
- Singhji – becomes the household chauffeur when the girls are five years old, a trusted but somewhat mysterious figure, in the end we find out that he is Sudha's father and Nalini's husband
- Sunil Majumdar – Anju's husband, born in India, he is a computer scientist from the United States

== Themes ==
- Fairy tales – The book is divided into two halves named after stories the girls tell each other. Often the events of the book parallel the happenings in these stories. Also mixed in with these stories, are Bengali myths and stories of the gods in the Hindu tradition.
- Marriage – Marriage is very important in Sister of My Heart. It is expected that all girls will marry. Divorce is looked down on and widows are pitied. The house the girls grow up in is very unusual in that it is run by three women. The dynamics of joint families is explored, as it is traditional for women to join their husband's families.
- Tradition / Change – Many of the expectations the Anju and Sudha face as far as education and marriage are traditional. There are set roles they must either accept or risk gaining a reputation. Dress, celebrations, and religious beliefs in the novel are very much a part of Indian culture and described in detail. By the end of the novel, however, there are changes. Both Anju and Sudha become more independent, as do their three mothers.
- Women's friendships - Anju and Sudha's friendship is a deep one and strongly developed in the novel. The three mothers - Gouri, Nalini and Pishi - are also a unique group of women running a household together.

== Reception ==
- "Beautifully blends the chills of reality with the rich imaginings of a fairy tale." The Wall Street Journal
- “Her literary voice is a sensual bridge between worlds. India and America. Children and parents. Men and women. Passion and pragmatism.” USA Today
- “Irresistible…With this enchanting novel, Divakaruni shows herself to be a skilled cartographer of the heart.” People
- “Shines with rare luminosity…Divakaruni celebrates the beauty and sustenance to be found in bonds wrought between women.” The San Diego Union-Tribune

=== Online Reception ===
“Some readers may be turned off by the novel's use of standard South Asian clichés. The scenes of forbidden love, demanding parental expectations, and difficult in-laws were, indeed, predictable. However, in Divakaruni's defense, I must say that she has an uncanny way of rescuing the cliché from its superficiality. Divakaruni is able to divert the reader's focus from the clichés through the beauty of her writing. Her poetic language, elaborate descriptions, and symbolism really do place the otherwise cliché themes on a higher level.” Julie Rajan

"Chitra Banerjee Divakaruni has written an intense, powerful book about the close relationships that women form with each other. The story is absolutely unforgettable, and it will keep you thinking about your own relationships with your friends and relatives, and just how far you would go to protect them." Judith Handschuh

== Adaptation ==
The book was adapted into a Tamil television series titled Anbulla Snegithiye.
