= List of television programmes broadcast by PTV =

This is a list of television programmes which are either currently being broadcast or have previously been broadcast by Pakistan's national television service, the Pakistan Television Corporation (PTV).

== Former Programming ==
=== Comedy ===
- Aangan Terha
- Alif Noon
- Comedy Theater
- Family Front
- Fifty Fifty
- Guest House
- Janjal Pura
- Lahori Gate
- Shashlik
- Teen Bata Teen
- 2 Good

=== Children Programming ===
- Ainak Wala Jin
- Alif Laila
- Anokhay Log
- Mobile Jin
- Sim Sim Hamara
- Avengers Assemble

=== Dramas ===
- Aahat
- Aan
- Aangan Mein Deewar
- Aansoo
- Aao Kahani Buntay Hain
- Ab Tum Ja Saktey Ho
- Achanak
- Afshan
- Alao
- Alpha Bravo Charlie
- Ana
- Andhera Ujala
- Angar Wadi
- Ankahi
- Apnay Log
- Aroosa
- Ashiyana
- Aur Zindagi Badalti Hai
- Ba Adab Ba Mulahiza Hoshiar
- Badaltay Mausam
- Bandish
- Barhtay Saye
- Barson Baad
- Boota from Toba Tek Singh
- Chaandni Raatain
- Chand Grehan
- Choti Si Kahani
- Dastak
- Darwaza
- Dasht
- Dehleez
- Dhoop Dewar
- Dhoop Kinare
- Dhoop Mein Sawan
- Dhuwan
- Dil Awaiz
- Din
- Din Dhallay
- Doordesh
- Dushman
- Fareb
- Farz
- Fishaar
- Gulls & Guys
- Gharib-e-Shehr
- Gharoor
- Hawain
- Hazaron Raaste
- Haye Jaidi
- Inkar
- Jannat
- Jannat Pur
- Jangloos
- Jhok Siyal
- Jinnah Ke Naam
- Jungle
- Kajal Ghar
- Kalmoohi
- Kami Reh Gaee
- Karawaan
- Kashkol
- Khaleej
- Khamosh
- Khuda Ki Basti
- Khuda Zameen Se Gaya Nahin
- Khuwahish
- Khawaja and Son
- Kiran
- Kiran Kahani
- Kis Se Kahoon
- Kohar
- Laag
- Landa Bazar
- Lehrain
- Main
- Manoos Ajnabi
- Marvi
- Mehndi
- Mirat-ul-Uroos
- Mirza Ghalib Bandar Road Par
- Mor Moharan
- Mishaal
- Nadan Nadia
- Neela Aasman
- Neelay Hath
- Nigah
- Nijaat
- Parchaiyan
- Parosi
- Pooray Chand Ki Raat
- Rani
- Rahain
- Roger
- Rozi
- Samjhauta Express
- Samundar
- Sehra Teri Pyas
- Shab Daig
- Shahpar
- Shama
- Shehzori
- Shella Bagh
- Shiddat
- Sitara aur Mehrunissa
- Sona Chandi
- Songsoptok
- Sunehray Din
- Talafi
- Taleem-e-Balighan
- Tanhaiyaan
- Tawan
- Teesra Kinara
- Tera Pyar Nahi Bhoole
- The Castle: Aik Umeed
- Tinkay
- Tum Mere Kya Ho
- Tum Se Kehna Tha
- Uncle Urfi
- Unsuni
- Uraan
- Umang
- Wadi-e-Purkhar
- Waris
- Zaib-un-Nisa
- Zair Zabar Paish
- Zard Dopehar
- Zamana
- Zeenat

=== Telefilms/Long Play ===
- Dhundle Raste
- Kaanch Ka Pul

=== Historical ===
- Heer Ranjha
- Shaheen
- Tipu Sultan

=== Miniseries ===
- Footpath Ki Ghaas

=== Reality/Unscripted ===
- 60 Hours to Glory
- Tariq Aziz Show

=== Acquired/Co-Production ===
- Mor Mahal
- Munkir
- Suno Chanda
- Mind Your Language (Acquired British series)

=== Turkish Series ===
- Ertugrul Ghazi
- Yunus Emre — Rah-e-Ishq
- Sultan Abdul Hameed

== Special events ==
- Cricket World Cup
- Football World Cup
- Hockey World Cup
- Olympic Games
- PTV Awards
- UEFA European Football Championship...

== See also ==
- Lists of television programs
  - Lists of animated television series
  - Lists of comedies
  - Lists of game shows
  - List of science fiction television programs
  - List of television spin-offs
