= Hameed Wain =

Pakistani actor

- Born: Hameed Wain; 11 August 1930; Delhi, British India
- Died: 4 June 1997 (aged 66); Karachi, Sindh, Pakistan
- Resting place: Karachi
- Other name: Hameed Wayne
- Education: University of Punjab
- Occupation: Actor
- Years active: 1950 – 1997
- Children: 3

Hameed Wain (Urdu: حمید وائیں) (11 August 1930 – 4 June 1997) was a Pakistani actor. He is known for his roles in dramas Ehsaas, Dhoop Kinare, Kasak and Rozi.

== Early life ==
Hameed was born in Delhi, British India. He did his early education from Delhi School later he and his family migrated to Pakistan at Lahore after partition of India. Then he completed his further education from University of Lahore and graduated with a master's degree in English literature.

== Career ==
He started working at Radio Lahore in 1950 and later he worked in theatre and stage plays. In 1962 he made his debut an actor in film Mehtab in which he starred with Nayyar Sultana, Habib and Allaudin it was directed by Shabab Kiranvi and it was a super hit film at the box office it became a Golden Jubilee. Then he worked in film Mera Kya Qasoor with Shamim Ara the film was a hit at box office it was directed by Wazir Ali. The following year in 1963 he worked in film Maa Kay Aansoo along with Nayyar Sultana, Habib, Asha Posley and Allauddin the film was based on the noval Dard-e-Dil written by Shabab Kiranvi the film was success it was a super hit at the box office it became a Golden Jubilee.

In 1964 Hameed started working on television at PTV when it was newly established and appeared in many dramas.

In 1965 he appeared in film Nain Mily Chain Kahan starring with Shamim Ara, Syed Kamal, Lehri, Nighat Sultana and Saqi the film was based on the social issues. In 1966 he worked in film Moajza which was directed by M.A. Rasheed and then he worked in Hamrahi which a super hit film at the box office it was directed by Raja Hafeez and written by Ghulam Mohammad.

Later he moved to Karachi and he worked in many dramas at PTV Karachi Centre. In 1982 he worked in drama Ankahi along with Shehnaz Sheikh, Jawed Sheikh, Shakeel and Badar Khalil which was written by Haseena Moin and directed by Shoaib Mansoor and Mohsin Ali it was one of the most popular drama in the early 1980s. In 1987 he appeared in drama Ehsaas along with Sabiha Khanum, Rahat Kazmi and Marina Khan it was written by Shahid Kazmi and directed by Shahzad Khalil and later he appeared in drama Dhoop Kinare written by Haseena Moin and directed by Sahira Kazmi in which he portrayed the role of Anji's father a strict father and he rose to fame because of his role and Dhoop Kinare became a tremendous hit amongst the audiences. The following year in 1988 he was cast in drama Flight 003 along with Shabbir Jan, Shakeel, Tahira Wasti and Zaheen Tahira it was directed by Qasim Jalil and written by Sabeh Misbah. In 1990s he also worked in several commercials and advertisements.

In 1991 he appeared in drama Sunehray Din in which he portrayed the role of Sultan the drama was directed by Shoaib Mansoor. In 1993 he starred in comedy drama Family 93 written by Kaif Rizwani and directed by Ali Rizvi along with Zaheen Tahira, Moin Akhter and Nazli Nasr.

In 1992 he worked in drama Hasina-E-Alam along with Rizwan Wasti, Tahira Wasti, Anita Ayoob and Rabia Noreen the drama was written by Fatima Surayya Bajia which was based on Waheeda Naseem's novel Hasina-E-Alam and he portrayed the role of Mr. Green. The same year in 1992 he appeared in drama Kasak with Rubina Ashraf, Qazi Wajid, Fazila Qazi and Khaled Anam which was written by Haseena Moin and directed by Tariq Khan Abbasi.

In 1994 he worked in family drama Ghar Aik Nagar along with Azra Sherwani and Jahanara Hai which was written by Fatima Surayya Bajia.

== Personal life ==
Hameed was married and had three children.

== Death ==
Hameed died on 4 June 1997 at Karachi, Pakistan and was buried at Gizri Graveyard in Karachi.

== Filmography ==
=== Television ===
| Year | Title | Role | Network |
|---|---|---|---|
| 1982 | Ankahi | Chacha | PTV |
| 1987 | Ehsaas | Noman's father | PTV |
| 1987 | Dhoop Kinare | Anji's father | PTV |
| 1988 | Flight 033 | Passenger | PTV |
| 1990 | Rozi | Nazia's father | PTV |
| 1991 | Sunehray Din | Sultan | PTV |
| 1992 | Hasina-E-Alam | Mister Green | PTV |
| 1992 | Kasak | Grandfather | PTV |
| 1993 | Family 93 | Tasmina's father | PTV |
| 1994 | Ghar Aik Nagar | Seth Sahab | PTV |
| 1996 | Chotay Baray Loag | Doctor | PTV |
| 1997 | Waqat Ka Asmaan | Doctor Daulaf | PTV |

=== Film ===
| Year | Film | Language |
|---|---|---|
| 1962 | Mehtab | Urdu |
| 1962 | Mera Kya Qasoor | Urdu |
| 1963 | Maa Kay Aansoo | Urdu |
| 1965 | Nain Mily Chain Kahan | Urdu |
| 1966 | Badnaam | Urdu |
| 1966 | Moajza | Urdu |
| 1966 | Pardah | Urdu |
| 1966 | Hamrahi | Urdu |
| 1967 | Jan Pehchan | Urdu |
| 1967 | Wohti | Punjabi |
| 1967 | Insaniyat | Urdu |
| 1968 | Shahi Mahal | Urdu |
