= Haseena Moin =

Pakistani dramatist, playwright, and scriptwriter (1941–2021)

- حسینہ معین
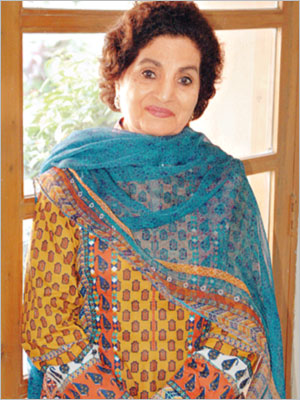
- Born: 20 November 1941; Kanpur, United Provinces, British India
- Died: 26 March 2021 (aged 79); Karachi, Sindh, Pakistan
- Other name: Haseena Apa
- Education: Government College for Women, Karachi University
- Occupations: Screenwriter, playwright, writer, educationist, principal in Fazal-ur-Rehman Govt Girls Secondary School
- Years active: 1970–2021
- Awards: Pride of Performance Award by the President of Pakistan in 1987

Haseena Moin (Urdu: حسینہ معین) (20 November 1941 – 26 March 2021) was a Pakistani dramatist, playwright and scriptwriter. She wrote several plays for stage, radio, and television. She was the recipient of the Pride of Performance award for her services to the performing arts in Pakistan. She wrote Pakistan Television's first original script Kiran Kahani aired in the early 1970s. PTV had previously relied upon novel-based scripts for its dramas. She was considered to be the best Urdu playwright and dramatist Pakistan has ever witnessed.

Some of the dramas she wrote include Ankahi, Tanhaiyaan, Kiran Kahani, Dhoop Kinaray, Aahat, Uncle Urfi, Shehzori, Kohar, Des Pardes, Pal Do Pal, Aansoo, Kasak, Parchaiyan and Parosi. Other works include Mere Dard ko Jo Zuban Milay, Kaisa Yeh Junoon, Dhundle Raste, Shayad ke Bahar Aaye, Mohim Joo, Tum Se Mil Kar, Bandish and Zair, Zabar, Pesh.

== Early life ==
Moin was born in Kanpur on 20 November 1941. She received her early education in her ancestral region and, after the independence of Pakistan in 1947, migrated with her family to Pakistan. She lived for a number of years in Rawalpindi, then moved to Lahore and, in the 1950s, settled in Karachi, where she graduated from the Government College for Women in 1960 and earned her Master of Arts in History from Karachi University in 1963. Her yearning for writing was visible right from the time she was in the final years of her schooling, as from 7th standard, beside other school activities she got selected to write a weekly column by the title of BHAI JAN for a local journal.

She wrote plays for Radio Pakistan Karachi's "Studio Number 9." Professionally, she took up the educational pursuits and started teaching. She rose to the level of Principal. It was in 1969 that Iftikhar Arif, Head of the Script Dept. at PTV-Karachi Centre, called Moin and offered her the chance to write a play for the then-forthcoming EID. Initially, Moin was nervous but took courage to pen down a play. The cast was also decided by her with Kunwar Aftab Ahmed as the director. Hence came Eid Ka Jora with Neelofer Aleem and Talat Hussain in the lead, supported by Khalid Nizami and Ishrat Hashmi.

== Career ==
=== Pakistan television ===
Most of the plays of PTV like Shehzori, Zair, Zabar, Pesh, Uncle Urfi, Ankahi, Tanhaiyaan, Parchaieyen, Bandish, Dhund, Dhoop Kinarey, Aahat, Kasak, Pal Do Pal and Tere Ajane Se were written by her. Her play Gurya which was directed by Shirin Khan with cast members Manzoor Qureshi, Shahla Ahmad Bina of Uncle Urfi, Azra Sherwani and Raju Jamil, won an award at the Global TV Plays Festival in Tokyo for best script and direction. She was the writer of the first coloured drama of Pakistan, aired on PTV called Parchaiyan, which was directed by Mohsin Ali.

She also wrote Pakistan's first original script 'Kiran Kahani' aired in the early-1970s. Before this, PTV used to rely on novel-based scripts. Most of the people at that time were not confident with the experiment but it was Mohsin Ali who encouraged her to write it. It starred Roohi Bano in the lead with Manzoor Qureshi, Begum Khursheed Mirza, Qazi Wajid and many more.

=== Indian television ===
Her drama serial Dhoop Kinare aired in 1987. A loosely based remake of the series was later made in India by the name of Kuch Toh Log Kahenge and it aired from 2011 to 2013. It was re-written by popular Indian writer Kamlesh Pandey, who stated that by remaking this play he had paid tribute to Haseena Moin. Even Tanhaiyan was quite popular. These shows are still remembered amongst the Indian masses. She wrote a play for India called Tanha, which became widely popular during its run. She also wrote a play for Doordarshan called Kash-m-kash, Arshad Mahmood composed and Tina Sani sang the title song of the play.

== Films ==
=== Lollywood ===
Moin wrote the script for the 1978 film Yahan Se Wahan Tak, starring Waheed Murad. The film was produced and directed by Syed Kamal. She also wrote the dialogues for the 1986 film Nazdekiyan which was directed by Usman Peerzada, starring Samina Peerzada and Usman Peerzada. The film was acclaimed and won prestigious national awards.

In 1998, Moin wrote Kahin Pyar Na Ho Jaye. The film was directed by Javed Sheikh and the cast included Resham, Shaan and Saleem Sheikh. Before release, the film was heavily hyped and was expected to be a success but eventually could not perform well at the box office.

=== Bollywood ===
Moin was the first Pakistani writer to write for a Bollywood film. Raj Kapoor wanted her to write the dialogues for his dream project Henna, which was released in 1991. He wanted Hina Durrani to be the lead heroine in Henna after meeting her in India during her visit with her mother Noor Jehan in 1982 but she refused then he wanted to cast Shehnaz Sheikh in the title role of the film but after she refused, Haseena Moin recommended Zeba Bakhtiar as the leading lady, thus Zeba was cast in the title role of Henna. The film was a box office success and was also chosen as India's entry for the Best Foreign Language Film at the Oscars.

Initially she was hesitant to write for a Bollywood film. During the pre-production stages Raj Kapoor died and the project was taken over by his son Randhir Kapoor. But when the film was about to be released, the Babri Mosque incident broke out and Moin wrote a letter to Randhir Kapoor in which she requested that her name should not be used to promote the film and neither should her name be mentioned in the credits as it may hurt her fans in Pakistan, thus her name was not mentioned in the credits nor was the film was promoted using her name but she was acknowledged at the end of the film. Although this incident brought a lot of loss to her, she stated in an interview that "she can do any thing for her country and sacrificing a film was very little thing for her she could also give her life for her country".

== Genres ==
Moin wrote different types of drama. She has written comedies like Shehzori, Uncle Urfi, Tanhaiyaan with best comic characters in her plays, like Mamoo, Timmy and Moby in Ankahi; Qabacha, Bukrad and Aapa Begum in Tanhaiyan, Gazi Apa in Uncle Urfi to tragedies like Parchaiyaan. From romantic dramas like Dhoop Kinaray, Ankahi, Kohar to family dramas like Aansoo, she has also written several plays based on social issues like the super hit Aahat. It was based on family planning and was directed by Sahira Kazmi. Her play Des Pardes was based on the lives of people living in Scotland and the problems they have to face. Chup Darya, a telefilm starring Sania Saeed, was based on Karachi's conditions, and Shayad ke Bahar Aye was based on women's rights. She has also written historic plays like Tansen, Meray Dard ko jo Zuban Mile, and the recent Anjaane Nagar. Her other plays include Parosi, Pal do Pal, Kasak based on the life of a single parent, Dhundle Raaste and many more.

== Recurring collaborators ==
=== Directors ===
Many of Moin's plays have been directed by Mohsin Ali. Starting from her first play Shehzori to Mohsin's last play Ik Naye Morr Pe, they had worked together in more than 10 plays. Other directors with whom Moin had repeatedly worked include Shoaib Mansoor (his debut play Ankahi and the long play Dhundle Raaste), Sahira Kazmi (she directed Haseena's two plays Dhoop Kinare and Aahat and she directed her first play Choti Choti Baatein which was also written by Moin. Sahira also acted in Haseena's Parchaiyan, M Zaheer Khan (he directed several episodes of Zer Zabar Pesh), he also directed Kohar, Aania and the remake of Kiran Kahani. Shirin Khan directed some early plays of Moin which include Uncle Urfi, Zer Zabar Pesh, Kiran Kahani and Gurya, Raana Sheikh (she directed Parosi, Shayad ke Bahar Aye and Kaisa Yeh Junoon), Ali Rizvi (he directed the Aansoo and Des Pardes as well as Meray Dard Ko Jo Zuban Mile).

== Later work ==
Her drama serial Saare Mausam Apne Hain aired on Geo TV in late 2012. The drama was directed by Ali Rizvi. Meri Behan Maya, another play by Moin, also aired from 17 September 2012 to 11 January 2013 on Geo TV. It was directed by Azfer Ali. The play was well-received and Annie Jafry was appreciated for her performance as Maya.

In 2012, a sequel to one of her most popular drama serials, Tanhaiyaan was produced. Tanhaiyan Naye Silsilay aired from 20 October 2012 to 19 January 2013 on PTV and ARY Digital simultaneously. Moin wrote the first 7 episodes and then had to go abroad, so she allowed Mohammad Ahmed to write the rest of the episodes, with a plan to write the final episode when she returned. But by the time she returned, the entire serial was written and many changes were made to the episodes she had previously completed. She was disappointed and asked the producers to remove her name from the serial, but due to copyright issues her name could not be removed. Moin has said she had nothing to do with Naye Silsilay and was very disappointed by the outcome.

A serial titled Anjaane Nagar started airing on TV ONE from May 2013. It was a period play set in 1939 and was shot at beautiful locations in Murree and the Northern Areas. It was directed by veteran director Khawaja Najam ul Hassan. It received critical acclaim upon its release.

An Eid telefilm titled Ooper Gori Ka Makaan aired from Express Entertainment in 2013. The telefilm was a romantic comedy and was directed by Yasir Nawaz. The cast included Neelam Munir and Junaid Khan in the lead roles.

Her serial Mohabbat Ho Gai Tumse, a story of four friends aired from TV ONE in August 2015. It was directed by the channel's chairperson Seema Taher Khan and starred Adnan Siddiqui, Deeba Naz, Zhalay Sarhadi, Azfer Rehman and Hira Tareen in lead roles.

== Awards and achievements ==
Moin visited won the Pride of Performance Award in 1987 for her services to the performing arts in Pakistan. It is one of the highest civil awards conferred by the Pakistan Government. She had won many other awards including the Woman of the Year award. In 1975 she also won an award at the Global TV Plays Festival in Tokyo for best script and direction for her play Gurya. She had won accolades at nearly every year's Lux Style Awards as well as PTV Awards, during the late 1980s Moin Akhtar gave a tribute to her at a PTV awards ceremony. She had also appeared in many talk shows such as Anwar Maqsood's LG TV SHOW and Marina Mornings and many other numerous morning shows and chat shows. Most recently she appeared in The Big Show on CNBC alongside another legendary writer Fatima Surayya Bajia.

== Politics and other work ==
With the increasing popularity of Imran Khan's political party Pakistan Tehreek-e-Insaaf many famous people including Haseena Moin had joined this political party.

== Death ==
Moin died on 26 March 2021 at the age of 79 in Karachi. She had been battling cancer for the past few years, however, the immediate cause of her death has not been revealed. She was last spotted in Karachi Arts Council on 22 March 2021 when she got her first Corona vaccine, just 4 days before her death. As mentioned in the local newspaper The News, she shared her experience with the fans, saying "I have just got the coronavirus vaccine. I want to tell everyone it's not painful at all". Her funeral prayers were held on Friday, in the area of North Nazimabad in Karachi.

== Filmography ==
=== Television ===
Dramas
Title	Channel	Director	Cast	Additional Notes
Shehzori	PTV	Mohsin Ali	Shakeel, Neelofar Abbasi, Arsh Muneer, Ishrat Hashmi, Mahmood Ali, Khalid Nizami, Subhani Ba Yunus, Mohammad Yousuf	Her debut serial. Adapted from Azeem Baig Chughtai's work
Kiran Kahani	PTV	Shrin Khan & Mohsin Ali	Roohi Bano, Manzoor Qureshi, Qazi Wajid, Mahmood Ali, Begum Khursheed Mirza, Zafar Masood, Jamshed Ansari, Babra Sharif	First original script in Pakistani Television history. It was released in 1973.
Uncle Urfi	PTV	Mohsin Ali & Shrin Khan	Shakeel, Shahla Ahmad, Jamshed Ansari, Qurban Jillani, Azra Sherwani, Begum Khursheed Mirza, Naheed Rafique	Shakeel's most memorable role
Zair, Zabar, Pesh	PTV	Shrin Khan & M Zaheer Khan	Roohi Bano, Shakeel, Zeenat Yasmin, Jamshed Ansari, Begum Khursheed Mirza, Qazi Wajid	
Parchhaiyan (1976)	PTV	Mohsin Ali & Shirin Khan	Rahat Kazmi, Sahira Kazmi, Talat Hussain, Shakeel, Begum Khursheed Mirza, Azra Sherwani	Pakistan's first coloured serial. Adaptation of Henry James' The Portrait of a Lady.
Ankahi (1982)	PTV	Mohsin Ali & Shoaib Mansoor	Shehnaz Sheikh, Shakeel, Javed Sheikh, Jamshed Ansari, Badar Khalil, Qazi Wajid, Salim Nasir, Behroze Sabzwari	Shoaib Mansoor's debut play
Tanhaiyaan (1985)	PTV	Shahzad Khalil	Shehnaz Sheikh, Marina Khan, Asif Raza Mir, Behroze Sabzwari, Badar Khalil, Qazi Wajid, Azra Sherwani, Jamshed Ansari, Durdana Butt	Marina Khan's first major serial. Shehnaz Sheikh's last serial
Dhoop Kinare	PTV	Sahira Kazmi	Rahat Kazmi, Marina Khan, Badar Khalil, Sajid Hassan, Kehkashan Awan, Qazi Wajid, Azra Sherwani, Ishrat Hashmi, Hameed Wain	Also broadcast in the Middle-East
Rumi	PTV	Manzoor Qureshi	Begum Khursheed Mirza, Qayum Arif, Farzana, Yasir	
Bandish	PTV	Mohsin Ali, Shirin Khan	Khalida Riyasat, Mahmood Masood, Talat Hussain, Salim Nasir, Zeba Shehnaz, Zafar Masood, Mohammad Yousuf	Khalida Riyasat's first major serial
Dhund	PTV	Shirin Khan, Manzoor Qureshi	Roohi Bano, Khalida Riyasat, Mahmood Masood, Begum Khursheed Mirza	Adapted from the novel, "My Cousin Rachel."
Balaa e Jaan	PTV	Zaheer Khan	Kamal Ahmed Rizvi	
Aahat	PTV	Sahira Kazmi	Sania Saeed, Salman Ahmed, Samina Ahmed, Qazi Wajid, Talat Naseer, Huma Nawab, Salma Zafar	Sania Saeed's most memorable role till date
Parosi	NTM	Raana Sheikh	Khalida Riyasat, Marina Khan, Badar Khalil, Ali Ejaz, Saleem Sheikh, Jamal Shah, Shamim Hilaly, Humera Syed	Khalida Riyasat's last serial
Kasak	PTV	Mohsin Ali	Rubina Ashraf, Jehanzaib Gorchani, Khalid Anum, Fazila Qazi, Hameed Wain, Safia Khairi, Zeenat Yasmeen, Qazi Wajid	Aired during PTV's 'dupatta policy'
Tansen	PTV	Khawaja Najam ul Hasan	Asif Raza Mir, Zeba Bakhtiar, Jehanzaib Gorchani, Sajid Hassan, Humaira Syed, Shakila Hassan, Hassam Qazi	Historical Drama, based on Tansen's life
Kohar	PTV	M Zaheer Khan	Marina Khan, Shakeel, Junaid Butt, Frieha Altaf, Salma Zafar, Fauzia Wahab, Sahab Qazalbash, Jamshed Ansari	Late politician Fauzia Wahab acted in this play
Jaane Anjaane	PTV	Javed Fazil	Nadia Jamil, Vaneeza Ahmed, Humayun Saeed, Asad, Talat Hussain, Samina Ahmed	Nadia Jamil's debut
Pal Do Pal	PTV	Mohsin Ali	Nadia Khan, Ali Azmat, Adnan Siddiqui, Asad, Qazi Wajid, Andleeb Iqbal, Humaira Syed, Safia Khairi	Nadia Khan's debut
Des Pardes	PTV	Ali Rizvi	Nadia Khan, Zulfiqar Sheikh, Tamina Sheikh, Talat Hussain, Nabeel, Hassam Qazi, Zaheen Tahira, Yasmeen Ismail,	Shot in Scotland
Aansoo	PTV	Ali Rizvi	Talat Hussain, Sakina Samo, Shagufta Ejaz, Nabeel, Zulfiqar Sheikh, Maheen, Tasmina Sheikh, Noman Ejaz, Asad	Shot in Scotland
The Castle: Aik Umeed	PTV	Zulfiqar Sheikh	Talat Hussain, Shakeel, Shagufta Ejaz, Samina Ahmed, Rehan Sheikh, Humayun Saeed, Tasmina Sheikh, Asma Anwar, Bilal Ahmed	Shot in Scotland
Shayad Ke Bahar Aaye	PTV	Raana Sheikh	Shafi Mohammad Shah, Parveen Malik, Sania Saeed, Humayun Saeed, Tooba Siddiqui, Shahood Alvi, Imran Abbas Naqvi	Based on women rights
Teray Aajaney Se	TV ONE	Zulfiqar Sheikh	Samina Peerzada, Qazi Wajid, Iman Ali, Naheed Shabbir, Imran Abbas Naqvi, Asad Malik, Nabeel, Tasmina Sheikh	Shot in Scotland
Meray Dard Ko Jo Zuban Mile	PTV Home	Ali Rizvi	Asif Raza Mir, Rabi Peerzada, Angeline Malik, Tipu Sharif, Farooq Zameer, Shamim Hilali, Noman Masood	Asif Raza Mir's come back serial
Tum Se Mil Kar	PTV	Parvez Malik	Shakeel, Usman Peerzada, Vaneeza Ahmed, Imran Malik, Munawar Saeed, Aurangzeb, Jia Ali, Sajjad Kishwer	Directed by Legendary Film Director Parvez Malik
Ik Nae Mor Par	PTV	Mohsin Ali	Talat Hussain, Jamshed Ansari, Samina Ahmed, Qaiser Khan, Sonia Rehman, Shamil Khan, Rohaina Hussain	Mohsin Ali's last serial, Remake of her own serial Zer Zabar Pesh
Kiran Kahani	PTV World	M Zaheer Khan	Nadia Jamil, Rehan Sheikh, Shahood Alvi, Jamshed Ansari, Sajida Syed, Latif Kapadia, Safia Khairi	Remake of her own serial starring Roohi Bano, aired in the 1970s
Kaisa Yeh Junoon	ARY Digital	Raana Sheikh	Asif Raza Mir, Sawera Nadeem, Adnan Siddiqui, Ali Kazmi, Ayesha Omer, Azfer Rehman, Kirron Kher	Only the dialogues were penned by Hasina Moin
Kuch Tou Kaha Hota	TV ONE	M Zaheer Khan	Adnan Siddiqui, Zainab Qayyum, Jamshed Ansari, Zaheen Tahira, Behroz Sabzwari, Ali Salman	Original story by late Mohsin Ali
Choti Si Kahani	PTV Home	Kamran Qureshi	Adnan Siddiqui, Ayesha Khan, Nadia Hussain, Farhan Ali Agha, Sadia Imam, Duradana Butt	Brand endorsement serial
Kashmakash	Doordarshan		Javed Jaffrey, Suchitra Krishnamoorthi	Indian drama
Tanha	Star Plus	Paresh Kamdar	Marina Khan, Sajid Hasan, Sushma Seth, Asif Sheikh, Atul Agnihotri, Vivek Mushran	Indian drama
Saaray Mausam Apne Hain	GEO TV	Ali Rizvi	Farooq Zamir, Tanveer Jamal, Hassan Soomro, Sakina Samo, Sohail Asghar, Hammad Farooqui, Kanza Wyne	VJ Kanza's Debut Serial
Tanhaiyan- Naye Silsilay	PTV Home & ARY Digital	Marina Khan	Asif Raza Mir, Marina Khan, Behroze Sabzwari, Qazi Wajid, Badar Khalil, Durdana Butt, Alishba Yousuf, Syra Yousuf, Shehryar Munawar, Shehroze Sabzwari	Only a few episodes were written by her, but the entire drama is written by Mohd. Ahmed, changes were also made in the episodes written by Haseena Moin. She disassociated herself from the project.
Meri Behan Maya	Geo TV	Azfar Ali, Iqbal Ansari	Neelam Munir, Annie Jaffrey, Danish Taimoor, Javed Sheikh, Shamim Hilali, Bindiya, Zarar Khan	
Anjaane Nagar	TV ONE	Khawaja Najam ul Hasan	Yamina Peerzada, Zainab Ahmed, Asad, Imran Rizvi, Kiran Tabeer, Shamyl Khan, Marvi Sarmad, Rashid Mahmood, Humaira Syed	Period Play, Set in the 1930s
Mohabbat Ho Gai Tumse	TV ONE	Seema Taher Khan	Adnan Siddiqui, Deeba Naz, Zhalay Sarhadi, Yasir Mazhar, Azfer Rehman, Hira Tareen	

Telefilms (Long Plays)
Title	Channel	Director	Cast	Additional Notes
Naya Raasta	PTV	Kunwar Aftab Ahmed	Shakeel, Neelofar Abbasi	Shakeel's debut play, her first ever play written for television
Happy Eid Mubarak	PTV	Kunwar Aftab Ahmed	Shakeel, Neelofar Abbasi, Khalid Nizami, Ishrat Hashmi, Jamshed Ansari	
Gurya	PTV	Shirin Khan	Shahla Ahmad, Manzoor Qureshi, Azra Sherwani, Raju Jamil, Farzana	Won the best script award at Tokyo
Mohim Joo	PTV			
Eid Ka Jora	PTV		Neelofar Abbasi, Talat Hussain, Arsh Muneer	
Raabta	PTV	Shirin Khan	Talat Hussain, Dabu, Iqbal Sherwani, Naheed Sherwani, Begum Khursheed Mirza	Long Play on Pakistan Telecommunication
Roshni	PTV	Muhammad Nisar Hussain	Asif Raza Mir, Huma Hameed, Farooq Zameer	Aired in 1983
Mayke Ka Bakra	PTV		Shafi Mohammad Shah, Jamshed Ansari	
Chalte Chalte	PTV	Mohsin Ali	Mehmood Masud, Shakeel, Qazi Wajid, Badar Khalil, Bushra Ansari, Jamshed Ansari, Javed Sheikh, Sajida Syed	Theater Play
Saagar Ka Aansoo	PTV	Shahzad Khalil	Gulab Chandio, Bushra Ansari, Nosheen Usman, Ubaida Ansari, Saleem Iqbal, Aslam Latar, Yaqoob Zakaria	Based on John Steinbeck's novel Pearl
Choti Choti Baatein	PTV	Sahira Kazmi	Huma Akbar, Asif Raza Mir, Begum Khursheed Mirza, Imtiaz Ahmed	Eid ul Fitr special play aired in 1985
Dhundle Raaste	PTV	Shoaib Mansoor	Junaid Jamshed, Salman Ahmed, Rohail Hayyat, Shahzad Hasan, Tabinda Sheikh, Nayyar Kamal	Famous band Vital Signs acted in this play (Their only play)
Chup Dariya	PTV		Sania Saeed	Based on Karachi's condition
Sangsaar	PTV	Shirin Khan	Rahat Kazmi, Sahira Kazmi	Written in 1975 for PTV's second Jash-e-Tamseel, Won award for best writer
Mausam-e-Gul	PTV	Manzoor Qureshi	Shafi Mohammad Shah, Arshad Mehmood, Rubina Ashraf, Khalid Anum, Mahmood Akhter	Aired on Eid ul Fitr 2002
Dua	PTV	Raana Sheikh	Nadia Jamil, Shabbir Jan, Ahson Talish	Based on a real incident
Gharonda	PTV	Ali Rizvi	Raju Jamil, Ismat Zaidi, Nazli Nasr	23 March Special Play
Waqt Ko Tham Lo	PTV	Misbah Khalid	Manzoor Qureshi, Shamim Hilaly, Gul-e-Rana, Esha Noor, Irfan Khan	Aired in March 2013, Based on Cancer Patients
Ooper Gori Ka Makaan	Express Entertainment	Yasir Nawaz	Neelam Munir, Junaid Khan, Sarah Khan, Khalid Malik, Jahanara Hai, Azra Mohyeddin	Aired on Eid ul Fitr 2013

=== Cinema ===
Screenplays
Year	Title	Director	Cast	Additional Notes
1978	Yahan Se Wahan Tak	Syed Kamal	Waheed Murad, Ali Ejaz, Mumtaz, Asif Khan	
1986	Nazdikiyan	Usman Peerzada	Usman Peerzada, Samina Peerzada	
1991	Henna	Randhir Kapoor	Zeba Bakhtiyar, Rishi Kapoor, Farida Jalal, Reema Lagoo, Saeed Jaffery	India's entry for Best Foreign Language Film at the Oscars
1998	Kahin Pyar Na Ho Jae	Javed Sheikh	Resham, Shaan, Saleem Sheikh, Meera	
