= Shahzad Khalil =

Pakistani television director and producer

- شہزاد خلِیل
- Born: 1944; Muzaffarpur, Bihar, British India
- Died: 23 December 1989 (aged 44–45); Karachi, Pakistan
- Resting place: Defence Graveyard Karachi
- Occupations: TV Producer; Television Director
- Years active: 1970–1989
- Employer: Pakistan Television Corporation
- Notable work: Tanhaiyaan; Teesra Kinara; Dhoop Kinara
- Spouse: Badar Khalil
- Children: 2
- Awards: Pride of performance award 1st Indus Drama Awards

Shahzad Khalil (Urdu: شہزاد خلِیل, 1944 – 23 December 1989) was a Pakistani television director and producer.

== Early life ==
Shahzad Khalil began his career as a director producing music videos in 1970, and then moved to making television drama serials. After a few projects he moved from Pakistan Television Corporation (PTV), Lahore Center to its Karachi Center.

== Career ==
Khalil was not only an intelligent TV director but he had a great personality. He gained fame in a very short period of time as a result of the dramas he directed for PTV. He was first recognised as a director for his 1980 TV serial Teesra Kinara, which starred several legendary actors including Sahira Kazmi, Usman Peerzada, Rahat Kazmi, Shafi Mohammad, and Jamil Fakhri. Shahzad Khalil met Badar Khalil when she played the title role in the drama Bi Jamalo which he directed. They later married and have two children.

Shahzad Khalil's classic drama Tanhaiyaan was aired in 1985. Veteran actors cast in this serial included: Shehnaz Sheikh, Marina Khan, Badar Khalil, Azra Sherwani, Asif Raza Mir, Behroze Sabzwari, Qazi Wajid, Jamshed Ansari, Yasmeen Ismail, Durdana Butt, Mohammad Yousaf, Sultana Zafar, Subhani Ba Younus, and Imtiaz Ali. Haseena Moin who wrote Tanhaiyaan said: "The experience of working with Shehzad was wonderful. He was a thorough gentleman and extremely good in his work."

Shahzad Khalil introduced several actors such as Shafi Muhammad Shah in Teesra Kinara and Samina Peerzada in Panah among others, who went on to become superstars in the Pakistani television industry.

In 2014, when his wife Bader Khalil emigrated to Canada to live with her son she said in an interview with Dawn News: "PTV is celebrating its 50th anniversary; I don't see any remembrance for Shahzad Khalil. Are people so easily forgotten? It is hard to believe!"

Shahzad Khalil is known as one of the best Pakistani directors and will be remembered for his work and his role in Pakistan's television history. Indus TV Network presented a special award to Khalil for his outstanding contributions to Pakistan television at the 1st Indus Drama Awards in 2005, presented by Agha Nasir and Ghazanfar Ali.

== Personal life ==
Shahzad Khalil's wife is a veteran Pakistani TV actress, Badar Khalil. They have two grown up children, Ibrahim and Umar.

== Illness and death ==
Shahzad Khalil died of cardiac arrest on 23 December 1989 at the age of 45. His funeral prayers were held at Karachi's Defence Housing Authority graveyard, where he was then buried.

== Notable television works ==
- Teesra Kinara (1980)
- Bi Jamalo
- Tanhaiyaan (1985)
- Urta Asman
- Rashid Minhas Shaheed
- Panah
- Ehsaas
- Saagar Ka Aansoo
- Platform
- Dastak

== Honour ==
The Government of Pakistan named a street after him in Karachi in 1986.

== Awards and recognition ==
Year	Award	Category	Result	Ref.
1981	Nigar Award	Best Producer	Won	
1986	Pride of Performance Award	Arts	Won	
1986	Nigar Award	Best Producer	Won	
2005	1st Indus Drama Awards	Special Award for Outstanding Contribution to TV	Won	
