= Sahab Qazalbash =

Pakistani actress (1926–2004)

Sultana Qazalbash
- سحاب قزلباش
- Born: Sultana Qazalbash; 12 May 1926; Jhalawar, British Raj, British India
- Died: 26 July 2004 (aged 78); London, United Kingdom
- Other names: Sahab Qazilbash
- Education: Queen Mary School
- Occupations: Actress; poet; writer; broadcaster; singer; voice actress
- Years active: 1936 – 2004
- Children: 1

Sultana Qazalbash, also known as Sahab Qazalbash (Urdu; سحاب قزلباش; May 12, 1926 – July 26, 2004) was a Pakistani actress, writer, poet and broadcaster. She appeared in dramas including Comedy Playhouse Season 11, The Changes, Play for Today Season 11 and Kohar.

== Early life ==
Sahab was born in 1926 at Jhalawar, a Sikh state at Jhalawad of Rajasthan, in British India. Her parents were from Delhi and they returned to Delhi, where she went to Queen Mary School and completed her education. Sahab's father, Agha Shayar Qazalbash, was a student of the poet Daagh Dehlvi. She listened to the ghazals of Behzad Lucknavi, Hairat Dehlavi and Jigar Moradabadi with a focus on mushairas. Her father Agha Qazalbash was a classical Delhi poet, but was known by his pen name Shaer.

She started working at All India Radio in Dehli when she was ten years old, reciting poems and singing ghazals. She practiced literature and mushairas with her father. Sahab's brothers Agha Aftab and Agha Sarkhush Qazalbash were writers. She learned the Persian language from her father.

== Career ==
She worked at All India Radio reading the news in English and Hindi. She also worked in Children's Program. After the partition of India, she and her family moved to Karachi in Pakistan. In Karachi she joined Radio Pakistan and worked in her first drama Anarkali, portraying Anarkali. Later she joined Mushaira.

She later moved to Iran and settled at Zahedan where she worked in radio. But after some time, she moved to Nigeria. In 1958 she moved to London in the United Kingdom. She worked briefly at the High Commission of Pakistan and Imperial War Museum but left to join the BBC. She worked at BBC Urdu and became a part of Shaheen's Club, a children's programme. She portrayed the role of Sultana.

She also wrote some magazines and newspapers. In 1971 she made her debut an actress in sitcom Comedy Playhouse Season 11, where she portrayed the role of Sandri. Then in 1975 she worked in the children's science fiction television series The Changes in which she portrayed the role of Grandmother. In 1981 she portrayed the role of Amina's mother in Play for Today Season 11 which was a British television anthology drama series.

In 1991 she appeared in drama Kohar along with Marina Khan, Shakeel, Jamshed Ansari and Fauzia Wahab it was written by Haseena Moin and was about alter ego. Haseena Moin mentioned that she studied psychology, so she could properly show alter ego aspect on screen. She portrayed the role of Dur-e-Shehwar grandmother of Shamin and she takes care of Shamin portrayed by Marina after her mother dies.

She worked for fifty years at BBC London and television, before writing books and poems.

== Personal life ==
Sahab was married and she had one son.

== Death ==
Sahab died at her home in London at age 78 on 2004 in July 26.

== Filmography ==
=== Television ===
Year	Title	Role	Network
1971	Comedy Playhouse Season 11	Sandri	BBC One
1975	The Changes	Grandmother	BBC
1975	Tabeer	Ladli Begum	PTV
1976	Bandish	Samina	PTV
1981	Play for Today Season 11	Amina's mother	BBC One
1985	Aakhri Chatan	Jochi	PTV
1991	Kohar	Dur-e-Shehwar	PTV

== Bibliography ==
Sahab authored a collection of short stories Badliyaan. In 1946 she wrote Lafzon Ke Pairahan which was an anthology of poems. In 2001 she wrote Mera Koi Maazi Nahi which was about her past memoirs and meeting poets Meeraji, Noon Meem Rashid and Faiz Ahmad Faiz. She wrote another book titled Mulko Mulko Shehro Shehro which was a travelogue and the countries she visited Egypt, England, Iran, Nigeria and France.
