= Tanhaiyan Naye Silsilay =

Pakistani television series

- Genre: Drama; Romance; Social
- Written by: Haseena Moin; Syed Mohammad Ahmed
- Directed by: Marina Khan
- Starring: Marina Khan; Asif Raza Mir; Badar Khalil; Behroze Sabzwari; Qazi Wajid; Durdana Butt; Syra Yousuf; Alishba Yousuf; Shehroz Sabzwari; Shehryar Munawar Siddiqui
- Country of origin: Pakistan
- Original language: Urdu
- No. of episodes: 13

Production
- Producer: A & B Entertainment
- Running time: 40-45 Minutes

Original release
- Network: ARY Digital; Pakistan Television Corporation
- Release: 20 October 2012 – 19 January 2013

Tanhaiyan Naye Silsilay (also known as Olper's Tanhaiyaan: Naye Silsilay) is a Pakistani romantic social drama serial directed by Marina Khan that aired on ARY Digital and Pakistan Television Corporation. It is a sequel to the 27-year-old serial Tanhaiyaan (1986), which is considered a cult classic.

== Background ==
After 27 years, a sequel named "Olper's Tanhaiyan: Naye Silsilay" started airing at 8 pm every Saturday on PTV and ARY Digital from 20 October 2012. The script was co-written by Haseena Moin, who authored the 1986 original, and Mohammad Ahmed. The plot is about gaps in relationships developed over the years in the lives of characters owing to events they faced and how, going forward, things can change for the better. It is a 13-episode sequel directed by Marina Khan. Six of the 16 original cast members reprise heir roles, as Shehnaz Sheikh (the female lead in the original) has retired and the rest have died. The new cast members include Alishba Yousuf and Shehryar Munawar Siddiqui in lead roles and Syra Yousuf and Shehroz Sabzwari in supporting roles.

== Plot ==
It is now 27 years after the events of Tanhaiyan. Zara (Shehnaz Sheikh) and Zain (Asif Raza Mir) have since married and moved to the United States. It is the day of Zara's birthday, and Saniya (Marina Khan), who has not heard from Zara in several years, insists on celebrating it at home with Aani (Badar Khalil), Faran (Qazi Wajid), and Bibi (Durdana Butt). Later that day, Bibi receives a phone call from Zain, who says he will be arriving that night. Excitedly, the whole house prepares for Zara's long-awaited return. However, when Zain arrives with his daughters, Zeniya (Alishba Yousuf) and Serena (Syra Yousuf), he announces that Zara has died. Saniya and the rest of the household are devastated.

The serial revolves around Saniya coming to terms with her sister's death and wanting answers from Zain, who refuses to explain what happened to Zara. Meanwhile, Zeniya and Serena adjust to life in Pakistan. Serena remains optimistic and upbeat, forming a bond with her aunt Saniya and Bibi and wanting to stay in Pakistan because being with her relatives makes her feel close to her mother. However, Zeniya remains bitter, angry, and upset with her father and insists on going back to the United States. Zain gives Saniya a tape recording in which Zara speaks to her sister and explains her lack of contact; however, it doesn't give Saniya the answers she is looking for.

There is disruption outside the house as a mysterious owner is moving into the house next door.The mover turns out to be Qabacha (Behroze Sabzwari), who has returned from Dubai and has moved in with his son Iltatmish (Shehroz Sabzwari). Serena becomes close to Iltatmish, often playing pranks on him in the same manner as Saniya did with Qabacha 27 years ago. Bibi continues to provide humour in the house, often pushing around the new maid in the same way Aapa Begum (Azra Sherwani) treated Buqrat (Jamshed Ansari). Faran has since turned quiet, moody, and curmudgeonly, often staying in his room and not wanting to see anybody. Aani explains to Qabacha that he has been like this since a business deal went wrong and the family had lost everything.Qabacha vows to help the family and regain Faran's affection.

Zeniya, who still wants to return home, meets Zarak (Shehryar Munawar Siddiqui), who works at the youth centre that Saniya manages, hoping to open his own school. Zarak takes a shine to Zeniya, but she initially rejects him. Meanwhile, Serena wonders why Saniya has never married and tries to find her an ideal match, which ends in humorous disaster. She later finds out about Saniya's history with Qabacha. Zain has a box that is locked and hidden, Zeniya is eager to know what her father is hiding. In an angry confrontation, Zeniya drops the box on the floor, and it breaks open. The box contained letters and pictures of Zara, Zain had been secretly grieving to remain strong for his daughters. Zeniya apologises for her behaviour, and they make up.

Zain finally explains to Saniya and the rest of the family about Zara's death. It is revealed that Zara once again became withdrawn and depressed when they moved to the United States, furthermore, she was angry and upset that Zain had a female business partner. This led to arguments between the couple, and Zara began to overdose, secretly ordering pills from Pakistan. Saniya blames Zain for Zara's demise, but he explains that he never stopped loving her, the pair later make peace. Zeniya and Zarak eventually get engaged, and Zeniya becomes open to the idea of remaining in Pakistan. On the night of the engagement, Iltatmish asks Saniya about her relationship with Qabacha. She explains that she only sees him as a friend, because their friendship is too special and doesn't need to change. The serial ends with the whole family together at Zeniya and Zarak's engagement.

== Cast ==
- Marina Khan as Sania Ahmed
- Asif Raza Mir as Zain
- Badar Khalil as Aani
- Behroze Sabzwari as Qutbuddin 'Qabacha'
- Qazi Wajid as Faraan
- Durdana Butt as Bibi
- Syra Yousuf as Serena
- Alishba Yousuf as Zeniya
- Shehroz Sabzwari as Shamsuddin Iltatmish
- Shehryar Munawar Siddiqui as Zarak Khan
- Kaif Ghaznavi as Chandni
- Salma Hassan as Sania's friend

== Soundtrack ==
Hain Yeh Silsilay

Soundtrack album by Aamir Zaki and Zoe Viccaji
- Genre: Theme song
- Length: 37:45
- Language: Urdu
- Producer: fat cat Entertainment

Tanhaiyan Naye Silsilay's title song Hain Yeh Silsilay is sung by Zoe Viccaji, composed by Shani Haider and lyrics by Shahi Hasan.

Tracklist
No.	Title	Singer(s)	Length
1.	"Hain Yeh Silsilay"	Zoe Viccaji	3:13

== Controversy ==
In an interview with Dawn, Haseena Moin voiced her disappointment with the sequel, criticizing Marina Khan's direction, Mohammad Ahmed's writing, and the sponsor's association with the project. Due to her creative differences with the team, she was unwilling to have her name attached to the series and even asked to remove it from the credits.

== Accolades ==
Year	Awards	Category	Nominee(s)/ recipient(s)	Result	Ref.
2013	Lux Style Awards	Best TV Track	Zoe Viccaji	Nominated	
