= Azra Sherwani =

Pakistani actress (1940–2005)

- Azra Sherwani in Aangan Terha
- Born: Azra Begum; 1 January 1940; Meerut, British India
- Died: 19 December 2005 (aged 64–65); Oklahoma City, Oklahoma, United States
- Other names: Apa Begum
- Occupation: Television actress
- Years active: 1960s-2005
- Known for: Uncle Urfi (1972); Parchaiyan (1976); Aangan Terha (1984); Tanhaiyaan (1986); Dhoop Kinarey (1987)
- Spouse: Nafees Sherwani
- Children: 1

Azra Sherwani (1940–2005) was a Pakistani Television (PTV) actress with a career spanning over 35 years who played a variety of roles. Amongst her most memorable roles are Ghazi Apa in Uncle Urfi, Saliha Begum in Aangan Terha, Apa Begum in Tanhaiyaan and Fazeelat in Dhoop Kinarey.

== Early life ==
Azra was born in 1940 in Meerut, British India.

== Career ==
She began her career with the Rawalpindi Studios of PTV in the late 1960s.

Sherwani worked with some of the best producers in the country including Mohsin Ali, Shereen Khan, Shahzad Khalil, Sultana Siddiqui, Zaheer Khan and Sahira Kazmi. She also worked with some of the best writers of her time including Fatima Surayya Bajia, Haseena Moin and Anwar Maqsood.

The role of Apa Begum in Haseena Moin's Tanhaiyaan was undoubtedly the most famous of her career where Shahzad Khalil cast her as a tough taskmaster who ill-treated her employee, Buqrat, played by Jamshed Ansari. She logically argued with him (and won in the end, of course) on matters such as why he should not get bus fare from his employer when walking can improve his health and solve the problem. Her character wanted her brother (Qazi Wajid as Faraan) to marry a dominant woman which, fortunately, does not happen.

As Ghazi Apa in Uncle Urfi, she stood between the two lovebirds, quarrelled regularly with Hasnat Bhai (Jamshed Ansari again) and was the dominant force behind the extremely funny Shaheer Bhai (Qurban Jilani). In Sitara Aur Mehrunissa, she played the selfish mother of Sitara (Atiqa Odho) and in Aangan Terha, she played the despised mother-in-law aka Saliha Begum of Mahboob Ahmed (Shakeel).

Then she was the villainous Mai Jaina in Mera Naam Mangu in the early 1970s — a play about professional beggars — while she excelled in Haseena Moin's Parchaiyan as part of a star cast comprising Rahat Kazmi, Sahira Kazmi, Shakeel and Talat Hussain. She held her own in Bajiya's Afshan with fellow cast members Shafi Mohammad, Shakeel, Qazi Wajid, Ishrat Hashmi and Begum Khurshid Mirza. In short, her histrionic talent set the standards for character acting on Pakistan television.

Azra Sherwani worked with actors of all generations — from Qazi Wajid, Subhani Ba Yunus, Imtiaz Ahmed, Begum Khurshid Mirza, Qurban Jilani, Shakeel, Shafi Mohammad, Talat Iqbal, Anwar Maqsood, Akbar Subhan, Behroze Sabzwari, Shahnaz Sheikh, Marina Khan, Ishrat Hashmi, Jamshed Ansari, Babar Ali, Mazhar Ali, Mishi Khan, Atiqa Odho, Sania Saeed, Sajid Hasan and Sadia Imam.

When the advent of private productions brought about the decline of quality plays on PTV, Azra Sherwani sustained for some time, working in plays such as Kanwal, Fatima Surayya Bajia's Ghar Ik Nagar and Sultana Siddiqui's Doosri Duniya. Her most memorable role during the later part of her career was that of Khala Khairan in Riffat Humayun's serial of the same name. Her character was such that she quarrels with Qazi Wajid, a tenant in the house of Khala's folks who refuses to either leave or pay the rent.

== Personal life ==
Sherwani was born in Meerut, India, according to family sources. She married Nafees Sherwani, an Air Commodore in the Pakistan Air Force.

== Death ==
She died on 19 December 2005, in Oklahoma City, Oklahoma, United States.

== Filmography ==
=== Television series ===
- Uncle Urfi
- Raat Ki Roshni
- Parchaiyan
- Afshan
- Ana
- Akhri Chattan
- Tanhaiyaan
- Dhoop Kinarey
- Mera Naam Mangu
- Stolen
- Ghar Ik Nagar
- Aangan Terha
- Sherry and Jozy
- Janay Kyun
- Sitara Aur Mehrunissa
- Kanwal
- Aagahi
- Khala Khairan
- Doosri Dunya
