= Khalid Nizami =

Pakistani comic actor and music composer (1947–2026)

- خالد نظامی
- Born: 1947; Mussoorie, United Provinces, India
- Died: 29 July 2026 (aged 79); Karachi, Sindh, Pakistan
- Education: Karachi Grammar School; Islamia College University (BA)
- Occupations: Comedian, actor, music composer
- Years active: 1970–2026
- Known for: Comedy characters
- Notable work: Ankahi and composition of the song "Tum Sung Nainan Laagay"
- Television: Pakistan Television, Karachi center

Khalid Nizami (1947 – 29 July 2026) was a Pakistani comedic actor and music composer. He is primarily known for playing a comedy role in Haseena Moin's play Ankahi. He played several comedy characters in PTV dramas beginning in 1970. In 1973, he composed a song "Tum Sung Nainan Laagay" which was sung by Rubina Badar and became a classic hit. He also composed some songs for the singer A. Nayyar.

Nizami also acted in Haseena Moin's plays Eid Ka Jora and Shehzori (1974). He appeared in some Urdu films, including Nazar-ul-Islam's Haqeeqat (1974).

Nizami died after a long illness in Karachi, on 29 July 2026, at the age of 79.

== Television plays ==
- Uncle Urfi (1972)
- Shehzori (1974)
- Ankahi (1982)
- Hum Chale Aaye (2008)

== Film ==
- Haqeeqat (1974)
- Pehchan (1975)
- Aj Diyan Kurrian (1977)

== Songs ==
- Tum sung Nainan Laagay — Singer: Rubina Badar, Poet: Asad Muhammad Khan
