= Salma Zafar =

Pakistani actress

- Born: 10 August 1955 (age 71); Karachi, Pakistan
- Education: University of Karachi
- Occupations: Actress; Writer; Producer; Singer
- Years active: 1983 – present
- Spouse: Tariq Mehmood (Divorced)
- Children: 2
- Parent: Zafar Khursheed (father)

Salma Zafar is a Pakistani actress. She is known for her roles in dramas Yeh Zindagi Hai, Kaash Main Teri Beti Na Hoti, Humsafar and Zebaish.

== Early life ==
Salma was born on 10 August 1955 in Karachi, Pakistan. She completed her studies from University of Karachi.

== Career ==
Salma started her acting career in theater. She then appeared in dramas on PTV such as Aahat, Nijaat, Khala Kulsum Ka Kumba, Paadash, Bewafaiyan and Tumse Kehna Tha. She was noted for her role in drama Lyari Express on PTV. She also appeared in the drama Yeh Zindagi Hai and Yeh Zindagi Hai Season 2 as Saeeda which was the longest-running television series. Since then she has appeared in dramas Ghar Damad, Mera Kiya Qasoor, Aslam Bahi & Company, Rishtey Kachay Dhagoon Se and Bubbly Kya Chahti Hai.

== Personal ==
She was married to Tariq Mehmood for 22 years. They are divorced and have two daughters. Salma's father Zafar Khursheed was a music composer who composed tunes for advertisements Tullo Oil and Lipton Tea. Salma's father died in 1970s when she was young.

== Filmography ==
=== Television ===
Year	Title	Role	Network
1985	Paadash	Zubaida	PTV
1991	Aahat	Rajjo Masi	PTV
1991	Kohar	Shamin's mother	PTV
1993	Nijaat	Masi Taqdeera	PTV
1994	Aitraf	Police woman	PTV
1995	Tumse Kehna Tha	Shamim	PTV
1995	Bewafaiyan	Sumaiya	PTV
1996	Dada Girl	Mariam	PTV
1998	Eid Vs Mubarak	Tehreem	PTV
1998	Such Much	Maryam	PTV
2008	Lyari Express	Tabbasum	PTV
2008	Yeh Zindagi Hai	Saeeda	Geo TV
2009	Haroon To Piya Teri	Amara	PTV
2009	Yeh Kaisi Mohabbat Hai	Abida	Geo TV
2009	Aashti	Akila's mother	Hum TV
2010	Khala Kulsum Ka Kumba	Kulsum	PTV
2010	Thodi Dur Saath Chalo	Farah	Hum TV
2010	Mere Angney Main	Naima	Hum TV
2011	Kaash Main Teri Beti Na Hoti	Zulekha	Geo TV
2011	Mera Na Khuda Koi Nahi	Sohaila	PTV
2011	Sanjha	Shasta	Hum TV
2011	Humsafar	Sherish	Hum TV
2012	Mann Se Poocho	Momina	TV One
2012	Pak Villa	Sumaira	Geo TV
2013	Khelo Pyar Ki Bazi	Farheen	TV One
2013	Yeh Zindagi Hai Season 2	Saeeda	Geo TV
2014	Raayegaan	Bilquis	Express Entertainment
2014	Haal-e-Dil	Simmi's mother	ARY Digital
2015	Kaanch Ki Guriya	Tasneem	Geo TV
2015	Saas Bahu	Shehnaz	Geo Entertainment
2016	Aslam Bahi & Company	Salma Aapa	Express Entertainment
2017	Rishtey Kachay Dhagoon Se	Amna	A-Plus
2017	Bubbly Kya Chahti Hai	Jamila	ARY Digital
2018	Ghar Damad	Rani	PTV
2019	Mera Kiya Qasoor	Durdana	A-Plus
2019	Master Kitchen	Herself	Urdu 1
2020	Zebaish	Sania	Hum TV
2021	Jannat Chordi Meinay	Mariam's mother	SAB TV
2021	Paposh Nagar Ki Neelam	Amma Jan	Express Entertainment
2023	Ahsaas	Rajida	Express Entertainment
2023	Lyari Say Keamari	Shakila's mother	PTV
2023	Kancha Chowk	Sultana	Mun TV
2023	Mein Kahani Hun	Nazo	Express Entertainment
2024	Lawaris	Zartaj	Aur Life
2024	Main Kaun Hoon	Sunera's mother	SET Entertainment
2024	Radd	Khalida	ARY Digital
2026	Humrahi	Chanda	Geo Entertainment

=== Telefilm ===
Year	Title	Role
1998	Dada Giri	Amma
2006	Bhaid Bhaao	Sarah
2007	Ek Adhuri Si Maa	Guriya's mother
2007	Cactus's Flower	Maakhi
2014	Sudha Ki Kalha	Mamatin Gi
2016	Aashiq Colony	Mukhtara
2017	Uff Yeh Parosi	Fahmida
2018	Dil Pe Mat Le Yaa	Mumtaz
2022	Babar	Eunuch
2023	Mummy Jee	Mummy

=== Film ===
Year	Title	Role
2008	Jannat	Samina

== Awards and nominations ==
Year	Award	Category	Result	Title	Ref.
2008	7th Lux Style Awards	Best TV Actress Terrestrial	Nominated	Lyari Express	
