= Ankahi =

Urdu TV drama series

- Title screen
- Genre: Romance; Comedy
- Written by: Haseena Moin
- Directed by: Shoaib Mansoor; Mohsin Ali
- Starring: Shehnaz Sheikh; Shakeel; Javed Sheikh; Jamshed Ansari; Saleem Nasir; Qazi Wajid; Behroze Sabzwari; Badar Khalil
- Theme music composer: Arshad Mehmood
- Original language: Urdu

Production
- Running time: 50 minutes

Original release
- Network: Pakistan Television Corporation, Karachi
- Release: March 1982 – May 1982

Ankahi (Urdu: ان کہی, lit. 'The Unsaid') is a 1982 Pakistani Urdu television drama serial broadcast by PTV and is now considered a cult classic. It was written by Haseena Moin and directed by Shoaib Mansoor and Mohsin Ali.

The drama serial featured an ensemble star cast including Shehnaz Sheikh, Shakeel, Javed Sheikh, Saleem Nasir, Jamshed Ansari, Behroze Sabzwari, Badar Khalil, Qazi Wajid, Azra Mansoor, Khalid Nizami, Arshad Mehmood, Tabassum Farooqui, and Faisal Bilal. Ankahi was one of the most popular drama serials in the early 1980s in Pakistan.

This cast then went to work in a similar Pakistani drama serial, Tanhaiyaan, in 1986, which was also written by Haseena Moin. Ankahi is remembered for its witty dialogue and the candid role of Sana (Shehnaz Sheikh). The show was not only popular in Pakistan but across the border in India as well. In 2020, PTV Home retelecast it daily from 18 April to 2 May, in PTV GOLD Hour.

== Synopsis ==
The story revolves around a young, ambitious girl, Sana Murad (Shehnaz Sheikh). Due to her father's early death, her family is not so well-off, and she dreams of being rich and prosperous like her friend Sara (Misbah Khalid). Her younger brother Jibran has a hole in his heart, and they need money for his surgery as well. Hence she applies for a job at an office. She fails the job interview as she is a fresh graduate and lacks the experience and qualifications required, but on her way back, she meets the chairman, Mr. Siddiqui (Qazi Wajid), who offers her the job anyway. She begins working for the managing director of the company, Taimur Ahmad (Shakeel). Sana is extremely clumsy, irresponsible, and does not even know how to type or take dictations, which causes Taimur great problems and some hilarious situations for the viewers. At her friend Sara's wedding, her groom Sajjad's (Arshad Mehmood)'s best friend Faraz (Javed Sheikh) falls for Sana and starts following her everywhere. He even goes to her office and ends up getting a job there, only to be closer to Sana.

Meanwhile, her aunt Zakia (Badar Khalil) arrives from America with her son Moby (Behroze Sabzwari) for a visit. Since her mamu (Saleem Nasir) had written to her that they had become rich, they pretended to be rich even to the extent of convincing their neighbor Timmy (Jamshed Ansari) to act as their butler. After many hilarious antics, the truth is finally revealed, and Zakia decides to buy a big house for all to move in. Meanwhile, Moby falls in love with Marium (the daughter of their tenant). After Moby's insistence, Zakia accepts his marriage with Marium. Jibran becomes friends with Faraz, as he frequently comes to their house to see Sana. Sana's family starts liking Faraz, and Sajjad talks with them about the arrangement of Faraz's marriage with Sana. Jibran goes to the U.S. with his mother for a successful heart operation and returns.

Meanwhile, Sana gets close to Taimur, whose wife Abeer is in a coma, and he is looking for happiness with Sana. Taimur, however, accepts his own mistakes, and Sana, feeling guilty, resigns from the job. Taimur goes to her home to tell her that she should move on and comes to realize Faraz's love for Sana and tells her that there are 'unsaid' (Ankahi) things that he couldn't say to her and departs. Abeer dies during surgery, Sana & Faraz go to Taimur's home for condolences. Faraz leaves Taimur's home expecting Sana to go for Taimur but she unexpectedly wants to leave with him reassuring him of her consent for him.

== Themes and Personalities ==
Taimur is shown to be an introvert, a strong and silent guy who keeps his problems to himself. He finds happiness and joy in the form of Sana but thinks that she would be happier with Faraz. Faraz is the exact opposite of Taimur. He is an outgoing extrovert guy with a lot of confidence. He abruptly proposes to Sana on his birthday party but seeing her disgust pretends that the proposal was a joke just to save himself from embarrassment. Both Taimur and Faraz are well aware of their mutual love interest and of the whole situation but they remain civil towards each other. At one point, Faraz even tries to quit the firm because he is uneasy as Taimur is his boss but Taimur declines his resignation as he believes that they should keep their professional and personal lives separate.

The series explores themes of silent love, grief, sacrifice and loneliness. It also explores social and financial issues of urban Pakistan.

== Cast ==
- Shehnaz Sheikh as Sana Murad
- Faisal Bilal as Jibran Murad
- Shakeel as Taimoor Ahmad
- Javed Sheikh as Faraz Afridi
- Saleem Nasir as Shehryar
- Jamshed Ansari as Tameez ud din, Timmy
- Behroze Sabzwari as Moby
- Badar Khalil as Zakia Begum
- Qazi Wajid as Siddiqui Sahib
- Azra Mansoor as Apa Bi
- Tabassum Farooqi as Marya
- Khalid Nizami as Thoee
- Misbah Ishaaq as Saira
- Arshad Mehmood as Sajjad
- Hameed Wain as Chacha
- Ubaida Ansari as Nurse

== Accolades ==
Year	Award	Category	Result	Recipients and nominees	Ref.
1982	Nigar Award	Best TV Actress	Won	Shehnaz Sheikh	
1982	Nigar Award	Best Writer	Won	Haseena Moin	

== Adaptations ==
The teledrama was adapted into a Theater play titled Ankahi 2020 and premiered on 25 March 2020 at the Karachi Arts Council in which lead role of Sana Murad was played by Amna Ilyas.

2000's Bollywood movie Chal Mere Bhai, an unofficial remake of the serial, was loosely based on the series and had the same storyline as the serial. The movie even copies Frame to frame the famous tea scene between the two principal characters.
