= Durdana Butt =

Pakistani actress (1938–2021)

- دردانہ بٹ
- Born: 13 April 1938; Lahore, Punjab, British India
- Died: 12 August 2021 (aged 83); Karachi, Pakistan
- Education: Kinnaird College
- Occupations: Actress, model
- Years active: 1960 – 2021
- Spouse: Saeed Ahmed Khan
- Relatives: Maliha Anwar Khan (niece)
- Awards: Sitara-i-Imtiaz (2020); Pride of Performance (2022)

Durdana Butt (9 May 1938 – 12 August 2021) was a Pakistani actress known for her work on Pakistani television. She appeared in a few films as well.

Butt is best known for her portrayals in PTV's Fifty Fifty (1978), Aangan Terha (1980), and Tanhaiyaan (1985). For her contribution to the television, she was awarded the President's Sitara-e-Imtiaz, the third highest civil award in Pakistan, as well as the Presidential Pride of Performance.

== Early life ==
Durdana was born in Lahore, Punjab on 9 May 1938 into an ethnic Kashmiri family. She studied at Kinnaird College and later went to the University of Toledo, Ohio, where she completed PhD in educational administration.

== Career ==
She then went on to pursue acting where she worked in commercials and modeling, which she did briefly on PTV Channel. She started working in theater when a director gave her a role in a comedy drama. She accepted the role and earned praise for her natural acting and expressions. Soon after that she performed in many dramas on PTV Channel. In 1978 she had a role in the drama Fifty Fifty with Moin Akhtar. By the time the drama finished in 1984, she had become well known among the audience. In 1980 she had the role of Sultana Sahiba in the drama Aangan Terha, an emotional role for which she was praised. She was paired again with Moin Akhter in a comedy drama Naukar Ke Aage Chakar in 1982. In 1985 she was offered a role in the drama Tanhaiyaan which she accepted, appearing with Marina Khan, Shehnaz Sheikh and Badar Khalil. She had the role of Bibi, who is a motherly figure to the main protagonists who lose their parents in an accident. The drama was successful and she along with other cast members was recognized for her talent.

== Personal life ==
Durdana was married to her cousin, who died during the 1970s.

== Illness and death ==
Durdana Butt was on a ventilator for twelve days at a hospital in Karachi before she died from COVID-19 complications on 12 August 2021 during the COVID-19 pandemic in Pakistan.

== Filmography ==
=== Television ===
Year	Title	Role	Network
1975	Madan-e-Mohabbat	Begum	PTV
1978	Zindagi Bandgi	Bee Ji	PTV
1978	Fifty Fifty	Safia	PTV
1980	Aangan Terha	Sultana Sahiba	PTV
1981	Darwaza	Shela's mother	PTV
1982	Sona Chandi	Kako Dhoban	PTV
1982	Naukar Ke Aage Chakar	Tahira Begum	PTV
1983	Wadi-e-Purkhar	Sughra	PTV
1985	Tanhaiyaan	Bibi	PTV
1986	Khal Office Office	Aapa	PTV
1986	Show Time Boutique	Ms. Noor	PTV
1988	Hanstey Bastey	Begum Sahiba	PTV
1990	Kahani No: 10	Anjam's mother	PTV
1992	Nadan Nadia	Nasreen	PTV
1993	Eid Flight	Aapa	PTV
1993	Nijaat	Shafqat	PTV
1996	Pal Do Pal	Hameeda	PTV
1997	Anokhi	Rana's mother	PTV
1998	Such Much	Zareena	PTV
1998	Jinnah Se Quaid	Densha Petit	PTV
2008	Cousins	B.G	PTV
2008	Rani	Rani's mother	PTV
2011	Choti Si Kahani	Amma Bi	PTV
2011	Dugdugi	Ashraf's mother	ARY Digital
2011	Mera Naseeb	Nazia's Aunt	Hum TV
2011	Mohabbat Rooth Jaye Toh	Sister Veronica	Hum TV
2011	Phir Chand Pe Dastak	Masooma	Hum TV
2012	Tanhaiyan Naye Silsilay	Bibi	PTV
2012	Armaan	Rabbani	PTV
2014	Marium Kaisay Jiye	Javed's mother	ARY Zindagi
2015	Family Band	Dadi	ARY Digital
2016	Mazaaq Raat	Herself	Dunya News
2016	Intezaar	Zoya's grandmother	A-Plus
2017	Meray Chotay Mian	Ama Jaan	Express Entertainment
2017	Thori Si Wafa	Sameel's grandmother	Hum TV
2017	Begangi	Sundus	A-Plus
2017	Rani Nokrani	Shazia	Express Entertainment
2019	The Shareef Show Mubarak Ho	Herself	Geo TV
2019	Ruswai	Amma	ARY Digital

=== Telefilm ===
Year	Title	Role
1988	Eid Train	Rukhsana
2014	Dulha Mein Le Ke Jaungi	Farrukh's mother
2014	Papar Se Pizza Tak	Sweetie
2018	Dil Diyan Gallan	Raniya's grandmother
2019	Bahu Rani Saas Sayani	Dadi
2021	Doly From Mianwali	Zain's grandmother

=== Film ===
Year	Title	Role
2016	Hijrat	Nani
2016	Ishq Positive	Rajjo's mother
2017	Balu Mahi	Balu's grandmother
2019	Dry Leaves	Farhat Ul Ain
2019	Parey Hut Love	Amma Jaan

== Tribute and honour ==
The Arts Council of Pakistan Karachi held a tribute in her memory. Theatre artist and writer Kulsoom Aftab described her as a person who brought smiles to people's faces and in the ceremony Imran Shirvanee, Misbah Khalid, and Zaheer Khan were present to acknowledge her contribution to Pakistani dramas for four decades. The Government of Pakistan named a street and intersection after her in Lahore on August 16, 2021.

== Awards and recognition ==
Year	Award	Category	Result	Title	Ref.
1985	PTV Award	Best Actress	Won	Tanhaiyaan	
1986	6th PTV Awards	Best Actress	Won	Khal Office Office	
2018	17th Lux Style Awards	Best Supporting Actress	Nominated	Balu Mahi	
2020	Sitara-i-Imtiaz	Award by the President of Pakistan	Won	Herself	
2022	Pride of Performance	Award by the President of Pakistan	Won	Herself	
