= Parosi =

Pakistani TV serial

- Title screen
- Created by: Haseena Moin
- Written by: Haseena Moin
- Directed by: Raana Sheikh
- Starring: Khalida Riyasat; Marina Khan; Badar Khalil; Ali Ejaz; Saleem Sheikh; Jamal Shah; Shamim Hilaly
- Theme music composer: Arshad Mehmood
- Country of origin: Pakistan
- Original language: Urdu
- No. of episodes: 13

Production
- Running time: 56–60 min

Original release
- Network: NTM
- Release: 1990 – 1991

Parosi (Urdu: پڑوسی, lit. 'Neighbour') is a 1990 Pakistani drama television series that aired on NTM. It was written by Haseena Moin and directed by Raana Sheikh. Filmed in Islamabad and Murree, it starred Khalida Riyasat, Marina Khan, Badar Khalil, Ali Ejaz, Saleem Sheikh and Jamal Shah. Parosi marked the last series of Riyasat, who died soon after working in the 1996 telefilm Ab Tum Ja Sakte Ho.

== Plot ==
Parosi tells the story of two sisters. Jahan Ara, who is a single parent as her husband left her for a wealthier woman, and Roshan Ara, who is much more mature and composed compared to her elder sister. They, along with Haryali Bua, come to live in a house they have rented from Shahnawaz, who is a very strict man living with his nephew Arsal. The comedy of errors starts as Jahan makes the life of her landlord miserable. Roshan Ara and Arsal fall in love.

== Cast ==
- Ali Ejaz as Shahnawaz Ali Khan, aka Agha Jani, the landlord and Arsal's uncle
- Khalida Riyasat as Jahan Ara, the middle sister; has a son, Ali, with ex-husband Malik Iqbal
- Marina Khan as Roshan Ara aka Munni, youngest of three sisters; she makes documentary films
- Badar Khalil as Haryali Bua; maidservant in the sisters' household.
- Saleem Sheikh as Arsal, nephew (sister's son) of Agha Jani.
- Jamal Shah as Malik Iqbal, Jehan Ara's husband
- Shamim Hilaly as Mrs. Asif (Bari Aapa), elder sister of Roshan Ara and Jehan Ara
- Begum Humyra K. Saiyid as Nani, maternal grandmother of the sisters
- Latif Sheikh as Chaudhry Rehmat Ullah
- Parveen Rasheed as Amma, mother of the sisters
- Sikander as Ali, Jehan Ara and Malik Iqbal's son
- Ali Ejaz as Sardar Meer, cook

== Reception ==
The series was shot in Murree and Islamabad and was well received by the audiences. It is considered to be one of Haseena Moin's best works, and was praised for its portrayal of female friendship. It featured the great actresses Khalida Riyasat and Marina Khan and it was a treat for the viewers to watch both of them perform together. The show has had several reruns on TV and its DVDs are still in demand.

== Soundtrack ==
Parosi

Soundtrack album by Ali Haider, Mehnaz
- Genre: Theme song
- Length: 8:08
- Language: Urdu
- Producer: NTM

Parosi's soundtrack featured two songs. One was a ghazal called Abhi Kuch Din Lagen Ge sung by Nayyara Noor with poetry by Iftikhar Arif. The second song was called Ga Raha Tha Koi sung by Ali Haider with poetry by Nasir Kazmi. Both were composed by Arshad Mehmood, and are frequently used during the show.

Tracklist
| No. | Title | Singer(s) | Length |
|---|---|---|---|
| 1. | "Abhi Kuch Din Lagen Ge" | Nayyara Noor | 4:00 |
| 2. | "Ga Raha Tha Koi" | Ali Haider | 4:08 |

== See also ==
- Network Television Marketing
