= Dhoop Kinare =

Pakistani television series

- Dhoop Kinare logo
- دھوپ کنارے
- Genre: Medical Drama; Classic
- Created by: Haseena Moin
- Directed by: Sahira Kazmi
- Starring: Rahat Kazmi; Marina Khan; Badar Khalil; Sajid Hassan; Kehkashan Awan; Qazi Wajid; Azra Sherwani; Ishrat Hashmi; Hameed Wain
- Country of origin: Pakistan
- No. of episodes: 13

Production
- Running time: 50 min

Original release
- Network: PTV Karachi
- Release: January 27 – May 19, 1987

Dhoop Kinare (Urdu: دھوپ کنارے, lit. 'at the edge of sunshine') is a Pakistani television series broadcast on PTV in 1987 and is considered one of the all-time favourite TV shows in Pakistan. The show centers on a team of doctors at a hospital in Karachi and revolves around their routines at the hospital and their private lives. The show starred Rahat Kazmi and Marina Khan in lead roles, was directed by Sahira Kazmi and written by Haseena Moin.

Title screen for Dhoop Kinare

In the early days of PTV, drama serials were usually applauded for being richly diverse in their plots and direction. They were appreciated in Pakistan and their quality content was cherished in neighbouring India as well. A long list of such dramas may usually include Dhoop Kinare. The serial has successfully retained its appeals for two decades amid numerous re-runs. This serial is said to have promoted the careers of Rahat Kazmi and Marina Khan as the most-sought-after stars in the Pakistani television industry.

== Characters ==
=== Dr Ahmer Ansari ===
Rahat Kazmi as Dr Ahmer Ansari in Dhoop Kinare. This role made him as one of the most promising and prominent stars in the Pakistani television industry.

Dr. Ahmer Ansari (Rahat Kazmi) is bereaving the death of his foster father (played by Arshad Mehmood) whom he calls Baba (an affectionate word for father in Urdu). He vaguely remembers that the professor had adopted him as a child but has no knowledge that his father had a daughter who died young and that she also gave birth to a girl who lives somewhere in the same city. His father had never shared his past with Ahmer. Ahmer was led to believe that he was the sole beneficiary of his baba's love and affection.

In his will, Ahmer's father (Baba) leaves everything but the house to Ahmer. Baba gifts the house to his granddaughter, whom he never met. Ahmer, while trying to reminisce about his encounters with his father (shown in flashback sequences), gathers the true understanding of the dual meaning conversations with his father. He is upset over the turn of events as he feels let down by his adopted father. He feels that the house he was in, the memories he made were now shattered as this house meant more than anything to Ahmer (due to sentimental purposes). Once again he feels alone and rejected. Previously happy and cheerful, he becomes reticent and reserved.

Throughout the first few episodes, Dr. Ahmer cannot come to terms with the death of his foster father and the sudden emergence of Baba's granddaughter who now owns the house where he spent his entire life. Upon repeated visits to the house Ahmer finds the new owner to be negligent towards the maintenance of the property. It angers him to see his father's house in disrepair. Through his lawyer, he makes many attempts to buy the house from the current owners but is always rejected. Incidentally, the same girl appears in his hospital as an intern. While he does not know who she is, he finds her to be quite immature and careless. He tries to instil professionalism in her and is often seen criticising and educating her which she finds frustrating. After an incident occurring due to the intern: Dr Zoya Khan's mistake, Zoya begins to take interest in her profession and Dr Ahmer and she become friends which in turn helps him relax. Soon they develop stronger feelings for each other. However, one day when the house is sold upon the request of Zoya due to her father's business being in debt, Dr Ahmer finds out who Zoya really is when he takes her to show his father's house. He refuses to talk to her and also rejects the idea of buying the house. However, when Dr. Ahmer finds out that they are in desperate need of money, he goes through with the transaction but decides to gift the house to Zoya anyway. In order to get away from Zoya, Dr Ahmer takes a leave from work and decides to leave Pakistan. However, his feelings for Zoya are genuine and he soon finds himself at his Baba's house only to find Zoya waiting for him. They reunite for a beautiful conclusion to a memorable show.

=== Dr Zoya Ali Khan ===
Marina Khan as Dr Zoya Ali Khan in the serial Dhoop Kinare. Her carefree attitude and short hair made her into an iconic symbol in Pakistani television.

Dr Zoya Ali Khan (Marina Khan) is a cheerful young doctor who brings joy to the mundane life at the hospital and in the life of Ahmer. Although her carefree attitude leaves no other choice for Ahmer but to educate her by strict behaviour as he believes a doctor's life demands more seriousness than what Zoya demonstrates.

The serial starts with a young Zoya trying hard to convince her father (Qazi Wajid) for not attending the medical school; she instead learns that her dead mother wanted her to be a doctor. A phone call that her father attends gives her the much-needed cheer for the day when the person on the other end explains that she just inherited a house that belonged to her grandfather.

Seeing that her father wants her to become a doctor to celebrate her dead mother's wishes, she takes admission in a medical school. She retains her carefree antics in the seriousness of the hospital life and comes in critique of Ahmer.

=== Dr. Sheena Karamat ===
Badar Khalil plays this character very well. She wants to get close to Dr. Ahmer but he doesn't consider her more than a good friend. When she notices Dr. Ahmer's interest in Zoya, she becomes jealous and gives Zoya a hard time. Later, she meets her old college friend Nasir Jamal (Rizwan Wasti) and marries him but finds out that he already has another wife and children. She gets a divorce from him only to return to Ahmer but realizes that he never felt the same way for her, harboring only platonic feelings.

=== Dr. Irfan ===
Sajid Hassan plays this character beautifully. He is a junior colleague of Dr. Ahmer and works as the administrator of the children ward. He is carefree and has a humorous personality and flirtatious nature. He is a good friend of both Dr Khan and Dr Sheena which leaves him in an uncomfortable position seeing that both women are in love with the same man. He also harbours a crush on Sheena. He decides to help Zoya and Ahmer get together as her feelings are more genuine unlike Dr Sheena's obsessive and materialistic nature. After meeting Anji, Zoya's best friend, he flirts with her and soon falls for her and after much drama and chaos that came with convincing Anji's father, they become engaged.

=== Anji ===
Kehkashan Awan plays Anji, Zoya's best friend since childhood. She lives in a house next to Zoya. In later episodes, she gets engaged to Dr. Irfan (Sajid Hassan) who is a junior colleague of Dr Ahmer. Time and again she proves how good of a friend she is to Zoya by always remaining genuine to her no matter what. She is passionate about pursuing interior designing but can't do so because of her father who wants her to take upon the family business instead.

=== Zoya's father ===
Qazi Wajid plays the role of Zoya's "Baba" who is very close with her and raised her like a friend. He believes in letting the kids grow by learning from their own experiences of life while supporting and advising them when in need.

=== Fazeelat Bibi ===
Azra Sherwani plays Fazeelat who is Zoya's caretaker and is not happy with Zoya always being at the hospital without having rest. Zoya calls her Fazee. She is very loud and has a harsh outlook on everything and everyone.

=== Mummy ===
Ishrat Hashmi plays Anji's mother

=== Daddy ===
Hameed Wain plays a very strict father of Anji. He forces his daughter into working with him in his office rather than pursuing interior designing.

=== Ahmer's father ===
Arshad Mehmood plays the role of Dr. Ahmer Ansari's foster father. He appears in dream sequences from Dr. Ahmer's past.

== Cast ==
- Rahat Kazmi as Dr. Ahmer Ansari
- Marina Khan as Dr. Zoya Ali Khan
- Badar Khalil as Dr. Sheena Karamat
- Sajid Hassan as Dr. Irfan
- Kehkashan Awan as Anji
- Qazi Wajid as Baba
- Azra Sherwani as Fazeelat
- Ishrat Hashmi as Mummy
- Hameed Wain as Daddy
- Arshad Mehmood as Ahmer's father
- Rizwan Wasti as Nasir Jamal
- Ghazal Siddique as Ghazal
- Huma Mir as Sharmeen

== Soundtrack ==
Dhoop KInaray

Soundtrack album by Nayyara Noor
- Genre: Theme song
- Length: 10:42
- Language: Urdu
- Producer: Sahira Kazmi

The music of the drama serial was directed by Arshad Mehmood and some of the ghazals were performed by Nayyara Noor including "Main Tum Se Na Puchun", "Raat Yun Dil Mein Teri" and "Hansi Khanakti Hui" (the theme song).

Tracklist
No.	Title	Singer(s)	Length
1.	"Hansi Khanakti Hui"	Nayyara Noor	4:37
2.	"Raat Yun Dil Main Teri"	Nayyara Noor	2:00
3.	"Main Tum Se Na Puchun"	Nayyara Noor	4:05

== Production ==
During production, Dhoop Kinare faced financial constraints, with lead actor Sajid Hassan, receiving no payment.

== Accolades ==
Year	Award	Category	Result	Recipients and nominees	Ref.
1987	Nigar Award	Best Producer	Won	Sahira Kazmi	
1987	Nigar Award	Best Writer	Won	Haseena Moin	
1987	Nigar Award	Best Actor	Won	Rahat Kazmi	
2022	PTV Award	Best Director	Won	Sahira Kazmi	
2022	PTV Award	Best Actress	Won	Marina Khan	
2022	PTV Award	Best Composer	Won	Arshad Mehmood	
2022	PTV Award	Best Actress	Won	Kehkashan Awan	

== Broadcast and adaption ==
The teledrama was aired in India on SET India. Dhoop Kinare is scheduled to air in Saudi Arabia in the summer of 2020.

PTV Home re-ran the serial after a long time from 3 May 2020 to 15 May 2020 daily at 12:00pm in the segment PTV Gold Hour.

In India, the show was remade by Sony Entertainment Television India as Kuch Toh Log Kahenge. It started on 3 October 2011 and had total of 346 episodes.
