= Tum Se Kehna Tha (1995 TV series) =

Pakistani television series

- Based on: While You Were Sleeping by Jon Turteltaub
- Written by: Syed Mohammad Ahmed
- Directed by: Sahira Kazmi
- Starring: Marina Khan; Ali Haider; Farhan Ally Agha
- Country of origin: Pakistan
- Original language: Urdu
- No. of episodes: 15

Production
- Producer: Sahira Kazmi

Original release
- Network: PTV
- Release: 1995 – 1995

Tum Se Kehna Tha (Urdu: تم سے کہنا تھا, lit. 'I Needed to Tell You') is a Pakistani television series first broadcast in 1995 on PTV. It was directed by Sahira Kazmi. The series was based on the Hollywood film While You Were Sleeping and adapted by Syed Mohammad Ahmed for the screenplay, which marked his debut as a screenwriter. The series stars Marina Khan, Ali Haider and Farhan Ally Agha in main roles.

== Cast ==
- Marina Khan as Hira
- Ali Haider as Bilal
- Farhan Ally Agha as Saad
- Badar Khalil as Daadi
- Salma Zafar as Shamim
- Manzoor Qureshi as Sajjad
- Seemi Pasha as Meher
- Khawaja Akmal as Shams
- Nasreen Baqir as Bibi
- Capt. Sharif as Agha
- Nadeem Jafery as Gringo
- Umer Khalil as Hamza
- Najma Khatoon as Buwa
- Meena Naqvi as Seema
- Nashmia Ahmad as Amna

== Production ==
The series was adapted from the 1995 Hollywood film While You Were Sleeping, starring Bill Pullman and Sandra Bullock. It marked Marina Khan's first collaboration with Ahmed. She later directed his scripts such as Tum Hi Tou Ho (2002) and Azar Ki Ayegi Baraat (2009).
