= Uncle Urfi =

Pakistani television series

- Title screen
- Genre: Romance, Comedy, Tragedy
- Created by: Haseena Moin
- Written by: Haseena Moin
- Directed by: Mohsin Ali and Shirin Khan
- Starring: Shakeel; Shahla Ahmad; Begum Khurshid Mirza; Azra Sherwani; Khursheed Shahid; Qurban Jilani; Jamshed Ansari; Akbar Subhani; Ishrat Hashmi; Khalid Nizami; Nahid Rafiq
- Country of origin: Pakistan
- Original language: Urdu
- No. of episodes: 26

Production
- Producers: Shirin Khan, Mohsin Ali
- Production location: Pakistan
- Running time: 30 minutes (excluding commercials)

Original release
- Network: Pakistan Television Corporation
- Release: 1972 – September 1972

Uncle Urfi is a Pakistan Television Corporation (PTV) serial drama which first aired in 1972.

It had such a powerful appeal for viewers of all age groups that it turned into an instant hit. The 26-episode (each with a run-time of 30 minutes) serial was telecast once a week by PTV.

It was written by Haseena Moin and directed by Mohsin Ali and Shirin Vaqar Azim. The lead role was played by Shakeel as Uncle Urfi — a Pakistani expatriate in Canada who returns to Pakistan — and the character of Beena, the heroine, was performed by Shahla Ahmad. The supporting character of Hasnat, played by Jamshed Ansari, with his penknife, became popular.

== Synopsis ==
As the story goes, Shakeel, who is smartly dubbed as Uncle Urfi, takes interest in Beena. In reality, Uncle Urfi wishes to make Beena happy. Logically, Urfi should have taken Beena into confidence before doing her a favor. Instead, he kept her in the dark. The final moments of the last episode are fraught with pain and pathos.

Urfi tells Beena with certitude, hamari shadi hogi to sara zamana deikhey ga. To which poor Beena replies, kuchh shadiyaan dil kay weerano mein bhi to ho jaati hain, sirif khuda gawah hota hai.

The emotionally charged conclusion of Uncle Urfi, was so unexpected that literally nobody was prepared for it. Indeed, Haseena Moin had instilled so much despair in its dialogues that thirty-two years later in 2004, it still stands as a classic in its bittersweet illustration of the unbreakable bond of family.

== Cast ==
- Shakeel as Irfanuddin Ahmed also known as Uncle Urfi (Guardian of Afsheen)
- Shahla Ahmad as Beena, Uncle Urfi's love interest
- Nahid Rafique as Afsheen (Uncle Urfi's friend's daughter)
- Azra Sherwani as Ghazi Aapa, sister of Uncle Urfi
- Khursheed Shahid as Flight attendant
- Qurban Jillani as Manzoor Uncle/Shaheed Bhai, brother-in-law of Uncle Urfi
- Jamshed Ansari as Hasnat Ahmed, cousin of Afsheen
- Begum Khurshid Mirza as Amma Bi, the mother of Manzoor Uncle
- Akbar Subhani as Mansoor, the son of Ghazi Apa and Shaheed Bhai
- Rehana Parveen as Azra, the daughter of Ghazi Apa and Shaheed Bhai
- Ishrat Hashmi as Afsheen's aunt
- Subhani ba Yunus as Afsheen's uncle
- Imtiaz Ahmed as Beena's father, Abrar
- Qaiser Naqvi as Beena's mother
- Khalid Nizami as head of Uncle Urfi's household
- Syed Zahid Ali as Uncle Urfi's secretary
- Raju Jamil (Zulqarnain Jamil Aali son of Jamiluddin Aali in real life) as Police Inspector in episode 2 and as Zafar in episode 5/6
- Mushtaq Ahmed as Zuby's Daddy
- Salma Aziz as Zuby
- Zafar Masood as Javed
- S. M. Saleem as Baray Mian
- Khurshid Talat as Ambreen
- Khurshed Ahmad as Jimmy
- Ghazala Malik as Air Hostess 1
- Naseem Aziz as Air Hostess 2
- Rafat Jamil as Flight Steward
- Tayyab Ali as Doctor
- Rafiq Ahmad as officer
- Sikandar Hayat as the mulaazim
- Shehnaz Ismail as Fazeelat/Fuzzy (who Uncle Urfi referred to as "khatoon"
- Mehboob as Dada Jaan
