= Parchaiyan (Pakistani TV series) =

Pakistani television series

- Title screen
- Genre: Tragedy; Romance
- Written by: Haseena Moin
- Directed by: Mohsin Ali and Shirin Khan
- Starring: Rahat Kazmi; Sahira Kazmi; Talat Hussain; Begum Khurshid Mirza; Shakeel; Azra Sherwani; Khursheed Shahid
- Country of origin: Pakistan
- Original language: Urdu
- No. of episodes: 13

Production
- Running time: 50–60 mins

Original release
- Network: PTV
- Release: 1976

Parchaiyan (Urdu: پرچھائیاں, lit. 'Shadows') is a 1976 Pakistani drama television series presented by the PTV network. It was the first Pakistani drama series in colour.

Parchaiyan was an adaptation of the Henry James novel The Portrait of a Lady. It was translated and adapted by the writer Haseena Moin and directed by Mohsin Ali and Shirin Khan.

The ensemble cast featured Rahat Kazmi, Sahira Kazmi, Shakeel, Talat Hussain, Khursheed Shahid, Azra Sherwani, Begum Khurshid Mirza, Lubna Aslam and Mohammad Yousaf.

== Plot ==
The story revolves around Nazia (Sahira Kazmi) and the men in her life. After Nazia's parents pass away, her mother's sister takes her to her house where she encounters her cousin Adeel (Rahat Kazmi) and his friend Masood (Shakeel). Due to her dynamic personality and beauty, Masood instantly falls for her and shows his intentions to marry her but Nazia refuses. On the other hand, she is not aware of the love Adeel has in his heart for her. Through a distant acquaintance of the family, she is introduced to Shiraz (Talat Hussain) who wins her hand despite the fact that he is only interested in her money. When Nazia finally leaves Shiraz to return to Adeel, who has blood cancer, she finds that he is on the verge of death.

== Cast ==
- Sahira Kazmi as Najia
- Rahat Kazmi as Adeel
- Shakeel as Masood
- Khursheed Shahid as Begum Sahiba
- Talat Hussain as Shiraz
- Begum Khurshid Mirza as Ani
- Azra Sherwani as Begum Jan
- Lubna Aslam as Gul
- Mehar Rizvi as Begum Kishwar
- Mohammad Yousaf as Baba
- Javed Sheikh as Nasir
- Azra Mansoor as Aapa
- Iqbal Sherwani as Bhai Jan
