= Aahat (Pakistani TV series) =

Pakistani television series

- DVD cover for Aahat
- Original title: آہٹ
- Written by: Haseena Moin
- Directed by: Sahira Kazmi
- Starring: Sania Saeed; Salman Ahmed; Samina Ahmed; Huma Nawab
- Country of origin: Pakistan
- Original language: Urdu
- No. of episodes: 7

Production
- Producer: Sahira Kazmi
- Camera setup: Multi-camera

Original release
- Network: PTV
- Release: 1991 – 1992

Aahat (Urdu: آہٹ) is a Pakistani television series first broadcast on Pakistan Television Corporation. It was written by Haseena Moin and directed and produced by Sahira Kazmi. The seven-episode series starred Sania Saeed, Salman Ahmad, and Samina Ahmad in leading roles, and ran from 1991 to 1992. The series addresses the subject of family planning.

== Plot ==
The series follows a married couple who aspire to a happy family life while each pursuing personal ambitions. After marriage, they face mounting difficulties as their family grows, with societal pressure to produce a male child driving them to have successive children.

== Cast ==
- Sania Saeed as Rabya
- Salman Ahmad as Amir
- Samina Ahmed as Bushra, Amir's mother
- Huma Nawab as Fouzia
- Qazi Wajid as Anwar
- Talat Naseer as Naheed
- Jahanara Hai as Naheed's mother
- Salma Zafar as Rajjo Masi
- Sabiha Hashmi as Principal
- Ahmad Kapadia as Daniyal
- Ubaida Ansari as Doctor Sahiba
- Nabeela Isfahani as Saba
- Zahra Malik as Meena
- Imtiaz Taj as Rajjo's husband
- Anam as Guriya
- Tasneem Rana as Bibi Janti
- Shan Shirazi as Nashi
- Masood Zia as Driver

== Production ==
=== Casting ===
According to Saeed, she was cast in the series on the basis of her personal understanding of the difficulties depicted, rather than her acting credentials alone. Before joining the production, Saeed had been working as an announcer at Network Television Marketing.

=== Broadcast ===
An Arabic-dubbed version of the series was broadcast in Saudi Arabia.
