= Tanhaiyaan =

Pakistani TV series

- The opening title screen
- Genre: Family drama Classic
- Written by: Haseena Moin
- Directed by: Shahzad Khalil
- Starring: Shehnaz Sheikh; Marina Khan; Asif Raza Mir; Badar Khalil; Behroze Sabzwari; Azra Sherwani; Qazi Wajid; Durdana Butt; (For entire cast see the section of cast)
- Country of origin: Pakistan
- Original language: Urdu

Production
- Production company: Shalimar Recording Company (SRC)

Original release
- Network: Pakistan Television Corporation (PTV)
- Release: 1985

Related
- Tanhaiyan Naye Silsilay

Tanhaiyaan (Urdu: تنہائیاں, English: The loneliness) is a 1986 Pakistani drama serial which is now considered a cult classic. Tanhaiyan Naye Silsilay, telecast in 2012, is a sequel to the 27-year-old serial Tanhaiyaan.

The drama serial was directed by the legendary Shahzad Khalil and written by famous drama writer Haseena Moin. Tanhaiyan featured an ensemble star cast of veterans such as Shehnaz Sheikh, Marina Khan, Asif Raza Mir, Badar Khalil, Behroze Sabzwari, Azra Sherwani, Qazi Wajid, Durdana Butt, Yasmeen Ismail, Jamshed Ansari, Amir Hatmi, Subhani Ba Younus and Sultana Zafar.

Tanhaiyaan is the story of two sisters who lose their parents and with them their affluent and carefree life and go to live with their aunt. Their efforts to buy back their parents' house lead them to realise what makes a house a home.

== Plot ==
Two sisters Zara (Shehnaz Sheikh) and Sanya (Marina Khan) go to Karachi to visit their maternal aunt Zubi (Badar Khalil) while their parents, back home, meet with an unfortunate car accident and die. After their death, the girls find out that their father was heavily in debt and they have to sell all their assets including their house which their father had so lovingly built. All their friends turn their backs on them and they move in with their aunt Zubi.

In Karachi, while Sanya tries to adjust to their new life, Zara becomes obsessed with the idea to re-buy their house. She begins the pursuit to become rich. Here Saad Salman (Amir Hatmi) becomes her partner and together they start a garment factory. Sanya, on the other hand, soon befriends their landlord Faraan (Qazi Wajid) and becomes a humorous pain for his secretary Qutbutdin (Behroze Sabzwari) whom she calls Qabacha. Faraan has a sister Apa Begum (Azra Sherwani) who lives in another house with her trusted servant Buqrat (Jamshed Ansari). Apa Begum and Sanya are very keen on getting Faraan married and he impulsively proposes to Zubi.

Zain (Asif Raza Mir), Zara's childhood friend, after a long awaited reunion, runs into Zara. Zara asks Zain's fiancée Vida (Yasmeen Ismail) to join her factory as a designer and the two collaborate to start making brilliant designs which become very popular. However, Zara's quest for her house takes her away from her family, especially from her sister Sanya who feels neglected. Saad Salman proposes to Zara and even though the family disapproves, Zara finds herself in a dilemma.

Finally Zara's dream comes true and she gets enough money to buy back her house. She goes to Lahore and finalizes the deal. However, when she enters her house, she is haunted by the memories of her past and all the love that she has lost during these years. In a flash, she realizes what she has achieved is an empty house, and in the process has distanced her family. Loneliness consumes her and makes her run out of the house, terrified, and meet an accident.

Zara awakens to find her family close by but without the ability to speak or move. Initially, the doctors explain that it might be due to her spinal injuries. Later on, doctors say that she has gone into shock and does not have the will to live; there is nothing wrong physically with her. It is implied to the viewer that she has lost the will to struggle as she realizes that she has pushed everyone away from her in pursuit of what she thought was important and was all alone when what should have been her biggest triumph of finally buying the parents' house back. Saad, her fiancé, prefers to have a very strong, smart and pretty wife to project success in life. Saad becomes unsure about Zara after her accident as the doctors are skeptical about her recovery. Zara notices that Saad has lost interest in her and decides to return the engagement ring, which she eventually throws away in the garbage. Saad leaves Pakistan and travels abroad. Zara's family try to reassure her regarding the love and affection they have for her. During this time, Zain is shown to be very concerned for Zara's well-being. The closeness between Zara and Zain disturbs Vida (his fiancée); Zain's father senses this and insists that Zain marries Vida as he had promised her parents a long time back. Zain agrees to his father's wishes. Zain then meets Zara and tells her that he has to leave Pakistan and go to Canada after marrying Vida, and he wants to see Zara up and about before that. Upon hearing this, Zara takes hesitant steps and is able to walk. An overjoyed Zain recounts this to Vida, who comments that he must be the happiest man on earth. She tells him that she is happy for him and urges him to see clearly as he is madly in love with Zara. She tells him that she has explained the whole situation to Zain's father and would be flying off to Canada alone.

The last sequence shows Zara sitting alone in a party surrounded by friends and family as if waiting for somebody; suddenly the sounds and surroundings dim as Zain walks in. They have an unspoken conversation across the room when she tells that she had been waiting long for him and where he had gone all this time? He is shown expressing that he was and always will be with her. In a quick transition, the music and surroundings come back into focus with every body crowding in a loud cheer around them. Zara finally fills the void of loneliness (Tanhaiyaan).

== Cast and characters ==
- Shehnaz Sheikh as Zara: She starts off as the quiet type but is later revealed to be quiet sensitive. She starts a business to buy her house back and in doing that, drifts away from her family and friends. While visiting her ancestral house after buying it back, she is overcome by haunting memories and runs away and get hit by a car, injured badly, goes into a coma and wakes up paralyzed.
- Marina Khan as Sanya: She is lively, lazy, loud, materialistic but sensitive. She plays many pranks on others, mainly Qutbudin, whom she calls Qabacha.
- Asif Raza Mir as Zain: The sisters' childhood friend. Initially, the fiancée of Vida, but later falls in love with Zara. Is very social and lively. Respects and cares much for his father (Abba).
- Badar Khalil as Aani: She is the sisters' maternal aunt and takes them in when their parents die. A strict teacher by profession, she is also very social. She eventually marries Faraan.
- Behroze Sabzwari as Qutbuddin (Qabacha): This was perceived as a character not-often-found in society, though intelligent, he was an introvert and dry and is the victim of most of Sanya's pranks, getting the nickname "Qabacha" as an insult. Eventually he falls in love with Sanya and instead enjoys her attempts to annoy him. He takes advice from Buqrat and tries to follow that advice but always fails to execute it.
- Azra Sherwani as Aapa Begum: She is a very strict miser and feared by all, including her brother Farhan.
- Qazi Wajid as Faraan: He is a very easy-going, intellectual businessman. Fears his sister, and marries Aani to avoid marrying a girl he dislikes that Aapa-begum arranged for him to marry.
- Durdana Butt as Bibi: Aaya (mother-like figure) to Zara and Sanya. She creates humor in the house.
- Yasmeen Ismail as Vida: Initially, the fiancée of Zain. She also helped Zara in her business.
- Jamshed Ansari as Buqrat (Named after Hippocrates and taken as a spoof of Socrates): He is Aapa Begam's trusted servant. He is very intelligent and gives Qabacha many ideas on how to make Sanya fall for him.
- Imtiaz Ahmed as Baba: He is Aani's trusted servant. He works various chores around the house such as gardening, cleaning and driver. He and Bibi create humor in house.
- Amir Hatmi as Saad Salman: Initially, the fiancée of Zara and her business partner. Runs away by the fear of not receiving the divine wife.
- Subhani ba Yunus as Zara and Sanya's father: A loving and caring man. He died in an accident en route to the airport.
- Sultana Zafar as Zara and Sanya's mother: A strict mother. She died in the same accident above en route to the airport.

== Music ==
Arshad Mehmood composed the background music for this drama serial.

== Accolades ==
Year	Award	Category	Result	Recipients and nominees	Ref.
1986	Nigar Award	Best Actress	Won	Marina Khan	
1986	Nigar Award	Best Producer	Won	Shahzad Khalil	

== Broadcast and sequel ==
It has re-run several times on PTV and other TV channels, due to its popularity. The series also aired in the United Kingdom on BBC2 in 1992.

In 2020, the show was rebroadcast by PTV Home from 5 April to 17 April daily at 03:00pm under the segment PTV Gold Hour.

After 27 years, a sequel named Tanhaiyan Naye Silsilay was broadcast by PTV Home and ARY Digital. It started to air on every Saturday 08:00pm from 20 October 2012. The script was co-written by Haseena Moin and Mohammad Ahmed. The plot is about gaps in relations developed over the years in lives of characters owing to events they faced and how, going forward, things change for the better. Directed by Marina Khan, six of the 16 original cast members reprises their roles as Shehnaz Sheikh (the female lead in the original) has quit acting and the rest have since died. New cast members include Alishba Yousuf and Shehryar Munawar Siddiqui in lead roles while Syra Yousuf and Shehroz Sabzwari in supporting roles.
