= Hamid Mian Ke Haan =

Hamid Mian Ke Haan (Urdu: حامد میاں کے ہاں) was a popular weekly radio program on Radio Pakistan. The program began in 1950 and was aired on Sunday mornings, though it was later moved to Friday mornings and renamed Hamid Manzil.

Hamid Mian Ke Haan had one of the longest-runs of any Pakistani radio show. Several Pakistani artistes gained greater public recognition through their performances on the show, such as Mahmood Ali (who played the role of Ehsaan Mian, the younger brother of the main protagonist, Hamid Mian).
