= Fauzia Wahab =

Pakistani politician

Fauzia Wahab فوزیہ وہاب

Chairman of the Standing Committee of the National Assembly on Finance and Revenue
- In office 6 March 2008 – 17 June 2012
- President: Asif Ali Zardari
- Prime Minister: Yousaf Raza Gillani
- Preceded by: Hina Rabbani Khar
- Succeeded by: Rubina Qaim Khani

Secretary Information of Pakistan Peoples Party
- In office 14 March 2009 – 17 June 2012
- Preceded by: Sherry Rehman
- Succeeded by: Qamar Zaman Kaira

Personal details
- Born: Fouzia Wahab; 14 November 1956 Karachi, Federal Capital Territory, Pakistan
- Died: 17 June 2012 (aged 55) Karachi, Sindh, Pakistan
- Citizenship: Pakistan
- Party: Pakistan Peoples Party
- Spouse(s): Athar Husain (1998–2012); Wahab Siddiqui (1978–1993)
- Children: Murtaza Wahab
- Education: University of Karachi (BA); National Defence University (MSc)
- Notable awards: Hilal-e-Imtiaz (2012)

Fauzia Wahab (Urdu: فوزیہ وہاب; 14 November 1956 – 17 June 2012) was a Pakistani politician who served as the senior ex officio member and the secretary-general of the central executive committee of the Pakistan Peoples Party.

A graduate from the Karachi University, she entered national politics in 1994 and successfully contested in 2002 general elections and again in 2008 general elections. She was notably appointed as the Secretary Information of the Pakistan Peoples Party (PPP) after the resignation of Sherry Rehman, and as well secured the chairmanship of the standing committee on finance and revenue in 2008. She was personally endorsed by President Asif Ali Zardari and became senior, high-ranking member of the central executive committee. Earning media notoriety on passing controversial comments on Raymond Davis incident in 2011, she was admitted at the local hospital for an elective gall bladder surgery on 24 May 2012 and died on Sunday, 17 June 2012.

== Personal life ==
=== Background ===
Wahab was born on 14 November 1956 as the eldest of four children. In 1978, she married Wahab Siddiqui, a journalist and, later, a television anchorman in political talk shows. For the next fourteen years, she was a housewife and had four children. She acted in Haseena Moin's drama serial Kohar as the cousin of the hero played by the model, Junaid Butt. The drama aired in 1991 and 1992 and was directed by M. Zaheer Khan. She would consider it her "favorite mistake". In February 1993, her husband died of a massive heart attack and her life took a new turn. She married cardiologist Athar Hussein in 1998. On 24 May 2012, she was admitted to hospital in Karachi and died on 17 June 2012.

== Political career ==
Wahab worked for the Pakistan Industrial and Commercial Leasing as a Marketing Manager between 1993 and 1996. She was nominated as Member Advisory Council of Karachi Metropolitan Corporation (KMC) in October 1994. Initially she was given charge of the Municipal Ward 59. She was also nominated as Chairman of the Information Committee of KMC.

Prime Minister Benazir Bhutto nominated her to become the Information Secretary of the women's wing of the PPP in Sindh, a position she held until early 2002. After the dissolution of the PPP government in November 1996, general elections were held in February 1997 in which she was nominated to contest the elections on NA-193, as a PPP candidate. The PPP lost the elections and was confined to the opposition benches in the subsequent National Assembly.

With cases established against the PPP leadership, a multi-pronged strategy was initiated by the party to defend its leadership. It included contesting cases in the courts and apprising international institutions about the conduct of these cases.

In 1998, Benazir Bhutto nominated Wahab to become the Central Coordinator of the Human Rights Cell with responsibility for corresponding with human rights organisations abroad. During the incarceration period of Benazir Bhutto and Asif Ali Zardari, she wrote on various pressure tactics of the National Accountability Bureau and various government agencies against the couple as well as party leaders and workers. She was also an active proponent for the repealing of the Hudood Ordinance as well as the Blasphemy Law.

When the 2002 Pakistani general election were called in October, she was nominated as a candidate for the reserved seats for women in the National Assembly. She took oath as a legislator and was also made part of the Standing Committee on Privatization and the Standing Committee on Economic Affairs. She was also a senior member of the Finance Committee of the National Assembly that looked after the Assembly's budget.

In 2003, she attended the National Defence College course for civil leaders. She was one of the initiators of the relationship with the National Democratic Institute (NDI) and was invited to attend the "Win With Women – Global Initiative" of the Institute in December 2003. In June 2004, she was invited by the NDI to attend the 2004 Democratic National Convention in Boston where Senator John Kerry was nominated as the Democratic Party's candidate for president in 2004.

Fauzia also represented her party on a study tour of the German Parliamentary System in 2004.

With the 2005 Local Government elections taking place in August, she gained responsibility for working out an adjustment with the Jamat-e-Islami in the District East of Karachi. In September 2005, she was nominated to contest the elections of Nazim of the City District Government Karachi. However, her candidature was withdrawn in favour of Naimatullah Khan.

During the National Assembly of 2002 and 2007, she was an active member of the opposition involved in putting up a number of questions, calling attention notices, adjournment motions, resolutions and motions. She was also a mover of a number of bills including a bill on the environment and a ban on polythene bags.

She was nominated again for a second term by the PPP and returned to the National Assembly. She took oath as a Treasury bench member on 6 March 2008.

After Information Minister Sherry Rehman resigned from her government position, the party position she held was taken away and Fauzia Wahab was appointed the Information Secretary of the PPP. By virtue of being the Information Secretary, Fauzia Wahab became an ex officio member of the Central Executive Committee of the Party.

In her second term as MNA, she was elected as Chairman of the Standing Committee of the National Assembly on Finance and Revenue. This committee was the second most active parliamentary committee after the Public Accounts Committee in the number of meetings held.

== Benazir Bhutto's assassination ==
PPP Chairperson Benazir Bhutto returned to Pakistan after eight years of self-exile on 18 October 2007. A crowd of nearly 3,000 people had assembled outside Karachi's Jinnah International Airport. The convoy carrying Bhutto was attacked at midnight by a suicide bomber. More than 180 citizens and party workers were killed and more than 500 were injured. Wahab was also on the truck carrying Bhutto and was injured in the explosion. On 27 December 2007, Benazir Bhutto was assassinated in a gun and suicide bomb attack. Fauzia Wahab was one of the first leaders to reach the Bilawal House in Karachi and arranged for transportation of leaders and workers from Karachi to Garhi Khuda Bux for the funeral. She also received condolences from MQM Chief Altaf Hussain and various leaders on her assassination.

== Raymond Davis controversy ==
Wahab created a minor media controversy with her comments on Raymond Davis, a US citizen convicted of killing two men. Her comments on the outgoing Foreign Minister Shah Mehmood Qureshi, who allegedly resigned for his support of the judicial process for the Raymond Davis case in refusing to accept US pressure to grant him diplomatic status, landed her in further trouble with the PPP leadership and the media.

== Death ==
Wahab was admitted to a local hospital for an elective gall bladder surgery on 24 May 2012. Her condition worsened due to post-operative complications and she was moved to the ICU and had two subsequent surgeries. She died on Sunday, 17 June 2012. The Pakistan Peoples Party announced ten days of mourning for her death. Most Pakistani politicians expressed grief, including President Asif Ali Zardari and Prime Minister Yousaf Raza Gillani. Her funeral prayer occurred after Zuhr prayers at Sultan Masjid, in the Defence area of Karachi, and was attended by Chief Minister Syed Qaim Ali Shah, Advisor to the Prime Minister on Interior Affairs, Rehman Malik, and other provincial and federal ministers.

== Honors and awards ==
Her sudden death was a shock to majority of the political class and media of Pakistan. A session of the National Assembly on 6 July 2012 was dedicated to her memory in which members belonging to all parties in the parliament paid glowing tributes to her. The session was adjourned after praying for her departed soul. Prominent among those who spoke included Prime Minister Raja Pervaiz Ashraf, Makhdoom Amin Fahim, Aftab Sherpao, Bushra Gohar, Khwaja Saad Rafique, Hamid Saeed Kazmi and Abdul Qadir Patel. Abdul Qadir Patel requested the Speaker to form a parliamentary committee to ascertain facts if any negligence of doctors caused her death. He said that she lost her life due to a minor and ordinary operation conducted in an expensive private hospital.

On 14 August 2012, the president of Pakistan honoured her with a posthumous Hilal-e-Imtiaz award for her services to democracy and parliament.

Senior Journalist, Mujahid Barelvi has compiled a book eulogising Fauzia Wahab titled as "Muskurahat Zinda Rehti Hay" or "A Smile Never Dies". The book was launched at the Karachi Press Club on 10 November 2012 which was widely attended by a large number of political leaders belonging to PPP, MQM, Jamat-e-Islami, PML-N and PTI as well party workers, friends and well wishers.
