= Salim Nasir =

Pakistani actor

Saleem Nasir سلیم ناصر
- Born: Syed Sher Khan; 15 November 1944; Nagpur, British India
- Died: 19 October 1989 (aged 44); Karachi, Sindh, Pakistan
- Known for: Playing 'Akbar', the domestic help, in the PTV drama "Aangan Terha"
- Awards: Pride of Performance Award by the President of Pakistan in 1990

Saleem Nasir (Urduسلیم ناصر; 1944–1989), born Syed Sher Khan, was a Pakistani film and TV actor.

He is best known for his comic character Akbar, a classical dancer-turned-domestic help, in the PTV drama serial Aangan Terha (1984).

== Personal life ==
Saleem Nasir was born as Syed Sher Khan into a Rajput family in Nagpur, British India, on 15 November 1944.

At the age of 44, Salim Nasir died of a heart attack on 24 September 1989.

== Selected filmography ==
=== Films ===
Year	Title	Role
1976	Zaib-un-Nisa	Bahadur Shah Zafar

=== Television series ===
Year	Title	Role	Channel
1975	Ya Naseeb Clinic	Saifi	PTV
1976	Bandish	Amir	PTV
1980	Waiting Room	Mujeeb Siddiqui	PTV
1980	Nishan-e-Haider	Captain Sarwar Shaheed	PTV
1982	Ankahi	Shehryar	PTV
1984	Aangan Terha	Akbar	PTV
1986	Aakhri Chattan	Sultan Jalal ad-Din Manguberdi	PTV
1986	Dastak	Farooq	PTV
1989	Jangloos	Hayat Muhammad	PTV

== Awards ==
- Pride of Performance Award by the President of Pakistan in 1990.

== See also ==
- List of Lollywood actors
