= Mohsin Ali =

Pakistani hurdler (born 1987)

Personal information
- Full name: Mohsin Ali
- Nationality: Pakistani
- Born: 19 March 1987 (age 39)
- Height: 5 ft 6 in (168 cm)
- Weight: 60 kg (132 lb)

Sport
- Country: Pakistan
- Sport: Track and field
- Event: 110 m hurdles
Medal record
Men's athletics
Representing Pakistan
South Asian Games
Gold medal – first place	2010 Dhaka	110 m hurdles
Bronze medal – third place	2016 Guwahati	110 m hurdles

Mohsin Ali (Urdu: محسن علی) is a professional track and field athlete from Pakistan who competes in the 110 metres hurdles.

He won the 110 m hurdles title at the 2010 South Asian Games in Dhaka. He represented Pakistan at the 2011 Asian Athletics Championships and took part in the 60 metres hurdles at the 2012 Asian Indoor Athletics Championships.

== See also ==
- List of Pakistani records in athletics
- Athletics in Pakistan
