= Aangan Terha =

1984 Pakistani TV series

- Created by: Qaisar Farooq
- Written by: Anwar Maqsood
- Starring: Salim Nasir; Shakeel; Arshad Mehmood; Bushra Ansari; Durdana Butt; Azra Sherwani; Anwar Maqsood; Sultana Zafar
- Theme music composer: Arshad Mehmood
- Country of origin: Pakistan
- Original language: Urdu
- No. of seasons: 1
- No. of episodes: 12

Production
- Producer: Qaisar Farooq

Original release
- Network: PTV Home
- Release: 1984 – 19 March 1985

Aangan Terha (Urdu: آنگن ٹیڑھا, transl. Crooked Courtyard) is a satirical Pakistani drama presented by the PTV network in 1984. The show starred Salim Nasir, Shakeel, Arshad Mehmood, Durdana Butt, and Bushra Ansari in lead roles. It was directed by Qaiser Farooq and written by Anwar Maqsood.

== Plot and main theme ==
The drama is based on many stories on multiple issues in society and indirect criticism of martial law, the military regime in Pakistan, and the electoral system. Many major Pakistani stars and artists played guest roles in the drama, including great comedians like Lehri, Moin Akhtar, and Mahmood Ali and the pop singer Alamgir. The twist occurs when the writer, Anwar Maqsood, appears towards the end of the serial to inform the characters that the serial is about to end.

== Cast ==
=== Lead characters ===
- Shakeel as Mehboob Ahmed, a retired civil servant.
- Bushra Ansari as Jahan Ara Begum, Mehboob Ahmed's wife.
- Salim Nasir as Akbar, the domestic help of Mehboob Ahmed and Jahan Ara Begum, previously a classical dancer.
- Arshad Mehmood as Chaudhry Sahib, Mehboob Ahmed's neighbor.
- Durdana Butt as Sultana Sahiba, Chaudhry Sahib's sister.

=== Guest appearances ===
- Moin Akhtar as Moin
- Lehri as Lehri
- Alamgir as Alamgir
- Mahmood Ali as Uncle Traffic
- Anwar Maqsood as Anwar Maqsood
- Qazi Wajid as Rasheed
- Azra Sherwani as Saliha Begum
- Sultana Zafar as Maryam
- Latif Kapadia as Doctor Latif
- Asif Raza Mir as Bunty

== Reception ==
A 2025 write-up in The Friday Times listed the series among "impactful dramas that PTV produced" and noted that the eloquence of its dialogue had not faded away even after almost 40 years.

== Theatrical adaptation ==
The series was adapted as a theater play in 2013 starring Hareem Farooq, Talat Jilani and Yasir Hussain in lead roles.
