= Yasmeen Ismail =

Pakistani actress (1950–2002)

- یاسمین اسماعیل
- Born: 28 March 1950; Rawalpindi, Pakistan
- Died: 18 January 2002 (aged 51); Karachi, Pakistan
- Education: Home Economics College
- Occupations: Actress; Theater director
- Years active: 1968 - 2002
- Notable work: Tanhaiyaan
- Spouse: Tariq Ismail (m. 1974)
- Children: Amal Ismail (son); Sila Ismail (daughter)

Yasmeen Ismail (28 March 1950, Rawalpindi – 18 January 2002, Karachi) was a Pakistani television actress and theater director. She is known for her role in the PTV drama Tanhaiyaan (1985).

== Early life ==
She was born in Rawalpindi on 28 March 1950. Yasmeen Ismail studied in many schools and convents as her father, an army colonel, got posted from one place to another. She graduated from Home Economics College.

== Career ==
She moved to Karachi shortly after her father's death in 1971. She got married in 1974. Her association with PTV had begun in the late 1960s. Theatre lured her away as she became the director of the Karachi chapter of the Gripp's Theatre in 1980. She directed around two dozen plays. Their plays, mostly written/adapted by playwright Imran Aslam, were appreciated by people. A little before Ramazan in 2002, she directed her last play, titled Osama Ho To Samaney Aiy, which was written by Aslam.

== Personal life ==
At the time of her death, her son, Amal Ismail, was a 22-year-old entrepreneur and her daughter an 18-year-old student of the Indus Valley School of Art and Architecture. Her husband, Tariq Ismail, was the managing director of one of Pakistan's largest distribution companies.

== Illness and death ==
After battling ovarian cancer for 5 years, Ismail succumbed to the disease on 18 January 2002 in Karachi. She was laid to rest after Asr prayers on Friday in the Army Graveyard in Defence Housing Authority in Karachi.

== Filmography ==
=== Television series ===
- Sheshe Aadmi
- Nishan-e-Haider Rashid Minhas Shaheed
- Andhera Ujala
- Ana
- Do Sooraj
- Tanhaiyaan (1985) (PTV)
- Des Pardes
- Tapish
- Ghar Daftar Aur Hum
- Ajaib Khana
- Bacchon Ka Theatre
- Labaik Labaik
- Family 93
- Panchwan Mausam
- Kabhi Kabhi Pyar Mein
- Zara Si Badgumani

=== Telefilm ===
- Marhoom Brigadier Ki Betiyan
- Hum Tum Eid
- Zeher

=== Film ===
- Deewane Tere Pyar Ke

== Theatre Director ==
- Stokkerlock and Millilipi
- Mugnog Kids
- Choti Moti Tota Aur S. M. Hamid
- Pak Zar Zameen
- Hawa Ko Dawa Do
- Rail Pail Ka Khail
- Haspatal Ka Haal Achha Hai
- Kabab May Haddi
- Osama Ho To Samaney Aiy (last play before death)
