= Rahat Kazmi =

Pakistani actor

- راحت کاظمی
- Born: 30 June 1946 (age 80); Shimla, Punjab, British India
- Education: Government College; University of Punjab
- Occupations: Actor; Screenwriter; News presenter
- Years active: 1965 - present
- Spouse: Sahira Kazmi (m. 1974)
- Children: Ali Kazmi (son); Nida Kazmi (daughter)
- Relatives: Shyam (father-in-law); Rafay Kazmi (grandson)

Rahat Kazmi (Urdu: راحت کاظمی; born 30 June 1946) is a Pakistani actor, screenwriter, TV news presenter, anchor, and an academician.

He has worked in several TV serials for PTV such as in 1967 with Mayaar, rose to prominence in 1974 with Qurbatain aur Faaslay (his own adaptation of Turgenev's 1862 novel Fathers and Sons) and also starred in 1976 in Pakistan's first coloured and classical serial Parchaiyan. Later, he worked in PTV's many other TV dramas such as Teesra Kinara (his own adaptation of Ayn Rand's 1943 novel The Fountainhead), and Ehsaas (both in 1980), and Dhoop Kinare (1987).

== Early life and education ==
Rahat Kazmi was born in Shimla, on 30 June 1946. Rahat's father was a lawyer by profession, and he wanted his son to follow in his footsteps. Rahat completed his high school education in Rawalpindi from Gordon College. He successfully completed and received his law degree (LLB) in Lahore. Additionally, Rahat received his master's degree in political science from Government College University, Lahore and a master's degree in English literature from Punjab University before clearing the prestigious Central Superior Services (CSS) exam but left the civil service to pursue a career in showbiz. He had joined the civil service in 1968 as an Information Officer and left in 1976.

== Career ==
=== Actor ===
==== Television ====
Rahat began his acting journey during his Bachelor's studies at Government College, Lahore, with his first TV appearance in 1965 on a university program. He worked for Pakistan Television Network and appeared in famous drama serials such as Qurbatein Aur Faslay, Teesra Kinara, Parchayian, Dhoop Kinaray, Raghon Mein Andhera, Ehsas, Zikar Hay Kayi Saal Ka, Nangay Paon, Saraab and others.

==== Films ====
Rahat began his film career with Aaj Aur Kal in 1976, a box-office hit, and despite the early success in films he preferred television due to the "loud and exaggerated acting required for the big screen."

=== Screenwriter ===
Rahat became known for adapting major literary works for television drama serials. A notable example is his television adaptation of Fathers and Sons, the novel by Ivan Turgenev, first published in 1862. The Urdu adaptation, titled Qurbatain aur Faaslay, was broadcast by Pakistan Television from Rawalpindi in 1974. In the serial, Rahat Kazmi portrayed the character Ghazanfar, inspired by the novel’s protagonist Bazarov. Kazmi was also involved in the television serial Teesra Kinara, broadcast in 1980, which was adapted from themes and characters drawn from the work of Ayn Rand, most notably her novel The Fountainhead, first published in 1943.

=== Academic ===
He also teaches English Literature and Drama to A-level students at LAS, Karachi. Rahat Kazmi is also a director at the National Academy of Performing Arts. He has previously taught at Avicenna School and Hamdard University (Clifton Campus, Karachi) in 2001.

== Personal life ==
In 1974, Rahat married actress Sahira Kazmi, the daughter of actress Mumtaz Qureshi (Taji) and actor Shyam. They first met on the sets of PTV in 1971. They have a son, Ali Kazmi, an actor, and a daughter, Nida Kazmi, a former actress.

== Public image ==
=== In India ===
Due to projects such as Dhoop Kinare, Rahat was popular in India as well, especially in northern India and in western India, the Indian public having access to his series through pirated videotape cassettes, and a 1988 India Today report said of Rahat that "his looks are a mix of Amitabh Bachchan and Rajendra Kumar, but close your eyes and he sounds uncannily like Dilip Kumar."

== Filmography ==
=== Television series ===
Year	Title	Role	Screenwriter	Network	Notes
1967	Mayaar	Shakeel		PTV	
1968	Koltar	Shahzad		PTV	
1969	Auraq	Kaifi		PTV	
1970	Rahat Kazmi Show	Himself		PTV	
1972	Barzakh	Shahid		PTV	
1974	Qurbatain Aur Faaslay	Ghazanfar	Yes	PTV	Adaptation of Ivan Turgenev's Fathers and Sons (1862)
1975	Sangsaar	Ahmer		PTV	
1976	Parchaiyan	Adeel		PTV	
1978	Koel	Harris		PTV	
1980	Teesra Kinara	Ali	Yes	PTV	Adaptation of Ayn Rand's The Fountainhead (1943)
1982	Bazdeed	Nasir		PTV	
1982	Saraab	Rao Mujahid Naseer		PTV	
1983	Ragon Mein Andhera	Masood-Ur-Rehman		PTV	
1983	Adhay Chehray	Saleem		PTV	
1983	Pholan Wala Easta	Mansoor Ahmad		PTV	
1984	Andhera Ujala	Asad-Ur-Rehman		PTV	
1984	Anjanay Main	Jarjees		PTV	
1985	Karawaan	Gul Muhammad Khan		PTV	
1987	Ehsaas	Noman		PTV	
1987	Dhoop Kinare	Ahmer Ansari		PTV	
1988	Anarkali	Salim		PTV	
1988	Yeh Kahan Ki Dosti Hai	Hasan		PTV	
1990	Comedy Comedy	Himself		PTV	
1993	Nangey Paon	Azeem		PTV	
1995	Zikr Hai Kai Saal Ka	Sikandar		PTV	

=== Film ===
Year	Film	Language
1976	Aaj Aur Kal	Urdu
1976	Insaniyat	Urdu
1978	Mutthi Bhar Chawal	Urdu
1978	Mehman	Urdu
1979	Pakeeza	Urdu
1980	Aap Ki Khatir	Urdu
1980	Khandan	Urdu
1980	Saima	Urdu
1980	Suraj Bhi Tamashai	Urdu
1980	Aazmaish	Urdu
1982	Aas Paas	Urdu
1982	Jan-e-Mann	Urdu
1987	Ishtehari Mujrim	Pashto
1991	Qaher	Pashto

=== Theater ===
Drama / Play	Year	Writer / Producer / Director
Goonge	1967	N/A
Koltar	N/A	N/A
Anarkali	N/A	Fatima Surayya Bajia
Auraaq	N/A	Fatima Surayya Bajia
Qurbatain Aur Faaslay	1974	Safdar Hashmi
Ghazanfar	N/A	N/A
Teesra Kinara	N/A	Rahat Kazmi (Writer), Shahzad Khalil (Director)
Dhoop Kinare	1987	Haseena Moin, Sahira Kazmi (Director)
Karavan	N/A	Iqbal Ansari
Nangey Paaon	N/A	Shahid Kazmi (Writer), Haider Imam Rizvi (Director)
Ragoan Mein Andhera	N/A	Yunus Javed (Writer), Mohammad Nisar Hussain (Director)
Parchaiyan	1976	Haseena Moin
Ehsaas	N/A	Shahid Kazmi (Writer), Shahzad Khalil (Director)
Saraab	N/A	Bano Qudsia
Zikr Hai Kai Saal Ka	1996	Dr. Enwar Sajjad (writer)/Sahira Kazmi (director)
Kaise Kahoon	2006	Sahira Kazmi

== Awards and recognition ==
Year	Award	Category	Result	Title	Ref.
1987	Nigar Award	Best Actor	Won	Dhoop Kinare	

== See also ==
- List of Lollywood actors
