= Badar Khalil =

Pakistani actress

- بدر خلیل
- Born: Badar; 5 July 1945 (age 81); Delhi, British India
- Other names: Bi Jamalo, Aqeela
- Occupations: Actress; Director; Television presenter
- Years active: 1968–present
- Notable work: Ankahi; Tanhaiyaan; Dhoop Kinarey; Parosi; Doraha; Half Plate; Marvi.
- Spouse: Shahzad Khalil (m. 1968; died 1989)
- Children: Umar Khalil; Ibrahim Khalil

Badar Khalil (Urdu: بدر خلیل), also known as 'Baddo Aapa', is a Pakistani television actress. She gained popularity for her titular role in the TV play Bi Jamalo. She has appeared in TV serials on PTV since 1968. She also appeared in Mithu Aur Aapa, a comedy play on Hum TV.

== Early life ==
Badar Khalil was born on 5 July 1945 in Delhi in British India to a Kashmiri Muslim father and a Delhite mother. Her family moved to Lahore, Pakistan, during Partition of India in 1947.

== Career ==
In Karachi, her first main appearance was in the drama Ankahi, a classic TV drama written by Pakistani playwright Haseena Moin. In July 2014, she was getting ready to move to Canada after a 46-year-long professional acting career to live with one of her sons who was settled there. She continued working in some dramas of Pakistani TV channels.

== Personal life ==
Badar lives in Karachi, where she had moved with her husband, the TV director Shahzad Khalil. In 1989, her husband died of cardiac arrest.

== Filmography ==
=== Television series ===
- Bi Jamalo (1969)
- Half Plate
- Teesra Kinara (1980)
- Ankahi (1982)
- Tanhaiyaan (1985)
- Dhoop Kinare (1987)
- Parosi (1992)
- Tumse Kehna Tha (1995)
- Chaandni Raatain (2002)
- Quddusi Sahab Ki Bewah (2012)
- Doraha
- Marvi
- Madiha Maliha
- Bulbulay
- Meri Behan Meri Dewrani
- Shukk
- Kitni Girhain Baqi Hain
- Shareek-e-Hayat
- Malaal
- Mere Qatil Mere Dildaar
- Shikwa
- Vasl
- Tanhaiyan Naye Silsilay
- Mithu Aur Aapa

=== Film ===
- Yeh Dil Aap Ka Huwa
- Khulay Aasman Ke Neechay

== Awards and recognition ==
Year	Award	Category	Result	Ref.
1995	Lifetime Achievement Award	Award by Government of Pakistan	Won	
1998	PTV Award	Tribute to Pakistani Legends	Won	

== See also ==
- Pakistan Television
