= Arshad Mehmood (composer) =

Pakistani singer, composer, and actor

- ارشد محمود
- Occupations: Actor, musician
- Years active: 1972 – present
- Awards: Pride of Performance Award by the President of Pakistan in 2006

Arshad Mehmood is a Pakistani actor, music composer, and singer.

== Early life and career ==
He had first started composing music for Pakistan Television Corporation in 1972.

=== EMI Pakistan period ===
He later was the driving force behind EMI Pakistan. EMI provided the platform for Pakistan's biggest music artists during the 1970s and later decades. Arshad Mehmood served there as a music producer and a talent promoter. His role at EMI was so crucial that noted Pakistani music director Nisar Bazmi reportedly commented, "EMI Pakistan without Arshad would be a nonentity".

=== Pakistan television period ===
Pakistan Television Corporation, all through most of his active career, used to ask him to produce and compose music for it. During that long period, he worked with many prominent Pakistani singers like Nayyara Noor, Tina Sani, Tahira Syed, Noor Jehan, Mehdi Hassan, Reshma, Mehnaz Begum, A. Nayyar and Alamgir.

He had acting roles in Pakistani TV drama serials such as Aangan Terha and Dhoop Kinare, Khamosh Pani (Silent Waters) (2003) and the music composition of ghazals from the poetry of Faiz Ahmed Faiz. He knew Faiz Ahmad Faiz and learned a lot from him, important things like patience, rationalizing one's problems and being cheerful even in the face of adversity.

In recent years, he has been teaching music at National Academy of Performing Arts (Pakistan) (NAPA) in Karachi, Pakistan. In 2019, he was serving as director programmes and administration at NAPA.

== Awards and recognition ==
- Pride of Performance Award by the President of Pakistan in 2006 for his contributions in the field of Arts and Entertainment.
- In 2022, he was awarded PTV Award for Best Composer in Dhoop Kinare.

== Filmography ==
=== As an actor ===
- Khamosh Pani (Silent Waters) (2003)
- Ho Mann Jahaan (2016)
- Mehrunisa V Lub U (2017)
- Allahyar and the Legend of Markhor (2018)

== Television ==
=== As an actor ===
- Such Gup - satirical sketch show (PTV)
- Fifty Fifty - 1980s
- Ankahi PTV (1982)
- Aangan Terha PTV (1984)
- Dhoop Kinare PTV (1987)

=== As a composer ===
- Akkar Bakkar Bambay Bo (PTV) (1970s)
- Such Gup (PTV) (1975)
- Nestlé Nido Young Stars
- Ankahi (1982)

== See also ==
- Arfa Sayeda Zehra
- Faiz Ahmed Faiz
- Hamza Ali Abbasi
- Nayyara Noor
