= Sahira Kazmi =

Pakistani actress and television director

- Born: Sahira Chadha; 8 April 1950 (age 76); Bombay, India
- Occupations: Actress; Director; Producer; Newscaster
- Years active: 1970–2005
- Spouse: Rahat Kazmi (m. 1974)
- Children: Ali Kazmi (son); Nida Kazmi (daughter)
- Parent(s): Sunder Shyam (father); Mumtaz Qureshi (mother)
- Relatives: Zeb Qureshi (aunt); Shakir Ansari (brother)
- Awards: Pride of Performance Award by the President of Pakistan (2012)

Sahira Kazmi (Urdu: ساحرہ کاظمی) is a retired Pakistani actress, newscaster, producer and director. She is best known for her role in the country's first-ever colour television series Parchaiyan (1976) and for producing the cult-classic blockbuster series Dhoop Kinare (1987) and the acclaimed drama Nijaat (1993). She along with Uzma Gillani, Roohi Bano, Tahira Naqvi and Khalida Riyasat dominated the television screens of Pakistan during the 1970s and 1980s.

She is widely regarded as one of the most influential figures in the history of South Asian television, having fundamentally shaped the golden era of the Pakistan Television Corporation (PTV).

Kazmi first rose to national prominence as a leading actress in the 1970s, starring in landmark productions such as Parchaiyan (1976), before transitioning behind the camera. As a director, she broke institutional glass ceilings, delivering cultural masterpieces like Dhoop Kinare (1987) and helming socially conscious television that championed women's rights and public health. For her monumental contributions to the arts, she was honored with the prestigious Pride of Performance award by the Government of Pakistan.

== Early life ==
Kazmi was born on 8 April 1946 in Bombay to Shyam and Mumtaz Qureshi (also known as Taaji), both actors and prominent figures in the film industry of British India and her aunt Zeb Qureshi was also an actress in Hindi Cinema. However, after her father Shyam's tragic death in 1951, her family moved to Karachi, which was part of the new state of Pakistan. Sahira's mother, Mumtaz remarried a Pakistani entrepreneur with the surname Ansari. Sahira and her brother Shaakir changed their surnames and became Sahira Ansari and Shakir Ansari. Sahira and her brother also joined the acting field and both became prominent names in Pakistan's acting industry.

== Career ==
=== Early Career and Newscasting (1970–1974) ===
Following her graduation, Kazmi's family relocated from Karachi to Islamabad. In 1970, out of sheer boredom and at the strong insistence of a close family friend and the managing director of PTV, Aslam Azhar, she auditioned at the PTV Rawalpindi/Chaklala center. Though her underlying passion was behind-the-scenes filmmaking, the lack of formal training facilities at the time led Azhar to guide her toward hands-on experience via the newsroom. She was subsequently hired as an English language newscaster, an appointment that served as her introduction to the television medium.

Kazmi's on-screen career began in the 1970 when she started working as newscaster and would read news in English and later she started acting in PTV dramas in Rawalpindi.

=== Acting Stardom (1974–1980s) ===
Kazmi's modern aesthetic, commanding screen presence, and natural confidence quickly caught the attention of network producers, prompting her transition into fiction programming.

She made her acting debut was in Qurbatein aur Faslay as the female lead, which was an adaptation of Ivan Turgenev's classic Russian novel Fathers and Sons. The project paired her for the first time with the then newcomer and former civil servant, Rahat Kazmi. The duo's natural chemistry captivated the nation.

Kazmi achieved nationwide stardom when she was cast in Pakistan's first-ever color television drama serial Parchaiyan. Adapted by Haseena Moin from Henry James's The Portrait of a Lady, the serial cemented her status as a leading television actress.

She reunited with Rahat Kazmi in Teesra Kinara which was a massive hit, and was based on Ayn Rand's novel The Fountainhead. Her performances during this era defined the archetypal intelligent, independent Pakistani woman on screen.

She also acted in dramas Sangsaar, Sawan Roop, Picnic and Anjanay Main

=== Directing and Producing (1980s–2000s) ===
Later, Kazmi realized her passion lay in directing content and soon she turned towards directing and producing dramas. She had already directed a number of programmes after her first play, but she made her debut as a director when she launched the series Hawa ke Naam. The series highlighted women's rights and their imaging in Pakistan. Kazmi joined Pakistan television Karachi center as a permanent employee and worked as director and producer. She directed many dramas that went on to become a classic in the television history. Some of her best known dramas such as Tapish, Khaleej, Aahat, Hawa Ki Beti, Nijaat, Zaib-un-Nisa and Dhoop Kinaray written by Haseena Moin, and starred Rahat Kazmi and Marina Khan. The drama became Kazmi's most notable work in her production career. The series has achieved the status of a cult classic over the years. In 2019, the series were also translated into Arabic, to broadcast in Saudi Arabia. The step was taken as part of a cultural exchange between Saudi Arabia and Pakistan. Federal information minister Fawad Chaudhry announced during a visit to the Saudi capital of Riyadh that Islamabad would soon export its television series to the Kingdom. Arab News said the move is part of a push by Saudi Crown Prince Mohammed bin Salman in the last three years to modernize the Kingdom where cinemas, public concerts and other forms of entertainment have been banned for decades.

Kazmi is known for producing dramas and plays that highlighted social and political issues. Her drama Tapish revolved around a student leader and also highlighted the issue of rape. Aahat, Nijaat, Hawa Ki Beti and Zaib-un-Nisa highlighted the issues like poverty, domestic abuse and hardships faced by women. In 1993, Kazmi took a break from her career and came back with a new project Tum Se Kehna Tha; a play inspired by the Hollywood film While you were sleeping. Kazmi also directed many telefilms including Rozi, which starred Moeen Akhter as Rozi, and Zikr Hai Saal Ka, starring Rahat Kazmi and Atiqa Odho. She also produced the drama Kaise Kahoon, which starred Marina Khan.

Kazmi has also produced many music programs for PTV. She was behind "Dekha Na Tha Kabhi Hum Nay Yeh Saman", which was sung by Alamgir. She also came up with "Tere Ishq Mein Jo Bhi Doob Gaya", sung by the folk singer Allan Fakir and pop star Mohammad Ali Shehki. The song combined the words of Urdu and Sindhi.

== Personal life ==
In the mid 1970s, Sahira married Rahat Kazmi; a prominent actor with whom Sahira had worked in many dramas. It was then that Sahira changed her name to Sahira Kazmi. The two lived in Karachi and had a daughter Nida Kazmi and son Ali Kazmi.

== Filmography ==
=== Acting ===
==== Television series ====
| Year | Title | Role | Network |
|---|---|---|---|
| 1974 | Qurbatein Aur Faslay | Aliya | PTV |
| 1975 | Sangsaar | Bushra | PTV |
| 1976 | Parchaiyan | Najia | PTV |
| 1980 | Sawan Roop | Zareen | PTV |
| 1980 | Teesra Kinara | Mehreen | PTV |
| 1983 | Picnic | Iffat | PTV |
| 1983 | Anjanay Main | Samiya | PTV |

=== Director and Producer ===
- Ehsaas Aur Kamtari (1983)
- Khaleej (1986)
- Dhoop Kinare (1987)
- Tapish (1989)
- Hawa Ki Beti (1990)
- Aahat (1991)
- Nijaat (1993)
- Rozi (1993—Telefilm)
- Zikar Hai Kai Saal Ka (1995)
- Tum Se Kehna Tha (1995)
- Kaise Kahoon (1999)
- Zaib-un-Nisa (2000)

== Awards and recognition ==
- In 1978, she was awarded PTV Award for Best Actress.
- In 1978, she was awarded Graduate Award for Best Actress.
- In 1982, she was awarded PTV Award for Best Actress.
- In 1984, she was awarded PTV Award for Best Actress.
- In 1986, she was awarded PTV Award for Best Producer.
- In 1988, she was awarded Nigar Award for Best Producer in Dhoop Kinare.
- In 1990, she was awarded Nigar Award for Best Producer in Hawa Ki Beti.
- In 2012, Sahira was awarded the Pride of Performance Award by the government of Pakistan for her outstanding efforts in the field of television industry.

During the ceremony, Sahira said:

I’m very glad that my work has been recognized after a while and not long after I am gone from the scene! We should pay tribute to other people who have done things during their lifetime.

- In 2022, she was awarded PTV Award for Best Director in Dhoop Kinare.
