= Jamshed Ansari =

Pakistani actor

Jamshed Ansari جمشید انصاری
- Born: Jamshed Ansari; 31 December 1942; Saharanpur, Uttar Pradesh, British India
- Died: 24 August 2005 (aged 62); Karachi, Sindh, Pakistan
- Years active: 1968–2005

Jamshed Ansari (Urdu: جمشید انصاری) (31 December 1942 in Saharanpur – 24 August 2005 in Karachi) was a Pakistani film, television and radio actor.

He is remembered for his numerous performances on both radio and television, including as Safdar in the radio programme Hamid Mian Kay Haan and Hasnat Bhai in the PTV drama Uncle Urfi.

== Early life and education ==
He was born in Saharanpur, United Provinces, British India (now in UP, India) on 31 December 1942, to the family of a business tycoon, Zamir Hasan Ansari. Dubai Islamic Bank is the brainchild of Jamshed's older brother Tamiz. Ansari migrated with his family to Pakistan in 1948.

In his early adulthood, he moved to London, where he completed television production courses, worked in stage shows and with the BBC, returning to Pakistan in 1968, and launching his acting career the same year.

== Career ==
=== Radio ===
Ansari is remembered for his role as Safdar in Radio Pakistan's longest running programme, Hamid Mian Kay Haan (At Hamid Mian's house).

=== Television ===
Ansari made his debut in 1968 with the drama Jharokay.

His first drama from PTV's Karachi Centre was Agha Nasir's Ghora Ghaas Khata Hai ("The horse eats grass").

He worked in more than 200 TV plays including some popular dramas such as Uncle Urfi, Ankahi, Tanhaiyaan, etc.

== Death ==
Ansari died of a brain tumour on 24 August 2005. His funeral prayers were held at Baitul Mukarram Mosque, Gulshan-e-Iqbal, Karachi, followed by burial at Khurshidpura Graveyard in Hub, Balochistan.

== Awards ==
He was awarded 55 national and 2 international awards.

== Selected filmography ==
=== Film ===
Year	Title	Role	Notes
1970	Saughat		
1977	Aj Diyan Kurrian		Punjabi
1977	Begum Jaan		Urdu
1979	Pakeeza		

=== Television ===
Year	Title	Role	Notes
	Jharokay		
	Ghora Ghans Khata Hai		
1970s	Zair, Zabar, Pesh		
1973	Kiran Kahani	Safdar	PTV
1972	Uncle Urfi	Hasnat Ahmed	
1982	Ankahi	Tameez ud din (Timmy)	
1985	Tanhaiyaan	Buqrat	
1988	Yes Sir No Sir	Himself	Television show
	Half Plate		
1991	Kohar		
	Shiddat		

== See also ==
- List of Pakistani male actors
