= Shehnaz Sheikh =

Pakistani actress

- Born: 11 June 1962 (age 64); Kalaw, Myanmar (now) Burma
- Education: National College of Arts
- Occupations: Actress; Host; Director
- Years active: 1979–present
- Spouse: Seerat Hazir (m. 1982)
- Children: 2

Shehnaz Sheikh (born June 11, 1962) is a Pakistani television actress, host, and theatre director. She was one of the most popular and successful actresses of the 1980s. She has appeared in the drama serials Balila, Maray Thay Jin K Liye, Tanhaiyaan and Ankahi, as well as the show Uncle Sargam. After her successful television career, she left the industry in the mid-1990s and has since retired.

== Early life and education ==
Sheikh was born in Kalaw, Burma, and migrated to Pakistan in 1965 as a UN refugee and settled in Lahore, Pakistan, with her family, including her aunt, classical musician, Saffia Beyg. She attended the Convent of Jesus and Mary, Lahore, and later attended the National College of Arts where she graduated with a degree in Fine Arts.

== Career ==
=== Acting and hosting ===
Talking about start of her acting career, Sheikh said that "I wasn't really 'discovered' as most actors and actresses are. Someone had actually referred me to Haseena Moin for Ajnabi. She and Shoaib Mansoor invited me to try out for one of the roles." Sheikh made her debut in 1979 with drama serial Balila which was written by Shoaib Hashmi. The show was cancelled after only a few episodes had been aired but Sheikh had already been noticed and signed in drama serial Ankahi written by Haseena Moin and directed by Syed Mohsin Ali and Shoaib Mansoor. She played the role of Sana Murad an ambitious and level-headed girl from middle-class family.

Her next drama Maray Thay Jin K Liye was a critical success. Her performance as a modern, independent woman who is still conservative at heart was praised.

After the success of Ankahi, Sheikh again collaborated with Hassena Moin in her next drama serial Tanhaiyaan directed by Shahzad Kalil. The show received critical and commercial success and now considered cult classic.

In the early 1990s she appeared in couple of episodes of shows such as Uncle Sargam and Yes Sir, No Sir. She also hosted shows Showbiz Masala for NTM and Meri Pasand for PTV.

=== Retirement from acting ===
During an interview, Sheikh described her reasons of not acting anymore because of lack of new characters and challenges as an artist. She said that, "I didn't want to restrict myself to characters which depicted the exact same personality. I wanted to branch out into something more diverse, more challenging."

=== Tanhaiyan Naye Silsilay ===
After 27 years of Tanhaiyaan drama serial, a sequel named Olper's Tanhaiyan: Naye Silsilay was aired in late 2012. The script was co-written by Haseena Moin and Mohammad Ahmed and directed by Marina Khan. Six of the 16 original cast members reprised their roles but Sheikh refused the offer since she has quit acting. But Haseena Moin wanted her to render her voice for some letters her character has written to her sister in the drama. Sheikh agreed to doing a voice-over but demanded some amount for it. According to Haseena Moin, the sponsors refused to pay and she in return turned down the voice-over offer too.

During an interview, Haseena Moin said about Sheikh's refusal of the offer to be a part of Tanhaiyan Naye Silsilay that "My guess is that as she had created an image in the past serial with her looks and young age, she didn't want to spoil it." Sheikh's character was subsequently killed off before the events of Tanhaiyan Naye Silsilay.

=== Theater direction ===
In 2010, Sheikh moved into theater, and directed Agatha Christie's 1960 play The Mousetrap at LGS Paragon. She described it as a challenge because, "It isn't an easy play to perform; not only are the dialogues lengthy, but the names of the characters as well as the places mentioned [in the play] are rather alien for today's generation and, hence, difficult to remember and pronounce." The play received favourable responses from critics and audiences during its run.

In 2011, she was appointed as one of the judges for LUMS Dramafest.

=== Comeback to television ===
In 2021, Shehnaz Sheikh reunited with her friend and co-star Marina Khan in Tanhaiyaan on screen after 35 years for PTV show Star & Style.

Shehnaz returned to television in 2024 to host the talk show Ankahi with Shehnaz Sheikh on PTV. The show premiered on 7 May 2024, marking her return to television after a long hiatus.

== Personal life ==
Sheikh married Seerat Hazir on 24 December 1982, who is also a Pakistani Television personality. They have two sons together. She resides in Lahore with her family and teaching and directing children's plays, first at Aitchison College, Lahore and now at Lahore Grammar School, for over 18 years. Talking about her work, she said that, "I thrive in the environment I work in. With adults, I feel one always has to deliver. It's always 'what's it going to be this time?' You're always on your guard with adults. With children, it's more natural. They take you for what you really are. You don't have to pretend."

In November 2005, she along with her husband worked with FAME, a welfare organisation to help victims of 8 October 2005 earthquake in Northern Pakistan.

== Filmography ==
=== Acting credits ===
Year	Title	Role	Notes
1979	Balila		
1982	Ankahi		
1984	Maray Thay Jin Kay Liye		
1985	Tanhaiyaan		
1995	Daak Time with Uncle Sargam		

=== Reality television ===
Year	Title	Notes
1986	Anwar Maqsood Show Time	
1987	Aaap Ka Zamir	
1993	Yes Sir, No Sir	
1997	Showbiz Masala	
1998	Meri Pasand	
2021	Star & Style	
2024	Ankahi with Shehnaz Sheikh	
2025	Star & Style	

== Awards and recognition ==
Year	Award	Category	Result	Title	Ref.
1982	Nigar Award	Best TV Actress	Won	Ankahi	
