= Qazi Wajid =

Pakistani actor (1940–2018)

- قاضی واجد
- Born: Qazi Abdul Wajid Ansari; 26 May 1940; Gwalior state, British India
- Died: 11 February 2018 (aged 77); Karachi, Sindh, Pakistan
- Occupation: Actor
- Years active: 1950–2018
- Children: Unaiza Qazi

Qazi Wajid (Urdu: قاضی واجد) (26 May 1940 – 11 February 2018) was a Pakistani actor.

His works include Shama, Tanhaiyaan, Dhoop Kinare, Chand Grehan, Zair, Zabar, Pesh, Hawain, Mehndi, Safar Ba-khair, Kaisi Ye Paheli, Afshan, Kiran Kahani, Khuda Ki Basti and Ankahi.

Predominantly he has been paired with Ayesha Khan as there chemistry and camaraderie was liked on screen till date marking his last project with her itself. She even became a part of his documentary aired on PTV titled Main Hoon Qazi Wajid

After 25 years on radio, he became a television actor in 1966, and was awarded the Pride of Performance Award in 1988 by the Government of Pakistan.

In a career spanning more than 65 years, he did "more than 1,200 dramas as a staff artist for Radio Pakistan since 1977, and more than 500 dramas for TV."

He died in Karachi on 11 February 2018.

PTV released a documentary called Main Hoon Qazi Wajid.

== Personal life ==
He was born Qazi Abdul Wajid Ansari in 1930 in Gwalior state in British India.

His family, including five siblings (three brothers and two sisters), moved to Pakistan after the partition in 1947.

== Early career ==
He began his career by joining Radio Pakistan as a child artiste in 1949.

== Selected filmography ==
Year	Title	Role	Notes
1966	Taleem-e-Balighan		
1969	Khuda Ki Basti	Raja	
1974	Zair, Zabar, Pesh	Houseboy	
1976	Shama		
1981	Afshan	Ahmed	
1982	Ankahi	Siddiqui Sahib	
1984	Aangan Terha		Cameo
1985	Karawaan	Producer	
1985	Tanhaiyaan	Faraan	
1987	Dhoop Kinare	Baba	
1990	Hawa Ki Beti	Abba	
1991–92	Aahat	Anwar	
1995	Chand Grehan	Kamal	
1995	Hawain	Doctor Aarfi	
2003	Mehndi	Iqbal	
2008–09	Doraha	Umer's father	
2012–13	Raju Rocket	Raju's (Danish Taimoor) father	
2012–13	Tanhaiyan Naye Silsilay	Faraan	
2013	Pheeki Theek Kehta Hai	An 1 episodic in a telefilm series named ( Bahar Ki Shakar film)	A Plus Tv
2014	Pehchaan	Laila's father	
2015	Khuda Dekh Raha Hai	Akhtar	
2016	Mann Pyasa		
2016	Dil-e-Beqarar	Abbas	
2018	Khaani	Judge	Cameo
2017	Begunah	Abbaji	Ary Digital
2003	Eid Aayi		Telefilm
2016	Safar Bakhair	Husband of Ayesha Khan Central Character	Eid SpecialTelefilm
2017-18	Kesi Ye Paheli	Jahangir-Almas's (Ayesha Khan) husband & Sameer's grandfather	Urdu 1( His last show onscreen paired him with Ayesha Khan)
2015	Tumhari Natasha		Hum Tv

== Death ==
Qazi Wajid died of a heart attack on 11 February 2018, in Karachi. He was 87 years old.

== See also ==
- List of Lollywood actors

== Awards ==
- Pride of Performance Awards – (1988) from the Government of Pakistan.
