= Anita Ayoob =

Pakistani actress

- Born: Anita Ayoob; 17 September 1970 (age 55); Karachi, Pakistan
- Other names: Aneeta Ayoob; Anita Ayub; Anita Ayub Majeed
- Education: University of Karachi; Roshan Taneja School of Acting
- Occupations: Actress; Model; Host
- Years active: 1987 - 2010
- Spouse(s): Subak Majeed (husband); Saumil Patel (divorced)
- Children: Shazer (son)
- Parent: Mumtaz Ayub (mother)
- Relatives: Sherry Malik (brother); Amber Ayub (sister)

Anita Ayoob (also known as Anita Ayub and Aneeta Ayoob) is a Pakistani actress and model. She appeared in films in Bollywood and Lollywood, in addition to working in television dramas and advertisements in the 1980s and 1990s.

== Early life ==
Anita was born in Karachi, Pakistan and studied at a private girls college, before completing a master's degree in English literature from the University of Karachi. She belongs to a Punjabi Pathan family, who were close friends with Waheed Murad's family. She was discovered and approached by a modeling agent to model in commercials.

Anita went to India to study acting and was trained in acting by Roshan Taneja at Roshan Taneja School of Acting at Mumbai.

== Career ==
She started working as a model in her early teens and also worked in Hindi and Urdu films. In 1987 she made her debut as an actress in drama Gardish and appeared with Shakeel, Izhar Qazi and Roohi Bano which was aired on PTV and she portrayed the role of Sehrish. As a model, she represented her country in Miss Asia Pacific International beauty pageant held in Manila, Philippines in 1989.

In 1992 she worked in drama Hasina-E-Alam along with Rizwan Wasti, Amber Ayub and Rabia Noreen the drama was written by Fatima Surayya Bajia which was based on Waheeda Naseem's novel Hasina-E-Alam and she portrayed the role of Princess Shehryar a british model.

In 1993, she worked in drama Eid Flight along with Subhani Ba Yunus, Mahmood Ali, Abdullah Kadwani and Rizwan Wasti which was written by Manzar Imam and directed by Moin Akhtar. She portrayed the role of Nida a flight air hostess.

In 1993 she went to India for a commercial shooting and there Dev Anand, who was looking for a new actress, saw her commercial and he cast her for his film Pyaar Ka Tarana. She made her Bollywood debut in 1993 with film Pyaar Ka Tarana, which was written and directed by Dev Anand the film received averaged reviews but later turned out to be successful at the box office. Later the same year she was invited to comedy show Yes Sir, No Sir by Moin Akhtar and she appeared alongside former cricket Imran Khan.

Then she was offered a lead role in film Bulund with Salman Khan before it was called Nihatta and then she completed some shooting scenes with Salman Khan but after sometime she refused to work in the movie because director M.R. Shahjahan made many changes and she couldn't accept it so she left it then Somy Ali was cast in the lead role instead she signed a film with Dev Anand.

In 1994 she was cast by Salim Chandan in his production film Prem Chakra co-starring with Deepak Tijori, Ashok Saraf, Sophia Khan, Arun Bakshi, Jackie Bhantu and Musaddique the film's music was composed by Rajesh Roshan and directed by Mustanseer but the film was shelved.

Then film director Jan Mohammad cast Anita in his film Sub Ke Baap along with Mohsin Khan, Moin Akhtar, Sabeetha Perera, Shafi Muhammad Shah and Saud the film was a super hit at box office. When director Hasnain saw Anita in film Sub Ke Baap then he immediately cast her along with Mustafa Qureshi, Naghma, Shafqat Cheema, Nargis and Umer Shareef in film Chalti Ka Naam Gari the film did well at the box office and was silver jubilee.

Then she worked in film Maria with Ali Haider and her role received positive reviews. In 1995 she appeared in show Hip Hip Hurray Season 1 on STN the show was hosted by Umer Shareef in which she received an award for her performance from Umer Shareef.

Later she worked with Dev Anand again in film Gangster in 1995 which was a box office success. The same year she worked in drama Doosra Raasta which aired on PTV.

In 1997, she appeared in lead role as Marilee in drama Waqt Ka Aasman and she portrayed the role of a modern and educated student. In 1998, she portrayed the role of Anita in musical drama Yeh Jahan and she was cast with Adnan Siddiqui the drama was written and directed by Riffat Humayoun.

She had a long and successful career in India and Pakistan after appearing in some movies and she also worked in popular dramas in Pakistan which aired on PTV and then she moved to New York and settled there with her family.

In New York she hosted morning shows and guest shows on AT&T TV.

== Personal life ==
During the shooting of film Bulund with Salman Khan before it was titled Nihatta during the production, Salman fell in love with Anita but she respectfully rejected him; then he kept harassing her and implied that they should be involved so she left the film.

Ayoob married Saumil Patel, an Indian Gujarati businessman in 1995. After her marriage, she moved to New York. She has a son named Shazer with Patel. After her divorce from Patel, she married Subak Majeed, a Pakistani businessman. Actress Amber Ayub is her sister. Their brother Sherry Malik is also an actor.

== Filmography ==
=== Television series ===
Year	Title	Role	Network
1987	Gardish	Sehrish	PTV
1992	Hasina-E-Alam	Princess Shehryar	PTV
1993	Eid Flight	Nida	PTV
1993	Yes Sir, No Sir	Herself	PTV
1995	Hip Hip Hurray Season 1	Herself	STN
1995	Doosra Raasta	Simi	PTV
1997	Waqt Ka Aasman	Marilee	PTV
1998	Yeh Jahan	Anita	PTV

=== Film ===
Year	Film	Language
1993	Pyaar Ka Tarana	Hindi
1994
1994	Sub Ke Baap	Urdu
1994	Chalti Ka Naam Gari	Punjabi
1994	Maria	Urdu
1995	Gangster	Hindi

== Awards and nominations ==
Year	Award	Category	Result	Title	Ref.
1995	STN Awards	Best New Talent	Won	Hip Hip Hurray Season 1	

== Controversies ==
In 1989, she participated in the Miss Asia Pacific International beauty pageant, where she made a controversial remark on polygamy during the contest in Manila, Philippines. She was quoted as saying, "Muslim women should be allowed to have four spouses, just as Muslim men can take four wives at any one time." After her statement, she was forced to withdraw from the contest. She was accused of preaching immorality by outraged Pakistanis. In January 1989, 22 lawyers demanded that she should clarify her statement. A case was filed against her in Pakistan, terming her alleged statement "illegal and immoral".

Ayoob has been reported to have a close association with Dawood Ibrahim. In 1995, producer Javed Siddique was allegedly shot dead by members of Dawood's gang after he refused to cast Anita in a Hindi film.
