= Zafar Masood (actor) =

Pakistani actor

- Born: 10 July 1950; Lahore, Pakistan
- Died: 24 May 1981 (aged 30); Cairo, Egypt
- Resting place: Karachi
- Education: Cathedral High School
- Occupation: Actor
- Years active: 1969 - 1981

Zafar Masood was a Pakistani actor. He was a popular actor of the 1970s. He was known for his roles in the dramas Khuda Ki Basti, Uncle Urfi, Kiran Kahani and Zair, Zabar, Pesh.

== Early life ==
Zafar was born in Lahore, Pakistan and completed his studies from Cathedral High School in Lahore. He was interested in acting and joined Radio Pakistan at Lahore.

== Career ==
He started his acting from PTV Karachi Centre and made his debut in drama Khuda Ki Basti as Nosha. The drama was written by Shaukat Siddiqui based on his novel; Zafar portrayed the role of Nosha and Zaheen Tahira did the role of his mother. The serial turned out to be a super-hit and won many laurels and accolades.

In 1971 he worked in drama Dada Aur Dil Dada with Uzma Gillani and Mehnaz Rafi which was written by Ashfaq Ahmed. Later, he worked in film Khamosh Nigahen with Waheed Murad, Rozina and Husna.

Then he worked in Uncle Urfi written by Haseena Moin. In 1973 he worked in drama Kiran Kahani with Roohi Bano, Manzoor Qureshi and Begum Khurshid Mirza which was also written by Haseena Moin and then he worked again in her drama Zair, Zabar, Pesh with Roohi Bano, Shakeel and Qazi Wajid. He worked in two Punjabi films and three Urdu films.

In 1976 he appeared in film Deewar with Babra Sharif, Ghulam Mohiuddin and Allaudin. It was written by Shabab Kiranvi. The same year he again worked with Haseena Moin and appeared in the drama Bandish with Khalida Riyasat and Talat Hussain.

In 1978 he appeared in drama Aabginey with Talat Iqbal. The drama was written by Fatima Surayya Bajia. He subsequently appeared in other dramas.

== Personal life ==
Zafar's family initially lived in Lahore. Later, they moved to Karachi.

== Death ==
Later he got a job in a shipping company in Cairo. He died in Egypt in May 1981 when his car met an accident. His body was brought back to his parents and he was laid to rest at a Karachi graveyard.

== Filmography ==
=== Television ===
Year	Title	Role	Network
1969	Khuda Ki Basti	Nosha	PTV
1969	Gar Too Bura Na Maney	Ateeq	PTV
1971	Dada Aur Dil Dada	Jalal	PTV
1972	Uncle Urfi	Javed	PTV
1973	Kiran Kahani	Irfan	PTV
1974	Zair, Zabar, Pesh	Jamil	PTV
1975	Aik Mohabbat So Afsanay	Ahmad	PTV
1976	Aape Ranjha Hoi	Ranjha	PTV
1976	Bandish	Khalid	PTV
1978	Aabginey	Danial	PTV

=== Film ===
Year	Film	Language
1970	Naseeb Apna Apna	Urdu
1971	Khamosh Nigahen	Urdu
1976	Deewar	Urdu
