= Neelofar Abbasi =

Pakistani actress

- نیلوفر عباسی
- Born: Neelofar Aleem; 9 August 1955 (age 70); Karachi, Sindh, Pakistan
- Education: University of Karachi (Masters in Mircrobiology)
- Occupation: Actress
- Years active: 1969 – present
- Spouse: Qamar Ali Abbasi (m. 1975; died 2013)
- Children: Sobia Abbasi (daughter); Wajahat Abbasi (son); Maria Abbasi (daughter)
- Parents: Aleemuddin Khan (father); Noon Khan (mother)
- Relatives: Asif Farrukhi (cousin); Anwar Ahsan Siddiqi (uncle); Wajahat Ali (father-in-law)

Neelofar Abbasi (née Aleem) is a Pakistani actress. She is known for her roles in dramas Happy Eid Mubarak, Khumaar Zeher Alood, Aroosa, Naya Raasta and Eid Ka Jora. Neelofar is best known for her role in the drama Shehzori as Tara.

== Early life ==
Neelofar was born on 9 August 1955 in Karachi, Pakistan. She was interested in arts and literature from a young age. Her father Aleemuddin was a writer for newspapers and her mother Noon was a radio artist.

In first grade, she used to read Shaukat Siddiqui's books including the famous book Khuda Ki Basti and soon after she began to read books of Krishan Chander and Ismat Chughtai. Neelofar got interested in radio shows and wanted to host her own show.

Since Neelofar's mother was a radio artist, she tried to join the radio through her contacts but her mother insisted that Neelofar try her luck by auditioning for the radio. Neelofar studied science subjects at D.J. Science College and completed her masters in microbiology from University of Karachi.

== Career ==
Neelofar was fourteen and she was taking a class of Hashim Jalali, the elder brother of the legendary director and producer Qasim Jalali, he realized her potential towards radio and acting. He encouraged Neelofar towards radio and insisted she audition for a radio show. Neelofar was selected in the audition, leading to her first drama, which was on radio. Neelofar was in school and doing radio work at the same time. She was inspired by radio artists Talat Hussain and Sajida Syed.

Then Neelofar did Radio for Karachi and stage plays which were written by her parents. While still in College Neelofar did an audition for Jashn-e-talaba and she was selected by the judges and earned her a fame there radio director Yawar Mehdi trained Neelofar on various radio programs, including voiceover. Neelofar was noted for friendly face, appearances and highly refined etiquette.

In 1970 Neelofar was awarded Tyfon Award by cricketer Hanif Mohammad for her contribution towards radio and television.

During 1970s Neelofar begin to host Subah-e-Nau a Daily Morning Show on Radio Pakistan, she interviewed various actors and singers including Jamiluddin Aali and Nanha the show was a success and ran for almost two decades from 1970s to 1980s.

In 1974 Neelofar became popular when she portrayed the role of Tara in drama Shehzori which was written by Haseena Moin. Neelofar's acting was praised by actor Shakeel with whom she worked in many dramas. The role of Tara was breakthrough for Neelofar and she became popular in the country and that attracted the attention of politician Nusrat Bhutto who loved Neelofar's acting in Shehzori and became fond of Neelofar.

In 1991 Neelofar left acting for a brief time and she moved abroad to America with her husband Qamar. There she began to write for Good Morning Pakistan.

In 1992 she returned to acting and appeared in some dramas and in 1994 she appeared in drama Aroosa which was written by Fatima Surayya Bajia on PTV.

In 2014 she appeared in drama Jackson Heights on Urdu 1 and the same year she got Lifetime Achievement Award by Arts Council of Pakistan Karachi for her contribution towards the television industry.

The following year in 2015 Neelofar received the Women of Inspiration Award from Minister Tariq Fazal Chaudhry presented by Wonder Women Association of Pakistan for her contribution towards the radio and television industry.

== Personal life ==
Neelofar married writer and producer Qamar Ali Abbasi in 1975 and Nusrat Bhutto was a guest at their wedding. Later Nurast Bhutto invited Neelofar and her husband Qamar for dinner at the PM House. They had three children a son named Wajahat and two daughters named Maria and Sobia. Qamar Abbasi died on 1 June 2013.

== Filmography ==
=== Television ===
Year	Title	Role	Network
1969	Eid Ka Jora	Kaneezan	PTV
1969	Inspector	Maria	PTV
1970	Gar Too Bura Na Maney	Neelo	PTV
1970	Hisaar	Safia	PTV
1970	Tah-e-Daam	Herself	PTV
1970	Khabar Hai Aane Ki	Lubna	PTV
1971	Jahan Barf Girti Hai	Yasmeen	PTV
1971	Intizar Hai Un Ka	Fatima	PTV
1972	Khumaar Zeher Alood	Shabana	PTV
1972	Subah-e-Nau	Herself	PTV
1973	Rumi	Rumi	PTV
1973	Resham	Resham	PTV
1974	Shehzori	Tara	PTV
1975	Naya Raasta	Samina	PTV
1976	Happy Eid Mubarak	Babi	PTV
1977	Burda Farosh	Rehana	PTV
1978	Faaltu Aadmi	Amna	PTV
1979	Aakhri Chatan	Tania	PTV
1982	Sona Chandi	Begum Akhtar	PTV
1983	Bahadur Ali	Razia	PTV
1987	Rakh	Shaista	PTV
1990	Sho Sha	Baho Begum	PTV
1992	Fanooni Lateefay	Nafisa Begum	PTV
1994	Aroosa	Choti Aapa	PTV
1994	Baray Baray Dahi Baray	Shahida	PTV
1996	Paisal Kaa Mamla Hai	Shakeel's mother	PTV
2008	Marina Mornings	Herself	ARY Digital
2008	Eid Show Pakistan Chowk	Herself	PTV
2010	Bano Ki Havali	Herself	ARY Digital
2012	Brunch With Bushra Ansari	Herself	Geo TV
2014	Jackson Heights	Sikandar's mother	Urdu 1
2021	Morning at Home	Herself	PTV

=== Telefilm ===
Year	Title	Role
1991	Baray Baray Dahi Baray	Bajia

== Awards and recognition ==
Year	Award	Category	Result	Title	Ref.
1970	Tyfon Award	Best Actress	Won	Herself	
2014	Arts Council of Pakistan Karachi	Lifetime Achievement Award	Won	Herself	
2015	Wonder Women Association of Pakistan	Women of Inspiration	Won	Herself	

== Bibliography ==
Neelofar authored a critically book titled Kahi Ankahi also a memoir about her life and in memory of her parents. She wrote about her experience as a radio artist and television actress. Neelofar also wrote about actors and actresses with whom she had worked.
