= Ana (1984 TV series) =

1984 Pakistani television series

- Genre: Drama
- Written by: Fatima Surayya Bajia
- Directed by: Haider Imam Rizvi
- Starring: Shakeel; Ghazala Kaifee; Begum Khursheed Mirza; Azra Sherwani; Izhar Qazi; Arsh Muneer; Mehreen Ilahi; Sajida Syed; Ishrat Hashmi; Rizwan Wasti; Sultana Zafar; Yasmeen Ismail; Khursheed Shahid; Mehmood Akhtar; Subhani Bayounus; Latif Kapadia
- Country of origin: Pakistan
- Original language: Urdu
- No. of episodes: 21

Production
- Producer: PTV
- Production company: PTV Karachi Centre

Original release
- Network: PTV
- Release: 1984 – 1984

Ana is a Pakistani TV drama that aired on PTV in early 1984. It was written by Fatima Surayya Bajia and directed by Haider Imam Rizvi.

== Synopsis ==
It is a story of three generations and a girl who brings together her estranged parents.

== Cast ==
- Shakeel as Sohail
- Ghazala Kaifee as Rushna
- Begum Khurshid Mirza as Rashida Hameed
- Izhar Qazi as Vicky
- Mehreen Ilahi as Anna
- Azra Sherwani as Shah Begum
- Ishrat Hashmi as Shamsara
- Arsh Muneer as Amma
- Zeenat Yasmeen as Yasmeen
- Hafeez Fatima as Manchoo
- Sajida Syed as Tara Begum
- Yasmeen Ismail as Annie
- Sultana Zafar as Nadira
- Mahmood Ali as Mughal
- Zarina Baloch as Razia
- Najma Khatoon as Najma
- Khursheed Shahid as Begum Sahiba
- Mehmood Akhtar as Ejaz
- Rizwan Wasti as Jahanzeb
- Mohammad Yousaf as Mehmood Zafar
- Subhani Bayounus as Ghulam Muhammad Paracha
- Latif Kapadia as Iftikhar Malik
- Anwar Kamal as Niazi
- Ibrahim Nafees as Niaz
- Afzaal Syed as Zorawar
- Ismail Changezi as Sher Nawaz

== Production ==
=== Casting ===
Due to Izhar Qazi's striking resemblance with Indian film actor Amitabh Bachchan, he immediately caught the attention of Fatima Surayya Bajia who wanted to cast a newcomer for this role, which marked his acting debut. Mehreen Ilahi was finalised to portrayed the titular Anna, who got the role after being spotted by Bajiya, at her sister's boutique. Despite initial disapproval from her mother due to her studying abroad, Mehreen landed the lead role with her mother's eventual consent.

== Accolades ==
Year	Award	Category	Recipients and nominees	Result	Ref.
1985	Nigar Awards	Best Drama	Ana	Won	
1985	Nigar Awards	Best Writer	Fatima Surayya Bajia	Won	
1986	6th PTV Awards	Best Actress	Ghazala Kaifee	Nominated	
1986	6th PTV Awards	Best Set Designer	Mohsin Mirza	Won	
