= Afshan (TV series) =

Pakistani television series

- افشاں
- Genre: Family; Drama
- Based on: Afshan by A. R. Khatoon
- Written by: Fatima Surayya Bajia
- Directed by: Qasim Jalali
- Starring: Shakeel; Ayesha Khan; Tahira Wasti; Shafi Muhammad Shah; Begum Khurshid Mirza
- Country of origin: Pakistan
- Original language: Urdu
- No. of seasons: 1
- No. of episodes: 12

Production
- Producer: M. Zaheer Khan

Original release
- Network: PTV
- Release: 1981 – 1981

Afshan (Urdu: افشاں, lit. 'Sprinkle') is a 1981 Pakistani television series. Fatima Surayya Bajia adapted the script from a novel of the same name by Amtur Rahman Khatoon. Qasim Jalali directed; M. Zaheer Khan produced. It ran for twelve episodes on PTV.

== Synopsis ==
The story unfolds in 1946–47, in the months leading up to and through Partition. At its centre is a large Muslim joint family whose elders take it upon themselves to decide the lives of the younger generation. Family honour comes first — even ahead of whether the children, whose marriages are arranged for them, are happy.

== Cast ==
- Shakeel as Ali Raza
- Ayesha Khan as Husna
- Zainab Umar as Afshan
- Tahira Wasti as Najmus Sehar, David's daughter
- Qazi Wajid as Ashfaq Ahmed, Naseera's husband
- Shafi Muhammad Shah/ Qurban Jillani as Mohsin Mumtaz
- Begum Khurshid Mirza as Alam Ara
- Ishrat Hashmi as Naseera
- Arsh Muneer as Chachi Jan
- Rizwan Wasti as Abid
- Azra Sherwani as Roshan Begum
- Qaiser Naqvi as Chand Bibi
- Tasneem Rana as Bunyadi Aunty
- Agha Waheed as Ahsan Mumtaz
- Subhani Ba Yunus as Nawab Hameedullah
- Mazhar Ali as Shehryar
- Mahmood Ali as Deeno
- Imtiaz Ahmed as David Koen, Najmus Sehar's father
- Hadi-ul-Islam as Mumtaz Ahmed
- Aslam Latar as Busaria Afandi
- Fahmeed Ahmed Khan as Kirmani
- Ibrahim Nafees as Mirza
- Kamal Irani as Nawab Muzafar
- Majid Ali as Charagh
- Koko Mehdi as Mehmood
- Nisar Qadri as Aamir

== Production ==
=== Casting ===
Due to the reigem of General Zia-ul-Haq's government, Shafi Muhammad Shah was banned due to his collaboration with Indian actors including Deepti Naval when the serial was on-air; and he was subsequently replaced by Qurban Jillani in the later episodes. Afshan was Begum Khurshid Mirza's third project with Bajia. She'd already worked with her on Shama (1976) and Aagahi, and the two would team up once more on Ana (1984) — Mirza's last television role before she retired the following year.

== Awards and nominations ==
Year	Award	Category	Recipient	Result	Ref.
1982	PTV Awards	Best Actress	Begum Khurshid Mirza	Won	
