= Shehzori =

Pakistani television series

- Genre: Comedy
- Written by: Haseena Moin
- Directed by: Mohsin Ali
- Starring: Shakeel; Neelofar Abbasi; Ishrat Hashmi; Arsh Muneer; Mahmood Ali; Subhani Ba Yunus; Mohammad Yousuf; Khalid Nizami
- Country of origin: Pakistan
- Original language: Urdu
- No. of seasons: 1
- No. of episodes: 7

Production
- Production location: Pakistan

Original release
- Network: Pakistan Television Corporation
- Release: 1973

Shehzori (Urdu: شہزوری) is a Pakistani Urdu-language television series that aired every Sunday on Pakistan Television (PTV) in 1973. It was the debut serial of the playwright and scriptwriter Haseena Moin, who went on to become the most famous and successful drama writer of Pakistan, and to this day no writer has matched the popularity that she achieved. Shehzori is based on a work of the same name by Mirza Azeem Baig Chughtai. It was directed by Mohsin Ali.

== Synopsis ==
A young couple get married without telling their parents who do their best to split up the relationship. The short serial focuses on the ups and downs of the couple's marital life and how Tara (Neelofar Abbasi), a strong woman, wins over her evil father-in-law. Also portrayed is the story of Mustafa (Shakeel), a weak man who cannot take a stand for his wife. This comedy serial gives out several strong messages which are relevant to this day.

== Cast ==
- Shakeel as Mustafa
- Neelofar Abbasi as Tara
- Mahmood Ali as Hashim
- Ishrat Hashmi as Tara's mother
- Khalid Nizami as Afaq
- Arsh Muneer as Mali Khala
- Subhani Ba Yunus as Ikram
- Mohammad Yousuf as Samad Chacha
- Rabia Mehmood as Begum Ikram
- Hadi ul Islam as Waqar
- Wakeel Farooqi as Ghunda
- Aftab Sethi as Doctor

== See also ==
- Pakistan Television
