= Zaheen Tahira =

Pakistani film and television actress (1931–2019)

Zaheen Tahira TI
- ذہین طاہرہ
- Born: 1931; Lucknow, British India
- Died: 9 July 2019 (aged 88); Karachi, Pakistan
- Other name: Tahira Aapa
- Occupations: Television actress, Film actress
- Years active: 1956–2019
- Known for: Khuda Ki Basti; Hajj-e-Akbar
- Awards: Tamgha-e-Imtiaz (2013)

Zaheen Tahira (1931 – 9 July 2019) was a Pakistani film and television actress, producer and director. She also worked for Radio Pakistan and on stage.

== Early life ==
She was born in 1931 in Lucknow, British India. According to some sources, she was born in 1935.

== Career ==
She was considered one of the most senior and veteran actresses in Pakistan television history. She dominated the TV screens in the late 1960s, 1970s and 1980s by portraying strong characters mainly on dramas produced by Pakistan Television Corporation (PTV) Karachi centre. She appeared in over 700 drama serials in lead and supporting roles. She also produced and directed a few television series. She played the lead role in Pakistan's record-breaking serial Khuda Ki Basti based on the novel of the same name by Shaukat Siddiqui.

In 2013, the President of Pakistan awarded her the Tamgha-e-Imtiaz (Medal of Distinction) in recognition of her work in the Pakistani entertainment industry.

== Illness and death ==
Tahira was admitted to Aga Khan University Hospital in Karachi after suffering a major cardiac arrest on 23 June 2019. On 27 June 2019 she was shifted to the CCU from ICU. Her son Kamran Khan said that "Mum is hospitalized. she is getting better now, By evening they will remove the ventilator." Her grandson Danial Shahzad Khan said that "Zaheen Tahira is very much alive and is currently admitted in the coronary care unit."

Zaheen Tahira died in Karachi on 9 July 2019 around 9:30 am.

== Filmography ==
Year	Title	Role	Notes
	Kaisi Hain Doorian		
	Rastay Dil Kay		
	Dil Moti Kay Mole		
	Masi Aur Malka		
	Adam Hawwa Aur Shaitan		
	Waqt Ka Asmaan		
	Kahaniyan		
	Zeenat		
	Asaawari		
	Sentenced for Love		Film
	Dowry List		Film
	Jeena Isi Ka Naam Hai		
	Manto Rama - Kamra No. 17		
	Aania		
	Khaali Ankhen		
	Ajaib Khana		
	Kaun Jaanay Kia Hona Hai		
	Aik Bechara		
	Anokha Bandhan		
	Show Shaa		
	Shee Jee		
	Amawas		
	Adha Chehra		
	Ilzam		
1993	Zarb Taqseem		
	Flight 033		
	Tumhari Bina		
1969	Khuda Ki Basti	Widow (Maa)	
1970	Hajj e Akbar		
1976	Shama	Khursheed	
1981	Harjaee		
1986	Dastak	Farooq's wife	
1989	Jangloos		
1990s	Khala Khairan		
1994	Aroosa		
1998	Samandar Hai Darmiyan		
2001	Kabhi Kabhi Pyaar Mein		
2002	Chaandni Raatain		
2002	Des Pardes		
2003	Murad		
2006	Manzil	Hani	
2006	Dil, Diya, Dehleez	Khala Solah anay	
2007	Vanee		
2008	Tair e Lahooti		
2009	Noorpur Ki Rani		
2009	Bebak		
2010	Tujh Pay Qurban	Dadi	
2011–12	Meray Qatil Meray Dildar		
2011	Umm-e-Kulsoom		
2012	Nikhar Gaye Gulab Sare	Badi Aapa	
2012	Mera Yaqeen	Bua	
2012–13	Raju Rocket		
2012–13	Baandi	Kamala's mother	
2013	Gohar-e-Nayab	Gohar's grandmother	
2014	Marasim	Durdana	
2014	Na Maloom Afraad	Shakeel's mother	feature film debut; cameo
2015	Piya Mann Bhaye	Iffat Bee	
2015–16	Teri Meri Jodi		
2016	Heer		
2016	Noor Jehan		
2016	Bin Roye	Rehmat Bi	
2016	Tum Milay		
2017–18	Mera Haq	Sajeela “Dadi”	
2018	Khalish	Neelofar's mother-in-law	
2018	Khuwabzaadi		
2018–19	Babban Khala Ki Betiyann	Babban Khala	
2019	Dil Kiya Karay		
2019	Barfi Laddu	Iqbal's mother	

== Awards and recognition ==
Year	Award	Category	Result	Ref.
1970	1st PTV Awards	Best Actress Special Award	Won	
1998	9th PTV Awards	Best Actress	Nominated	
2013	1st Hum Awards	Lifetime Achievement Award	Won	
2013	Tamgha-i-Imtiaz (Medal of Distinction)	Award by the President of Pakistan	Won	
