= Khuda Ki Basti =

Khuda Ki Basti (Urdu: خدا کی بستی), meaning God's Own City, may refer to:

- Khuda Ki Basti (Karachi) a neighborhood of Karachi, Sindh, Pakistan
- Khuda Ki Basti (film)
- Khuda Ki Basti (novel) by Shaukat Siddiqui
- Khuda Ki Basti (serial), based on the novel
