= Bandish (disambiguation) =

Bandish is a fixed, melodic composition in Hindustani vocal or instrumental music.

Bandish may also refer to:

- Bandish (1955 film), an Indian Hindi-language comedy film by Satyen Bose, starring Ashok Kumar and Meena Kumari
- Bandish (1980 Indian film), an Indian Hindi-language crime drama film by K. Bapaiah, starring Rajesh Khanna and Hema Malini
- Bandish (1980 Pakistani film), a Pakistani film
- Bandish (1996 film), an Indian Hindi-language romantic thriller film by Prakash Jha, starring Jackie Shroff and Juhi Chawla
- Bandish (1976 TV series), a Pakistani television series
- Bandish (2019 TV series), a Pakistani supernatural horror drama series
