= Arsh Muneer =

Pakistani actress

- Born: 28 May 1914; Lucknow, British India
- Died: 8 September 1998 (aged 84); Karachi, Pakistan
- Education: University of Karachi
- Occupations: Actress; Singer
- Years active: 1929 – 1998
- Children: 5
- Awards: Pride of Performance (1983)

Arsh Muneer was a Pakistani actress and singer who acted in television dramas. She played roles in the PTV dramas Khuda Ki Basti, Shama, Shehzori, Zair, Zabar, Pesh, Intezar Farmaiye and Ana.

== Early life ==
Arsh was born in 1914 in Lucknow, British India. She migrated to Karachi, Pakistan with her family. Later she completed her studies from the University of Karachi. She started working at Radio Pakistan in Lahore in 1947 after migrating to Pakistan. She also did stage shows and theatre plays.

== Career ==
While she was in British India, she had started working at All India Radio in Delhi. She made her debut as an actress on PTV in 1964, the same year that PTV was launched. She performed in dramas Zair, Zabar, Pesh, Jaidi and Eid Ka Jora. She also appeared in dramas Oh, Maaf Kijiye, Intezar Farmaiye, Kya Bane Baat and Fanooni Lateefay. She worked at Radio Pakistan for 30 years. She also appeared in movie Insan Badalta Hay. She also sang songs for Radio, dramas and films. Since then she appeared in dramas Ana, Ba Adab Ba Mulahiza Hoshiyar and Shehzori.

For her contributions towards the television industry, she was honored by the Government of Pakistan with the Pride of Performance in 1983. In 2005, Tributes were paid to her at the 1st Indus Drama Awards in Karachi by television personalities Moin Akhter, Babra Sharif, Faysal Qureshi, Humayun Saeed, Sultana Siddiqui and Adnan Siddiqui.

== Personal life ==
Arsh was married to the prominent Pakistani novelist Shaukat Thanvi and had five children.

== Death ==
She died on 8 September 1998 in Karachi and was buried at Sakhi Hassan Graveyard in Karachi, Pakistan.

== Filmography ==
=== Television ===
Year	Title	Role	Network
1969	Khuda Ki Basti	Sultana's aunt	PTV; Reportedly it was the first highly popular TV drama during which Pakistani streets looked deserted in 1969 and 1974 while people stayed home to watch it. The original Urdu-language novel was written by Shaukat Siddiqui in 1957. Later translated in 11 other languages.
1969	Eid Ka Jora	Khala	PTV
1973	Kiran Kahani	Chand's mother	PTV
1974	Zair, Zabar, Pesh	Laddan Khala	PTV
1974	Shehzori	Mali Khala	PTV
1976	Shama	Bua	PTV
1976	Intezar Farmaiye	Bano Apa	PTV
1977	Professor	Saib's wife	PTV
1981	Afshan	Chachi Jan	PTV
1982	Jaidi	Nunhi	PTV
1983	Silver Jubilee	Herself	PTV
1984	Ana	Begum	PTV
1985	Kese Kese Khwab	Aunty Flower	PTV
1986	Oh, Maaf Kijiye	Ama	PTV
1987	Ghar Rama	Amma	PTV
1988	Yeh Shadi Nahi Ho Gi	Anwar's mother	PTV
1990	Rozi	Bua Begum	PTV
1990	Ba Adab Ba Mulahiza Hoshiyar	Malika	PTV
1990	Kareem Saheb Ka Ghar	Noor Jahan	PTV
1991	Studio 2 1/9: Comedy Specialist Anwar Maqsood	Arsh Khala	PTV
1992	Fanooni Lateefay	Begum Rasheed	PTV
1993	Yes Sir, No Sir	Herself	PTV
1995	Kya Bane Baat	Salma's mother	PTV

=== Telefilm ===
Year	Title	Role
1986	Yeh Shadi Nahi Ho Gi	Amma

=== Film ===
Year	Film	Language
1955	Hamari Zuban	Urdu
1961	Insan Badalta Hai	Urdu
1968	Ham Bhi Parhay Hayn Rahon Mein	Urdu
1970	Parai Beti	Urdu
1972	Zindagi Aik Safar Hai	Urdu
1973	Baadal Aur Bijli	Urdu
1981	Kiran Aur Kali	Urdu

== Awards and recognition ==
Year	Award	Category	Result	Title	Ref.
1983	Pride of Performance	Award by the President of Pakistan	Won	Herself	
1998	PTV Award	Best Actress	Won	Herself	
