= Aroosa =

1994 Pakistani Urdu television drama

- Title screen
- عروسہ
- Genre: Family; Drama
- Based on: Aroosa by Zubaida Khatoon
- Written by: Fatima Surayya Bajia
- Directed by: Qasim Jalali
- Starring: Ghazala Kaifee; Shakeel; Mishi Khan; Adnan Siddiqui; Neelofar Abbasi; Ishrat Hashmi
- Country of origin: Pakistan
- Original language: Urdu
- No. of seasons: 1
- No. of episodes: 16

Original release
- Network: PTV
- Release: 1994 – 1994

Aroosa (Urdu: عروسہ, lit. 'Bride') is a 1994 Pakistani Urdu-language television drama that aired on PTV. Written by Fatima Surayya Bajia and directed by Qasim Jalali, it is an adaptation of the novel of the same name by Zubaida Khatoon. The serial ran for sixteen episodes in a single season and marked the television debuts of Adnan Siddiqui and Mishi Khan.

== Plot ==
Tofique (Shakeel), a barrister, maintains close ties with his younger sister (Neelofar Abbasi) and elder sister (Ishrat Hashmi) while neglecting his wife, Anjum (Ghazala Kaifee). He divorces Anjum shortly after the birth of their daughter, Uroosa (Mishi Khan). His subsequent marriage to an educated woman generates tensions within the household, as his sisters struggle to accept her.

== Cast ==
- Ghazala Kaifee as Anjum
- Shakeel as Tofique
- Mishi Khan as Uroosa
- Adnan Siddiqui as Shehryar
- Neelofar Abbasi as Choti Aapa
- Ishrat Hashmi as Naeema
- Rizwan Wasti as Rafi
- Sultana Zafar as Atiya
- Mazhar Ali as Aftab
- Zaheen Tahira as Khala Jee
- Humayun Mehboob as Munir
- Ayesha Khan as Shireen
- Nafees Hassan as Salma
- Safia Khairi as Dadi
- Shama Junejo as Arifa
- Zafar Ali as Zawar
- Subhani Ba Yunus as Doctor

== Production ==
=== Casting ===
The role of Shehryar was first offered to Aijaz Aslam, who declined owing to his studies; it was subsequently given to Adnan Siddiqui, for whom the serial became his television debut.

== Reception and legacy ==
In 2014, Dawn News included Aroosa in its list of the twenty most popular Pakistani television dramas of all time. The serial is also frequently cited as the breakthrough role of Adnan Siddiqui, who continued to refer to it as the starting point of his acting career in later interviews.
