= Zair Zabar Paish =

Pakistani television series

- Title screen
- زیر زبر پیش
- Genre: Comedy; Drama
- Written by: Haseena Moin
- Directed by: Ishrat Ansari
- Starring: Roohi Bano; Shakeel
- Country of origin: Pakistan
- Original language: Urdu
- No. of seasons: 1
- No. of episodes: 13

Production
- Producers: Shireen Khan; Zaheer Khan

Original release
- Network: PTV
- Release: 1974 – 1974

Zair Zabar Paish (Urdu: زیر زبر پیش, lit. 'Topsy-Turvy') is a 1974 Pakistani television series written by Haseena Moin, directed by Ishrat Ansari, and produced by Shireen Khan and Zaheer Khan. It aired on PTV and consists of 13 episodes.

== Synopsis ==
The series follows Sabeen (Roohi Bano) and Khuram (Shakeel), two young people from wealthy families who each have their own aspirations. Khuram faces pressure from his mother to marry, while Sabeen lives with her foster mother, who is devoted to her happiness.

== Cast ==
- Roohi Bano as Sabeen
- Shakeel as Khuram
- Arsh Muneer as Laddan Khala
- Begum Khurshid Mirza as Sabeen's mother
- Zeenat Yasmeen as Saira
- Ishrat Hashmi as Munni
- Feroz Zaidi as Jamali
- Jamshed Ansari as Shujat
- Zafar Masood as Jamil
- Qazi Wajid as Kareem
- Mahmood Ali as a grocery store salesman

== Production ==
=== Casting ===
The series marked Begum Khurshid Mirza's second collaboration with writer Haseena Moin, following Kiran Kahani, and her second on-screen appearance alongside Roohi Bano.
