= Hasan Rizvi =

Hasan Rizvi may refer to:

- Hasan Rizvi (artist), Pakistani artist, host, and choreographer
- Hasan Askari Rizvi, Pakistani political scientist and military analyst
- Hasan Azhar Rizvi, Pakistani jurist
