= Khuda Ki Basti (TV series) =

Pakistani television drama series

- Genre: Drama
- Based on: Khuda Ki Basti by Shaukat Siddiqui
- Starring: Zaheen Tahira; Qazi Wajid; Zafar Masood; Andaleeb; Mahmood Ali; Zahoor Ahmed; Yasmeen Tahir; Subhani ba Yunus; Shakeel Chughtai; Zahoor Ahmed; Tauqir Fatima; Iqbal Tareen; Behroze Sabzwari; Rizwan Wasti; Munawwar Sultana; Arsh Muneer; Saqib Sheikh
- Country of origin: Pakistan
- Original language: Urdu

Production
- Producers: Ishrat Ansari, Rasheed Umar Thanvi
- Production company: PTV

Original release
- Network: PTV
- Release: July 1969

Khuda Ki Basti (Urdu: خدا کی بستی, lit. 'God's Own Land') is a serial produced by Pakistan Television, first in July 1969 and then again in 1974, based on the novel Khuda Ki Basti by Shaukat Siddiqui.

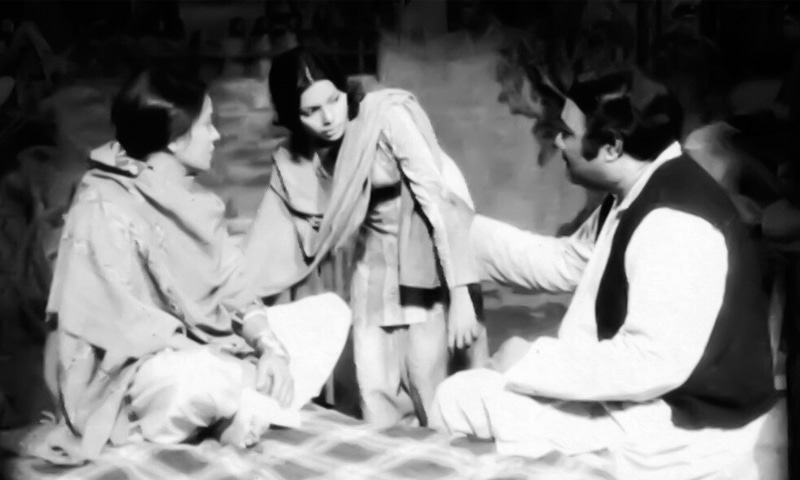
Zaheen Tahira, Munawwar Sultana and Zahoor Ahmed in the 1974 production of Khuda Ki Basti

It broke records for popularity in Pakistan. One TV critic in a major English-language newspaper in Pakistan called it "one of the oldest and greatest dramas in the history of Pakistani television."

== Story ==
The drama depicts the life of a poor but respectable family, which settles in a new slum after the independence of Pakistan in 1947 and the struggles in the lives of poor people living there. Here it is related to all kinds of social, economic problems and the intrigues of powerful people. In this drama, the harsh realities of life, the helplessness of the weak, the exploitative behavior of the powerful, the arbitrary behavior of the contractors of religion, so every aspect of our society was present. That is why this drama was the most popular drama of its time.

== First production in 1969 ==
Initially, Khuda Ki Basti was produced in November 1969 by Pakistan Television, 26 episodes of 25 minutes each, by producer Ishrat Ansari. Some episodes were produced by Rasheed Umar Thanvi at Karachi TV — that small and historic studio "A" which still stands galore at the center. There was an advisory committee of Pakistan Television comprising a panel of famous intellectuals: Faiz Ahmed Faiz, Jamiluddin Aali, and Shaukat Siddiqui, to ensure the perfection of the adaptation of the novel into drama.

== Second production in 1974 ==
In 1974, Prime Minister Zulfikar Ali Bhutto directed a re-telecast of Khuda Ki Basti, as it was Bhutto's favourite serial with a mass appeal and message. But Pakistan Television had some problems as the video tape recordings of the drama on spool in 1969 had long been erased due to new videotape scarcity and the need to re-record some other new programmes on those spools. Zulfikar Ali Bhutto insisted that the serial must be re-telecast, even if a fresh recording is essential.

The 1974 version of re-recorded Khuda Ki Basti was a 50-minute episode that lasted 13 weeks and had the same impact as the 1969 version. It was Khuda Ki Basti and nothing else for the viewers. TV directors Bakhtiyar Ahmed and Qasim Jalali did a fine job. This time around, the entire serial has been well maintained by Pakistan Television, with a repeat telecast in 1990, which termed the adaptation of Shaukat Siddiqui's novel Khuda Ki Basti "Mother of All Serials" at Pakistan Television Corporation.

== Produced by GeoTv ==
Geo has also released Khuda Ki Basti, which was produced by Rashid Sami (Kohinoor Studio). In this, Sohail Asghar was cast in the role of Niaz.

== Cast ==
- Behroze Sabzwari as Nosha (1974 version)
- Zaheen Tahira as Nosha's mother (1974 version)
- Munawwar Sultana as Sultana (1974 version)
- Qazi Wajid as Raja (1974 version)
- Mahmood Ali as Kaale Sahab (1974 version)
- Zahoor Ahmed as Niaz (1974 version)
- Subhani ba Yunus as Mistri Abdullah (1974 version)
- Arsh Muneer as Harmazzi (Sultana's aunt) (1974 version)
- Shakeel Chughtai as Shami (1974 version)
- Saqib Sheikh as Salman (1974 version)
- Mohammad Yousaf as Khan Bahadar (1974 version)
- Yousaf Ali as Nazeera (1974 version)
- Fareed Khan as Raffu (1974 version)
- Kazim Pasha as Safdar Bashir (1974 version)
- Shamim Hasan as Lallan (1974 version)
- Wakeel Farooqui as Inspector (1974 version)
- S.M. Saleem as Ali Ahmed (1974 version)
- Imtiaz Ahmed as Roshan Khan (1974 version)
- Zafar Siddiqui as Doctor Motu (1974 version)
- Liaqat Durrani as Ronaq Ali (1974 version)
- Aslam Latar as Shakir (1974 version)
- Raju Jameel as Jaffri (1974 version)
- Yasmeen Tahir as Mrs. Kamal (1974 version)
- M. Warsi as Lotan (1974 version)
- Rizwan Wasti as Kamal (1969 version)
- Zafar Masood as Munir (Nosha) (1969 version)
- Tauqir Fatima as Sultana (1969 version)
- Andaleeb as Mrs. Kamal (1969 version)
- Iqbal Tareen as Salman (1969 version)

== See also ==
- Khuda Ki Basti, a neighborhood of Karachi, Sindh, Pakistan
- Khuda Ki Basti, a novel by Shaukat Siddiqui on which the serial is based
