= Gulab Chandio =

Pakistani television and film actor (1958–2019)

- گلاب چانڈیو
- Born: Ghulam Mohammad Gulab; 6 January 1958; Shahmir Chandio village, Nawabshah district, Pakistan
- Died: 18 January 2019 (aged 61); Gulshan-e-Iqbal, Karachi, Pakistan
- Occupation: Actor
- Years active: 1980–2016
- Known for: Noori Jam Tamachi; Marvi; Chand Grehan; Sadori; Tipu Sultan: The Tiger Lord
- Political party: Pakistan Tehreek-e-Insaf
- Awards: Pride of Performance Award (2016)

Ghūlām Muḥammad Gūlāb( Sindhi محمد چانڊيو) ,(6 January 1958 – 18 January 2019), commonly known as Gulab Chandio, was a Pakistani television and film actor. He starred in more than 300 Urdu and Sindhi dramas and 6 films.

== Early life and education ==
Gulab was born on 6 January 1958 in Shahmir Chandio village, Nawabshah district, in a farming household.

He completed his school and intermediate education in the village. In 1976, he shifted to Karachi and got a clerk's job in the food department. In 1978, he returned to Nawabshah. He had been jailed for taking part in protests after Zulfikar Ali Bhutto's execution.

== Acting career ==
Gulab emerged as a television actor in the early 1980s and started his career in Sindhi dramas. In 1982, he made his debut with the Sindhi drama Biyo Shaks (The Other Man). Another source states that his first drama was Khan Sahib (1980). He appeared in various plays and serials, including Sindhi dramas Talash, Saam, Jungle, Jiyapo, Mittia ja Manhoo, and Ghulam, and Urdu serials Zeenat, Rawish, Noori Jam Tamachi, Tipu Sultan, and Saagar ka Aansoo.

He was known for Noori Jam Tamachi, Marvi and Chand Grehan. He also worked in theatre plays and films. His first film was Dushman in which he played the role of an actor. He also played the leading character in another Sindhi film Muhib Sheedi (1990). He also appeared in Syed Noor's Sargam (1995).

== Political career ==
Gulab contested the Pakistani general elections from Nawabshah and Karachi twice but lost both times. In 2016, he joined the Pakistan Tehreek-i-Insaf.

== Awards and recognition ==
In 2016, he was awarded the President's Pride of Performance Award for his services in art and drama.

== Death ==
He died in Gulshan-e-Iqbal, Karachi on 18 January 2019. Gulab was a heart patient with chronic diabetes.
