= Hawain =

Pakistani television series

- Title screen
- ہوائیں
- Genre: Tragedy; Family; Drama
- Written by: Asghar Nadeem Syed, Farzana Nadeem Syed
- Directed by: Haider Imam Rizvi
- Starring: Talat Hussain; Ghazala Kaifee; Huma Nawab; Komal Rizvi; Qazi Wajid
- Theme music composer: Jawed Allah Ditta
- Country of origin: Pakistan
- Original language: Urdu
- No. of seasons: 1
- No. of episodes: 21

Original release
- Network: PTV
- Release: 1995 – 1995

Hawain, also Hawaian (Urdu: ہوائیں; transl. The Winds) is a 1995 Pakistani television drama serial written by Asghar Nadeem Syed and Farzana Nadeem Syed and directed by Haider Imam Rizvi. Produced by the Pakistan Television Corporation, the serial ran for 21 episodes and centres on a family whose patriarch is arrested on a false charge of murder.

The serial featured an ensemble cast led by Talat Hussain, Ghazala Kaifee, Huma Nawab and Qazi Wajid, and marked the acting debut of singer and actress Komal Rizvi. Commentators have described Hawain as among the more widely followed PTV dramas of the mid-1990s, noting its socio-political undertones.

At the time of its original broadcast, some viewers drew parallels between the serial's central narrative and the trial of former prime minister Zulfikar Ali Bhutto and the subsequent political struggle of his daughter Benazir Bhutto. Neither the writer nor the network has confirmed such a connection.

== Plot ==
The story follows Shehnaz, a schoolteacher, and her daughters Saima and Asma, whose lives are upended when her husband Meer Muhammad is arrested and charged with a murder he did not commit. Much of the narrative centres on Shehnaz's efforts to support her family and clear her husband's name, while the daughters come of age amid the social stigma and legal pressures surrounding the case. Critics have read Meer Muhammad's imprisonment and eventual walk to the gallows as an allegorical depiction of the powerlessness of the rural poor in the face of feudal authority in Sindh.

== Cast ==
- Talat Hussain as Meer Muhammad
- Ghazala Kaifee as Shehnaz
- Huma Nawab as Saima
- Komal Rizvi as Asma
- Qazi Wajid as Doctor Aarfi
- Kaiser Khan as Raees Suleman
- Mahmood Ali as Wakeel
- Ishrat Hashmi as Masi Khyber Mail
- Mehmood Akhtar as Meer Qudratullah
- Fareed Nawaz Baloch as Raees Eshan
- Anwar Solangi as Qadir Bilji
- Abdullah Kadwani as Aleem
- Mona Junejo as Bhajai
- Mumtaz Kanwal as Mehru
- Anil Bhatti as Suleman's PA
- Aslam Latar as Deputy

== Reception and legacy ==
Hawain has since been listed among notable PTV productions of the 1990s in Pakistani press retrospectives on classic Urdu television drama. Talat Hussain's performance as the wrongfully accused Meer Muhammad is frequently cited as one of the defining roles of his television career. For Komal Rizvi, the role of Asma served as her entry into acting before she established a parallel career in music and television hosting.
