= Taleem-e-Balighan =

Pakistani television series

- Title screen
- تعلیمِ بالغاں
- Genre: Social satire
- Written by: Khawaja Moinuddin
- Starring: Mahmood Ali, Qazi Wajid, Subhani ba Yunus, Qasim Jalali, Razia Sultana, Bakhtiar, Agha Nasir
- Country of origin: Pakistan
- Original language: Urdu

Original release
- Network: Pakistan Television Corporation (PTV)
- Release: 1966

Taleem-e-Balighan (Urdu: تعلیمِ بالغاں, lit. 'Education for Adults') is a Pakistani social satire television serial that first aired on the Pakistan Television Corporation (PTV) in 1966. Written by Khawaja Moinuddin, it has been cited by critics as among the classics of Pakistani television.

== Plot and background ==
The series is set in a madrassa (school) in which illiterate adults receive education in a satirical and humorous setting. It draws on Muhammad Ali Jinnah's guiding principles of "unity, faith and discipline", a phrase that served as a rallying slogan during the Pakistan Movement in the 1940s and which is frequently invoked in Pakistani public discourse. The slogan is referenced within the serial in comedic contexts.

The work was originally written for Radio Pakistan in the 1950s, prior to the introduction of television broadcasting in Pakistan in November 1964. It was subsequently adapted for PTV and first broadcast in 1966.

== Cast ==
- Mahmood Ali as Maulvi Sahib, the class teacher
- Qazi Wajid
- Subhani ba Yunus
- Qasim Jalali
- Razia Sultana
- Bakhtiar
- Agha Nasir

== Reception ==
The serial brought public attention to questions of adult literacy and education in Pakistan, which have continued to be the subject of discussion.
