= Laikin =

2017 Pakistani television series

- لیکن
- Genre: Drama; Romance; Crime
- Written by: Sarwat Nazir
- Directed by: Naeem Qureshi
- Starring: Ali Abbas; Sarah Khan; Farhan Ahmed Malhi; Faria Sheikh; Atiqa Odho; Beena Chaudhary; Firdous Jamal; Ghazala Kaifee; Nida Mumtaz
- Country of origin: Pakistan
- Original language: Urdu
- No. of seasons: 1
- No. of episodes: 24

Production
- Producer: Kolachi Media

Original release
- Network: A-Plus TV
- Release: 27 April – 5 October 2017

Laikin (Urdu: لیکن, lit. 'However') is a Pakistani television series aired on A-Plus TV. It features Ali Abbas, Sarah Khan and Farhan Ahmed Malhi. Premiering on 27 April 2017, Laikin ended its run on 5 October 2017 after telecasting 24 episodes. The series marks the second appearance of Indian actress Sara Khan after Bay Khudi (2016).

== Cast ==
- Ali Abbas as Pervaiz
- Sarah Khan as Hadia
- Farhan Ahmed Malhi as Hashim
- Atiqa Odho
- Beena Chaudhary
- Firdous Jamal
- Ghazala Kaifee
- Fariya Hassan as Kiran
- Muhammad Awais Waseer
- Shazia Qaiser as Hamna (Adeel's mother)
- Sajid Shah
- Nida Mumtaz as Amber (Kiran's mother)
- Haider Raza
- Akhtar Ghazali
- Farhat Naseer
- Tanveer Abbas
- Nasreen Qureshi
- Naeem Sheikh
