= Rizwan Wasti =

Pakistani actor (1937–2011)

Rizwan Wasti رضوان واسطی
- Born: Syed Rizwan Wasti; 1937; Lahore, Punjab, British India
- Died: 24 January 2011 (aged 73–74); Karachi, Sindh, Pakistan
- Education: Sindh Muslim Law College
- Occupations: Television actor; Banker; Newscaster
- Years active: 1953 - 2011
- Spouse: Tahira Wasti (wife)
- Children: 2, including Laila Wasti (daughter)
- Relatives: Maria Wasti (niece); Fahad Rehmani

Syed Rizwan Wasti (1937 – 24 January 2011) was a Radio Pakistan, Karachi's radio news broadcaster and a film and television actor.

== Early life ==
Rizwan Wasti was born in 1937 at Lahore but his family later moved to Karachi where he received his Bachelor of Law degree from Sindh Muslim Law College in Karachi.

== Career ==
He first worked for Radio Pakistan as an English news broadcaster in 1953 at age sixteen, making him the youngest newscaster of the sub-continent where he initially learned how to use and control his voice for news media broadcasts. He worked at Radio Pakistan for sixteen years. Then he moved on to acting in the Pakistani television drama serials in the late 1960s, 1970s, 1980s and 1990s and played over 200 roles in various dramas such as Afshan, Shaheen and Khuda Ki Basti. Noted TV actor Talat Hussain commented after his death, "He was a distinguished name in the broadcasting world, a man who had his own distinct style."

== Personal life ==
He was also a banker by profession and he worked as a vice president at National Bank of Pakistan from where he retired in 1996. He was married to TV actress Tahira Wasti and had three children including two sons and actress Laila Wasti is his daughter. Famous television actress Maria Wasti is his niece.

== Illness and death ==
Rizwan Wasti had prolonged illness from which he died on 24 January 2011 at age 73. He was laid to rest at the Gizri graveyard in DHA.

== Filmography ==
=== Television series ===
- Khuda Ki Basti (1969–1974)
- Shama (TV drama serial), as 'Judge Akhtar Hussain'
- Afshan (TV drama serial)
- Ana
- Aabgeenay (TV drama serial)
- Kali Deemak
- Aagahi (TV drama serial)
- Hasina-E Alam
- Eid Flight
- Aik Raat
- StarNite
- Tabeer
- Gurez
- Kashkol
- Eaitraf
- Usay Bhool Ja
- Madan-e-Mohabbat
- Aa Mere Pyar ki Khusboo
- Aroosa
- Shaheen
- Aawazain
- Jinnah Se Quaid
- Saith And Company
- Tipu Sultan
- Ghazi Shaheed
- Chai Time (Tea Time)

=== Telefilm ===
- Operation Dwarka 1965

=== Film ===
- Lap of Actress (TV Film)
- Insaf Aur Qanoon

== Bibliography ==
Rizwan authored a critically book titled Sher Shah Suri about the Afghan general and he also wrote a book of poems called A chorus of echoes.
