= Rabia Noreen =

Pakistani actress

- رابعہ نورین
- Born: 2 December 1965 (age 60); Karachi, Pakistan
- Education: University of Karachi
- Occupation: Actress
- Years active: 1987 – present
- Spouse: Abid Ali (m. 2006; died 2019)
- Relatives: Sabahat Adil (sister); Tariq Khan (brother)

Rabia Noreen is a Pakistani actress.

== Career ==
Rabia made her debut as an actress on PTV in 1987 and is known for her role in the drama Zeenat. She has also appeared in dramas Khaali Haath, Anaya Tumhari Hui, Kabhi Socha Na Tha, Laa, Mera Khuda Janay, Dil-e-Muztar and Mere Meherbaan. Since then she has appeared in dramas Umm-e-Haniya, Baaghi, Kasa-e-Dil and Laapata.

== Personal life ==
Rabia was actor Abid Ali's second wife and was married to him until his death.

== Filmography ==
=== Television ===
Year	Title	Role	Network
1989	Jangloos	Sardara	PTV
1991	Zeenat	Zeenat	PTV
1992	Dard Kay Faslay	Khalda	PTV
1994	Bazgasht	Zakia	PTV
1996	Babar	Ayesha Sultan	PTV
1996	Noori Jam Tamachi	Surayya	PTV
1996	Ilzam	Aasia	PTV
1997	Tasveer	Fozia	PTV
1998	Kangan	Nuzhat	PTV
1999	Janasheen	Shama	PTV
2006	Sadori	Mai	PTV
2007	Saheli	Nida	PTV
2010	Masi Aur Malika	Samina's mother	Geo TV
2010	Dohri	Amma Begum	ARY Digital
2010	Adhoore Dastaan	Humayoun's mother	Hum TV
2010	Buri Aurat	Zarina	Geo TV
2010	Dil-e-Abad	Sohail's mother	Hum TV
2011	Maat	Afia	Hum TV
2012	Maa Aur Mamta	Amma Ji	PTV
2012	AmarBail	Tanveer's wife	PTV
2012	Kaliyan Mere Aangan Ki	Humera	Express Entertainment
2012	Talafi	Falak's mother	PTV
2012	Khawhish-e-Benaam	Hafsa	Geo Entertainment
2013	Dil-e-Muztar	Zoya's mother	Hum TV
2014	Janey Kiun	Nusrat	ARY Digital
2014	Mere Meherbaan	Shaista	Hum TV
2014	Zara Aur Mehrunnisa	Zain's mother	ARY Digital
2014	Laa	Sanam	Hum TV
2014	Na Katro Pankh Mere	Sabeen	ARY Zindagi
2015	Anaya Tumhari Hui	Samina	Geo TV
2016	Kyun Mili Yeh Saza	Salma	A-Plus
2016	Khoat	Maira's mother	ARY Digital
2016	Wafa	Wafa's mother	Geo TV
2017	Khaali Haath	Mishi's mother	Geo Entertainment
2017	Kabhi Socha Na Tha	Naila	Geo TV
2017	Baaghi	Samreen	Urdu 1
2018	Mera Khuda Janay	Razia	Geo TV
2018	Muhabbat Dard Bunti Hai	Sania	PTV
2018	Umm-e-Haniya	Naila	Geo Entertainment
2019	Mera Qasoor	Gul Bano	ARY Digital
2019	Makafaat Season 1	Nausheen Mother-in-law	Geo TV
2020	Makafaat Season 2	Rizwana	Geo Entertainment
2020	Aik Aur Munafiq	Tahira	Geo Entertainment
2020	Kasa-e-Dil	Fahmida	Geo TV
2021	Makafaat Season 3	Raheela	Geo Entertainment
2021	Laapata	Nighat	Hum TV
2021	Banno	Arfah	Geo TV
2022	Angna	Taimoor's mother	ARY Digital
2022	Nehar	Zohra	Hum TV
2022	Ant Ul Hayat	Shaista	Hum TV
2023	Mere Ban Jao	Hajra	Hum TV
2023	Abdullah	Waseem's mother	Geo Entertainment
2023	Sirat-e-Mustaqeem Season 3	Saqib's mother	ARY Digital
2023	Ishq Murshid	Nargis	Hum TV
2023	Namak Haram	Sadia	Hum TV
2024	Makafaat 5	Amida	Geo Entertainment
2024	Tum Bin Kesay Jiyen	Farida	ARY Digital
2024	Jaan Se Pyara Juni	Suraiya	Hum TV
2024	Shehzadi House	Iqbal Bano	Green Entertainment
2025	Mann Marzi	Sajida	Geo TV
2025	Ishq Tum Se Hua	Fehmida	Green Entertainment
2025	Main Zameen Tu Aasmaan	Zakiya	Green Entertainment
2025	Visaal-E-Ishq	Nafeesa	Green Entertainment
2025	Shikanja	Shehnaz	Geo TV
2025	Sazawaar	Rubina	ARY Digital
2026	Musafat	Naheed	Hum TV

=== Telefilm ===
Year	Title	Role
2011	Tinkon Ka Ashiyan	Qudsia
2013	Zara Si Aurat	Uroosa's mother

=== Film ===
Year	Title	Role
2004	Mother of Desert	Nandni
2007	Help of a Ghost	Rabia Naureen
2013	I Am Yours	Samina
