= Jackson Heights (TV series) =

Pakistani TV series

- Title screen
- Genre: Drama
- Written by: Vasay Chaudhry
- Directed by: Mehreen Jabbar
- Creative director: Wajahatullah Khan
- Starring: Adeel Husain; Aamina Sheikh; Marina Khan; Noman Ejaz; Adnan Jaffar; Neelofar Abbasi; Naghma; Ali Kazmi
- Opening theme: "Laiyaan Laiyaan" by Saad Sultan
- Country of origin: Pakistan
- Original language: Urdu
- No. of episodes: 27

Production
- Executive producer: Nadeem Baig
- Producers: Humayun Saeed; Shahzad Nasib
- Production locations: Jackson Heights, Queens
- Cinematography: Nausheen Dadabhoy
- Camera setup: Multi-camera setup
- Running time: 40 minutes
- Production company: Six Sigma Plus

Original release
- Network: Urdu1
- Release: 19 September 2014 – 20 March 2015

Jackson Heights (Urdu: جیکسن ہائیٹس) is a 2014 Pakistani light comedy-drama serial that follows the lives of overseas Pakistanis and Indians living in the Jackson Heights neighborhood of New York City in Queens. It is directed by Mehreen Jabbar, written by Vasay Chaudhry and produced by Humayun Saeed and Shehzad Nasib. The serial features an ensemble cast including Marina Khan, Adeel Hussain, Aamina Sheikh, Noman Ejaz, Ali Kazmi, Adnan Jaffar, Naghma and Neelofar Abbasi.

The plot of the serial revolves around six expatriates working in Jackson Heights in New York City.

== Plot ==
The story revolves around six Pakistanis living in Jackson Heights, a suburb in Queens, New York.

Salma works very hard at Haseena Beauty Salon. The owner of the salon, Aalia, is a good friend of Salma's. Salma stays with her mother-in-law and step-daughter Iman and is the sole breadwinner of the house. Her mother-in-law is cruel to her and makes unkind remarks regarding everything she does. Later in the series it is revealed that Salma's husband Sikandar is a convict doing time in prison and has been released early due to good behaviour. Sikandar is abusive towards Salma and has no regular source of income. He gambles and mugs people and sells stolen watches and cell phones in the gray market.

Imran Bhatti is a cab driver with a heart of gold. All the other cabbies of the neighbourhood admire and respect Bhatti very much. Bhatti came to New York fifteen years back on a tourist visa and has never been able to go back to Pakistan because of his illegal visa status. Bhatti has told everyone in his family that he owns a cab company in the US. His ailing mother lives in Pakistan with his older brother and sister-in-law who treat her badly.

Bhatti is married to an American woman Kathy as part of a citizenship deal. Kathy is mean and rude towards Bhatti. Kathy's daughter Isabella shares this attitude with her mother. Her son Mark however, is close to Bhatti and looks up to him.

Salma meets Bhatti once when she rides his cab and is really annoyed with his over friendly and talkative behaviour. He later helps her when a bunch of goons are chasing and even teasing her while she is returning from work. They become good friends after this incident. Aalia also likes Bhatti very much because of his good nature. Bhatti shares stories of his personal life with Salma here and there but she never shares anything with him only until one day he spots her walking down the street with Emaan. One late night, Bhatti gets mugged by Sikander and his cousin Kash but Bhatti registers Sikander's face oblivious to the fact that he is Salma's husband. He later recognizes him when he visit's Salma's house to return her wallet that she had left in his cab.

Also staying with Bhatti's mother is Jamshed, the son of Bhatti's only dead sister who has completed his graduation. Jamshed has a girlfriend Asma who is his next door neighbour. Asma wants Jamshed to stay in Pakistan and look for a job but he is obsessed with going to the US to making a better life for himself. His US visa is in processing and on account of that he rejects the offer of a government job. Eventually his six-month tourist visa is approved and he travels to New York leaving behind his ailing grand mother, Asma, and his friend Nadir. He believes setting foot in New York would end all his financial problems.

Michelle is a Pakistani Christian who runs a restaurant in Jackson Heights. She has an icy cold attitude towards all Desis. The cabbies of the neighbourhood visit her diner everyday and are all intimidated by Michelle. The only cabbie she truly likes and respects is Bhatti. It is later revealed that Michelle was married to a Pakistani who later divorced her and his family took possession of the property she had inherited from her late father. Michelle's only surviving family is her sister Maria who stays in London. Michelle's close friend and confidant is Rizwan, a banker from India. Rizwan is in love with Michelle but has never explicitly told her. After Rizwan's sister visits him and persuades him he proposes to Michelle on his birthday but she rejects. Devastated, Rizwan moves away to Chicago.

Jamshed travels to New york only to realize how tough it is to survive there. He finds out that Bhatti is only a cab driver and does not own a cab company. Due to his tourist visa he is unsuccessful in finding any job for himself and Kathy also throws him out of her house thinking he was trying to make advances towards Izzy. Bhatti then requests Michelle to let Jamshed rent her apartment above the restaurant and Michelle reluctantly agrees. Nadir calls Jamshed and tries to make him understand that Asma misses him and he should come back to Pakistan but Jamshed ignores. Eventually Nadir falls for Asma and proposes to her and she accepts.

Slowly Michelle starts liking Jamshed and hires him as a waiter at the restaurant. Jamshed shows promise at work and gets into Michelle's good books much to the dismay of her other staff. He starts flirting with her but she rejects his advances. On one depressed day Michelle talks to Rizwan about how she pushes people away to avoid getting hurt and Rizwan advises her to follow her heart. She then starts reciprocating Jamshed's romantic advances despite her better judgement and the age gap between them. She promotes him to restaurant manager and values his advice. Jamshed starts taking advantage of this and starts having his own way.

Sikandar with his cousin Kash gambles at a local casino and loses and owes a sum of $25,000 to the owner who are part of money laundering Mafia. Salma loves and cares about Iman dearly and has saved her wedding jewellery for her college fees. Sikandar, pretending to have started caring about Salma, tries to trick Salma in giving him the jewellery so that he can sell it and pay back the amount. Salma overhears Sikandar's conversation with Kash and takes Bhatti's help in putting the jewellery in her bank locker. Cathy spots Bhatti with Salma a few times and suspects they are having an affair. Kash also catches them walking in the park and tells Sikandar and his mom that Salma is cheating on Sikandar with Bhatti. Sikandar, outraged, hits Salma and forbids her from going out of the house. Emaan, seeing this, comes to her stepmother's rescue and threatens Sikandar about informing the police. Eventually, Salma and Bhatti both realize that they are in fact in love with each other and during one of their meeting Sikander comes with a gun and tries to shoot Bhatti only to have been hit by a car.

Salma takes him to the hospital and takes care of him and to pay off the hospital bills she is forced to sell her jewellery. She also informs Bhatti about the $25000 debt Sikander is in. Bhatti later informs her that he has spoken to the casino owner and they will not trouble Sinkander anymore. While Salma tells Sikandar that she plans to divorce him and marry Bhatti once he recovers from his injury, she also tells him how Bhatti has settled dues with the casino Mafia. Sikandar feels bad about what how he has treated Salma and shows signs that he has had a change of heart. Emaan one day overhears her grandmother and father talking about how Salma is going to leave. Emaan runs away and confronts Salma pleading her to not leave since Sikandar is becoming a better man. Salma promises her that she will not leave.

Jamshed later proposes to Michelle and she accepts. Bhatti is very unhappy with this development but Jamshed insults him and sends him away. Jamshed starts pushing Michelle for getting married, not even allowing her to inform Maria. Michelle when tells Rizwan about this, he is heartbroken and starts suspecting that Jamshed is only doing this for nationality. He tries to warn Michelle but she does not believe him. Jamshed also makes her think that Rizwan is doing this because he is jealous of him since he is still in love with Michelle. The tiff between Jamshed and Rizwan makes Michelle very uncomfortable, Jamshed then starts to fake a friendship with Rizwan. Rizwan starts following Jamshed and learns that he is regularly visiting a lawyer. He understands that Jamshed is marrying Michelle only for citizenship and he does not love her. He tells Maria about the upcoming wedding and Michelle requests Jamshed to postpone it so that her sister can be a part of it. Jamshed gets agitated by this and thinks Rizwan has provoked her to make this decision. He gets a restraining order issued against Rizwan so that he cannot see Michelle.

Meanwhile, in Pakistan, Bhatti's mother becomes more and more sick and his brother does not get her treated. She starts crying and asking Bhatti to come back to Pakistan. Bhatti who has already divorced Kathy and decided to marry Salma tells his mom that he will come and bring her daughter-in-law with him. Salma tells him about how Emaan has asked her to not leave, Bhatti requests her to go with him to Pakistan and hands her a flight ticket he bought for her. Bhatti's mom goes comatose. He informs Jamshed but he refuses to go to Pakistan saying he is getting married in three weeks so he cannot fly. Bhatti heartbroken flies to Pakistan but Salma does not join him. She stays with her family for Emaan.

Bhatti reaches Pakistan but his mom is still comatose. He sees that his brother and his wife only care about the house and money and do not care about their mother. Bhatti's mother eventually passes away and Bhatti decided to give his share of the property to his brother and move on. Due to his illegal status he cannot go back to the US, so he starts a cab company in Pakistan.

On the day of Jamshed and Michelle's wedding, Jamshed's lawyer calls him and threatens him asking for more money. When he goes to meet him he tells him that Rizwan has paid him double the money to do this. When he reaches back to Michelle's apartment, he finds her hearing the phone message his lawyer has left for him. She finally sees that he only wanted to marry him for nationality and throws him out. Rizwan consoles her and asks her to marry him again but she refuses.

Four months later it is shown that Salma has started staying lost and disturbed and Emaan notices this. She understands that her mother is in love with Bhatti and misses him. Salma one day finds out that Bhatti had not only spoken to the Casino mafia but also paid them the sum of $25000 to save Sikander. Iman finally one day hands her divorce papers that are already signed by Sikander and gives Salma her blessings to fly to Pakistan.

Salma goes to meet Bhatti at his office and he gets really happy to see her.

Michelle asks Jamshed to come and see her. She informs him that she is moving to London and hands him some papers. She enrolls him in New York university so that he can fulfil his dream of having a good life in America.

== Cast ==
=== Main ===
- Noman Ejaz as Imran Bhatti; A Pakistani cab driver, married to an American lady and has been living in Jackson Heights for past many years
- Aamina Sheikh as Salma; A Pakistani Salon worker, lives in Jackson Heights who becomes victim of domestic abuse
- Adeel Hussain as Jamshed; an aspiring Pakistani bachelor and Bhatti's nephew, comes in the city to make it big
- Marina Khan as Michelle; a Pakistani Christian, runs a restaurant in the city
- Adnan Jaffar as Rizwan; An Indian Muslim and friend of Michelle who can't woo the love of his life
- Ali Kazmi as Sikandar; Salma's husband and a con man

=== Recurring ===
- Almaas Hussain as Emaan; Salma and Sikandar's daughter
- Mehar Jaffri as Aliya; Salma colleague in Salon
- Naghma as Imran's mother
- Neelofar Abbasi as Sikandar's mother
- Monsoon Bissell as Kathy (Bhatti's American wife)
- Ahmad Razvi as Javed (Bhatti's fellow cabbie)
- Taimur Syed as Cash (Sikandar's cousin)
- Taimoor Qureshi as Adnan (Supervisor in Michelle's restaurant)
- Alma Moos Nunez as Isabella (Kathy's daughter)
- Theo Van Golen as Mark (Kathy's son)
- Rida Asfahani
- Fahad Ahmad
- Tara Mehmood as Tanya (Rizwan's sister)
- Imran Mirza
- Zain Masood
- Ahtesham Khanira
- Ali Murawat
- Usman Mir
- Moin AHmad
- Nausheen Masood
- Qazim Raza
- Muhammad Arshad
- Aslam Mughal
- Shehryar Khan
- Zareen
- Asim Rajput

== International broadcast ==
The show was broadcast in India on Zindagi on 1 September 2015. It ended its run on 24 October 2015 and was a hit. It was also broadcast by &tv UK. The show was premiered in UK on 5 September 2016 and aired on weekdays. It was the first Urdu-language drama aired on the channel. In United States, the show was aired on Zee TV USA premiering 8 February 2016.

== Reception ==
=== Critical reception ===
The series received positive reviews from critics with praise towards the performances, script and direction. Bol News listed it as an underrated series. Nauman Ijaz's performance as "Bhatti Sahab" was highly praised. Something Haute praised the direction of Jabbar stating, "Despite being shot both in New York and Karachi, we didn’t get to see any technical blunders of continuity nor we saw any changes in expressions."

== Accolades ==
Date of ceremony	Award	Category	Recipient(s) and nominee(s)	Result	Ref.
September 30, 2015	Lux Style Awards	Best Original Soundtrack	Saad Sultan	Nominated	
