= Mishi Khan =

Pakistani film and television actress and host

Mishi Khan is a Pakistani film actress, television actress and TV host. She is famous for playing the titular role in the PTV drama Aroosa, which was her debut serial. She went on to star in numerous hit PTV dramas which have made her a household name. She also sang a titled named Mahiya and has worked with the singer Ali Haider.

== Career ==
Mishi began her career with PTV hit drama Aroosa. She also starred in other PTV dramas such as Ajaib Khana, Boota from Toba Tek Singh, Tipu Sultan: The Tiger Lord, and Andar Ki Baat. Over the years, she has done modeling, singing, drama production, hosting, and acting in films.

== Personal life ==
In 2025, Khan spoke out publicly about her views on her former colleagues and their actions and clashed with Kangana Ranaut.

She identifies as anti-Labubu, and considers the dolls as an artifact of witchcraft.

== Films ==
- Nikah (1998)
- Janaan (2016)

== Television ==
Year	Title	Channel
1992	Aroosa	PTV Home
1994	Barish Ke Baad	PTV Home
1996	Ajaib Khana	PTV Home
1997	Tipu Sultan: The Tiger Lord	PTV Home
1997	Andar Ki Baat	PTV Home
1998	PNS Ghazi Shaheed	PTV Home
1999	Boota from Toba Tek Singh	PTV Home
2006	Sharbati	PTV Home
2008	Sher Dil	ARY Digital
2012	Jannat Say Nikaali Hui Aurat	Geo TV
2012–2013	Saat Pardon Mein	Geo TV
2013	Nanhi	Geo TV
