= Pyar Ka Taraana =

- Directed by: Dev Anand
- Produced by: Dev Anand
- Starring: Akshay Anand; Mink Brar; Anita Ayoob
- Cinematography: Rajesh Patni
- Edited by: Babu Sheikh
- Music by: Raamlaxman
- Production companies: Navketan International; Sunico Productions
- Release date: 3 September 1993
- Running time: 2 hours 16 min
- Country: India
- Language: Hindi

Pyar Ka Taraana (lit. 'The Tune of Love') is a 1993 Bollywood drama film. The film starred Akshay Anand, Mink Brar, Anita Ayoob. The film was written and directed by Dev Anand.

== Cast ==
- Akshay Anand as Kim
- Mink Brar as Chanda
- Anita Ayoob as Pinky
- Manu Gargi as Gautam
- Girija Shankar as Prem
- Sushma Seth
- Shreeram Lagoo
- Reema Lagoo
- Sulbha Arya
- Rakesh Pandey
- Brij Gopal

== Soundtrack ==
M. G. Hashmat wrote all songs.

Song	Singer
"Pyar Ka Taraana"	Lata Mangeshkar
"Kitna Achha Hota"	Lata Mangeshkar
"Tumse Jo Kahoongi Woh"	Lata Mangeshkar, Udit Narayan
"Koi Jeetega, Koi Haarega"	S. P. Balasubrahmanyam, Preeti Singh, Udit Narayan
"Love Letter, Love Letter, Love Letter"	S. P. Balasubrahmanyam, Asha Bhosle, Udit Narayan
"Jane Ke Liye Kaise Kahoon Jaan-E-Jaan"	S. P. Balasubrahmanyam, Asha Bhosle
"Yeh Zindagi Hai Pyar Ka Taraana"	S. P. Balasubrahmanyam, Asha Bhosle
"Jab Bhi Maine"	S. P. Balasubrahmanyam
