= Ghazala Kaifee =

Pakistani actress

- Born: Ghazala Najam; 17 April 1960 (age 65); Karachi, Pakistan
- Education: University of Karachi
- Occupation: Actress
- Years active: 1976 – present
- Spouse: Nawab Kaifee (m. 1978)
- Children: 4

Ghazala Kaifee (née Najam) is a Pakistani actress. She has been one of the most popular and successful actresses in the country in the 1970s, 1980s and 1990s. She is known for her roles in the dramas Laikin, Qissa Meherbano Ka, Rasam, Ishq E Laa and Sinf-e-Aahan.

== Early life ==
Ghazala was born on 17 April 1960 in Karachi, Pakistan. She completed her studies from University of Karachi.

== Career ==
Kaifee started her acting career in 1976 with the title role in PTV's Shama which was written by Fatima Surayya Bajia. She was encouraged by Qasim Jalil to pursue a career in television when Bajia decided to cast her in her Shama.

In 1977 she was offered the lead role of Rita opposite Nadeem in film Aina by director Nazar-ul-Islam and written by Bashir Niaz but she refused it because her husband didn't wanted her to act in the film then the role was offered to Shabnam which she accepted the film was a Diamond Jubilee at the box office later Ghazala admitted that she regretted for refusing it when she saw the movie in cinema. She was noted for her roles in dramas Shama, Tipu Sultan: The Tiger Lord, Ana, Hawain, Aroosa and Brahim Ki Talaash. She also appeared in dramas Yeh Bhi Kisi Ki Bayti Hai, Janay Kyun, Chain Aye Na, Rasam, Rishtay Mohabbaton Kay and Laikin. Ghazala also appeared in the movie Article 370 as Mir's mother. Since then she appeared in dramas Ishq E Laa, Qissa Meherbano Ka and Sinf-e-Aahan.

== Personal life ==
Ghazala is married and has four children including three sons and one daughter and her youngest son named Hassan Kaifee is a reporter. Ghazala also set up a foundation called Foundation of Youth to help the poor. She and her husband were diagnosed with COVID-19 during the COVID-19 pandemic in Pakistan and went into quarantine then she and her husband recovered from coronavirus on 23 June 2020. Her son Ali Kaifee is the CEO of a leading International News Agency AK Broadcasts.

== Filmography ==
=== Television ===
Year	Title	Role	Network
1976	Shama	Shama	PTV
1983	Brahim Ki Talaash	Aapa Ji	PTV
1984	Ana	Rushna	PTV
1993	Yes Sir, No Sir	Herself	PTV
1994	Aroosa	Anjum	PTV
1997	Tipu Sultan: The Tiger Lord	Malka Fatima Fakhr-un-Nisa	PTV
1997	Hawain	Shehnaz	PTV
1999	Tawan	Noor Bano	PTV
2008	Brunch With Bushra Ansari	Herself	Geo News
2010	Rishtay Mohabbaton Kay	Sidra	Hum TV
2010	Chain Aye Na	Seep	Geo TV
2010	Yeh Bhi Kisi Ki Bayti Hai	Maryam	Geo Entertainment
2011	Kuch Meetha Ho Jaye	Ammi Ji	PTV
2014	Rasam	Asma	Geo TV
2014	Janay Kyun	Safia Begum	ARY Digital
2017	Ghareeb Zaadi	Husna	A-Plus
2017	Laikin	Nagma	A-Plus
2021	Qissa Meherbano Ka	Ghazala	Hum TV
2021	Star & Style	Herself	PTV Home
2021	Ishq E Laa	Sitwat	Hum TV
2021	Sinf-e-Aahan	Mrs. Safeer	ARY Digital
2023	Manjdhaar	Shagufta	Aur Life
2024	Diyar-e-Yaar	Bi Jaan	Green Entertainment

=== Telefilm ===
Year	Title	Role
1988	Eid Train	Nazia

=== Film ===
Year	Title	Role
2020	Article 370	Mir's mother

== Awards and nominations ==
Year	Award	Category	Result	Title	Ref.
1986	6th PTV Awards	Best Actress	Nominated	Ana	
