= Hasan Rizvi (artist) =

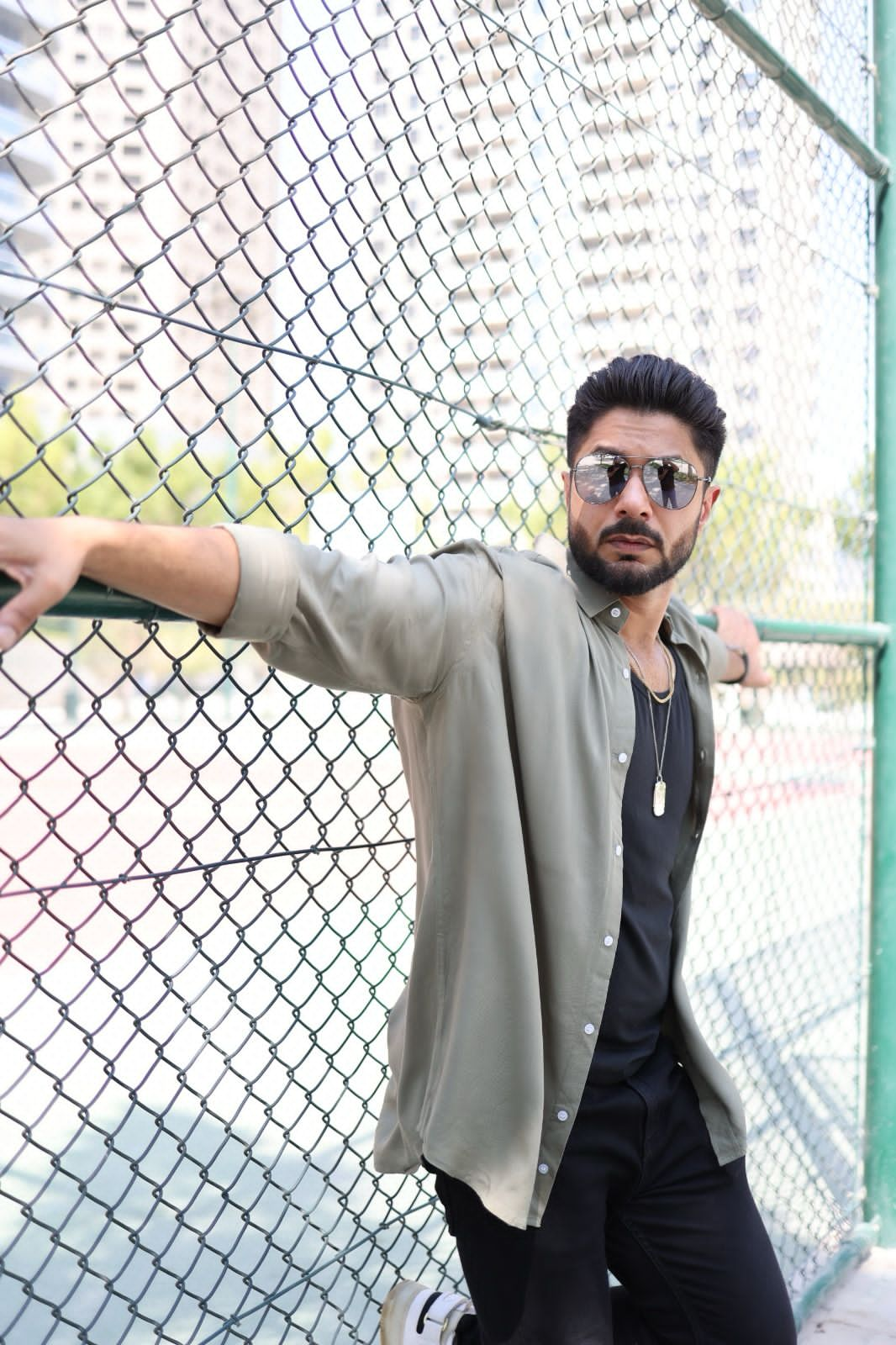
- Born: 1984 (age 41–42)
- Occupations: Artist; Host; Choreographer

Hasan Rizvi (born 1984) is a Pakistani artist, host, and choreographer.

== Early life and education ==
Hasan Rizvi was born in 1984. He holds a bachelor's degree with a major in economics. He is a brother of Komal Rizvi.

== Career ==
In 2010, the US Department of State designated Rizvi as the "Hip Hop Ambassador" from Pakistan.

In 2012, Rizvi was recognized for introducing "Cinema Live," a fusion of Hip-Hop, Bhangra, and Bollywood dance tableaus in Pakistan.

In 2016, Hasan Rizvi and his team launched a concert series and released six music videos through Cornetto Pop Rock. In the same year, Rizvi organized the Bridal Couture Week.

Over the years, Rizvi has worked as choreographer for films such as Main Hoon Shahid Afridi, Hijrat, and Lahore Se Aagay. He has also directed commercials for brands including Blue Band, Lipton, Nestle, Samsung, Tang, and Tapal Tea. He is also credited for his work on a musical project called Pepsi Unplugged. He has also hosted multiple events such as Oh! My Gosh, Oh! Behave, and Oh! So Pop, as part of the Oh! series.

Rizvi is also the founder of BodyBeat Group, which includes a health and fitness studio called BBRC and a dance studio called BodyBeat Productions.

== Choreography ==
- Naach
- Main Hoon Shahid Afridi
- Hijrat
- Lahore Se Aagay
- Bridal Couture Week
