= Rasam (TV series) =

Pakistani television series

- Genre: Social Drama; Family drama
- Developed by: S.Mukhtar Ahmed
- Written by: Samina Aijaz
- Directed by: Asim Ali
- Starring: Sumbul Iqbal; Junaid Khan; Hassan Niazi; Javaid Sheikh; Rija Ali
- Country of origin: Pakistan
- Original language: Urdu
- No. of seasons: 1
- No. of episodes: 17

Production
- Producers: Gold Bridge Media and Habib Jaan
- Production location: Karachi
- Editor: H.A Khan

Original release
- Network: Geo TV
- Release: 1 May – 11 December 2014

Rasam (English: Custom) is a 2014 Pakistani television drama serial directed by Asim Ali. It was premiered on 1 May 2017. The serial is written by Samina Aijaz and produced by Gold Bridge Media in collaboration with Habib Jaan. The serial features Sumbul Iqbal, Junaid Khan, Hassan Niazi and Javaid Sheikh in lead roles. The serial centers on how a mistake made in performing rituals and traditions changes the lives of Ali and Amber.

== Synopsis ==
Everything is going well until all is lost, not just for Ali (Junaid Khan) but for Amber (Sumbul Iqbal) as well and only over a stupid mistake committed in a mehndi ceremony by a family member which leaves everyone in shock. They say these Rasams (or traditions) are the flavor of our wedding ceremonies but not for Amber. What is it that the future holds for girls like Amber, isn't she a victim of these Rasams?

== Cast ==
- Sumbul Iqbal as Amber
- Junaid Khan as Ali
- Hassan Niazi as Shehzad
- Javed Sheikh as Sattar, Father of Amber
- Ghazala Kaifee as Asma, Mother of Amber
- Rija Ali as Tajwar, Sister of Ali
- Amir Qureshi as Asad, Husband of Tajwar
- Kaif Ghaznavi as Noreen, Second wife of Ali
- Humaira Ali as Yasmeen, Mother of Ali
- Ali Anwar as Ahmed, Brother of Amber
- Beena Chaudhary as Zahida, Phuppo of Ali
- Birjees Farooqui as Shehzad's mother
- Sonia Rao as Shela, Friend and colleague of Amber
- Mahrukh Rizvi as Reena, Love interest of Asad

== Interruption ==
In May 2014, Geo TV was banned by PEMRA for airing blasphemous content on Geo Entertainment in its morning show Utho Jago Pakistan. Therefore, the serial was on hiatus along with other serials of the channel for a few months.

== Reception ==
The serial could not do better on the ratings charts due to the unavailability of the channel in some parts of the country. It was also criticized by the viewers for its weak story line and flaws in direction.
