= Gangster (1994 film) =

- Poster
- Directed by: Dev Anand
- Written by: Dev Anand
- Produced by: Dev Anand
- Starring: Dev Anand; Manu Gargi; Mamta Kulkarni; Anita Ayoob
- Cinematography: Uday Burman
- Music by: Jatin-Lalit
- Production company: Navketan Films International
- Release date: 8 May 1994
- Country: India
- Language: Hindi

Gangster is a 1994 Hindi film. The movie starred Dev Anand as the lead actor. It also featured Mamta Kulkarni and Manu Gargi as the romantic pair of the movie.

== Plot ==
The story is about a priest, Father Pereira, who unwittingly becomes a witness to the rape and murder of a village woman by the rich man of the village, Chandulal Seth. Father Ferriera is framed for the crime by Chandulal Seth and is sent to the jail instead. During the jail time spent, Father Ferriera develops a good friendship with some of the jail mates. On release from the jail, he along with his former jail mates decide on taking revenge with Chandulal Seth, who is now one of the richest jewelers of the world.

== Cast ==
- Dev Anand as Father Pereira
- Mamta Kulkarni as Pooja
- Manu Gargi as Rahul
- Ajit as Chandulal Seth
- Sudhir as Jaichand
- Deepak Tijori as Harmesh
- Anita Ayoob as Anuja
- Navneet Nishan as Anju
- Deepshikha Nagpal
- Alok Nath as Somnath

== Soundtrack ==
Soundtrack was composed by Jatin-Lalit and penned by M. G. Hashmat.

Song	Singer
"Maine Pyar Kisise"	Lata Mangeshkar
"Gangster"	Asha Bhosle, Kumar Sanu
"Ek Ladki Mili" - 1	Asha Bhosle, Udit Narayan
"Ek Ladki Mili" - 2	Asha Bhosle, Udit Narayan
"Jaanoon Main"	Poornima, Vinod Rathod
"Ab Hamen Tumse Kitna Pyar Hai"	Alka Yagnik, Vinod Rathod
"Baahon Mein Aake"	Sadhana Sargam, Sapna Mukherjee, Vijayeta Pandit
"Lachak Lachakke Jab Bhi"	Kavita Krishnamurthy, Sadhana Sargam, Vijayeta Pandit
"Naar Naveli Toofani"	Suchitra Krishnamurthy, Bali Brahmbhatt
