= Ishrat Hashmi =

Pakistani actress

- عشرت ہاشمی
- Died: 31 January 2005 (aged 56–57); Karachi, Pakistan
- Education: University of Karachi
- Occupation: Actress
- Years active: 1959 – 2005
- Children: Khursheed Talat (daughter)

Ishrat Hashmi was a Pakistani actress who worked in television, film and radio. She was known for her roles in the TV dramas Dhoop Kinare, Ana, Shehzori and Uncle Urfi.

== Early life ==
Ishrat completed her studies from University of Karachi. She started working at Radio Pakistan in Lahore in 1959.

== Career ==
She made her debut as an actress on PTV in the 1970s. She appeared as the shrewd elderly Haleema in Shama (1976). She also appeared in Afshan, Aroosa and Naukar Ke Aage Chakar. She depicted a cunning matchmaker in Hawain. She also appeared in dramas Family 93, Ba Adab Ba Mulahiza, Khala Khairan, Zeenat, Zair, Zabar, Pesh and Tipu Sultan: The Tiger Lord. She later appeared in dramas Shehzori, Aakhri Chattan, Kya Bane Baat, Burger Family, Ana, Bahadur Ali and Dhoop Kinare. In 1973 she also appeared in the film Naam Kay Nawab. In 2005, tributes were paid to her at the 1st Indus Drama Awards in Karachi by television personalities including Moin Akhter, Adnan Siddiqui, Faysal Qureshi, Sultana Siddiqui, Humayun Saeed and Babra Sharif.

== Personal life ==
Ishrat was married and had six children, including daughters Khursheed Talat, Anjum, Shella and Farah and sons Iqbal and Sohail. In the 2000s, Ishrat left television and moved with her family to America. In 2004, she returned to Pakistan.

== Death ==
Ishrat Hashmi died on 31 January 2005 in Karachi.

== Filmography ==
=== Television ===
Year	Title	Role	Network
1972	Uncle Urfi	Afsheen's aunt	PTV
1974	Zair, Zabar, Pesh	Munni	PTV
1974	Shehzori	Tara's mother	PTV
1976	Shama	Haleema	PTV
1976	Happy Eid Mubarak	Razia	PTV
1981	Afshan	Naseera	PTV
1982	Naukar Ke Aage Chakar	Huma	PTV
1983	Bahadur Ali	Gulo's mother	PTV
1983	Maikay Ka Bakra	Shayan's aunt	PTV
1984	Ana	Arifa	PTV
1986	Altamash	Shah Turkan	PTV
1987	Dhoop Kinare	Anji's mother	PTV
1988	Khala Khairan	Begum	PTV
1989	Tareekh-o-Tamseel	Sabiha	PTV
1990	Ba Adab, Ba Mulahiza	Faryadi	PTV
1990	Aakhri Chattan	Ammi Jaan	PTV
1991	Sassi Punnu	Zainab	PTV
1991	Saaya-e-Deewar	Aini Begum	PTV
1991	Zeenat	Shehar Bano	PTV
1992	Hasina-E-Alam	Mrs. Shehryar	PTV
1992	Green Card	Amma	PTV
1992	Muqanddar Ka Chukandar	Sanjeeda	PTV
1993	Hum Log	Jumbo	PTV
1993	StarNite	Herself	PTV
1994	Tasveer	Aapa	PTV
1994	Aroosa	Naeema	PTV
1995	Asawari	Rahat	PTV
1995	Kya Bane Baat	Tai Jan	PTV
1995	Mandi	Bakhtay	PTV
1995	Hawain	Masi Khyber Mail	PTV
1995	Arzoo	Bobby's mother	STN
1996	Burger Family	Sherish	PTV
1996	Babar	Bua Begum	PTV
1997	Tipu Sultan: The Tiger Lord	Shamsa Begum	PTV
1997	Family 93	Samina's mother	PTV
1997	Hawain	Masi Khyber Mail	PTV
1998	Samandar Hai Darmiyan	Razia Begum	STN
1999	Kangan	Aapa Begum	PTV
2000	Ek Aur Aasman	Khalida	PTV

=== Telefilm ===
Year	Title	Role
1988	Eid Train	Parveen
1998	Dada Giri	Dadu

=== Film ===
Year	Title	Role
1973	Naam Kay Nawab	Rushna
