= Zeenat (TV series) =

Pakistani television series

- زینت
- Genre: Drama
- Written by: Fatima Surayya Bajia
- Directed by: Mohammad Baksh Sumejo
- Starring: Rabia Noreen; Ishrat Hashmi; Zaheen Tahira
- Country of origin: Pakistan
- Original language: Urdu
- No. of seasons: 1
- No. of episodes: 7

Production
- Producer: Mohammad Baksh Sumejo

Original release
- Network: PTV
- Release: 1991 – 1991

Zeenat (Urdu: زینت, lit. 'Beauty') is a 1991 Pakistani television drama series written by Fatima Surayya Bajia, based on Mirza Qaleech Baig's eponymous Sindhi novel, and directed and produced by Mohammad Baksh Sumejo. It was broadcast on PTV.

== Plot ==
The series follows Zeenat, a young Sindhi woman who aspires to continue her education but faces pressure from her mother to marry. She is eventually wed to an older man, against the wishes of her elder brother.

== Cast ==
- Rabia Noreen as Zeenat
- Ishrat Hashmi as Shehar Bano
- Zaheen Tahira as Bibi Jan
- Sultana Zafar as Sara
- Gulab Chandio as Ramzan
- Shafi Muhammad Shah as Allah Dad
- Subhani Ba Yunus as Ali Nawaz
- Ubaida Ansari as Zeenat's mother
- Mehmood Siddiqui as Ali Raza
- Tasneem Rana as Bakhtawar
- Khalid Zaman as Hamid
- Manzoor Murad as Ehsanullah
- Nasreen Naz as Sakeena
- Seema Hasan as Subhai
- Bachal Shah as Major Young
- Farooq Memon as Hoat
- Abdul Aleem Sheikh as Rahgeer
- Israr Alam Siddiqui as Doctor
- Mehmood Ali as Molvi Siddiqui
- Wakeel Farooqi as Wali Muhammad Saen
- Noor Muhammad Lashari as Lakhmeer
- Fareed Nawaz Baloch as Haibat Khan
- Mumtaz Kanwal as Saeeda
- Rehana Akhtar as Kulsoom
- Master Hamza Hamid as Zeenat's son
