= A.R. Khatoon =

Pakistani author

Amtur Rehman Khatoon (better known as A.R. Khatoon, 1900 – February 26, 1965) was a prominent Pakistani author known for her popular fiction novels. She became popular with her debut novel Shama, published in 1941, followed by Afshan, Aaghai and Fakeha.

== Early life ==
A.R. Khatoon was born in Dillī in 1900. She completed her early education at home, and the passion for reading and writing led her to publish essays in "Ismat" magazine, which encouraged her to write novels.

== Style and writing ==
A.R. Khatoon's works were widely read in middle-class homes, especially among housewives.

According to Kishwar Naheed, A.R. Khatoon's works remain widely popular among readers, who tend to favor her writings over literature that addresses real-life issues.

== Adaptions of work ==
Year	Title	Original work	Ref.
1976	Shama	Shama	

== Bibliography ==
- Shama
- Afshan
- Aaghai
- Fakeha
