= Khuda Ki Basti (Karachi) =

Human settlement in Karachi

Coordinates: 25°02′N 67°05′E

Khuda Ki Basti (Urdu: خدا کی بستی) is one of the neighbourhoods of Gadap Town in Karachi, Sindh, Pakistan.

There are several ethnic groups in Khuda Ki Basti including Muhajirs, Punjabis, Sindhis, Kashmiris, Seraikis, Pakhtuns, Balochis, Memons, Bohras, Ismailis, etc. Over 99% of the population is Muslim. The population of Gadap Town is estimated to be nearly one million.

== See also ==
- Khuda Ki Basti
- Khuda Ki Basti (novel)
