= Bandish (1976 TV series) =

1976 Pakistani television series

- بندش
- Genre: Comedy drama; Romance
- Written by: Haseena Moin
- Directed by: Shireen Khan; Mohsin Ali
- Starring: Khalida Riyasat; Talat Hussain; Salim Nasir; Zafar Masood; Zeba Shehnaz
- Country of origin: Pakistan
- Original language: Urdu
- No. of seasons: 1
- No. of episodes: 13

Production
- Producer: Mohsin Ali

Original release
- Network: PTV
- Release: 1976 – 1976

Bandish (Urdu: بندش, lit. 'restraint') is a 1976 Pakistani television series written by Haseena Moin and produced by Mohsin Ali for Pakistan Television Corporation (PTV).

The series stars Khalida Riyasat and Talat Hussain in the central roles, with a supporting cast that includes Salim Nasir, Zafar Masood and Zeba Shehnaz. Bandish is regarded as one of Moin's classic works of the period and was an early career-defining role for Riyasat.

== Plot ==
The series follows Tania, a young woman who leaves her grandfather's house to avoid an arranged marriage. She seeks the help of Shahzad, a lawyer, and takes refuge in the household of his guardian — a setting in which she becomes entangled in the family's marital and financial intrigues.

== Cast ==
- Khalida Riyasat as Tania
- Talat Hussain as Shahzad
- Salim Nasir as Aamir
- Zeba Shehnaz as Ms D'Souza
- Zafar Masood as Khalid
- Sahab Qazalbash as Samina
- Mohammad Yousuf as Baba Jan
- Mahmood Masood as Shoaib

== Broadcast and reception ==
Bandish was originally broadcast on PTV in 1976 over 13 episodes. It was rebroadcast in February 1998 and subsequently on PTV Home under the PTV Gold Hour segment. The series remains widely cited in retrospectives of Haseena Moin's work as one of the formative dramas of PTV's classical period.
