= Kiran Kahani =

Pakistani television drama series

- Title screen
- کرن کہانی
- Genre: Comedy; Drama
- Written by: Haseena Moin
- Directed by: Shireen Khan; Mohsin Ali
- Starring: Roohi Bano; Manzoor Qureshi
- Country of origin: Pakistan
- Original language: Urdu
- No. of seasons: 1
- No. of episodes: 10

Production
- Producer: Zaheer Khan

Original release
- Network: PTV
- Release: 1973 – 1973

Kiran Kahani (Urdu: کرن کہانی, lit. 'Kiran's Story') is a 1973 Pakistani television drama series written by Haseena Moin, directed by Shireen Khan, and produced by Zaheer Khan for the Pakistan Television Corporation. It was the first television drama serial in Pakistan to be written from an original script, at a time when PTV had previously relied on novel-based adaptations. The series starred Roohi Bano in the lead role, a performance that brought her widespread recognition.

== Plot ==
The drama centres on Kiran, a young woman, and follows her daily life and relationships within her family.

== Cast ==
- Roohi Bano as Kiran Asim
- Manzoor Qureshi as Salman
- Begum Khurshid Mirza as Safia
- Babra Sharif as Seema
- Arsh Muneer as Chand's mother
- Jamshed Ansari as Safdar
- Zeenat Yasmeen as Mumi
- Qazi Wajid as Abid
- Mahmood Ali as Daddy
- Zafar Siddiqui as Baba
- Zafar Masood as Irfan

== Production ==
At the time of its production, PTV had relied exclusively on dramatisations of existing novels and literary works. Haseena Moin was encouraged to write an original script by director Mohsin Ali, and the resulting serial, Kiran Kahani, became the first original screenplay in Pakistani television history. The script editor Iftikhar Arif supported the project following his review of the manuscript.

== Remake ==
The drama was remade under the same title in 2006, again written by Haseena Moin, and starred Nadia Jamil and Rehan Sheikh in the lead roles. The remake was directed by Zarak and broadcast on PTV World.
