= Komal Rizvi =

Komal Rizvi کومل رضوی
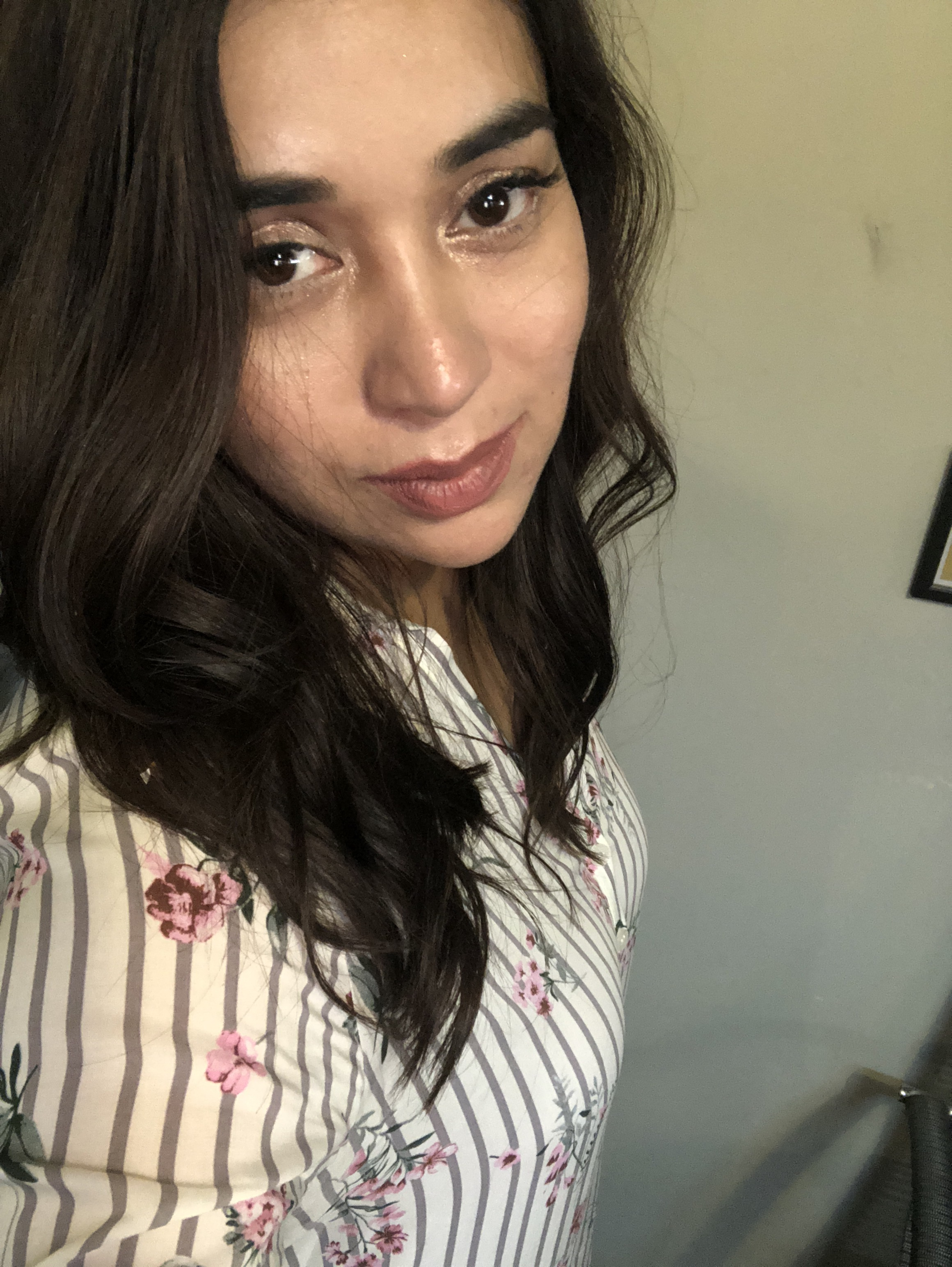
- Komal Rizvi

Background information
- Born: Komal Rizvi; 3 August 1976 (age 50); Dubai, UAE
- Genres: Pop, bhangra and contemporary
- Occupations: Singer, Songwriter, Actress; Host of Pakistan Television shows
- Years active: (1995 – present)
- Spouse(s): Majid Bashir (m. 2013- div. 2019)

Komal Rizvi (Urdu: کومل رضوی; born 3 August 1976) is a Pakistani actress, singer-songwriter, and television host. She is famous for her songs at Coke Studio (Pakistan).

== Early life ==
Rizvi was born in Dubai and raised in Finland and Nigeria. As a teenager, she came to Pakistan and launched her career in Karachi, where she was also a student.

She started her career at age 16 when her talent was spotted by a family friend of her brother Hasan Rizvi, who is a dancer and entrepreneur and also performed with Komal at various fashion events.

She released her first song in 1999 which went on to become the super hit Punjabi bhangra song "Bauji bauji bhangra saaday naal paoji". She became an overnight sensation.

She often writes the lyrics for her own songs.

Komal recently launched her own safe skincare brand, Truly Komal, which is Pakistan’s first line of safe skincare products. Komal Rizvi, in collaboration with a leading chemist from Canada, developed proprietary skincare formulations, all of which are manufactured in Spain. With over 30 products available both in-store and online, Truly Komal is contributing to the evolution of Pakistan’s beauty industry.

== Personal life ==
In April 2021, Komal Rizvi opened up about her abusive marriage and divorce. She said that she moved to Oman in 2013 after her marriage and was treated badly by her husband. She further stated that her husband was mentally ill and was violent towards her. She finally got divorced in 2019.

== Career ==
=== Acting ===
Rizvi's first screen role was for Pakistan Television (PTV), the super hit Hawain in 1995, followed by Lehrein. TV serials like Kabhi Kabhi, Teesra Pehar and Samandar Hai Darmiyan helped establish her as one of the leading actresses in the Pakistani television industry. She appeared in Hum TV's Mujhay Roothnay Na Daina.

Despite the critical acclaim she has received for her acting, Rizvi is very selective about her acting projects as she tries to maintain her main focus on singing. "There are a few things that I look at before accepting a role. The major thing is the script and the production team. I accept only if the script is strong, realistic and relatable. I don't accept to act if the part I am going to play and the script are not good enough," Rizvi said in an interview given to You! Magazine.

In September 2016, it was reported that Rizvi would star in a Hollywood movie under the banner of a Canadian production house. This new film, named Afreen, was scheduled to be released in 2017. Rizvi said in a newspaper interview, about the film's subject and plot, "It's an anti-ISIS and a pro-Muslim film".

=== Television show hosting ===
Rizvi started her TV hosting career with Karachi Nights With Komal. The highlight of her hosting career remains the TV show she did for Hum in Pakistan where she hosted Hum TV Mornings With Komal and Nachley, and the popular dance reality show for ARY.

=== Singing ===
Rizvi was a part of Coke Studio's third season where she performed Daaneh Pe Daanah with folk singer Akhtar Chanal Zahri. Originally written and composed by Zahri himself, the song sings the praises of the province Balochistan he hails from. This Coke Studio rendition of the folk song, fused with Sindhi Sufi classic Lal Meri Path, took both well-loved anthems to a new level in 2011.

Reimagined against a modern funk-inspired backdrop, the song became a musical expression of diversity, highlighting the contrasting personalities and styles of Zahri and Rizvi.[1]

Rizvi also performed "Lambi Judaai", a classic Reshma number. Reshma caused a stir across the border when "Lambi Judaai" from the soundtrack of 1983 Bollywood film Hero became a massive hit. Coke Studio presented the nostalgic melody against a fluid backdrop of rich chordal elements to take on the quality of a ballad from the 1950s. Both numbers were featured on the Top 10 all-time hits of Coke Studio. Rizvi is the only female singer to be featured twice on that list.

She has performed many old Punjabi songs.

== Filmography ==
=== Drama serials ===
Year	Title	Role	Network
1996	Lehrain	Saima	PTV
1997	Hawain	Asma	PTV
1998	Samandar Hai Darmiyan	Pooja	PTV
1999	Kabhi Kabhi		PTV
2001	Teesra Pehar	Mani	PTV World
2011	Mujhay Roothnay Na Daina	Rabia	Hum TV
2021	Tanaa Banaa	Zebunnisa	Hum TV
2021	Yun Tu Hai Pyar Bohut	Noor	Hum TV

== Discography ==
Year	Album(s)	Languages	Notes
1998	Komal	Hindi; Punjabi; Urdu	Debut album
1999	Manaskanya	Assamese	As a Backing vocal only
2001	Parbat	Hindi; Urdu	
