= Tipu Sultan (TV series) =

Pakistani television series

- ٹیپو سلطان
- Genre: Historical; Drama
- Written by: Khan Asif
- Directed by: Qasim Jalali
- Starring: Tahir Kazmi; Gulab Chandio; Javeria Saud; Ghazala Kaifee; Tahira Wasti; Mishi Khan
- Country of origin: Pakistan
- Original language: Urdu
- No. of seasons: 1
- No. of episodes: 20

Production
- Producer: M. Hussain Khanzada

Original release
- Network: PTV
- Release: February 2000 – July 2000

Tipu Sultan (Urdu: ٹیپو سلطان, lit. 'Tipu Sultan: The Tiger Lord') is a 2000 Pakistani historical drama television series written by Khan Asif, directed by Qasim Jalali, and produced by M. Hussain Khanzada. It aired on PTV and consists of 20 episodes.

== Synopsis ==
The series dramatises the life of Tipu Sultan, the eldest son of Sultan Hyder Ali and Fakhr-un-Nissa. According to the drama's narrative, Hyder Ali names his son after the Sufi saint Tipu Mastan Aulia. The series follows Tipu Sultan's rise to become the ruler of the Kingdom of Mysore.

== Cast ==
- Tahir Kazmi as Tipu Sultan
- Gulab Chandio as Purniya, Dewan of Mysore
- Javeria Saud as Sareeta
- Sikandar Shaheen as Hyder Ali (Tipu's father)
- Ghazala Kaifee as Malka Fatima Fakhr-un-Nisa (Tipu's mother)
- K.U. Khan as General Harris
- Fareeda Shabbir as Maharani Devi
- Tahira Wasti as Rani Lakshra
- Mishi Khan as Rukayya Bano (Tipu's wife)
- Subhani Ba Yunus as Nazim
- Ayesha Khan as Malka Begum Nizam (wife of the Nizam)
- Fazila Kaiser as Tajdar Begum (Tipu's wife)
- Nasir Jamal Khattak as Syed Ghaffar
- Ishrat Hashmi as Sareeta's mother
- Shamim-ul-Hassan as Mir Qasim

== Reception ==
The Director marketing of PTV told to the Dawn Images that the shows like Tipu Sultan has generated an income far beyond the network's target, exceeding 1.5 billion rupees.
