= Insan Aur Gadha =

1973 film

- انسان اور گدھا
- Directed by: Syed Kamal
- Written by: Syed Kemal (Idea: Tanvir Kazmi)
- Based on: Gadhay Ki Sarguzasht (novel by Krishan Chandar)
- Produced by: Syed Kamal
- Starring: Rangeela; Nisho; Kamal; Rozina
- Cinematography: Azhar Zaidi
- Music by: Nashad
- Release date: 31 August 1973
- Country: Pakistan
- Language: Urdu

Insan Aur Gadha (Man and Donkey) is a 1973 Pakistani Urdu satirical comedy film produced and directed by Kamal.

The comedy actor Rangeela played the title role of a donkey-turned-human. The other lead cast included Nisho, Kamal, and Rozina. The central idea of the film was taken from Krishan Chandar's novel "Gadhay Ki Sarguzasht".

After a few weeks of its release, Insan Aur Gadha was banned by the Bhutto Government due to a parody speech scene that the government did not like. "Publicly, the reason given for the ban was that the scene had ridiculed the (Pakistani) masses, by depicting them as a bunch of donkeys".

== Plot ==
A donkey desires to be a human, so he prays to God to fulfill his wish. But when his prayer is actually answered and he transforms into a man, he quickly finds out that his life purpose and moral duties were more meaningful and easily identifiable when he was a donkey than when he is a human being. He eventually asks God to change him back into a donkey since he is so disappointed in humanity (or its lack thereof).

== Cast ==
- Rangeela — as the human version of a donkey
- Kamal — as the master
- Nisho
- Rozina
- Nirala
- Aslam Pervaiz
- Hanif
- Mehmood Ali
- Reshma
- Shakeel
- Sikandar
- Guests appearances: Ghazala Kaifee, Iqbal Hassan, Kemal Irani, Afzaal Ahmad, Sultan Rahi, Ilyas Kashmiri

== Release and ban ==
Insan Aur Gadha was released on 31 August 1973. Soon after its release at theaters, the Pakistan People Party's government banned the film due to a satirical speech by the donkey-turned-human character, delivered before a large gathering of donkeys. The political government of the time took the satire as an offense. According to a film critic Mushtaq Gazdar, the scene did not conceal the fact that it was parodying Prime Minister Zulfiqar Ali Bhutto's distinctive brand of populist oratory.

Though, a month later, the film was allowed to be screened again.

== Awards ==
Year	Film	Award	Category	Awardee	Ref.
1973	Insan Aur Gadha	Nigar Award	Best Comedian	Rangeela	
