= Jangloos =

1987 novel by Shaukat Siddiqui

- Author: Shaukat Siddiqui
- Language: Urdu
- Subject: Socio-political and fiction
- Genre: Political fiction
- Set in: Central Punjab, Pakistan
- Published: 1987
- Publisher: Raktab Publications, Karachi
- Publication place: Pakistan
- Media type: Hardcover
- ISBN: 978-969-754-606-0

Title card of the Jangloos TV series.

Jangloos is an Urdu novel written by Pakistani author Shaukat Siddiqui, and first published in 1987. Set against the backdrop of Central Punjab, the novel tells the story of two prisoners who escape from jail. Jangloos is the second novel of Siddiqui after his debut, Khuda Ki Basti. Primarily in Urdu, the novel also has Punjabi as its secondary language.

It was adapted into a television series which aired on PTV in 1989.

== Plot summary ==
The story is set against the backdrop of central Punjab, Pakistan, where two prisoners, Raheem Dad and Lali, escape from Central Jail Sahiwal. In an attempt to hide from the authorities, they face various hurdles and come across several criminals.

== Adaptation ==
The novel was adapted as a television series of the same name by PTV, which was broadcast in 1989 and directed by Kazim Pasha. The series was left unfinished, and only the first volume of the novel was adapted. The protagonist characters were played by M. Warsi (as Laali) and Shabbir Jan (as Raheem Dad).
