= Roohi Bano =

Pakistani actress (1951–2019)

- روحی بانو
- Born: Roohi Bano; 10 August 1951; Karachi, Pakistan
- Died: 25 January 2019 (aged 67); Istanbul, Turkey
- Other name: The Queen of Melancholy
- Education: Government College University, Lahore
- Occupations: TV actress; Model
- Years active: 1968 – 2010
- Children: 1
- Parent(s): Alla Rakha (father); Zeenat Begum (mother)
- Relatives: Rubina Yasmeen (sister); Taufiq Qureshi (half-brother); Zakir Hussain (half-brother); Fazal Qureshi (half-brother); Isabella Qureshi (niece); Anisa Qureshi (niece); Razia Khan (half-sister); Bilquis Hussain (step-sister); Khurshid Aulia (half-sister); Shikaar Naad Qureshi (nephew); Faryal Mehmood (grand niece)
- Awards: Pride of Performance (1981)

Roohi Bano (Urdu: روحی بانو) (10 August 1951 – 25 January 2019) was a Pakistani actress who was known for her roles in television dramas Kiran Kahani, Zard Gulab, Darwaza and Dehleez. She along with Uzma Gillani, Tahira Naqvi and Khalida Riyasat dominated Pakistan's television screens from the 1970s, to the 1990s. She was known as the Queen of Melancholy because of her portrayal of mournful and pessimistic roles in dramas and films.

== Early life ==
Roohi Bano was born in Karachi on 10 August 1951. She was the daughter of Alla Rakha, a noted tabla player of India and half-sister of Indian music virtuoso Ustad Zakir Hussain.

== Career ==
Roohi joined television when she was doing her Masters in Psychology from the Government College, Lahore.

She is reported to have "witnessed the birth of the television industry in Pakistan...". Bano's first major breakthrough came in 1973 with her performance as the cheerful Kiran in PTV's Kiran Kahani. Her next performance was of an elite class girl in Zair Zabar Paish. She then portrayed Simi in the television adaptation of Altaf Fatima's Dastak Na Do, which broadcast from PTV's Lahore center. Throughout the 1970s and 1980s, she appeared in nearly 150 TV dramas, including celebrated works like Zard Gulab, and Darwaza. In 1981, she was conferred the Pride of Performance award by the President of Pakistan. She also earned many PTV awards, notably Nigar Award, Graduate Award and Lux Lifetime Achievement Award.

== Personal life ==
Roohi married twice but both of her marriages were unsuccessful. She had one son.

== Later life and death ==
In 2005, her 20-year-old only son was murdered by unidentified killers near his residence in Gulberg III, Lahore. His body was dumped alongside a fence where a passerby spotted it. After her son's murder, Roohi had abandoned her acting career, led a lonely life in Lahore and she never fully recovered from this tragic event in her life. In her later life, she was diagnosed with schizophrenia. She also spent some years at the well known rehabilitation centre Fountain House in Lahore. Her sister had her admitted to the rehabilitation centre in 2005.

Roohi died in Istanbul on 25 January 2019. She had had kidney disease and a mental disorder. She had been on a ventilator for 10 days before she died. According to her sister, Rubina Yasmeen, her family had travelled to Istanbul, Turkey to be with her in her last days.

== Filmography ==
=== Television series ===
Year	Title	Role	Network
1971	Dastak Na Do	Simi	PTV
1973	Kiran Kahani	Kiran Asim	PTV
1974	Zair Zabar Paish	Sabeen	PTV
1975	Dastan-e-Habib	Mumtaz	PTV
1975	Ishtebah-e-Nazar	Feroza	PTV
1975	Maraat-e-Muhabbat	Shahida	PTV
1979	Pakki Haveli	Reshma	PTV
1979	Kacha Sheesha	Saima	PTV
1980	Karwan	Mina	PTV
1981	Darwaza	Zareena Chaudhry	PTV
1981	Kaanch Ka Pul	Shahida	PTV
1981	Dehleez	Saeeda Naseem	PTV
1982	Zard Gulab	Jeevni	PTV
1982	Dhund	Bella	PTV
1982	Sarab	Nashi	PTV
1983	Adhay Chehray	Bushra	PTV
1983	Silver Jubilee	Herself	PTV
1984	Gardish	Saba	PTV
1985	Bazgasht	Nasreen	PTV
1985	Apnay Loag	Irene	PTV
1987	Gardish	Begum Sahiba	PTV
1989	Neelay Hath	Zainab	PTV
1990	Kache Pakke Rang	Sakeena	PTV
1991	Kala Diara	Angie	PTV
1992	Nasheman	Parveen	PTV
1994	Sood-o-Zea	Muneeza	PTV
1996	Qila Kahani	Rubina	PTV
2010	Aik Aur Aurat	Azra	Hum TV

=== Telefilm ===
Year	Title	Role	Network
1990	Aakhri Geet	Reshma	PTV

=== Film ===
Year	Film	Language
1975	Umang	Urdu
1975	Palki	Urdu
1976	Insan Aur Farishta	Urdu
1976	Goonj Uthi Shehnai	Urdu
1976	Rastay Ka Pathar	Urdu
1977	Tipu Sultan	Urdu
1978	Khuda Aur Mohabbat	Urdu
1978	Dushman Ki Talash	Urdu
1980	Zameer	Urdu
1980	Samjhota	Urdu
1980	Aazmaish	Urdu
1981	Dil Ek Khilona	Urdu
1981	Kiran Aur Kali	Urdu
1981	Bara Aadmi	Urdu
1983	Kainat	Urdu
1984	Aaj Ka Insan	Urdu

== Tribute and honours ==
In 2019 on 3 February Pakistan National Council of the Arts paid tributes to her and described her a dignified, refined and polished artist. In 2021 on August 16 the Government of Pakistan named a street and intersection after her in Lahore.

== Awards and recognition ==
Year	Award	Category	Result	Title	Ref.
1974	PTV Award	Best Actress	Won	Zair Zabar Paish	
1976	Nigar Award	Special Award	Won	Insan Aur Farishta	
1978	Film Graduate Awards	Best Actress	Won	Khuda Aur Mohabbat	
1981	Pride of Performance	Award by the President of Pakistan	Won	Herself	
1981	Film Graduate Awards	Best Actress	Won	Kiran Aur Kali	
1982	PTV Award	Best Actress	Nominated	Karwan	
1983	Film Graduate Awards	Best Actress	Won	Kainat	
1983	PTV Award	Best Actress	Won	Zard Gulab	
2010	9th Lux Style Awards	Unilever Chairman's Lifetime Achievement Award	Won	Herself	
2011	1st Hum Awards	Lifetime Achievement Award	Won	Herself	
