= Shakeel =

Pakistani actor (1943–2023)

- شکیل
- Born: Yousuf Kamal; 29 May 1943; Bhopal, Central Provinces, British India (now in Madhya Pradesh, India)
- Died: 29 June 2023 (aged 80); Karachi, Sindh, Pakistan
- Years active: 1966–2018
- Known for: Uncle Urfi (1972); Ankahi (1982); Aangan Terha (1984)

Pride of Performance Award Recipient
- Date: 1992
- Country: Islamic Republic of Pakistan
- Presented by: Government of Pakistan

Yousuf Kamal (Urdu: یوسف کمال; 29 May 1943 – 29 June 2023), known professionally as Shakeel Yousuf (Urdu: شکیل یوسف), was a Pakistani actor best known for his roles in the PTV drama series Uncle Urfi (1972), as Taimoor Ahmad in Ankahi (1982) and as Mehboob Ahmed in PTV's Aangan Terha (1984).

Due to his blue eyes and looks he was compared to Hollywood actor Tony Curtis.

== Early life ==
Shakeel was born Yusuf Kamal in Bhopal, British India in 1943. His family later migrated to Karachi, Pakistan.

His father was from Lucknow, where Shakeel spent his initial years. He received his primary education from an English-medium school in Lucknow and in a French missionary school in India, the La Martiniere. Following the 1947 partition, his family moved to Karachi, Pakistan in 1952, settling down in Nazimabad, where Shakeel continued his education.

== Career ==
=== Radio and cinema ===
Shakeel began his career in Karachi, where he was introduced to broadcasting through a school programme on Radio Pakistan and later to theatre by a college teacher. He initially appeared in films during the 1960s under the name Yousuf Kamal, later adopting the screen name Shakeel, though he achieved limited success in cinema; his first movie was Honehar (1966) as the second male lead, co-starring Waheed Murad. His career gained momentum with the expansion of television broadcasting from Karachi following the establishment of Pakistan Television Corporation (PTV) in 1968.

=== Television ===
==== 1970s-1980s:leading roles ====
He rose to prominence in the early 1970s with the Eid television play Happy Eid Mubarak (1970), written by Haseena Moin, marking both his breakthrough role and the beginning of a long association with the writer. His pairing with Neelofer Aleem was widely appreciated and led to the popular PTV serial Shehzori (1972). During this period, Shakeel established himself as a leading romantic actor in television dramas, including Zair Zabar Paish (1974) and Parchhaiyaan (1976), the latter being the first colour serial aired on PTV.

In the late 1970s and 1980s, Shakeel expanded into leading roles, continuing to appear in major productions. His notable performances include Uncle Urfi (1975), Ankahi (1982), where he played Taimur, and Aangan Terha (1984), written by Anwar Maqsood. He also worked extensively in dramas by Fatima Surayya Bajia, including Uroosa (1994), Shaheen (1986), and the science-fiction series Tick Tick Company (1979).

==== 1990s and later career: character roles ====
In the 1990s, Shakeel took on more complex roles, most notably portraying a bureaucrat in Chand Girhan (1992), written by Asghar Nadeem Syed. He also appeared in theatre productions and remained selective in his television work. In cinema, he portrayed Nawabzada Liaquat Ali Khan in the biographical film Jinnah (1998), directed by Jamil Dehlavi.

In December 2012, Shakeel performed a 35-minute one-man stage show in Karachi, in which he addressed themes of war, poverty, and social decline. During the performance, he expressed the view that prolonged conflict leads to hunger and economic hardship, and reflected on an earlier period characterized by greater social cohesion, honesty, and mutual concern. Numerous celebrities including Fatima Surayya Bajia, Hasina Moin, Bushra Ansari and Anwar Maqsood were in the audience to watch his performance.

In his later career, Shakeel transitioned primarily to supporting and paternal roles, appearing alongside younger television actors in serials through the mid-2010s. Over a career spanning nearly six decades, he worked across radio, theatre, film, and television, becoming a prominent figure of Pakistan's classic television era.

== Death ==
Shakeel died on 29 June 2023, at the age of 80. He had been battling a prolonged illness, and news of his death had an emotional impact on admirers and fellow artists alike.

== Selected filmography ==
=== Films ===
Year	Title	Role	Notes
1966	Honehar		Acting debut
1968	Josh-e-intiqaam		
1968	Papi		
1968	Zindagi		
1969	Daastan		
1973	Insan Aur Gadha		
1981	Jeedar		
1998	Jinnah	Nawabzada Liaquat Ali Khan	

=== Television series ===
Year	Title	Role	Network	Notes
1971	Naya Raasta		PTV	Television debut
1972	Uncle Urfi	Irfanuddin Ahmed (Uncle Urfi)	PTV	
1973	Shehzori	Mustafa	PTV	
1974	Zair Zabar Paish	Khadim	PTV	
1976	Parchaiyan	Masood	PTV	
1977	Intezar Framaiay	Kamal	PTV	
1979	Tick Tick Company		PTV	Sci-fi series
1981	Afshan	Ali Raza	PTV	
1982	Ankahi	Taimur Ahmed	PTV	
1984	Aangan Terha	Mehboob Ahmed	PTV	
1988	Flight 033	Captain	PTV	Long-play
1990-91	Waqt Ka Aasman		PTV	
1994	Aroosa	Tofique	PTV	
1995	Uraan	Captain Jamshed	PTV	Based on the PIA
1995	Chand Grehan	Babar Sahab	STN	
1999	Tum Se Mil Kar	Ehsaan	PTV	
2000	Aansoo	Doctor	PTV	Cameo appearance
2001	The Castle: Aik Umeed	Yousuf	PTV	
2006	Gharoor	Seth Abdullah	PTV	
2009	Ishq Ki Inteha	Rauf	Geo Entertainment	
2009	Meri Zaat Zarra-e-Benishan		Geo Entertainment	Cameo appearance
2010	Hawa Rait Aur Aangan		PTV	
2013	Kankar	Kamal	Hum TV	
2013	Mujhe Khuda Pe Yaqeen Hai	Shakeel	Hum TV	
2016	Sila	Aleem	Hum TV	
2017	Imam Zamin	Ahmed Ali	TV One	
2018	Belapur Ki Dayan	Aziz Ahmed	Hum TV	

== Awards and recognition ==
- In recognition of his contributions to show business, he was awarded the Pride of Performance in 1992.
- Nominee: Best Actor Drama Series in a Supporting Role in The 1st Indus Drama Awards in 2005

== See also ==
- List of Lollywood actors
