= Shama (TV series) =

Pakistani television series

- Title screen
- شمع
- Genre: Family; Tragedy; Drama
- Written by: Fatima Surayya Bajia
- Directed by: Qasim Jalali
- Starring: Ghazala Kaifee; Jawed Sheikh; Begum Khurshid Mirza; Rizwan Wasti; Anwar Iqbal
- Country of origin: Pakistan
- Original language: Urdu
- No. of seasons: 1
- No. of episodes: 21

Original release
- Network: PTV
- Release: 1976 – 1976

Shama (Urdu: شمع, lit. 'Candle') is a 1976 Pakistani television series written by Fatima Surayya Bajia, based on the eponymous novel by A.R. Khatoon, and directed by Qasim Jalali. It first aired in 1976 on PTV and is now considered a cult classic.

== Plot ==
A girl named Shama lives with her maternal family after the death of her mother and has a close relationship with her grandmother.

== Cast ==
- Syed Majid Ali as Mian Jee (Qamar's Grandfather)
- Ghazala Kaifee as Shama
- Jawed Sheikh as Mansoor
  - Saleem Sheikh plays Mansoor as a child)
- Anwar Iqbal as Qamar
- Akbar Subhani as Tahir
- Rizwan Wasti as Akhtar Hassan
- Nafees Hassan as Kishwar Jahan (Mansoor's aunt)
- Begum Khurshid Mirza as Gaiti Ara Begum (Shama's grandmother)
- Ishrat Hashmi as Halima (Qamar's mother)
- Zaheen Tahira as Khursheed (Mansoor's mother)
- Arsh Muneer as Bua
- Nawab Kaifee as Amjad
- Tasneem Rana as Shabbo
- Hadi ul Islam as Khan Bahadur Sahab
- Mohammad Yousuf as Nasir Abbas
