= Mahmood Ali =

Pakistani artist

- Born: 1928; Hyderabad, Hyderabad State, British India
- Died: 11 July 2008 (aged 79–80); Karachi, Pakistan
- Occupations: Radio Pakistan and Pakistani television artist
- Years active: 1945 – 1995
- Awards: Pride of Performance Award by the President of Pakistan in 1985

Syed Mahmood Ali (1928 – 11 July 2008; Urdu:سید محمود علی) was a Pakistani radio, film, television and stage artist.

== Early life and career ==
Mahmood Ali was born in Hyderabad Deccan in British India in 1928. He began his career with All India Radio in 1945. He migrated to Pakistan after independence, arriving in Lahore in 1947. He soon moved to Karachi and joined Radio Pakistan during its early days, in 1947. Mahmood Ali contributed to Radio Pakistan and Pakistan Television for more than 50 years.

== Radio ==
His notable contributions are:

- Syed Mahmood Ali started his acting career from a radio play, Khawaja Moinuddin's Theater.
- Haamid Mian Kay Haan (a Radio Pakistan play in the 1950s)
- Mirza Ghalib Bunder Road Pe (a Radio Pakistan play in the 1960s)
- Lal Qila Sey Lalu Khait Tak (a Radio Pakistan play in the 1960s)

== TV ==
- In 1965, Ali joined Pakistan television as an employee.
- His role as 'Maulvi Sahib' in Pakistan Television Corporation's production, PTV TV drama series Taleem-e-Balighan (1966), became very popular.
- Khuda Ki Basti (serial) ( first production in 1969, second production in 1974 by PTV)
- Kiran Kahani (1973)
- Zair, Zabar, Pesh (1974)
- Hawain (1997)

== Films ==
Mahmood Ali also worked in over 25 films:

- Chori Chhuppe (1965)
- Insan Aur Gadha (1973)
- Khush Naseeb (1980s)

== Death and legacy ==
Syed Mahmood Ali died on 11 July 2008 due to cardiac arrest at age 80. He was buried at Wadi-e-Hussain graveyard in Karachi, Pakistan.

== Awards and recognition ==
- Pride of Performance Award by the President of Pakistan in 1985

== See also ==
- List of Lollywood actors
