= Subhani Ba Yunus =

Pakistani television actor

- سبحانی بایونس
- Born: 1931; Hyderabad Deccan, British India
- Died: 30 May 2006 (aged 74–75)
- Occupation: Radio artist / TV actor
- Years active: 1950s–2006

Subhani Ba Yunus (Urdu: سبحانی بایونس; 1931–2006), also spelled Subhani Bayunus, was an accomplished Pakistani actor and television and radio personality whose distinct voice quality earned him a special place in Radio Pakistan. Younis was an Urdu-speaking Hyderabadi Muslim of Hadhrami Chaush descent. His claim to fame comes from Khwaja Moinuddin's stage plays, particularly Taleem-e-Balighan in which he played the role of a butcher.

His memorable plays were Lal Qilay Se Lalo Khait Tak, Mohammad Bin Qasim, Karawaan, Qisa Chahar Darwaish, Jungle, Mirza Ghalib Bandar Road Par, Do Duni Panch, Khuda Ki Basti and Tanhaiyaan. His last play for PTV was Ba Adab Ba Mulahiza, after which he virtually retired from acting PTV drama series JAANE DO also starring Behrouz Sabzwani

== Personal life ==
Subhani Ba Yunus was born in Hyderabad Deccan, British India, in 1931. He belonged to a family that had migrated to India from Hadhramaut, Yemen. After the partition of India, his family settled in Karachi in August 1949. He had a son and a daughter.

== Career ==
Initially, Subhani Bayunus performed mostly in Khawaja Moinuddin's plays, and it was to him that he owed his move to PTV. It so happened that after the tremendous success of Khawaja sahib's Lal Qilay Sey Lalukhet Tuk and Taleem-i-Balghaan, the writer was invited to adapt the plays for television. Subhani Bayunus, who had performed important roles in these plays on radio, took on the acting assignments on PTV with equal facility and subsequent success. He managed to carve out a niche for himself on PTV with brilliant performances in plays like Lal Qilay Sey Lalukhet Tuk, Taleem-i-Balghaan, Shama,(he did not took part in Shama it was rather Afshan where he played role of Zartaj's father[the 2nd wife of Mr Mohsin Mumtaz and Afshan's Step mom]) Tanhaiyaan, Tipu Sultan: The Tiger Lord, Khuda Ki Basti, Mera Naam Mangu, Zeenat, Intizar Farmaiye, Janey Do, Insan Aur Aadmi, Ba Adab Ba Mulahiza Hoshiar, Akahri Chataan and Labbaik.

He had a knack of playing mystery roles and did a superb job with the lead role of detective Inspector Zuberi in Ali Zafar Jafri's mystery series which was aired on TV and radio. He played character roles in many episodes of NTM's Mystery Theatre which was re-telecast on a private TV channel a couple of years ago. It is said he worked for Ibn-e-Safi as well.

Subhani Bayunus tried his hand in films and performed the role of a villain in Iqbal Akhtar's Nadaan (1973). He played character roles in Athar Shah Khan Jaidi's Aas Paas (1982) and Iqbal Akhtar's comeback failure Muskurahat (1995). He acted in a Gujarati film titled Mann Tey Maan and Javed Jabbar's English-language film Beyond the Last Mountain (1977).

It is said that the Mirza Ghalib role that made Subhani Bayunus a household name in the 1960s was originally given to Mohammad Yousuf. But the renowned man of letters Nazar Hyderabadi insisted that the role be given to Subhani Bayunus whose height and appearance made him bear a striking resemblance to Ghalib. Subhani Bayunus also played Ghalib in a documentary made by the Directorate of Films and Publications in 1968 as part of Ghalib's centenary celebrations. This documentary was not shown due to political reasons. It is available from Shalimar Recording Company, Islamabad.

== Awards ==
For his outstanding contributions to acting, he received the Pride of Performance award from the Government of Pakistan in 1999.

== Death ==
He died at the age of 78, after a long illness on Wednesday 30 May 2006 in Karachi at his residence in PIB Colony. He was laid to rest in Yaseenabad graveyard, where relatives and friends bade him farewell.
