= Khuda Ki Basti (novel) =

Pakistani Urdu novel penned by Shaukat Siddiqui

- Author: Shaukat Siddiqui
- Language: Urdu
- Genre: Novel
- Publication date: 1957
- Publication place: Pakistan
- Media type: Print (paperback)

Khuda Ki Basti (transl. God's Own Land) is a Pakistani Urdu novel penned by Shaukat Siddiqui in 1957. The novel is about life in a Karachi slum built after the independence of Pakistan in 1947 and the struggles in the lives of poor people living there. The TV drama serials Khuda Ki Basti made in 1969 and 1974 were based on the novel.

== Description ==
A modern classic of Urdu literature by Shaukat Siddiqui, the setting for Khuda Ki Basti are the 1950s slums of Karachi and Lahore in a newly independent Pakistan. The story revolves around a poor, respectable family that has fallen on hard times. Corruption and degradation take over their lives. Jobless, and without any real hope of a better life, they find themselves in the clutches of unprincipled evil people who exploit them. It's the story of a young woman, Sultana, and her younger brother, Annu. Their widowed mother is first pursued by a conniving man from the neighbourhood who apparently wants to marry her, but whose real intention is to get access to her pretty young daughter, Sultana, for his sexual pleasure. After this man marries the mother, he arranges a medically facilitated murder of her. Then the vulnerable children are exploited in every way by the neighbourhood's shady characters. The tragic, deeply moving finale is inevitable.

== Adaptations ==
Khuda Ki Basti was adapted as a serial produced by Pakistan Television in 1969 and 1974. In 1974, Prime Minister Zulfikar Ali Bhutto asked for the re-telecast of Khuda Ki Basti, as it was Bhutto's favourite TV serial for its appealing social message. But Pakistan Television had problems with it, as the videotape recordings of Khuda Ki Basti on spool videotape in 1969 had long been erased due to video tape scarcity back then and re-recording of other programs on the same videotape. Zulfikar Ali Bhutto insisted that the serial must be re-telecast even if fresh recording is essential.

The 1974 version of re-recorded Khuda Ki Basti was 50-minute episodes that lasted 13 weeks and created the same social impact that the 1969 version did. TV directors Bakhtiyar Ahmed and Qasim Jalali did a fine job. After the 1974 version was filmed, the entire TV serial has been well maintained by Pakistan Television, with a repeat telecast in 1990. The original novel was also dramatized by Rashid Sami (Kohinoor Studio). This was released on Geo TV.

== See also ==
- Khuda Ki Basti, a neighborhood of Karachi
