= Fatima Surayya Bajia =

Pakistani writer

- Born: 1 September 1930; Raichur, Hyderabad State, British India
- Died: 10 February 2016 (aged 85); Karachi, Sindh, Pakistan
- Resting place: Gizri cemetery
- Occupation: Writer
- Years active: 1960–2016
- Awards: Hilal-i-Imtiaz (2013); Pride of Performance (1996)

Fatima Surayya Bajia (Urdu: فاطمہ ثریّا بجیا; 1 September 1930 – 10 February 2016) was an Urdu novelist, playwright and drama writer from Pakistan. She was awarded various awards at home and abroad, including Japan's highest civil award, in recognition of her works. Bajia remained Advisor to the Chief Minister of Sindh province in Pakistan, and was a member of the managing committee of the Arts Council of Pakistan. She died on 10 February 2016 in Karachi, aged 85.

A well-known personality in social welfare, literary Radio, TV and theatre, Bajia wrote for PTV Centres Islamabad and Lahore since the launch of those television channels. She wrote her first long play Mehman. She contributed to literary programmes such as Auraaq and beauty care programmes under the title Aaraish-e-Khaam-e-Kakal. Bajia also produced various children's programmes. Bajia was also an ardent feminist.

== Early life ==
A native of Hyderabad, British India, she was born near Panj Bibi Mountain, in the town of Raichur in the present-day Indian state of Karnataka. She migrated to Pakistan soon after independence, along with her family. She was homeschooled and never received any formal education. Despite this she is ranked an eminent intellectual, reader and writer.

Talking about her childhood, she said,

"I never attended a formal school. The elders of the family decided that all my education should take place at home. The teacher lived in our home where we were taught discipline along with our education. My family was settled in Hyderabad Deccan, which was then a paramount cultural center in undivided India. Although there were a few prominent schools e.g. Saint Joseph's School, although my grandfather could afford the fee (which was Rs. 20), he still preferred to educate us at home. These schools were primarily attended by pampered girls from the elite families of nawabs and jagirdars. From the beginning we were taught self-sufficiency, although we employed 60 to 70 servants, we were not allowed to ask anyone of them for water. There was a huge difference between girls of the elite families and us. My grandfather felt that if we attended such schools, we would suffer from an inferiority complex, but since proper upbringing is not possible without coaching, he decided to carry out our education at home. Nevertheless, we were taught all the subjects that were taught in the formal Hyderabad schools with separate teachers for every subject e.g. calligraphy and math."

== Career ==
Bajia wrote her first novel, Muslim Samaj, at the age of 12.

Bajia first became involved with PTV in the 1960s when her flight to Karachi was delayed and she came to PTV Islamabad station for a visit. Director Agha Nasir hired her and Bajia made her debut as an actress in 1966 in one of his plays. She began writing afterwards. Nasir is quoted to have said,

"During Zia ul Haq's time when the 'dupatta policy' was implemented and women were forced to behave a certain way, Bajia wrote about characters from Baghdad and Granada. This was brilliant because these places were supposedly Islamic societies and no one could say anything about them."

He further added that when writing a play, Bajia would literally move with her belongings to the TV station and then become an authority by default.

"Anyone who had a problem would go to Bajia, not to the chief of the organisation."

== Awards, honours and recognition ==
Bajia won numerous awards, including the Pride of Performance Award in 1996 for her services to the performing arts in Pakistan. It is one of the highest civil awards conferred by the Pakistan Government. She was also awarded Japan's highest civil award in recognition of her works. She remained Advisor to the Chief Minister of Sindh province in Pakistan. In 1979 she was awarded Special Nigar Award for her contribution towards television and in 1985 she got another Nigar Award for best writer. Most recently she appeared in The Big Show on CNBC alongside another legendary writer Haseena Moin. In 2013, she was awarded Hilal-i-Imtiaz by the President of Pakistan.

On 22 May 2012 Bajia's biography, titled Apki Bajia (Your Bajia) was released. The book had been written by Syeda Iffat Hasan Rizvi after six years of research.

== Illness and death ==
Bajia died on 10 February 2016 in Karachi, at the age of 85 from throat cancer. Her body is interred at Gizri Graveyard.

== Tribute ==
On 1 September 2018, to commemorate what would have been her 88th birthday, Google released a Google Doodle celebrating her.

== Plays ==
Some of her popular drama serials:

- Shama 1974 (adapted from a novel by A.R. Khatoon)
- Afshan (adapted from a novel by A.R. Khatoon)
- Aroosa (adapted from a novel by Zubaida Khatoon)
- Tasweer (adapted from a novel by A.R. Khatoon)
- Zeenat (adapted from a Sindhi novel by Mirza Quleech Baig)
- Ana
- Aagahi
- Aabgeenay
- Babar
- Tareekh-o-Tamseel
- Ghar aik Nagar
- Faraz Aik Karz
- Phool Rahi Sarsoon
- Tasveer-e-Kainaat
- Asaavari
- Arzoo
- Sassi Punno
- Anarkali
- Auraq
- Jisse Piya Chahe

== See also ==
- Anwar Maqsood
- Zubaida Tariq
- Zehra Nigah
