= Shaukat Siddiqui =

Pakistani writer

- Born: 20 March 1923; Lucknow, Uttar Pradesh, British India (present day Lucknow, India)
- Died: 18 December 2006 (aged 83)
- Occupations: Journalist; Novelist
- Writing career
- Notable works: Khuda Ki Basti (1957); Jangloos (1987)
- Notable awards: Adamjee Literary Award
- Literary movement: Pakistan Writers' Guild; Progressive Writers Association

Shaukat Siddiqi (Urdu: شوکت صدیقی; 20 March 1923 – 18 December 2006) was a Pakistani writer of fiction who wrote in Urdu language. He is best known for his novels Khuda Ki Basti and Jangloos, the former of which won the Adamjee Literary Award in 1960.

== Early life and career ==
Siddiqi was born on 20 March 1923 in a literary family of Lucknow, British India. He gained his early education in his hometown and earned a B.A. in 1944, and did his M.A. in (Political Science) from Lucknow University at the age of 23. After the partition of India, he migrated to Pakistan in 1950 and stayed in Lahore, but soon permanently settled in Karachi. His early days in Pakistan were full of financial trouble and political opposition, which he soon overcame. He accompanied Zulfikar Ali Bhutto on several foreign tours.

He was an active member of the Pakistan Writers' Guild and of the Progressive Writers Association which was then and still is a part of the larger organization, the Progressive Writers Movement in the India-Pakistan subcontinent. Shaukat Siddiqui worked at the news desks of the Karachi newspapers Times, Pakistan Standard, and the Morning News. He finally got promoted to be the editor of the Karachi Urdu language newspapers Daily Anjaam, the Weekly Al-Fatah and the Daily Musawat, before finally saying goodbye to journalism in 1984.

== Literary work ==
Siddiqi's first short story, "Kaun Kisi Ka", appeared in Weekly Khayyam in Lahore, Pakistan. In 1952, his first collection of short stories, Teesra Admi, was published and proved to be a great success. Subsequently, other collections of short stories followed: Andhere Dur Andhere (1955), Raaton Ka Shehar (1956) and Keemya Gar (1984).

His magnum opus is Khuda Ki Basti (God's Own Land), which has appeared in 50 editions and has been translated into 26 languages. It has been dramatised time and again. Its English translation was by David Mathews of London University.

The novels Kamin Gah (1956), Jangloos (in three volumes, first volume dated September 1978), and Char Deewari (1990) are fictionalized accounts of his childhood in Lucknow, British India.

The last page of volume 1 of the novel Jangloos, carries the dateline "Karachi, September 1978". This is important because one year after the appearance of volume 1 of Jangloos, Amjad Islam Amjad wrote the screenplay for the Pakistan Television drama serial Waris which was broadcast in 13 one-hour-long episodes starting in December 1979. More importantly, the central plot and characters of Waris are identical to the plot and characters of Jangloos. However, Amjad Islam Amjad never acknowledged that he had adapted/copied Shaukat Siddiqui's novel Jangloos into the drama serial Waris.

- Teesra Admi (1952)
- Andhere Dur Andhere (1955)
- Raaton Ka Shehar (1956)
- Kamingah (1956)
- Khuda Ki Basti (1957)
- Keemyagar (1984)
- Jangloos (Part 1 of this novel is dated September, 1978)
- Char Deewari (1990)

== Awards and recognition ==
- 'Kamal-i-Fun' (Lifetime Achievement) Award in literature in 2003 by the Government of Pakistan in collaboration with the Pakistan Academy of Letters
- Adamjee Literary Award in 1960

== Death and legacy ==
He died on 18 December 2006 of cardiac arrest in Karachi at the age of 83, leaving behind a wife, two sons and three daughters.

Shaukat Siddiqui was known to use the technique of socialist realism in his writings and did not leave his characters in the quagmire of apathy and inaction. But, instead, tried to suggest to them to assert themselves and change their own destiny. He portrayed the life of a section of Karachi's poor very successfully in his writings. Siddiqui's commitment to the truth and his faith in the destiny of mankind guided him in his literary journey.
