= Tapish =

- Written by: Noorul Huda Shah
- Directed by: Sahira Kazmi
- Starring: Rubina Ashraf; Jamal Shah; Khalid Anum; Shafi Muhammad Shah
- Theme music composer: Arshad Mahmood
- Country of origin: Pakistan
- Original language: Urdu
- No. of episodes: 14

Production
- Producer: Sahira Kazmi

Original release
- Network: Pakistan Television Corporation
- Release: 1989 – 1989

Tapish is a Pakistani television serial, written by Noorul Huda Shah, and directed and produced by Sahira Kazmi. it depicts the struggles of student political activists against the Military dictatorship and the subsequent challenges and assaults in their journey. Rubina Ashraf, Jamal Shah, Khalid Anum, Shafi Muhammad Shah and Anwar Solangi starred. Sania Saeed debuted in the serial featured in a supporting role.

== Plot ==
Waleed Raza and Sara Riaz Hussain are college-fellows and work for the progressive group of a political party who works for the agitation of Marshall Law, which is held in the country. The students want to eradicate the politics from the college and support the Democracy. However, party's influential people including the newspaper person, Siraj-Uddin sees the students as their personal gains and make their impression bad by including a student Jamal in his plans. Waleed and all his friends are jailed for accusing of conducting a violent protest but Jamal is released shorty after despite his involvement in the violence. Sara questions Jamal about his values and insults him for his low self esteem, knowing that he works for Siraj-Uddin against the ideologies of the party. The enraged Jamal in return kidnaps her and assaults her physically at the evening when she was leaving for her house. Waleed returns from the jail and he learns about this accident. Initially hesitant Sara eventually meets her and he lends his full support to her. Seeing a gun to him, she asks him to throw it telling that she wants to punish him by fighting legally. However, when she discusses this with her parents, they deny her considering it a disgrace for them due to the fear of spreading of this news more. Waleed and his companions are rusticated from the university after jailed again for protesting in front of an affluent politician. However, Sara's cousin and Waleed's close friend, Ahsan, is released soon. As Sara's father gets retired from his job she struggles to get a job as his brother, Bilal, is also unemployed after his graduation. She goes to the party leader Ahmed Mujtaba's office to throw light on the issue of political prisoners. Inspired by her ideologies, he hires her as his press secretary.

Three years pess and no one knows about Waleed and his companions either they are alive in jail or not. Sara runs her responsibilities as a secretary successfully and Ahmed seems much satisfied with her performance. He proposes her and she agrees to become his second wife despite her initial determination of facing all the obstacles alone. After marriage, she creates a good bond with his first wife, Saba, and in some days his son, Taimoor, is also released from the jail. Sara is given the post of newspaper's incharge. It begins to reveal on Sara that Ahmed's sayings and actions are different when she tries to use newspaper to highlight the issue of political prisoners. Finding it against his election campaign and his political peers including Nisar Hussain, Ahmed tries to forbid her but with the help of Taimoor she does so. It creates a rift between their relationship and it deepens further when Sara comes across Jamal in Ahmed's office and begins to beat him. Ahmed learns about the accident and considering it a betray as she hadn't told him about this before marriage. She argues that if she has accept him with his past then why not he does? He eventually decides to divorce her and she leaves his house after he threats her of divorce.

Waleed returns from jail along with his companions. Sara informs her parents about her decision of divorce. Afterwards, everyone in the house gets happy about Bilal's future who gets a job in foreign. However, the police arrives before his departure and arrests him on the charges of involving in a few terrorism incidents. Nisar Hussain is revealed as a preparator of Bilal's imprisonment as Sara learns he had blackmailed his brother due to her assault, using Bilal as an agent to harm her. Saba urges Taimoor to help Sara in this tough situation and consequently Bilal gets bailed. Ahsan brings Waleed to met Sara and her parents. The comes across each other after years and talk. Waleed lends his support to her and leaves on a note of meet again. After Ahmed receives the ticket from the party for the upcoming elections, Waleed and his companions protest in front of his office. Waleed, who had gotten a strong position after his release, succeeds in his protest when party withdraws its decision of giving ticket to Ahmed. Siraj-Uddin summons Waleed to his office forcefully and tries to make him refrain in exchange of some big job but he denies. Sara also fights her case of assault legally but her culprit Jamal, who had also done so many crimes for Nisar Hussain, gets killed in a fake police encounter days before the court's final hearing. In the end, Waleed and Sara meet where Sara asks to resume his study and they both go to university. In the end, Ahsan announces that he'll marry Zahra, Sara's elder sister, whose hairs got white while seeking for a good match.

== Cast ==
- Rubina Ashraf as Sara Riaz Hussain
- Jamal Shah as Waleed Raza
- Khalid Anum as Ahsan
- Sania Saeed as Beena Riaz Hussain
- Kaiser Khan as Bilal Hussain
- Nabiha Sheikh as Zahra Riza Hussain
- Qaiser Naqvi as Hameeda Begum
- Mansoor Saeed as Riaz Hussain
- Roshan Atta as Amna Begum
- Sharafat Ali Shah as Akbar
- Zakiya Saleem as Nargis
- Ahad Salahuddin as Raja
- Faryal Akhtar as Nimmo
- Yasir Akhtar as Umer
- Shafi Muhammad Shah as Ahmad Mujtaba
- Yasmeen Ismail as Saba Mujtaba
- Mansoor Khalid as Taimoor Mujtaba
- Anwar Solangi as Siraj-Uddin
- Tariq Tirmazi as Jamal Mirza

== Production ==
Tapish was written by Noorul Huda Shah and is considered among her signature works along with Jungle and Ajaib Khana. It began to broadcast during the First Benazir Bhutto government when the portrayal of politicians on television was banned by the government but director Sahira Kazmi went on to depict them in the serial.

Tapish was Rubina Ashraf's second serial from the Karachi centre of PTV. It marked the debut television serial of Sania Saeed, and also marked Kaiser Khan's first Urdu television serial after his debut in a Sindhi serial.
