= Rubina Ashraf =

Pakistani actress

- روبینہ اشرف
- Born: 9 November 1960 (age 66); Lahore, Punjab, Pakistan
- Education: University of Lahore
- Occupations: Actress; Director; Producer
- Years active: 1980–present
- Spouse: Tariq Mirza (husband)
- Children: Minna Tariq (daughter)

Rubina Ashraf (Urdu: روبینہ اشرف; born 9 November 1960) is a Pakistani actress, director and producer. She was one of the most popular actresses of the 1980s and 1990s. Rubina appeared in classic PTV dramas such as Kasak, Hazaron Raaste, Sirriyan, Footpath Ki Ghaas, Tapish and Badaltey Mausam. She also appeared in dramas including Khuda Aur Muhabbat Season 3, Uraan, Gul-e-Rana and Do Bol.

== Early life and education ==
Rubina was born on 9 November 1960 in Lahore, Pakistan. She graduated in graphic designing from University of Lahore.

== Career ==
=== Acting ===
Rubina started her acting career in 1980, when during a visit to PTV Lahore centre with her friends she met Sahira Kazmi, who cast her in a drama. Then she worked in multiple dramas on PTV including Pas-e-Aaina, Tapish, Badaltey Mausam, Kasak, Footpath Ki Ghaas and Sirriyan.

=== Drama directing ===
Rubina directed many dramas including Vaani which received good reviews in 2008 and directed dramas Surkh Chandni, Ek Adh Hafta, Tarazoo and Tere Siwa. Then Rubina directed drama Shikwa in 2014. In 2020, Rubina directed drama Ruswai which became a hit.

== Personal life ==
Rubina married Tariq Mirza and has two children, a son and actress Minna Tariq is her daughter. She was diagnosed with COVID-19 during the COVID-19 pandemic in Pakistan and went into quarantine until she recovered.

== Filmography ==
=== Television series ===
Year	Title	Role	Notes
1982	Aisi Bulandi Aisi Pasti	Naila	PTV
1984	Andhera Ujala	Romana	PTV
1985	Ali Baba Aor Qasim Bhai	Marjana	PTV
1985	Footpath Ki Ghaas	Batool	PTV
1986	Hazaroon Khwahishain	Tahira	PTV
1986	Laikin	Lubna	PTV
1986	Hazaron Raaste	Mishal Qadir	PTV
1988	Seerhian	Shehnaz	PTV
1989	Junoon	Baaima	PTV
1989	Tapish	Sara Riaz Hussain	PTV
1990	Kacha Ghara	Lubna	PTV
1991	Guzar Jayegi Raat	Zubaida	PTV
1992	Kasak	Sabreena	PTV
1994	She Jee	Hareem Ahmed	NTM
1995	Badaltey Mausam	Imrana	PTV
1996	Pas-E-Aina	Shehla	STN
1997	Sawan Roop	Farah	PTV
1997	Azad	Mehreen	PTV
1998	Drama Hee Drama	Shiza	PTV
2000	Ab Yeh Mumkin Nahi	Saba	PTV
2002	Tere Siwa	Saima	PTV
2004	Khamosh	Nida	PTV
2005	Aik Aadh Hafta	Khalida	PTV
2008	Faiz Manzil ke Rozadar	Bano	PTV
2008	Mujhe Apna Bana Lo	Priya's mother	Hum TV
2009	Abhi Door Hai Kinara	Arslan's mother	PTV
2009	Band Khirkyon Kay Peechay (season 1)	Shafaq	
2009	Ishq Ki Inteha	Bakhtawar's mother	
2009	Tanveer Fatima (B.A)	Sidra	
2010	Yariyan	Babar's mother	
2010	Tumhe Kuch Yaad Hai Jaana	Mahnoor's mother	
2010	Mor Uss Gali Ka	Maryam	
2011	Mera Naseeb	Shazia's mother	
2011	Akhri Barish	Saira	
2011	Band Khirkyon Kay Peechay (season 2)	Shafaq	
2011	Mujhay Roothnay Na Daina	Nafeesa	
2011	Aurat Ka Ghar Kona	Iffat Aara	
2012	Behkawa	Maya's mother	
2012	Maseeha	Abish's mother	
2012	Talafi	Surayya	
2012	Raju Rocket	Sameen's mother	
2012	Hisar E Ishq	Begm Sahiba	
2013	Parchaiyan	Saliha	ARY Digital
2013	Matam	Ayla	
2013	Halki Si Khalish	Rania's mother	
2014	Kissey Apna Kahein	Zainab	
2014	Dil Nahi Manta	Shahana	
2015	Kitna Satatay Ho	Rabia's mother	
2015	Gul-e-Rana	Muniraa	
2016	Hatheli	Naheed	
2016	Manjdhaar	Saleema	
2016	Dil Haari	Muqaddas's mother	
2017	Be Inteha	Khadija	Urdu 1
2017	Main Maa Nahi Banna Chahti	Jibran's mother	
2017	Iltija	Sameer's mother	ARY Digital
2018	Ustani Jee	Kiran's mother	Hum TV
2018	Lamhay	Rukshana's mother	A-Plus
2018	Ru Baru Ishq Tha	Riffat Ara	
2019	Do Bol	Qudsia	
2019	Choti Choti Batain - Roop	Faryal	
2019	Rishtay Biktay Hain	Khalida	
2020	Uraan	Baaji	
2020	Makafaat Season 2	Asif's aunt	Geo Entertainment
2021	Khuda Aur Muhabbat Season 3	Bari Sarkar	
2022	Dil Zaar Zaar	Tani	
2022	Angna	Sania	
2022	Aik Sitam Aur	Naeema	
2022	Zakham	Saleha	Geo Entertainment
2022	Oye Motti Season 2	Aiza's mother	Express Entertainment
2023	Hostel	Suraiya	Aan TV
2024	Tum Bin Kesay Jiyen	Sarwat	ARY Digital
2024	Bayhadh	Yasmin	Geo Entertainment
2024	Hasrat	Riffat	ARY Digital
2024	Iqtidar	Saman Shah	Green Entertainment
2025	Dil Dhoondta Hai Phir Wohi	Laila	Express Entertainment

=== Telefilm ===
Year	Title	Role
2008	Aban Zafar	Aban's mother
2012	Saima Alone	Saima
2016	Bitiya Hamaray Zamanay Mein	Fahad's grandmother
2017	Huway Hum Jin Kay Liye Barbaad	Anju's mother
2021	Dil Ke Chor	Farhat

=== Film ===
Year	Title	Role
2004	Masoom	Sultana
2007	Women's Freedom	Masi
2011	Main Tum Aur Imran Hashmi	Chanda's mother
2016	Lahore Se Aagey	Nusrat

=== Director ===
- Rehney Do
- Surkh Chandni
- Tere Siwa
- Ek Adh Hafta
- Tarazoo
- Vaani
- Shikwa
- Ruswai

== Awards and nominations ==
Year	Award	Category	Result	Title	Ref.
2008	7th Lux Style Awards	Best TV Director Satellite	Nominated	Vanee	
2015	14th Lux Style Awards	Best TV Director	Nominated	Shikwa	
2023	PTV Icon Awards	National Icon Awards	Won	Herself	
