= Shafi Muhammad Shah =

Pakistani film and television actor

- شفیع محمد شاہ
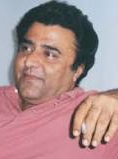
- Born: 7 September 1949; Kandiaro, Sindh; Pakistan
- Died: 17 September 2007 (aged 58); Karachi, Sindh, Pakistan
- Occupation: Actor
- Years active: 1972–2007
- Children: 6

Shafi Muhammad Shah (Urdu: شفیع محمد شاہ) PP (7 September 1949 – 17 November 2007), commonly known as Shafi Mohammad, was a Pakistani film and television actor.

Popularly known as Shah Jee, he worked in some 500 television dramas in both Urdu and Sindhi, while also starring in some notable movies, such as Biwi Ho To Aisi (1982), Aisa Bhi Hota Hai (1984), Talash (1986) and Rubi (1986).

== Early life ==
Shafi was born in Kandiaro, Naushahro Feroze District, Sindh, and got his early education in Hyderabad before earning a postgraduate degree from the University of Sindh, Jamshoro.

== Career ==
Shafi began his career with plays broadcast by Radio Pakistan's Hyderabad station and later moved to Karachi and began his career as a TV actor.

His first TV appearance was in the Sindhi-language play Moti-a Jehro Mann-e, telecast in 1972.

Shah was introduced by the well known PTV producer Shahzad Khalil in his Urdu drama serial Teesra Kinara from where he joined the elite club of the country's leading TV stars.

== Social activism ==
On 12 March 2004, Shafi joined UNICEF and WHO efforts to help persuade parents to get their minor children vaccinated against polio.

== Death ==
Shafi died in his sleep at his Clifton home on 17 November 2007. His funeral prayers were offered at Imambargah Yasreb in the Defence Housing Authority. He was buried in the Defence graveyard. The cause of death was liver failure.

== Tribute and honours ==
In 1985 he received the best actor award from Pakistan Television.

The day following his death, participants at a Karachi Press Club (KPC) meeting paid tribute to Shafi. In the meeting organised by the KPC's cultural committee, numerous artists, including Anwar Solangi, Manzoor Qureshi and Mumtaz Kanwal, turned up to pay their respects to the actor they had known and loved.

On 16 November 2008, the first death anniversary of Shafi Mohammad Shah, a book titled "Wo aadmi tha ya moti dana? (transl. Was he a human being or a pearl?)", authored by Nagina Hisbani on the life and artistic performance of Shah, was launched. The launching ceremony was organised by the Sindh Fankaar Welfare Trust, at the Mumtaz Mirza Auditorium.

He was also a recipient of the Pride of Performance award from the President of Pakistan.

== Selected filmography ==
=== Film ===
Year	Title	Role	Notes
1982	Biwi Ho To Aisi		
1984	Aisa Bhi Hota Hai		
1986	Ruby		
1993	Ilzam		
1995	Muskurahat		
2004	Salakhain		

=== Television series ===
Year	Title	Role	Network	Notes
1980	Teesra Kinara	Babar Kamal	PTV	
1981	Afshan	Mohsin Mumtaz	PTV	
1985	Aakhri Chattan	Khalifa Mustansar	PTV	
1986	Jungle	Sawan	PTV	
1989	Tapish	Ahmed Mujtaba	PTV	
1991	Zeenat	Allah Dad	PTV	
1993	Aanch	Jalees	PTV	
1995	Chand Grehan	Lal Hussain Shah	STN	
1995	Chotay Baray Log	Shafiq	PTV	
1996	Noori Jam Tamachi	Jam Tamachi	PTV	
1997	Zahar Baad	Fayaz	PTV	
1998	Baazi	Hafiz Shah	STN	
2000	Badlon Par Basera	Raza	PTV	
2003	Dohri	Khadim Hussain	ARY Digital	
2004	Maa Aur Mamta	Aftab	PTV	Episode "Mannat"

=== Telefilms ===
Year	Title	Role
1991	Your's Obedient Servant	Salar
1992	Zara Si Aurat	Asad
1993	Talaash	Ahmed
1994	Adam Hawa aur Shaitaan	Hafeez

== Awards and nominations ==
	Ceremony	Category	Project	Result	Ref.
2005	1st Indus Drama Awards	Best Actor (Drama Series)	Maa Aur Mamta (Mannat)	Won	
1998	PTV Awards	Best Actor	Aanch	Won	

== See also ==
- List of Lollywood actors
