= Jungle (Pakistani TV series) =

Pakistani television series

- جنگل
- Genre: Drama
- Written by: Noorul Huda Shah
- Directed by: Haroon Rind
- Starring: Neelma Hasan; Ismael Shah; Sakina Samo; Usman Peerzada; Shafi Muhammad Shah; Kehkashan Awan
- Country of origin: Pakistan
- Original language: Urdu
- No. of seasons: 1
- No. of episodes: 20

Original release
- Network: PTV
- Release: 1984 – 1984

Jungle (Urdu: جنگل, lit. 'Jungle') is a Pakistani television drama series written by Noorul Huda Shah and directed by Haroon Rind. It aired on PTV. Set against a rural Sindhi backdrop, the series addresses feudalism and the position of women in feudal society, including the practice of marrying women to the Quran to prevent property division. It is among the best-known works of Noorul Huda Shah, who is also noted for the PTV dramas Marvi and Bebak.

== Plot ==
Jungle centres on Bahawal Khan, a man of noble lineage who has married three times. His son from his first marriage, Mehran Khan, grows up to be cruel and domineering. The narrative explores the consequences of feudal authority on family relationships and the lives of women bound by customary land and marriage customs.

== Cast ==
- Neelma Hasan as Popri
- Ismael Shah as Sikandar
- Sakina Samo as Mehtab
- Usman Peerzada as Sarang
- Shafi Muhammad Shah as Sawan
- Kehkashan Awan as Shehar Bano
- Saqi as Darya Khan
- Fareed Nawaz Baloch as Lakhmeer Khan
- Noor Muhammad Lashari as Chacha Manji
- Shehzadi as Safia Jiji
- Anwar Solangi as Aarab
- Mansoor Baloch as Mehran Khan
- Subhani Ba Yunus as Meeral
- Gulab Chandio as Sajjan
- Mehmood Siddiqui as Bahawal Khan
- Manzoor Murad as Punhal
- Qaiser Naqvi as Sukhan
- Mumtaz Kanwal as Ameer Zadi
- Yaqoob Zakaria as Popri's Father
- Roshan Atta as Mai Sabul
- Azra Mansoor as Hameeda
- Taj Niazi as Doctor
- Salahuddin Tunio as Yusaf Khan
- Zarina Baloch as Sadoori
- Yar Muhammad Shah as Chotay Saen
