= Dasht (TV series) =

- Title screen
- دشت
- Genre: Romance; Action; Drama
- Written by: Munnu Bhai
- Directed by: Abid Ali & F.H. Qureshi
- Starring: Atiqa Odho; Nauman Ejaz; Abid Ali; Naina; Asad Malik
- Music by: Wajid Ali Nashad
- Opening theme: "Dasht" by Ameer Ali Nashad
- Country of origin: Pakistan
- Original language: Urdu
- No. of seasons: 1
- No. of episodes: 22

Production
- Producer: Abid Ali
- Production locations: Gwadar, Balochistan, Pakistan
- Running time: Approx. 40-45 minutes
- Production company: Network Television Marketing (PVT) Ltd

Original release
- Network: Shalimar Television Network
- Release: 5 February – 2 July 1993

Dasht (Urdu: دشت, Dashh-th) (transl. Desert) is a 1993 Pakistani drama television series. It is a Balochi tribal love story directed by Abid Ali and F. H. Qureshi and written by Munnu Bhai. Noman Ijaz and Atiqa Odho acted in the lead roles alongside supporting cast of Ayub Khoso, Abid Ali, Noor Muhammad Lashari, Fazila Qazi, Naina, Asad Malik and Sabiha Khanum.

Dasht aired on 5 February 1993 on Pakistan's first private channel NTM, earning critical acclaim and was a major commercial success catapulting the onscreen pair of Odho and Ijaz to stardom. The audience appreciated their on-screen chemistry and the duo later worked together in several successful dramas including Nijaat (1993), Talaash (Telefilm 1994), Arzoo Jeenay Ki Tu Nahin (2014), and Khan (2017), and are often referred to as Pakistan television's most loved on-screen couple. The series was also the debut of Asad Malik's successful acting career.

The music was composed by Wajid Ali Nashad with the lyrics written by poet, critic, and playwright Atta Shad. The soundtracks of the series were also successful and popular. Odho's Balochi attire and jewelry and Ijaz's Balochi-style turban chaddar & Bughti Shalwar became a trend. Shugal Pakistan ranks the series amongst the "11 Unforgettable Classic Dramas of Pakistan".

== Plot ==
The story is set among three warring tribes in rural Balochistan (in Pakistan). Born into this tribal warfare are Shahtaaj Atiqa Odho and Balaaj Noman Ejaz. Despite being surrounded by violence all their lives, both are gentle souls with a love of music and poetry. While both are from opposing tribes - they ultimately fall in love! Fearing that their union could unite two tribes, the head of the third tries everything to stop this from happening. The Drama was a tale of unrequited love and parental opposition while the culture, thinking, and issues of tribes in Balochistan served as sidelines of Shahtaaj's (Atiqa Odho) and Balaaj's (Nauman Ejaz) story of two youngsters from rival tribes who fall in love.. The plot was a modern-day take on classic tragic romance stories such as Layla and Majnun, Heer Ranjha, and Romeo and Juliet.

== Cast ==
- Atiqa Odho as Shahtaaj
- Nauman Ejaz as Mir Balaaj
- Ayub Khoso as Mir Guwaraam
- Abid Ali as Shams Shah
- Shaista Jabeen as Duresham
- Naina as Hani
- Fazila Qazi as Sajjal
- Humaira Ali as the voice of Shahtaaj in the song "Rabab Kehta Hai"
- Asad Malik as Mir Bebarg Mehdi (Mir Balaaj and Shahtaj's son)
- Azra Aftab as Duresham's mother (Sardar Hamza Salari's sister)
- Noor Mohammad Lashari as Sardar Nadir Jumbail (Antagonist)
- Rasheed Naz as Sardar Zakaullah Mehdi (Father of Mir Balaaj Mehdi)
- Mohsin Gillani as Sardar Hamza Salari (Shahtaj's father and Mir Guwaraam's uncle) (dead)
- Sabiha Khanum as Dai mah
- Nayyar Ejaz as Shaikh Jumbail (son of Sardar Nadir Jumbail)
- Zahid Saleem as Nuro
- Robina Arshi as Sakeena

== Music ==
Dasht

Studio album
- Released: 1993
- Genre: Drama soundtrack
- Producer: Abid Ali

No.	Song	Singer(s)	Length
1.	"Pehlta Asman Hai Peghalta Aftab"	Ameer Ali Nashad	01:45
2.	"Washi e Bah"	Humaira Chaudhry	05:58
3.	"Yeh Ankhein Haseen Ankhein"	Humaira Chaudhry	05:59
4.	"Rabab Kehta Hai Muj Se"	Humaira Chaudhry, Ali Raza	04:26
5.	"Yeh Dil Bhi Zakhm Hai"	Humaira Chaudhry	02:30
6.	"Mein Ne Kushboo Ko Bhi Cho Kar Dekha"	Humaira Chaudhry	03:20

== Critical reception ==
In 1993, the onscreen pair of Atiqa Odho & Nauman Ejaz "shot into stardom" following the release of Dasht. According to critics "The drama which proudly displayed Baloch traditions, was memorable in terms of its dialogues, plot twists, superb acting, cinematography, and music." Dasht was Abid Ali's first self-produced and self-directed drama serial which became a hit project of its time and this happened to be the first-ever private production in Pakistan.
