= Hassam Qazi =

Pakistani actor (1961-2004)

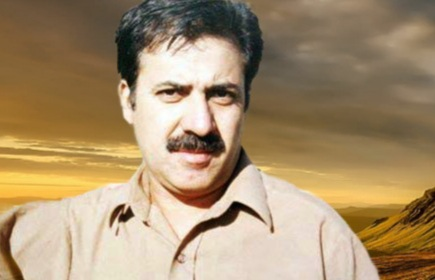
- Hassam Qazi during filming of a serial
- Born: 4 March 1961; Quetta, Pakistan
- Died: 3 July 2004 (aged 42–43); Karachi, Pakistan
- Occupations: Actor, television personality
- Years active: 1984–2004

Hassam Qazi (4 March 1961 – 3 July 2004) was a Pakistani actor and is considered one of the most acclaimed artists of PTV. He started his acting career in the 1980s and remained a busy actor until his death in 2004, performing in PTV classic dramas in Urdu as well as Balochi and Brahvi plays and serials.

== Early life and education ==
Hassam Qazi was born in 1961 in Quetta, Balochistan, Pakistan and after his early education he did his master's degree in commerce from Quetta University. He joined the education field and was appointed as a college lecturer which he retained throughout his life.

== Career ==
Qazi was interested in acting and joined Pakistan Television Corporation as an actor in the 1980s. He made his debut through the drama Khali Hath, produced by Dost Muhammad Gishkori at PTV Quetta Center. Despite his job as a lecturer, he successfully managed his acting career and appeared in many dramas produced by Quetta, Karachi and Islamabad centers. He got recognition through his drama Chaon which was directed by Kazim Pasha. His other famous dramas include Marvi, Dard Key Rishtey, Dais Pardais, Mitti Ki Moorat, Silsiley, Lab-e-Darya, Kashkol, Gharana, Mehrab Khan, Chakar-e-Azam and OOOSSS. Throughout his career, he won many awards.

== Death ==
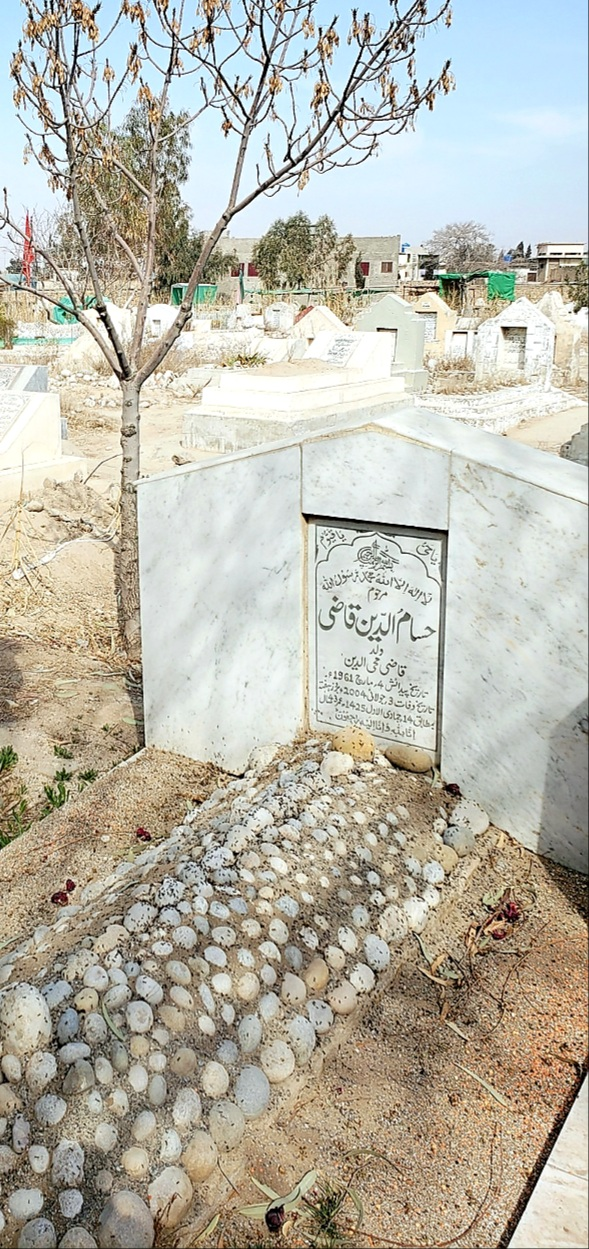
Qazi's last resting place at railways housing society Quetta

In 2000, Hassam Qazi was diagnosed with heart disease, due to which he settled down in Karachi for the treatment along with his family. On 3 July 2004, he died due to cardiac arrest. His body was taken to Quetta, his hometown, for burial and was laid to rest at Railways Housing Society graveyard. His last play was Miti ki moorat.

== Television series ==
| Year | Title | Role | Network |
|---|---|---|---|
| 1986 | Chhaon | Babar | PTV |
| 1990 | Chakar-e-Azam | Beuragh | PTV |
| 1990 | Pukaar | Motamid | PTV |
| 1990 | Sumbal | Jalal Khan | PTV |
| 1991 | Sangchoor | Jahanzeb | PTV |
| 1992 | Violin aur Munazza | Sarmad | PTV |
| 1993 | Kashkol | SSP | NTM |
| 1993 | Marvi | Umer | PTV |
| 1994 | Shantul | Sanjar Khan | PTV |
| 1995 | Rait | Nooru | PTV |
| 1996 | Wapsi | Yousuf | PTV |
| 1996 | Aahan | Sher | PTV |
| 1999 | Des Pardes | Manzoor Hussain | PTV |
| 2000 | Mera Qya Kasoor | Khawar | PTV |
| 2003 | Mitti Ki Moorat | Taj | PTV |
| 2003 | OOOSSS | Dr. Ahsan | PTV |
| 2004 | Naseeb | Shaukat | PTV |
