= Neelma Hasan =

Pakistani actress

- نیلمہ حسن
- Born: 28 February 1970 (age 56); Karachi, Pakistan
- Other names: The Dentonic Girl
- Education: University of Karachi
- Occupations: Actress; Model
- Years active: 1985 – present
- Spouse: Zulfikar (husband)
- Children: 4

Neelma Hasan is a Pakistani actress. She is known for her roles in dramas Naqsh Hain Sab Natamam, Gurez, Jungle, Zangar and Paiman-e-Wafa. She was known as The Dentonic Girl because of working in the commercials for Dentonic toothpaste.

== Early life ==
Hasan was born in Karachi at Pakistan and she studied from PECHS College and graduated from University of Karachi.

== Career ==
Hasan was noticed by a PTV director at her friend's house when they were shooting a commercial. Then he approached her and asked her to appear in a commercial which she accepted. She started working as a model and has worked in 50+ commercials with top brands including Rexona, Dentonic, Philips, Hilal sweets, Kiwi shoe polish, Roohafza, Sunsilk, Raseeli Supari, Kala Kola, Rafhan, Asli pari dhaga, National Paints, and several lawn commercials.

Then she worked in many dramas including Shikast-e-Arzoo, Burzakh, Gurez, Gard, Kallo, and in drama Jungle which was written by Noorul Huda Shah in which she portrayed the role of Popri.

In 1986 she worked in drama Paiman-e-Wafa with Asif Raza Mir and Qavi Khan in which she did the role of a doctor from Pakistan who travels to China to learn acupuncture, a key component of traditional Chinese medicine the drama was a collaboration between China and Pakistan which revolves around the different forms of hockey played in Pakistan and China the drama was also aired in China and was dubbed in Chinese.

In 1988 she worked in drama Shikast-e-Arzoo with Rizwan Wasti, Talat Hussain and Laila Zuberi which was written by Hameed Kashmiri and directed by Kazim Pasha.

In mid 1990's she appeared in famous mini serial aired on PTV Kanwal. In late 1990s she moved abroad to Canada at Toronto with her husband and there she did modeling for Indian brands and hosted a morning show on Sunday weekends.

In 2004 she worked in drama Matta-e-Gharoor it was written by Ashfaq Ahmed and directed by Nasir Iqbal it starred Qavi Khan, Samina Tabbasum and Shahid Awan in which she portrayed the role of Maria a doctor who helps her patient portrayed by Qavi Khan. The drama was a collaboration between Canada and Pakistan it was shot in Toronto at Canada.

In 2008 she worked in drama Sookhey Pattey with Uzma Gillani, Saud, Farah Shah and Sunita Marshall which was directed by Ayub Khoso.

In 2009, she co-starred with Bollywood actress Farida Jalal and Pakistani actress Armeena Khan in Dolly Aunty Ka Dream Villa which aired on Geo Entertainment.

Then she hosted The Mother's Show in 2010 on ARY Digital in which she interviewed many actors and actresses.

In 2013 she worked in some dramas for private channels and she also produced some dramas and musical shows.

== Personal life ==
Hasan is married to Zulfikar. They have lived in the U.S., Canada, and is settled in Dubai with her family. Hasan has four children.

== Filmography ==
=== Television ===
Year	Title	Role	Network
1985	Kallo	Shireen	PTV
1985	Rang-e-Hina	Uzma	PTV
1986	Jungle	Popri	PTV
1986	Paiman-e-Wafa	Rabia	PTV
1987	Naqsh Hain Sab Natamam	Sofia	PTV
1988	Shikast-e-Arzoo	Mona	PTV
1988	Burzakh	Huma	PTV
1989	Gard	Shaista	PTV
1990	Dharti Dhani	Bakhtawar	PTV
1991	Gurez	Roha	PTV
1993	Nangey Paon	Zahida	PTV
1994	Saher Se Door	Jahanara	PTV
1995	Kanwal	Kanwal	PTV
2004	Matta-e-Gharoor	Maria	Geo Entertainment
2008	Sookhey Pattey	Sabeen	Geo TV
2009	Dolly Aunty ka Dream Villa	Laila	Geo Entertainment
2022	Star & Style Season 3	Herself	PTV

=== Telefilm ===
Year	Title	Role
1992	Ju Gehrai Me Gaey	Ishrat

=== Host ===
Year	Title	Role	Network
2010	The Mother's Show	Herself	ARY Digital
