= Malik Anokha =

Pakistani actor (1943–2008)

Malik Anokha (1943—2008, Age: 65 years) (Sindhi: ملڪ انوکو; Urdu: ملک انوکھا) was a Pakistani film, television, stage and radio actor from Mirpur Khas, Sindh.

== Life and work ==
Anokha was fluent in several languages. His career spanned more than forty years, during which he acted in a number of media, both within Pakistan and abroad, including the European film Traffik. He mostly acted in Sindhi films and dramas in the 1960s and early 1970s. After the decline of the Sindhi film industry, Anokha moved to Lahore and worked in films, television shows, and theater. In the early 1980s, he returned to Karachi and worked in television and on the stage. Until the end of his life, he remained associated with the entertainment industry.

He earned many awards in his career including the Nigar Awards and the NTM Viewers Choice Awards for best actor for the drama serial Kashkol, and also received an award from the culture department of the government of Sindh for his performance in the theater drama Azadi Kay Mujrim.

Malik Anokha died on 26 July 2008 due to a heart attack. He was buried at the Sakhi Hassan graveyard in Karachi. He was survived by his widow, three daughters and a son.

== Filmography ==
- Aisa Bhi Hota Hai
- Chori Chupay
- Shehro Feroze
- Munjho Piar Pukarey
- Badal Ain Barsat
- Rut Ja Rishta
- Dharti Lahe Kunwar
- Dharti Dilwaran Ji
- Aj Ta Bhakar Payon
- Hazir Saien
- Umeed
- Hakim Khan
- Toofan
- Dushman
- Mahran Ja Moti
- Beus
- Meeran Jamali
- Dubai Chalo
- Saima
- Panuu Aqil
- Jeejal Maah
- Methra Shar Milan
- Ghughant Lahy Kunhar
- Dharti Dilwaran Ji
- Pyar Kiyo Singhar
- Albeli
- Kismat
- Sodha Putt Sindh Jaa
- Gharat Jo Sawal
- Janwar
- Naam Ka Nawab
- Khush Naseeb
- Gabroo
- Minzil
- Shikanja
- Mafroor
- Double Cross
- Sarjant
- Dard

== Dramas ==
- Chanan Te Darya
- Tajay Ki Bethak
- Wah Punhal Wah
- Jag Beti
- Dubai Chalo
- Aik Haqeeqat Sau Afsanay
- Karwan
- Barzakh
- Seerihan
- Mandi
- Nijaat
- Ba Adab Ba Mulahiza Hoshiar
- Akhero
- Parbhat
- Kashkol
- Fankar Gale
- Hum To Chalay Susral
- Wah Bhai Wah
- Kantoon Say Agay
- Barish
- Nimmo Papad Wali
- Wahi Khuda Hai
- Amar Bail
- Kala Pul
- Babu Bay Qaboo
- Baat Bay Baat
- Bhaj Punhal Bhaj
- Khwab Suhanay
- Janam
- Pani Ka Ghar
- Kya Baat Hai
- Waris
- Ramzan Mirza Section Officer
- Ishrat Baji
- Ghora Ya Gaari
- Cheh Chitto
- Halat
- Pehla Chand
- Shughal-e-Azam
- Yes Sir
- Ajanabi
- Hal Punhal Hal

== See also ==
- List of Lollywood actors
