= Ab Yeh Mumkin Nahi =

2000 Pakistani television series

- Written by: Fasih Bari Khan
- Directed by: Atif Hussain
- Starring: Noman Ijaz; Shagufta Ejaz; Rubina Ashraf; Shahood Alvi
- Theme music composer: Tajamul Hussain
- Opening theme: Masood Khan; Sheeloo Khan
- Country of origin: Pakistan
- Original language: Urdu
- No. of episodes: 13

Production
- Producers: Tazim Alley; Ahmed Hussain
- Cinematography: Mehmood Mirza; Feroz Yousuf; Anu Malik
- Editor: Musavir Hassan

Original release
- Release: 2000 – 2000

Ab Yeh Mumkin Nahi is a Pakistani television series, written by Fasih Bari Khan, directed by Syed Atif Hussain. It features Noman Ijaz, Shagufta Ejaz and Rubina Ashraf caught in a love triangle, while the other cast members were Sadia Hussain, Sehar Afzal, Shahood Alvi and Tahir Ali.

== Plot ==
Samra, Tazeen and Alia are working women and share the same room in a hostel. Alia is loved by Tahir, and through Tahir, his friend Khalid comes across Tazeen when Khalid asks Alia to convince one of her friend to act in his theater play. Samra, comes off from a broken family, and loves Sajjad, an affluent business man who is married to Saba and having a son, Ali, from her. Samra eventually decide to marry to marry Sajjad but her friends are not in favour of her marriage with a married man. Saba also warns her repeatedly not to marry her husband but she ignores her. Saba also struggles on her behalf to save this almost broken relationship. Khalid falls for Tazeen in the short time and proposes to her. After an initial hesitation, she feels an inclination towards him. Alia visits her ailing mother in Mirpur Khas, who is coping with family politics and takes care of her agricultural lands, and returns. While Samra parents themselves visit her to make her refrain from not marrying Sajjad but she denies. She asks Sajjad to divorce Saba as she does want to become his second wife. Khalid becomes sad when Tazeen informs him that her parents want her to shift with them, in London. But later he accepts her decision and she leaves on a promise of returning after an year. After consistent struggles to save her home, Saba eventually gives up and decides to prioritise herself. For this purpose, she decides to fulfill her unfulfilled dream of becoming a singer and joins a music class. After divorce from Sajjad, she leaves her house and shifts with Marium Aapa, the elder sister of her mentor, Bukhari. She begins to take part in her passion actively and gets an offer for her music album. Her preparations for the album and Sajjad's engagements regarding his marriage with Samra lead to ignoring Ali. After Tazeen's departure, Khalid looks for her replacement to act in the play and learns about Saba who has recently shifted in the area. After Samra and Tazeen leave the hostel, Alia also goes to her ailing mother where she learns that her stepfather has sold her mother house to the feudal landlord, Sultan Shah, against her will. She requests Sultan Shah to return their house which her mother loves utmost. He agrees but only on the condition of marrying him. Unwillingly, for the sake of her mother she agrees and becomes his fourth wife. Receiving no information about Alia for many days, Tahir gets worried in Karachi. He goes to Mirpur Khas to look her but couldn't find. Saba agrees and sings for the play of Khalid. They both become begin to a share a great bond with each other over the time. Samra learns about Sajjad's secret meetings with Ali and forces her to stop meeting his son. She meets Saba and even accuses her of interfering in her and Sajjad's life through Ali. Alia's mother dies shortly after her marriage. Sultan Shah's special attention towards her makes his first three wives against her especially the third wife, Kulsoom. Tahir receives a call from Tazeen, informs Khalid about it and also asks her to keep some distance from Saba as Tazeen is waiting for her. When Kulsoom gets no attention from Sultan Shah despite her lot of struggles, she kills him by poison. Tahir notices the change in Khalid and eventually meets Saba and tells her about Khalid's past and Tazeen. Khalid arrives there and despite this revelation Saba proposes Khalid. They get married after Saba leaves Marium's house. However, at the wedding night Ali leaves the house and gets lost somewhere. Saba suspects that Sajjad has hidden him while Sajjad considers it some plan of Saba. However, they eventually find out his dead body at a hospital. Tazeen meets Khalid and shatters completely when learns about his marriage. She however accepts the reality and leaves him away for the while. But later she leads on him and wishes to reconcile. Instead of remain loyal to her wife Saba, Khalid instantly agrees and divorces Saba when Tazeen puts condition of his divorce. Tahir comes across Alia at a shrine but she refuses to greet him. But, she meet him in Karachi after days and shares her whole story but refuses to enter in his life. Tazeen however suggests her to accept Tahir's proposal. Despite Ali's death and Saba's divorce after marriage, tensions don't reduce between Samra and Sajjad. Instead, Samra's condition deteriorates and she begins to experience fits. Her mother visits her in hospital and blames Sajjad for her condition but he holds a mirror for her that the toxic relationship of her and her husband and had made her a psychiatric patient. Khalid runs towards Tazeen to the airport where she refuses to marry him citing his fickle, and goes away leaving the country. Samra's condition worsens and Sajjad admits her to the psychiatric ward permanently. Alia and Tahir eventually married after Alia agrees.

== Cast ==
- Noman Ijaz as Sajjad
- Shagufta Ejaz as Samra
- Sadia Hussain as Alia
- Sehar Afzal as Tazeen
- Shahood Alvi as Khalid
- Tahir Ali as Tahir
- Rubina Ashraf as Saba
- Raza Zaidi as Ali
- Badar Khalil as Marium Aapa
- Moona Junejo as Kulsoom
- Kulsoom Sultan as Amma
- Saqib Sheikh as Abba
- Anwar Solangi as Sultan Shah
- Zaheen Tahira as Roshan
- Roshan Atta as Rabia
- Shahzadi as Zareena
- Nasreen Shagufta as Zeenat
- Hassan Zia as Sajju
- Riaz Chugtai as Bukhari
- Javeria Jalil as Skaina

== Production ==
It was the first television serial of Fasih Bari Khan, who had previously wrote the long-plays Jab Koi Doosra Nahi Hota and Jadoo.

== Reception ==
In a review of the first-eight episodes of the series, Rashid Sami of the DAWN Images praised the direction stating that the "multi-track story intelligently handled by Atif Husain".
