= Naina (actress) =

Pakistani actress

- نینا
- Born: Yawar Sultana; 22 June 1971; Lahore, Pakistan
- Died: 7 November 1996 (aged 25); Lahore, Pakistan
- Other name: Doe-eyed Beauty
- Occupations: Actress; Model; Dancer
- Years active: 1987 – 1996
- Parents: Ghulam Hussain (father); Sahira Begum (mother)

Yawar Sultana, also known as Naina (Urdu; نینا; born 1971) was a Pakistani actress and model. She was known for her deep blue eyes and was known as Doe-eyed Beauty. She was known for her roles in classic dramas Dasht, Sadran and Red Card.

== Early life ==
Sultana was born to Sahira Begum and Ghulam Hussain in a family of musicians in Lahore, Pakistan. She was trained in classical dance by her mother; later, she would earn money by dancing at private functions. She once created a legend of earning 5.6 lakh rupees from a mujra performance. Then, she was noted by a television director who offered her work in commercials on PTV.

== Career ==
Naina worked as a model in many commercials and advertisements during the 1980s on the PTV. Later she would also do dance performances at certain events because of which she would earn a lot. She also used to do dancing roles in films.

Later she got interested in acting and chose to quit dancing and in 1990 joined Pakistan's first private TV channel Network Television Marketing and would appear in commercials for NTM.

In 1993, F.H. Qureshi told Naina to audition for Dasht, a new drama he was directing. After she auditioned, she was approved by Abid Ali and officially cast. She portrayed Hani, who is in love with Shams Shah (portrayed by Abid Ali), but the two face problems when they marry. The serial was a super-hit and won many accolades.

In 1994 she appeared in PTV's family drama Sadran, in which she portrayed the role of a working-class girl. Later in 1994 she was invited by Tariq Aziz at his show Nilaam Ghar and she sanged a song on his request. Then in 1995 she appeared in show Hip Hip Hurray Season 1 on STN the show was hosted by Umer Shareef in which she got an award. Also in 1995, she was cast in the drama Red Card, which aired on STN. She portrayed Almas, a dancer who falls in love with a businessman, but the couple are unable to be together because of Almas's background.

In 1996 she appeared in season 2 of Hip Hip Hurray. She received an award for her performance from Umer Shareef.

== Personal life ==
Naina lived with her parents in Faisal Model Town, Lahore.

== Death ==
On 7 November 1996, Naina was shot at her home in Lahore. She was buried in Miani Sahib Graveyard. Her mother died some years later, and she was buried near her grave.

== Filmography ==
=== Television ===
Year	Title	Role	Network
1993	Dasht	Hani	NTM
1994	Nilaam Ghar	Herself	PTV
1994	Sadran	Anila	PTV
1995	Hip Hip Hurray Season 1	Herself	STN
1995	Red Card	Almas	STN
1996	Hip Hip Hurray Season 2	Herself	STN

== Awards and nominations ==
Year	Award	Category	Result	Title	Ref.
1995	STN Awards	Best New Talent	Won	Hip Hip Hurray Season 1	
1996	STN Awards	Best Talent	Won	Hip Hip Hurray Season 2	
