= Marvi (actress) =

Pakistani actress (1974–1998)

- ماروی
- Born: Ayesha Aziz; 20 March 1974; Hyderabad, Sindh, Pakistan
- Died: 25 August 1998 (aged 24); Karachi, Pakistan
- Cause of death: Murder
- Resting place: Karachi
- Occupation: Actress
- Years active: 1997–1998

Ayesha Aziz (Urdu: ماروی; March 20, 1974 – August 25, 1998), popularly known as Marvi, was a Pakistani actress. She was one of the few Sindhi actresses that made a career in Lollywood.

== Early life ==
She was born in Hyderabad, Sindh. She was interested in acting from a young age. After graduating from Government College, she went to Karachi where she made her debut in the Urdu film Aanchal, a super hit film at the box office, in a lead role.

== Career ==
Hailing from Sindh, Marvi became one of the few Sindhi actresses to make a career in Lollywood industry. The actress had a promising career in the film industry, quickly becoming popular despite her tragically short career. Marvi was the lead actress in the hit film Marvi, starring alongside fellow actor Faisal Qureshi. She starred in total 4 films, with Marvi being her last, which was released after her death.

== Death ==
Marvi's career had barely started when she was brutally murdered by an unknown person or animal on 25 August 1998.

The incident took place in Karachi, where a supposed jealous lover shot her in her car near a traffic signal on Tariq Road. Her dead body remained in the car for a number of hours until help arrived. Sadly, by the time the emergency services arrived, she was already dead.

The murderer remains unknown after fleeing the scene, and the case remains unsolved. No arrests have been made. In the past, many other Lollywood actresses, namely Niggo, Nadira, Karishma Shah, Sangam and more have shared a similar fate.

== Filmography ==
=== Film ===
Year	Title	Language
1997	Aanchal	Urdu
2000	Marvi	Urdu
