= Shaista Jabeen =

Pakistani actress

- Born: 29 June 1964 (age 61); Quetta, Pakistan
- Occupation: Actress
- Years active: 1993–present
- Spouse: Single

Shaista Jabeen (born 29 June 1964) is a Pakistani television actress. She appeared in PTV's classic serials in the 1990s. She started acting in television around 1993–94 and has acted in more than 50 serials. Her notable TV dramas are Dasht, Aaghosh, Duniya Dari and Beti.

== Early life ==
Jabeen was born on 29 June 1964, in Quetta, Baluchistan.

== Acting career ==
Jabeen started her acting career in stage dramas during the 1980s. Then she was cast in Pakistan television dramas. Initially she performed in small supportive roles. She got her first breakthrough as a TV actress in drama "Dasht" (1993). Drama "Aaghosh" from PTV (1991) made her a notable TV actress.

== Selected television work ==
Year	Title	Role	Network
1993	Dasht	Duresham Naina	PTV Home
1991	Aaghosh		PTV Home
1995	Ye Raah Mushkil Nahi		PTV Home
	Duniya Dari		PTV Home
	Ye Raah Mushkil Nahi		PTV Home
2006	Beti	Mehru mother	Ptv home
2012	Mil Ke Bhi Hum Na Mile	Yasmeen's mother	Geo TV
2012	Teri Raah Main Rul Gai		Urdu 1
2014	Yeh Ishq	Mishkaat's mother	ARY Digital
2014	Saari Bhool Hamari Thi		Geo TV
2014	Mera Dard Na Janay Koi	Hina's mother	Hum TV
2014	Chhoti	Rasheeda	Geo Entertainment
2014	Ladoon Mein Pali	Laraib's mother	Geo TV
2015	Susraal Mera	Jabbar's wife	Hum TV
2016	Khushaal Susral	Nafeesa	ARY Zindagi
2016	Besharam	Khadija; Haider's mothee	ARY Digital
2016	Be Inteha		Urdu 1
2016	Hamari Bitya		ARY Zindagi
2017	Andaaz-e-Sitam		Urdu 1
2017	Larka Karachi Da Kuri Lahore De		Express Entertainment
2017	Bedardi Saiyaan		Geo TV
2017	Tishnagi Dil Ki	Zuhair's mother	Geo TV
2017	Rishtay Kachay Dhagoon Se		A-Plus TV
2018	Kahan Ho Tum	Salma Jahan	A-Plus TV
2018	Haiwan		ARY Digital
2018	Mera Haq	Salma	Geo TV
2018	Meri Guriya	Dabeer's mother	ARY Digital
2018	Mere Khudaya	Aleena's mother	ARY Digital
2019	Wafa Lazim To Nahi		PTV Home & TvOne Global
2019	Mera kya qasoor	HaniA mother	A Plus TV
2019	Yaariyan	Abida; Ahmer's mother	Geo TV
2019	Zid		Express TV
2019	Gul-o-Gulzar	Kaneez; Gul's mother	ARY Digital
2019−2020	Ramz-e-Ishq	Umer's mother	Geo TV
2021	Ishq Jalebi	Aniqa	
