= Madiha Rizvi =

Pakistani actress (born 1987)

- Born: Syed Madiha Rizvi; Riyadh, Saudi Arabia
- Education: University of Lahore
- Occupation: Actress
- Years active: 2000 – present
- Spouse(s): Junaid Ali Pervaiz (m. 2024) Hassan Noman (m. 2013, div. 2022)
- Children: 2
- Parent(s): Deeba (mother); Naeem Rizvi (father)
- Relatives: Imran Rizvi (brother); Rasheed Naz (Former father-in-law)

Madiha Rizvi is a Pakistani actress. She is known for her roles in dramas Kahin Deep Jaley, Aik Thi Rania, Piya Naam Ka Diya, Mere Meherbaan, Parizaad, Aangan, Sammi, Rajo Rocket, and Chaudhry and Sons. She is the daughter of film actress Deeba.

== Career ==
Rizvi made her debut as an actress in 2000 on PTV and appeared in dramas with her mother Deeba. Then she appeared in dramas Meray Qatil Meray Dildar, Kitni Girhain Baaki Hain, Raju Rocket and Bari Aapa. She is usually typecast in the roles of sister-in-law or elder sister in dramas such as Aatish, Bandhay Aik Dor Say, Kahin Deep Jaley and Parizaad. However, she portrayed different characters in Aangan and Sammi.

== Personal life ==
The couple got divorced in November 2022.

In 2024 she married her cousin Junaid Ali Pervaiz, the son of her maternal uncle.

Her brother Imran Rizvi is also an actor.

== Filmography ==
=== Television ===
Year	Title	Role	Network	Ref(s)
2011	Zindagi Dhoop Tum Ghana Saya	Kulsoom	ARY Digital	
2011	Meray Qatil Meray Dildar	Faria	Hum TV	
2011	Kitni Girhain Baaki Hain	Ashi	Hum TV	
2012	Raju Rocket	Tania Madam	Hum TV	
2012	Sasural Ke Rang Anokhay	Maria	Hum TV	
2012	Badi Aapa	Riffat	Hum TV	
2013	Gohar-e-Nayab	Romy	A-Plus	
2013	Dil-e-Muztar	Nabeela	Hum TV	
2013	Meri Maa	Nimra	Geo Entertainment	
2014	Mere Meherbaan	Fala Ayan	Hum TV	
2015	Akeli	Shahnaz	Hum TV	
2015	Tere Baghair	Saima Nasir	Hum TV	
2016	Dil Banjaara	Zahra	Hum TV	
2017	Jithani	Zara	Hum TV	
2017	Sammi	Zulekha	Hum TV	
2017	Adhoora Bandhan	Atiya	Geo Entertainment	
2017	Aik Thi Rania	Kiran	Geo Entertainment	
2018	Mere Bewafa	Muskan	A-Plus	
2018	Aangan	Aaliya's mother	Hum TV	
2018	Aatish	Nazia	Hum TV	
2019	Piya Naam Ka Diya	Razia	Geo TV	
2019	Makafaat	Shaista	Geo TV	
2019	Kahin Deep Jaley	Naila	Geo TV	
2020	Bandhay Aik Dor Say	Nazia	Geo TV	
2020	Jhooti	Zubia	ARY Digital	
2021	Makafaat Season 3	Rabia	Geo Entertainment	
2021	Sirat-e-Mustaqeem	Nageena	ARY Digital	
2021	Phaans	Shaista	Hum TV	
2021	Parizaad	Kubra	Hum TV	
2022	Dikhawa Season 3	Samira	Geo Entertainment	
2022	Makafaat Season 4	Annie	Geo Entertainment	
2022	Chaudhry and Sons	Sheeba	Geo Entertainment	
2022	Guddu	Noreen	Geo Entertainment	
2022	Farq	Rukhsana	Geo Entertainment	
2023	Makafaat Season 5	Mina	Geo Entertainment	
2023	Sirat-e-Mustaqeem Season 3	Maryam	ARY Digital	
2023	Ahsaas	Sadia	Express Entertainment	
2023	Muhabbat Gumshuda Meri	Sitara	Hum TV	
2024	Tere Mere Sapnay	Haseena	Geo Entertainment	
2024	Yahya	Sanobar Ali	Geo TV	
2024	Shehzadi House	Begum Absar	Green Entertainment	
2024	Bewafai	Hania	A-Plus	
2024	Kaash Main Shakeela Hoti	Jameela	Set Entertainment	
2025	Makafat Season 7	Aiman	Geo Entertainment	
2025	Ishq Di Chashni	Saba	Green Entertainment	
2025	Mann Mast Malang	Biya	Geo Entertainment	
2025	Jama Taqseem	Nighat	Hum TV	
2025	Case No.9	Medical Laboratory Officer	Geo TV	

=== Telefilm ===
Year	Title	Role
2010	Chanda Kaleem Aur Rani Aapa	Chanda
2011	Maamu	Mona
2013	Joru Ka Gulam	Zobia
2021	Romantic Razia	Shahida
2021	Pyaas	Guddu's mother

=== Film ===
Year	Title	Role
2009	Sukh Mein Dukh	Sarah
2014	Teddy Bear	Saira's mother
