= Raju Rocket =

Pakistani television series

- Genre: Comedy
- Written by: Imran Ali Safir
- Directed by: Saima Waseem
- Starring: Danish Taimoor; Sumbul Iqbal; Madiha Rizvi
- Country of origin: Pakistan
- Original language: Urdu
- No. of episodes: 86

Production
- Producer: Momina Duraid
- Production company: MD Productions

Original release
- Network: Hum TV
- Release: 27 August 2012 – 14 January 2013

Raju Rocket is a 2012 Pakistani comedy drama serial aired on the Hum TV. The serial was first aired on 27 August 2012; and was directed by Saima Waseem and written by Imran Ali Safir, starring Danish Taimoor, Sumbul Iqbal, Madiha Rizvi, Rubina Ashraf, Nadia Afghan and Qazi Wajid.

== Cast ==
- Danish Taimoor as Raju Rocket
- Sumbul Iqbal as Hina
- Madiha Rizvi as Tania Madam
- Rubina Ashraf as Tania's Mother
- Nadia Afghan as Sameen
- Qazi Wajid as Tania's Grandfather
- Rubina Arif as Sameen's Mother
- Sabahat Ali Bukhari as Nadeem's Mother
- Zaheen Tahira
- Afshan Qureshi
- Rashid Farooqui
