= Roag (2011 TV series) =

Pakistani television drama series

- Based on: Roag by Faiza Iftikhar
- Written by: Faiza Iftikhar
- Directed by: Babar Javed
- Theme music composer: Waqar Ali
- Opening theme: "Muhammad Ali"
- Country of origin: Pakistan
- Original language: Urdu
- No. of episodes: 20

Production
- Producers: Asif Raza Mir; Babar Javed
- Running time: 38–40 minutes
- Production company: A&B Entertainment

Original release
- Network: ARY Digital
- Release: 16 April – 27 August 2011

Roag is a Pakistani television drama series produced by Babar Javed and Asif Raza Mir under the A&B Entertainment banner. Written by Faiza Iftikhar and based on her novel of the same name, it was directed by Javed and premiered on ARY Digital on 16 April 2011. The series centres on a family dealing with the sexual abuse of one of their children and its enduring consequences. It features Faysal Qureshi, Sumbul Iqbal, Asif Raza Mir, Mohib Mirza, Yamina Peerzada, and Shagufta Ejaz. Its run of 20 episodes concluded on 27 August 2011.

== Plot ==
The series follows the story of a family whose parental neglect results in the sexual abuse of one of the children of the household. The narrative traces the aftermath and long-term consequences of the trauma the child carries through her life into adolescence.

== Cast ==
- Asif Raza Mir as Abid
- Faysal Qureshi as Ayaz
- Arisha Razi / Sumbul Iqbal as Nimra ("Nimmo")
- Shagufta Ejaz as Humaira
- Rida Asfahani
- Sara Umair as Sameera
- Mohib Mirza as Faiq
- Yamina Peerzada
- Lubna Aslam
- Qaiser Naqvi as Humaira's mother
- Seemi Pasha
- Sajid Shah
- Kanwar Arsalan

== Reception ==
A reviewer for Dawn observed that the drama realistically portrayed the burden of shame and guilt a victim's family bears, noting a scene in which the family faces exploitation by a stranger on the eve of the daughter's nikah. In her academic study Women and TV Culture in Pakistan, Munira Cheema wrote that Roag had influenced not only viewers but also talk shows and their discussions of child sexual abuse.

== Awards ==
Year	Award body	Category	Recipient	Result	Ref.
2012	Lux Style Awards	Best TV Actor – Satellite	Faysal Qureshi	Won	
