= Aik Thi Rania =

Pakistani television series

- Genre: Social drama Family drama Love Story
- Written by: Madiha Shahid
- Directed by: Abdullah Badini
- Starring: Sumbul Iqbal; Syed Jibran
- Country of origin: Pakistan
- Original language: Urdu
- No. of episodes: 29

Production
- Producers: Abdullah Kadwani & Asad Qureshi (7th Sky Entertainment )
- Production location: Pakistan
- Editors: Farooq jawaid Shahbaz Ali Baloch
- Running time: Approx 40 Minutes

Original release
- Network: Geo Entertainment
- Release: 3 November 2017 – 8 June 2018

Aik Thi Rania is a 2017 Pakistani drama serial directed by Abdullah Badini, produced by 7th Sky Entertainment, and written by Madiha Shahid. The drama stars Sumbul Iqbal and Syed Jibran in lead roles, and premiered on 3 November on Geo Entertainment, being aired every Friday at 8:00 P.M.

== Storyline ==
The story revolves around the life of an intelligent, high-achieving, and passionate young woman, Rania, who becomes the victim of jealousy and is trapped by her classmate Fahad's fake professions of love so he can divert her from her studies.

== Cast ==
- Sumbul Iqbal as Rania
- Syed Jibran as Fahad
- Manzoor Qureshi as Aftab
- Munawar Saeed as Izhar
- Madiha Rizvi as Kiran
- Fahima Awan as Ayeza
- Humaira Bano as Zarina
- Jinaan Hussain as Shehzadi
- Beena Chaudhary as Tara
- Paras Masroor as Ayyaz
- Kinza Malik as Kausar
- Arsalan Raja as Haris
- Mizna Waqas as Salma Aapa
- Hannah Hameed as Adil

== Soundtrack ==
Aik Thi Rania OST

Soundtrack album by Ahmed Jahanzeb & Aima Baig
- Released: 1 November 2017
- Recorded: 2017
- Genre: Television soundtrack
- Length: (5:39)
- Language: Urdu
- Label: Geo Entertainment

Music video
- "Aik Thi Rania" OST on YouTube

The title song was sung by Ahmed Jahanzeb and Aima Baig. The music was composed by Naved Nashad and the lyrics were penned by Mubashir Hassan.

== Reception ==
The series was popular and gained high ratings. It was among the top ten dramas of the years in term of TRPs, of the year it was released.
