= Kandiaro =

- City
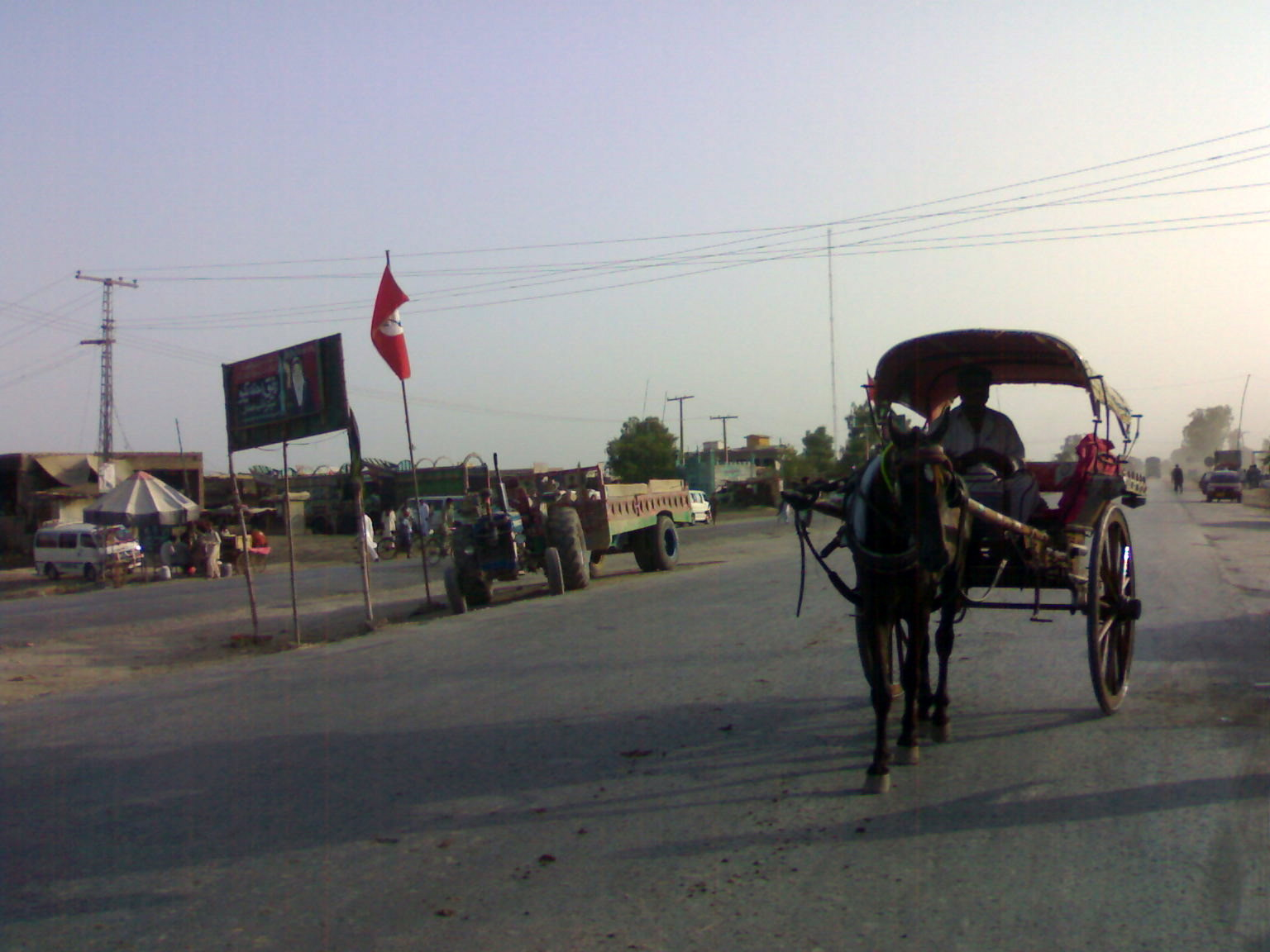
- N-5 road in Kandiāro, Pakistan

- Location in Pakistan
- Coordinates: 27°3′29″N 68°12′28″E
- Country: Pakistan
- Region: Sindh Province
- District: Naushahro Feroze
- Taluka: Kandiaro
- Union Council: Mohbat Dero, Pacca Ghanghra

Government
  - Type: Town council

Population (2023)
  - Total: 44,382
- Time zone: UTC+5 (PST)

Kandiaro (Urdu: كنڈيارو, Sindhi: ڪنڊيارو) is a town in the Naushahro Feroze District of Sindh province of Pakistan and the headquarters of Kandiaro Taluka. From this town is the start of Central Sindh locally called the Vichol Region. It is famous for Dargah Allahabad Jalsa. The city population is approximately 45,000.

The town is situated on the earthen heap or Darro, to safeguard the town from the waters of Indus (Mehran River passing north-west) and Nasrat Wah (Sada Wah, the then inundation canal, now Bhaddo).

== Demographics ==
Census	Population
1972	9,365
1981	12,355
1998	21,957
2017	38,869
2023	44,382

== History ==
According to tradition, Kandiaro was founded during the reign of the Mughal emperor Jahangir, after a nearby town called Patoipur was hit by a flood. Kandiaro was then built on higher ground, to protect against flooding, and its name came from the many kandi trees growing on the site.

Kandiaro was formally established as a municipality in February 1861. As of 1874, its population was 2,558. Most of its population was employed in agriculture, although there was also some trade in grain and cloth, and local cloth and paper industries.
