= Kahan Ho Tum (TV series) =

Television series

- Written by: Sabika Zainab
- Directed by: Zulfiqar Haider
- Starring: Sumbul Iqbal; Affan Waheed; Erum Akhtar; Faisal Rehman
- Country of origin: Pakistan
- Original language: Urdu
- No. of episodes: 25

Production
- Producer: Zulfiqar Haider
- Production location: Lahore, Punjab
- Running time: Approx 40 Minutes

Original release
- Network: A-Plus TV
- Release: 5 January – 22 June 2018

Kahan Ho Tum is 2018 a Pakistani television serial directed and produced by Zulfiqar Haider and written by Sabika Zainab.The drama featured Affan Waheed, Faisal Rehman and Sumbul Iqbal in lead roles. Set in the Walled City of Lahore, the series revolves around the cruel behaviour of society faced by a girl who doesn't involve in the activities of Kotha but only lives there.

== Plot ==
Noor, a young and pretty girl, lives with her mother, Salma Jahan, in the red-light district. Salma Jahan wants to shield Noor from the ills of her neighbourhood and send her to study at the university. Salma has told Noor that her father is no more, but in reality, Noor's father, Wali Khan, a well-to-do businessman, had left tawaif Salma. Salma's sister Sitara Jahan is the kotha madam. On Noor's first day at the university, she bumps into Zaviyar Khan and learns he is her classmate. Bushra, Zaviyar's cousin (Wali Khan's daughter and Baba Jaan's granddaughter), wants to marry Zaviyar. Murad Khan (Zaviyar's elder brother) gets attracted to Noor when he visits Chanda at the kotha. Salma slaps him when he tries to force himself on Noor. Later, Murad vows to take revenge.

Zaviyar gets hit by a bullet when he tries to save Noor and Sawal from being abducted by goons. Chanda is in love with Murad, so she is upset that Murad is now obsessed with Noor. Noor and Salma visit Zaviyar in the hospital. Wali Khan and Murad also visit the hospital after learning about Zaviyar's injury. Murad wonders whether Zaviyar was attacked by the goons he had sent to kidnap Noor. Wali and Salma bump into each other at the hospital. Wali tells her that he has been trying to find her for many years. Salma runs away when Baba Jaan arrives there.

Wali Khan visits the kotha to meet Salma. Bushra visits Zaviyar and tells him that the elders are considering fixing their marriage. With Sawal's help, Noor manages to escape from the kotha. She arrives at Wali Khan's house with a letter from her mother for Wali Khan. Upon reading Salma's letter, Wali Khan welcomes Noor home but lies to Nida and Baba Jaan that Noor is his friend's daughter and has come to stay with them as she has lost her parents. Nida is upset with Noor's arrival and suspects something fishy. Baba Jaan also suspects Wali lying, but Wali manages to convince him. Later, Nida and Bushra mistreat Noor.

Baba Jaan is impressed by Noor's modesty and politeness and warms up to her. Later, Baba Jaan decides to get Zaviyar married to Noor. Noor gets ready for her Nikah with Zaviyar. As the Nikah draws closer, Nida's anger increases, and she tells Wali that she will never forgive him for doing this to her and her daughter. Meanwhile, with Bushra's help, Murad hides in Noor's room and kidnaps her. He brings her to a secluded place. At the Nikah, everyone is shocked when Noor is not found anywhere.

When a distraught Zaviyar locks himself in a room and refuses to come out, Murad threatens to shoot himself. A heartbroken Noor returns to the brothel and faints. Zaviyar and Bushra get married.

Zaviyar accidentally overhears Bushra and Murad's conversation, where Murad confesses to Bushra that he kidnapped Noor because he wanted to have Noor and not to help Bushra. Zaviyar then divorces Bushra. She returns to her parents and confesses her involvement in separating Zaviyar and Noor. Noor and Ubaid marry at the kotha, but Murad arrives with a gun and threatens to kill Ubaid. However, Wali Khan shoots Murad before he can do any damage.

== Cast ==
- Sumbal Iqbal as Noor Jahan; Salma Jahan's daughter, born and raised in Kotha
- Affan Waheed as Zaviyar Ali; Noor's classfellow who wants to marry her
- Faisal Rehman as Ubaid
- Shaista Jabeen as Salma Jahan; Noor's mother who wants to stay her daughter away from the illness of society
- Munazzah Arif as Sitara Jahan; Salma Jahan's sister, mother of Chanda and Patriarch of the Kotha
- Erum Akhtar as Chand Begum "Chanda"; Sitara Jahan's daughter and a reputed tawaif
- Jahanzaib Ghorchani as Wali Khan; Noor's father and Salma Jaha's husband who left her before Noor's birth
- Abid Ali as Sultan Khan; Wali Khan's father and an influential landlord
- Taifoor Khan as Murad Ali Khan; Zaviyar's elder brother who often visits Chanda
- Mohsin Ali as Sanwal; Noor's friend
- Yashma Gill as Bushra; Wali Khan's daughter from his second wife and wants to marry Zaviyar
- Farah Tufail as Murad Ali Khan's wife; humble in nature and often abused by her husband
- Maryum Shafi as Bushra's mother and Wali Khan's second wife
- Hassan Mir as Doctor

== Soundtrack ==
The title song was sung by Beena Khan The music was composed by Raheel Fayyaz and the lyrics were penned by Behzad Lakhnavi

Kahan Ho Tum OST

Soundtrack album by Beena Khan
- Released: 25 December 2017
- Recorded: 2018
- Genre: Television soundtrack
- Length: (2:06)
- Language: Urdu
- Label: A-Plus TV

Music video
- "Kahan Ho Tum" OST on YouTube
