= Shikwa =

Pakistani television series

- Title screen
- Genre: Drama Serial; Romance
- Written by: Sarwat Nazir
- Directed by: Rubina Ashraf
- Starring: Waseem Abbas; Soniya Hussain; Humaira Ali; Badar Khalil; Sabahat Ali Bukhari
- Country of origin: Pakistan
- Original language: Urdu
- No. of episodes: 27

Production
- Producers: Humayun Saeed; Shehzad Nasib
- Running time: 45 Minutes
- Production company: Six Sigma Plus

Original release
- Network: ARY Digital
- Release: 3 May – 8 November 2014

Shikwa (Urdu: شکوہ, lit. 'Complaint') is a 2014 Pakistani television series that was first aired on ARY Digital. It is directed by Rubina Ashraf and written by Sarwat Nazir. It is produced by Humayun Saeed and Shahzad Nasib under Six Sigma Plus.

== Synopsis ==
Munazza takes charge as the caretaker of the house after the demise of her husband, Naveed. She concerned about her young daughters, Meher and Sidra, decides to get Meher married to her cousin Saqib, who is much older than Meher. Meher initially disapproves of the proposal but then suppresses her feelings against her mother's firm decision. This becomes the biggest regret of Meher's life as her life partner is twice her age.

== Cast ==
- Waseem Abbas as Saqib
- Soniya Hussain as Meher Saqib
- Irsa Ghazal as Munazza
- Asad Siddiqui
- Gohar Rasheed
- Sabahat Ali Bukhari as Zeba
- Badar Khalil as Maimona
- Humaira Ali as Tamanna Khanam
- Qaiser Naqvi as Saqib's Aapa
- Alizeh Tahir as Sidra
- Javed Sheikh as Naveed
- Emmad Irfani
- Sami Sani

== Accolades ==
=== Nominations ===
- Lux Style Awards - Best Television Series - Shikwa
- Lux Style Awards - Best Television Director - Rubina Ashraf
