= Kashkol (TV series) =

Pakistani television series

- Title screen
- Genre: Television Serial Drama
- Written by: Hameed Kashmiri
- Starring: Talat Hussain; Sajjad Hasan; Aijaz Aslam; Tauqeer Nasir; Hassam Qazi; Tahira Wasti; Rizwan Wasti; Jahanara Hai; Shagufta Ejaz; Shabbir Jan; Seemi Zaidi; Malik Anokha
- Country of origin: Pakistan
- Original language: Urdu

Original release
- Network: NTM
- Release: 1993

Kashkol (Urdu: کشکول, lit. 'Begging bowl') is a Pakistani Urdu-language television series directed by Nusrat Shaheen which aired in 1993 on NTM.

== Credits ==
It starred Talat Hussain, Malik Anokha, Syed Kamal, Tahira Wasti and Aijaz Aslam. The term kashkol means a "beggar's bowl" and the television drama was based on a popular novel of the same name by Hameed Kashmiri.

== Cast ==
- Talat Hussain as Fazal Jah
- Tahira Wasti as Salma
- Malik Anokha as Sheroo
- Kaiser Khan as Sohail
- Syed Kamal as Zubair
- Ghalib Kamal as Fahad
- Tauqeer Nasir as Mehmood
- Seemi Zaidi as Shaheena
- Rizwan Wasti as Secretary
- Hassam Qazi as S.S.P
- Aijaz Aslam as Roshoo
- Shagufta Ejaz as Azra
- Mahmood Ali as Master Ji
- Shabbir Jan as Jameel Ustad
- Jahanara Hai as Ms. Shah
- Tasmina Ahmed-Sheikh as Shehla
- Mehmood Akhtar as Aarsha
- Masooma Latif as Mrs. Durrani
- Maqsood Hasan as Chotoo

== See also ==
- Pakistan Television
- Network Television Marketing
