= Vichol =

Linguistic and Geographical Region of Sindh

Vichol وچولو (Sindhi)
- Region
- Country: Pakistan
- Province: Sindh

Languages
  - Main language: Sindhi
- Time zone: UTC+5 (PST)

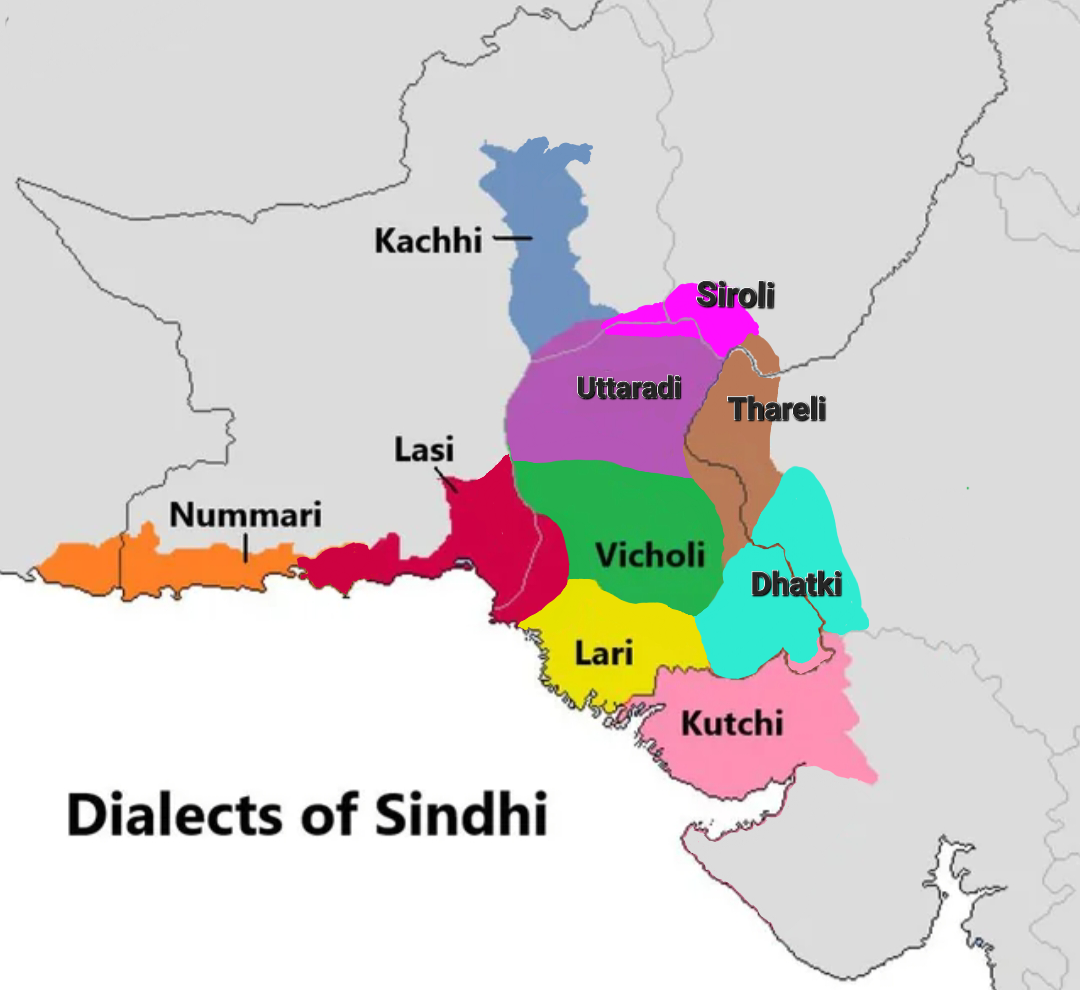
Map of Sindhi dialects and regions, With Vicholi referring to Vichol.

Vichol (Sindhi: وچولو) also known as Vicholo is a geographical and linguistic region in Sindh comprising all of central Sindh. It stretches from Kandiaro of Naushahro Feroze District till Kotri at the end of Hyderabad District. the districts of Nawabshah, half of Naushahro Feroze District, Matiari District, parts of Sanghar District and the entirety of the Hyderabad District.

== Etymology ==
The term Vichol derives from a Sindhi word "Vicho/Vichu" (Sindhi: وِچُ) meaning the middle or centre.

== Dialect ==
The dialect of Sindhi spoken in Vichol Region is Vicholi, it is regarded as the standard dialect of Sindhi and it is considered to be "Pure Sindhi".

== See also ==
- Hyderabad District, Sindh
- Nawabshah District
- Sindhi language
- Sindh
- Matiari District
- Kotri
