= Marvi =

Television series

- Title screen
- Genre: Drama (Television)
- Written by: Noor ul Huda Shah
- Directed by: Sultana Siddiqui
- Starring: Hassam Qazi; Ghazal Siddique; Mahnoor Baloch; Roshan Atta; Anwar Solangi
- Country of origin: Pakistan
- Original language: Urdu

Original release
- Network: Pakistan Television Corporation
- Release: 1993 – 1993

Marvi (Urdu: ماروی) is a Pakistani drama series broadcast on Pakistan Television Corporation (PTV) in 1993.

It was a modern version of the Sindhi folktale, "Umar Marvi". It starred Ghazal Siddique as Marvi and Hassam Qazi as Umar. It was adapted by Noorul Huda Shah and directed by Sultana Siddiqui. Mahnoor Baloch debuted in the series in a supporting role. The series aired during Benazir Bhutto's second term as Prime Minister of Pakistan.

== Plot summary ==
The story is about a village girl named Marvi who goes to the city to study, with the aim to come back to her village and improve the living conditions for the people there. Things do not go according to plan, and she faces many hardships. Marvi's possessive lover, Umar, played by Hassam Qazi, becomes so obsessed with her that he changes into a different person. He asks his friend Akbar, a feudal lord, for help. Akbar kidnaps Marvi without Umar's knowledge. When Umar finds out, he becomes very angry at Akbar, but later, after Akbar threatens to kill Marvi, Umar becomes a silent spectator. When Marvi pleads for help, Umar helps her escape. With the help of feudal lords, villagers and police try to kill Marvi for having a bad character. Marvi escapes and goes to her female boss, for whom she worked as an editor. She helps Marvi file a petition against Umar and Akbar for killing her cousin. When the case is about to be decided in favor of the feudal lords, leaving Marvi as the culprit, Umar confesses that he is in love with Marvi and helped in her kidnapping. He says at the end that he loves Marvi.

== Cast ==
- Ghazal Siddique as Marvi
- Hassam Qazi as Umar, Laila's brother who returns home from studying abroad and falls in love with Marvi.
- Mahnoor Baloch as Laila, Marvi's roommate and friend. Umar's younger sister.
- Badar Khalil as Mehru, Umar and Laila's mother
- Kaiser Khan Nizamani as Akbar Ali, Laila's fiancé and cousin.
- Mahmood Siddiqui as Umar and Laila's father, a politician and landlord.
- Noor Muhammad Lashari as Marvi's father, the village school teacher.
- Manzoor Murad as Kheth, Marvi's cousin and fiancé.
- Roshan Atta as Marvi's mother
- Anwar Solangi as Ashiq Ali Khan, Akbar Ali's father. Umar and Laila's paternal uncle (phopha). Landlord of Marvi's village.
- Asad Qureshi as Phog
- Sheema Kermani as Safia Begum. The editor of the Roshni newspaper.
- Anwar Baloch as Ali Nawaz's servant

== Production ==
Sultana Siddiqui directed Sindhi play Marvi, which was written by Noorul Huda Shah and starred Sakina Samo as Marvi. The commercial success of the series motivated Siddiqui to adapt the series in Urdu.
