= Shagufta Ejaz =

Pakistani actress

Shagufta Ejaz شگفتہ اعجاز
- Born: 1960 (age 65–66); Gujrat, Punjab, Pakistan
- Occupation: Actress
- Years active: 1980–present

Shagufta Ejaz (Urdu: شگفتہ اعجاز; born 5 May 1960) is a Pakistani actress, working in the Urdu dramas and film industry. She rose to prominence with her roles in PTV Home's classic serials in the 1980s and 1990s such as Jangloos and Aanch. She is considered among the finest actors in Pakistan. She also appeared in a few Punjabi films.

== Early life ==
Ejaz was born in 1970 in Gujrat, Punjab. She got her earlier educationa from there.

Before making a career in acting, she worked as a air hostess for an International airline. She was married to Yahya Siddiqui as her second marriage, who died in September 2024.

In 2013, she found the beauty salon, Envy by Shagufta Ejaz in Karachi. In 2022, Ejaz was one of the show-stoppers in the Mehndi segment during Kashee's Beauty Salon's 'Bridal Festive 2022', a Karachi-based salon owned by Kashif Aslam.

In late 2025, Ejaz lost a considerable amount of weight, leading to a marked transformation in her appearance, and many claimed that she used Ozempic, however she strongly denied these claims.

== Career ==
She started her career in the showbiz industry in the late 1980s, making her debut with feudal-dramaJangloos in 1989, after director Kazim Pasha selected her for the role. She played the lead role in the drama Aanch in 1992, and since then the portrayal has become amongst her signature works. In 2001, Ejaz appeared in drama Ainee, playing the resilient Ainee who fights family greed and deceit. In 2013, she won the Best Supporting Actress for her role in the romance Meray Qatil Meray Dildar at the Hum Awards. In 2026, Ejaz appeared as the supporting aunt of protagonist in the drama Bas Tera Saath Ho.

== Filmography ==
=== Film ===
Year	Title	Role	Language
1981	Chan Varyam		Punjabi
1991	Kalay Chor	Sher Jang's sister	Urdu
1986	Malanga	Banoo	Punjabi
1983	Des Pardes		Punjabi
1986	Qaidi		Punjabi
1984	Sajawal Daku		Punjabi

=== Television ===
Year	Title	Role	Notes
1989	Jangloos	Jamila	
1993	Kashkol	Azra	
1994	Angar Wadi	Usha	
1995	Kati Patang		
1996	Pyari Shammo		
1999	Gharib e shehr		
2000	Aansoo	Sadia	
2000	Ab Yeh Mumkin Nahi	Samra	
2001	The Castle: Aik Umeed	Jasmine	
2001	Hawa Pe Raqs		
2001	Khala Kulsum Ka Kumba		
2001	Ainee	Ainee	
2004–2005	Hum Se Juda Na Hona		
2005	Baiti		
2005	Dil Se Dil Tak	Faiza	
2006	Makan		
2006	Thora Saath Chahiye		
2009	Veena	Sajida	
2010: 2025-present	Bulbulay	Hajra Aapa	
2011	Zindagi Dhoop Tum Ghana Saya	Rizwana	
2011	Roag	Humaira	
2011	Dugdugi	Shagufta	
2011	Mera Naseeb		
2011	Main Akeli Reh Gai	Shehwar	
2011–2012	Aye Dasht e Junoon		
2011–2012	Meray Qatil Meray Dildar	Durdana Phupho	
2012	Sasural Ke Rang Anokhay		
2014–2015	Darbadar Tere Liye	Aapa/Begum	
2015	Sartaj Mera Tu Raaj Mera		
2017	Hari Hari Churiyaan	Surraya; Aiman's mother	
2017	Zindaan	Meher Bano	
2017	Bewaqoofian		
2018	Silsilay	Tanzila	
2018	Mere Bewafa	Safia	
2018–2019	Khafa Khafa Zindagi	Sara's mother	
2018–2020	Jalebi	Haris's mother	
2018–2020	Ghar Jamai	Warda's mother	
2019	Yaariyan	Zeenat	
2019	Rishtay Bikte Hain	Farhat	
2019	Mujhe Beta Chahiye	Shareefan	
2021	Bebasi	Ishrat Jahan	
2021	Ek Jhoota Lafz Mohabbat		
2022	Chaudhry and Sons	Dr. Salma	
2022	Mushkil	Faraz's Mother	
2022–23	Wabaal	Shagufta	
2026	Bas Tera Saath Ho		

== Awards and nominations ==
Year	Title	Award	Category	Result	Ref.
2013	Mere Qatil Mere Dildar	Hum Awards	Best Supporting Actress	Won	
