= Kaiser Khan Nizamani =

Pakistani actor

Kaiser Khan Nizamani قیصر خان نظامانی
- Born: 9 August 1966 (age 59); Hyderabad, Sindh, Pakistan
- Occupations: Actor; Director; Producer; Lawyer
- Years active: 1989–present
- Spouse: Fazila Qazi
- Awards: Pride of Performance (2018)

Kaiser Khan Nizamani is a Pakistani actor, director, and producer who initially worked primarily in Sindhi-language television dramas, particularly for Pakistan Television (PTV). Active on television since the 1990s, he has appeared in both leading and supporting roles. He is the recipient of Pakistan's civil award the Presidential Pride of Performance.

== Early and personal life ==
Born in Hyderabad, Sindh, Khan completed his early education at St. Peter’s High School in Karachi, Pakistan. He went on to pursue higher education at S.M. Science College, Karachi, where he earned a bachelor’s degree in Liberal Arts and Sciences/Liberal Studies.

Khan married fellow actress Fazila Qazi in 1993. The couple has two sons.

== Acting career ==
Khan rose to fame in the 1990s. Besides acting in Sindhi television series, he also appeared in PTV television series such as Marvi and Hawain. He made his film debut in 2013 with mystery-thriller Josh: Independence Through Unity. Some of his other television appearances include Alif Allah Aur Insaan, Laapata and Bakhtawar.

== Legal career ==
In addition to his work in television, Khan is also a practising lawyer, working at the Karachi High Court and the Karachi Bar Court. In April 2024, actor Faysal Quraishi publicly acknowledged Nizamani’s role in reaching out to him regarding a legal notice issued in response to the television drama Zulm.

== Selected filmography ==
=== Television series ===
Year	Title	Role	Director	Producer	Network
1989	Tapish	Bilal			PTV
1991	Sassi Punnu	Sassi			PTV
1993	Marvi	Akbar Ali			PTV
1993	Kashkol	Sohail			NTM
1993	Agar	Faraz			PTV
1993	Babar	Meer Fazil			PTV
1994	Aitbar	Aitbar			PTV
1995	Aik Thi Mehroo	Yaseen			PTV
1995	Arzoo	No	Yes	Yes	PTV
1997	Hawain	Raees Suleman			PTV
1997	Yeh Zindagi	Seerat			PTV
1998	Dararain	Sikandar Ali Khan			PTV
2000	Suraj Girhan	Shah Ji			PTV
2002	Tum Hi To Ho	Shoaib			PTV
2004	Naseeb	Nasir			PTV
2005	Jaise Jante Nahin	Hamid			PTV
2006	Makan	Azam			Geo Entertainment
2012	Roshan Sitara	Hakim Ali			Hum TV
2017	Alif Allah Aur Insaan	Zimmi's father			Hum TV
2021	Yun Tu Hai Pyar Bohut	Advocate			Hum TV
2021	Laapata	Karim			Hum TV
2022	Bakhtawar	Malik Sher Zaman			Hum TV
2025	Shikanja	Saeed			Geo Entertainment

=== Films ===
Year	Title	Role	Notes
2013	Josh: Independence Through Unity	Khan	
