= Sumbul Iqbal =

Pakistani actress (born 1985)

- سنبل اقبال
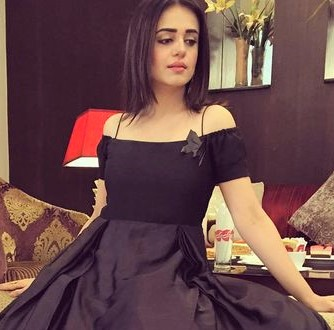
- Born: Sumbul Iqbal; 30 August 1985 (age 40); Karachi
- Occupations: Actress, Model
- Years active: 2010–present

Sumbul Iqbal (Urdu: سنبل اقبال) is a Pakistani television actress. She is best known for her leading roles in Meray Khwab Raiza Raiza (2011), Kis Din Mera Viyah Howay Ga 2 (2012), Raju Rocket (2012), Rukhsaar (2013), Aik Pal (2014), Tumsay Mil Kay (2015), and Aik Thi Rania (2017). Iqbal was last seen as an antagonist in ARY Digital's Mein Hari Piya (2021).

== Life and career ==
Sumbul Iqbal was born in Karachi. She is noted for playing a variety of characters in dramas, including ARY Digital's series Roag (2011), which was critically successful. She later appeared in Hum TV's Mere Khwab Raiza Raiza (2012) opposite Syed Jibran.

== Filmography ==
=== Television ===
Year	Title	Role	Notes
2010	Hawa Rait Aur Aangan	Fiza	
2011	Buri Aurat	Aleena	
2011	Dil e Abad	Rubi	
2011	Roag	Nimra	
2011	Meray Khwab Raiza Raiza	Zainab	
2011	My Dear Sautan	Tehzeeb	
2011	Sabz Qadam	Momina	
2011	Kis Din Mera Viyah Howay Ga 2	Naik Parveen (Pari)	
2012	Kachra Kundi		
2012	Kitni Girhain Baaki Hain		Episode 10
2012	Raju Rocket	Hina	Hum Award for Best Soap Actress
2013	Teri Berukhi		
2013	Rukhsaar	Rukhsaar	
2013	Shareek-e-Hayat	Hina	Anthology series
2013	Shab e Zindagi	Mariyam	
2013	Rasam	Amber	
2013	Janey Kyun	Hania	
2014	Aik Pal	Noor Fatima	
2015	Mere Khuda	Tania	
2015	Tumse Mil Kay	Zill-e-Huma	
2015	Neelam Kinaray	Laraib	
2016	Maazi	Tooba	
2016	Ghayal	Tooba	
2016	Parizad	Parizad	
2017	Aik Thi Rania	Rania	
2018	Kahan Ho Tum	Noor	
2018	Khafa Khafa Zindagi	Sara Bilal	
2019	Jaal	Esha Jameel	
2019	Barfi Laddu	Barfi Laddu	
2020	Tum Ho Wajah	Chanda	
2020	Dulhan	Amal	
2021	Mein Hari Piya	Farwa	
2022	Ilzaam	Ayeza	
2023	Abdullah	Naila	

=== Films ===
Year	Title	Role	Notes
2017	Nawab Sahab Ki Naubahar		
2018	Doli Saja Ke Rakhna		
2018	Doosri Aurat	Shanila	
2021	Bhoot Bangla		

== Awards and nominations ==
Year	Work	Award	Category	Result
2013	Raju Rocket	Hum Awards	Best Actress Soap	Won
