= Aban Zafar =

- The opening title screen for Aban Zafar
- Written by: Muhammad Ahmed
- Directed by: Erum Binte Shahid
- Starring: Faisal Rehman; Sania Saeed; Rubina Ashraf; Naveed Jaffri; Muhammad Ahmed (voice only); Imran Abbas (voice only)

Production
- Production location: Astore District, Pakistan
- Running time: 32–33 minutes

Original release
- Network: Ary Digital
- Release: 2 October 2008

Aban Zafar is a Pakistani telefilm which was aired on the occasion of Eid in 2008 on Ary Digital. The telefilm is written by Muhammad Ahmed and directed by Erum Binte Shahid. Main cast include Faisal Rehman and Sania Saeed.

== Cast and characters ==
- Sania Saeed portrays Aban, who goes to visit her parents cottage house. Aban's parents live abroad and she has lost contact with them. It's been six years since her husband died leaving behind his pregnant wife alone in Karachi.
- Faisal Rehman portrays Zafar Mehmood, who is a police officer and looks after 8 orphaned children. Zafar couldn't marry his girl friend because she didn't want to have kids, whereas Zafar loved kids so much that he could happily make his home an orphanage for kids.
- Naveed Jaffri plays a junior police officer who sells insurance as a part-time job, and keeps bugging Aban to buy one for herself.
- Rubina Ashraf had made a special appearance as Aban's mother and Muhammad Ahmed has done a voice role as Aban's dad.

== Plot ==
Aban (Sania Saeed) goes to find solace in the cottage house which her parents owned in Astore District. They have cut all ties with her for something that happened in the past and that house is the only place where she could feel their presence. Aban unexpectedly meets Zafar (Faisal Rehman) whilst standing near the edge of a hill. He thinks she is trying to commit suicide and jumps at her with a shawl, dragging her away from the 'suicidal spot'. Aban thinks he's a mental man but her views are soon changed for good, when she sees that Zafar is actually a very caring person who looks after 8 orphaned children. One day Zafar calls Aban to come at his place and meet the kids only to make her realise that one of the kids, the only girl in the group, Samira, is battling with a life-threatening heart disease and she had lost both her parents to the 2005 Pakistan earthquake but still she manages to smile and that life goes on and we keep moving from one point to the next.
