= Teri Berukhi =

Pakistani television drama

== Summary ==
Teri Berukhi
- Genre: Family drama Romantic drama
- Written by: Seema Munaf
- Directed by: Mohsin Mirza
- Starring: Shahood Alvi; Savera Nadeem; Sukaina Khan; Sumbul Iqbal
- Country of origin: Pakistan
- Original language: Urdu
- No. of episodes: 21

Production
- Producer: A&B Entertainment
- Production location: Pakistan
- Running time: Approx. 40 minutes

Original release
- Network: Geo Entertainment
- Release: 19 April – 13 September 2013

Teri Berukhi is a 2013 Pakistani television drama serial directed by Mohsin Mirza, produced by A&B Entertainment and written by Seema Munaf. It stars Shahood Alvi, Savera Nadeem and Sumbul Iqbal in the lead roles. The serial premiered on 19 April 2013 on Geo Entertainment, airing on Fridays at 8:00 pm. It was later broadcast in India on Zindagi under the same title.

== Plot ==
Numair, a wealthy industrialist, is married to his second wife, Shahtaj. He has two children, Anusha and Areeb, from his first marriage to Alina. Numair finds his second marriage fulfilling, regarding Shahtaj as more even-tempered than Alina, a perception that fuels Alina's resentment toward her. Anusha and Areeb are initially hostile toward Shahtaj, though she continues to treat them as her own. Over time, the children grow fond of her and come to regard her as a second mother, to Numair's satisfaction and Alina's dismay. Determined to reclaim her former husband, Alina presses Numair to divorce Shahtaj and remarry her, eventually succeeding—an outcome that brings turmoil to all those involved.

== Cast ==
- Sumbul Iqbal
- Shahood Alvi
- Savera Nadeem
- Sukaina Khan
- Seemi Pasha
- Shehryar Zaidi
- Ismat Zaidi
- Benita David
- Umair Laghari
- Mehak Ali
- Fahmeed Ahmed

== Awards and nominations ==
Year	Award	Category	Recipient(s)	Result
11 January 2014	Pakistan Media Awards	Best Supporting Actress	Savera Nadeem	Nominated
