= Sakhi Hassan Graveyard =

Cemetery in Karachi

- سخی حسن قبرستان
- Interactive map of Sakhi Hassan Graveyard

Details
- Location: Sakhi Hassan, Karachi
- Country: Pakistan
- Coordinates: 24°57′32″N 67°3′15″E
- Owned by: Karachi Metropolitan Corporation

Sakhi Hassan Graveyard is a cemetery located in Sakhi Hassan, northern Karachi, Pakistan. The Karachi Metropolitan Corporation oversees the management and administration of the graveyard.

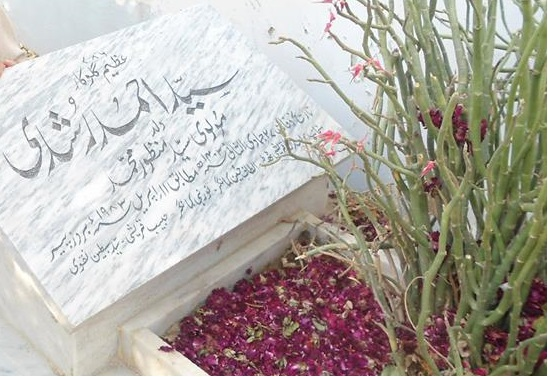
Grave of playback singer Ahmed Rushdi

The tree-covered graveyard stretches from northwest to southeast between Sakhi Hassan Street and Shahjahan Avenue, with Shahrah Noor Jahan bordering its northern flank.

In 2003, the administration banned burials in the graveyard due to a lack of space. Some gravediggers, without approval from the relevant union council, had begun dismantling old graves to create new ones.

In 2016, paramilitary rangers and intelligence agencies carried out a search operation at the graveyard, uncovering a substantial cache of hidden weapons.

In 2019, heavy rains caused sewage water to flood the graveyard after a nearby nullah, already clogged with garbage, overflowed. The flooding affected approximately 50,000 graves, prompting protests from local residents.

In 2025, with burial space scarce in Karachi, illegal payments became common. Police arrested a gravedigger at Sakhi Hassan Graveyard for charging four times the official rate.

== Notable burials ==
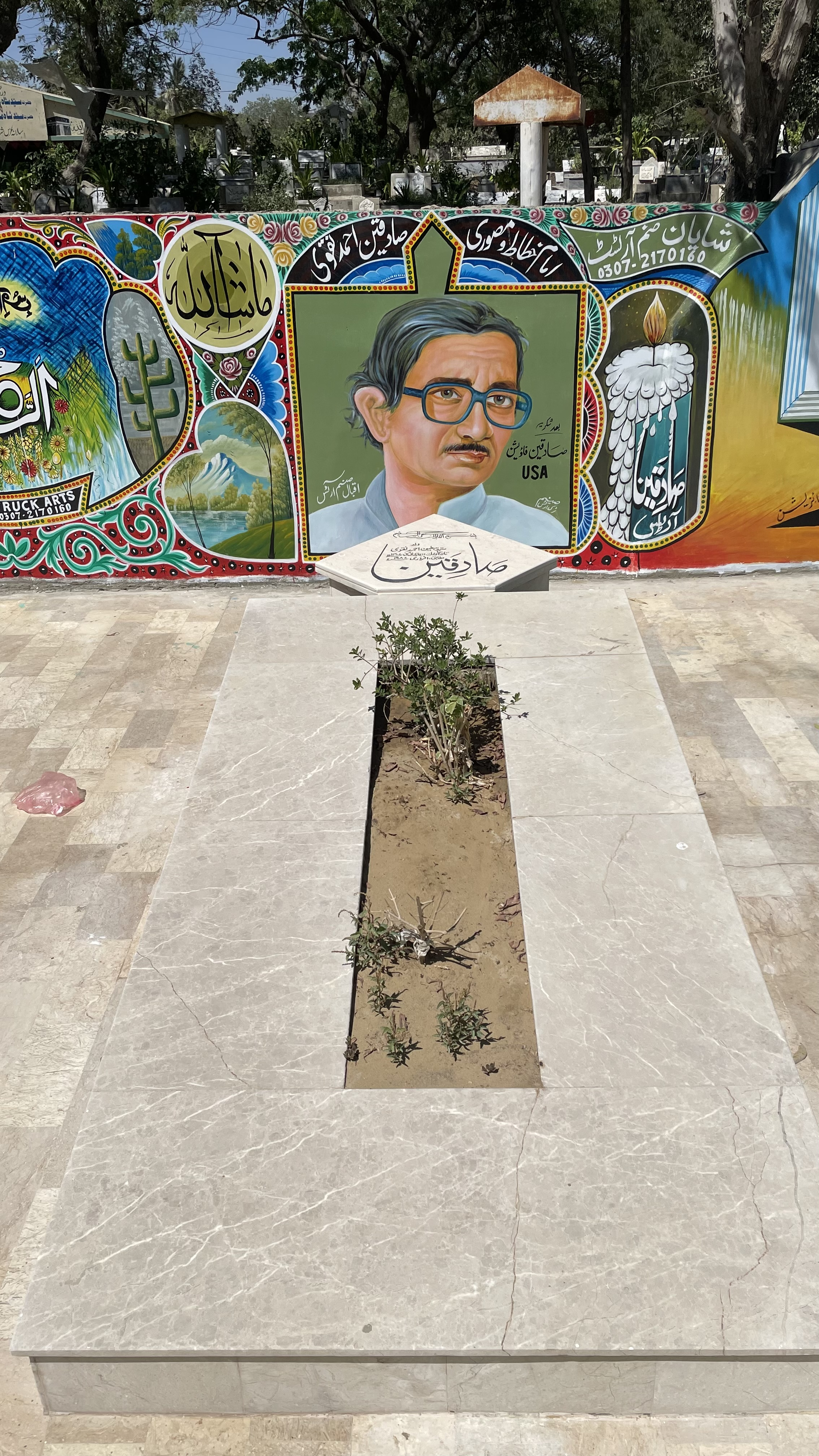
Grave of artist Sadequain

- Ahmed Rushdi (1934–1983), Playback singer
- Sadequain (1930–1987), artist and poet
- Anwar Solangi (1944–2008), television and radio artist
- Khalida Riyasat (1953-1996), television and radio artist
- Syed Munawar Hasan, politician
- Mujeeb Alam (1948 - 2004), Playback singer
