= Pacca Ghanghra =

- Village
- Location in Pakistan
- Coordinates: 27°10′20″N 68°17′11″E
- Country: Pakistan
- Region: Sindh Province
- District: Naushahro Feroze
- Taluka: Kandiaro
- Union Council: Pacca Ghanghra

Government
- Time zone: UTC+5 (PST)

Pacca Ghanghra is a village in Kandiaro Taluka of Naushahro Feroze District, Sindh, Pakistan. It is the administrative headquarters of the Pacca Ghanghra Union Council.

== The list of villages in Khan Wahan Union Council ==
1. Bazid Pur
2. Soomar Channar
