= Dil Dhoondta Hai Phir Wohi =

2025 Pakistani television series

- Genre: Romantic drama
- Written by: Rida Bilal
- Directed by: Adnan Sarwar
- Starring: Zahid Ahmed; Zara Noor Abbas
- Country of origin: Pakistan
- Original language: Urdu

Production
- Producer: Asad Siddiqui
- Production company: Alpha Productions

Original release
- Network: Express Entertainment
- Release: 1 October 2025

Dil Dhoondta Hai Phir Wohi is a Pakistani romantic drama television series directed by Adnan Sarwar and written by Rida Bilal. Produced by Alpha Productions, the series stars Zahid Ahmed and Zara Noor Abbas in lead roles. It premiered on Express Entertainment on 1 October 2025.

== Plot ==
The series follows Ali and Ramsha, a couple whose relationship faces a major challenge after Ali is diagnosed with early-onset dementia. As his condition affects his memory, Ramsha struggles to preserve their relationship and the emotional connection they have built together. The story explores the effects of memory loss on romantic relationships and family life.

== Cast ==
- Zahid Ahmed as Ali
- Zara Noor Abbas as Ramsha
- Rubina Ashraf
- Faizan Shaikh
- Mohammad Ahmed
- Naureen Gulwani
- Shaista Jabeen
- Mahenur Haider
- Samia Butt
- Ikram Abbasi

== Production ==
The series was developed by Alpha Productions, a production company founded by actor Asad Siddiqui. Rida Bilal wrote the screenplay, while Adnan Sarwar directed the project. The drama focuses on frontotemporal dementia, a condition that affects behaviour, personality and language, and brings the subject into a Pakistani television narrative. Zahid Ahmed took on the role of a man living with the condition.

== Broadcast ==
Dil Dhoondta Hai Phir Wohi premiered on Express Entertainment on 1 October 2025. It was broadcast on Wednesdays and Thursdays at 8:00 pm.

== Reception ==
A reviewer from The News International found the story promising, praised the direction, performances of Zahid Ahmed and Zara Noor Abbas but noted the child actor's performance "a little overboard in a few scenes".
