= Noorul Huda Shah =

Pakistani TV playwright

Noorul Huda Shah is a Pakistani dramatist, short story writer, poet and columnist. She served as the Information Minister during the caretaker government in Sindh ahead of the 2013 elections.

Shah writes in both Sindhi and Urdu. She is best known for writing popular TV serials like Jungle, Marvi, Faaslay and Tapish.

== Career ==
Noorul Huda completed her education from Sindh University and then started a career at Pakistan Television Corporation (PTV). Her first play, Jungle, aired on PTV in 1983. The series, set against a Sindhi backdrop, revolves around the feudalism in the region. Later, she joined Geo as a soap producer and then became a script writer for Hum TV. She was appointed CEO of A-Plus television. Afterwards, she started working for Hum Sitaray. In 2017, she joined Bol Network. Shah has written numerous short stories, some of which have been compiled in a collection called Jala Watan (lit. "Exiled"). Presently, Shah writes a column for an online news forum called HumSub.

Shah served as the provincial Information Minister during the caretaker government in Sindh in 2013. She is known in Pakistan for promoting women empowerment and feminism under the funding and her collaboration with the Johns Hopkins University in the United States.

== List of TV dramas ==
- Jungle (1983)
- Asmaan Tak Deewar
- Tapish
- Marvi (Sindhi)
- Marvi
- Ab Mera Intazaar Kar
- Zara Si Aurat
- Ajnabi Raaste
- Thodi Si Mohabbat
- Bebak
- Hawa Ki Beti
- Na Junoon Raha Na Pari Rahi
- Meri Adhuri Moahabat
- Ajayb Ghar
- Ishq Gumshuda
- Badlon Pay Basera
- Aman aur Pichu
- Chand Khatoot Chand Tasveerein
- Sammi
- Adhura Milan (2014)
- Faaslay
- Man-o-Salwa (GEO TV) (2007)
- Aun Zara (2013)

== Awards ==
- President's Award for Pride of Performance (2008)
