= Atta Shad =

Pakistani playwright and poet (1939–1997

Atta Shad PP عطا شاد
- Born: Mohammad Ishaq; 1 November 1939; Singani Sar, Kech, Balochistan, British India (present-day Balochistan, Pakistan)
- Died: 13 February 1997 (aged 57); Quetta, Balochistan, Pakistan
- Occupations: Poet and Literary Critic
- Writing career
- Language: Balochi; Urdu; English; Persian
- Genres: Ghazal; Nazm
- Notable works: Rochgir - روچ گر; Shap Sahar Andeem - شپ سہار اندیم; Barpaag - برپاگ
- Notable awards: Presidential Pride of Performance Award 1983; Fellowship: International Training Institute Sydney, Australia
- Movements: Modernist poetry; Romantic poetry

Mohammad Ishaq PP, popularly known as Atta Shad (Balochi, Urdu: عطا شاد; 1 November 1939 – 13 February 1997), was a Pakistani poet, critic, playwright, researcher and intellectual. He wrote poems in Urdu and later in Balochi language. Shad is considered the originator of modern symbolic Balochi poetry. He was awarded the Presidential Pride of Performance in 1983, by the Government of Pakistan.

== Career ==
His unique style gave him a prominent place in the literary quarters . His first free verse poem, named "Shepaank" (شپانک), was published in Ols Magazine. Atta attracted widespread attention for his poem "Sah Kandan" (ساہ کندن) which represented the true sense of Baloch tradition and history. "In a broader sense, Atta truly served as a bridge between Urdu poetry and Balochi culture."

== Early life ==
Atta Shad was born in Singani Sar, Kech District, near Turbat in November 1939. He served in several government positions as Information Officer, Director General and Secretary Information.

== Literary contribution ==
=== Urdu poetry ===
During his lifetime, Atta published two collections of Urdu poetry. Atta's Urdu poetry is a true reflection of Balochi culture and landscape of Balochistan. He added a new poetic flavour to Urdu poetry by versifying certain Balochi folk lore, romantic sagas and maxims.

He wrote poems like "Mahnaaz", "Shah Mureed aur Haani", "Wafa" and "Lori". They represent different aspects of Balochi culture and talk about the psyche of the typical Baloch society. His short poem "Wafa" (Oath of Allegiance) reads as: "On my motherland A bowel of water Worth eternal allegiance Let us quench our thirst And Submit ourselves to the eternal bond."

=== Balochi poetry ===
During the time of Atta, Baloch poetry was divided into two major and often competing groups - Progressives and Purists. Atta Shad refused to join either group; he was neither convinced of bringing political change through poetry nor was he an advocate of purism. On the contrary, he conceived a poetic diction inclusive of words from all the dialects of Balochi, despite the fact that he was himself a speaker of the dominant Western Dialect. This new diction afforded him a wider spectrum for his intricate poetic expressions.

=== Death ===
He died on 13 February 1997 and was buried on 14 February in Kasi graveyard, Quetta . After his death, a major Pakistani newspaper said about him that Atta Shad used to raise his voice against all forms of social oppression and that Balochistan had been vulnerable to tribal oppression and dictatorship over the years.

== Awards and recognition ==
- Sitara-e-Imtiaz Award (Star of Excellence) by the President of Pakistan (1982)
- Pride of Performance Award by the President of Pakistan (1983)
