= Anwar Solangi =

Pakistani television and radio performer

- Born: Anwar Solangi; 1944; Shahdadpur, Sindh, Pakistan
- Died: 3 April 2008 (age 64); Civil Hospital, Karachi
- Other name: Anwar Solangi
- Occupations: Actor, producer, director and writer

Pride of Performance Award Recipient
- Date: 14-08-2010
- Country: Islamic Republic of Pakistan
- Presented by: Asif Ali Zardari

Anwar Solangi (1944–2008) was a Pakistani television and radio performer. He was born in Shahdadpur, in Sindh.

== Life ==
Solangi became an anchorperson at the Radio Pakistan's Hyderabad station during Zulfiqar Ali Bhutto’s government but was sacked by the subsequent Ziaul Haq regime. With about 500 plays in both Urdu and Sindhi languages to his credit, Solangi was twice awarded PTV Awards for best actor and best supporting actor.

He also acted in the Urdu film Khwahish, as well as in ten Sindhi-language films. Solangi wrote a book called Wateyoo Veh Gadroo ('Dishes of Poison'), which includes his collection of articles which were published in various newspapers, his poetry, and essays based on his personal life.

Solangi died after a long illness at the Civil Hospital, Karachi on 3 April 2008. He was 64, Anwar was buried at the Sakhi Hassan Graveyard. He was survived by his wife, two daughters and a son.

== Awards ==
- 2010: Pride of Performance

== Noted television plays ==
Year	Title	Role	Notes
	Dewarain		
	Chhoti Si Duniya		
1984	Jungle	Aarab	
1993	Marvi	Ashiq Ali Khan	
1995	Hawain	Qadir Bilji	
	Rani Jo Kahani		Sindhi serial
2000	Ab Yeh Mumkin Nahi	Sultan Shah	

== See also ==
- List of Lollywood actors
