= Noor Muhammad Lashari =

Pakistani male television actor

- Born: نور محمد لاشاري; 24 October 1931; Kot Lashari, Near Bhan Syedabad, Sindh, Pakistan
- Died: 1 February 1997 (aged 65); Karachi
- Occupations: Stage, Radio, TV and Film actor

Pride of Performance Award Recipient
- Date: 1992
- Country: Islamic Republic of Pakistan
- Presented by: Ghulam Ishaq Khan

Noor Muhammad Lashari ([Sindhi: نور محمد لاشاري], 24 October 1931 – 1 February 1997) was a Pakistani stage, radio, TV and film actor from Sindh. Widely regarded as one of the pioneering figures of Sindhi drama, he was known for his work in both Sindhi- and Urdu-language productions. In recognition of his contributions to the performing arts, he received the Pride of Performance Award from the Government of Pakistan in 1992.

== Early life ==
Noor Muhammad Lashari was born on 24 October 1931 at village Kot Lashari, near Bhan Syedabad, Jamshoro District. He was the only son of his parents. His father was Faiz Muhammad Lashari. After completing his schooling, he started his profession life as a primary school teacher.

== Acting career ==
Lashari began his acting career in local stage theatre. He joined the Ustad Bukhari Natak Mandli (Ustad Bukhari Drama Society), where he performed in numerous plays and gained recognition for his acting skills.

In 1960, he joined Radio Pakistan Hyderabad, initially working as a copyist before becoming a drama artist. His success in radio drama established him as a prominent performer in Sindh.

In 1967, Lashari moved to Karachi and began working in television. Over the following decades, he appeared in a large number of Sindhi- and Urdu-language plays and serials broadcast by Pakistan Television (PTV). Dungi Manjh Darya (Sindhi: دنگي منجھ درياءٌ), Miteea Ja Manhu (Sindhi:مٽيءَ جا ماڻھو) and Rani Ji Kahani (Sindhi: راڻيءَ جي ڪھاڻي) are among his hundreds of Sindhi language Pakistan Television (PTV) plays/serials.

He also played supporting roles in several Sindhi cinema-films and appeared in one Balochi film.

== Urdu TV plays/serials ==
Noor Muhammad Lashari performed in numerous TV plays/serials. Some of the popular Urdu language serials in which he acted are listed below.

- Badaltay Mausam (Urdu: .بدلتے موسم)
- Chand Grehan (Urdu: چاند گرہن)
- Chhoti Si Dunya (Urdu: چھوٹی سی دنیا )
- Dasht (Urdu: دشت)
- Deewaren (Urdu: دیواریں)
- Jungle (Urdu: جنگل)
- Khan Sahib (Urdu: خانصاحب)
- Marvi (Urdu: ماروی)

== Sindhi Films ==
- Barsaat Ji Raat (Sindhi: برسات جي رات)
- Bewas (Sindhi: بيوس)
- Ghatu Ghar Na Aaya (Sindhi: گھاتو گھر نہ آيا)
- Mithra Shaal Milan (Sindhi: مٺڙا شال ملن)
- Muhinjo Piyar Pukaray (Sindhi: منھنجو پيار پڪاري)
- Paru (Sindhi: پارو)
- Rat Ain Ajrak (Sindhi: رت ۽ اجرڪ)
- Shaheed (Sindhi: شھيد)

== Balochi film ==
- Hamal o Mah Gaj

== Honours and awards ==
- Pride of Performance Award (1992),
- The First Indus Drama Award (1995)
- He also won a number of Pakistan Television Awards

== Death ==
Noor Muhammad Lashari suffered from diabetes and died on 1 February 1997 in Karachi. He was buried at Manghopir Graveyard in Karachi.
