= Network Television Marketing =

Former Pakistani television company (c. 1990–1999)

- Industry: Television Show Production
- Founded: 1990; 36 years ago
- Defunct: 1999
- Fate: Bankrupted
- Headquarters: Pakistan

Network Television Marketing or NTM was Pakistan's first private television slot. The company's productions first aired on Peoples TV Network (PTN, later renamed as STN) in 1990. In the 1990s, PTN entered into a three-year agreement with Interflow and created NTM Its broadcasts on PTN/STN started in 1990, alongside the channel. One of its initial figures was Tahir Khan, who later owned TV One.

NTM produced plays, stage and music shows. Young artists including Yasir Akhtar, Sania Saeed, Atiqa Odho, Humayoon Saeed, Nadia Khan, Fakhr-e-Alam, and Khalid Anum became comperes and announcers. NTM also broadcast drama serials including Kashkol, Chand Grihan, Dasht, "French Toast", series of telefilms "Tapal Cinema" and Nadan Nadia.

In 1994, NTM launched the first ever pop chart show in the history of Pakistani media industry 'Music Channel Charts'. The pop chart show was directed and produced by Yasir Akhtar and executive producer Ghazanfer Ali. MCC launched the careers of Najam Sheraz, Shehzad Roy, Fakhar-e-Alam, Komal Rizvi, Nadeem Jafri and many more artists. Yasir Akhtar produced and directed more than 60 music videos of different artists who appeared in the show. After Music Channel Charts, Pepsi Cola started a show with NTM called 'Pepsi Top of the Pops' which is similar to the concept of 'Music Channel Charts'.

In 1995, NTM started the first ever musical drama serial of Pakistan 'French Toast'. French Toast was based on a life of a musical band. The drama serial was in total of 7 episodes and it was directed and produced by Yasir Akhtar.

In 1995, NTM started another project, a new trend of musical telefilms 'Tapal Cinema'. The series was in total of six telefilms namely Rahain, Titlee, Shehzadi, Zehar, Chand and Kashish. The project was directed and produced by Yasir Akhtar. The approximate duration of each film was 90 minutes and had different storylines. This series of films launched the careers of Humayun Saeed, Shamoon Abbasi, Javeria Abbasi, Zubair Abbasi and more.

In 1990, STN's broadcasting hours from 7:00 to 11:00 pm daily and 6:00 to 11:00 pm on Saturdays and Sundays were purchased by NTM. NTM's viewership subsequently increased and the company commenced broadcasting during mornings. STN was also able to extend its coverage countrywide, beyond Karachi, Lahore and Islamabad.

NTM was closed down in 1999 as a result of financial difficulties; the network was plagued by inner strife, accusations of corruption, competition against the country's only channel PTV and the popularity of VCRs. As a channel, its broadcasts terminated on 1 July 1999, being replaced by PTV 3. NTM would continue operating indirectly, being responsible for the channel's marketing. The news operation was also shut down due to unpaid taxes. Its staff was dismissed and PTV took over the frequencies, which were to be used for a news channel.

== Shows and plays of NTM ==
- Prime Time Shows (on special occasions)
- Chand Grehan (drama) (Writer : Asghar Nadeem Syed)
- Dasht (drama) (starring; Abid Ali, Atiqa Odho, Nauman Ejaz& Asad Malik)
- Kashkol (drama)
- Red Card (drama)
- Tapal Cinema (The first ever telefilm series of Pakistan) (6 telefilms Rahain, Titlee, Shehzadi, Zehar, Chand and Kashish - 90 minutes approximately each. Directed and produced by Yasir Akhtar)
- Jaal (drama)
- Parosi (drama)
- Aashiyana (drama)
- Pas-e-Aaina (drama)
- Sitara Aur Mehr-un-Nisa (drama; writer: Anwer Maqsood)
- French Toast (7 episodes - Drama serial; directed and produced by: Yasir Akhtar)
- Nadan Nadia (comedy drama by Babra Sharif)
- She Jee (drama)
- Nokar Key Aagey Chakar (comedy drama by Moin Akhtar)
- Studio Chaar Bees (comedy show by Anwer Maqsood, Moin Akhtar)
- Daak Time (Uncle Sargam/Farooq Qaiser, Nadia Khan's first appearance in television)
- Papa ka kia hoga (long play)
- Zehar (tele-film: Humayun Saeed, Mishi Khan) Directed and produced by Yasir Akhtar
- MCC: Music Channel Charts (The first ever pop chart show of Pakistan)
- Pepsi top of the pops (music charts; host: Fakhr-e-Alam)
- VJ: Video Junction (music show for new artists)
- Kesa ("candid camera" show by Hanif Raja)
- Manimal (English series)
- Mind Your Language (English series)
- Automan (English series)
- The Highway Man (English series)
- The Wizard (English series)
- Wiseguy (English series)
- The Fresh Prince of Bel-Air (English sitcom)
- ALF (English sitcom)
- WCW (wrestling)
- WWF (wrestling)

== See also ==
- List of Pakistani television stations
- ATV Pakistan
- Shalimar Television Network
