= Roshan Atta =

Pakistani actress

Roshan Atta (Sindhi: روشن عطا) (b. 1940 – d. 30 March 2011) was a popular radio, television and film actress from Pakistan. After her start as a voice actress in Pakistan Radio drama, she became popular on-stage, as a TV and film actress.

== Early life ==
Atta was born to a doctor in the village Sultan Kot, Shikarpur district, in 1940. She moved to Saudi Arabia with her family, and after spending some years there, returned to Hyderabad and resumed her studies there.

== Professional career ==
Her first Sindhi play Moonjharan Jo Maag was aired in 1972. She became a popular figure of both Sindhi and Urdu plays, including:

- Gharbhaati
- Oalra
- Jiyapo
- Bure Hin Bhanbhor Mein
- Jungle

She also acted in Sindhi films, including:

- Dharti Dil Waran Ji
- Faislo Zamir Jo
- Mamta
- Rat Aeen Ajrak
- Dharti Lal Kunwar
- Ghoonghat Laah Kunwar

Atta also acted in telefilms, including Bainsar Adal Ji and Darya Par. She received a Life Achievement Award from PTV.

== Death ==
She died at the age of 71, on 30 March 2011 from illness.
