= Shalimar Television Network =

Defunct Pakistani semi-government TV channel

Shalimar Television Network (STN) was the first semi-government television channel of Pakistan, the first to break up the monopoly of the state-owned Pakistan Television (PTV). STN started its broadcast in 1990 with the name of People's Television Network (PTN) under the umbrella of Shalimar Recording Company from Islamabad. Later on, it started transmissions from Karachi, Lahore and by the mid-1990s, it was available in the whole country at terrestrial beam. In 1991, the name of PTN was changed to STN (Shalimar TV Network).

== History ==
PTN under settlements with CNN International of USA and British Broadcasting Corporation, BBC of UK started rebroadcast of the programming of CNN International channel and BBC World. In the same year, PTN in an agreement with Interflow (a private company) started a time slot by the name of Network Television Marketing (NTM) which came as a breath of fresh air after General Zia-ul-Haq's military dictatorship era of the 1980s; with its unique and entertainment-filled programming, it gave tough competition to PTV at prime time evening TV viewing time.

=== STN as Channel-3 ===
In 1999, NTM had to quit the airwaves because of a financial crunch, due to charges of corruption and the massification of VCRs. Right after this, STN also ended the re-broadcast programs of CNN International, BBC World and DW. In 1999, under a settlement with PTV Network, STN became "Channel-3".

=== Replacement of STN by ATV ===
In 2005, STN/Channel-3 went off the air and the parent company Shalimar Recording and Broadcasting Company (SRBC) signed an agreement with Sports Star International to start the first ever semi-private channel of Pakistan, ATV channel; the collaboration stayed intact till 2018. From 2018-2020, ATV ran solely under SRBC as a semi-government TV channel. In 2020, it again got a partner from the private sector.

== See also ==
- Network Television Marketing
