= Agha Nasir =

Pakistani director

- Born: 9 February 1937; Meerut, British India
- Died: 12 July 2016 (aged 79); Islamabad, Pakistan
- Occupations: Radio broadcaster, Television producer, Television director
- Years active: 1955 – 2016
- Known for: One of the pioneers of Pakistan Television Corporation

Agha Nasir (9 February 1937 – 12 July 2016), was a Pakistani director, producer, broadcaster and TV playwright. He started his career at Radio Pakistan in 1955. He later directed TV films and worked in the Pakistani television industry for over 50 years. Agha Nasir was considered by many people in Pakistan, as a 'living encyclopedia' of the broadcasting history in Pakistan.

== Career ==
Agha Nasir graduated from the University of Karachi. He was a well-known radio writer, broadcaster and producer before Pakistan Television was launched from Lahore in 1964.

He was one of the people who developed the logo of the Pakistan Television Corporation (PTV). He was a member of the pioneering team of people that first introduced television in Pakistan. This team was headed by Ubaidur Rahman (first General Manager) and 'the dynamic' Aslam Azhar (first managing director) of PTV Lahore Center. Agha Nasir produced the popular TV serials Girah and Pani Peh Naam and directed the PTV drama Taleem-e-Balighan. He guided Pakistan Television through its early days and then helped build it into a national institution. He was promoted many times during his career at Pakistan Television from a playwright to a programmes producer and director, a General Manager and then a managing director at Pakistan Television Corporation at its Lahore Center. He also served as a director general of Pakistan National Council of the Arts (PNCA).

== Books ==
- Gumshuda Log (People we have lost)
- Gulshan-i-Yaad (The Garden of Memory)
- Hum Jeetay Ji Masroof Rahey (We stayed occupied as long as we lived)
- This is PTV - Another Day, Another World
- Agha sey Agha Nasir tak (Autobiography)

== Awards and recognition ==
- President's Pride of Performance Award in 1993.
- Sitara-i-Imtiaz Award (Star of Excellence) by the President of Pakistan in 2012.

== Death and legacy ==
Prime Minister Muhammad Nawaz Sharif expressed grief over his death on 12 July 2016 in Islamabad. Agha Nasir left behind his wife Safia Agha, who died on 26 March 2023, in the month of Ramadan. They are survived by their son Agha Bilal and two daughters - Huma and Shamaila.

A major Pakistani English-language newspaper commented after his death, "He played a pivotal, pioneering role in establishment and development of PTV as a national institution; in fact, the two were inseparable."
