= Lahora Singh =

Sikh artist and poet

Lahora Singh Musawar
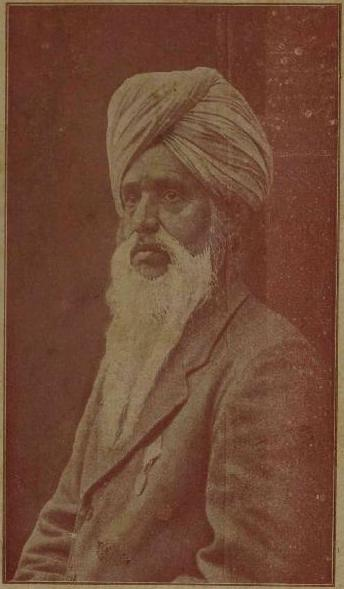
- Photograph of Lahora Singh, ca.1923
- Born: 1865
- Died: Unknown
- Style: Sikh School

Lahora Singh (born 1865) was a Sikh artist. He was the disciple of Mohammad Bakhsh Musawar, whom was the father of Khalifa Imam-ud-din. Early in his career, Lahora Singh worked in the Gumti Bazār, the artists' quarter of Lahore, but later would shift his base-of-operations to Dabbi Bazār in Lahore. Whilst based in Gumti Bazār, Lahora worked alongside Abdur Rahman Chughtai. Lahora was also commissioned by the rulers of Sikh states, such as Patiala and Kapurthala. During the time of partition in 1947, disturbances in the city led to Lahora's studio in Gumti Bazār burning-down, leading to the loss of many of his works. As a result, surviving works of Lahora are rare today. Lahora had a disciple named Milkhi Ram.

Lahora Singh was also an accomplished poet, being a disciple of Baba Hidiyatullah of Mohallah Chabuk Sewaran in Lahore. Lahora produced a Punjabi-language version of the Heer Ranjha folktale, known as Hir Lahori, which he had decorated with illustrations. Lahora also produced a complete and illustrated Janamsakhi work covering the traditional life-stories of Guru Nanak. His unique Janamsakhi illustrations are monochromatic and didactic in-purpose. A collection of his Janamsakhi artwork is kept in the collection of the Museum of Punjab Government Archives in Patiala. A surviving lithograph of the ten Sikh gurus was kept in the personal collection of Hakim Gurcharan Singh of Amritsar. Some surviving works of Lahora can be found in the Patiala Museum and in the private collections of the Kapurthala royals.

== Gallery ==
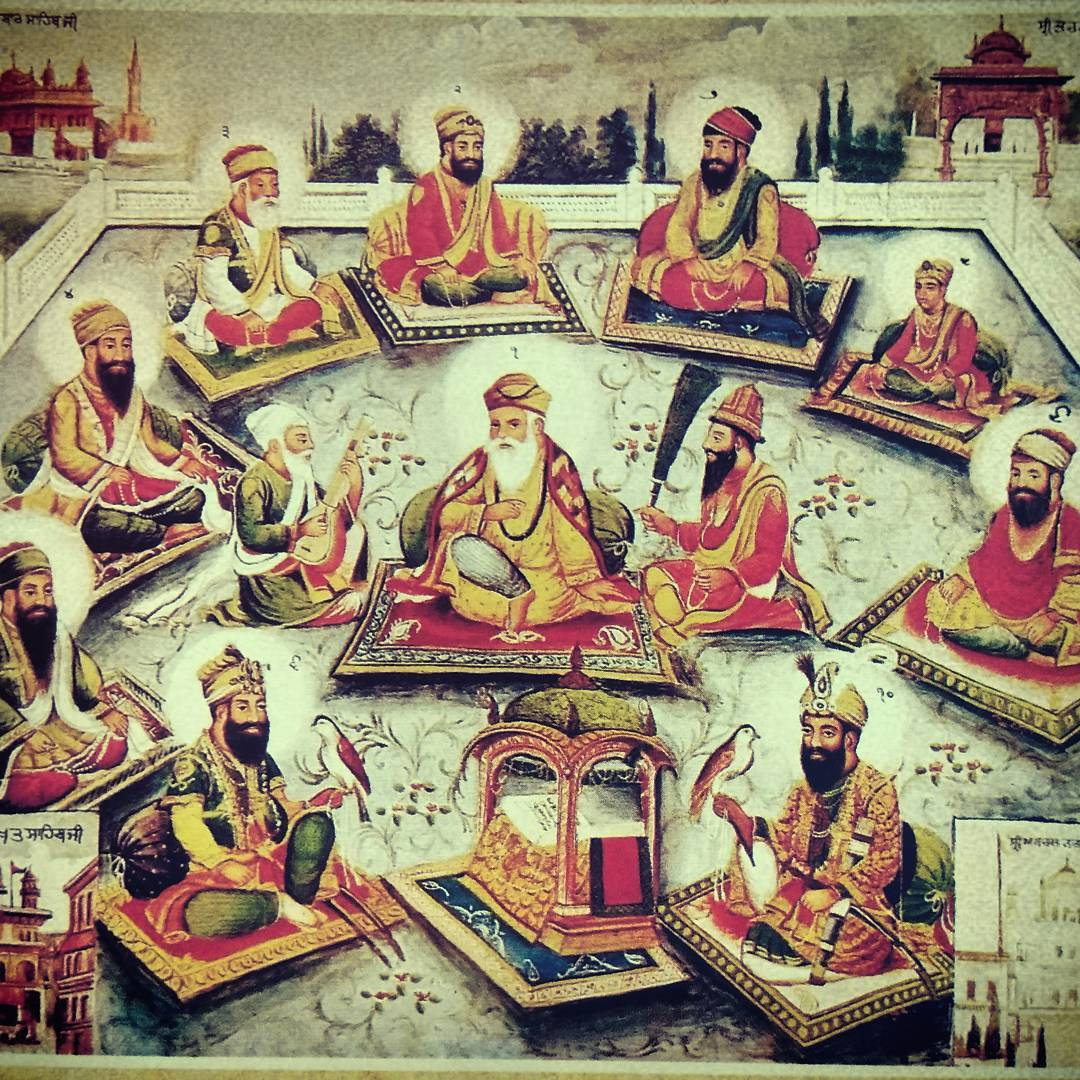
Painting of all the Sikh gurus together, by Lahora Singh Mussawar, ca.1900

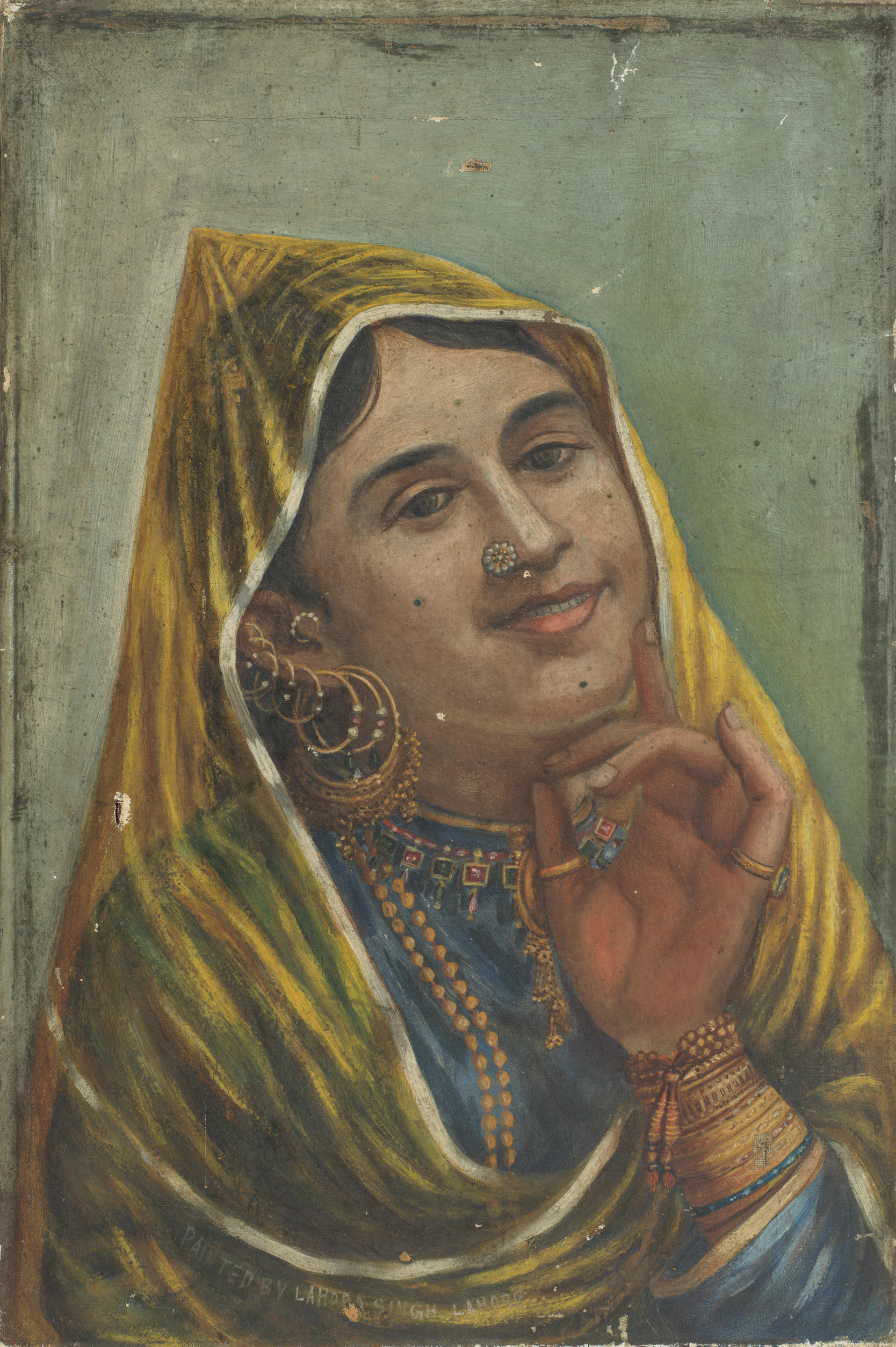
Portrait of a Sikh woman, by the Sikh artist Lahora Singh, circa first half of the 20th century

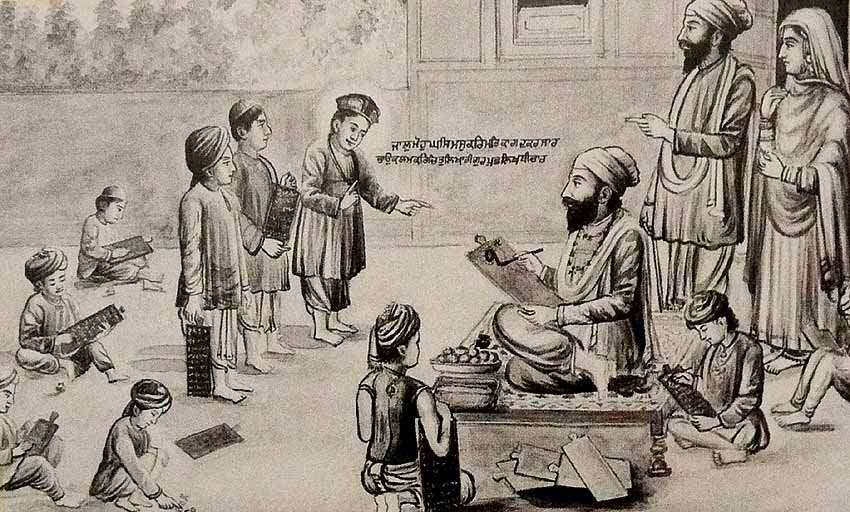
Guru Nanak at school with his teacher Gopal Pandit, by Lahora Singh Mussawar, ca.1900

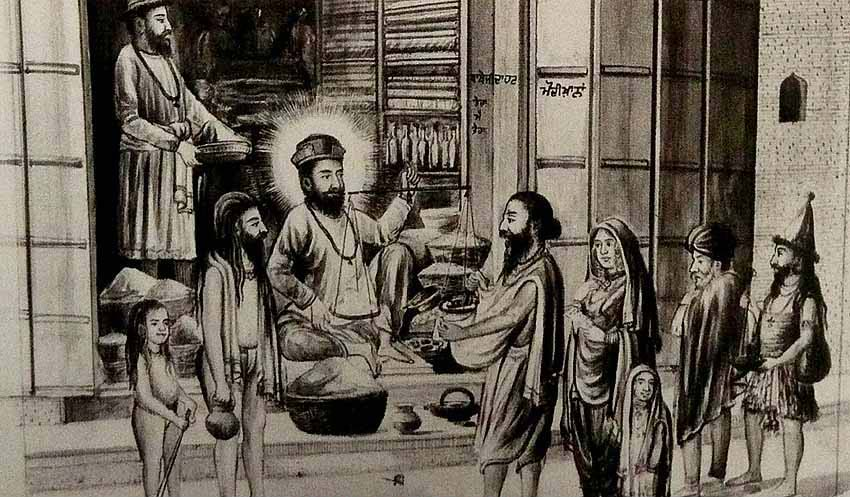
Guru Nanak in service at Daulat Khan Lodhi's stores, by Lahora Singh Mussawar, ca.1900

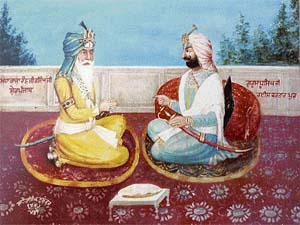
Painting of Maharaja Ranjit Singh seated with Baba Sadhu Singh Sodhi, by Lahora Singh, circa late 19th century

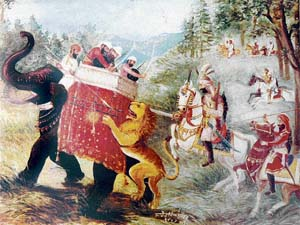
Painting of Baba Sadhu Singh Sodhi hunting a lion, he was a descendent of Dhir Mal, by Lahora Singh, circa late 19th century

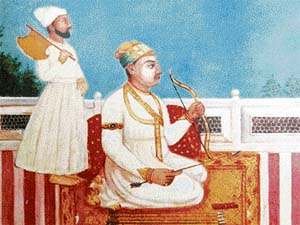
Painting of Baba Gurditta Sodhi (eldest son of Guru Hargobind), by Lahora Singh, circa late 19th century

Title page of Qissa Puran Bhagat, by Lahora Singh, Miyan Mango Lahore, 1923
