= Suraiya Shahab =

Pakistani newscaster

- ثریا شہاب
- Born: 1945
- Died: 13 September 2019 (aged 73–74); Islamabad
- Education: MA in journalism and political science
- Occupation: Newscaster
- Years active: 1960s - 2000
- Television: PTV
- Children: 2 sons and a daughter

Suraiya Shahab (1945 – 13 September 2019) was a Pakistani newscaster, poet, and novelist. She worked as a news presenter at Radio Pakistan, Pakistan Television, BBC Urdu, and German radio Deutsche Welle from the 1960s to the 1990s.

== Early life and education ==
Suraiya was born in 1945. She earned her Masters in journalism and political science. Later, she was also pursuing a Ph.D. in political science but dropped out after being diagnosed with cancer.

== Career ==
Suraiya began her broadcasting career in the 1960s by voicing in dramas at Radio Pakistan, Karachi. Later, she was selected for a magazine program by Radio Iran Zahedan. The program became the reason for her success and fame. After spending over ten years in Zahedan, she returned to Pakistan in 1973 and became associated with Pakistan Television and Radio Pakistan until she was selected for BBC Urdu Service in 1984. In the 1990s, she moved to Germany and worked for many years for the German national radio Deutsche Welle. During her stay in Frankfurt, she authored 2 novels, a collection of fiction, and a collection of poetry.

== Personal life ==
Suraiya first married her colleague and Bengali artist Nazrul Isalm Afza while she was working for Radio Pakistan at Karachi. Later, they moved to Iran. Two of her three children were born in Iran. During the early 80s, her first husband died. Her second husband was from Germany. She had two sons and a daughter.

== News presentations ==
Year	Title	Role	Network
1960s		Host	Radio Iran
1973 - 1984	Urdu Khabrein	Newscaster	Radio Pakistan
1973 – 1984	PTV Khabarnama	Newscaster	Pakistan Television
1984 – 1990s	Sairbeen	News presenter	BBC Urdu
1990s – 2000		News presenter	Deutsche Welle

== Books ==
- "Khud Se Aik Sawal" — a collection of Urdu poems and ghazals
- Safar Jari Hai (Urdu novel)

== Philanthropy ==
From the platform of a welfare organization called "Youth League", Suraiya participated in several welfare works.

== Death ==
Suraiya died on the morning of Friday, 13 September 2019, at the age of 75. She was suffering from Dementia due to a surgery of her brain. She was sick from 2002 until 2019 as her mental health was deteriorating badly. She died at her eldest son's place. She was buried in the local cemetery of Islamabad.
