= Mahpara Safdar =

Pakistani journalist and former newscaster

- مہ پارہ صفدر
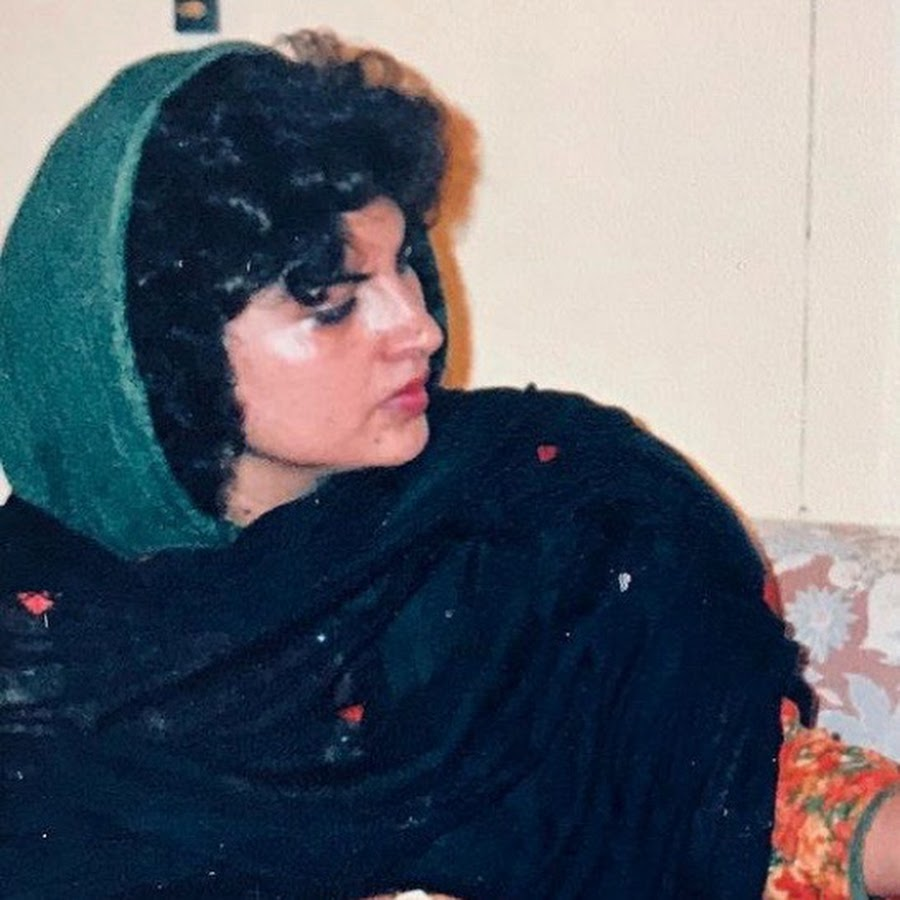
- Mahpara Safdar
- Born: Mahpara Zaidi; 15 November 1954 (age 71); Lahore, Pakistan
- Education: University of the Punjab (MA in English); University of London (MA in women's studies)
- Occupations: Journalist; column writer; former newscaster
- Years active: 1974–present
- Television: Pakistan Television
- Spouse: Safdar Hamdani (m. 1979)
- Children: 3
- Father: Syed Hassan Abbas Zaidi
- Awards: PTV Award (1984); Nigar Award (1983)

Mahpara Safdar (Urdu: مہ پارہ صفدر; born 15 November 1954) is a Pakistani journalist, column writer, and former newscaster at PTV, Radio Pakistan, and BBC Urdu.

== Early life and education ==
Safdar was born on 15 November 1954, in Lahore. Her father, Syed Hassan Abbas Zaidi, was a poet and was associated with the education department. Safdar was the fourth of six sisters. She came to Sargodha with her parents as a child and received her primary, high school, and college education from Sargodha. She earned her master's degree in English from the University of the Punjab, Lahore. Meanwhile, she also participated in university programs on Radio Pakistan. Later in her career, she did MA in women's studies from the University of London.

== Career ==
Safdar joined Pakistan Television Lahore as a newscaster in 1977. She remained associated with PTV till 1990. In January 1990, she went abroad with her family and joined BBC Urdu Service in London, where she worked as a newscaster till 2014. She did several broadcasting courses at the BBC.

According to a Gallup survey conducted in 1986, she was the most popular female PTV newscaster.

Safdar has also been working as the editor for current affairs in the Aalami Akhbar since November 2006.

== Personal life ==
In August 1979, Safdar married poet and radio producer Safdar Hamadani. They have three children.

== News presentations ==
Year	Title	Role	Network	Ref.
1975 – 1990	Urdu Khabrein	Newscaster	Radio Pakistan	
1975 – 1990	PTV Khabarnama	Newscaster	Pakistan Television	
1990 – 2014	Sairbeen	News presenter	BBC Urdu	

== Books ==
- Mera Zamana Meri Kahani (autobiography), published by Book Corner, Jehlam, in 2022, ISBN 978-969-662-470-7

== Awards and recognition ==
Year	Award	Category	Result	Ref.
1983	Nigar Award	Best Newscaster	Won	
1984	PTV Award	Best Newscaster	Won	
