= Abdur Rahman Chughtai =

Pakistani painter (1894–1975)

Abdur Rahman Chughtai عبد الرحمن چغتائی PP HI
- Born: 21 September 1897; Lahore, Punjab, British India
- Died: 17 January 1975 (aged 80); Lahore, Punjab, Pakistan
- Movement: Chughtai style of painting
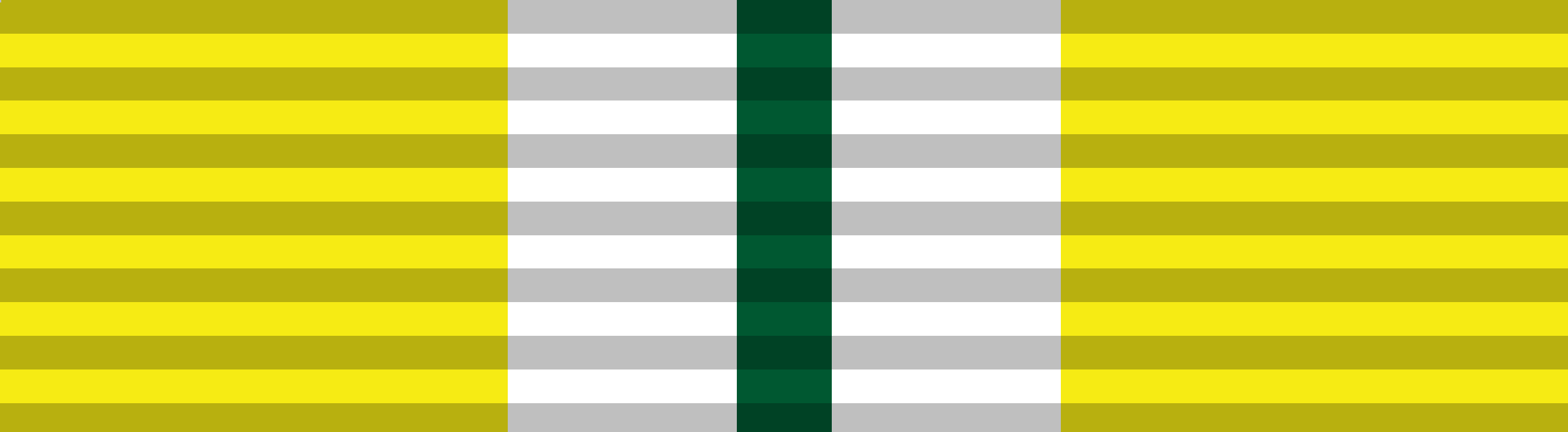
- Awards: Khan Bahadur Hilal-i-Imtiaz Pride of Performance
- Website: chughtaimuseum.com

Abdur Rahman Chughtai (21 September 1894 – 17 January 1975) was a Pakistani painter, artist, and intellectual, regarded as the national artist of Pakistan. He is accredited with establishing a distinctive painting style called the 'Chughtai Style', influenced by Mughal, Persian, and Bengali Art, miniature painting, Art Nouveau and Islamic art traditions. He is considered to be 'the first significant modern Muslim artist from Pakistan',

He was given the title of Khan Bahadur by the British Empire in British India in 1934, awarded Pakistan's Hilal-i-Imtiaz (Crescent of Excellence) Award in 1960, and the Pride of Performance Award in 1958 by the President of Pakistan.

== Early life ==
Chughtai was born on 21 September 1897 in Lahore, now in Pakistan. He was the second son of Karim Bukhsh, who belonged to a prominent Punjabi Muslim family of artists descending from generations of craftsmen, architects, and decorators. Chughtai briefly learned naqqashi from his uncle Baba Miran Shah Naqqash at a local mosque.

== Education and Early Career ==
After completing his education at the Railway Technical School, Lahore, in 1911, Chughtai joined the Mayo School of Arts, Lahore (now called National College of Arts, Lahore), where Samarendranath Gupta, a pupil of Abanindranath Tagore was Vice-Principal. After leaving the school, he made a living for a while as a photographer and drawing teacher. He eventually became the head instructor in chromo-lithography at the Mayo School.

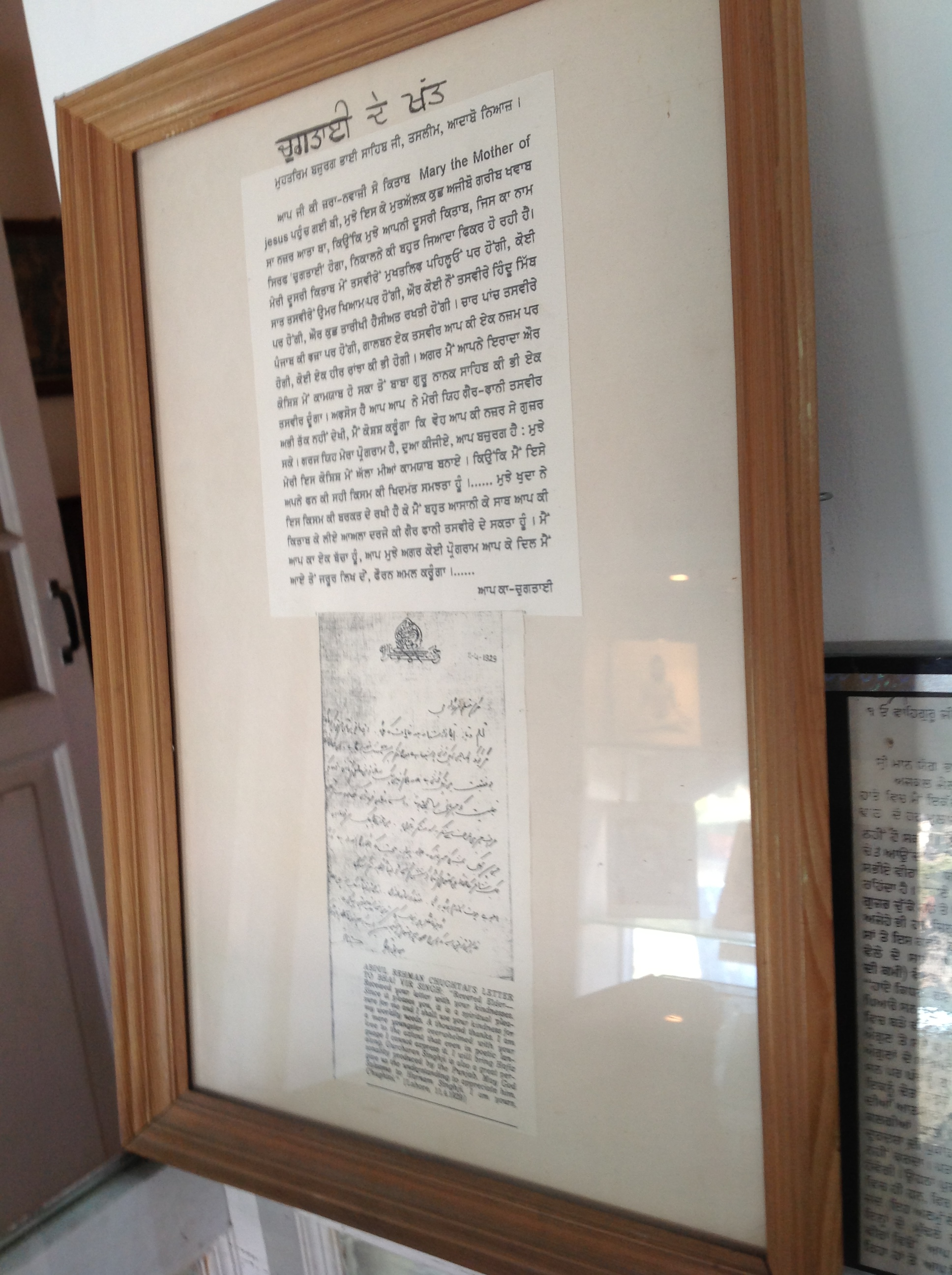
Letter of Chugtai to Bhai Vir Singh

In 1916, Chughtai's first painting in a revivalist 'oriental' style appeared in the Modern Review magazine. He had his first exhibition in 1920 at the Punjab Fine Art Society. He also exhibited with the Indian School of Oriental Art during the 1920s, by which time he had become quite renowned. His work contributed greatly to Lahore's burgeoning modern art scene. While he predominantly worked with watercolors, Chughtai was also a print-maker, perfecting his etching skills in London during visits in the mid-1930s. His sketches were used in many books in Punjabi poetry by Bhai Vir Singh for illustrating his famous poems like "Kambadi Kalai" and including his famous epic "Rana Surat Singh". Chughtai offered his gratitude to Bhai Vir Singh for becoming part of these illustrations as a young artist in his letter to him on 11.04.1929

In his sixty years of artistic creation, Chughtai produced nearly 2000 watercolours, thousands of pencil sketches, and nearly 300 etchings and aquatints. He also wrote short stories, and articles on art. He designed stamps, coins, insignia and book covers. He was also an avid collector of miniatures and other art. He published three books of his own work: the Muraqqai-i-Chughtai (1927), Naqsh-i-Chughtai (c. 1935) and Chughtai's Paintings (1940). The Muraqqa-i-Chughtai was a sumptuously illustrated edition of Mirza Ghalib's Urdu poetry, with a foreword by Sir Muhammad Iqbal. It is regarded as the most significant work of Chughtai's career and in its time, was considered the finest achievement in book production in the country.

After the creation of Pakistan in 1947, Chughtai came to be regarded as one of the most famous representatives of Pakistan. Chughtai's paintings were given to visiting heads of state. Allama Iqbal, Pablo Picasso, and Elizabeth II were amongst his admirers.

Chughtai's closest associate was his younger brother Abdullah Chughtai, a scholar and researcher of Islamic art. Chughtai married twice, and had two children, a son and daughter. He died in Lahore on 17 January 1975.

== Art ==
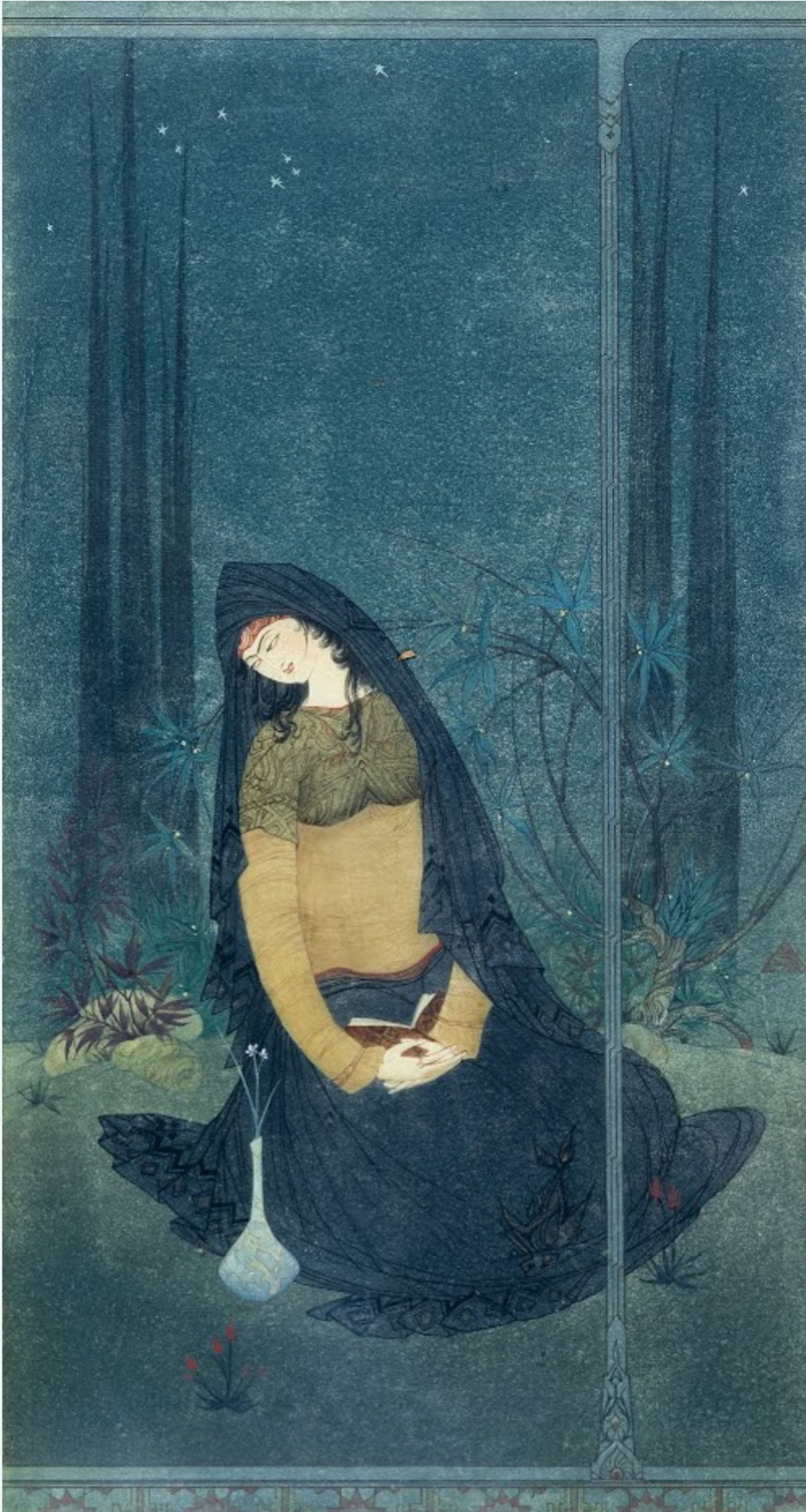
Night of Nishapur. A poetess seated in a pavilion holding a book in her hand, by Abdul Rahman Chughtai, early 20th century, Lahore museum.

Chughtai's early watercolours take off from the revivalism of the Bengal School of Art – his Jahanara and the Taj, for instance, shows the influence of Abanindranath Tagore's The Last Moments of Shah Jahan. By the 1940s, he had created his own style, strongly influenced by Islamic art traditions, but retaining a feel of Art Nouveau. His subject matter was drawn from the legends, folklore and history of the Indian and Islamic worlds, including Punjab, Persia, and the world of the Mughals. He painted Hindu deities, famous personalities from Islamic stories and traditions, and royal figures from Mughal and Rajput lineages.

Abdur Rahman Chughtai also designed the logo for the Pakistan Television Corporation (PTV) at the behest of its first general manager, Ubaidur Rahman. The logo has been tweaked and modified over the years since its inception but remains fundamentally the same. On Pakistan's independence day in 1951, he produced a set of 9 stamps, better known as 'Chughtai Art set'. At that time, this set was considered as the most beautiful stamps of the world.

Artist and gallery owner Salima Hashmi deems Chughtai one of South Asia's foremost painters. "He was part of the movement that started in the early part of the 20th century to establish an identity indigenous to the subcontinent", she said. "He rejected the hegemony of the British Colonial aesthetic".

Chughtai produced his first dry-point etching, Under the Arch, in London in 1932 under the private tutelage of Douglas Ian Smart, before further refining his printmaking skills during a 1936 visit where Paul Drury served as his personal etching tutor.”

== Painting exhibits ==
Chughtai's works are owned by the British Museum, the Victoria and Albert Museum, the National Gallery of Modern Art (New Delhi), the Peace Palace (in The Hague), United Nations Headquarters, New York, the Kennedy Memorial in Boston, the US State Department (in Washington, D.C.), President's House Bonn, AP State Archaeology Museum,

Queen Juliana's Palace in the Netherlands, Emperor's Palace Bangkok, President House Islamabad, Governors' Houses in Lahore and Karachi, and the National Art Gallery, Islamabad. Many of his works are at the Chughtai Museum Trust in Lahore, Pakistan.

== Works ==
- Maqalat-i Chughtaʾi. 2 vols. Islamabad: Idarah-yi Saqafat-i Pakistan, 1987.
- Lahaur ka dabistan-i musavviri. Lahore: Chughtai Museum Trust, 1979.
- Chughtai’s Paintings. 2nd ed. Lahore: Print Printo Press, 1970.
- Amal-i Chughtaʾi: Poet of the East Lahore: Self-published, 1968.
- Naqsh-i Chughtaʾi: Divan-i Ghalib Musavvir. Lahore: Ahsan Bradarz, 1962.
- Chughtai’s Indian Paintings. New Delhi: Dhoomi Mal, 1951.
- Muraqqaʿ-i Chughtaʾi. Lahore: Jahangir Book Club, 1927.

== Other works ==
Among Chughtai's popularly known works are Hashim Shahbaz and Radio Pakistan and his painting of Anarkali for the cover of a 1992 drama. Additionally, one of the most successful UNICEF cards features a Chughtai piece. He was also known for his designs of postage stamps. United Nations Organization art correspondent Jacob-Baal Teshuva wrote that Chughtai's paintings are the largest set released in 1948.

== Awards and recognition ==
- Awarded the title of 'Khan Bahadur' in 1934 by the British Empire
- Hilal-i-Imtiaz (Crescent of Excellence) Award in 1960 by the President of Pakistan
- Pride of Performance Award in 1958 by the President of Pakistan

== Gallery ==
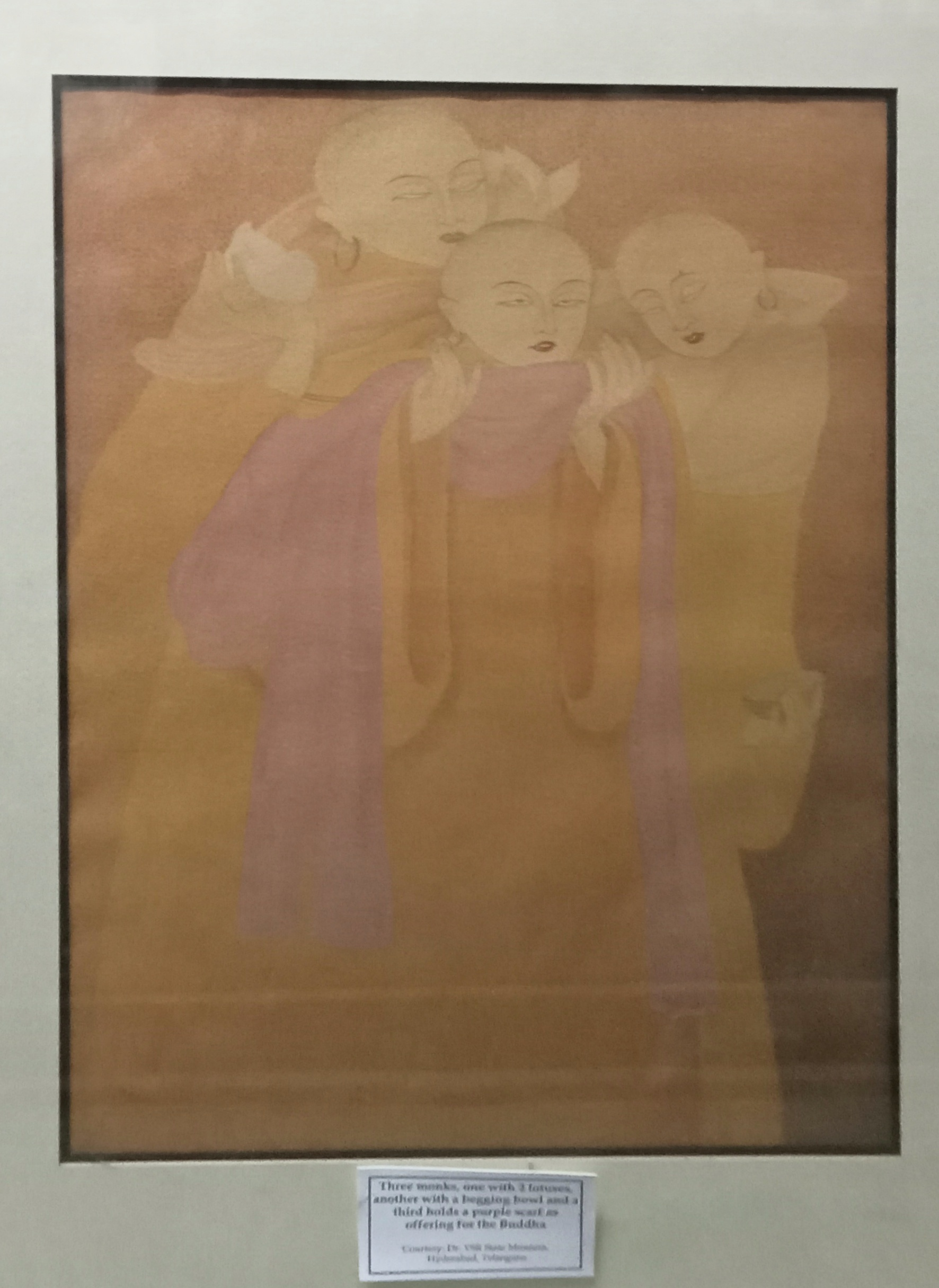

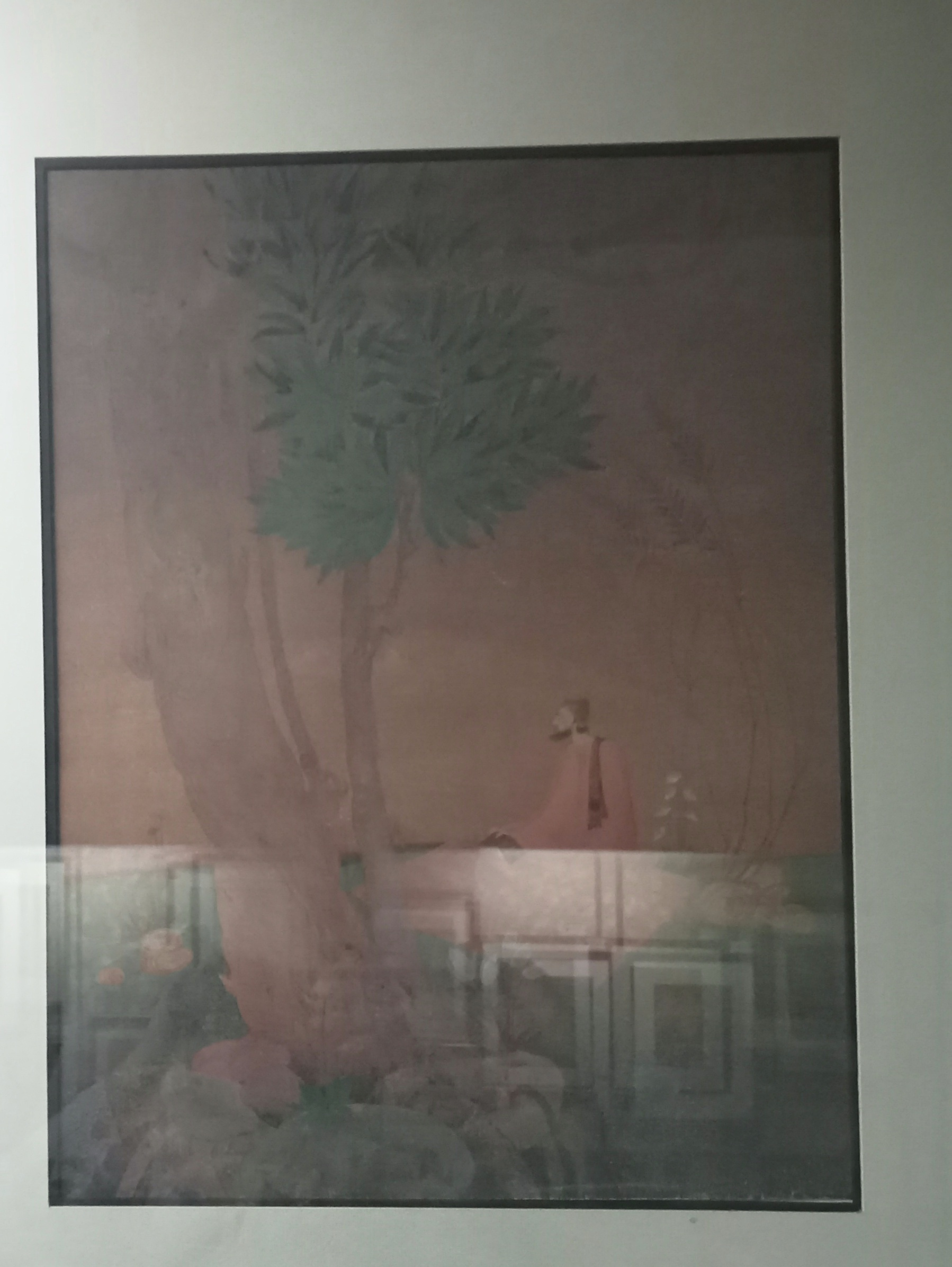

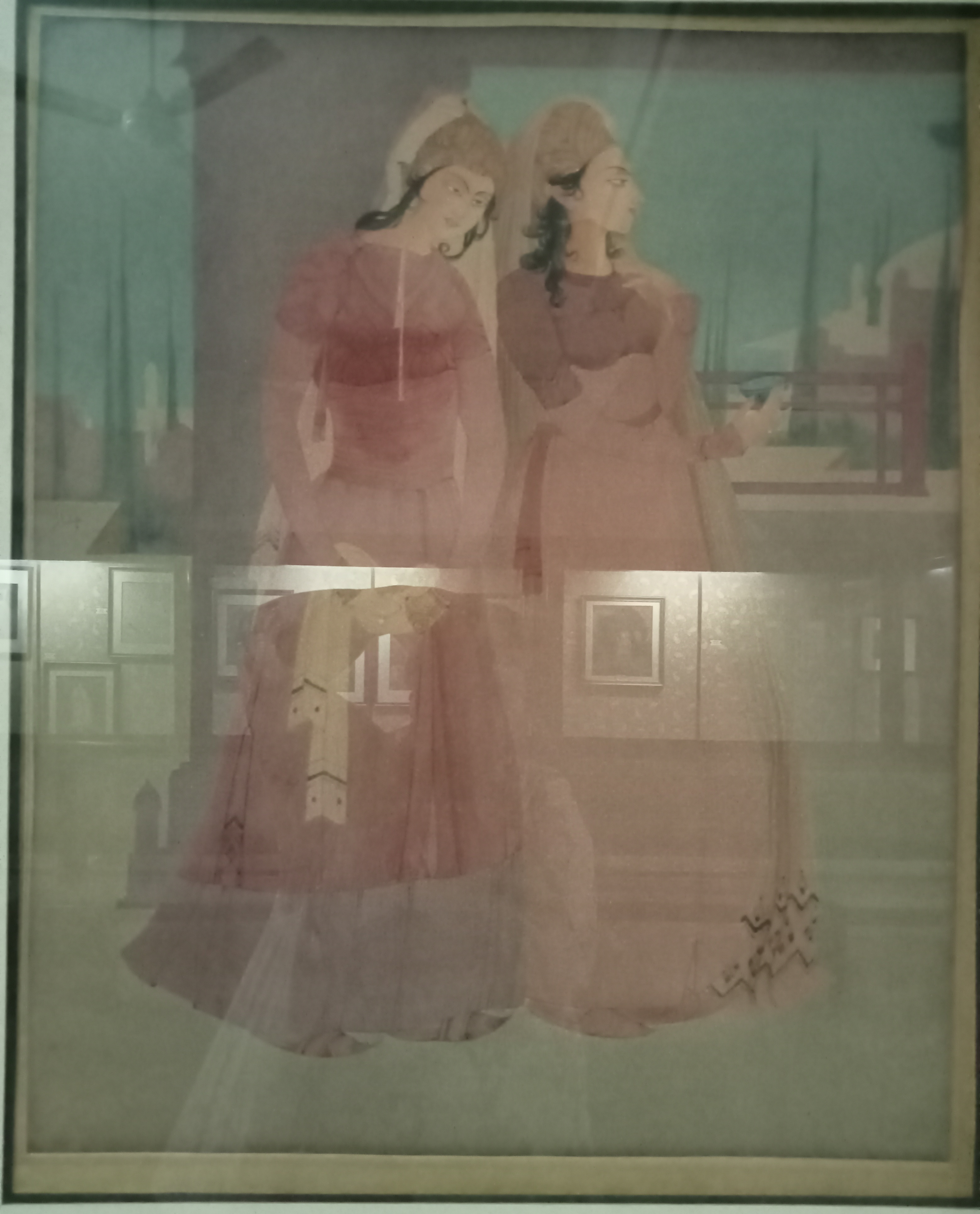

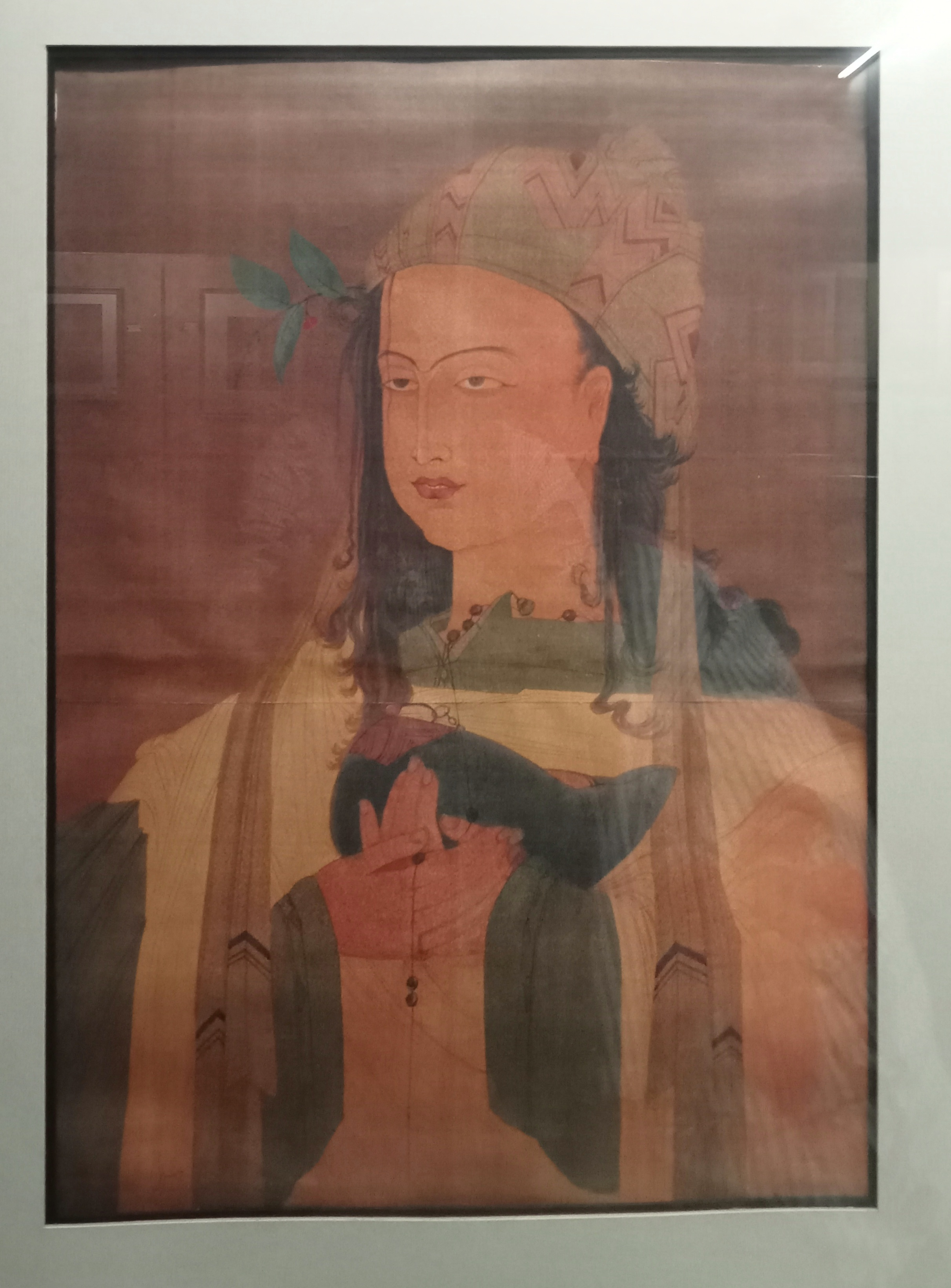

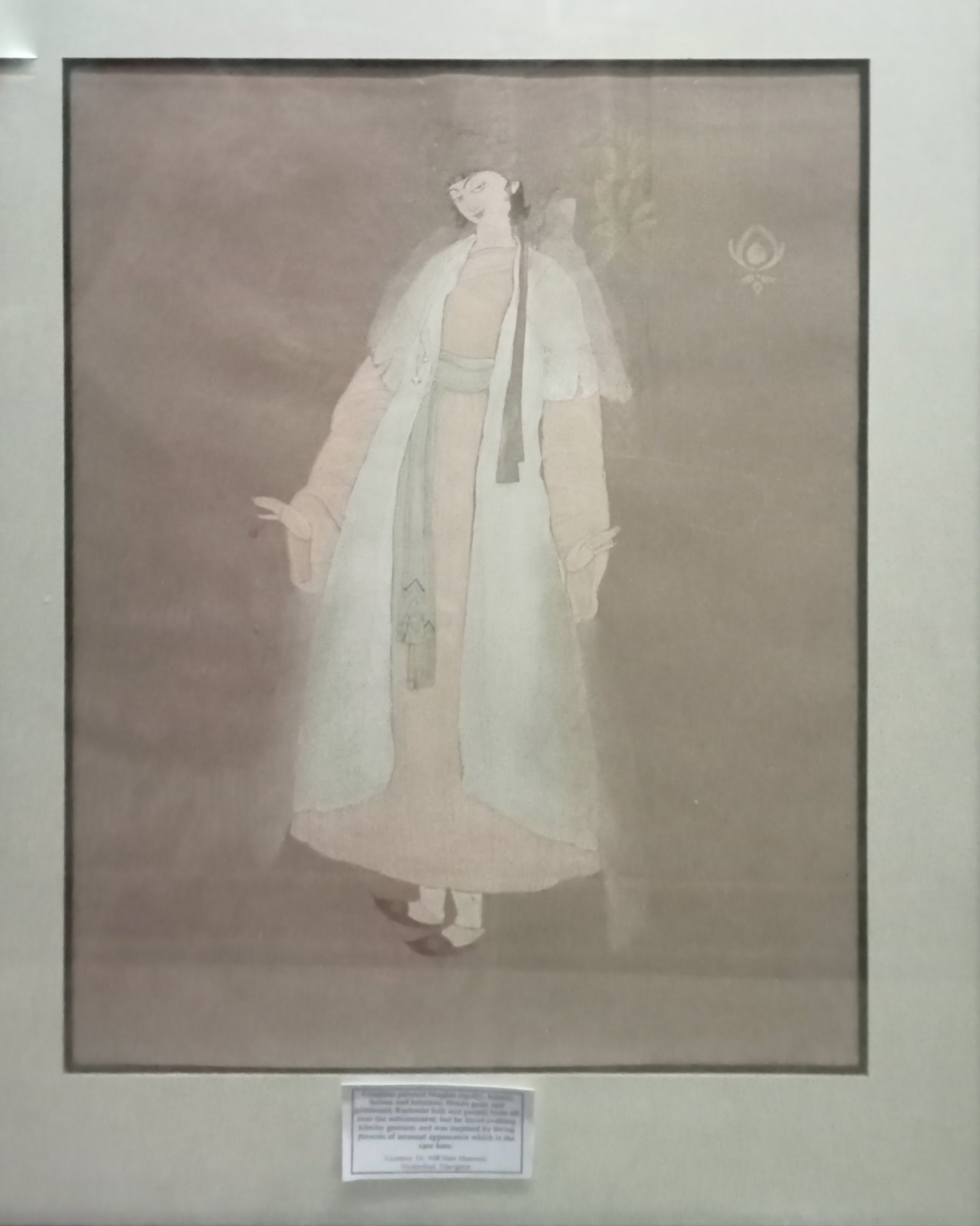

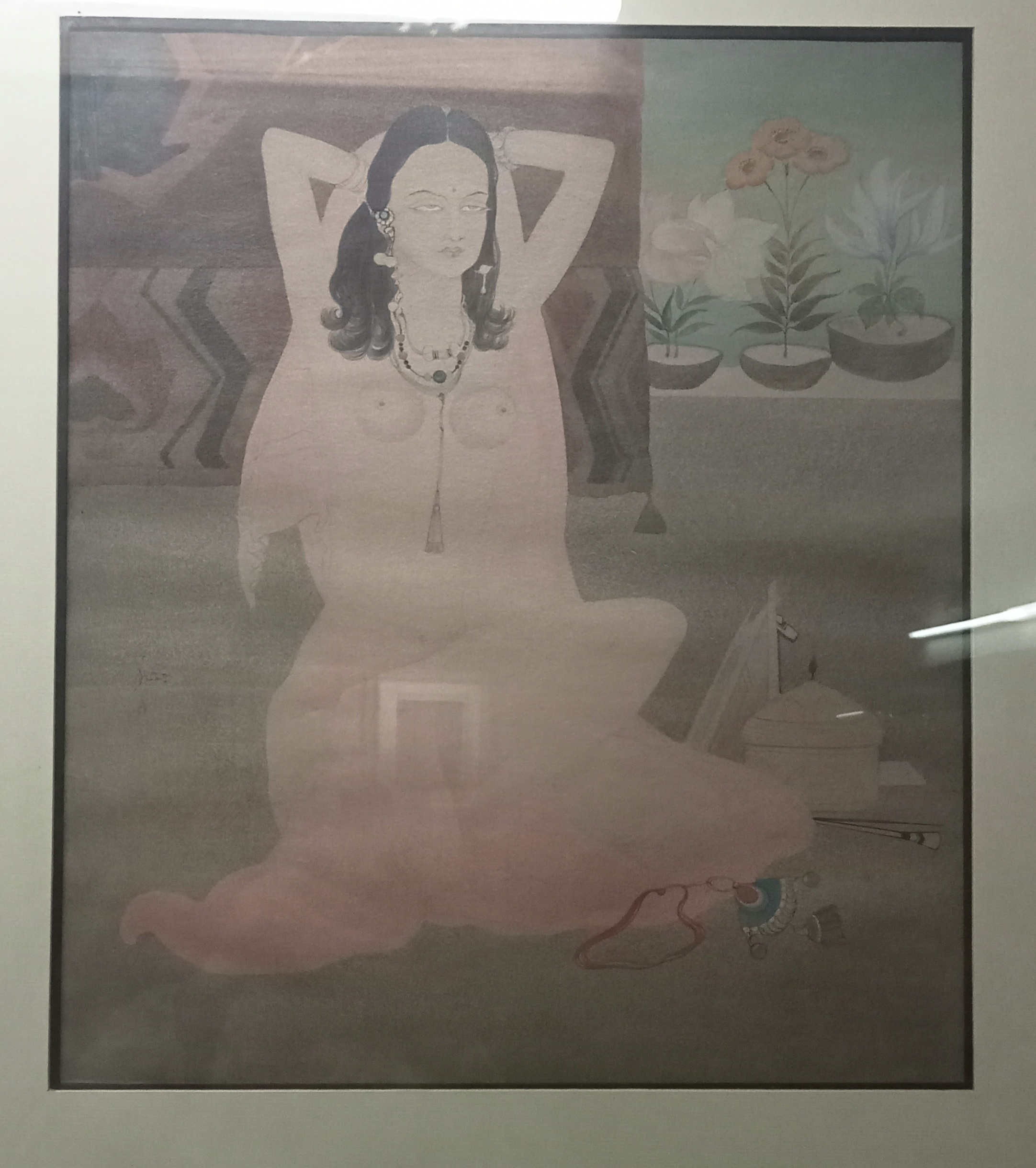

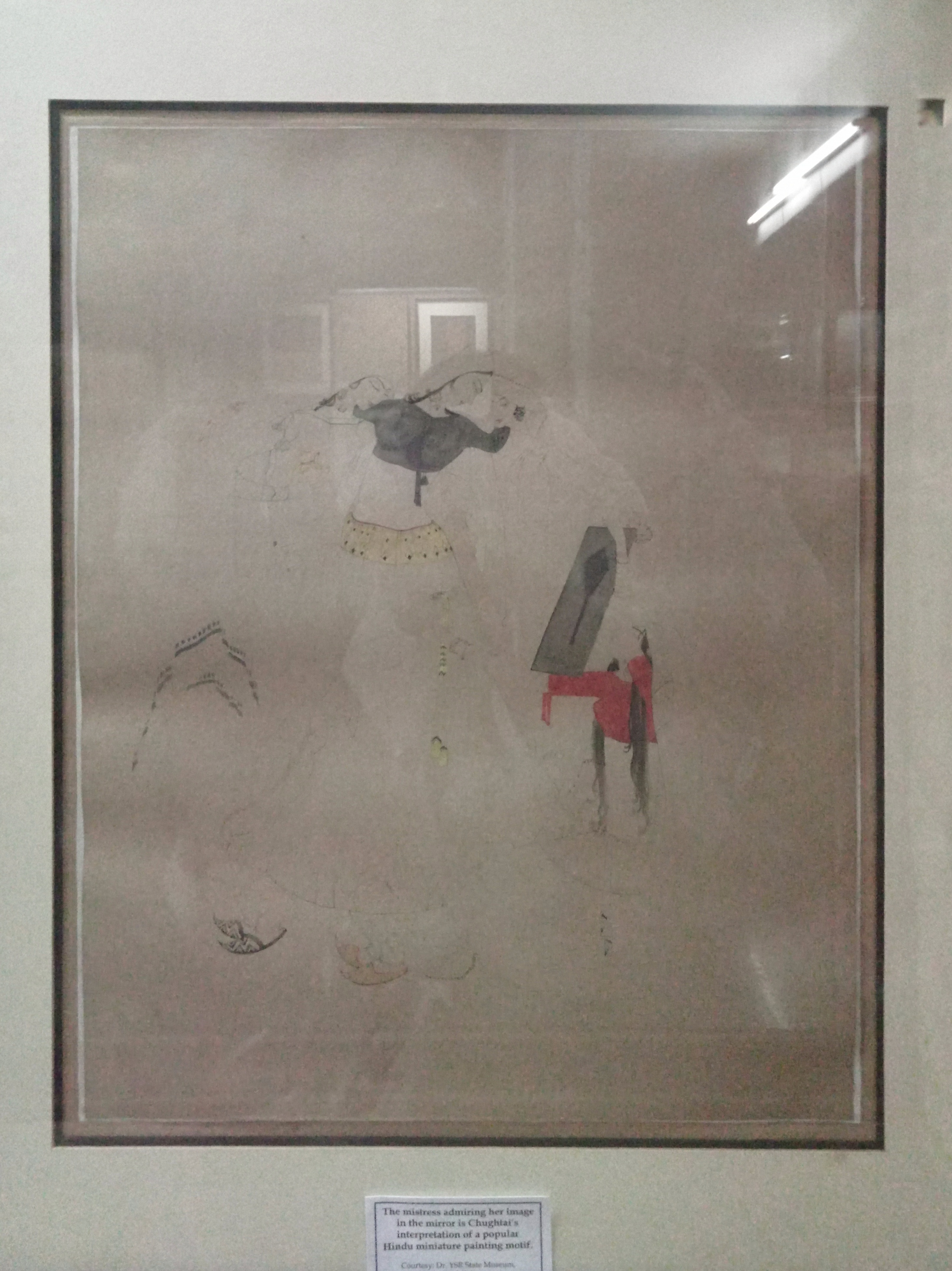

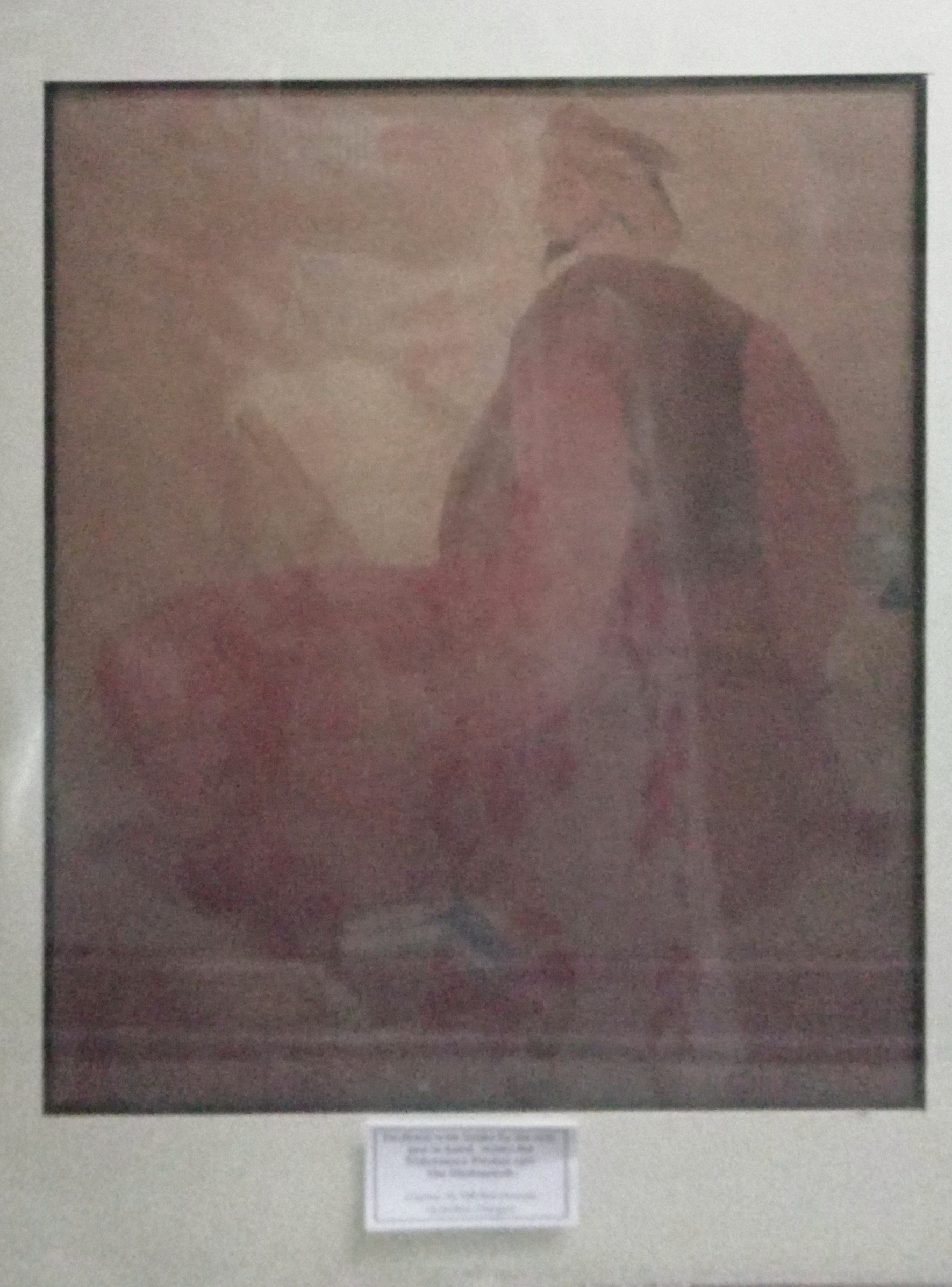

== See also ==
- Anarkali
