= Ghazala Yasmeen =

Pakistani newscaster

- Born: Ghazala Yasmeen Begum; 1 January 1948 (age 78); Delhi, India
- Education: University of Karachi
- Occupations: Announcer; Radio Artist
- Years active: 1967–2010
- Spouse: Aftab Azeem (husband)
- Children: 3

Ghazala Yasmeen (born 1 January 1948) is a Pakistani former newscaster and announcer at PTV and Radio Pakistan.

== Early life ==
She was born in Delhi and then her parents moved to Pakistan and settled in Karachi. She completed her studies from University of Karachi and studied political science and graduated with a master's degree.

Ghazala was doing masters then one day at home Ghazala was reading a dawn newspaper and saw an advertisement about an audition for announcers and newscaster at PTV Karachi Centre which was being established. She sought her father's approval and he supported her decision to become an announcer. Then she sent her application to PTV Karachi Centre. Later a PTV director contacted Ghazala and told her that she had been selected among ten people. Then she went to Islamabad for training and was trained by Sikander Shaheen and Aslam Azhar.

== Career ==
She started working at Radio in Islamabad when transmissions were newly started and she mostly presented weather news. Then she started working as a host and story teller in a children's program. Ghazala made her first TV announcement in 1967, when PTV started its broadcast in Karachi. She was the first person to be seen on the state TV and went on to become the first female PTV announcer at PTV Karachi Centre. She worked at PTV Karachi Centre an as announcer for eleven years.

In 1970 Ghazala announced the results of Pakistan's first general election, which were won by Zulfikar Ali Bhutto. Ghazala also worked at Sairbeen and then in 1971 she announced the news of Indo-Pakistani War of 1971 and broadcast the events of East Pakistan.

In 1989 at 9th PTV Awards she was honoured with Silver Jubilee Award for her contributions to the Media and Radio Industry. She worked as a newscaster for thirty seven years at PTV Karachi Centre.

Then she shifted to Public Relations Department and worked there till 2010.

== Personal life ==
Ghazala married PTV producer Aftab Azeem and had three children including one son and two daughters.

== Filmography ==
=== News presentations ===
| Year | Title | Role |
|---|---|---|
| 1967–1979 | Urdu Khabrein | Newscaster |
| 1970 | Sairbeen | News presenter |
| 1977 | PTV Khabarnama | Newscaster |

=== Other appearances ===
| Year | Title | Role |
|---|---|---|
| 2022 | Good Morning Pakistan | Herself |
| 2022 | Safar Mohabbaton Ka | Herself |

== Awards and nominations ==
| Year | Award | Category | Result | Title | Ref. |
|---|---|---|---|---|---|
| 1989 | PTV Awards | Silver Jubilee | Won | Contribution to Media Industry | |
