= Sairbeen =

BBC Urdu programme

- Also known as: سیربین
- Genre: News; Current affairs
- Presented by: Aliya Nazki
- Country of origin: United Kingdom
- Original language: Urdu

Production
- Production locations: BBC Broadcasting House, London
- Running time: 25 minutes
- Production company: BBC World Service

Original release
- Network: BBC Urdu
- Release: 1968 – present

Sairbeen (Urdu: سیربین) is a flagship news and current affairs programme produced by BBC Urdu, currently being distributed on online platforms including YouTube. It is currently hosted by Aliya Nazki. The show first began airing in 1968 on radio, and was previously hosted by notable Pakistani broadcasters and journalists including Suraiya Shahab, Shafi Naqi Jamie, Mahpara Safdar, Ghazala Yasmeen, Waqar Ahmad Khan, Adil Shahzeb, Aamir Ahmad Khan, Ahmad Raza, Raza Ali Abidi and Amber Shamsi. This programme is broadcast from London by BBC Urdu.

== History ==
With its start in 1968, it acquired a huge following in Pakistan. During the Indo-Pakistani War of 1971, it was notable for broadcasting the events of the war in East Pakistan even as state media was stating that everything was fine in the eastern wing. By the time of the 1999 Pakistani coup d'état, it had acquired around 20 million people tuning in each week.

In 2014, BBC started broadcasting the programme on Aaj TV under a partnership agreement.

In January 2021, BBC Urdu stopped broadcasting the programme on Aaj TV and terminated the agreement, citing interference with their editorial policy as one of the reasons, and moved distribution of the programme to YouTube and other online platforms.
