= Pakistan Television Corporation =

National television corporation of Pakistan

- Type: Broadcast; Satellite television
- Branding: PTV
- Country: Pakistan
- Availability: Nationwide and Worldwide
- Headquarters: Islamabad
- Broadcast area: Pakistan and Worldwide
- Owner: Ministry of Information and Broadcasting, Government of Pakistan
- Key people: Ambreen Jan (Managing Director)
- Launch date: 26 November 1964; 61 years ago
- Picture format: 1080p HDTV (downscaled to 16:9 576i for SDTV sets)
- Official website: www.ptv.com.pk
- Language: Urdu,English,

Pakistan Television Corporation (Urdu: پاکستان ٹیلی وژن نیٹ ورک, romanised: Pākistān Ṭelīvižan Neṭvark, lit. 'Pakistan Television Network'; reporting name: PTV), also known as Pakistan Television, is the Pakistani public broadcaster based in Islamabad, Pakistan, which comprises a number of TV channels.

The PTV has been operated and managed directly under the Ministry of Information and Broadcasting of the federal Government of Pakistan since its founding on 26 November 1964, when a pilot television station was established at Lahore, Punjab.

== History ==
=== Background ===
The idea of establishing a media and television industry was conceived in late 1956 and created by the privately set up National Education Commission with the support of President Ayub Khan in 1960. In 1961, the private sector media mogul and industrialist Syed Wajid Ali launched a television industrial development project, bringing the role of Ubaidur Rahman, an electrical engineer in the Engineering Division of Radio Pakistan, as the project director of the first television station in Lahore. Ali reached a milestone in 1961 after establishing a private television broadcasting company with the cooperation of Nippon Electric Company (NEC) of Japan and Thomas Television International of the United Kingdom.

In 1963, a public meeting was chaired by President Ayub Khan, in which the government made decisions about the Pakistan Television stations and the media industry in the country. Since 1963, its headquarters have been in Islamabad, near the Cabinet Secretariat. From 1961 to 1962, a television headquarters was established in Lahore, and several pilot transmission tests were taken by Rahman's team. Subsequently, many television divisions were established throughout Pakistan by this team, including East-Pakistan.

=== First-ever broadcast and private ownership ===
Although it was originally supposed to go on air on 1 September 1964 the first-ever TV broadcast was done on 26 November 1964 after an introduction by Syed Wajid Ali, which was beamed as a black and white transmission by the PTV. The first programme, formatted by Thomson Television International, telecasted amateur programmes with foreign films; the television division in the Punjab Province was established with the help of the United Nations Educational, Scientific and Cultural Organization (UNESCO), the Colombo Plan, and the Government of Japan. Aslam Azhar (1932–29 December 2015) was appointed the first managing director of the Pakistan Television in charge of all the staffing requirements at the first PTV Lahore, Centre. This first managing director and executive, Aslam Azhar is widely considered to be the "father of Pakistan Television". Private industry commercials were permitted with no fee; initially all the commercials of industrial conglomerates were tax-free with no additional charges.

The PTV remained under the private sector management, with more than half of the shares sold to Ministry of Information and Broadcasting in a fear that all shares would fall into the hands of the government in the name of the greater interest of the country.

The project began with a tent on the back lot of Pakistan Broadcasting Corporation by Ubaidur Rahman, where a transmission tower and a studio were constructed by his team. On 26 November 1964, President Ayub Khan inaugurated the first official television station commencing transmission broadcasts from Lahore, followed by Dacca on 25 December 1964 (then the capital of East Pakistan; renamed Bangladesh Television in 1971), a third centre was established in Rawalpindi and Islamabad in 1965 and the fourth in Karachi in 1966. On 29 May 1967, a private company was established as Pakistan Television Corporation under the Company Act, 1913, whereas the private sector remained charged with broadcasting on the television. At that time, all studio programmes were telecasted live, as no VTR recording machines were available, which were made available in 1968.

=== Nationalisation of Pakistan Television ===
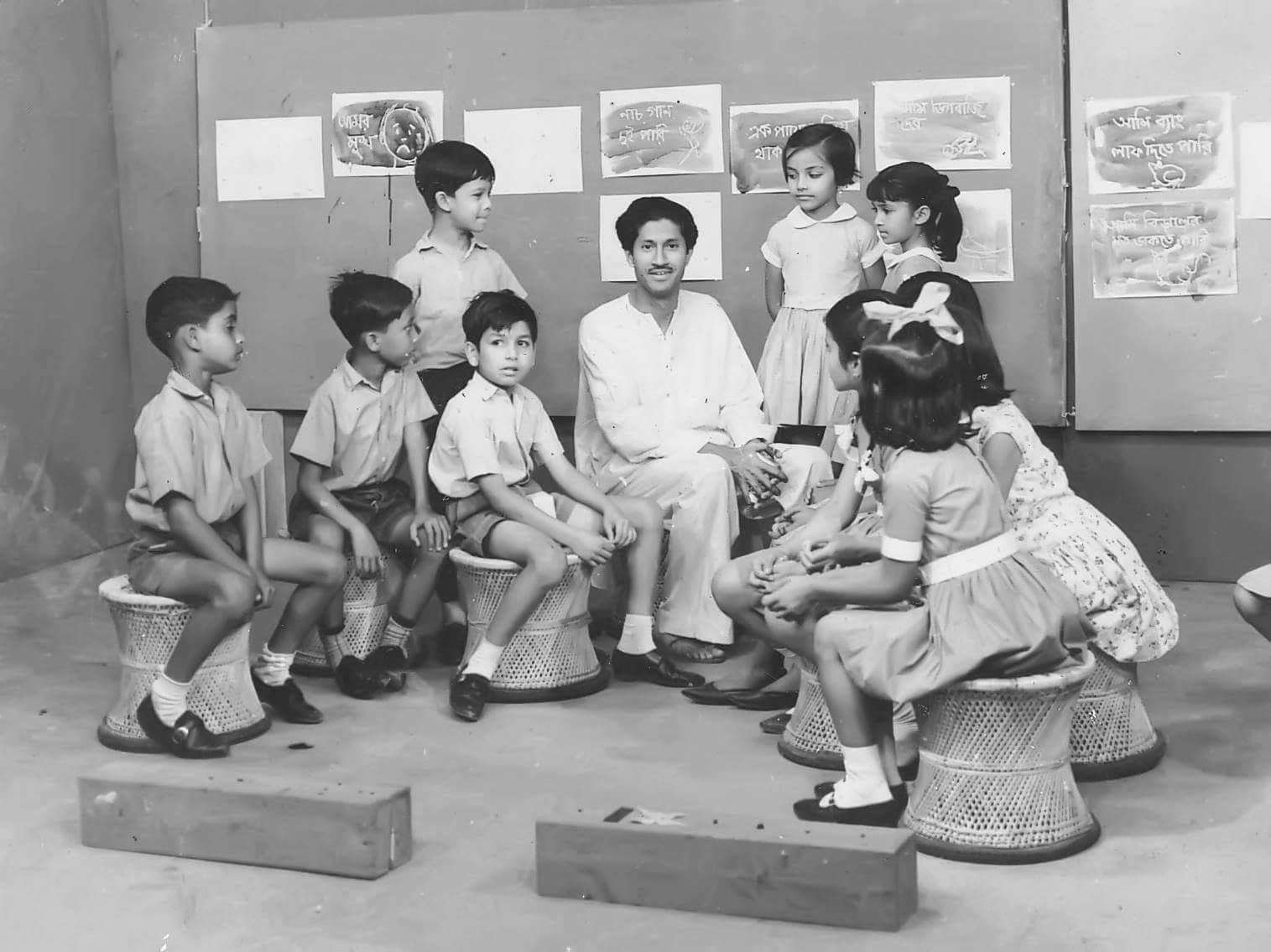
Mustafa Monwar at PTV's Dhaka studios; 1964

After the Indo-Pakistani war in 1971, the PTV was nationalised and brought in completely under the government-ownership management by the then President Zulfikar Ali Bhutto's government. Communication network expansion was vast; by the PTV and government publicly funded its infrastructure expansion all over the country. Until then, PTV refused to cater to political topics but started giving equal airtime for each party.

Promotion of regional literature, science-fiction miniseries, country music, and romanticising rural values in drama playwrights was on-aired by the PTV, at the behest of public funding by the Government of Pakistan. The PTV was considered as a source of major national integration.

Microwave National Network was established among the centers of PTV in 1973, while Quetta and Peshawar centers were started in 1974.

The PTV transmission switched over from its original black and white to colour transmission in 1976. Regional headquarters of PTV and television centers were established in Peshawar and Quetta in 1974. In 1977–78, the PTV broadcast the live Cricket match between England vs. Pakistan. During this time, the PTV's interview programming series brought many scientists, politicians, sportsmen, actors, musicians, and artists to public fame.

==== Development ====
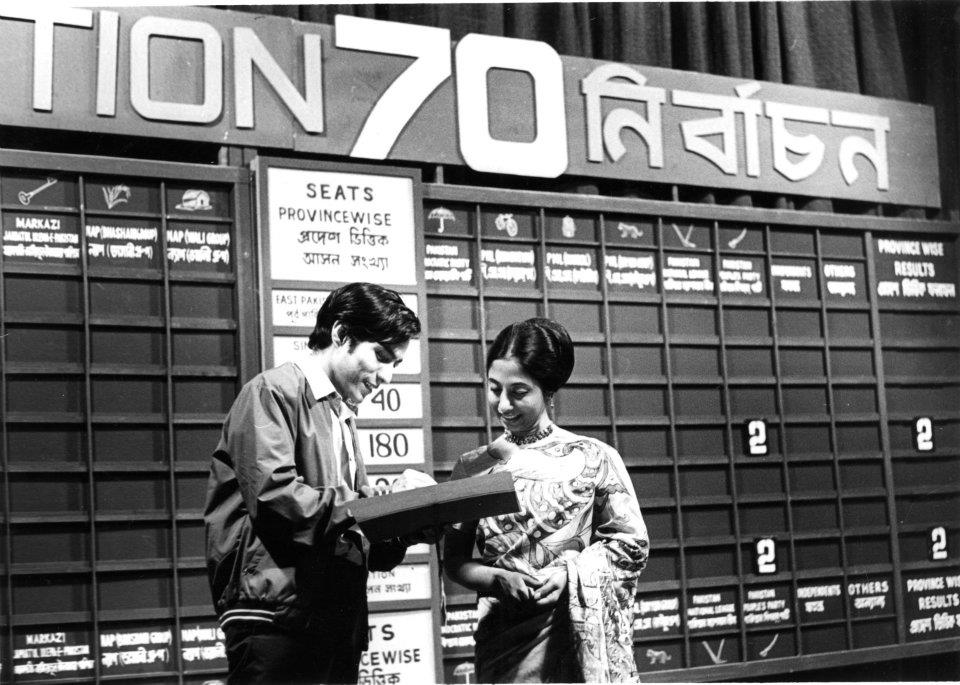
Pakistan Television's National Broadcast of the 1970 General Election

By the 1980s, the transmissions of PTV could be reached over 90% of the area of Pakistan. In the 1980s, the PTV was the sole provider of television and dominated the electronic media industry. During 1980s, the conservative ideas were promoted on the PTV as part of the government policy, and heavy investments were made on the promotion of education programming series.

In the 1990s, the PTV's programming was said initially to have intellectual appeal but succumbed to commercial pressure. In 1992, the composition of PTV's programming was based upon on 56% of entertainment and only 25% of news and educational programmes. About 54% of national programming was based on Urdu, and only 16% accounted for English.

=== State capital revenue ===
Unlike other state-run corporations, Pakistan Television Corporation was allowed by the Government of Pakistan to raise a sizable amount of private capital to finance the stations. This includes a Rs. 35 per month TV fee charge to all consumers of electricity.

=== Controversies ===
The PTV, being the state broadcaster, has exclusive access to telecast the parliamentary sessions through its PTV Parliament channel. The PTV Parliament has sustained criticism of censoring the critique and speeches critical to the ruling party by the opposition leaders on several occasions. During March 2024, the PTV Parliament censored the speeches and critiques of politicians Akhtar Mengal, Asad Qaiser, Mahmood Khan Achakzai, and Omar Ayub Khan when they spoke of the Pakistani military's interference in the political process.

== Channels ==
PTV operates the following channels:

- PTV Home – 24-hour HD Entertainment channel (the original PTV is also called PTV ONE); the transmission is broadcast across Pakistan on a terrestrial network and worldwide through satellite. The content of the terrestrial and satellite channels is different; for example, terrestrial programming includes live telecasts of Pakistan's cricket matches, but satellite channel cannot broadcast these matches.
- PTV News – 24-hour Urdu HD News Channel, which can be viewed in many parts of the globe. Replaced PTV World in 2007.
- PTV Sports– 24-hour HD Sports channel that started its regular transmission in January 2012; it was planned in 2003 in Mir Zafarullah Khan Jamali's tenure but not launched due to political reasons. Now it's a cricket channel which is scrambled and not free for viewers on satellite. Another channel for sports has been in pipeline since February 2016.
- Pakistan TV – 24-hour English News and Current affairs channel. Started as PTV-2 in 1992 as the first satellite channel of Pakistan, it was given a new name of PTV World in 1998 and later went off air in 2007; it was relaunch in January 2013. It was renamed as Pakistan TV in September 2025.
- PTV Global – Offered exclusively for the Pakistani diaspora in the United States on Dish Network and Europe.
- PTV National – An emphasis on broadcasting programmes in different languages to represent the whole of Pakistan.
- AJK TV [PTV Azad Jammu & Kashmir] – For the residents of Azad Jammu and Kashmir.
- PTV Bolan – For speakers of Balochi Pashto and Brahvi.
- PTV Parliament – Launched on 30 May 2018, it brings live proceedings of the Pakistani Parliament and its committees.
- PTV Teleschool - Launched on 14 April 2020, to compensate for academic loss in light of the COVID-19 pandemic.
- Pakistan TV Digital- A state-owned, independent English-language global news channel launched on 17 September 2025, by Prime Minister Shehbaz Sharif to combat propaganda and provide authentic, Pakistani-focused news to an international audience. Operated by the Pakistan Television Corporation, it functions independently to deliver digital news and content.

=== PTV Films Division ===
On 9 June 2022, Minister of Information and Broadcasting Marriyum Aurangzeb and PTV launched the PTV Films Division, along with another initiative was being launched by the name of PTV Flix, which would feature the 75 years of rich content in the form of dramas, films, and other genres in the archives of PTV. The purpose of these is to bring films to the PTV screen but also to generate quality content in the country.

=== Training academy ===
Established in 1987, Pakistan Television Academy is an apex TV institution in Pakistan, which imparts professional training in disciplines of television broadcast technology. It is headed by a full-time director and assisted by a team of television professionals who are members of the academic faculty.

== List of people associated with PTV ==
- Kanwal Naseer – First female and first female face of Pakistan Television.
- Sabri Brothers – Renowned Qawwali Singers and PTV Performers.
- Laeeq Ahmed – First TV Compere, First Commentator, and Anchor Person. He was the only person who was awarded PTV awards in three different categories.
- Aziz Mian – Renowned Qawwali Singer and PTV Performer.
- Nusrat Fateh Ali Khan – Renowned Qawwali And Ghazal Singer & A PTV Performer
- Zulfiqar Ali Bukhari – father of broadcasting in Pakistan; appointed first General Manager of PTV - Karachi Center in 1967, but soon resigned due to political differences with Ayub Khan regime
- Agha Nasir – PTV Producer/Director of Programming at Lahore Centre
- Ashfaq Ahmed – author of PTV drama serials
- Zia Mohyeddin – anchorperson on PTV Shows in the 1970s
- Tariq Aziz - Host of the longest running quiz show
- Muneeza Hashmi – producer of PTV Programs in the 1970s; daughter of renowned poet Faiz Ahmed Faiz
- Fazila Qazi
- Firdous Jamal – TV actor
- Qavi Khan – TV actor
- Kashif Mehmood – TV actor
- Irfan Khoosat – TV actor
- Ayesha Sana – TV actress
- Nauman Ejaz – TV actor
- Anwar Maqsood - Host
- Bushra Ansari - Actress
- Sohail Rana - Musician. Kalion ki Mala program
- Moin Akhter – TV comedian
- Sohail Ahmed – TV comedian
- Tariq Aziz – TV host
- Shoaib Mansoor – TV producer-director
- Ayub Khawar – TV director
- Mahmood Ali - Actor
- Behroze Sabzwari -Actor
- Roohi Bano - Actress
- Khalida Riyasat -Actress
- Amjad Islam Amjad – author of PTV dramas
- Ghayyur Akhtar – TV actor
- Haseena Moin - author of PTV dramas
- Munnu Bhai – author of PTV dramas
- Rashid Mehmood – TV actor
- Obaidullah Baig – TV host
- Siddiq Ismail – Naat Khawan
- Dildar Pervaiz Bhatti – TV host
- Mumtaz Hamid Rao – director of news
- Fatima Surayya Bajia – TV drama writer
- Javed Jabbar – TV film director
- Mehreen Jabbar – TV film director
- Mohammed Ehteshamuddin
- Tufail Niazi – renowned folk singer and PTV performer
- Anwar Sajjad – author of PTV dramas
- Kazim Pasha
- Rauf Khalid
- Zafar Mairaj
- Syed Bilal Naqvi Producer and Director
- Tauseeq Haider
- Mustansar Hussain Tarar – PTV anchorperson
- Alam Lohar – renowned folk singer and PTV performer
- Mahpara Safdar - newscaster
- Suraiya Shahab, newscaster
- Azhar Lodhi, newscaster
- Khalid Hameed, newscaster
- Abdus Salam, newscaster

== See also ==
- List of television stations in Pakistan
- List of television programmes broadcast by the PTV
