= Ubaidur Rahman =

Pakistani electrical engineer and broadcaster

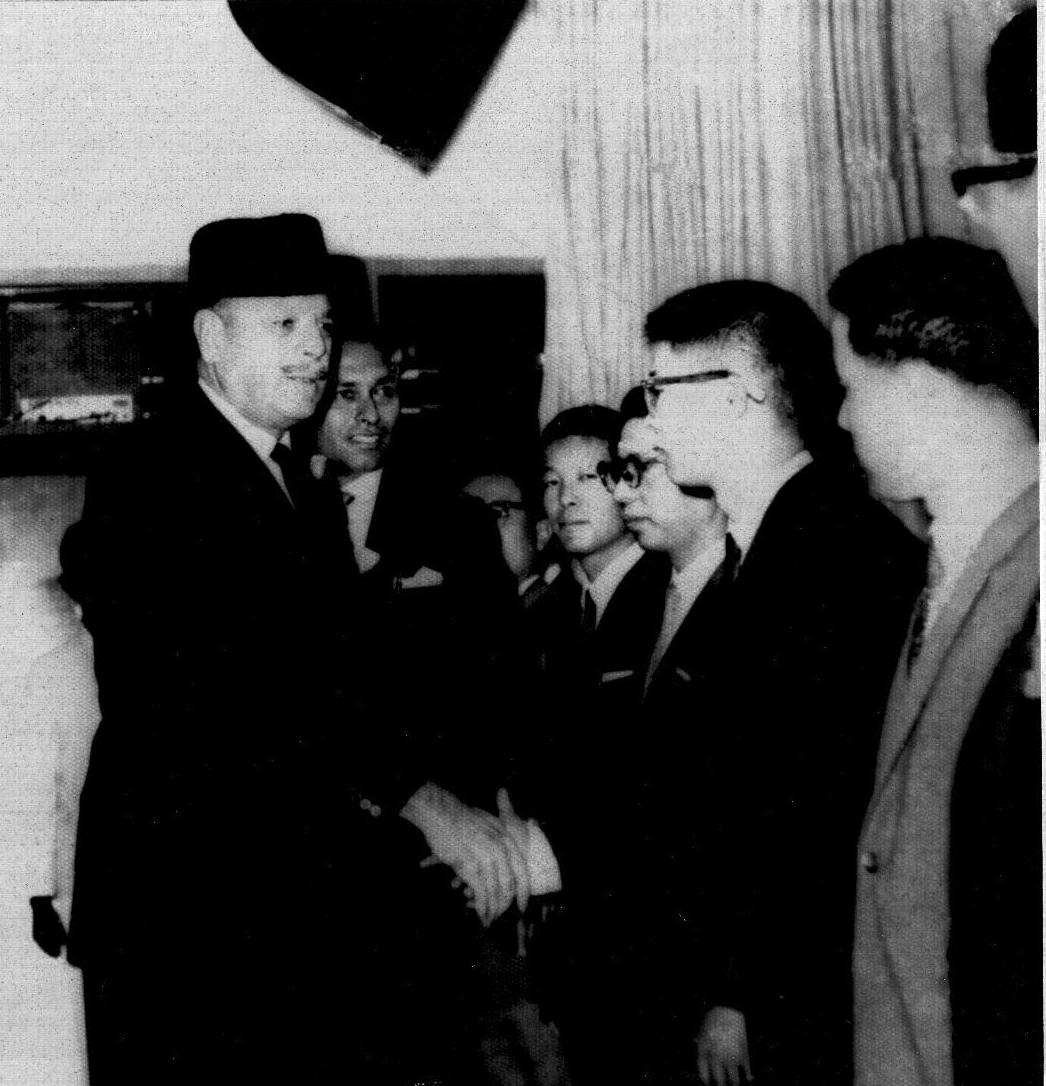
- Rahman (in background) and President Ayub Khan meeting NEC officials at PTV's inauguration, 1964.
- Born: Delhi, British India
- Resting place: Montreal, Canada.
- Citizenship: Pakistan
- Education: University of Liverpool
- Known for: Establishing and launching PTV, Lahore, Islamabad, Karachi and Dhaka.
- Spouse: Yasmin Rahman 1934-2024
- Children: Dr. Irfan Jamil Rahman 1955-2020 Dr. Rizwan Jamil Rahman Tamgha-e-Imtiaz
- Awards: Tamgha-e-Imtiaz; Pride of Performance
- Scientific career
- Fields: Electrical Engineering and General Manager of PTV, Lahore
- Institutions: Civil Aviation 1951-1961 Pakistan Television Corporation 1962-1967 Canadian Broadcasting Corporation CBC 1967-1989

Ubaidur Rahman (Urdu: عبيدالرحمان) was an electrical engineer and broadcaster professional credited as one of the founders of Pakistan Television (PTV), the state-owned public and commercial broadcasting television network. He also helped expand the commercial activities of Pakistan Broadcasting Corporation.

== Brief PTV history ==
In 1961, Pakistani industrialist Syed Wajid Ali (owner of Packages Limited) initiated a television project in Pakistan, signing a joint venture agreement with NEC of Japan. Ubaidur Rahman was appointed by Syed Wajid Ali to head and develop this television project. After pilot transmission tests, the project's control was given to President Ayub Khan's government in 1962. The project team began work in a small studio within a tent in the Radio Pakistan compound in Lahore, Pakistan, where a transmission tower was constructed. On 26 November 1964, the first TV transmission from Lahore took place.

In 2012, former Managing Director of PTV Agha Nasir wrote a book on the history of PTV titled: PTV: Another Day, Another World. It details his experiences while working at the PTV for over 50 years.
