= Aslam Azhar =

Pakistani television executive (1932-2015)

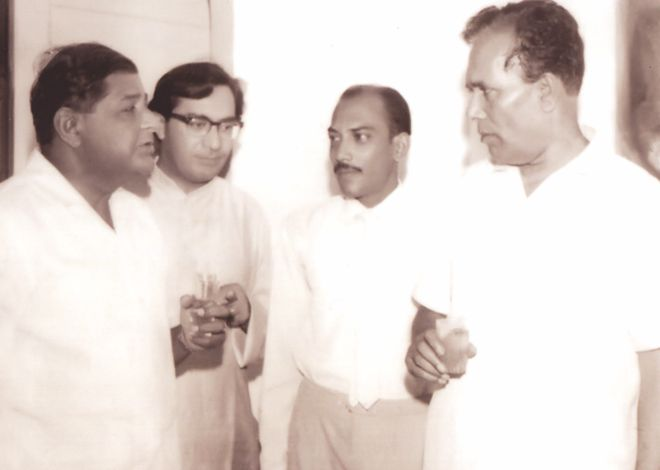
- Azhar (second from left) at the opening ceremony of Mubinul Azim's exhibition in Karachi in 1968
- Born: 2 September 1932; Lahore, Punjab, British India
- Died: 29 December 2015 (aged 83); Islamabad, Pakistan
- Occupation: Business manager
- Known for: Pioneer of Pakistani television
- Title: Chairman and Managing Director; Pakistan Television Corporation
- Awards: Tamgha-i-Pakistan (Medal of Pakistan) award (1968); Nigar Award (1999); Sitara-i-Imtiaz (Star of Excellence) award by the President of Pakistan (2012)

Aslam Azhar (Urdu: اسلم اظہر; 2 September 1932 – 29 December 2015) was a Pakistan Television executive, considered to be the "founding father of Pakistan Television".

He was the first Chairman and Managing Director of PTV first appointed during the Ayub Khan government in November 1964 when the PTV Lahore Center first started broadcasting and went on the air. He was awarded the Tamgha-i-Pakistan (Medal of Pakistan) for his pioneering services in the television broadcasting field by the President of Pakistan. Subsequently, in 1988, he became the first Chairman of the PTV who was not a bureaucrat as all earlier chairmen got that office by virtue of their being federal information secretaries.

== Early life and career ==
Aslam Azhar was born in Lahore as a son of a government servant during the British Raj. He studied law at Cambridge University and later worked for the Burmah Oil Company. He was also interested in theater, and met his wife Nasreen Jan through a theater group.

Meanwhile, Pakistani government wanted to set up a television service in the country. The Japanese were given the contract to set up a pilot television station in Lahore. Aslam Azhar was asked to come to Lahore from Karachi and start the television station in Lahore. He convinced the renowned writers Ashfaq Ahmed and Anwar Sajjad to write for television. Faiz Ahmad Faiz, his favorite poet, became his friend, too.

== Death and legacy ==
He died on 29 December 2015 at the age of 83. His funeral was performed on 30 December 2015 at Islamabad, Pakistan. He has two sons, Usama Azhar and Arieb Azhar, who is a musician, and a daughter, Umaima Azhar. Also among the survivors was his wife of 51 years, Nasreen Azhar.

In 2016, one of the major English-language Pakistani newspaper commented, "He was one of the founding fathers of Pakistan Television (PTV) – the title not merely an empty slogan. When the medium came to Pakistan in 1964, Azhar spearheaded its evolution, and did not make his exit before making PTV a dynamic broadcasting institution."

Another Pakistani veteran bureaucrat Roedad Khan said, "I called Aslam Azhar, who was general manager at the time, and said I don't know much about television but I want to learn. I learnt a lot from him. Before the 1970 elections, we decided to cover the elections live. Even though the technology wasn't advanced enough, and the engineers had no experience with it, we did it."

"Leaders such as Khan Abdul Qayyum Khan, Abdul Hamid Khan Bhashani, Sheikh Mujibur Rehman, Zulfikar Ali Bhutto and others were given the opportunity to speak live." Roedad Khan said in his tribute to Aslam Azhar at the event.

== Awards and recognition ==
- A Special Award from Nigar Awards- 'Millennium Award' in 1999.
- A Tamgha-i-Pakistan Award in 1968 by the President of Pakistan.
- Sitara-i-Imtiaz Award (Star of Excellence) Award on 23 March 2012 by President Asif Ali Zardari.

== See also ==
- Television in Pakistan
