= Enver Sajjad =

Pakistani playwright and fiction writer (1935–2019)

- Born: Anwar Sajjad; 27 November 1935; Lahore, Punjab, British India
- Died: 6 June 2019 (aged 84); Lahore, Punjab, Pakistan

Anwar Sajjad, more commonly known as Enver Sajjad (27 November 1935 – 6 June 2019) was a Pakistani playwright and fiction writer. Because he was a novelist, playwright, actor, director, producer, voice-over artist, columnist, painter, dancer and physician, he has been described as a polymath.

Anwar Sajjad was a Pakistani writer, playwright, actor, director, painter, dancer, voice-over artist and physician. He was associated with Urdu short fiction, Pakistani television and theatre, and was known for experimental and symbolic writing in Urdu literature. He received the President's Pride of Performance in 1989.

== Early life and education ==
Sajjad was born in Lahore on 27 November 1935. He studied medicine and completed his MBBS from King Edward Medical College, Lahore. He later obtained a Diploma in Tropical Medicine and Hygiene from London. After returning to Lahore, he practised medicine for a time at his father's clinic in Chuna Mandi, Lahore.

== Literary career ==
Sajjad began writing in the early 1950s while still a teenager. His first novelette, Rag-i-Sang, was published in 1955. His later works included Chauraha, Janam Roop, Khushiyon Ka Bagh, Neeli Notebook, Talash-i-Wajood, Zard Konpal, Rassi Ki Zanjeer, Nigar Khana Saba and Samandar. He was known as the founding father of modern Urdu fiction and was credited by Dawn with introducing an abstract style into Urdu short-story writing.

His short-story collection Chauraha was first published in 1965 and later appeared in a second edition in 1986. His collection Istearay was published in 1970. His book of essays, Talash-e-Vajood, was also discussed as an important statement of his views on art, culture, history and literature.

Sajjad also translated The Blue Notebook, a novella by Soviet writer Emmanuil Kazakevich, into Urdu as Neeli Notebook. According to Naazir Mahmood in The News International, Sajjad translated the work while imprisoned after the 1977 military coup in Pakistan. Mahmood also wrote that Sajjad's novel Khushiyon Ka Bagh was written in August 1979 and was influenced by the work of the Dutch painter Hieronymus Bosch.

== Television, theatre and performing arts ==
Sajjad was part of the early generation of writers and performers associated with Pakistan Television Corporation (PTV). He wrote several television plays, including Picnic, Raat Ka Pichla Pehar, Koyal and Yeh Zameen Meri Hai. The Express Tribune also stated that he wrote the first commissioned play telecast in the subcontinent in November 1964.

In addition to writing, Sajjad acted in a number of PTV productions. He was nominated for a PTV award for his performance in the drama serial Saba aur Samandar. He was also known as a voice-over artist, teacher, painter and actor. Sajjad remained active in Lahore's literary and artistic circles and chaired the Pakistan Arts Council Lahore before moving to Karachi. In later years, he oversaw the scriptwriting department at the National Academy of Performing Arts, leaving the position because of illness and other grievances.

== Political and cultural associations ==
Sajjad was associated with progressive literary circles in Pakistan. According to Dawn, he was a member of cultural and literary organisations and also had a long affiliation with the Pakistan Peoples Party. Members of the Progressive Writers Movement remembered him after his death as a writer who continued to speak against capitalism and retained his political and artistic commitments.

== Personal life ==
Sajjad was married to actress and lawyer Zaib Rehman. They had two daughters, Ayesha and Priya.

== Death ==
Sajjad died in Lahore on 6 June 2019 after a prolonged illness. He was 84.

== Works ==
=== Fiction and essays ===
- Rag-i-Sang
- Chauraha
- Istearay
- Aaj
- Pehli Kahaniyan
- Janam Roop
- Khushiyon Ka Bagh
- Neeli Notebook
- Talash-i-Wajood / Talash-e-Vajood
- Zard Konpal
- Rassi Ki Zanjeer
- Nigar Khana Saba
- Samandar

=== Television plays ===
- Picnic
- Raat Ka Pichla Pehar
- Koyal
- Yeh Zameen Meri Hai

=== Theatre plays ===
- Aik Thi Malika
- Khatra-e-Jan
- Meri Jan
- Faslay

== Awards and recognition ==
- President's Pride of Performance, 1989
- Lifetime Achievement Award from the Progressive Writers Movement, 2019
