= BBC Urdu =

Urdu-language division of the BBC

BBC Urdu بی بی سی اردو
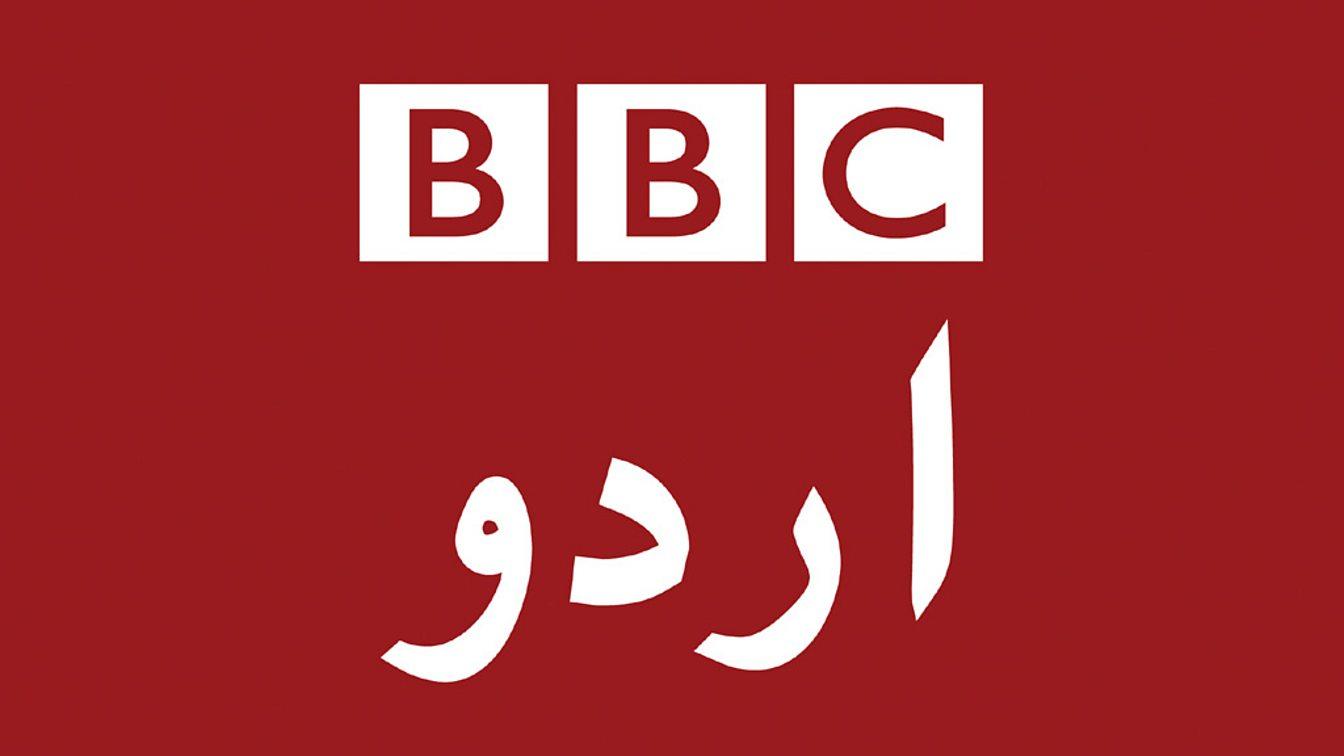
- Type: Radio network and website
- Country: United Kingdom, Afghanistan, Pakistan
- Availability: International
- Endowment: Foreign and Commonwealth Office, UK
- Owner: BBC
- Launch date: May 1940
- Official website: www.bbc.com/urdu/
- Language: Urdu

BBC Urdu (Urdu: بی بی سی اردو) is a digital television station covering the Indian subcontinent in the Urdu language. It was the Urdu language station of the BBC World Service, accompanied by its website, which served as a news portal and provided online access to radio broadcasts. The radio service was broadcast from Broadcasting House in London and Pakistan as well as from a BBC South and East Asia bureau in New Delhi, India. It also has a children's channel CBeebies. The target audience were Pakistani and Indian viewers.

== History ==
BBC Urdu Service, originally launched in May 1940, was initially known as the BBC Hindustani Service. It was launched to mitigate the influence of wartime misinformation from Nazi Germany and Fascist Italy. After the independence of India in 1947, the service was split into two separate entities: the Indian service for Hindi speakers, and the Pakistani service for Urdu speakers.

In 1967, Pakistan Service was renamed as the Urdu Service to better serve Urdu-speaking audiences in India, Europe, Pakistan, and Gulf.

On 30 December 2022, after almost two decades of operation, BBC Pakistan stopped its Urdu Radio as part of its global cost-cutting efforts.

== Programs ==
- Sairbeen

== See also ==
- BBC World Service
- Abbas Nasir
